= List of butterflies of Kerala =

This is a list of butterfly species found in the Kerala, India.

== Family: Papilionidae ==
=== Subfamily: Papilioninae ===
==== Genus: Graphium (swordtails, bluebottles and jays) ====
===== Graphium agamemnon (tailed jay) =====
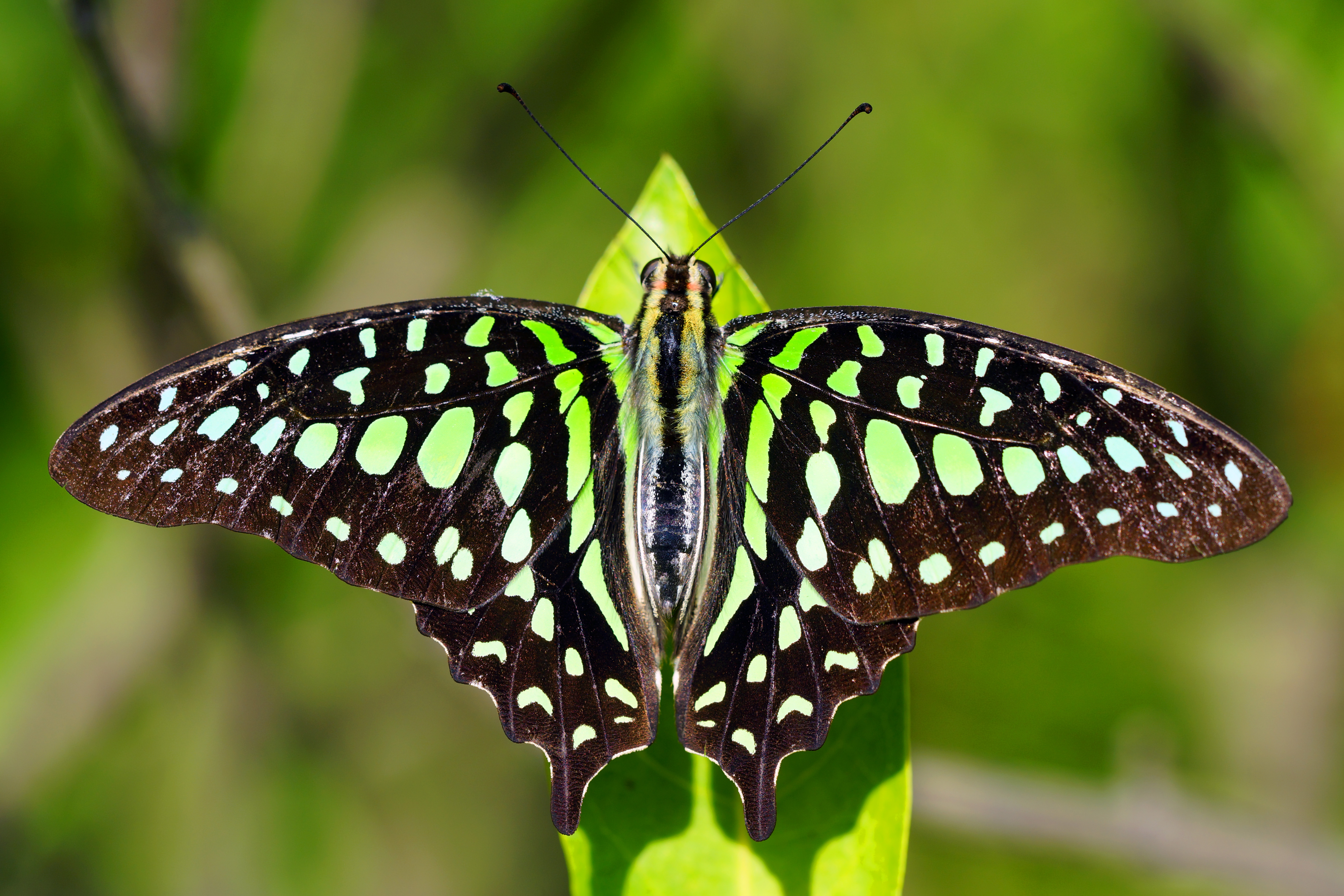
Dorsal view

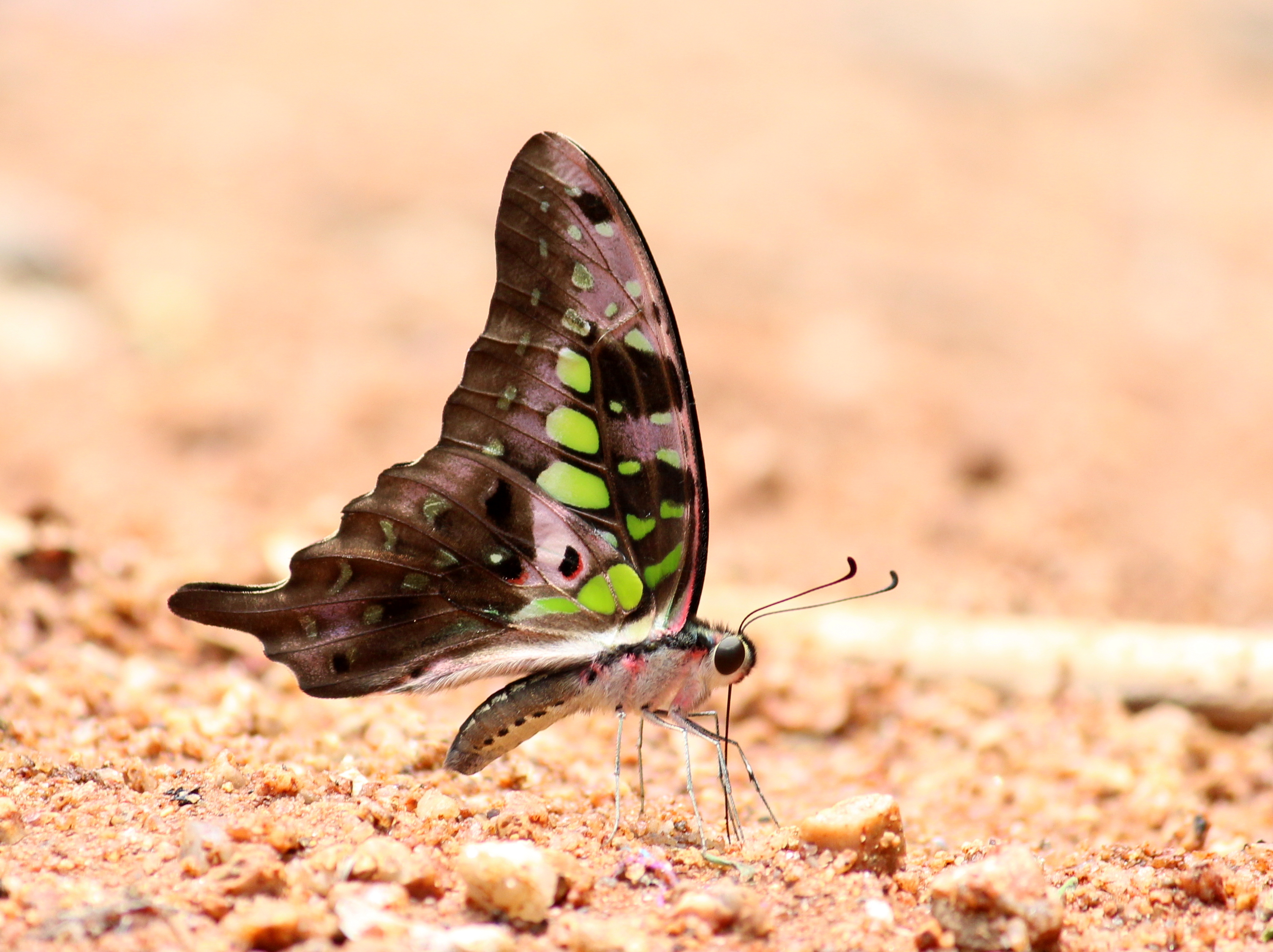
Ventral view

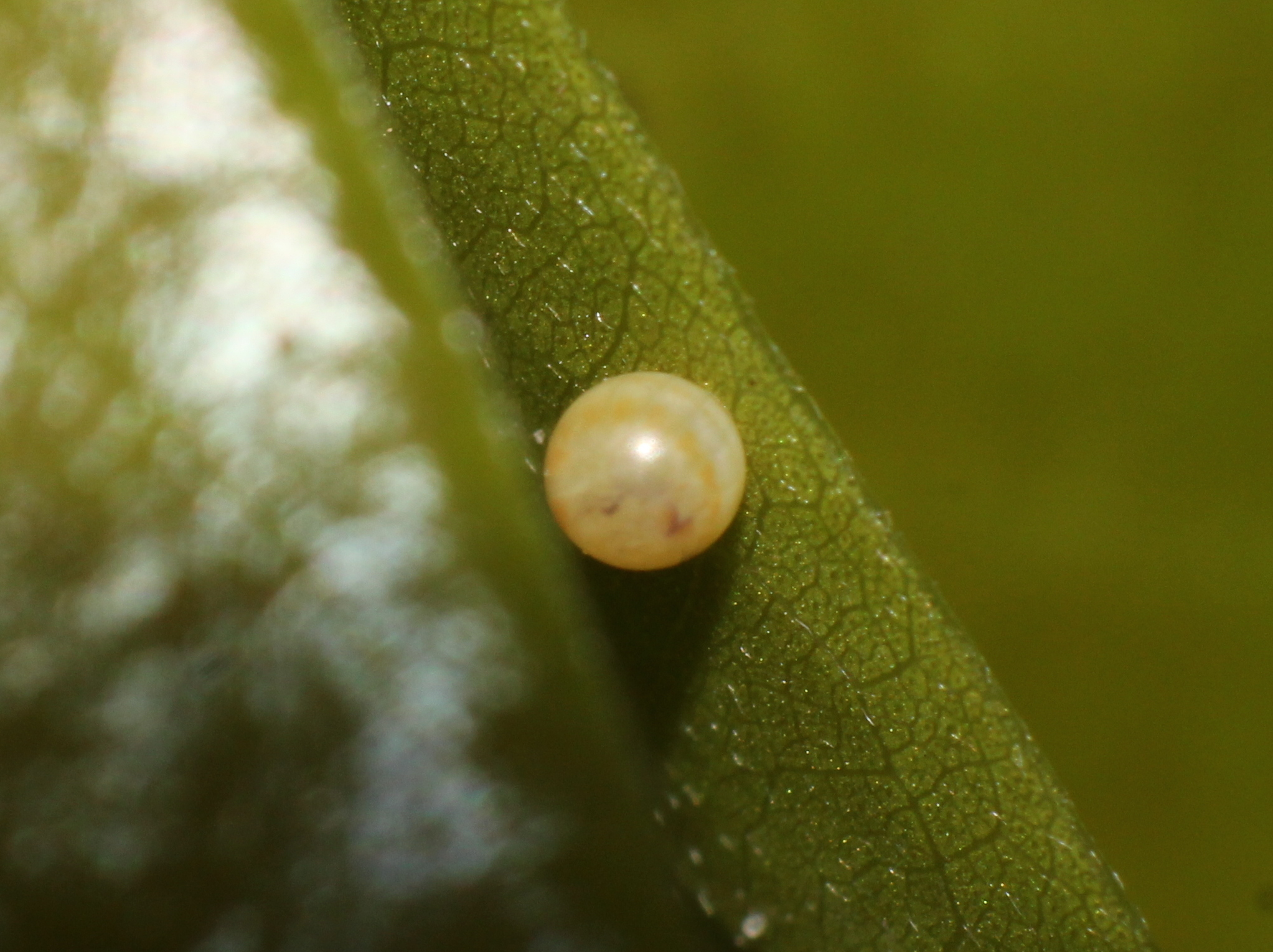
Egg

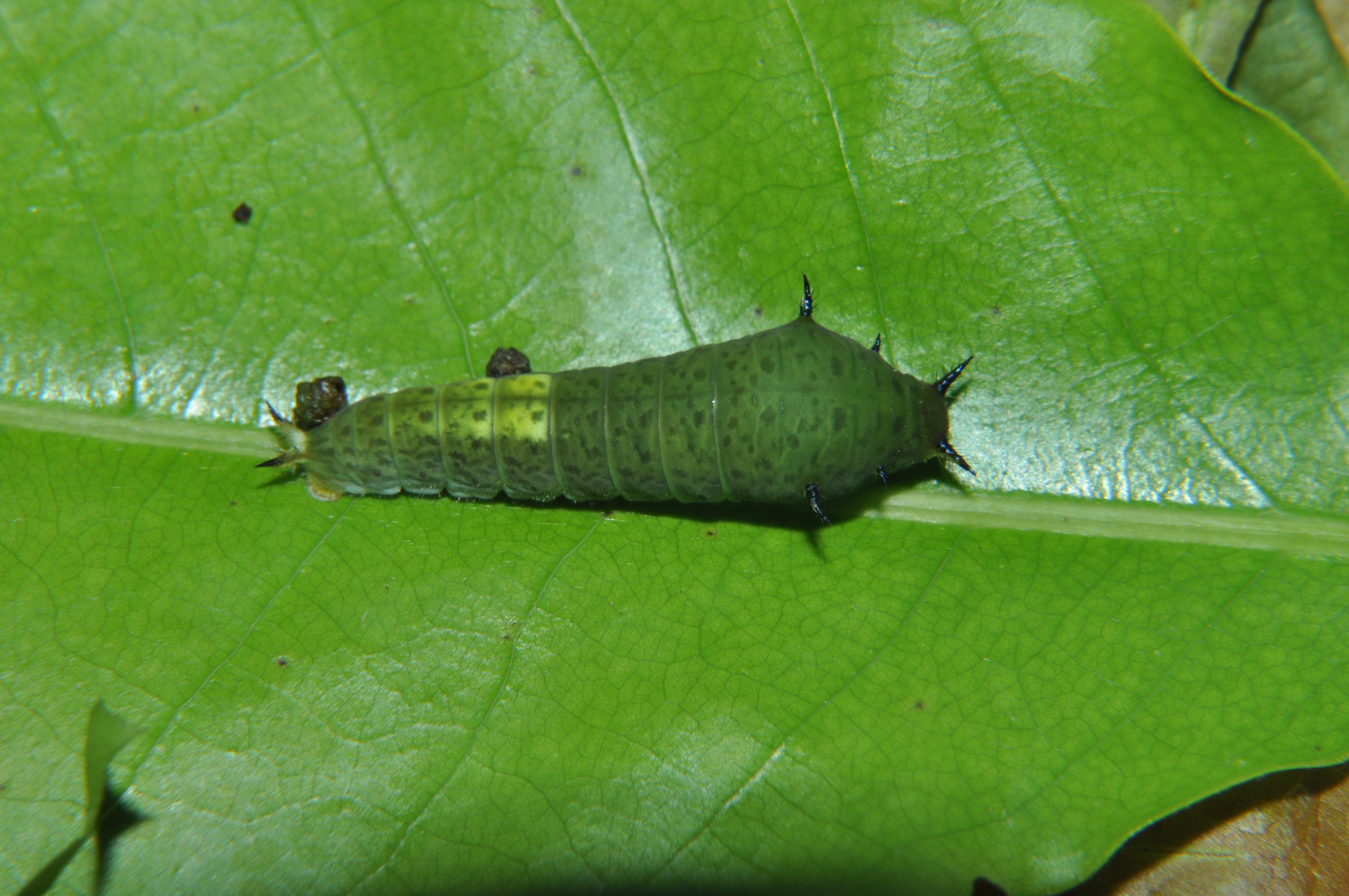
Larva

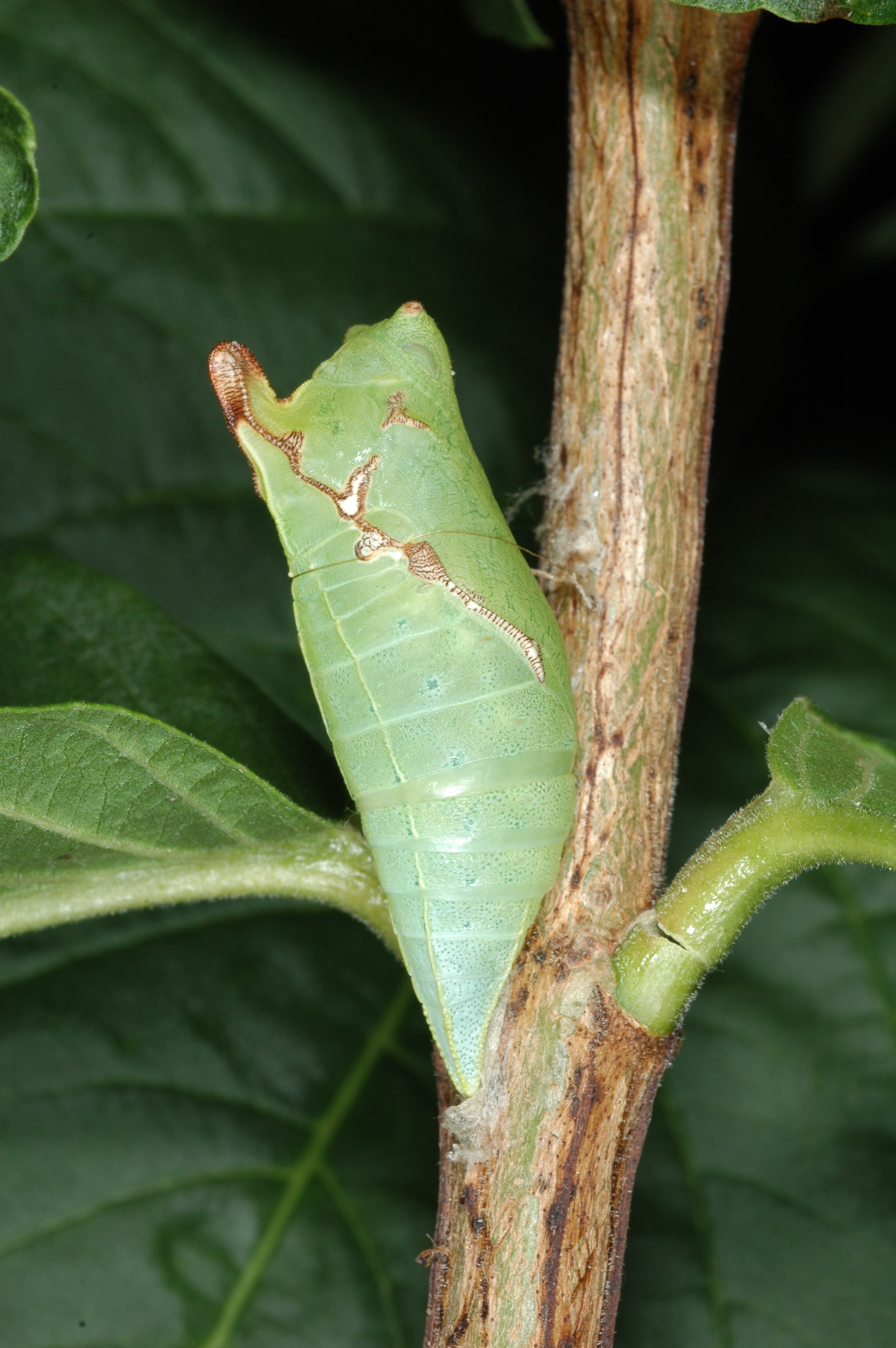
Pupa

===== Graphium antiphates (fivebar swordtail) =====
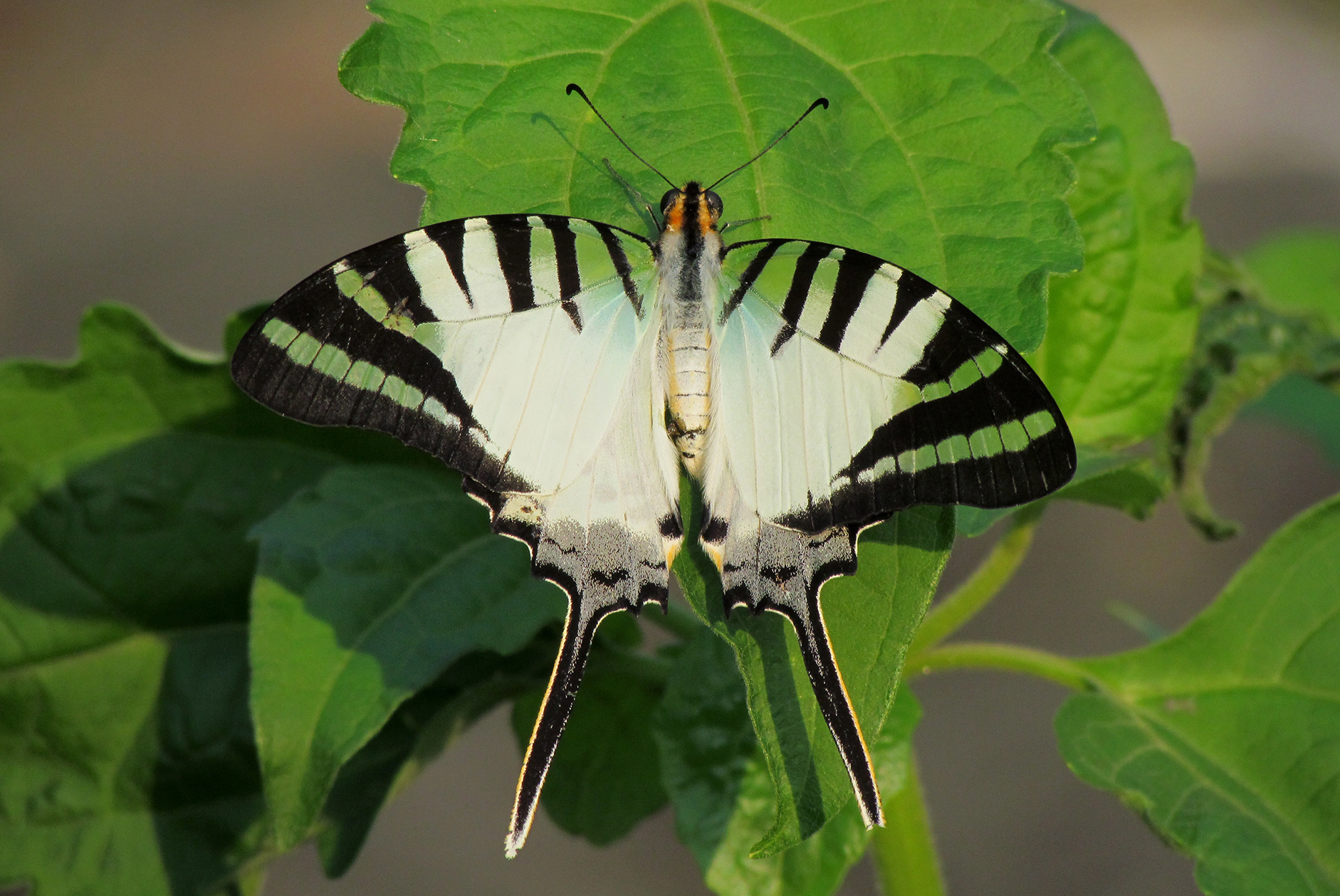
Dorsal view

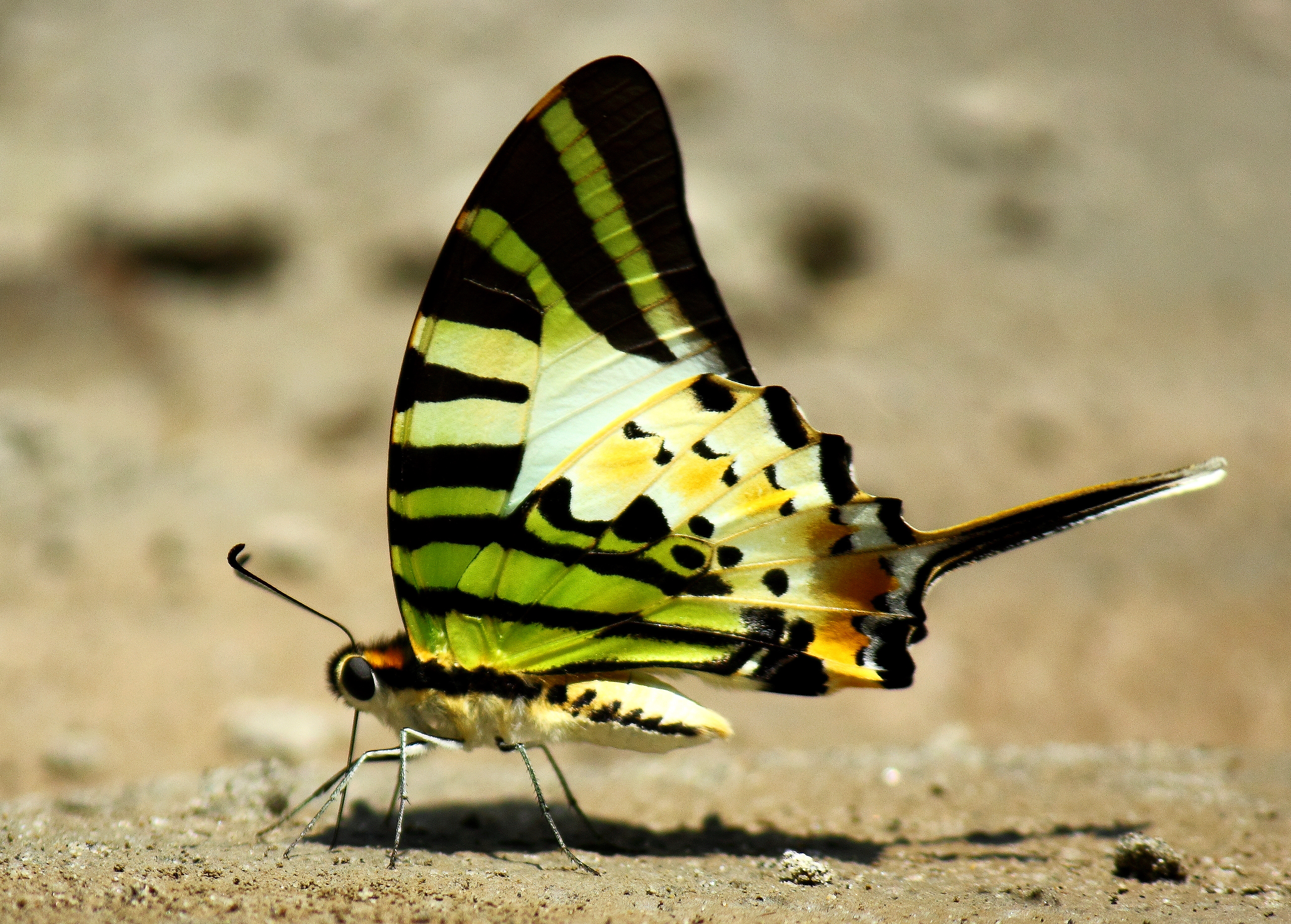
Ventral view

===== Graphium doson (common jay) =====
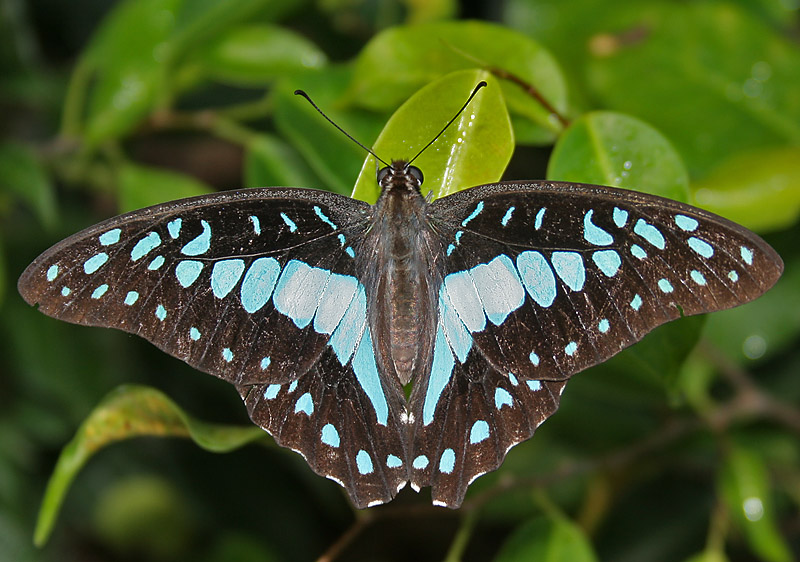
Dorsal view

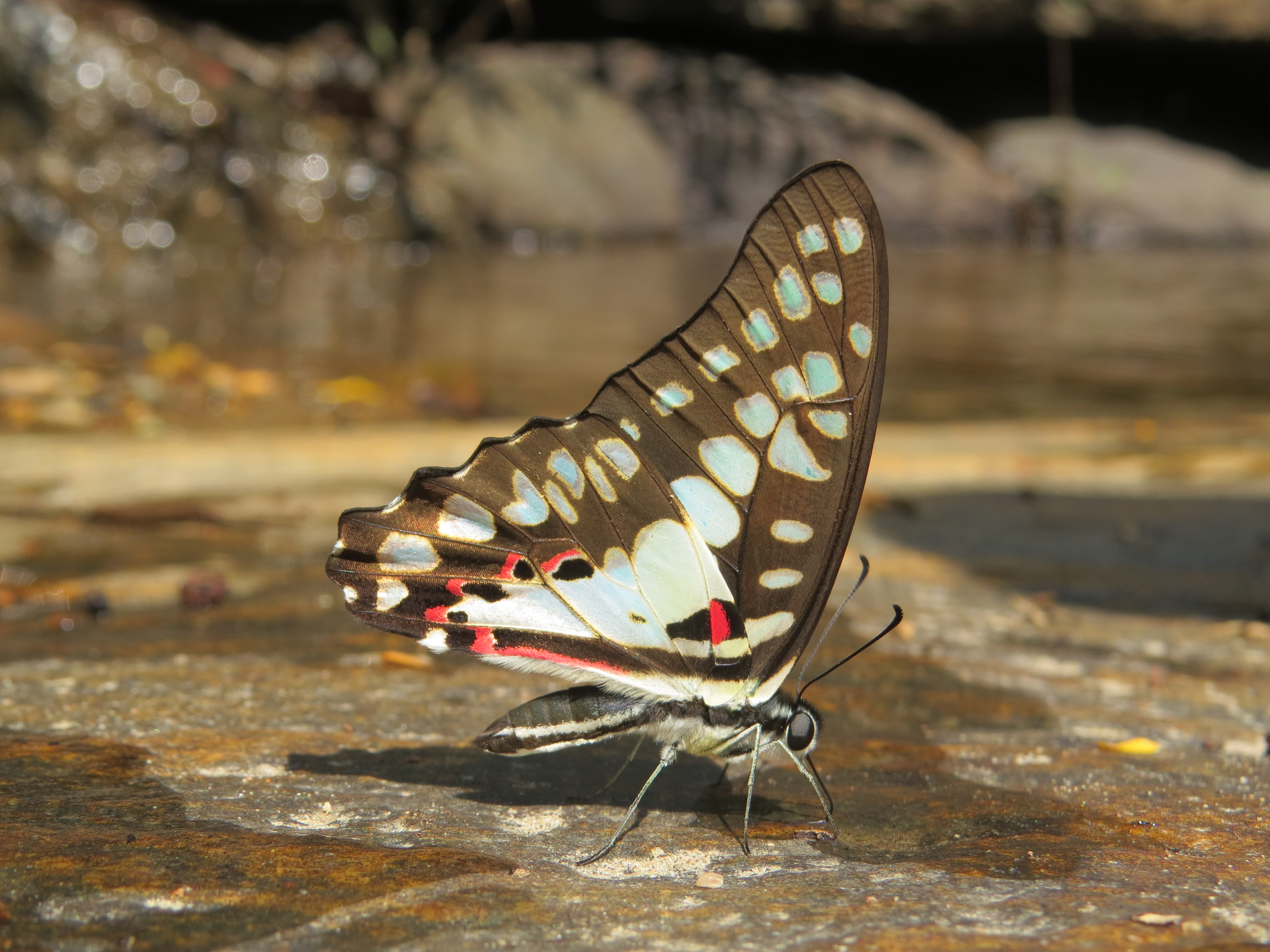
Ventral view

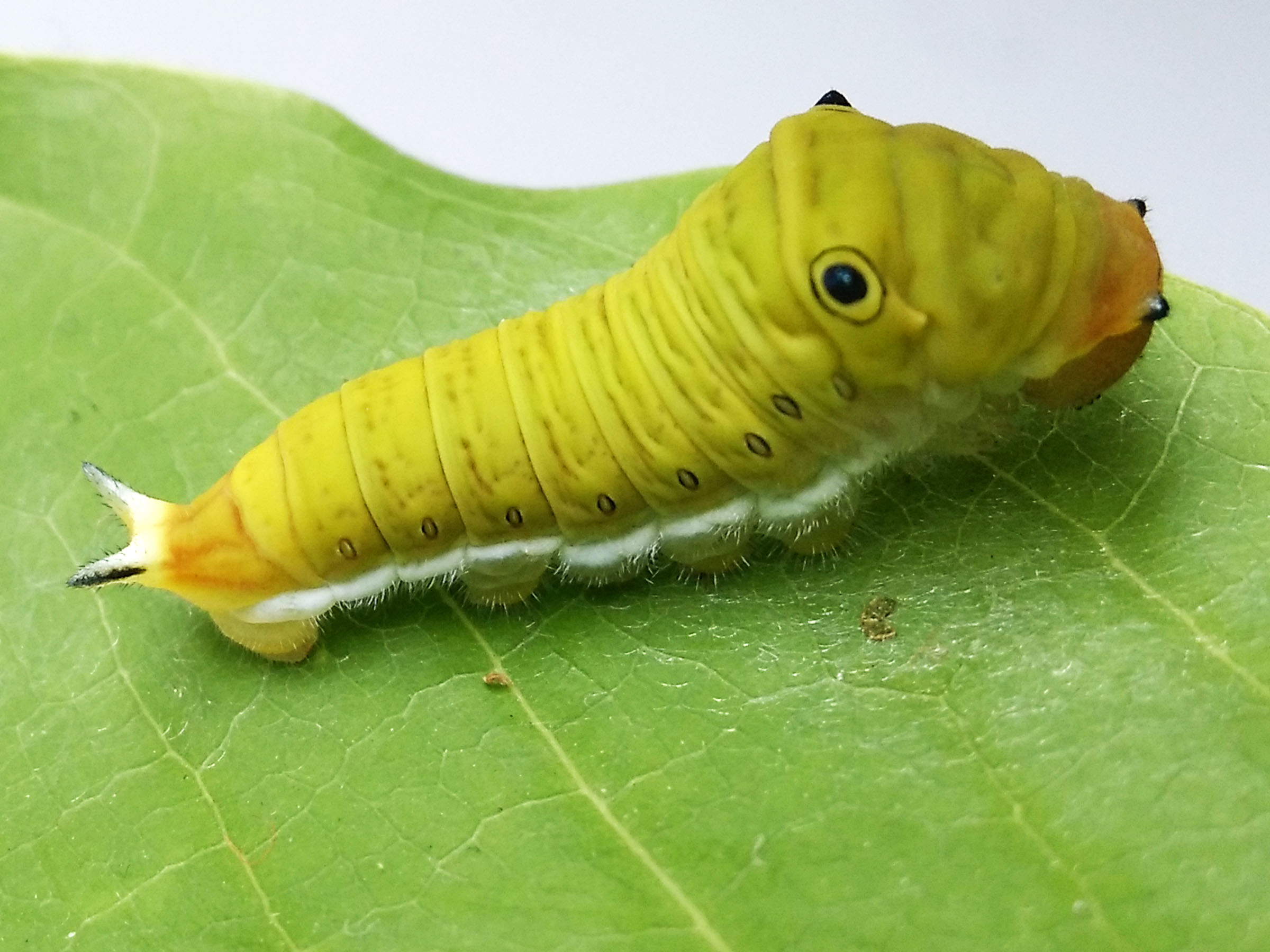
Larva

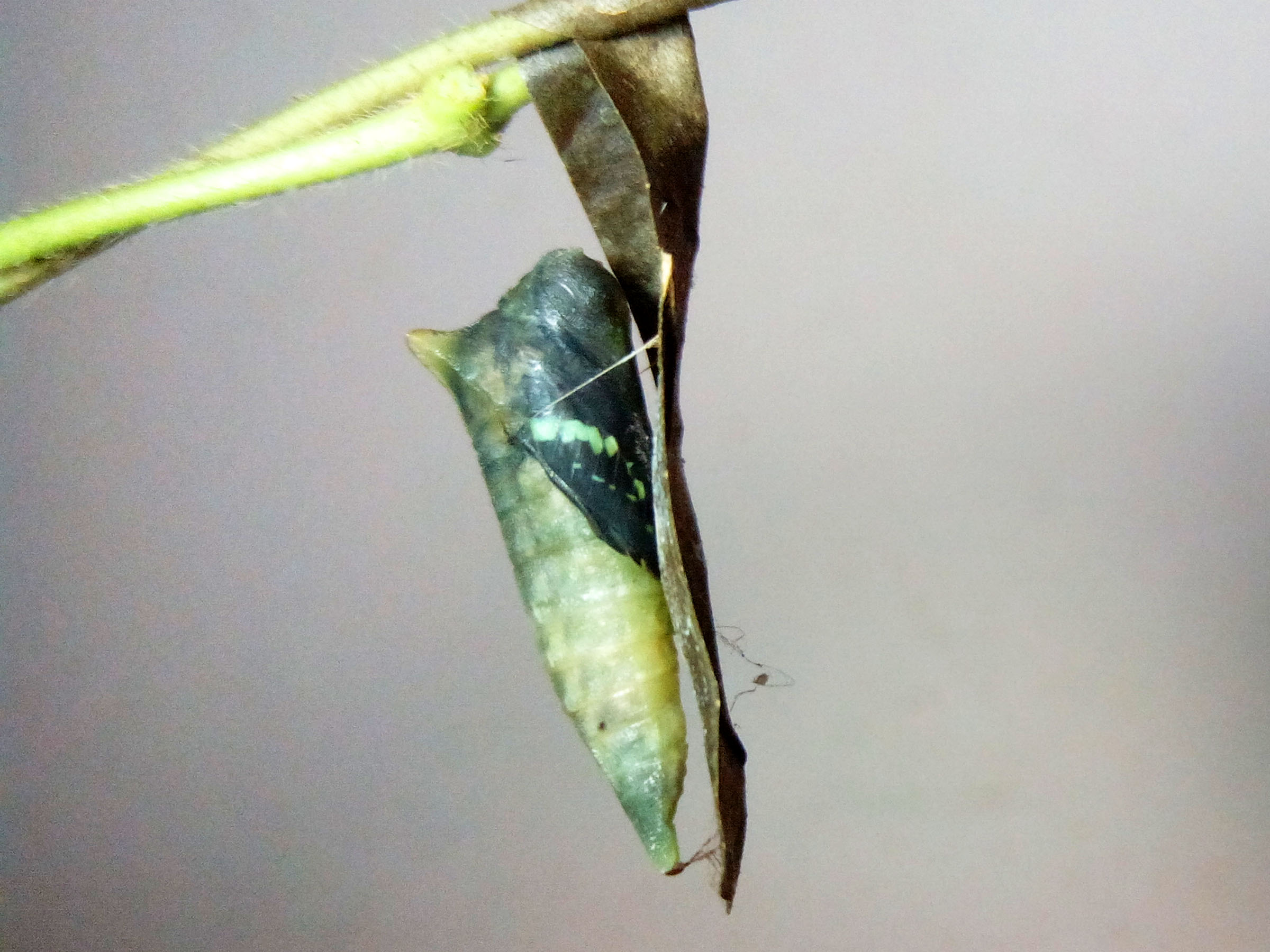
Pupa

===== Graphium nomius (spot swordtail) =====
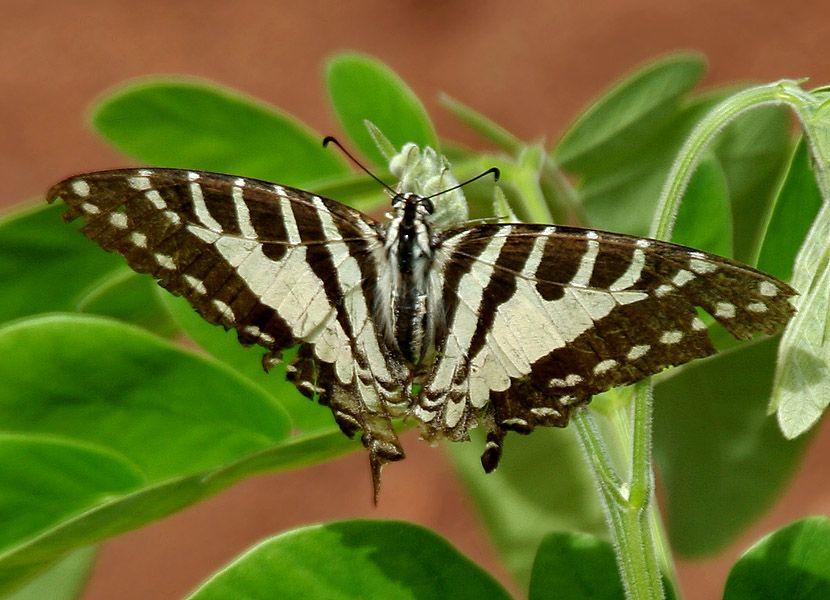
Dorsal view

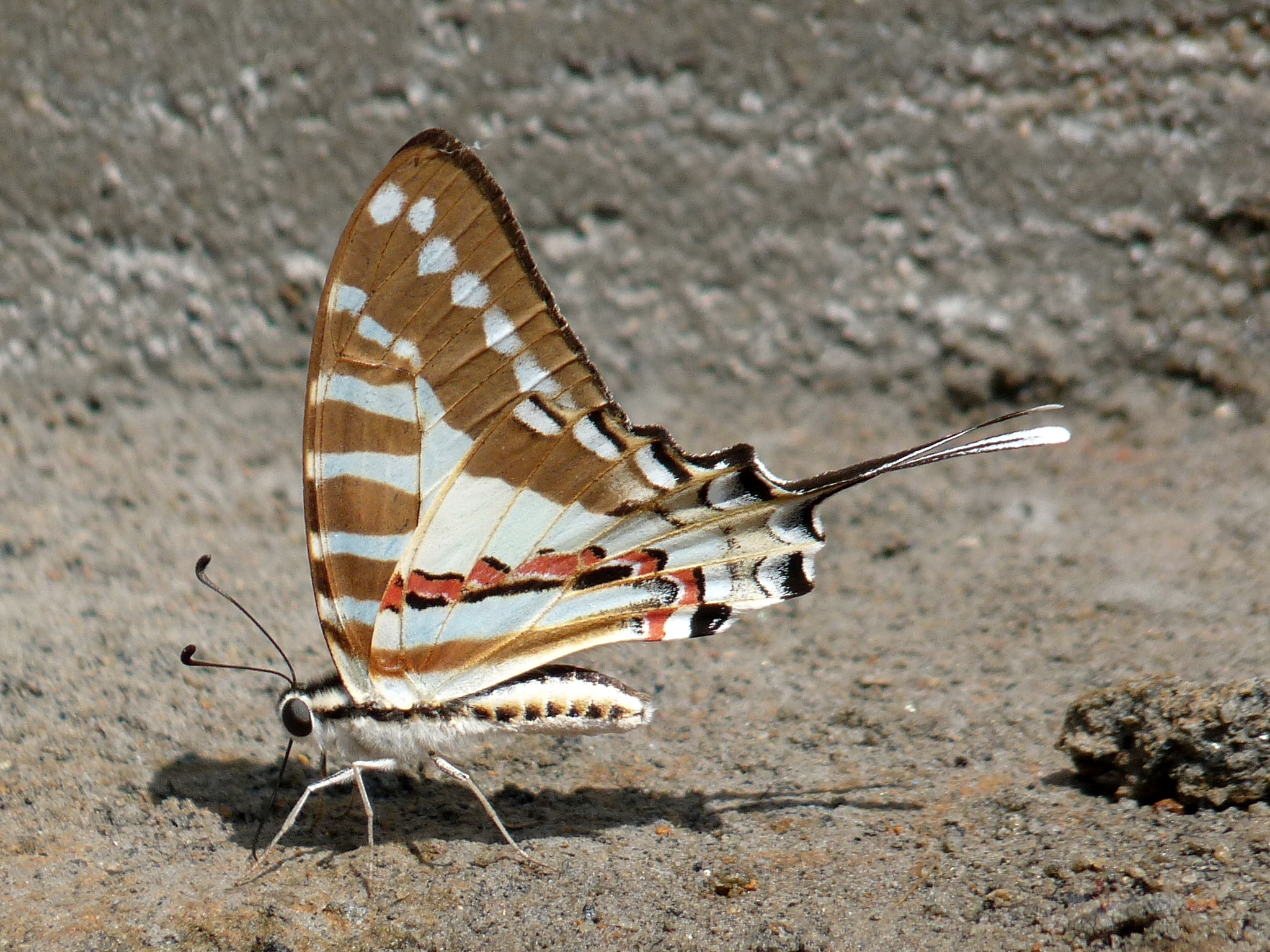
Ventral view

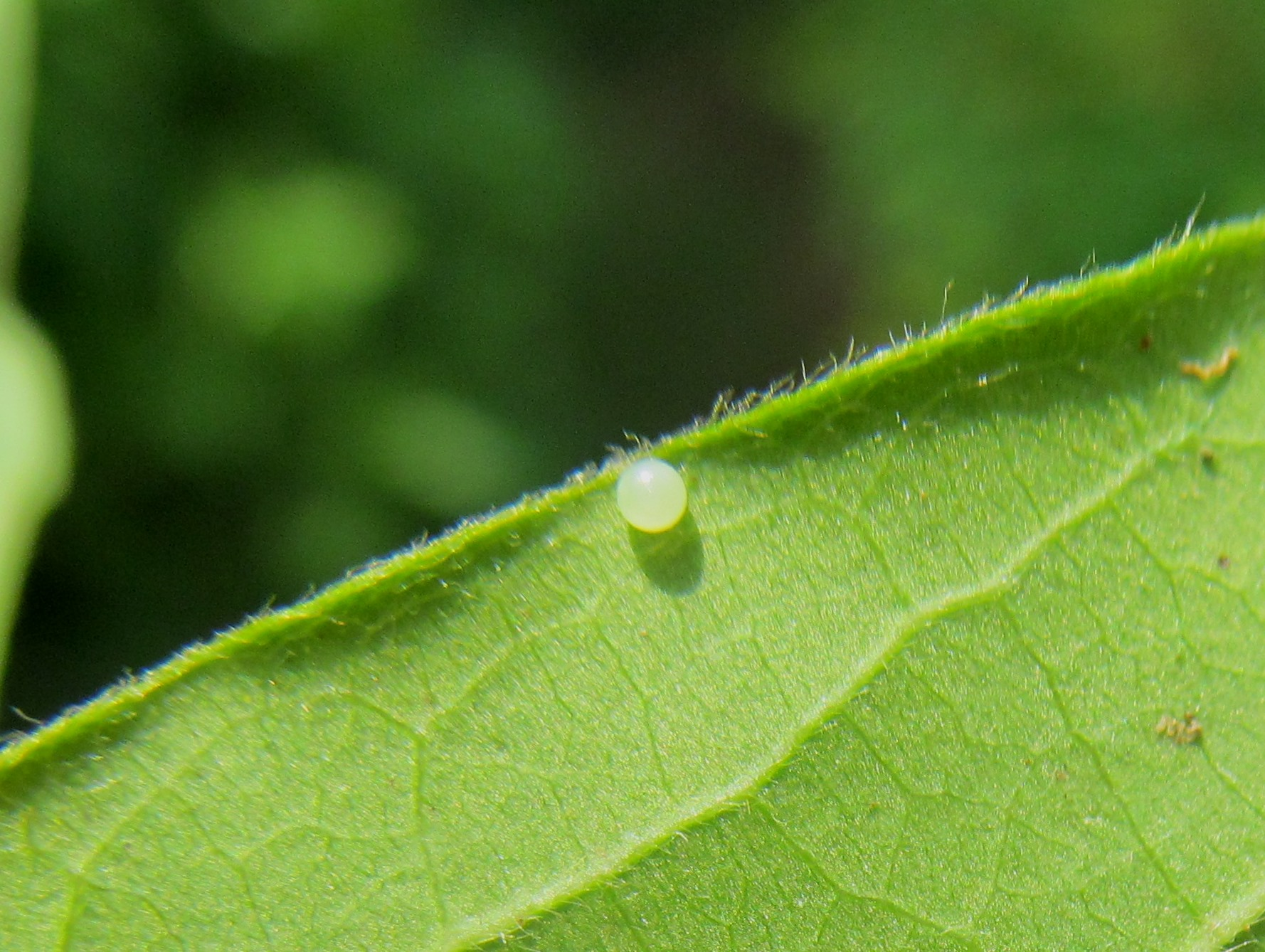
Egg

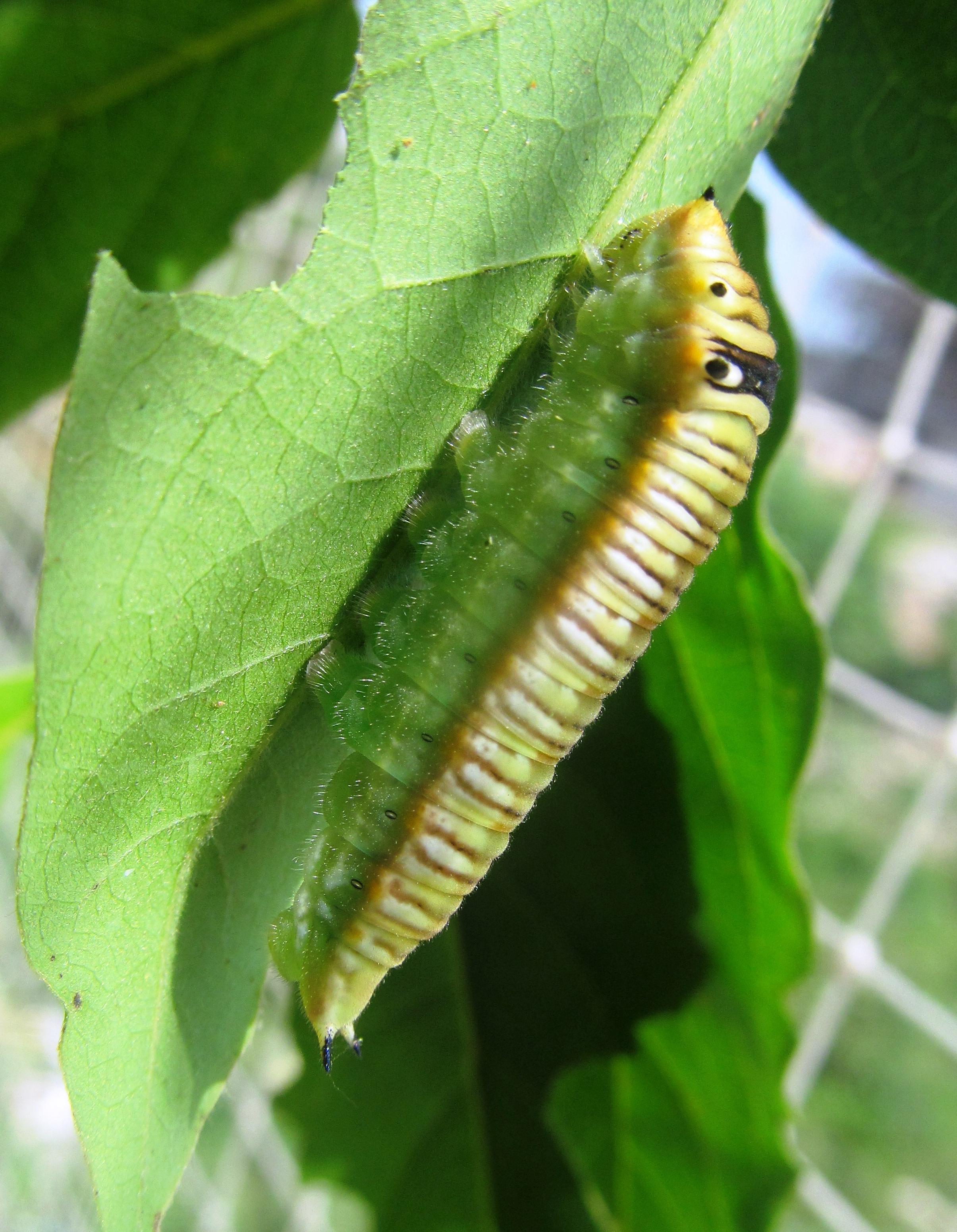
Larva

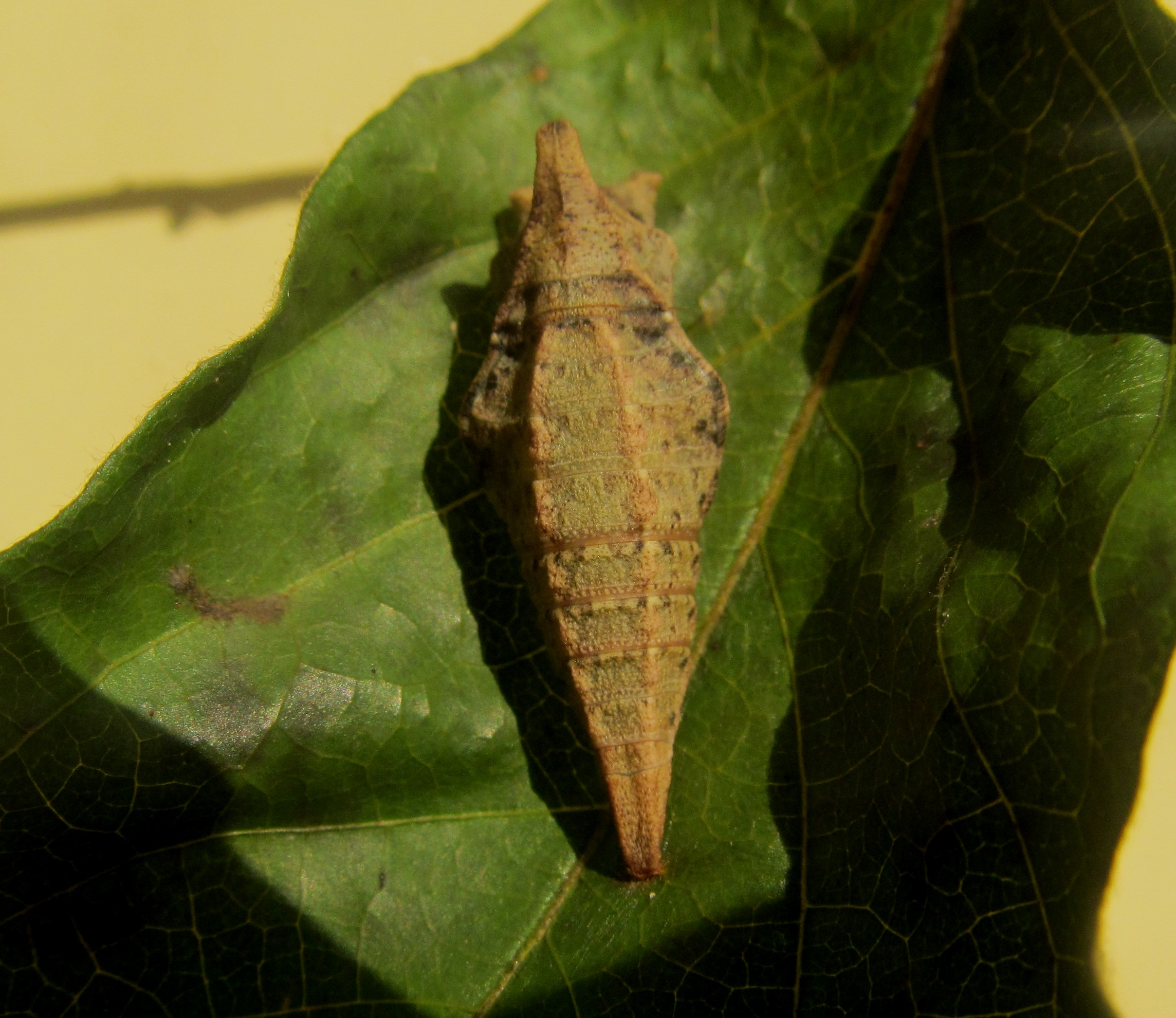
Pupa

===== Graphium teredon (southern / narrow-banded bluebottle) =====
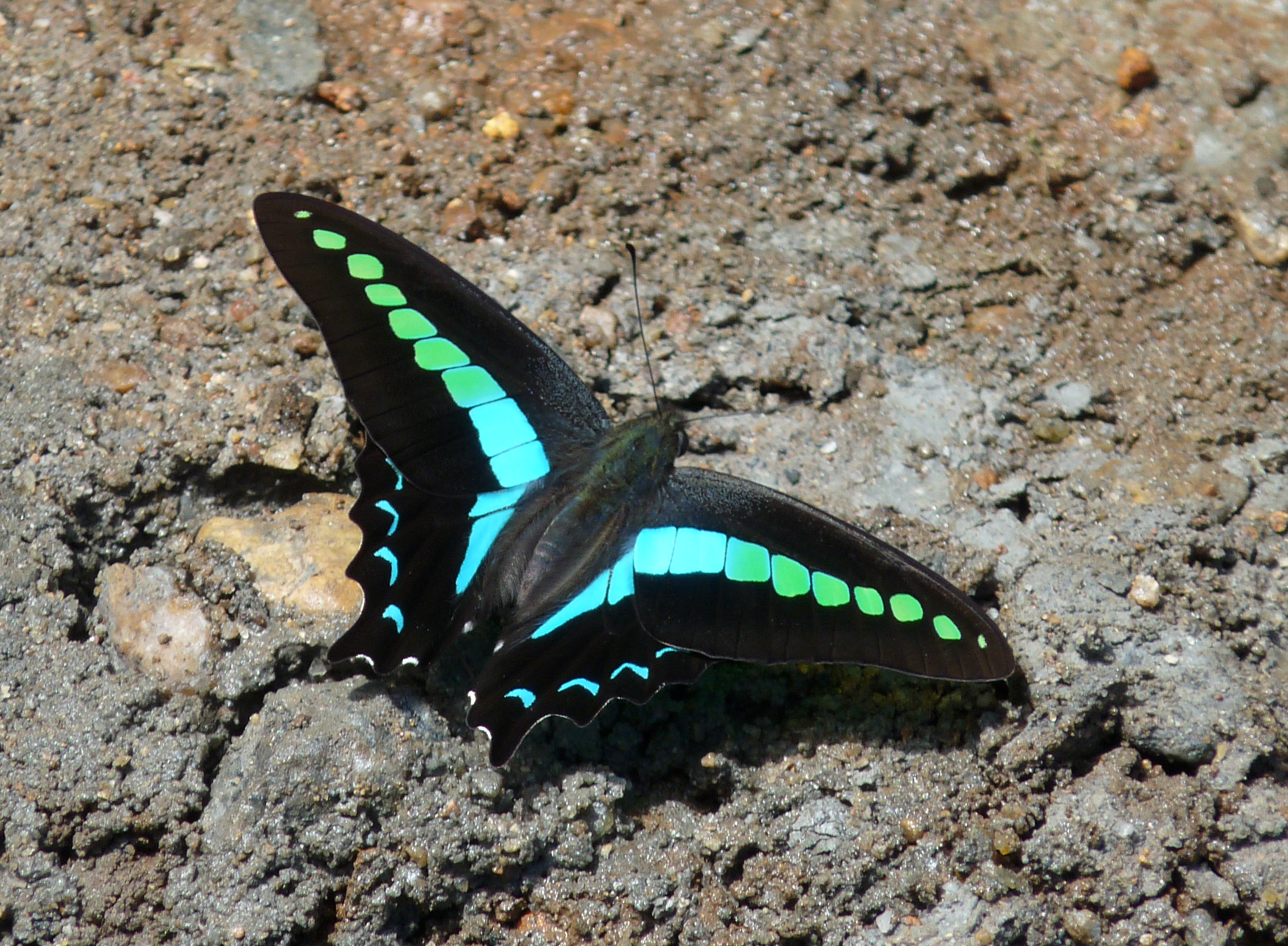
Dorsal view

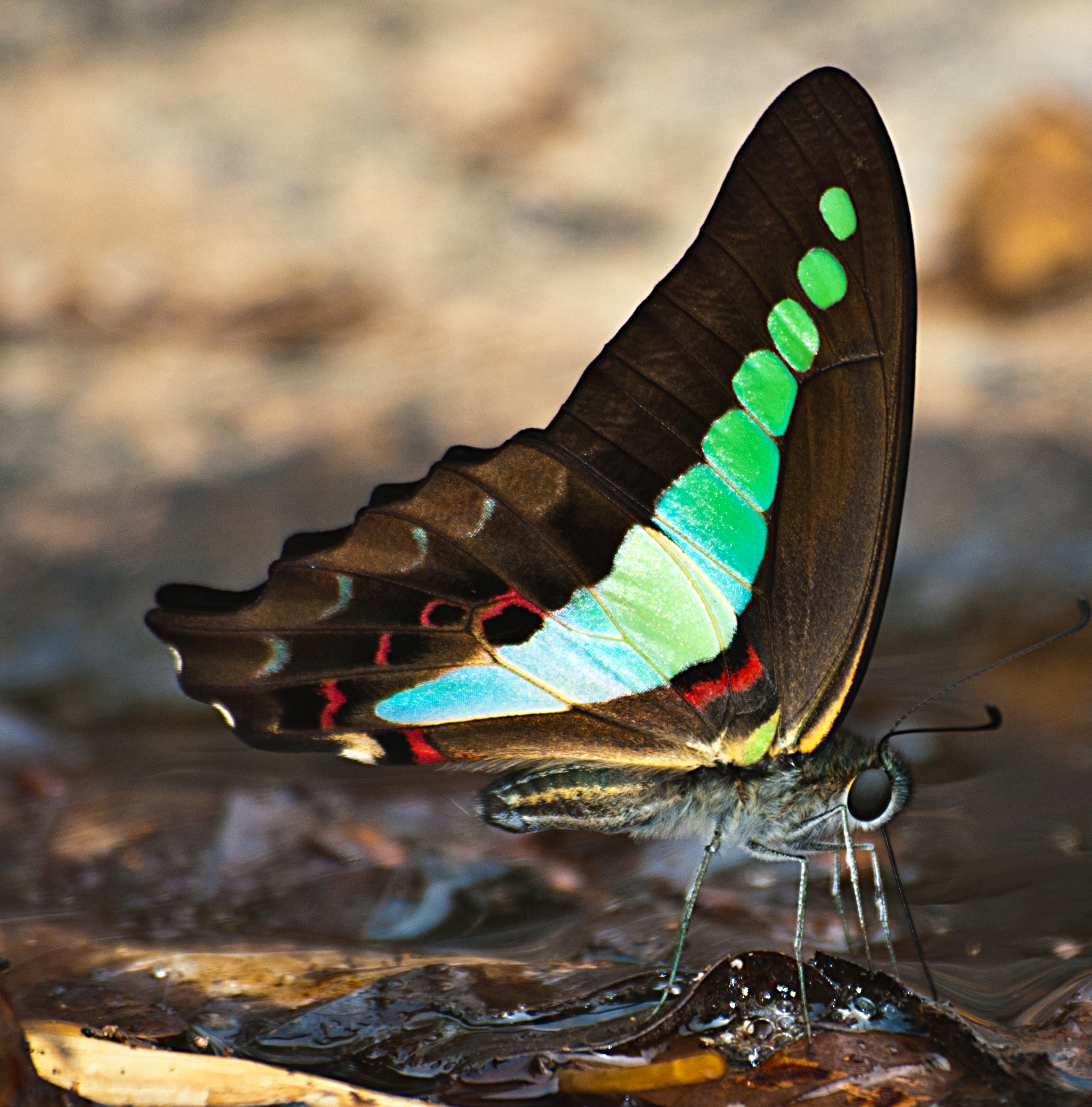
Ventral view

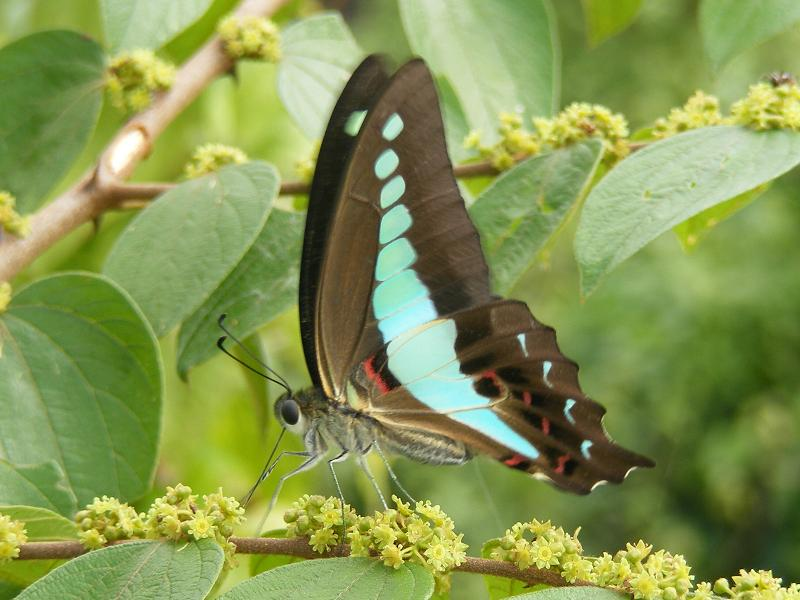
Ventral view

==== Genus: Pachliopta (red-bodied swallowtail, roses) ====
===== Pachliopta aristolochiae (common rose) =====
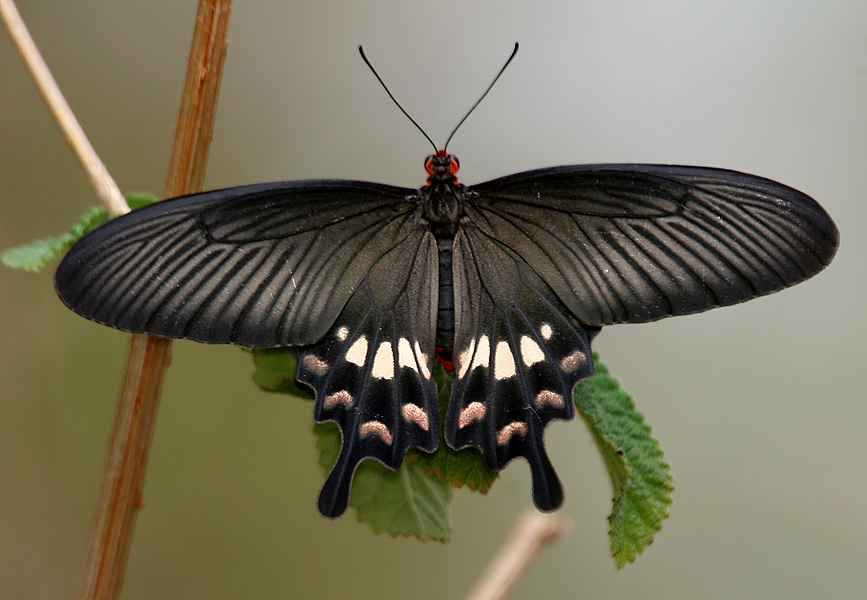
Dorsal view

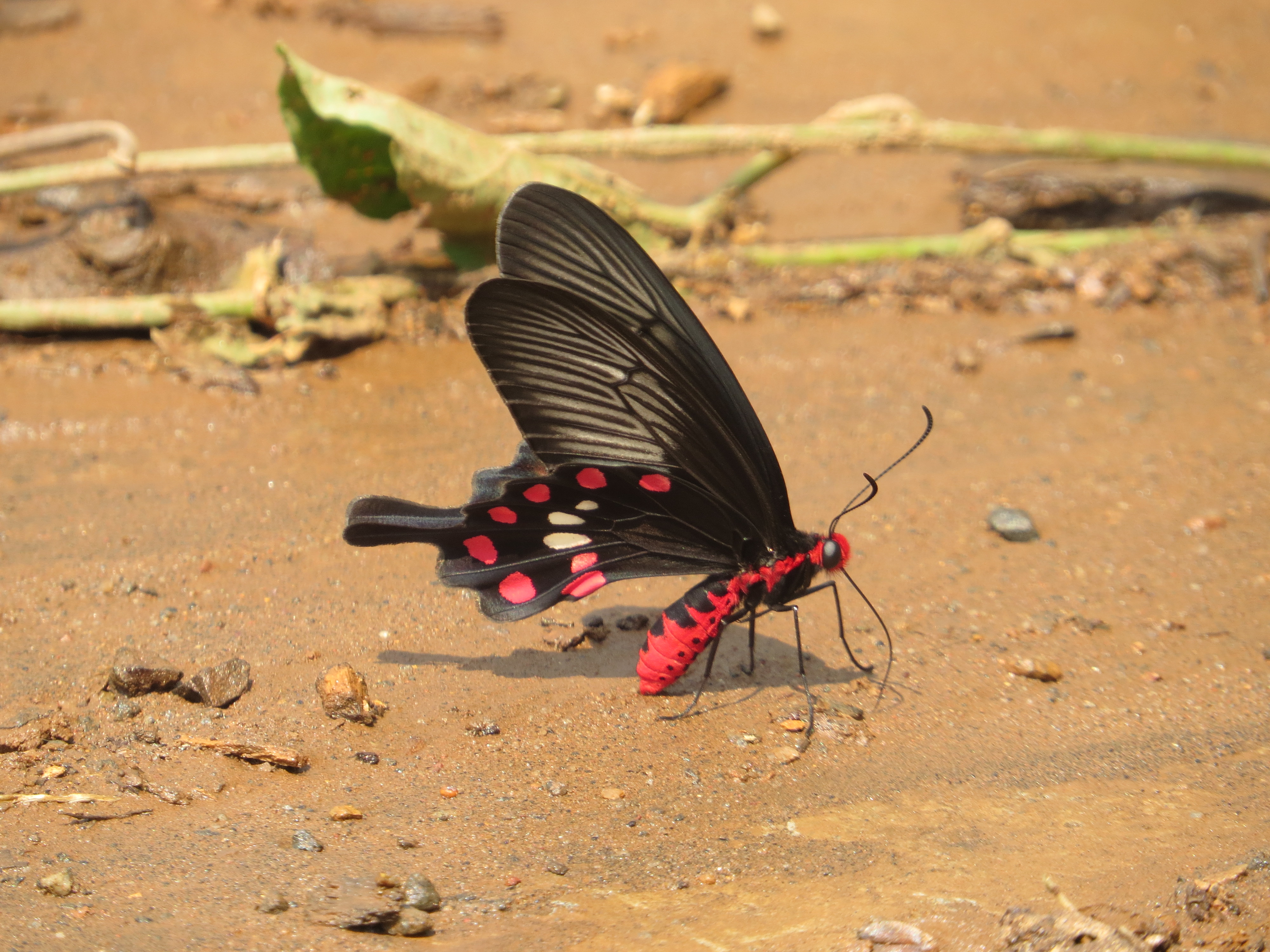
Ventral view

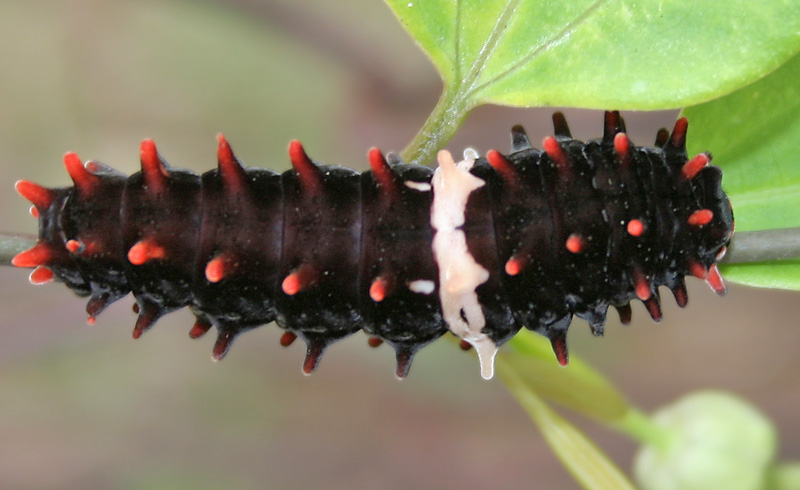
Larva

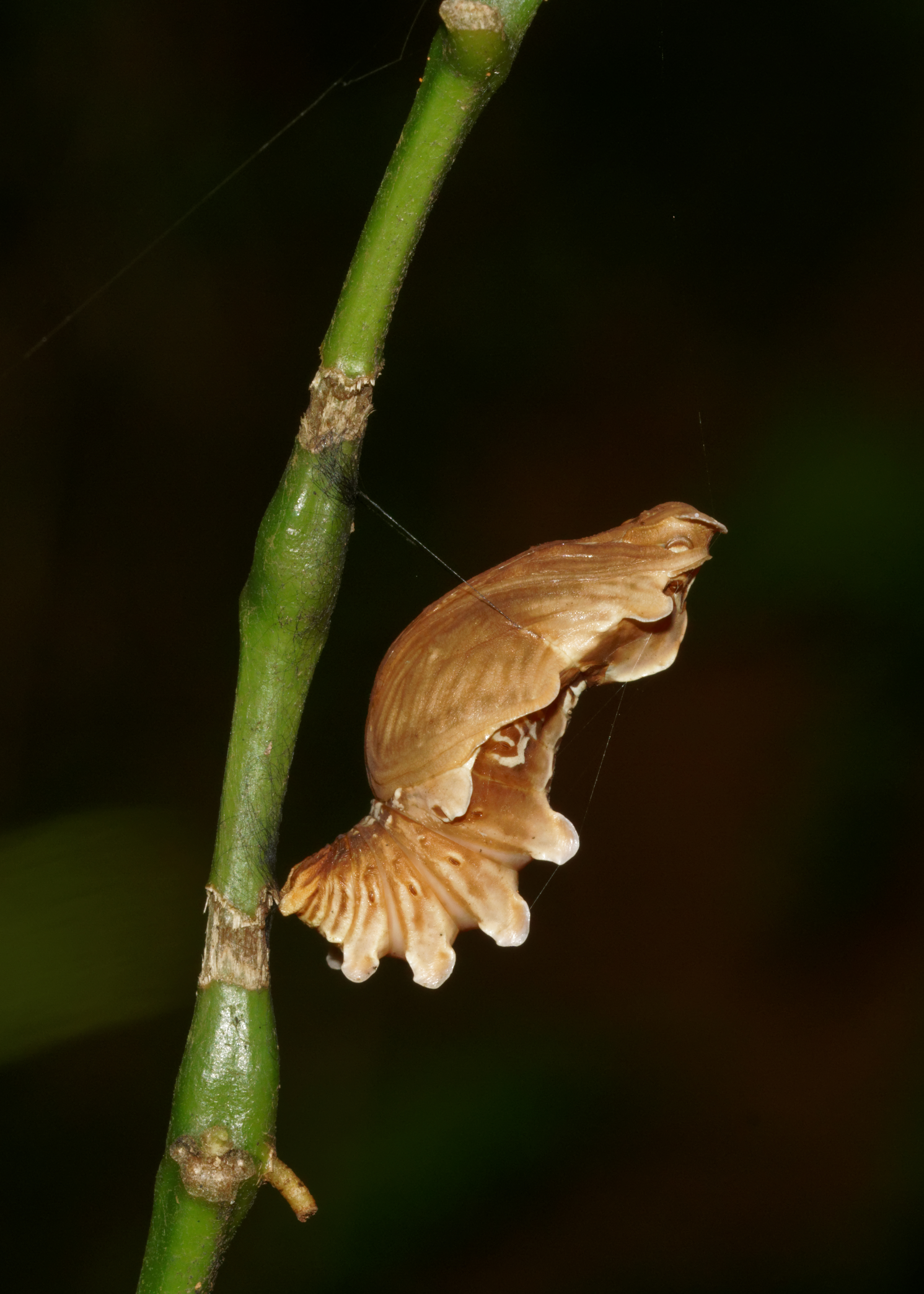
Pupa

===== Pachliopta hector (crimson rose) =====
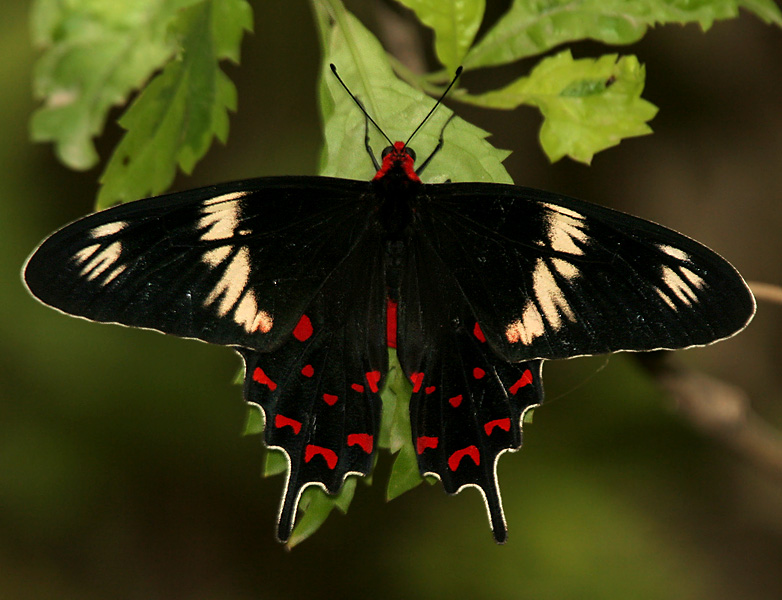
Dorsal view

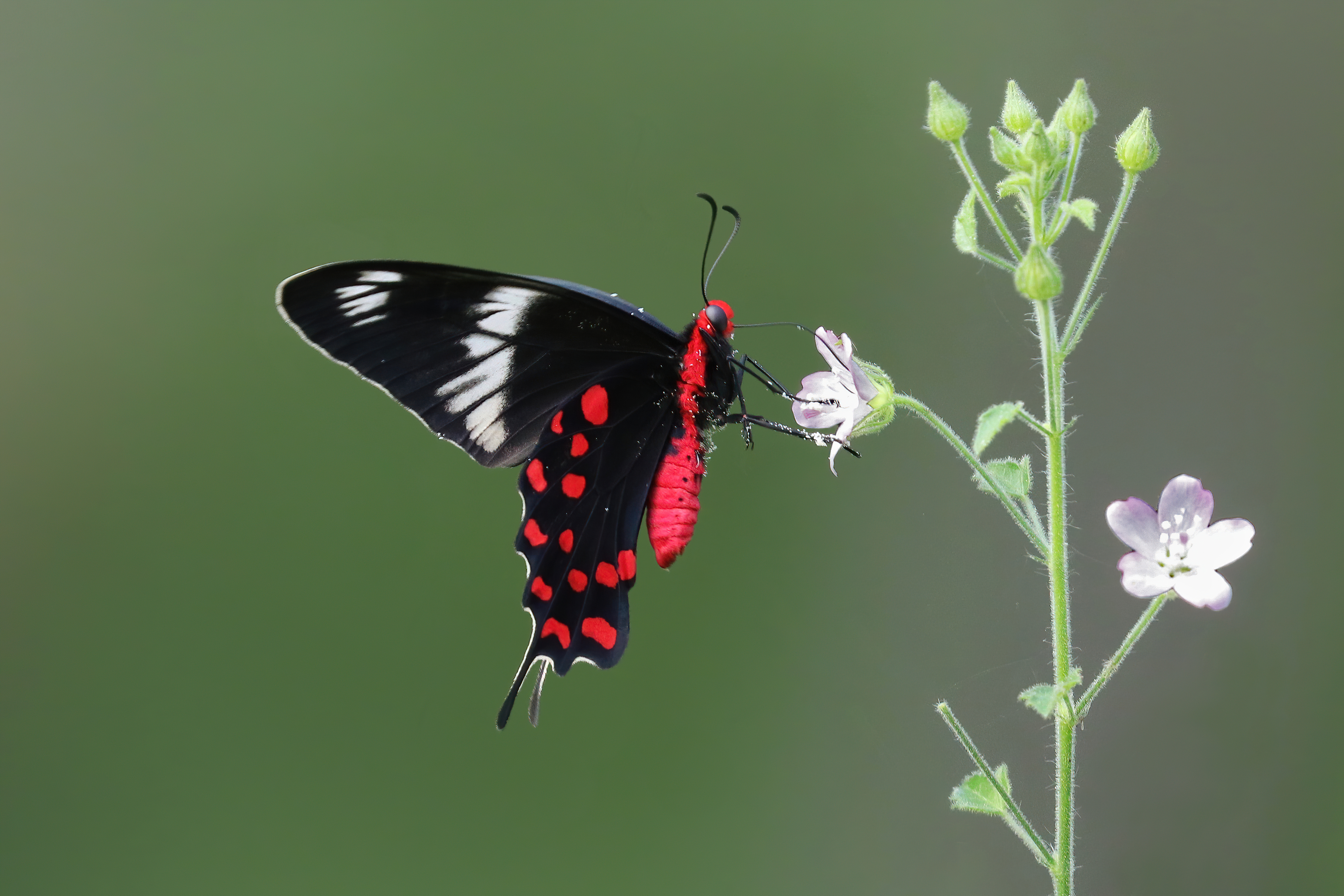
Ventral view

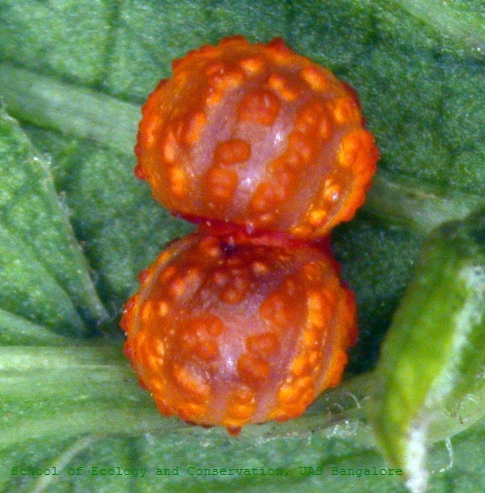
Eggs

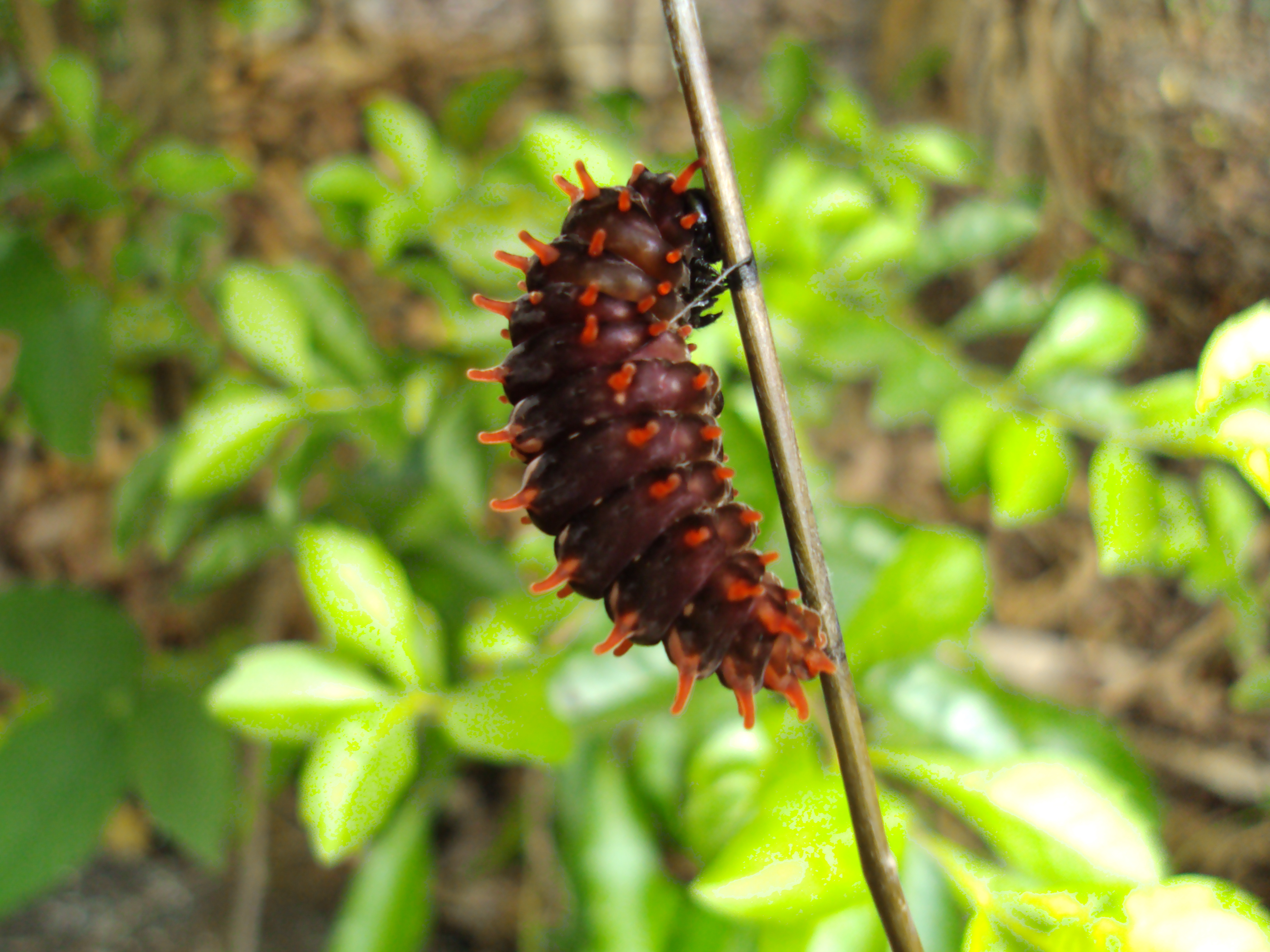
Prepupa

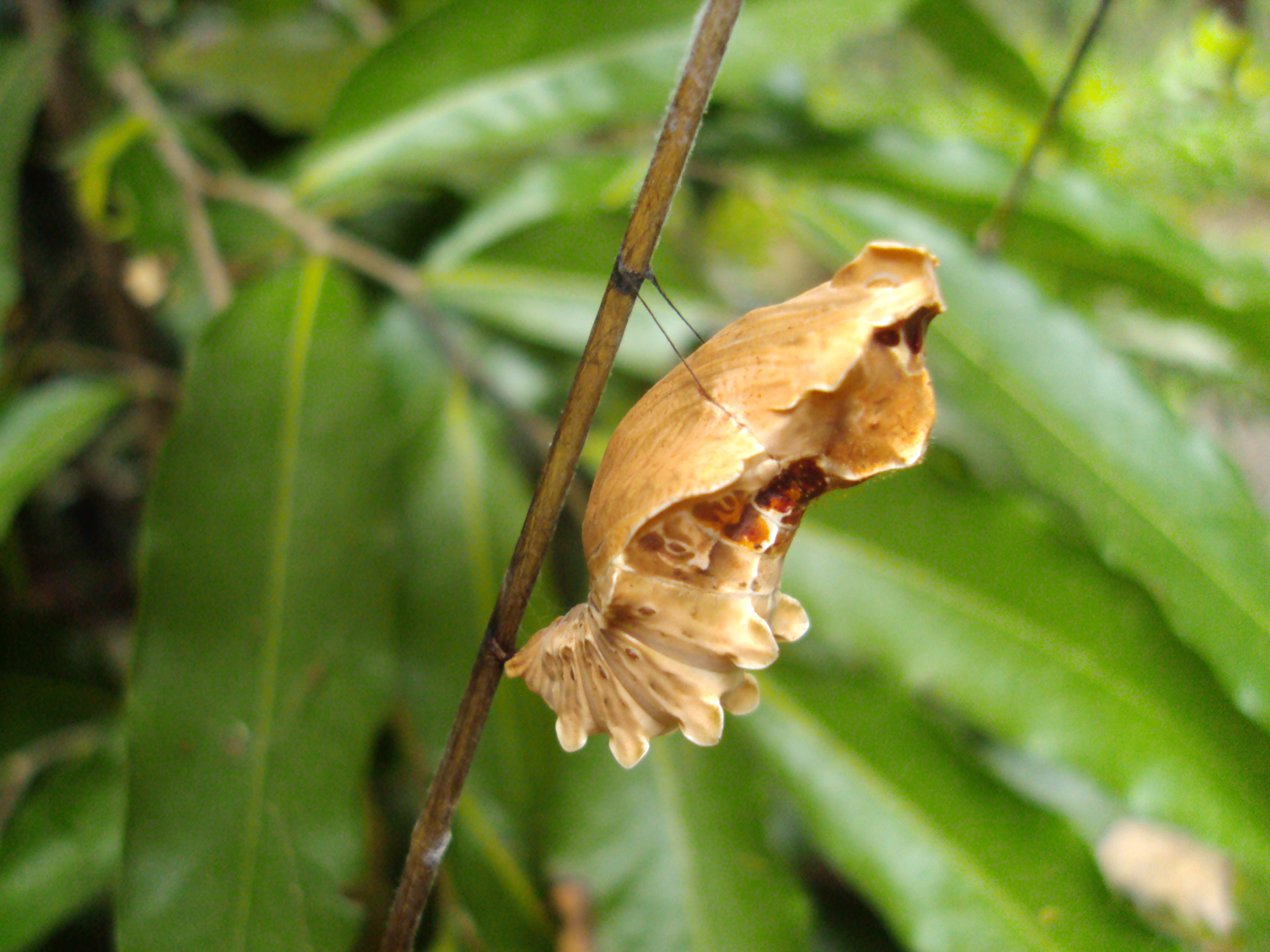
Pupa

===== Pachliopta pandiyana (Malabar rose) =====
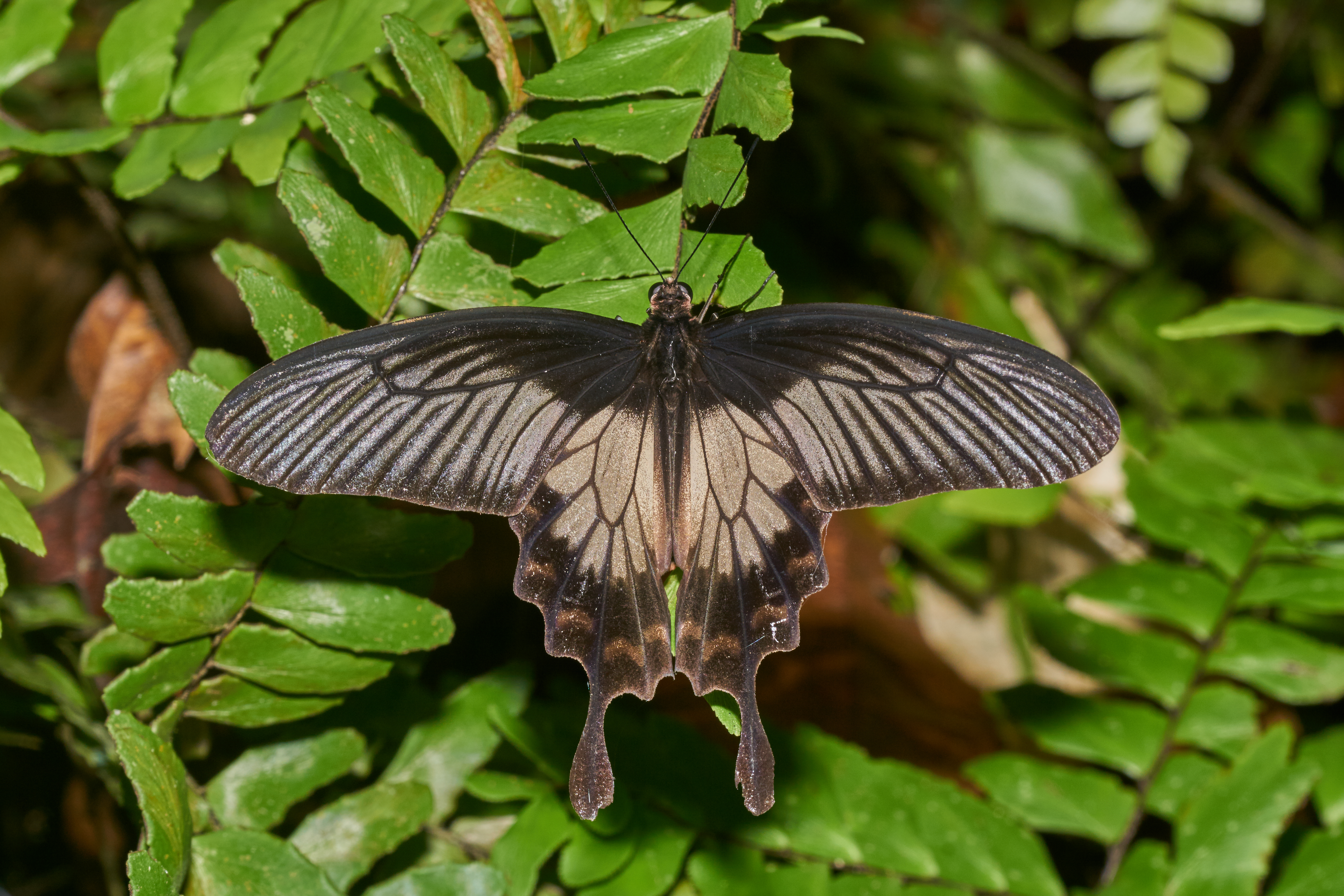
Dorsal view

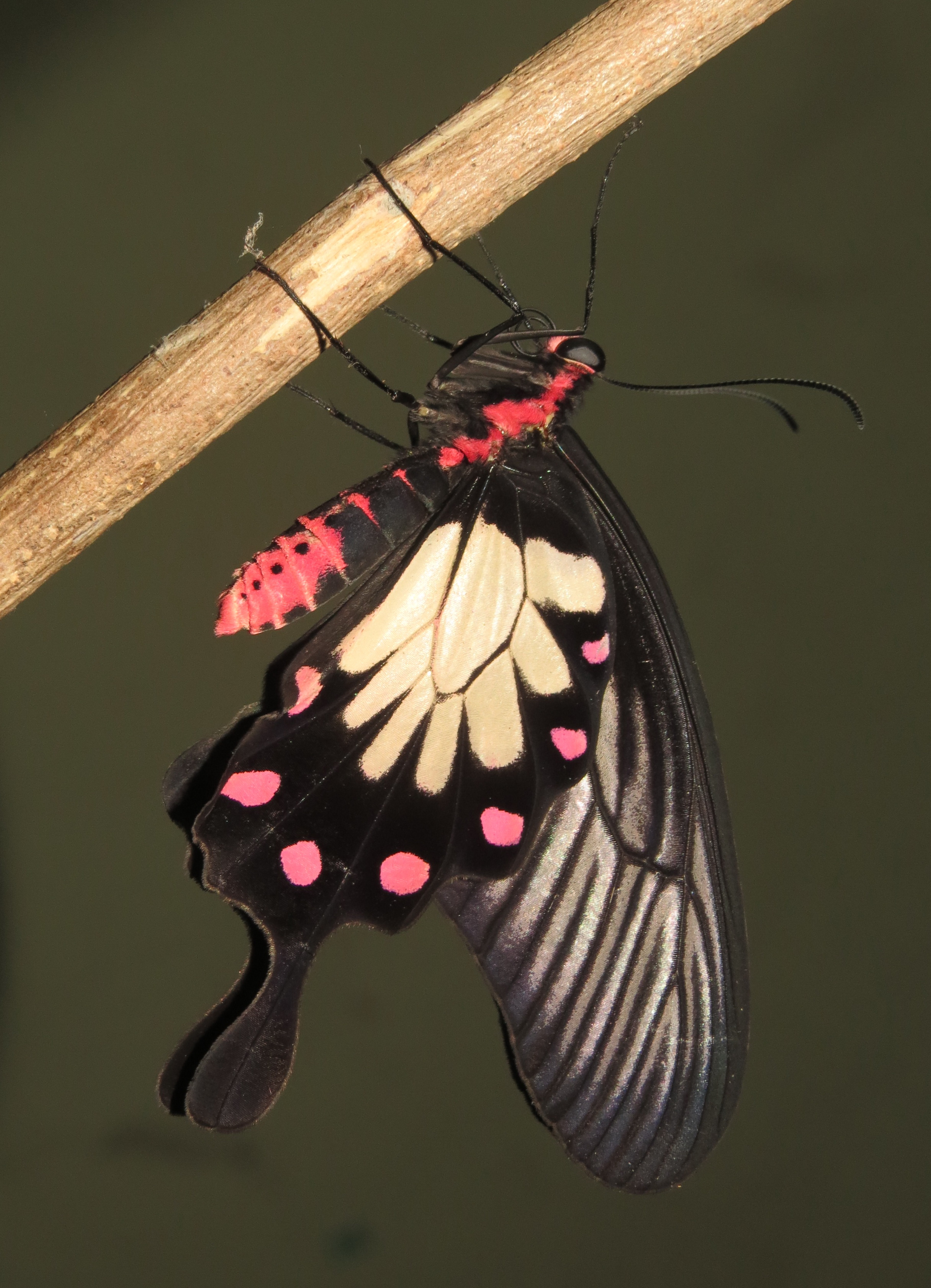
Ventral view

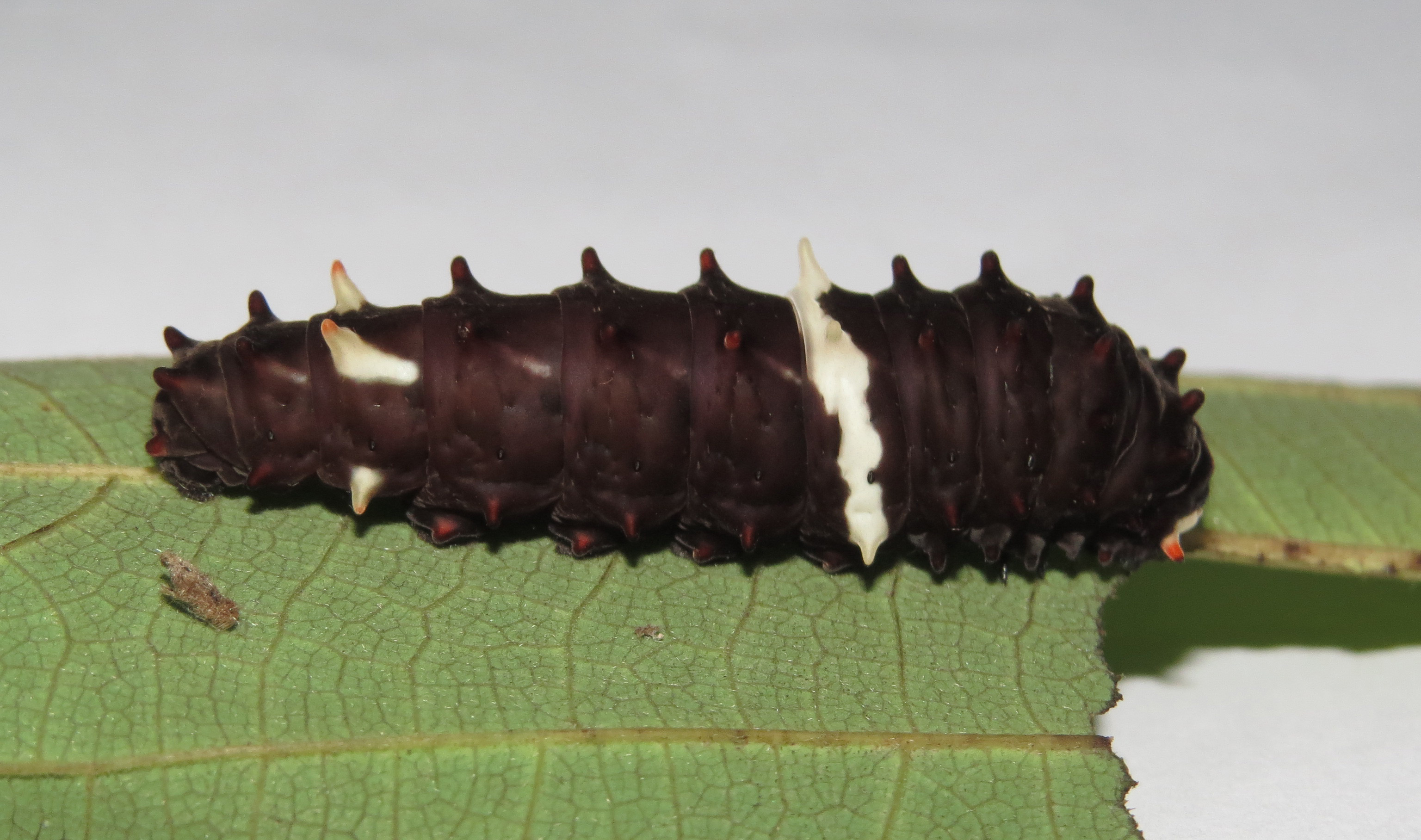
Larva

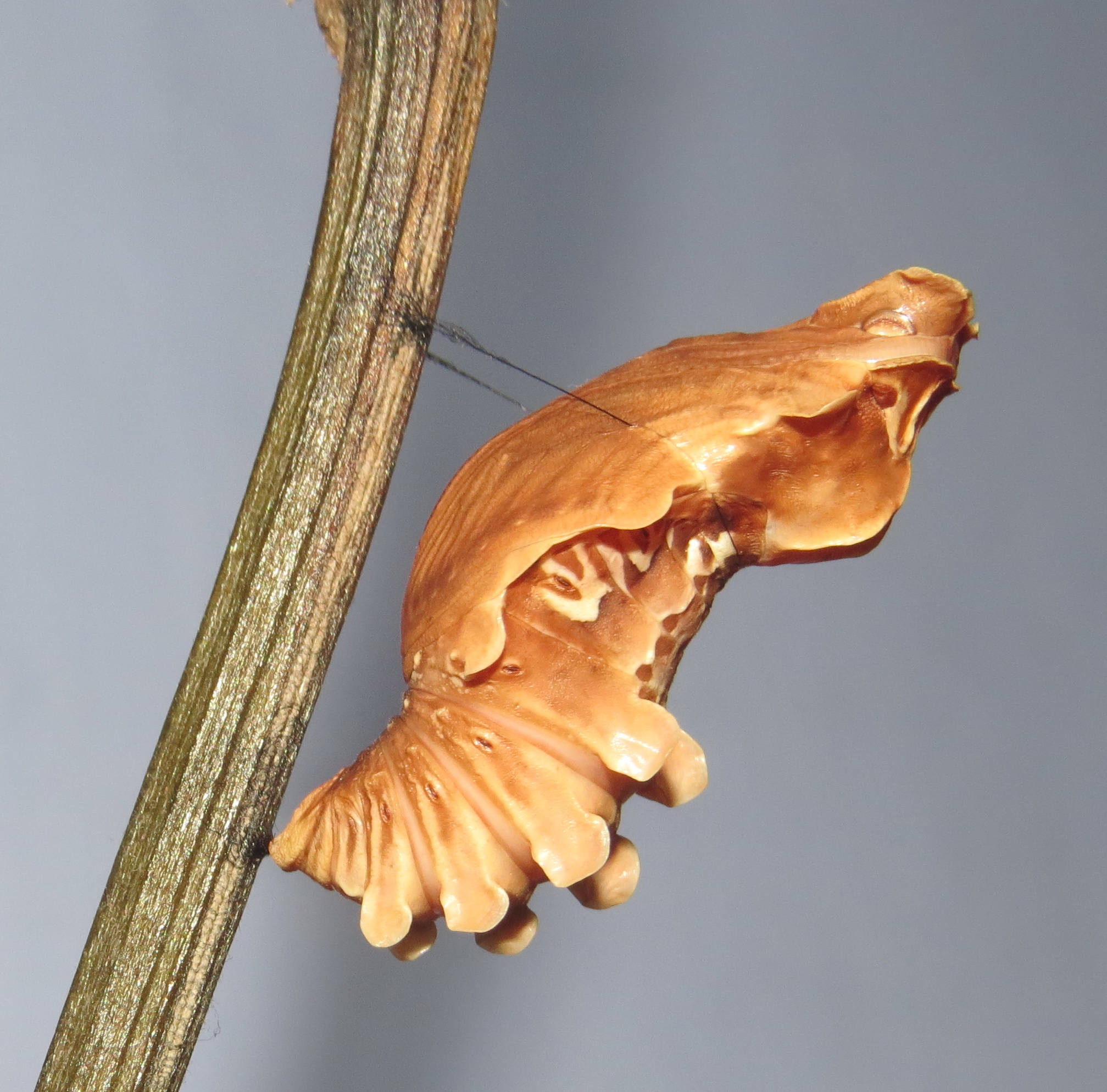
Pupa

==== Genus: Papilio (swallowtails, mimes) ====
===== Papilio buddha (Malabar banded peacock) =====
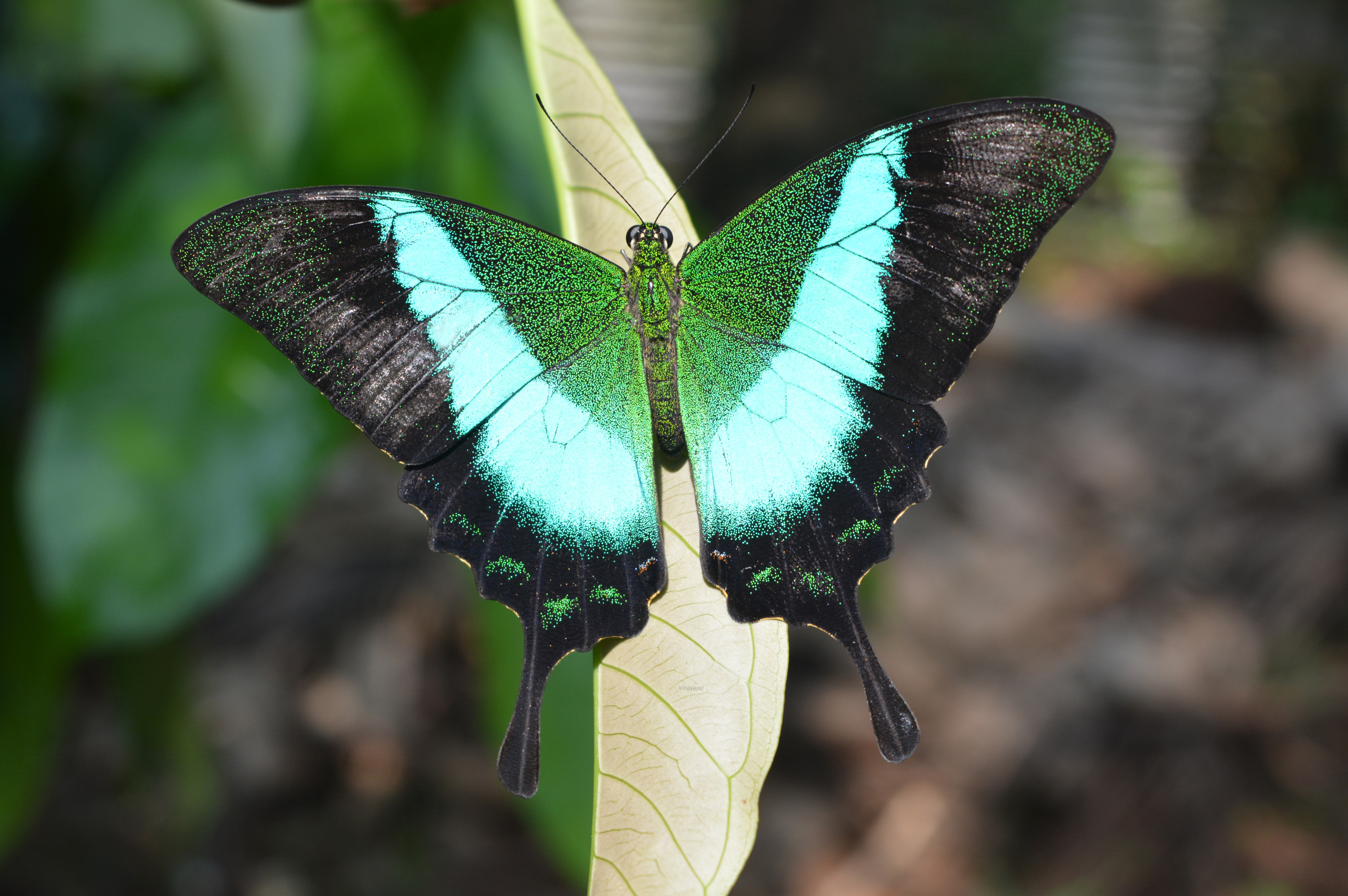
Dorsal view

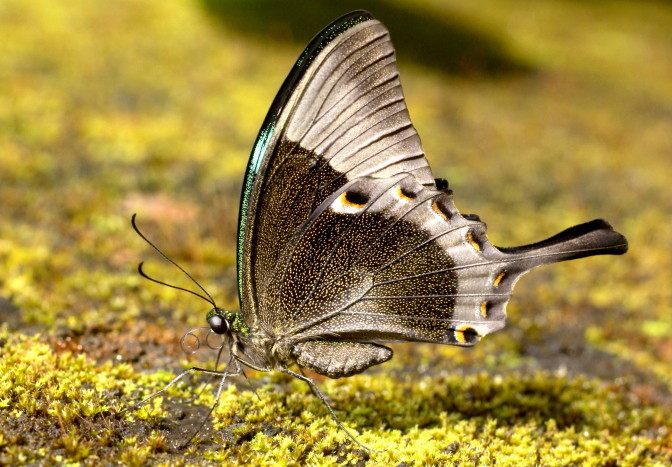
Ventral view

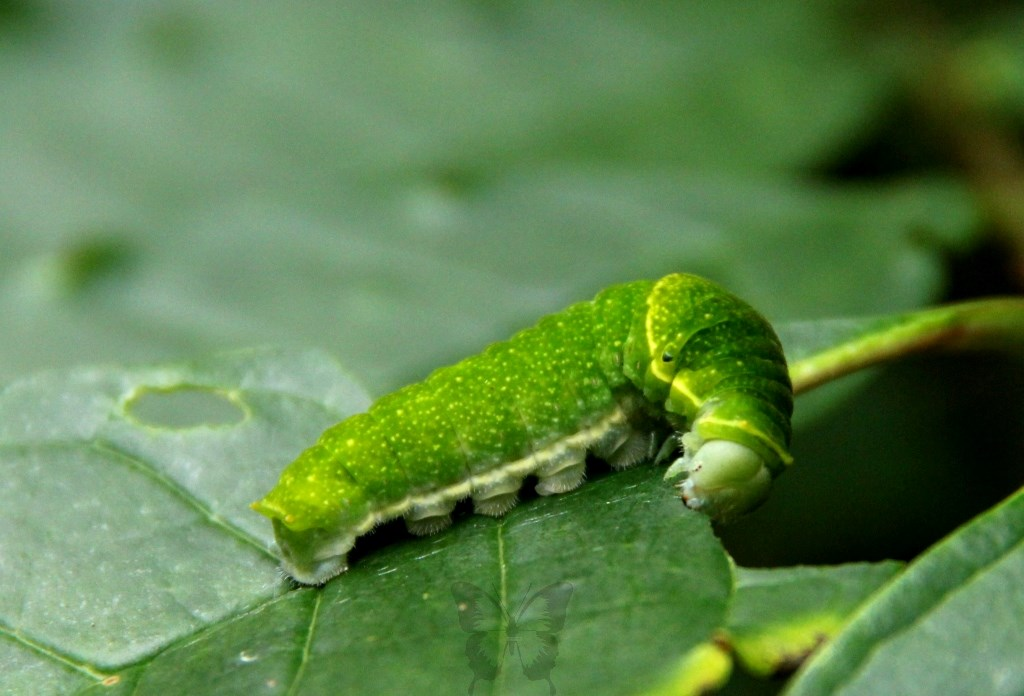
Larva

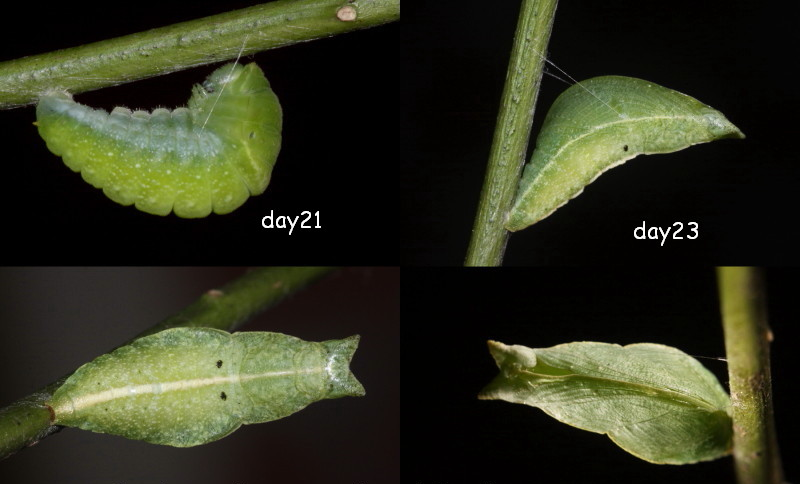
Pupa

===== Papilio clytia (common mime) =====
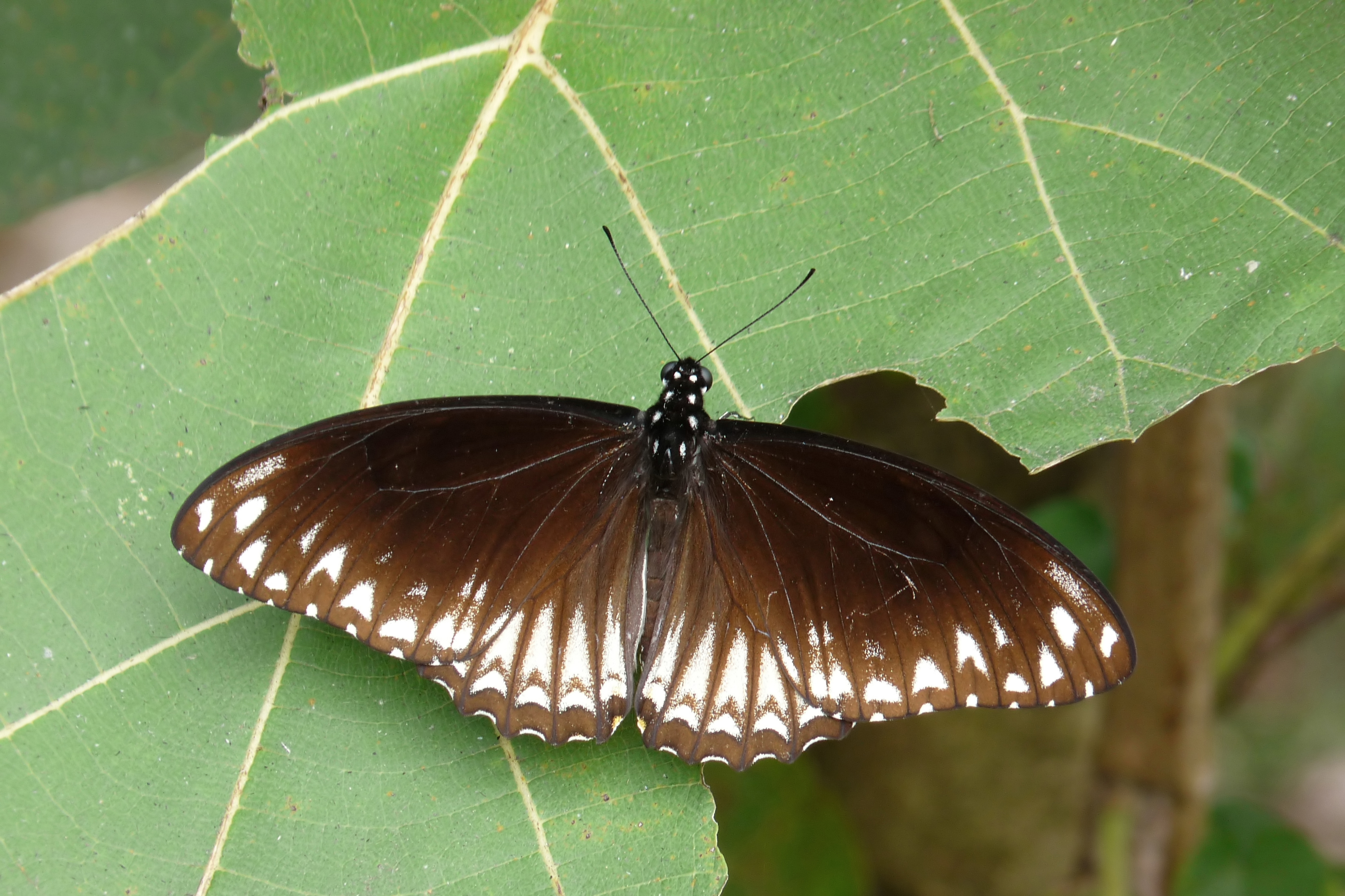
Dorsal view (Form clytia)

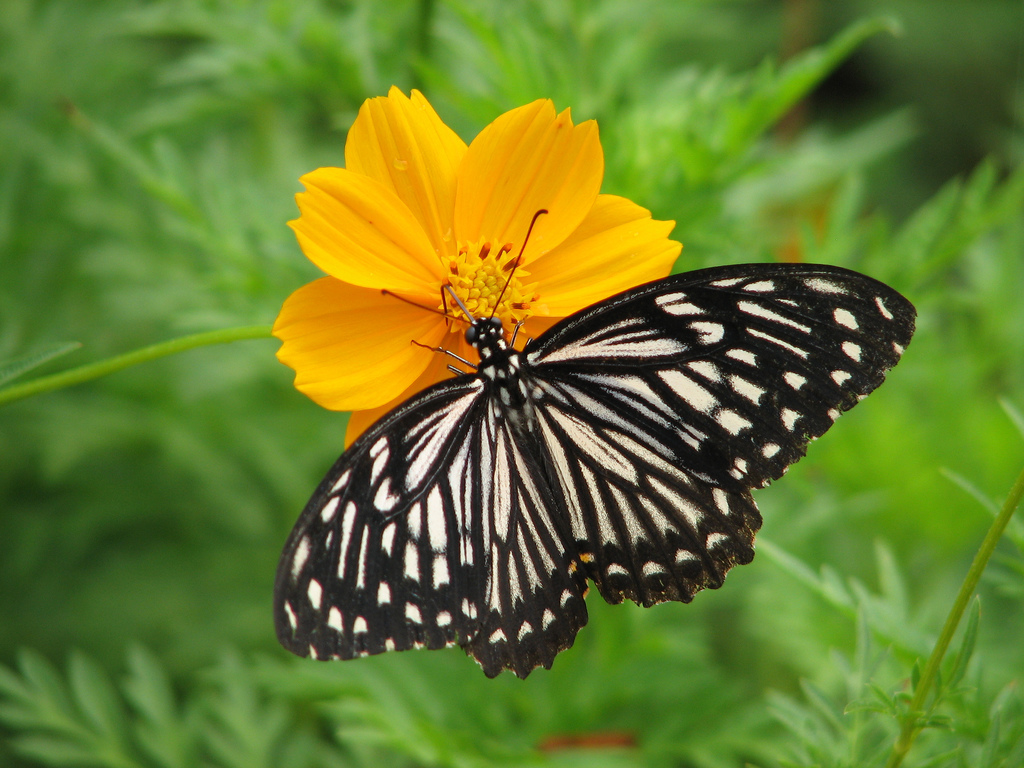
Dorsal view (Form dissimilis)

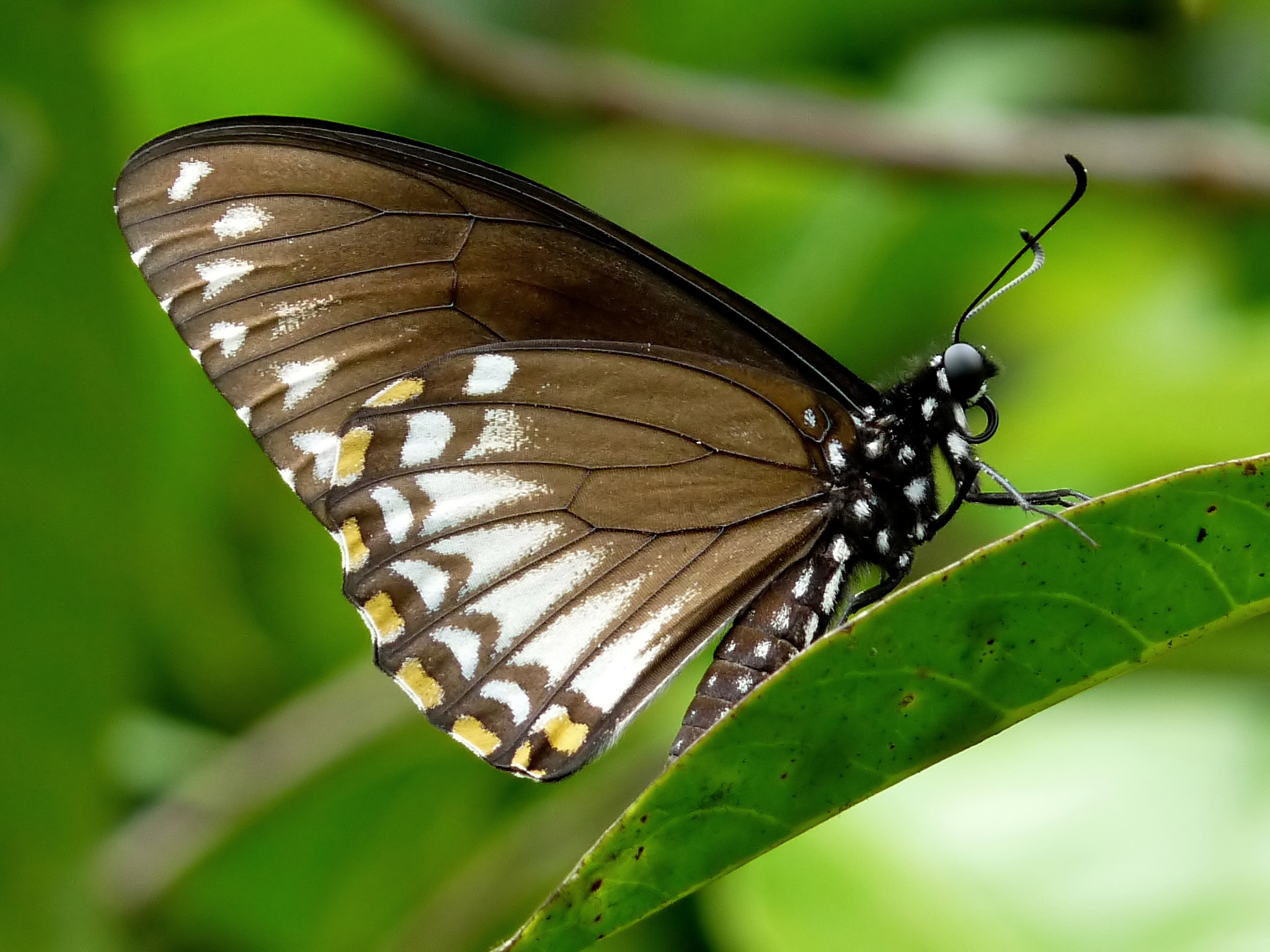
Ventral view (Form clytia)

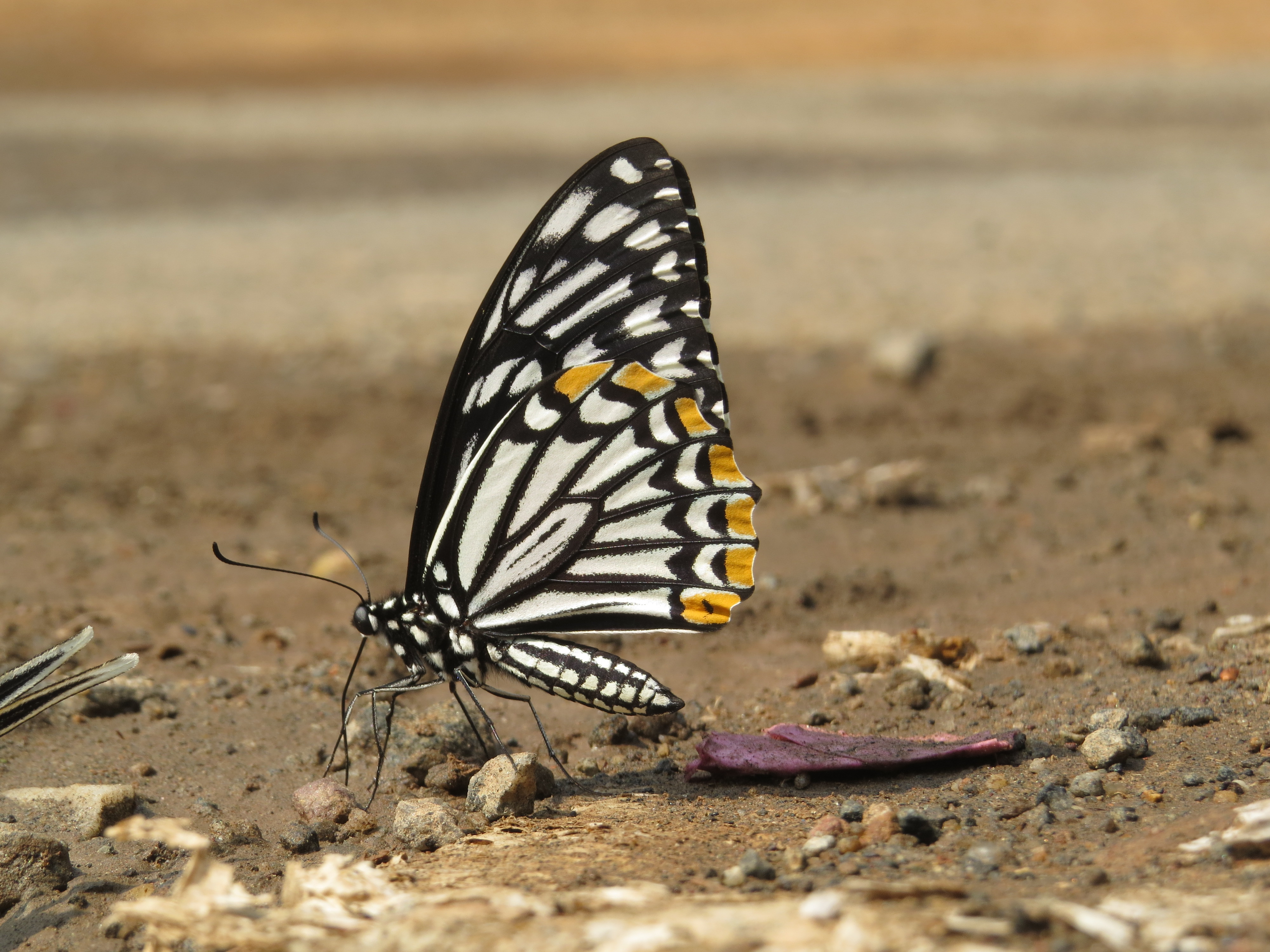
Ventral view (Form dissimilis)

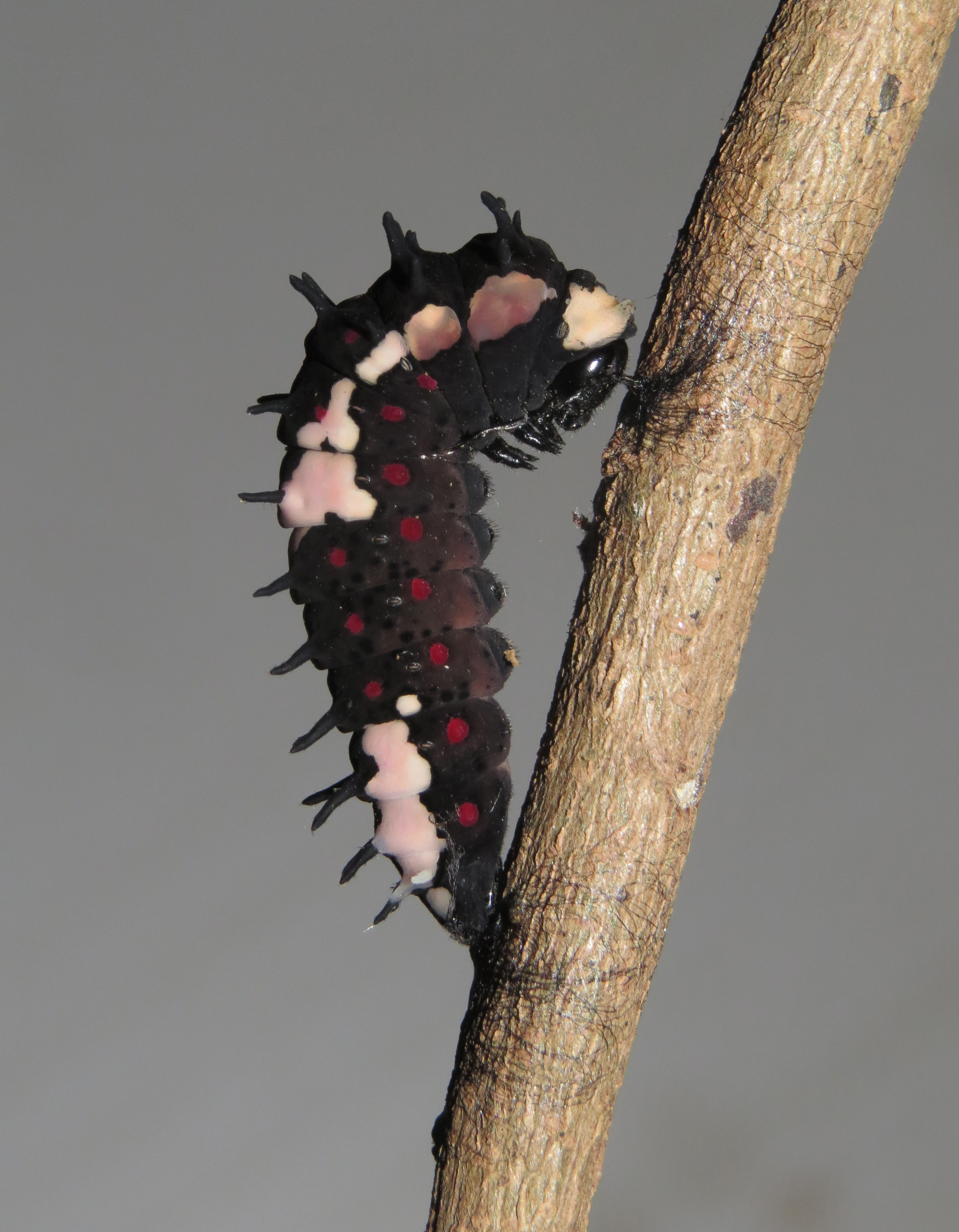
Prepupa

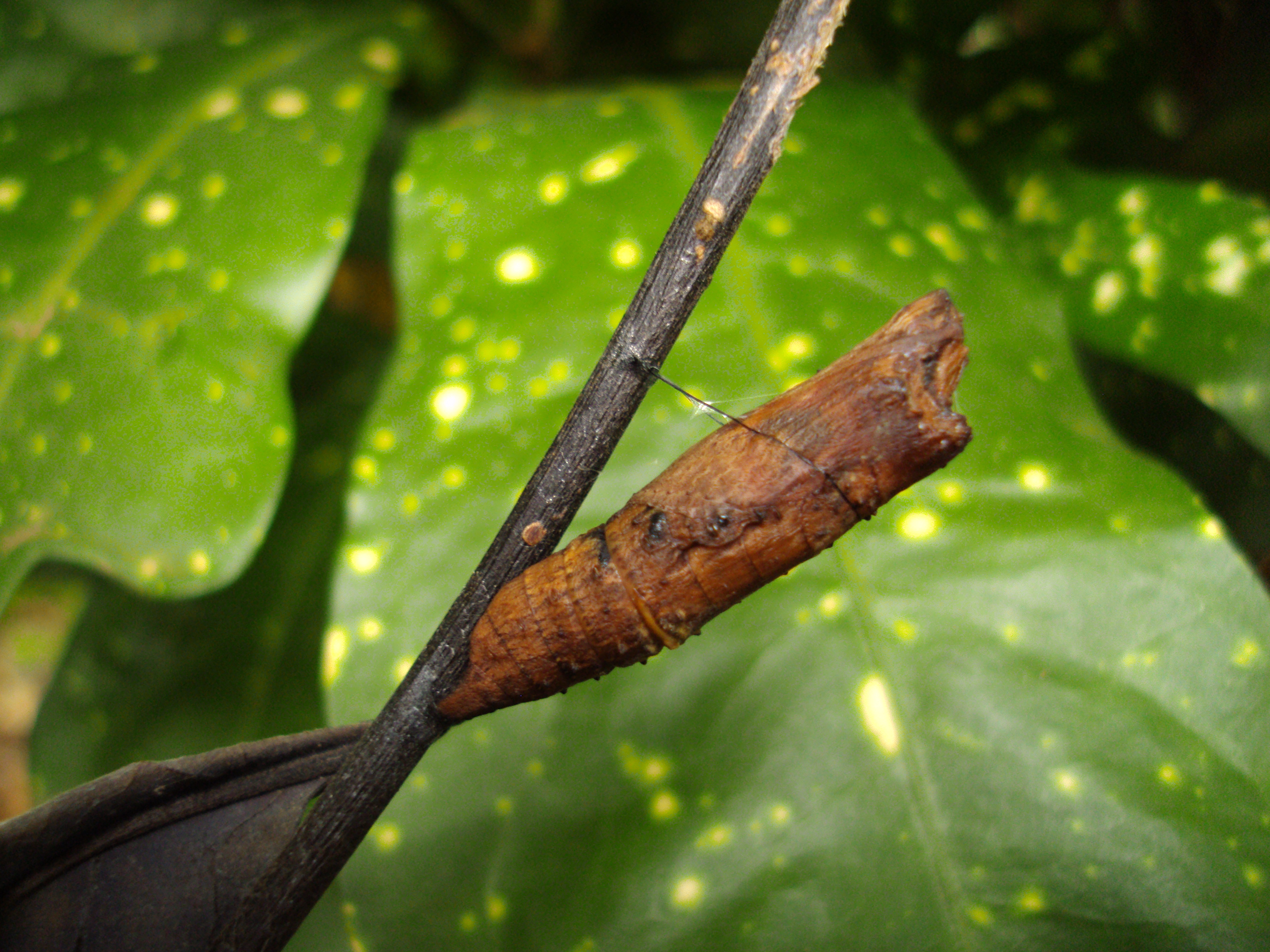
Pupa

===== Papilio crino (common banded peacock) =====
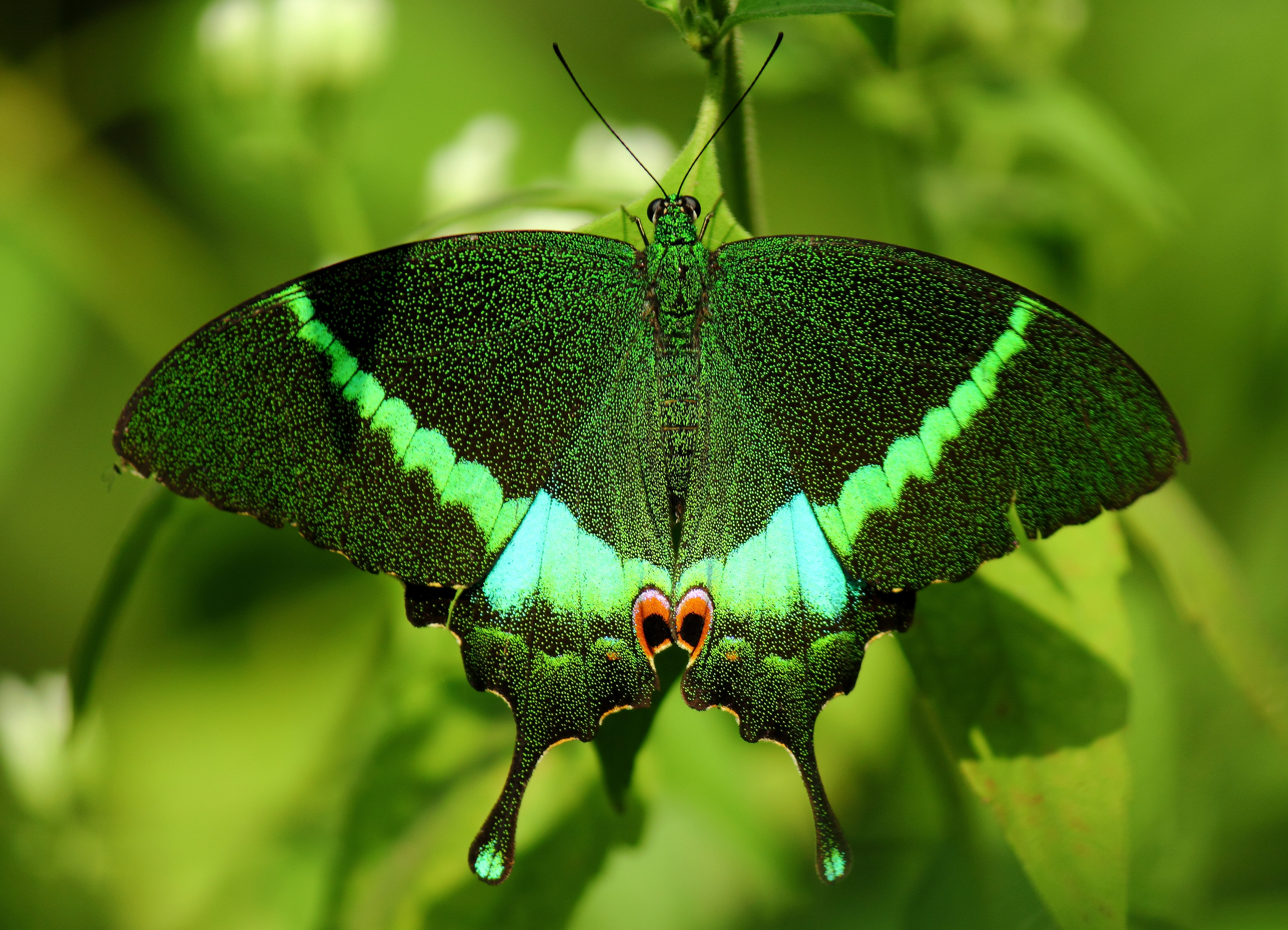
Dorsal view

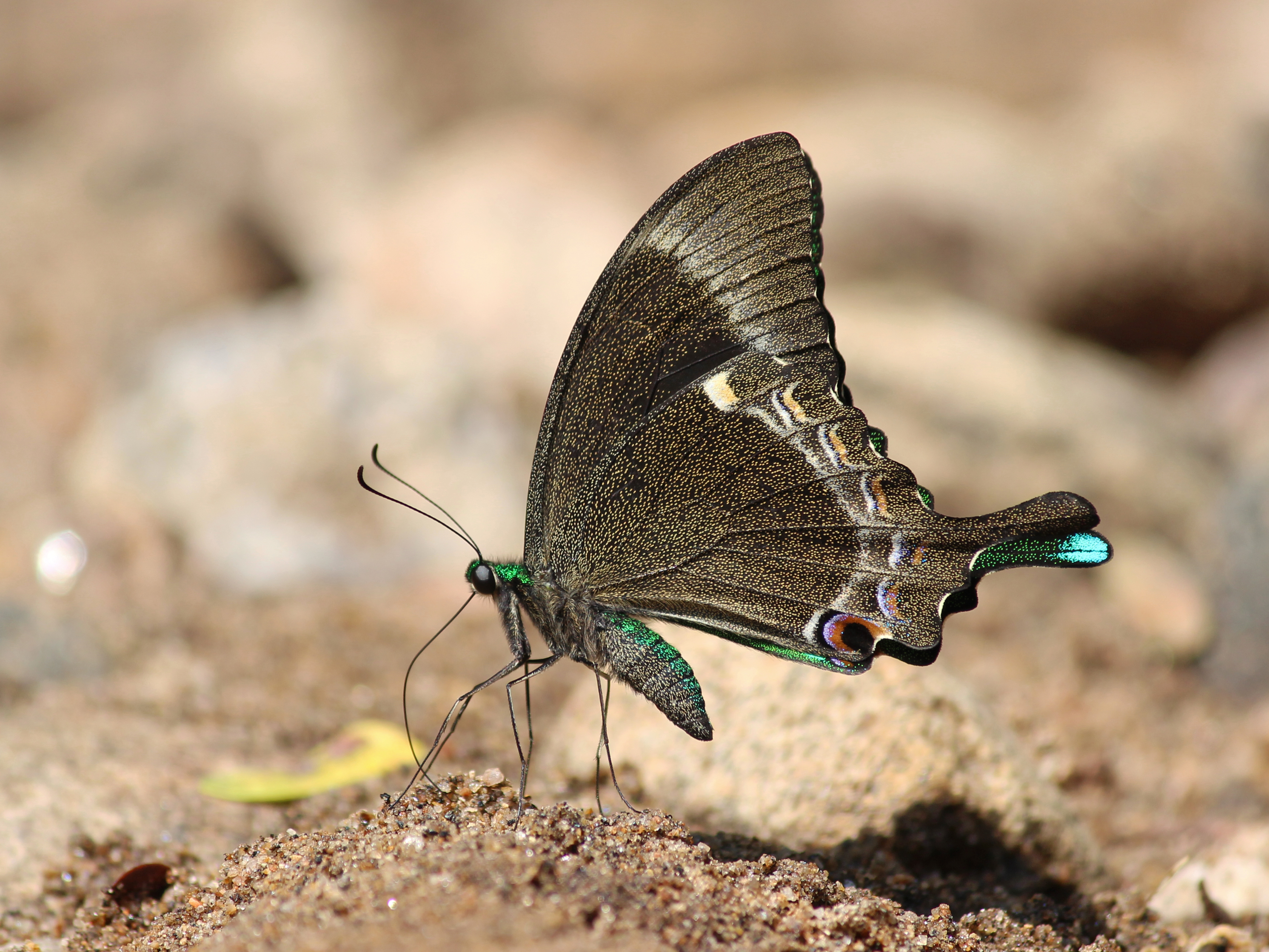
Ventral view

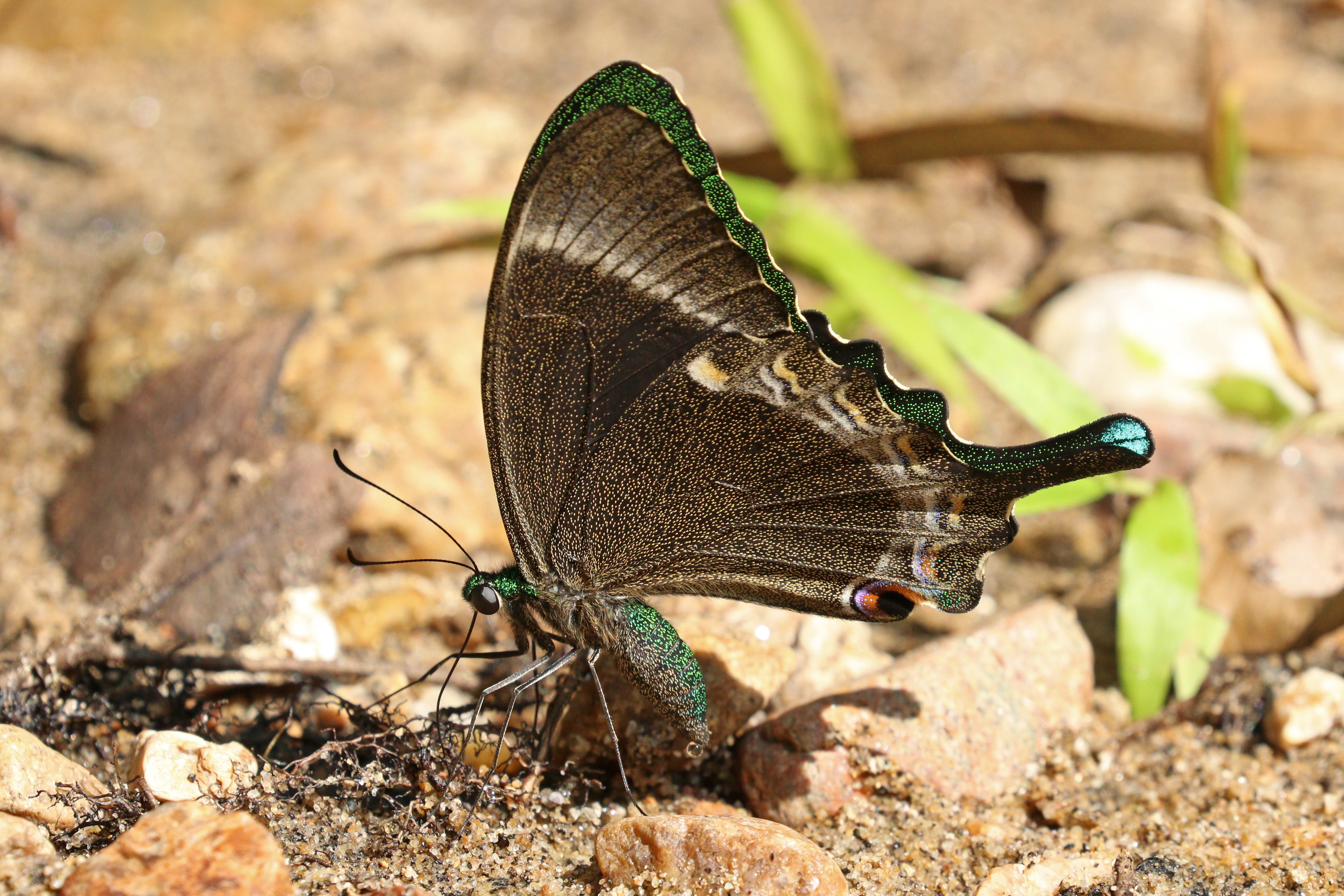
Ventral view

===== Papilio demoleus (lime butterfly) =====
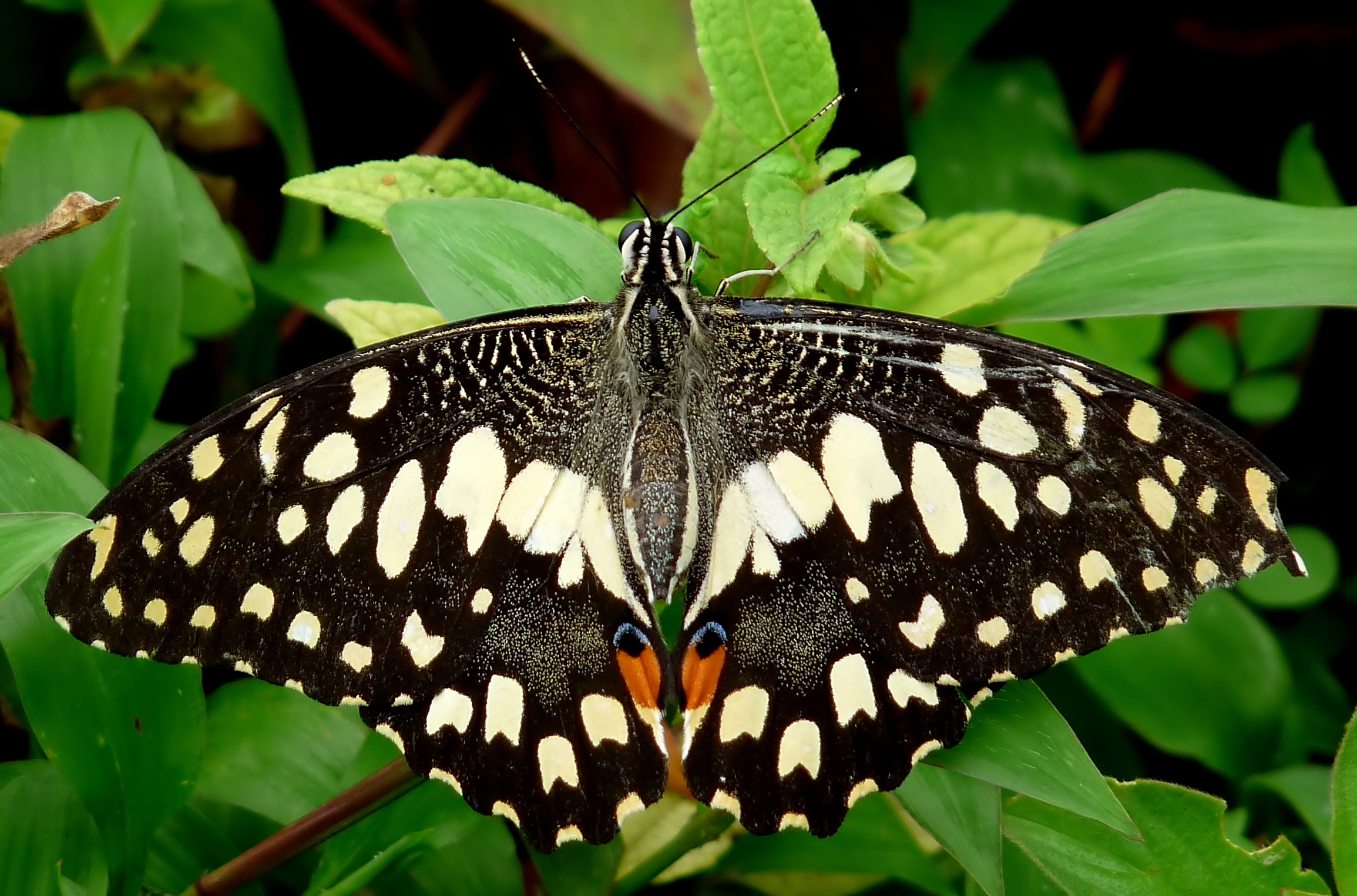
Dorsal view

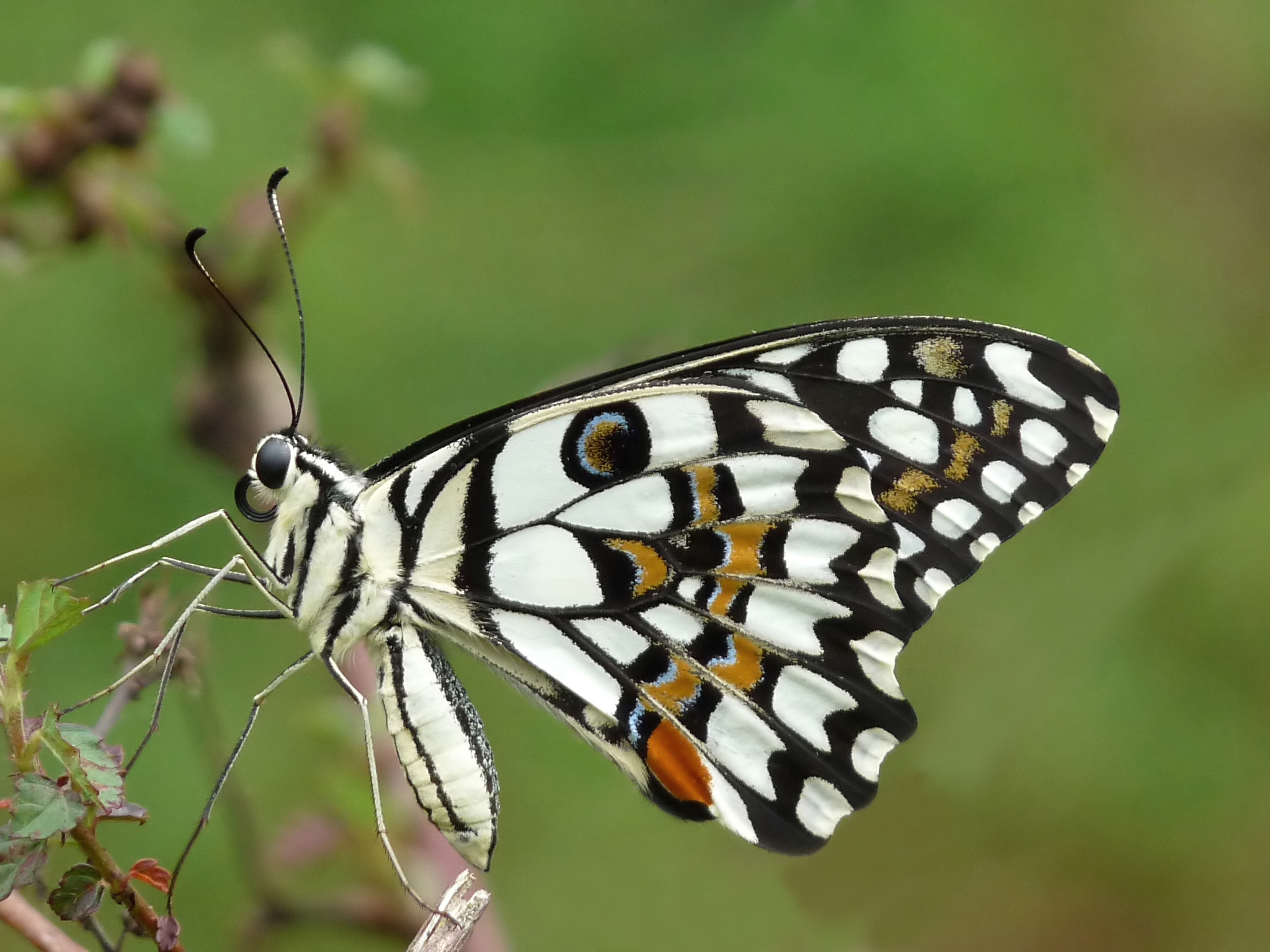
Ventral view

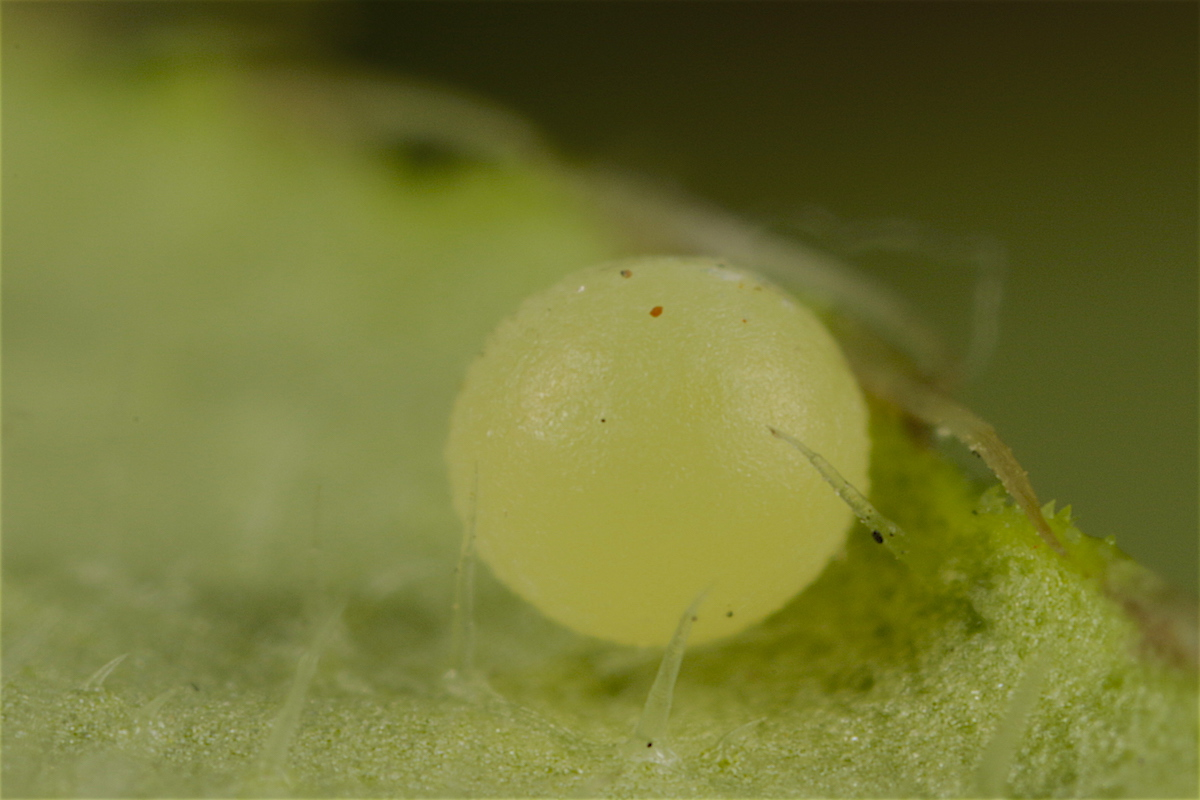
Egg

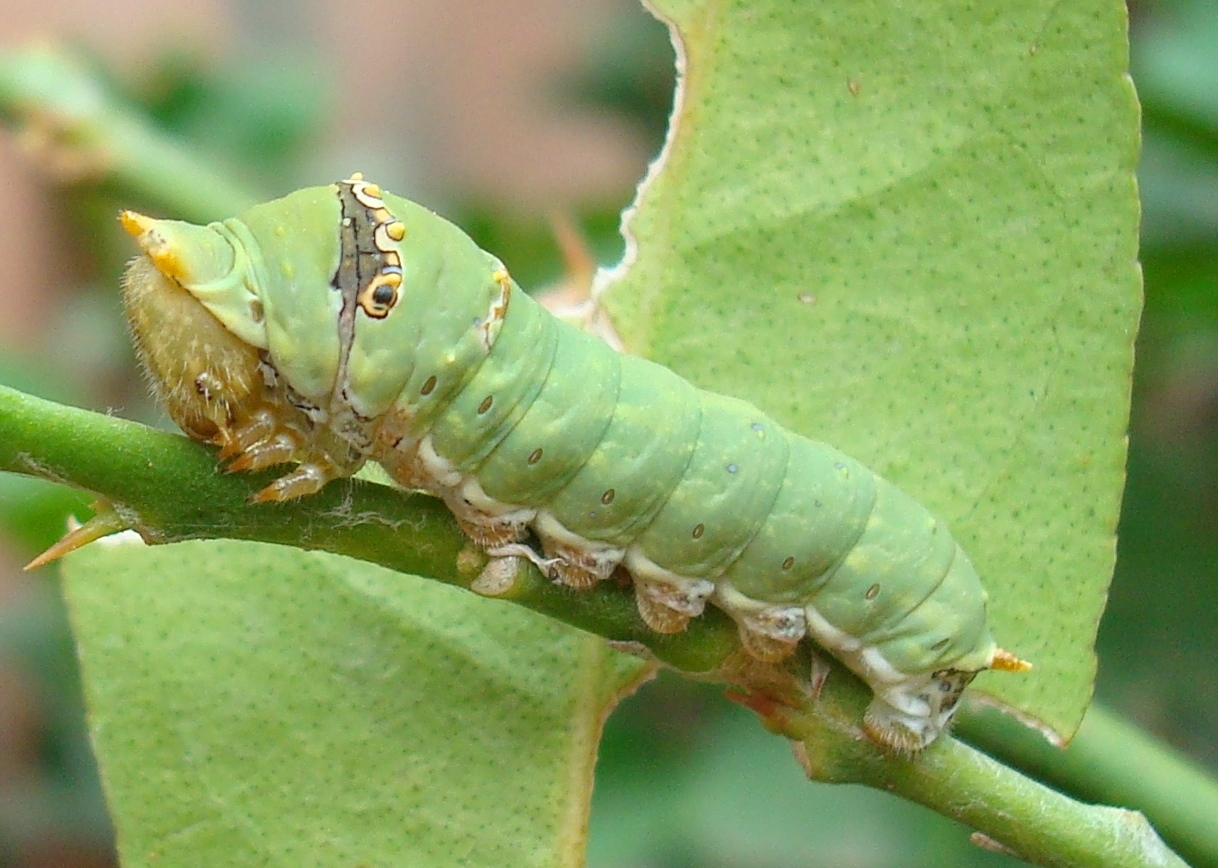
Larva

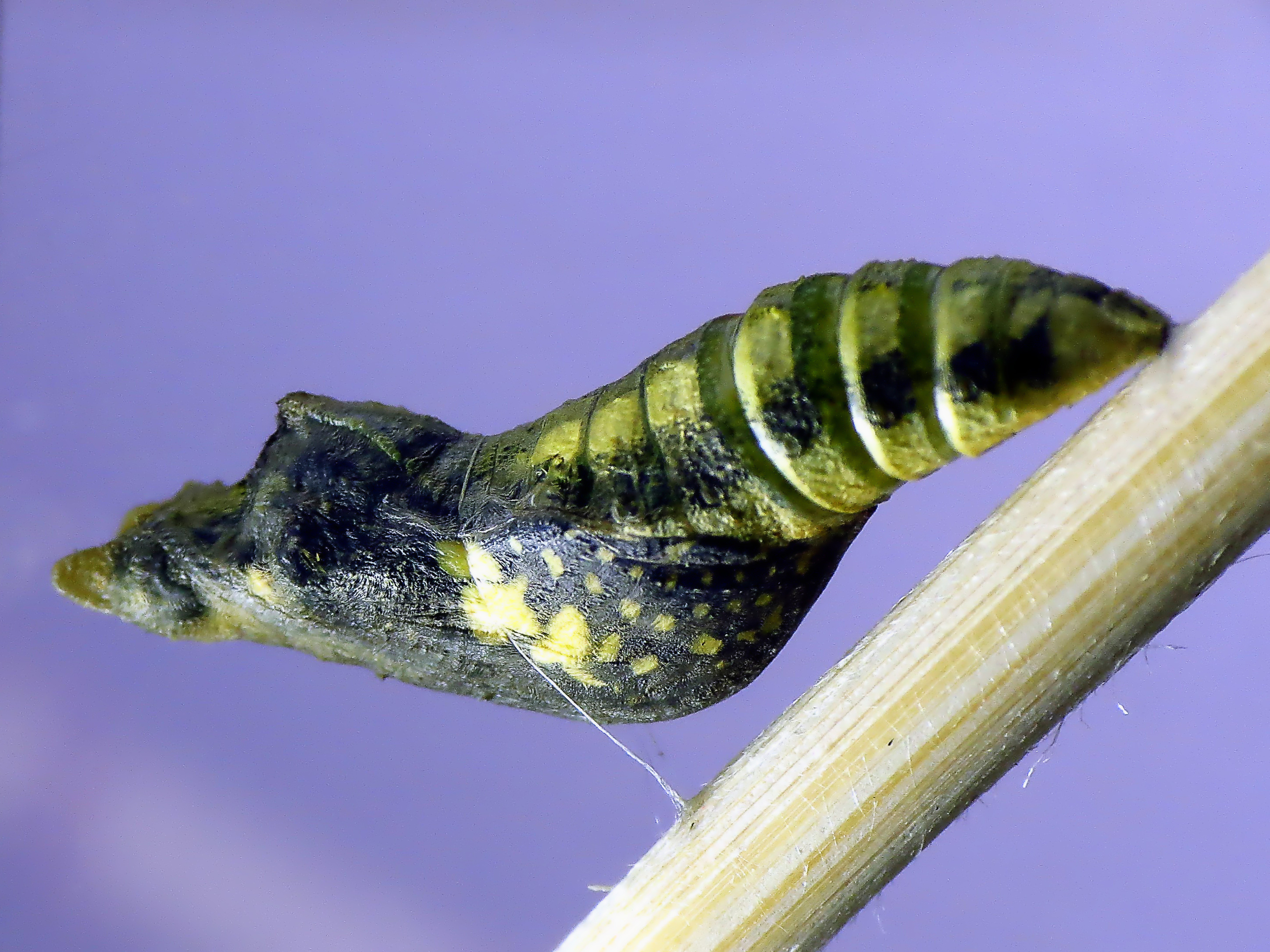
Pupa

===== Papilio dravidarum (Malabar raven) =====
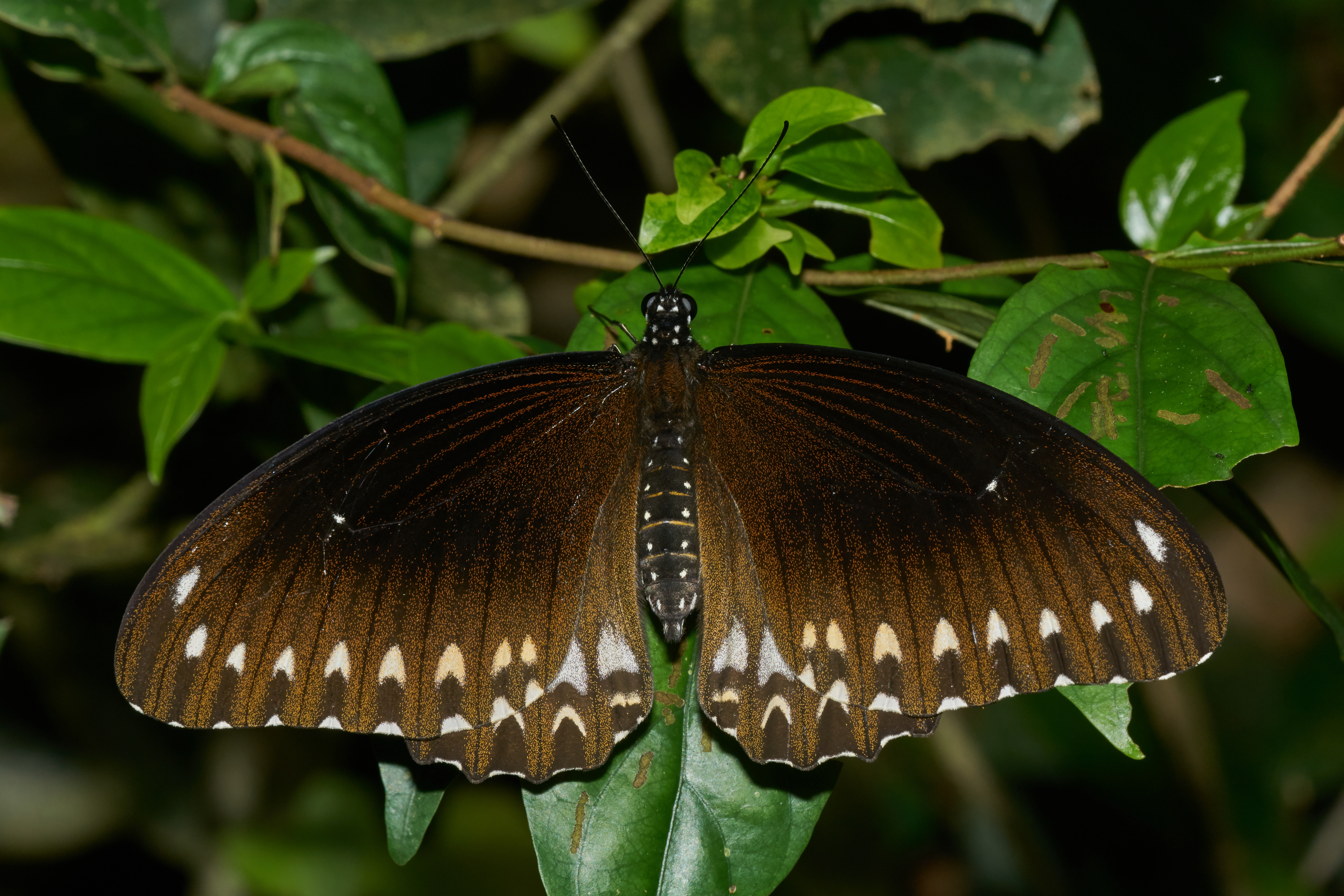
Dorsal view

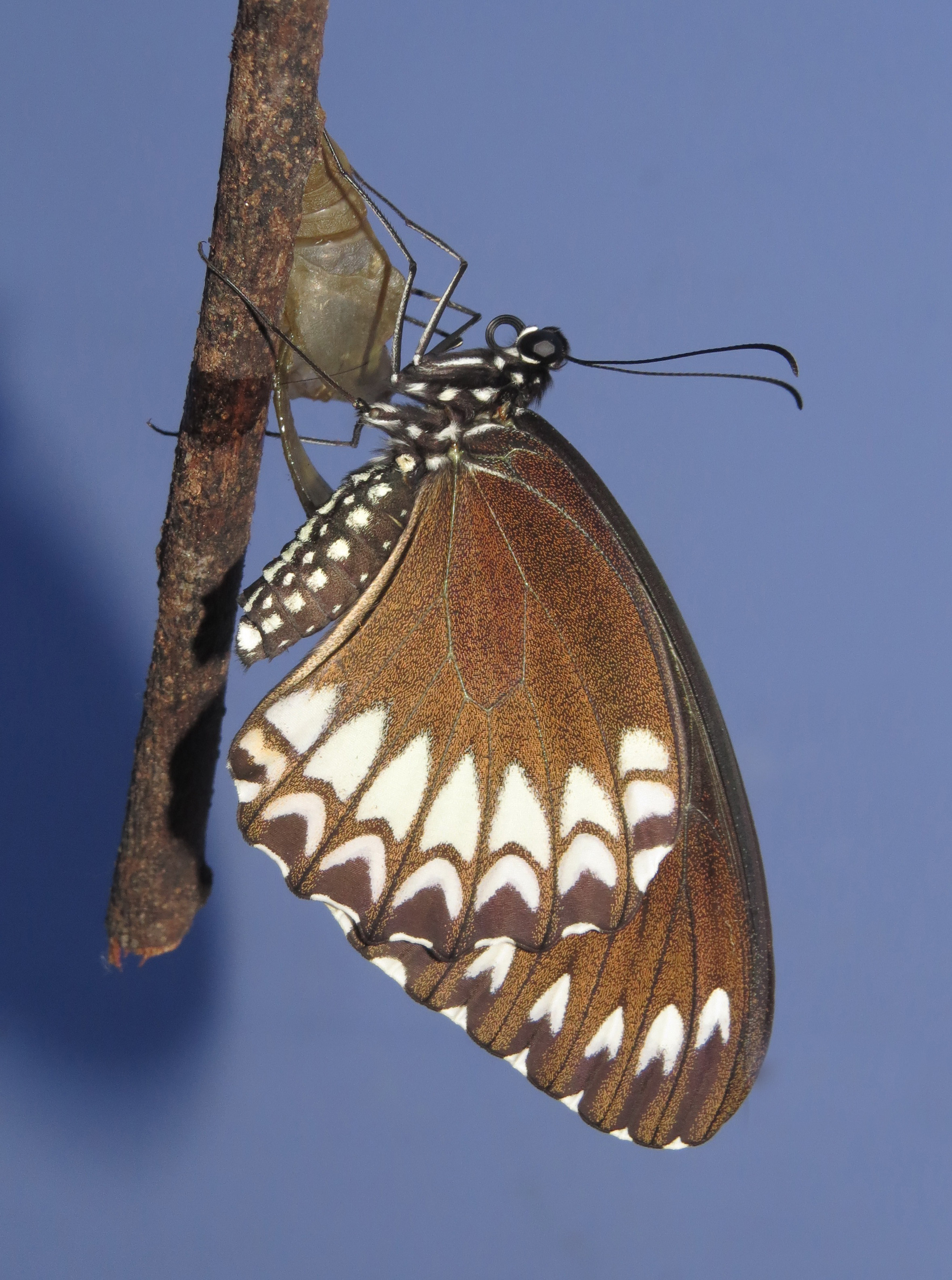
Ventral view

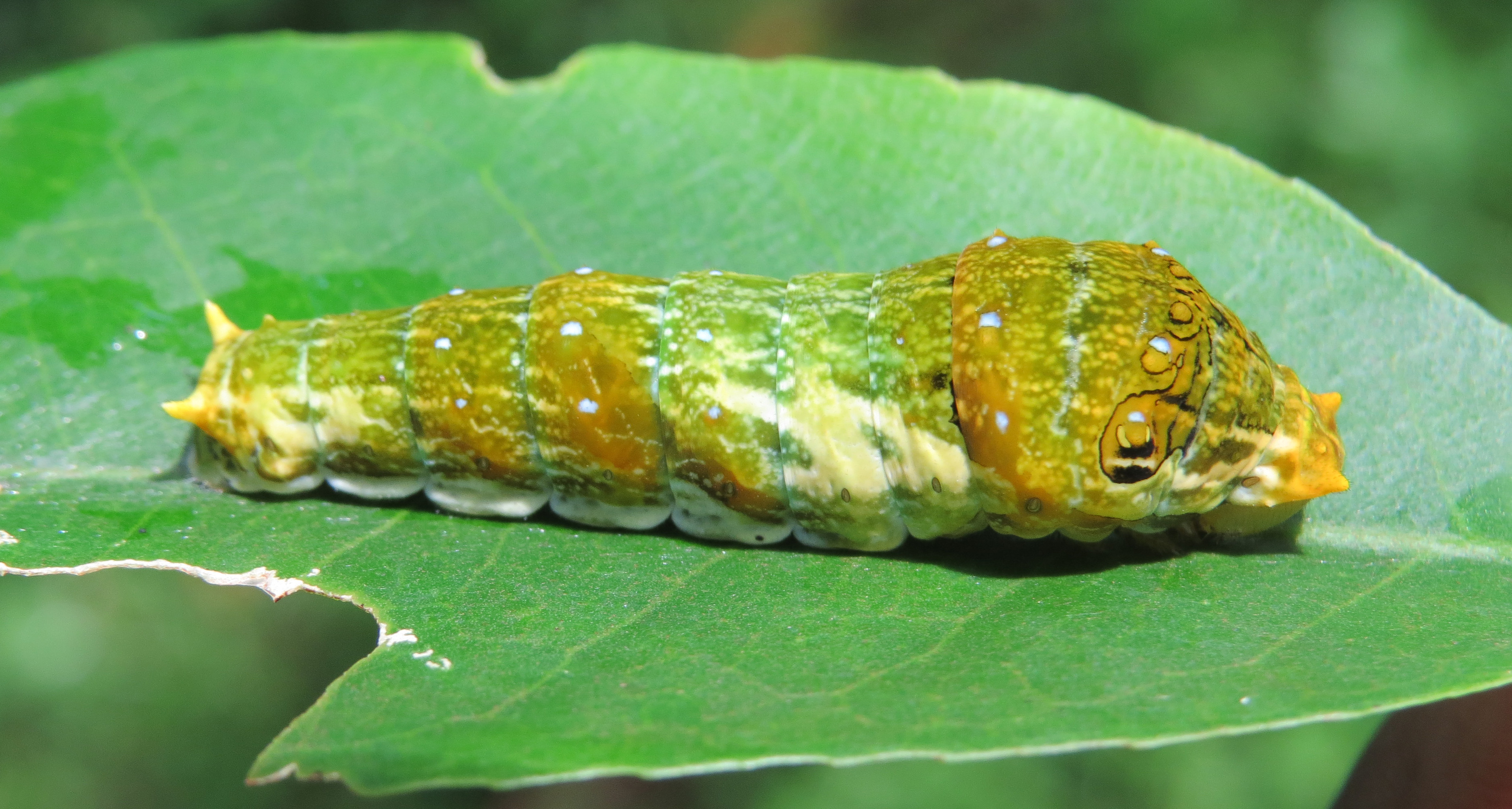
Larva

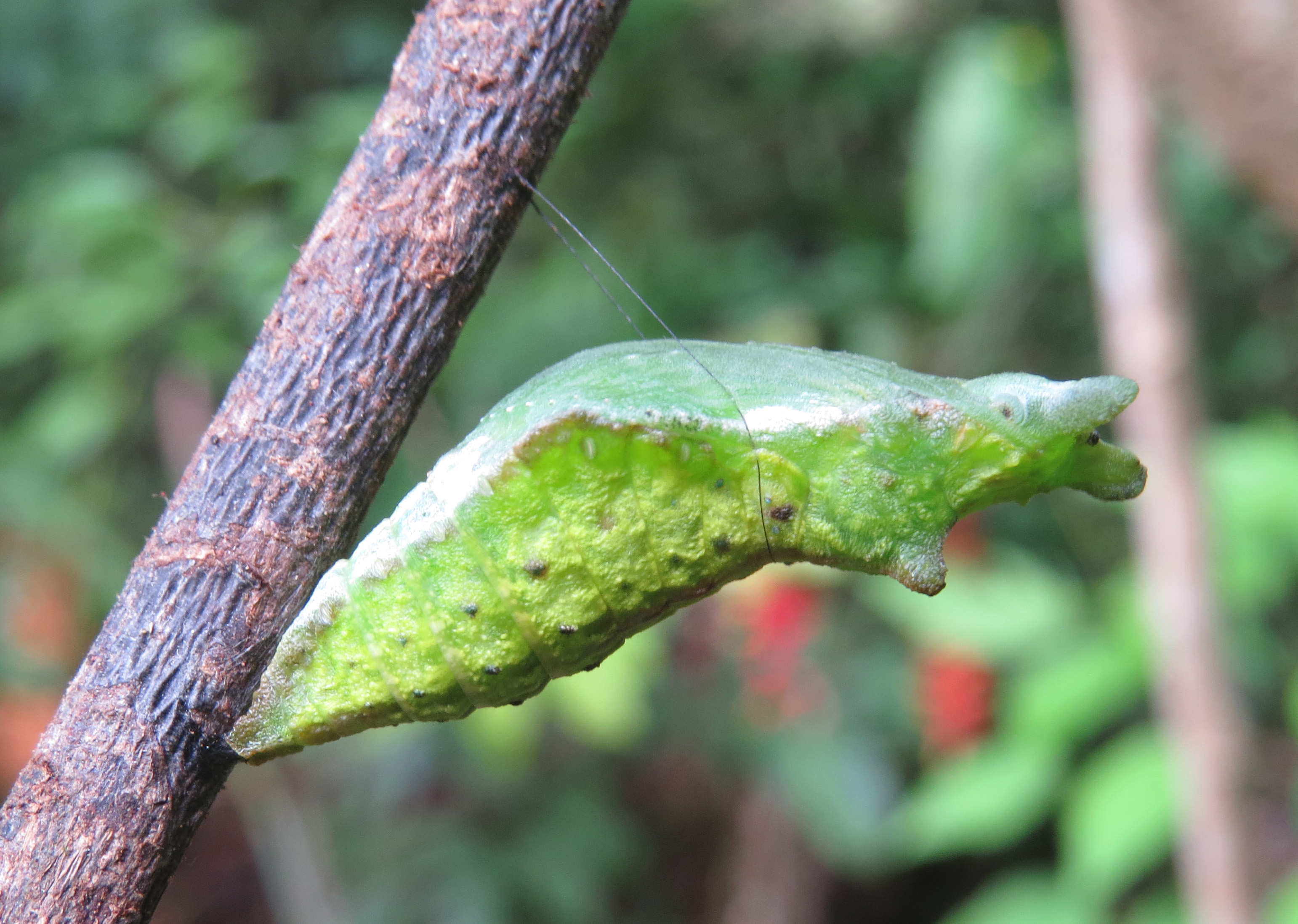
Pupa

===== Papilio helenus (red Helen) =====
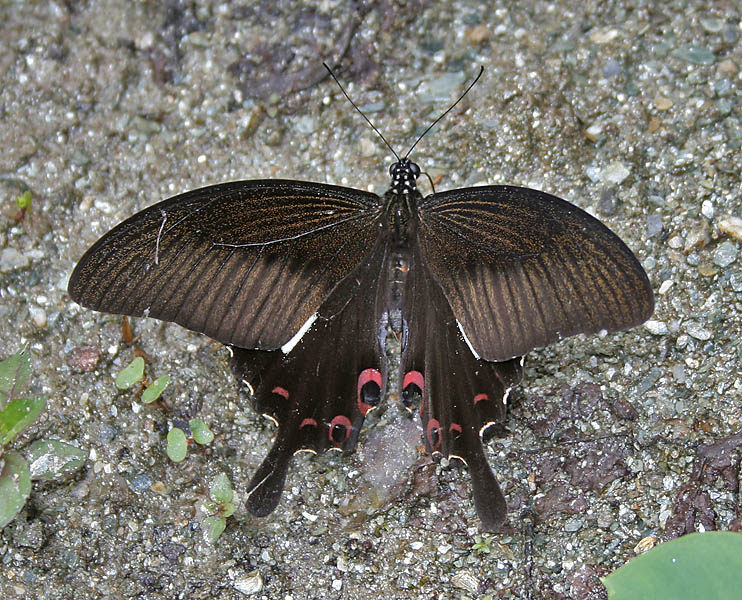
Dorsal view

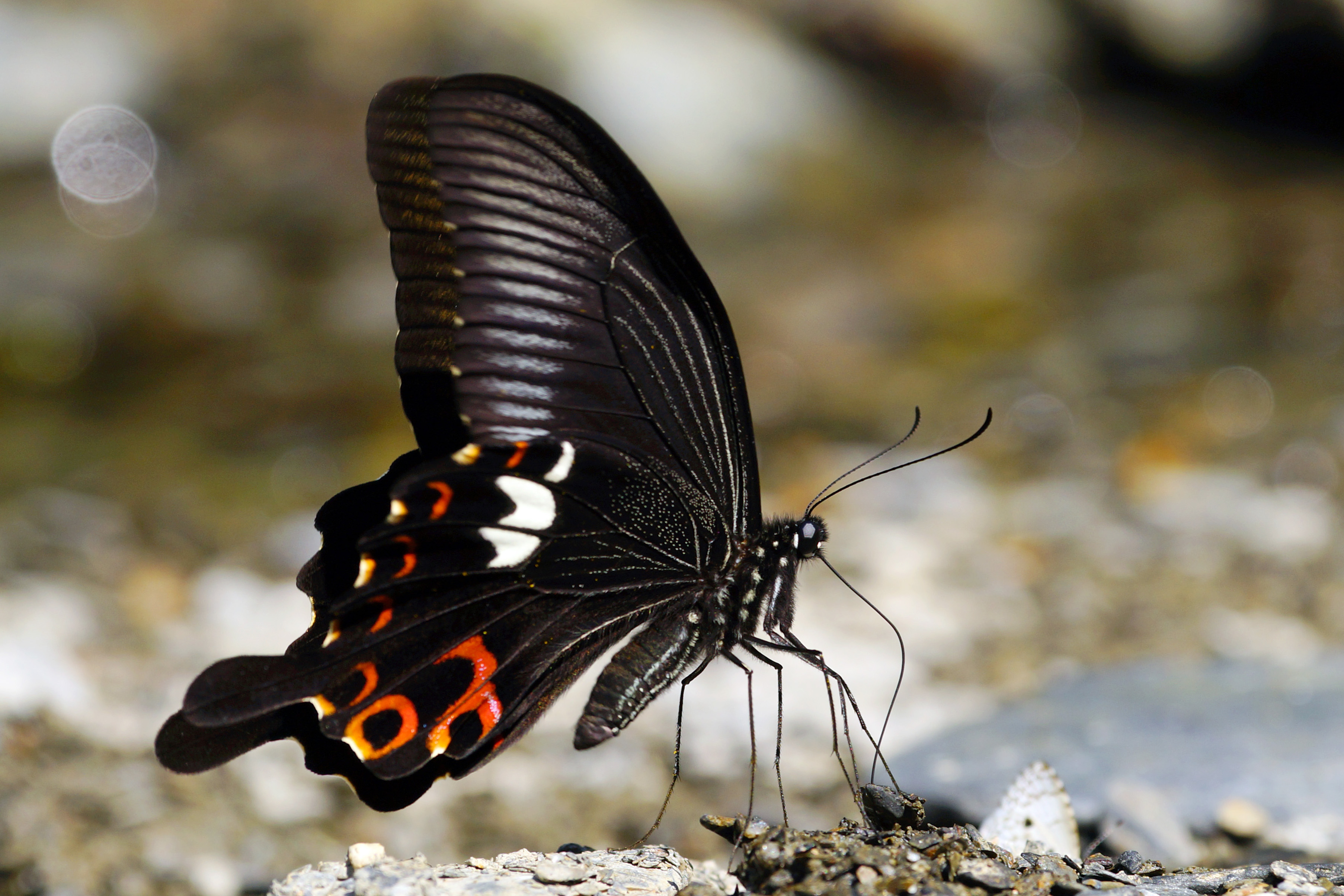
Ventral view

Egg

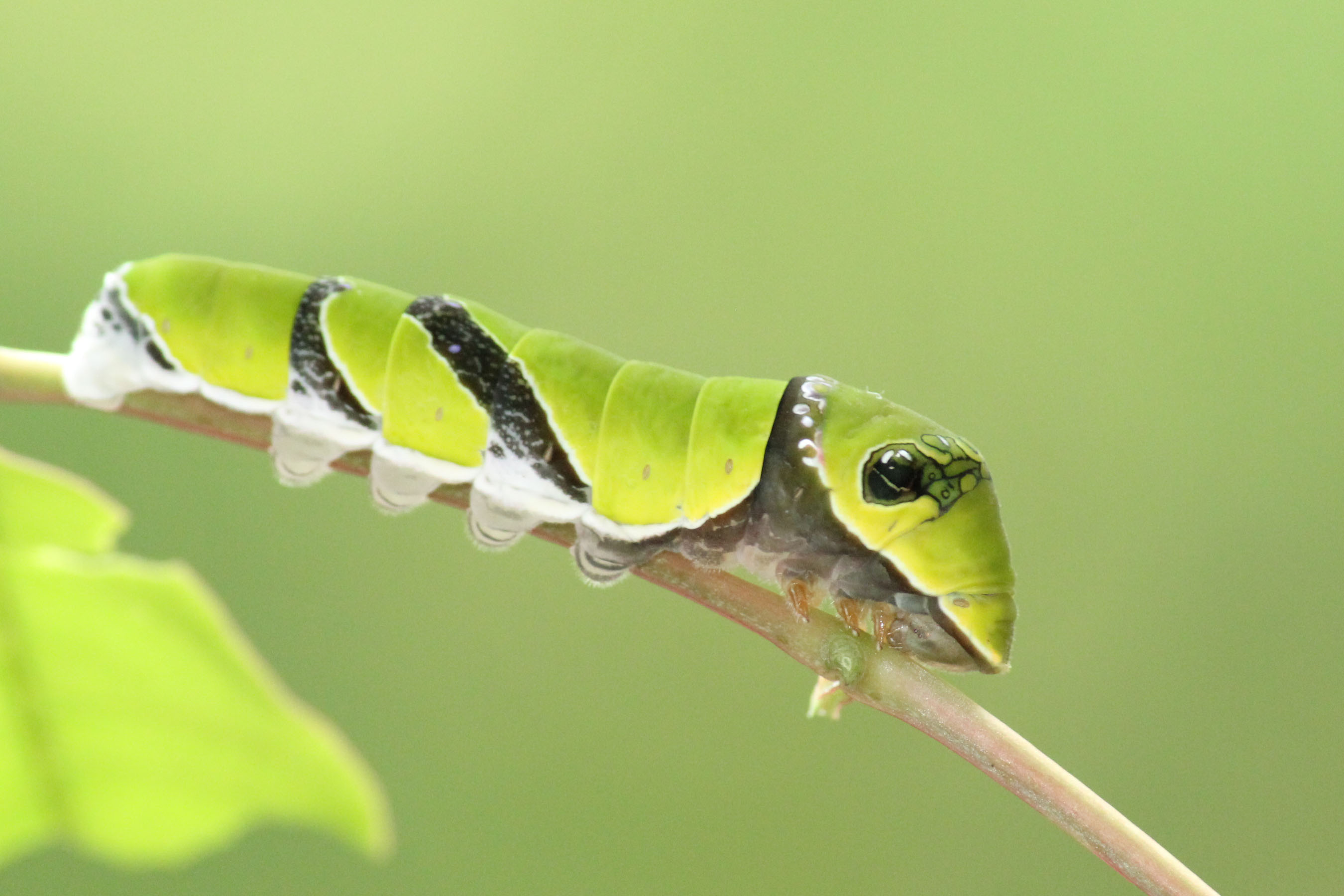
Larva

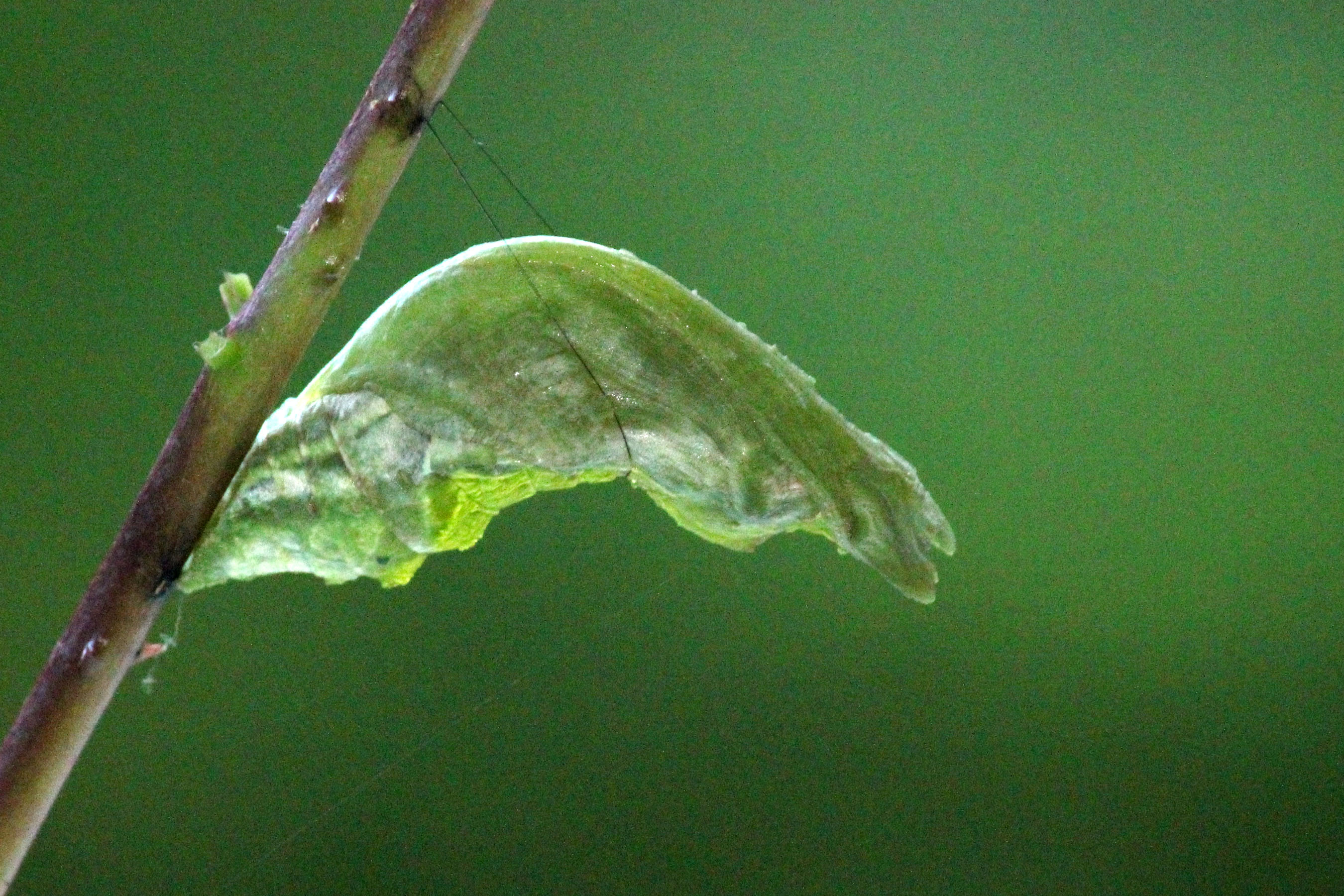
Pupa

===== Papilio liomedon (Malabar banded swallowtail) =====
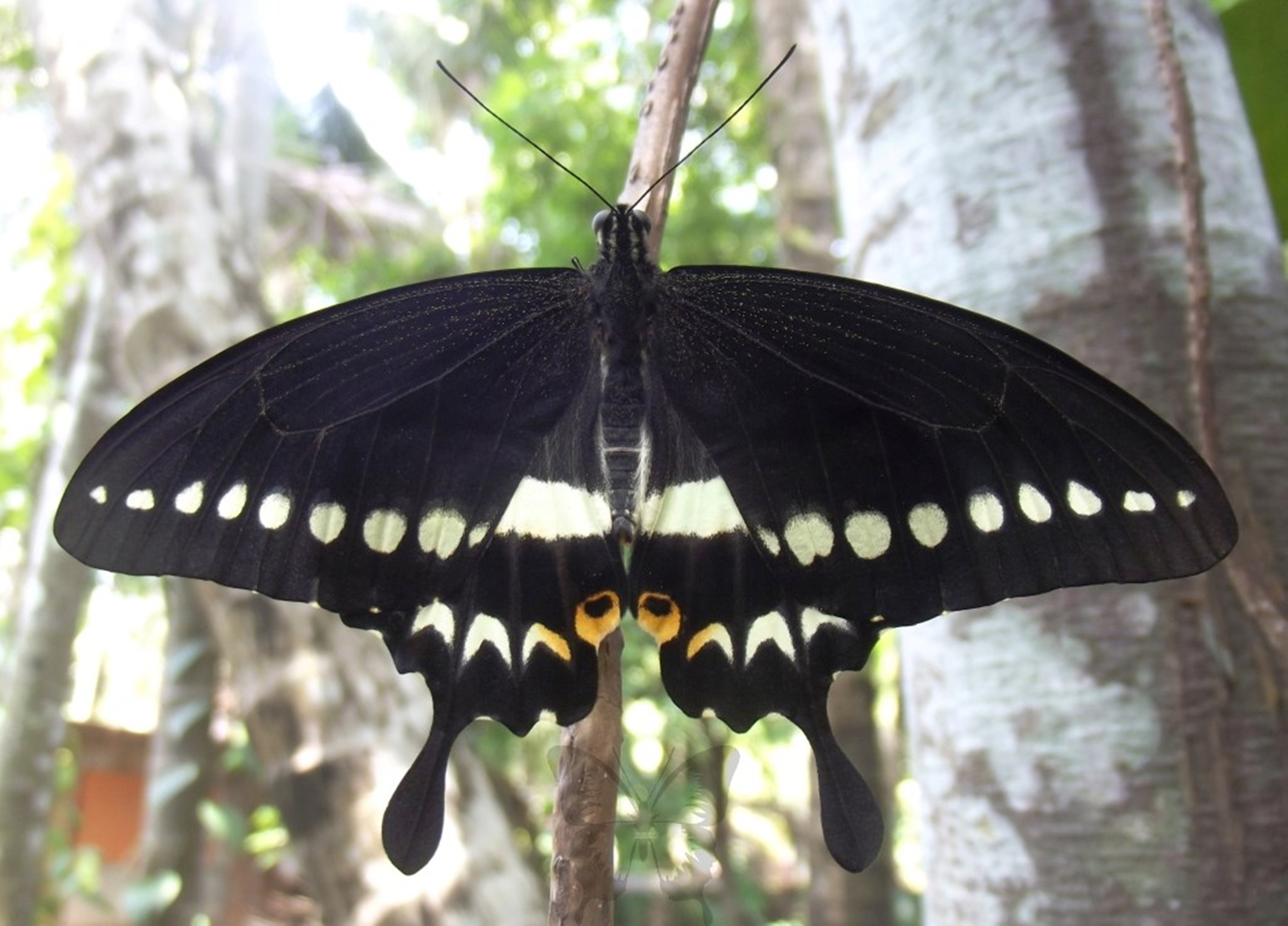
Dorsal view

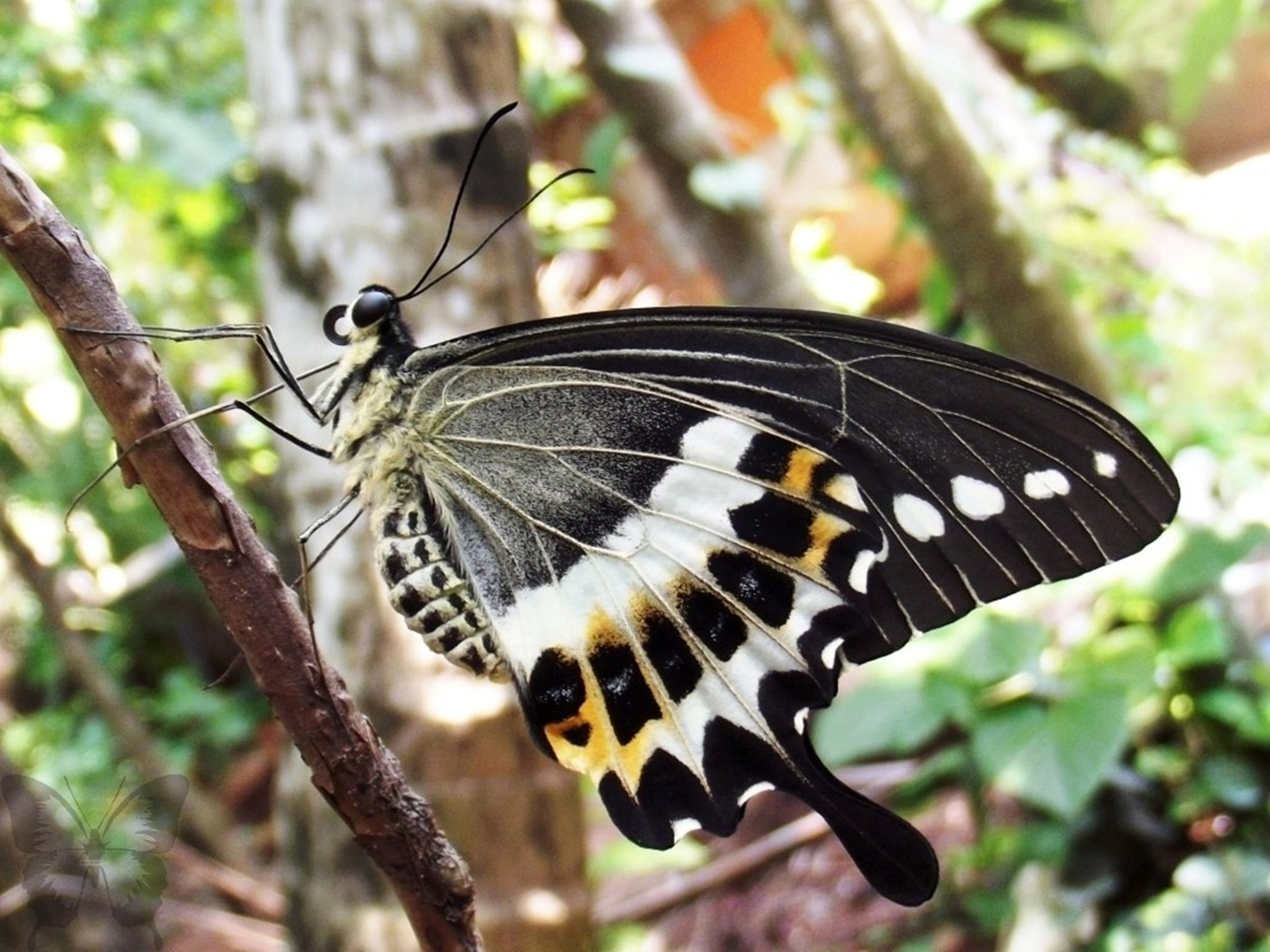
Ventral view

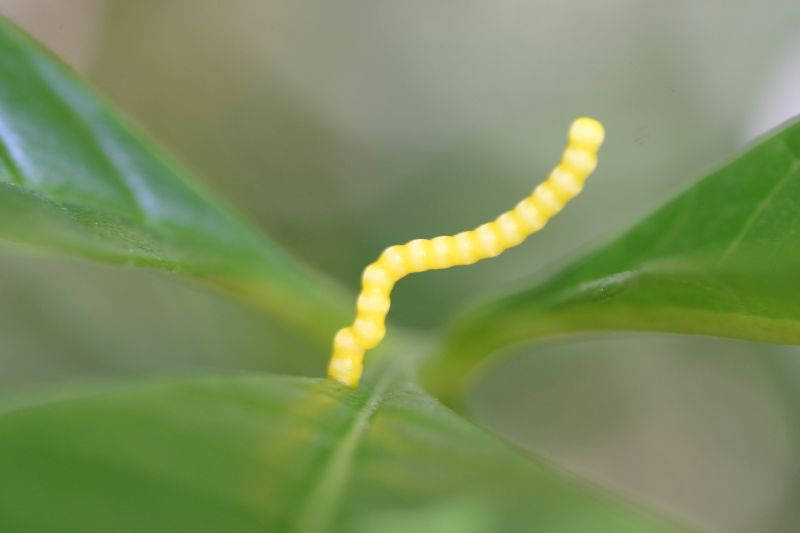
Eggs

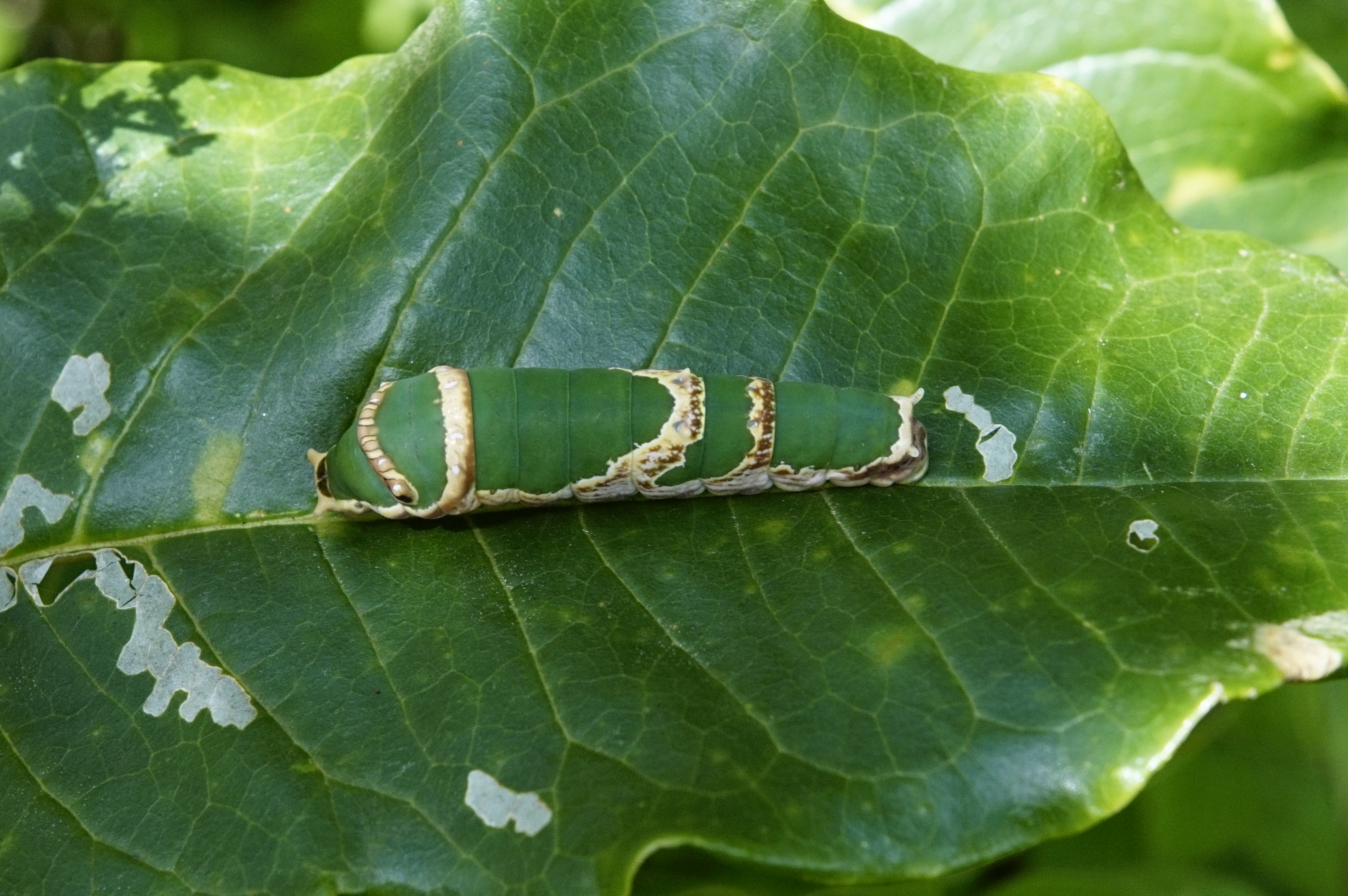
Larva

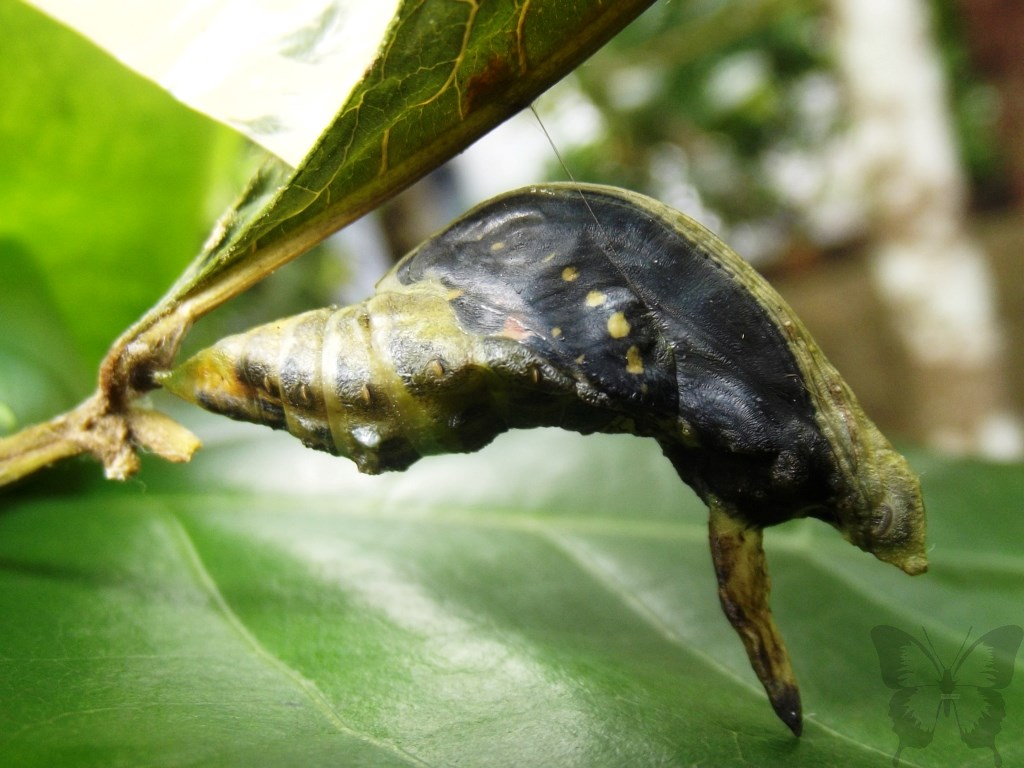
Pupa

===== Papilio paris (Paris peacock) =====
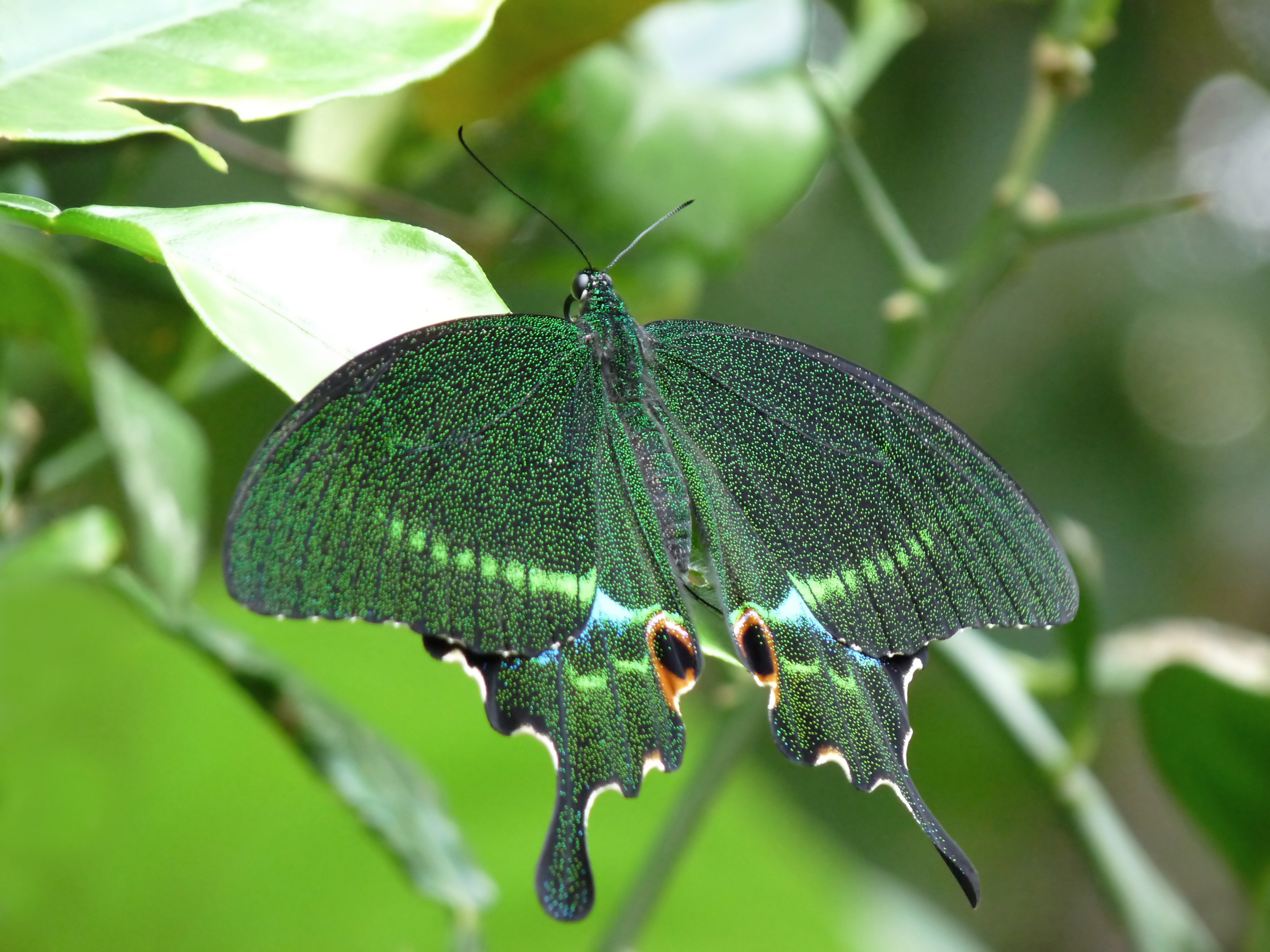
Dorsal view

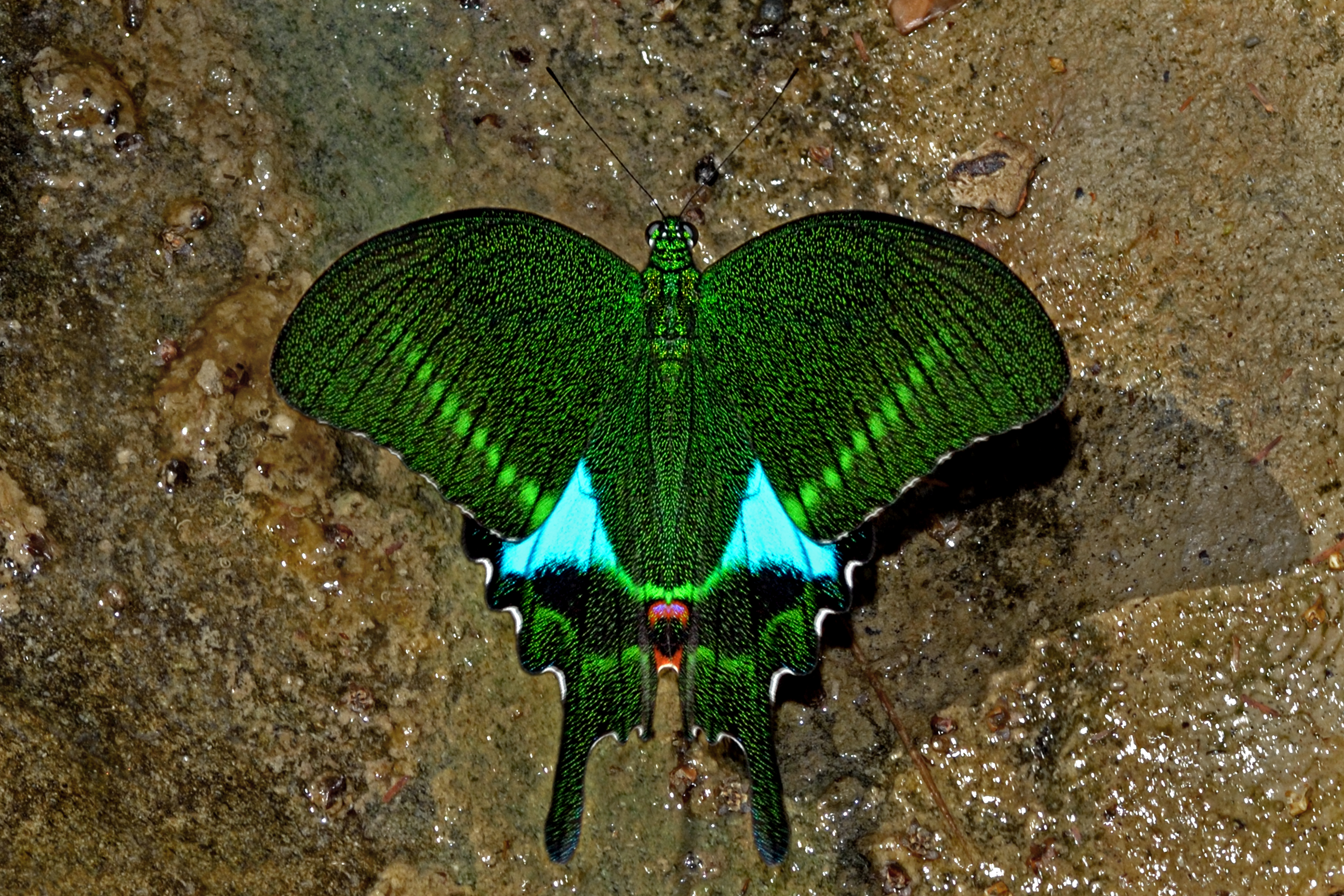
Dorsal view

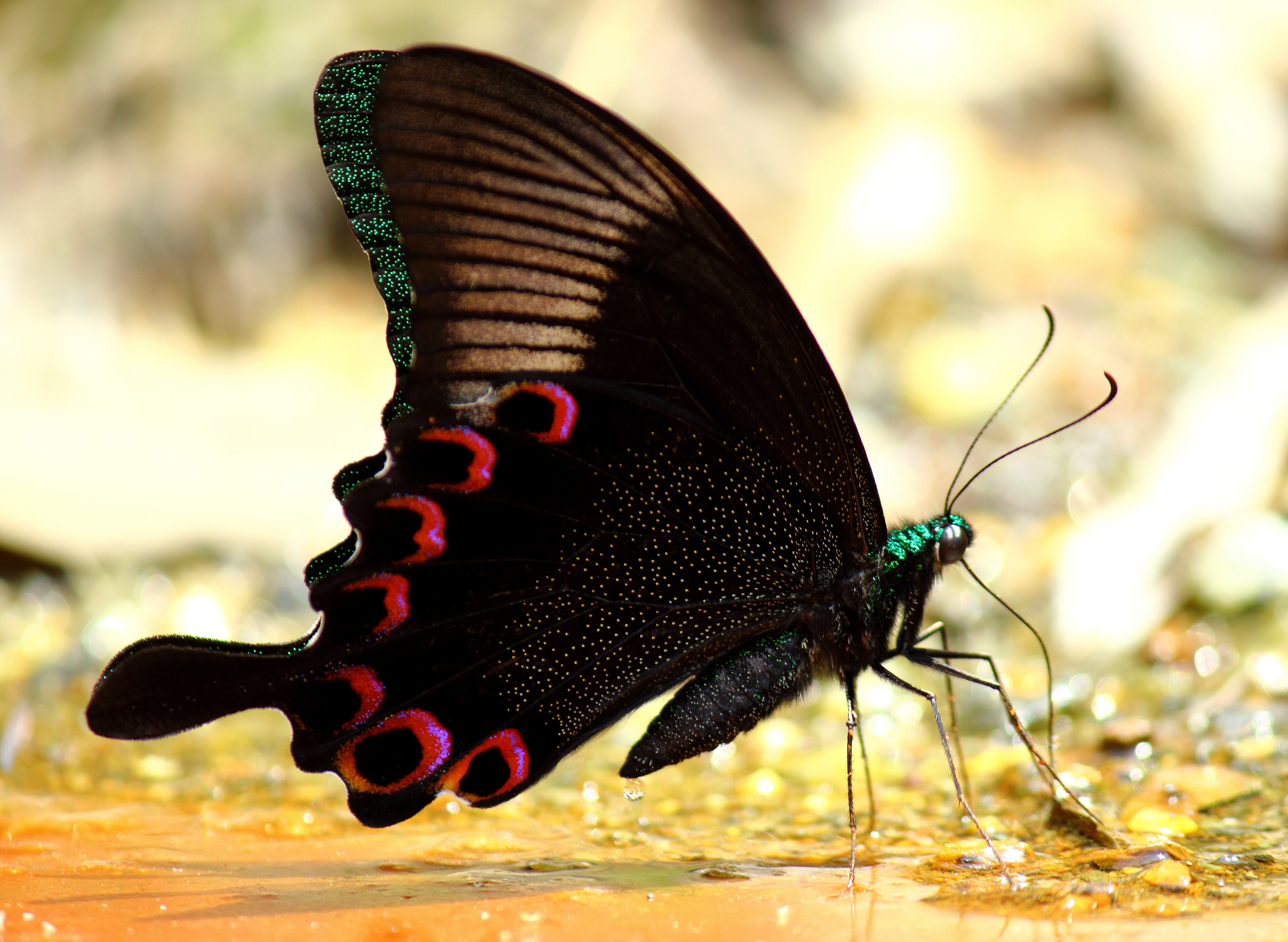
Ventral view

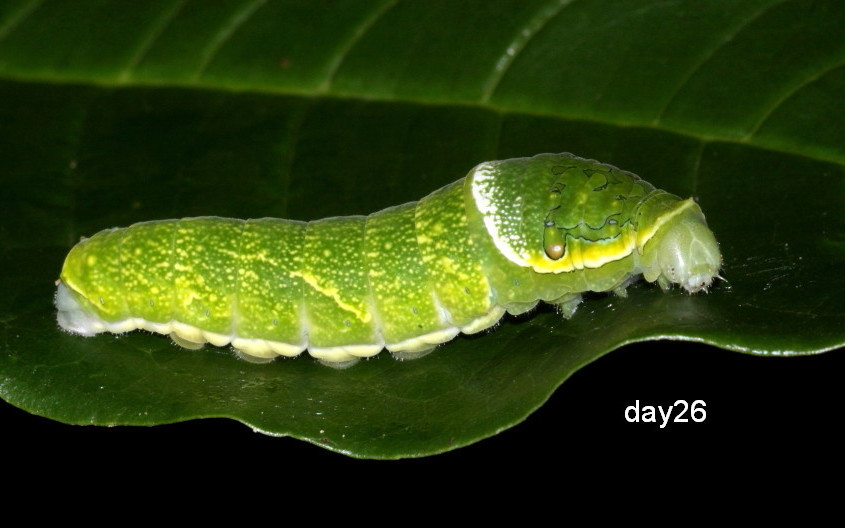
Larva

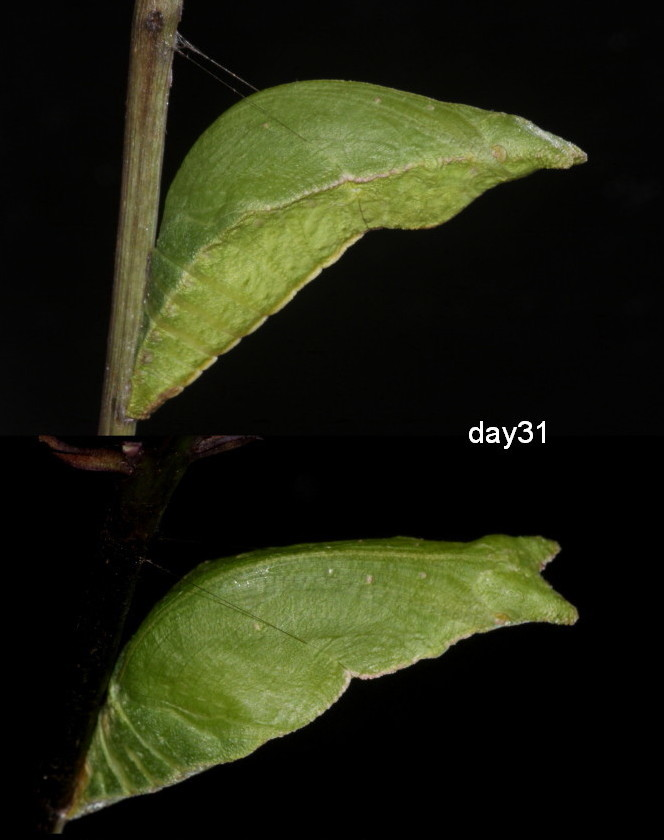
Pupa

===== Papilio polymnestor (blue Mormon) =====
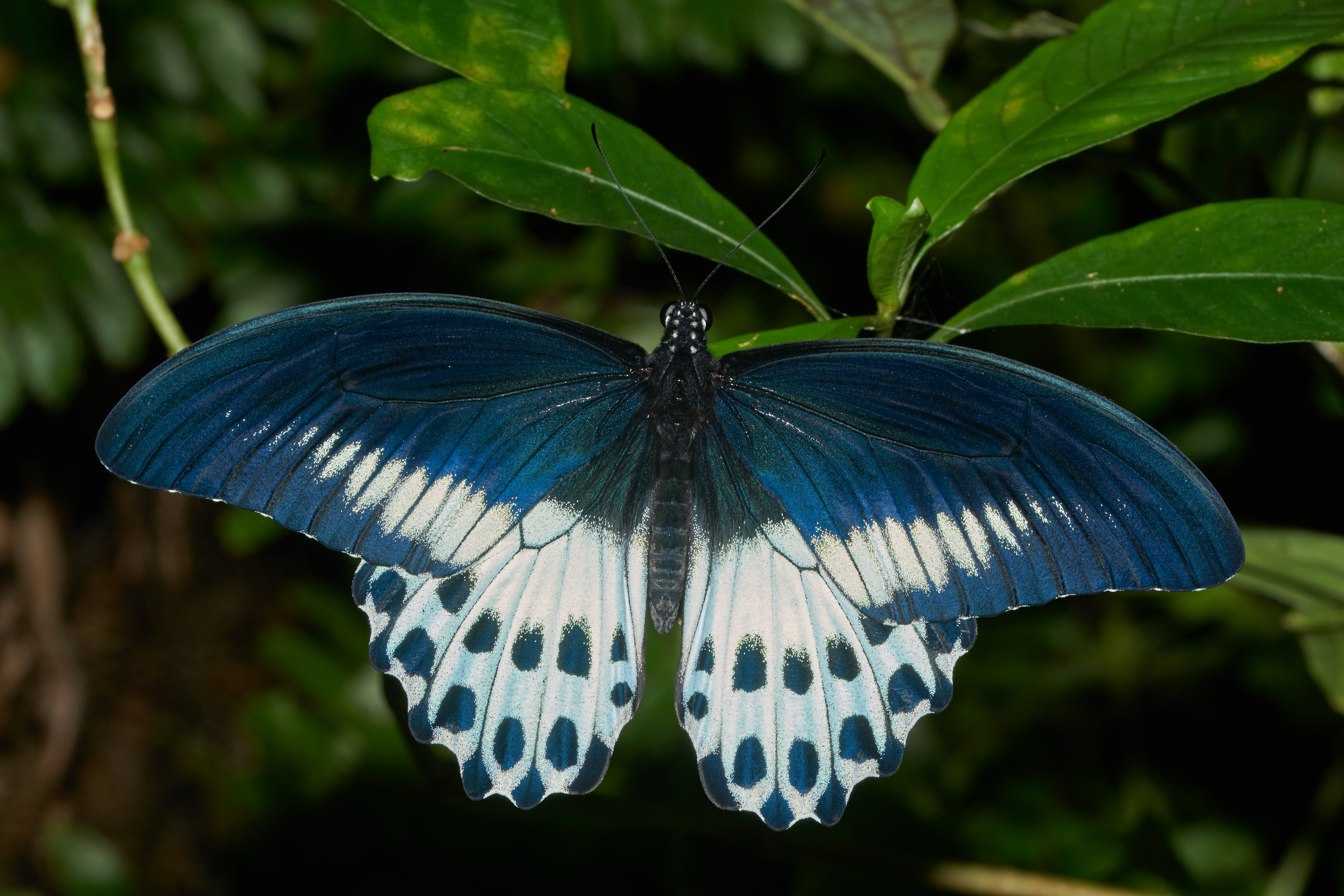
Dorsal view

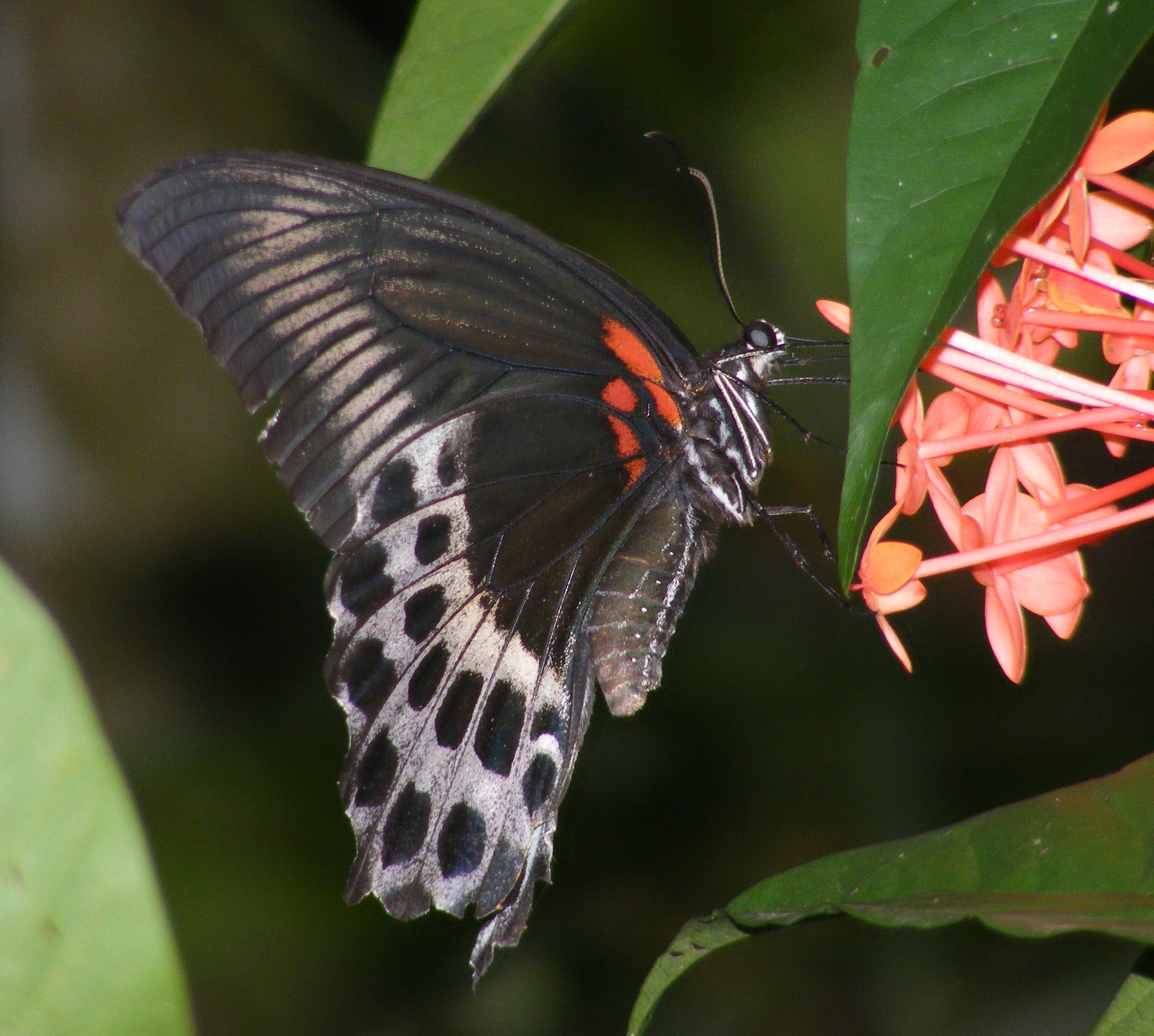
Ventral view

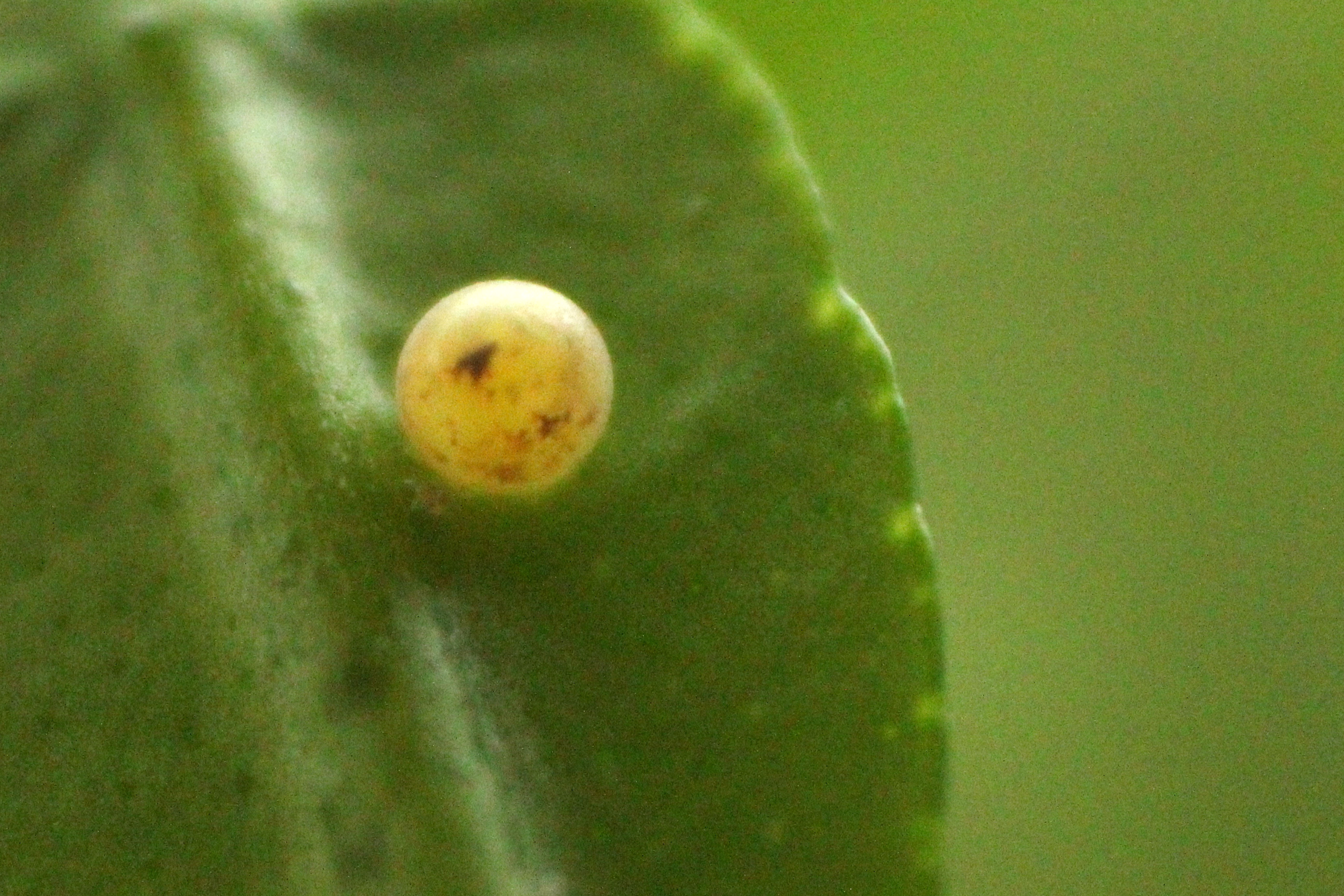
Egg

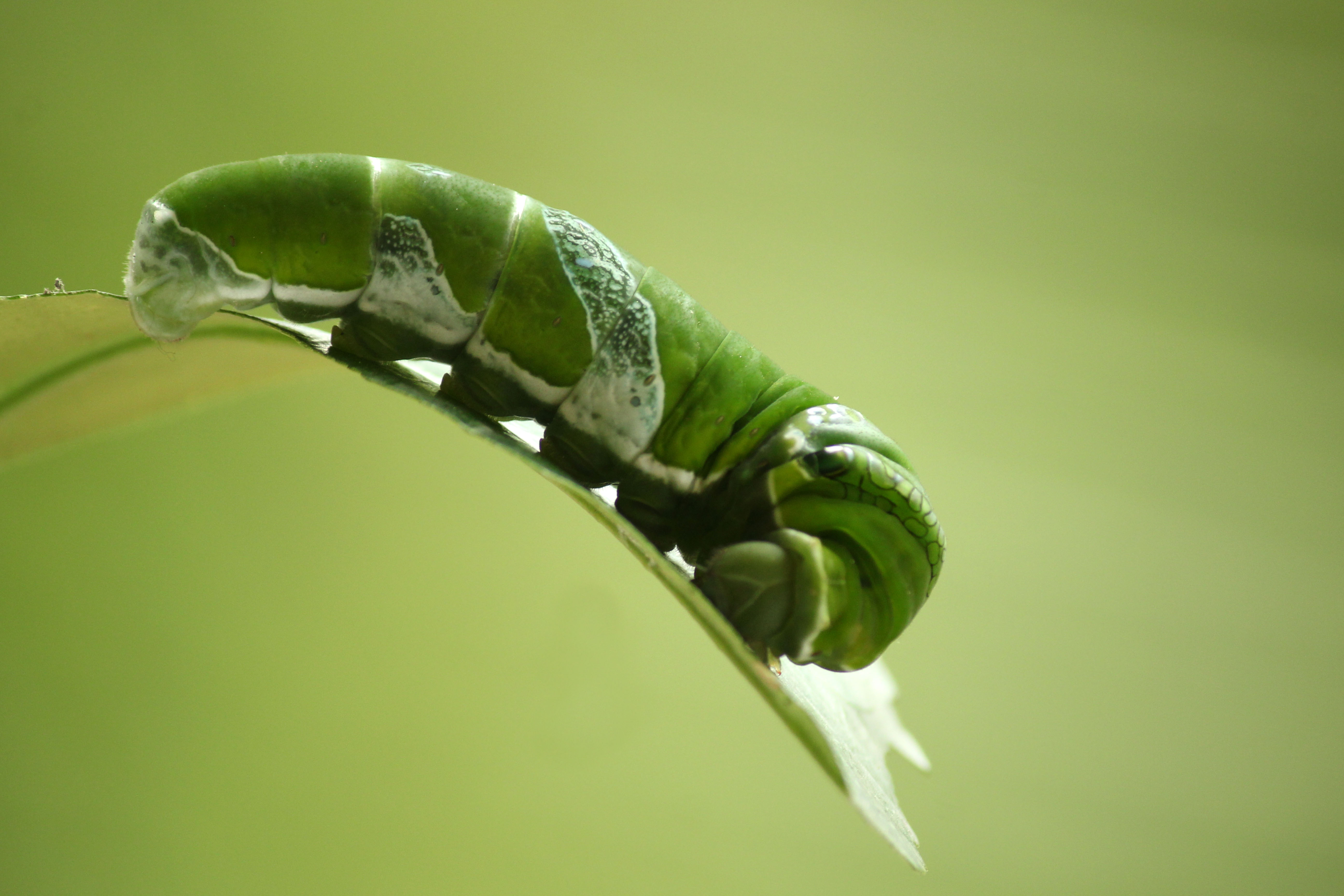
Larva

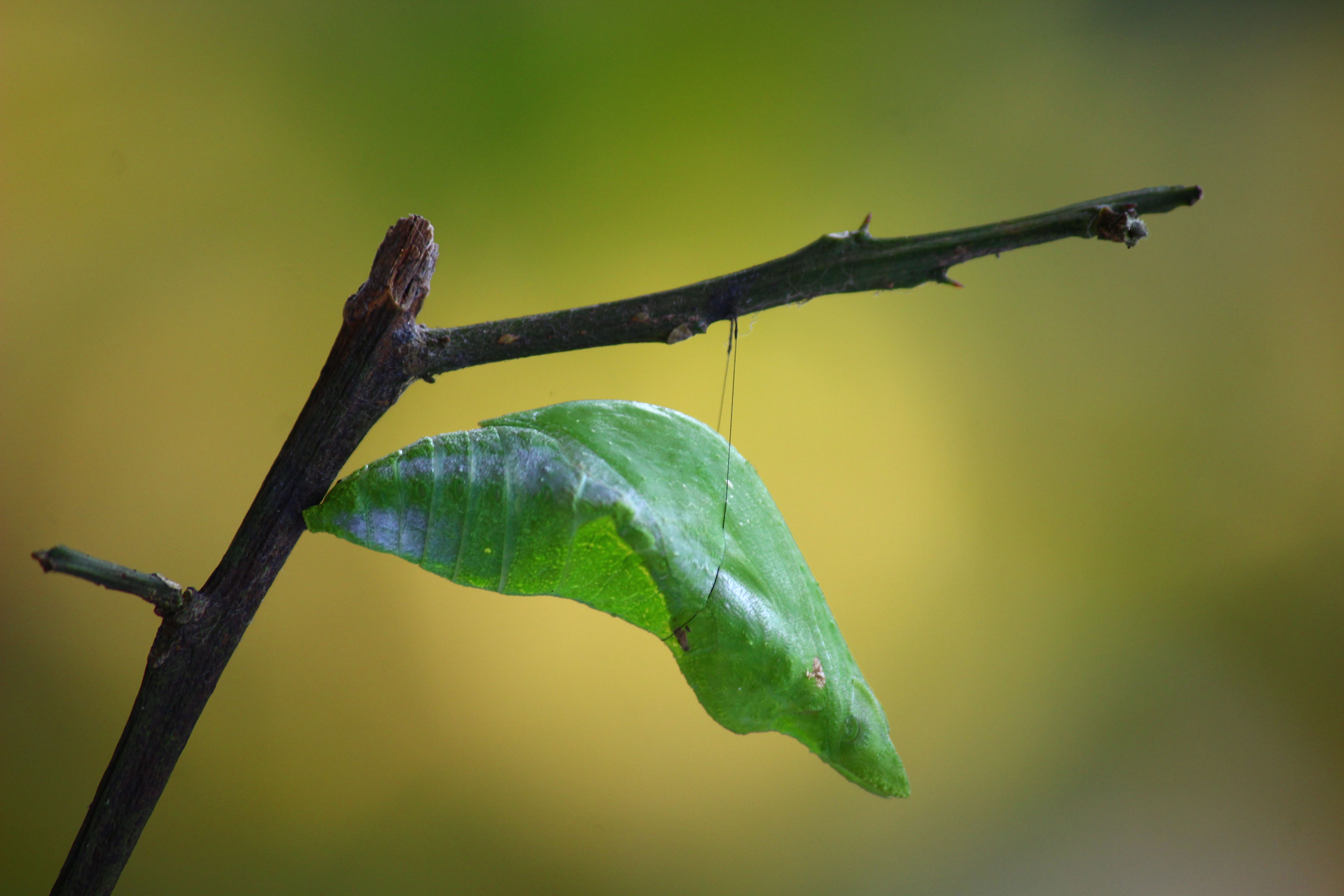
Pupa

===== Papilio polytes (common Mormon) =====
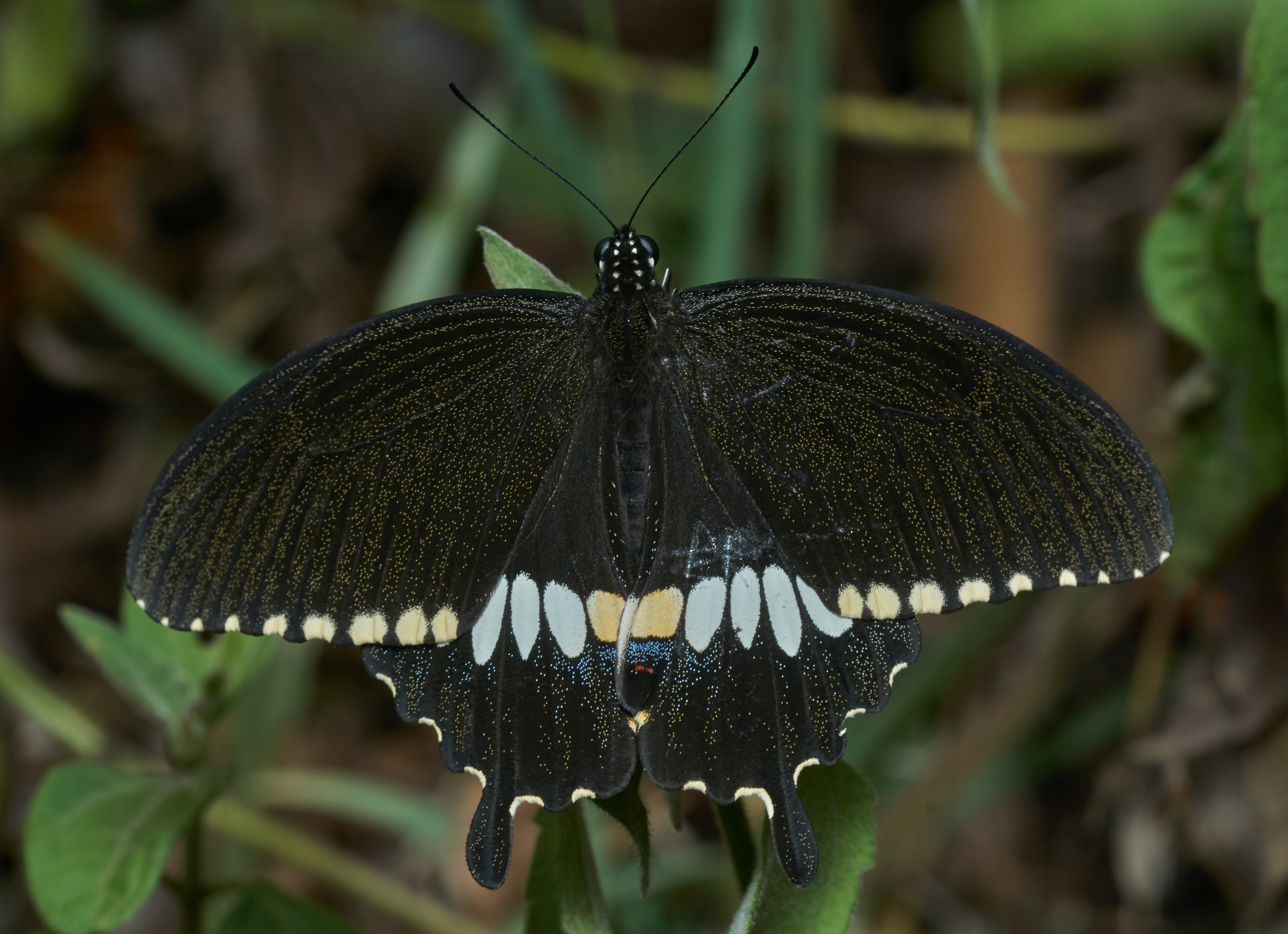
Dorsal view (male)

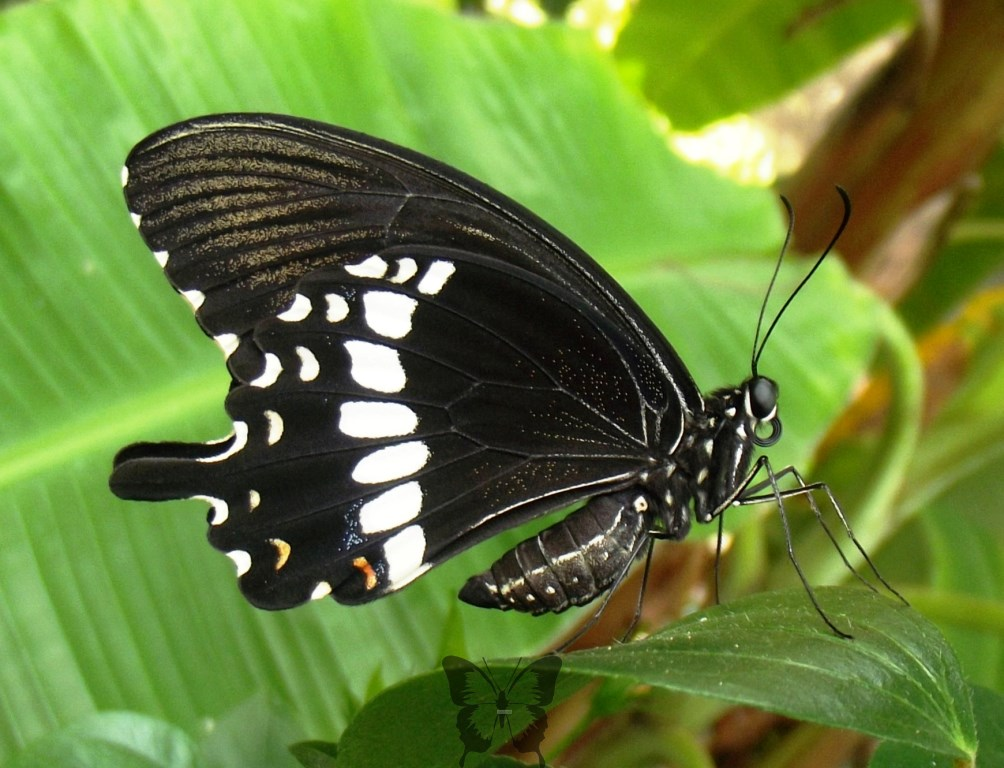
Ventral view (male)

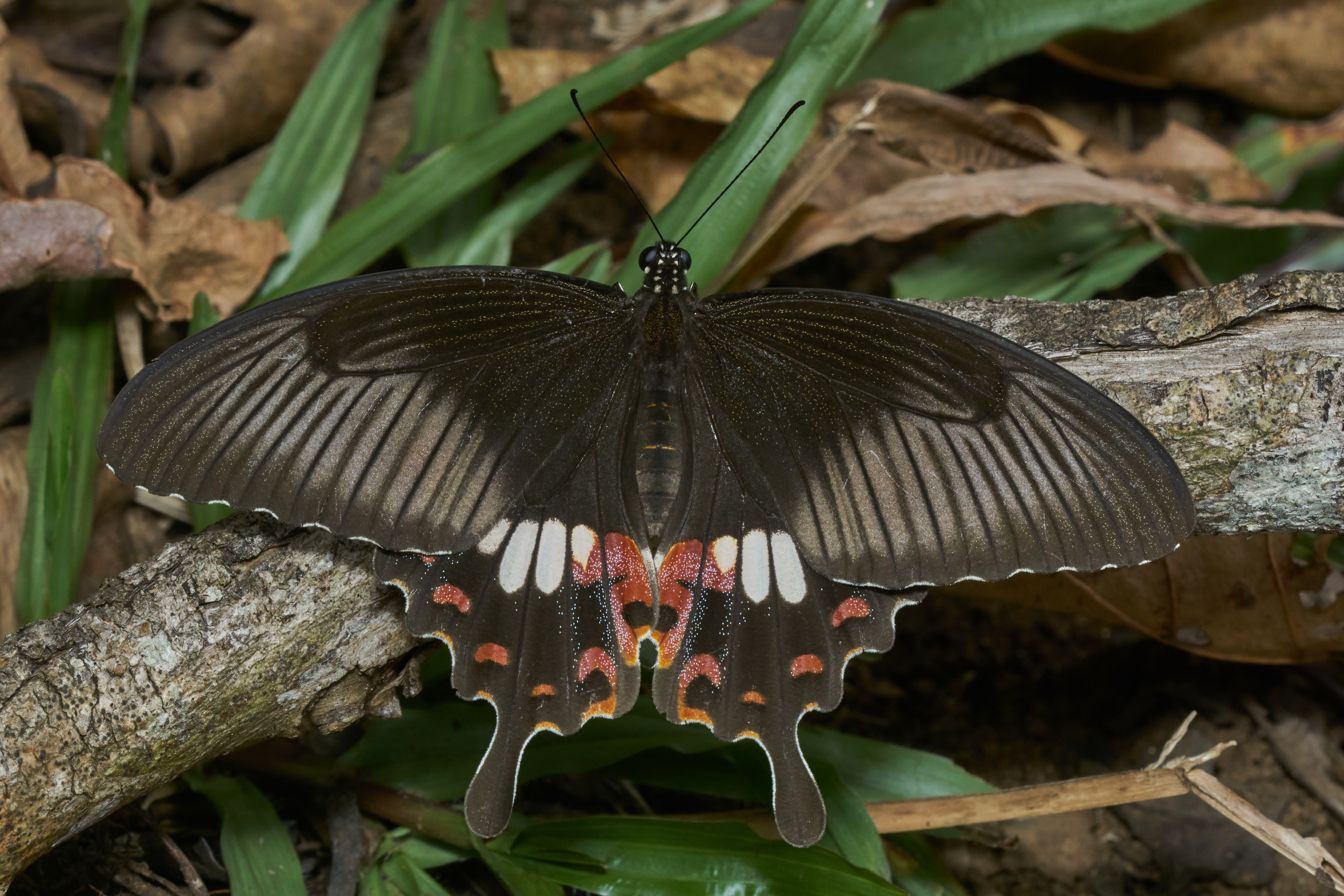
Dorsal view (female, form stichius)

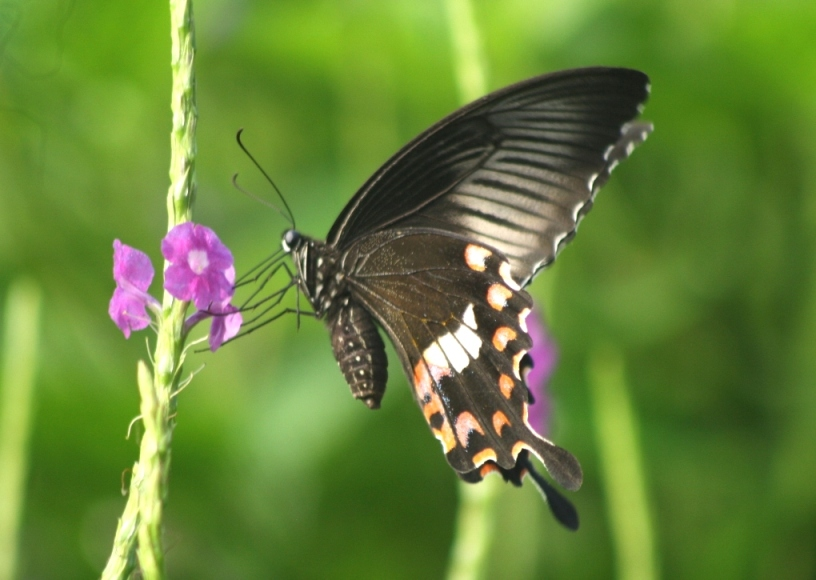
Ventral view (female, form stichius)

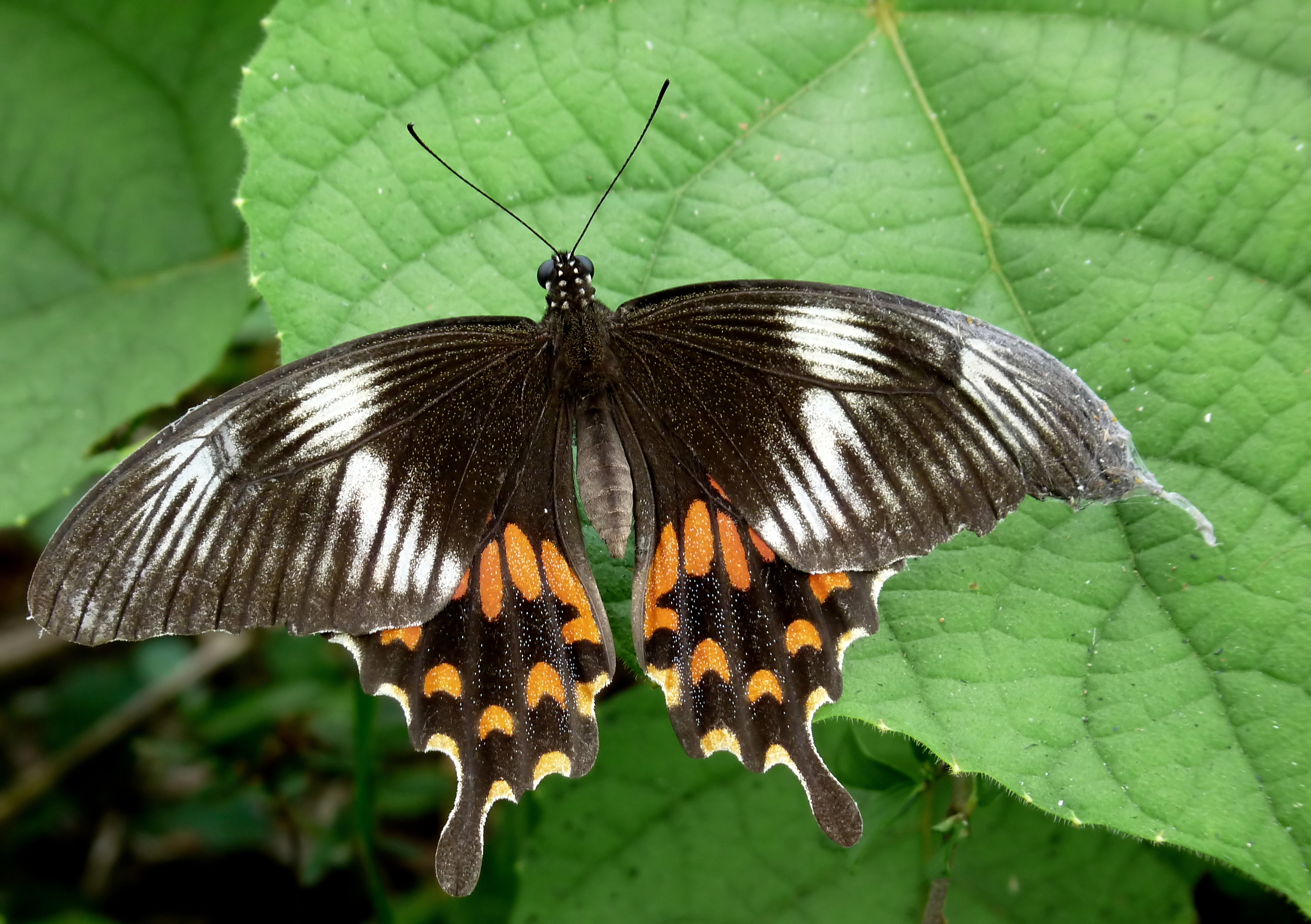
Dorsal view (female, form romulus)

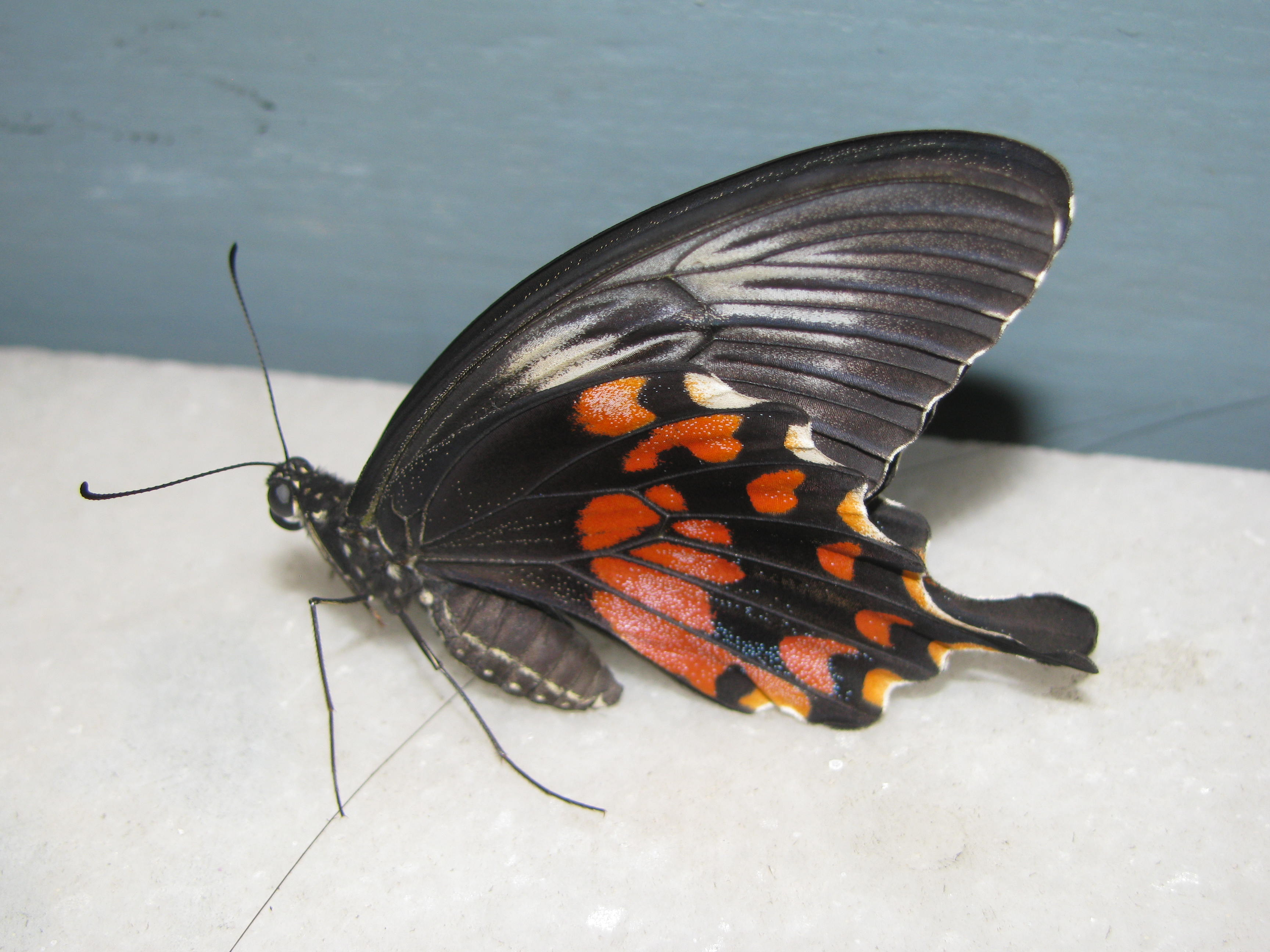
Ventral view (female, form romulus)

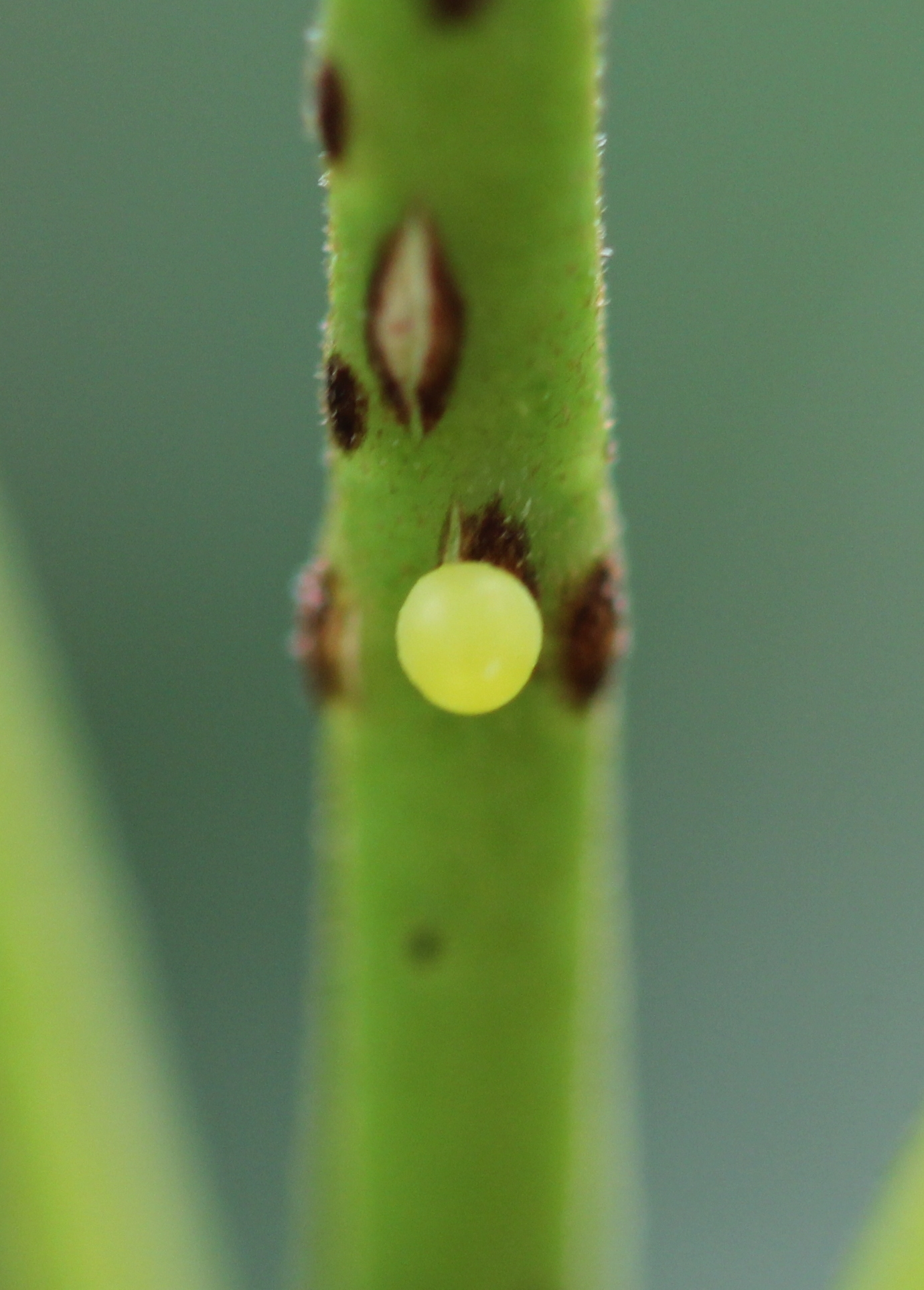
Egg

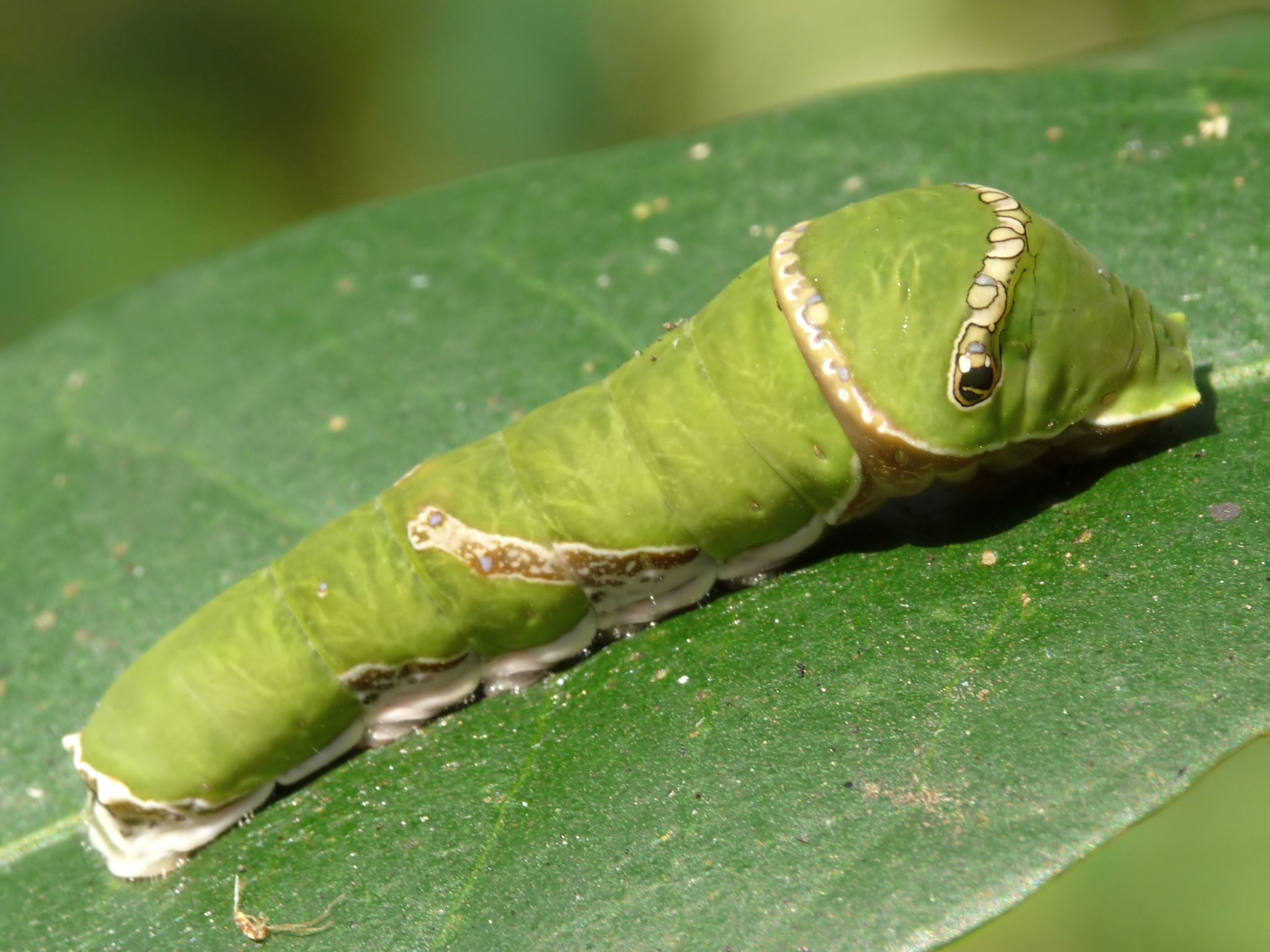
Larva

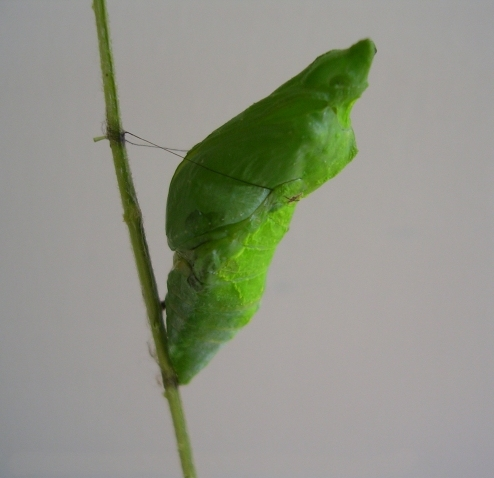
Pupa

==== Genus: Troides (birdwings) ====
===== Troides minos (southern birdwing) =====
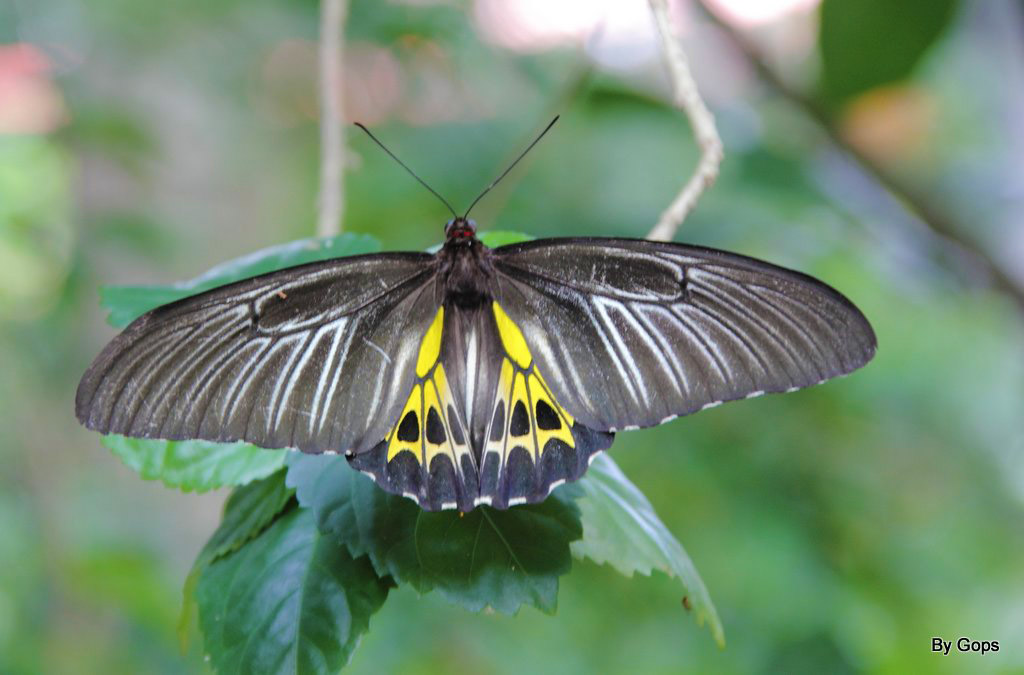
Dorsal view

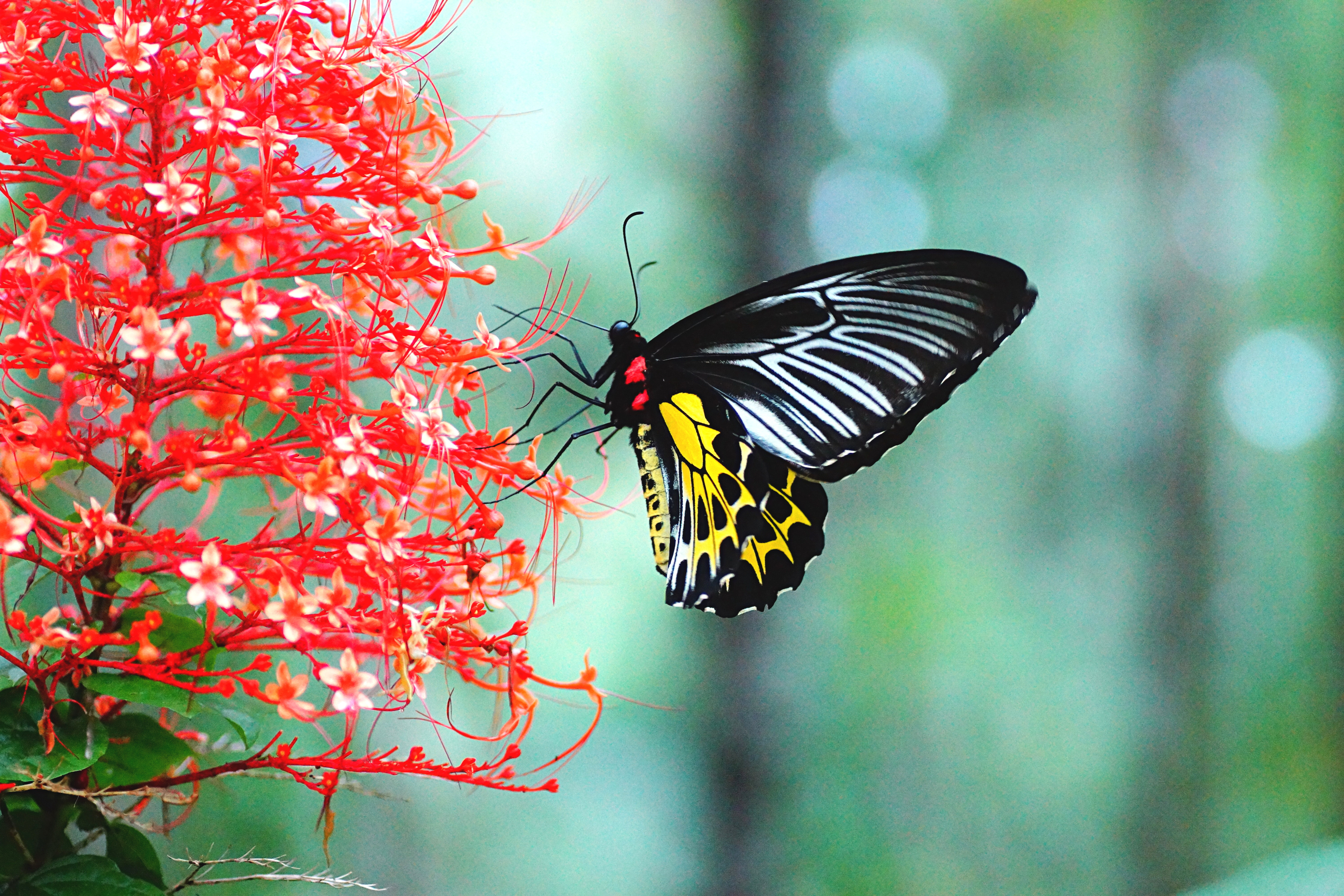
Ventral view

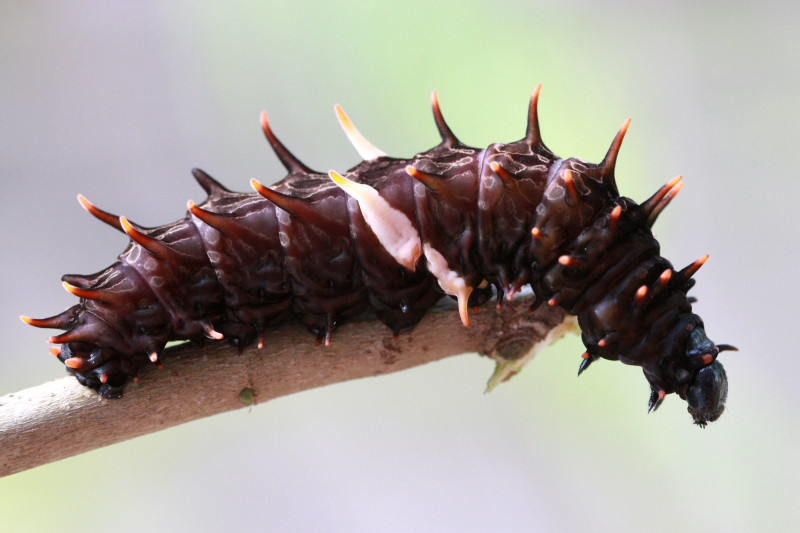
Larva

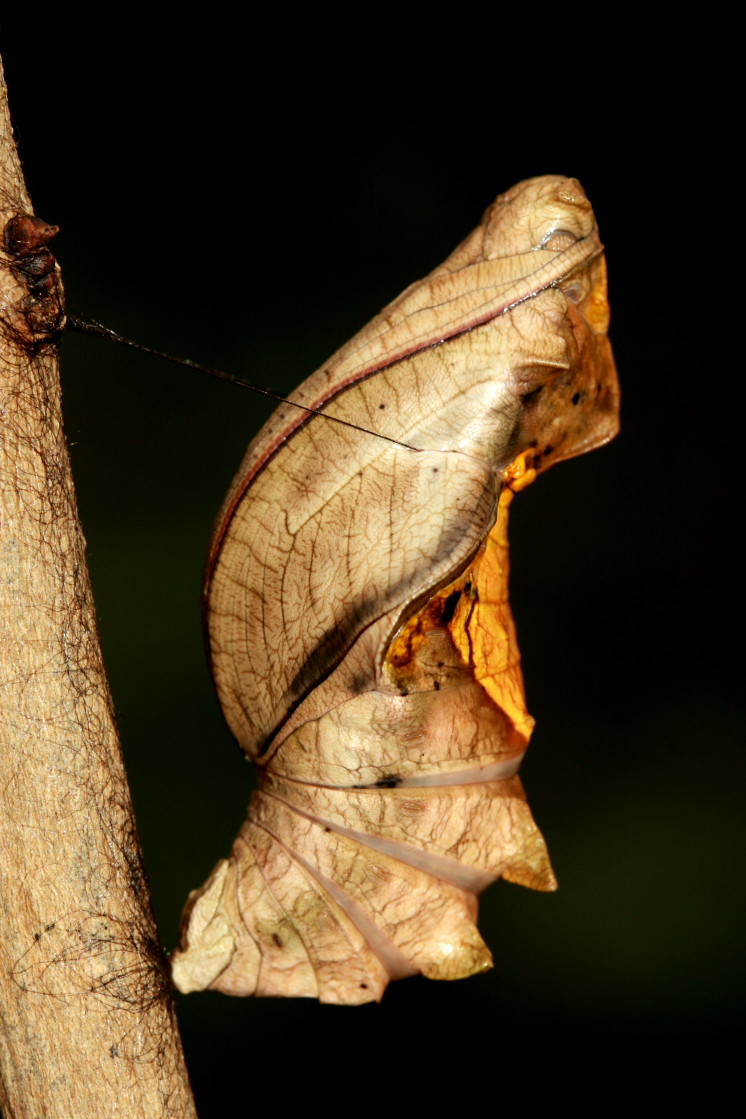
Pupa

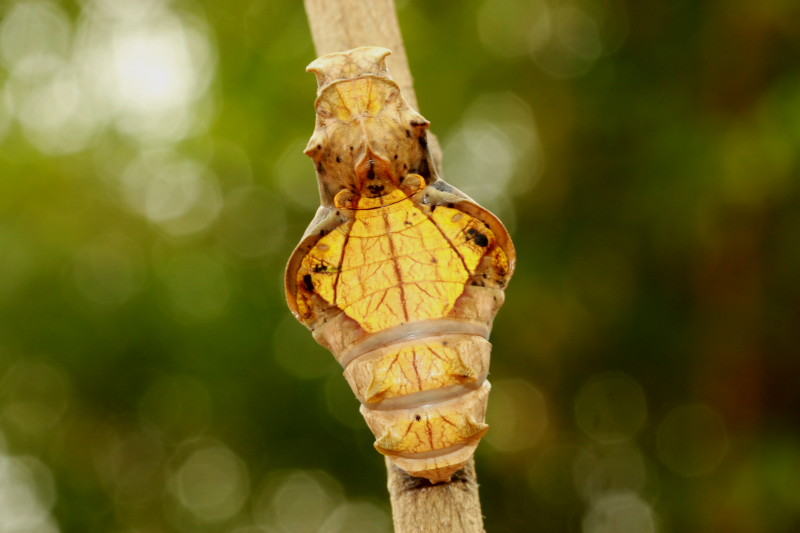
Pupa

== Family: Pieridae ==
=== Subfamily: Coliadinae (yellows) ===
==== Genus: Catopsilia (emigrants) ====
===== Catopsilia pomona (common emigrant) =====
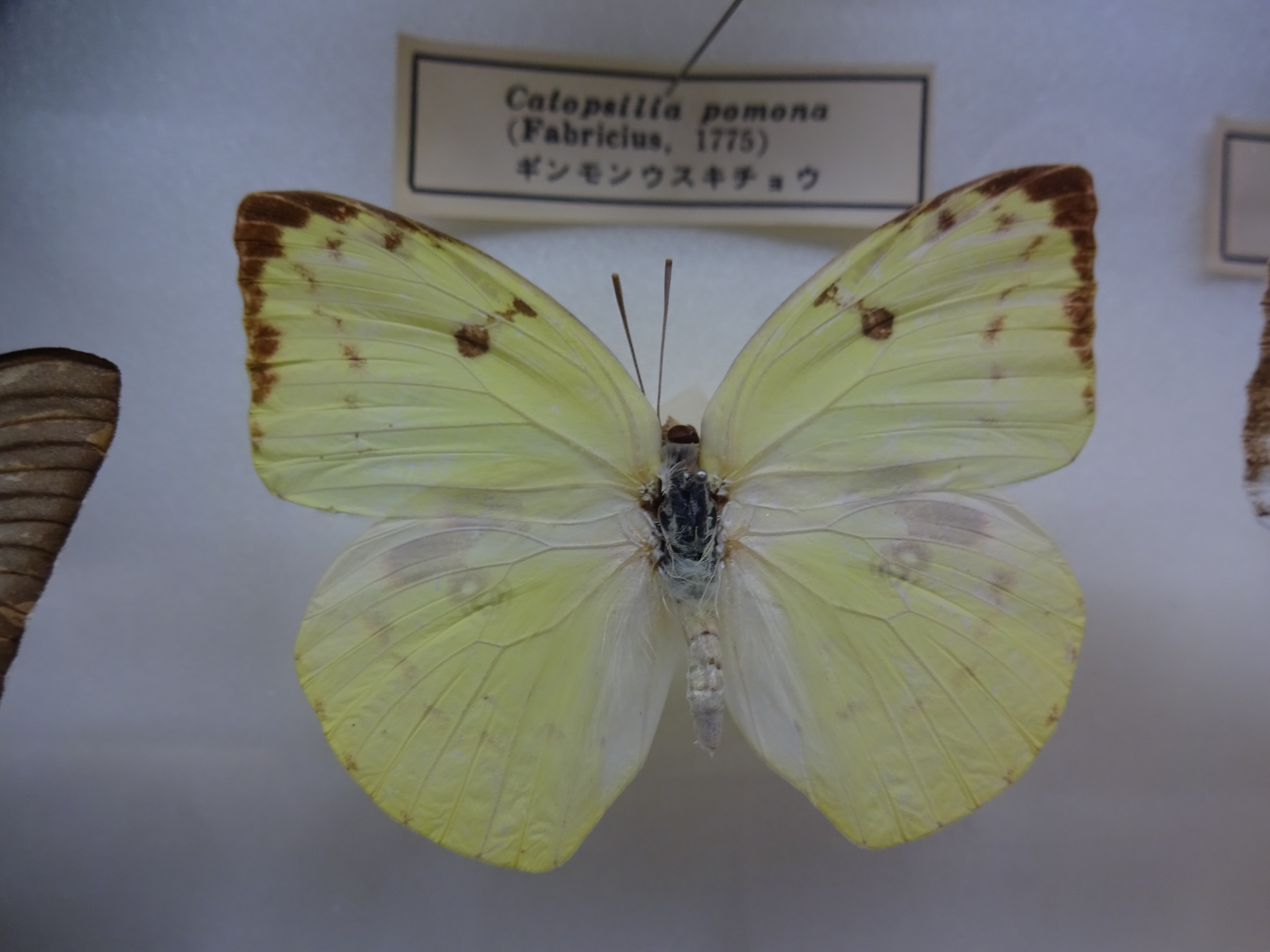
Dorsal view

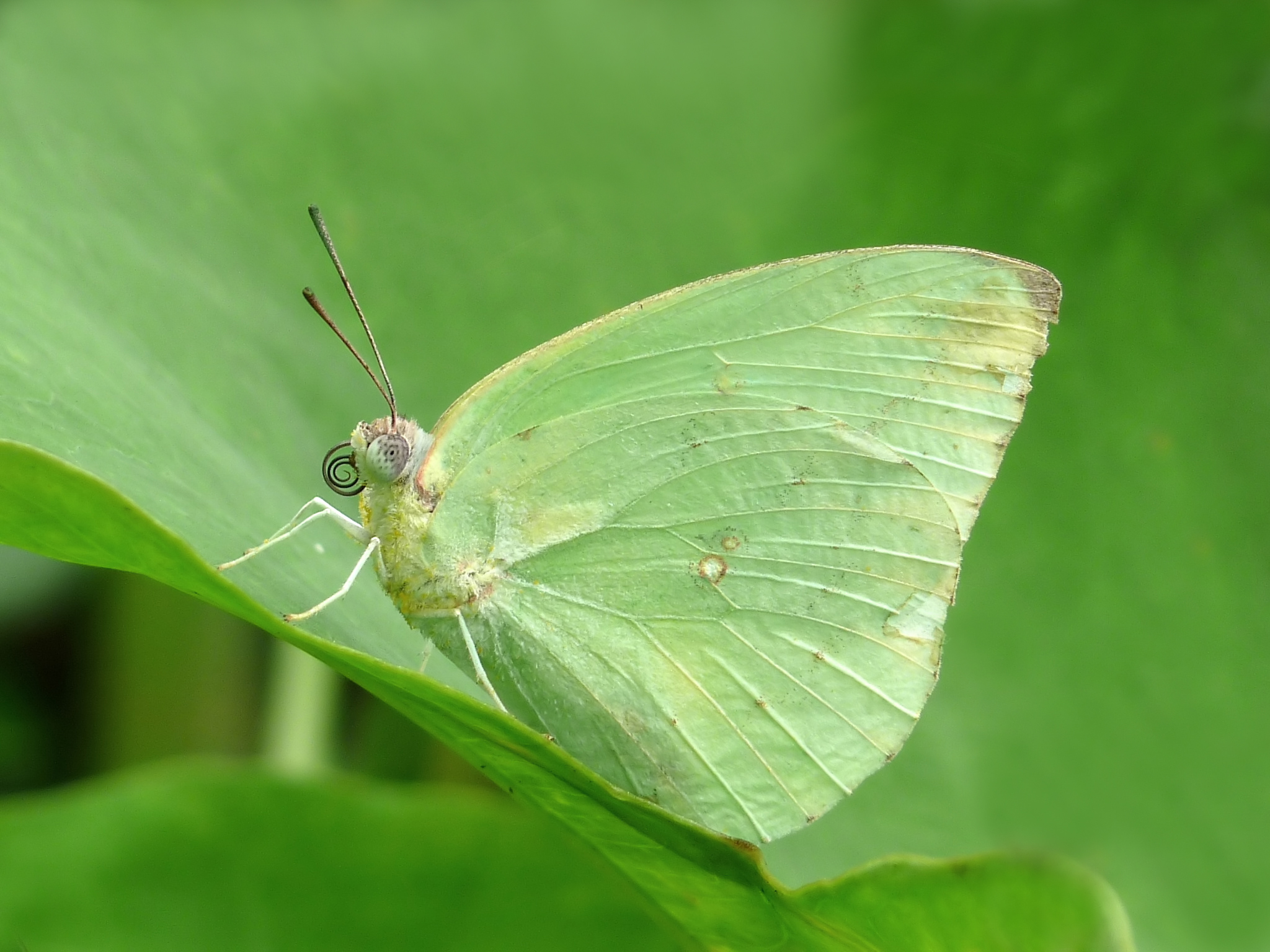
Ventral view

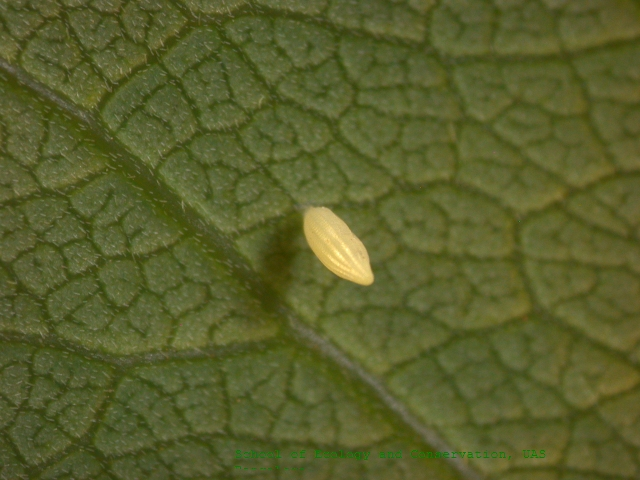
Egg

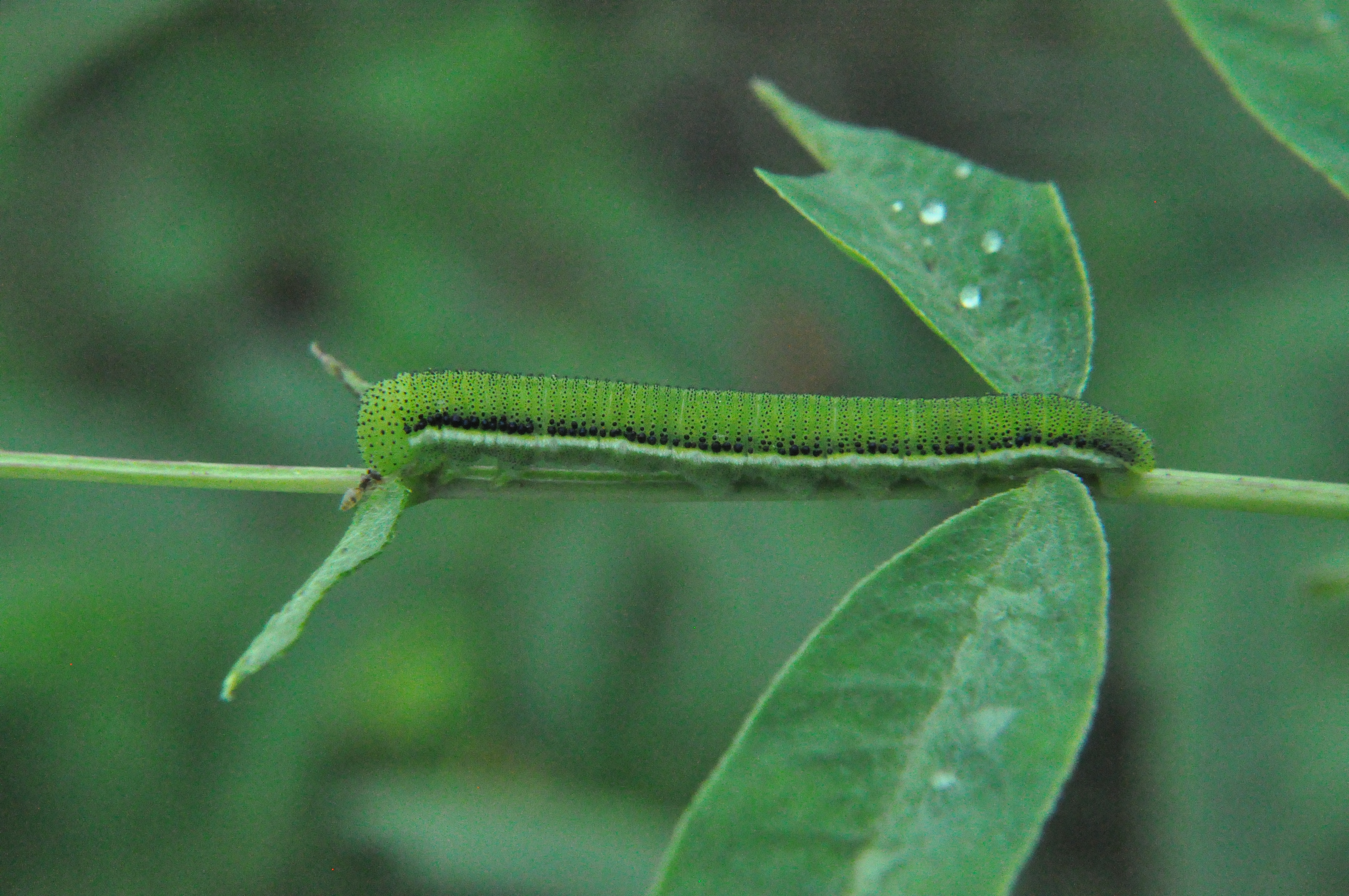
Larva

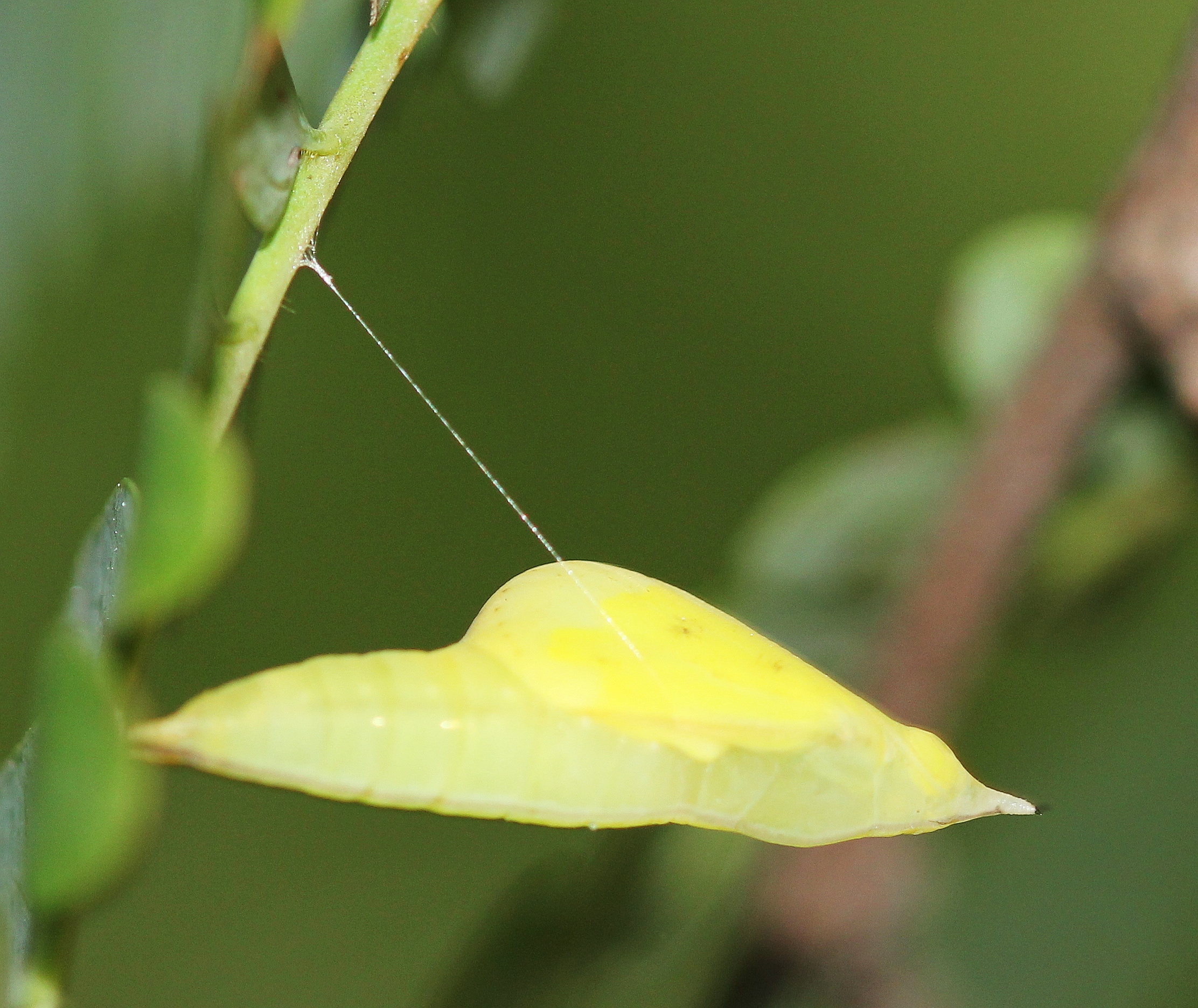
Pupa

===== Catopsilia pyranthe (mottled emigrant) =====
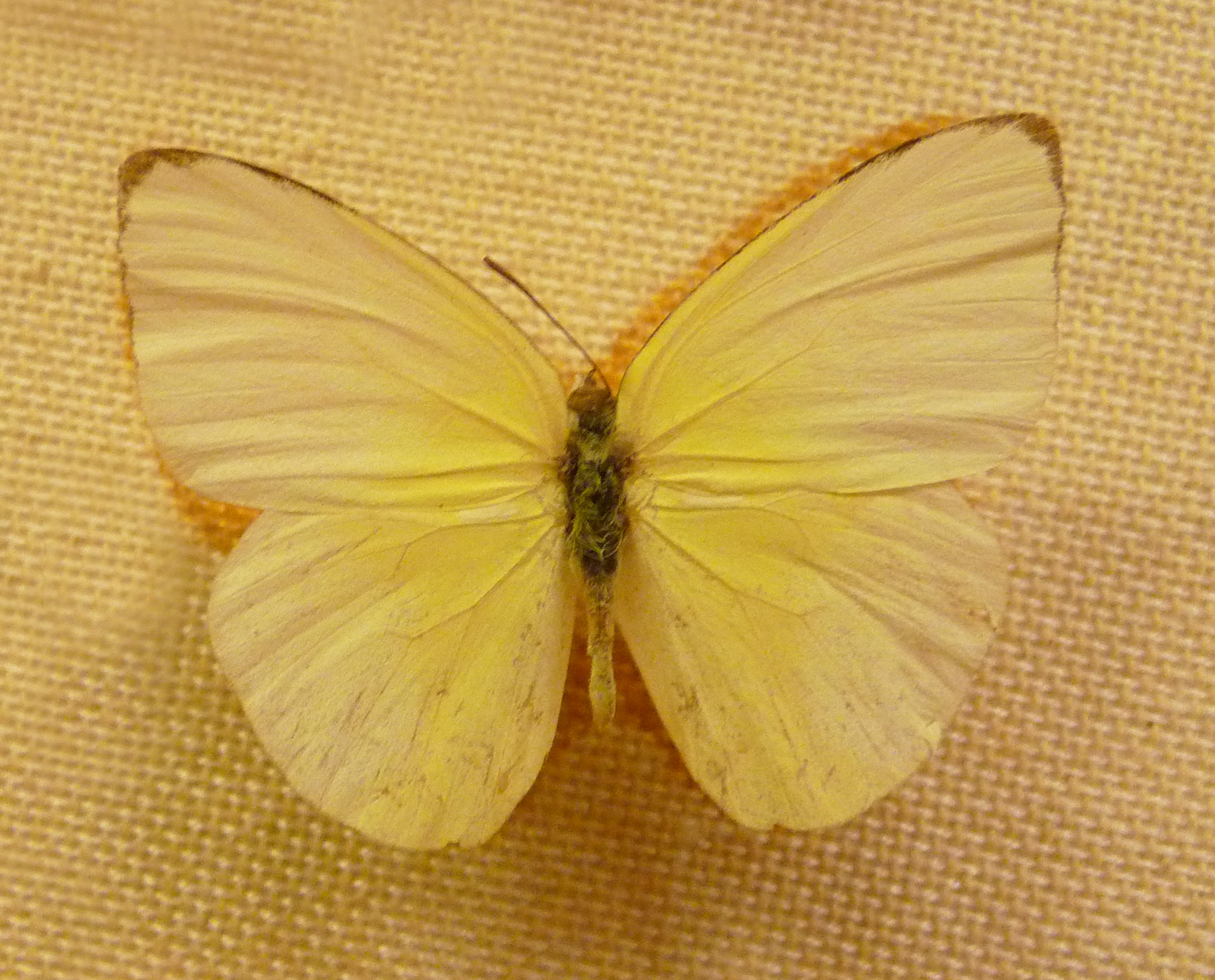
Dorsal view

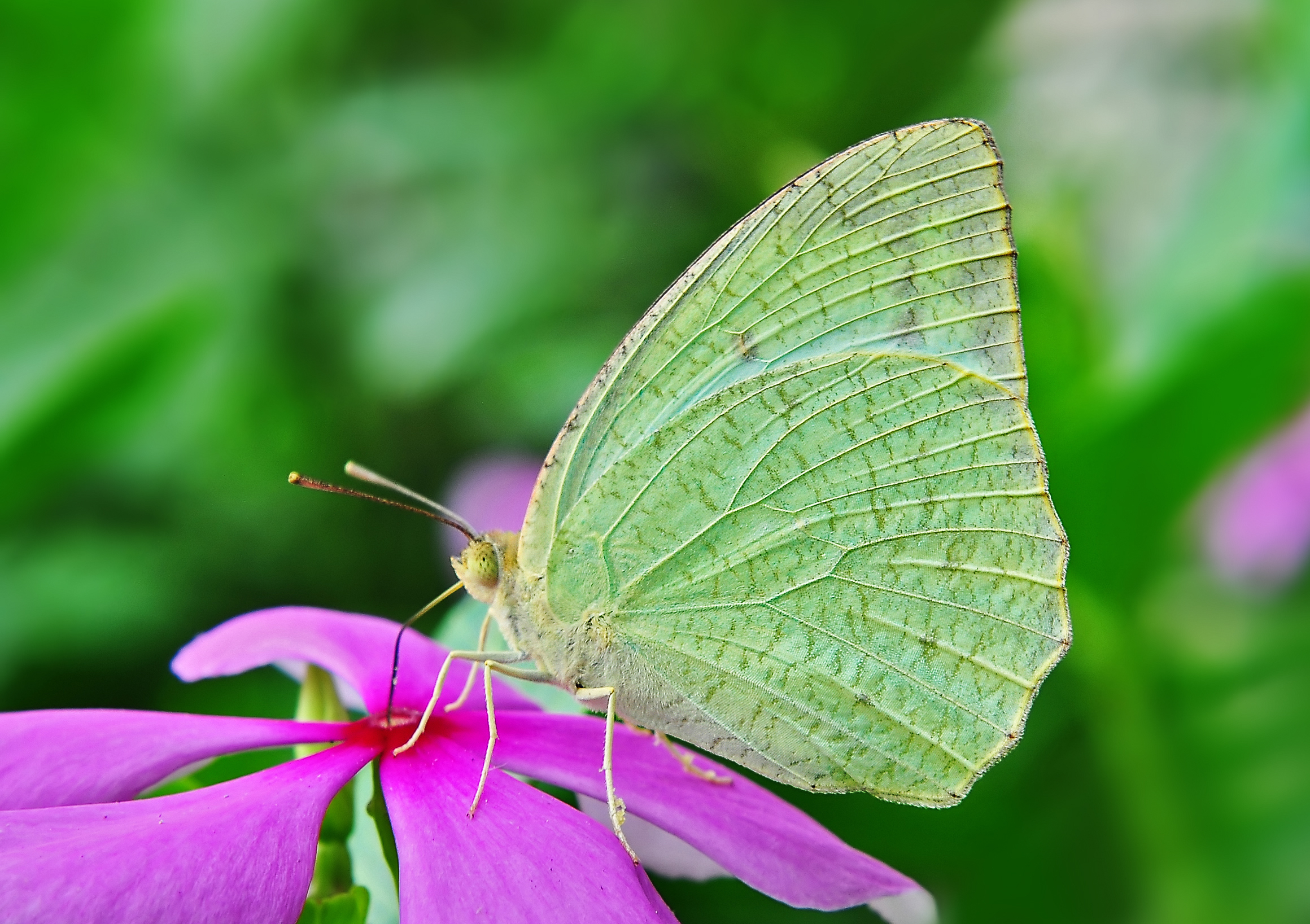
Ventral view (male)

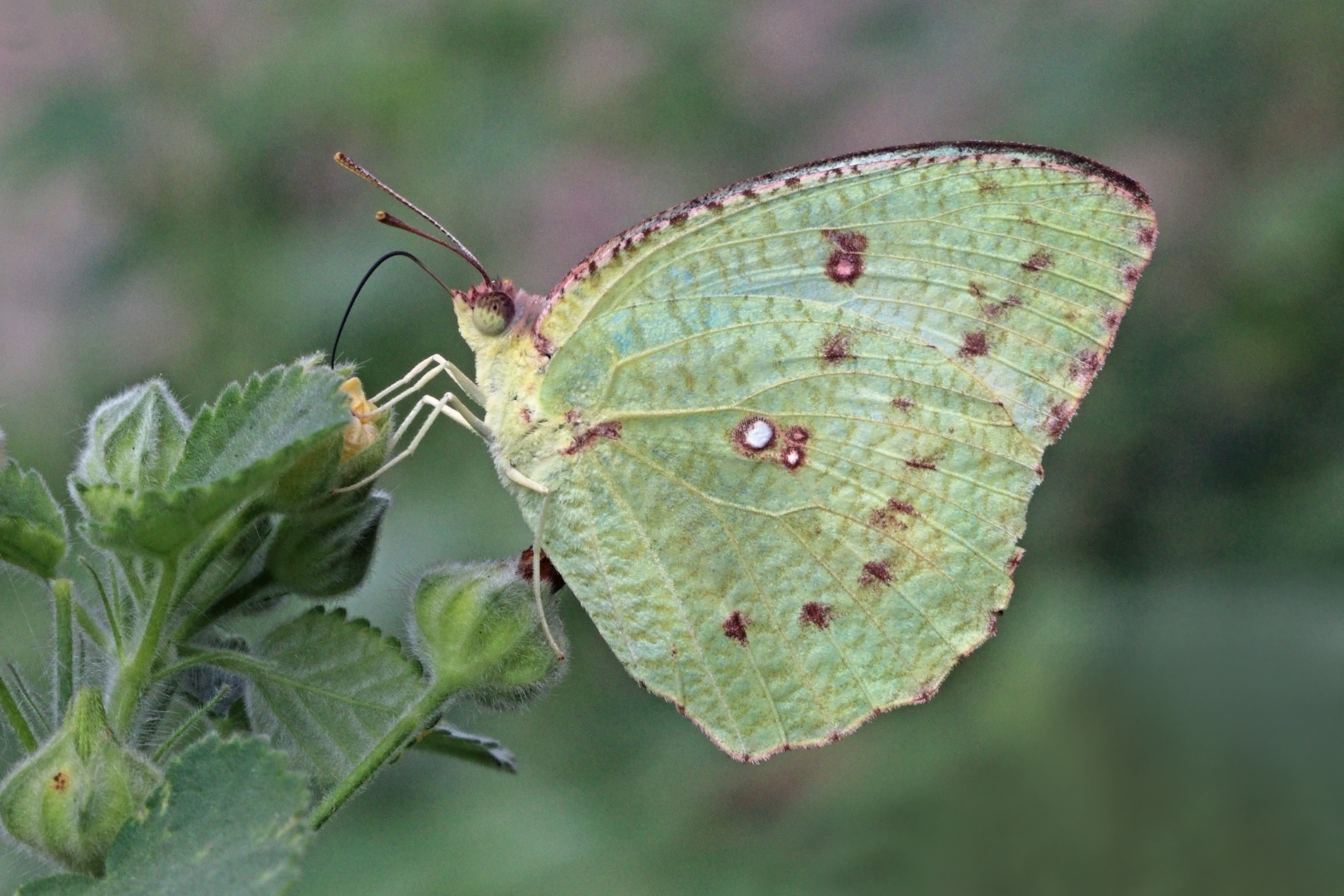
Ventral view (female)

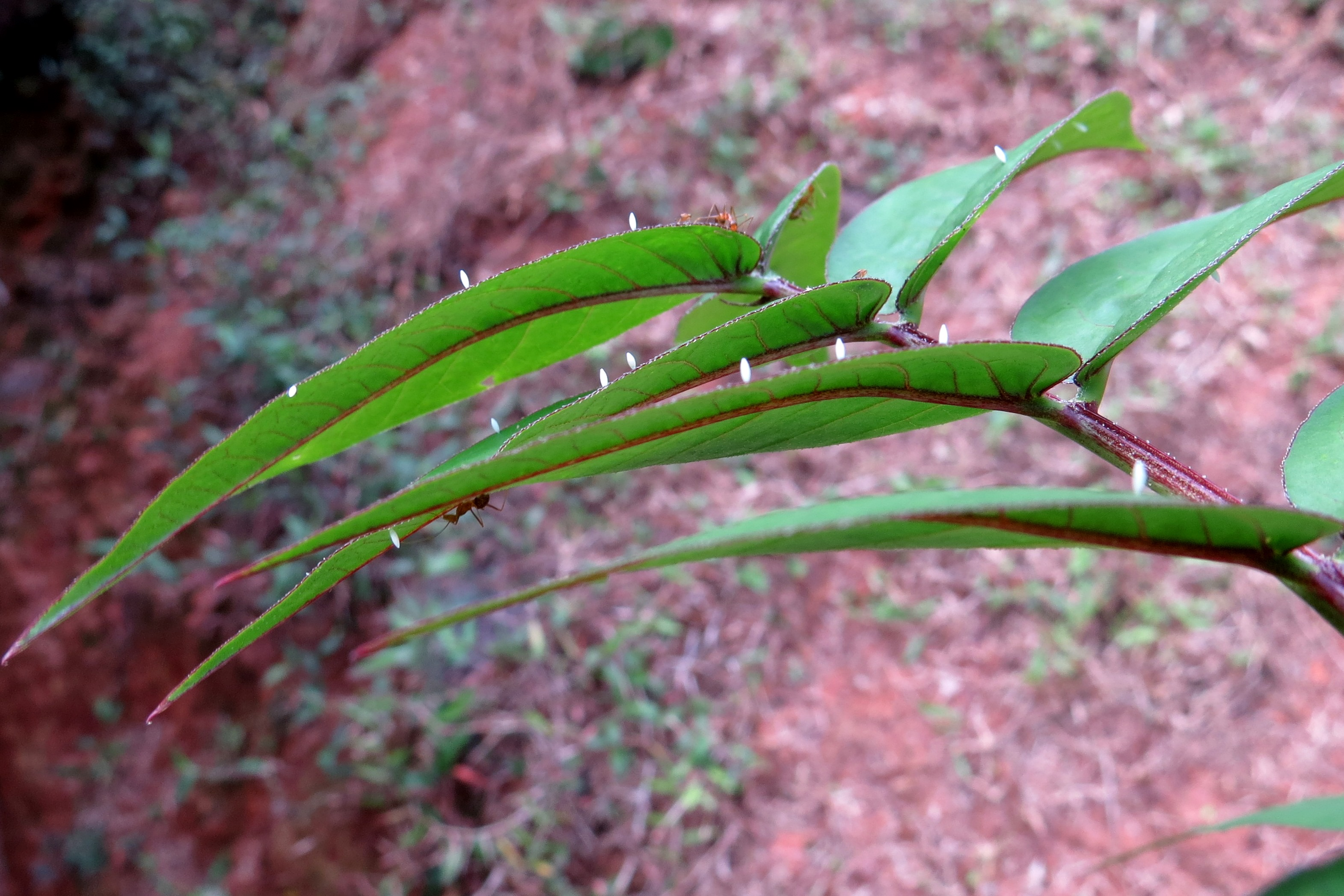
Eggs

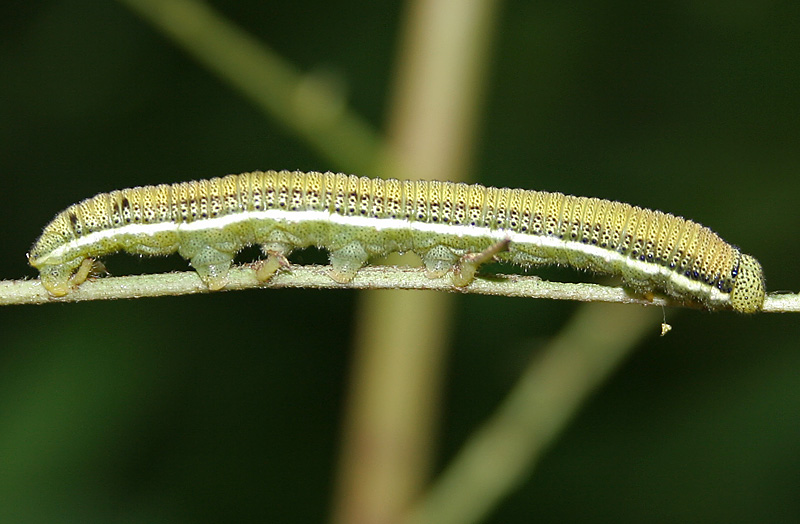
Larva

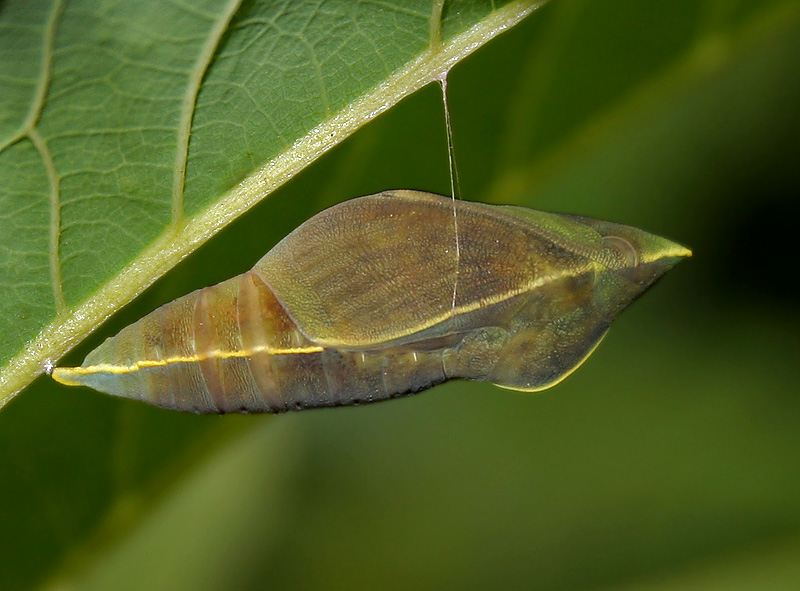
Pupa

==== Genus: Colias (clouded yellows) ====
===== Colias nilagiriensis (Nilgiri clouded yellow) =====
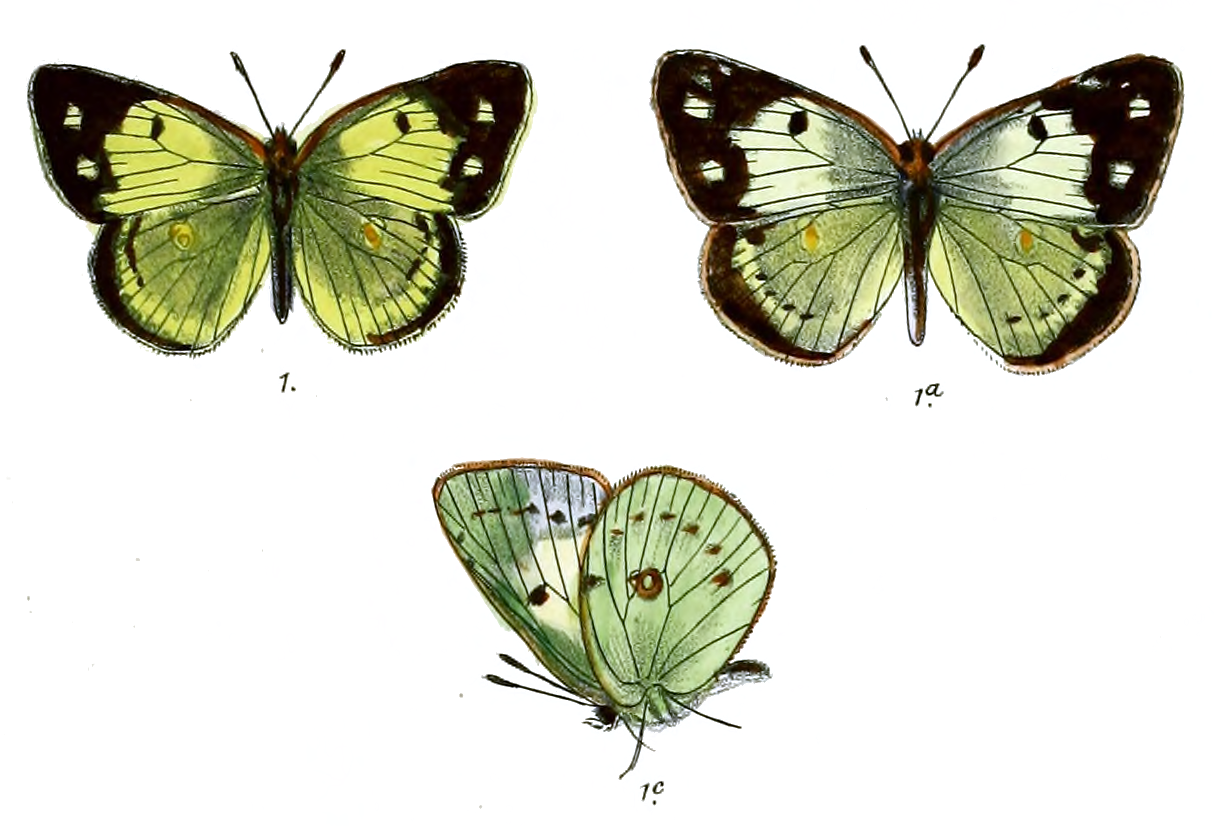
Dorsal view

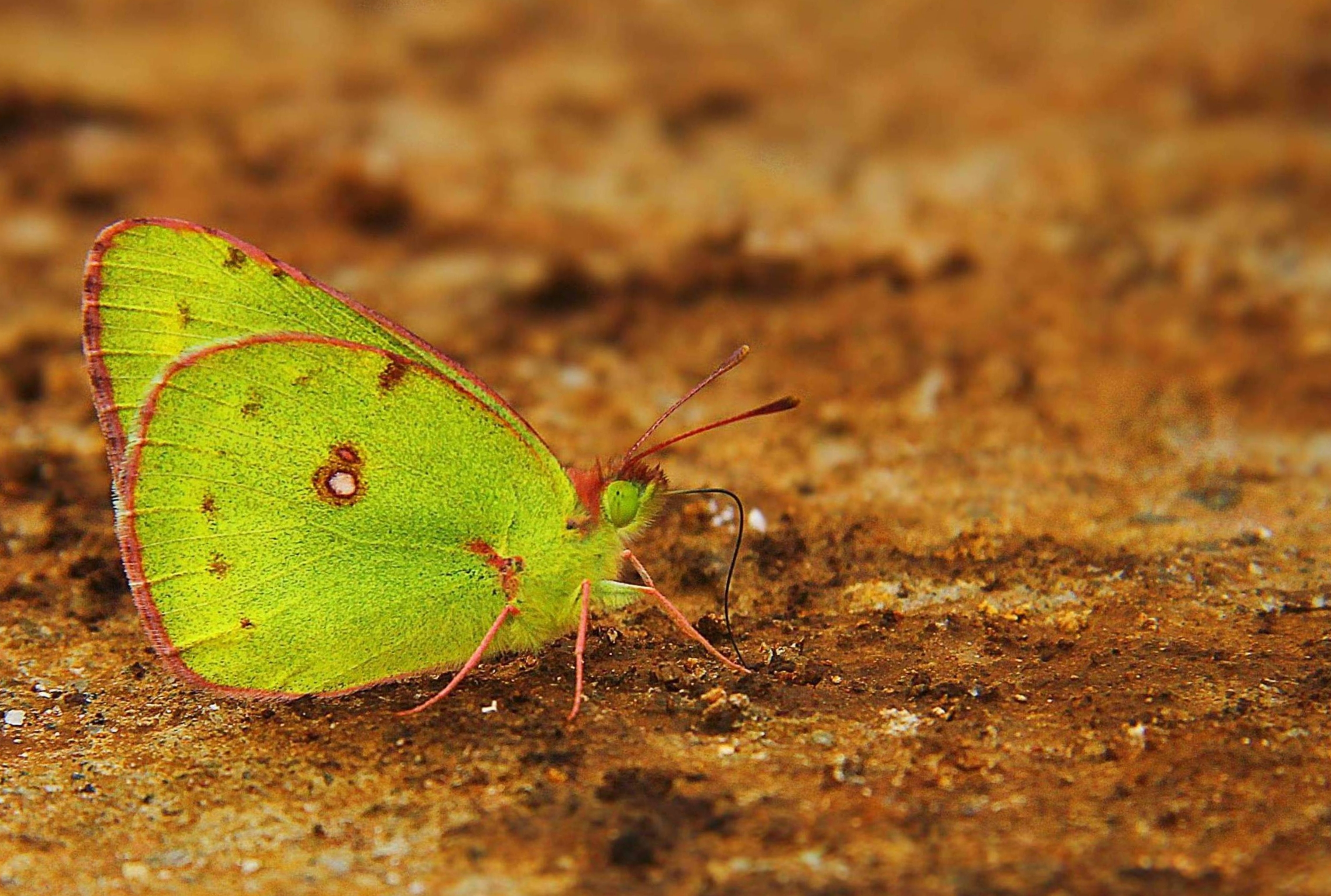
Ventral view (male)

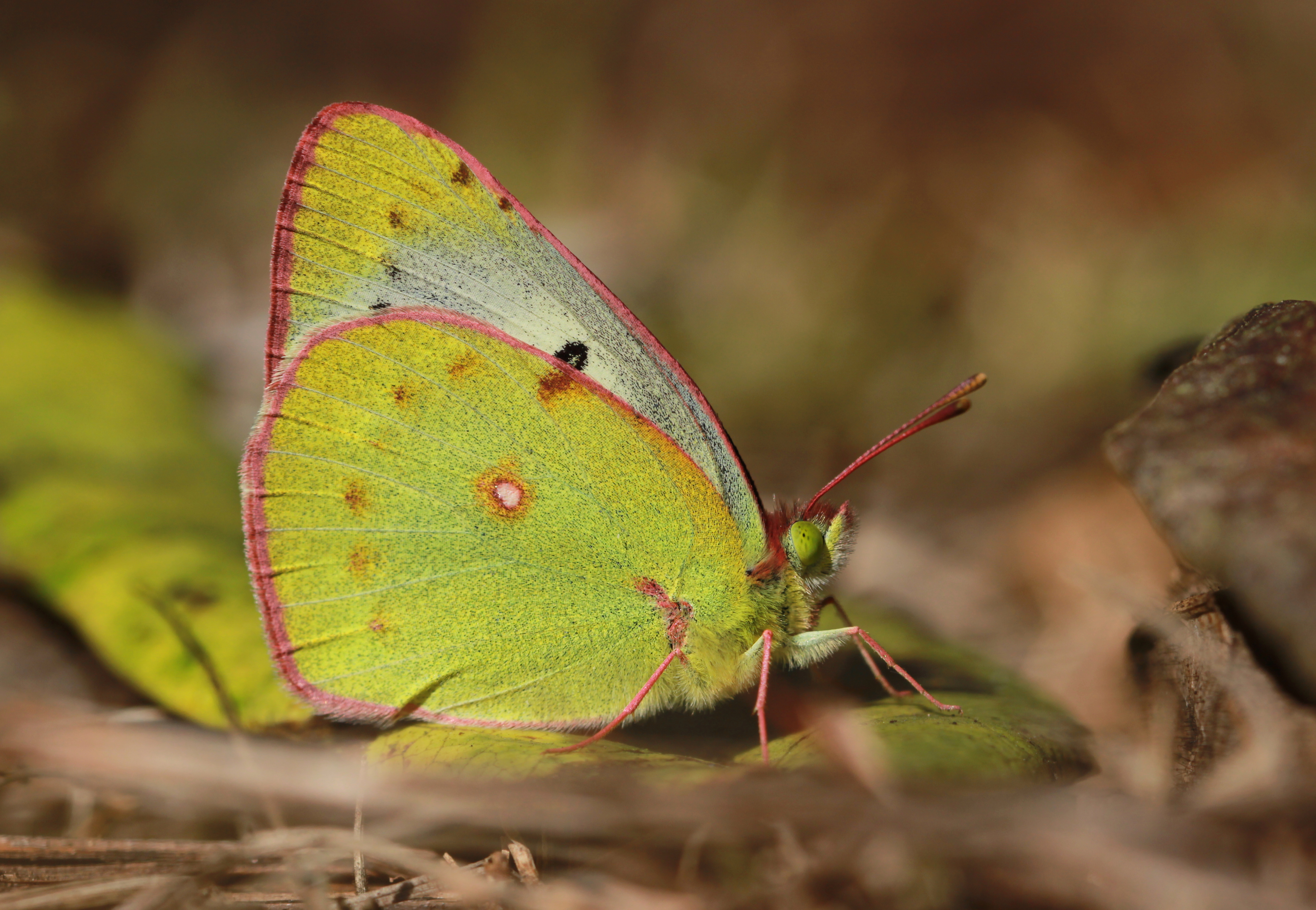
Ventral view (female)

==== Genus: Eurema (grass yellows) ====
===== Eurema andersonii (one-spot grass yellow) =====
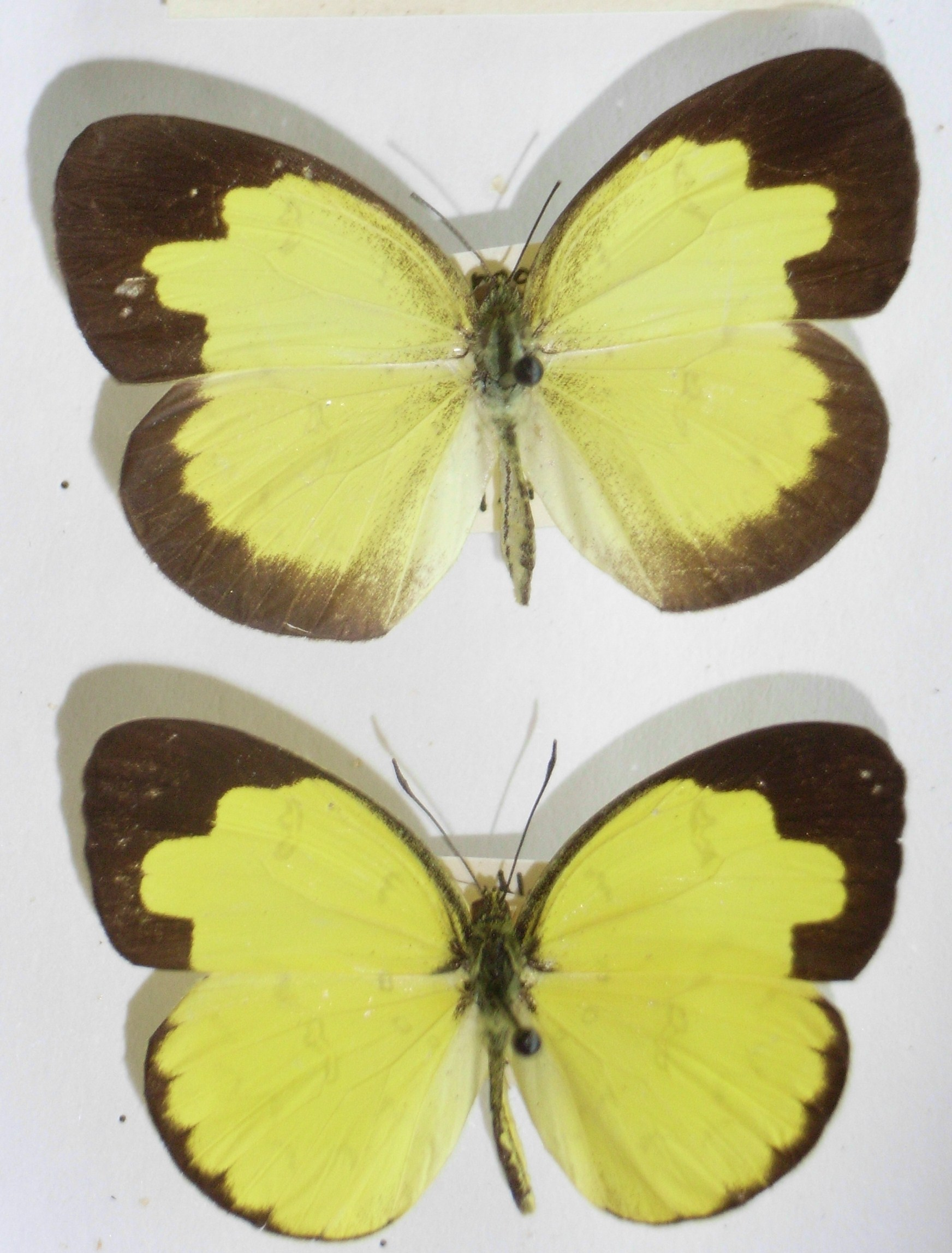
Dorsal view

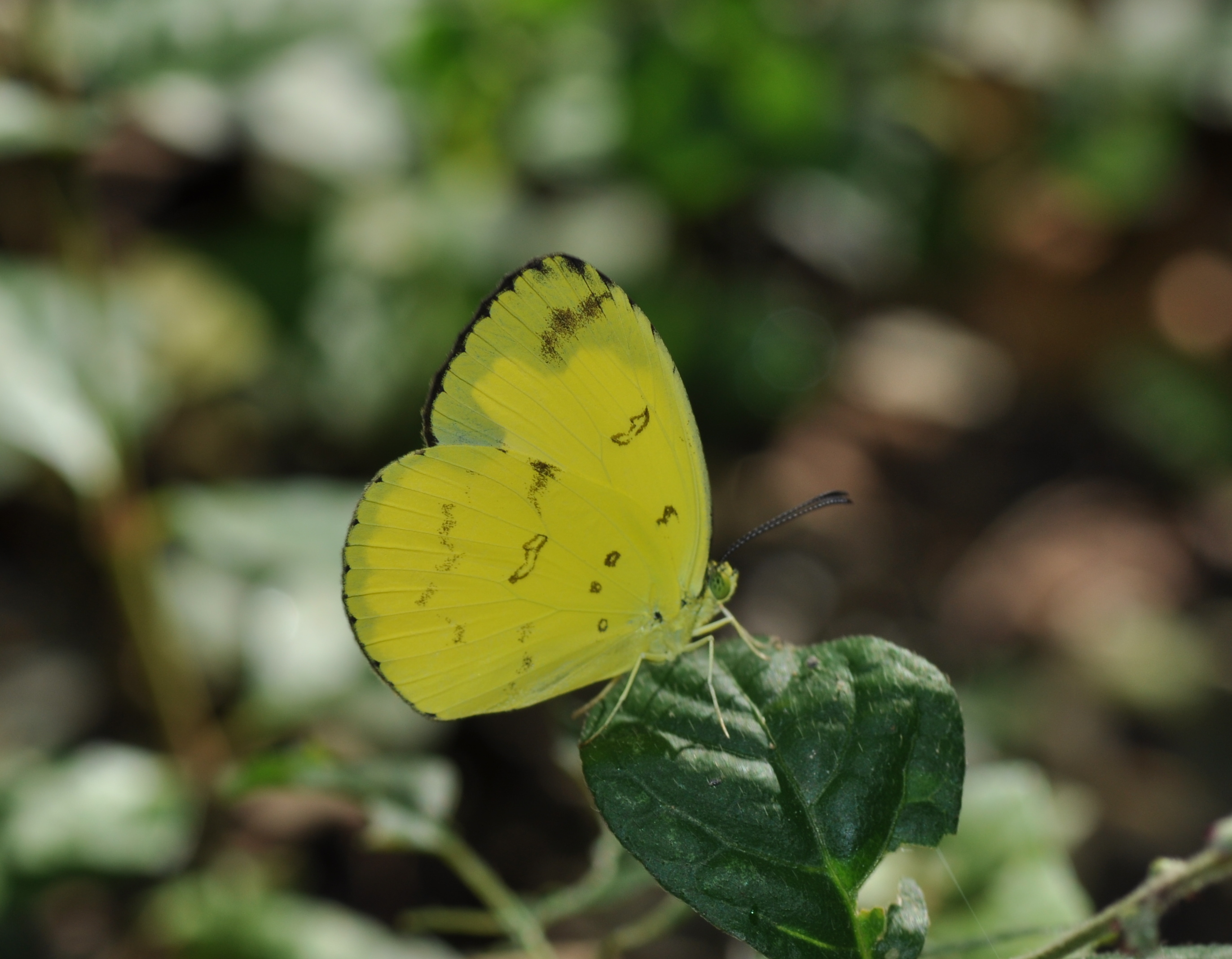
Ventral view

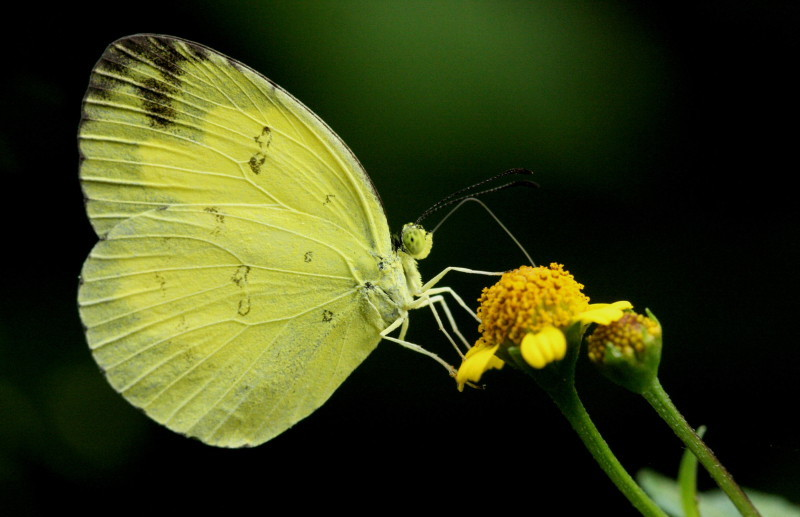
Ventral view

===== Eurema blanda (three-spot grass yellow) =====
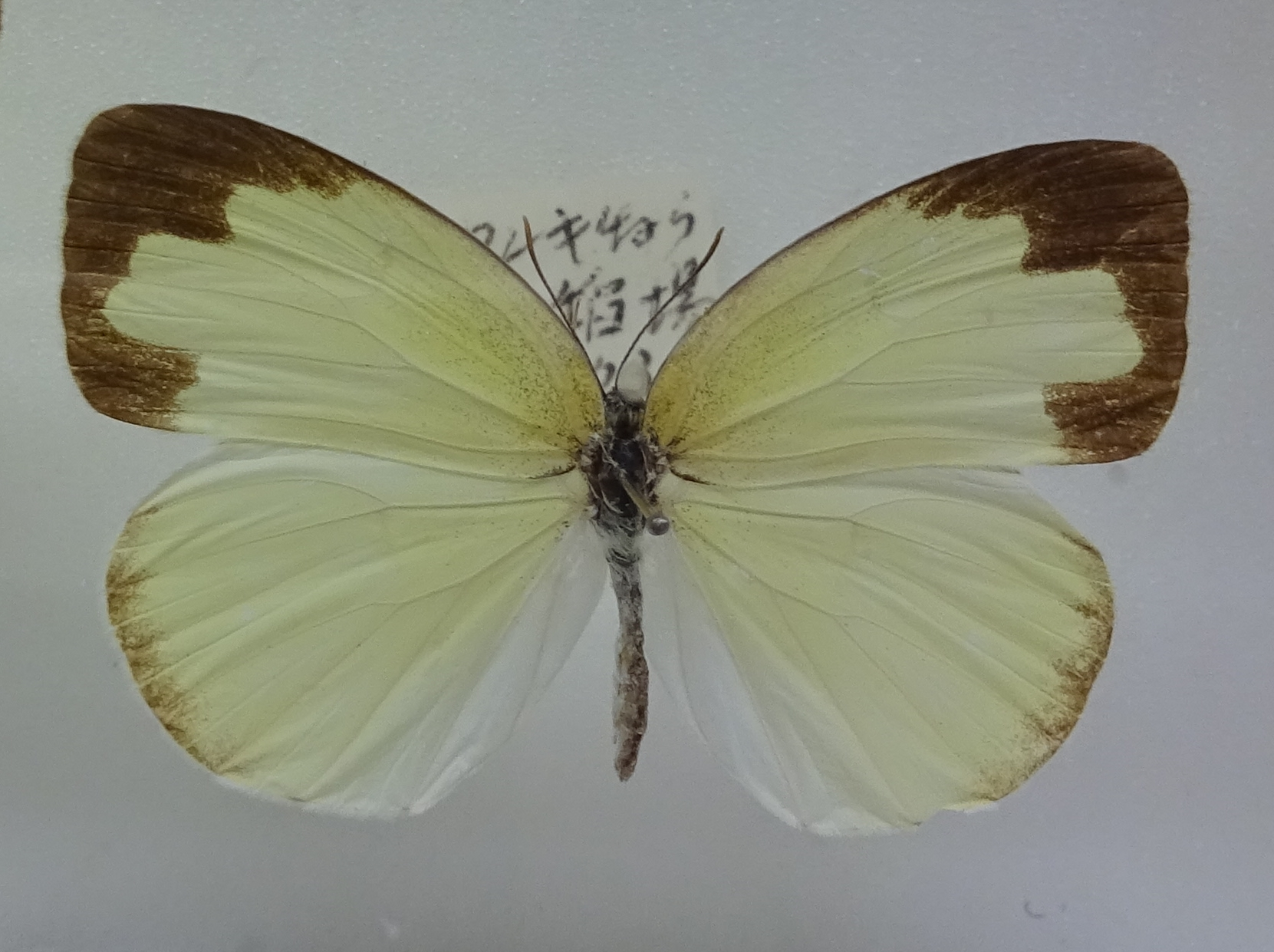
Dorsal view

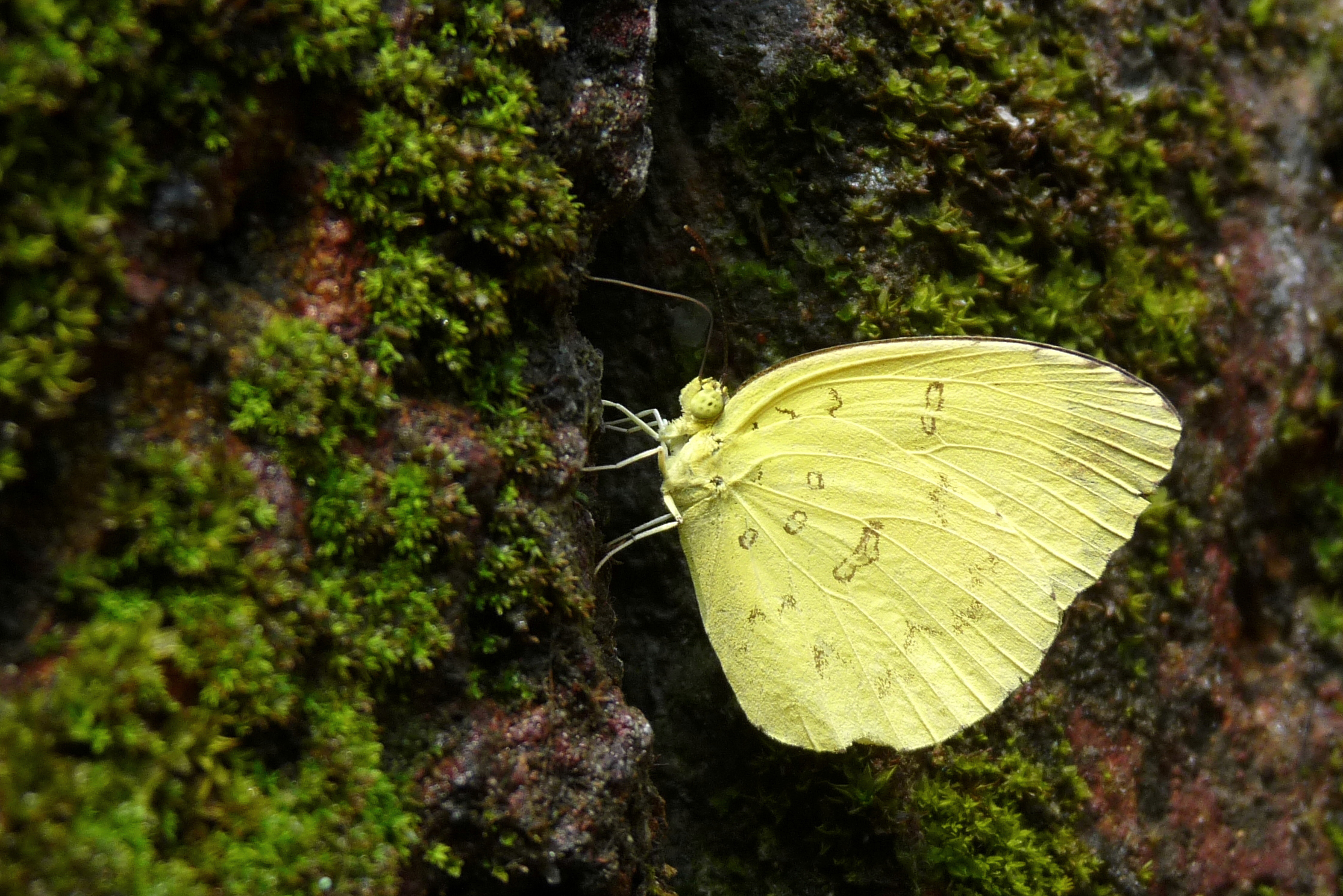
Ventral view

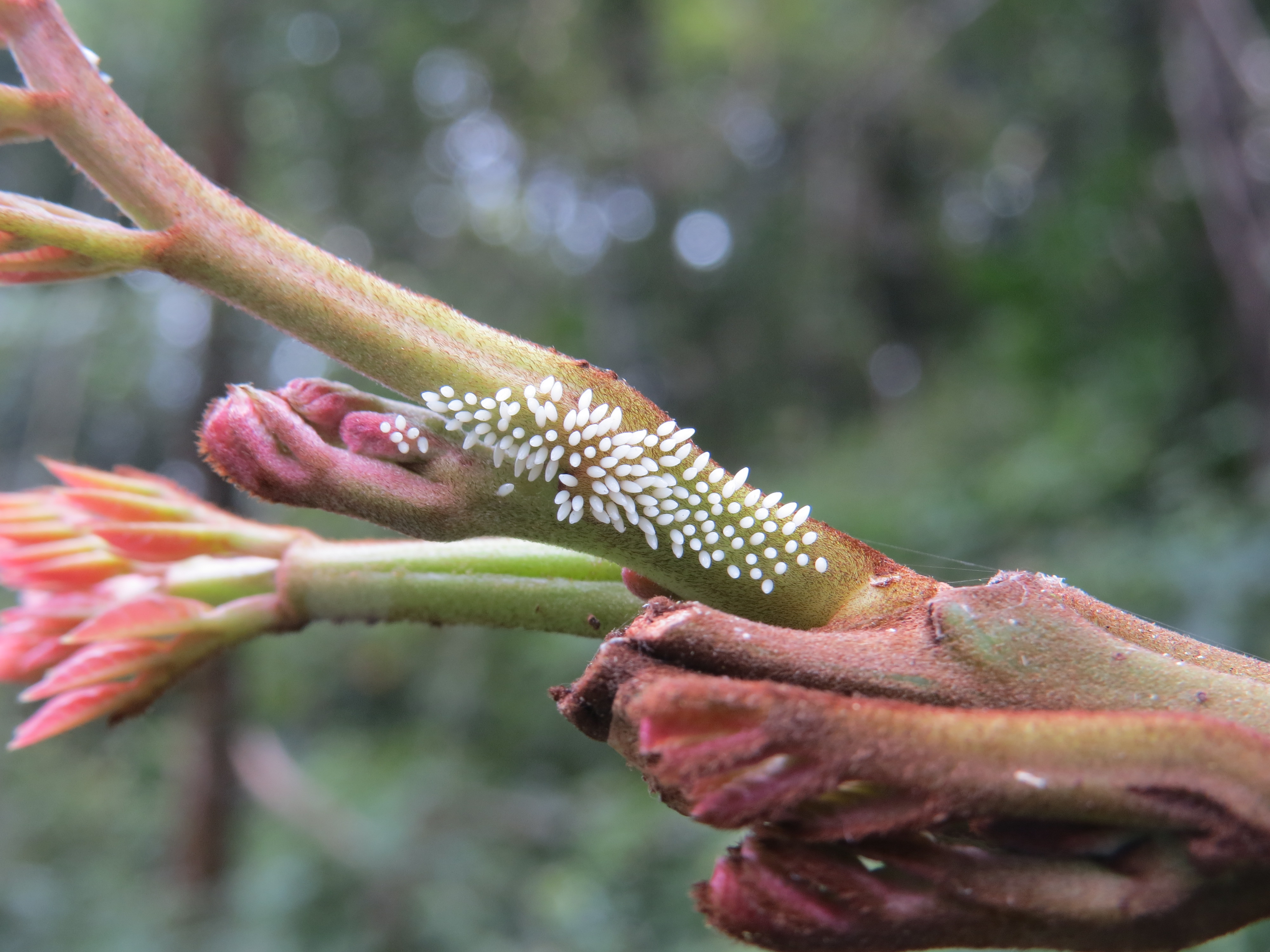
Eggs

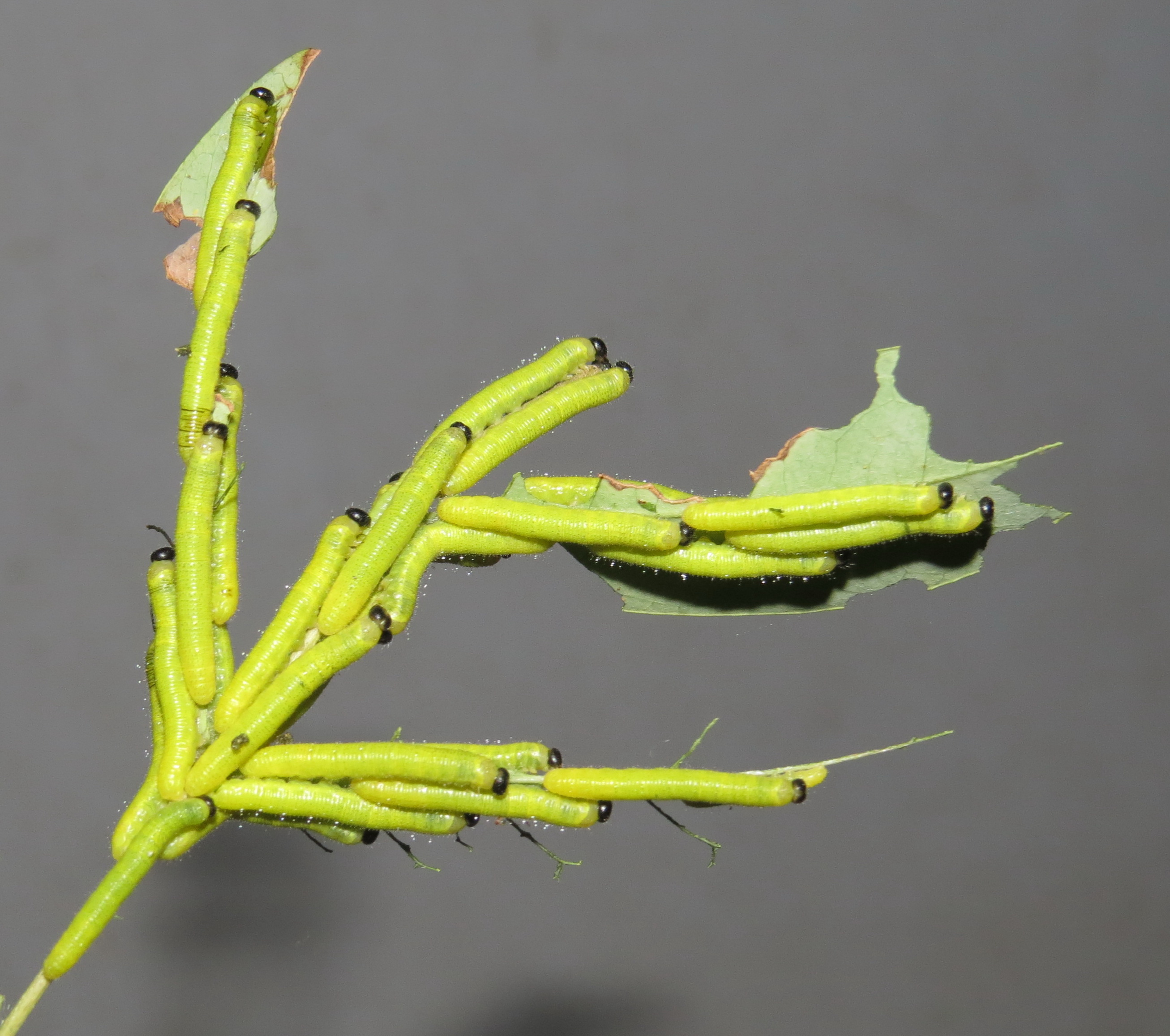
Larvae

===== Eurema brigitta (small grass yellow) =====
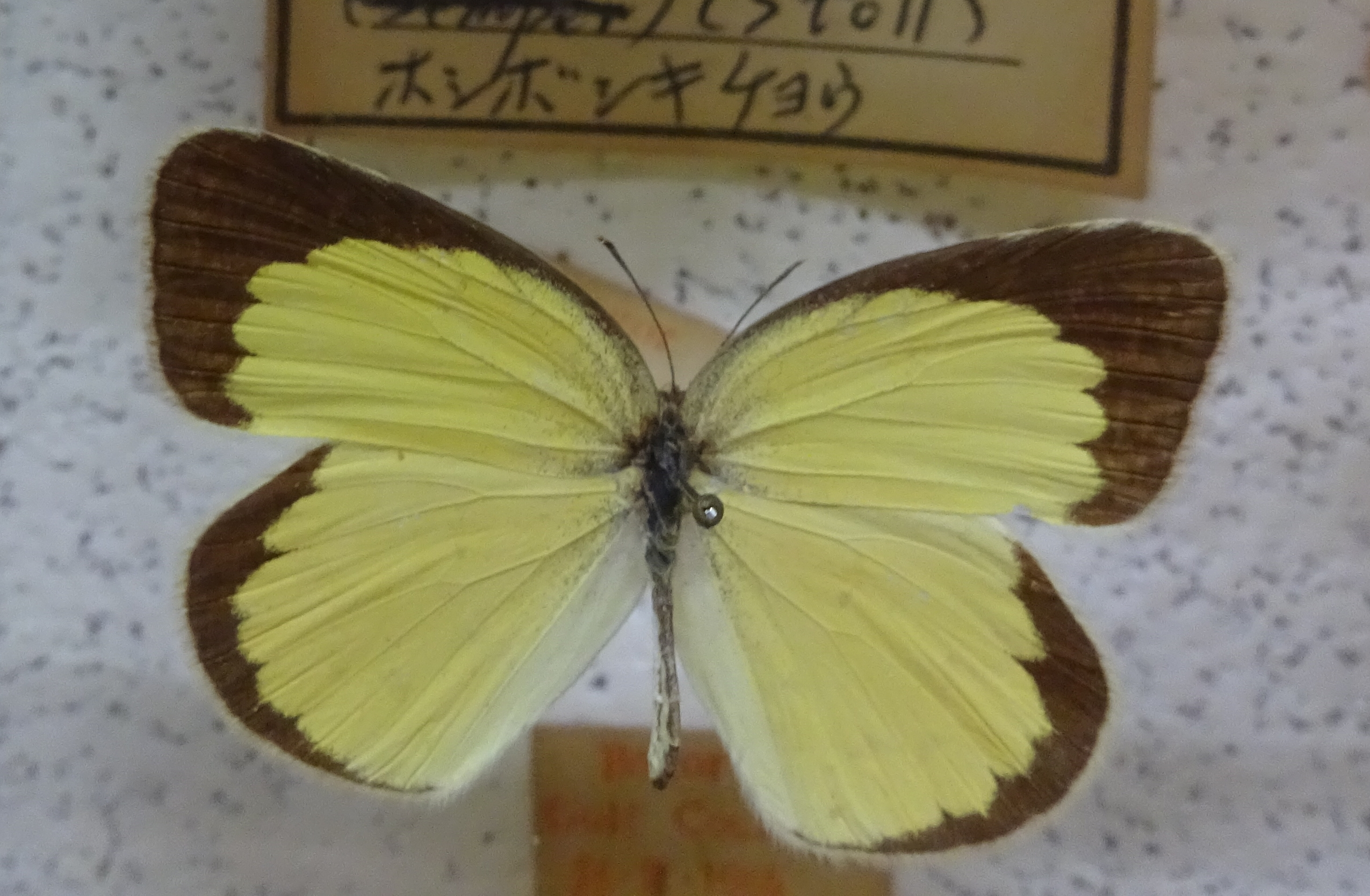
Dorsal view

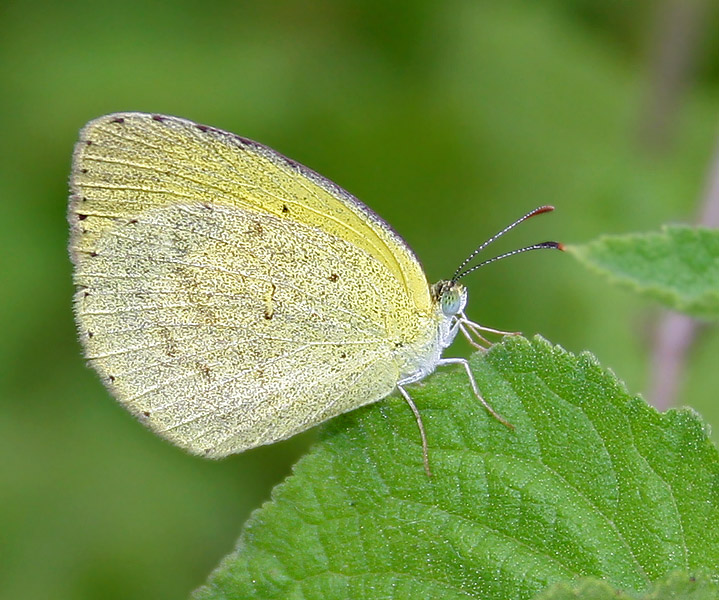
Ventral view

===== Eurema hecabe (common grass yellow) =====
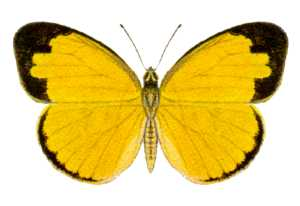
Dorsal view

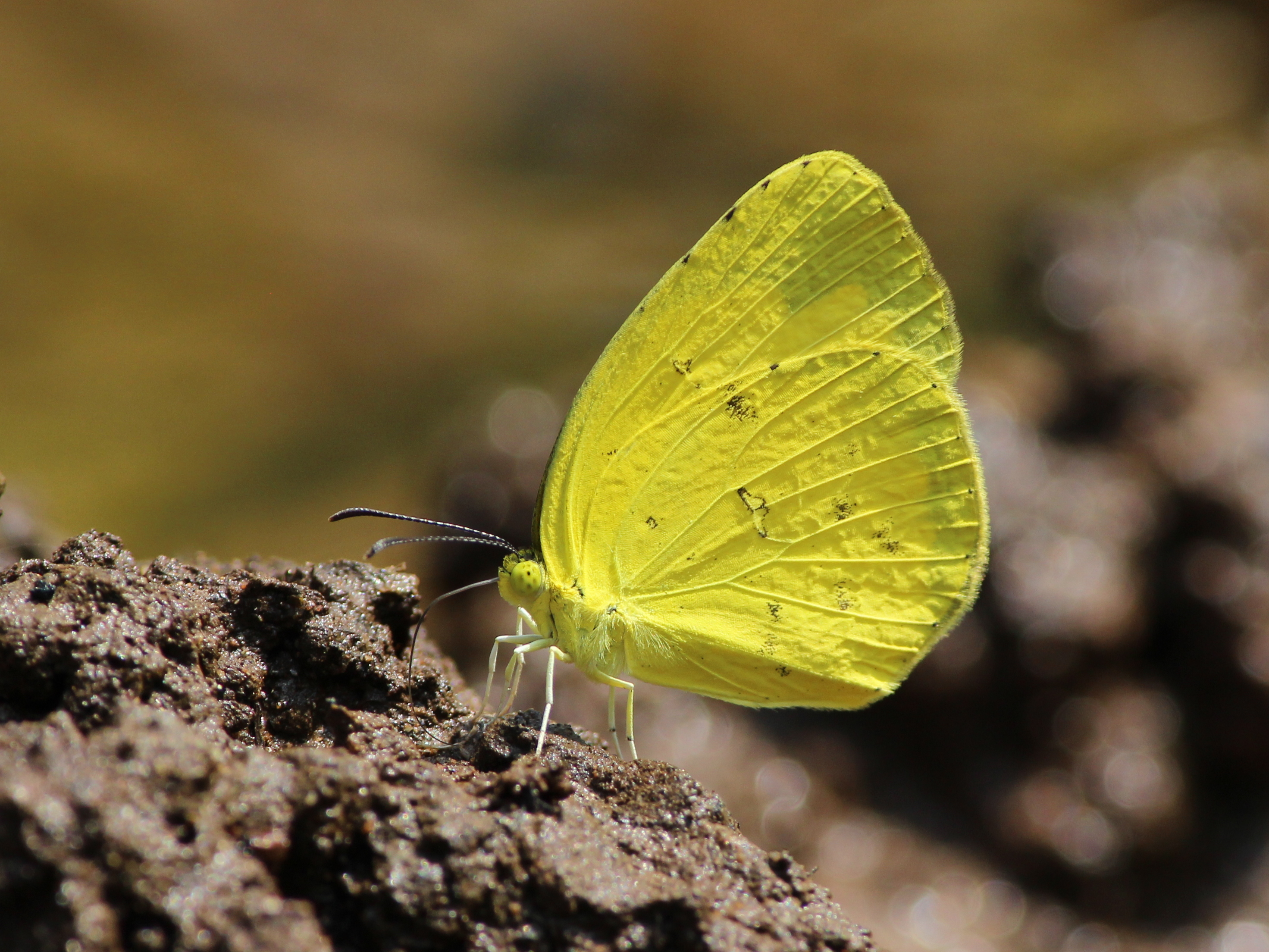
Ventral view

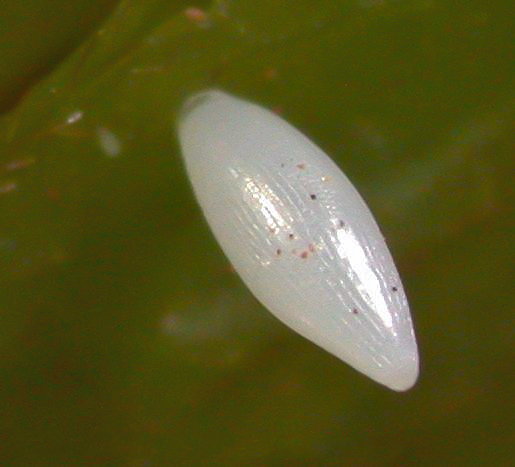
Egg

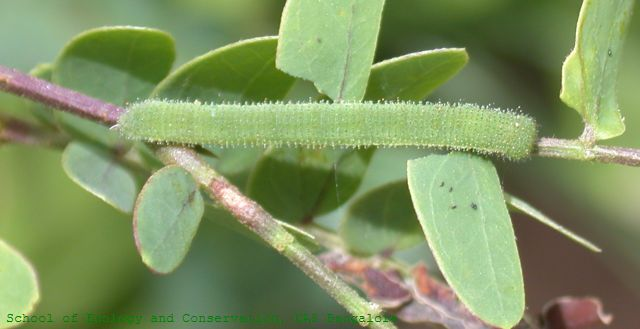
Larva

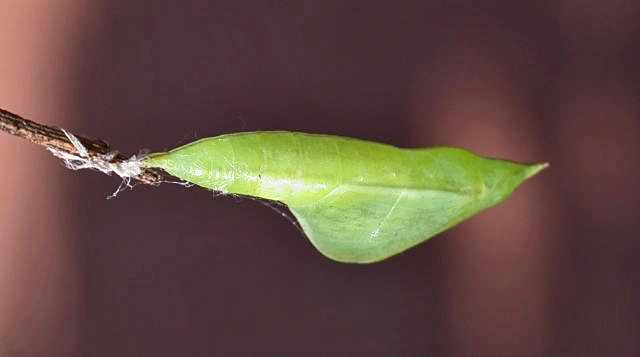
Pupa

===== Eurema laeta (spotless grass yellow) =====
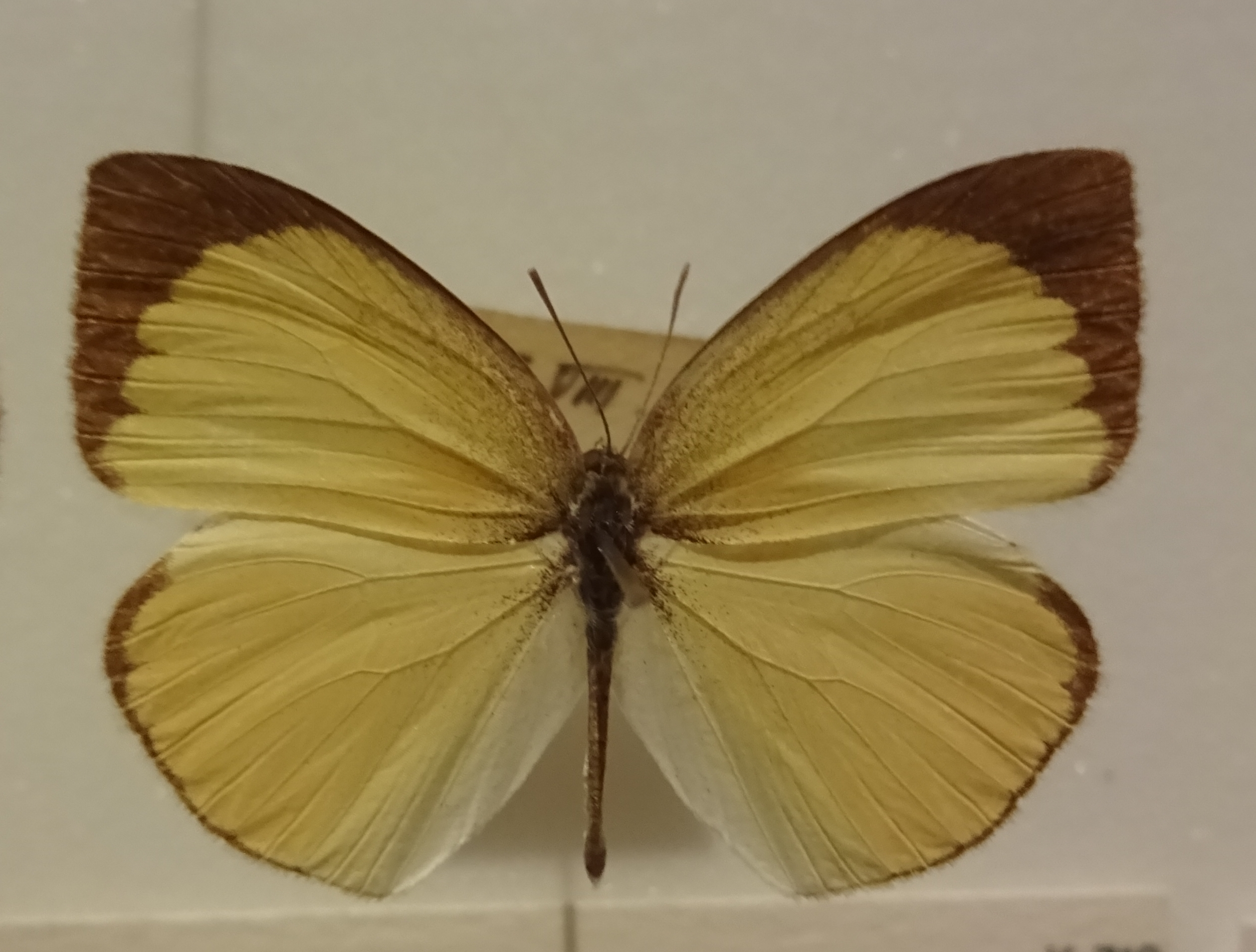
Dorsal view

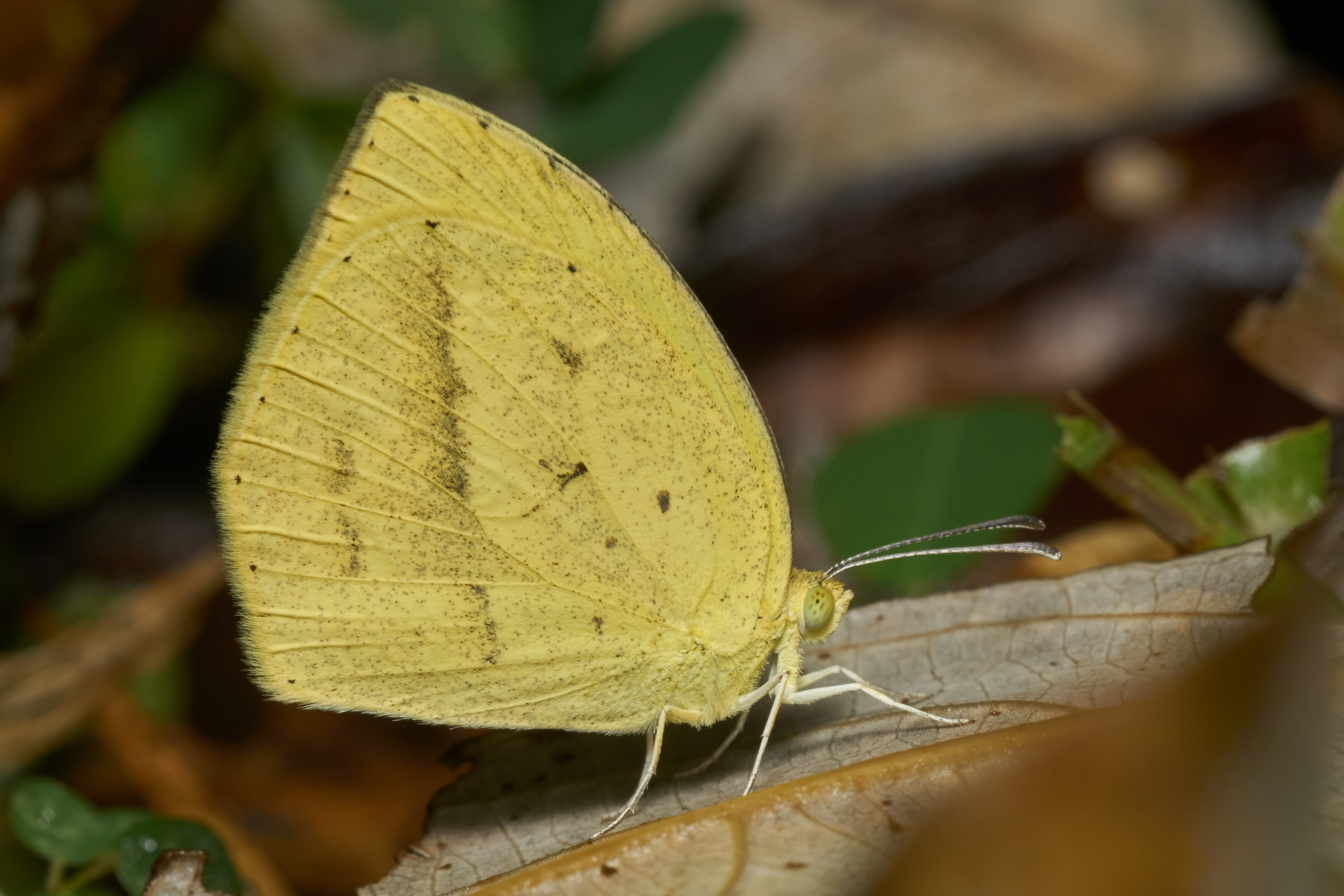
Ventral view

===== Eurema nilgiriensis (Nilgiri grass yellow) =====
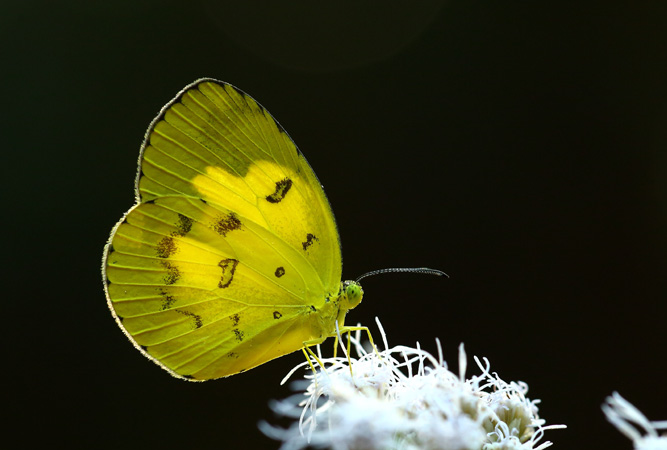
Ventral view

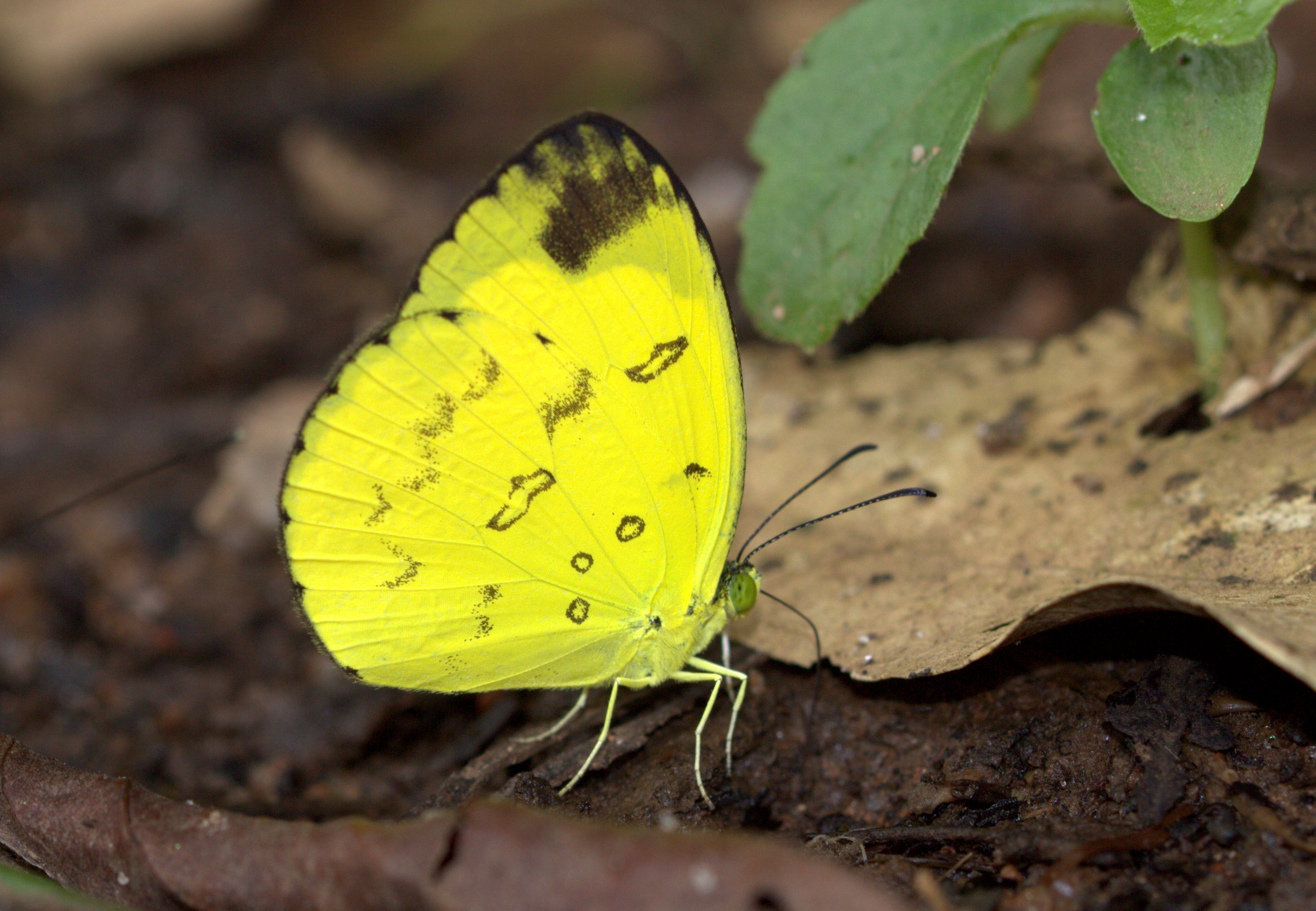
Ventral view

=== Subfamily: Pierinae (whites) ===
==== Genus: Appias (puffins and albatrosses) ====
===== Appias albina (common albatross) =====
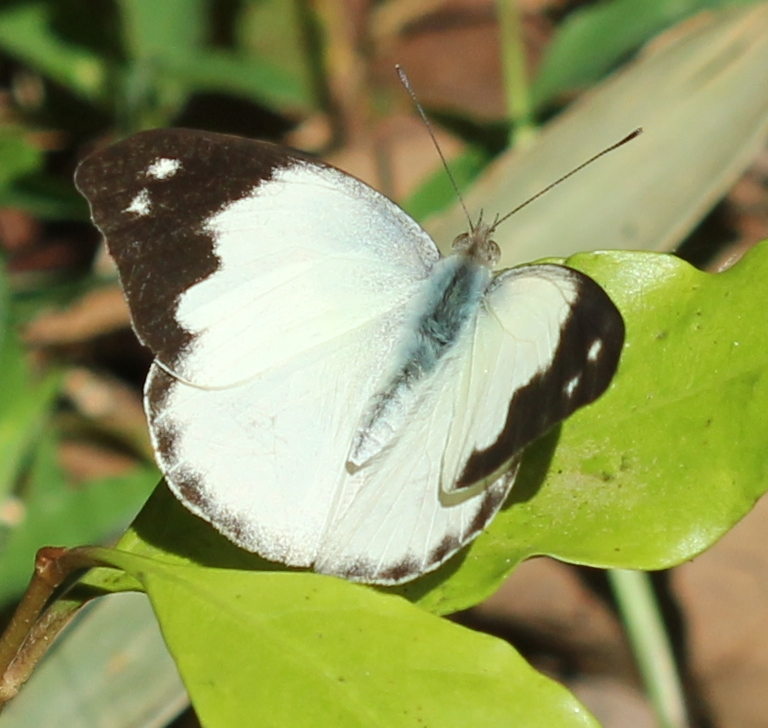
Dorsal view

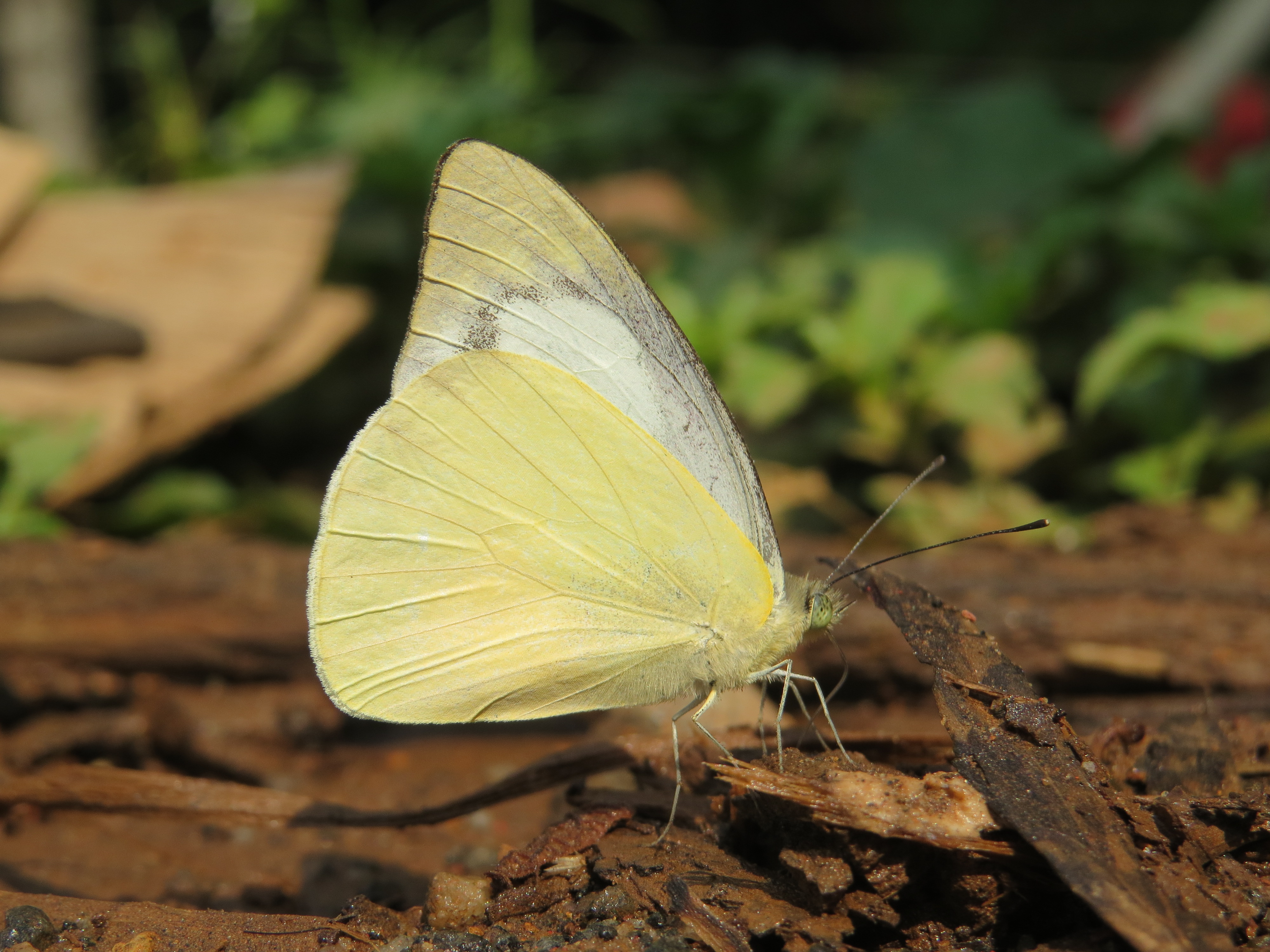
Ventral view (male)

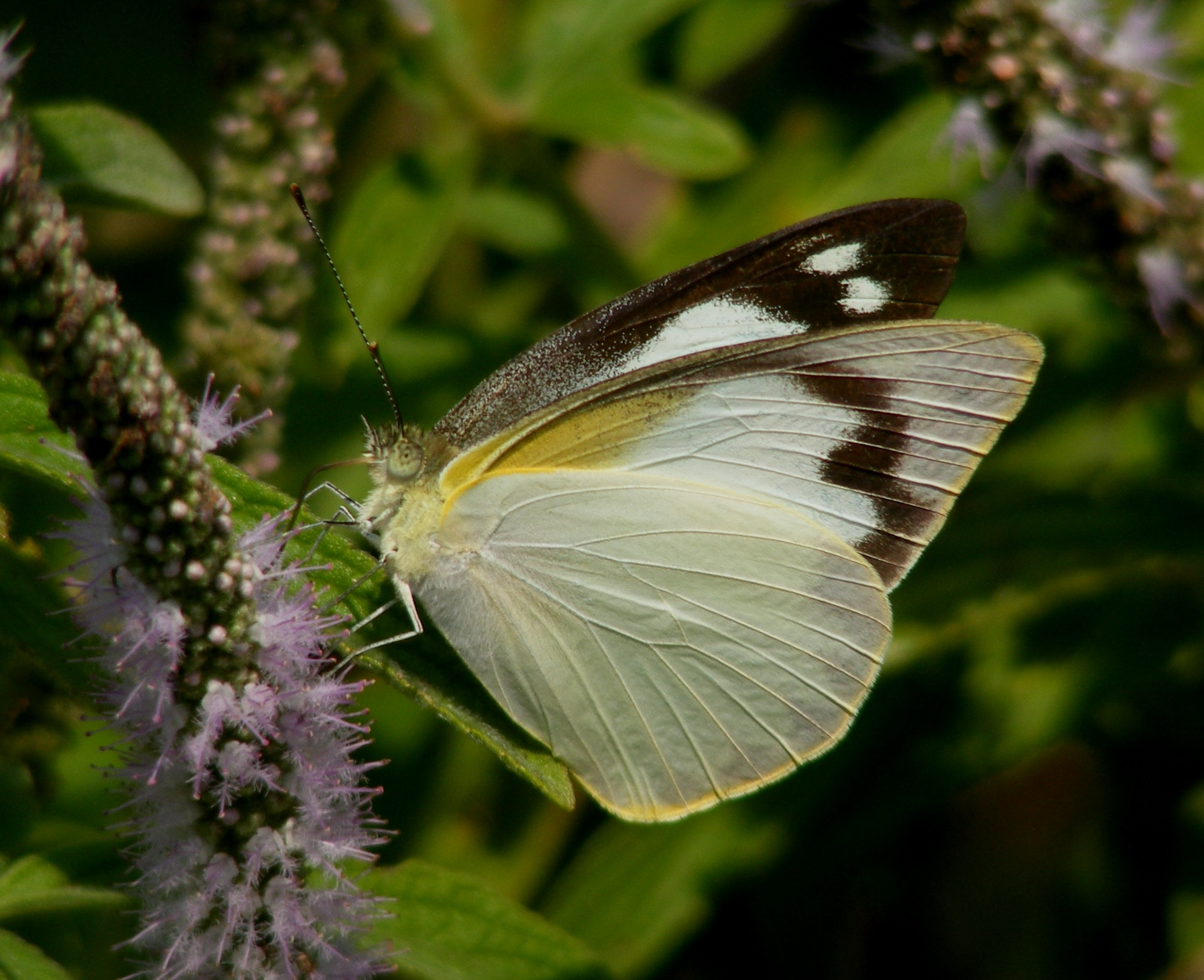
Ventral view (female)

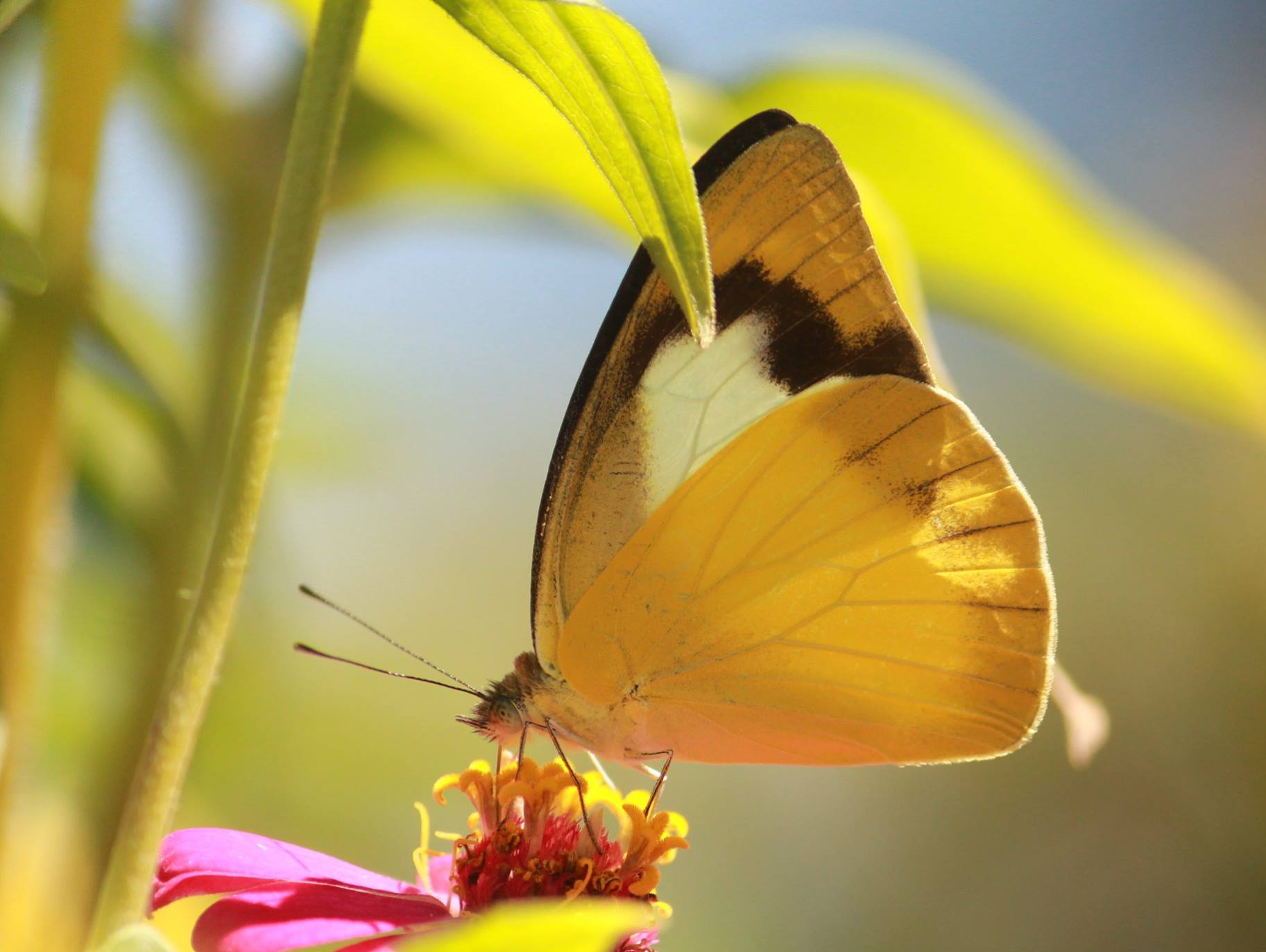
Form semiflava (female)

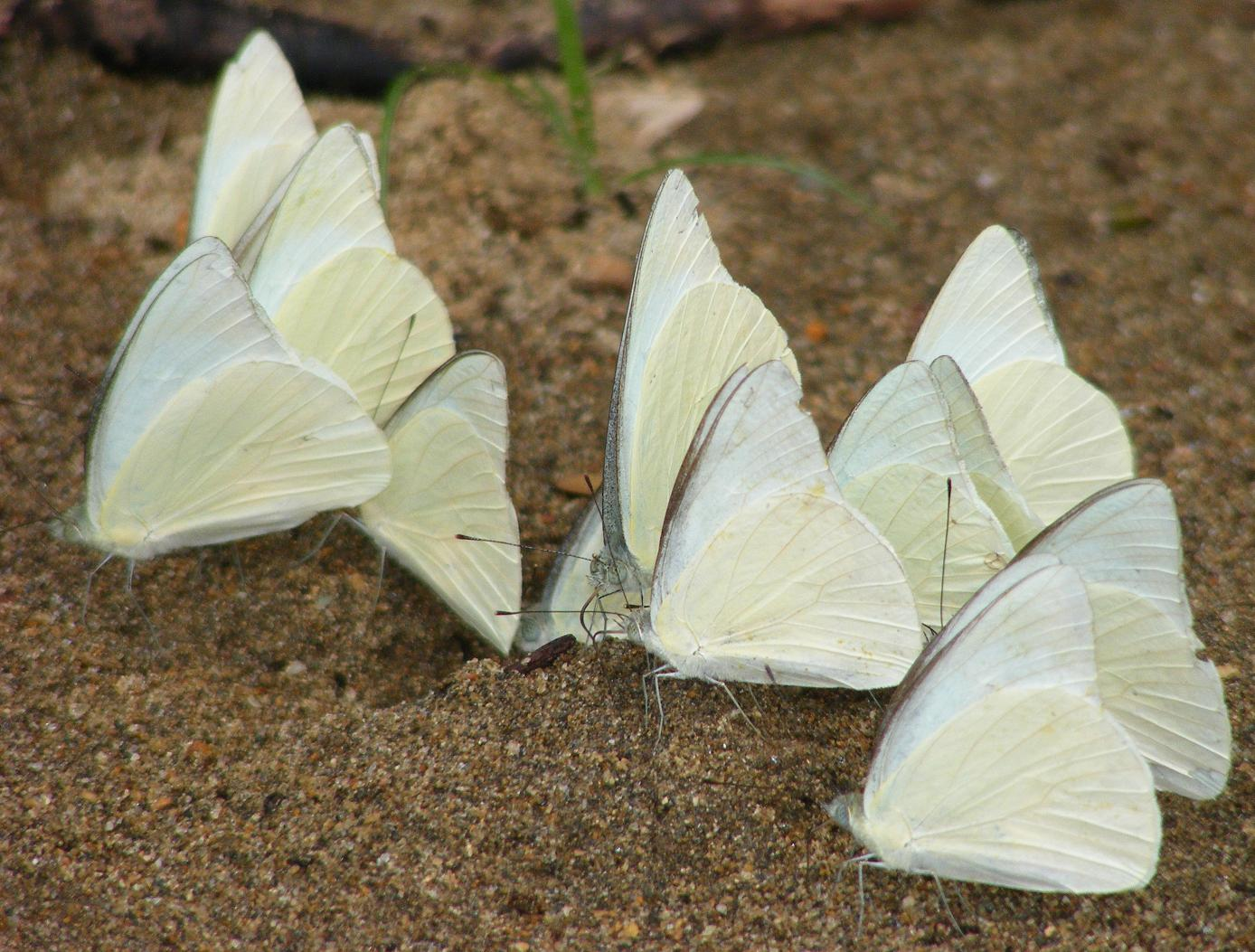
Mud puddling

===== Appias indra (plain puffin) =====
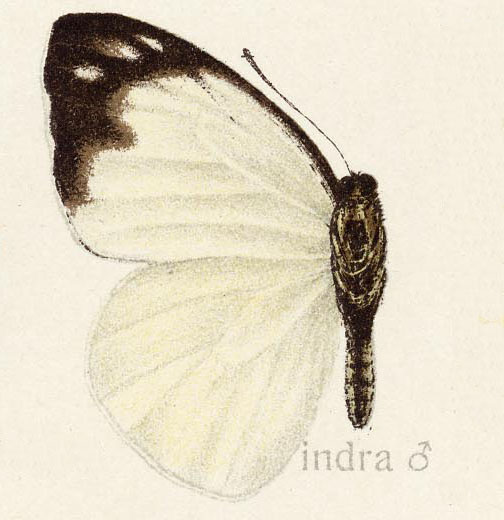
Dorsal view

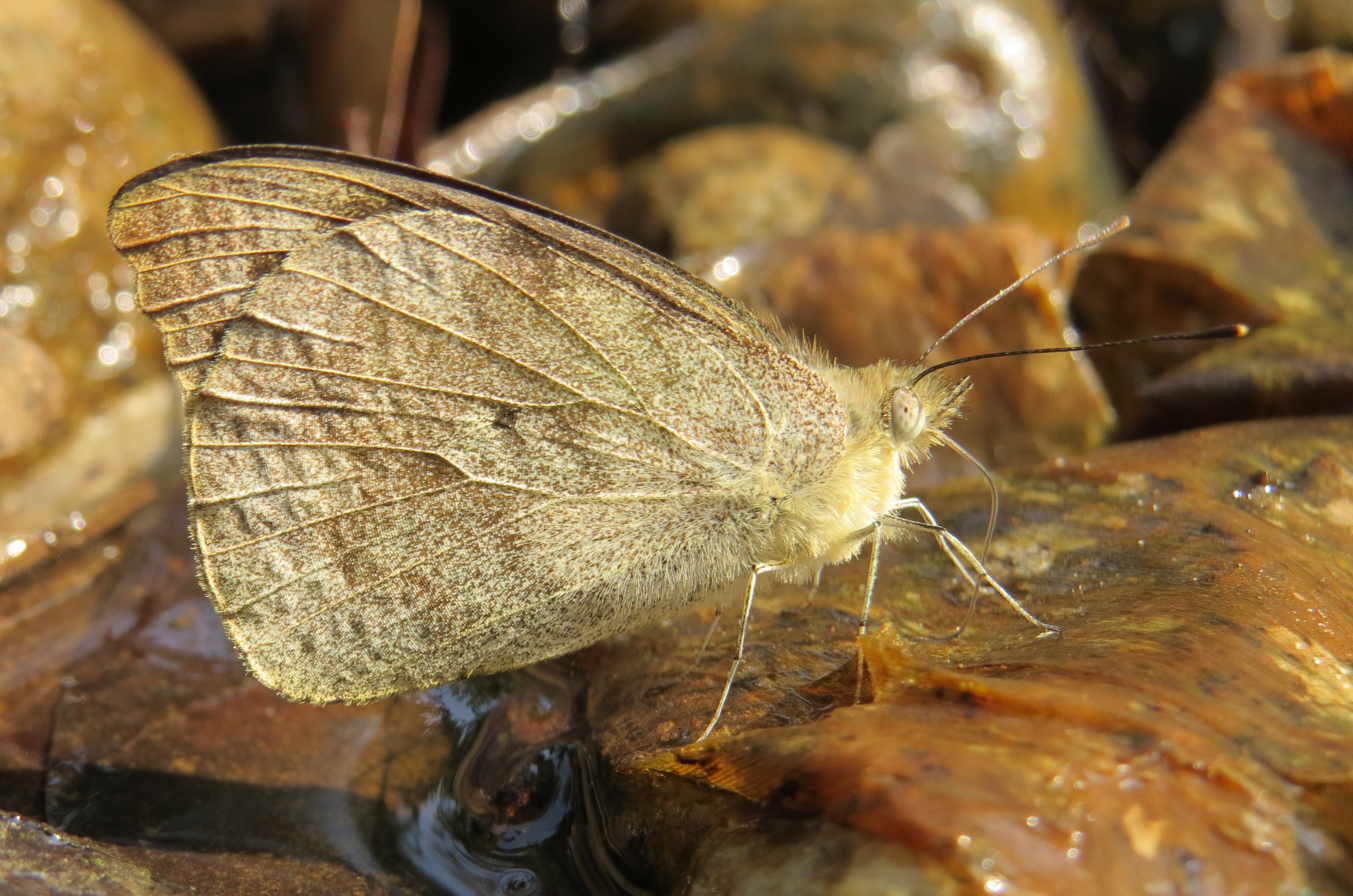
Ventral view

===== Appias lalage (spot puffin) =====
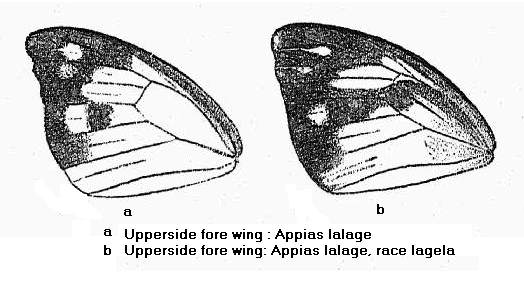
Dorsal view

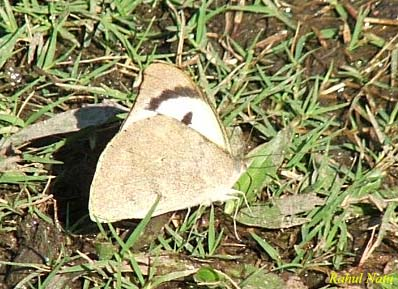
Ventral view

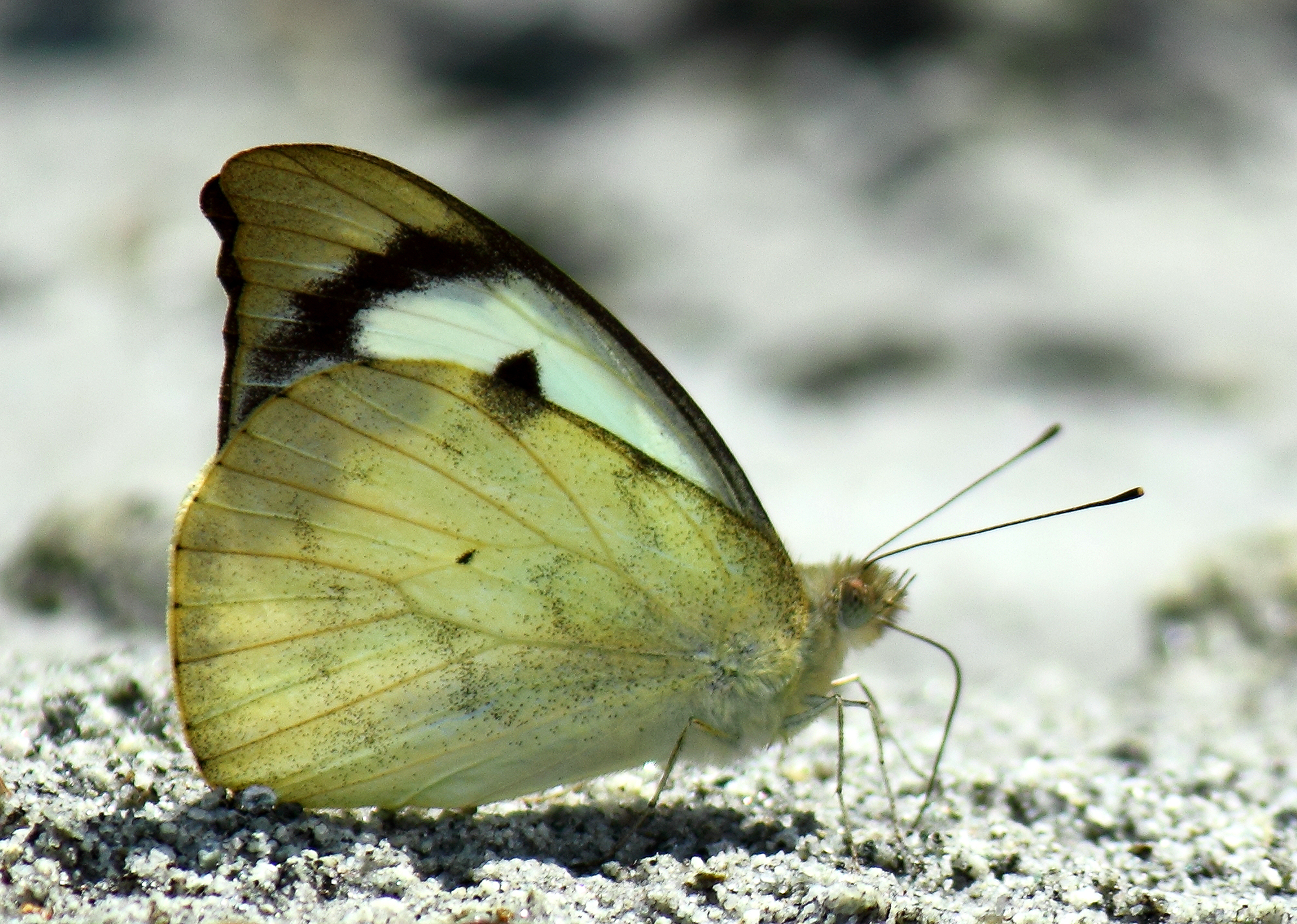
Ventral view

===== Appias libythea (striped albatross) =====
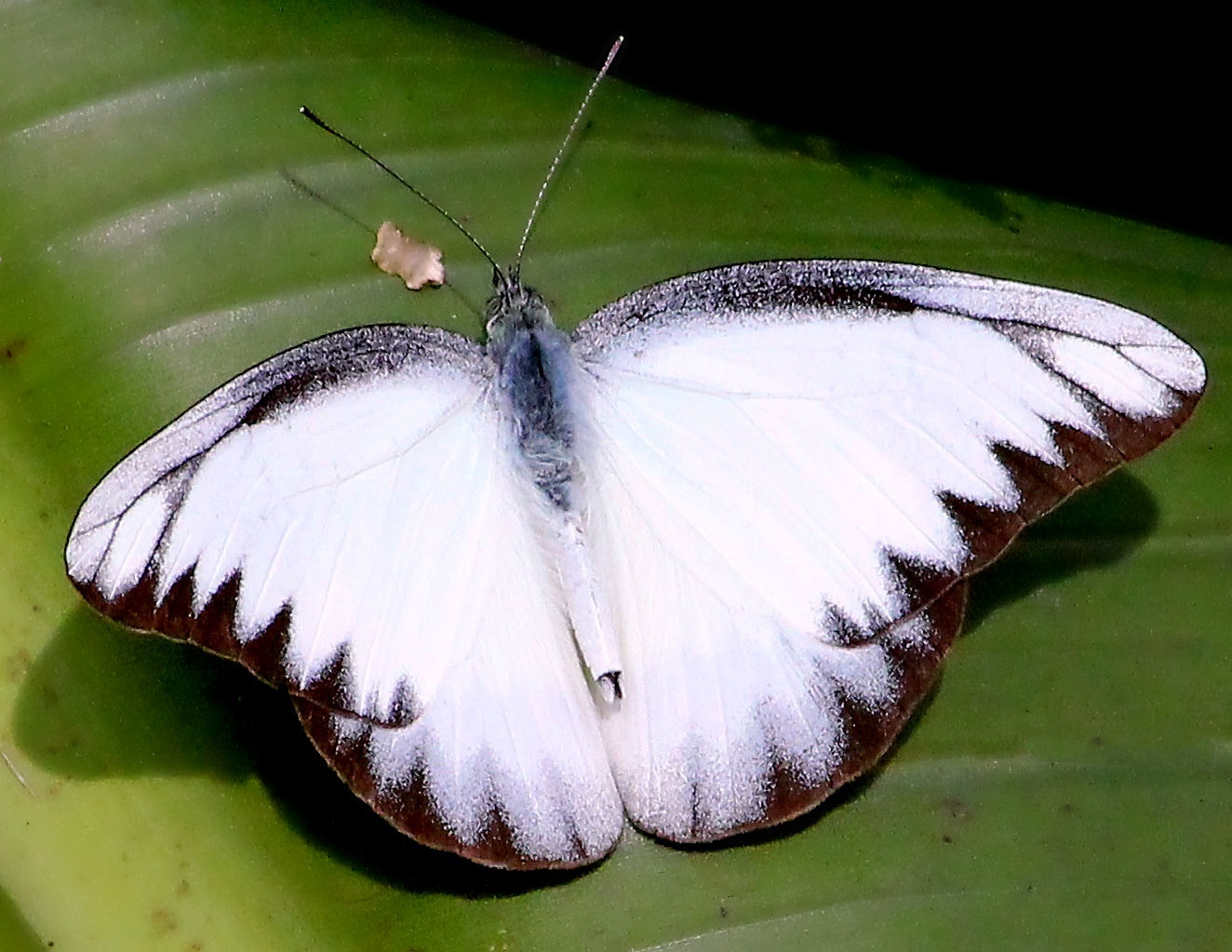
Dorsal view

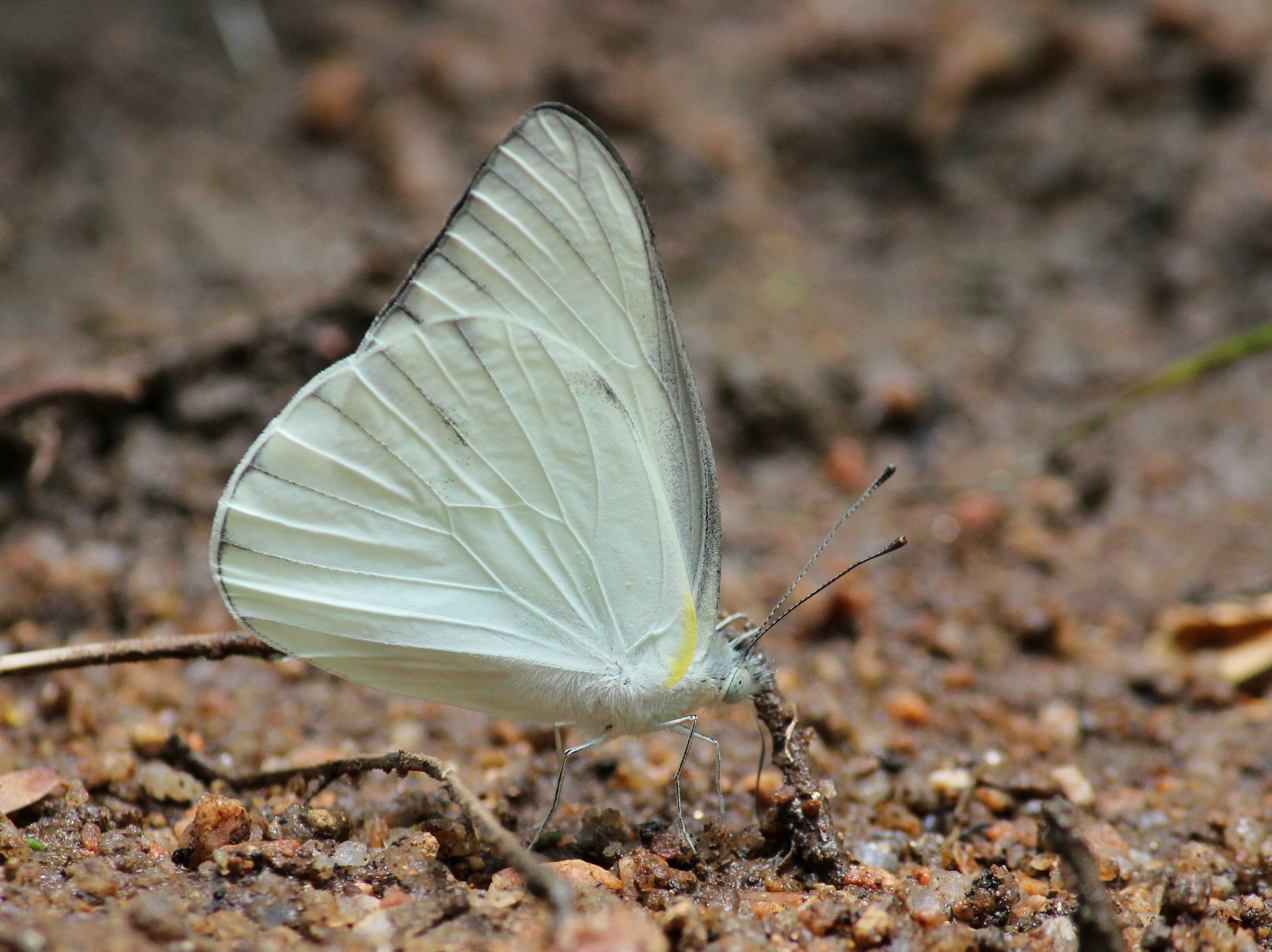
Ventral view (male)

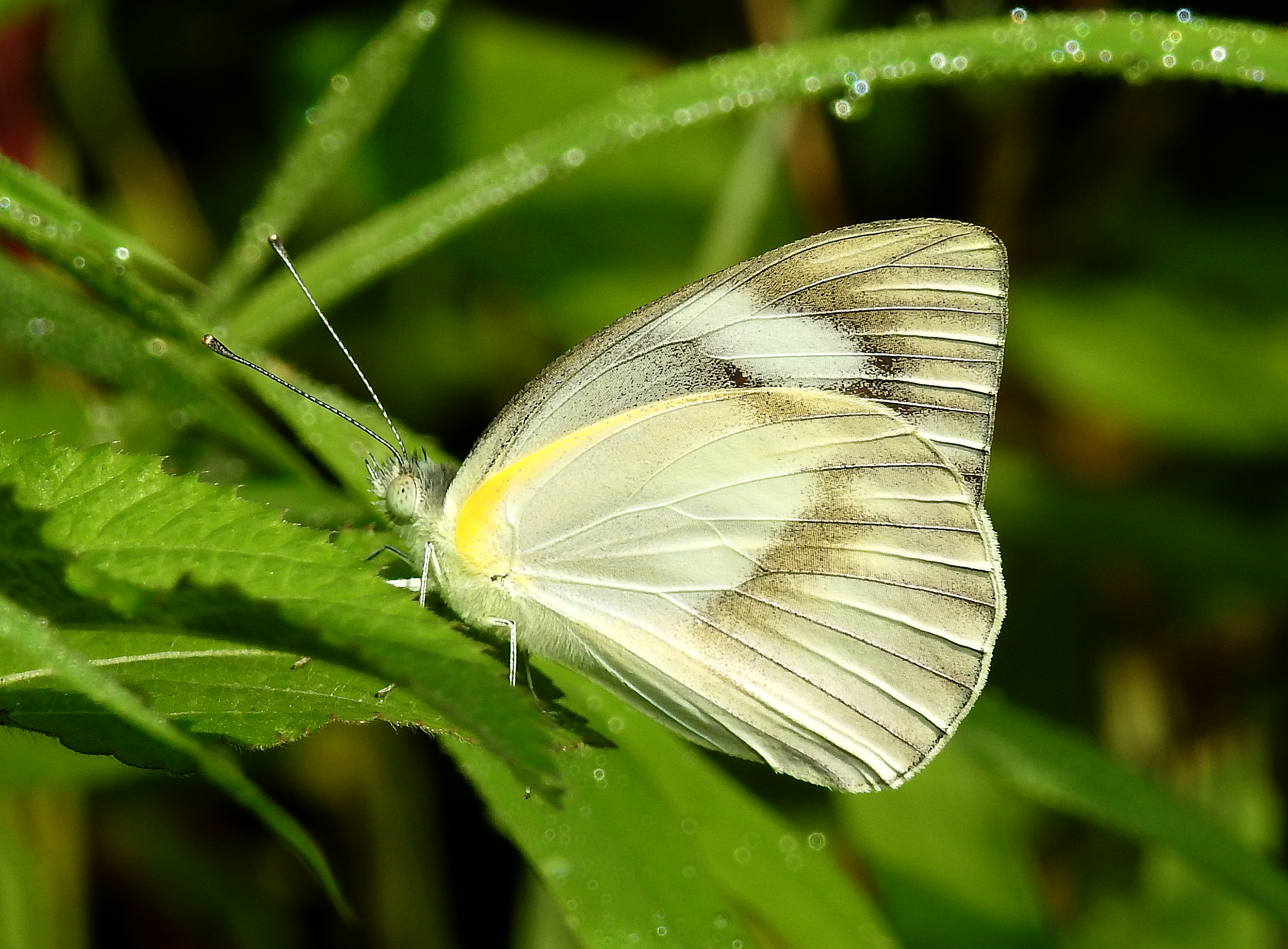
Ventral view (female)

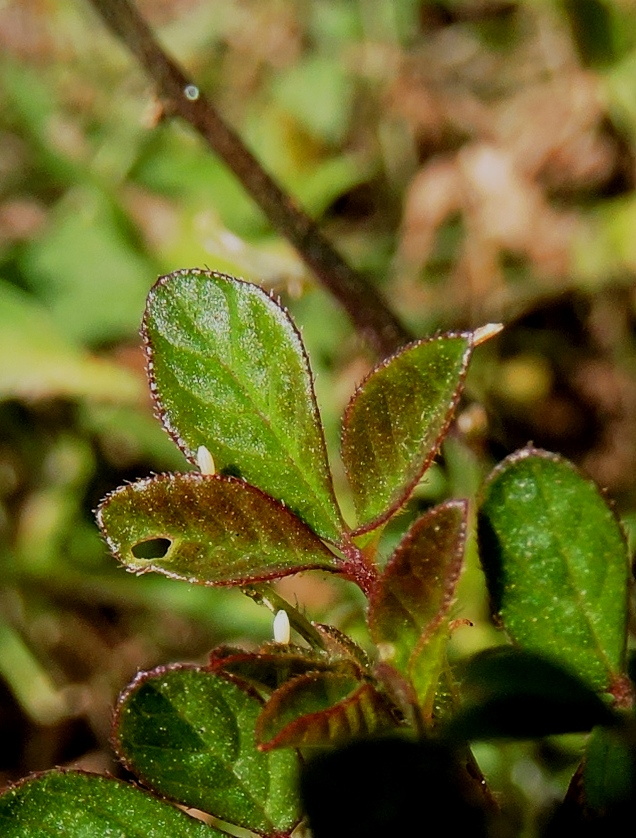
Eggs

===== Appias lyncida (chocolate albatross) =====
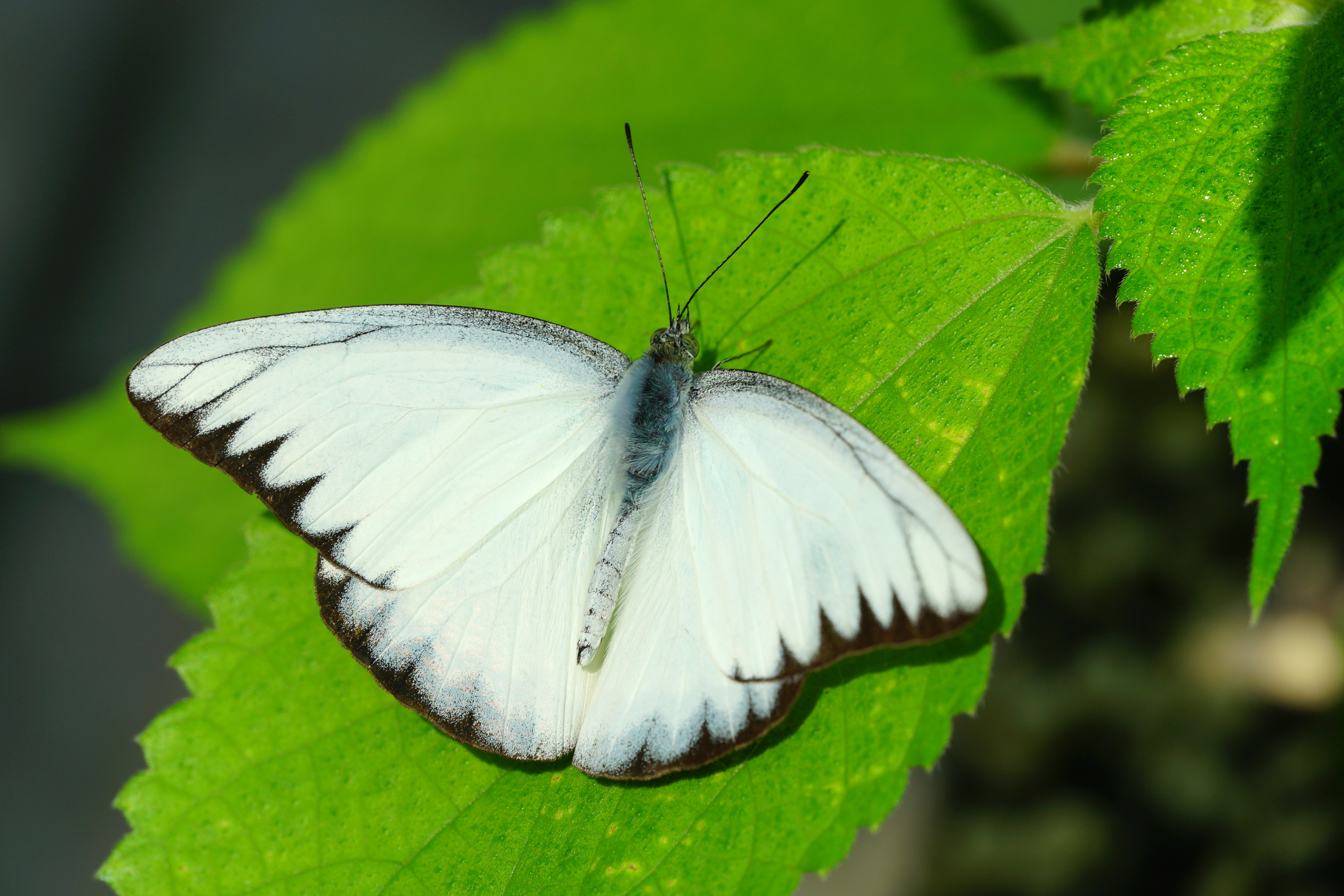
Dorsal view

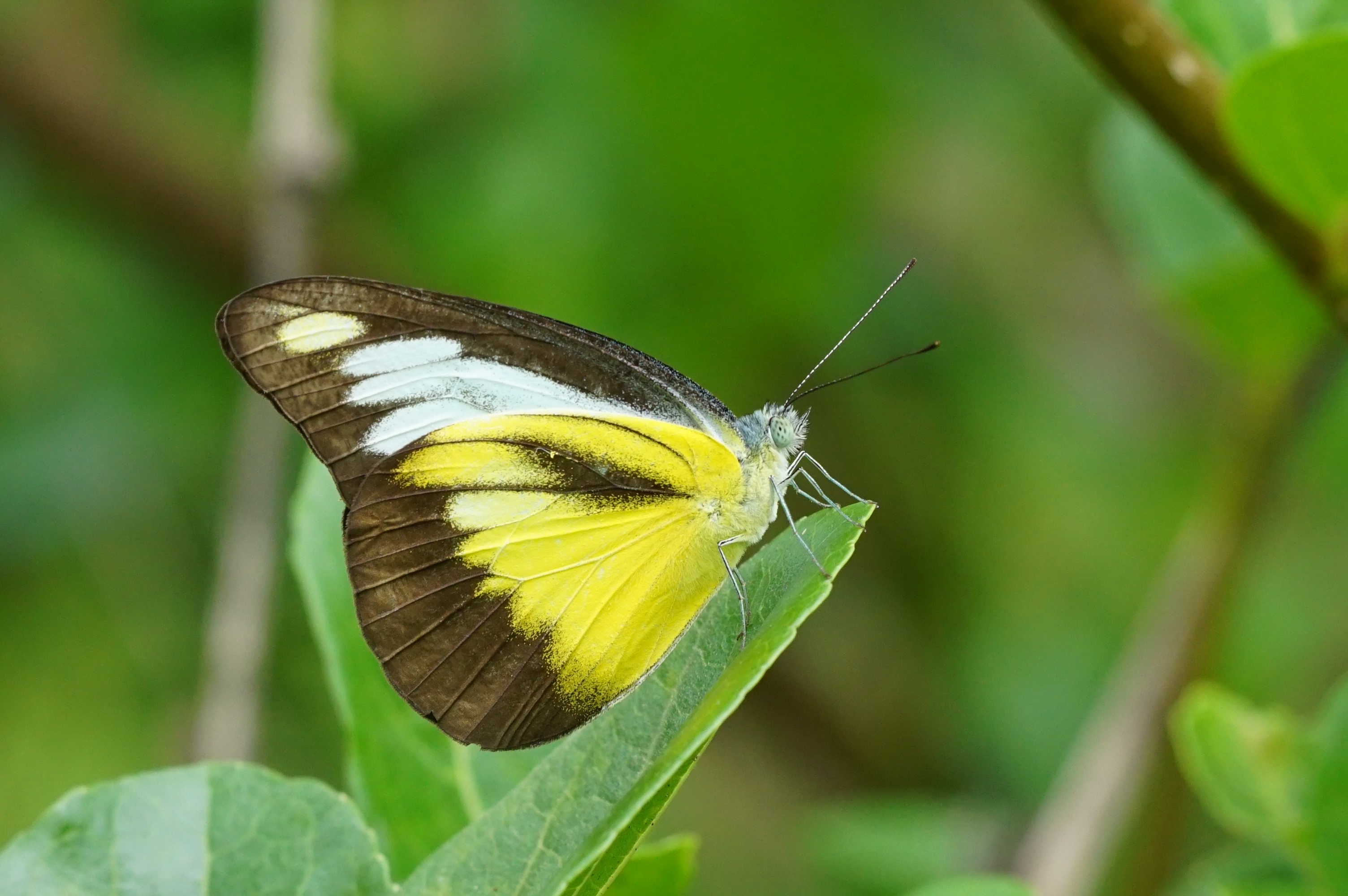
Ventral view

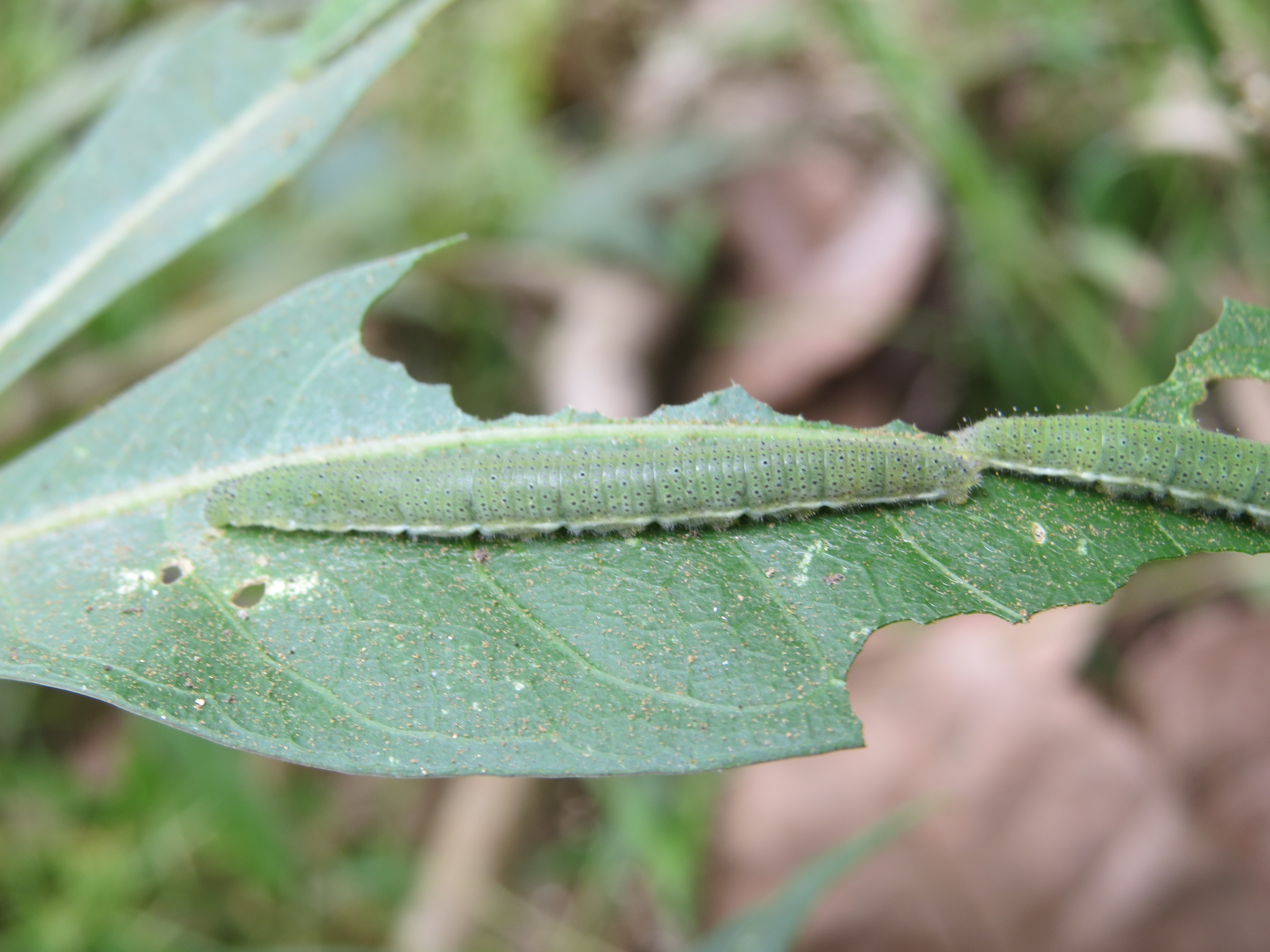
Larva

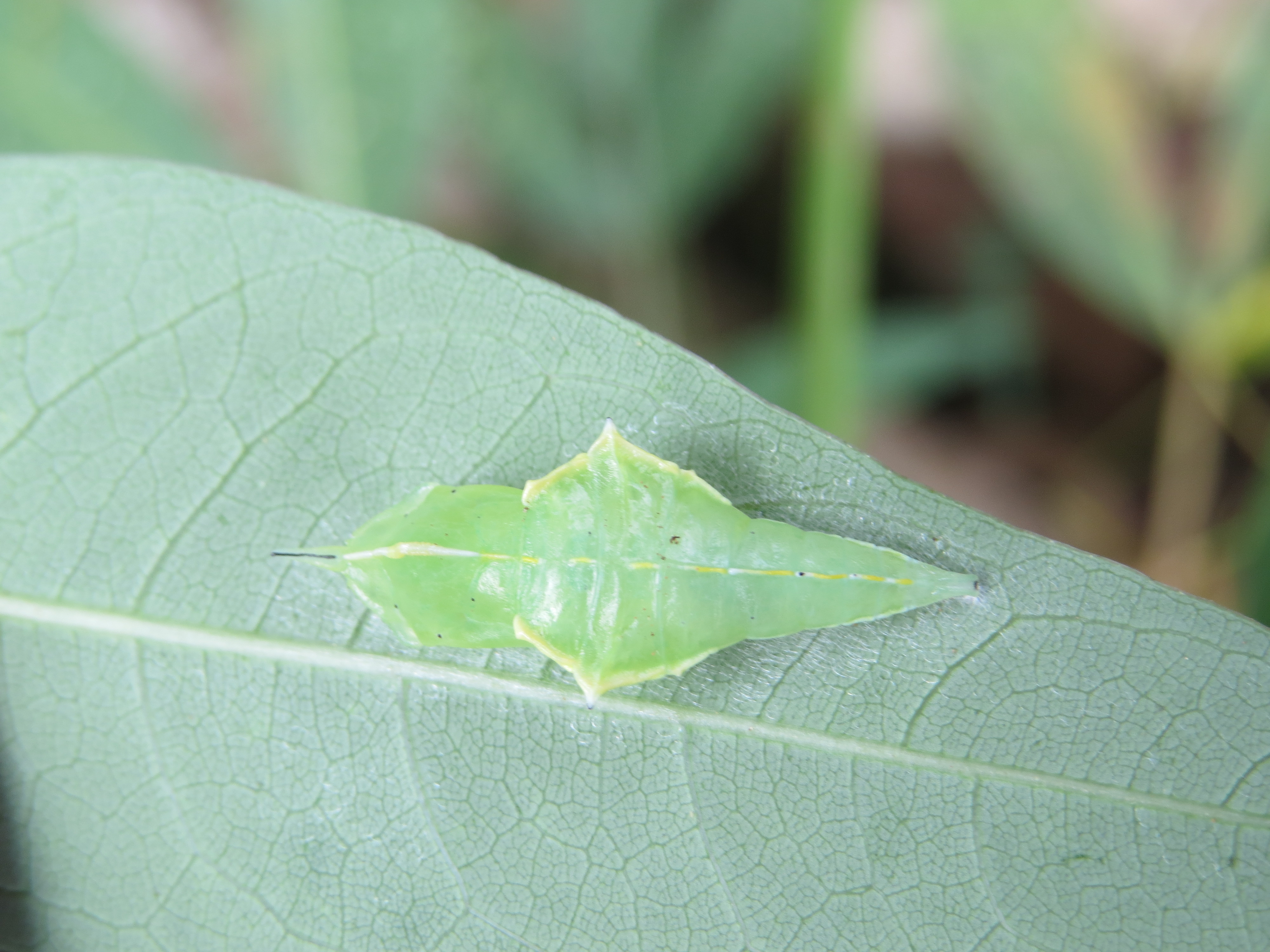
Pupa

===== Appias wardii (Indian / Ward's albatross) =====
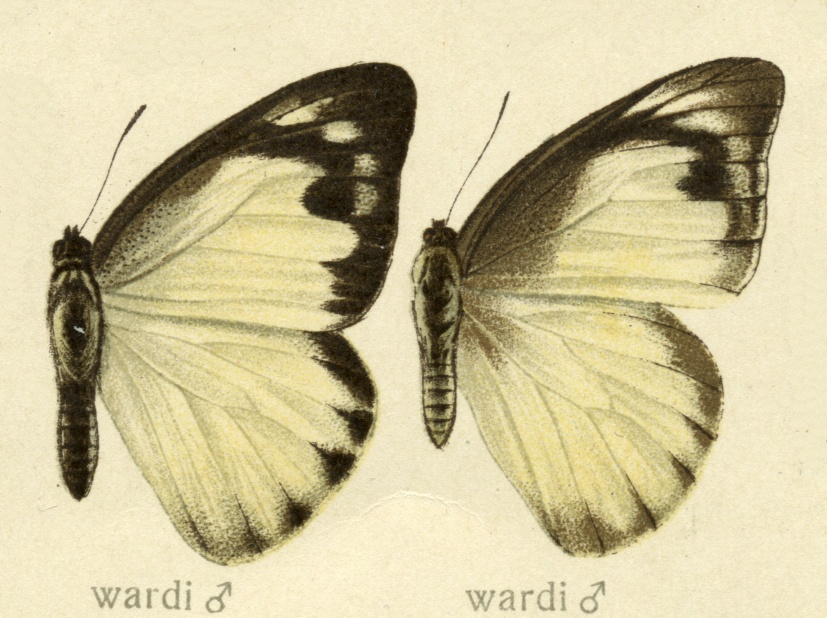
Dorsal view

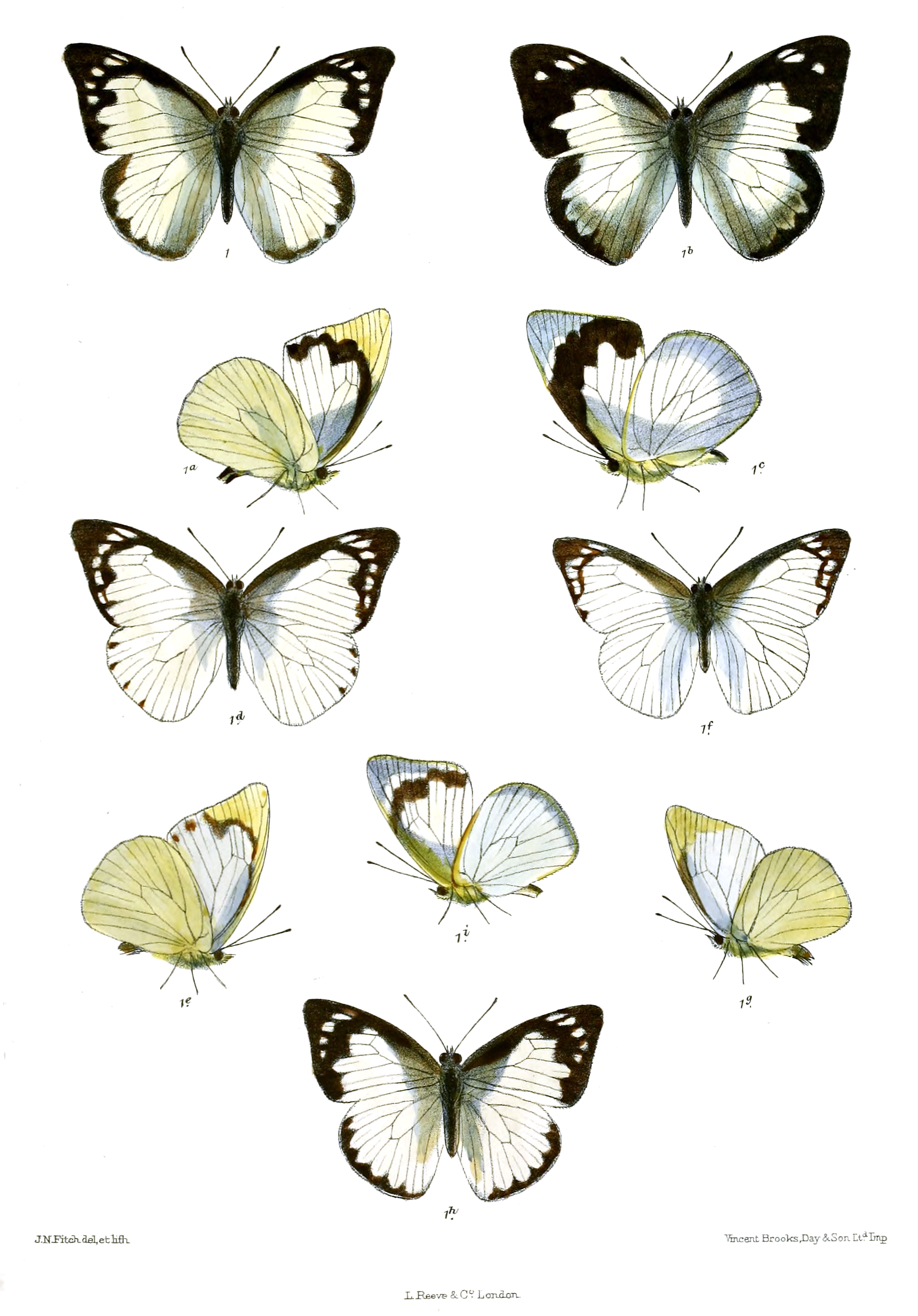
Ventral view

==== Genus: Belenois (pioneers) ====
===== Belenois aurota (pioneer) =====
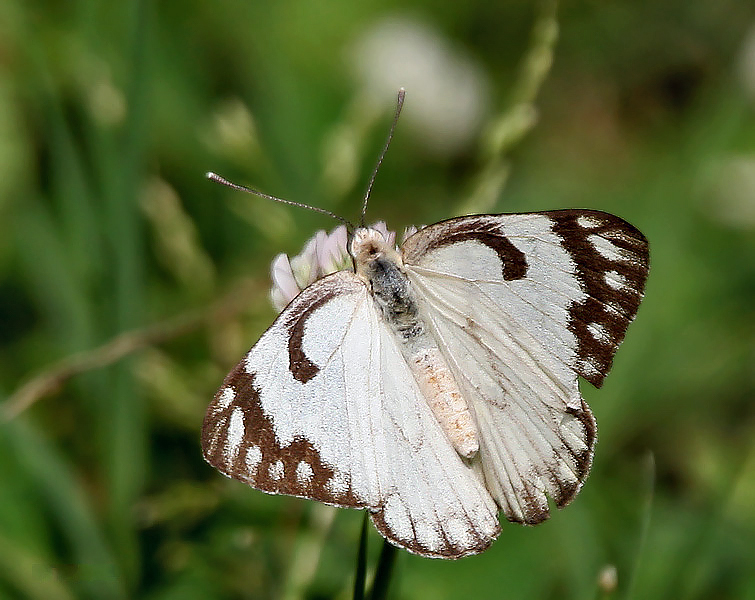
Dorsal view

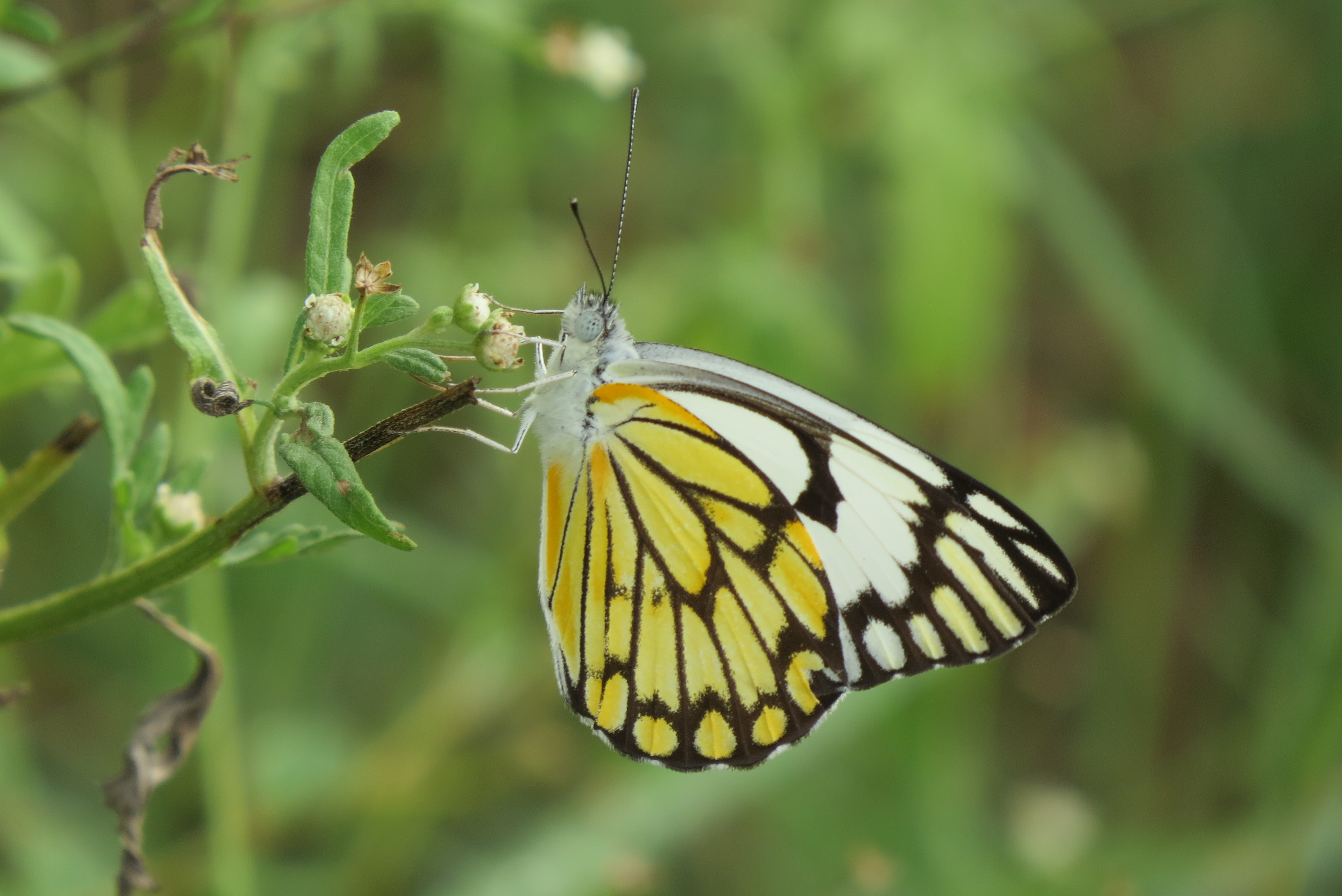
Ventral view

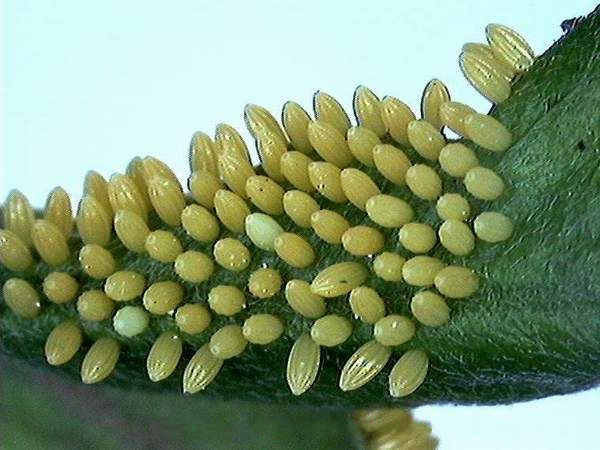
Eggs

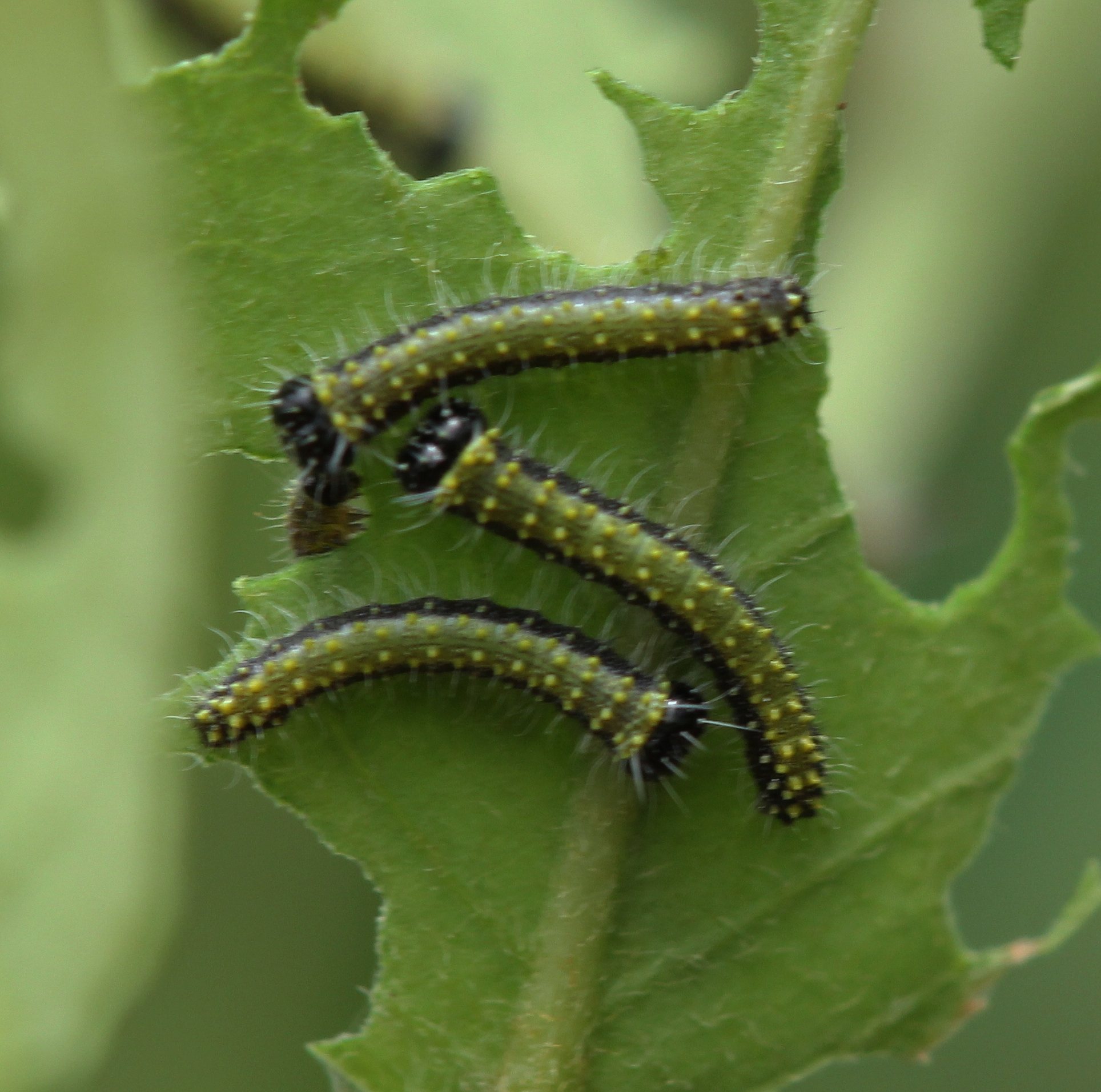
Larva

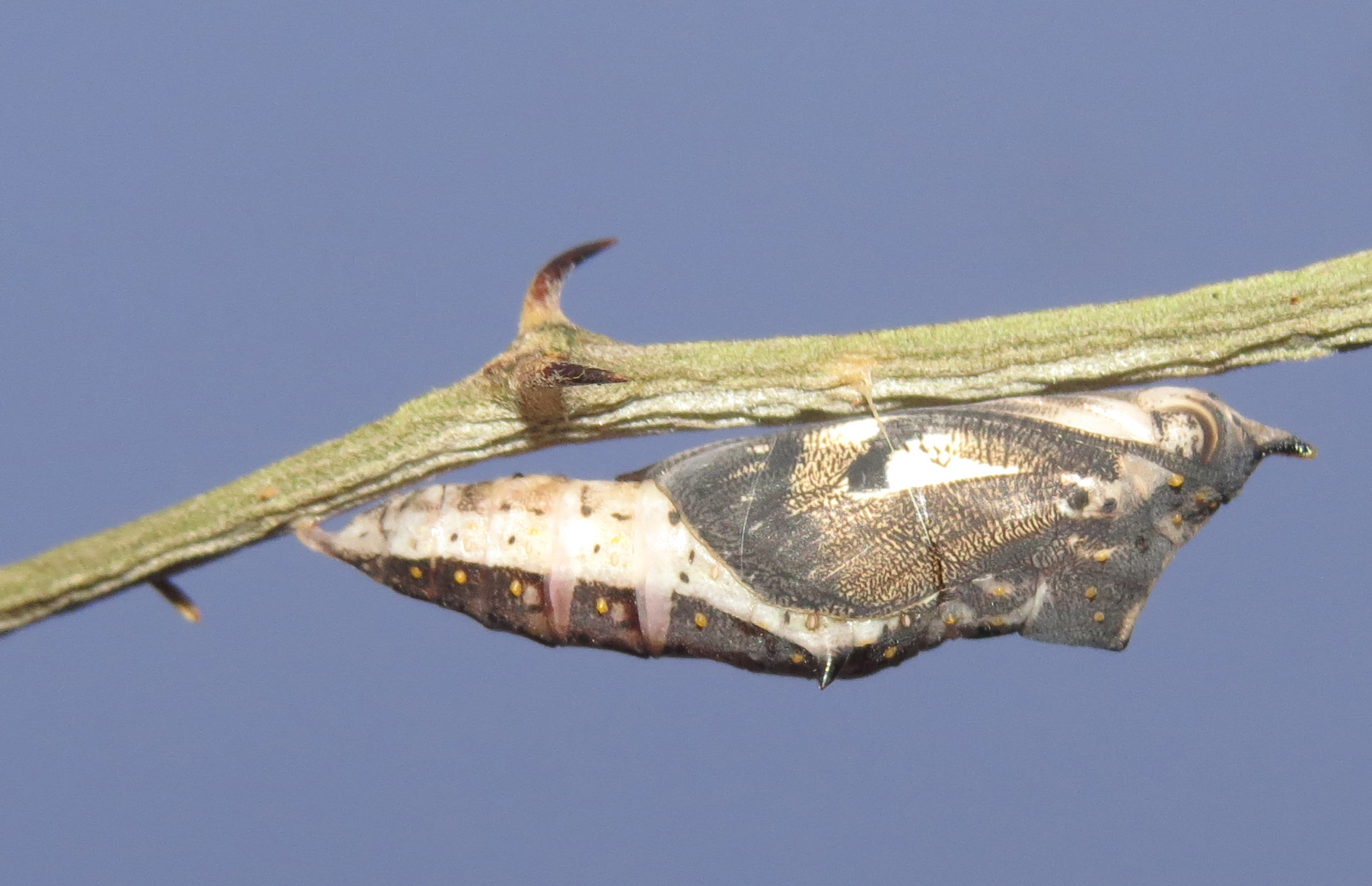
Pupa

==== Genus: Cepora (gulls) ====
===== Cepora nadina (lesser gull) =====
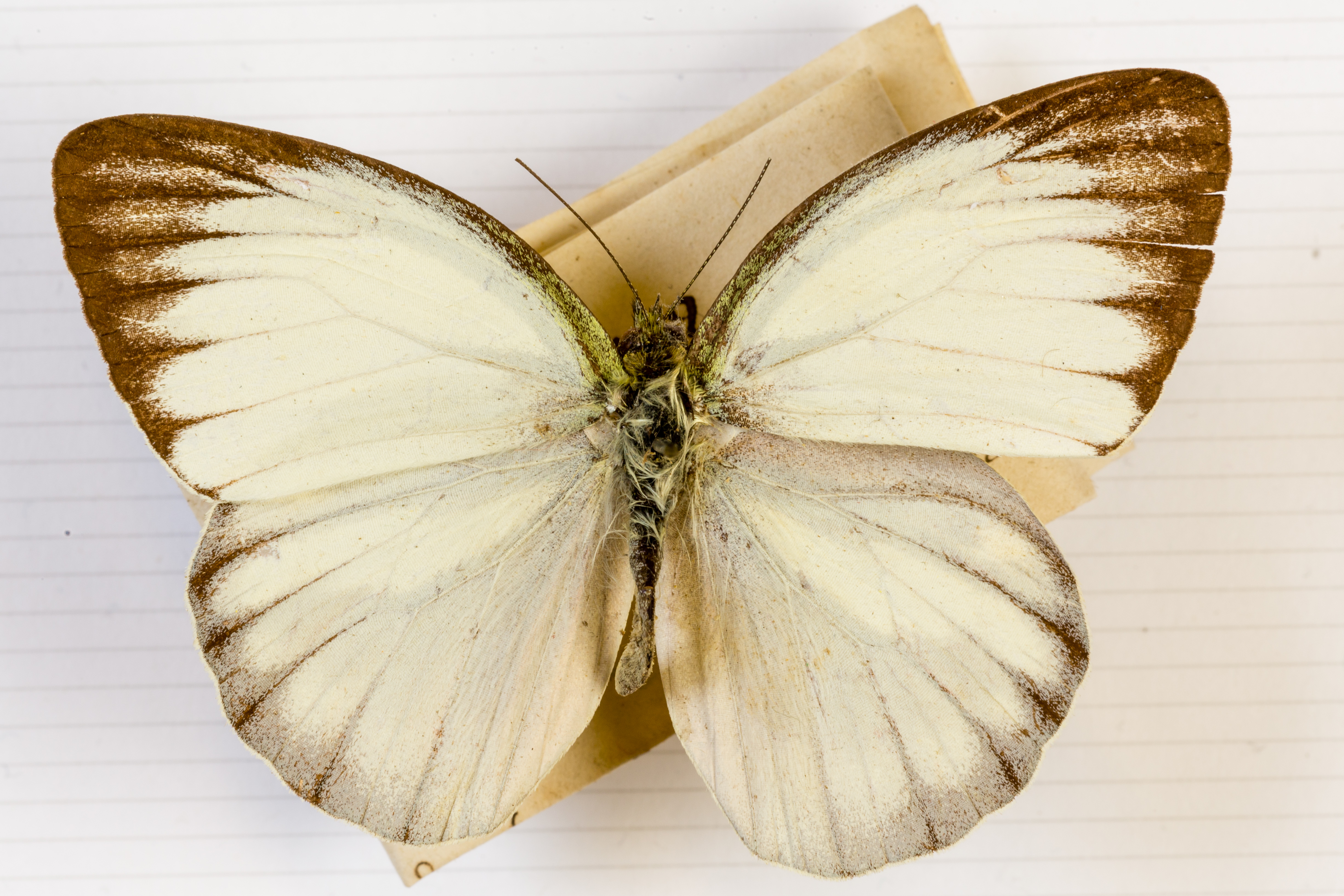
Dorsal view

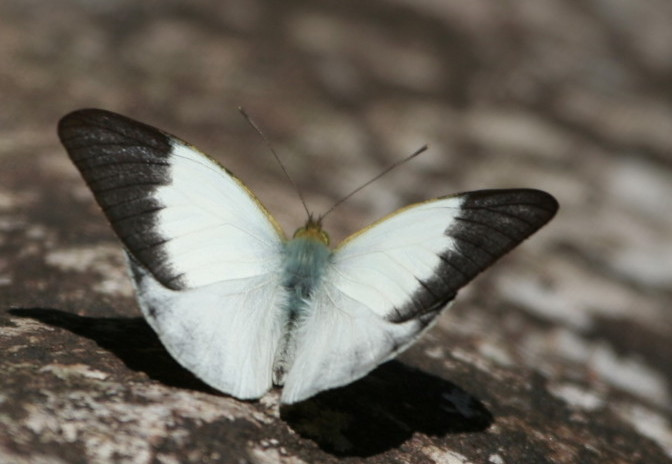
Dorsal view

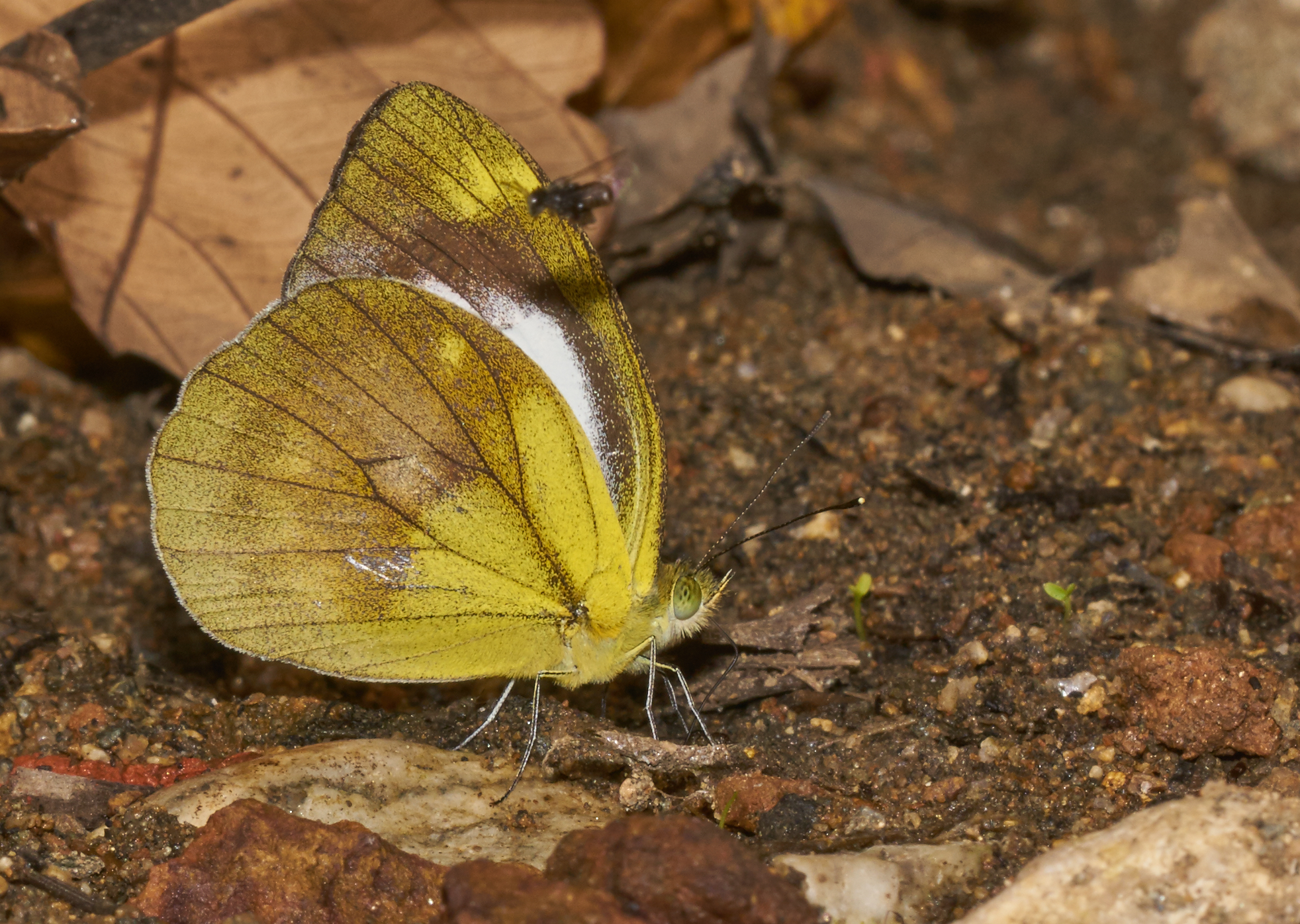
Ventral view

===== Cepora nerissa (common gull) =====
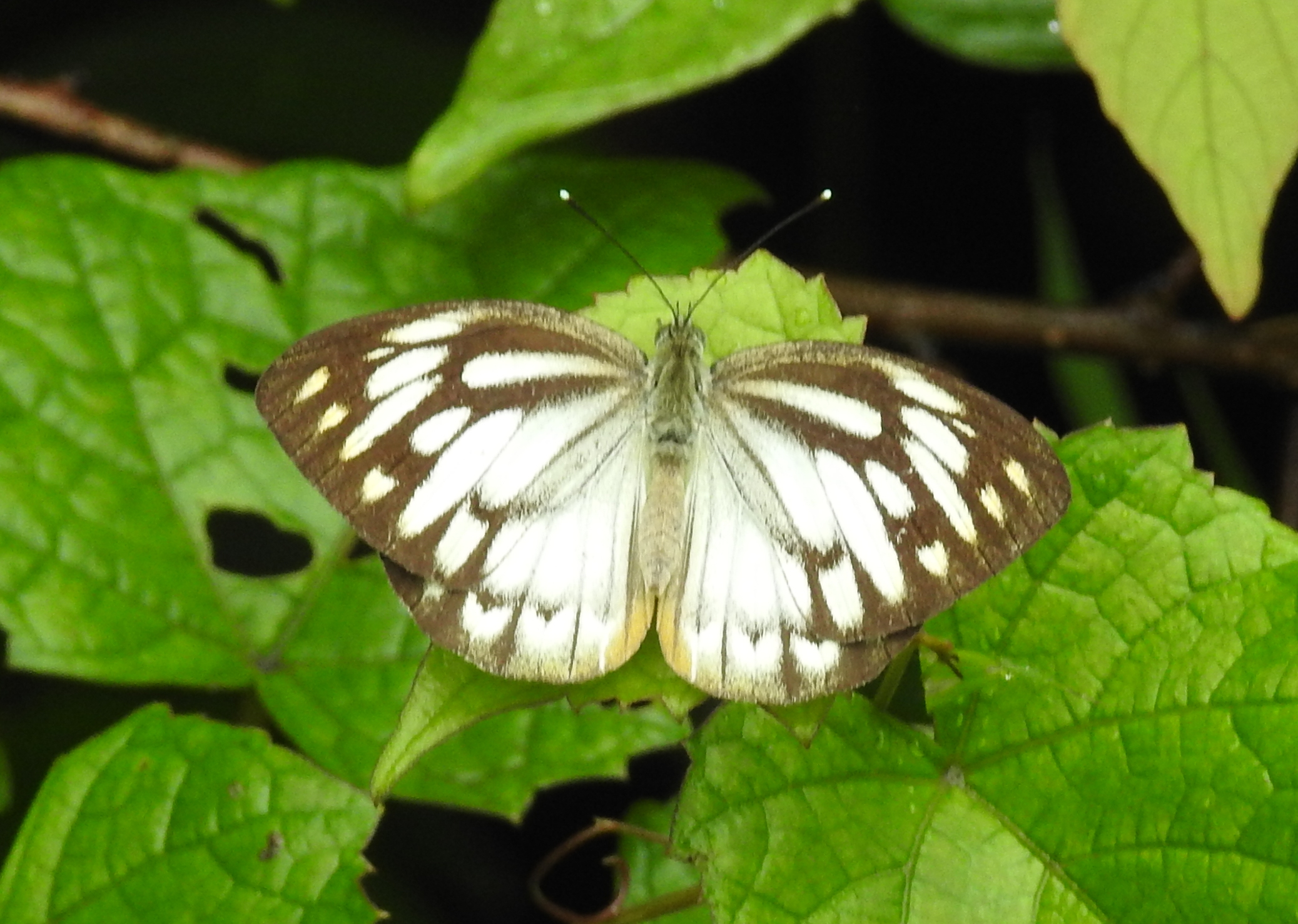
Dorsal view

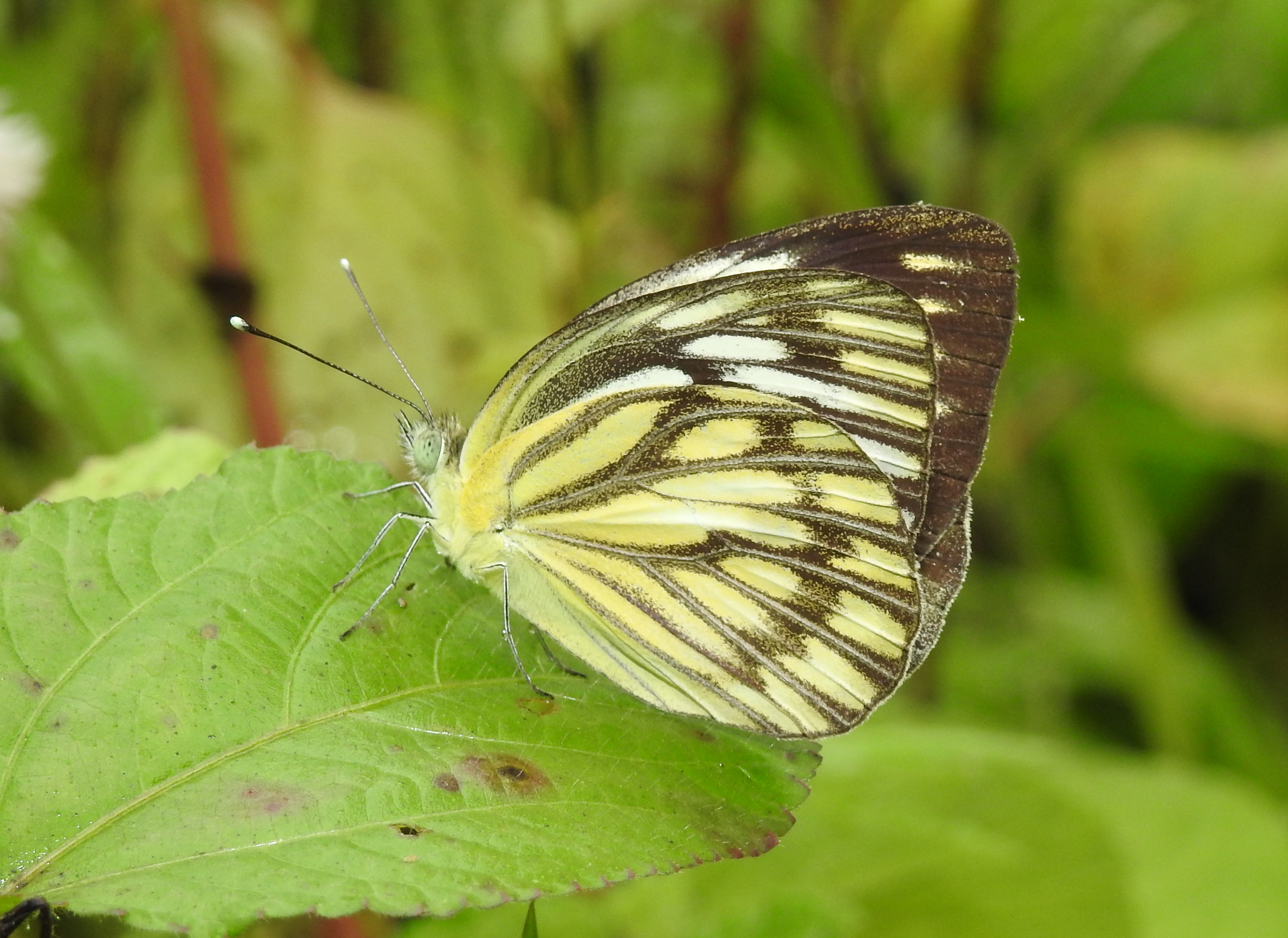
Ventral view

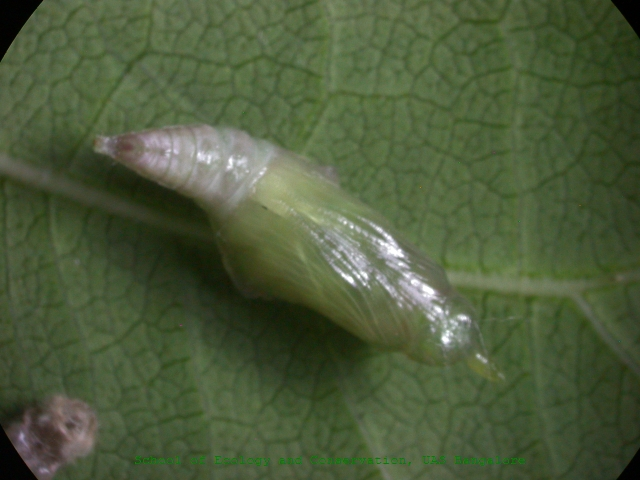
Pupa

==== Genus: Colotis (Arabs) ====
===== Colotis amata (small salmon Arab) =====
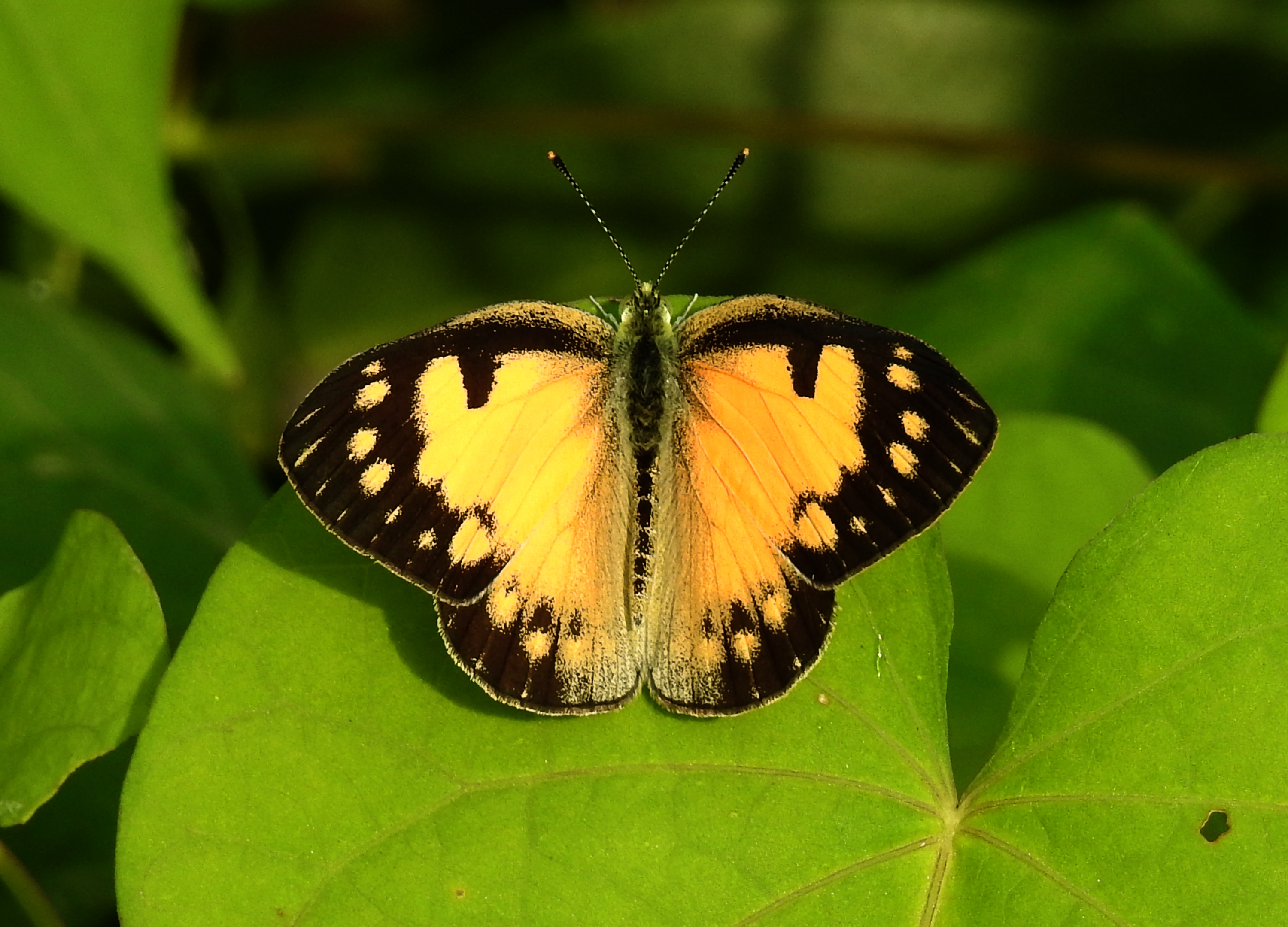
Dorsal view

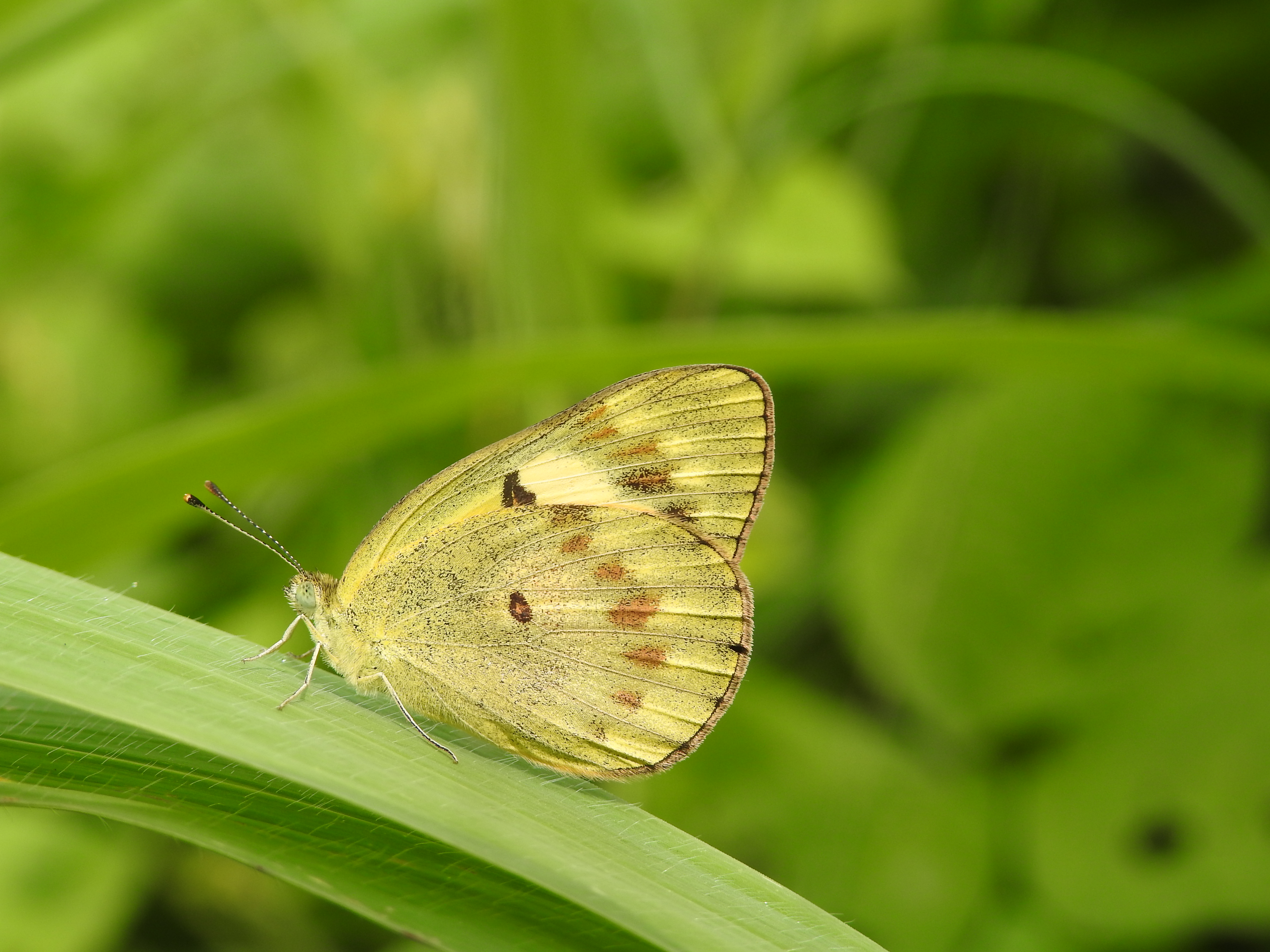
Ventral view

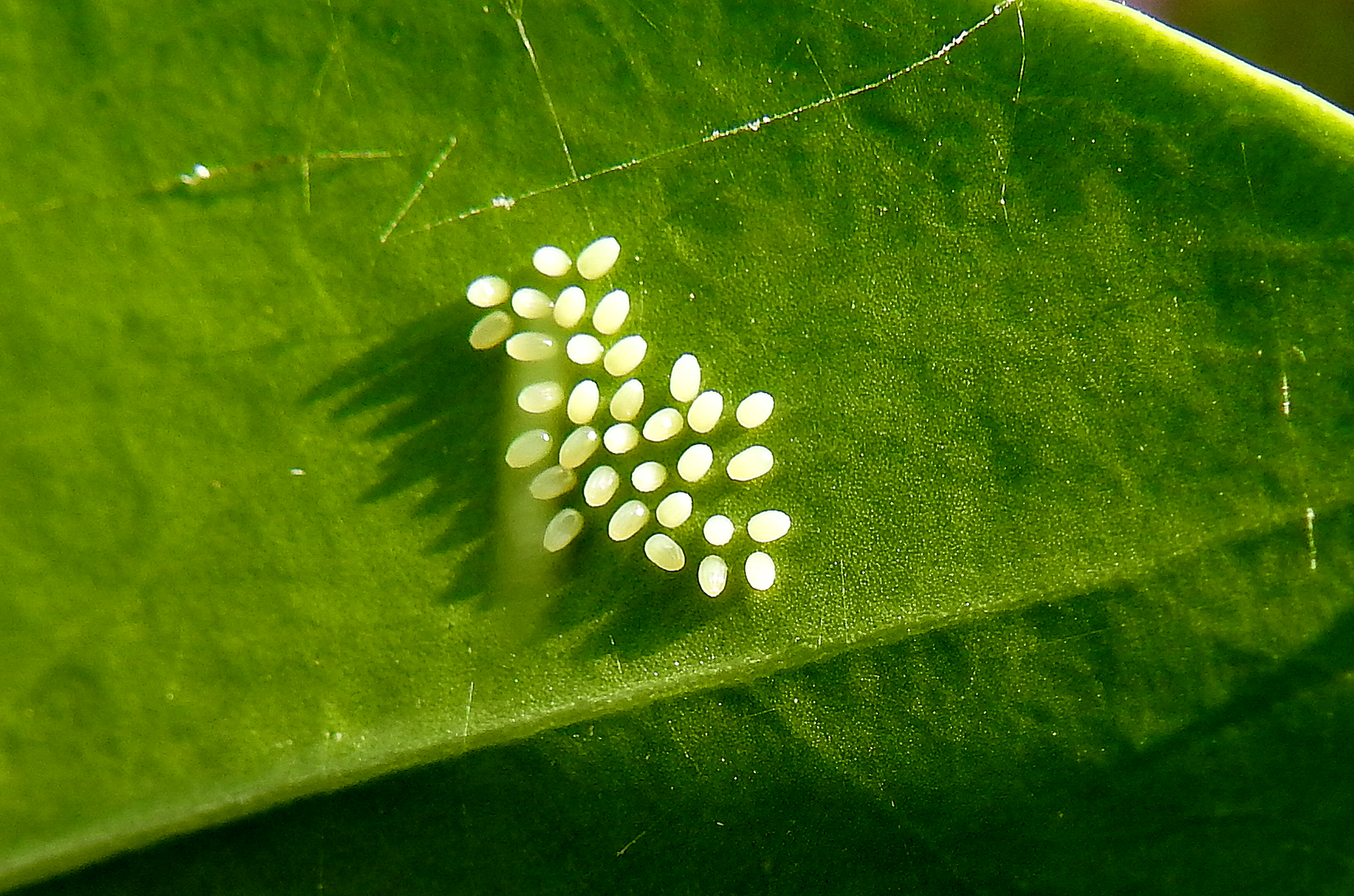
Eggs

===== Colotis aurora (plain orange-tip) =====
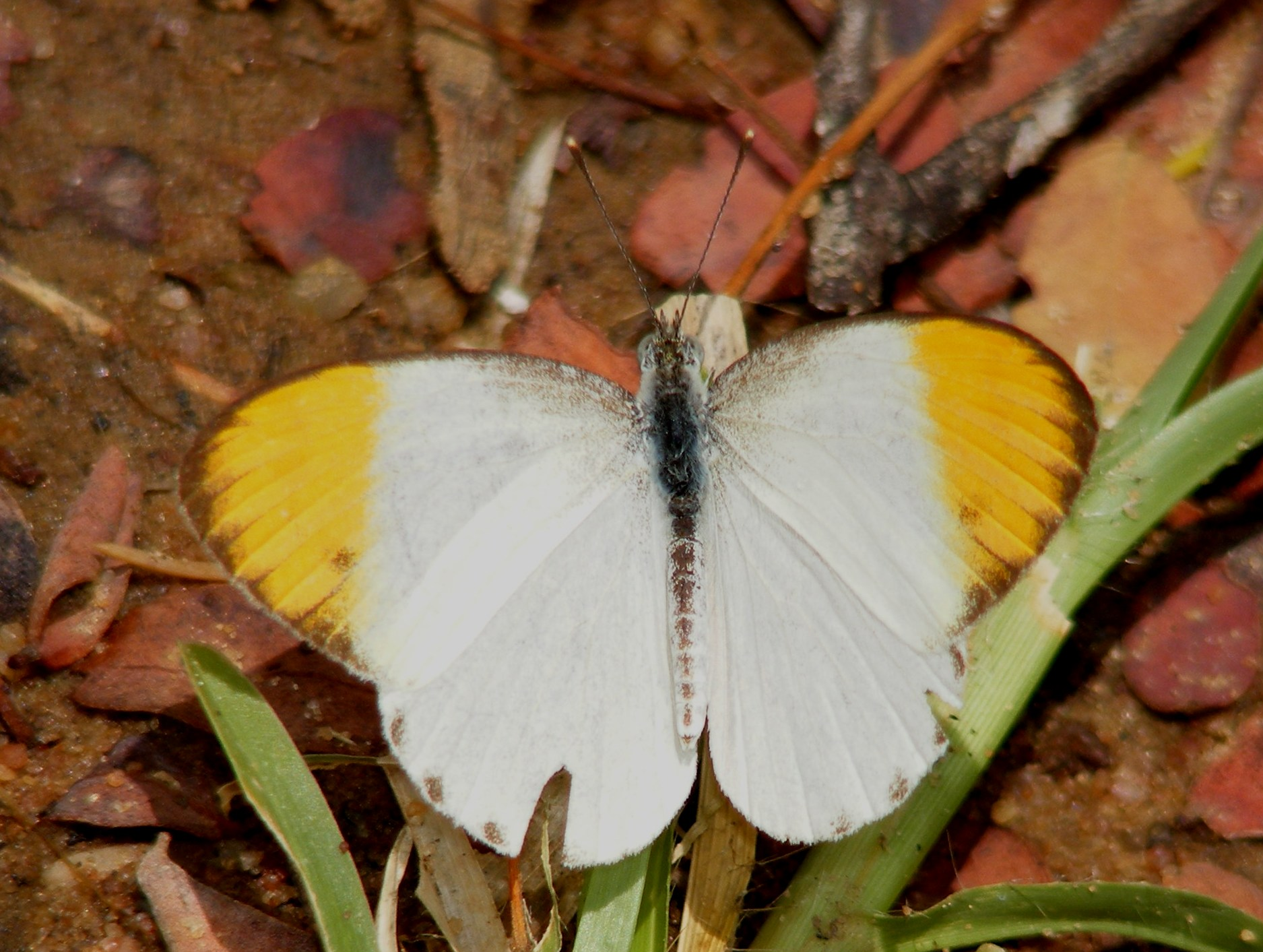
Dorsal view (male)

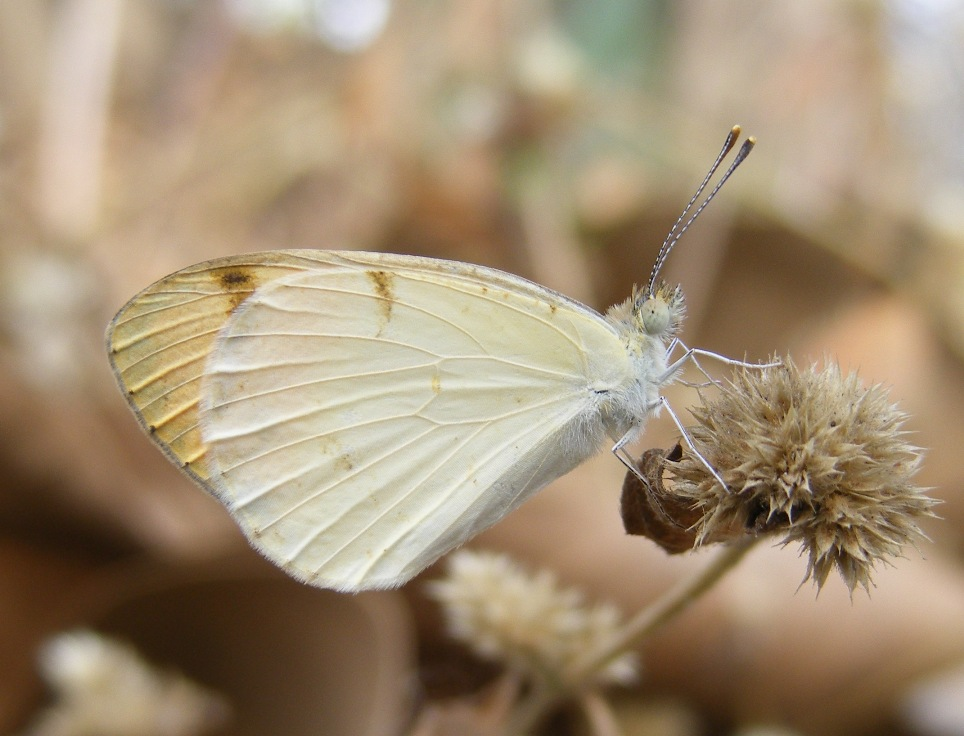
Ventral view (male)

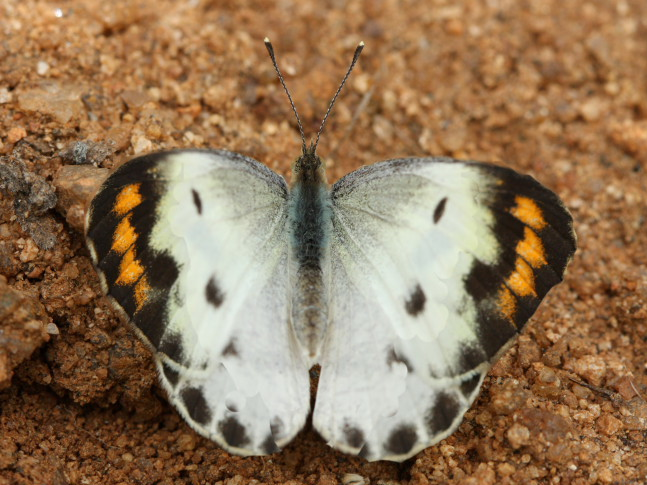
Dorsal view (female)

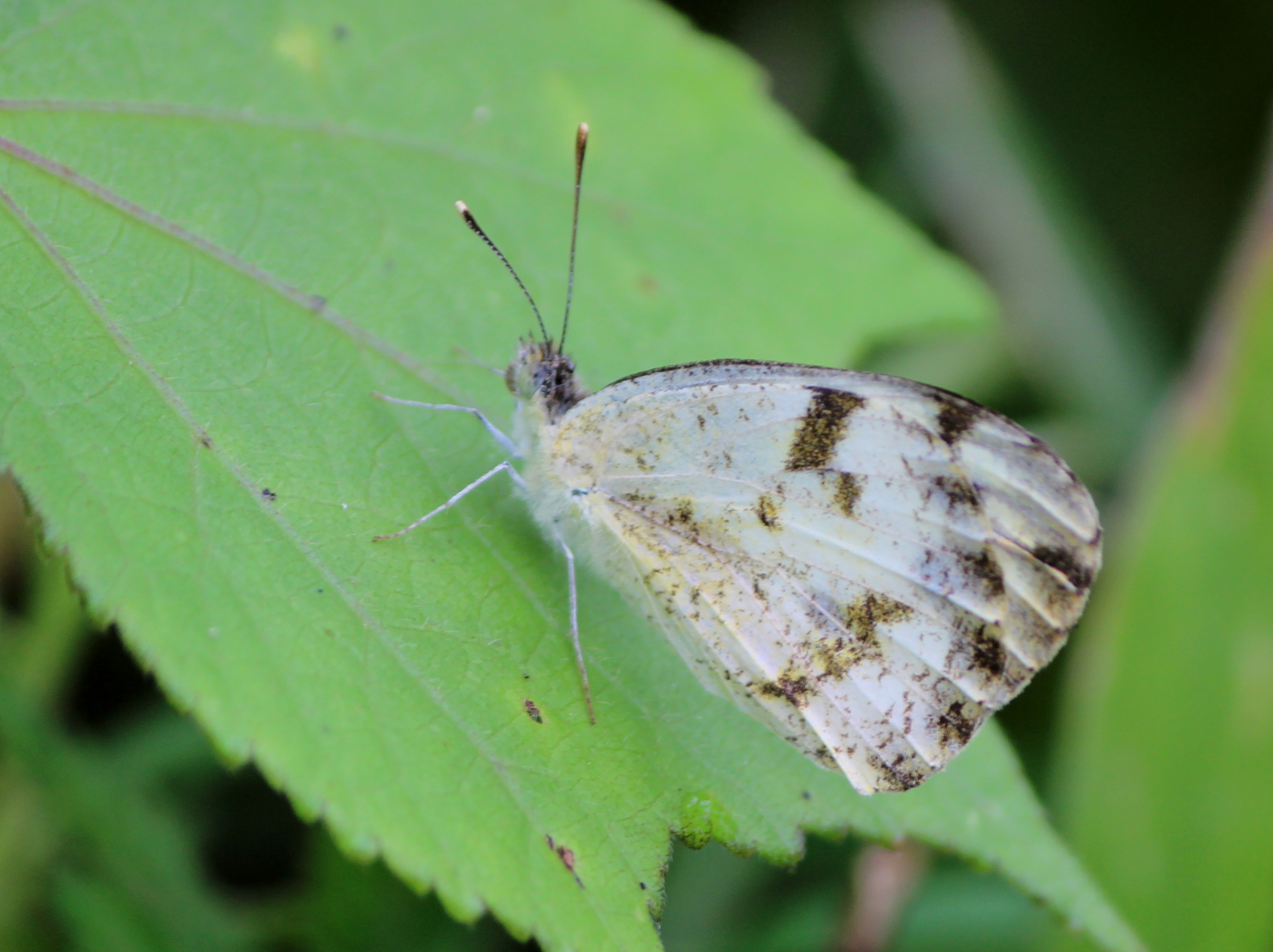
Ventral view (female)

===== Colotis danae (crimson-tip) =====
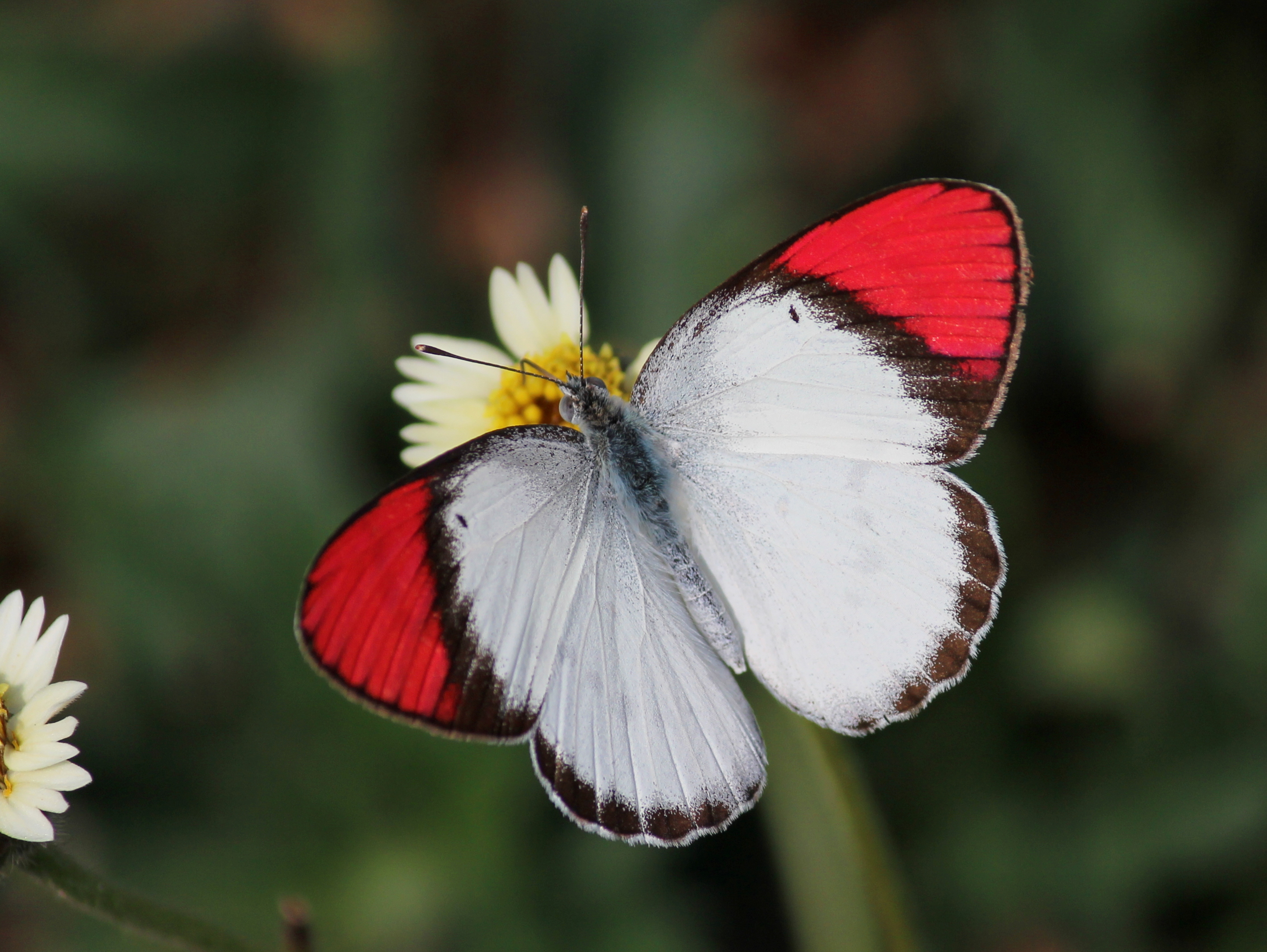
Dorsal view (male)

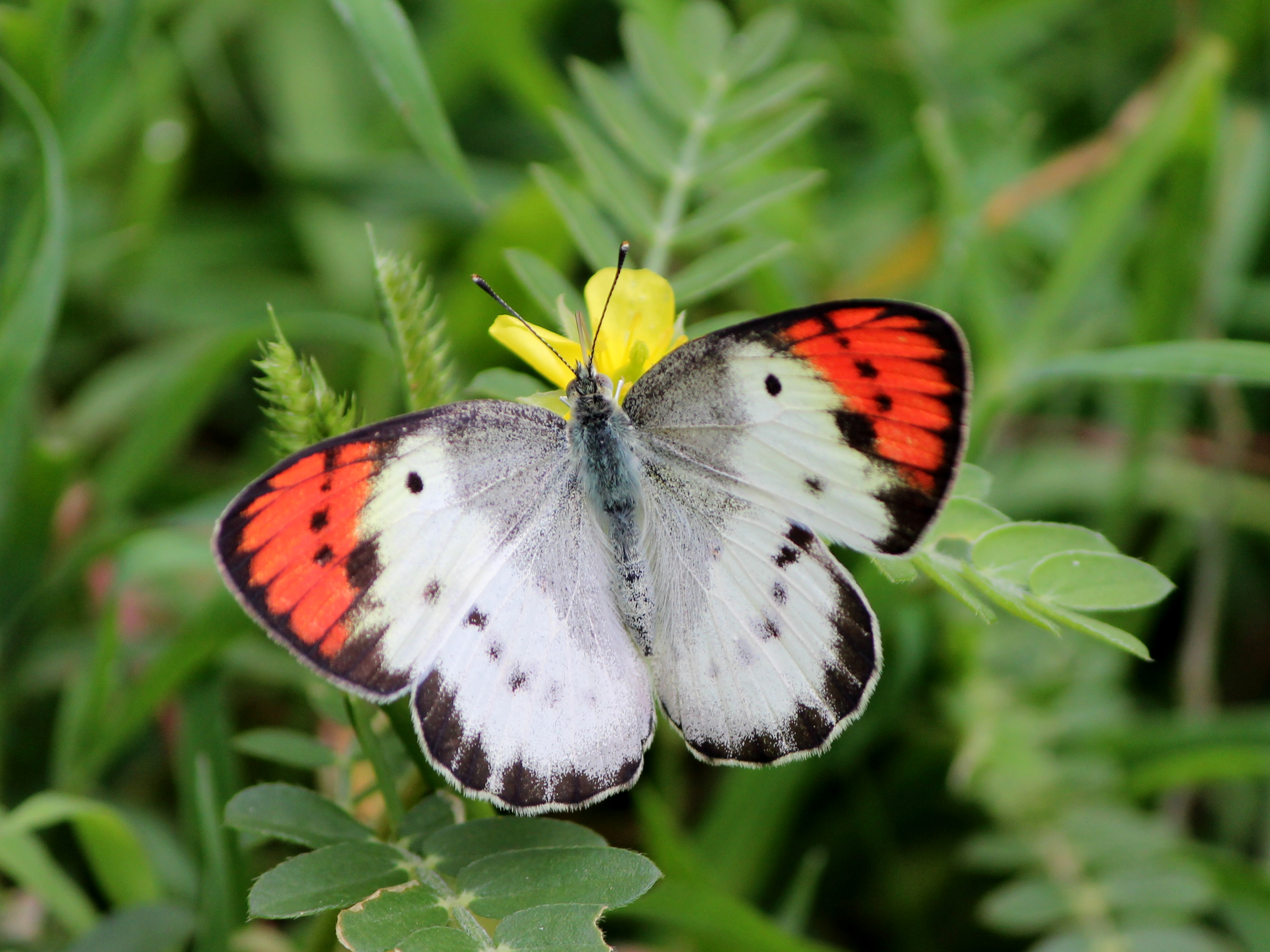
Dorsal view (female)

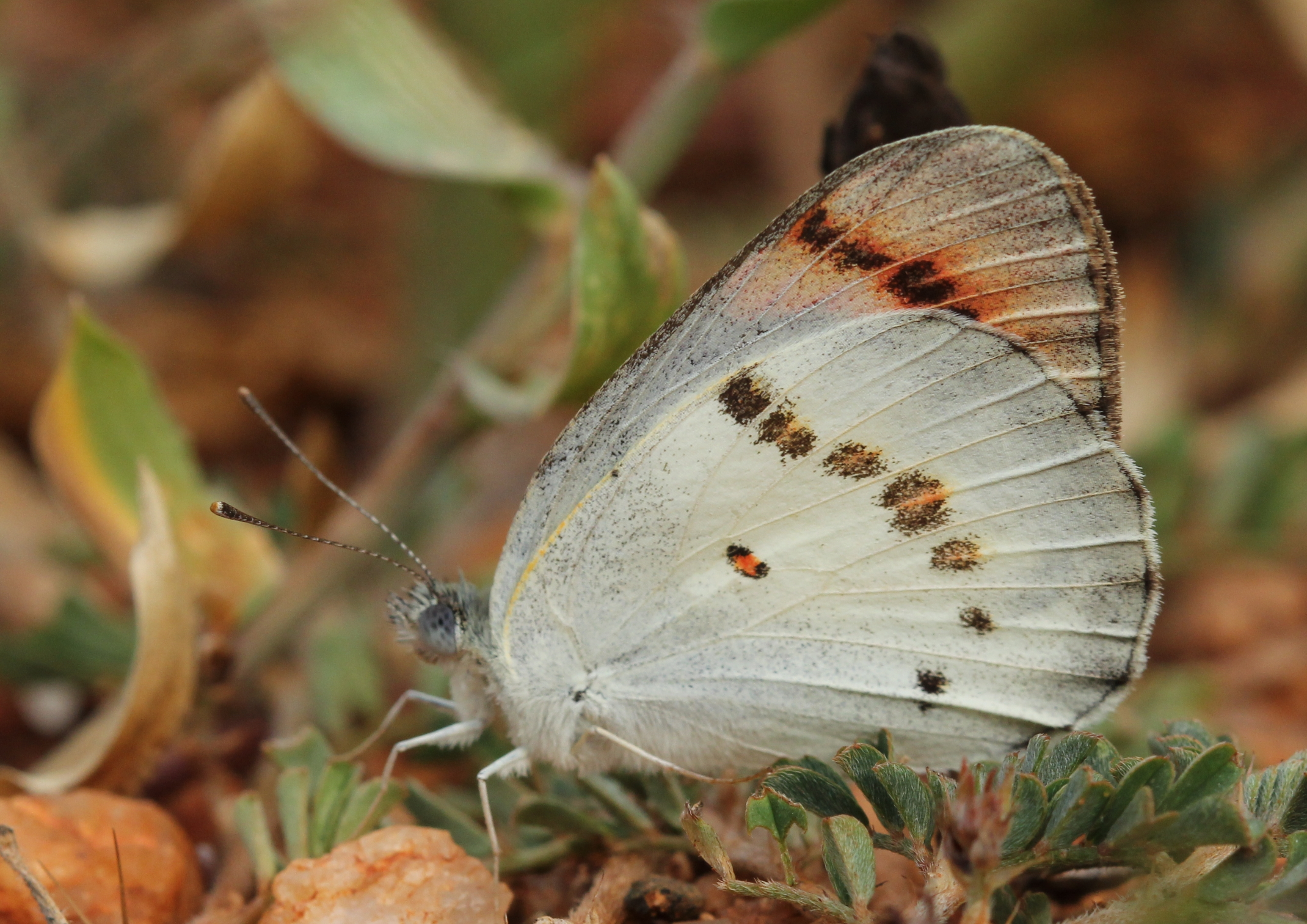
Ventral view

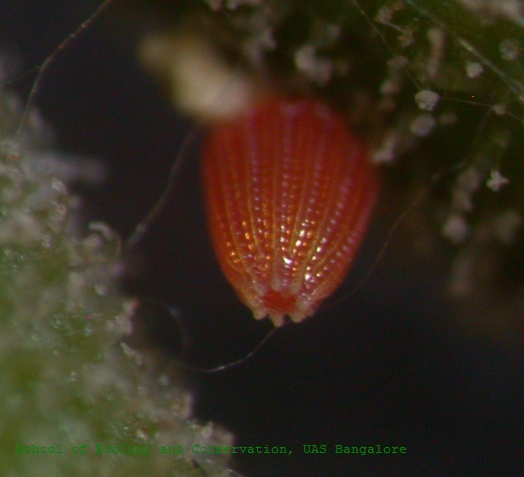
Eggs

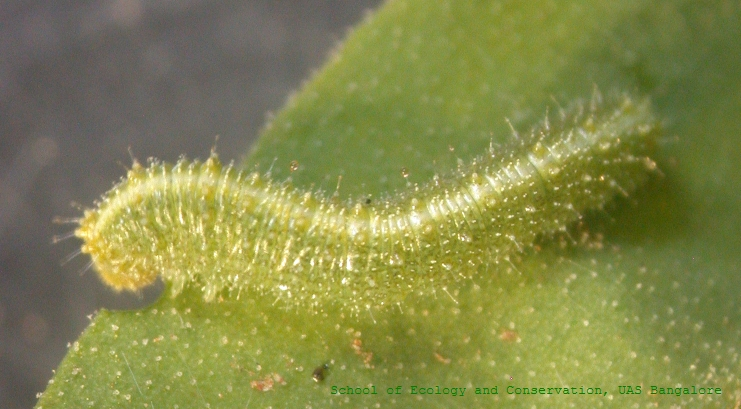
Larva

===== Colotis etrida (little orange-tip) =====
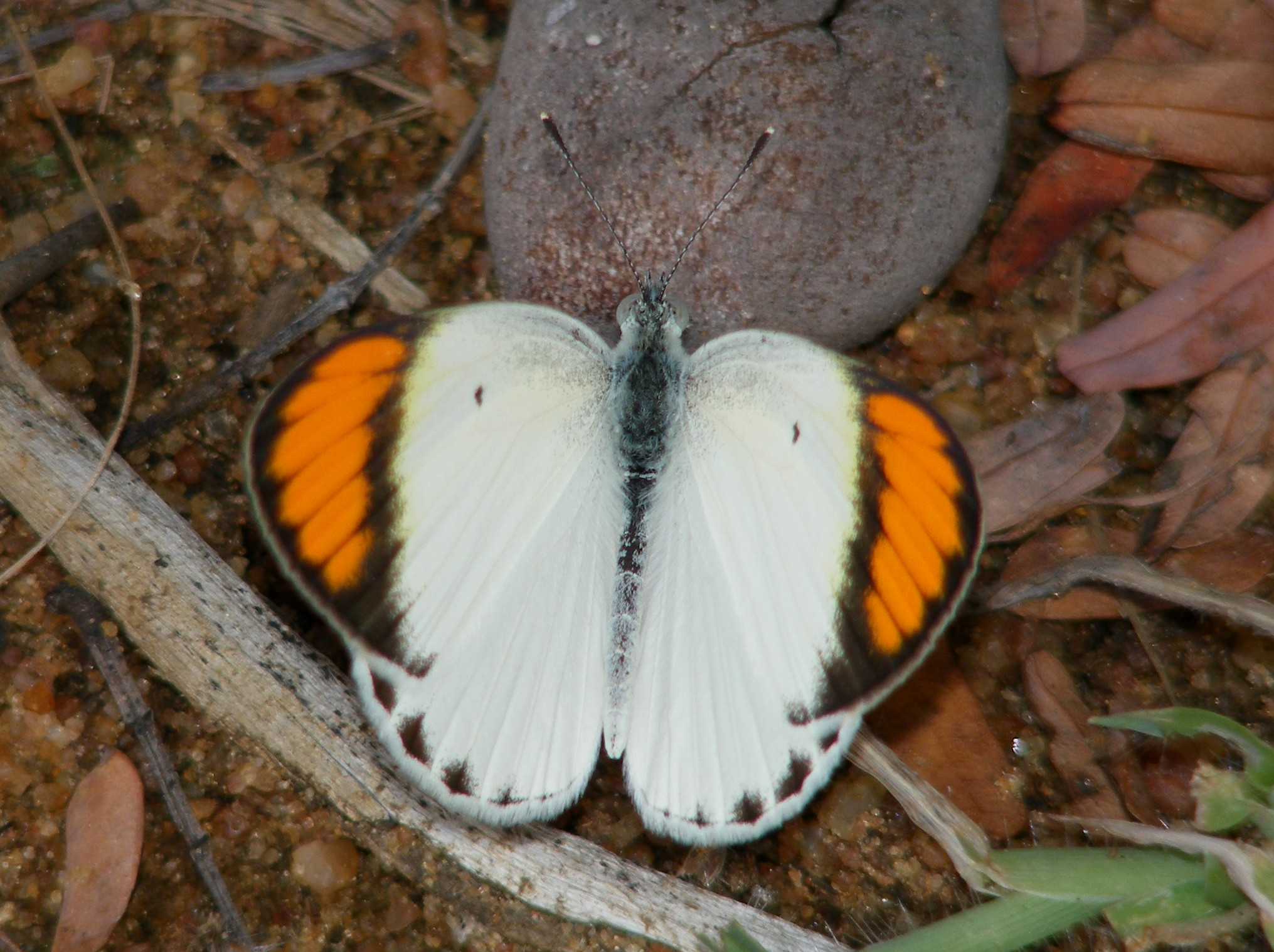
Dorsal view (male)

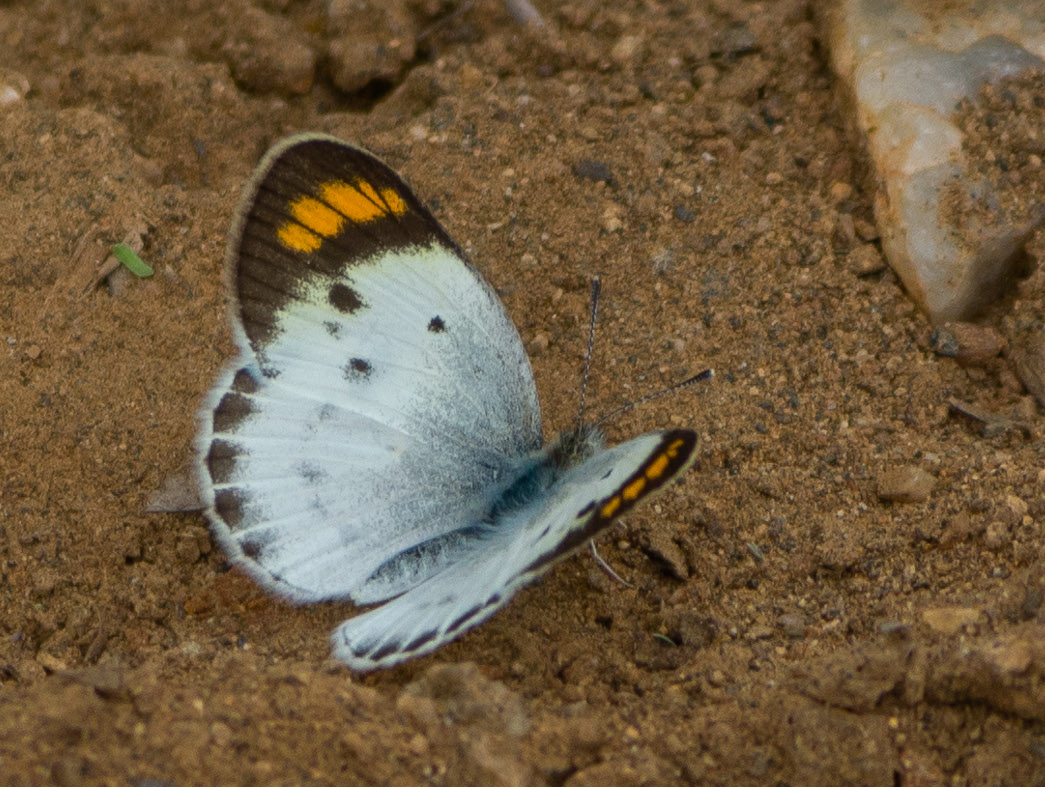
Dorsal view (female)

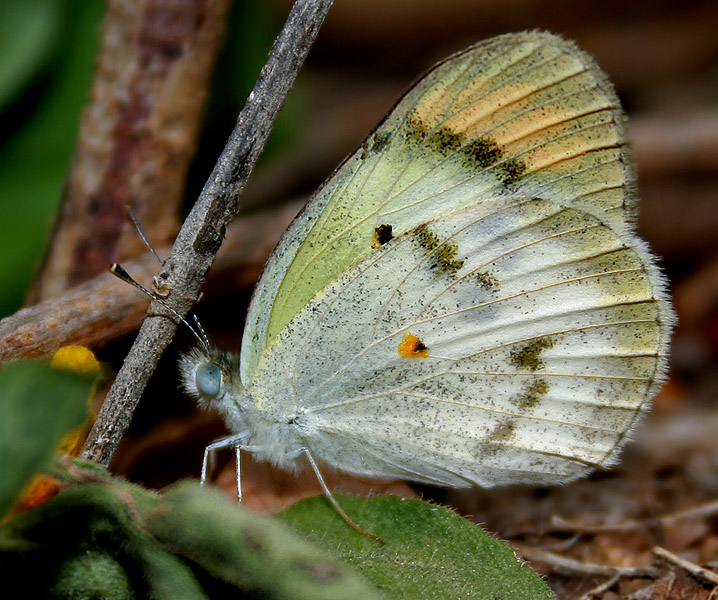
Ventral view

===== Colotis fausta (large salmon Arab) =====
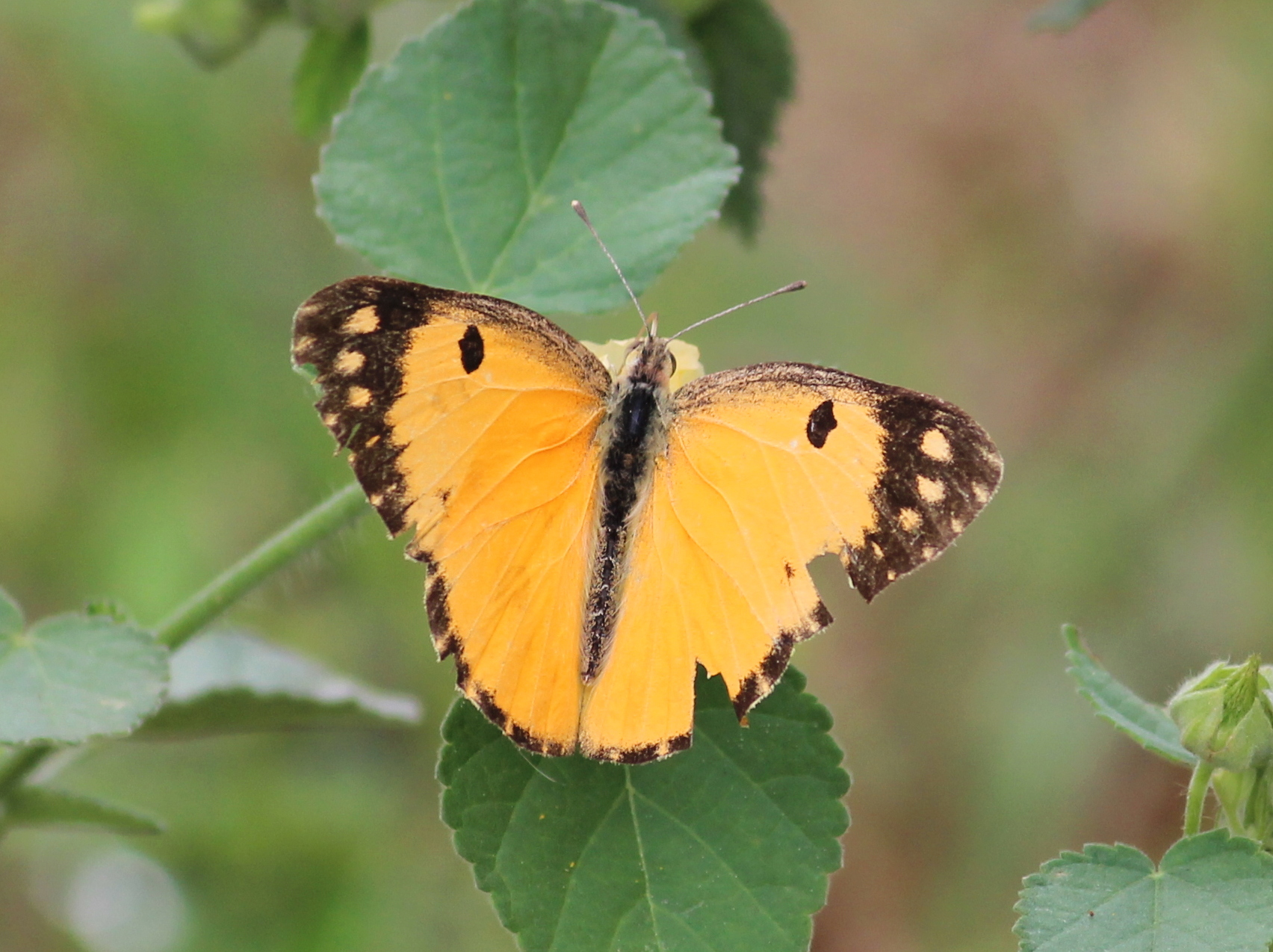
Dorsal view (male)

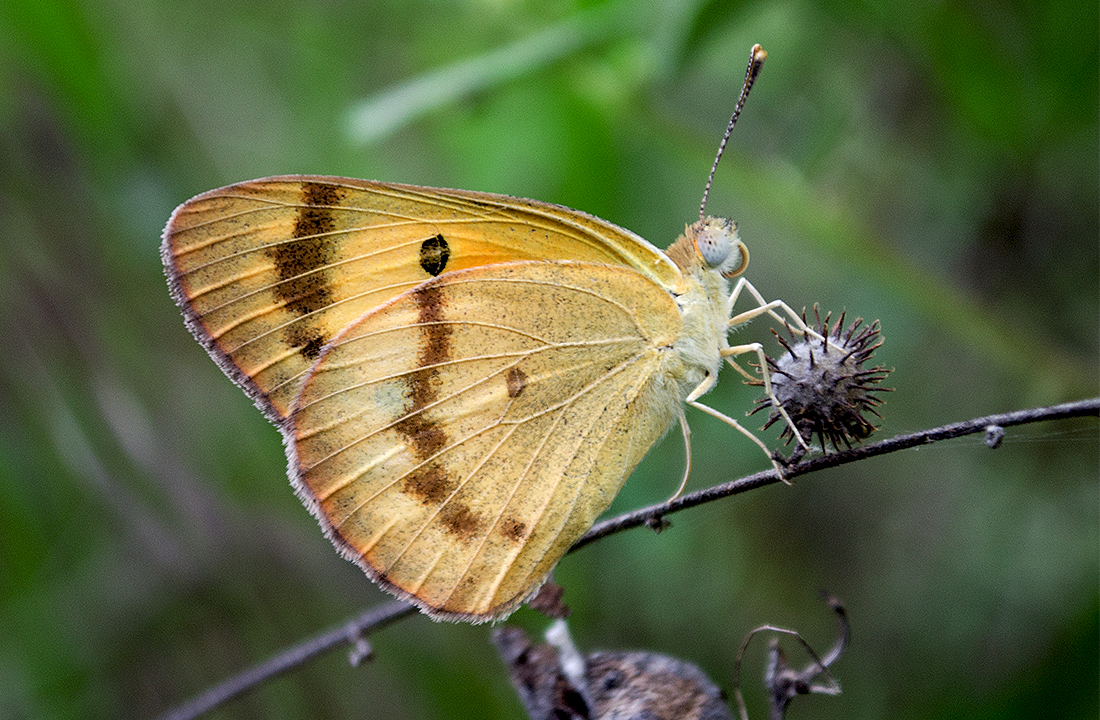
Ventral view (male)

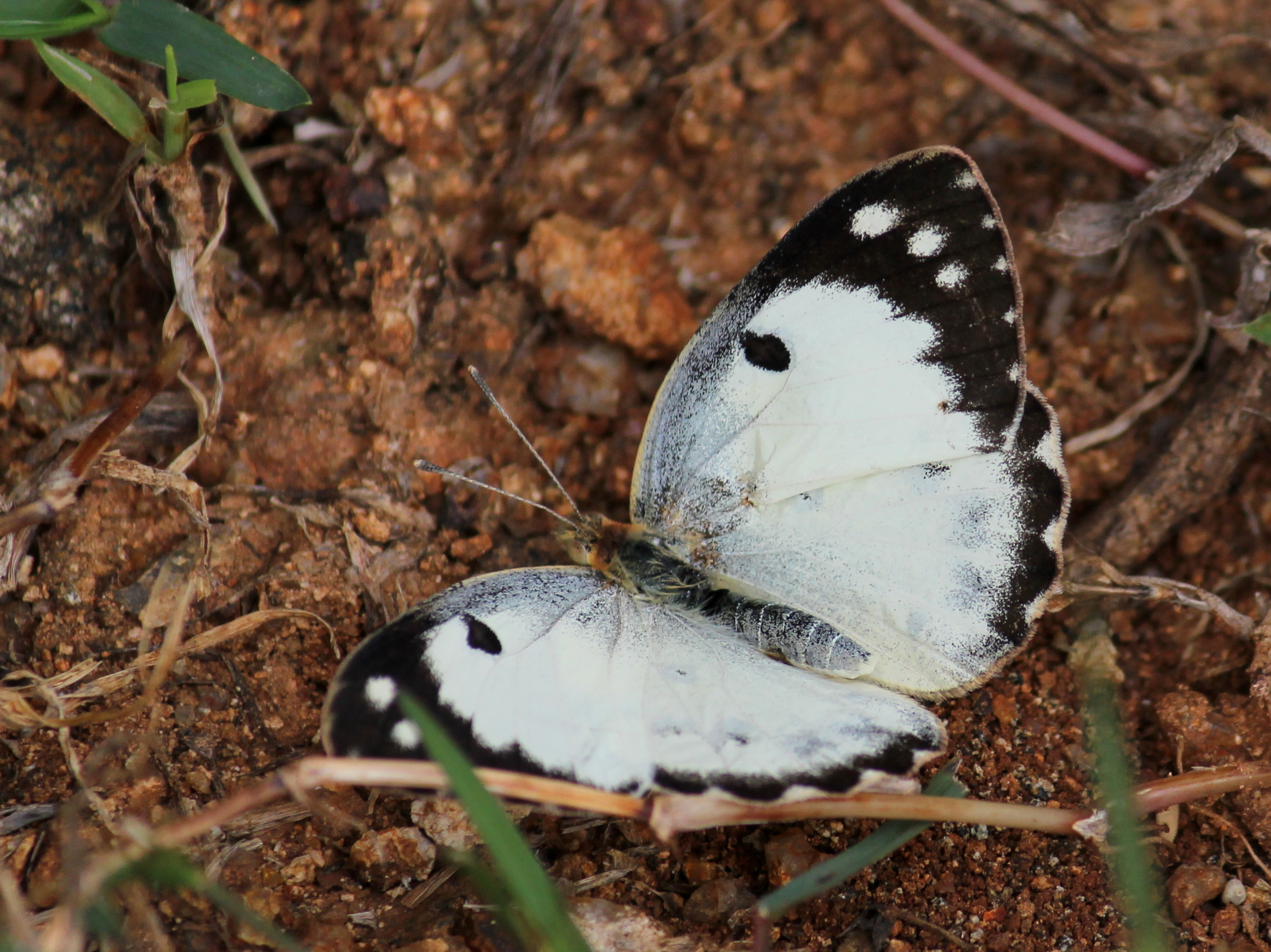
Dorsal view (female)

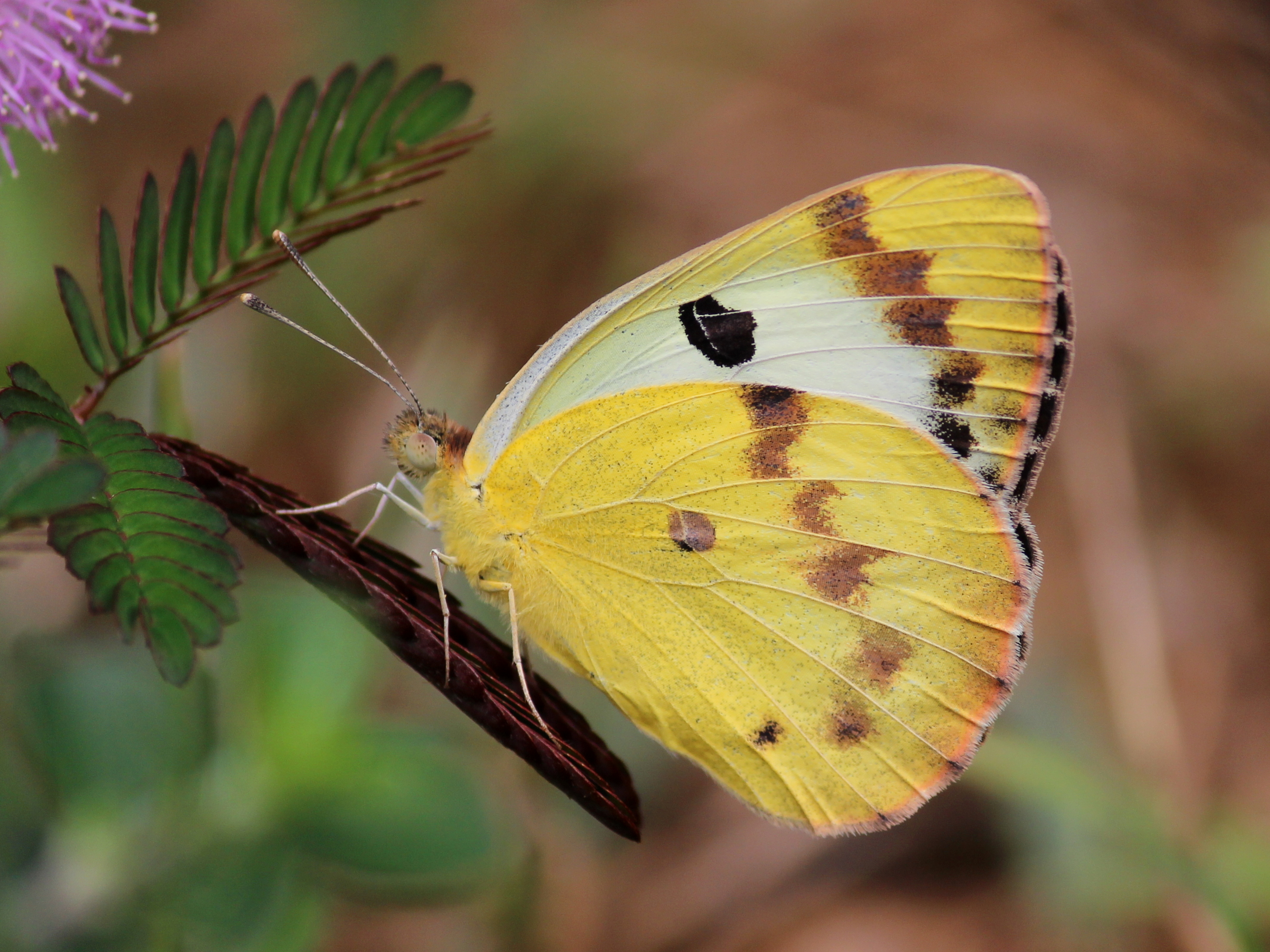
Ventral view (female)

==== Genus: Delias (Jezebels) ====
===== Delias eucharis (common Jezebel) =====
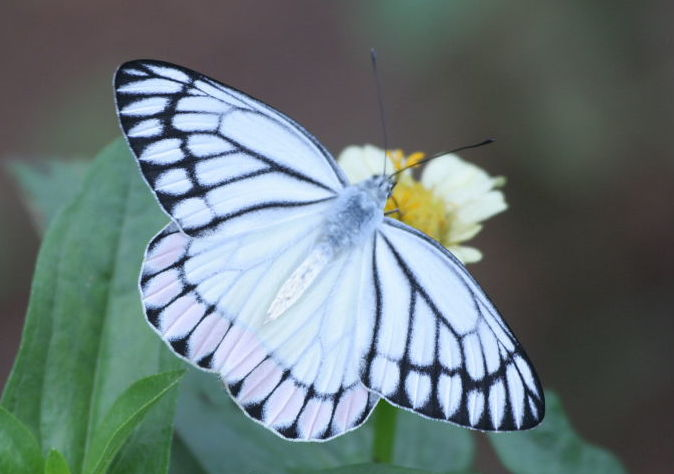
Dorsal view (male)

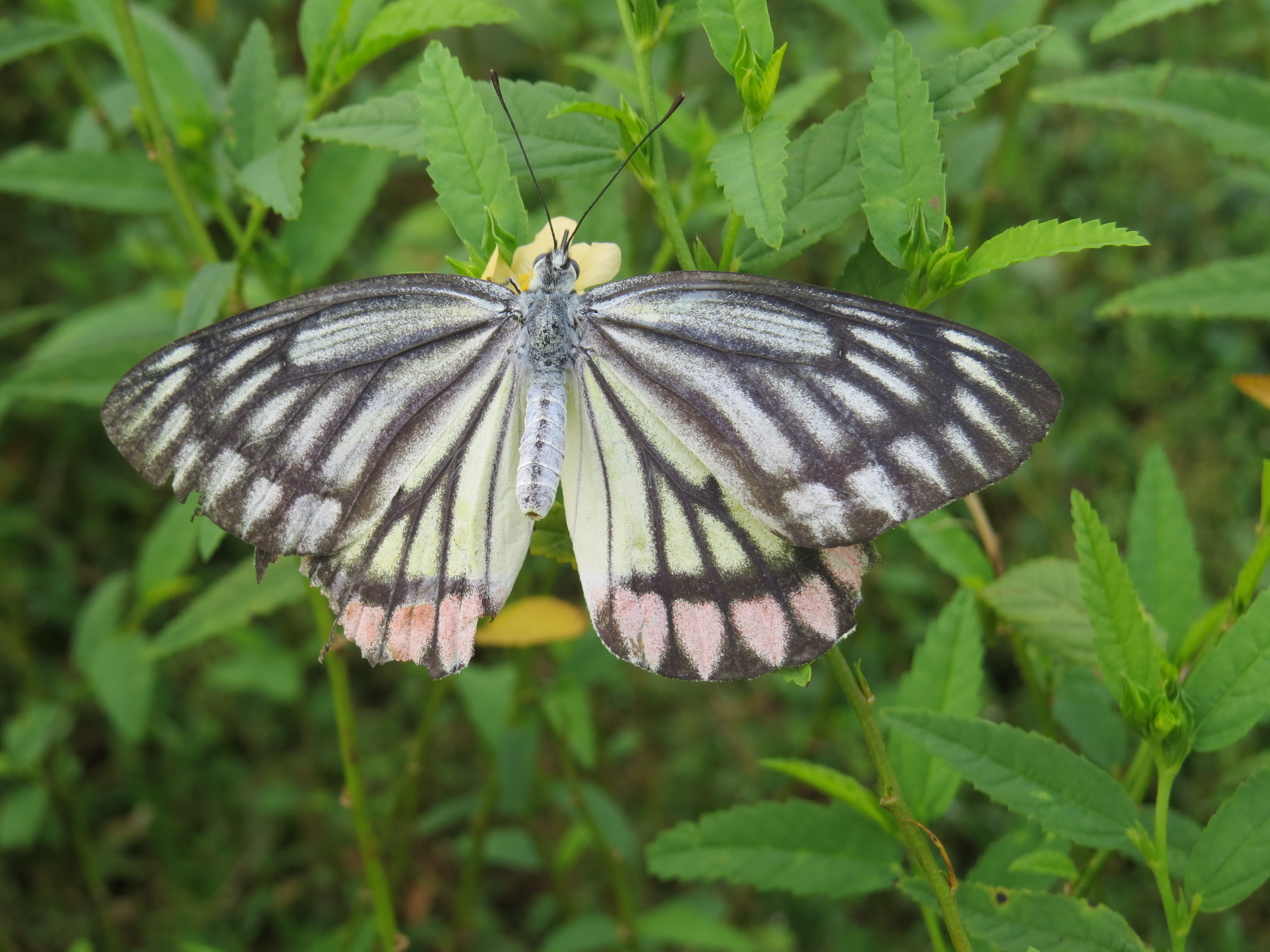
Dorsal view (female)

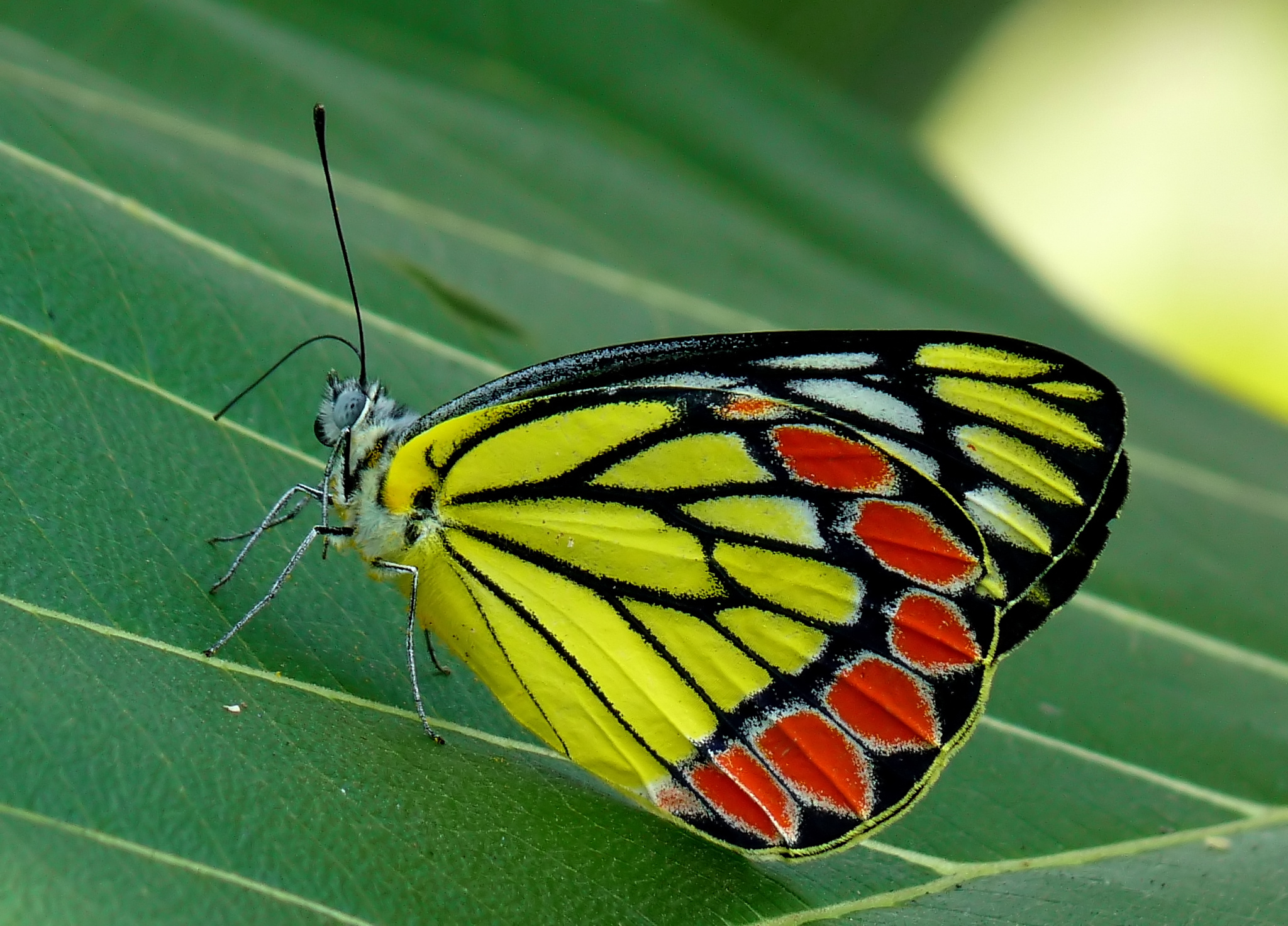
Ventral view

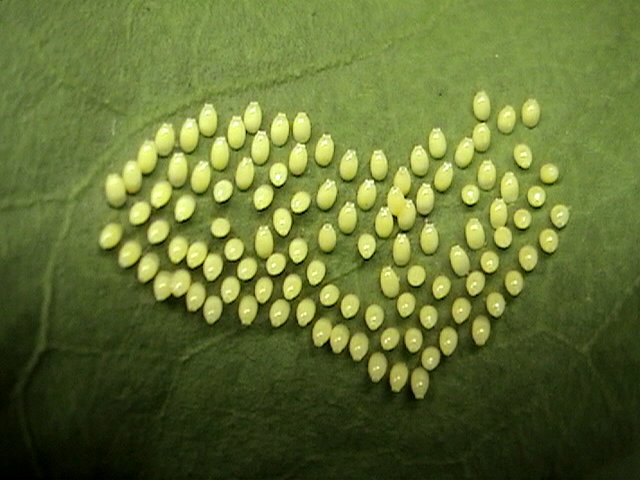
Eggs

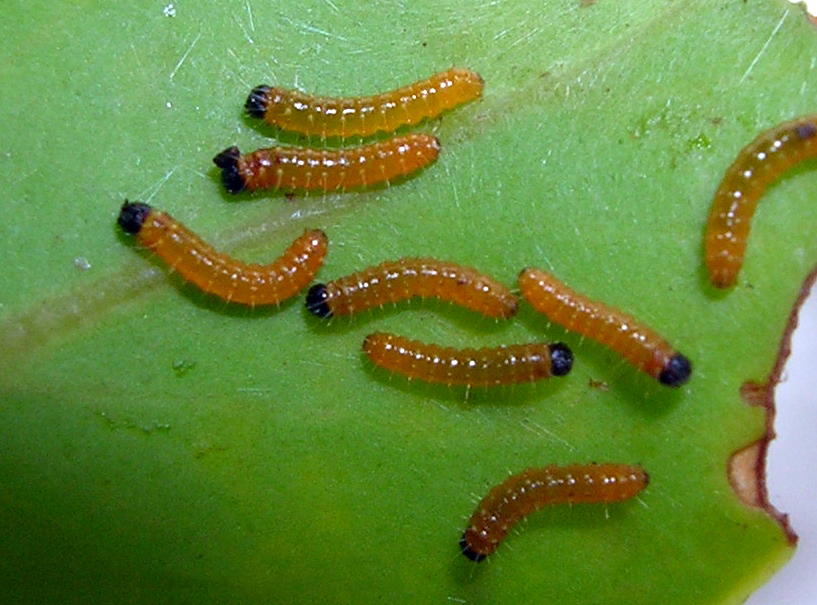
Larva

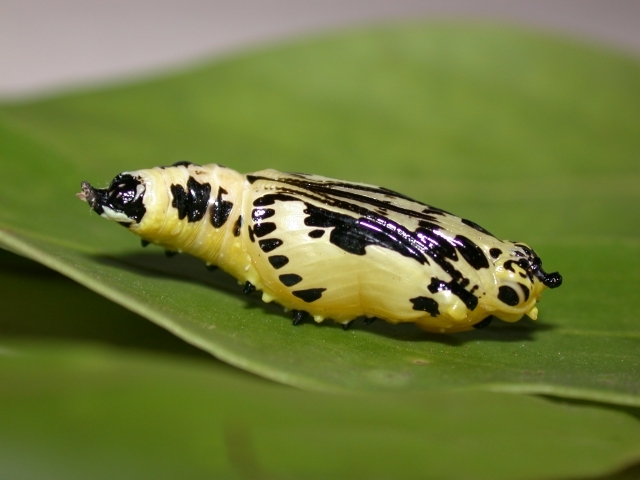
Pupa

==== Genus: Hebomoia (great orange tips) ====
===== Hebomoia glaucippe (great orange tip) =====
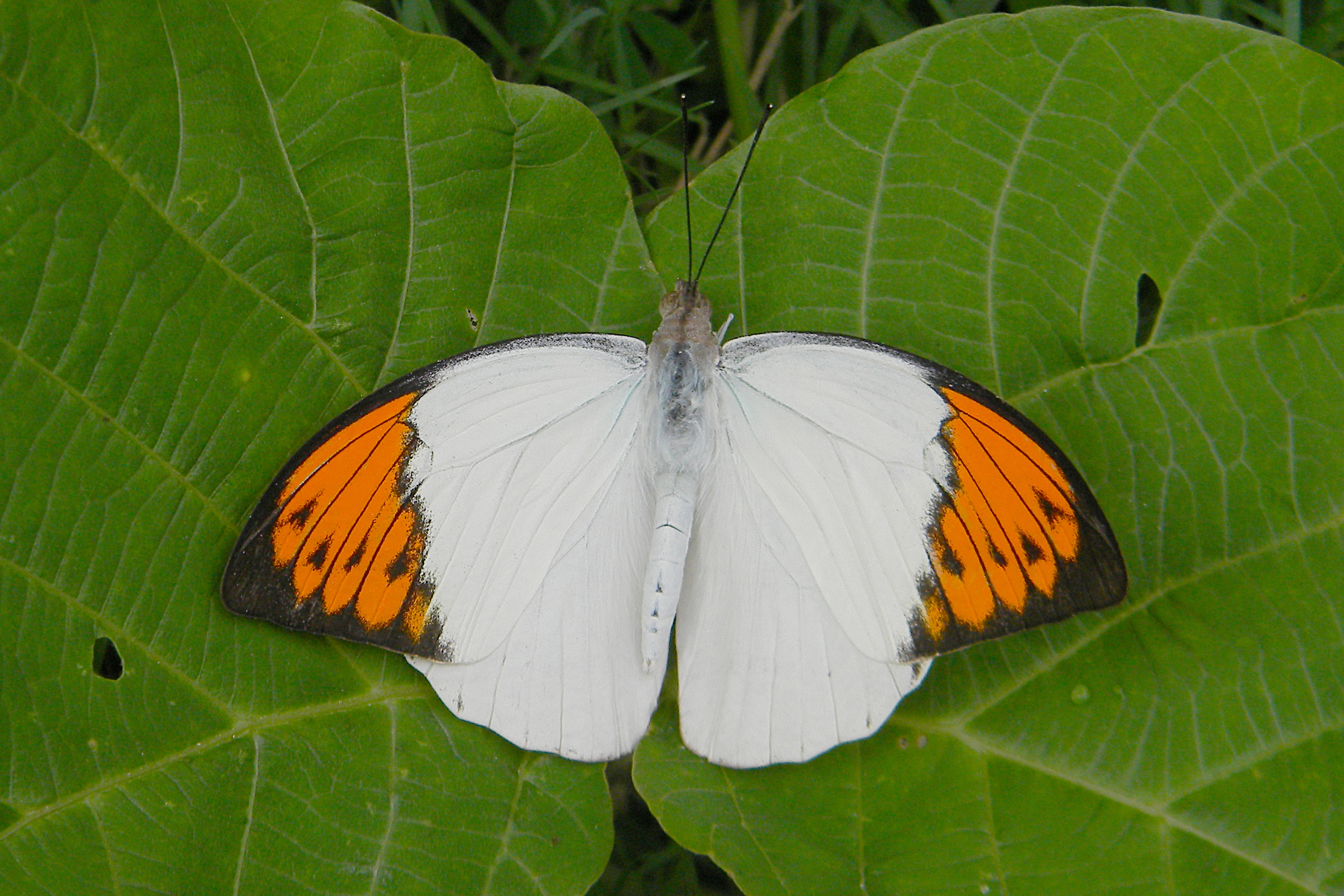
Dorsal view

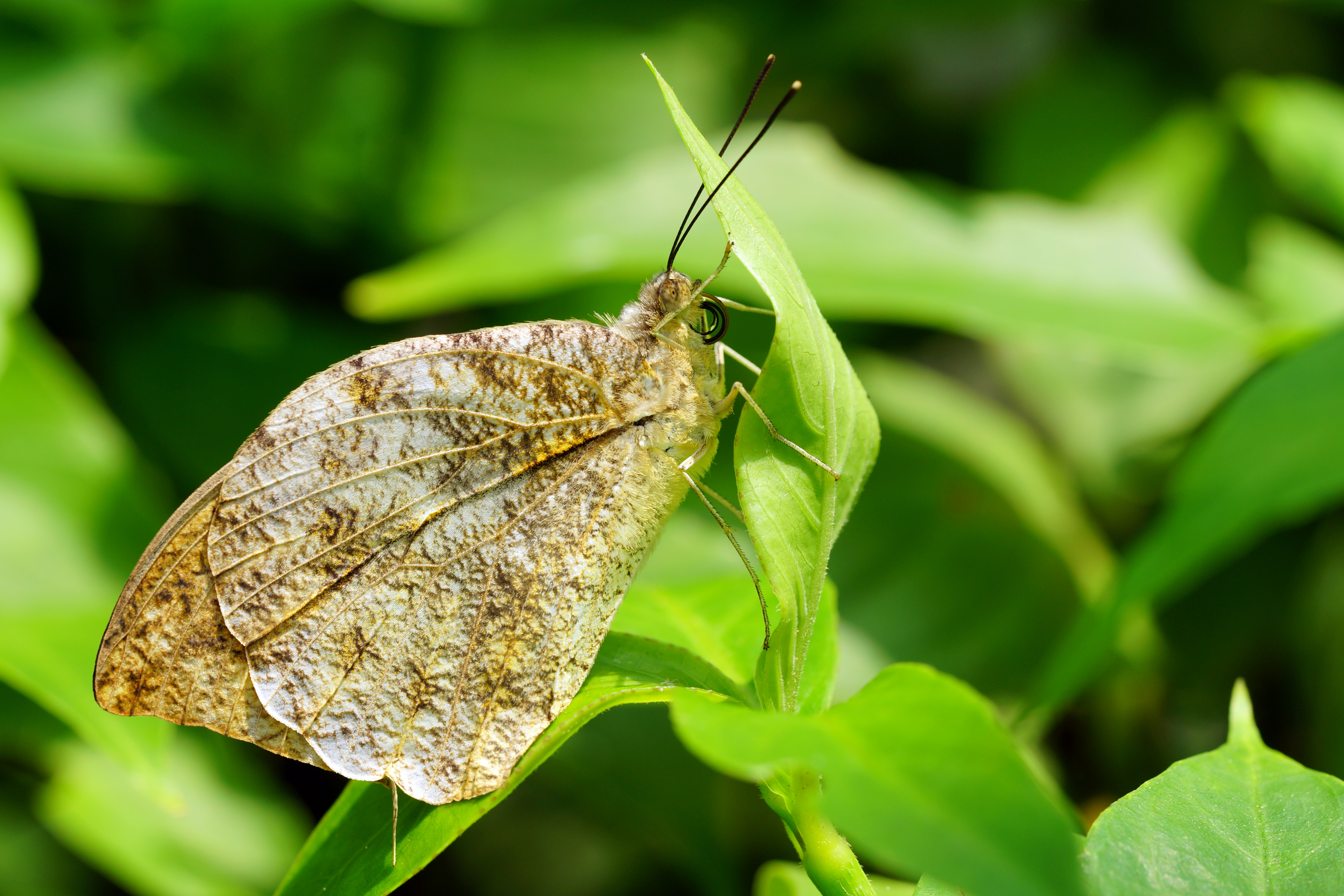
Ventral view

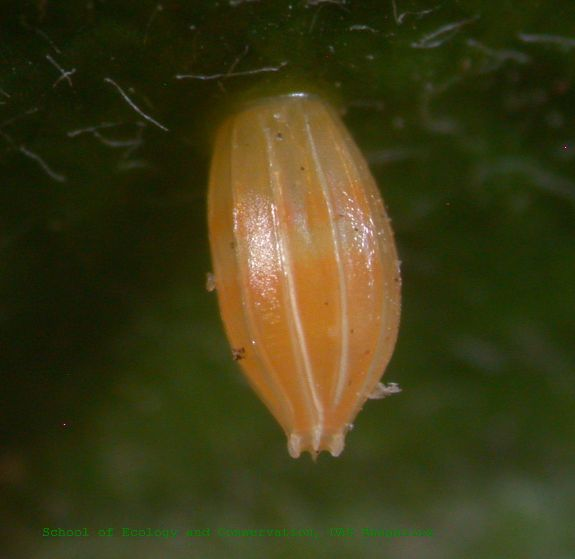
Egg

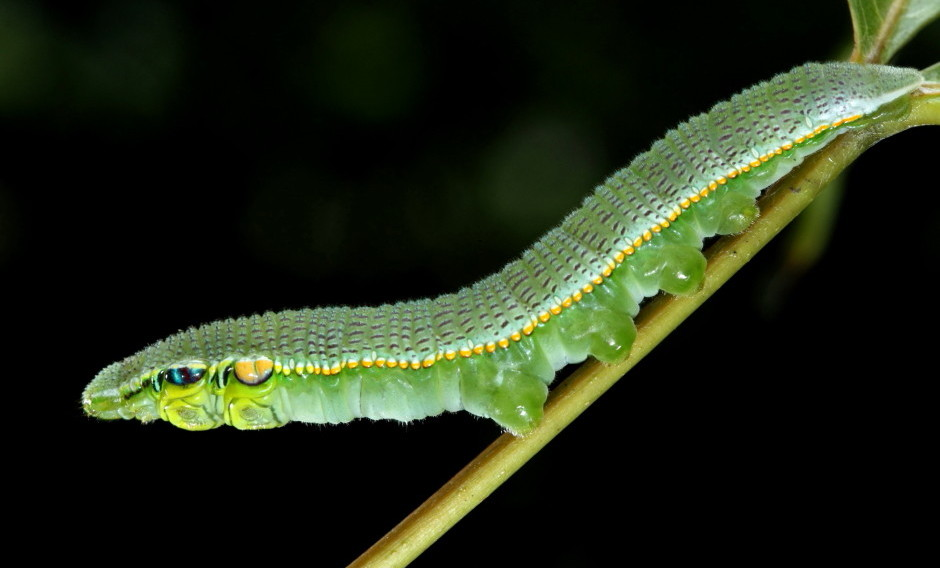
Larva

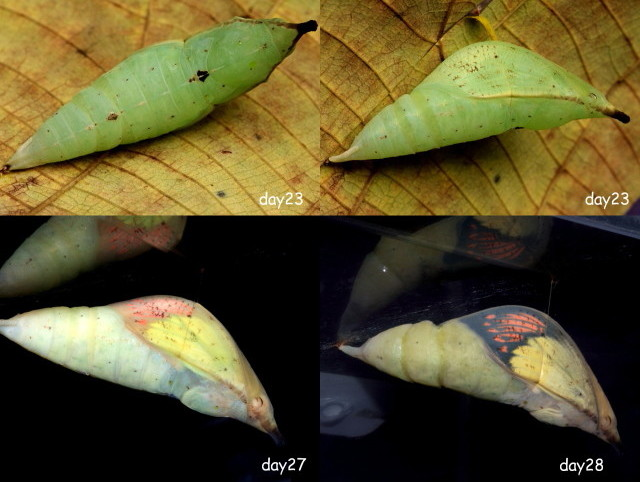
Pupa

==== Genus: Ixias (Indian orange tips) ====
===== Ixias marianne (white orange tip) =====
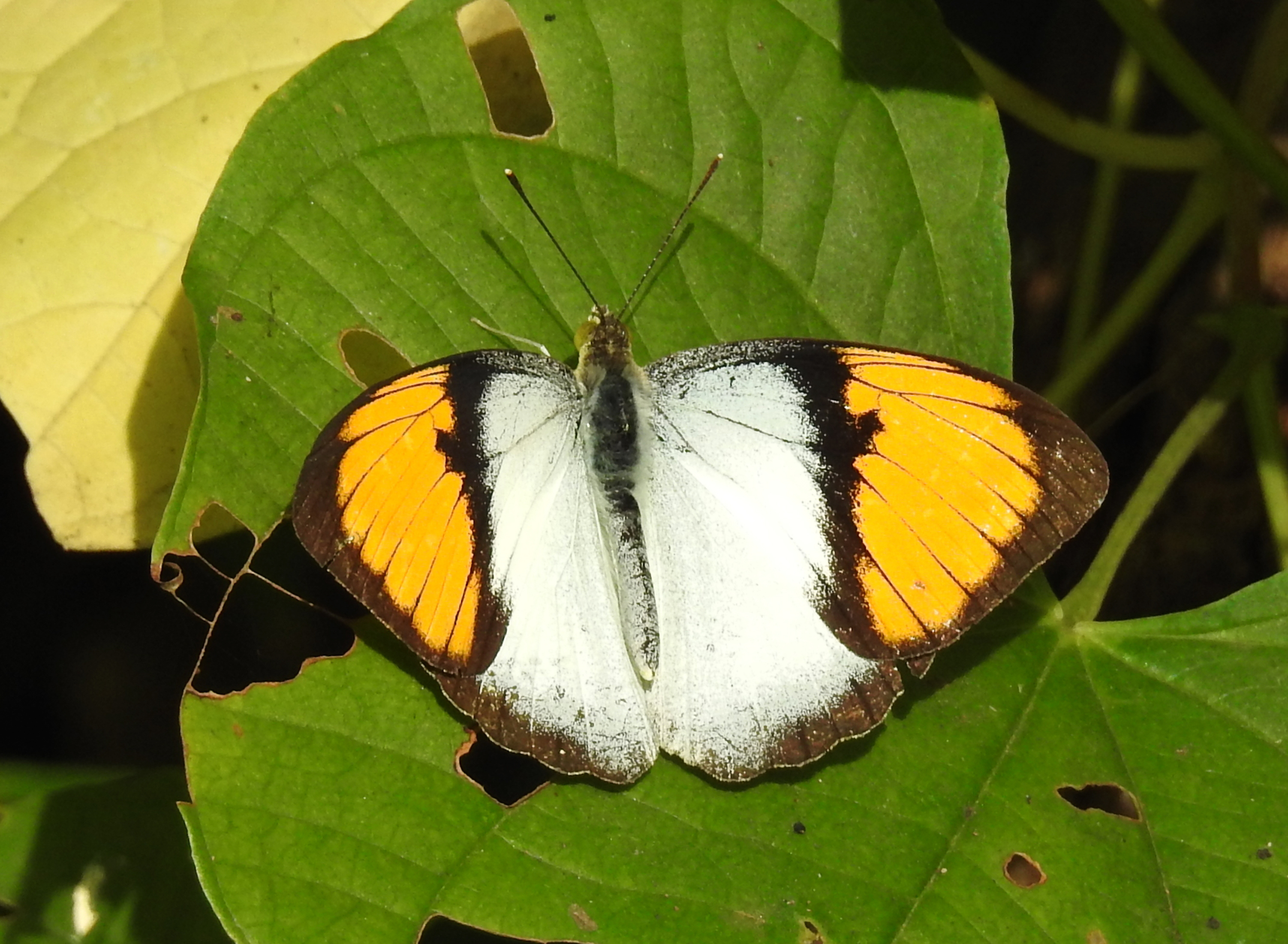
Dorsal view (male)

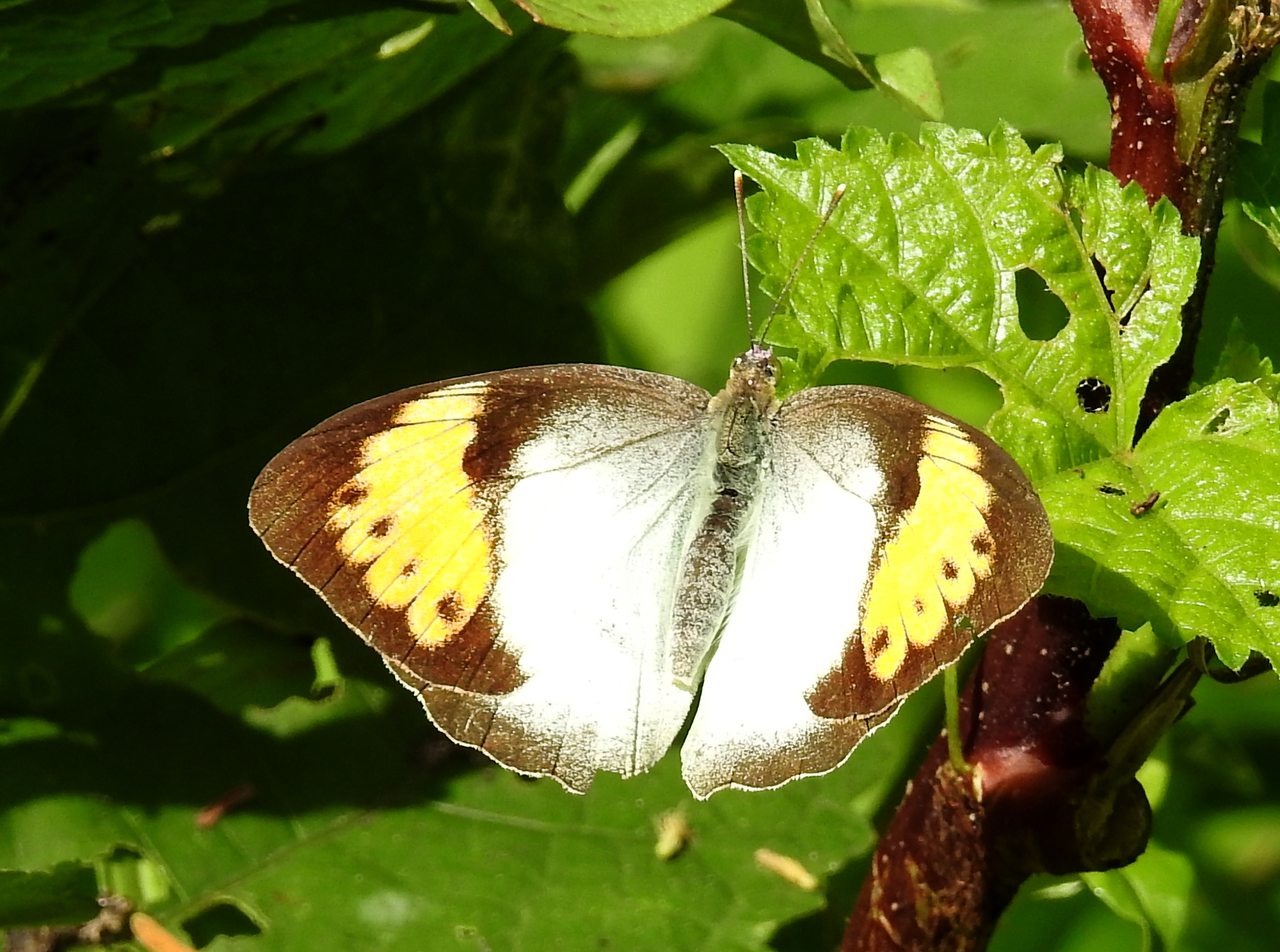
Dorsal view (female)

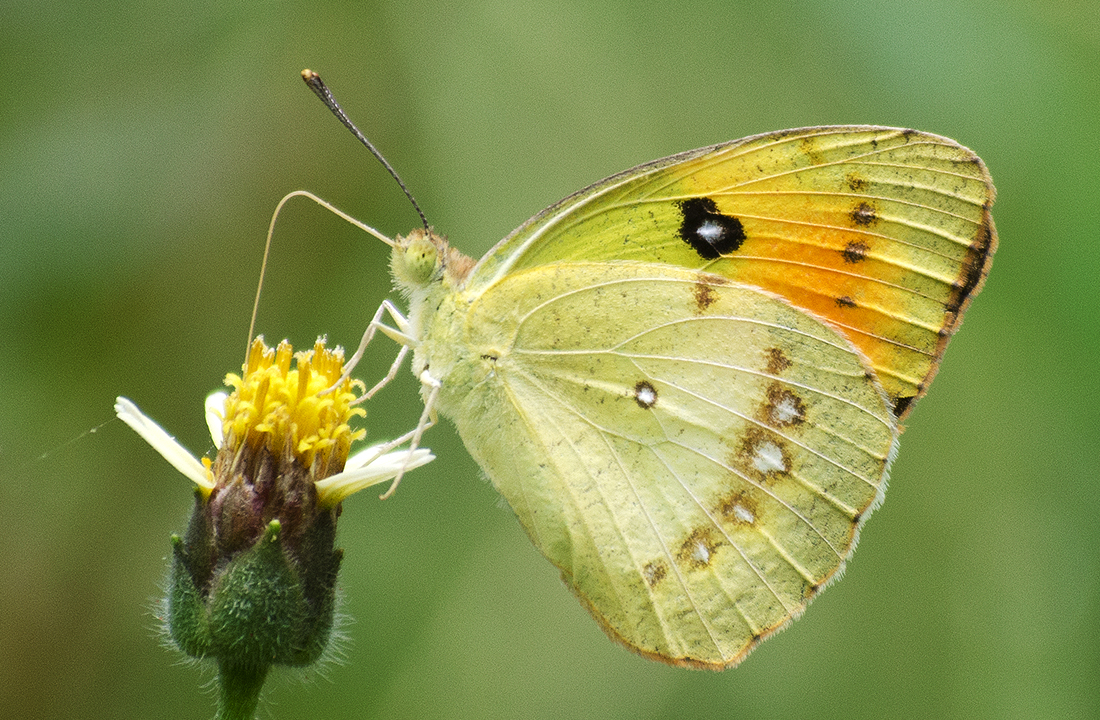
Ventral view

===== Ixias pyrene (yellow orange tip) =====
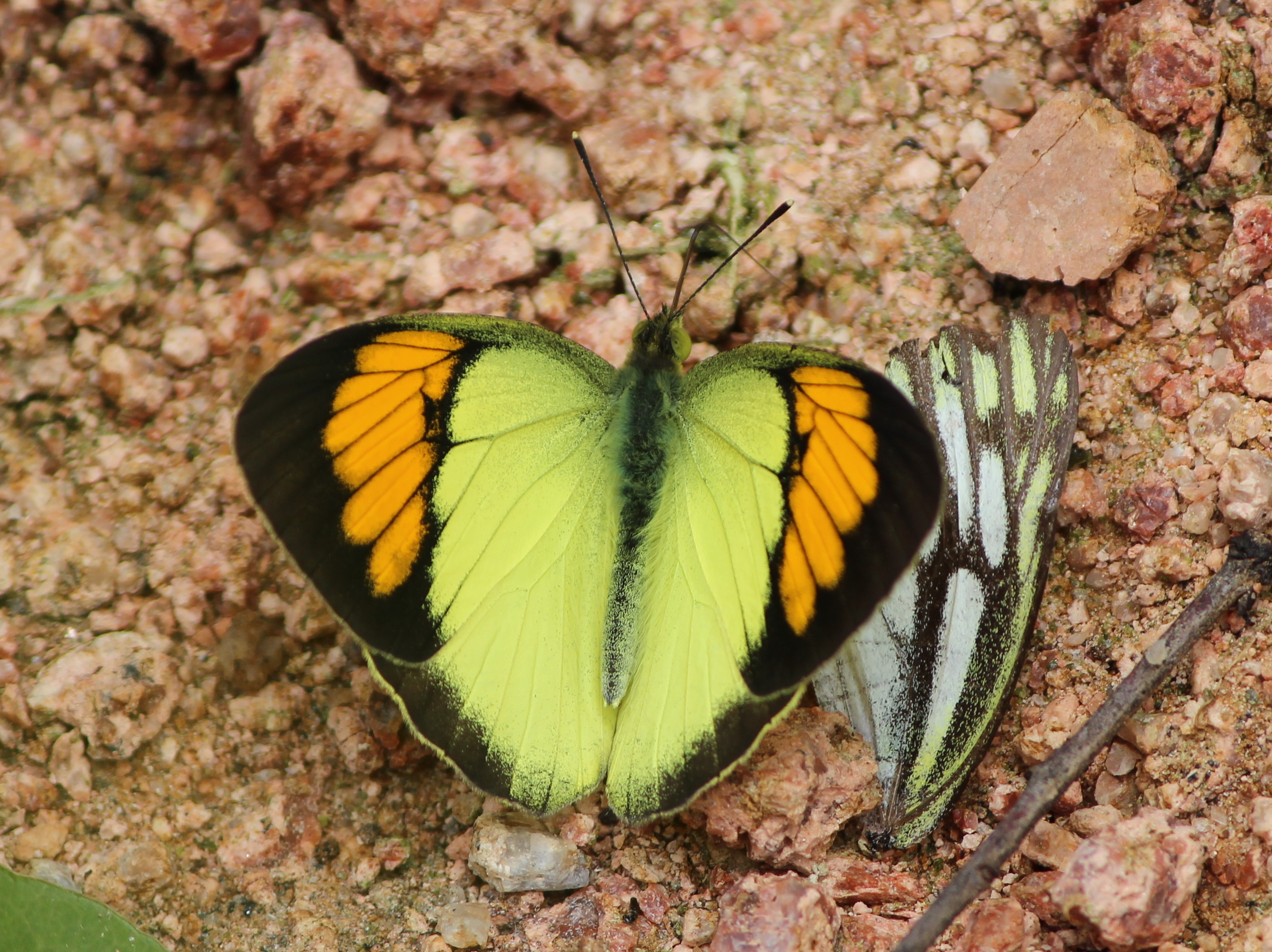
Dorsal view (male)

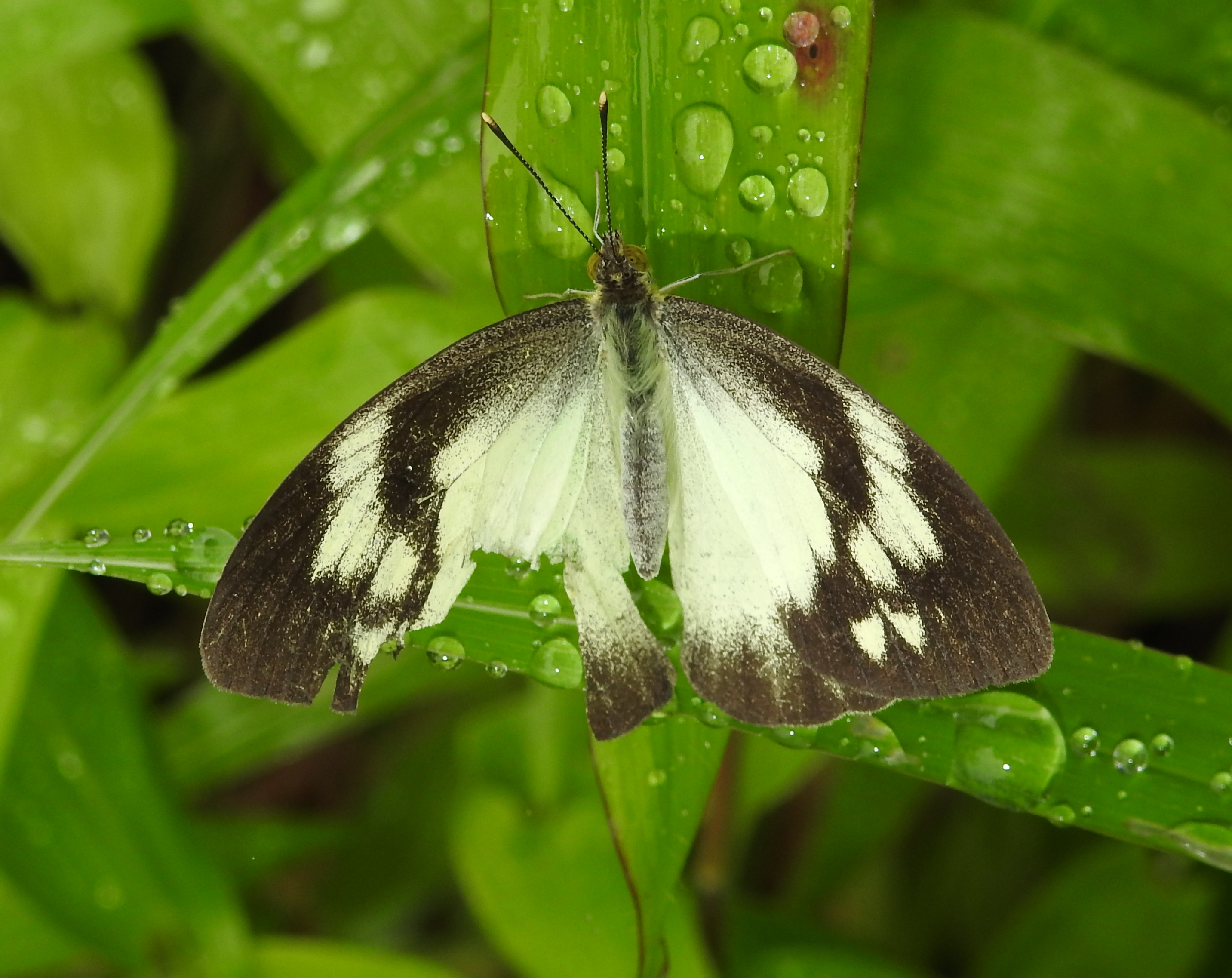
Dorsal view (female)

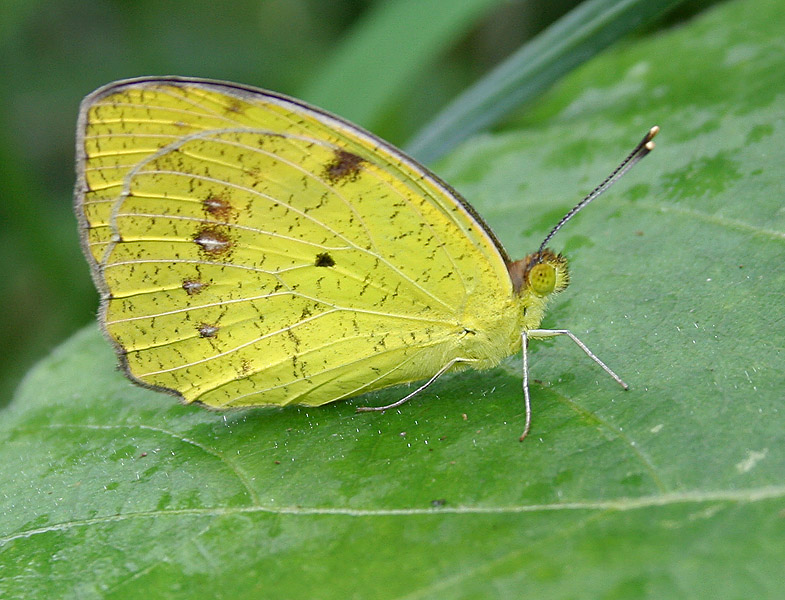
Ventral view

==== Genus: Leptosia (Psyche) ====
===== Leptosia nina (Psyche) =====
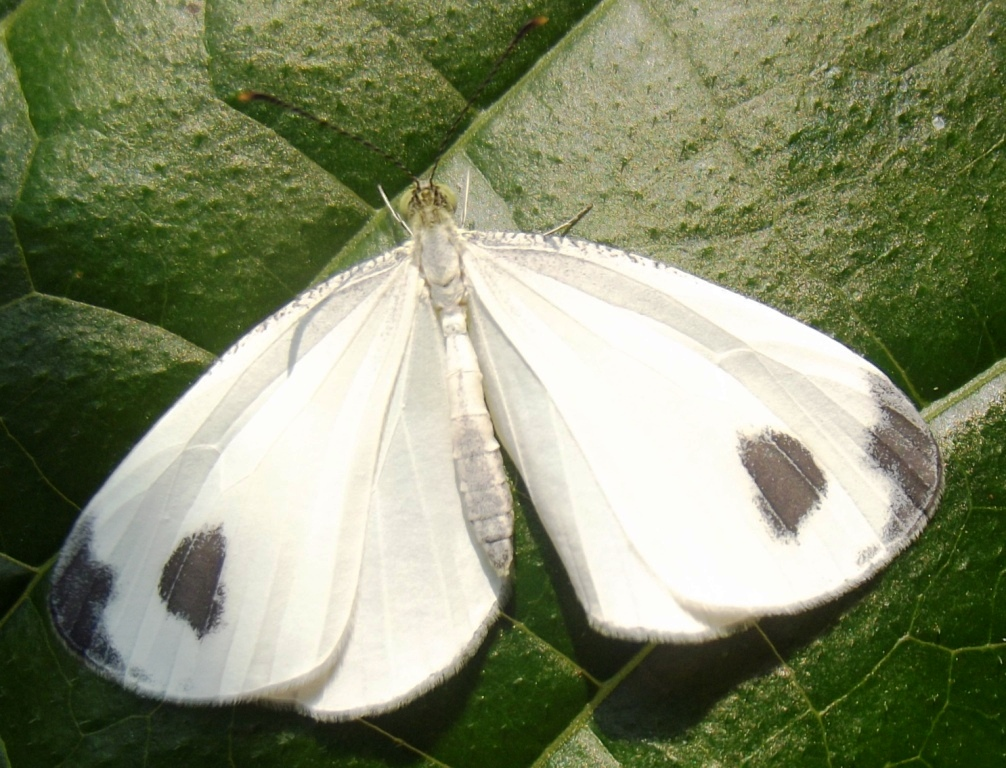
Dorsal view

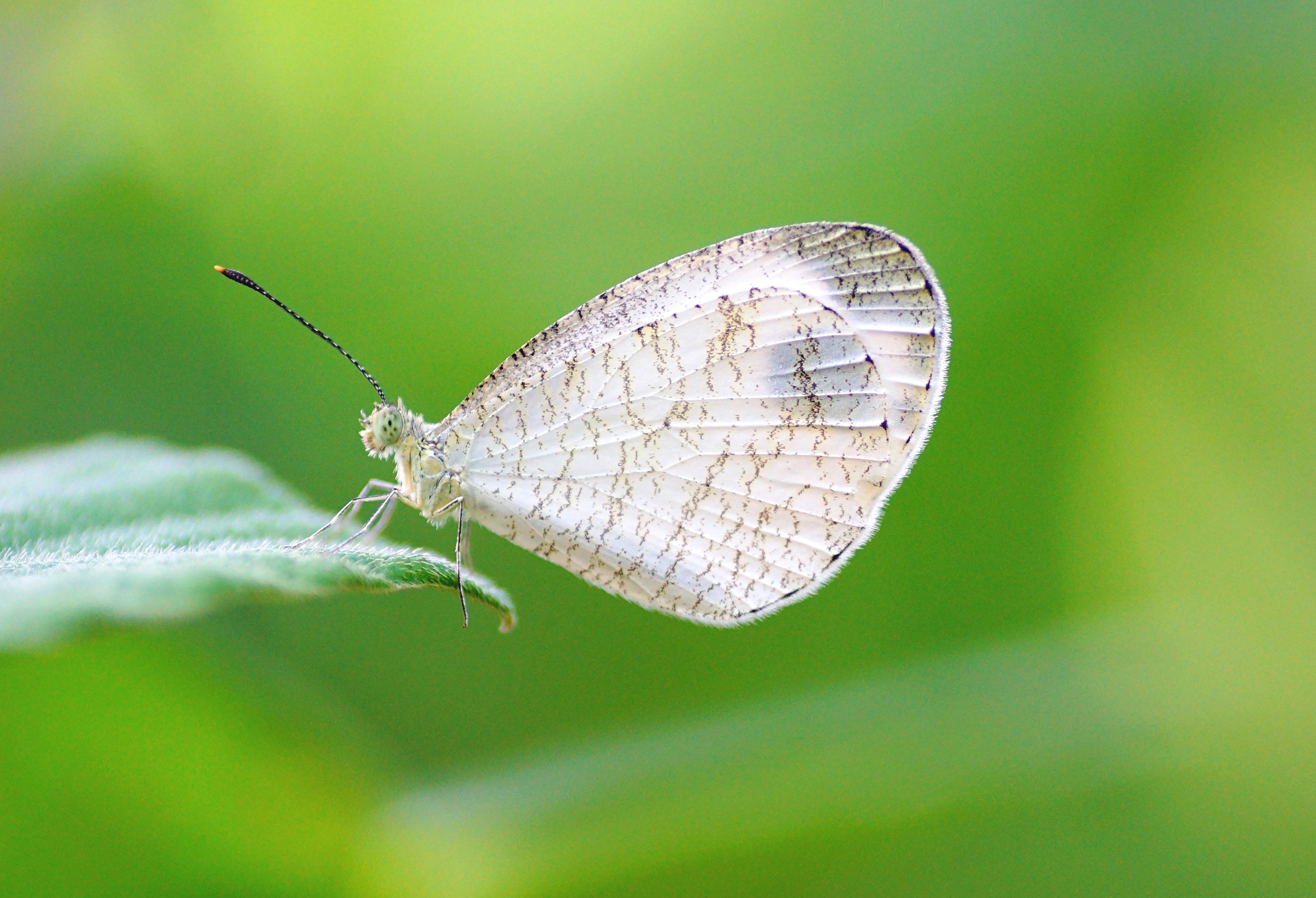
Ventral view

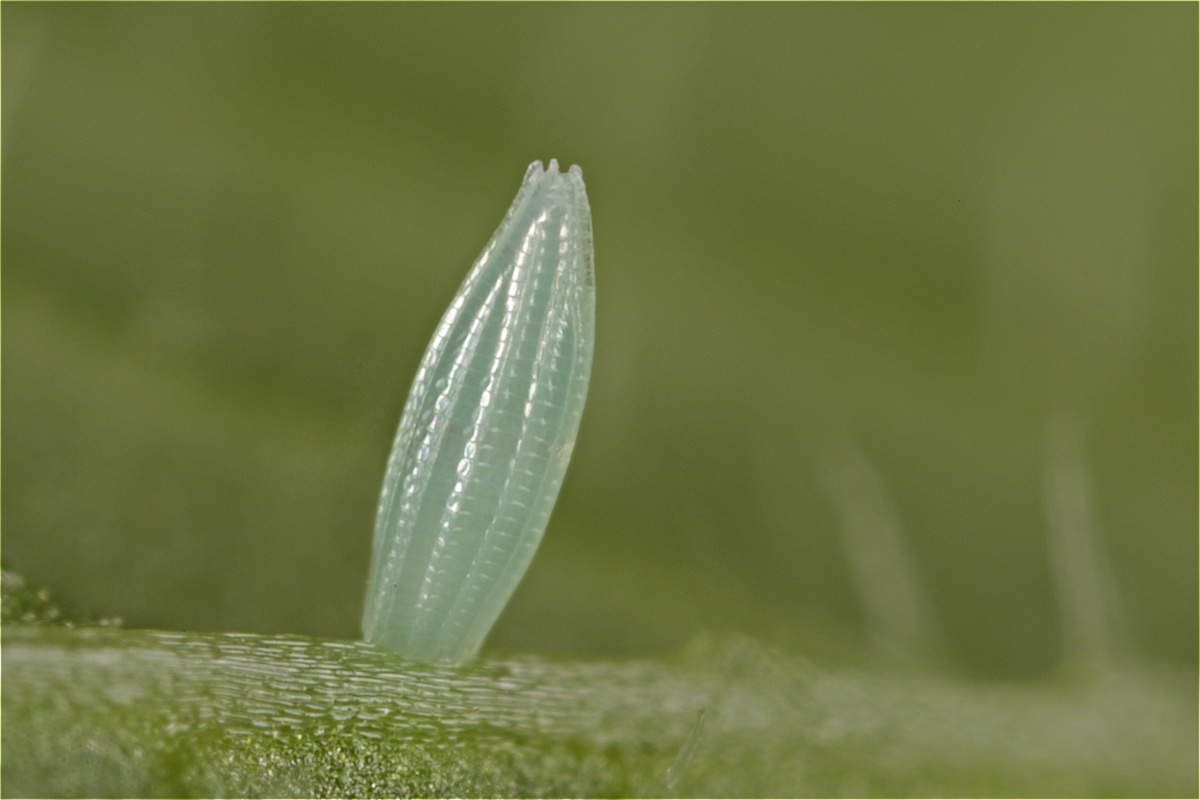
Egg

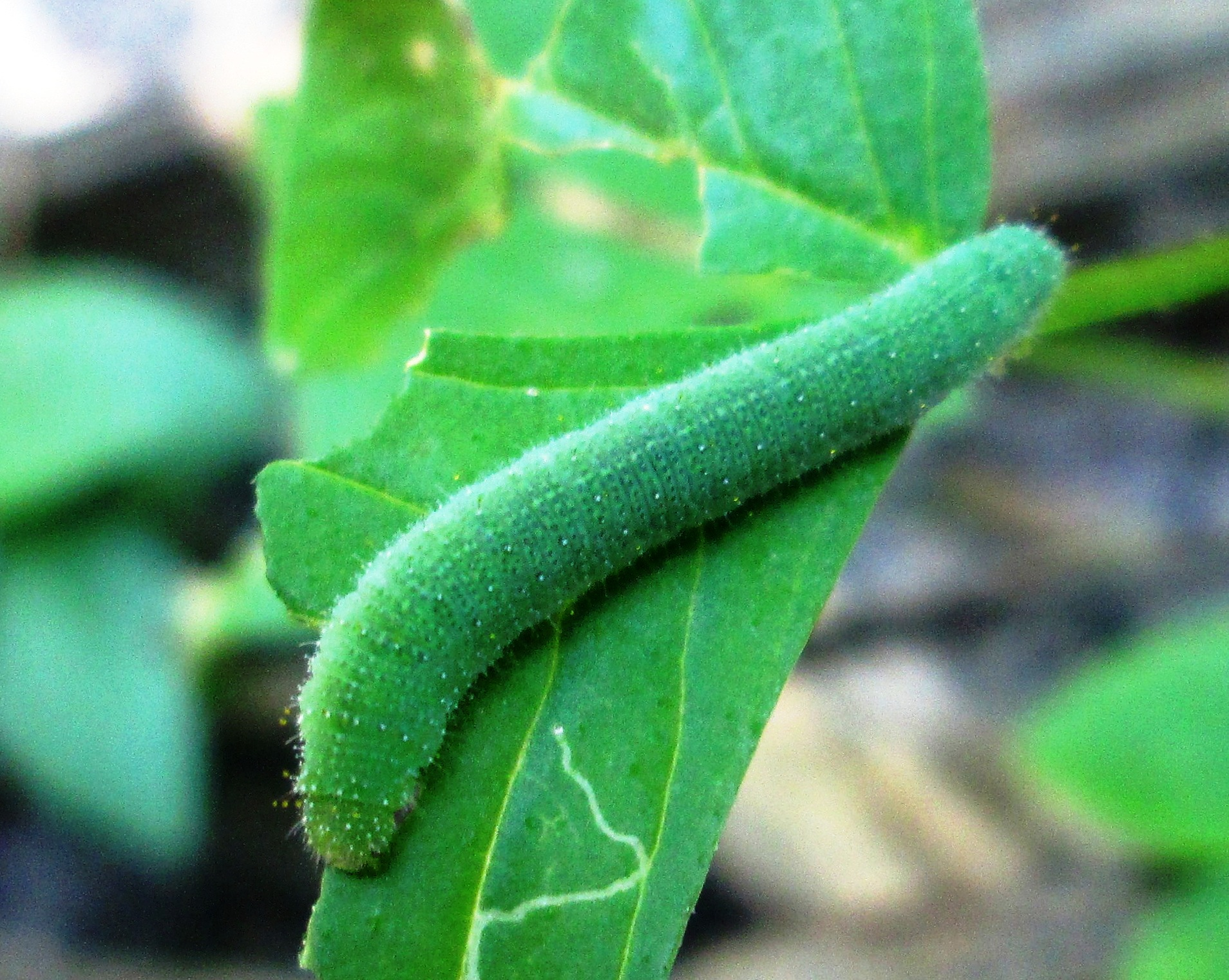
Larva

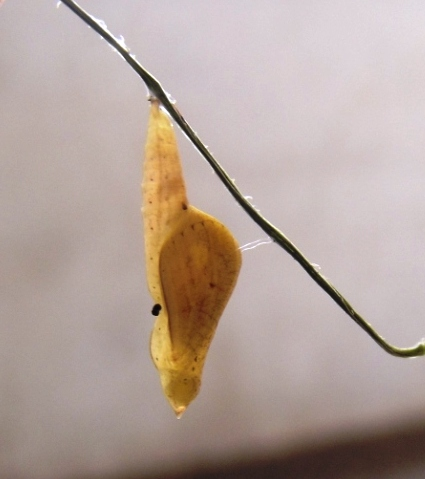
Pupa

==== Genus: Pareronia (wanderers) ====
===== Pareronia ceylanica (dark wanderer) =====
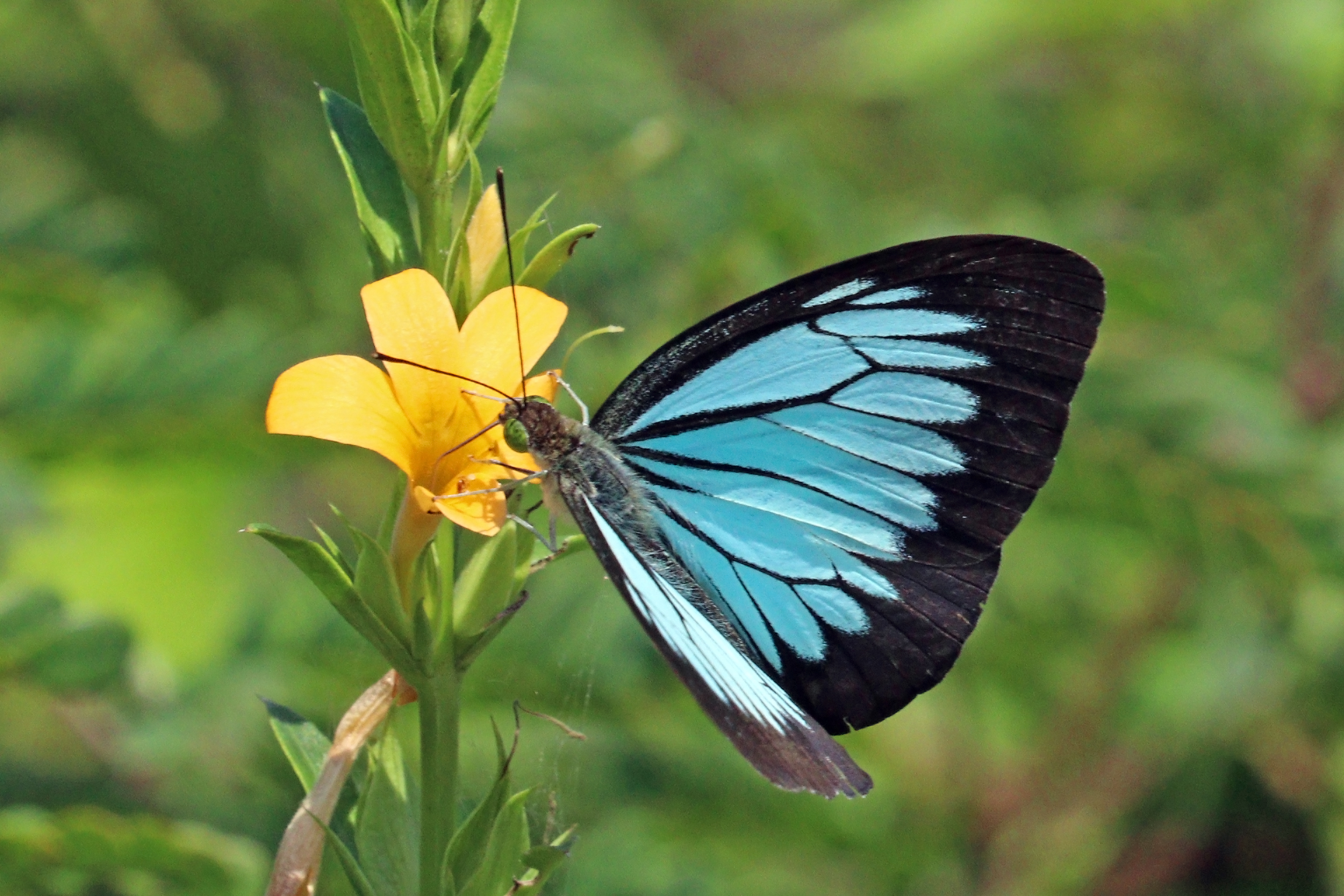
Male, Dorsal view

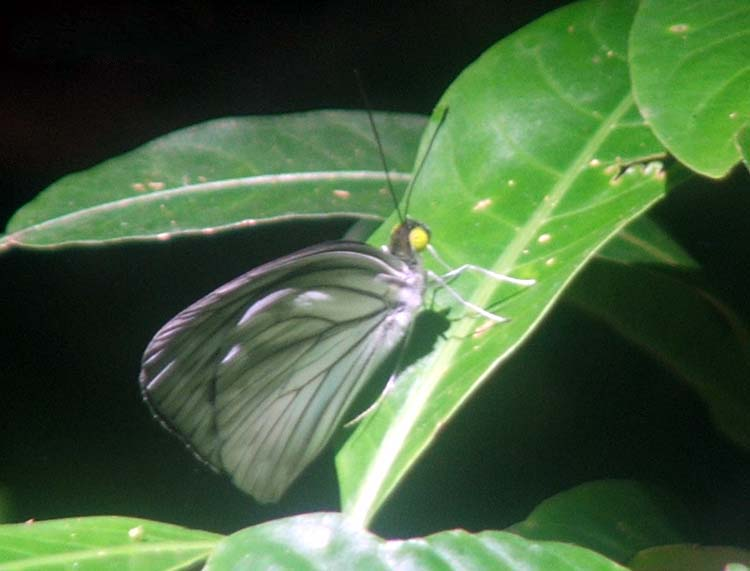
Ventral view

===== Pareronia hippia (common wanderer) =====
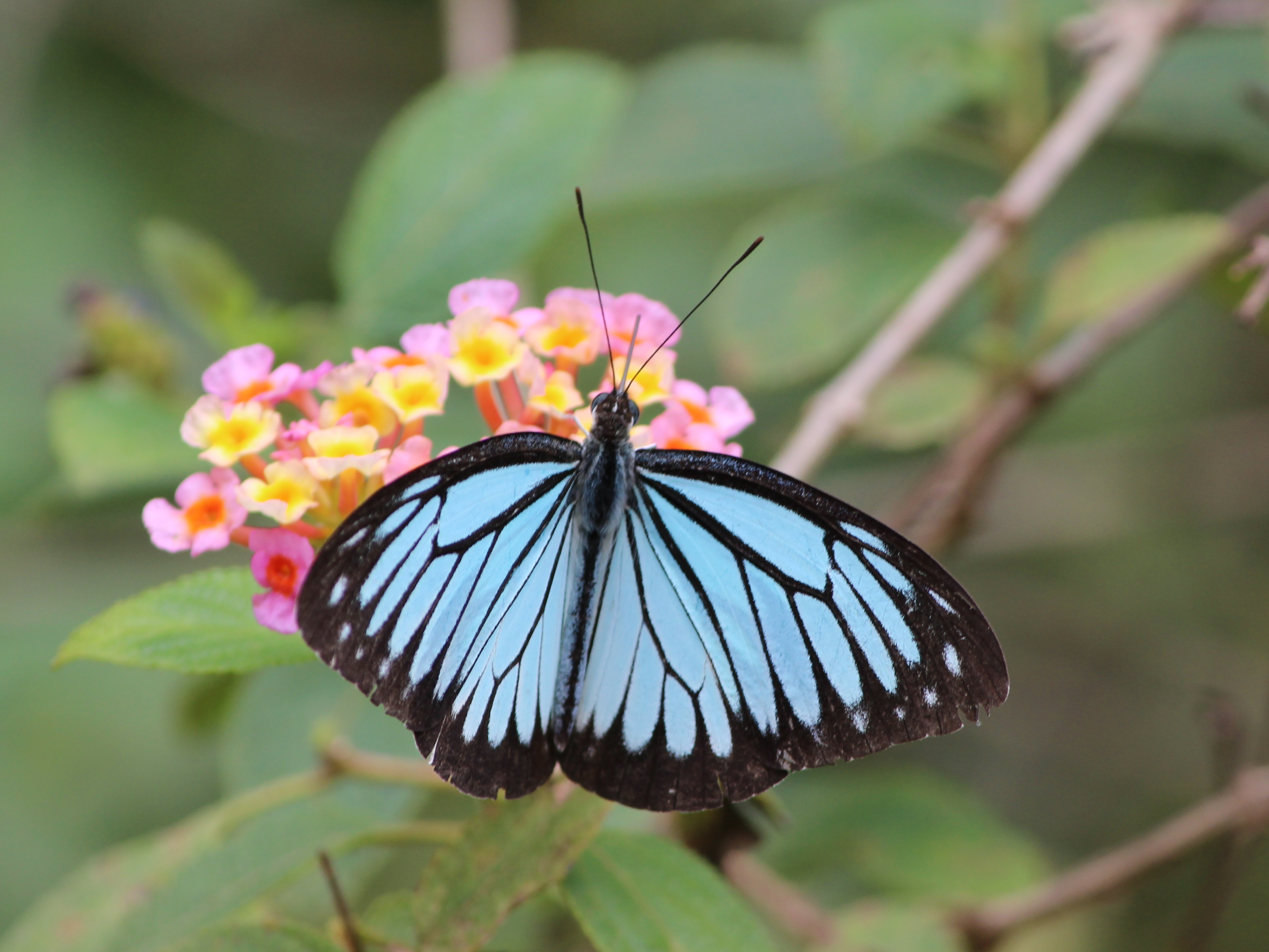
Dorsal view (male)

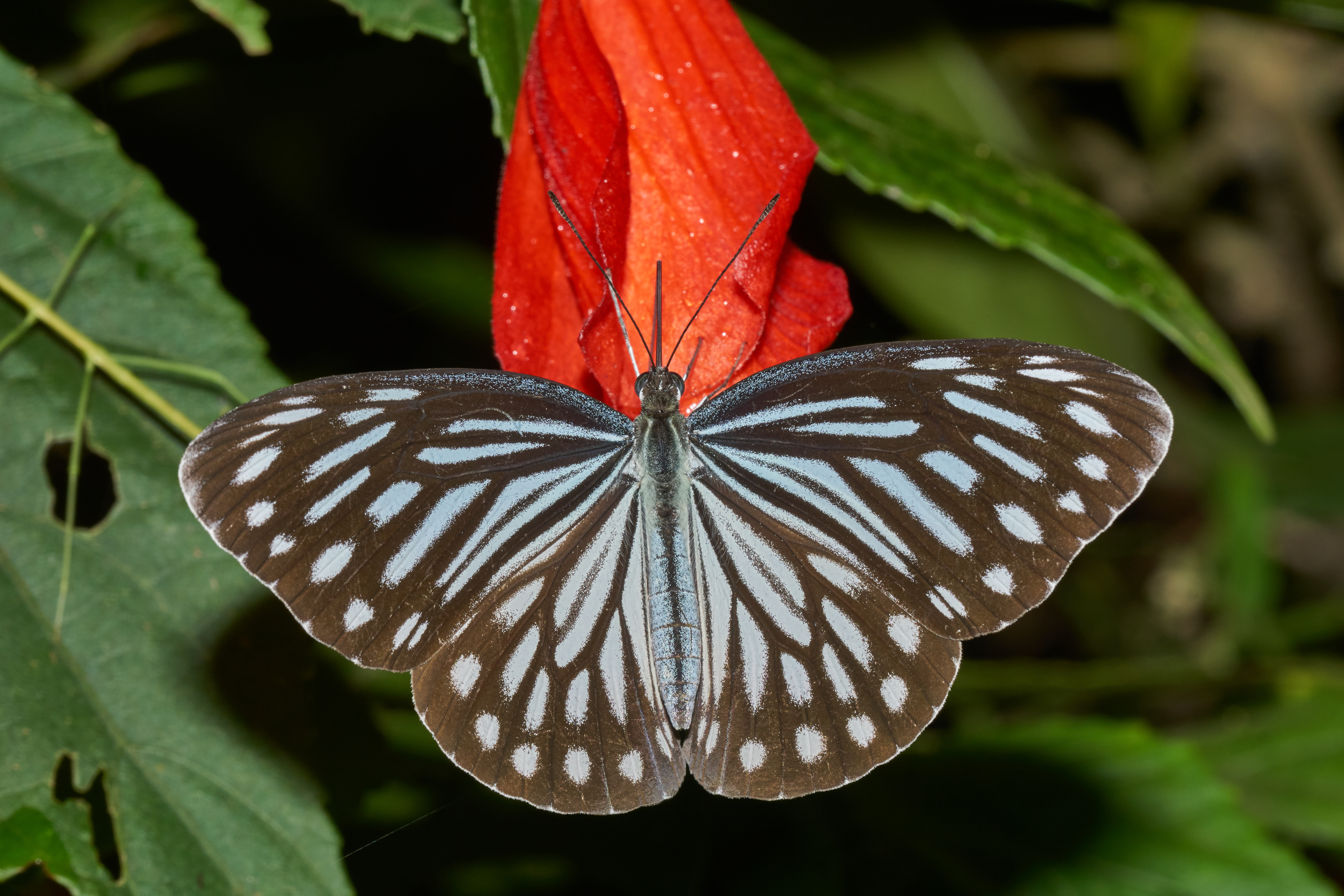
Dorsal view (female)

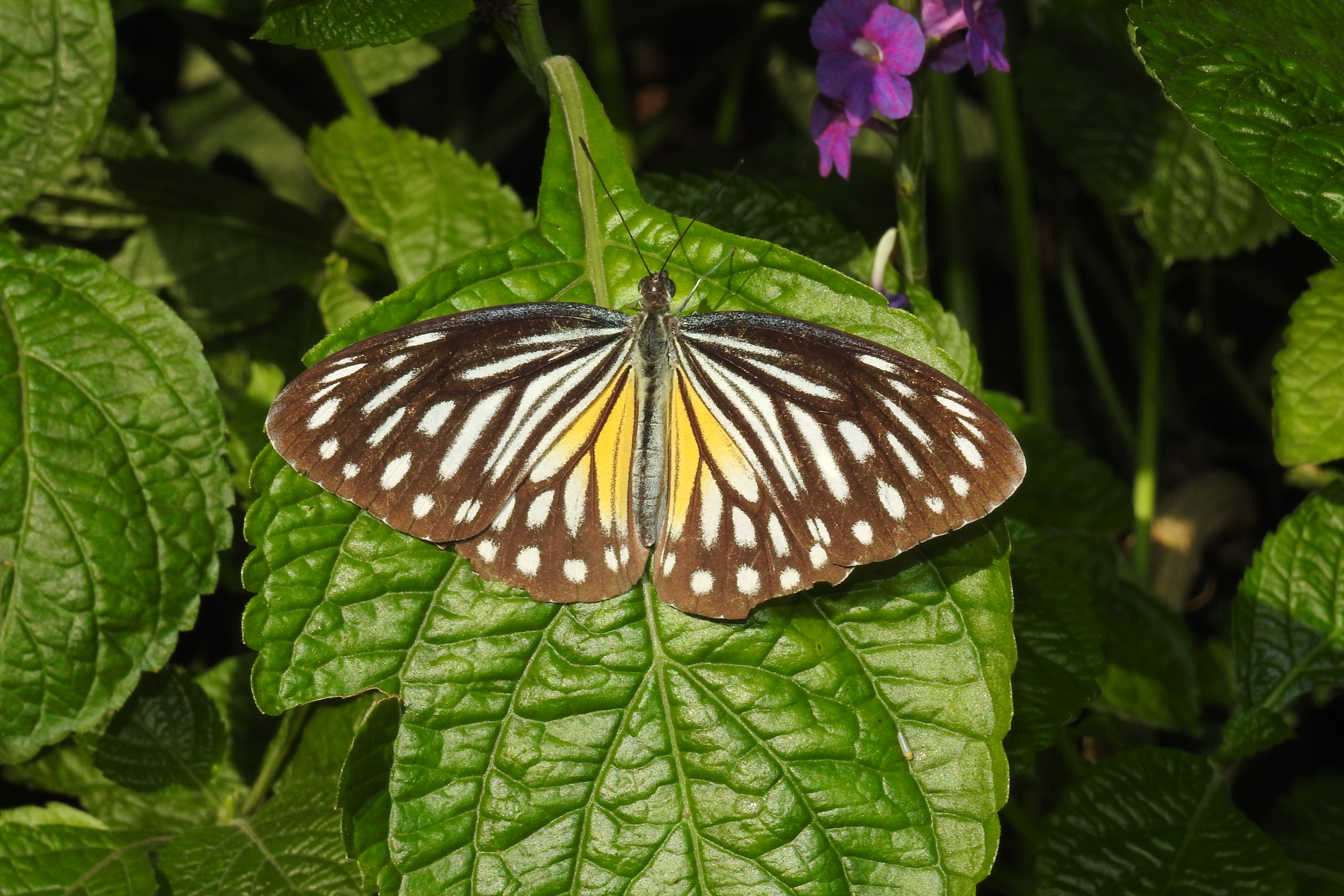
Dorsal view (female, form philomela)

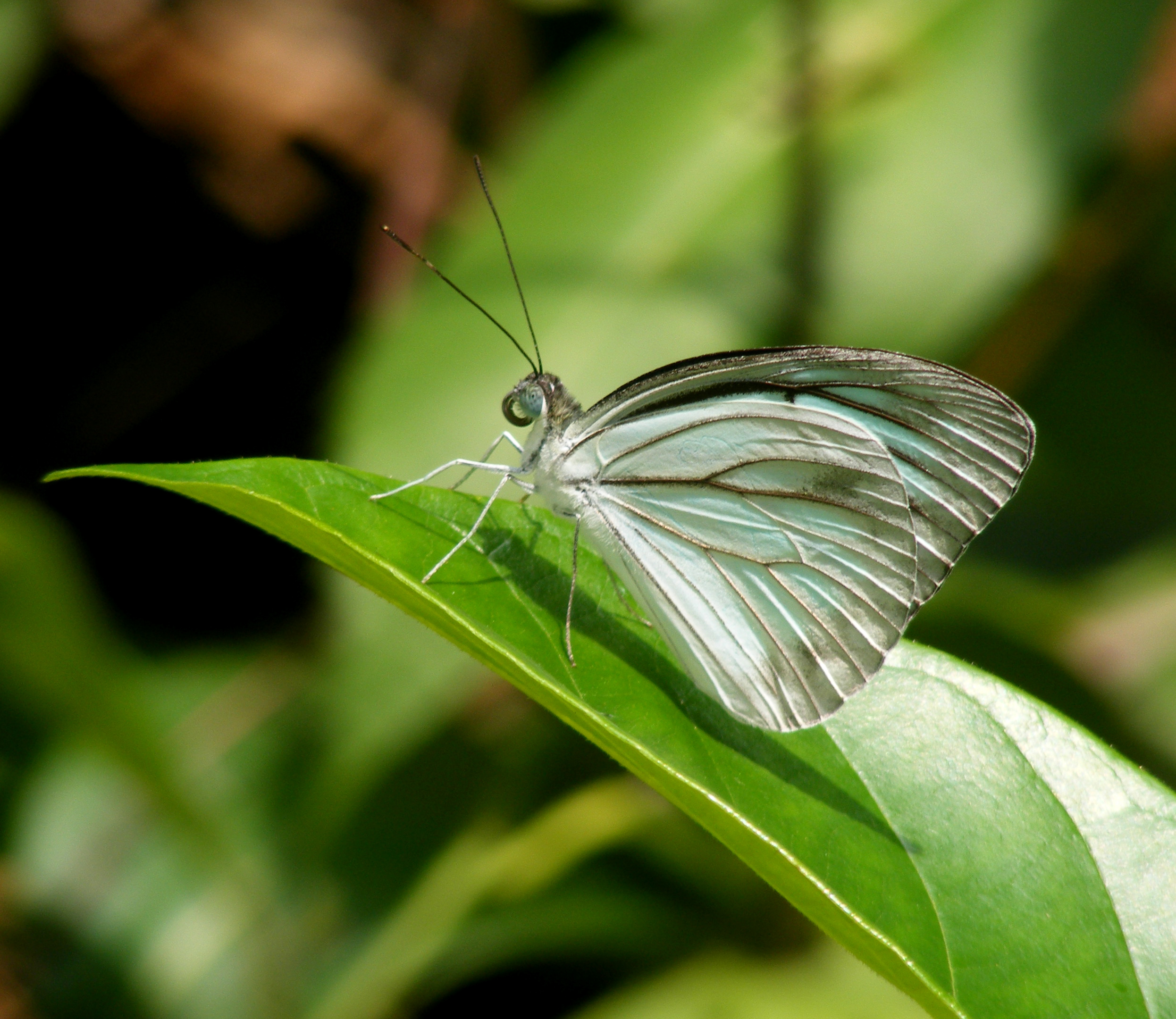
Ventral view (male)

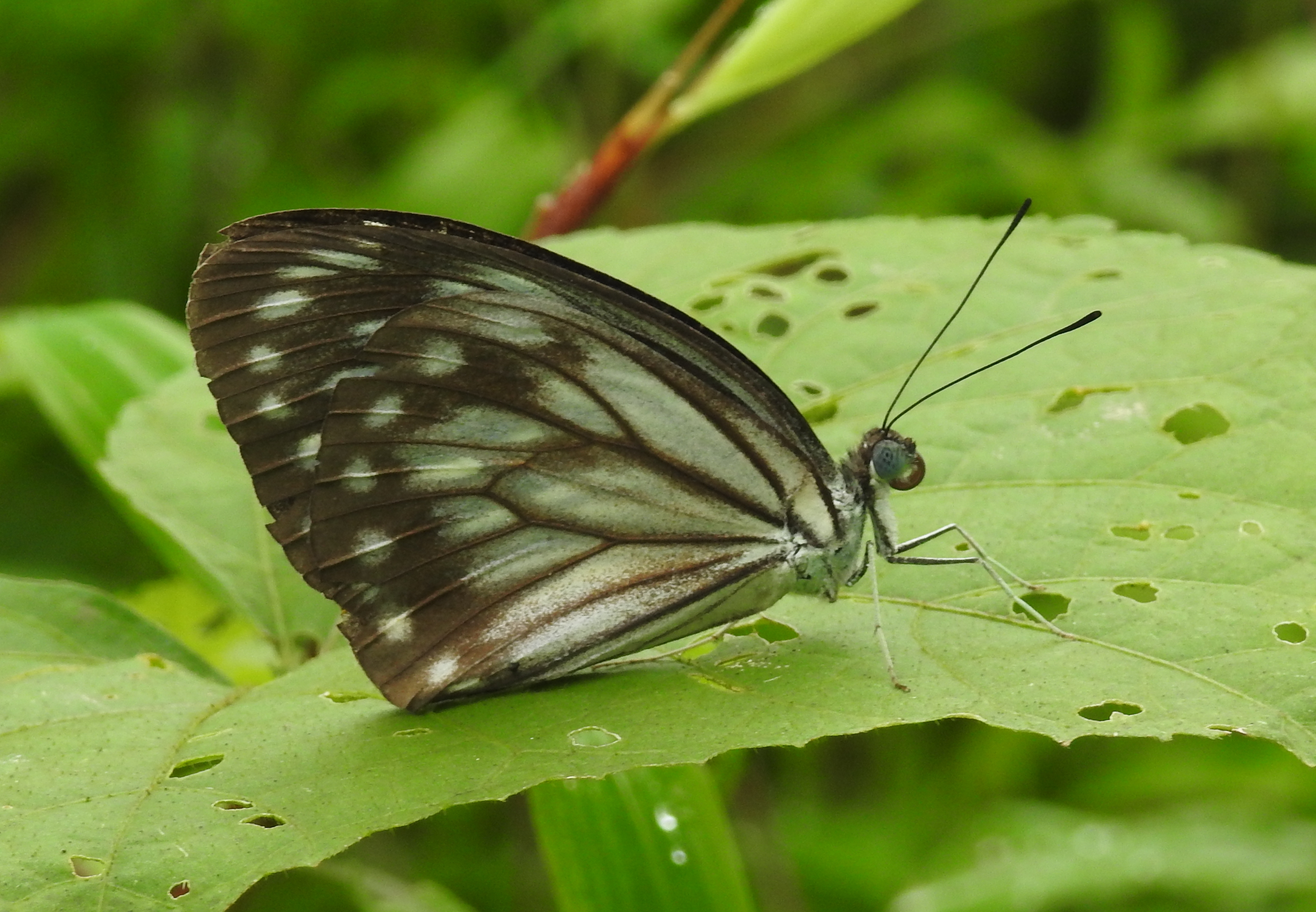
Ventral view (female)

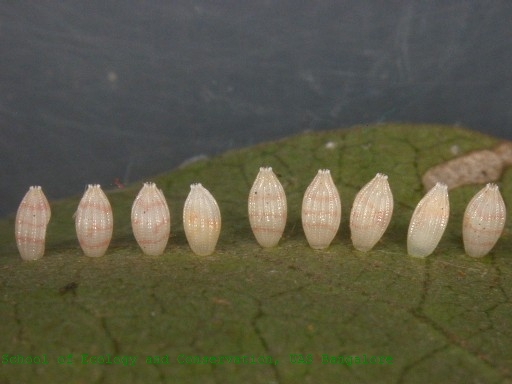
Eggs

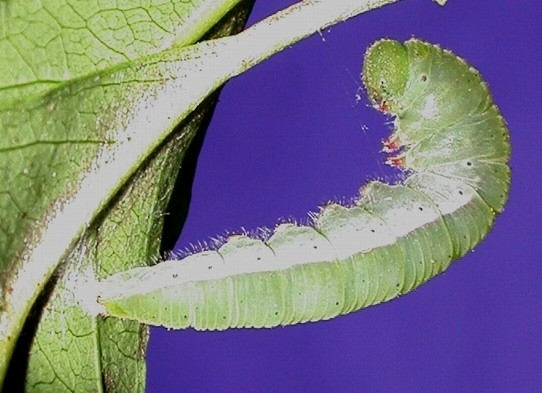
Prepupa

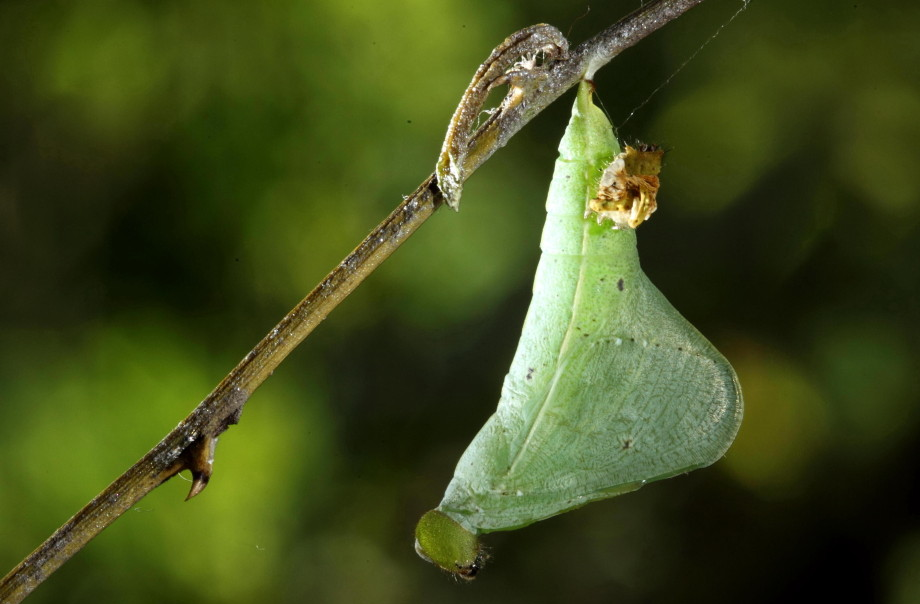
Pupa

==== Genus: Pieris (whites) ====
===== Pieris canidia (Indian cabbage white) =====
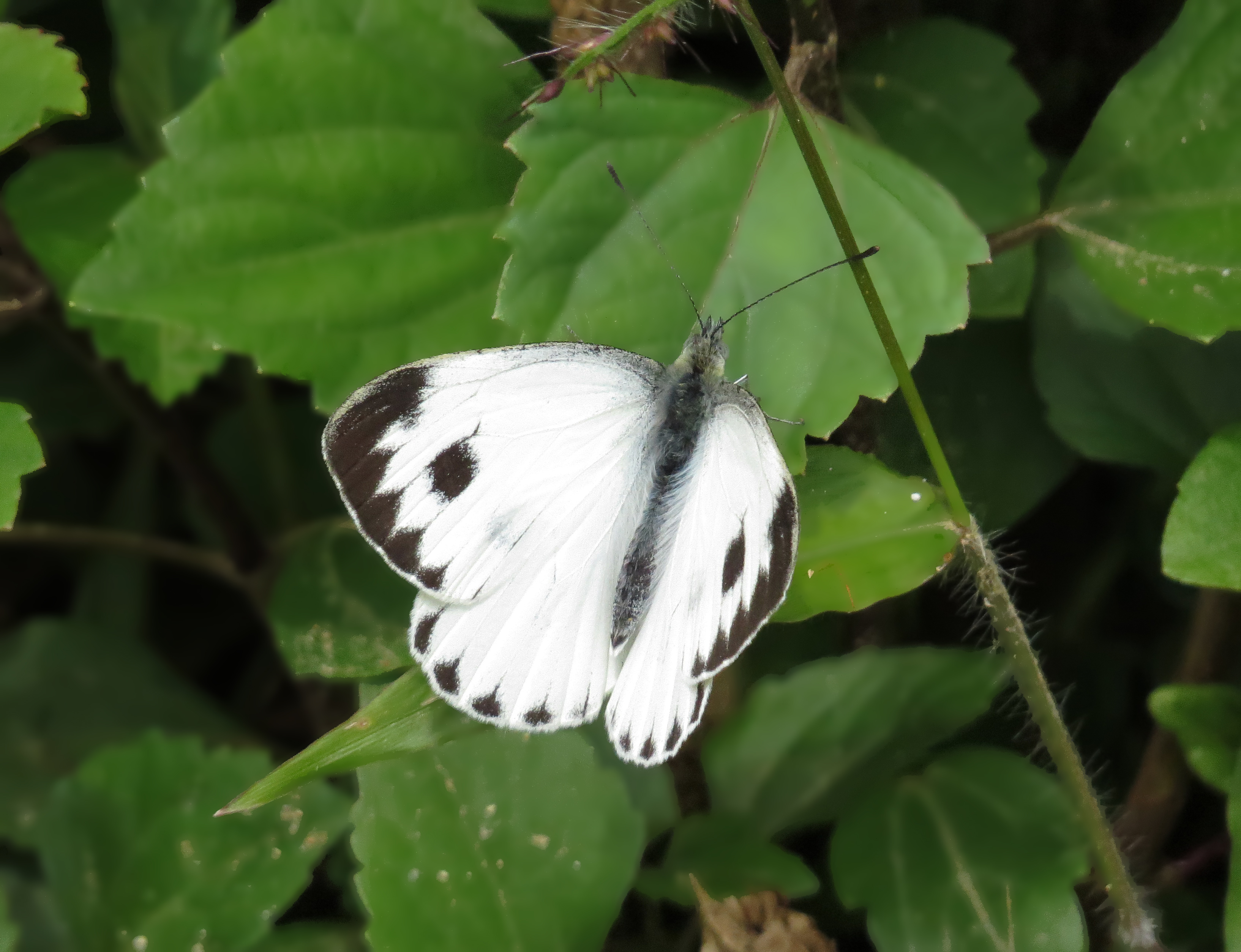
Dorsal view

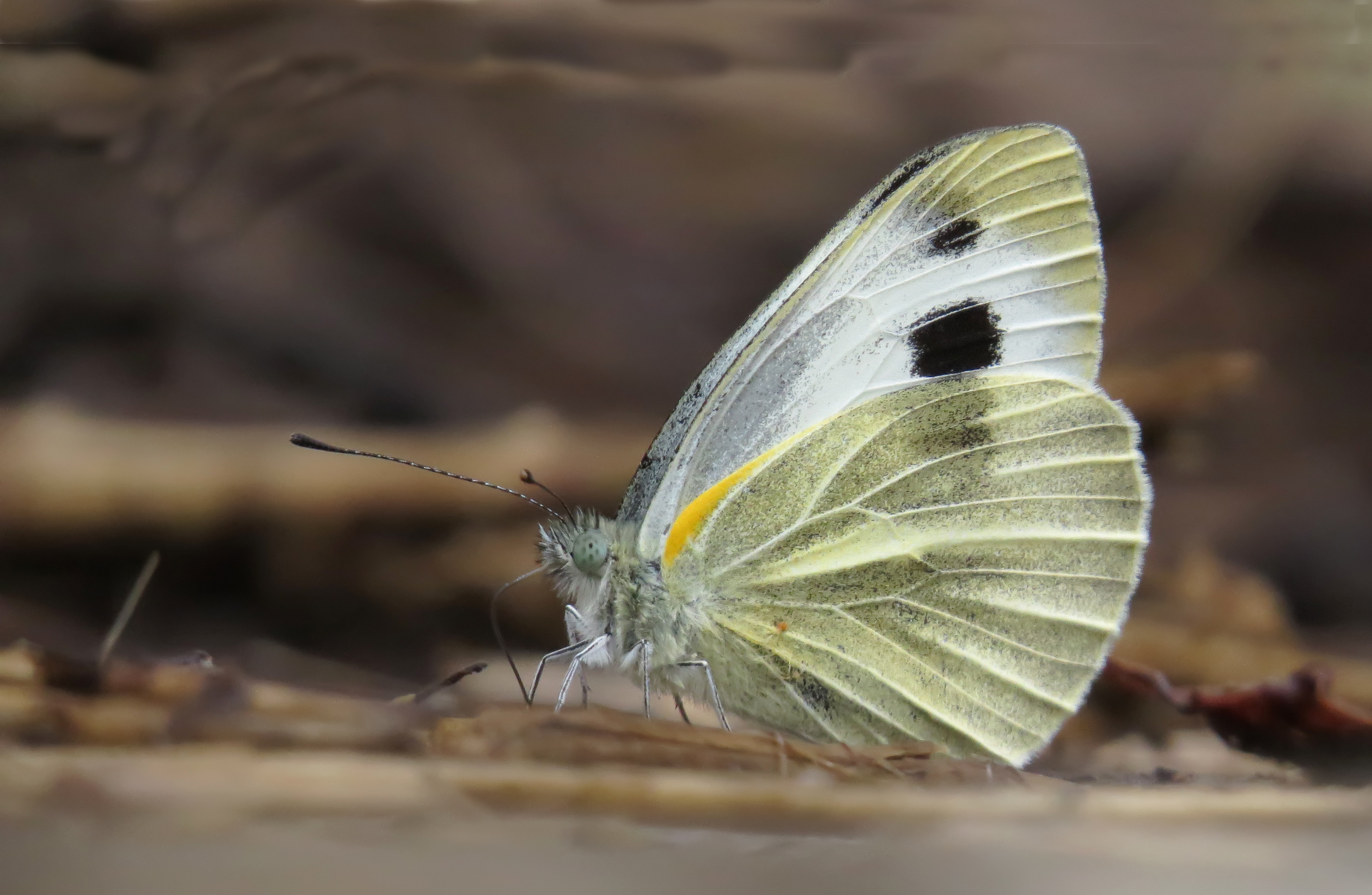
Ventral view

==== Genus: Prioneris (sawtooths) ====
===== Prioneris sita (painted sawtooth) =====
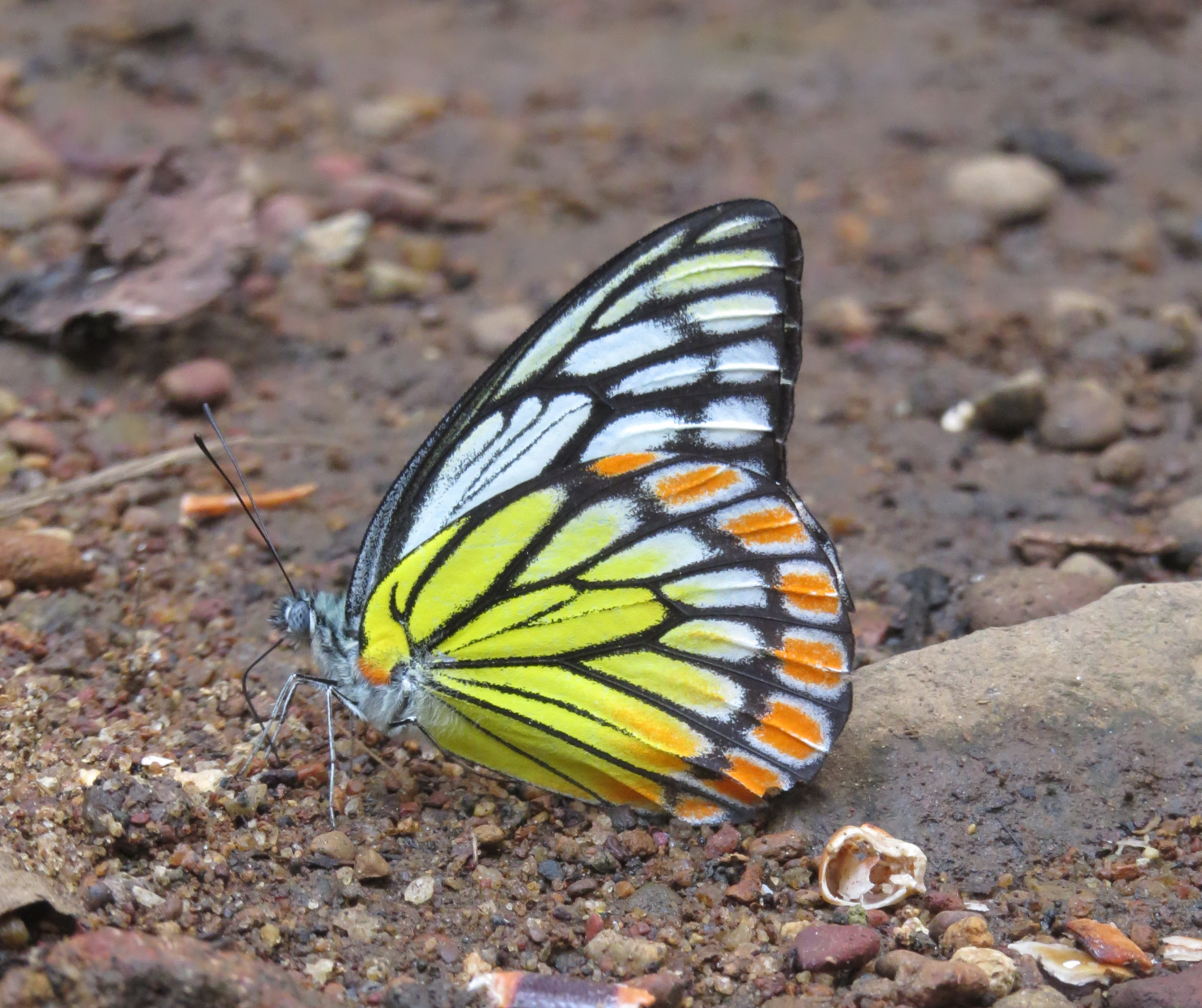
Ventral view

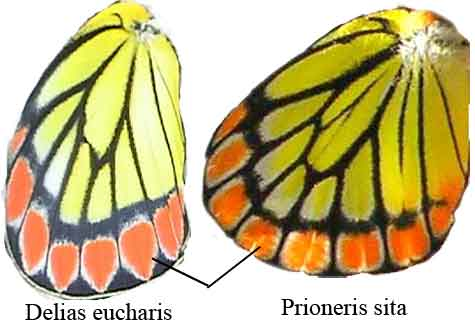
Wing images of Prioneris sita and Delias eucharis

== Family: Nymphalidae ==
=== Subfamily: Apaturinae ===
==== Genus: Euripus (courtesans) ====
===== Euripus consimilis (painted courtesan) =====
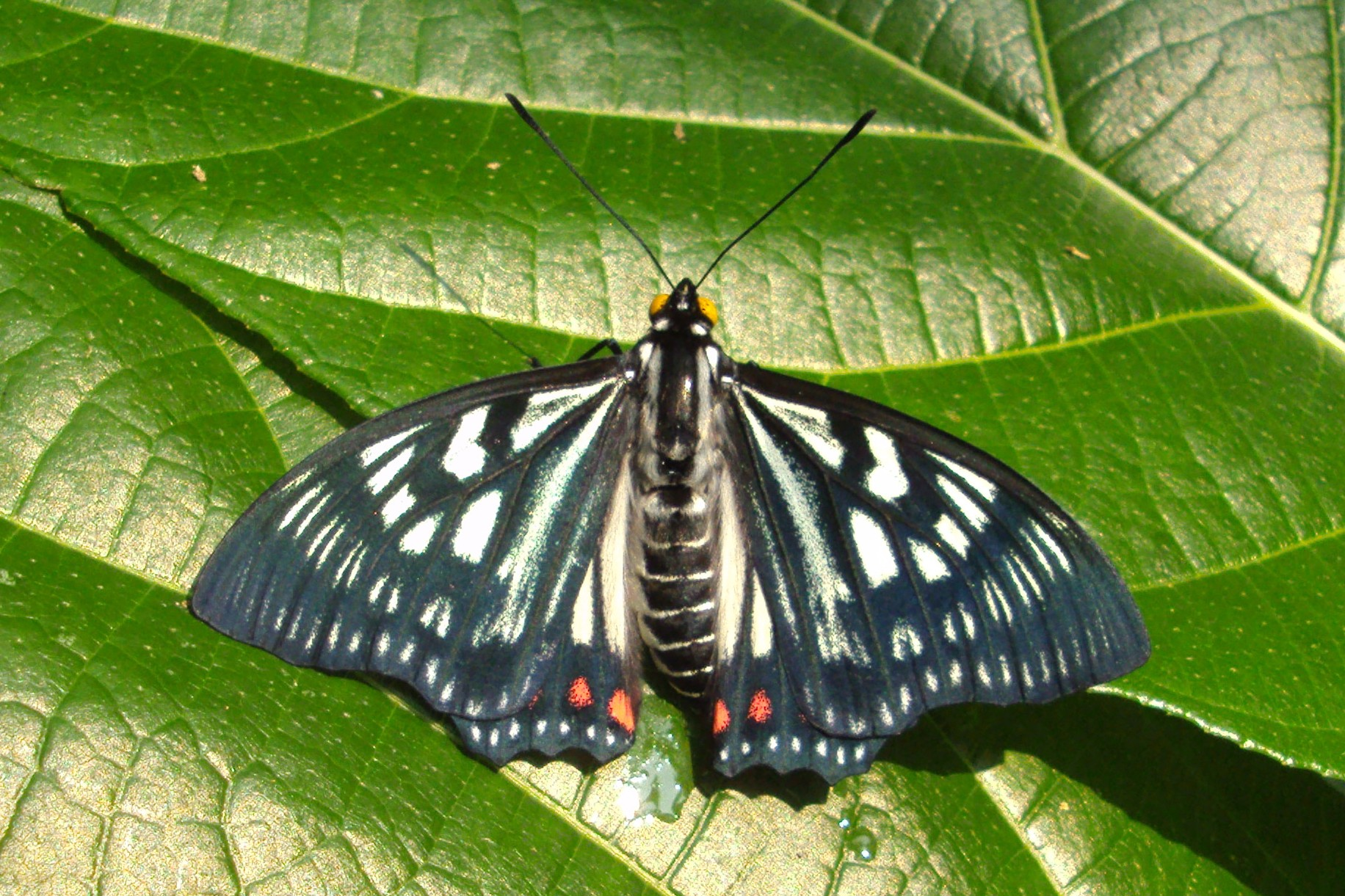
Dorsal view

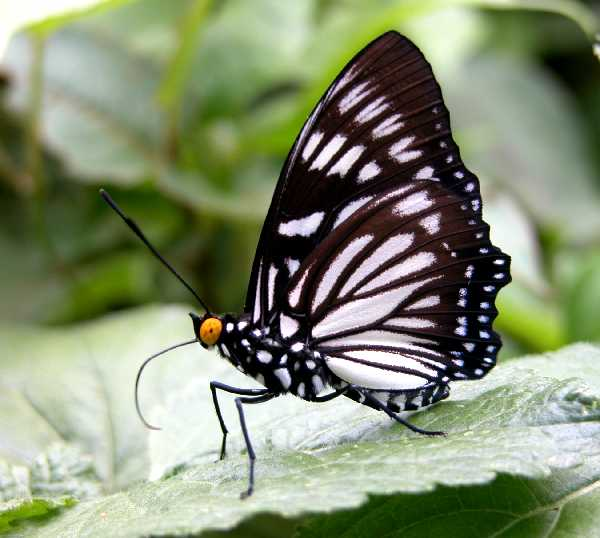
Ventral view

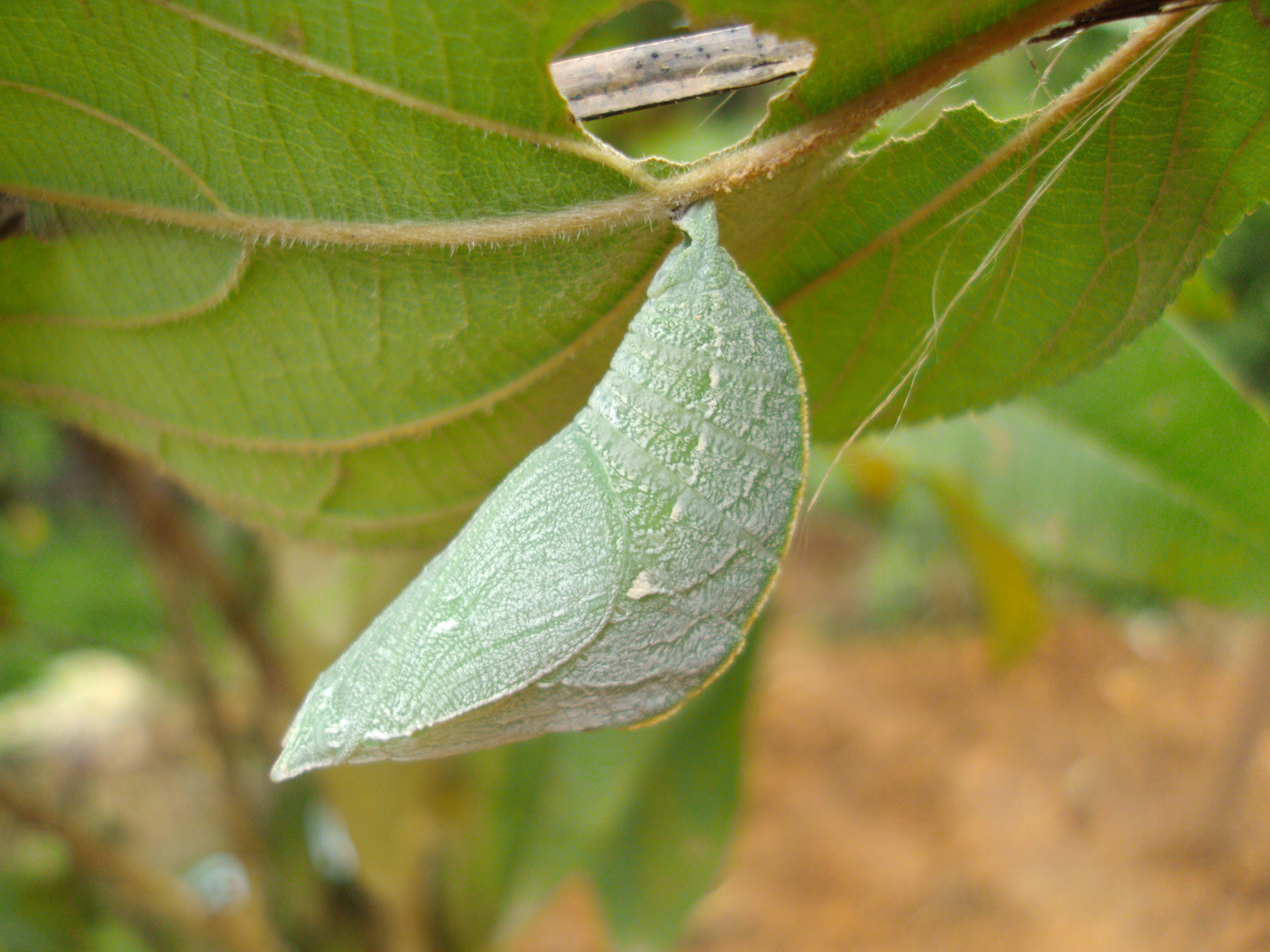
Pupa

==== Genus: Rohana (princes) ====
===== Rohana parisatis (black prince) =====
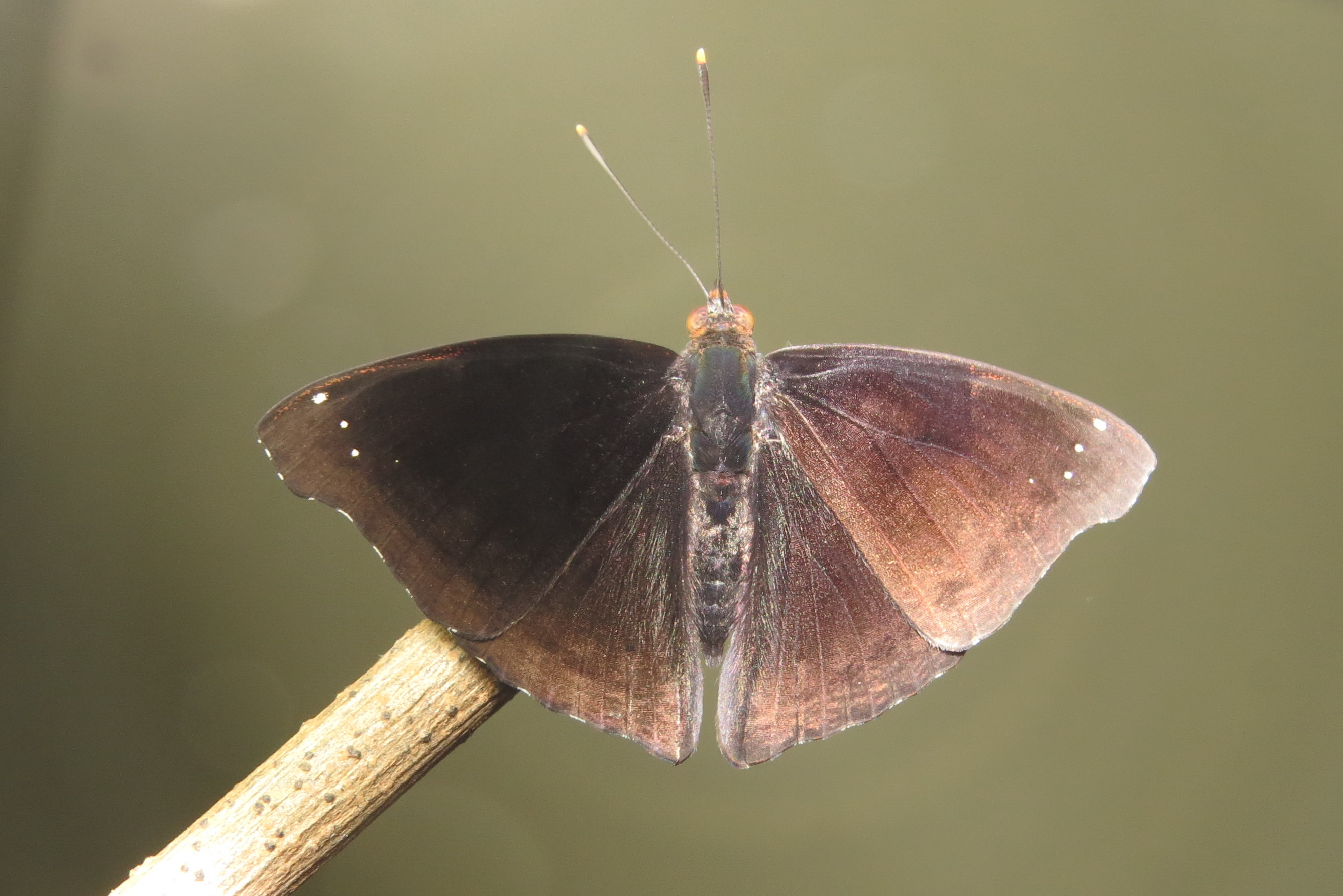
Male (dorsal view)

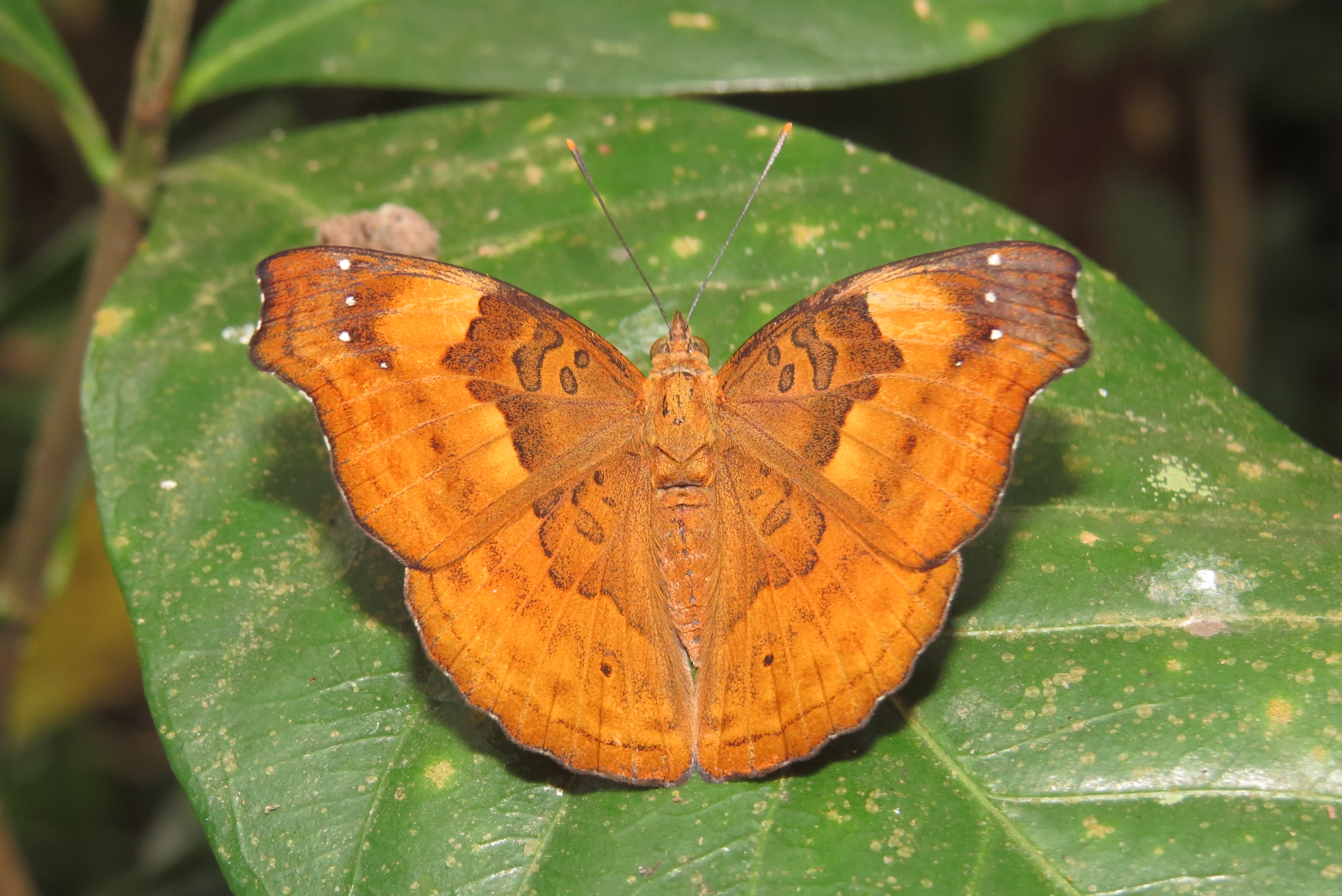
Female (dorsal view)

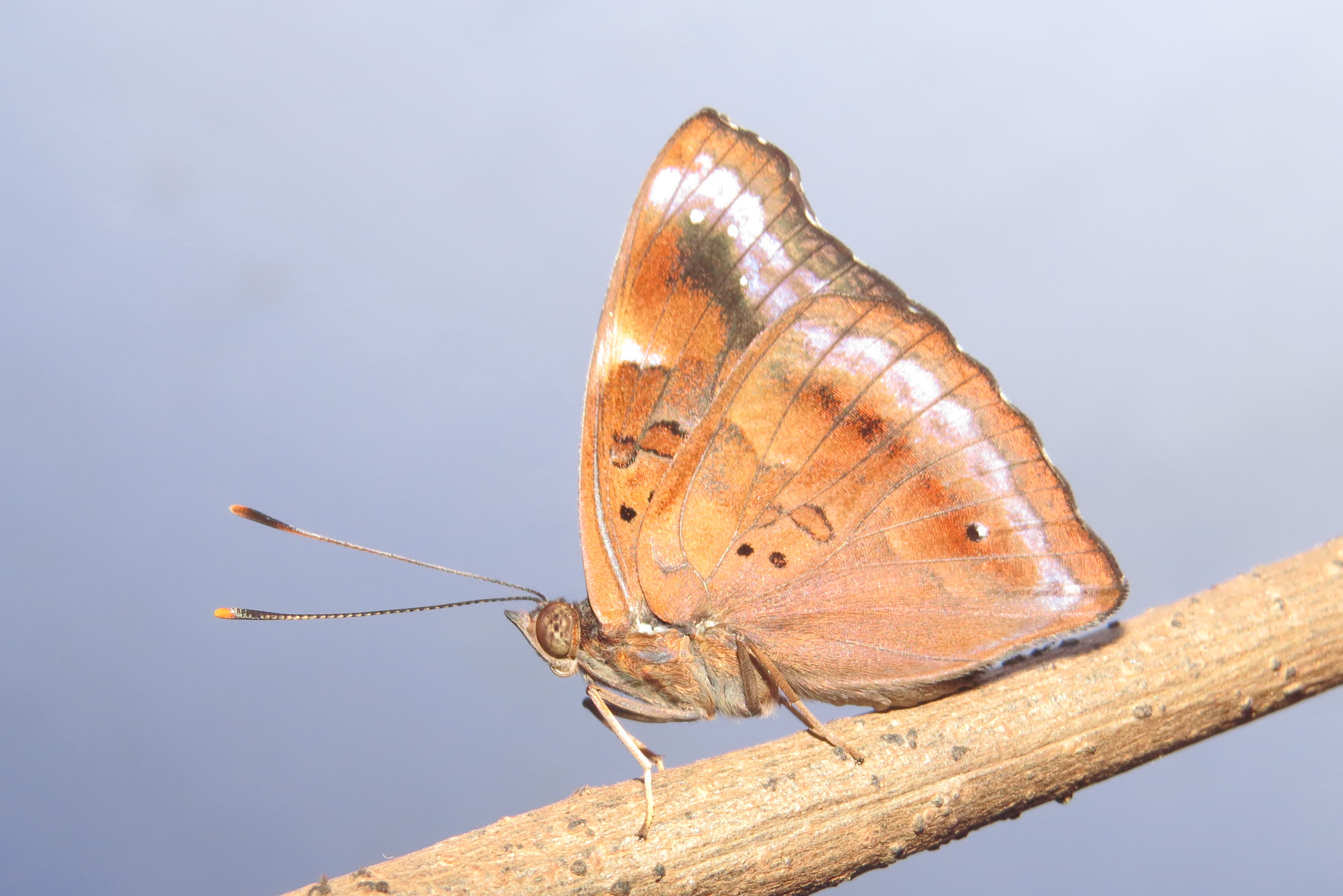
Male (ventral view)

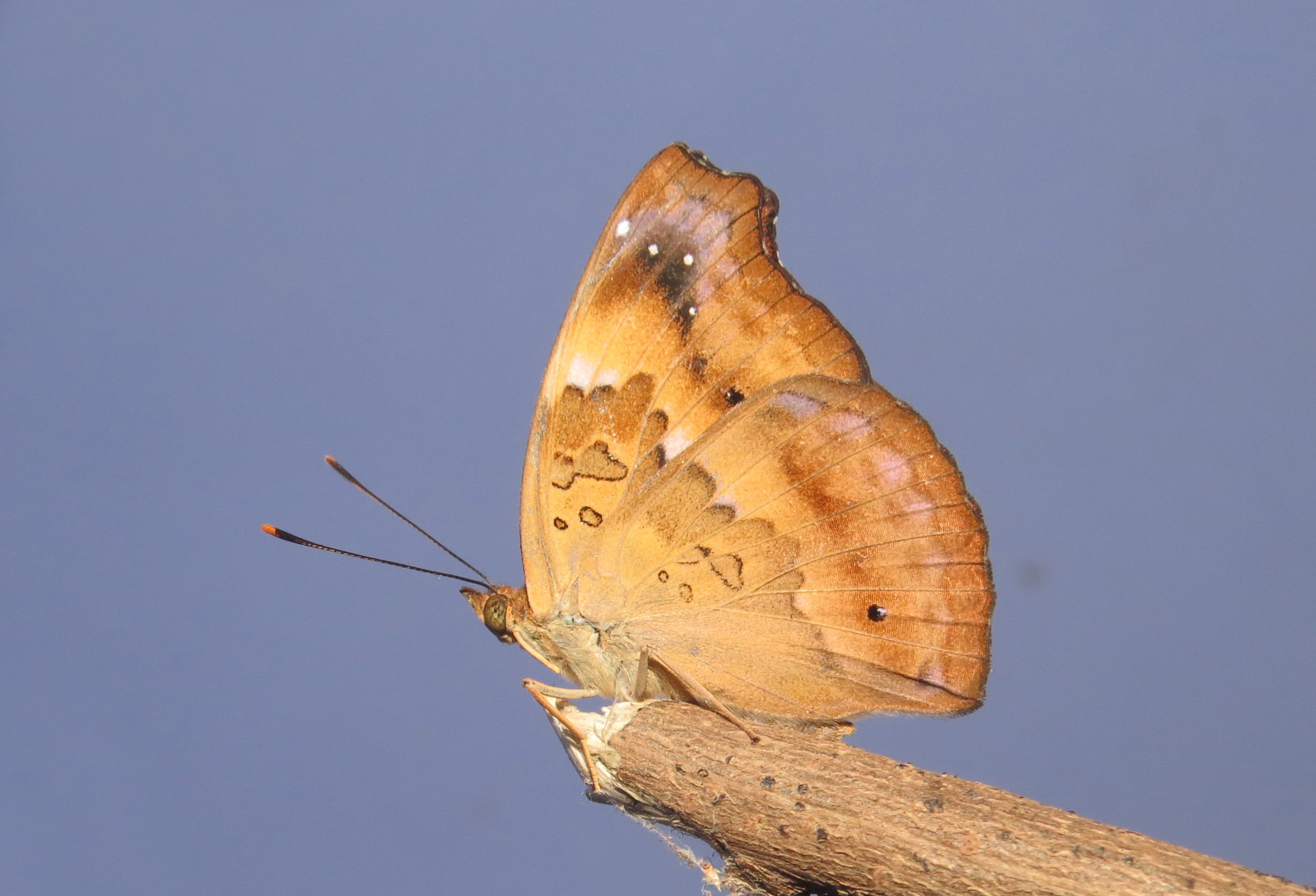
Female (ventral view)

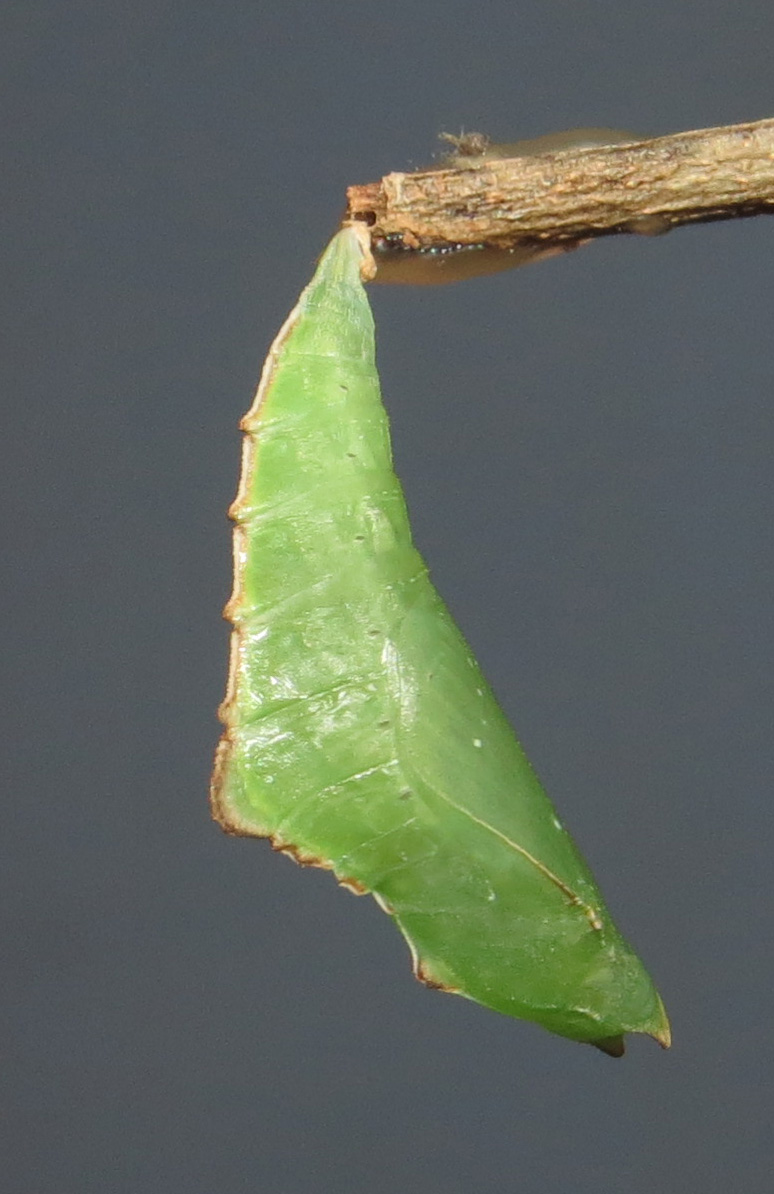
Pupa

=== Subfamily: Biblidinae ===
==== Genus: Ariadne (castors) ====
===== Ariadne ariadne (angled castor) =====
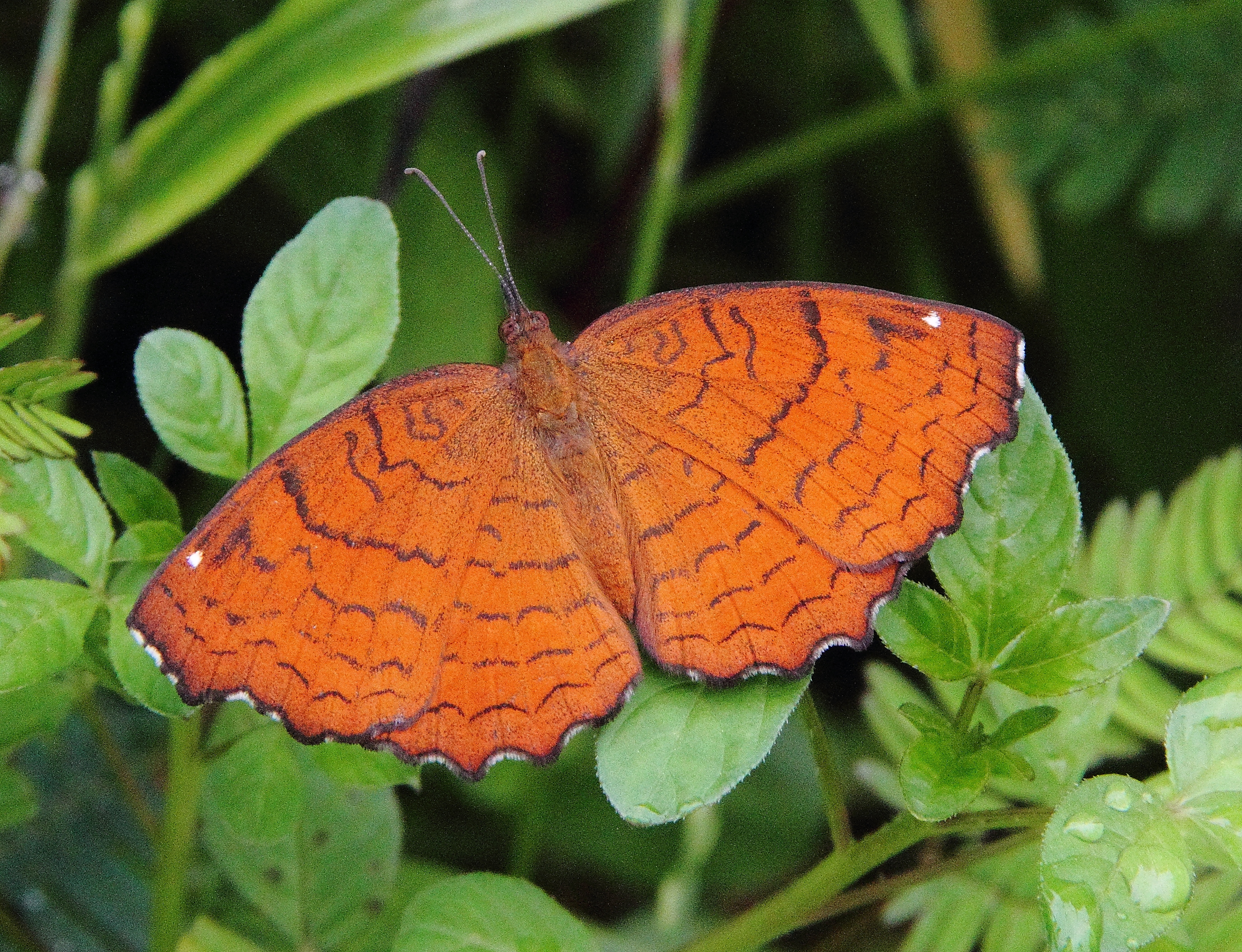
Dorsal view

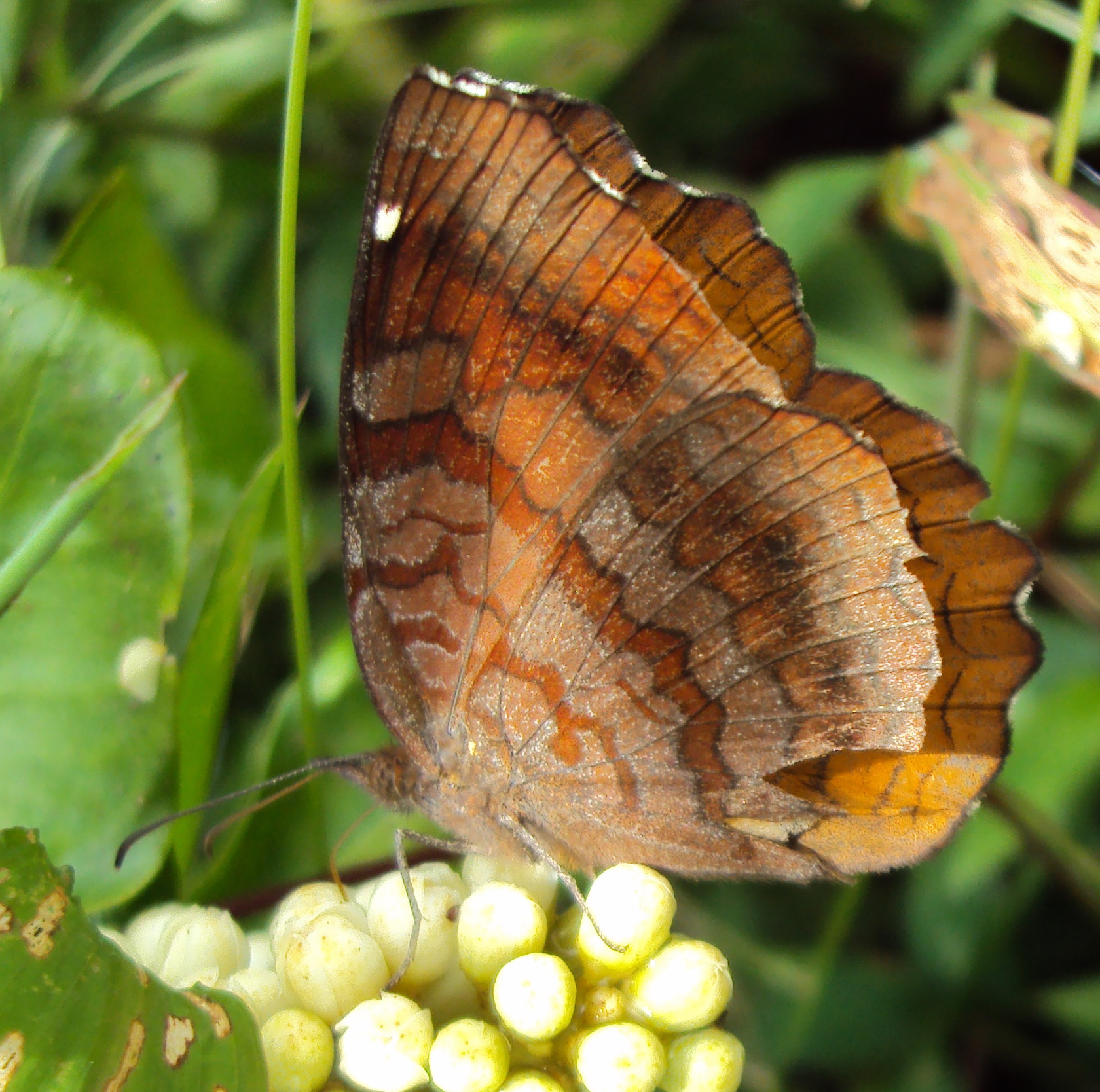
Ventral view

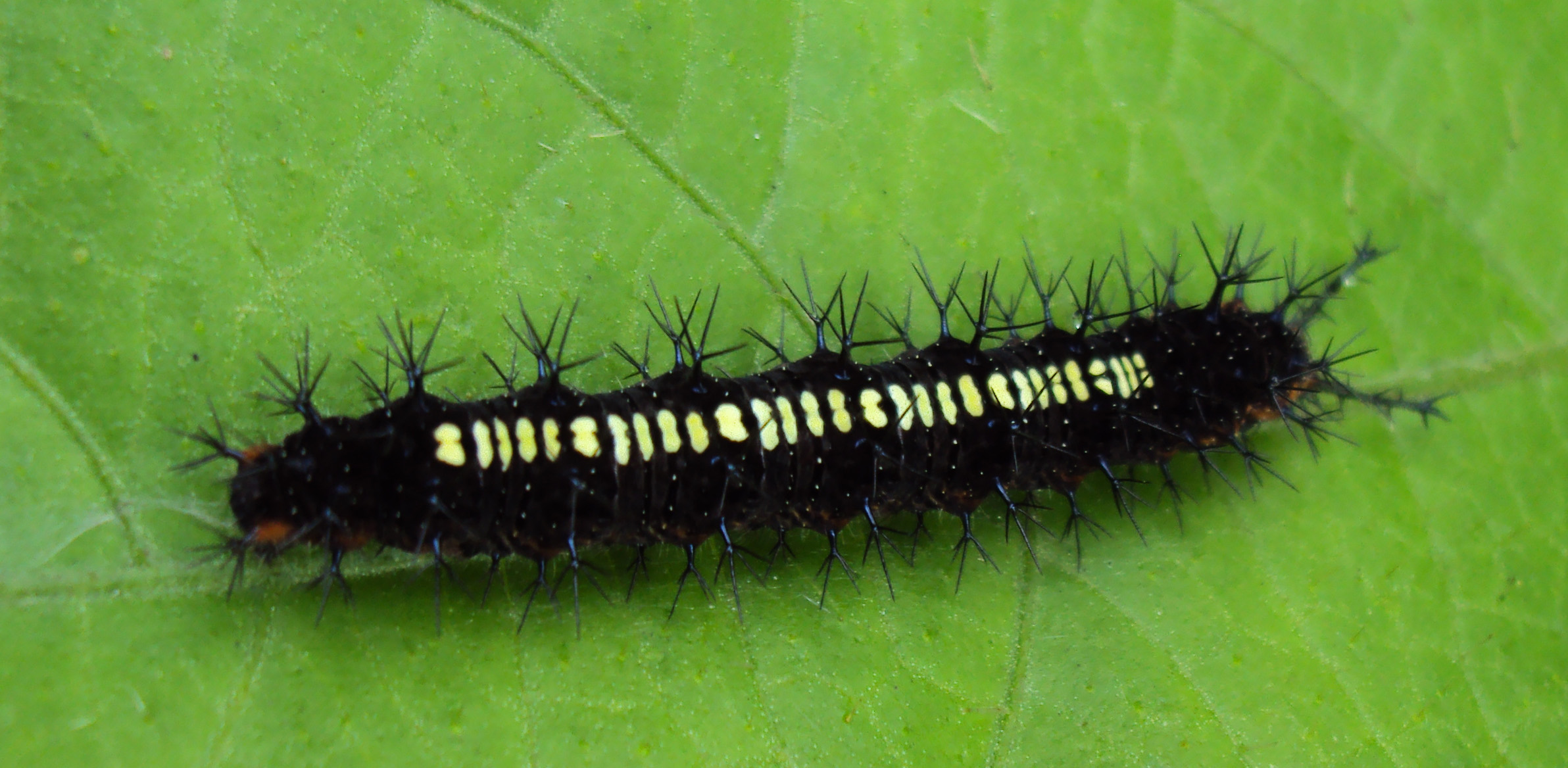
Larva

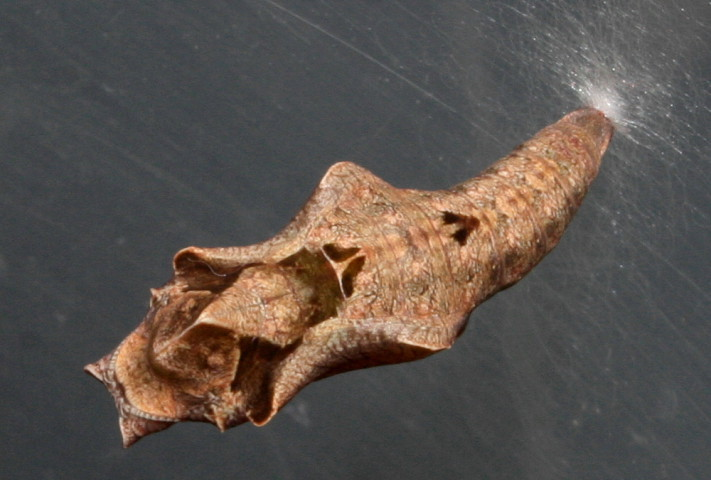
Pupa

===== Ariadne merione (common castor) =====
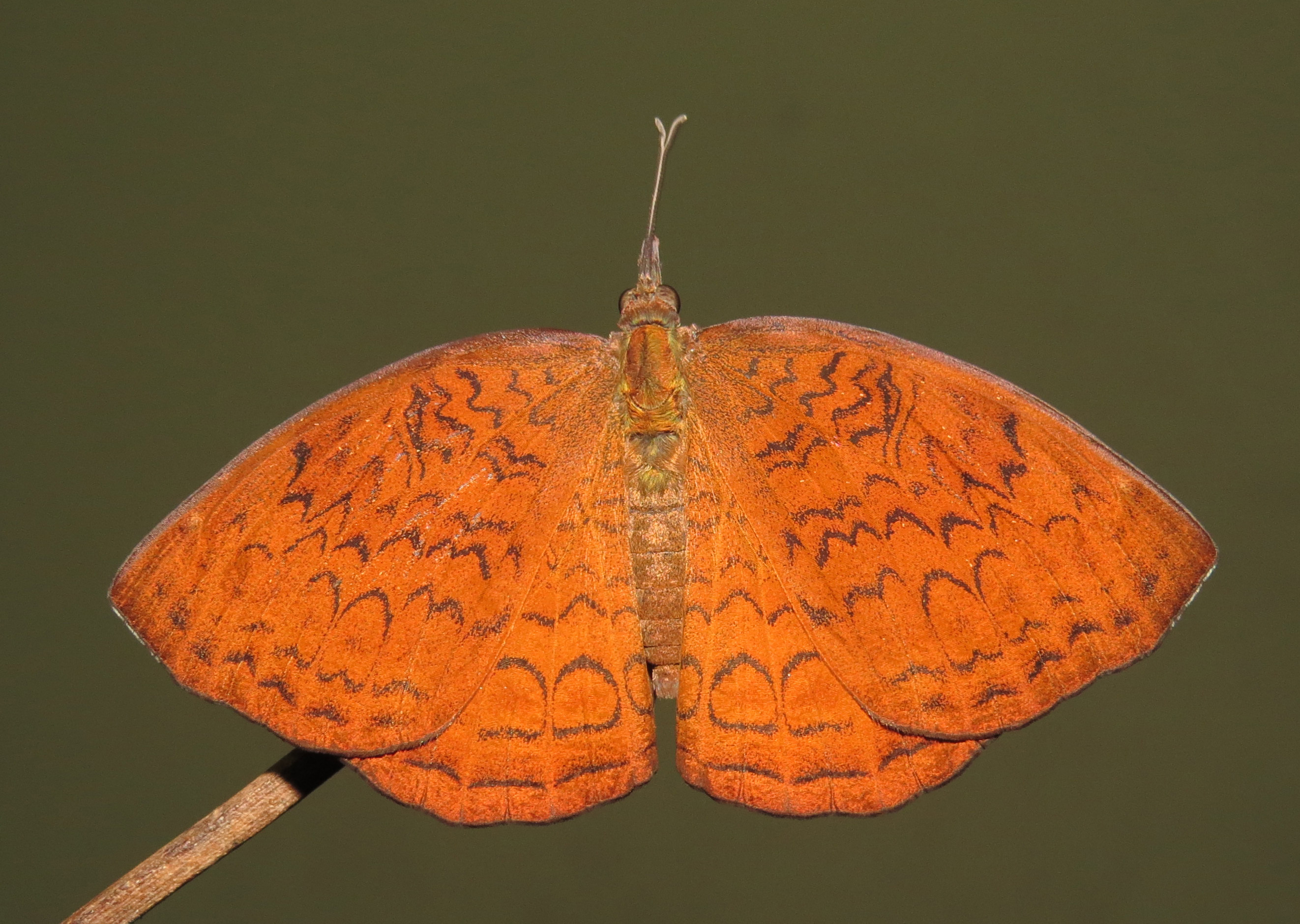
Dorsal view

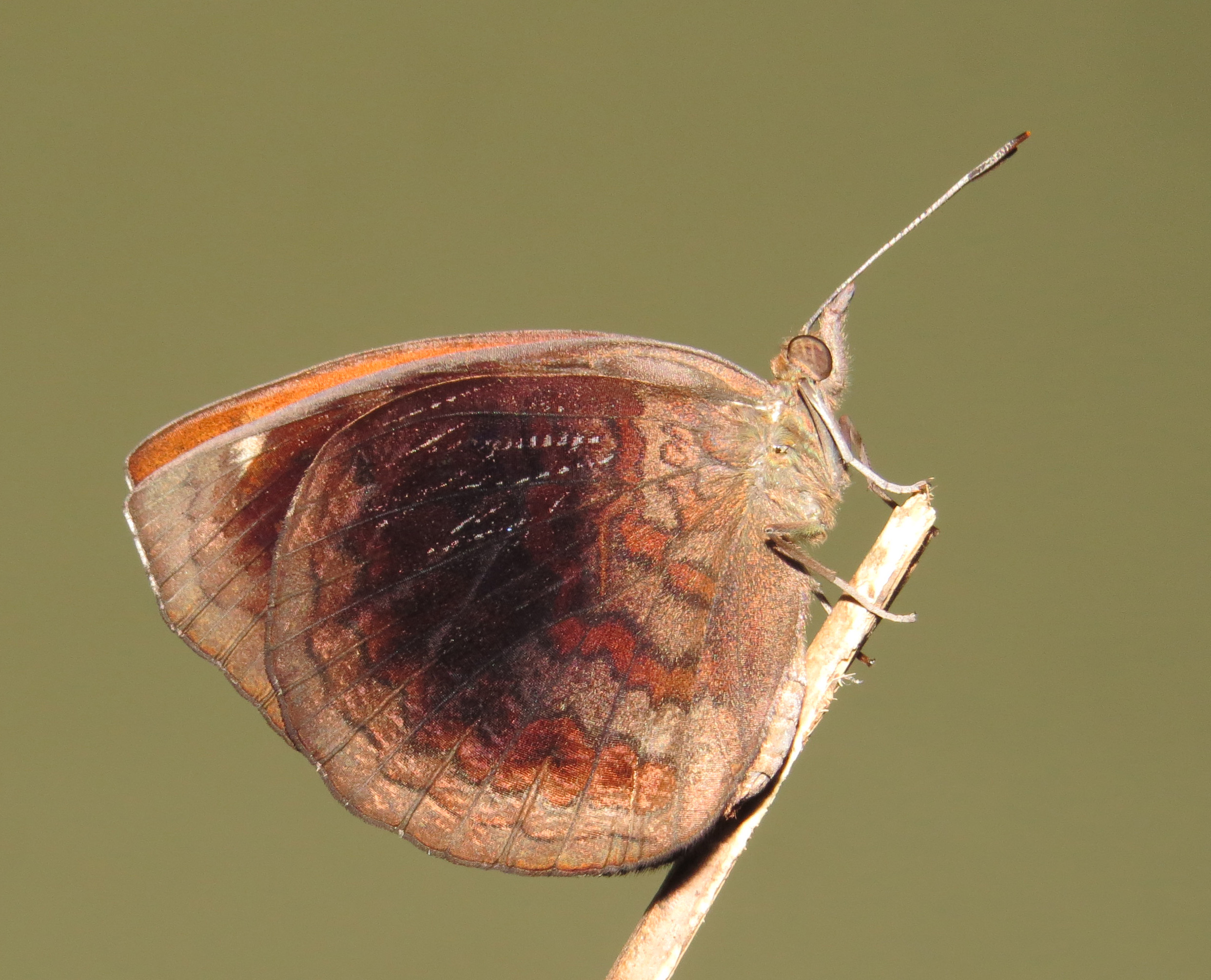
Ventral view

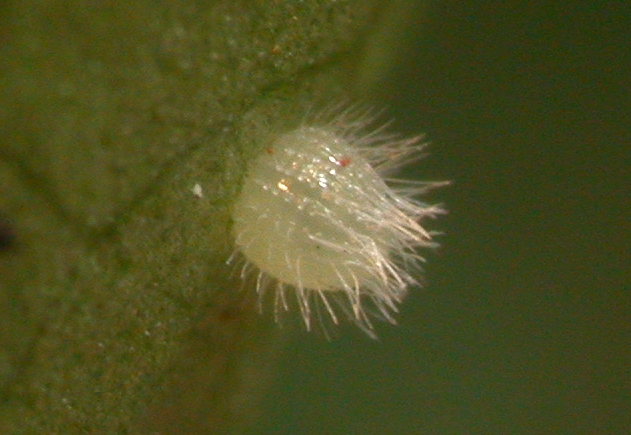
Egg

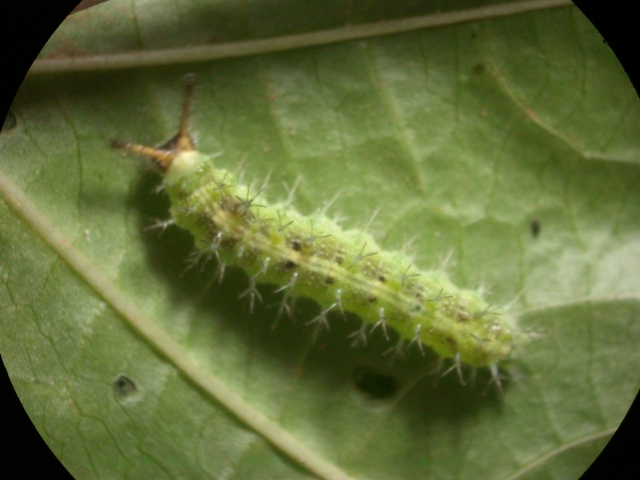
Larva

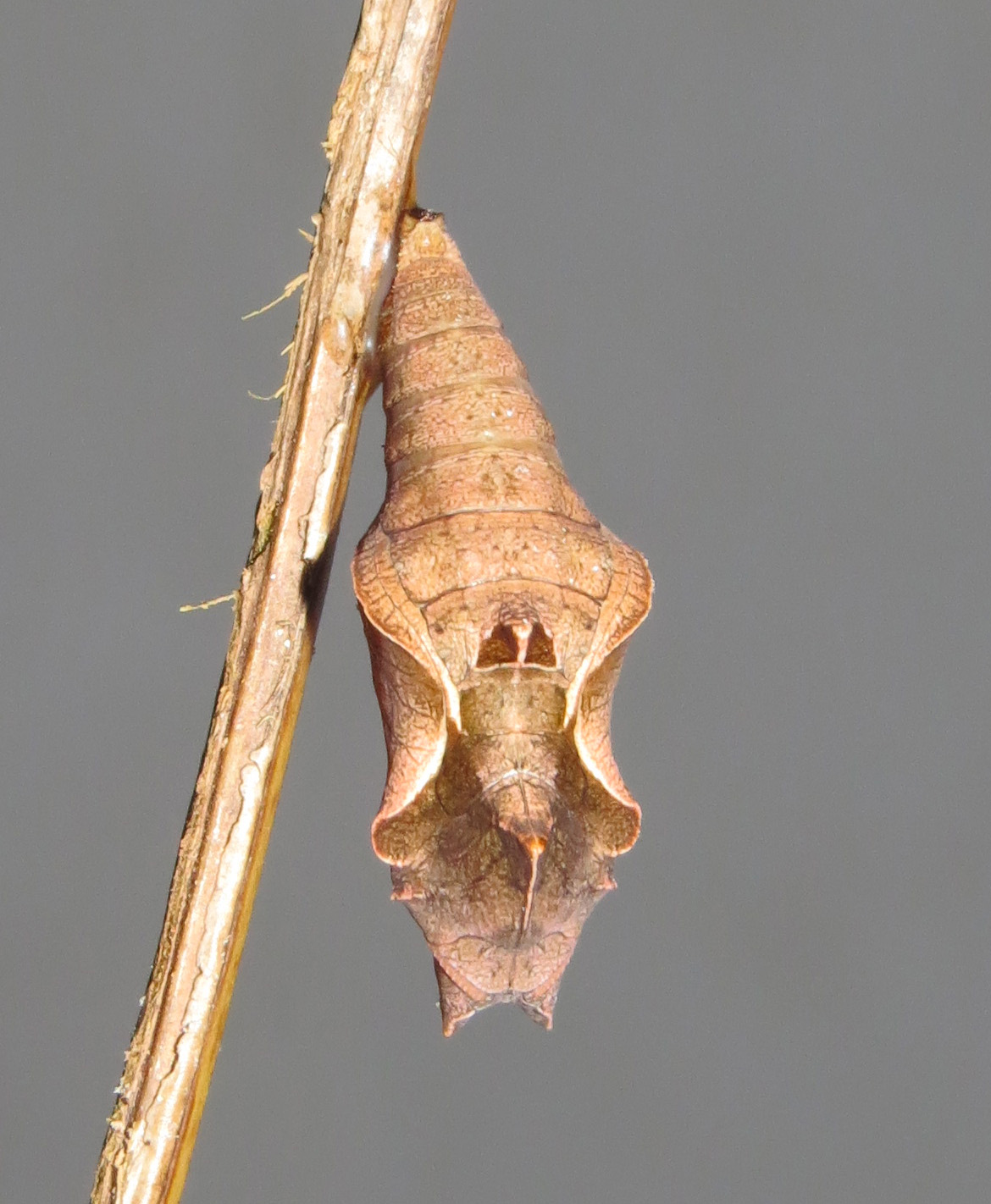
Pupa

==== Genus: Byblia (jokers) ====
===== Byblia ilithyia (joker) =====
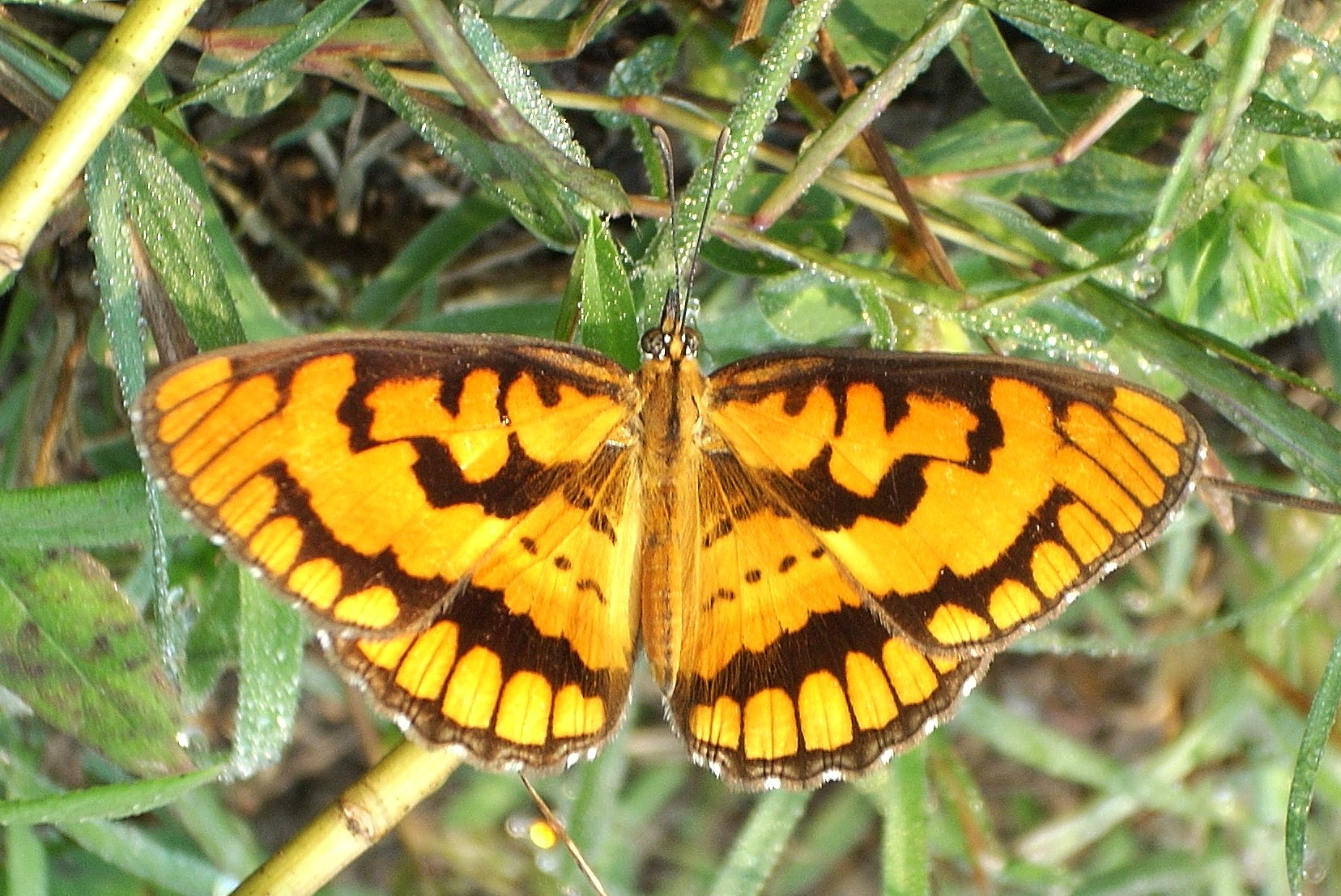
Dorsal view

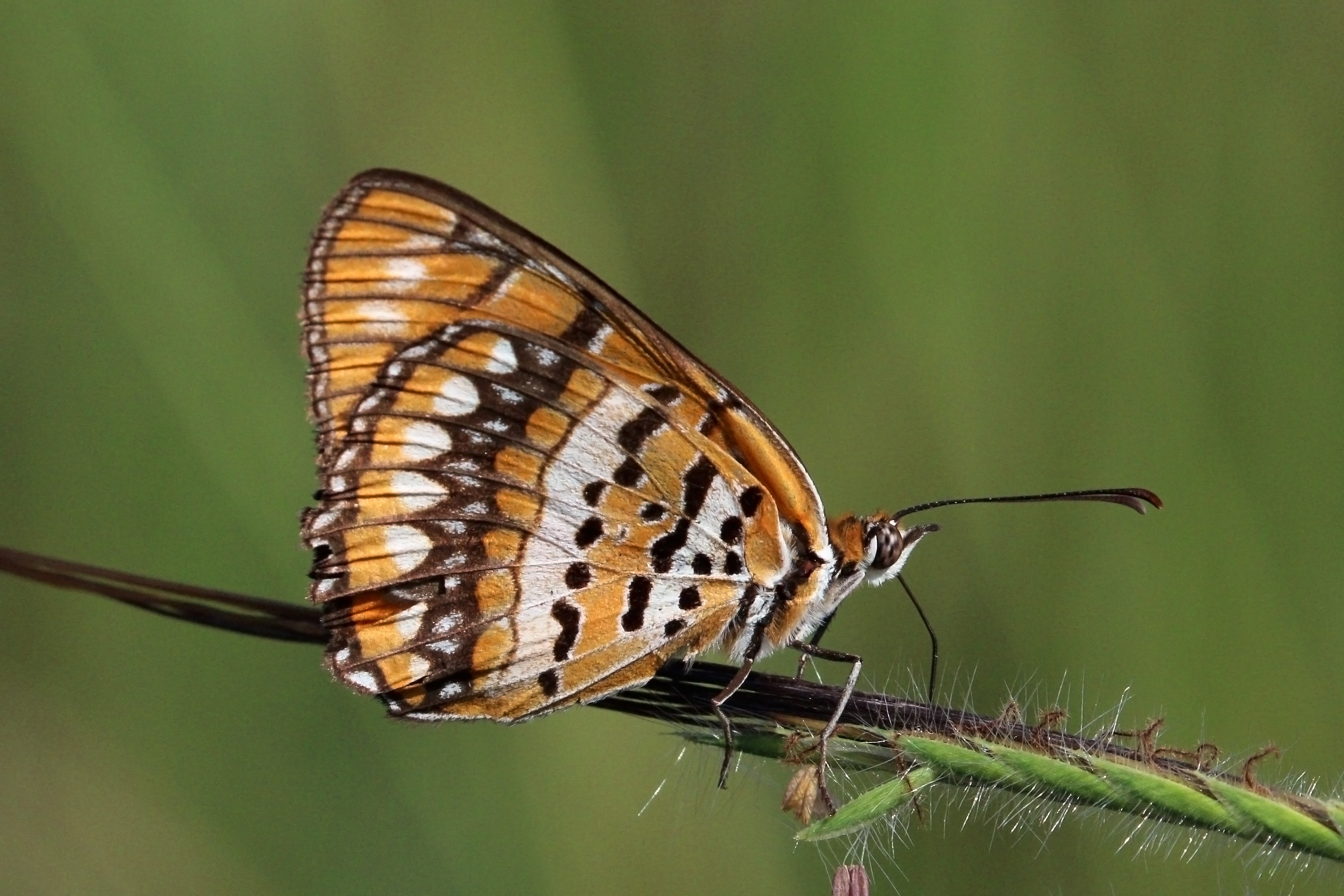
Ventral view

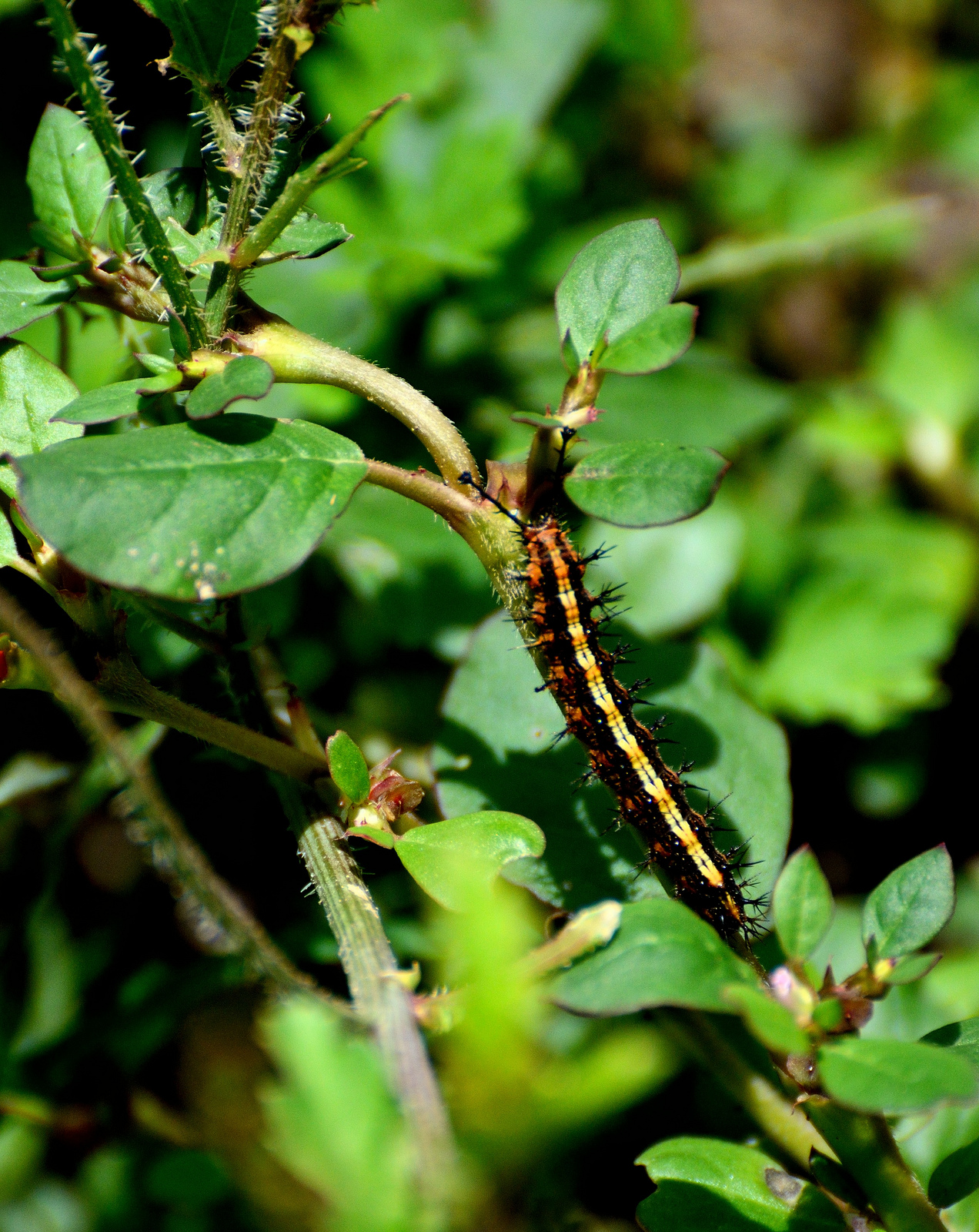
Larva

=== Subfamily: Charaxinae ===
==== Genus: Charaxes (rajahs and nawabs) ====
===== Charaxes agrarius (anomalous nawab) =====
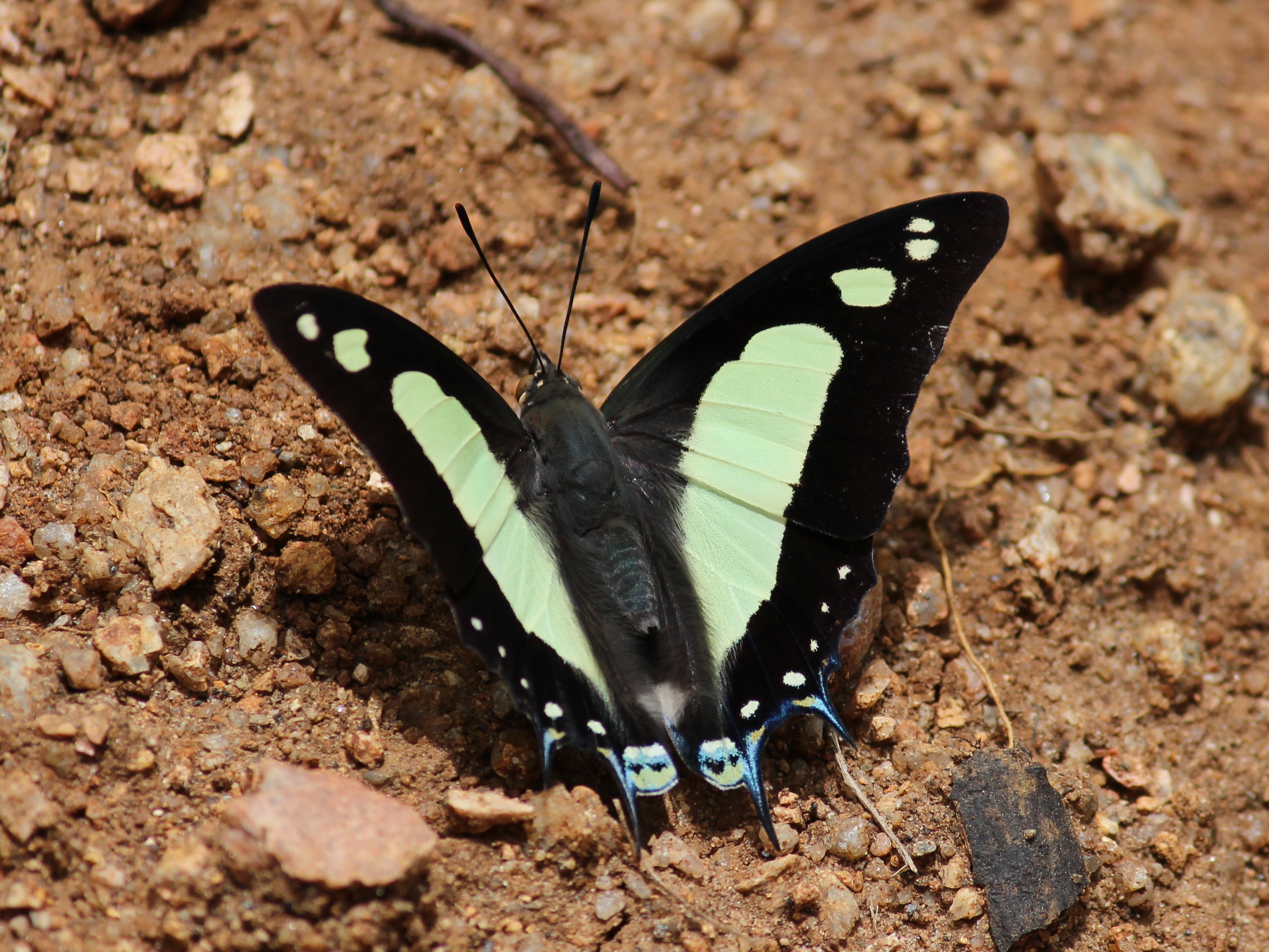
Dorsal view with one apical spot missing (left)

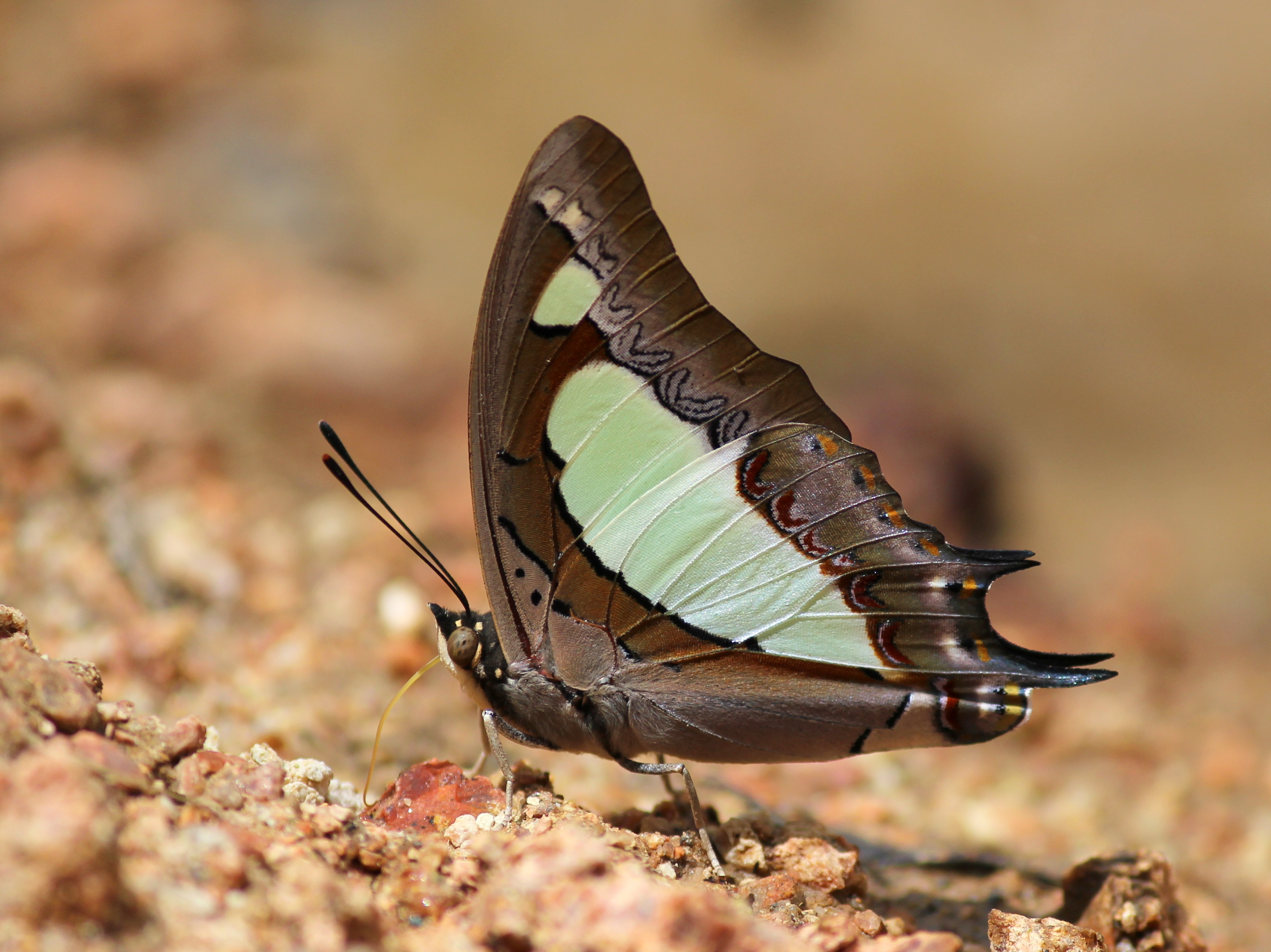
Ventral view

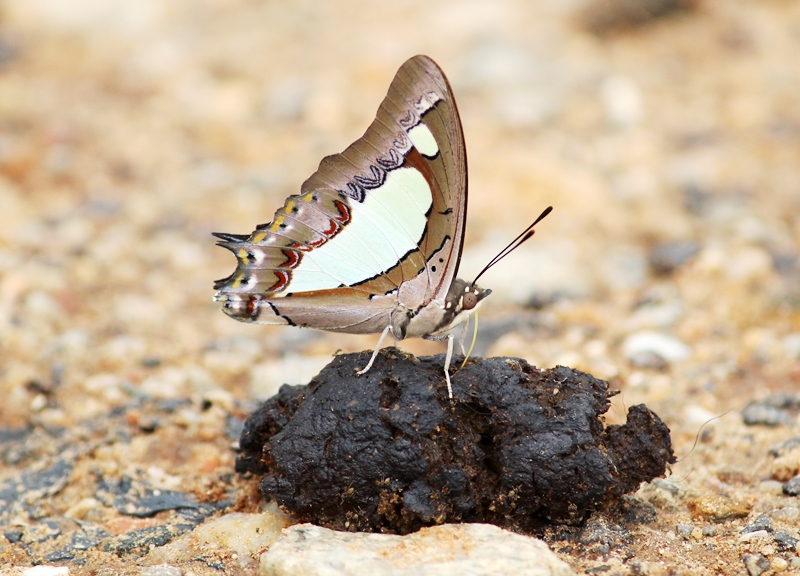
Ventral view

===== Charaxes athamas/bharata (common/Indian nawab) =====
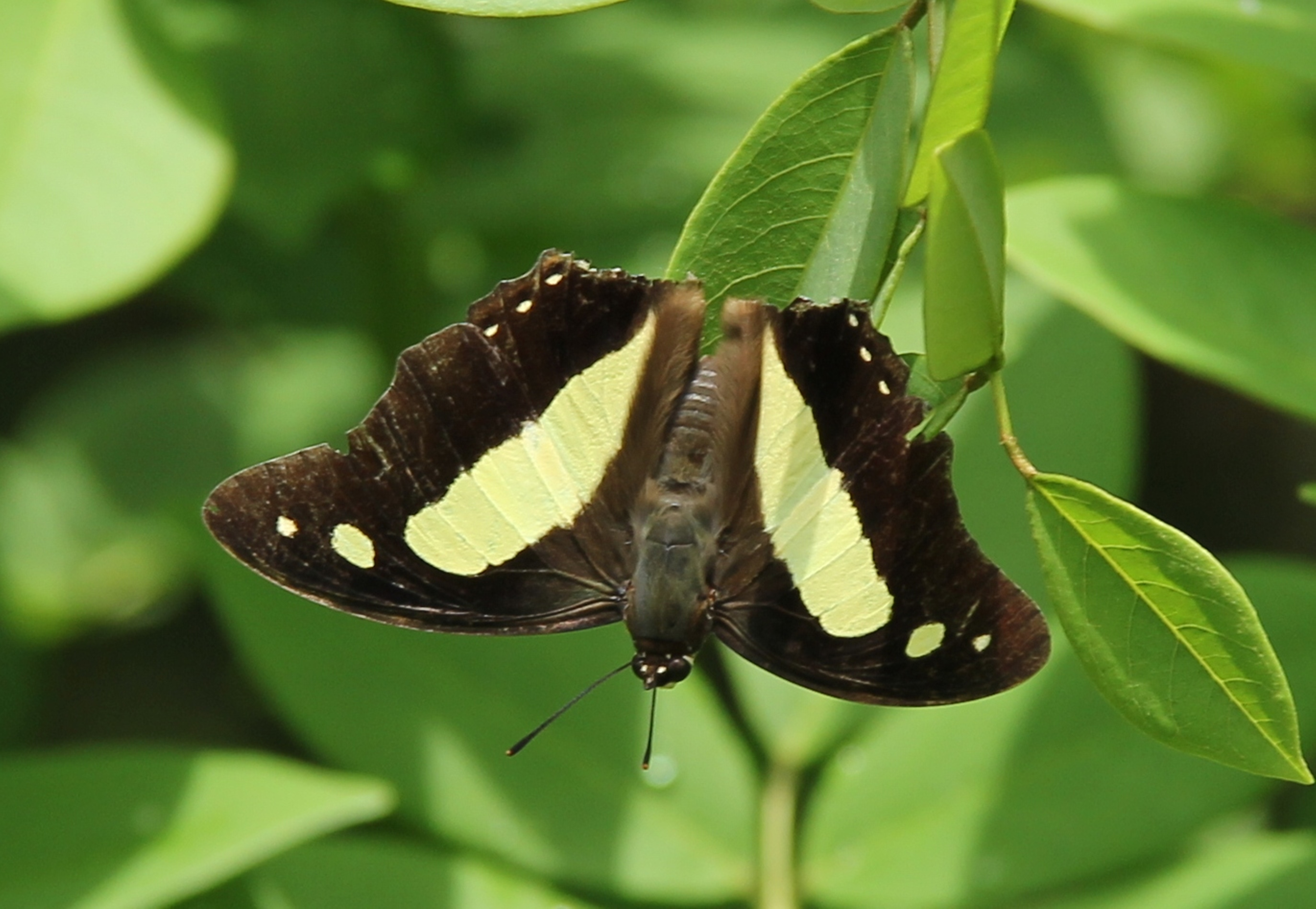
Dorsal view

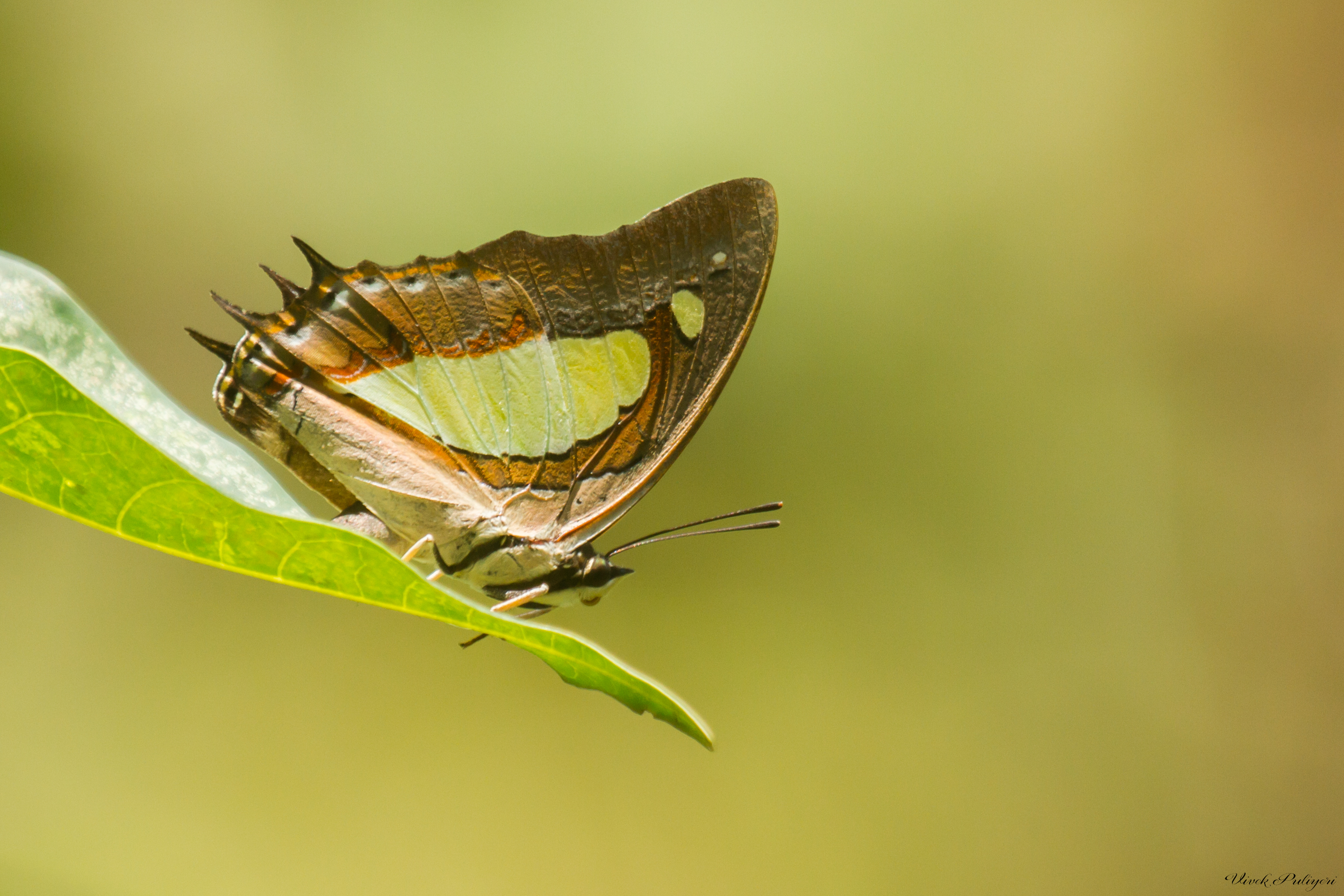
Ventral view

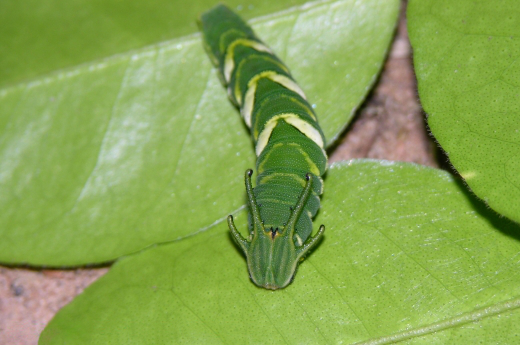
Larva

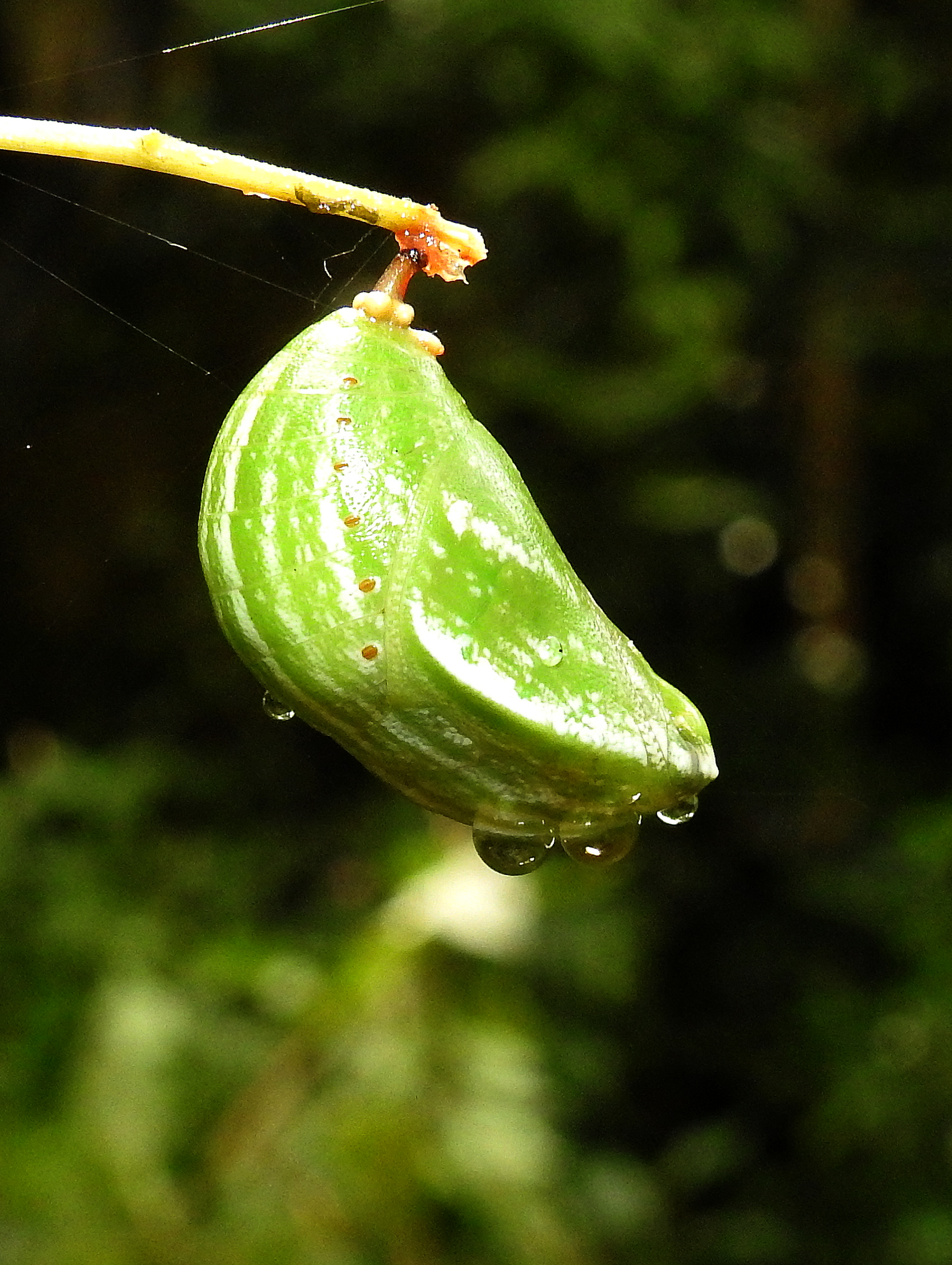
Chrysalis

===== Charaxes psaphon (plain tawny rajah) =====
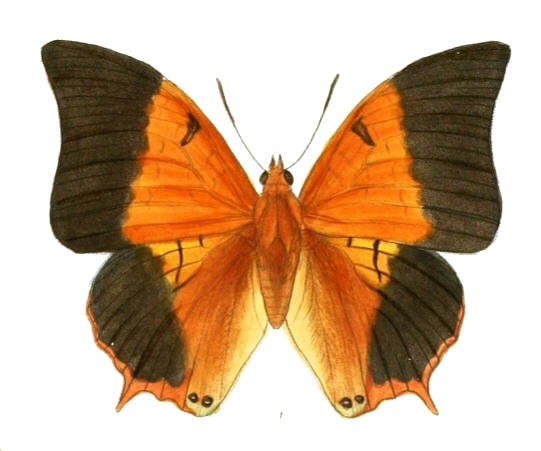
Dorsal view (male)

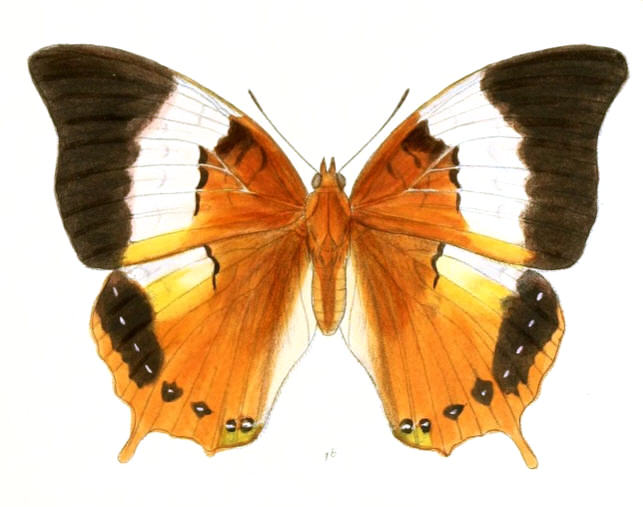
Dorsal view (female)

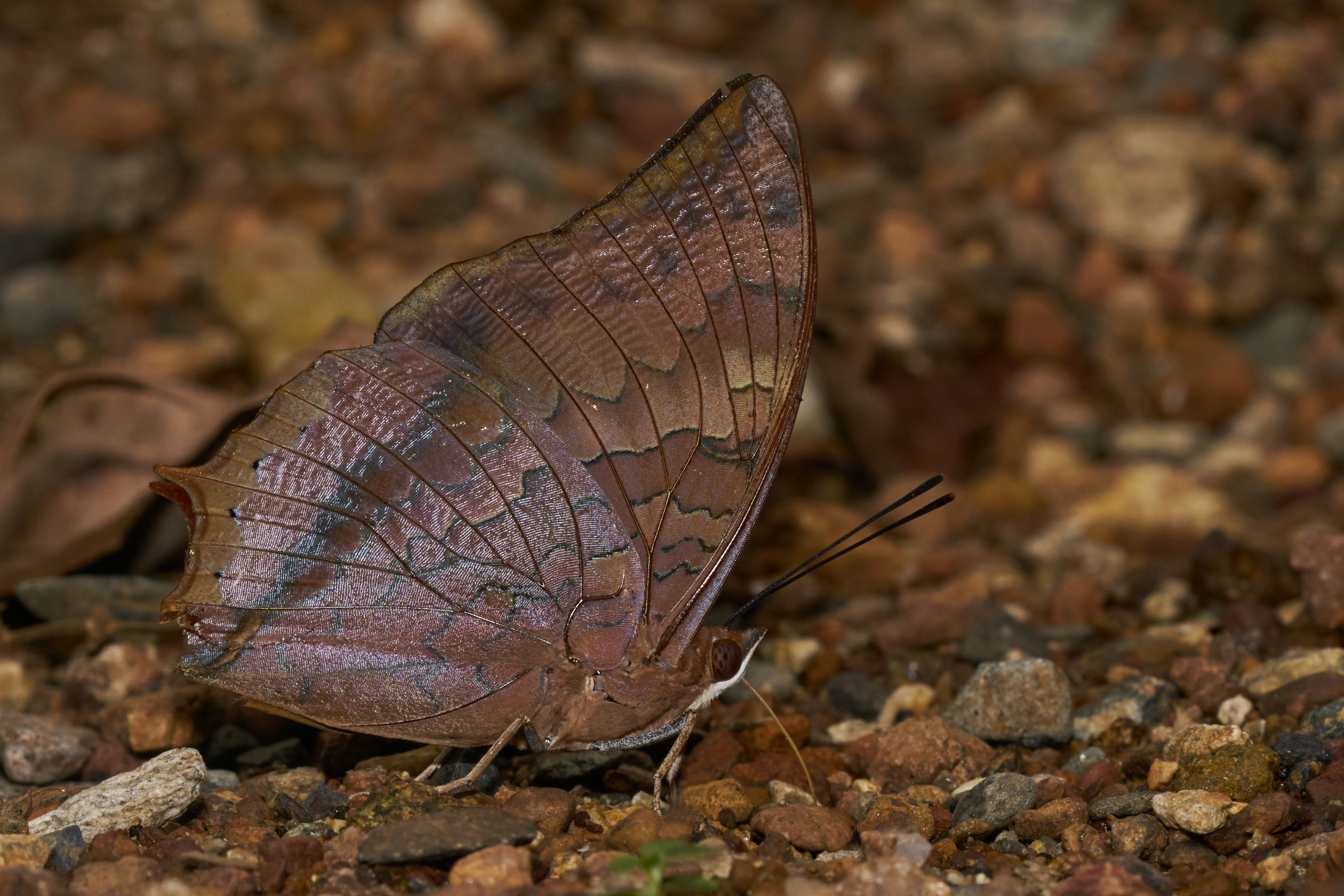
Ventral view (male)

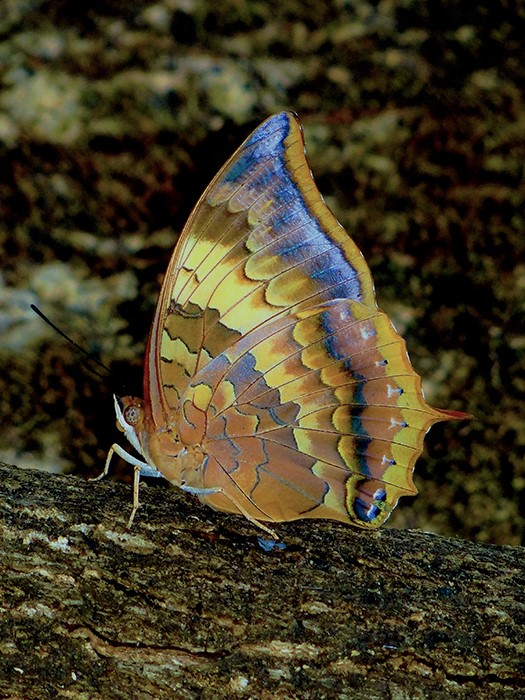
Ventral view (female)

===== Charaxes schreiber (blue nawab) =====
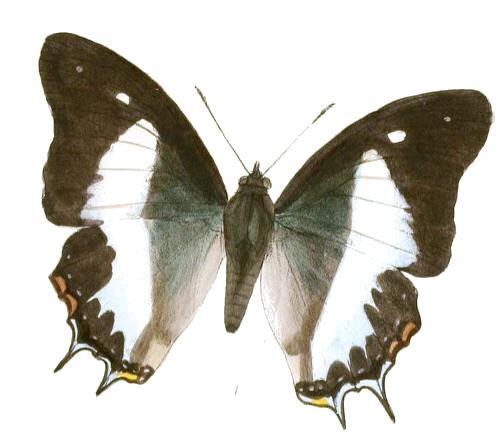
Dorsal view

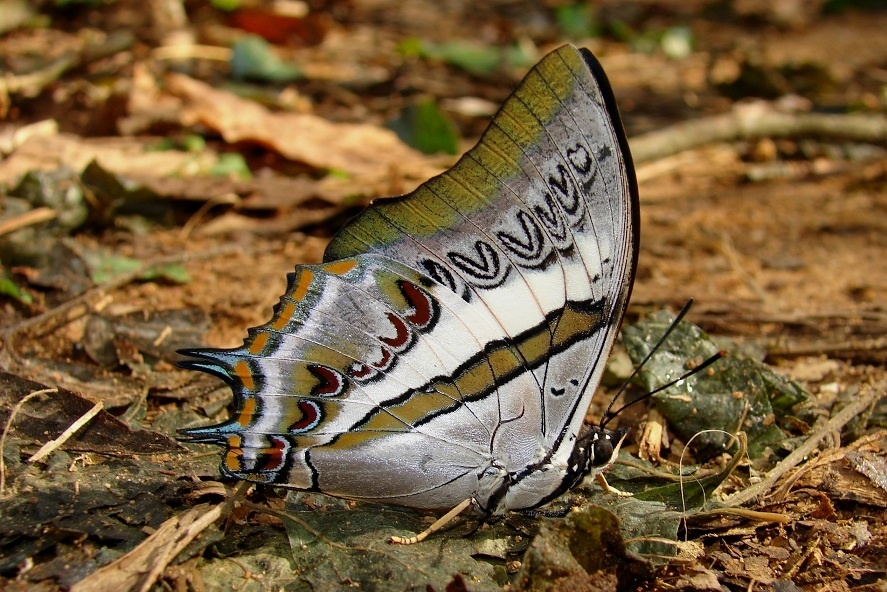
Ventral view

===== Charaxes solon (black rajah) =====
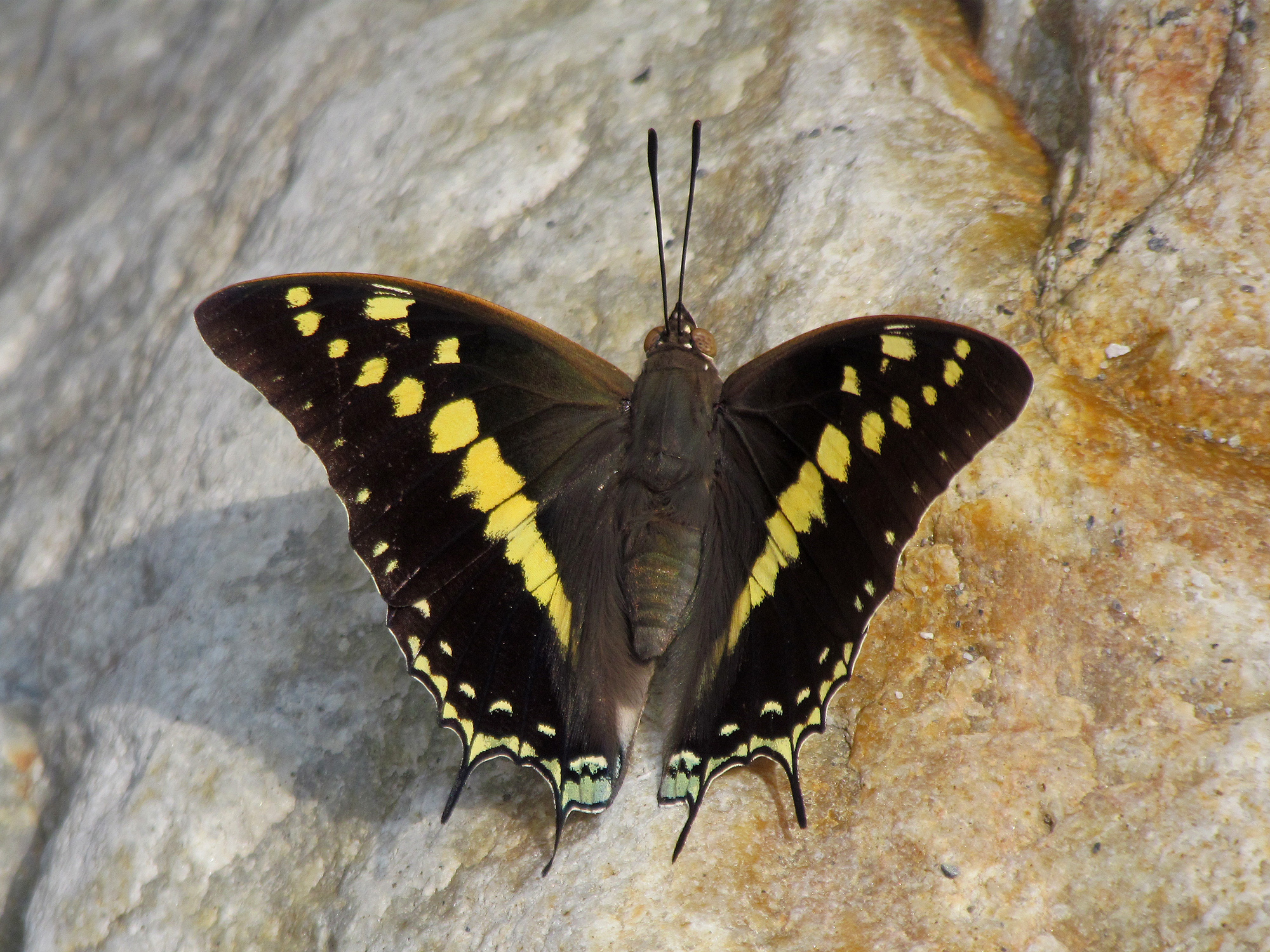
Dorsal view

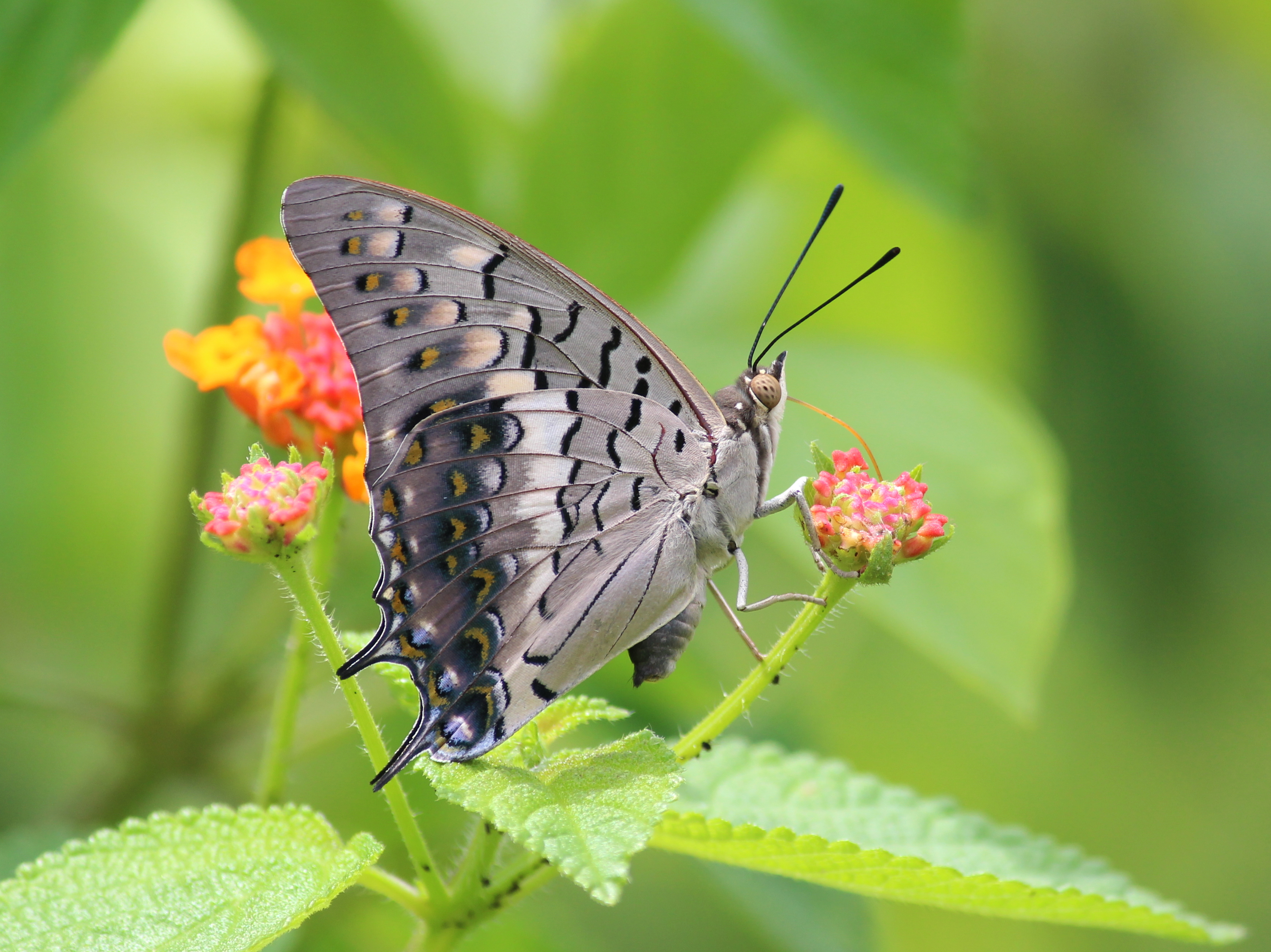
Ventral view

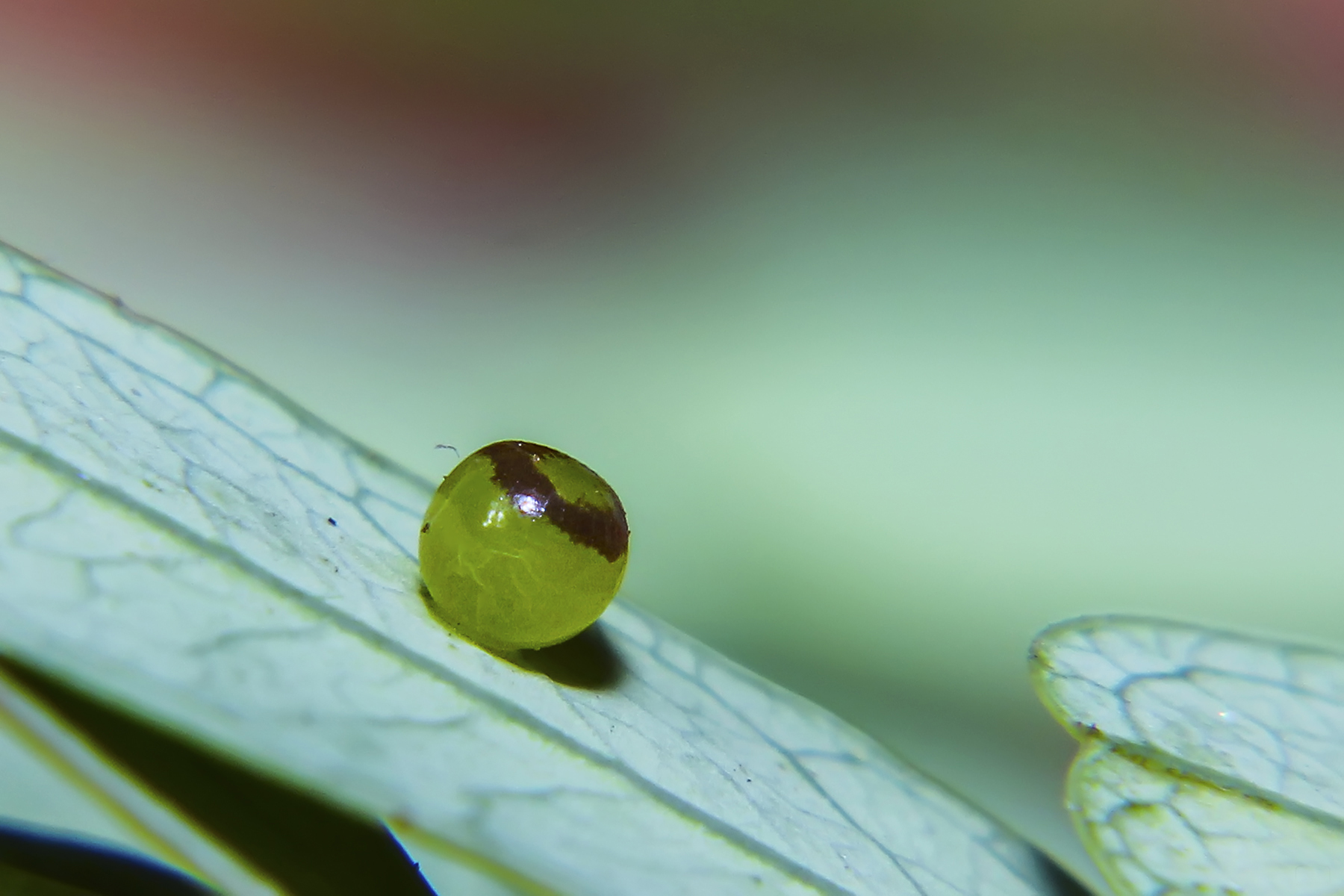
Egg

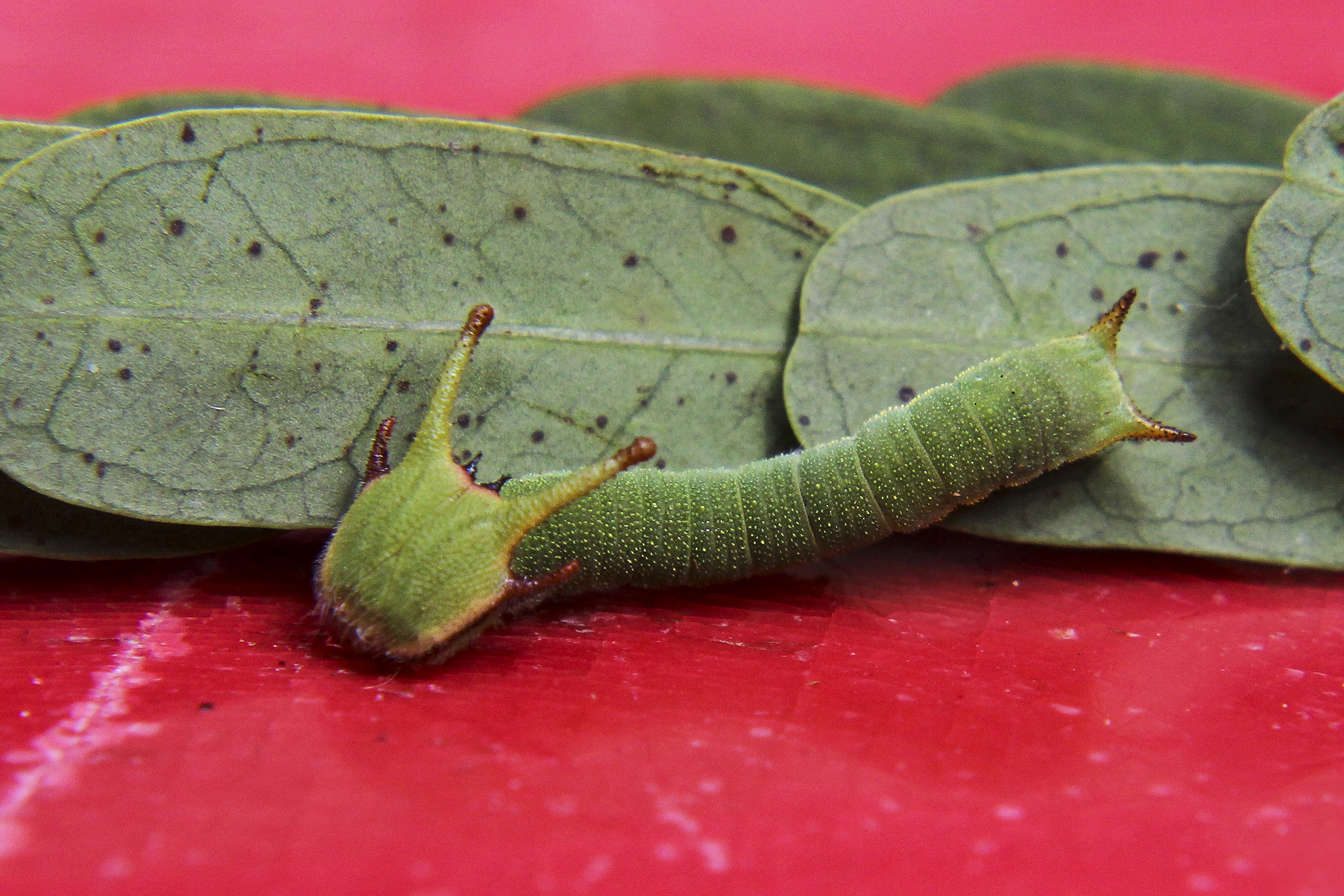
Larva

=== Subfamily: Cyrestinae ===
==== Genus: Cyrestis (maps) ====
===== Cyrestis thyodamas (common map) =====
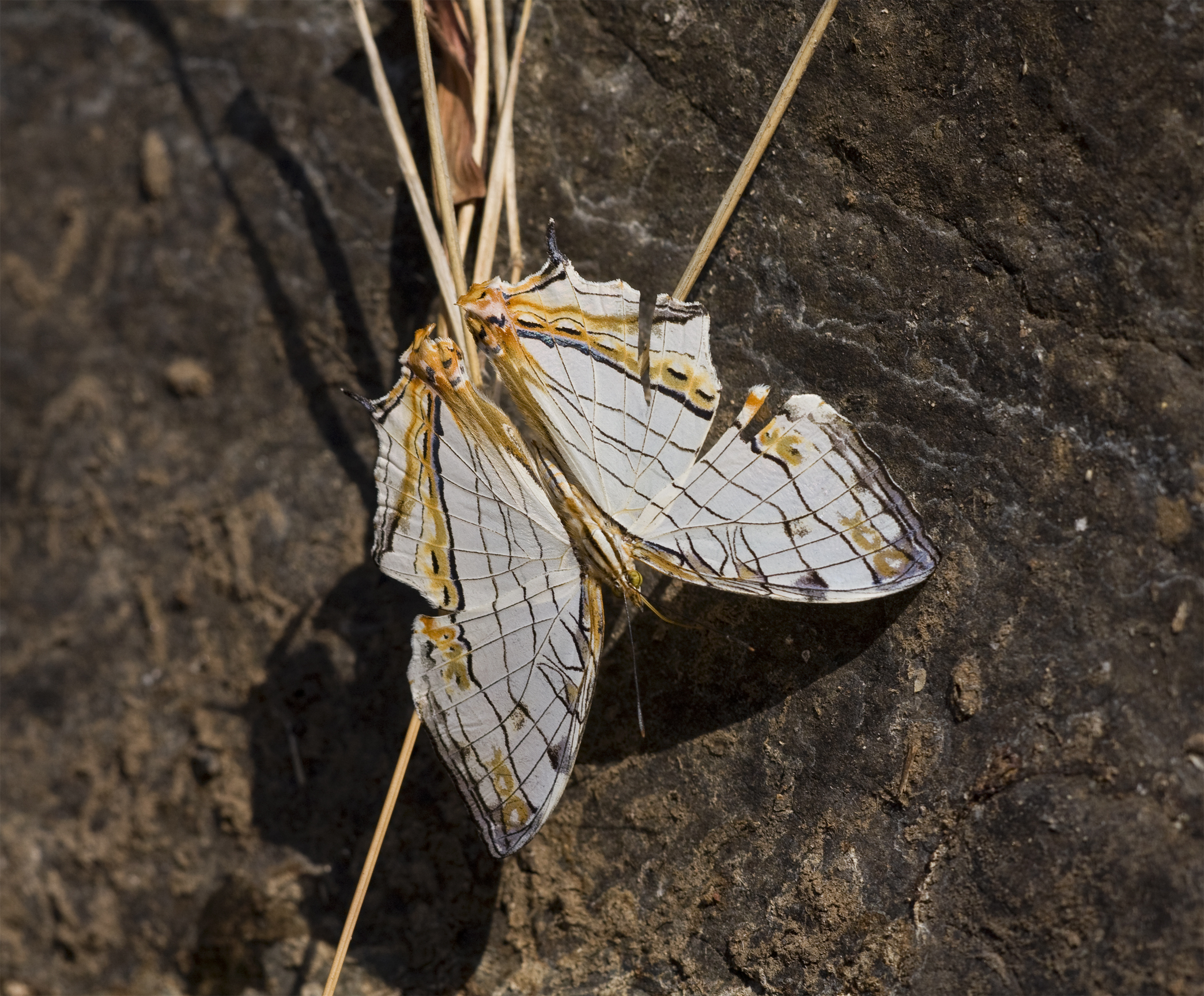
Dorsal view

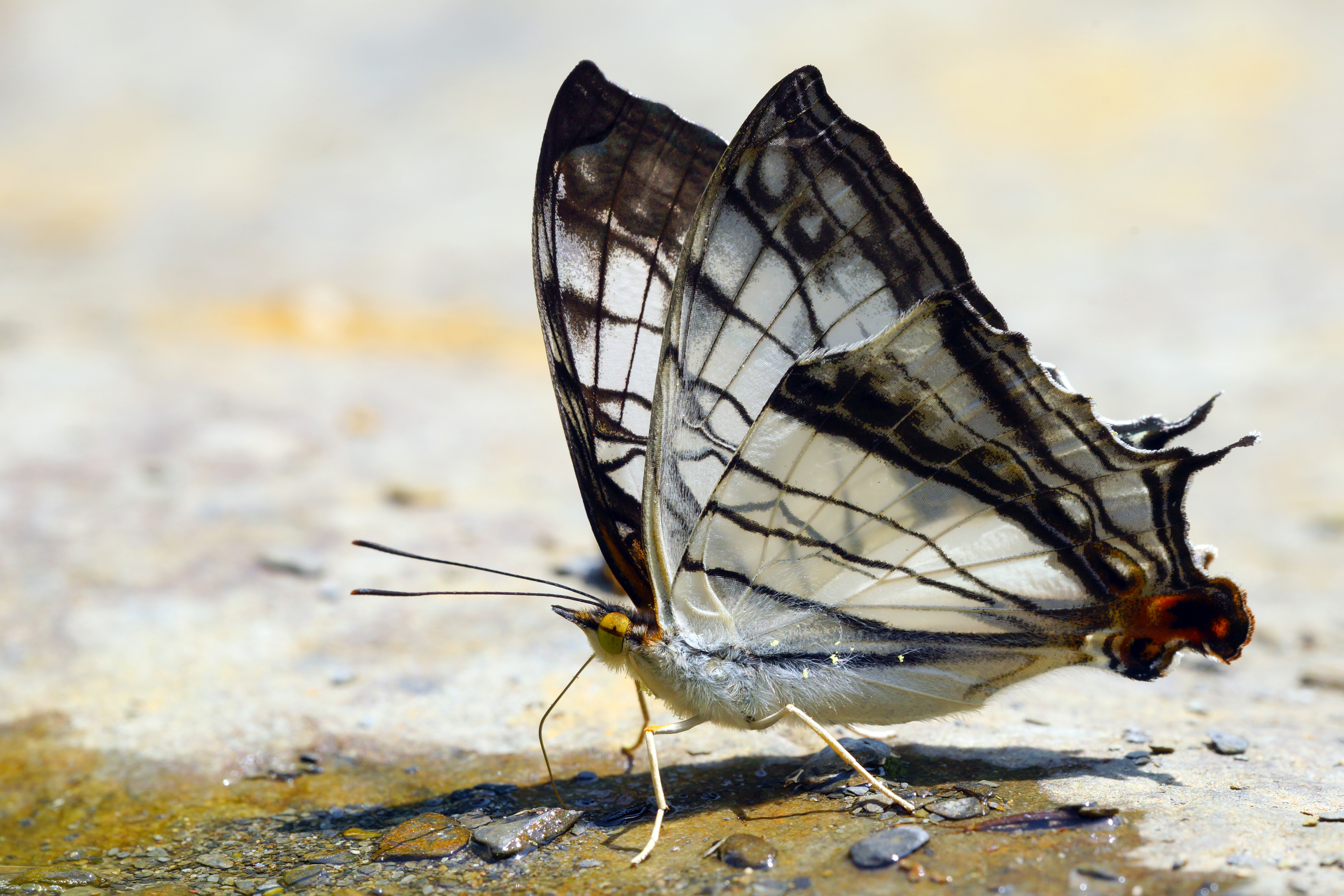
Ventral view

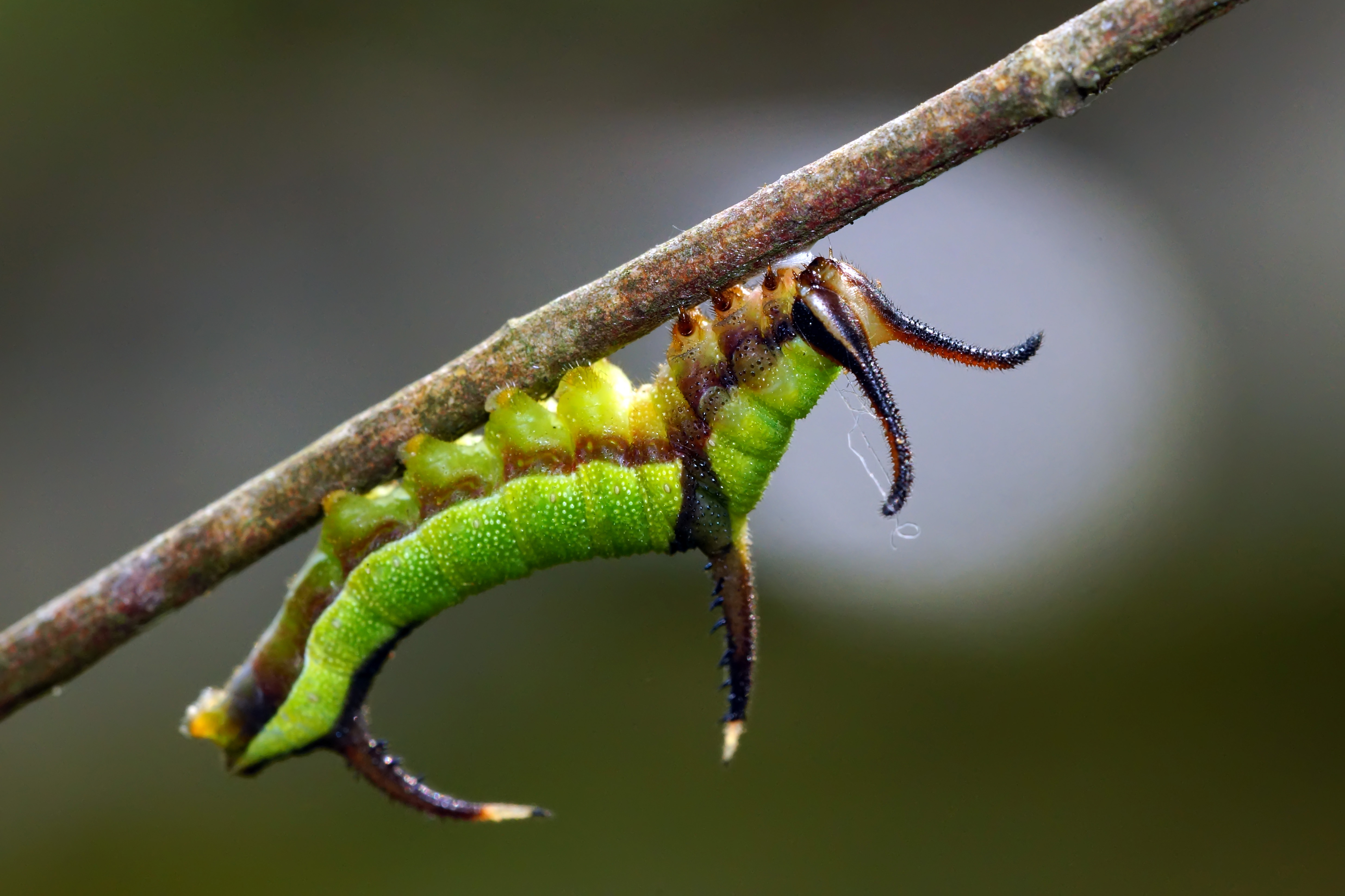
Larva

=== Subfamily: Danainae ===
==== Genus: Danaus (tigers) ====
===== Danaus chrysippus (plain tiger) =====
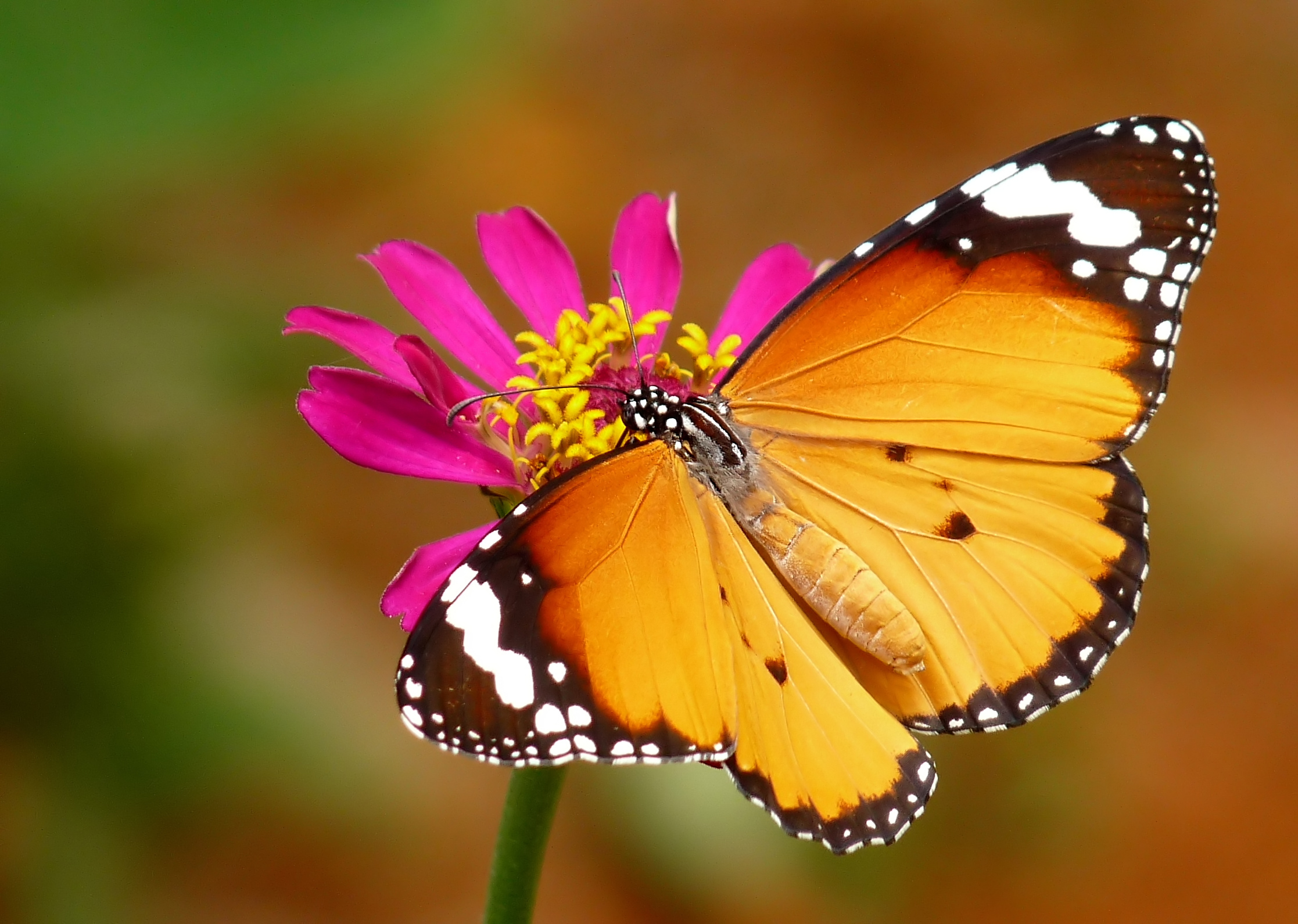
Dorsal view

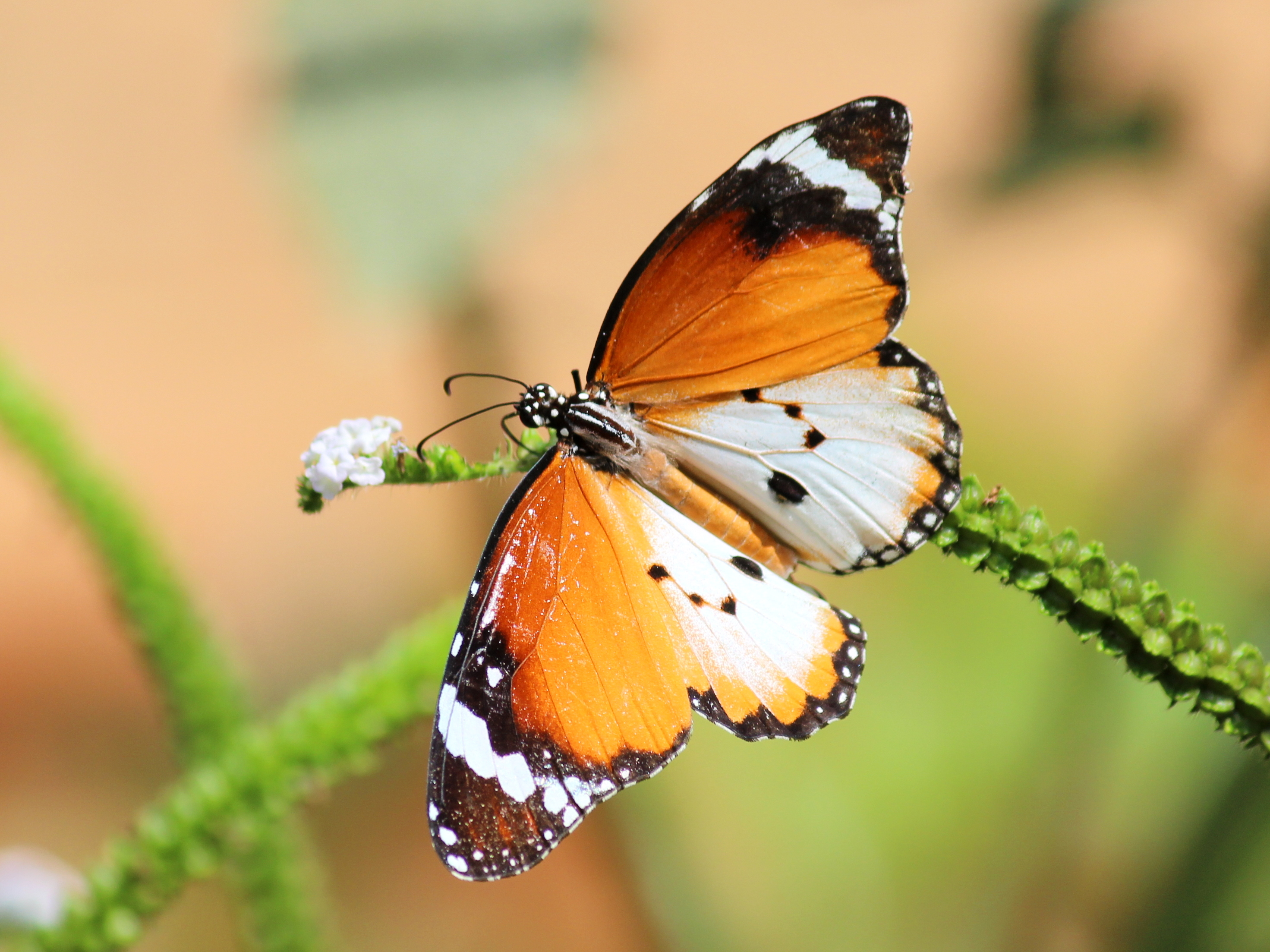
Dorsal view (form alcippoides)

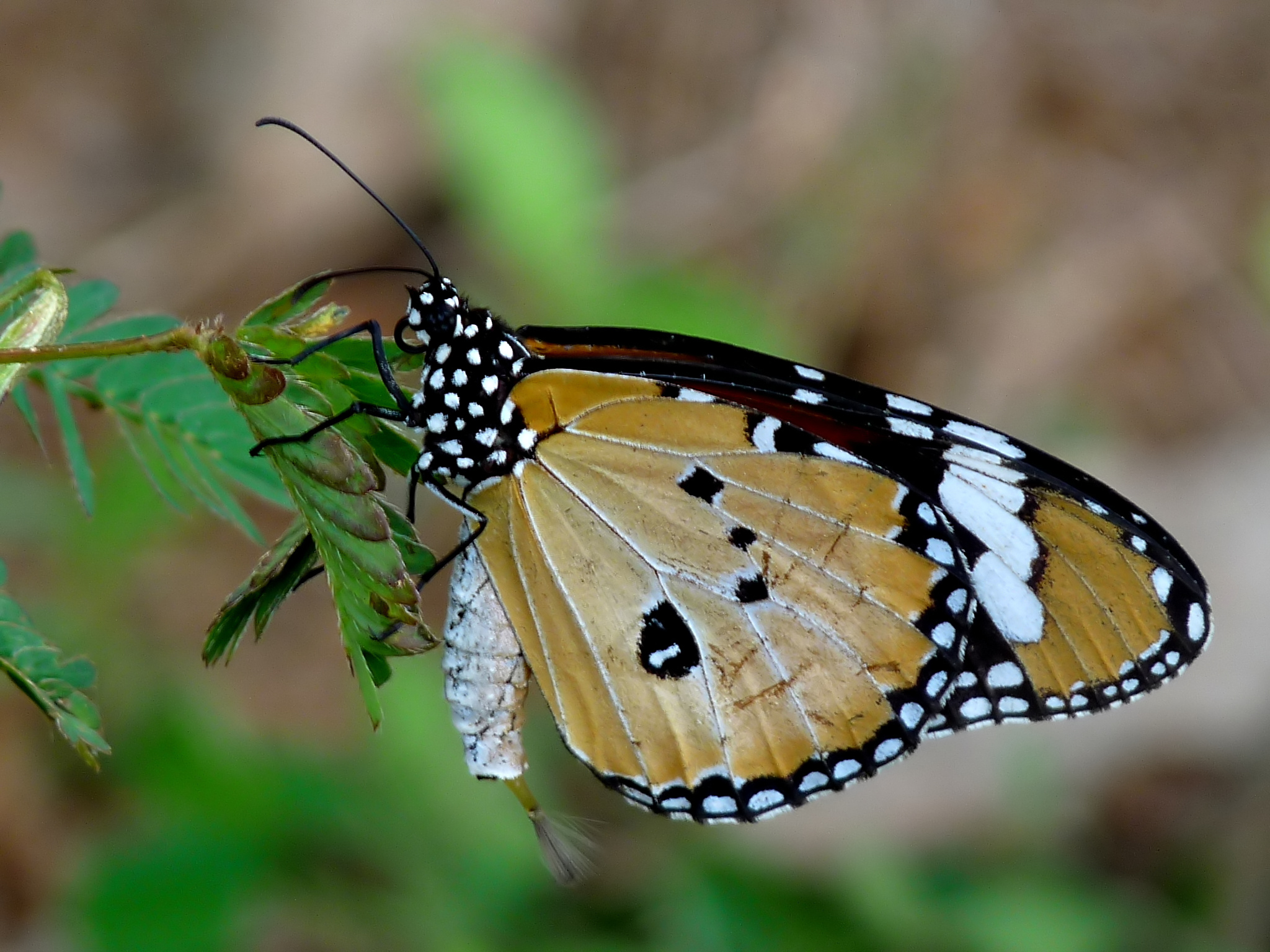
Ventral view

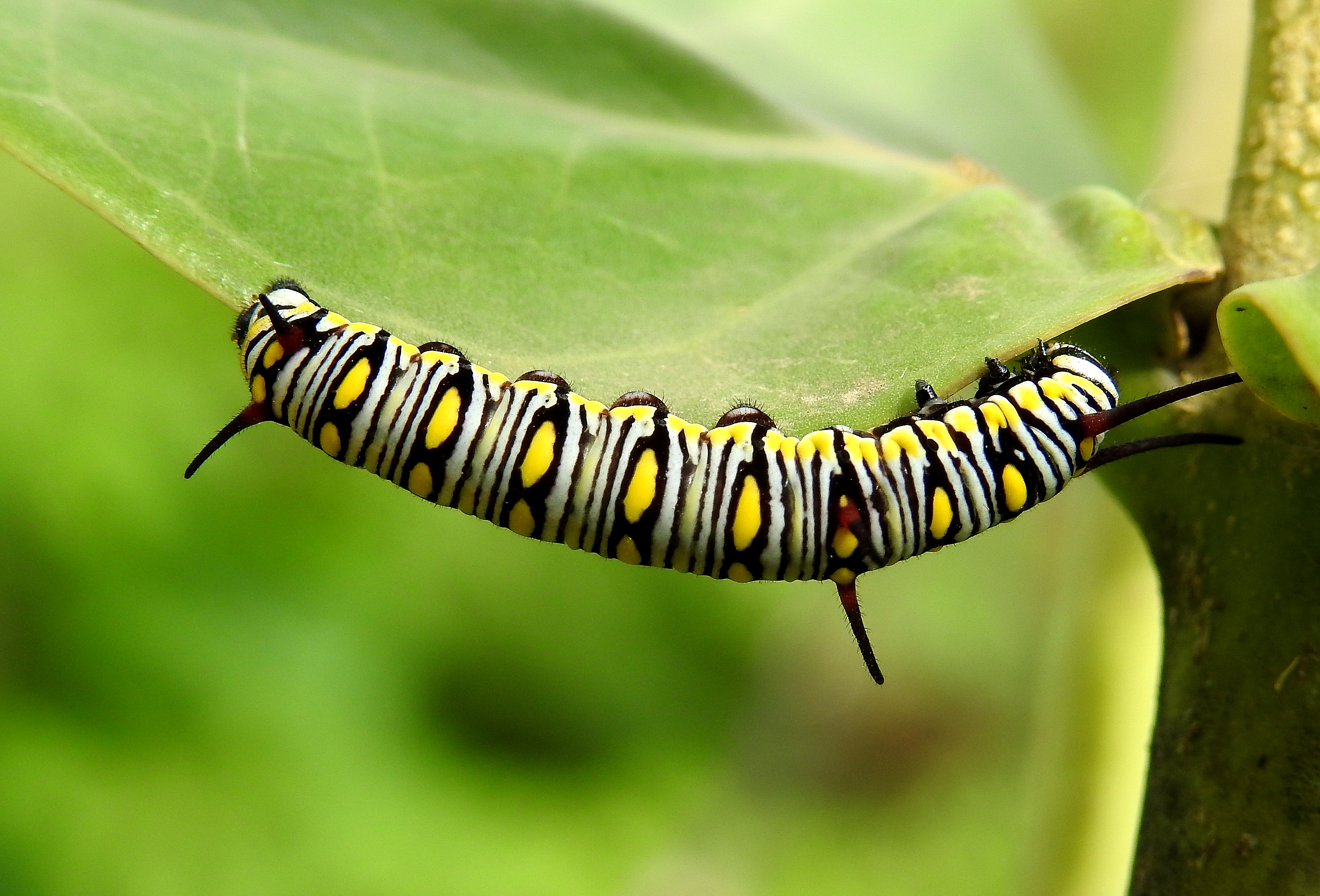
Larva

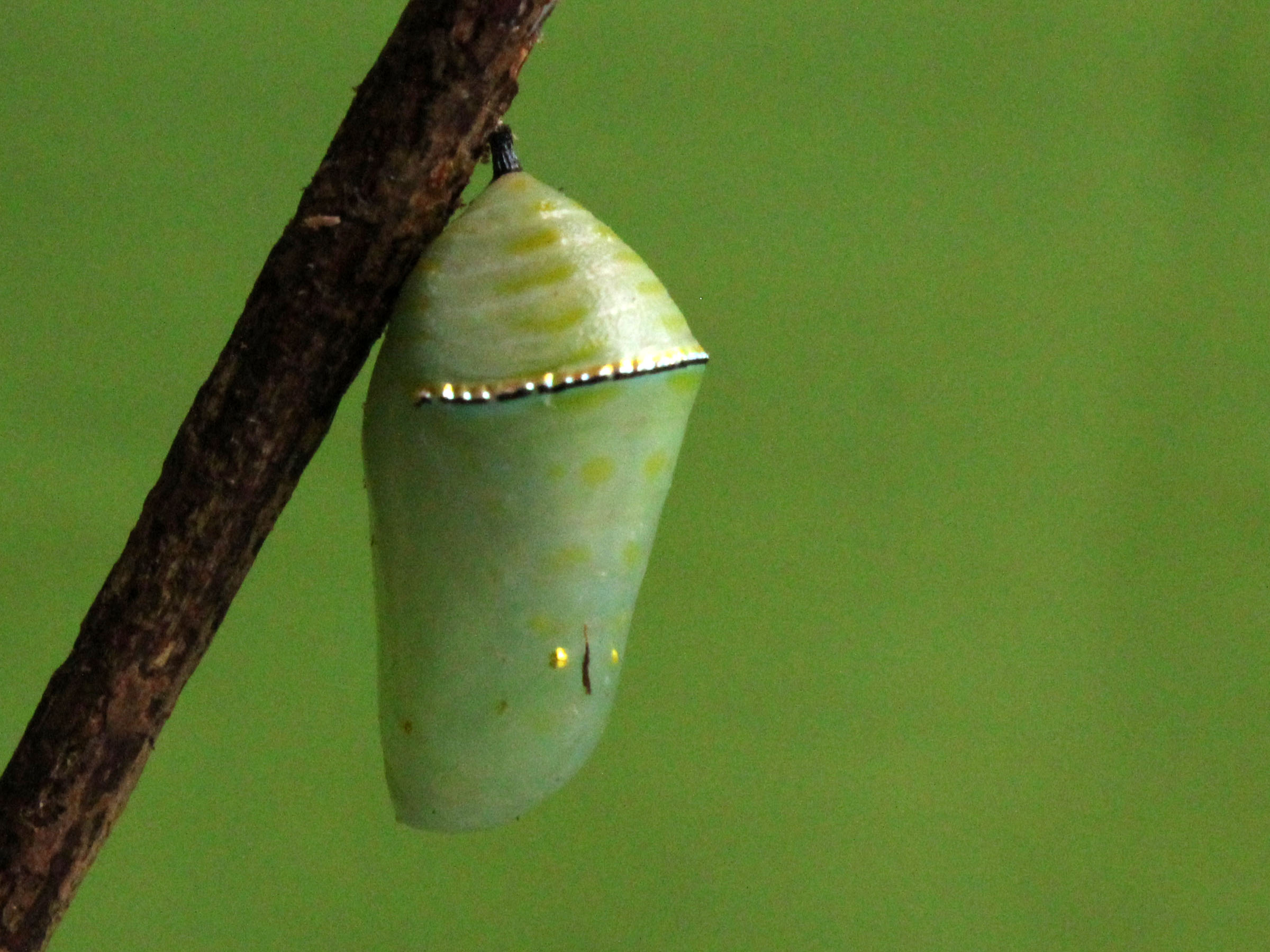
Pupa

===== Danaus genutia (common/striped tiger) =====
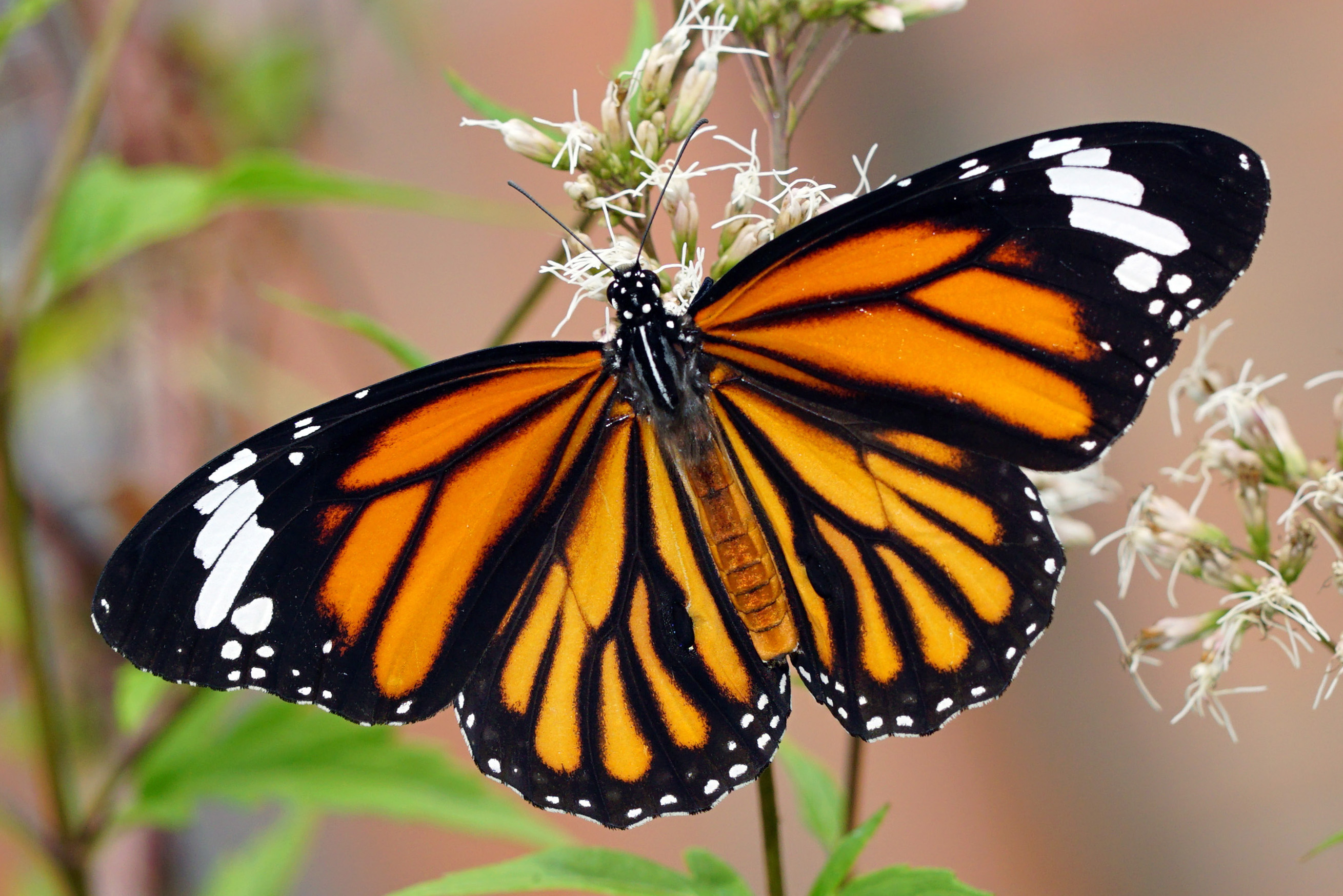
Dorsal view

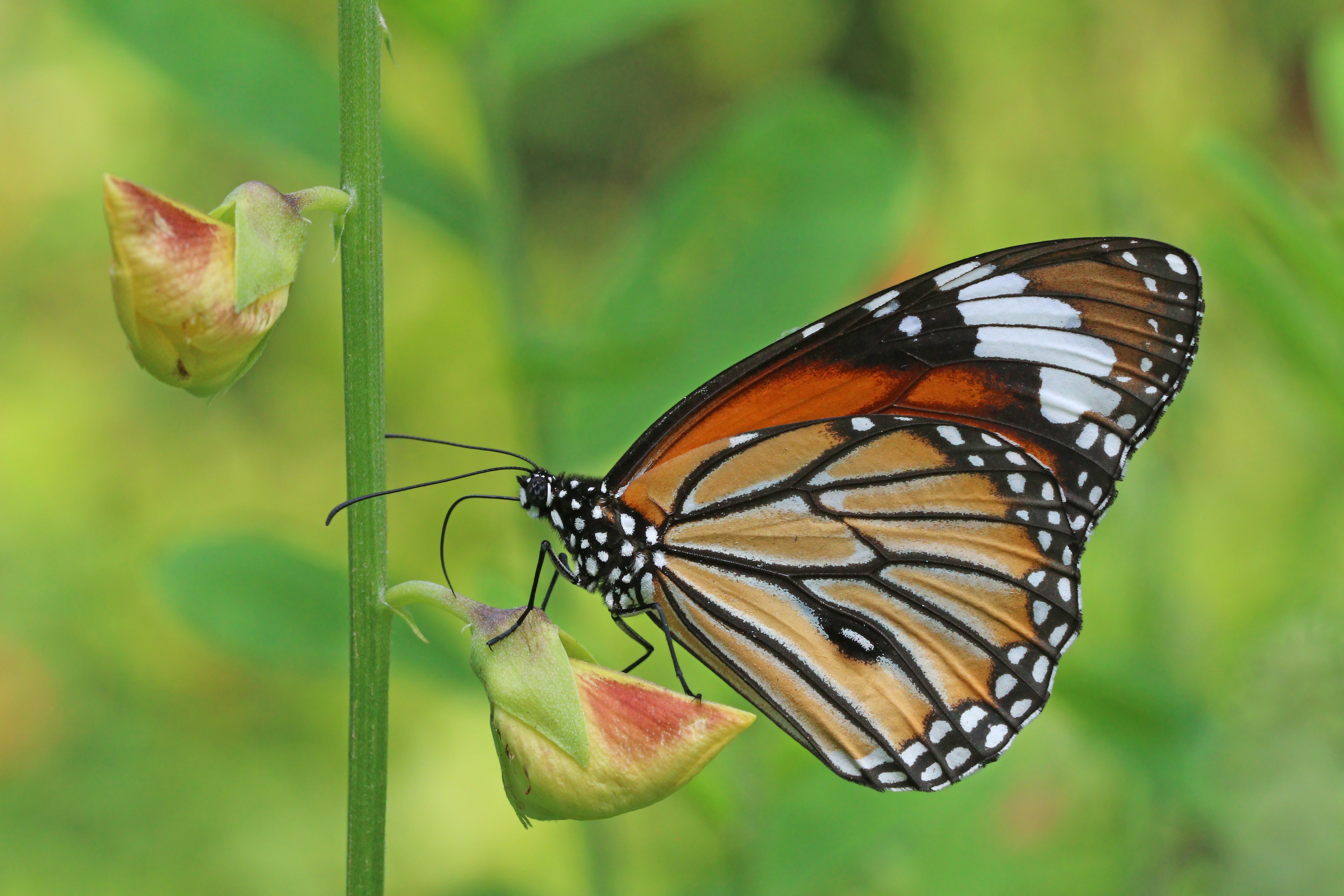
Ventral view (male)

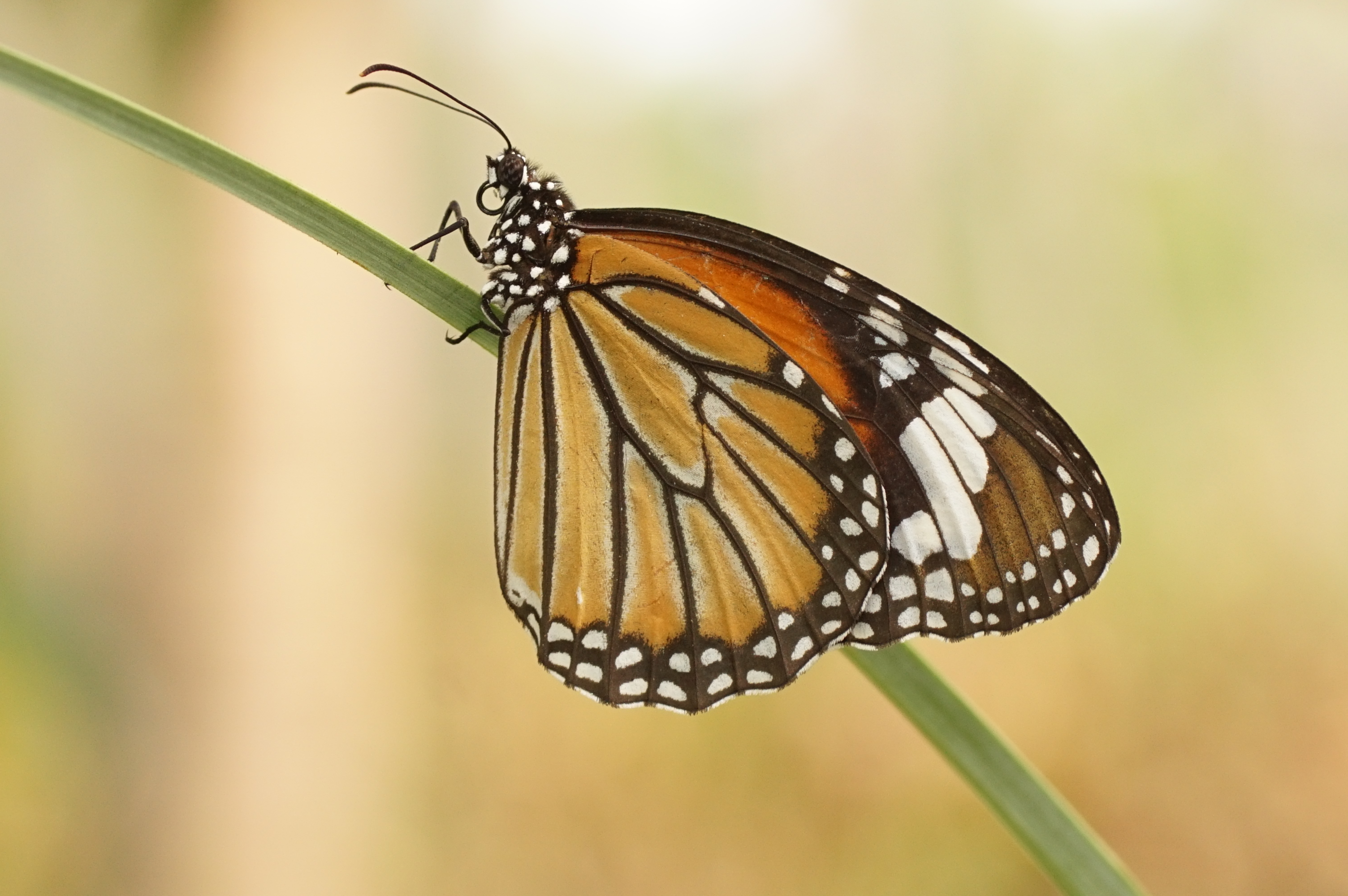
Ventral view (female)

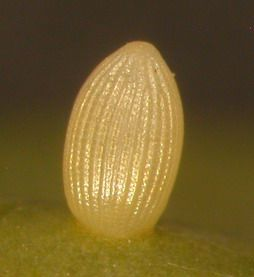
Egg

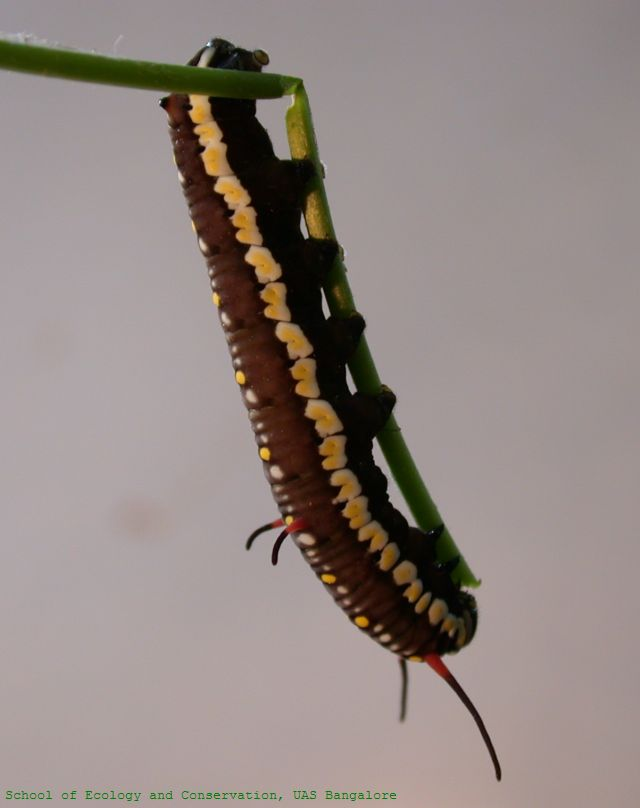
Larva

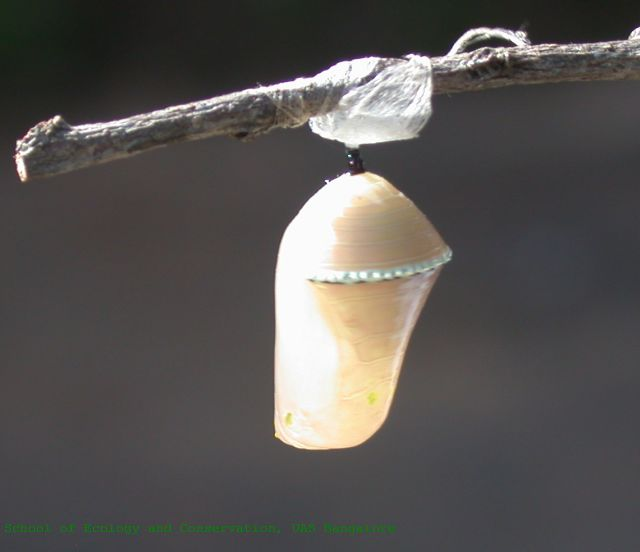
Pupa

==== Genus: Euploea (crows) ====
===== Euploea core (common crow) =====
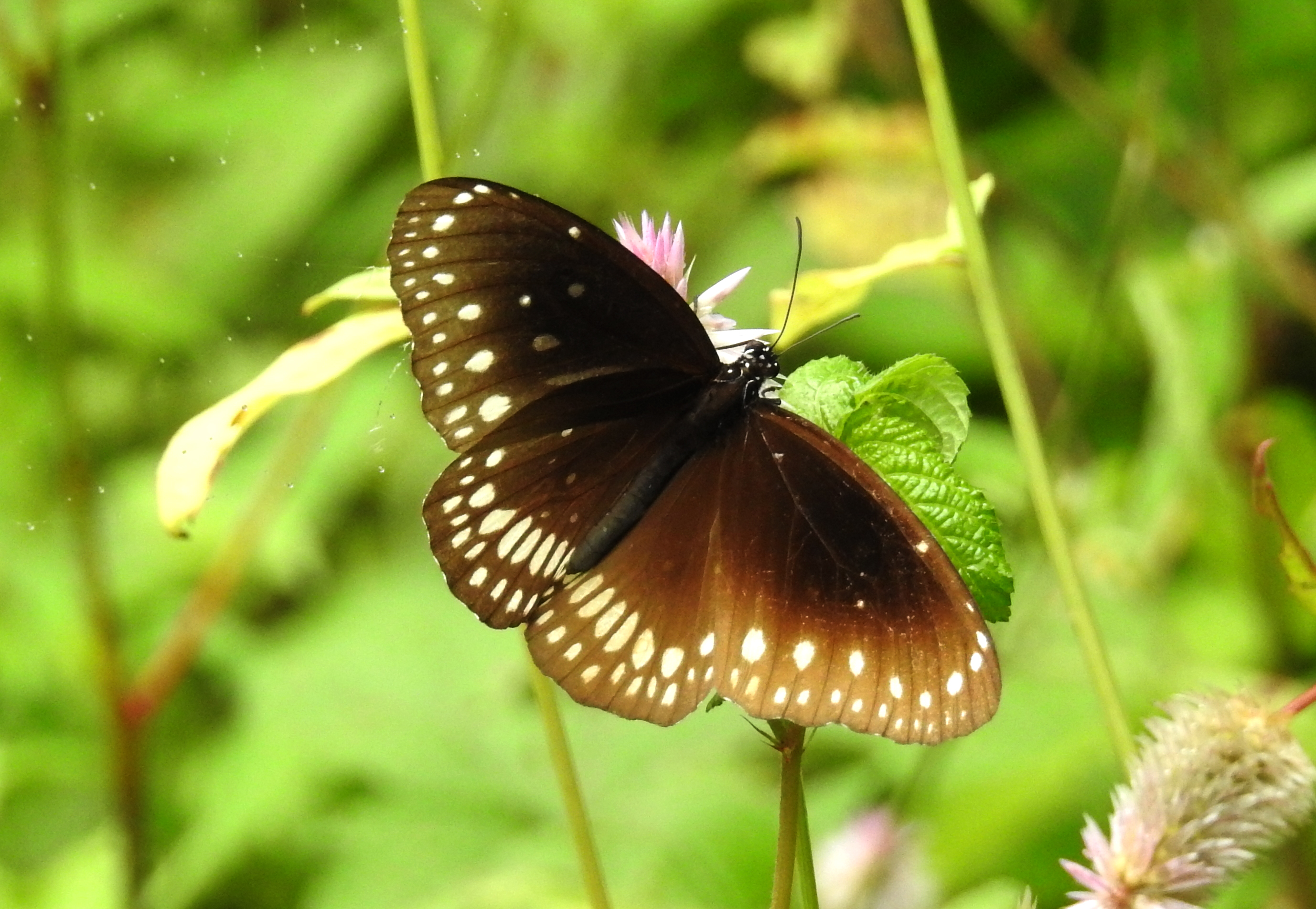
Dorsal view

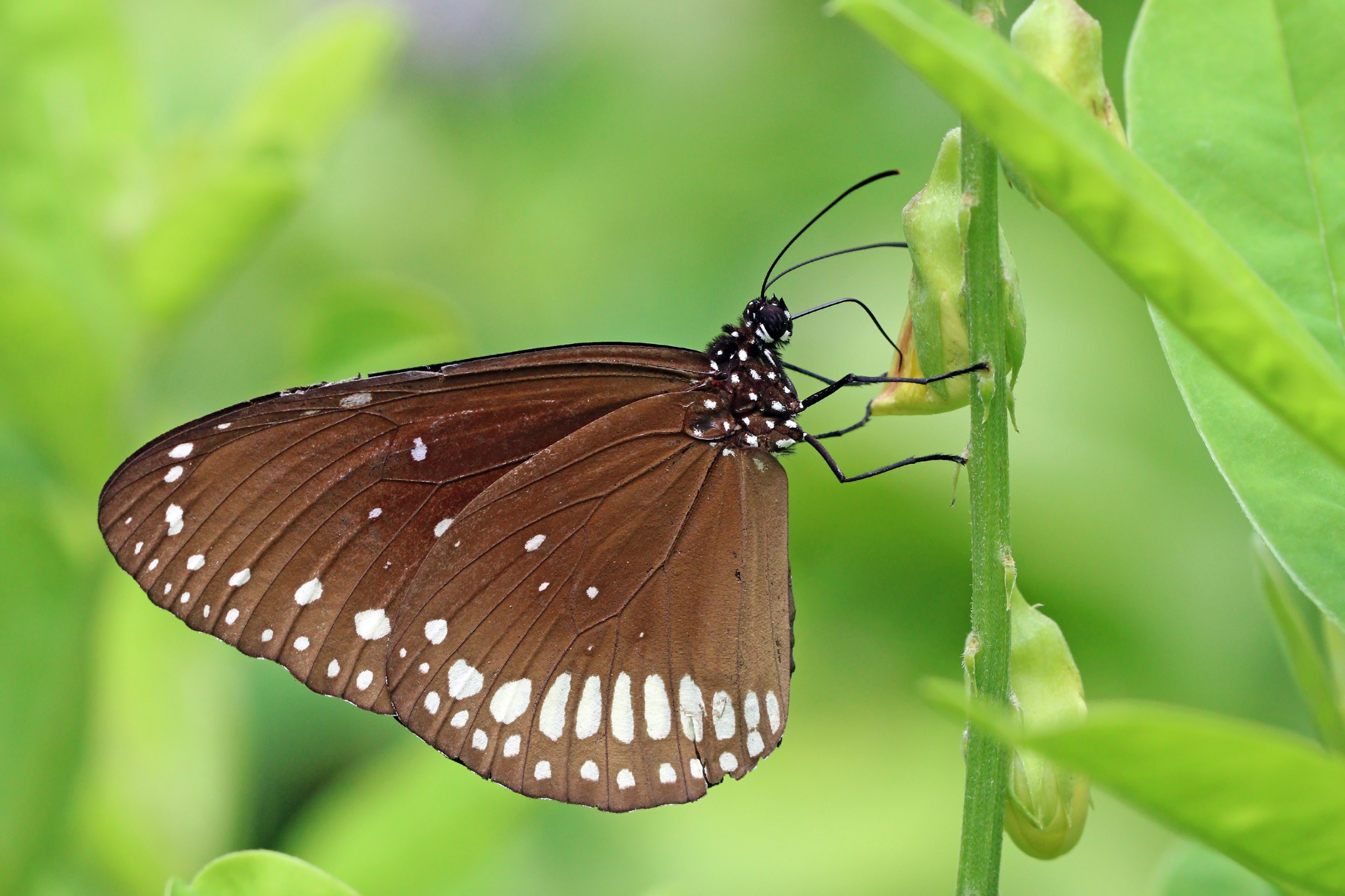
Ventral view

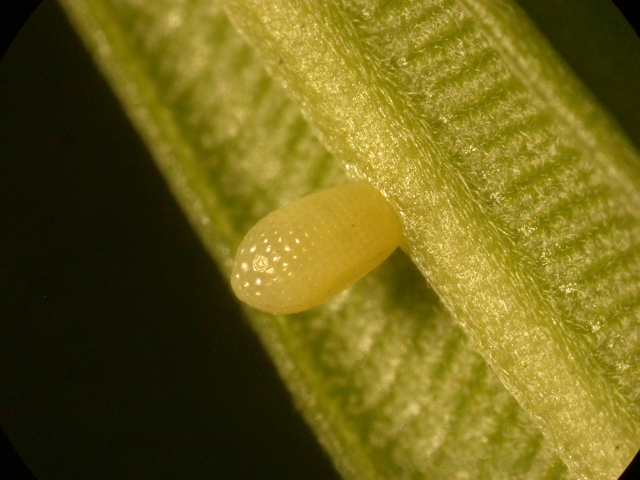
Egg

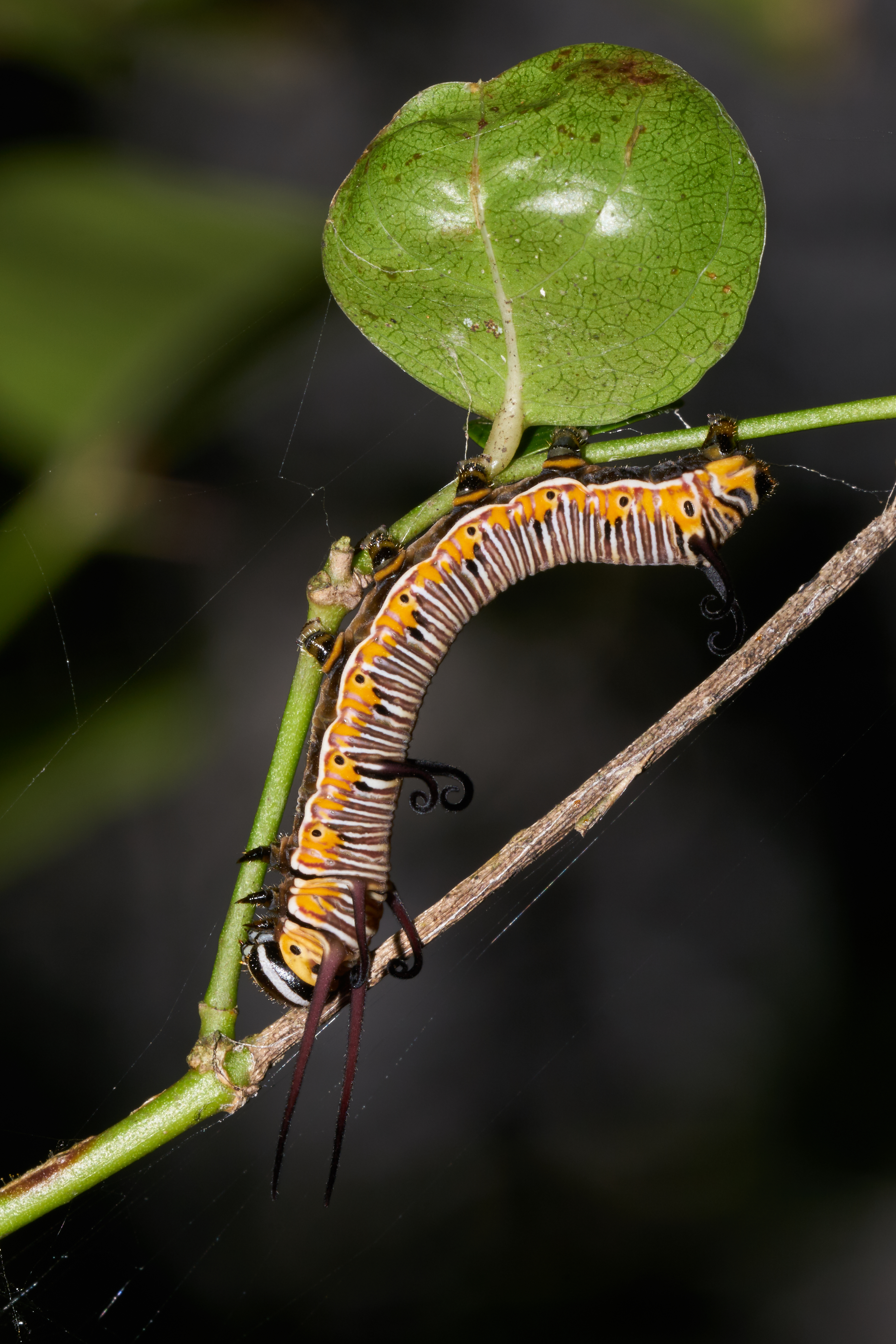
Larva

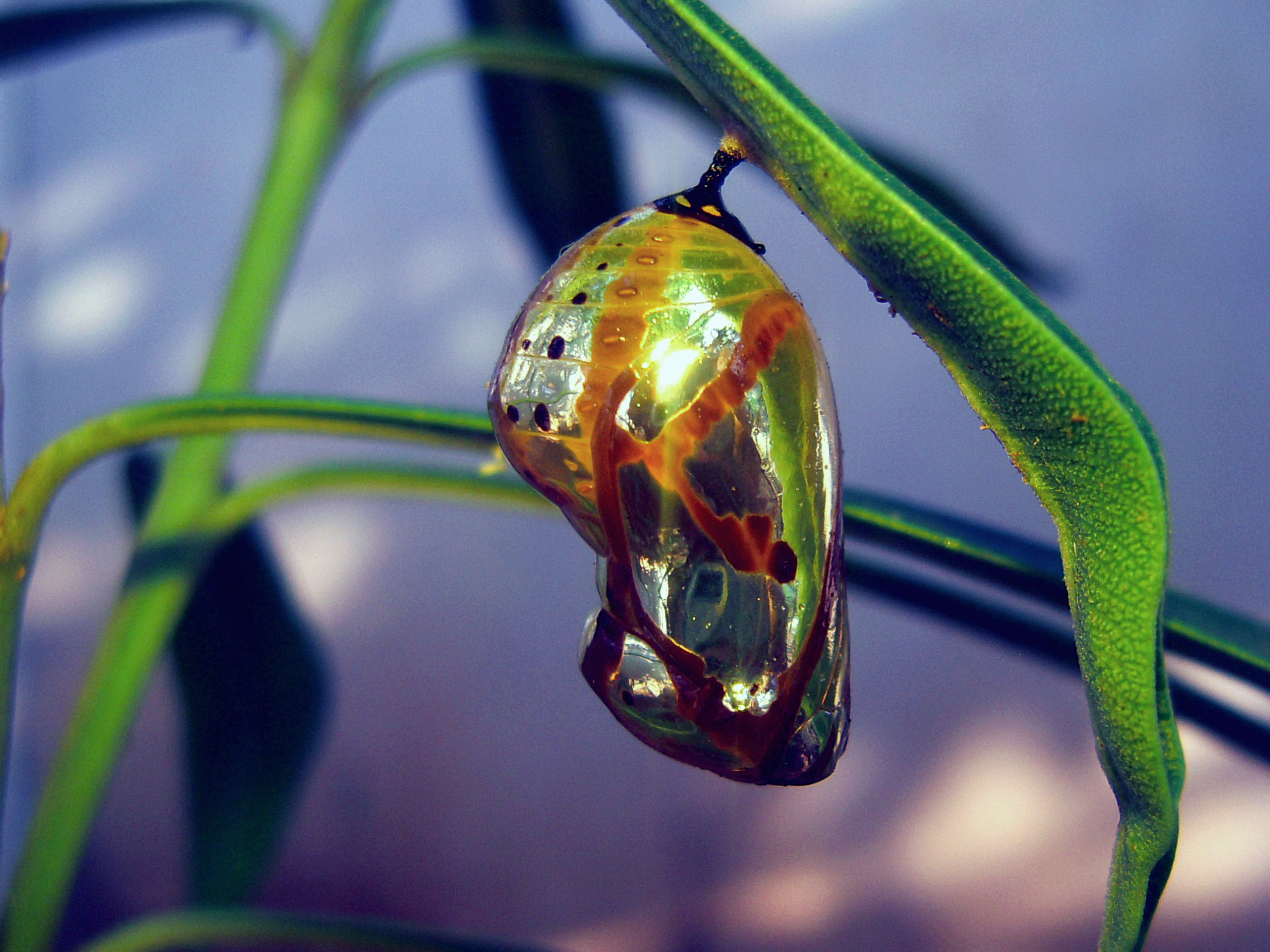
Pupa

===== Euploea klugii (king crow) =====
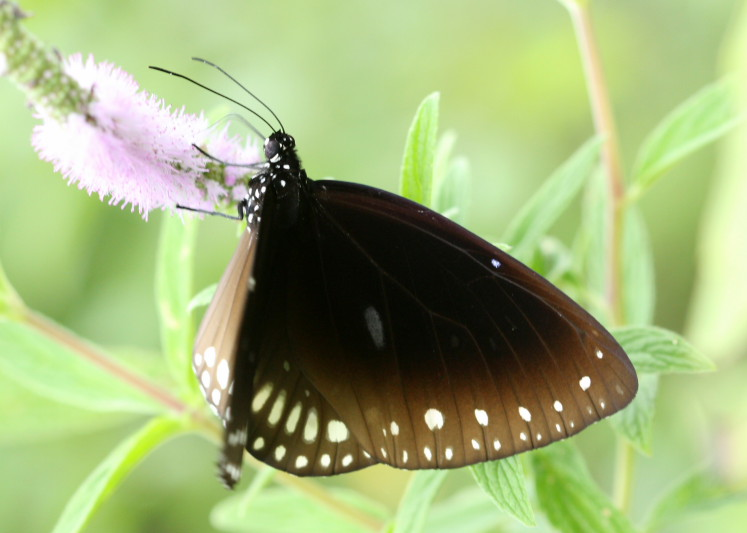
Dorsal view

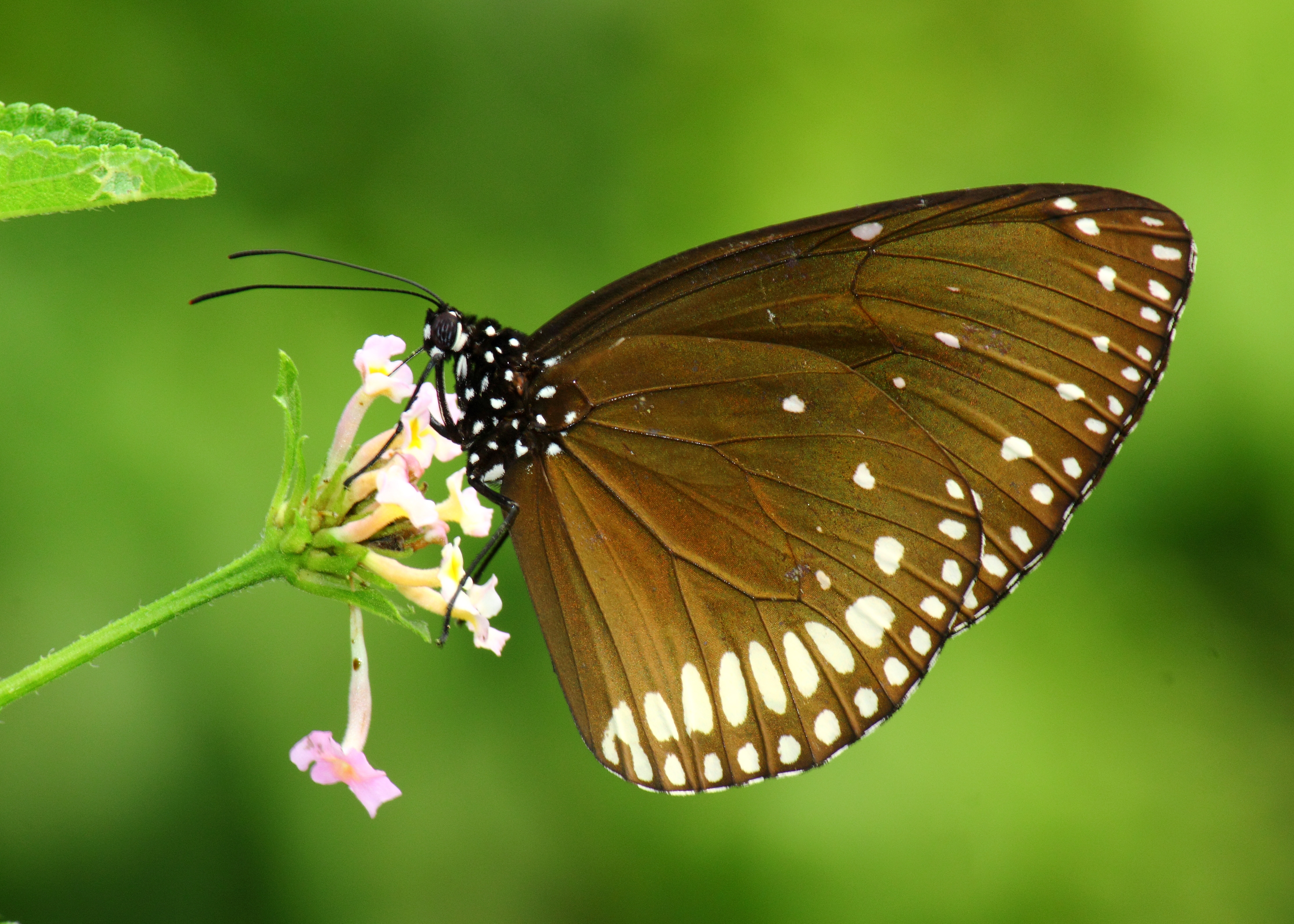
Ventral view

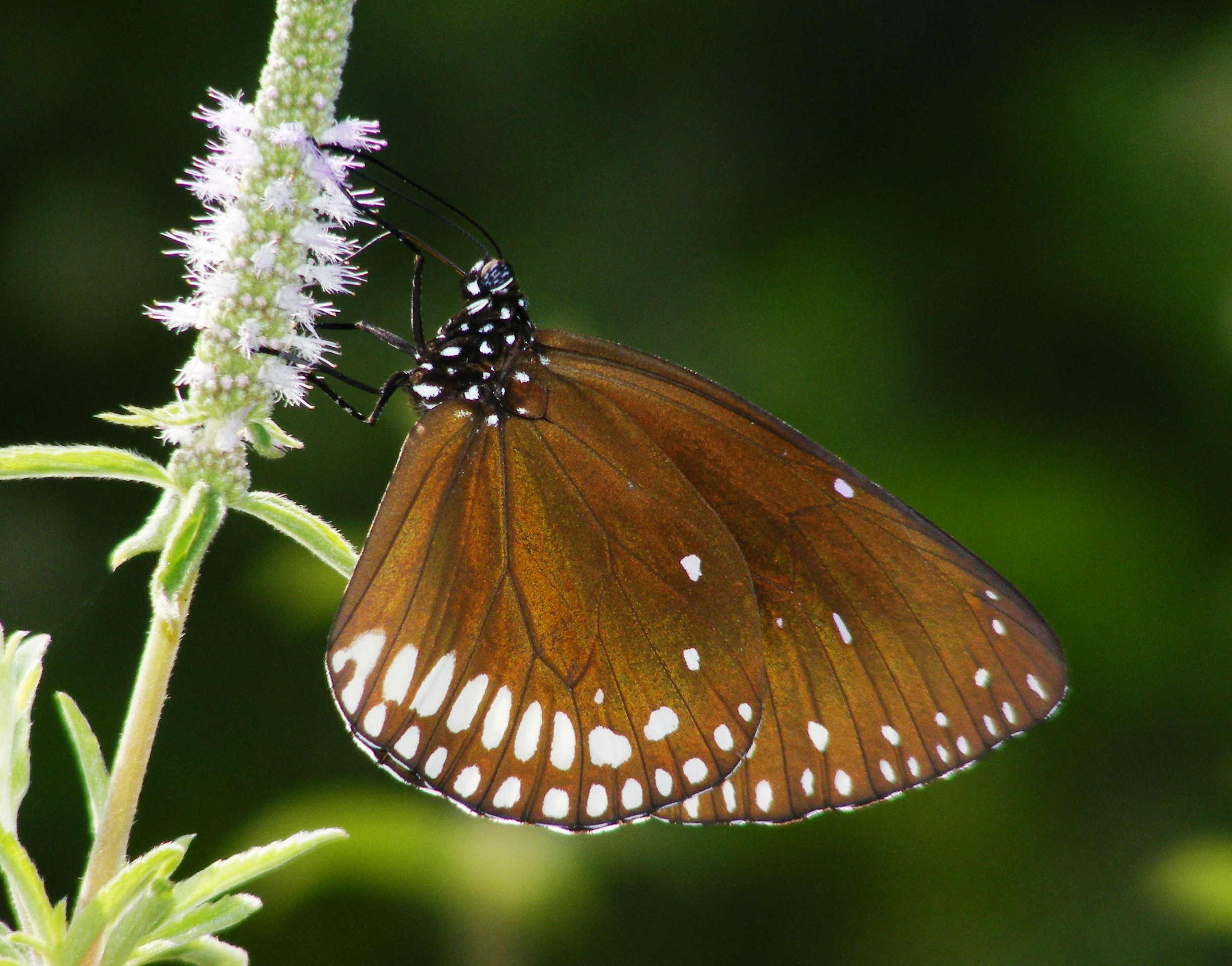
Ventral view

===== Euploea sylvester (double-branded crow) =====
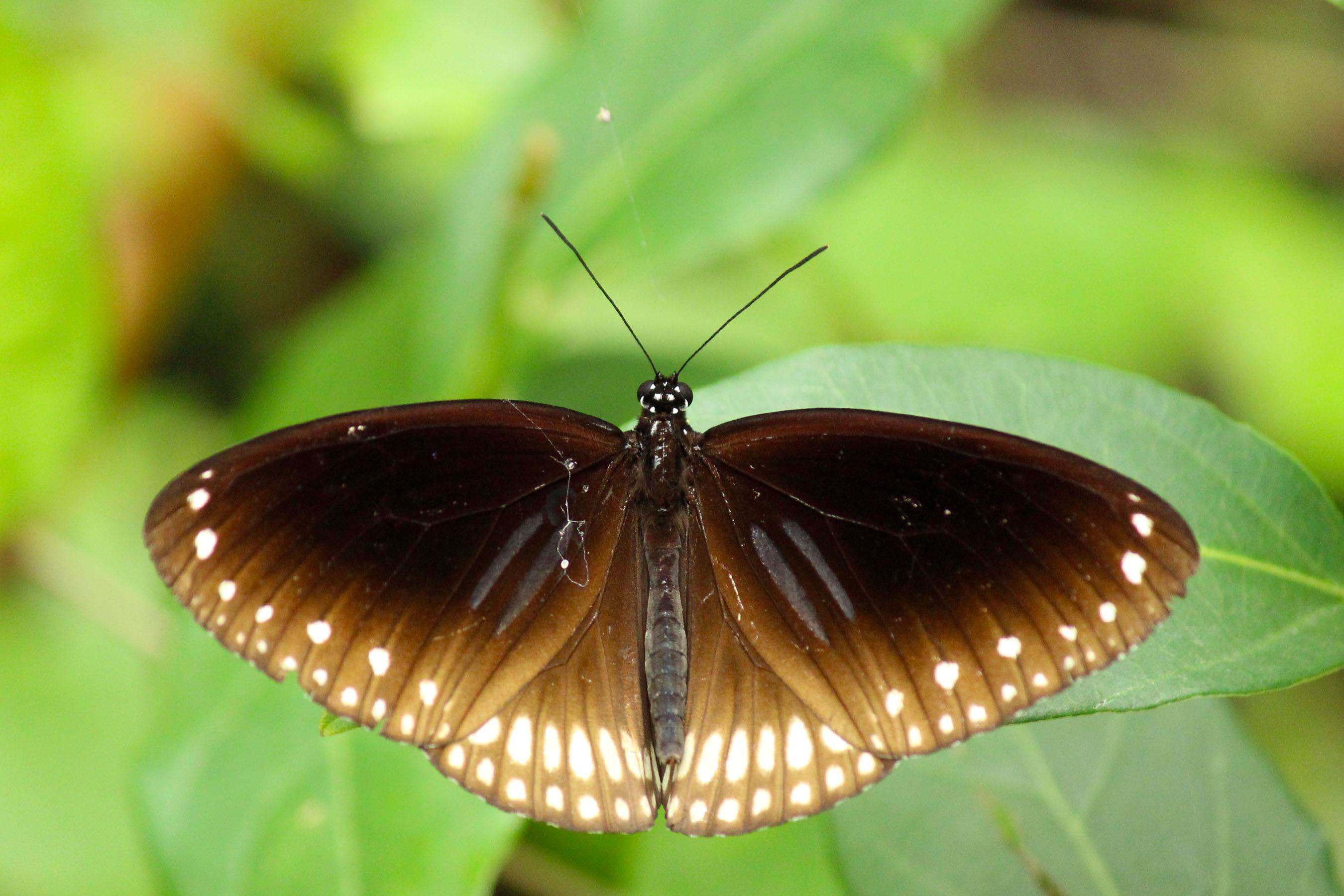
Dorsal view

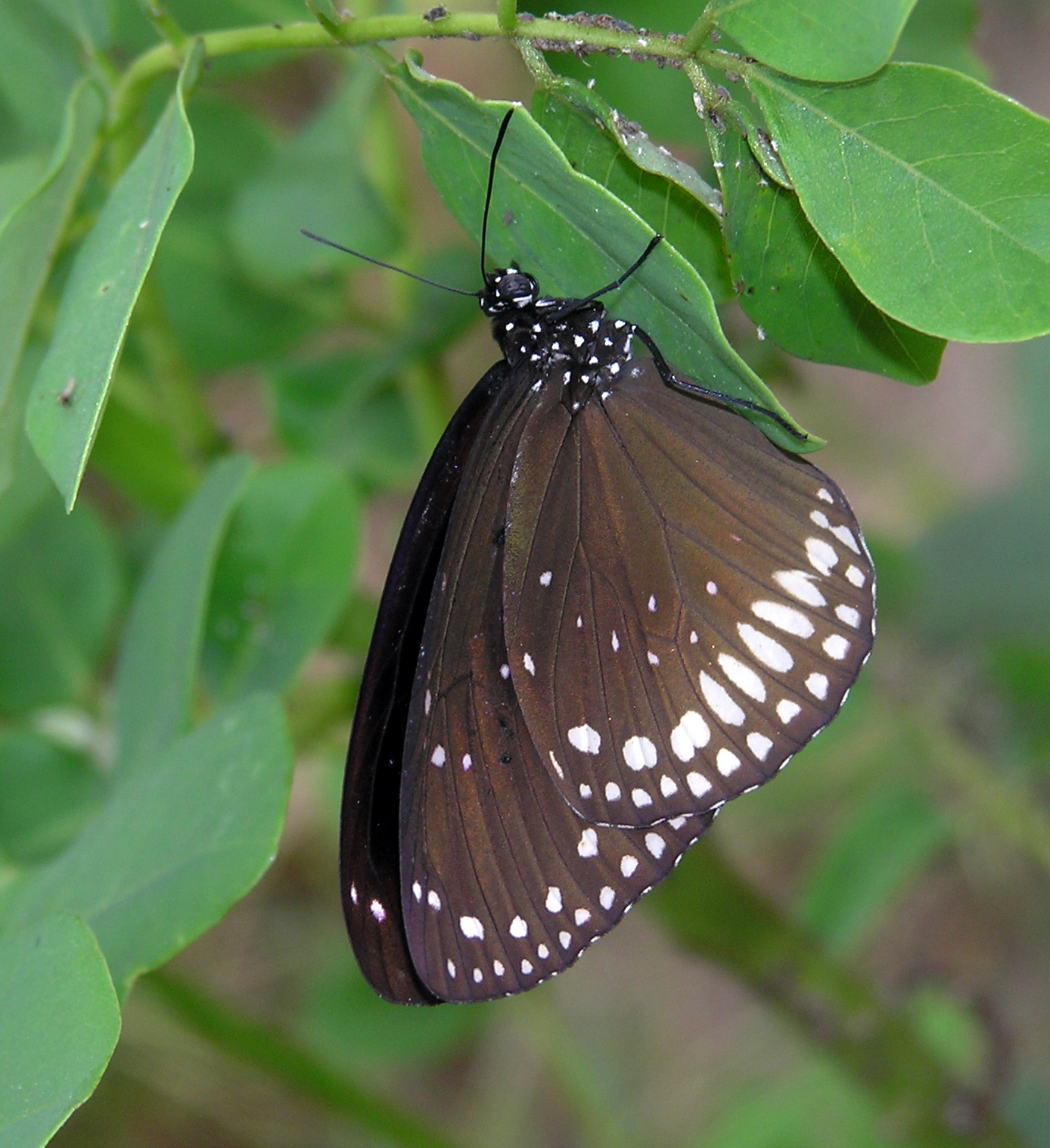
Ventral view

==== Genus: Idea (tree nymphs) ====
===== Idea malabarica (Malabar tree nymph) =====
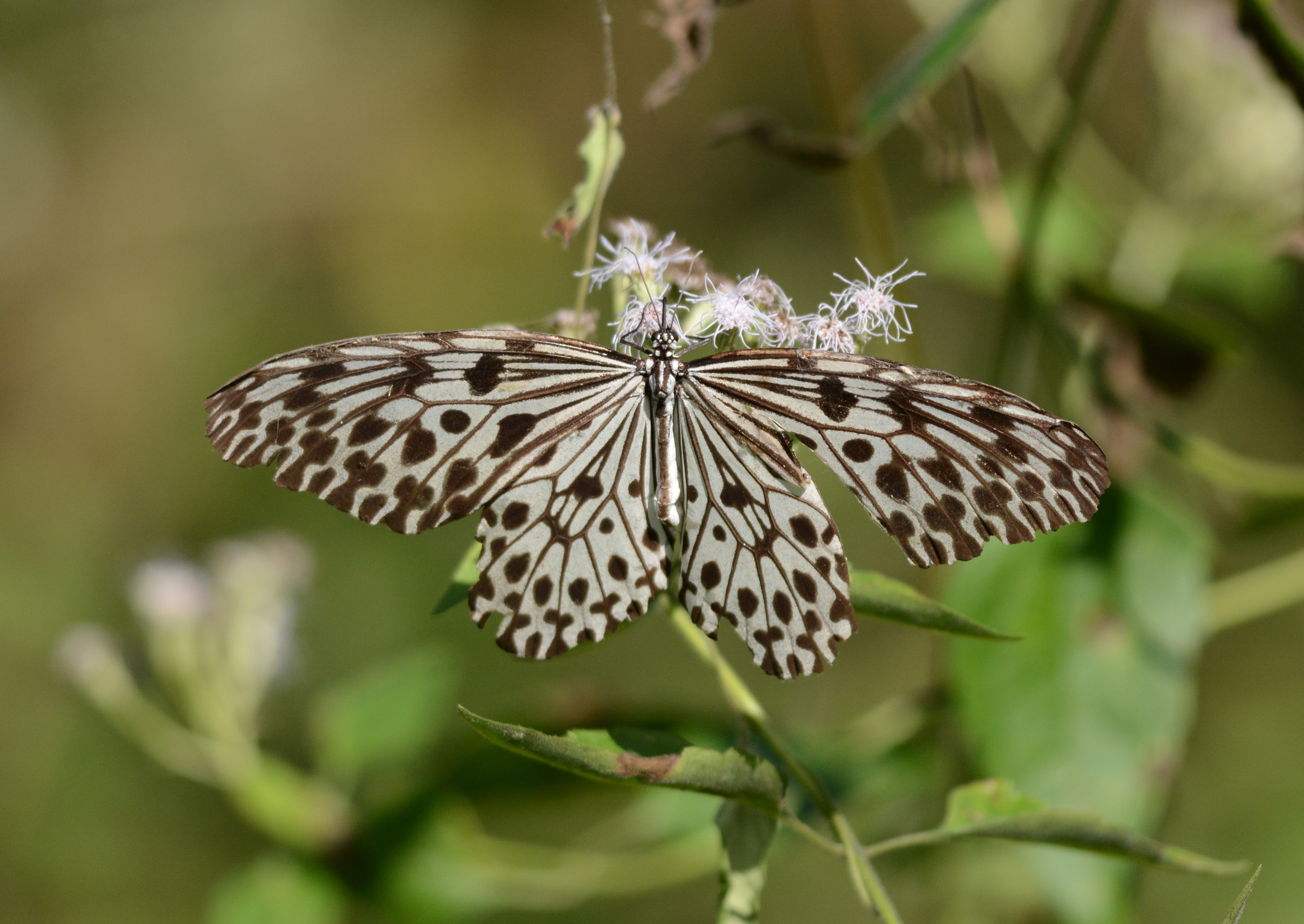
Dorsal view

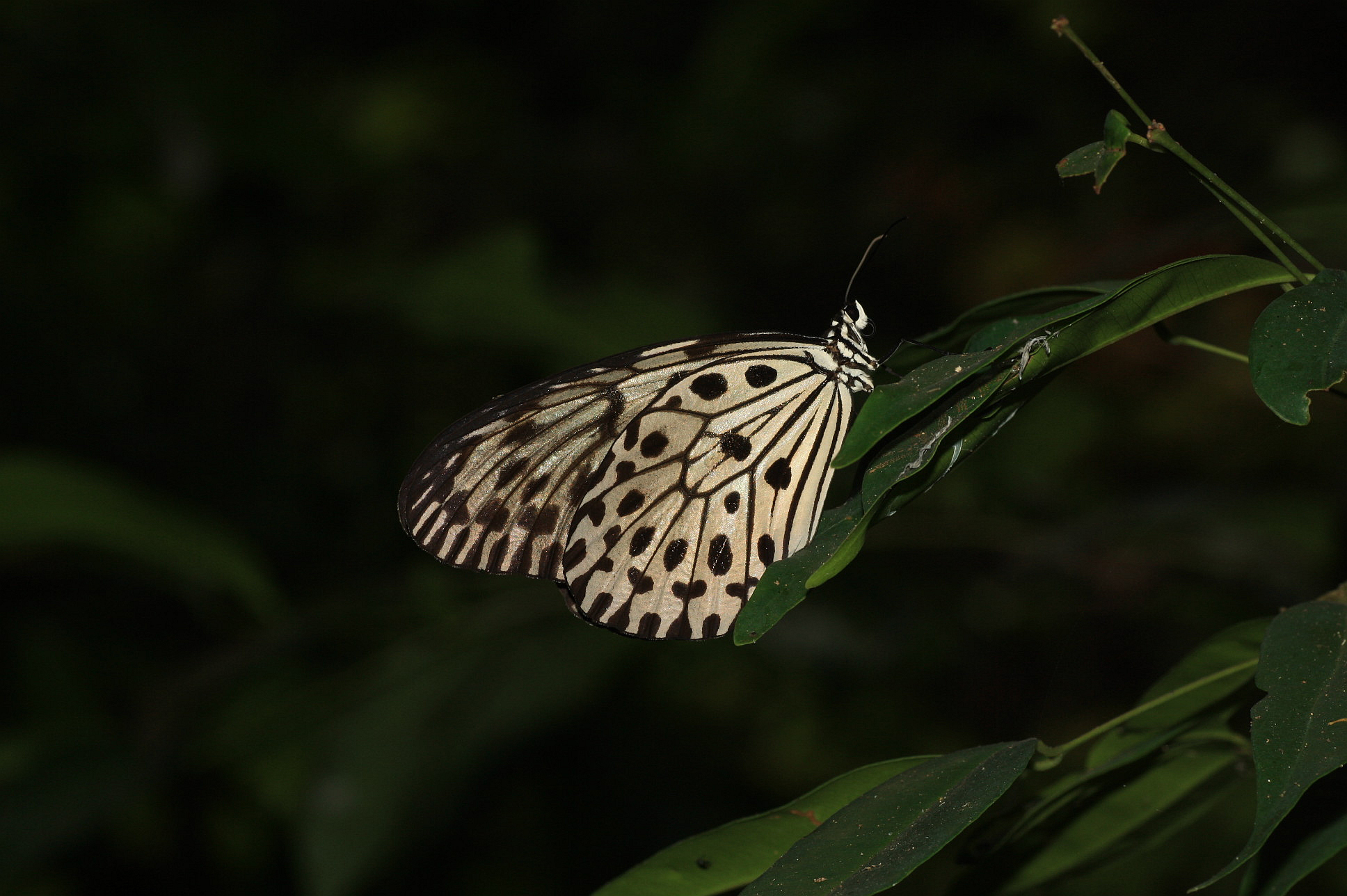
Ventral view

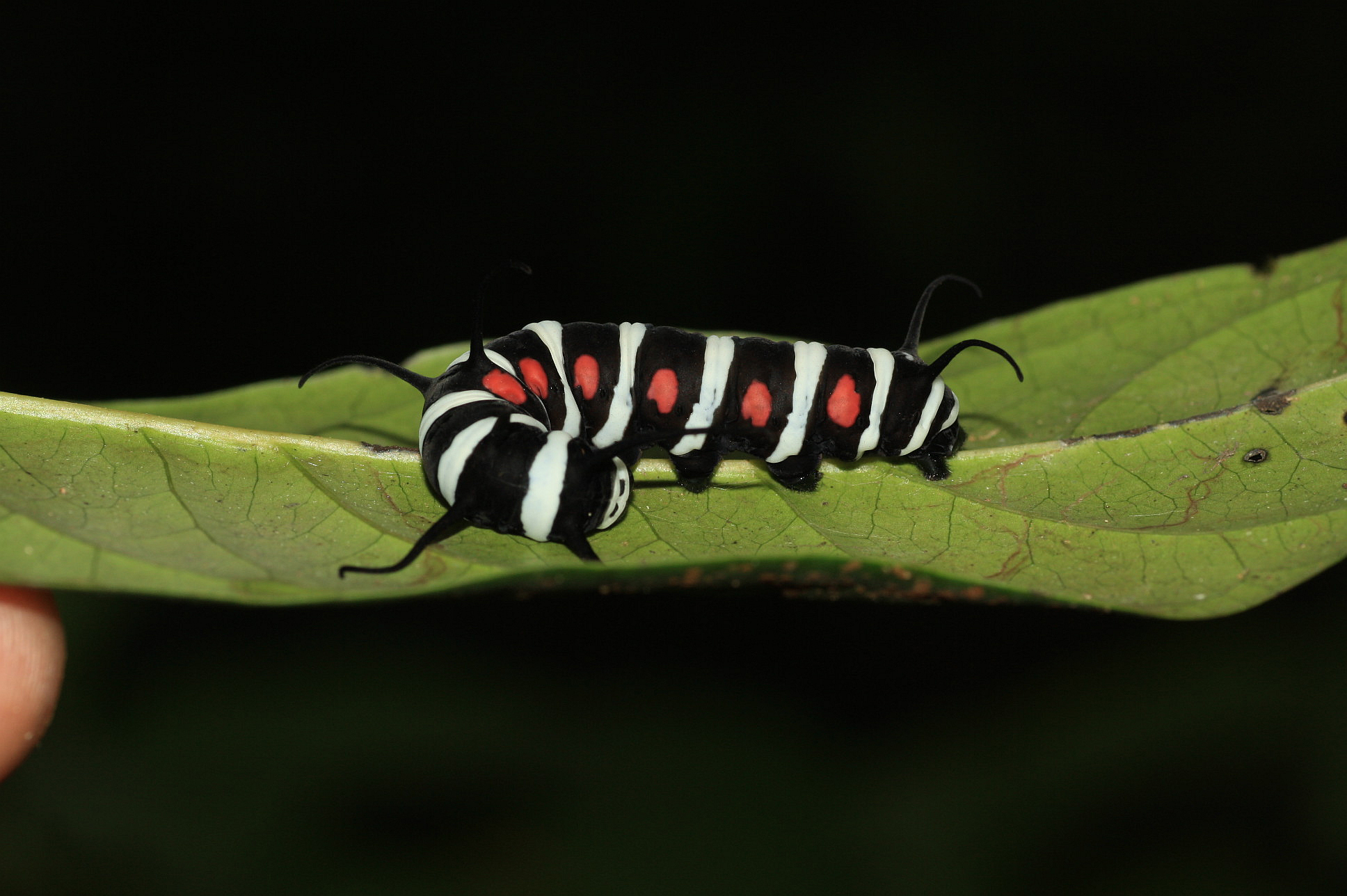
Larva

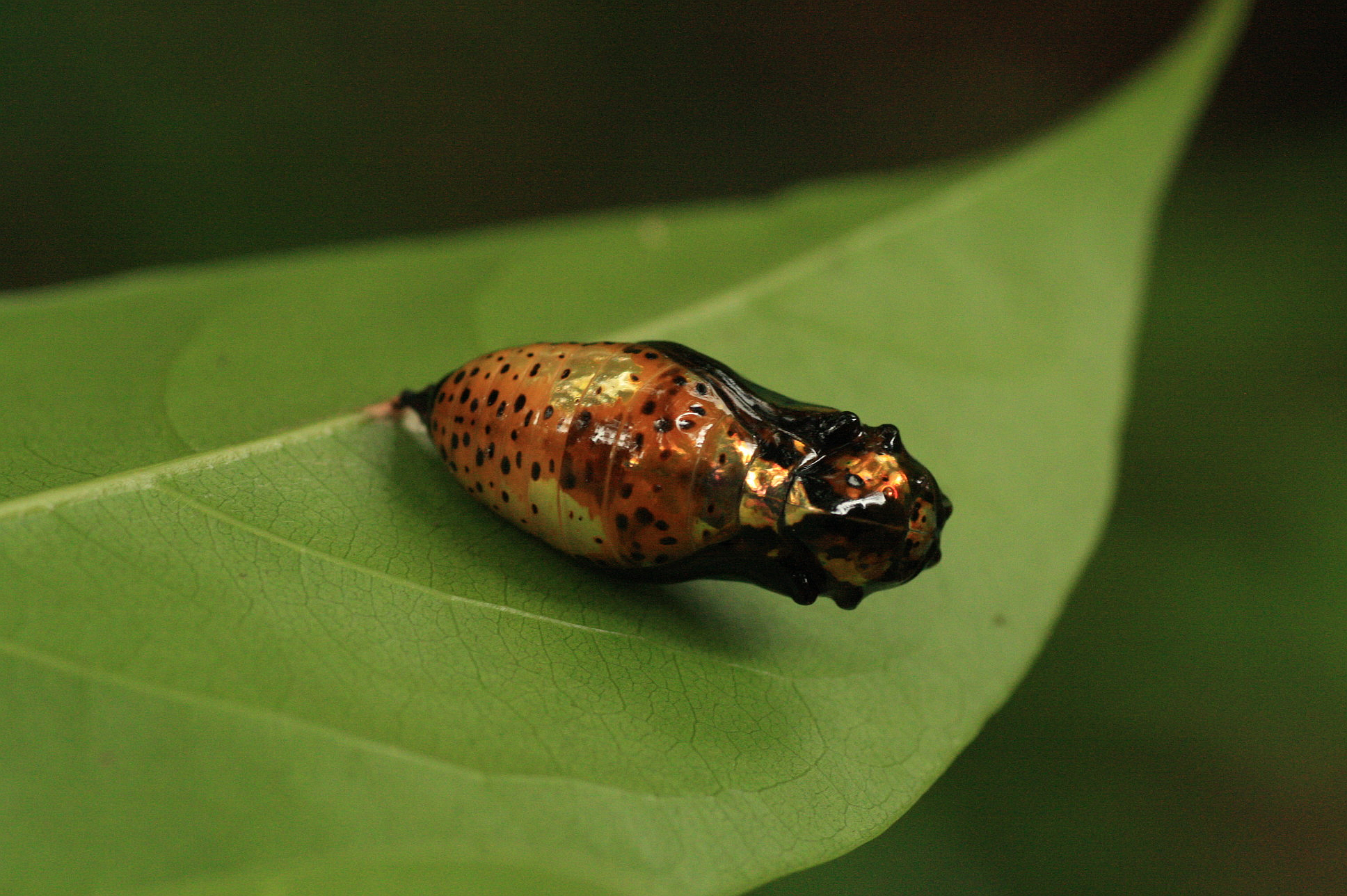
Pupa

==== Genus: Parantica (glassy tigers) ====
===== Parantica aglea (glassy tiger) =====
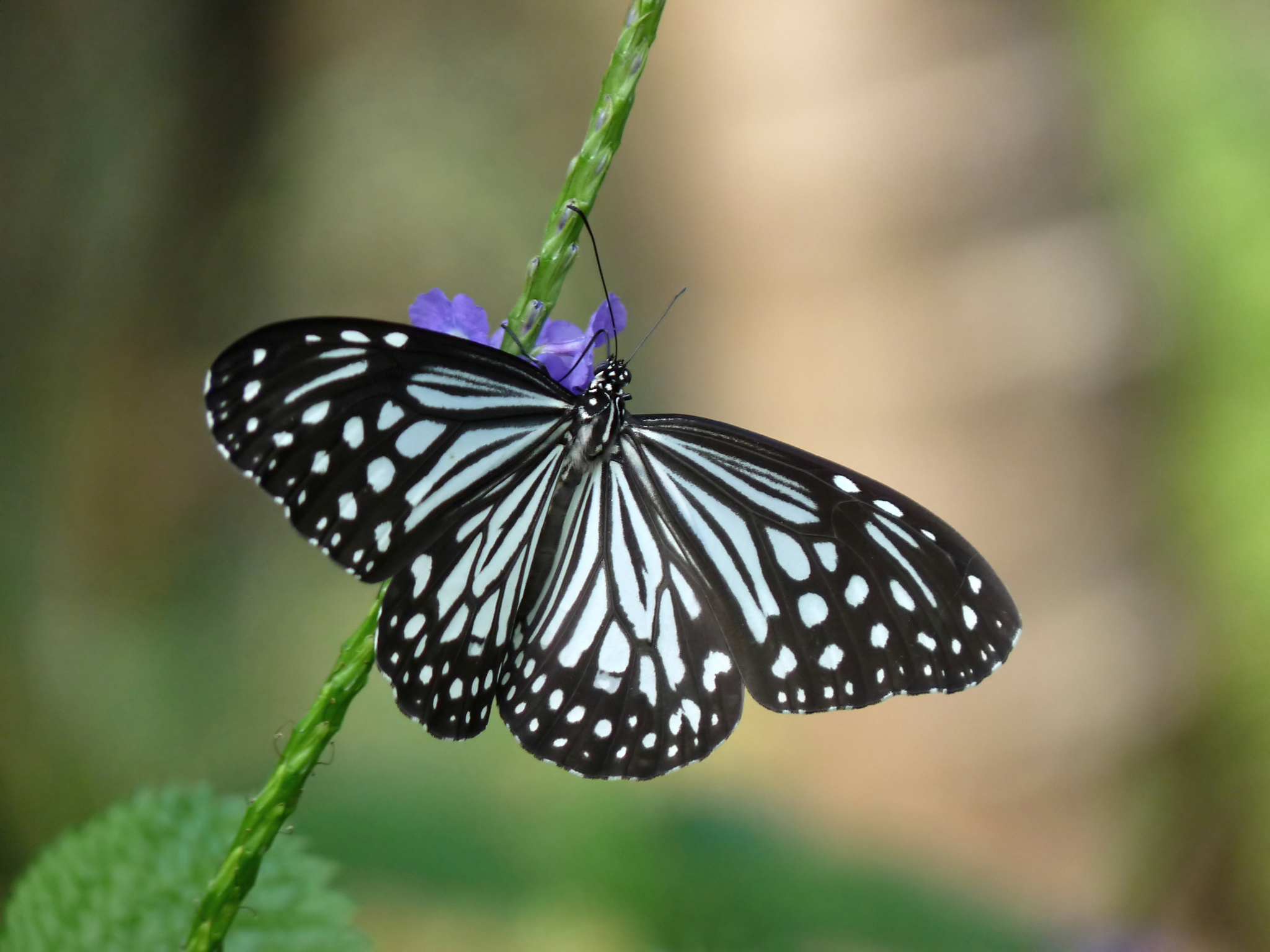
Dorsal view

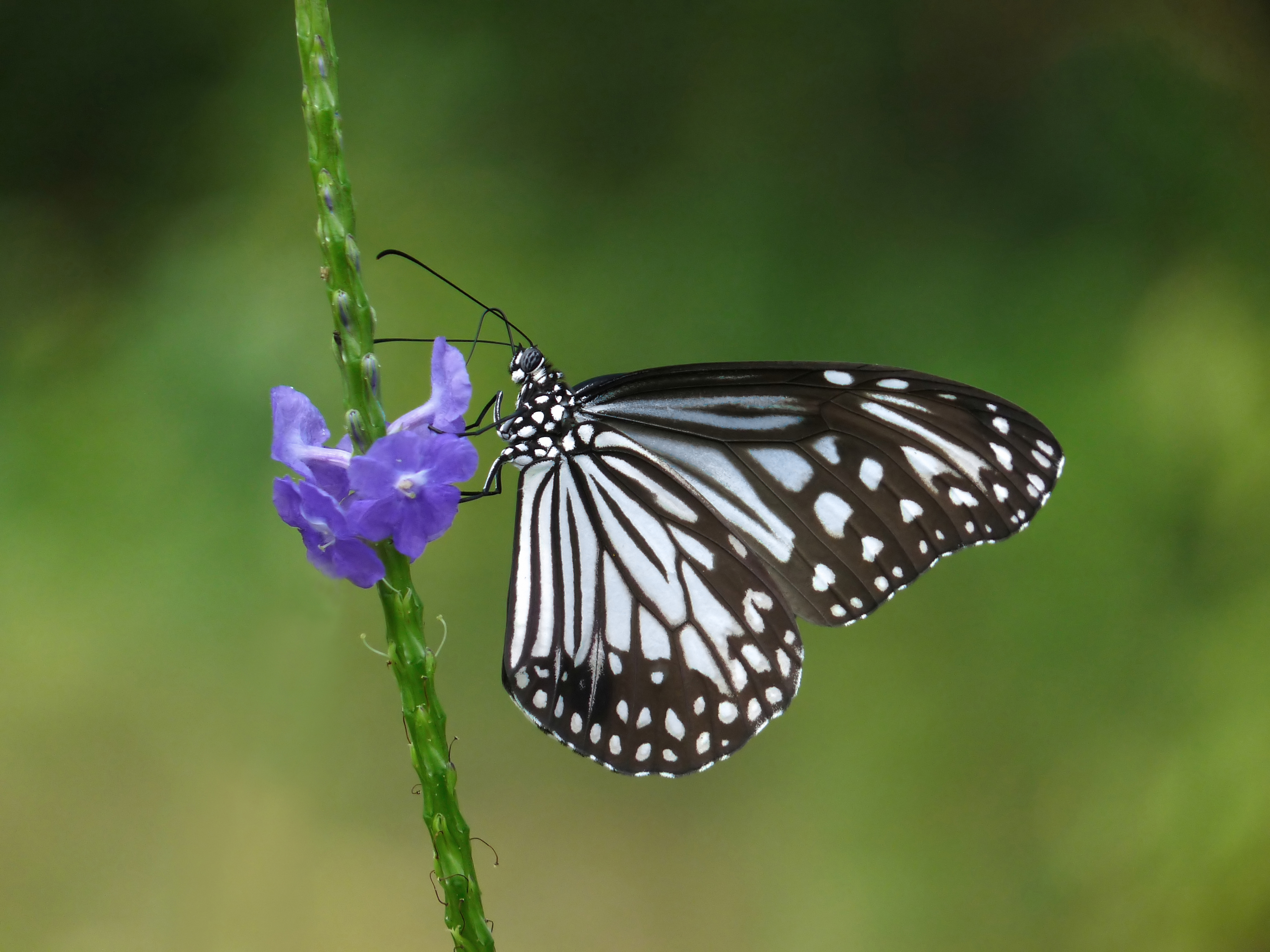
Ventral view

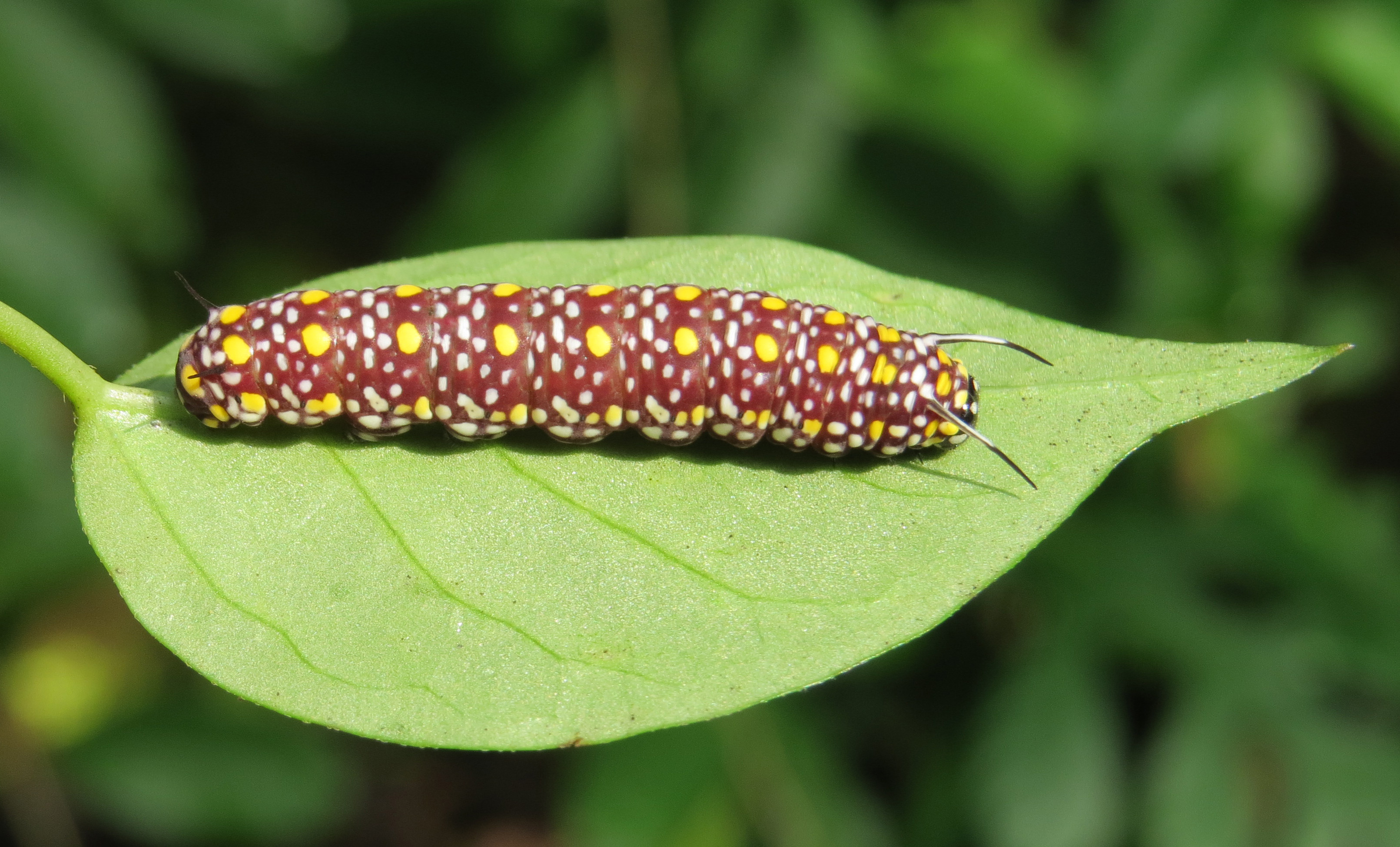
Larva

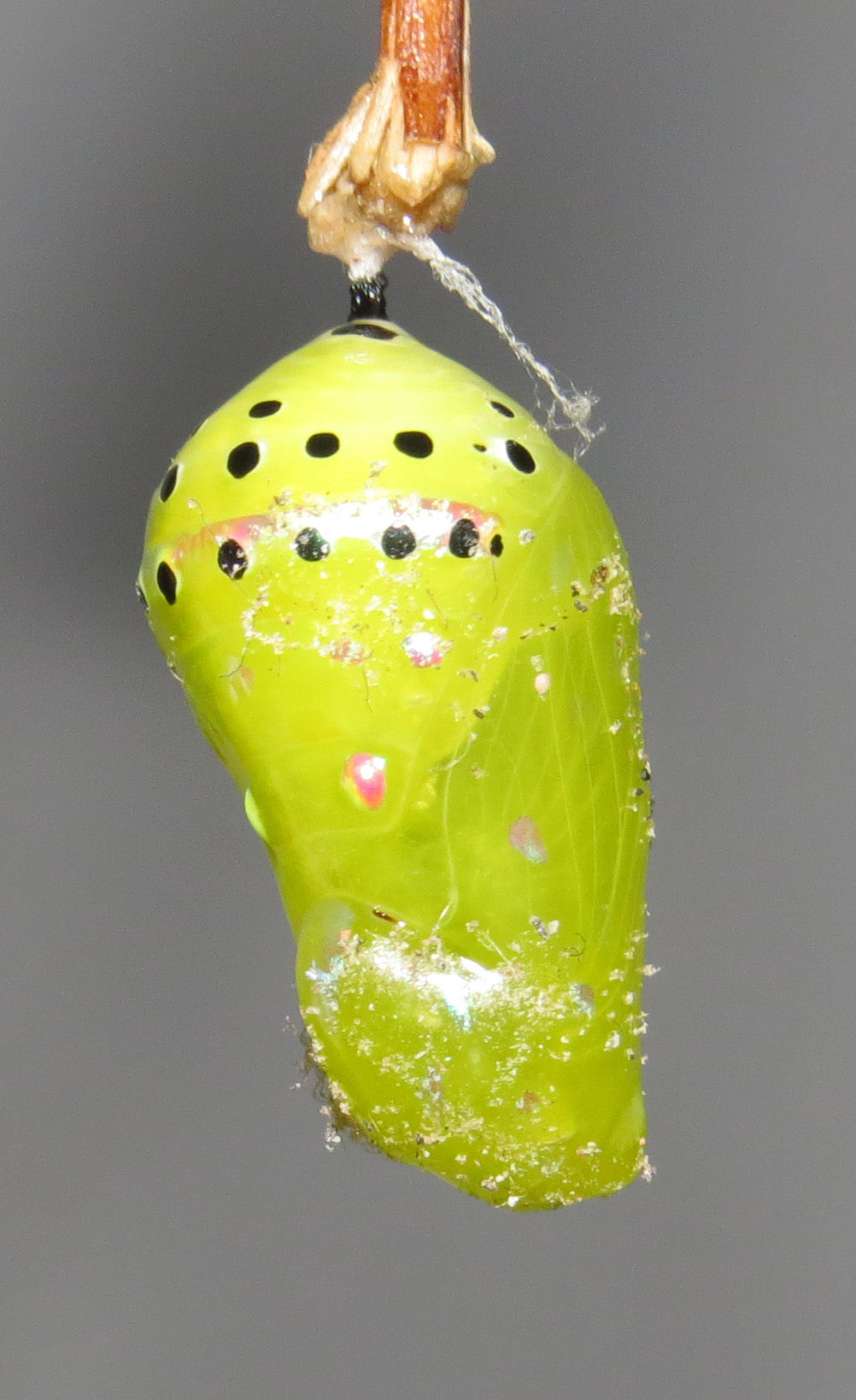
Pupa

===== Parantica nilgiriensis (Nilgiri tiger) =====
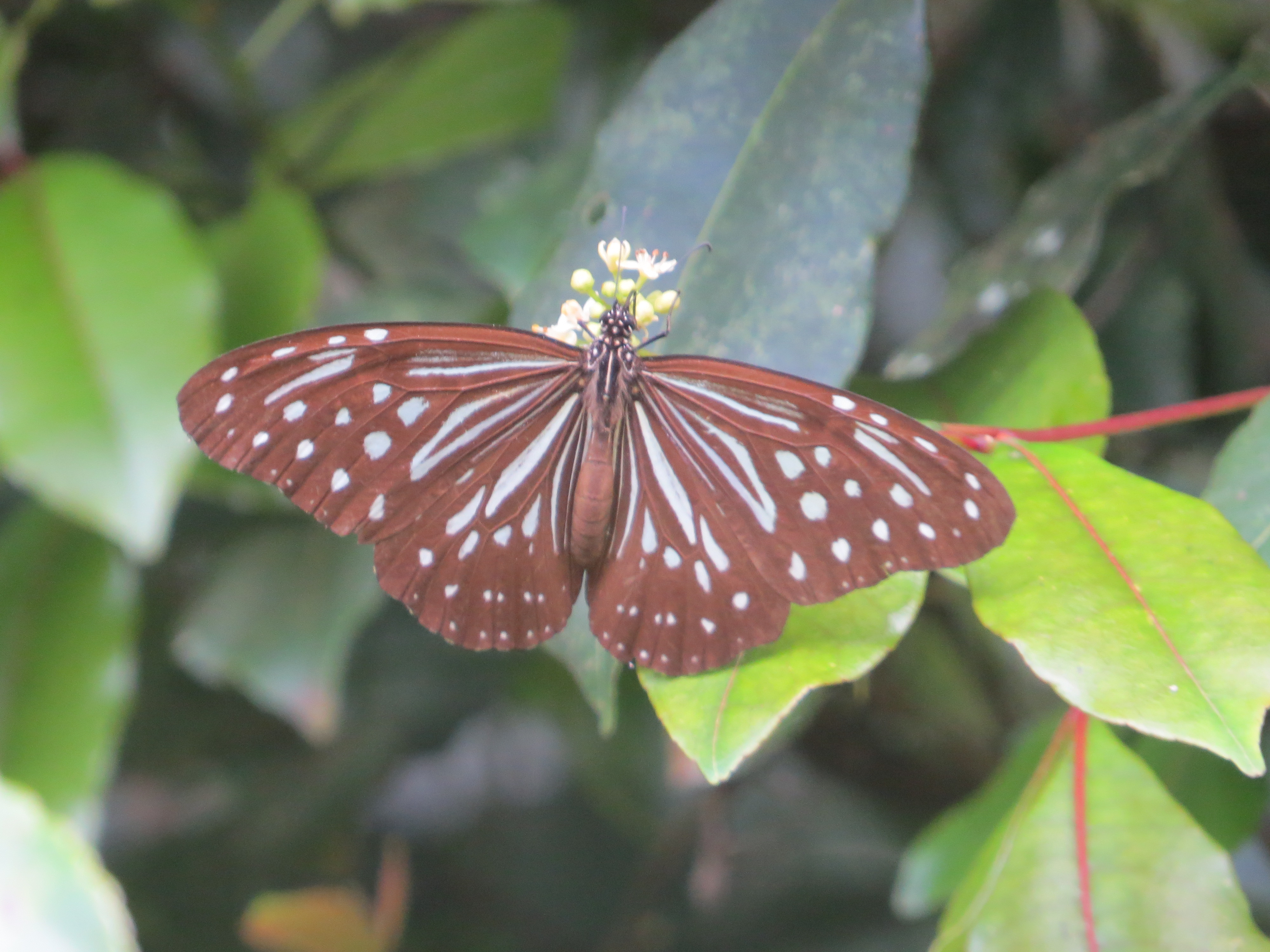
Dorsal view

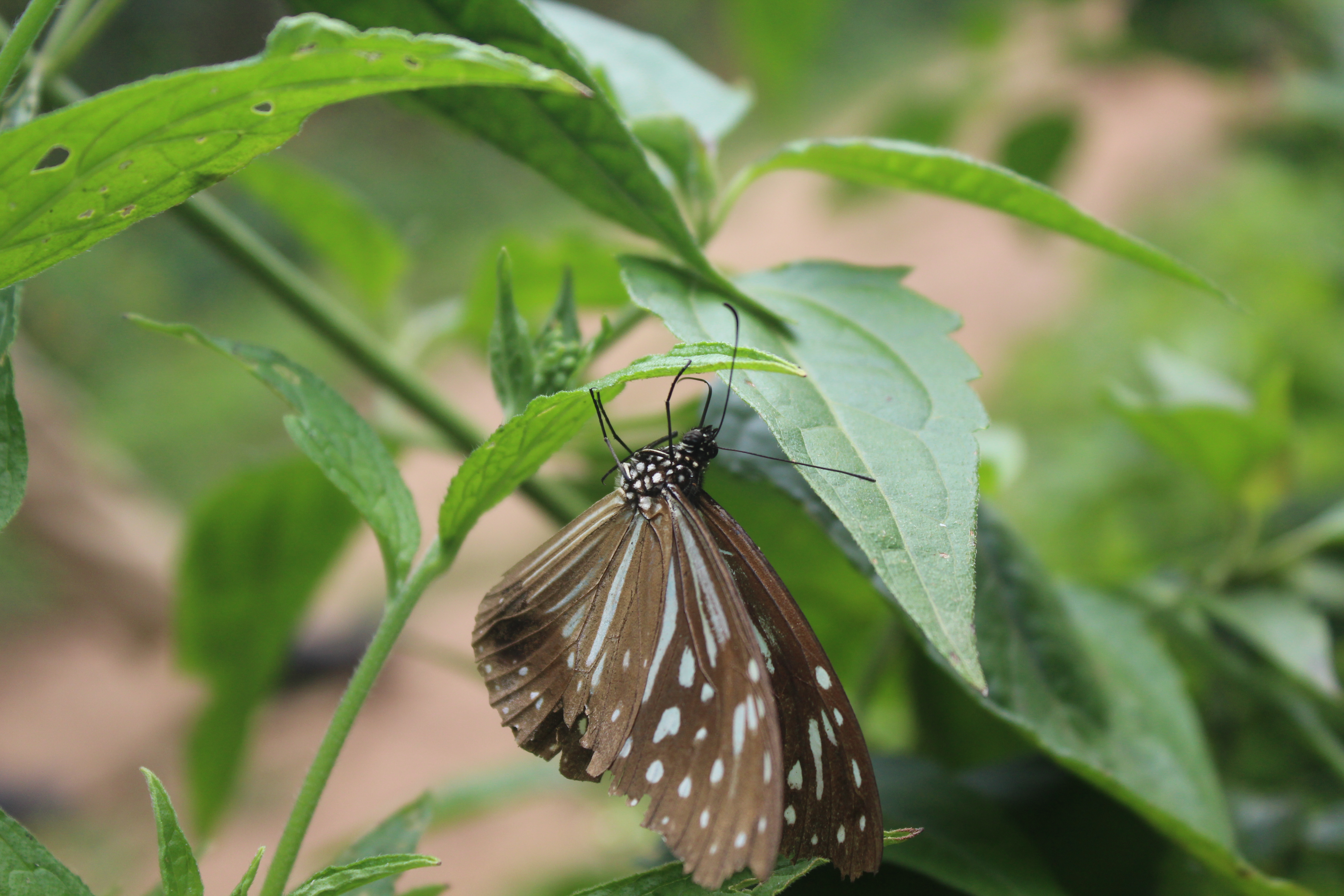
Ventral view

==== Genus: Tirumala (blue tigers) ====
===== Tirumala limniace (blue tiger) =====
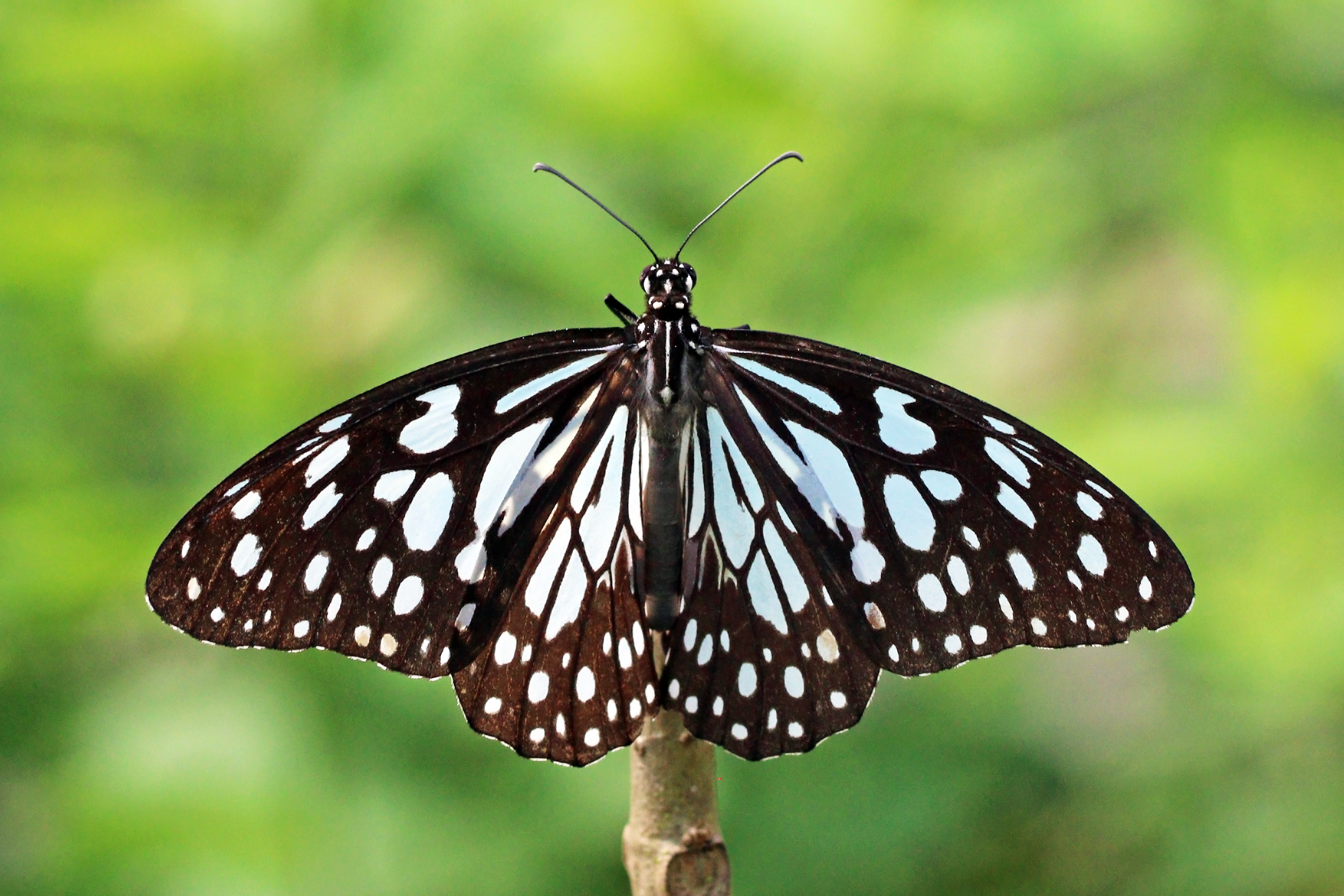
Dorsal view

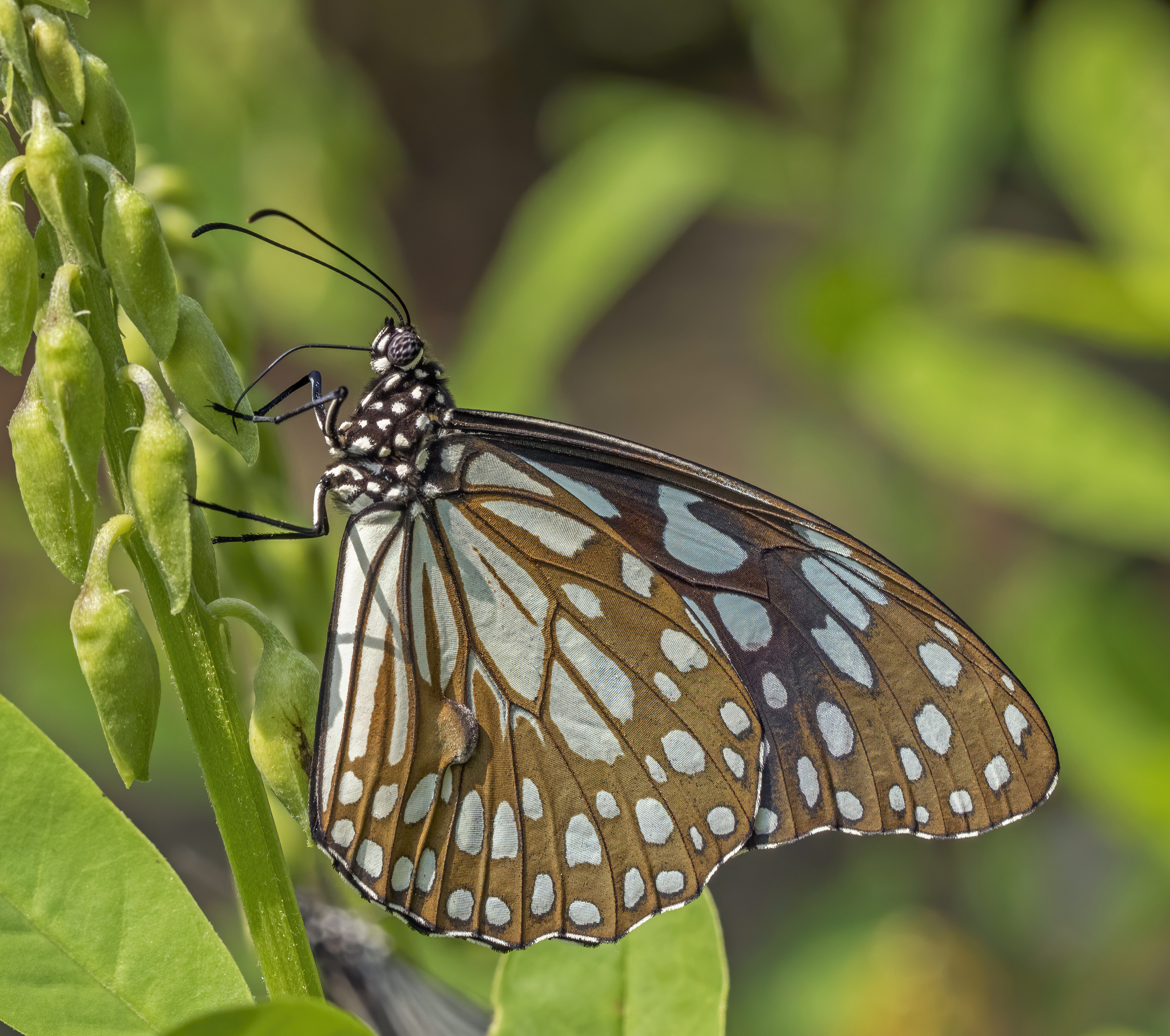
Ventral view

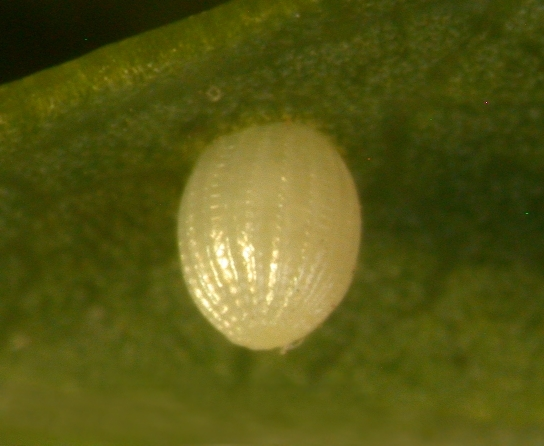
Egg

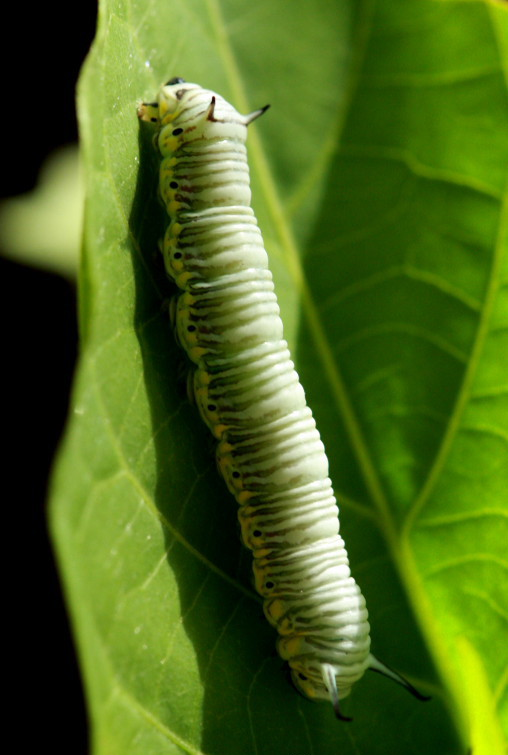
Larva

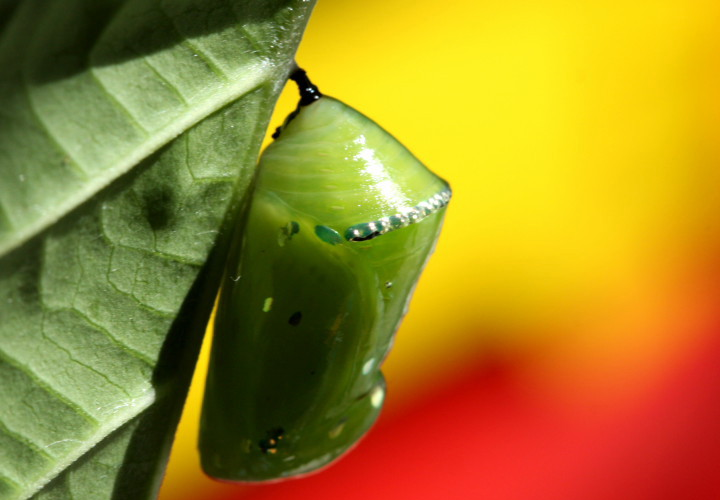
Pupa

===== Tirumala septentrionis (dark blue tiger) =====
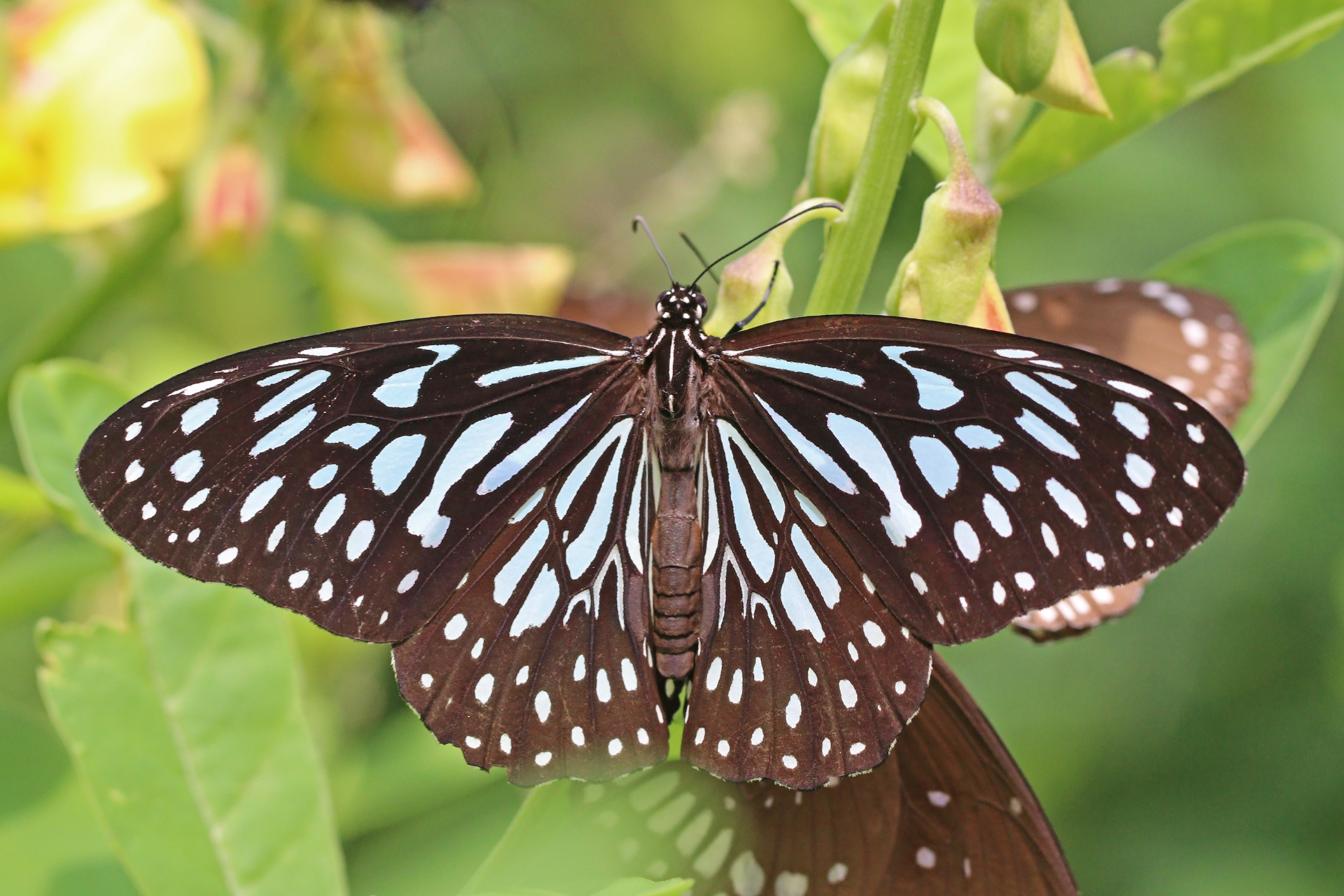
Dorsal view

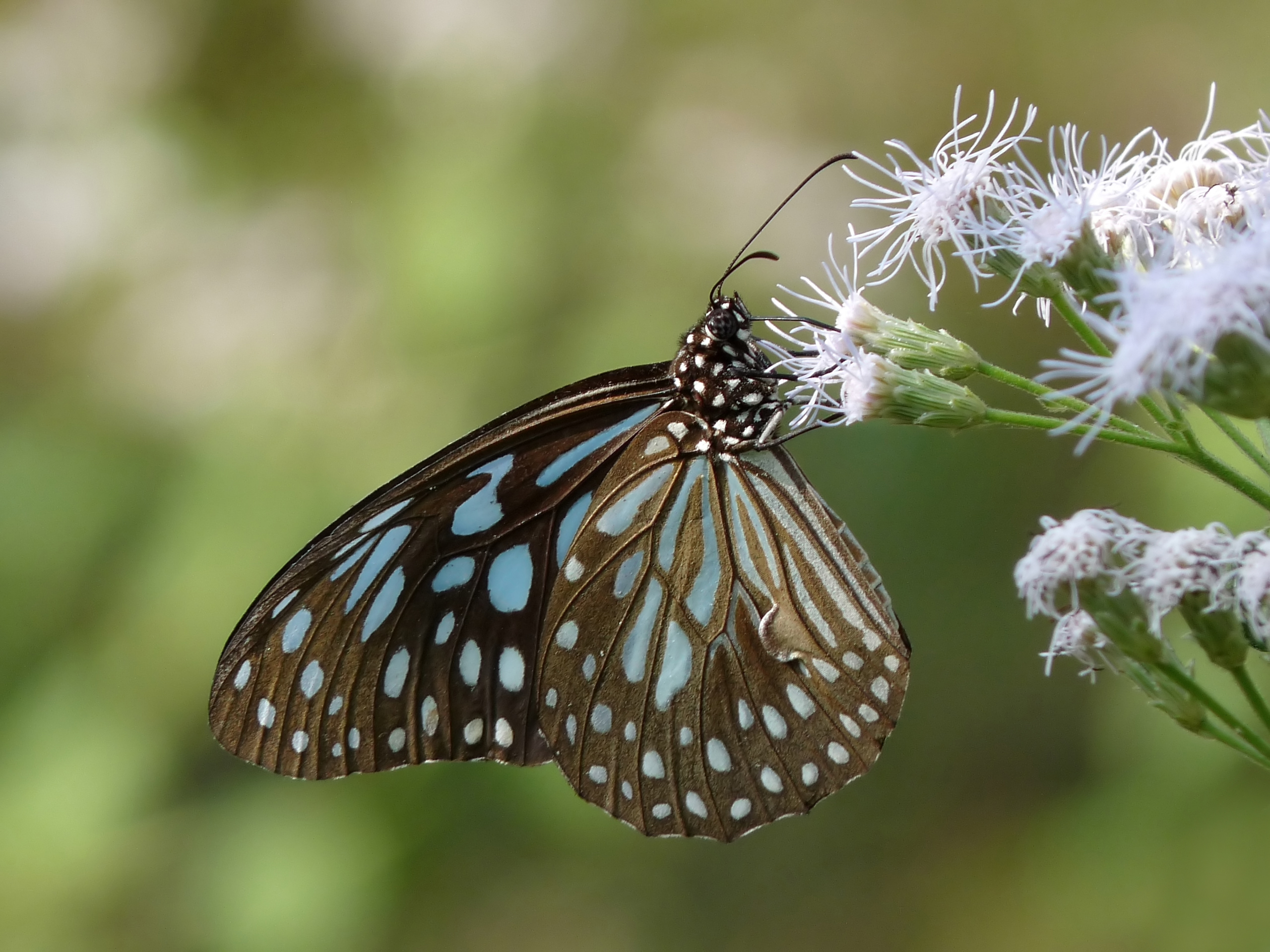
Ventral view

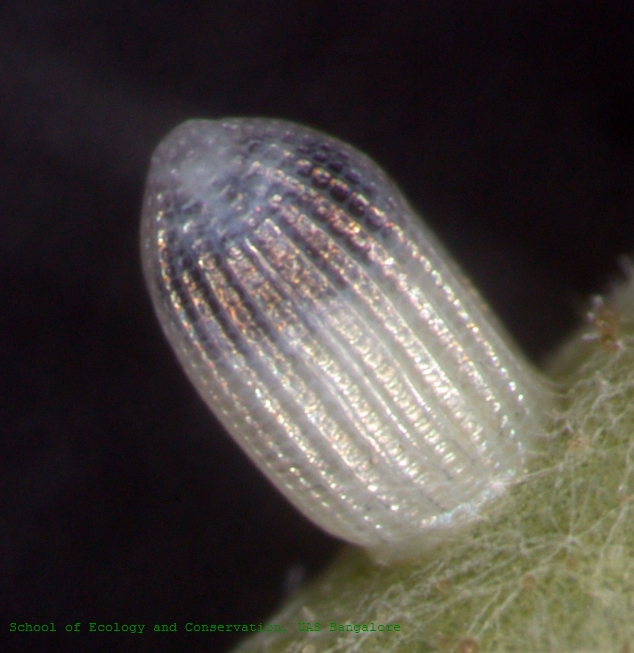
Egg

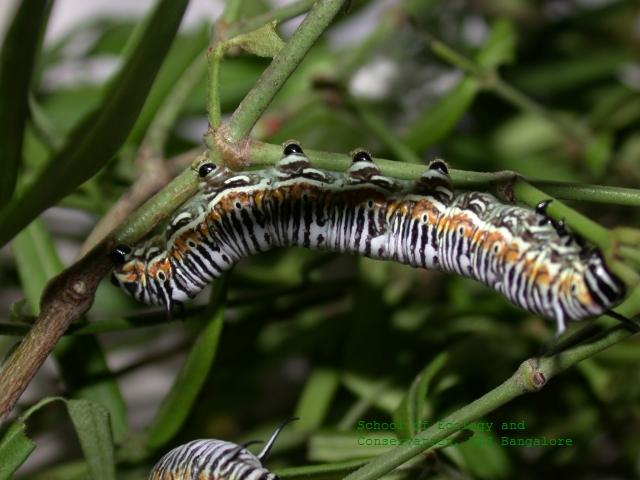
Larva

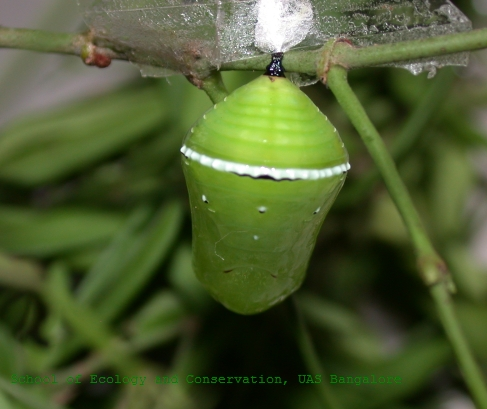
Pupa

=== Subfamily: Heliconiinae ===
==== Genus: Acraea (costers) ====
===== Acraea terpsicore/violae (tawny coster) =====
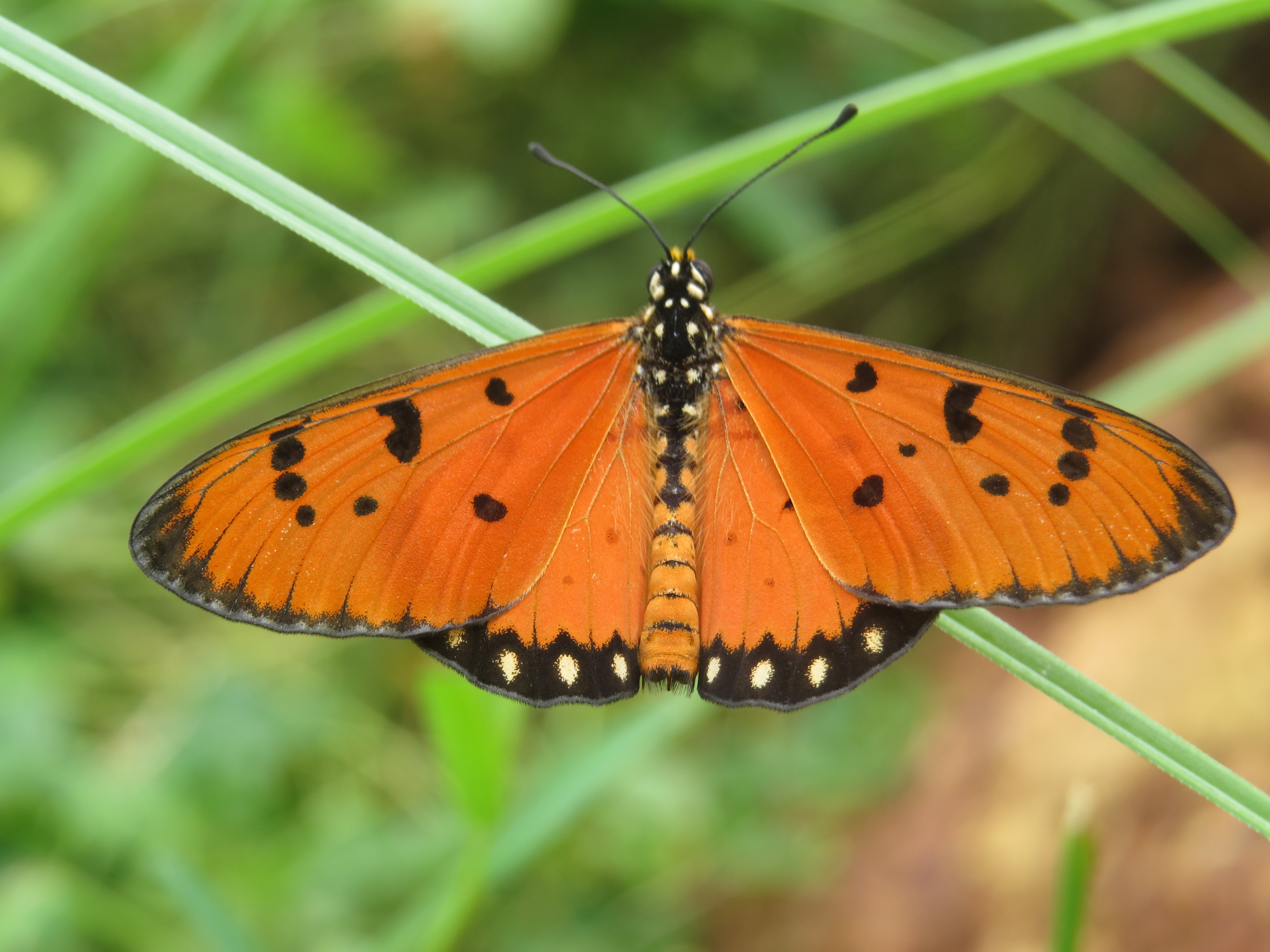
Dorsal view

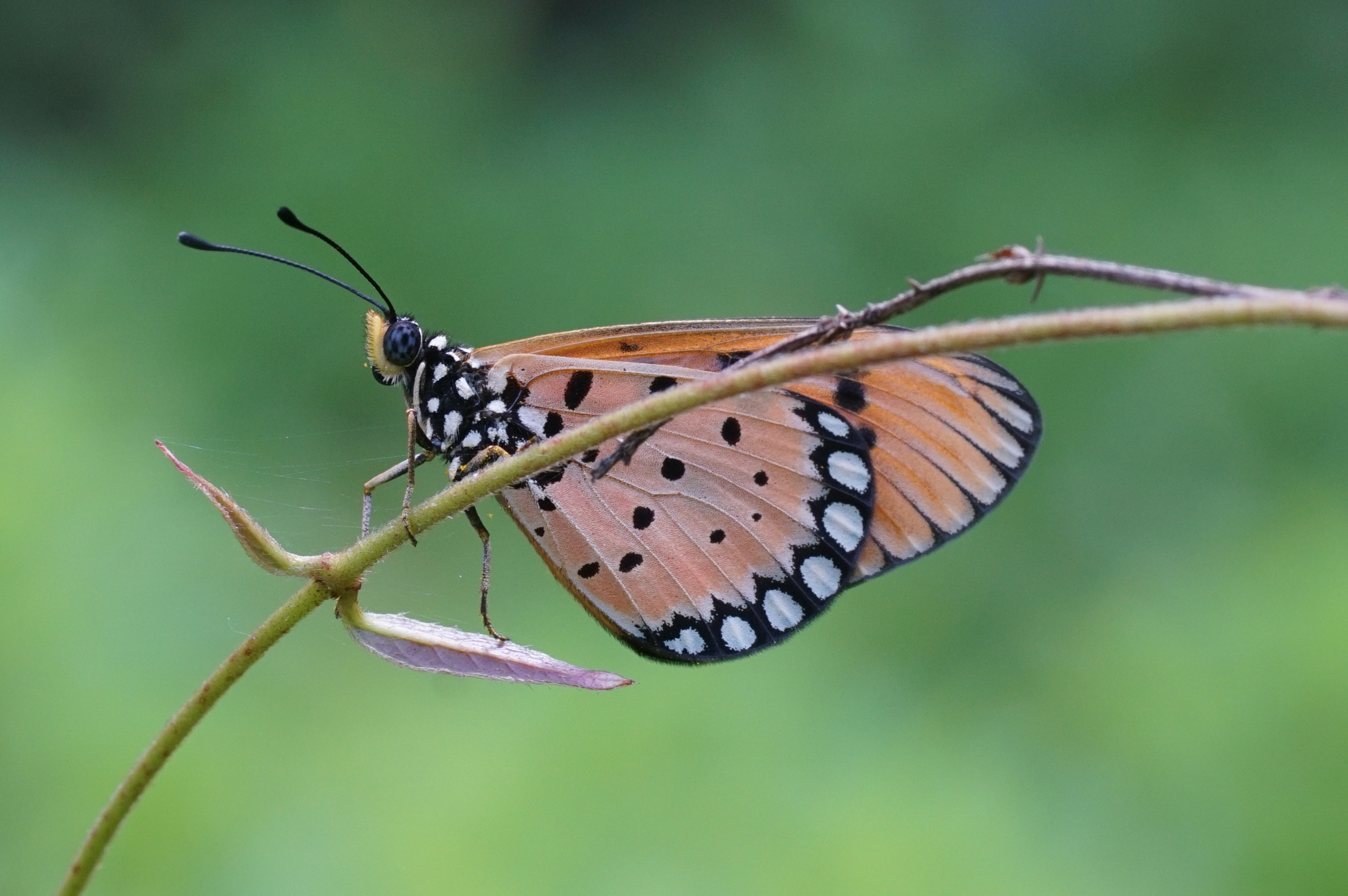
Ventral view

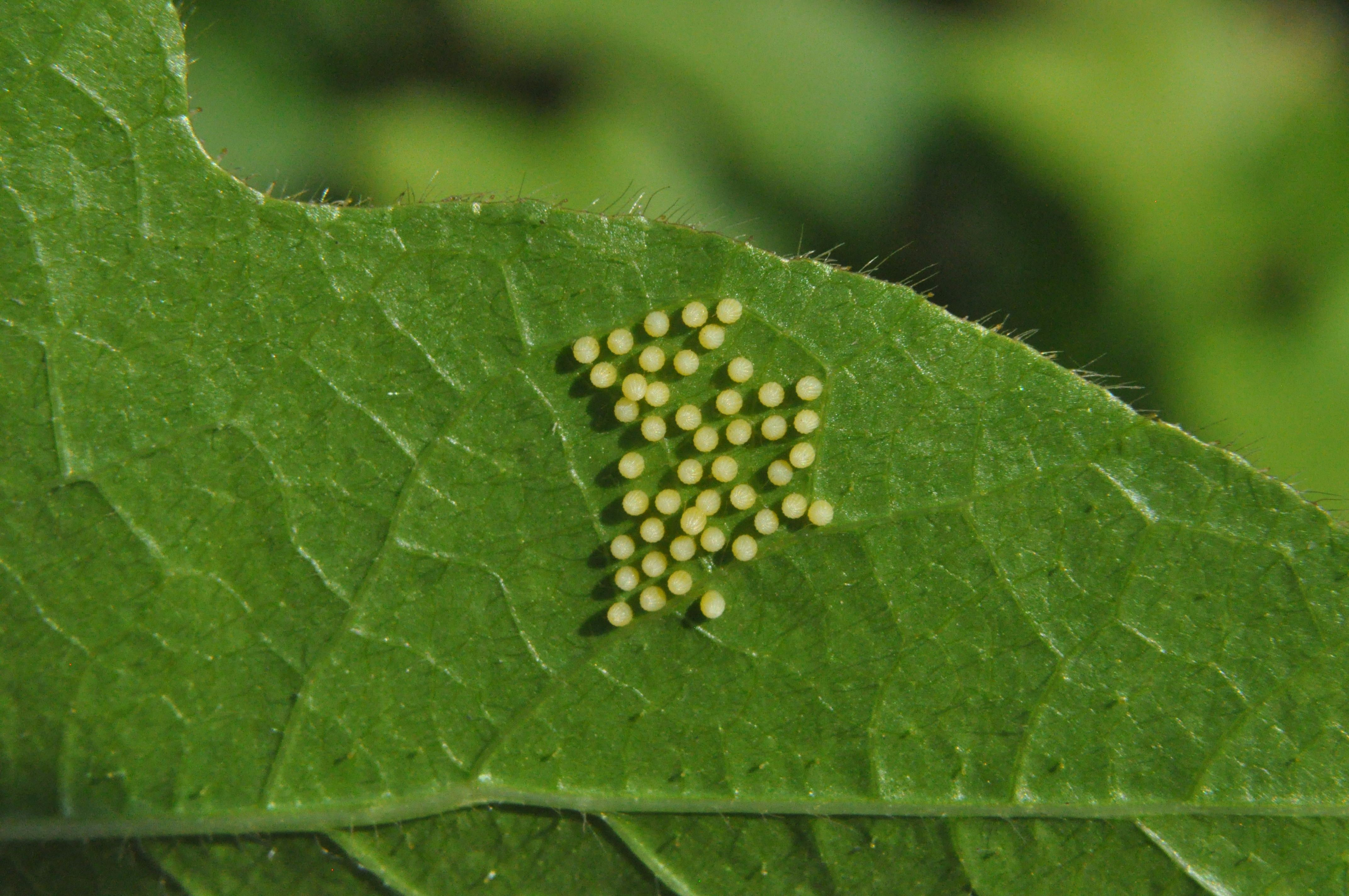
Eggs

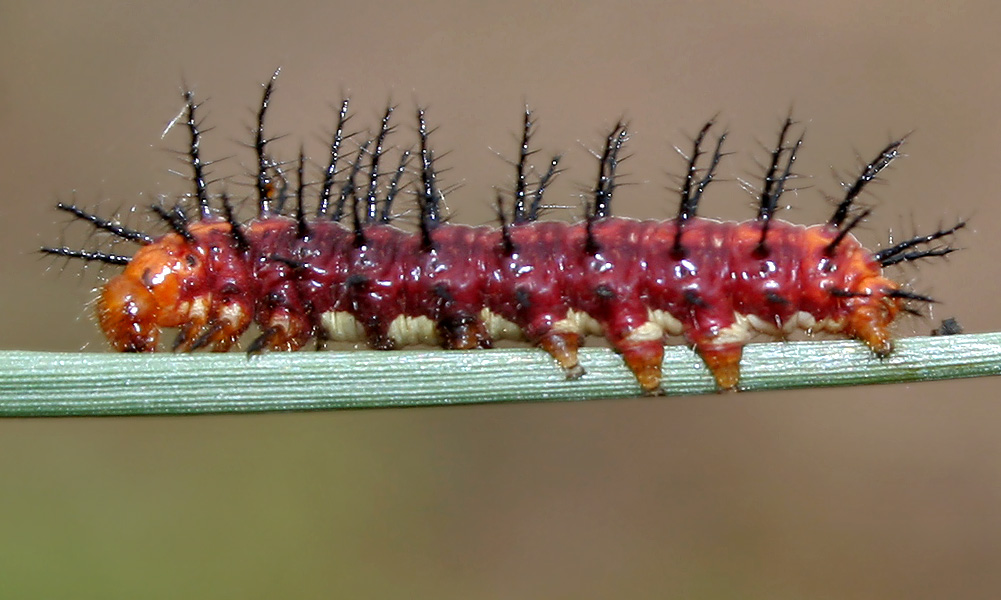
Larva

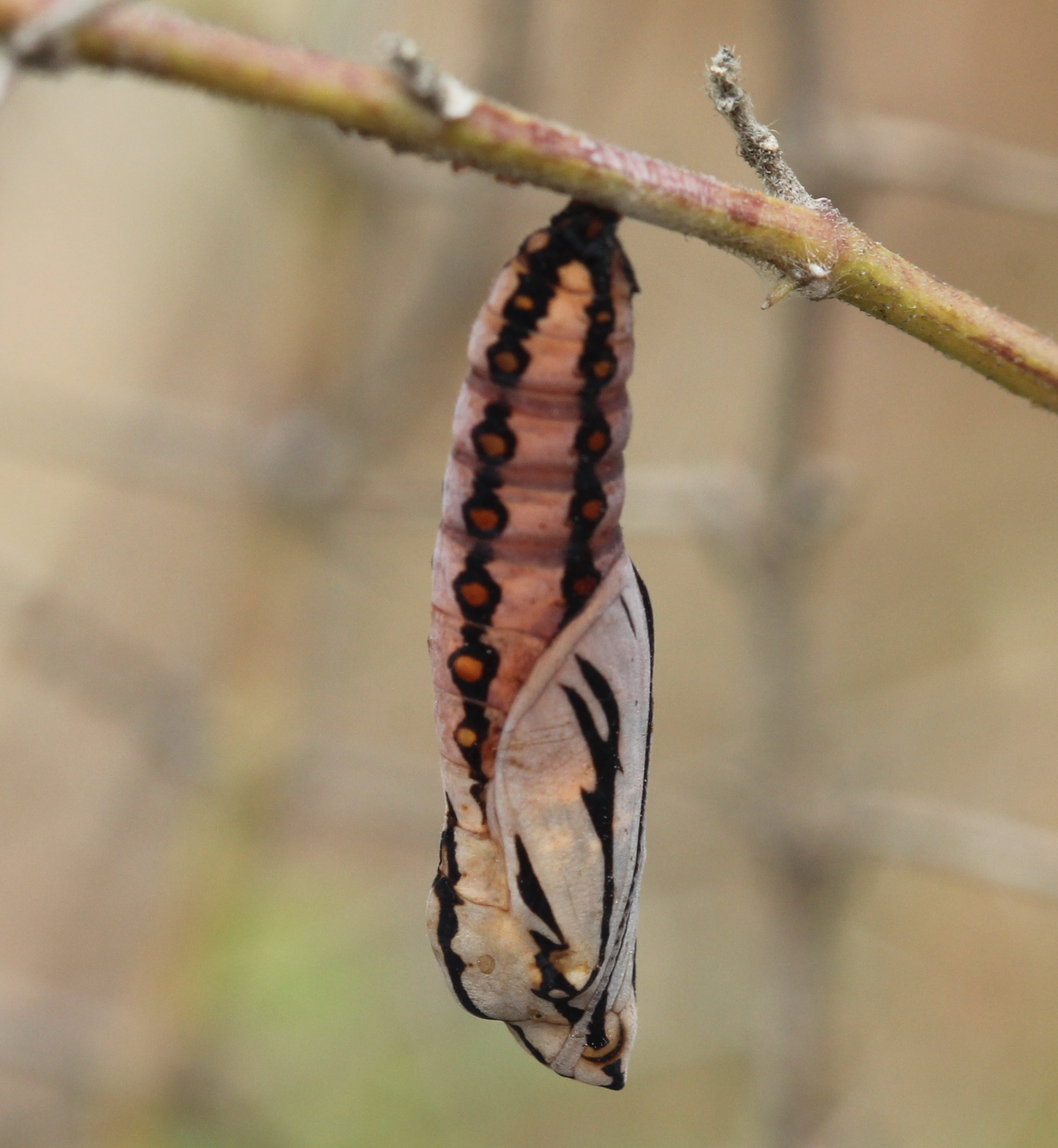
Pupa

==== Genus: Argynnis (fritillaries) ====
===== Argynnis hyperbius (Indian fritillary) =====
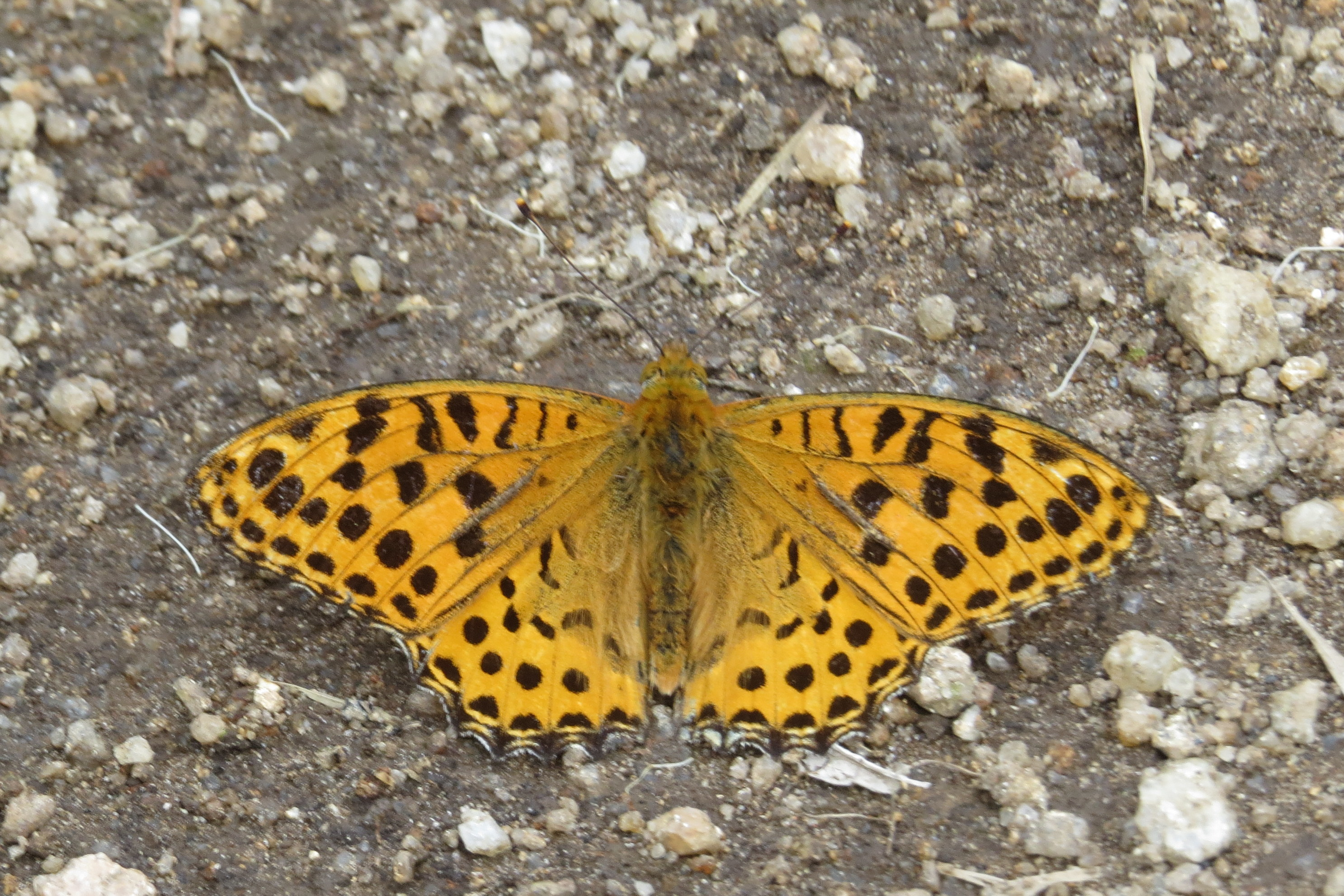
Dorsal view (male)

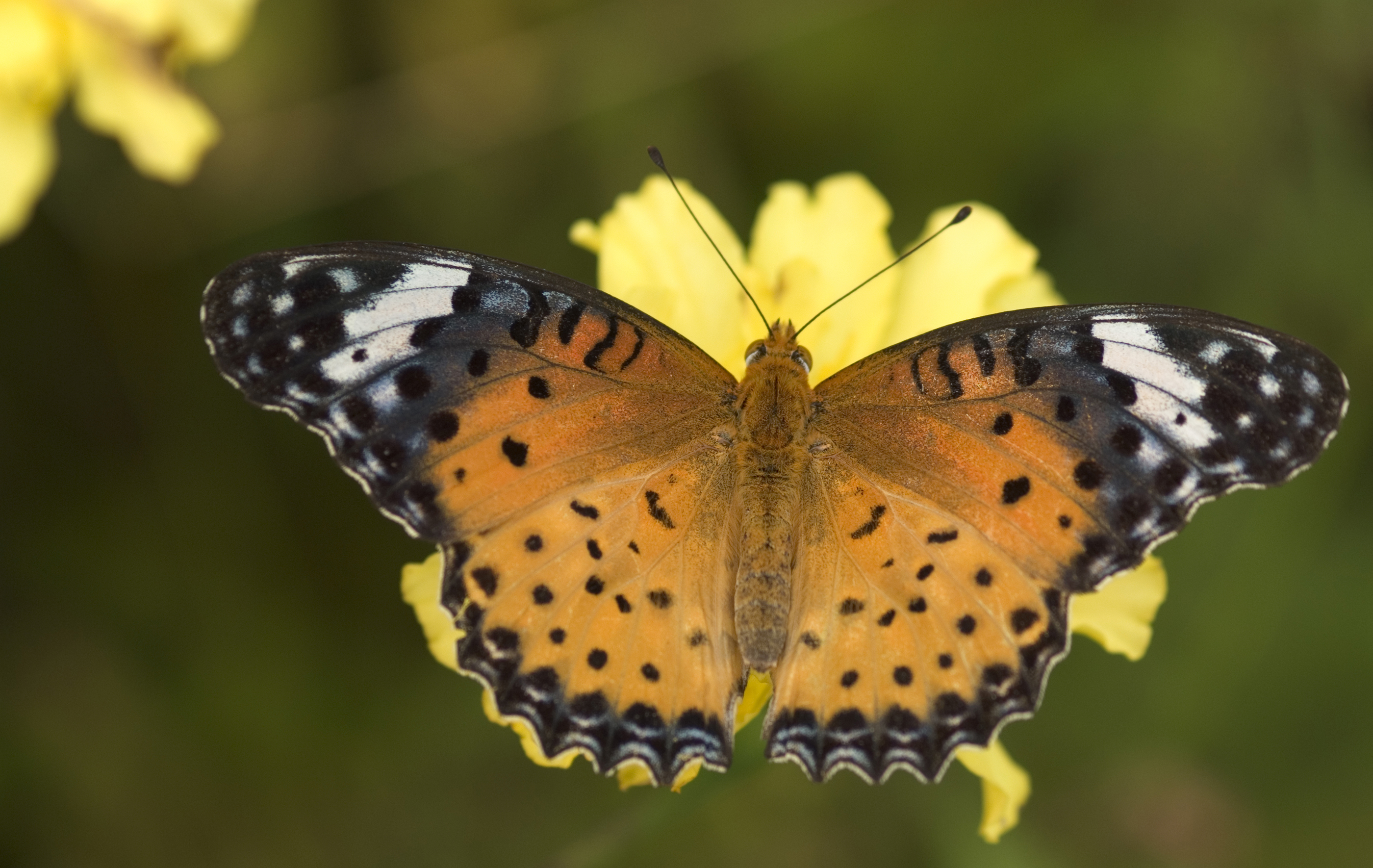
Dorsal view (female)

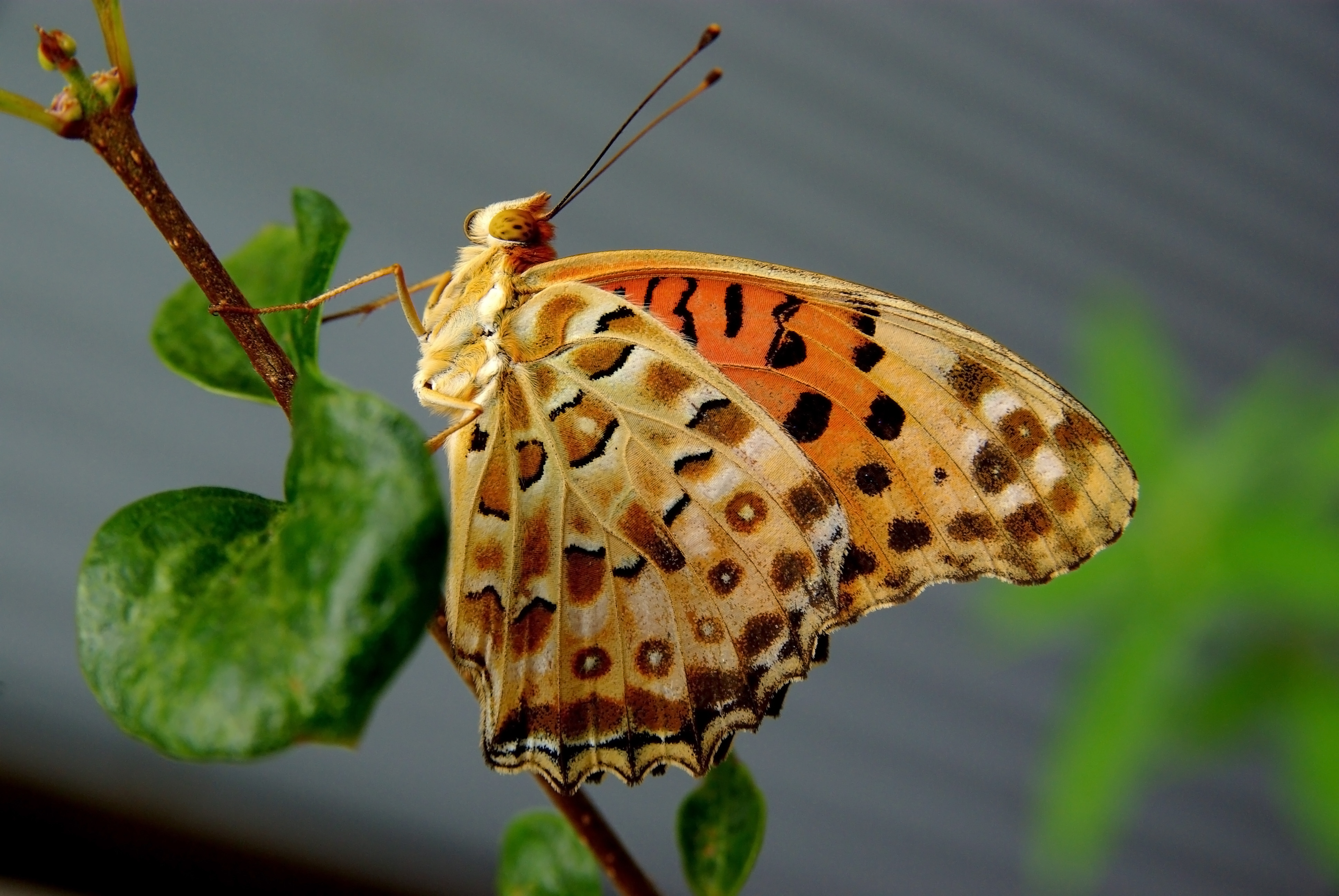
Ventral view

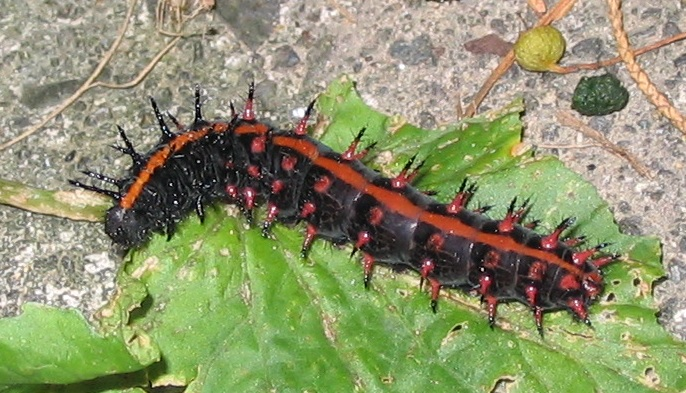
Larva

==== Genus: Cethosia (lacewings) ====
===== Cethosia nietneri mahratta (Tamil lacewing) =====
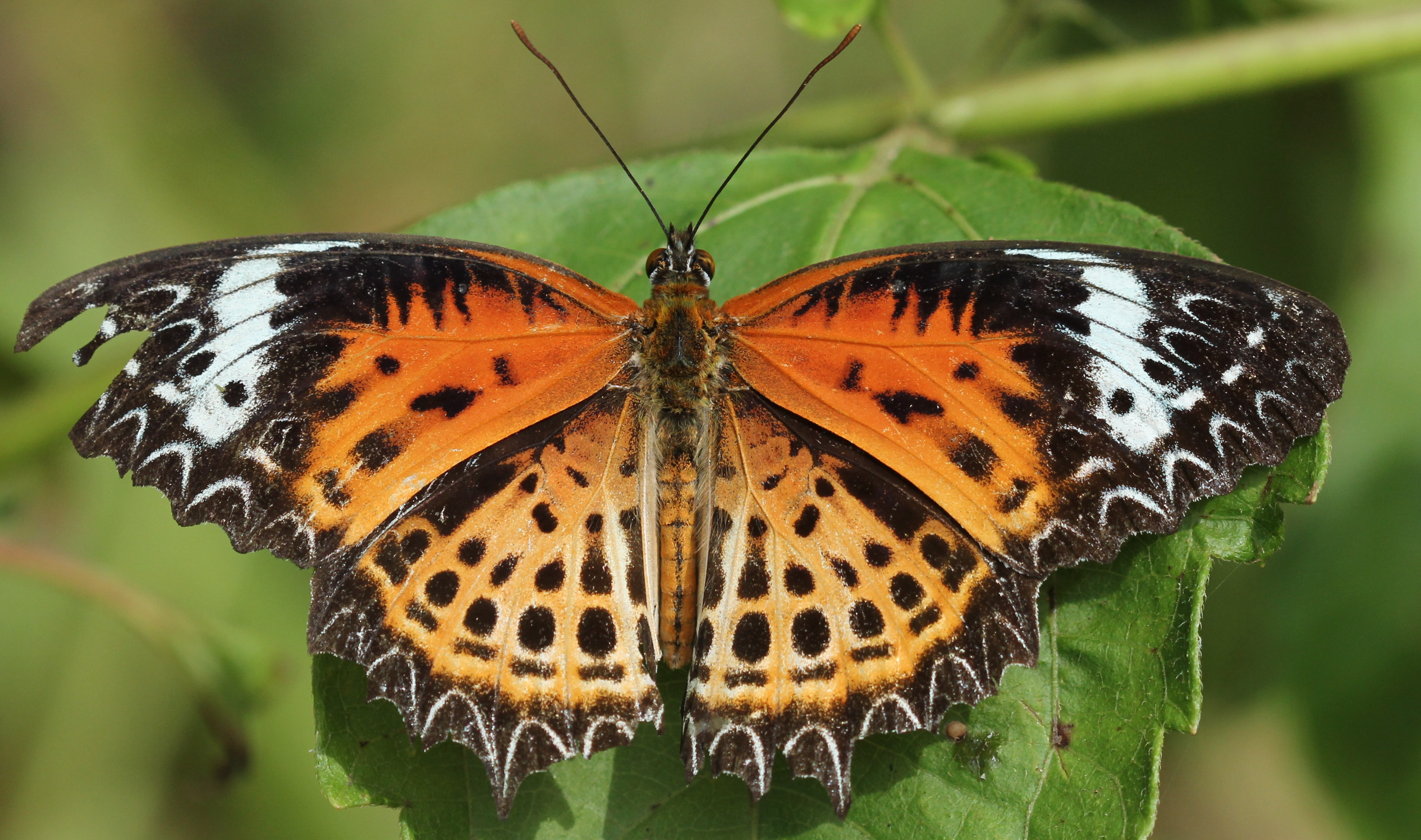
Dorsal view

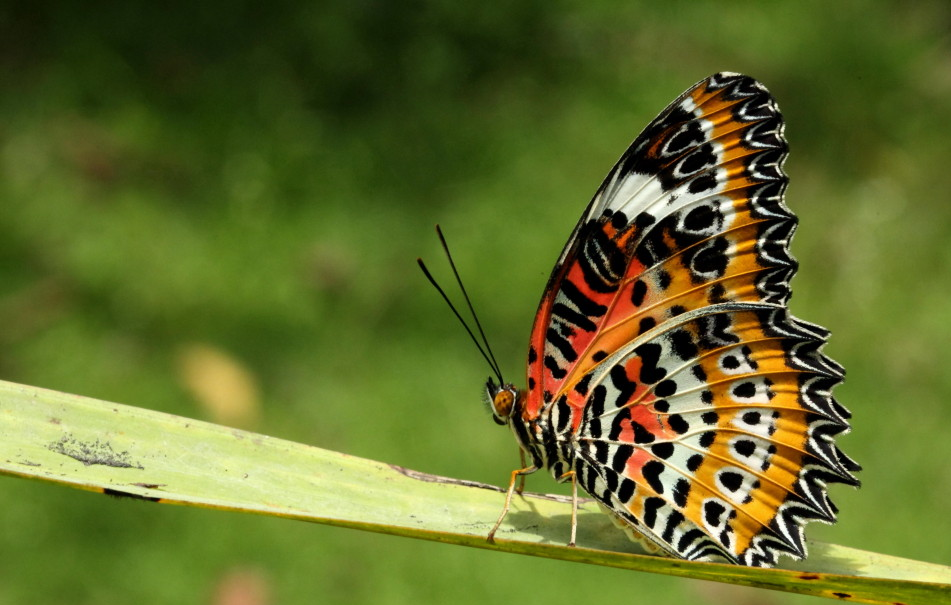
Ventral view

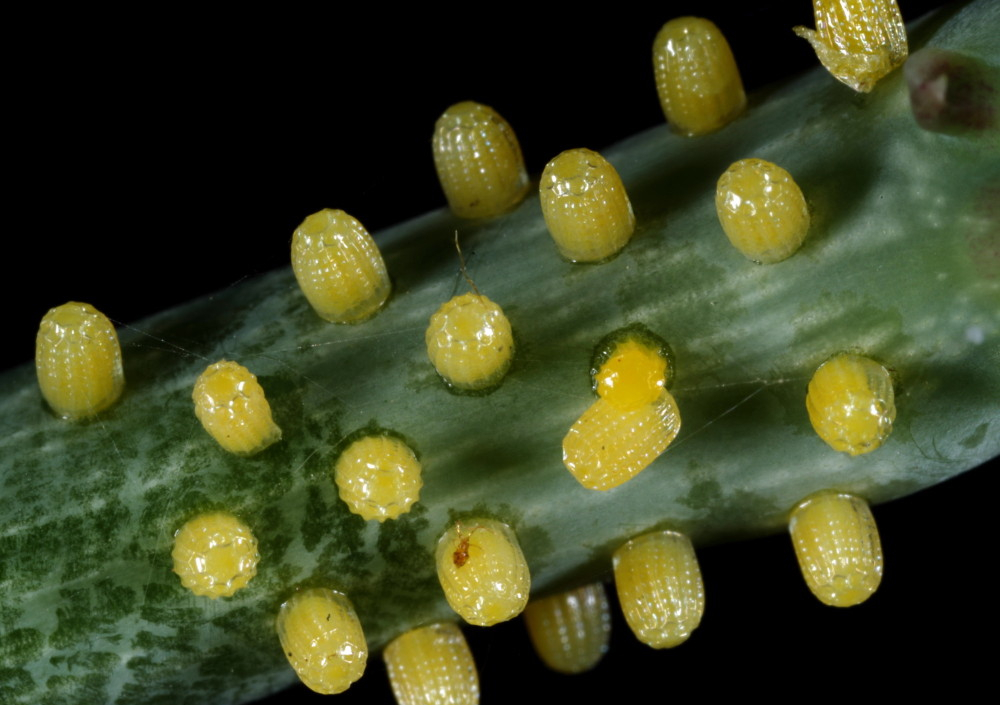
Eggs

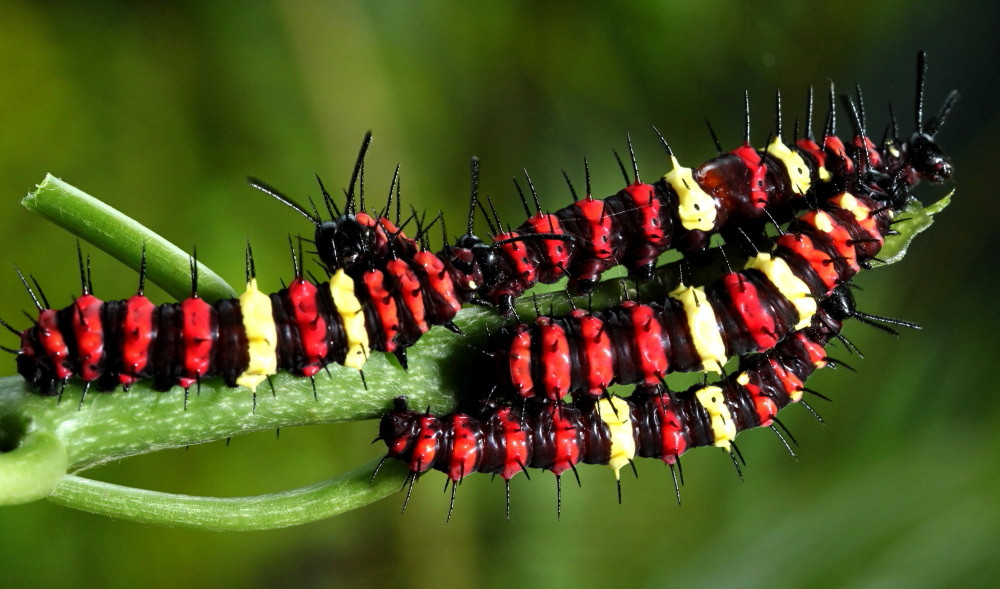
Larva

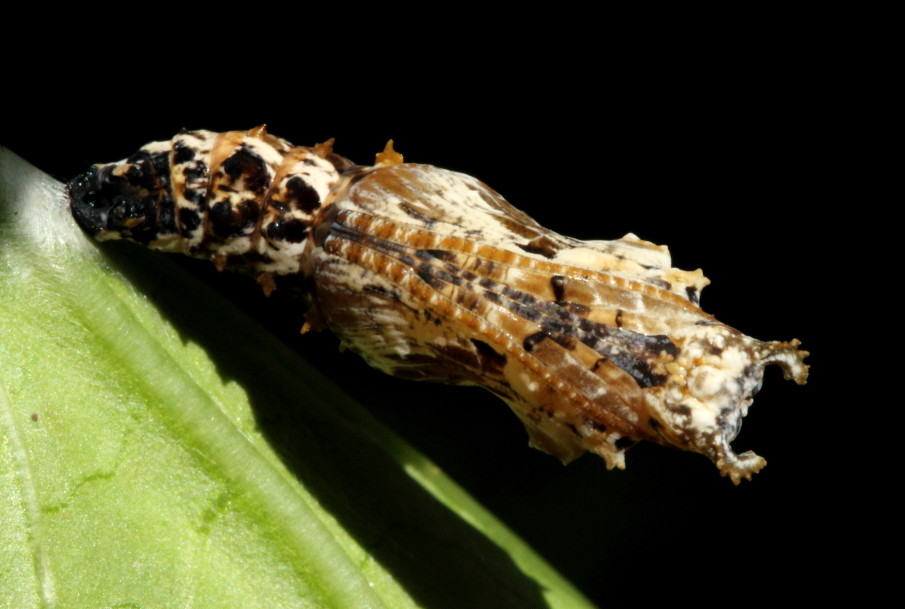
Chrysalis

==== Genus: Cirrochroa (yeomen) ====
===== Cirrochroa thais (Tamil yeoman) =====
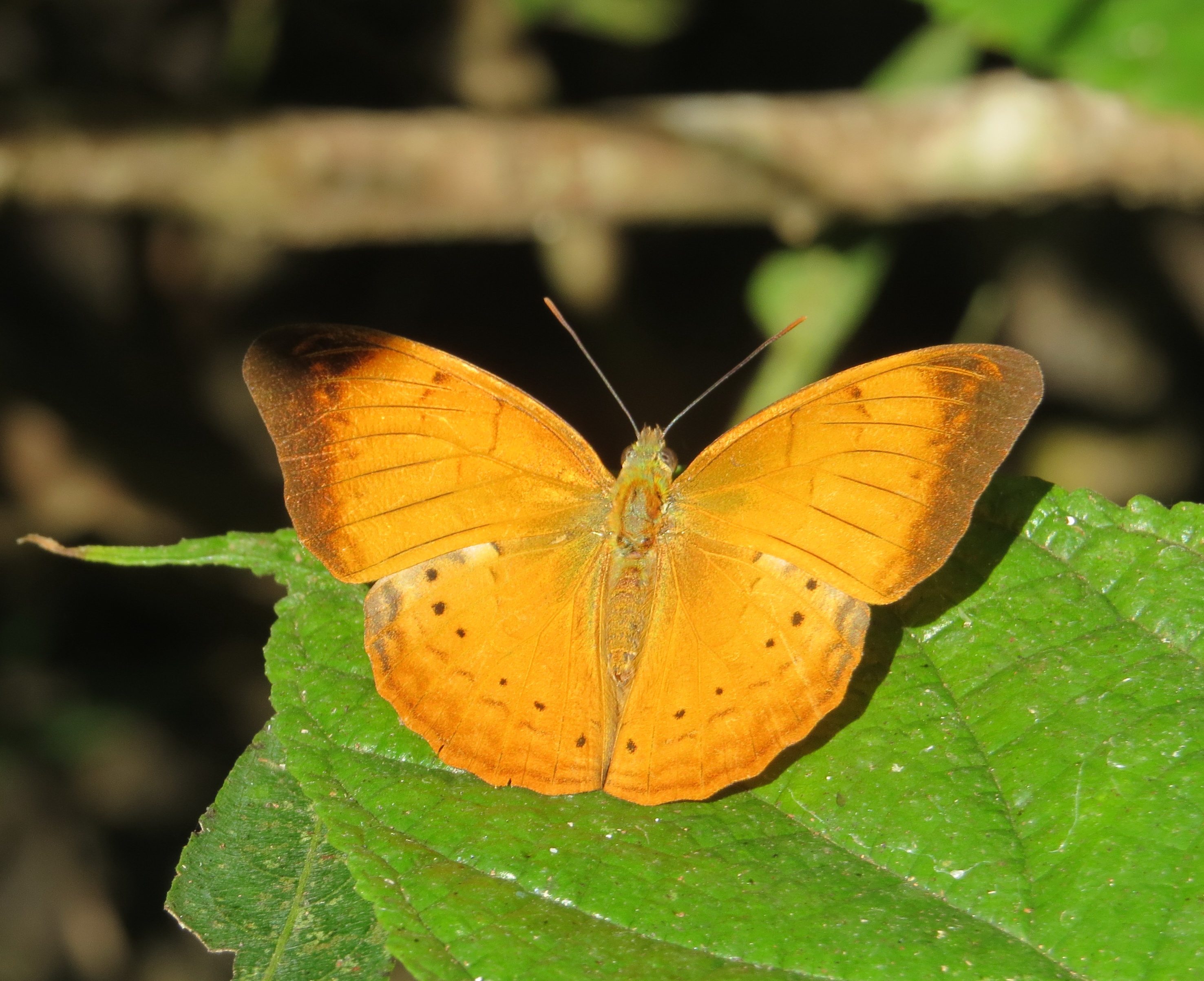
Dorsal view

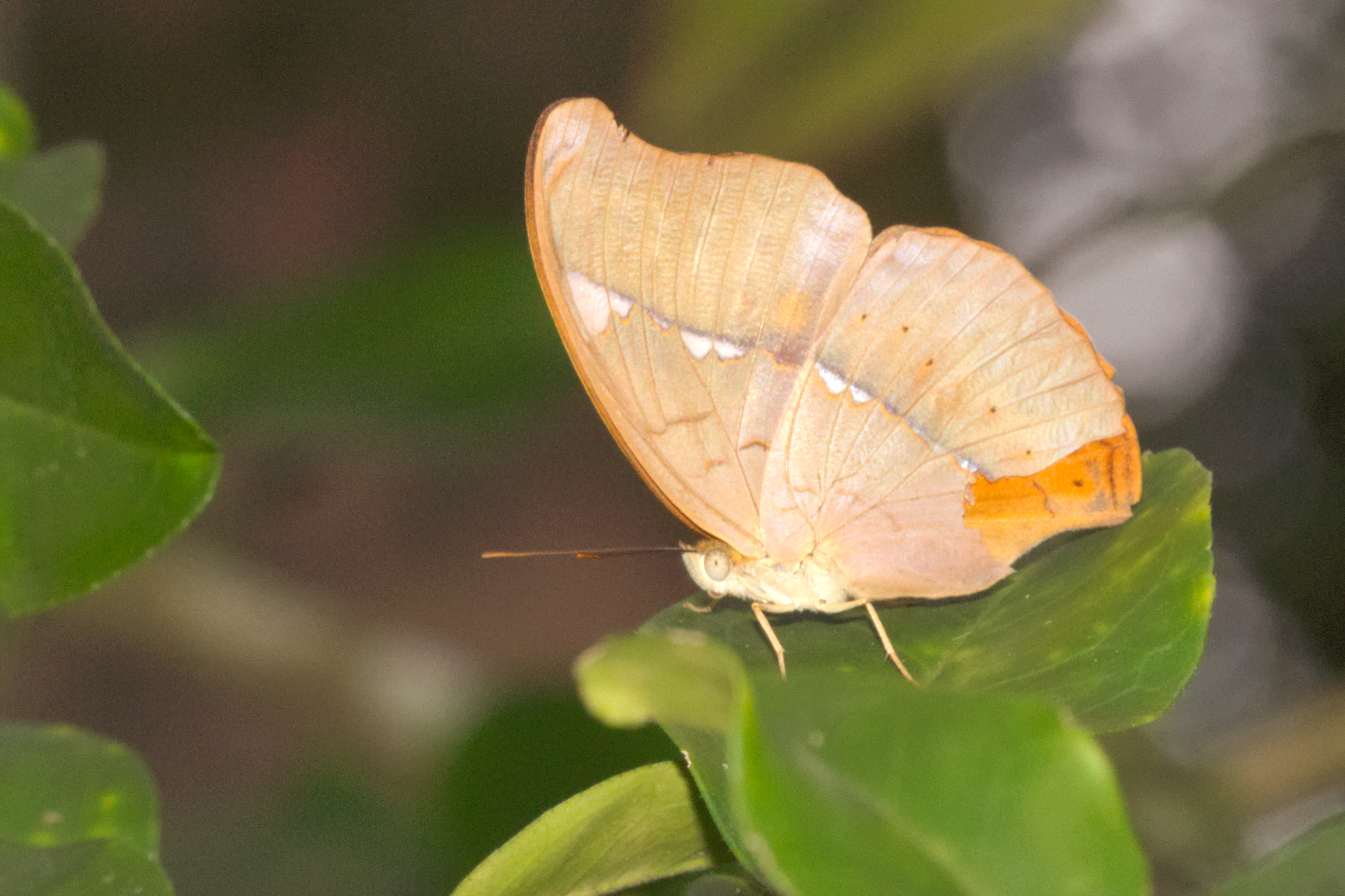
Ventral view

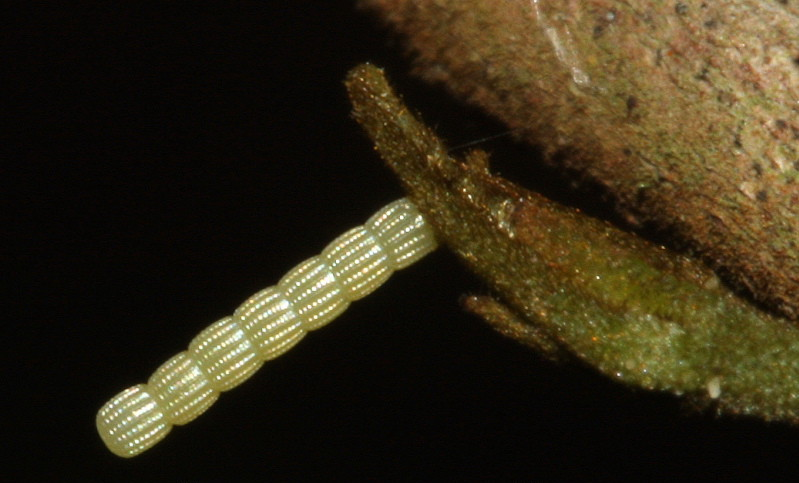
Eggs

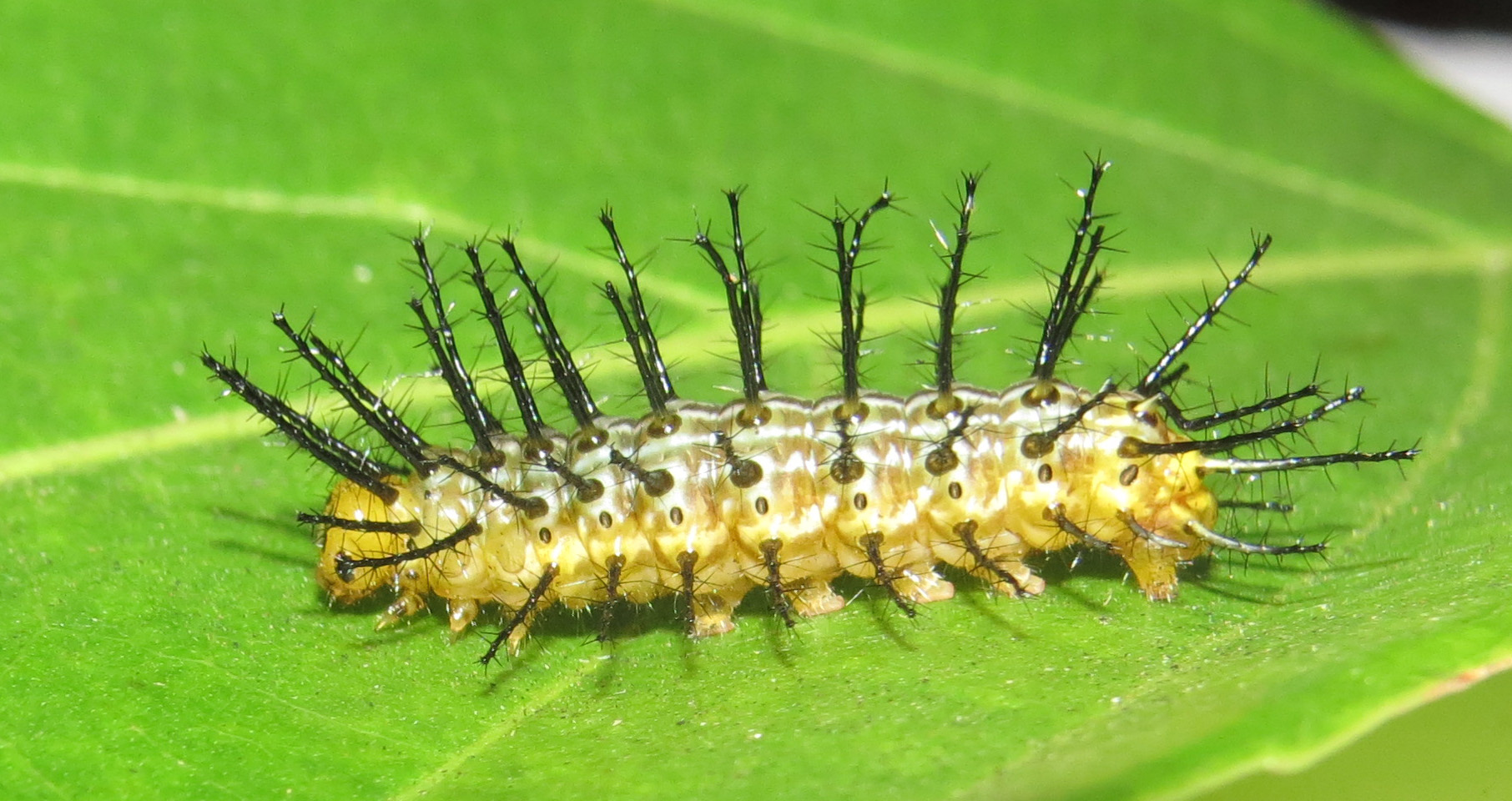
Larva

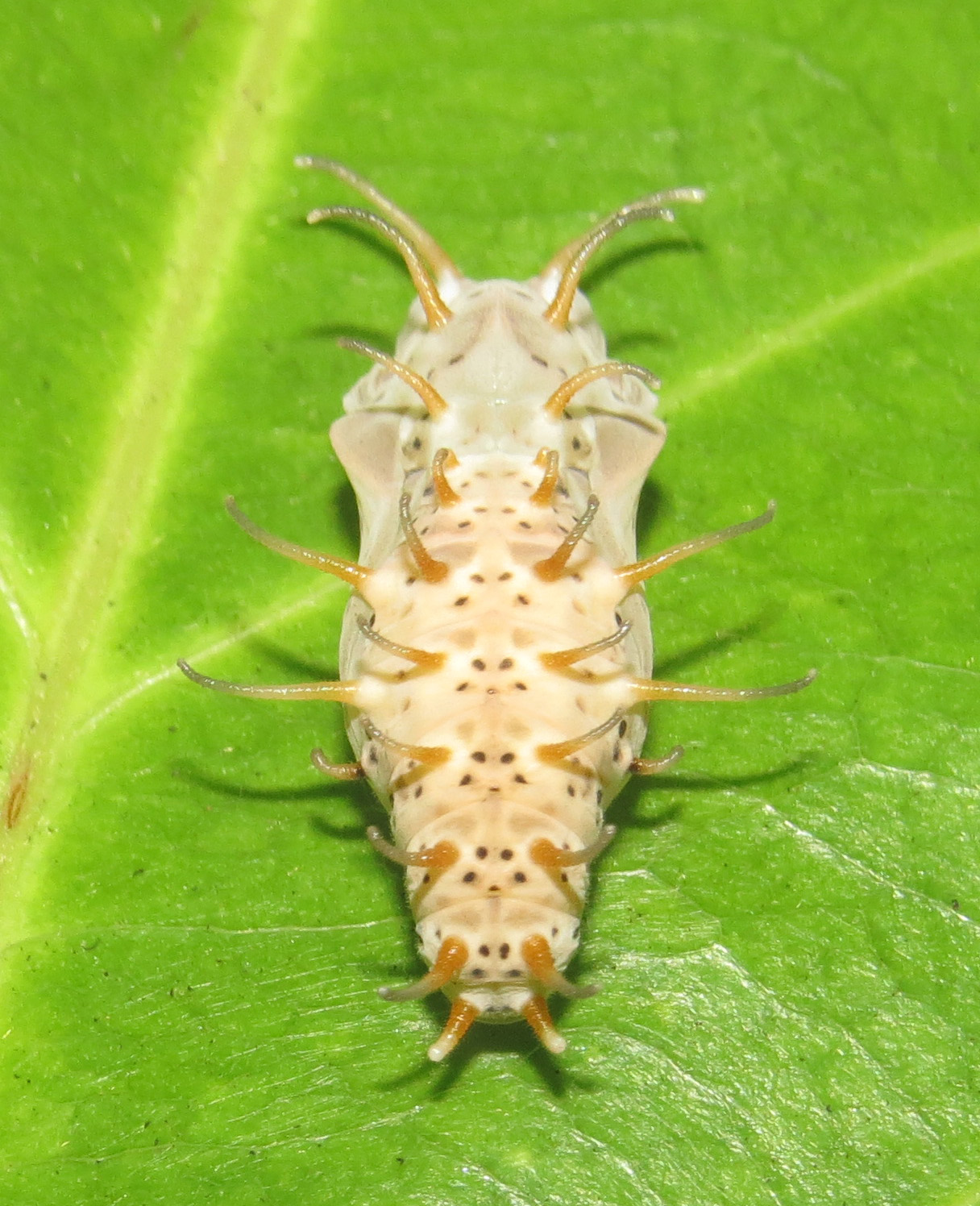
Pupa

==== Genus: Cupha (rustics) ====
===== Cupha erymanthis (rustic) =====
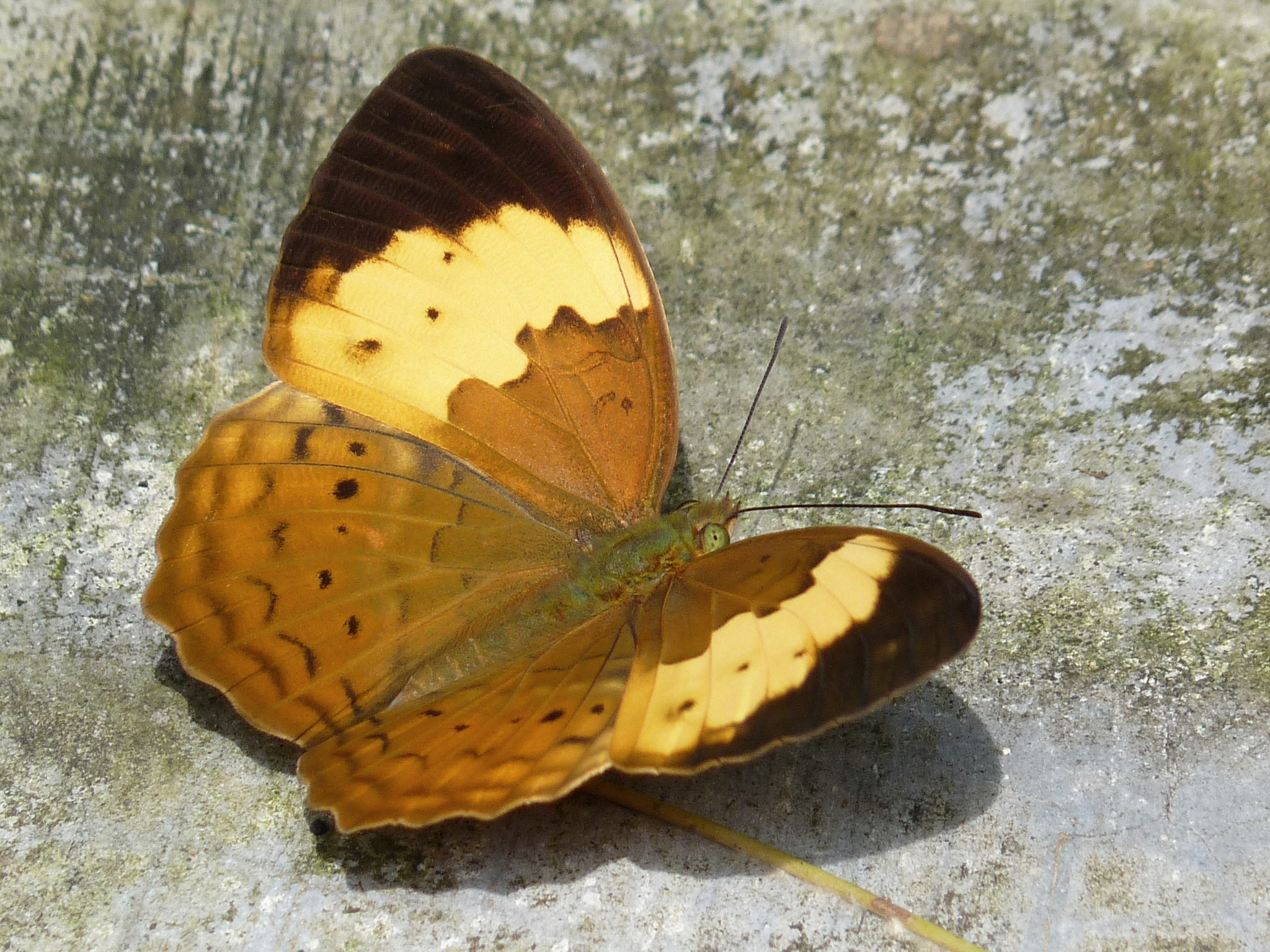
Dorsal view

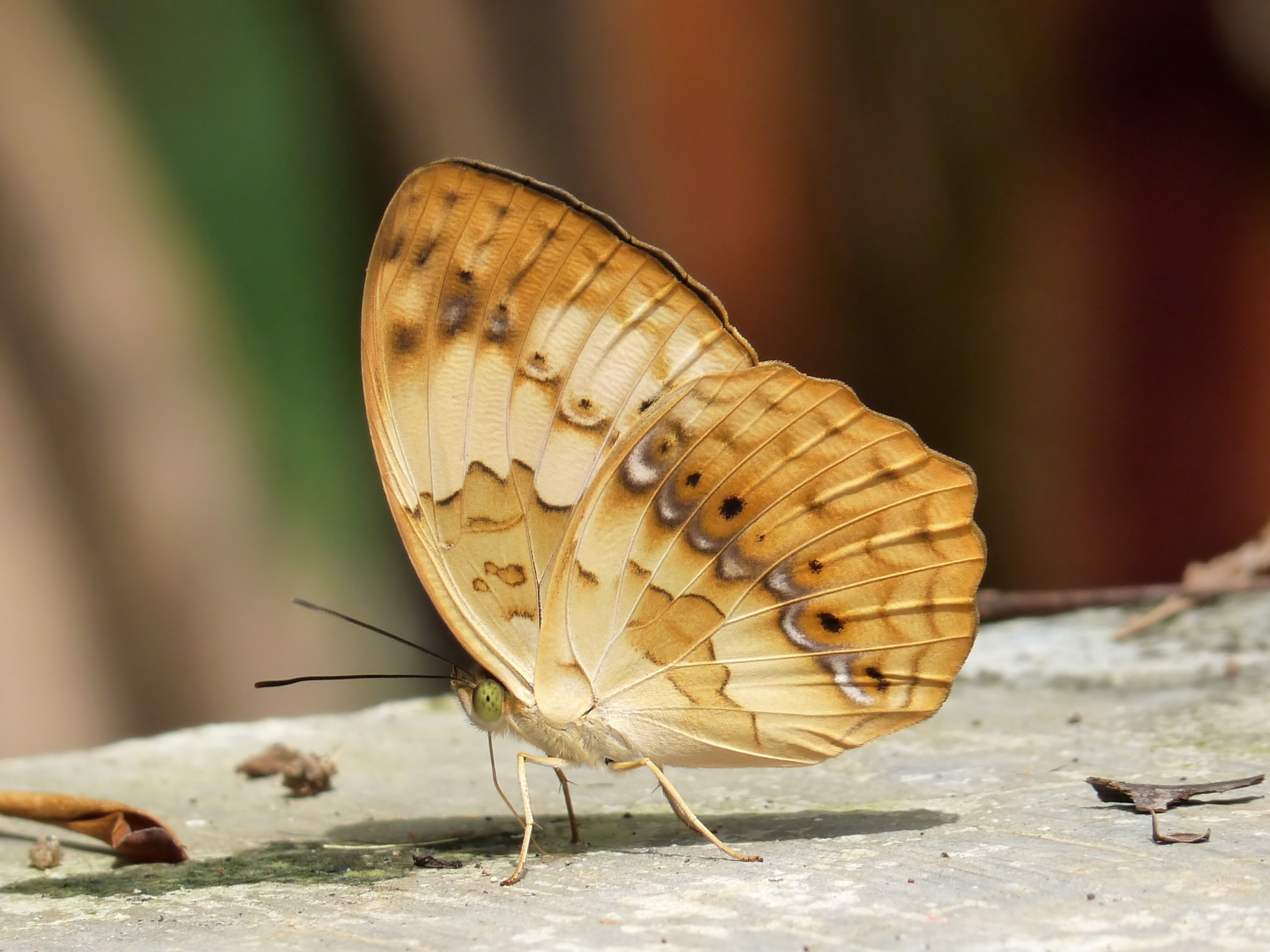
Ventral view

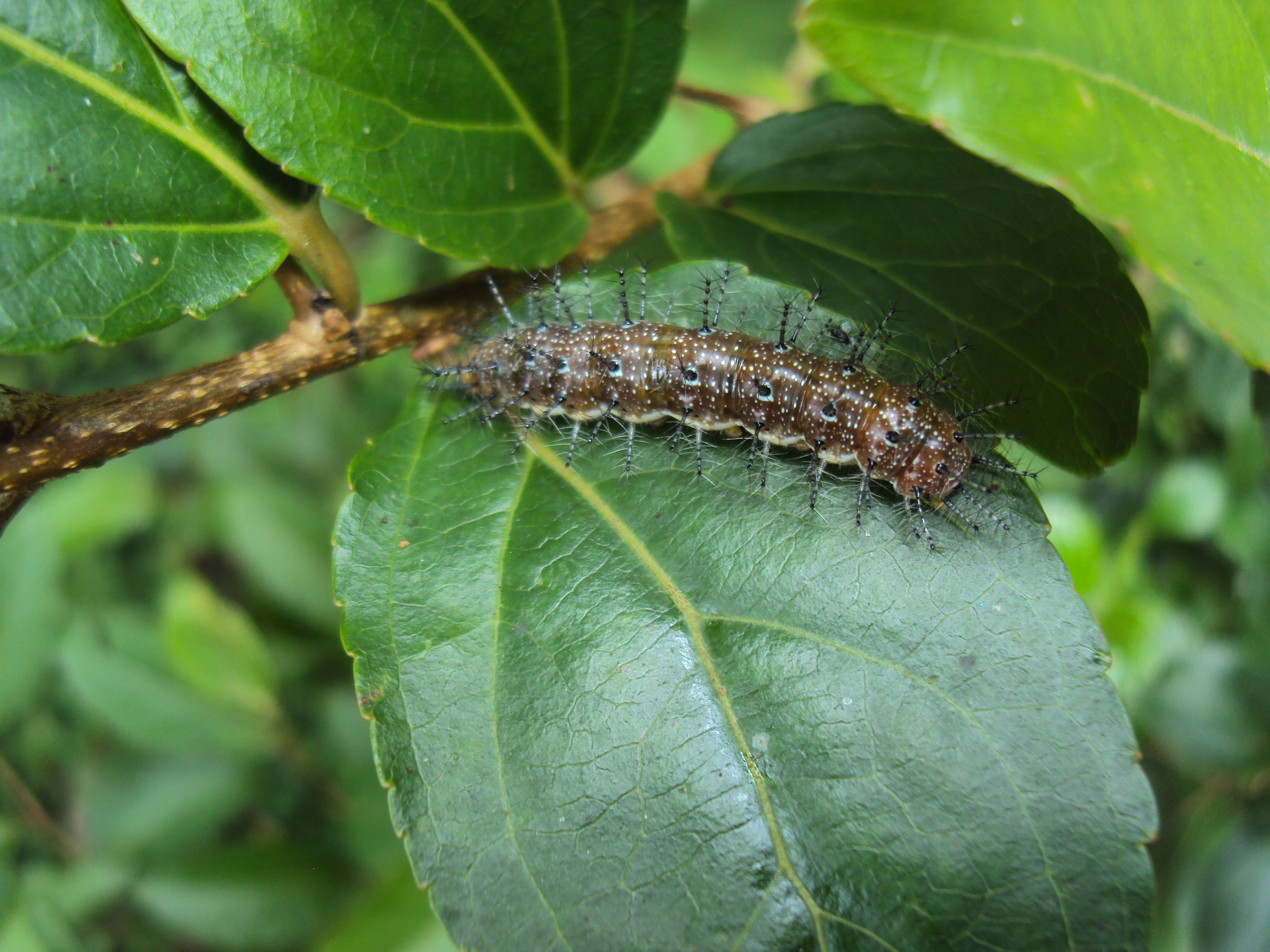
Larva

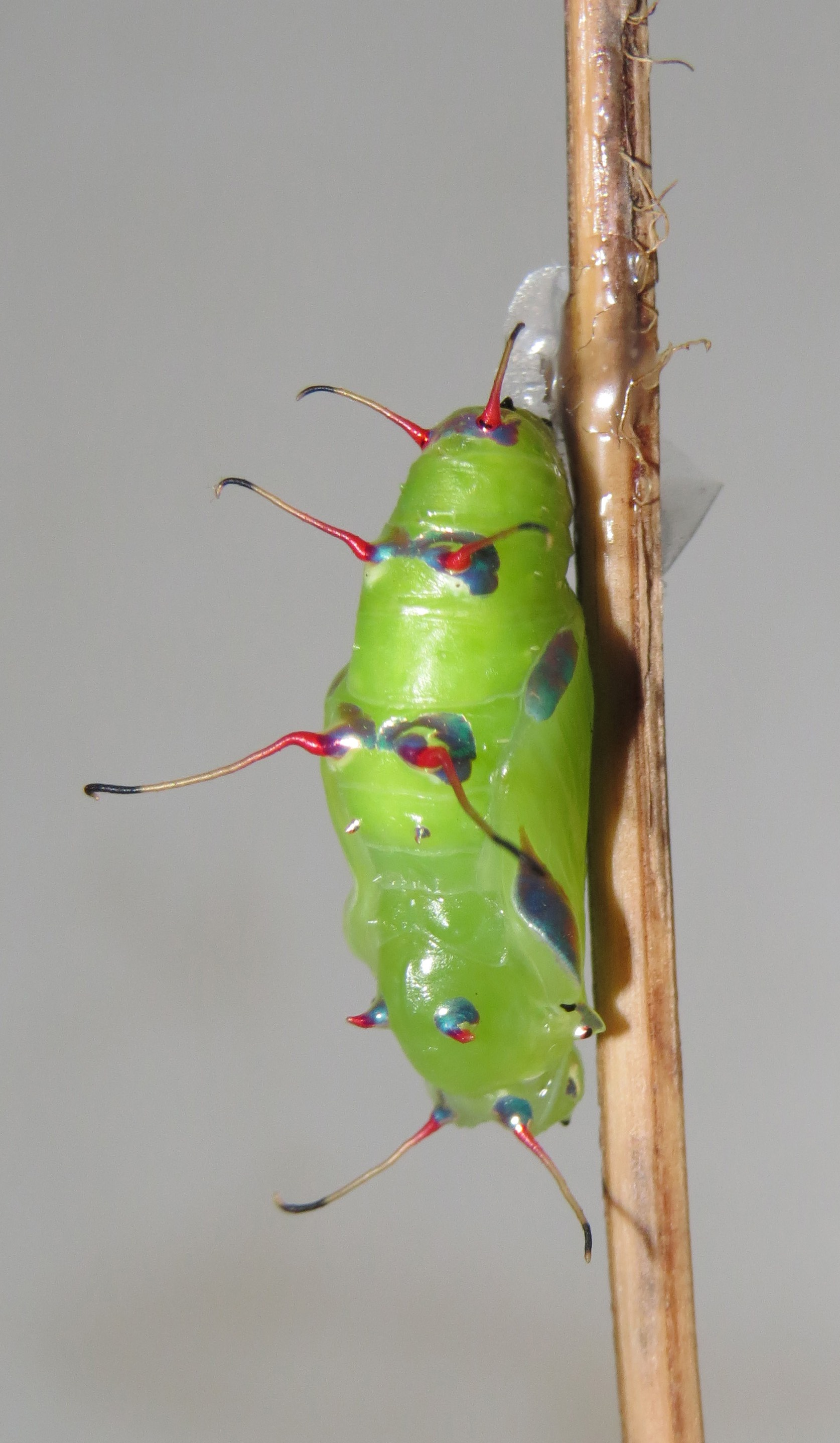
Pupa

==== Genus: Phalanta (leopards) ====
===== Phalanta alcippe (small leopard) =====
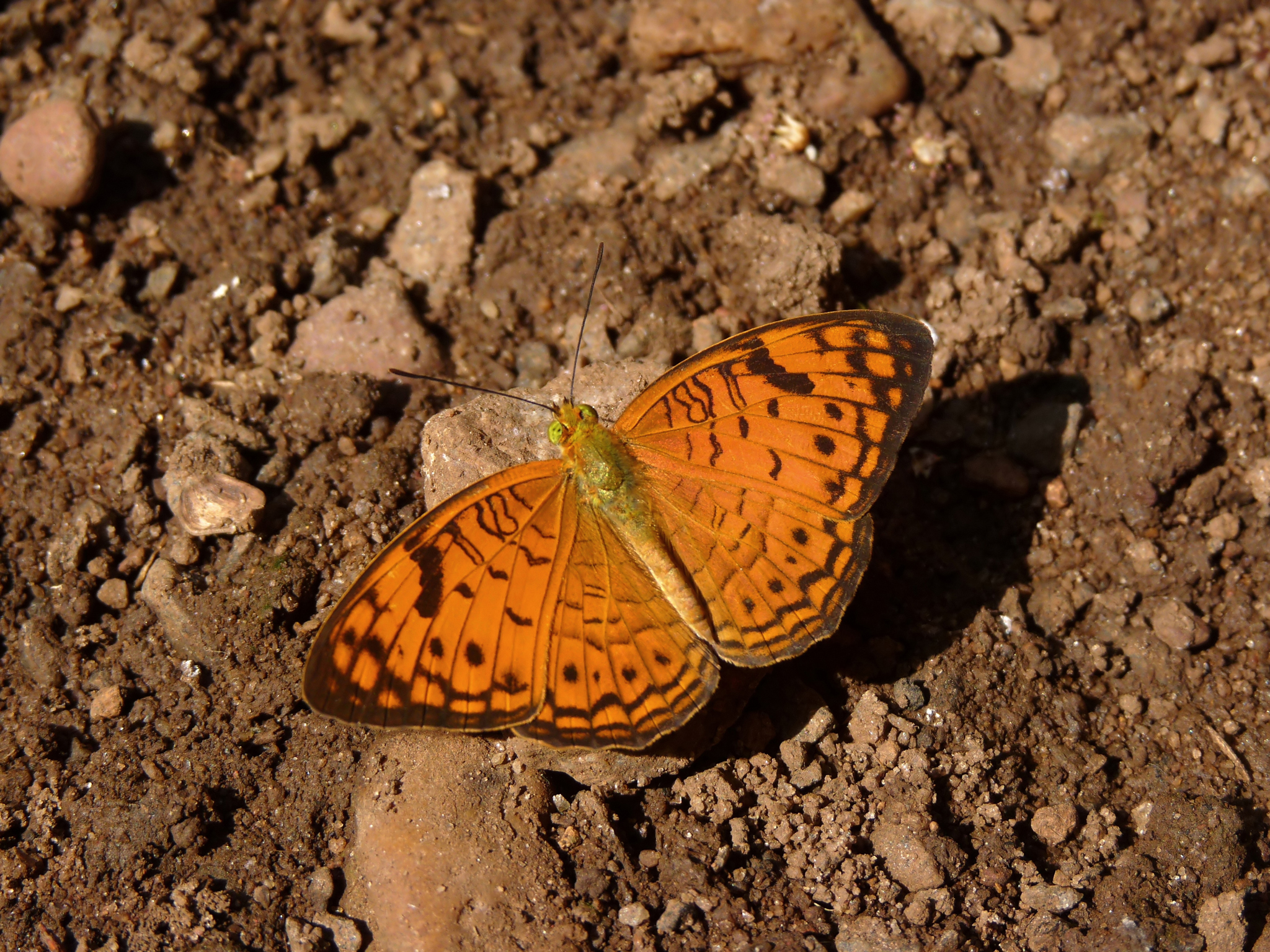
Dorsal view

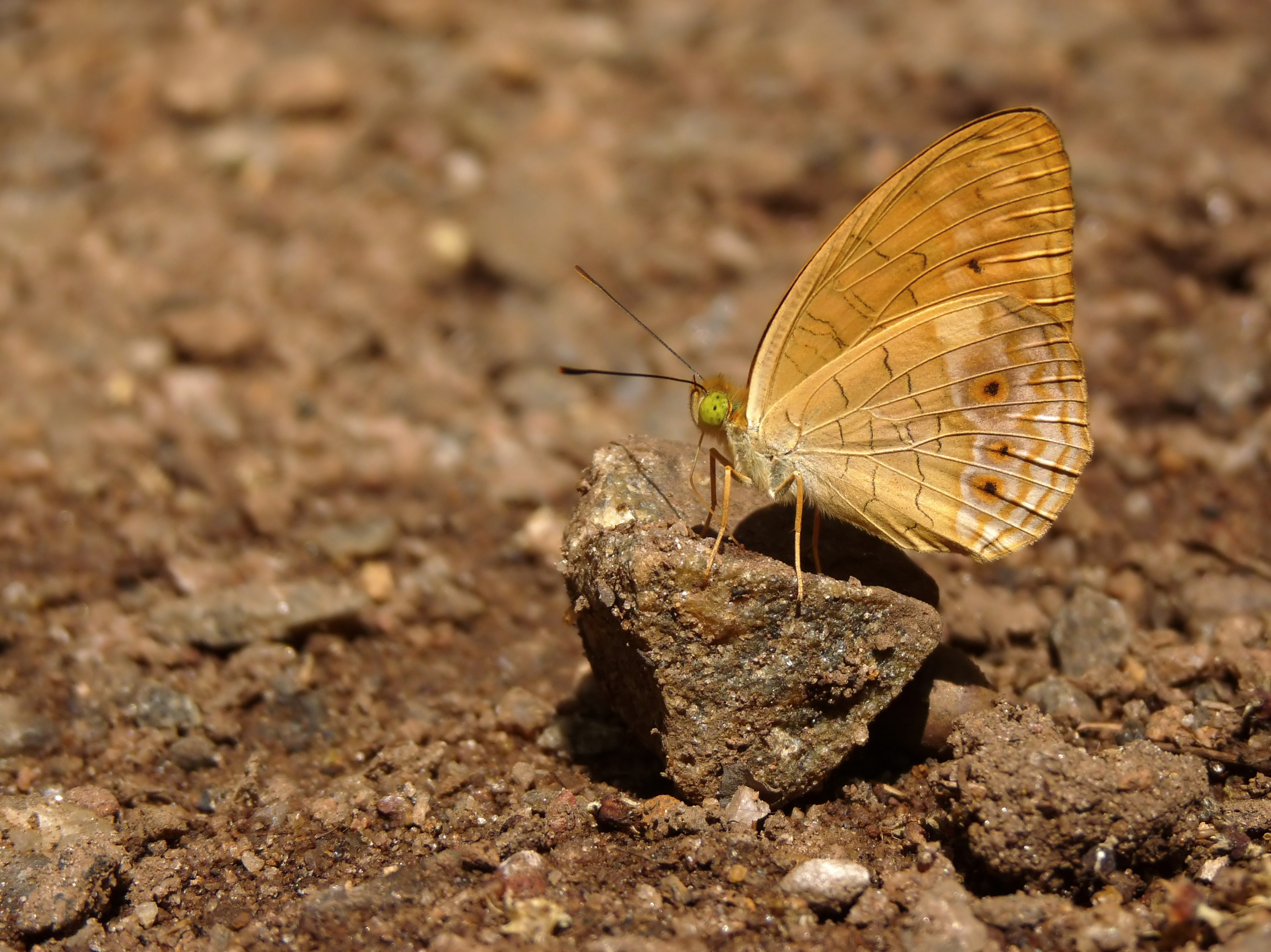
Ventral view

===== Phalanta phalantha (common leopard) =====
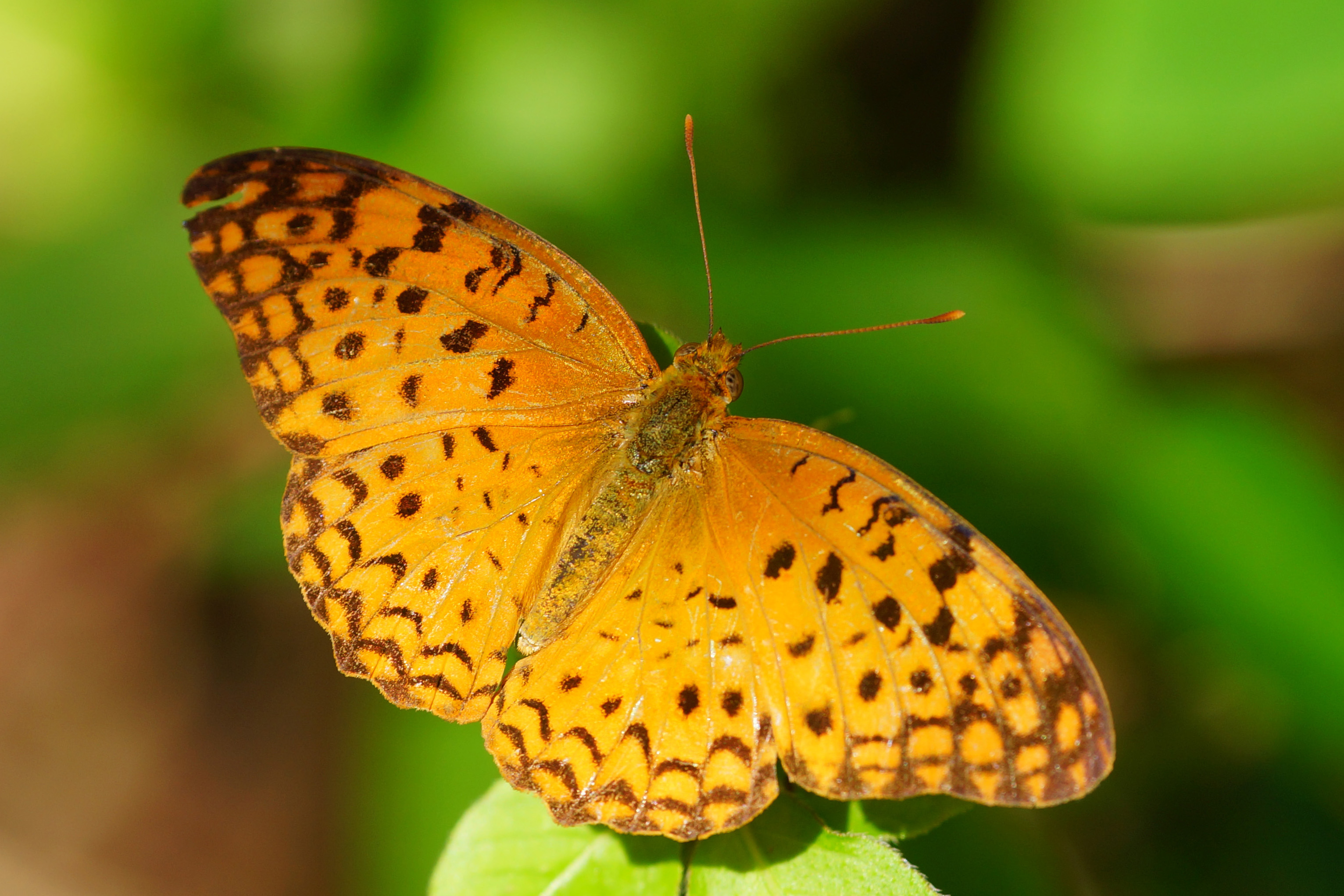
Dorsal view

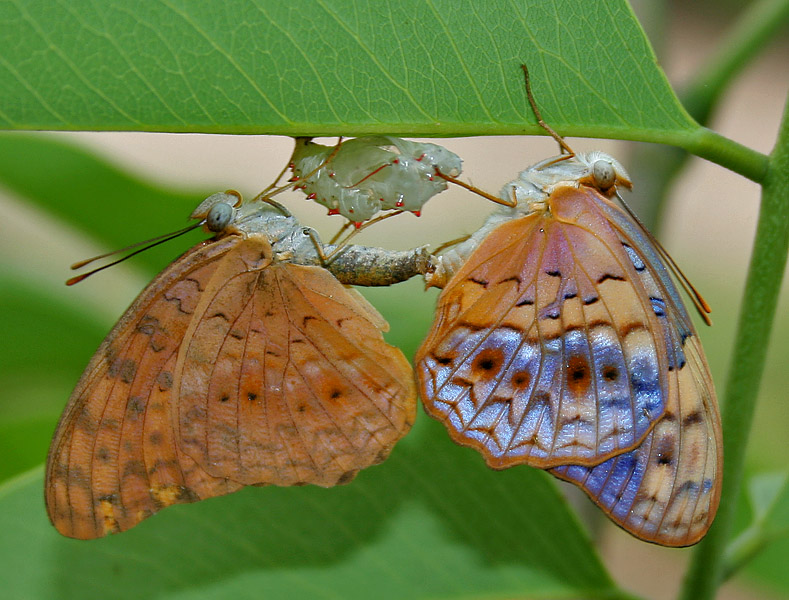
Ventral view

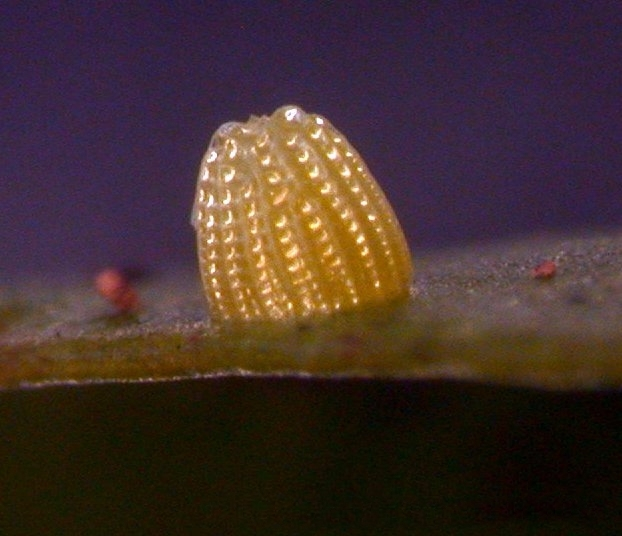
Egg

==== Genus: Vindula (cruisers) ====
===== Vindula erota (cruiser) =====
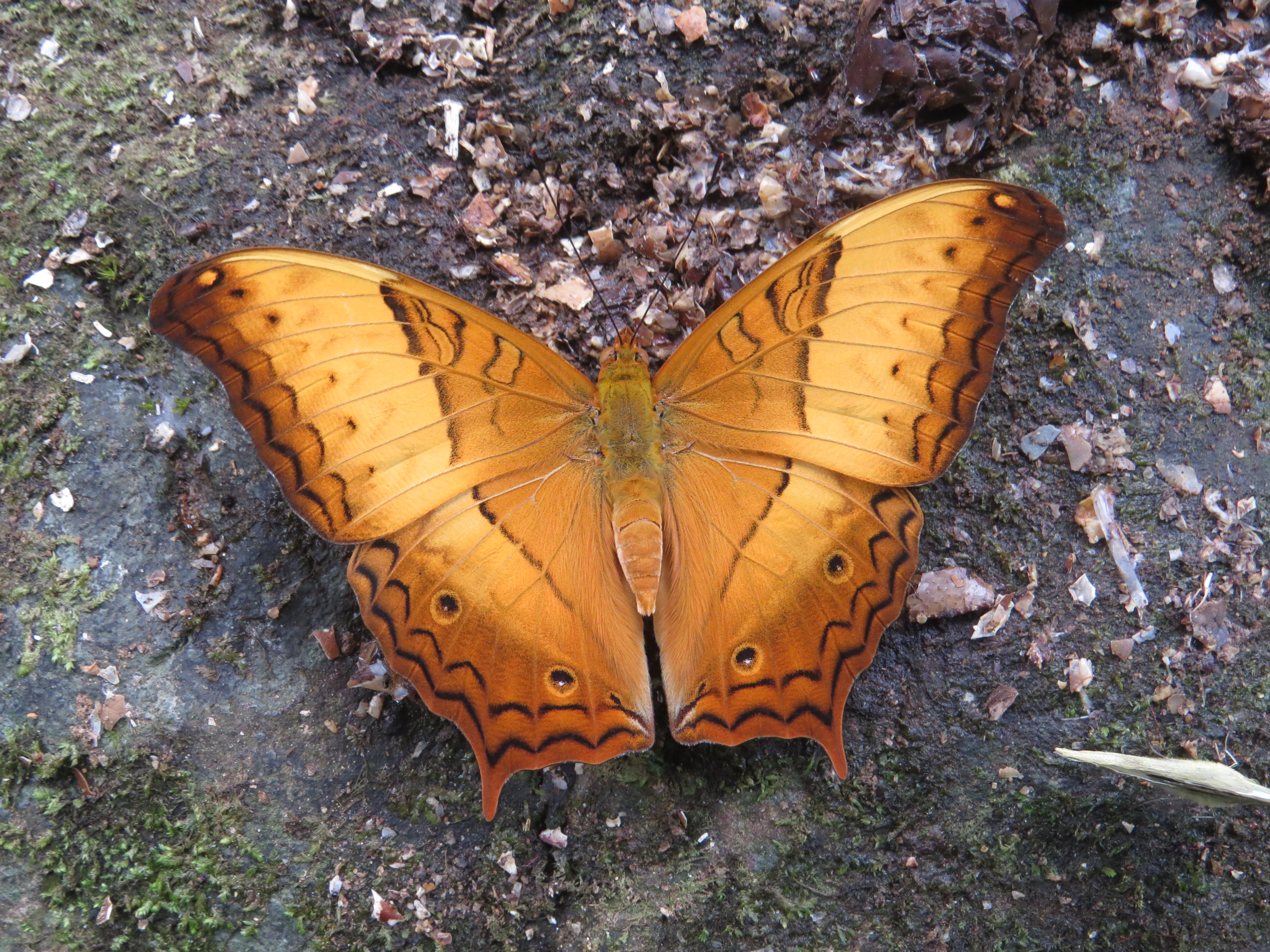
Dorsal view (male)

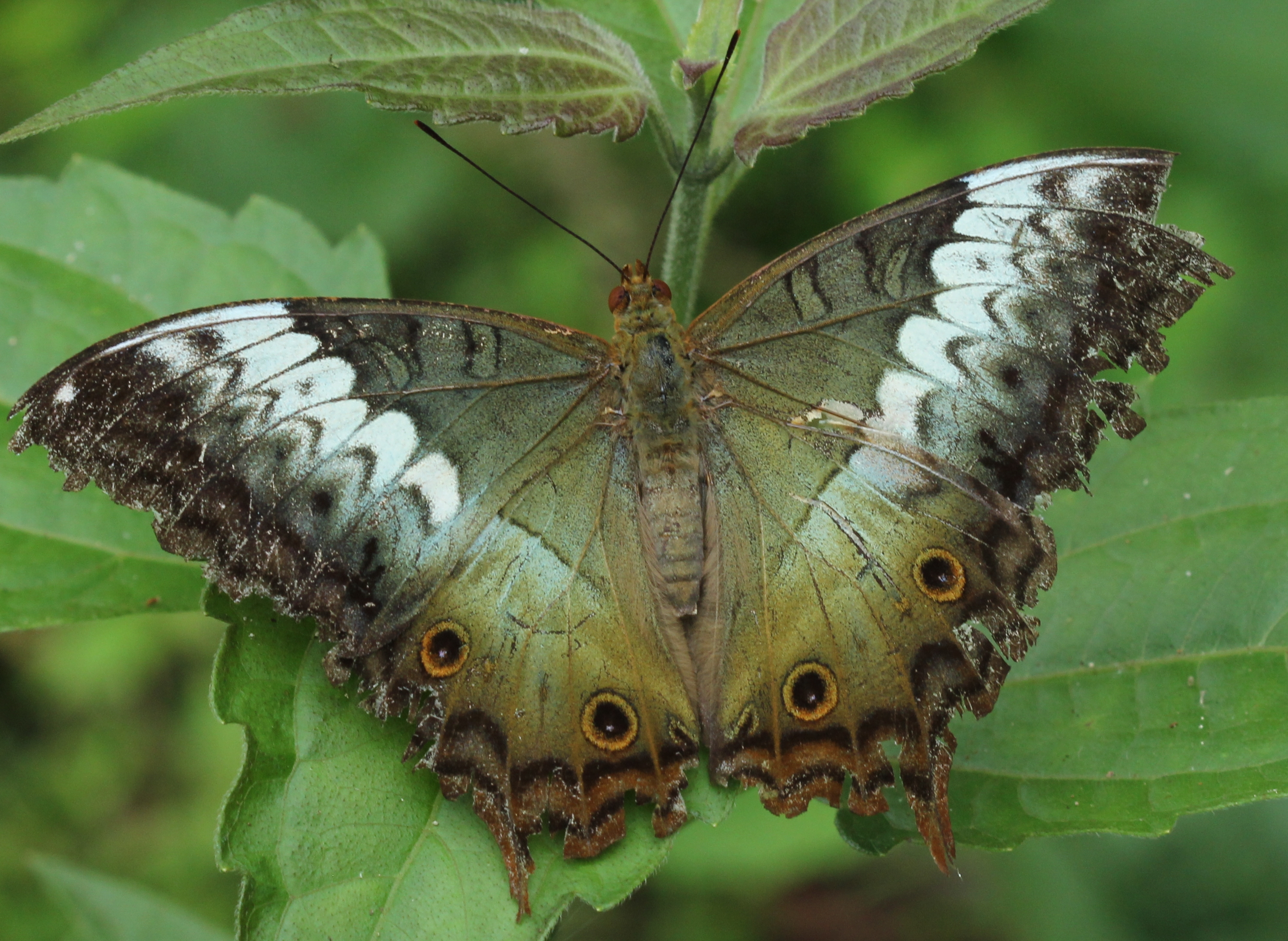
Dorsal view (female)

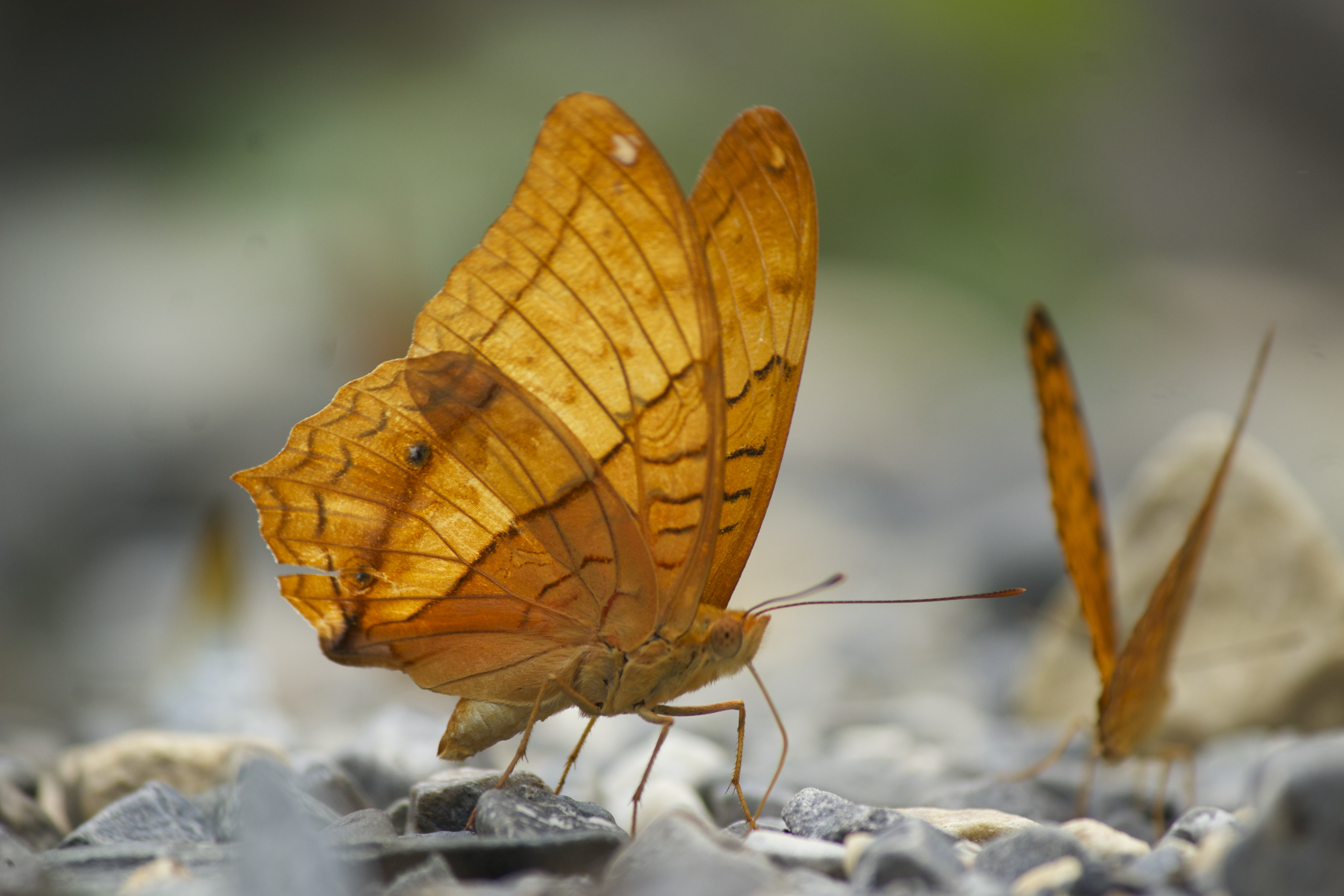
Ventral view

=== Subfamily: Libytheinae ===
==== Genus: Libythea (beaks) ====
===== Libythea laius (lobed beak) =====
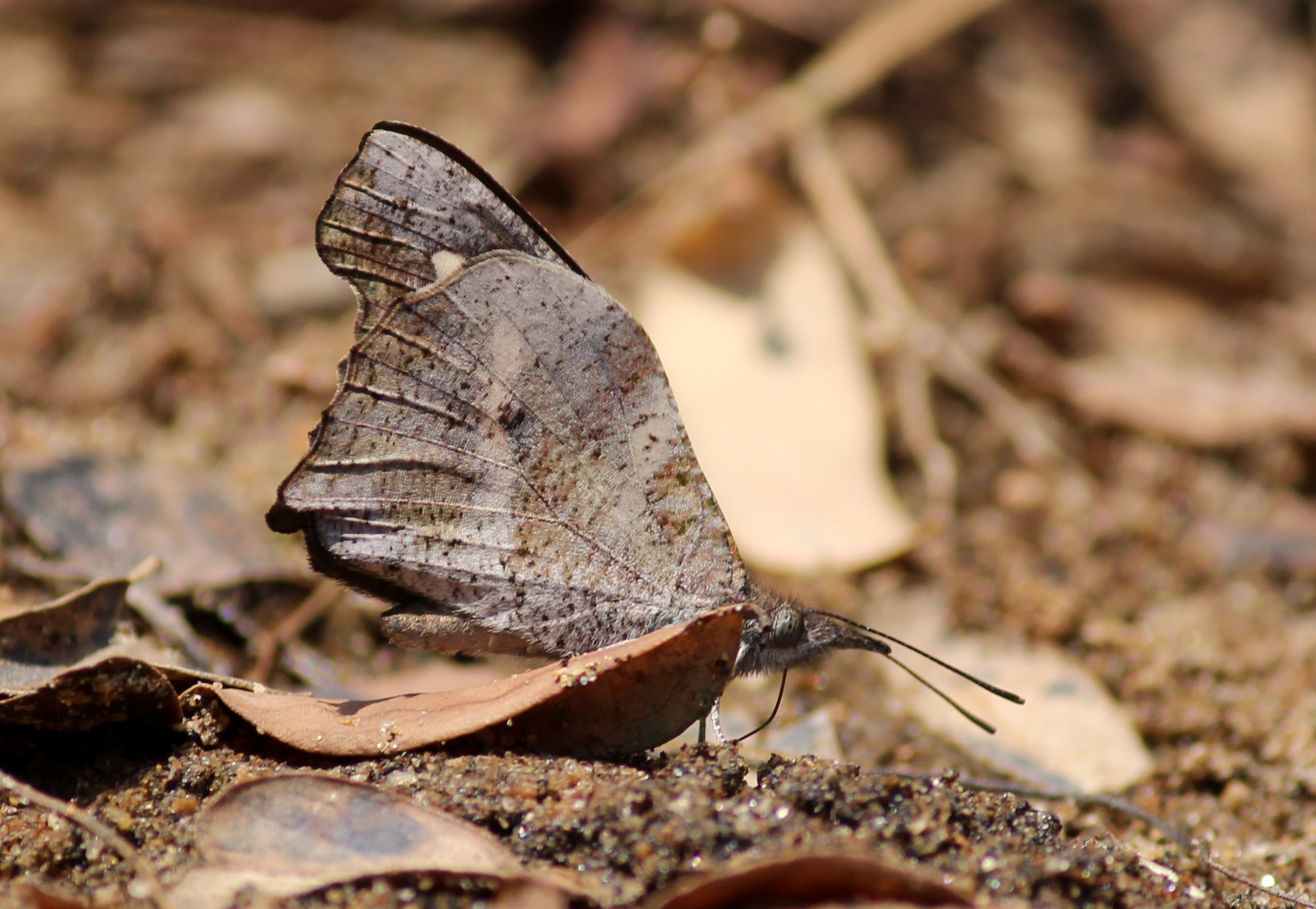

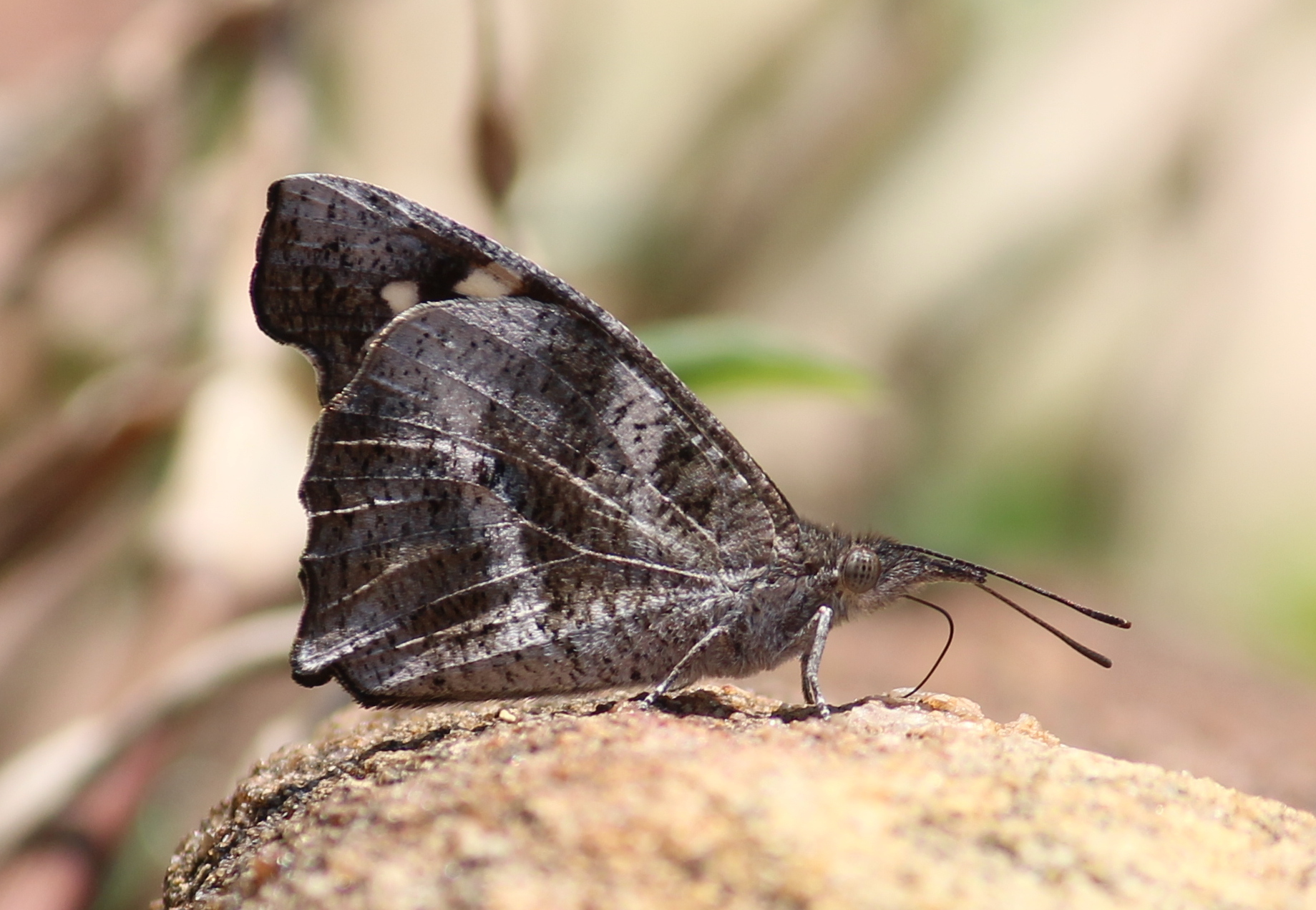

===== Libythea myrrha (club beak) =====
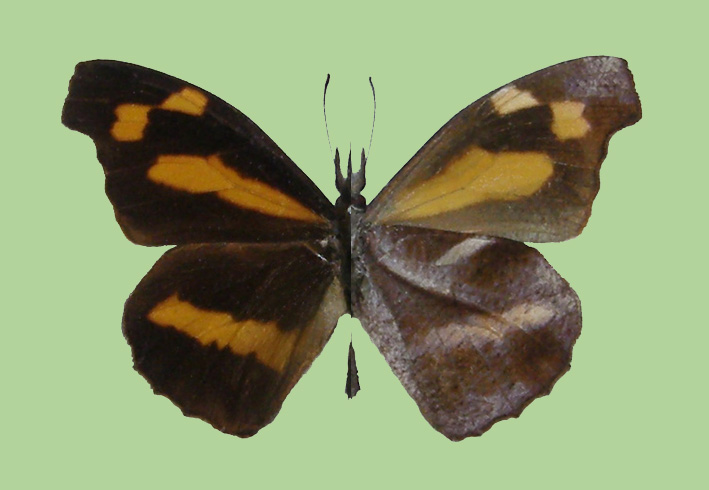
Collected specimen

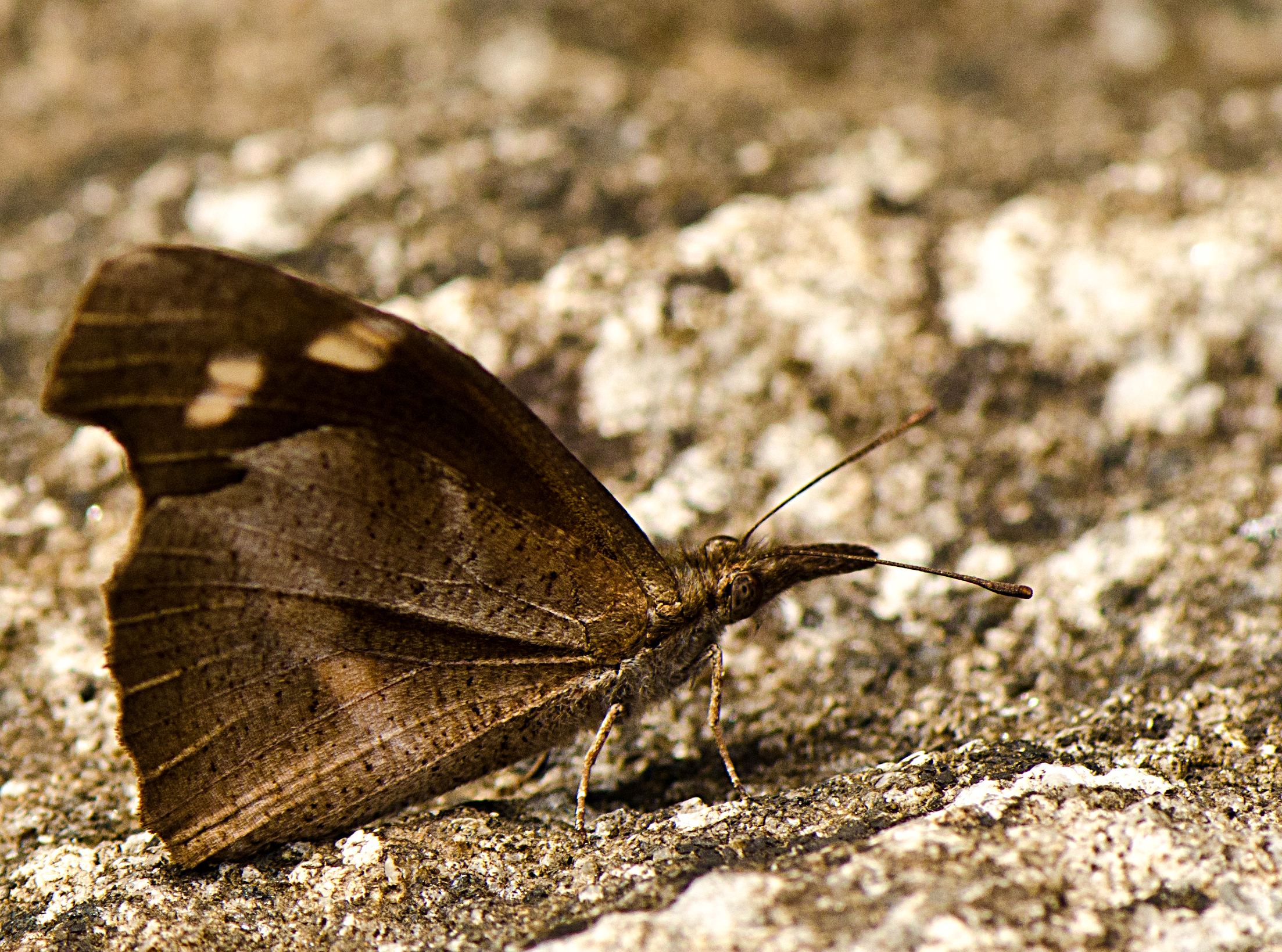
Ventral view

=== Subfamily: Limenitidinae ===
==== Genus: Athyma (sergeants) ====
===== Athyma nefte inara (colour sergeant) =====
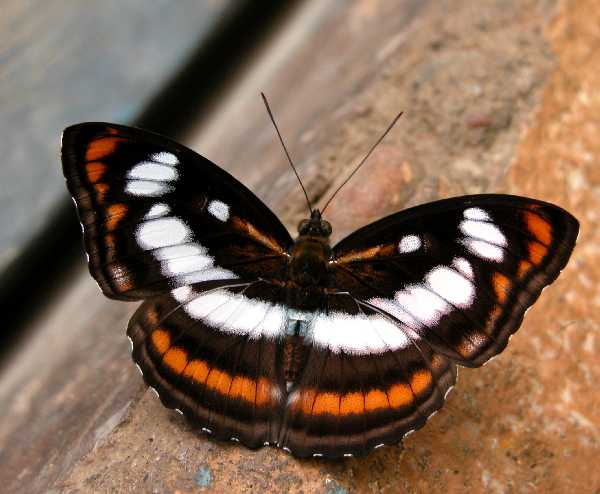
Dorsal view (male)

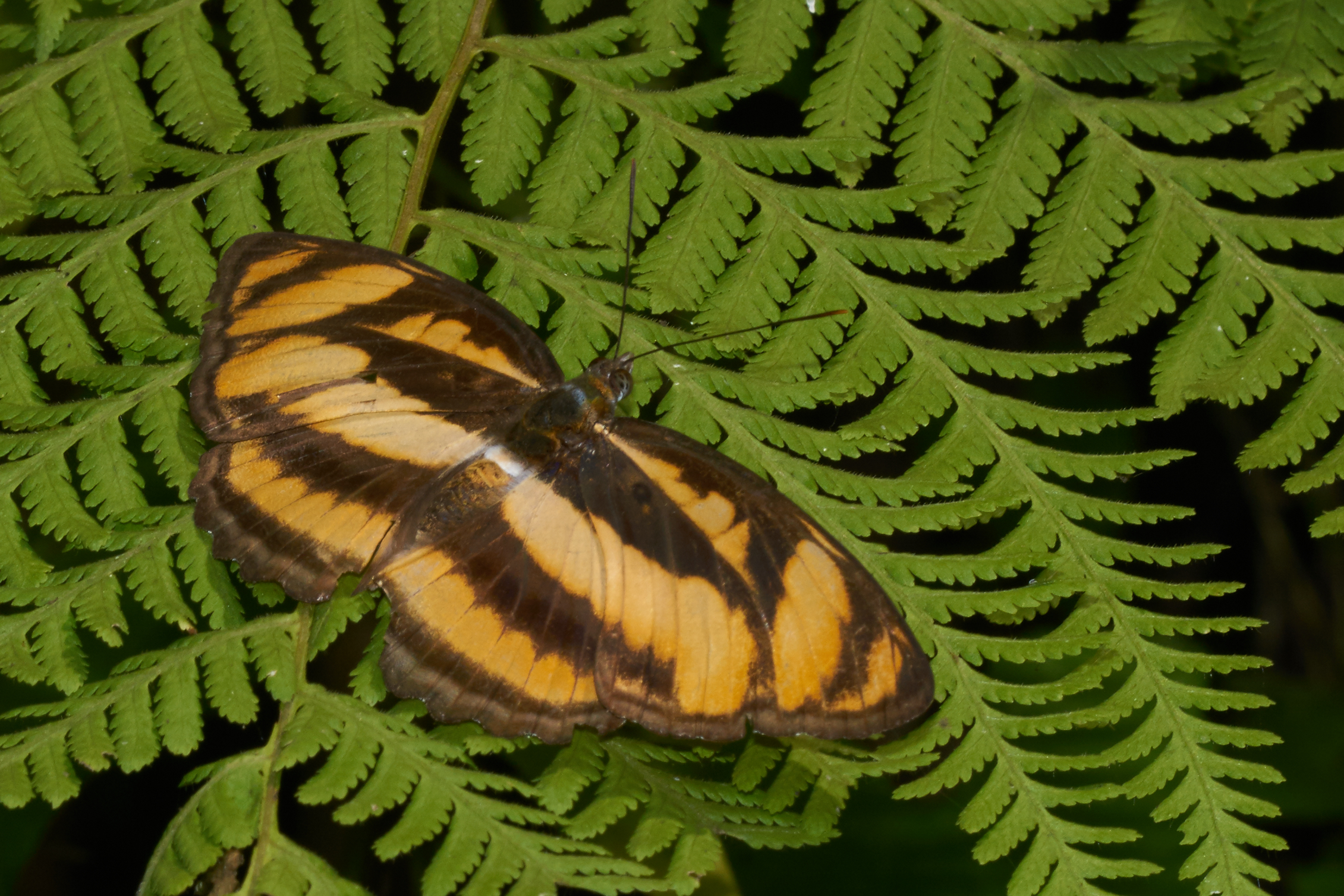
Dorsal view (female)

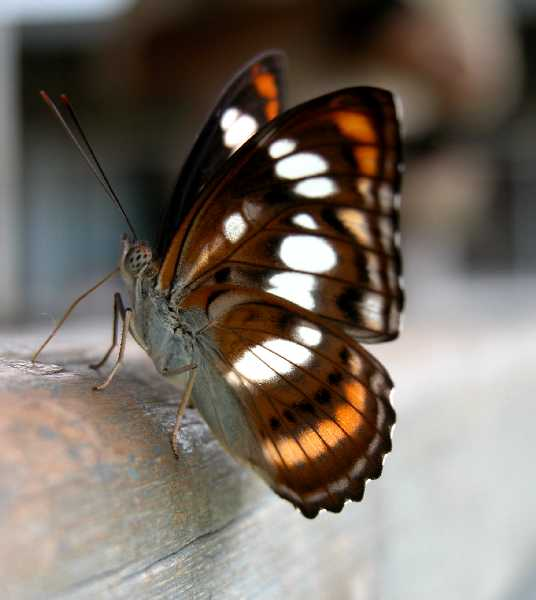
Ventral view

===== Athyma perius (common sergeant) =====
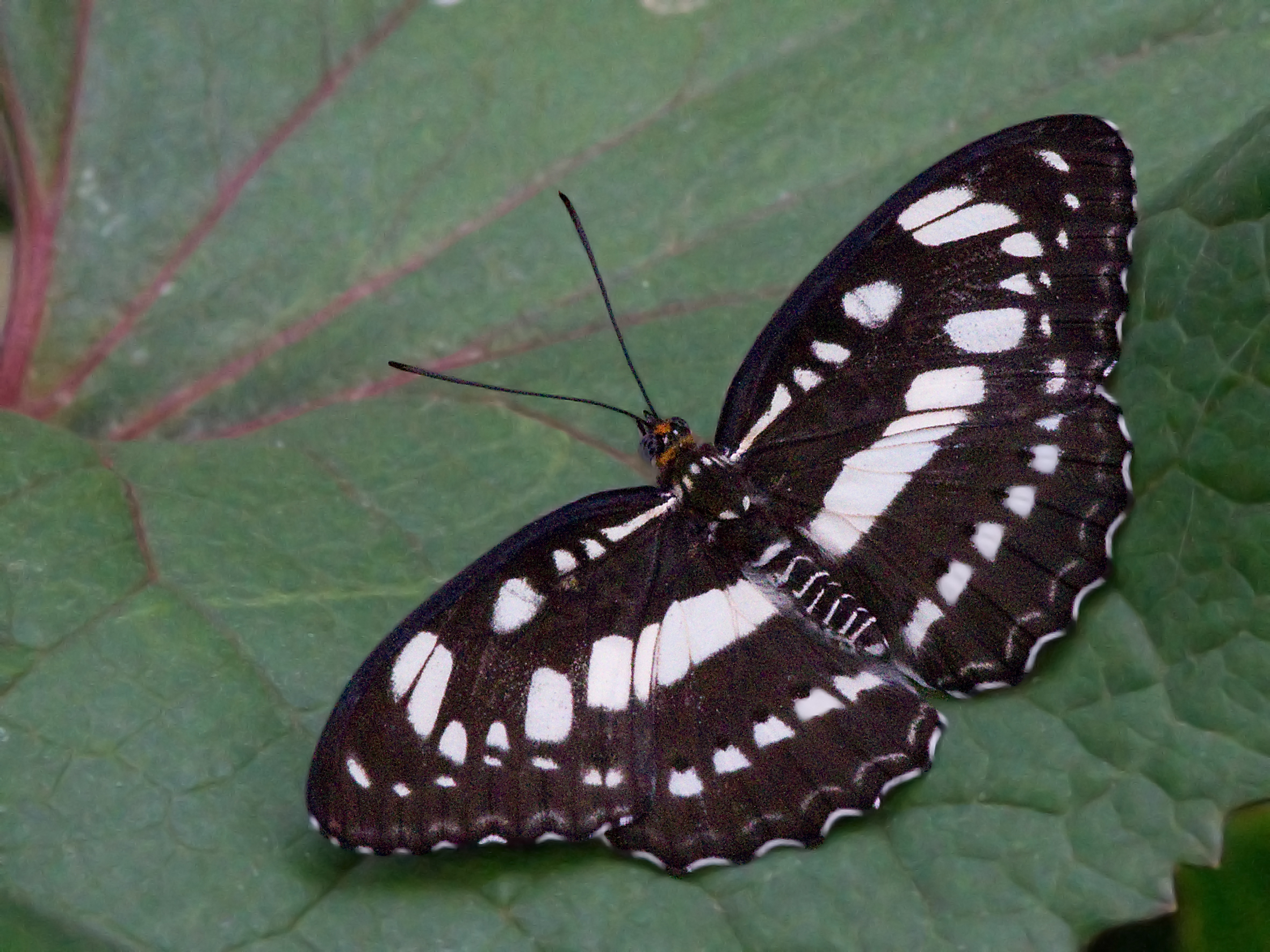
Dorsal view

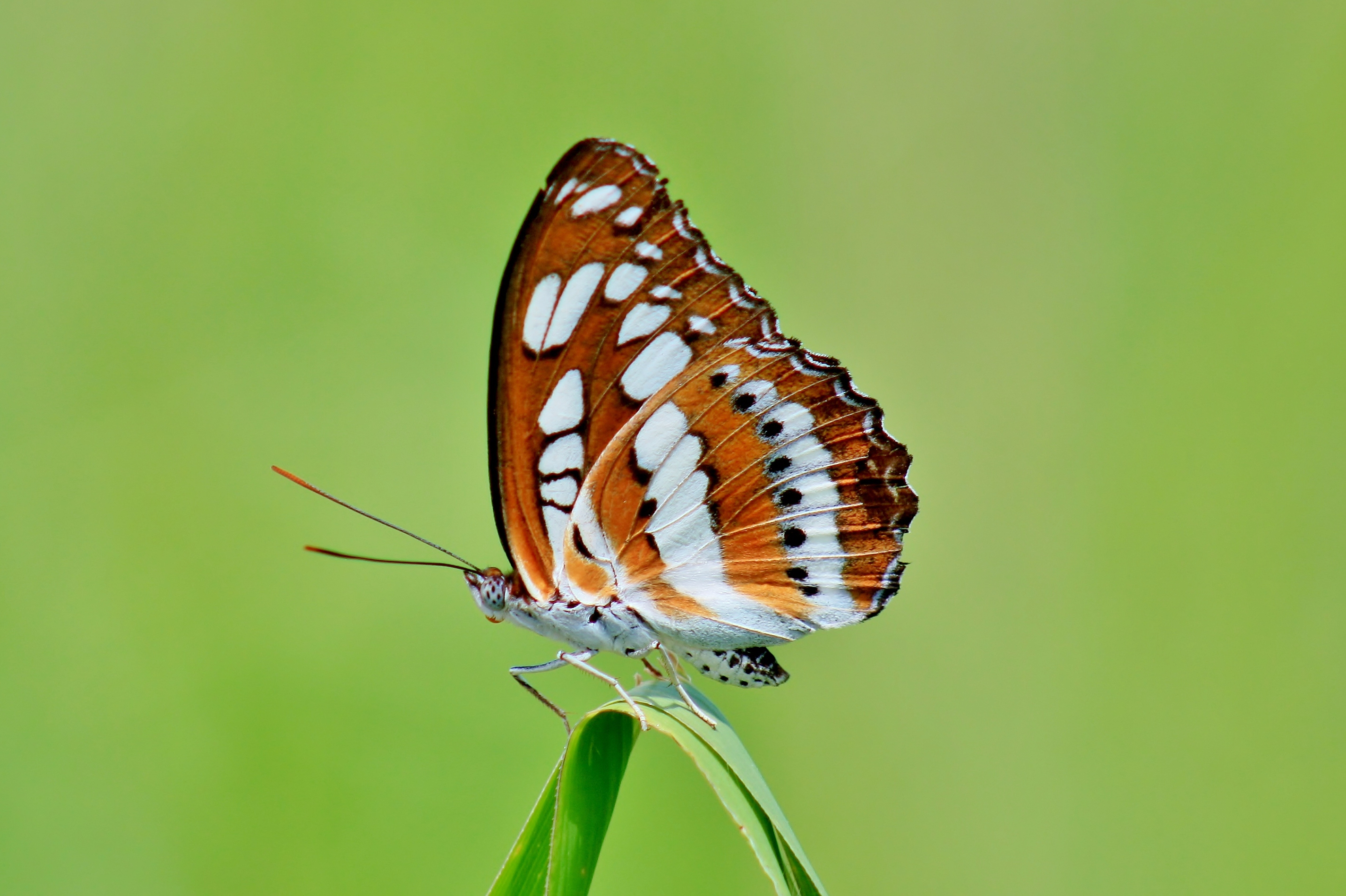
Ventral view

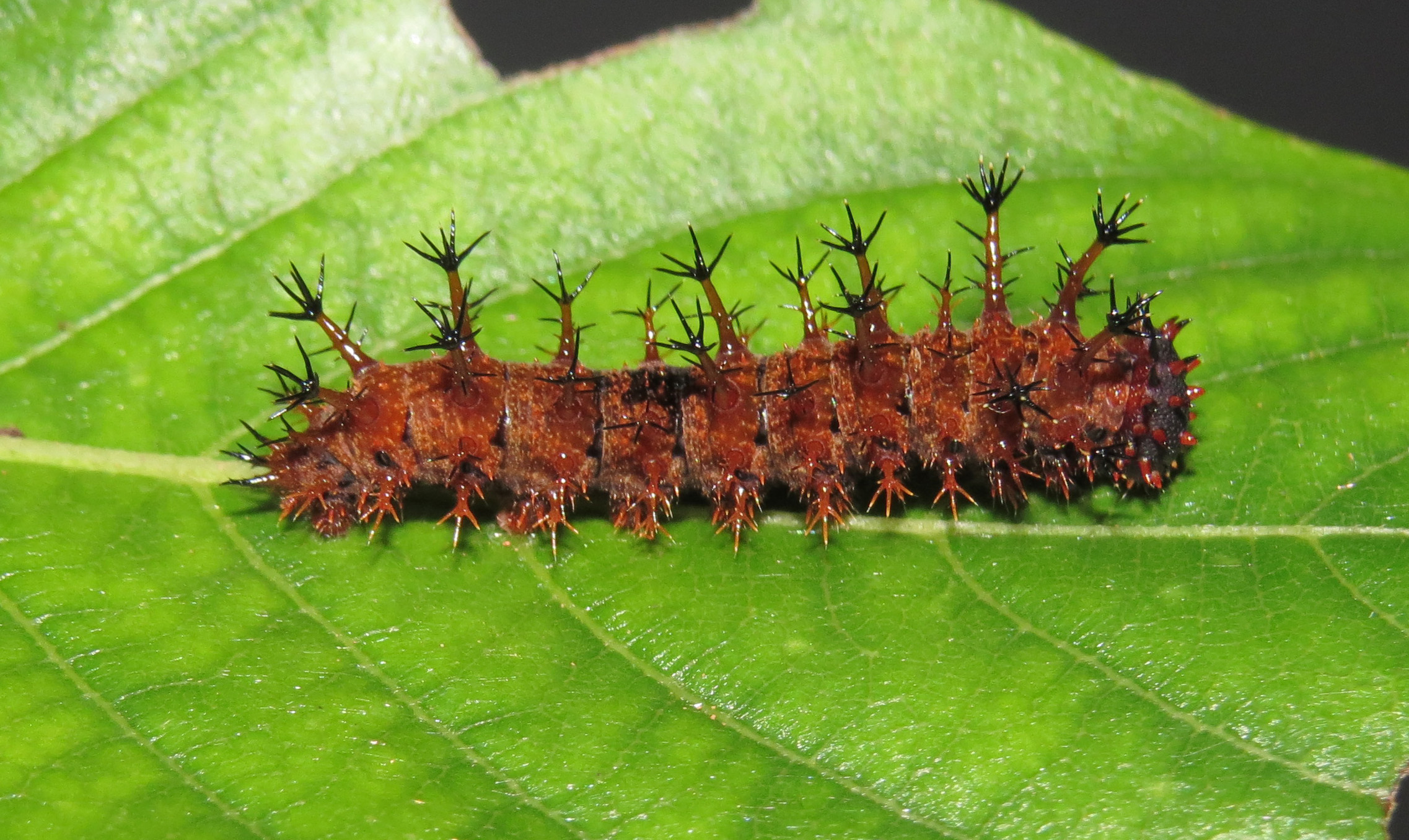
Larva

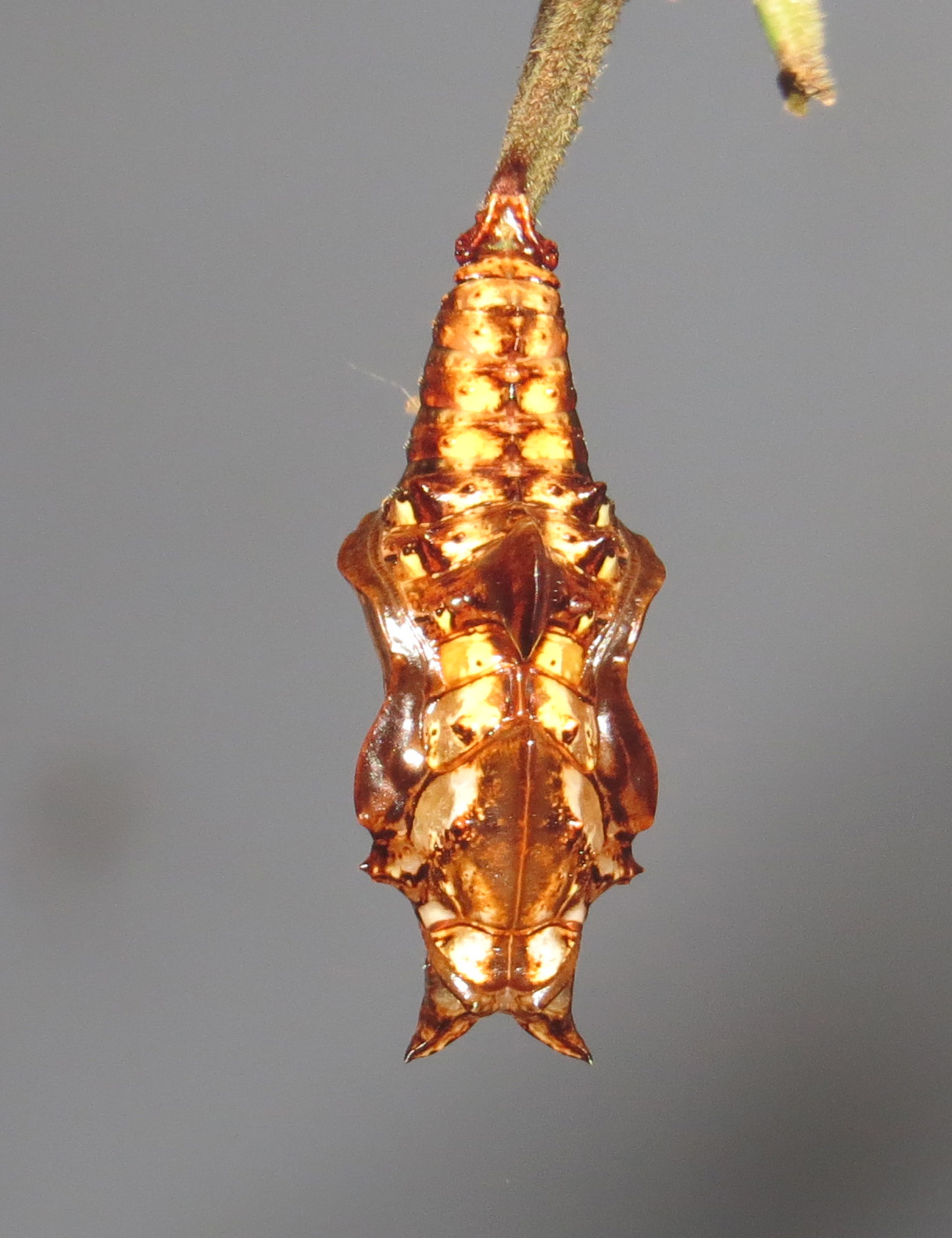
Pupa

===== Athyma ranga (blackvein sergeant) =====
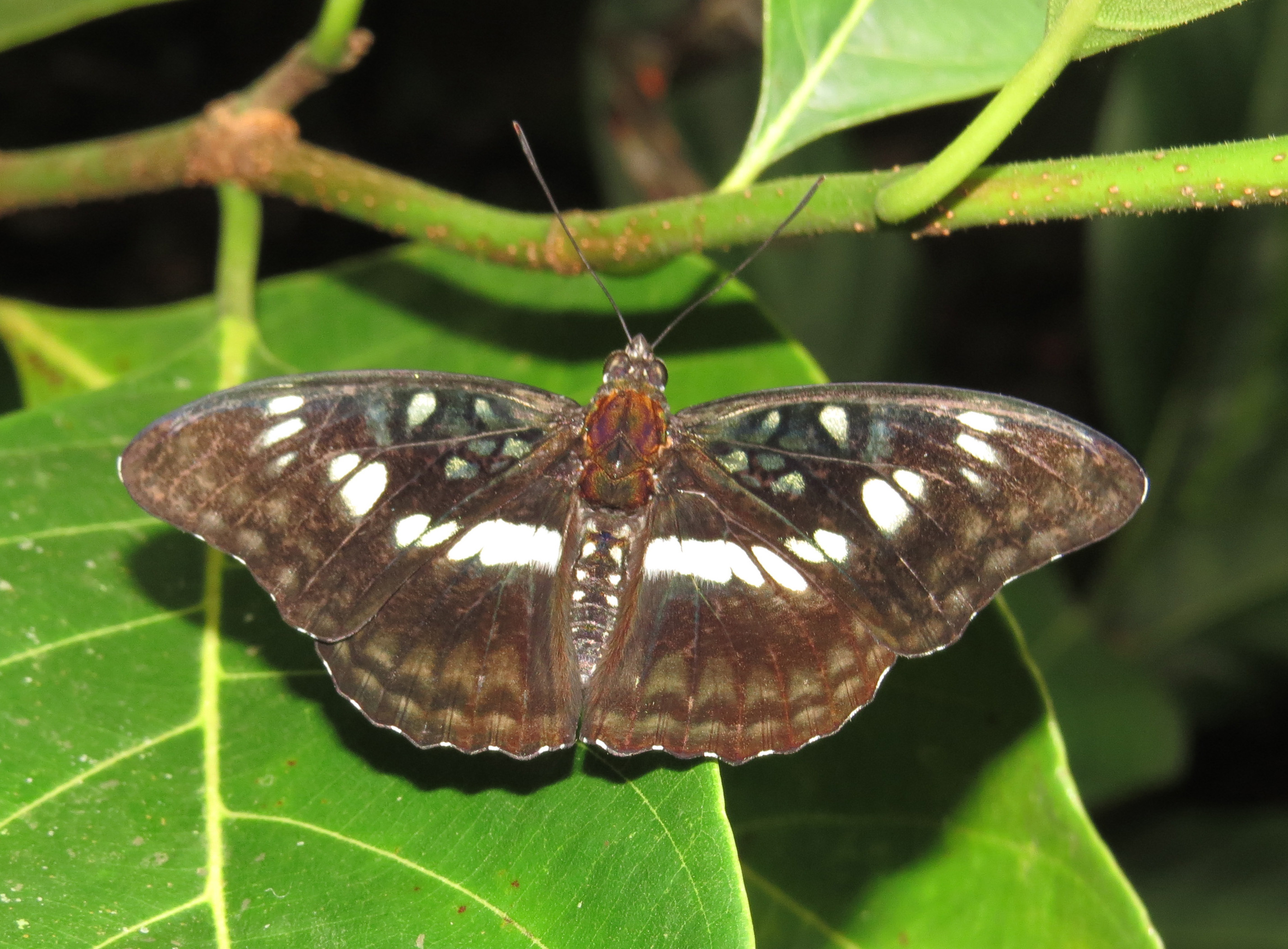
Dorsal view

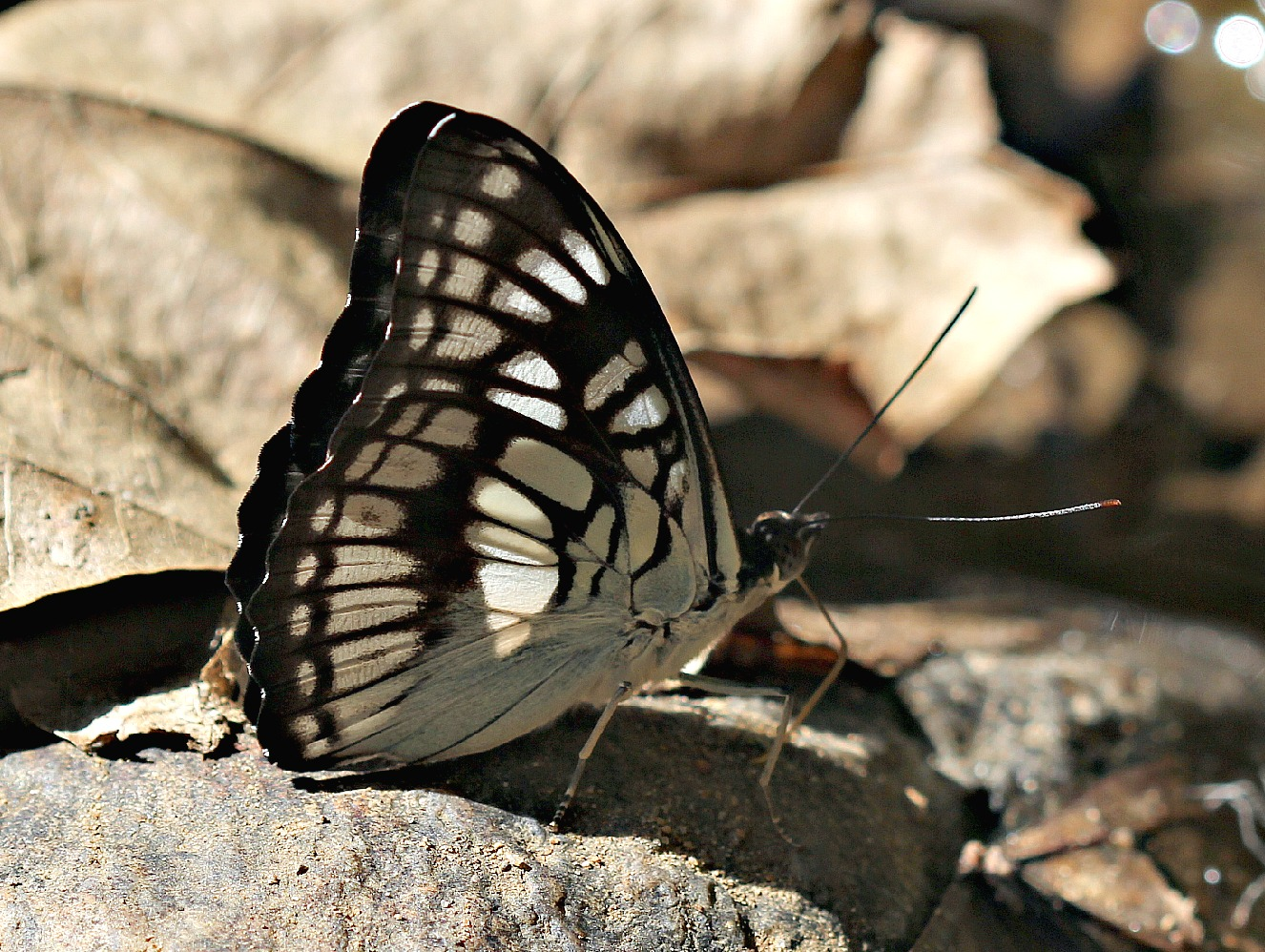
Ventral view

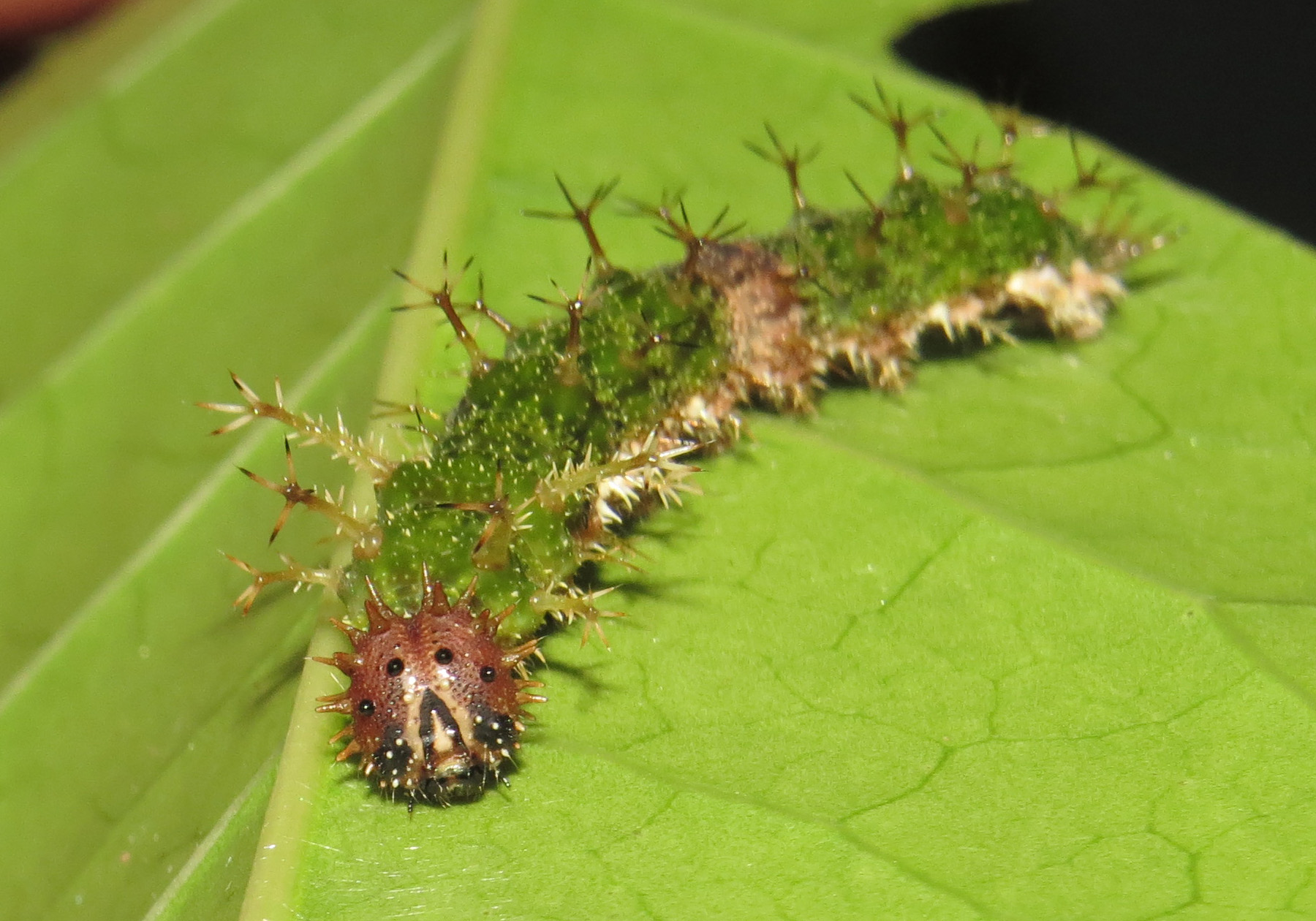
Larva

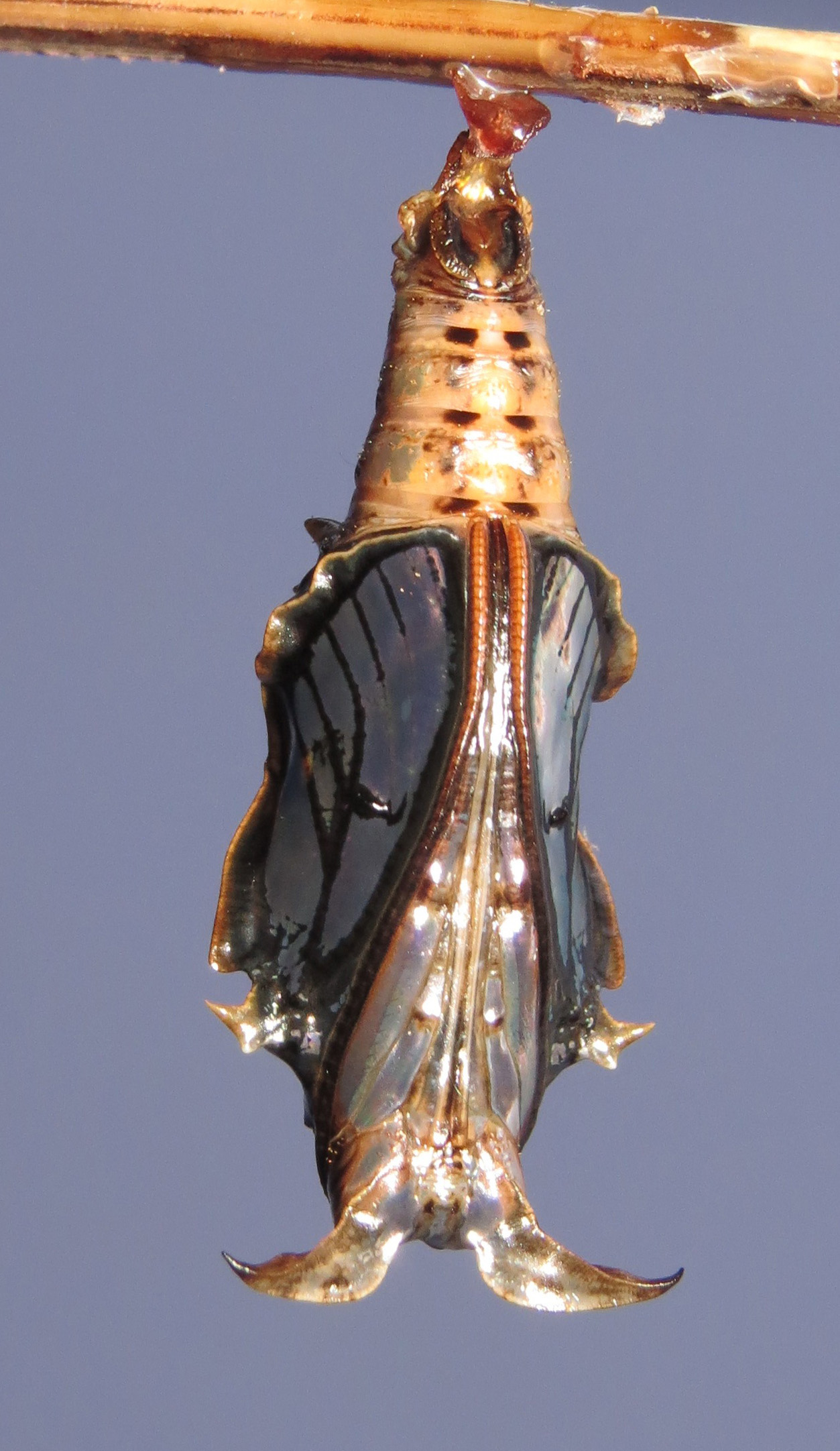
Pupa

===== Athyma selenophora (staff sergeant) =====
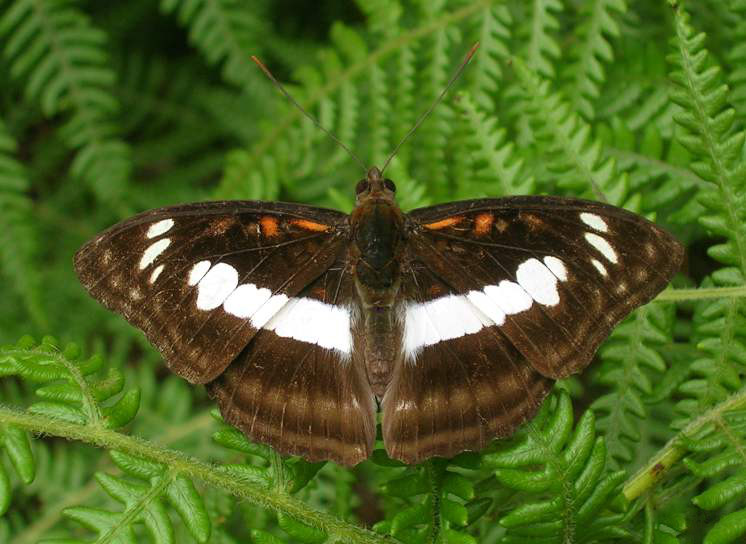
Dorsal view (male)

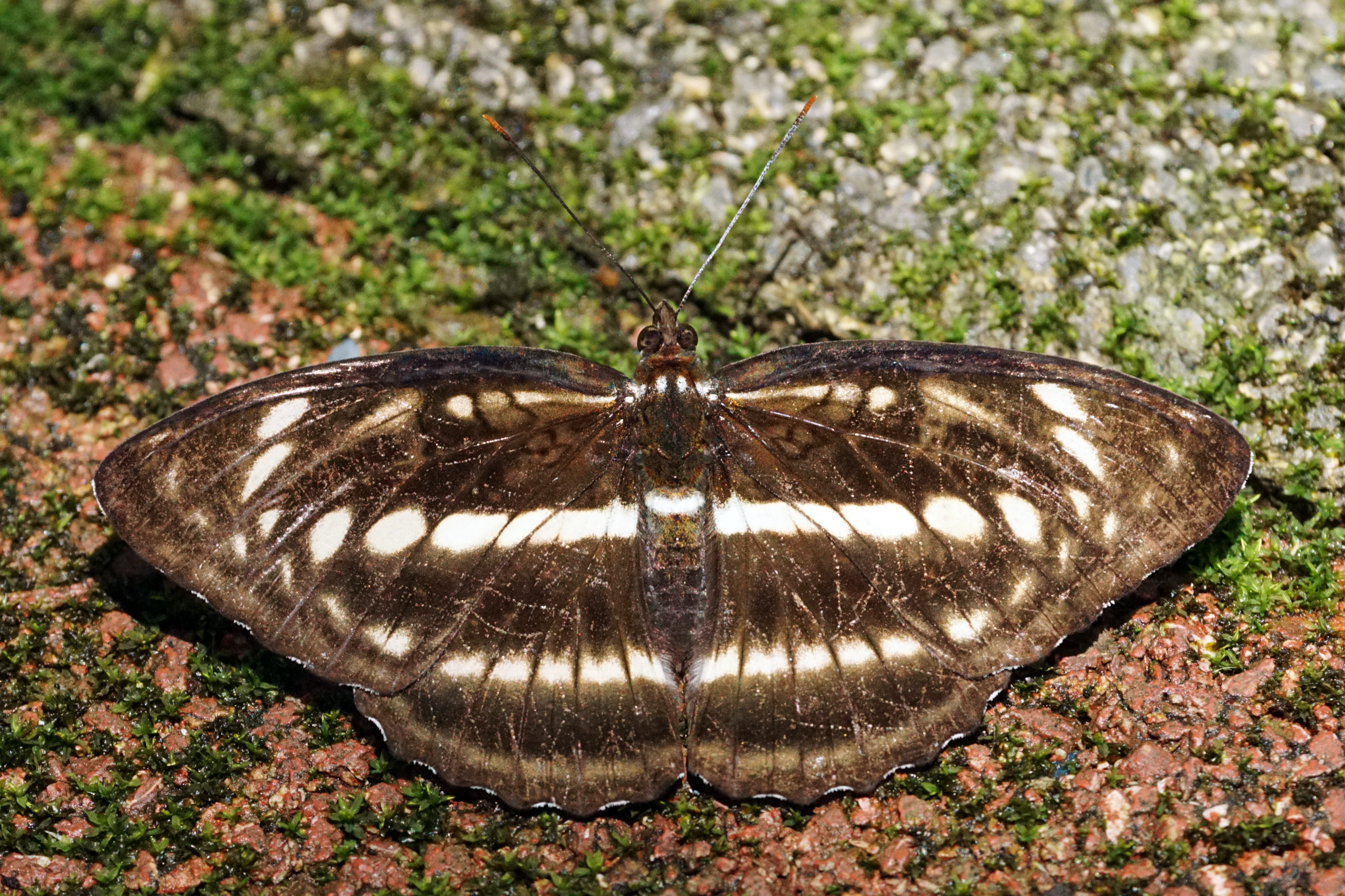
Dorsal view (female)

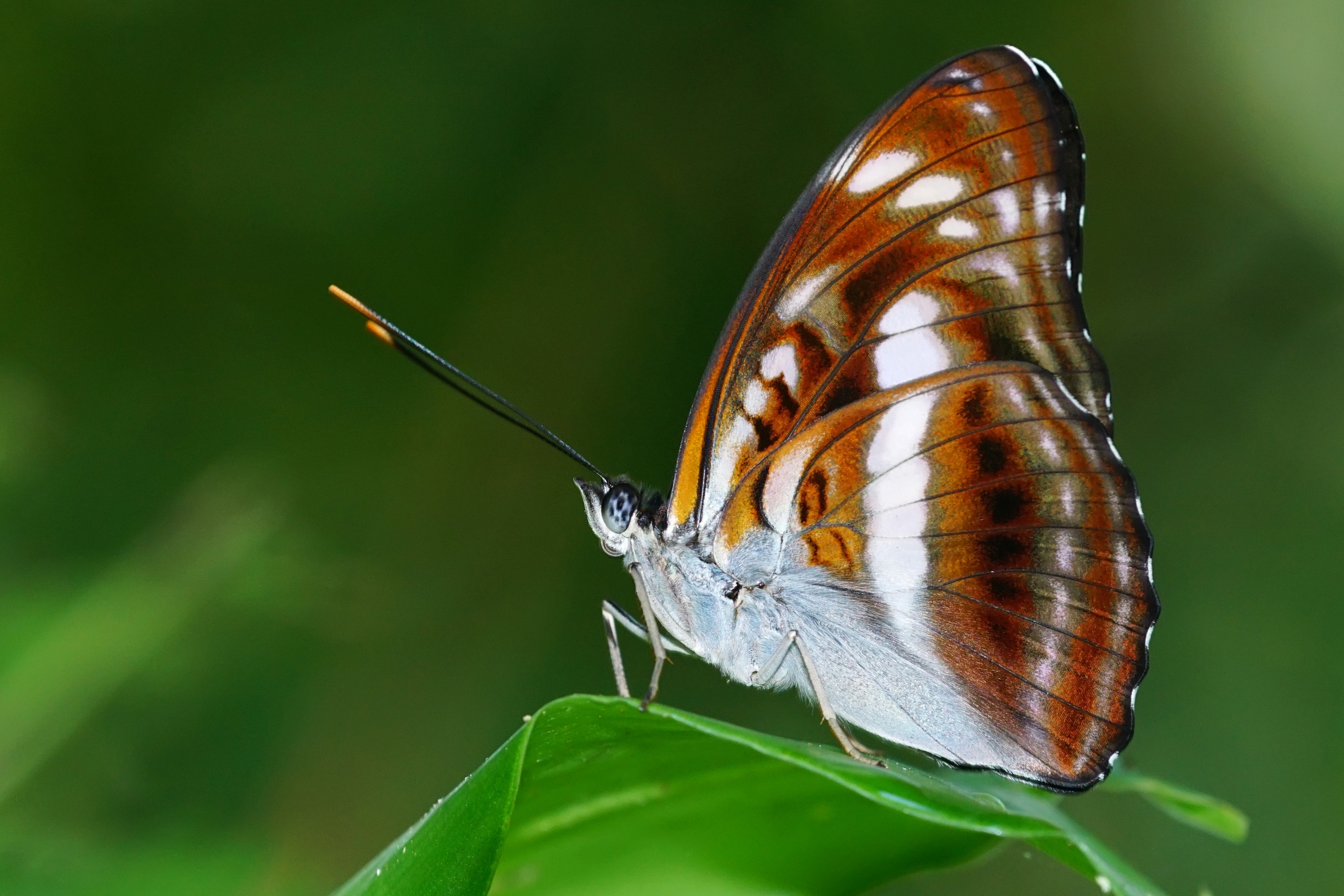
Ventral view

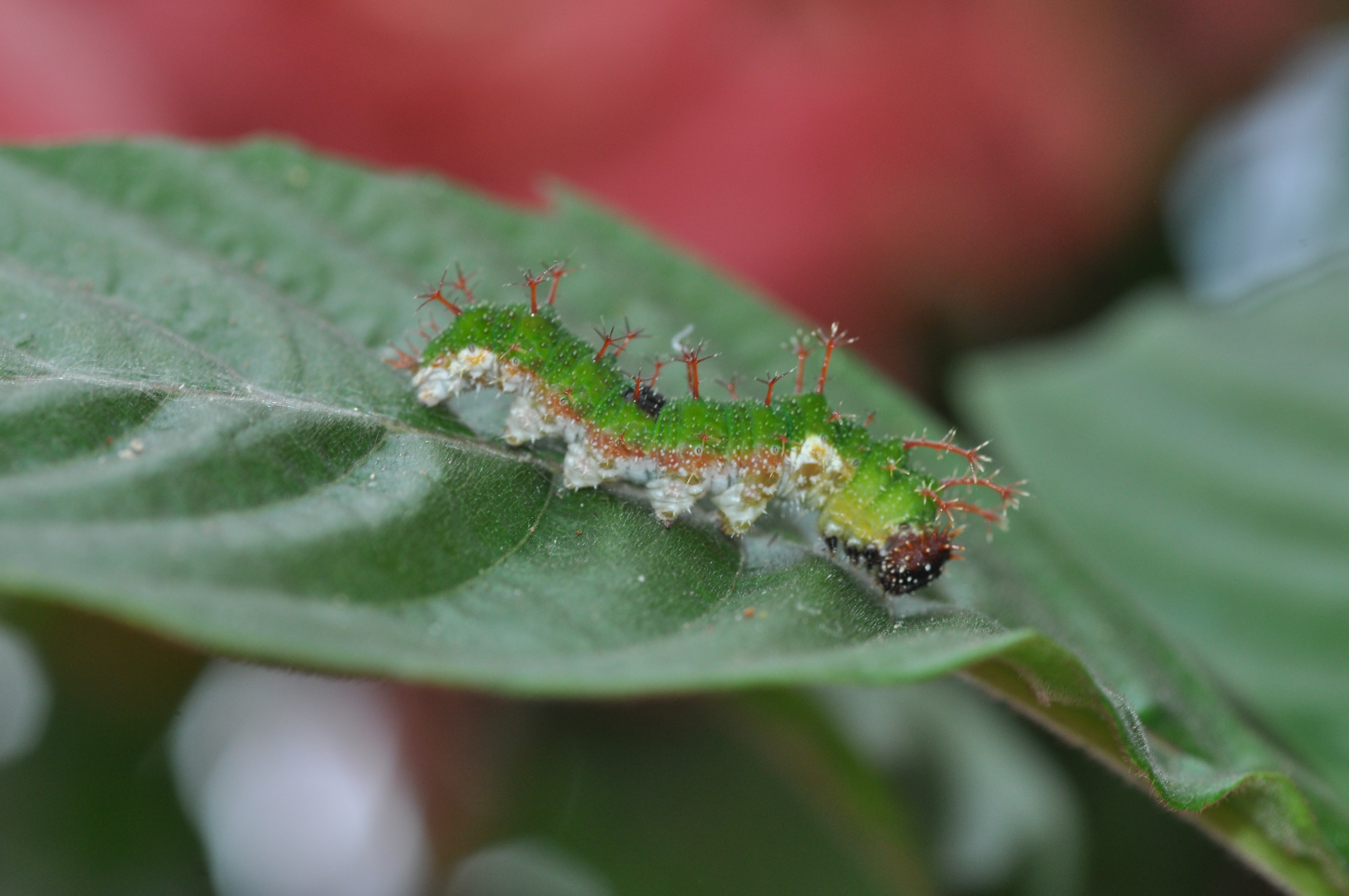
Larva

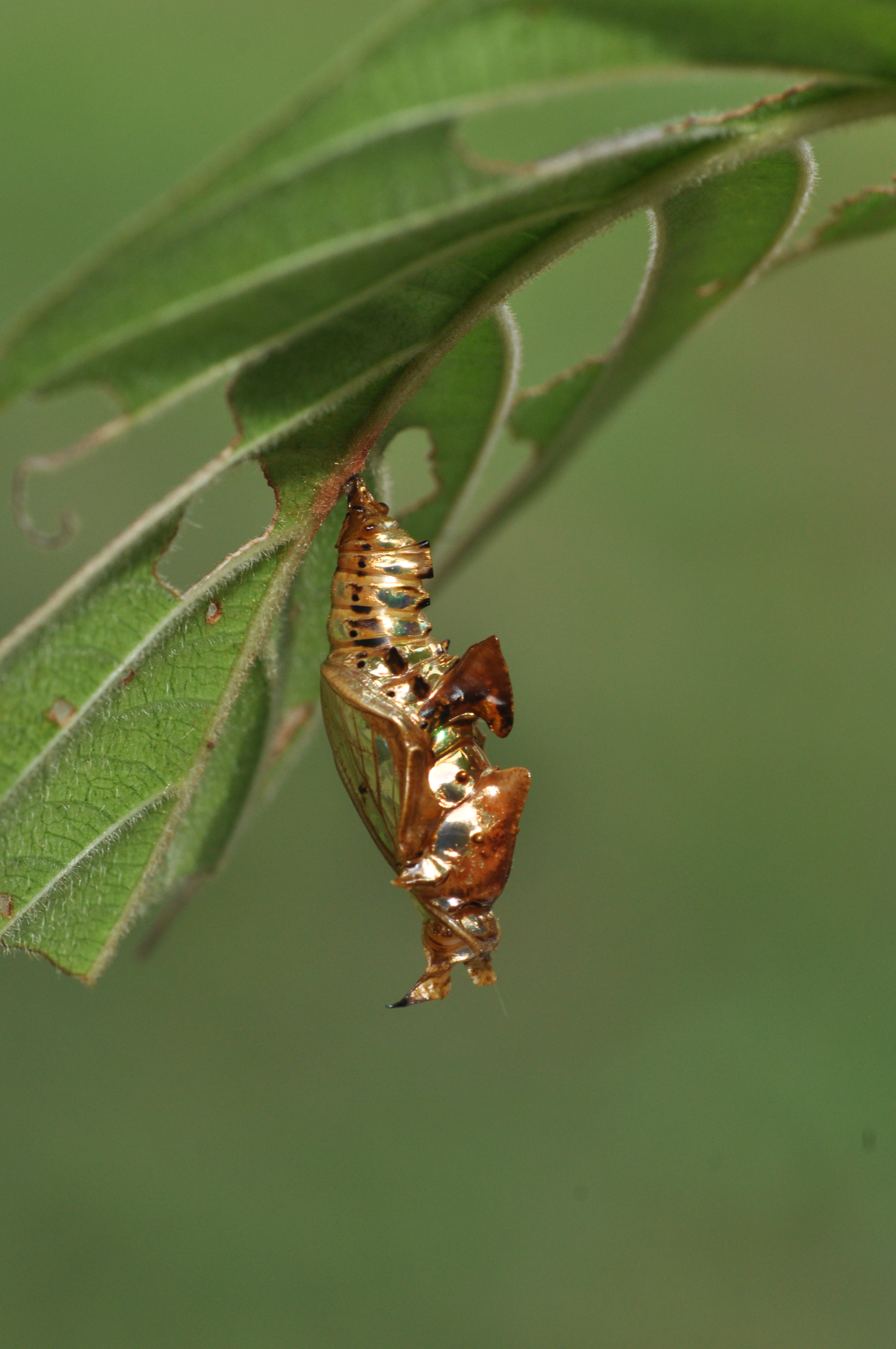
Pupa

==== Genus: Dophla (dukes) ====
===== Dophla evelina (red-spot duke) =====
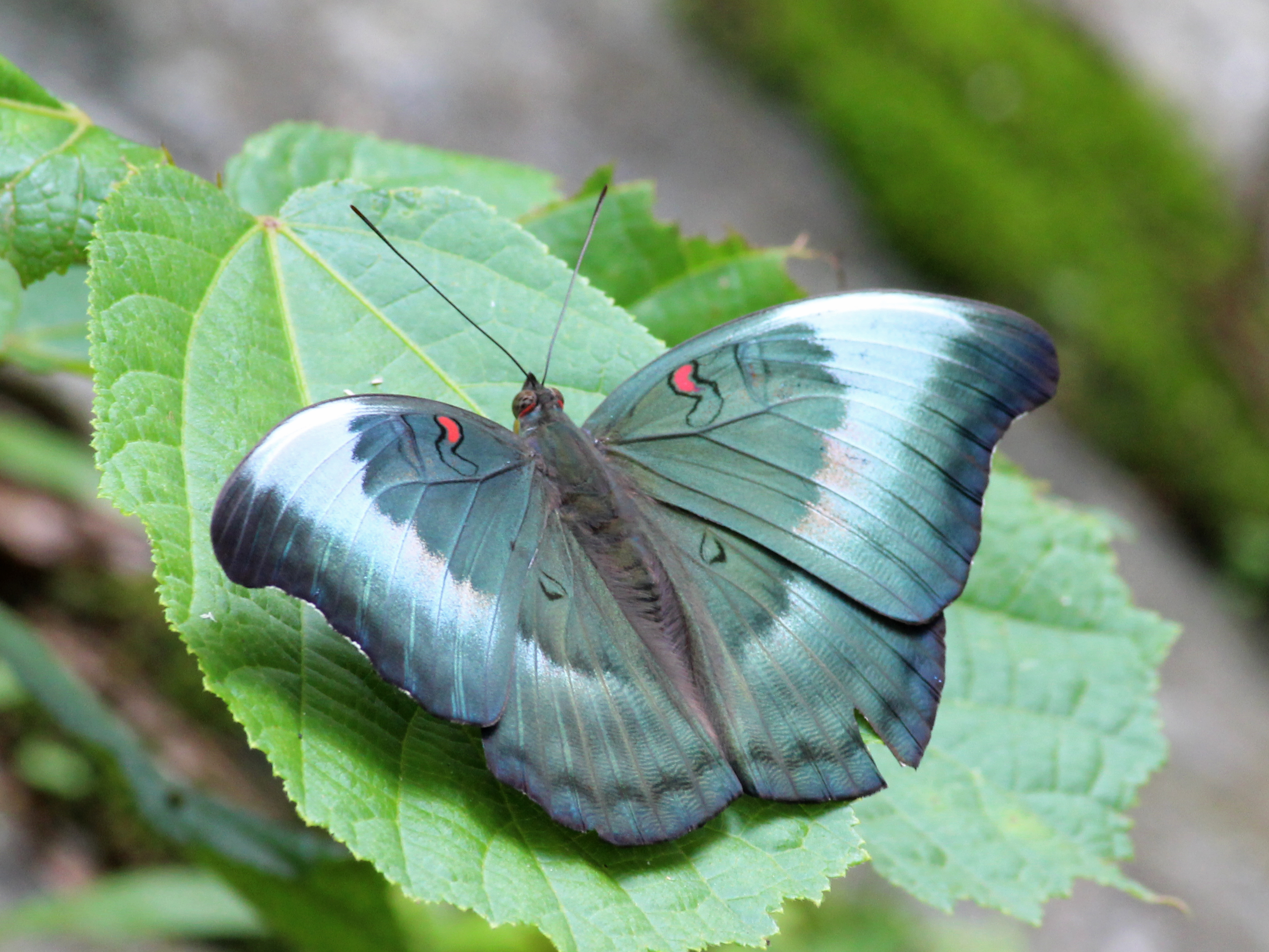
Dorsal view

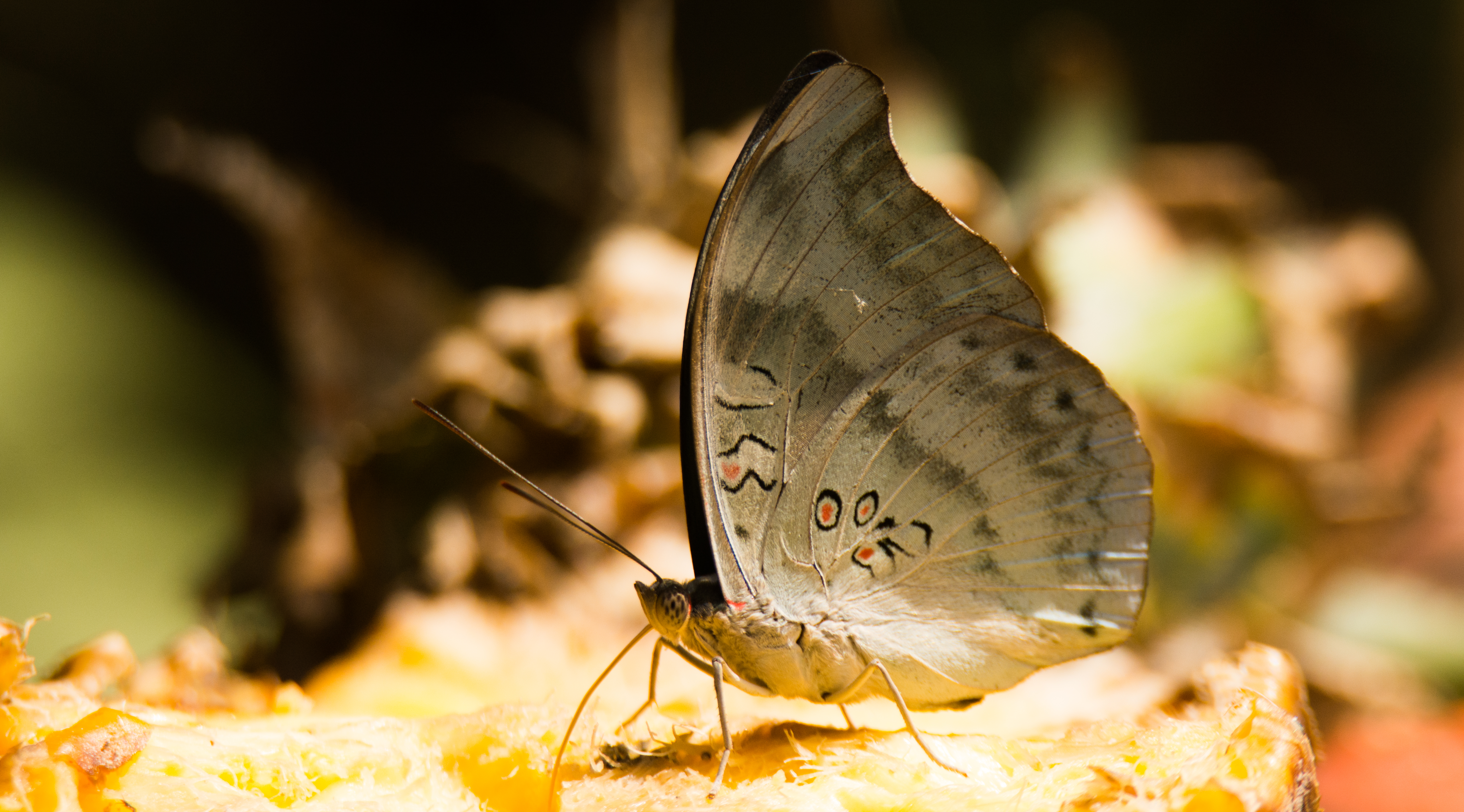
Ventral view

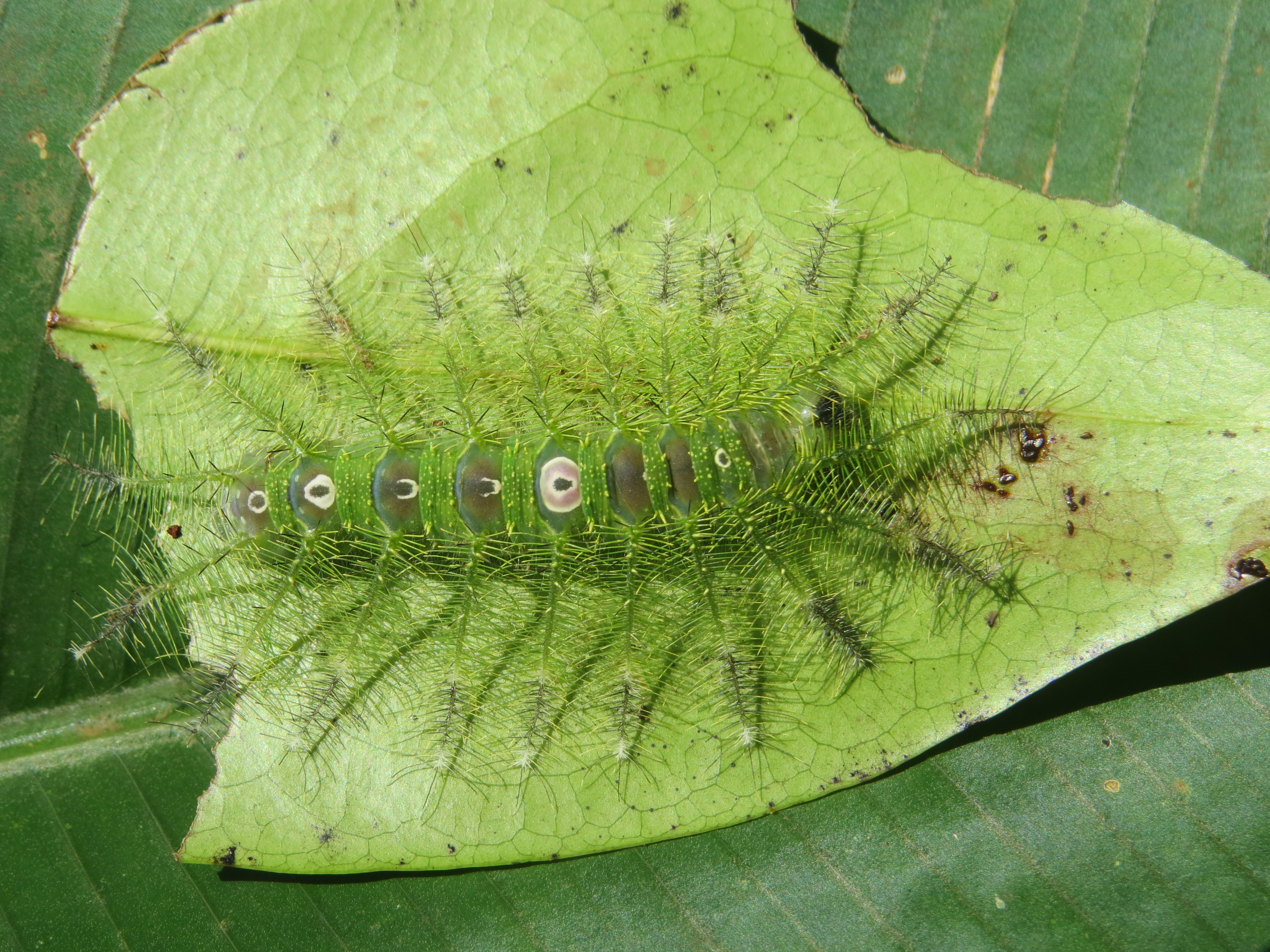
Larva

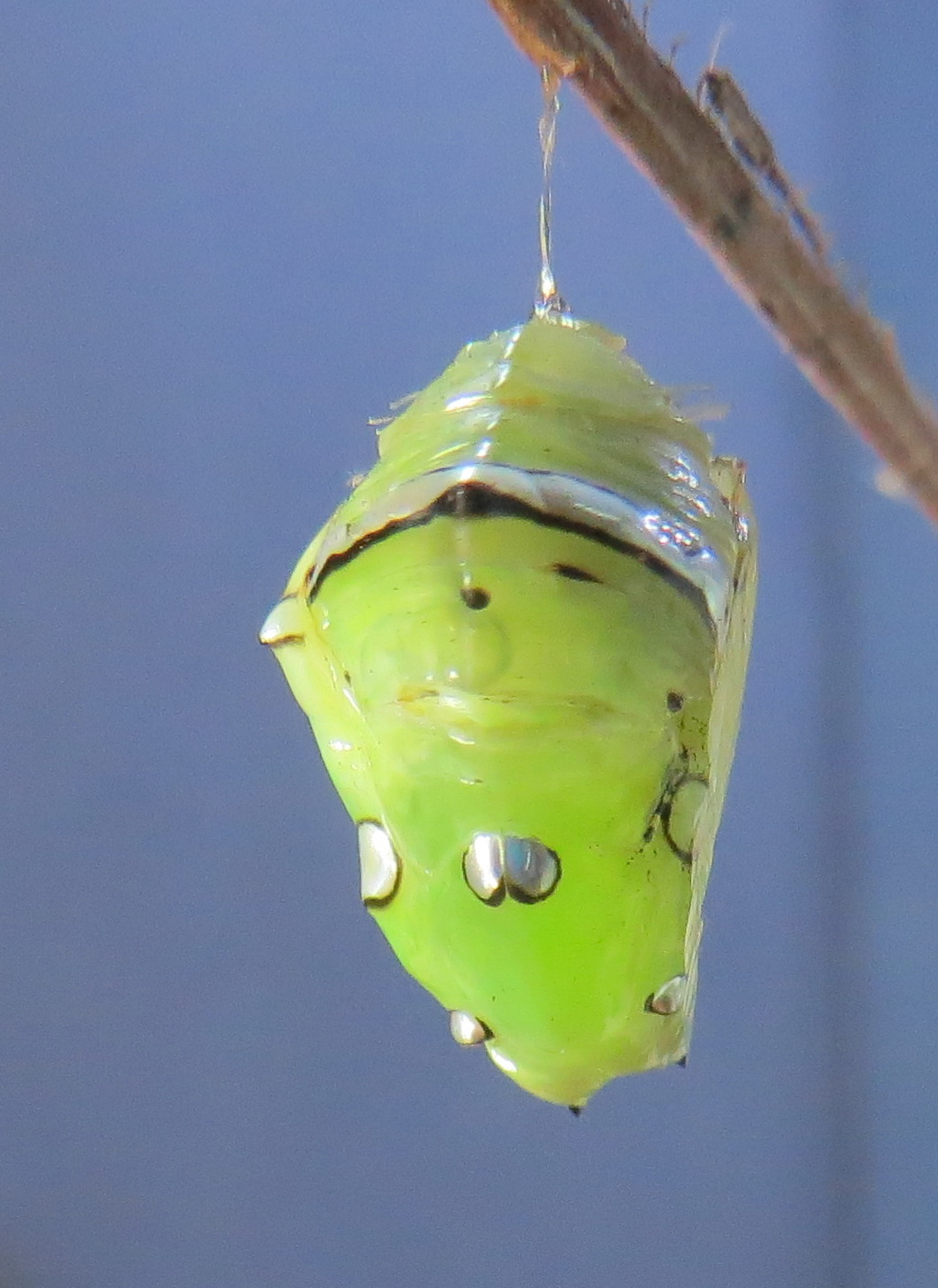
Pupa

==== Genus: Euthalia (barons) ====
===== Euthalia aconthea (common baron) =====
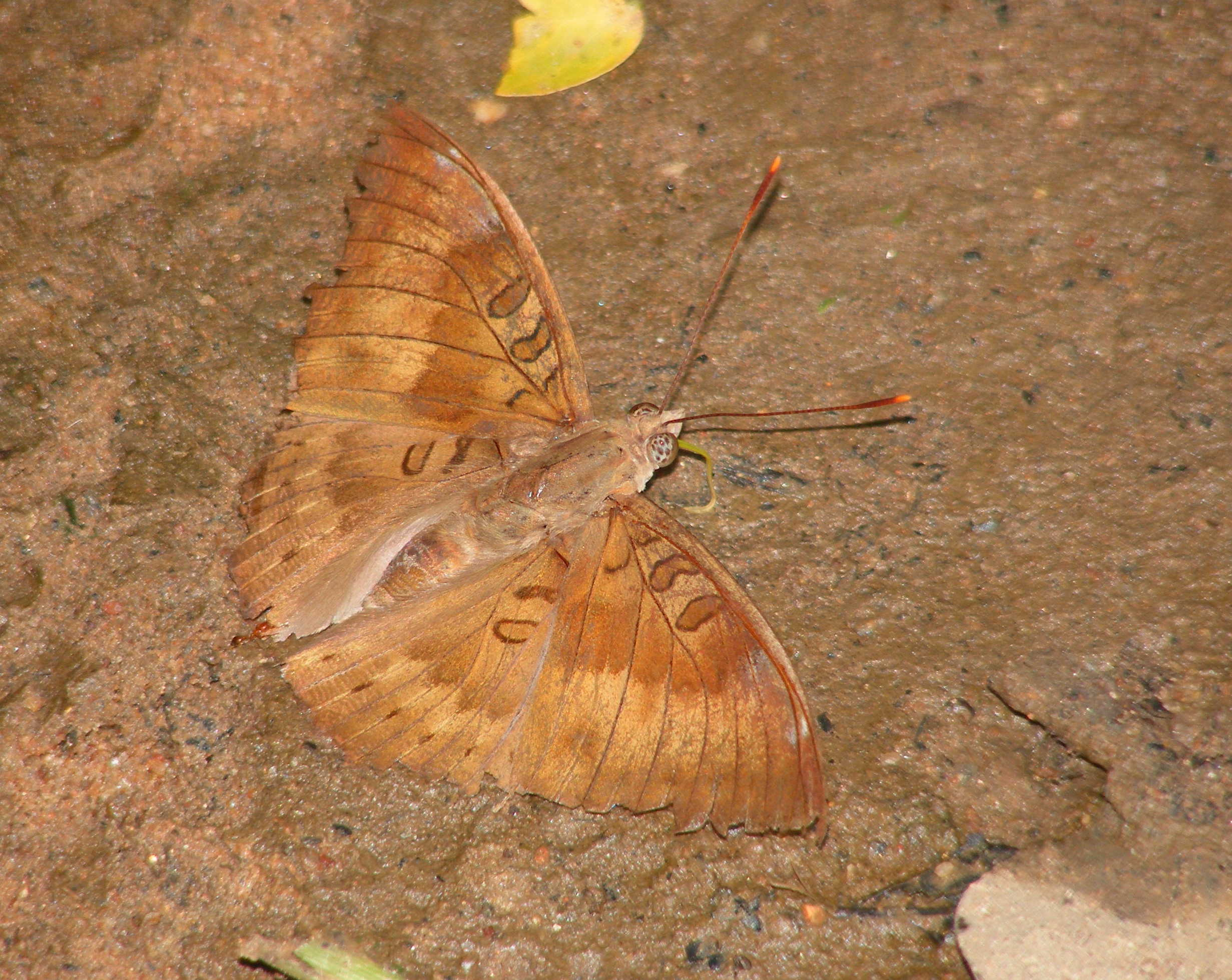
Dorsal view (male)

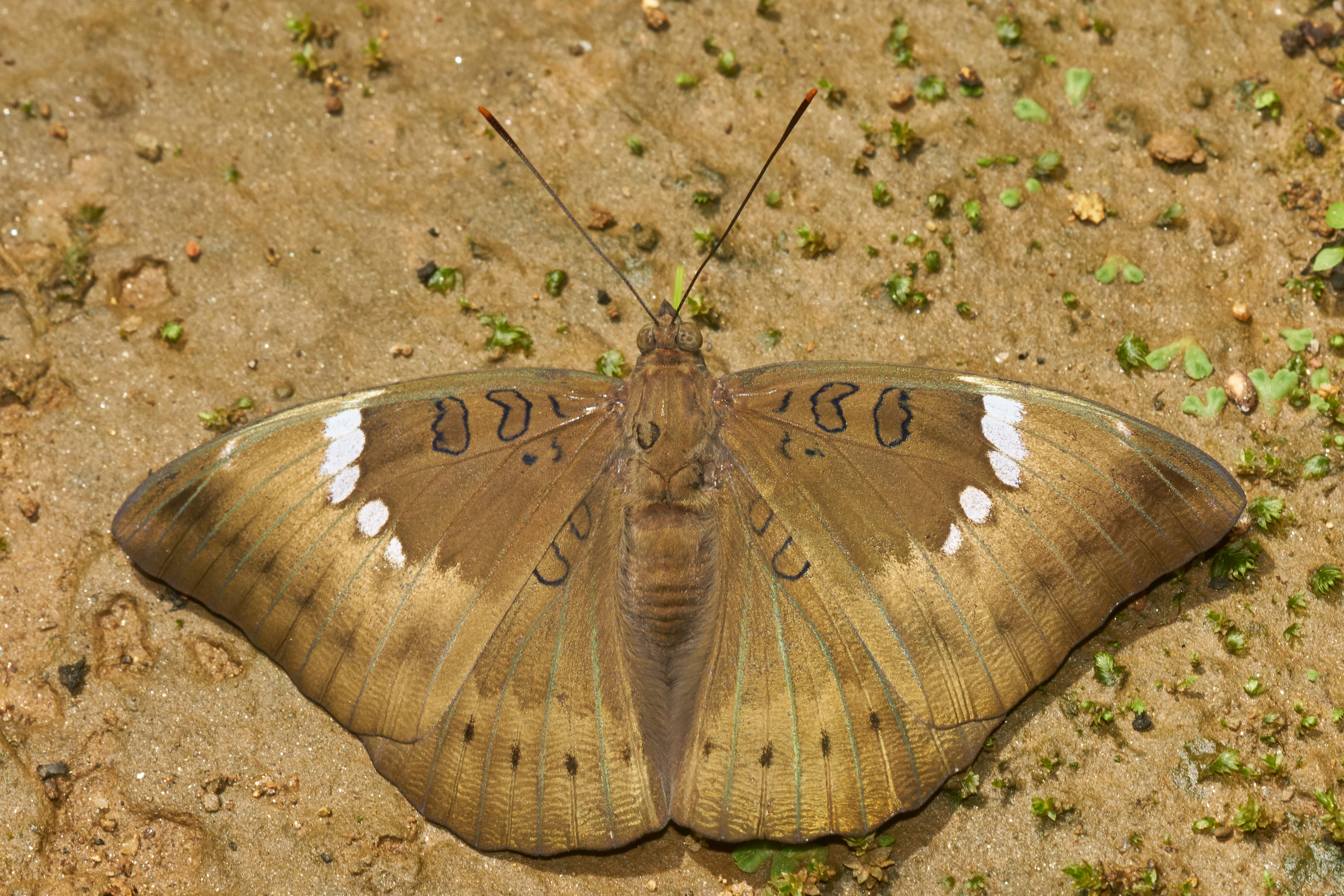
Dorsal view (female)

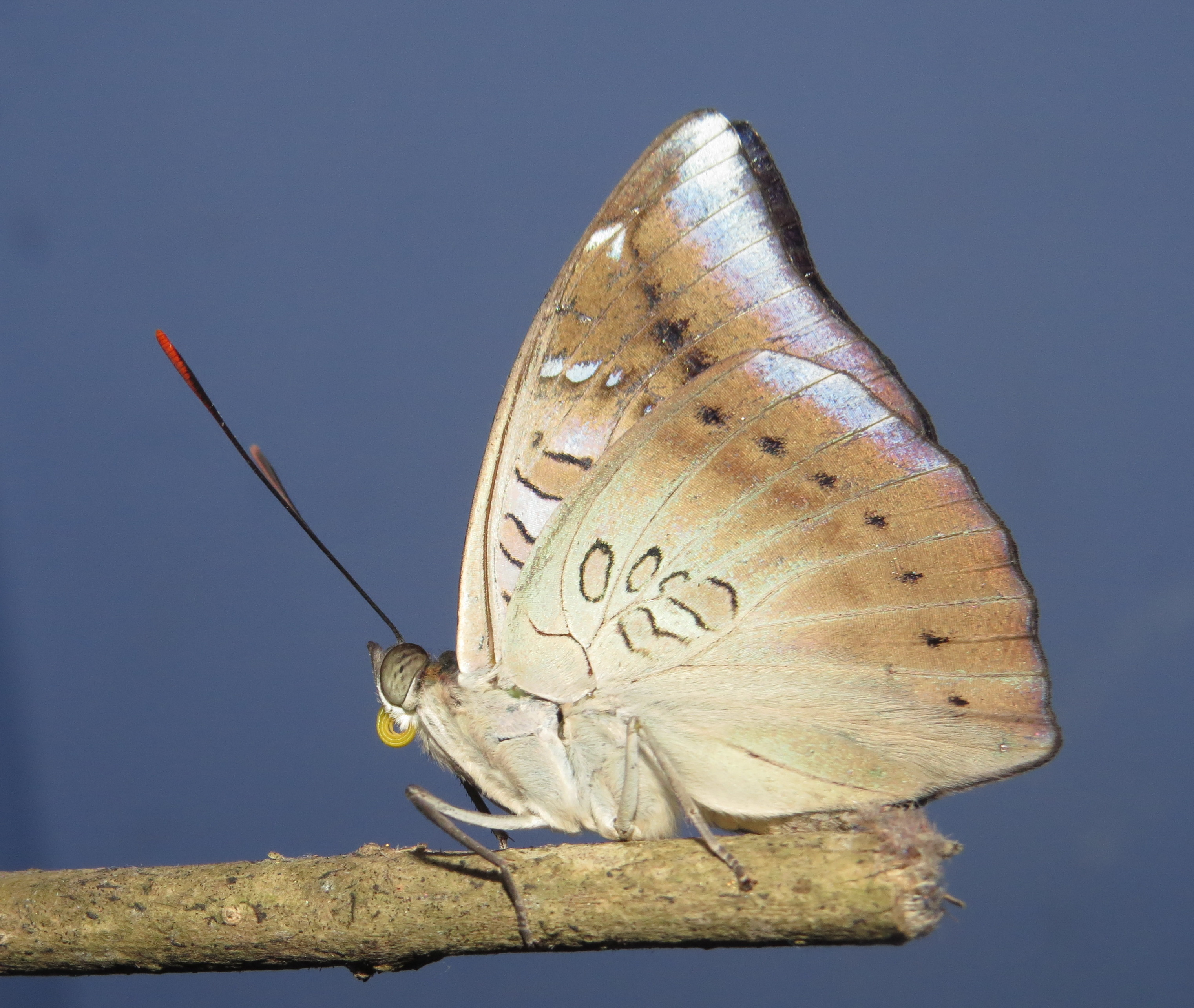
Ventral view (female)

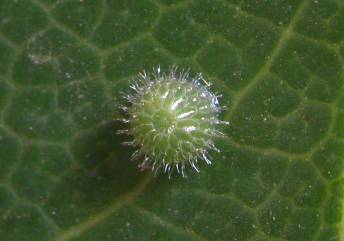
Egg

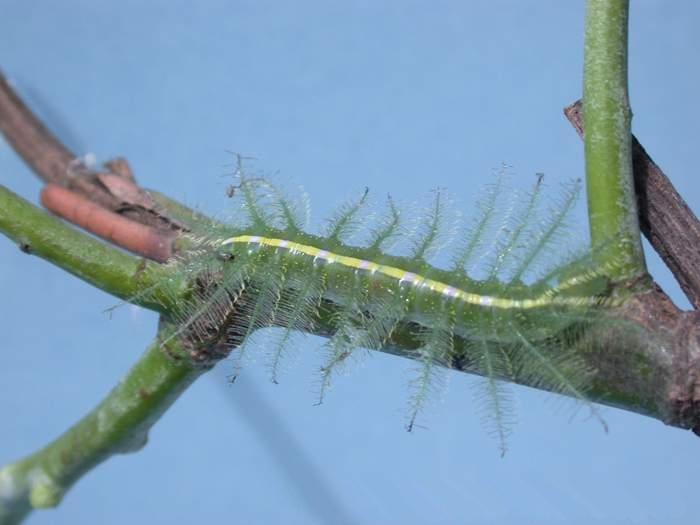
Larva

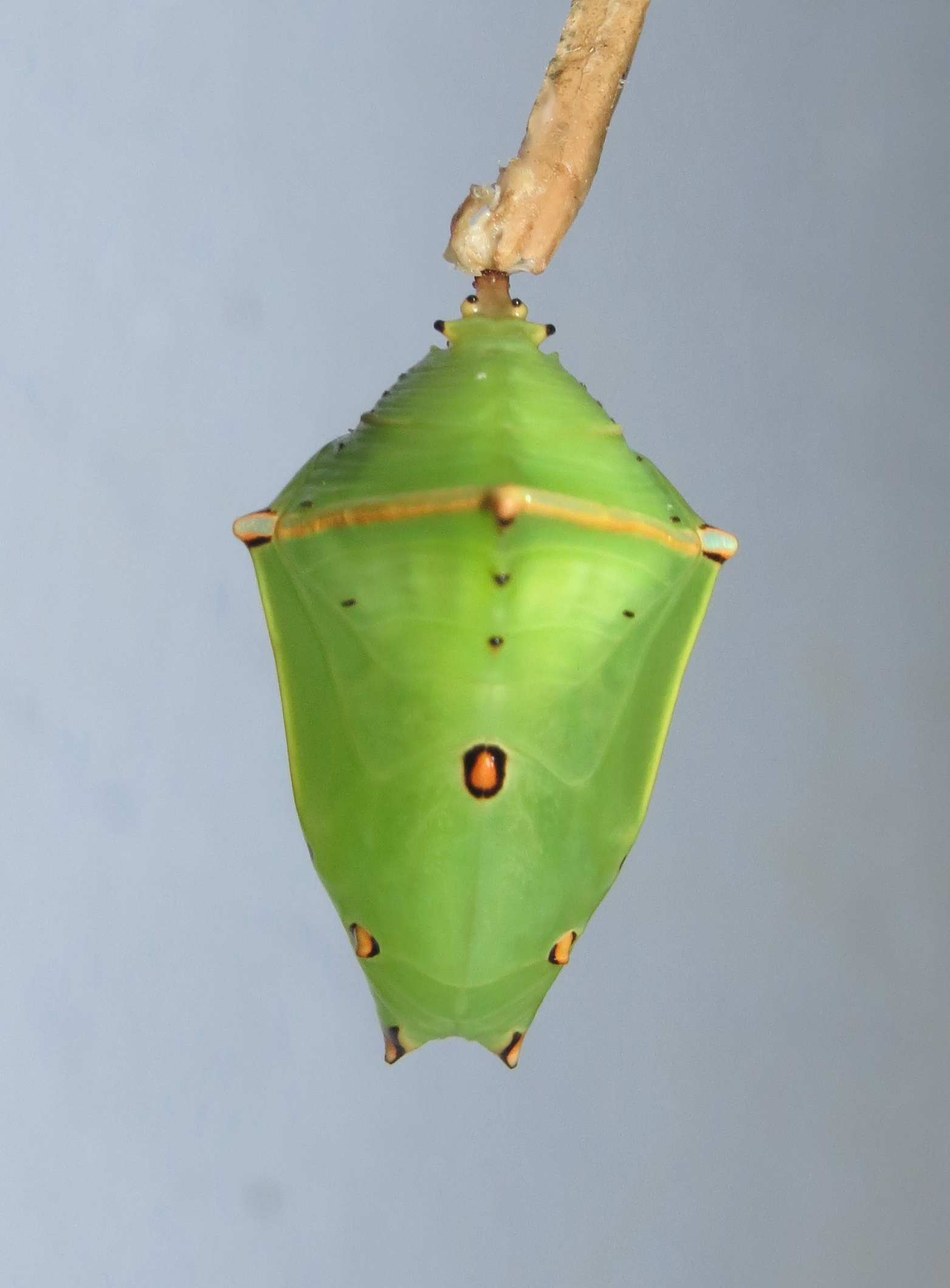
Pupa

===== Euthalia lubentina (gaudy baron) =====
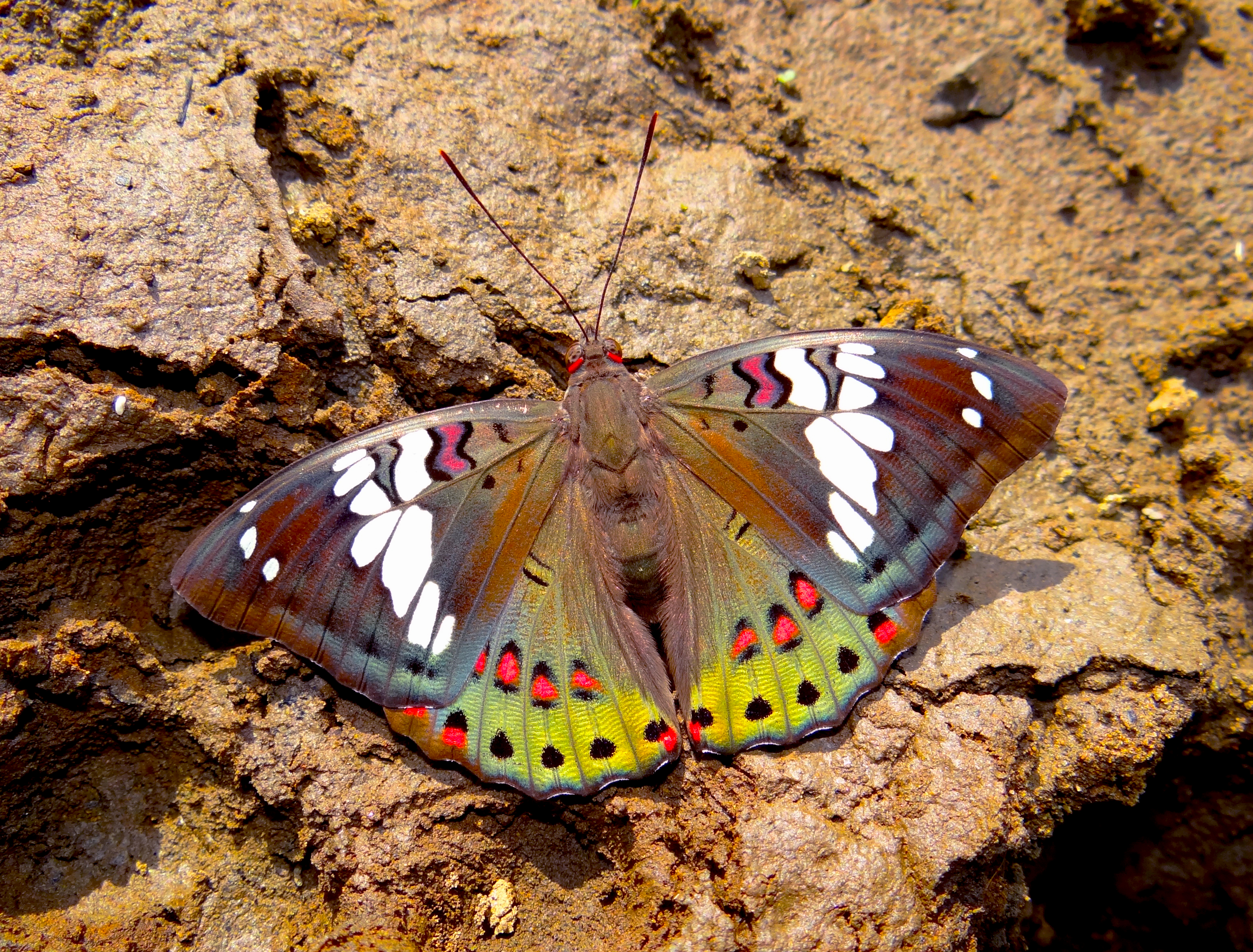
Dorsal view

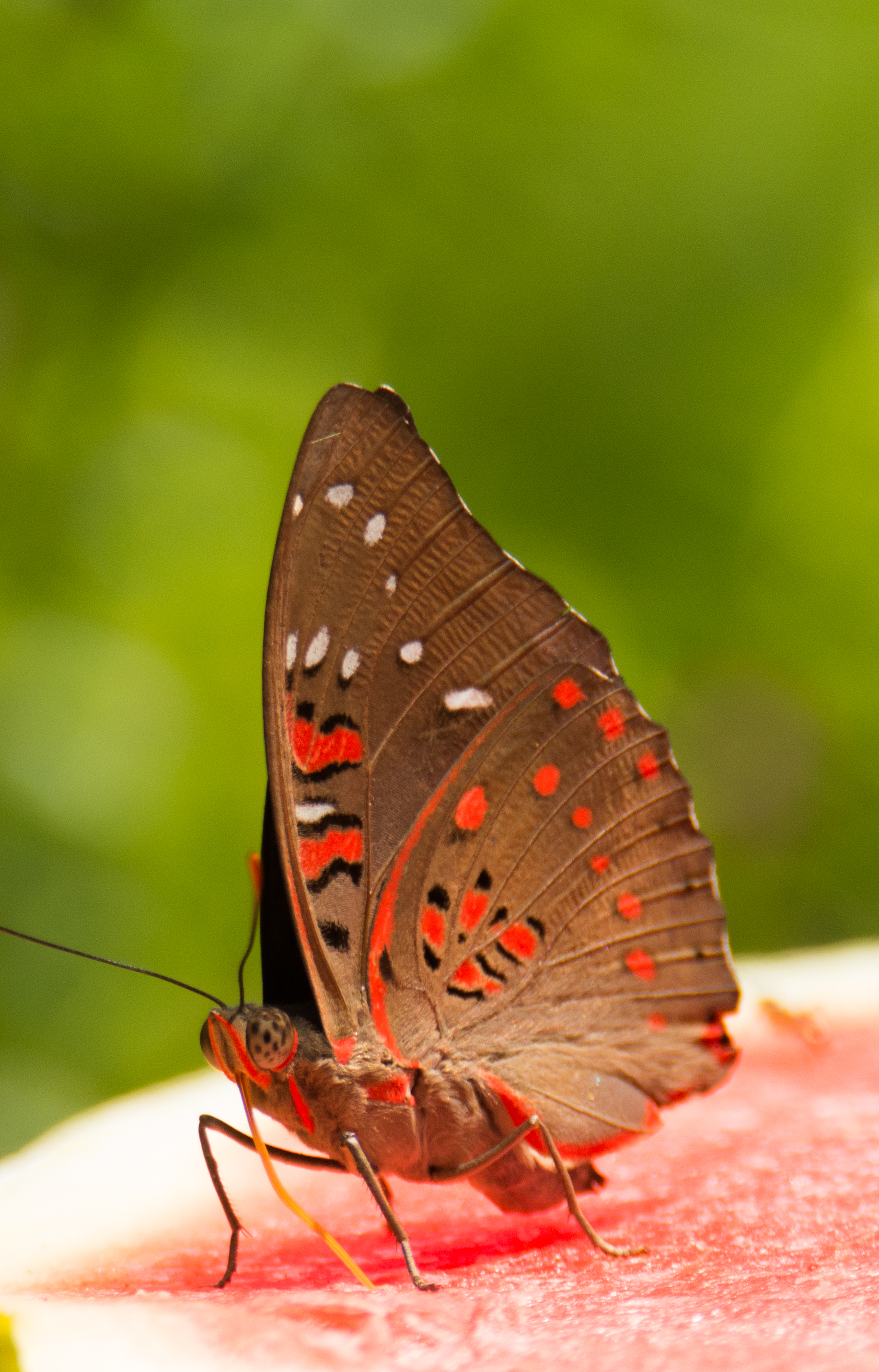
Ventral view

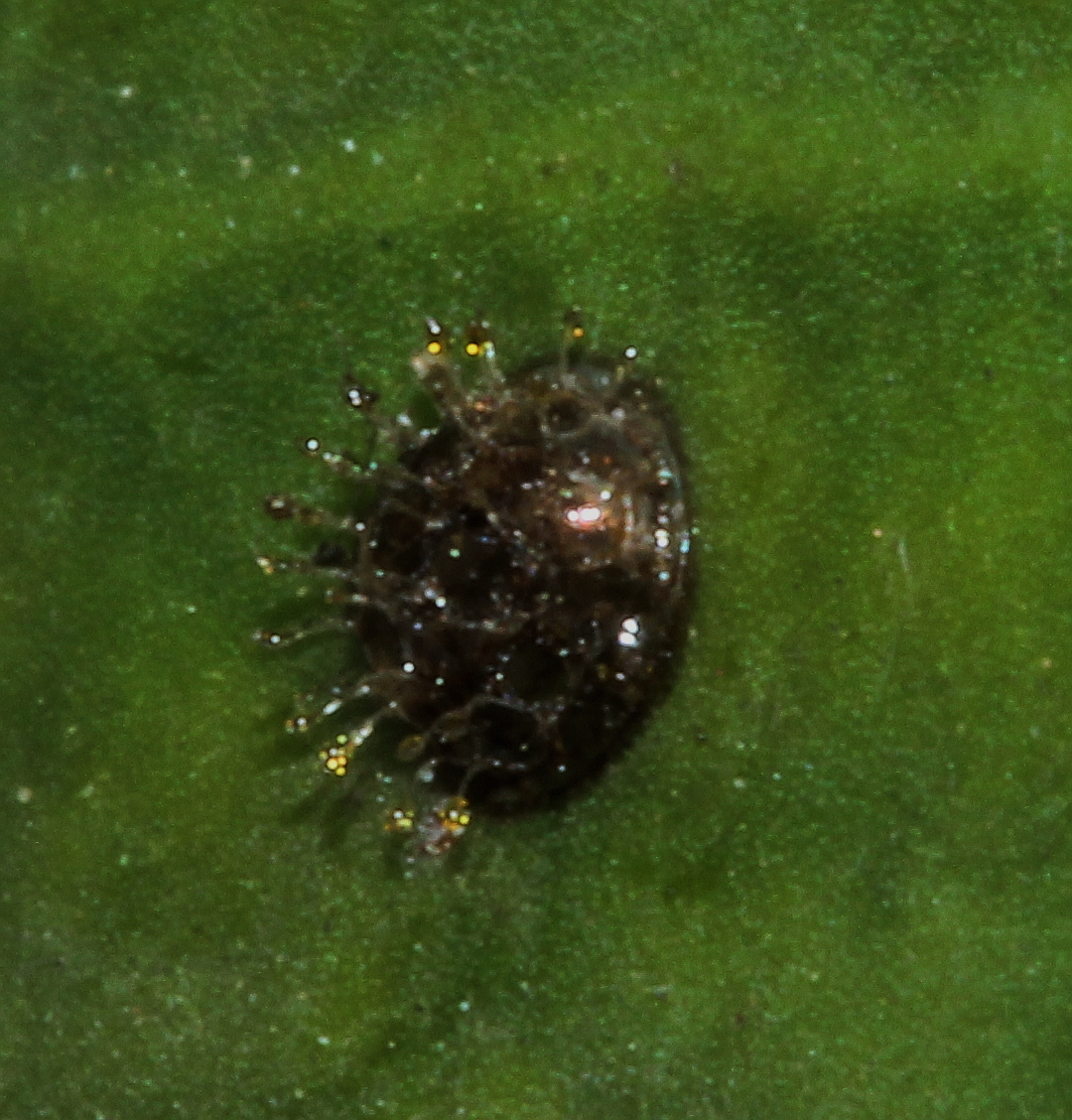
Egg

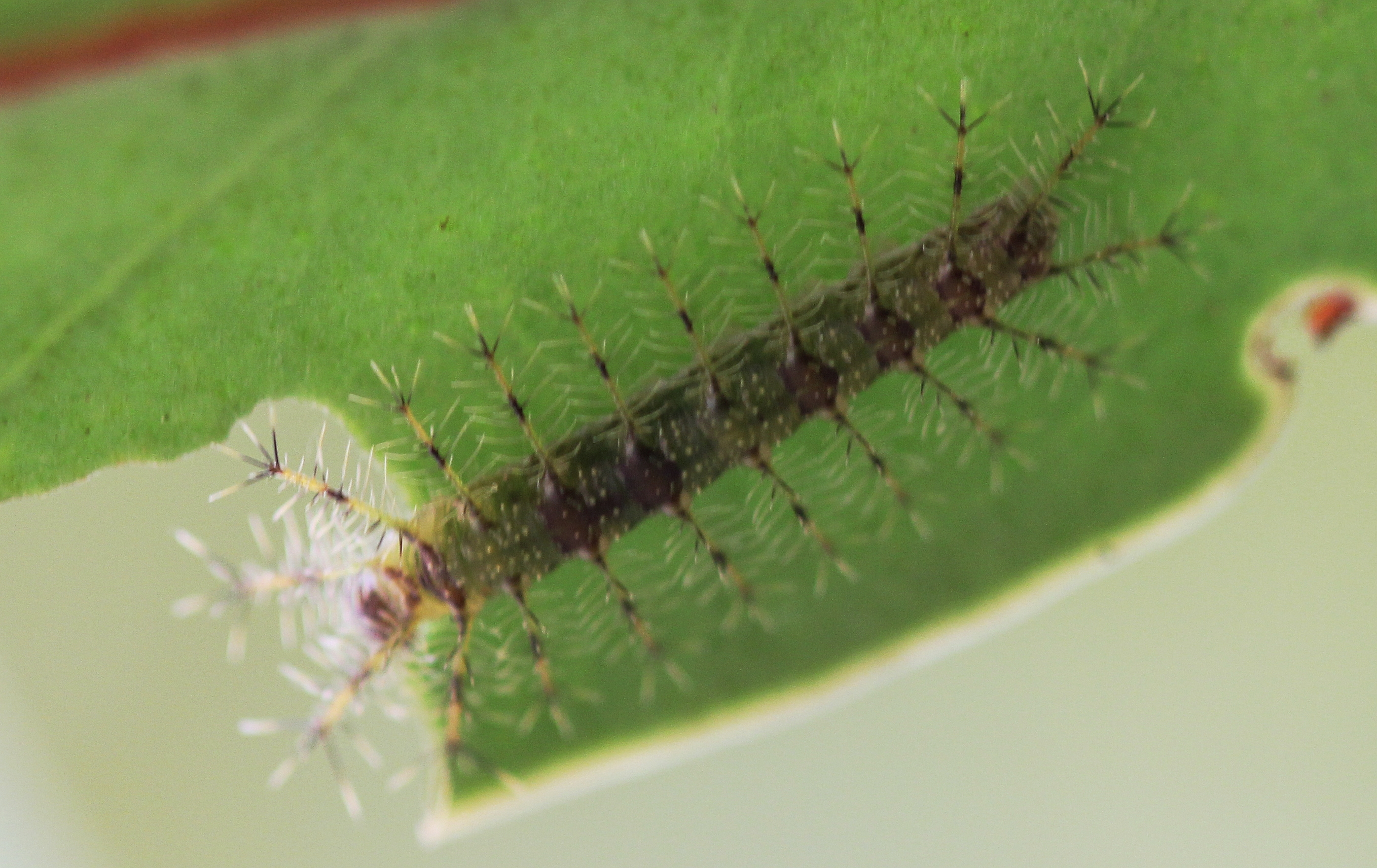
Larva

===== Euthalia nais/Symphaedra nais (baronet) =====
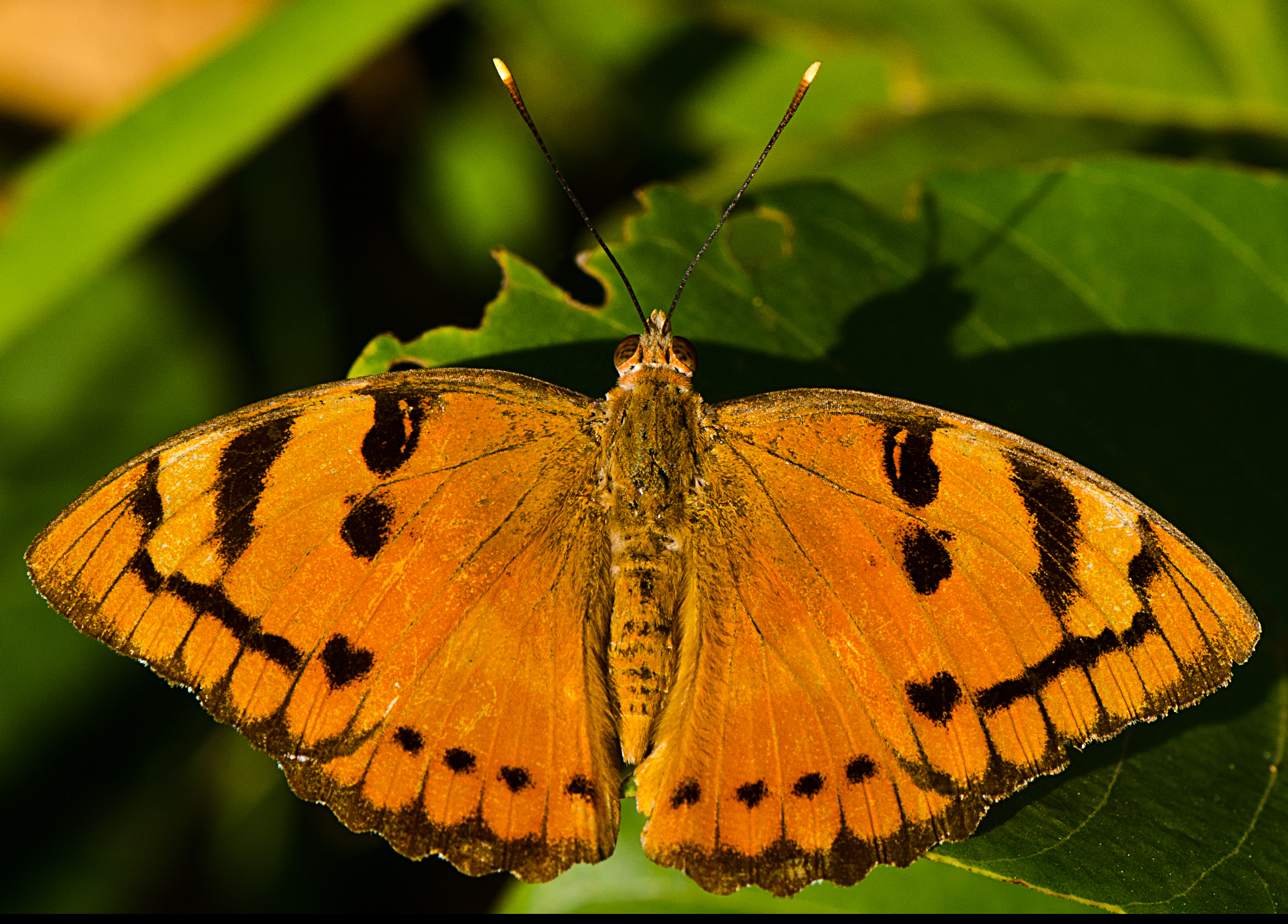
Dorsal view

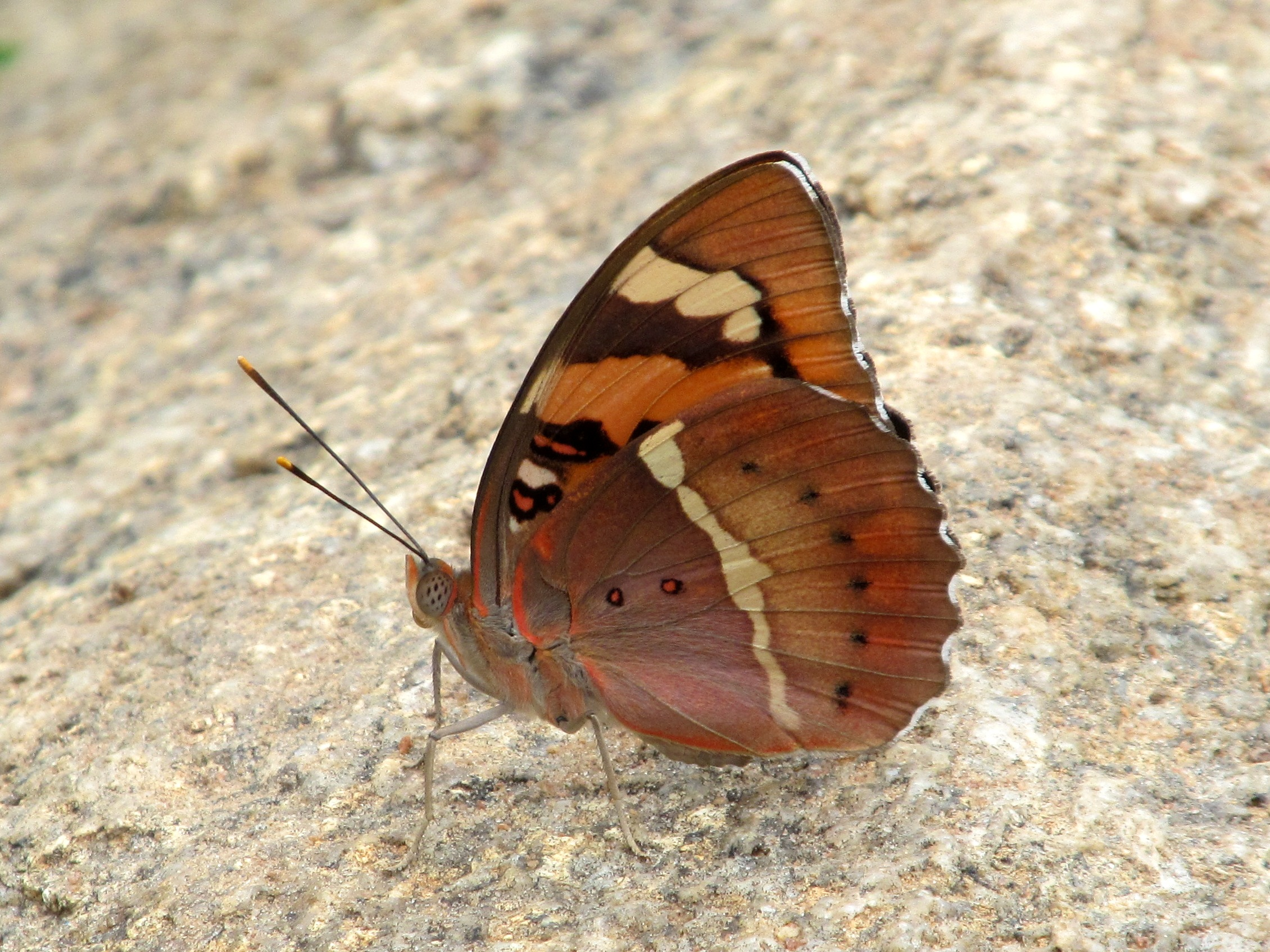
Ventral view

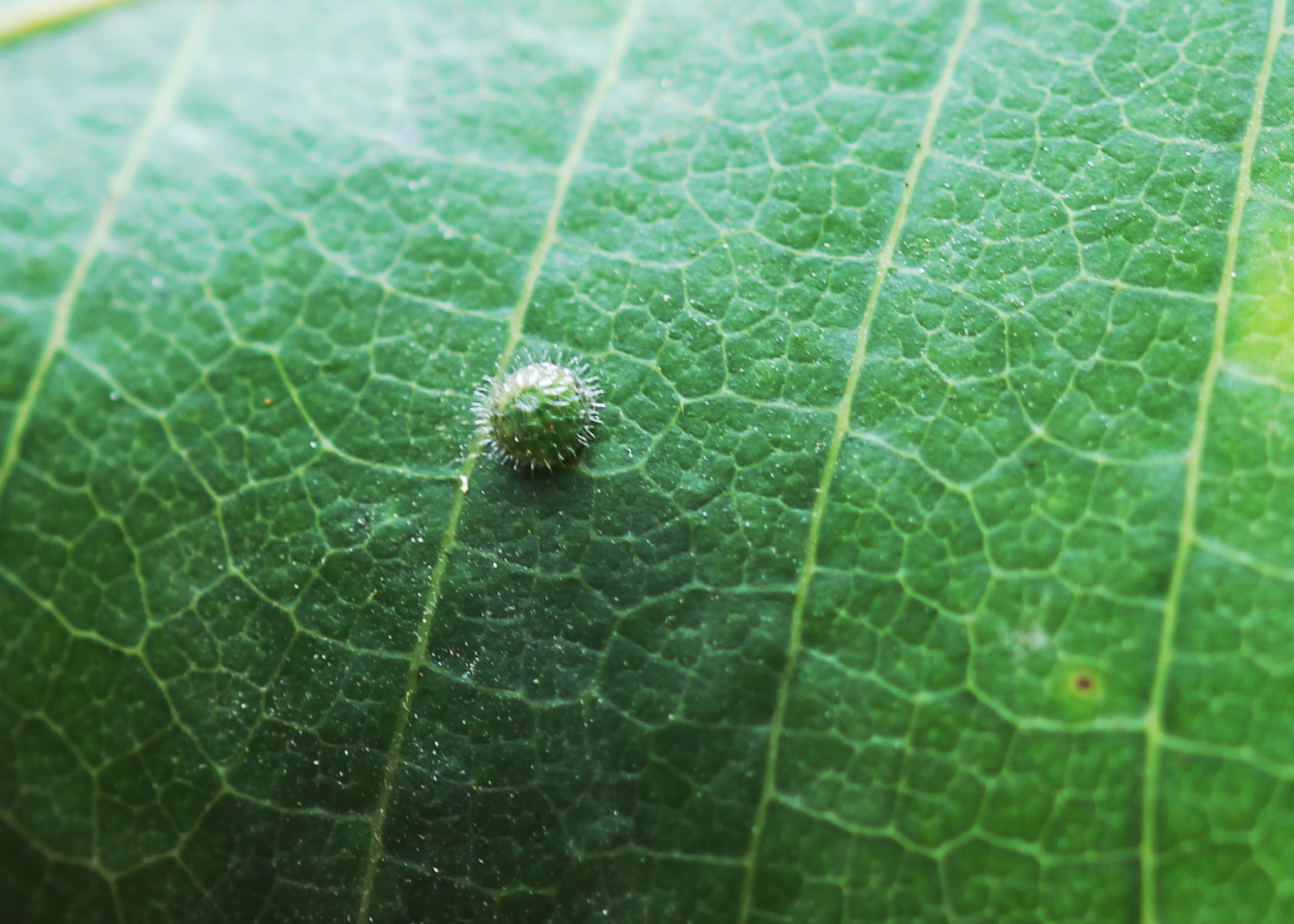
Egg

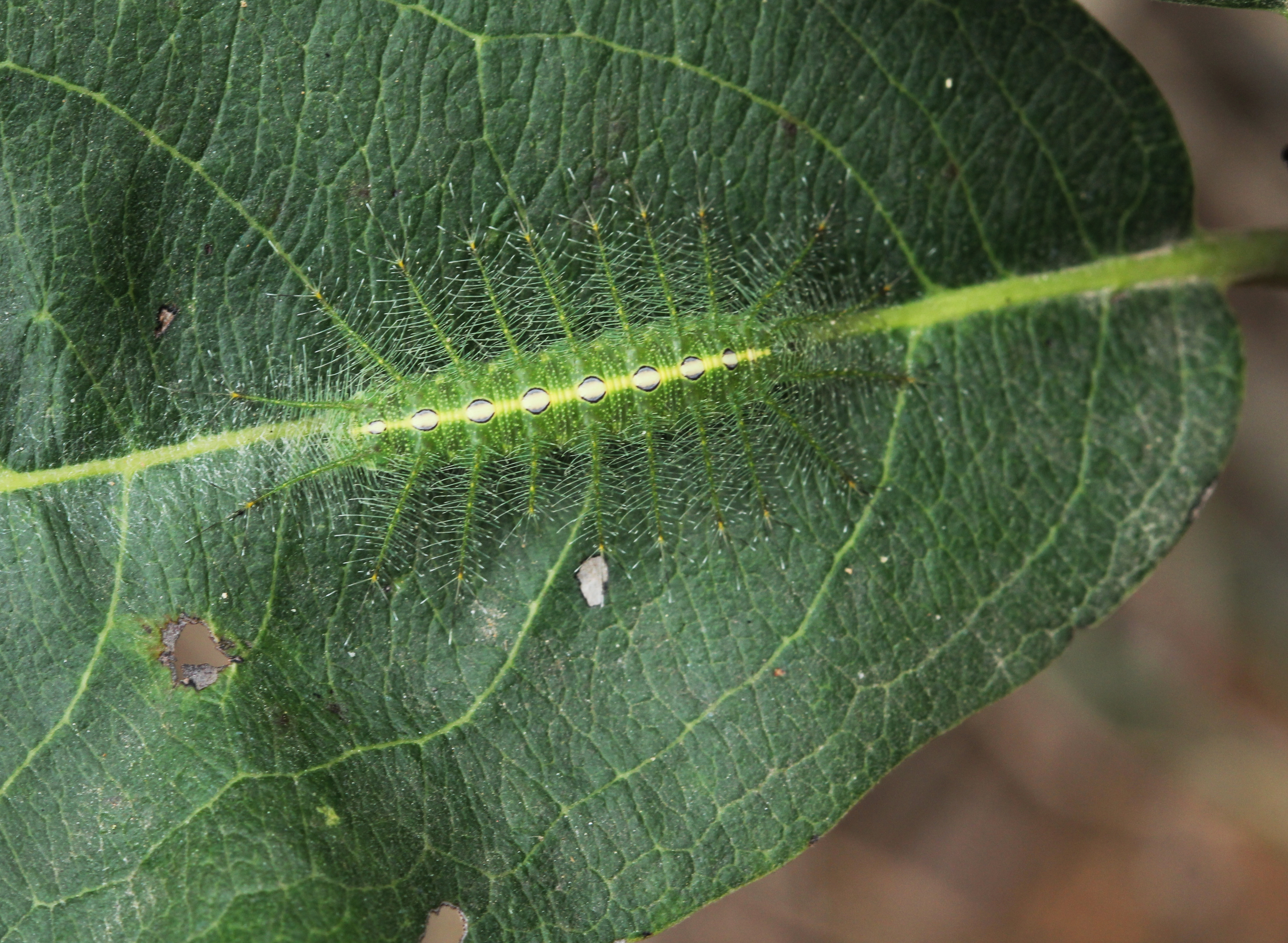
Larva

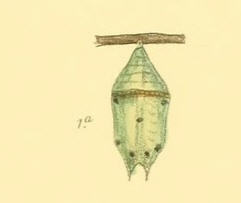
Pupa

===== Euthalia telchinia (blue baron) =====
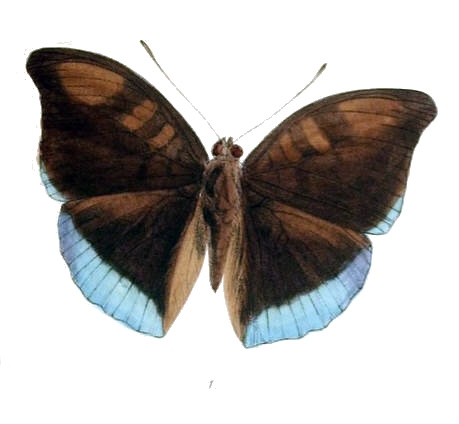
Dorsal view (male)

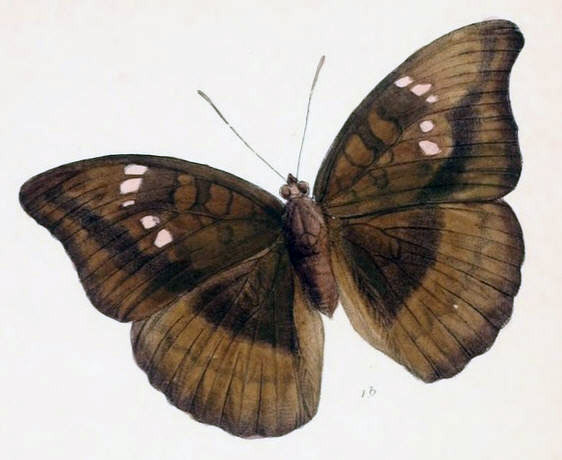
Dorsal view (female)

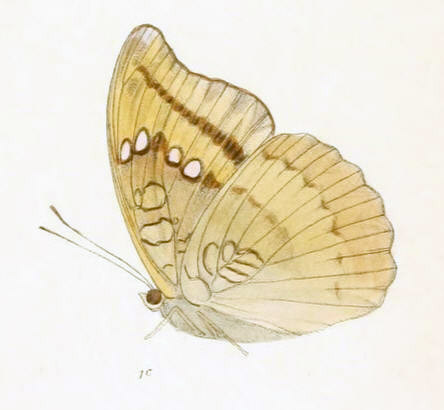
Ventral view

==== Genus: Moduza (commanders) ====
===== Moduza procris (commander) =====
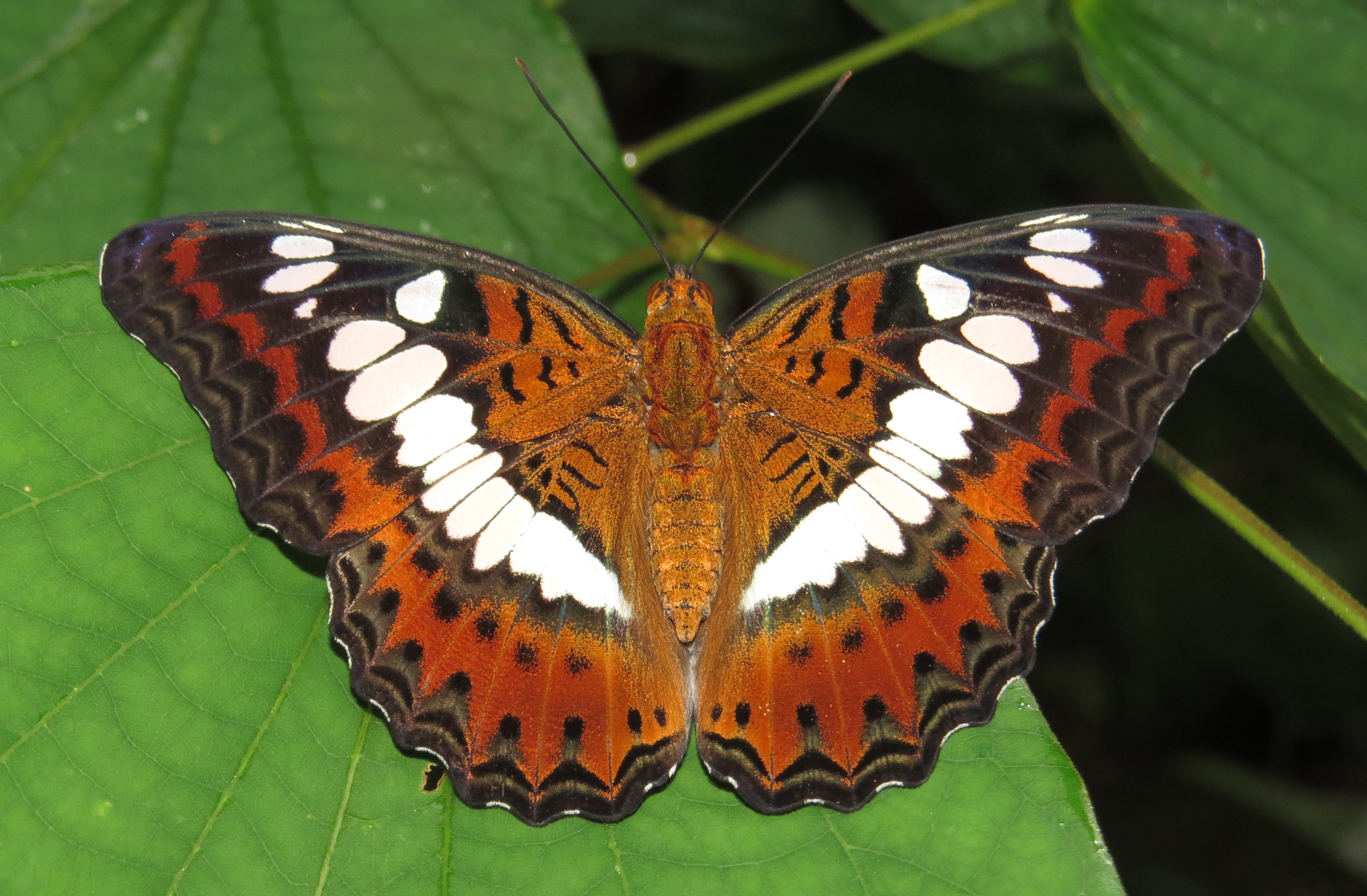
Dorsal view

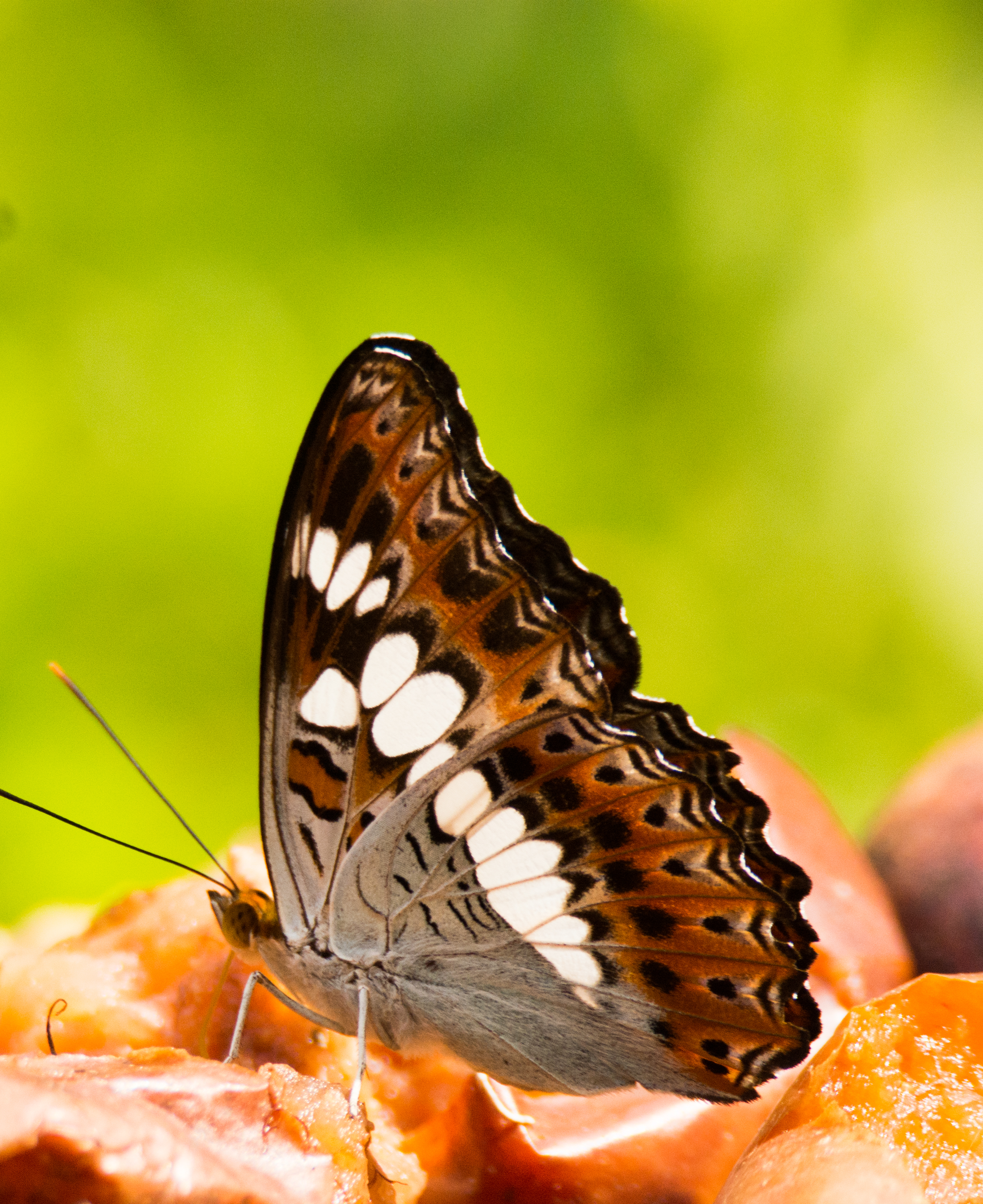
Ventral view

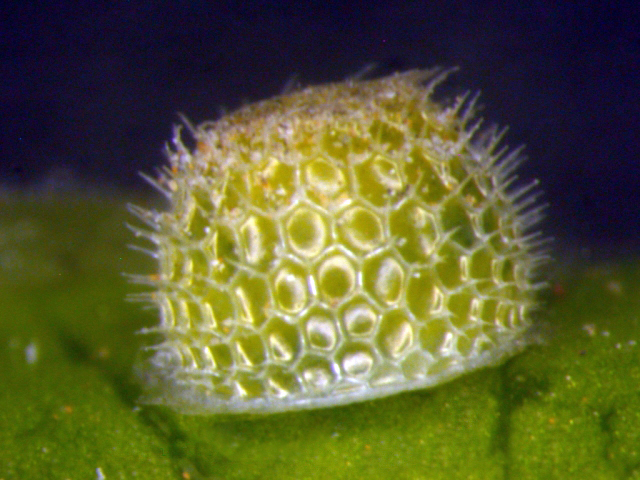
Egg

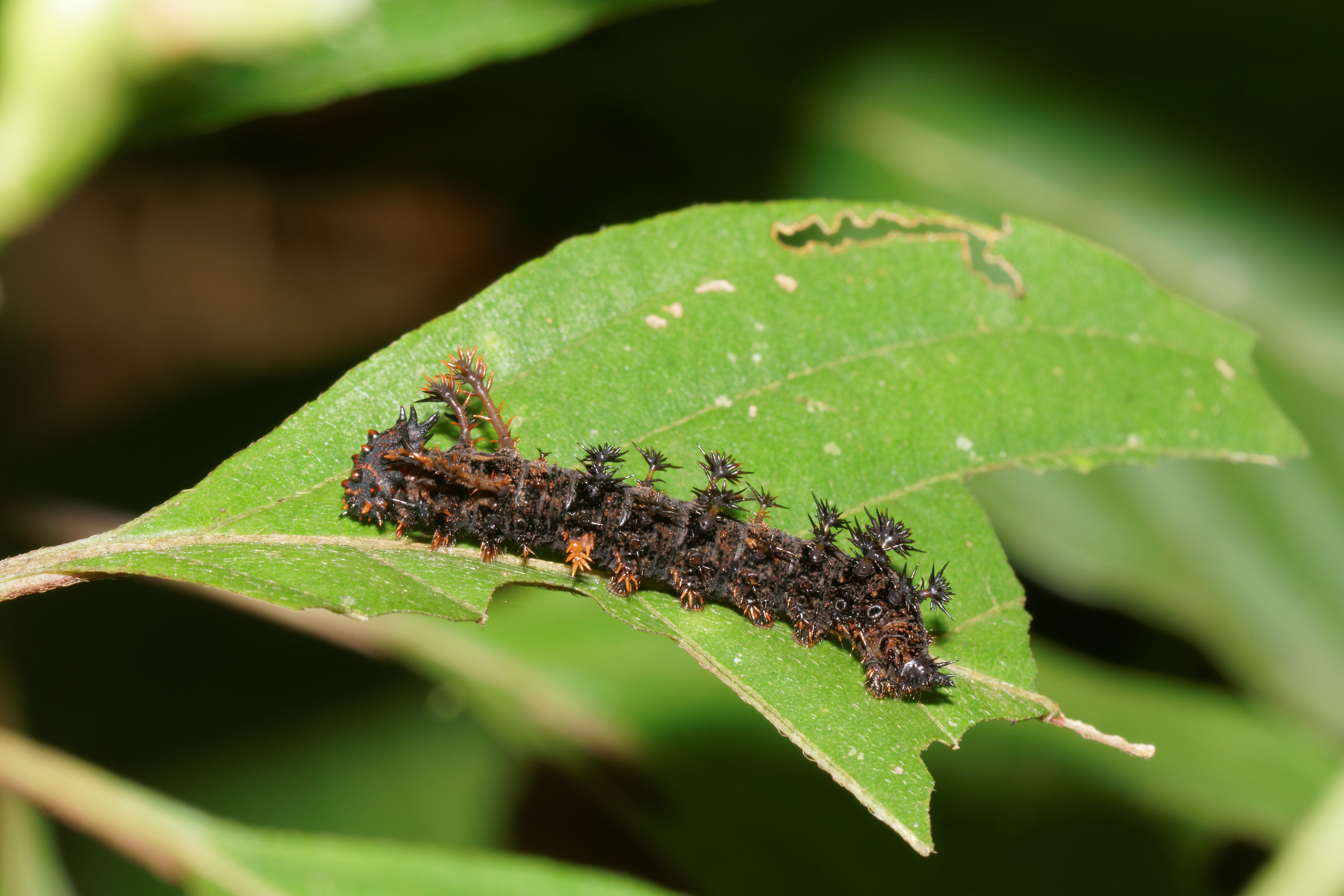
Larva

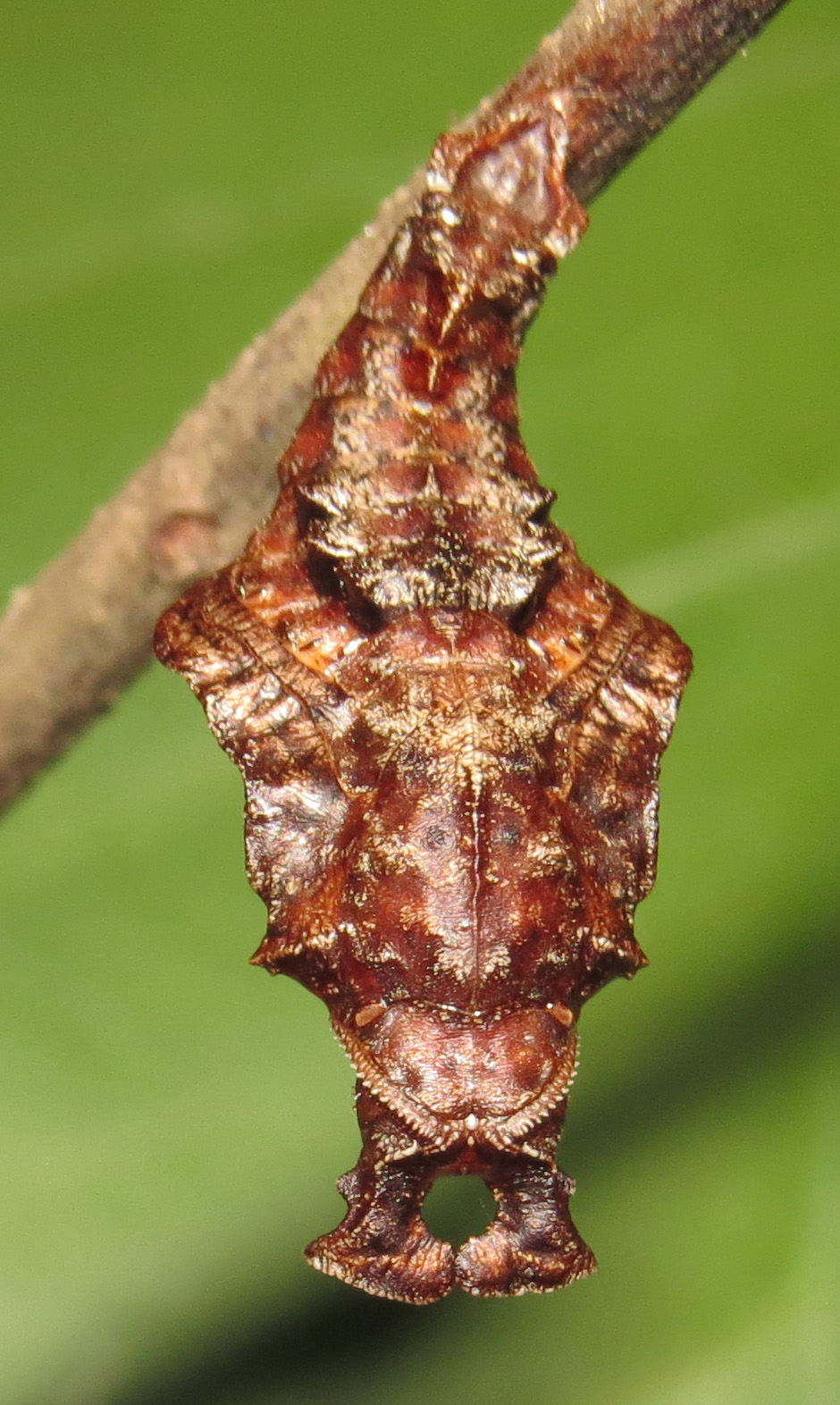
Pupa

==== Genus: Neptis (sailers) ====
===== Neptis clinia (clear sailer) =====
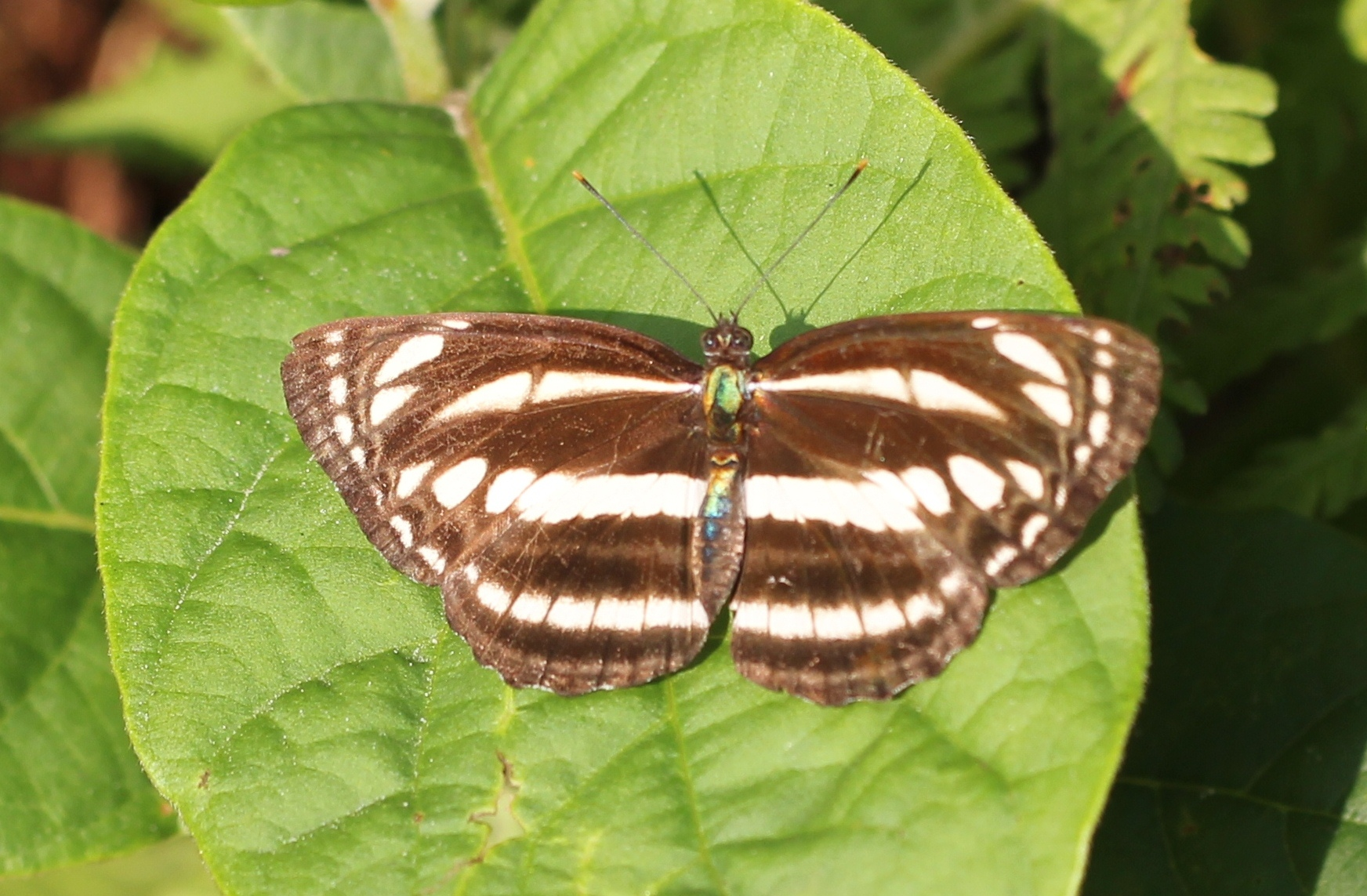
Dorsal view

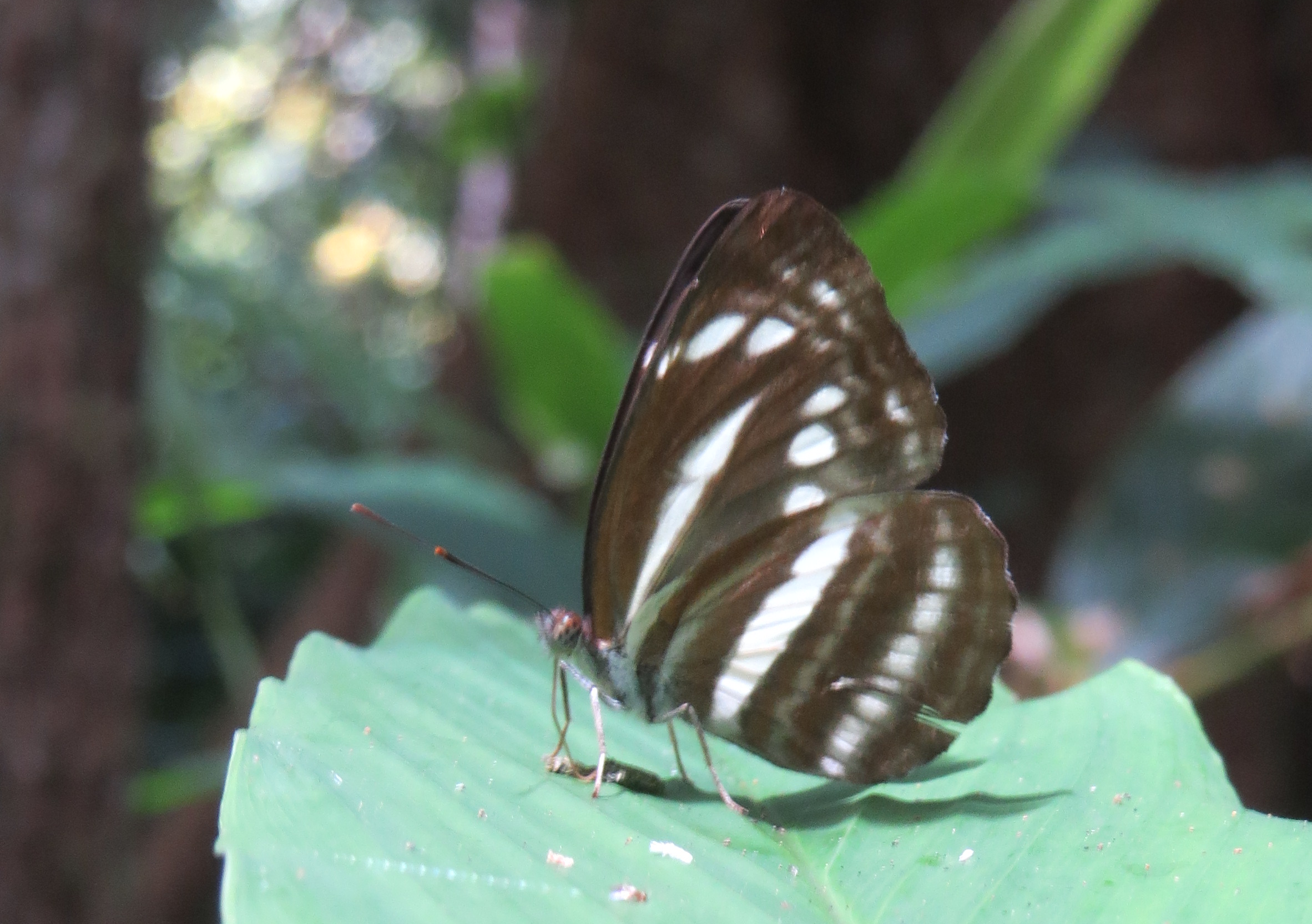
Ventral view

===== Neptis/Phaedyma columella (shortbanded sailer) =====
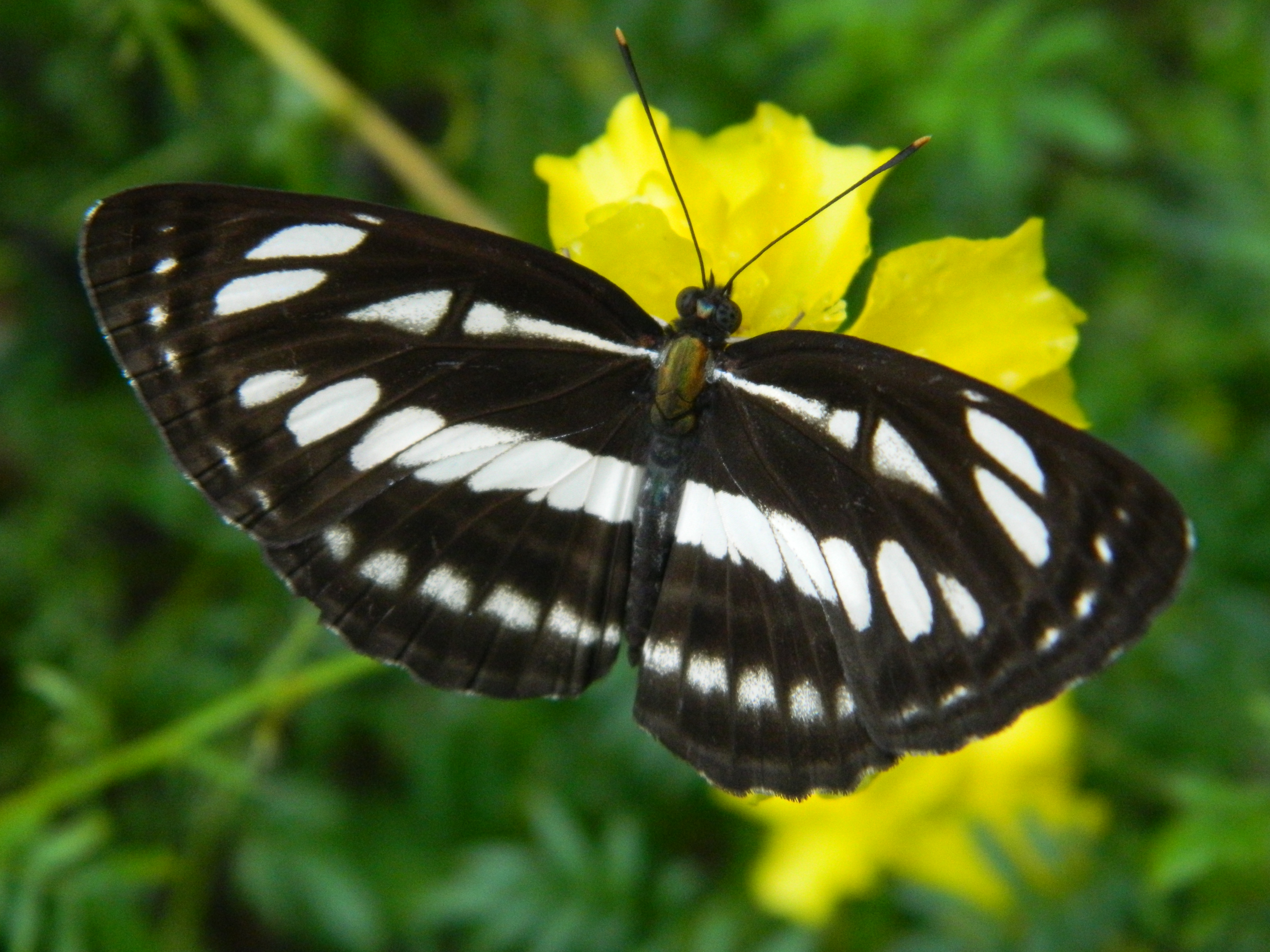
Dorsal view

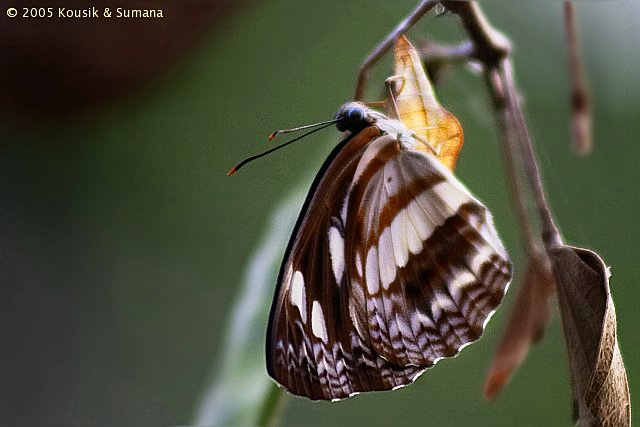
Ventral view

===== Neptis hylas (common sailer) =====
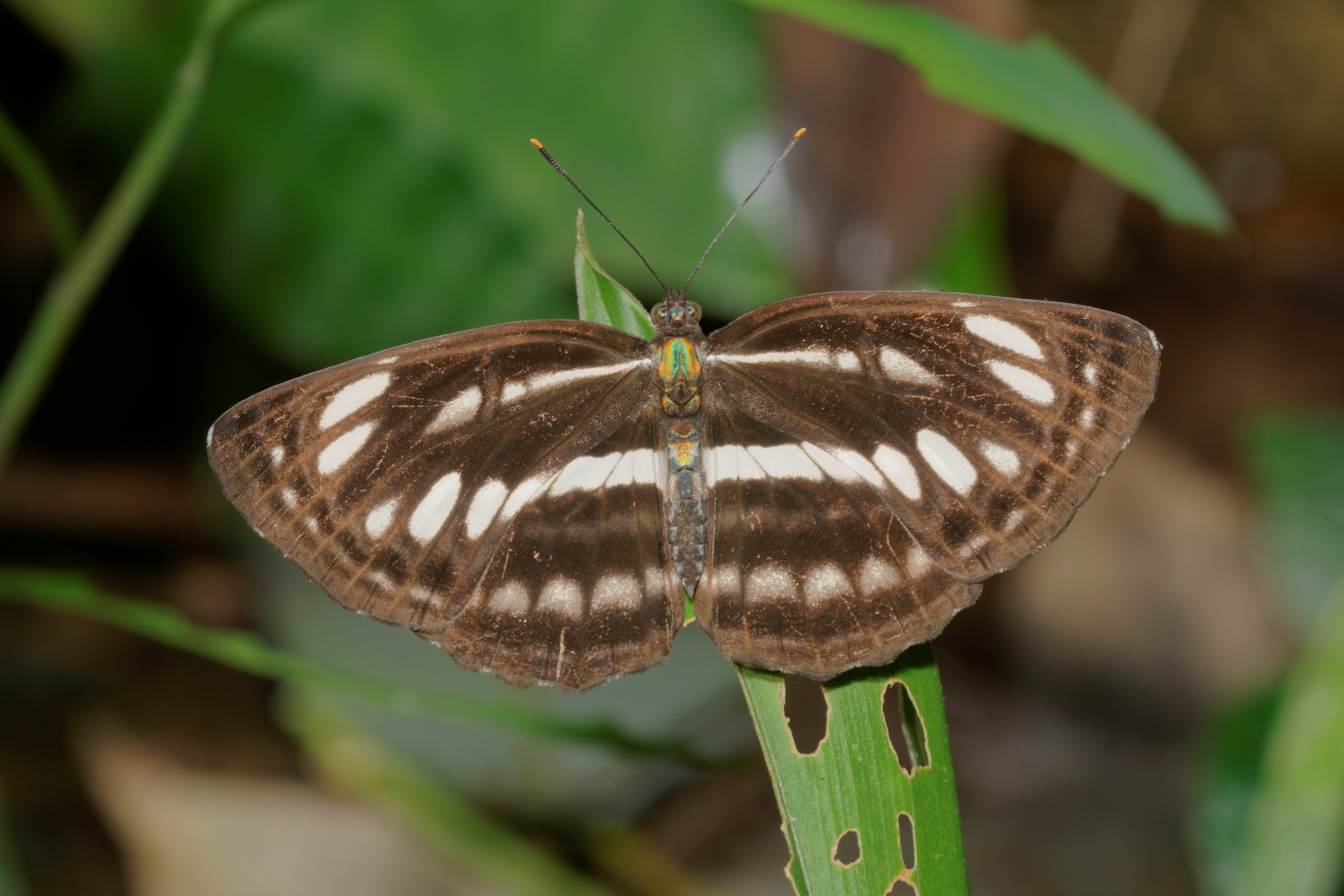
Dorsal view

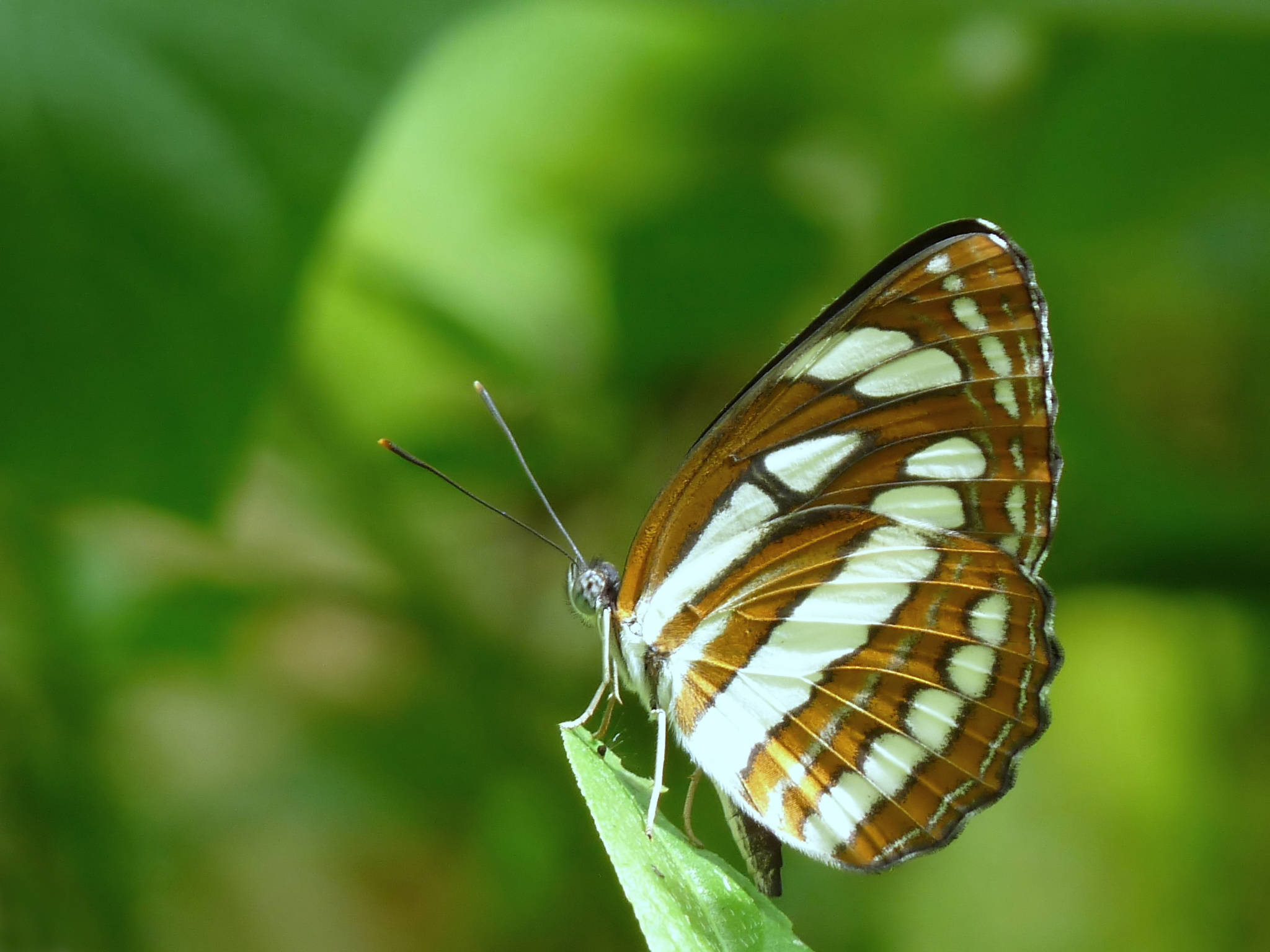
Ventral view

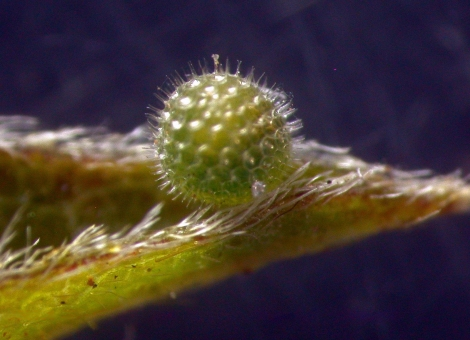
Egg

===== Neptis jumbah (chestnut-streaked sailer) =====
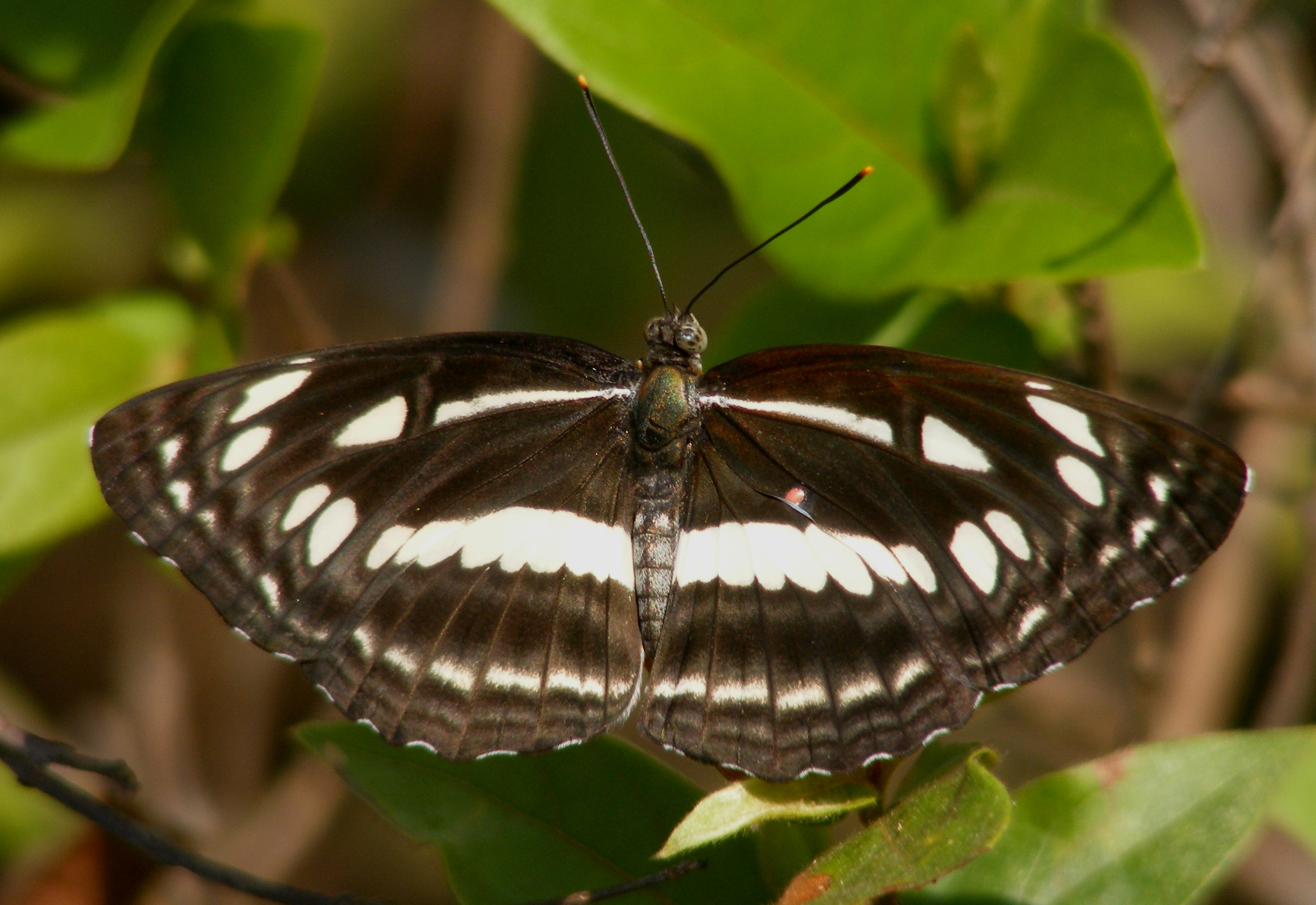
Dorsal view

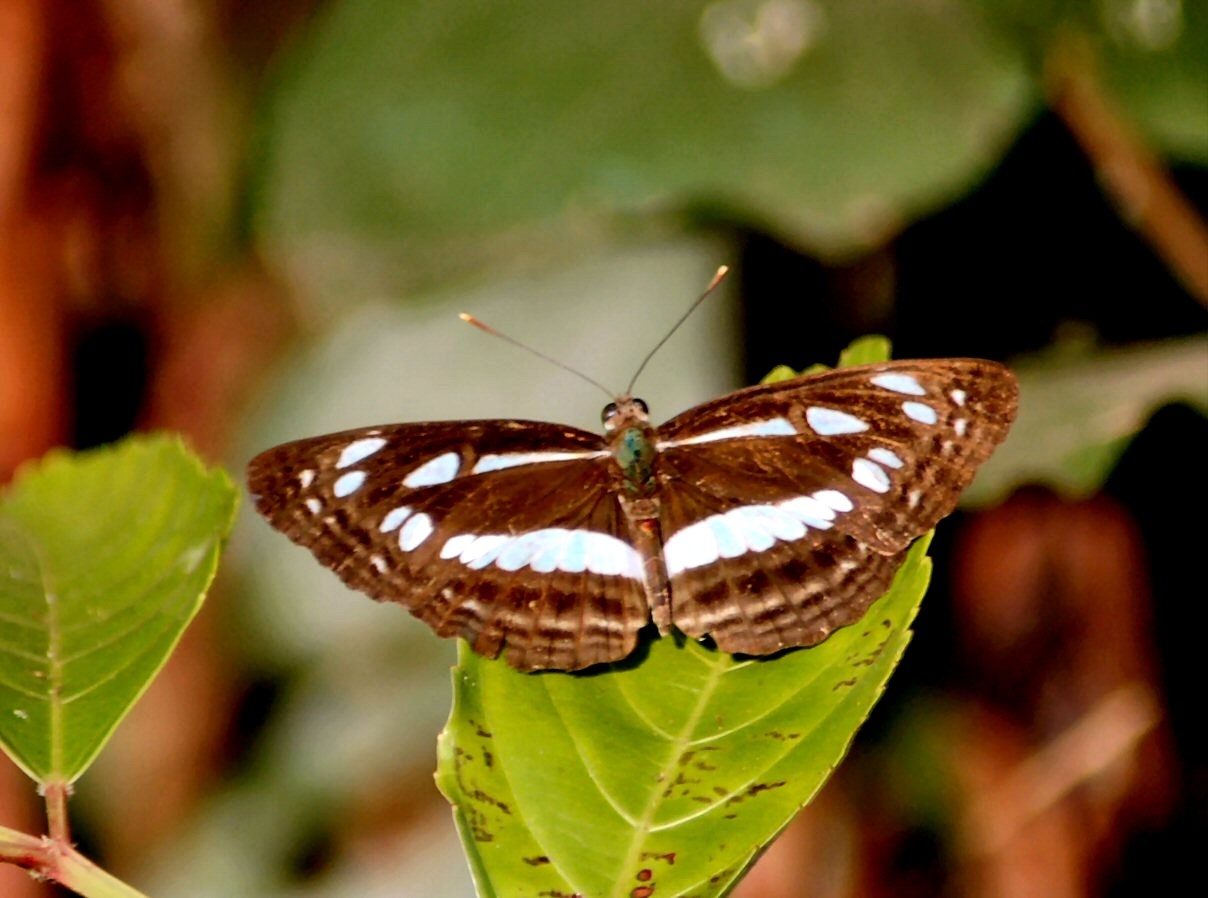
Dorsal view

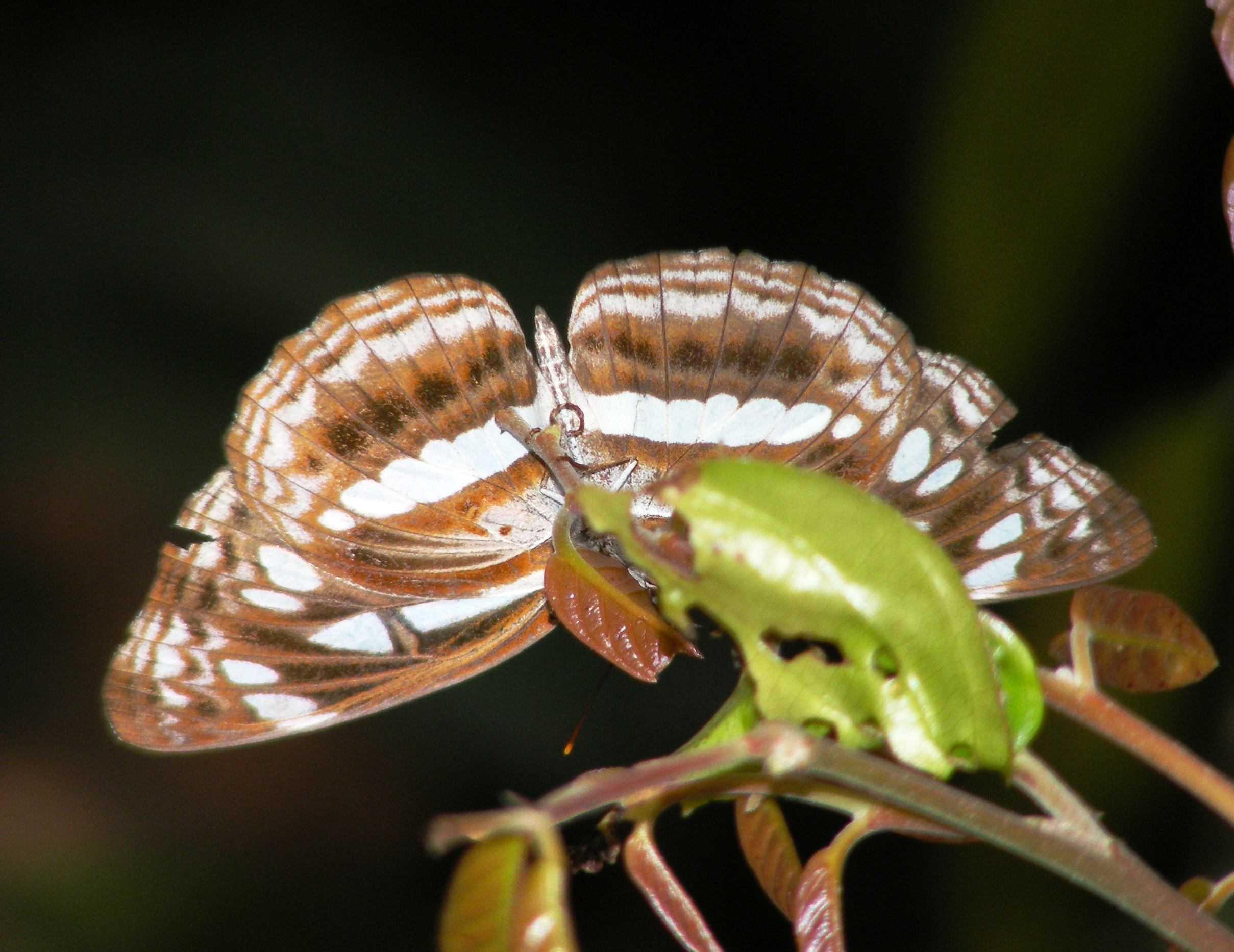
Ventral view

===== Neptis nata (sullied sailer) =====
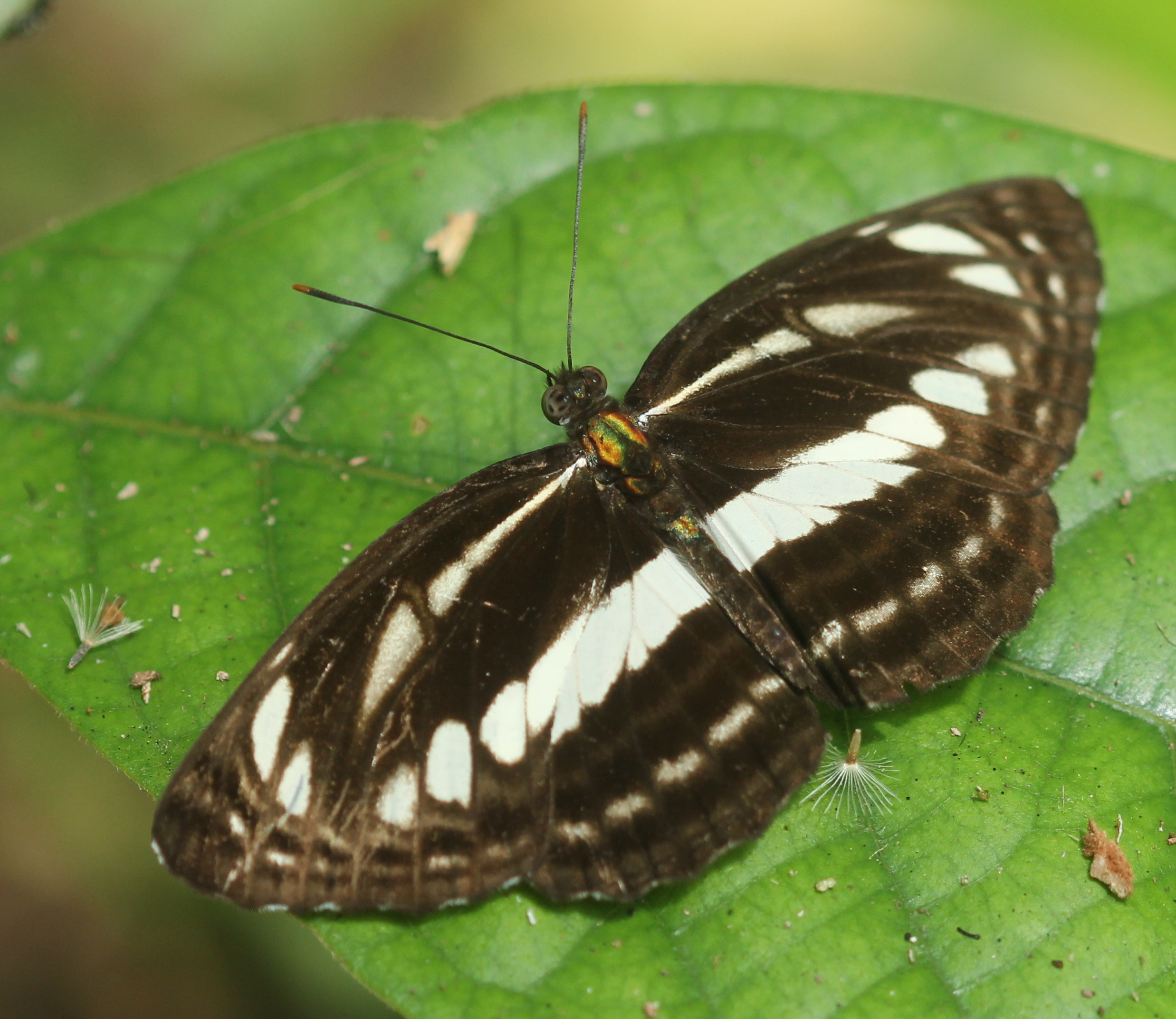
Dorsal view

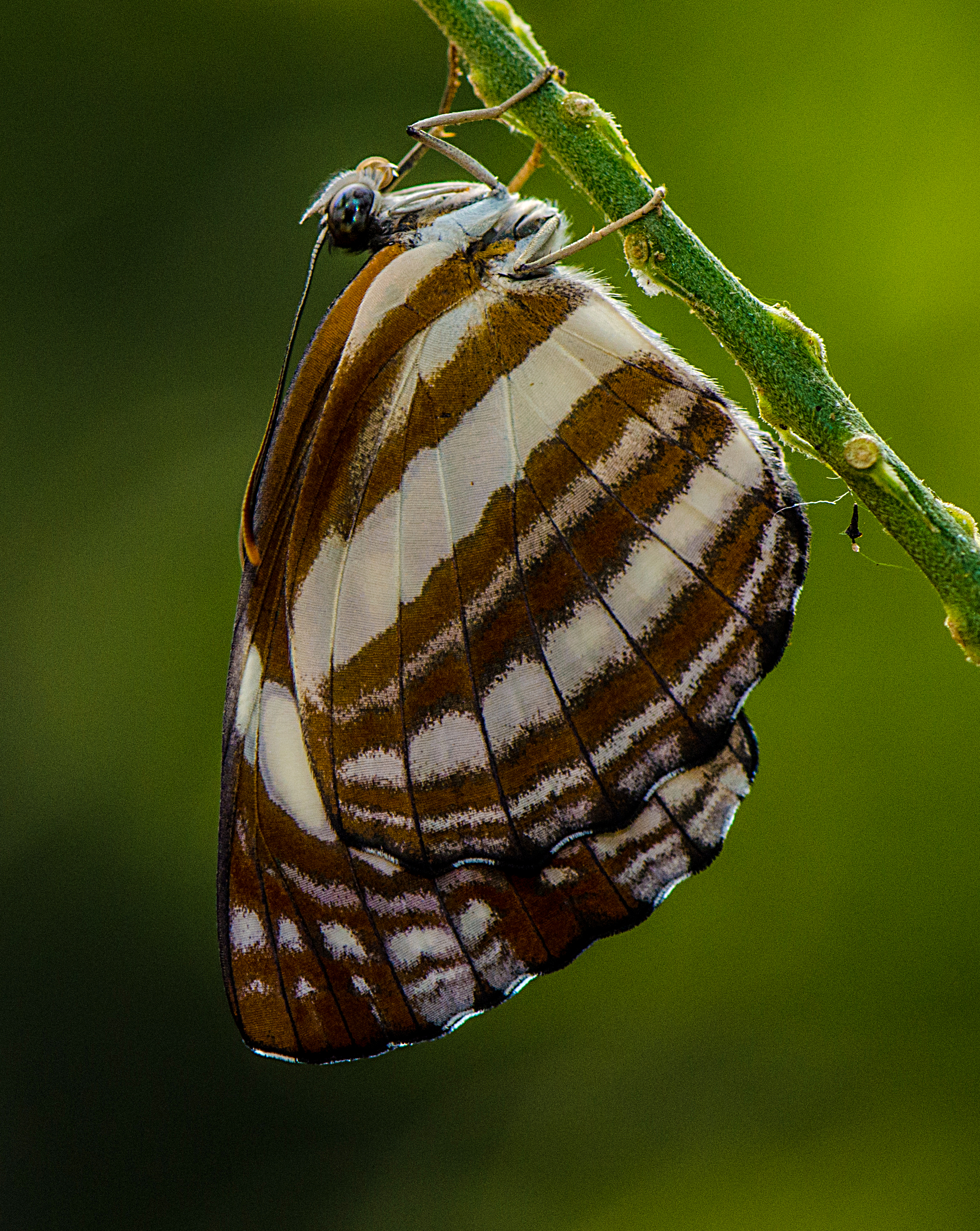
Ventral view

===== Neptis soma (creamy sailer) =====
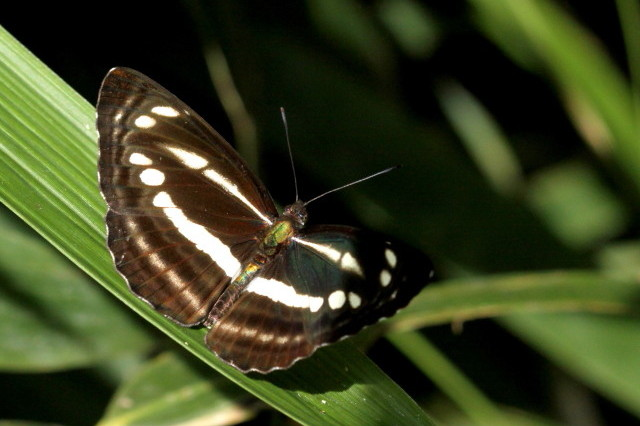
Dorsal view

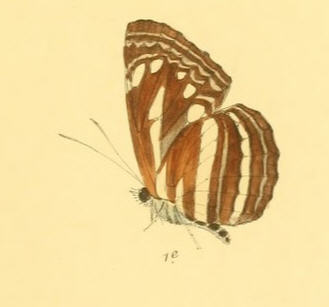
Ventral view

===== Neptis/Lasippa viraja (yellowjack sailer) =====
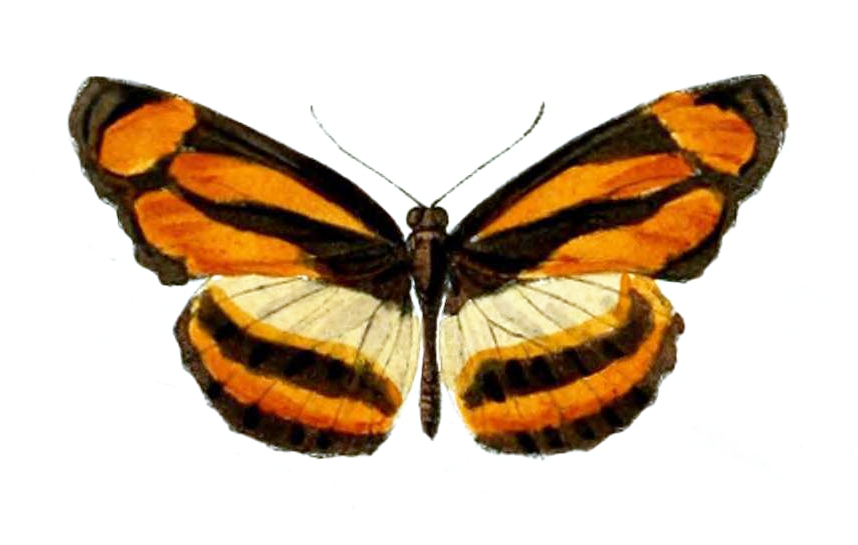
Illustration

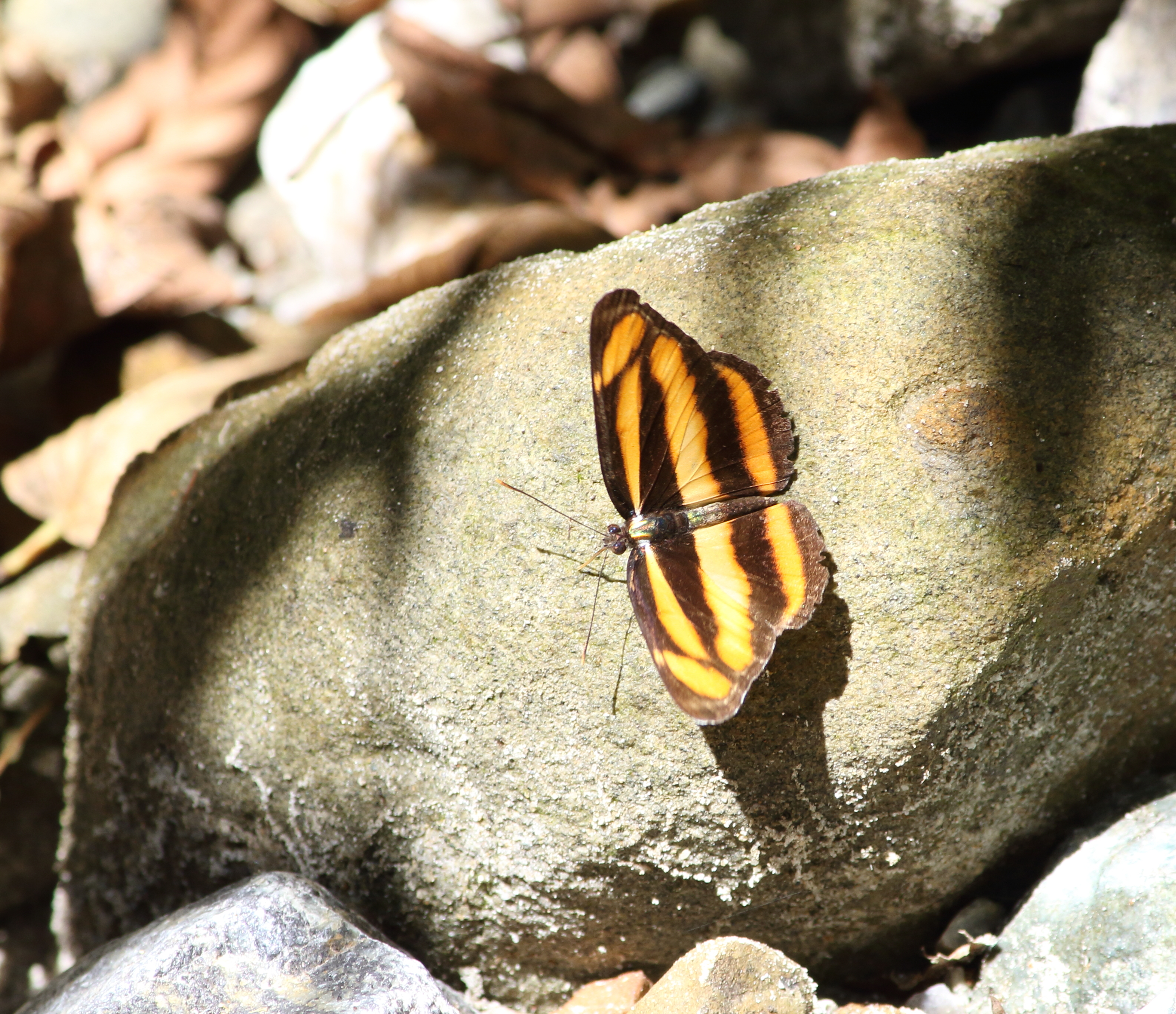
Dorsal view

==== Genus: Pantoporia (lascars) ====
===== Pantoporia hordonia (common lascar) =====
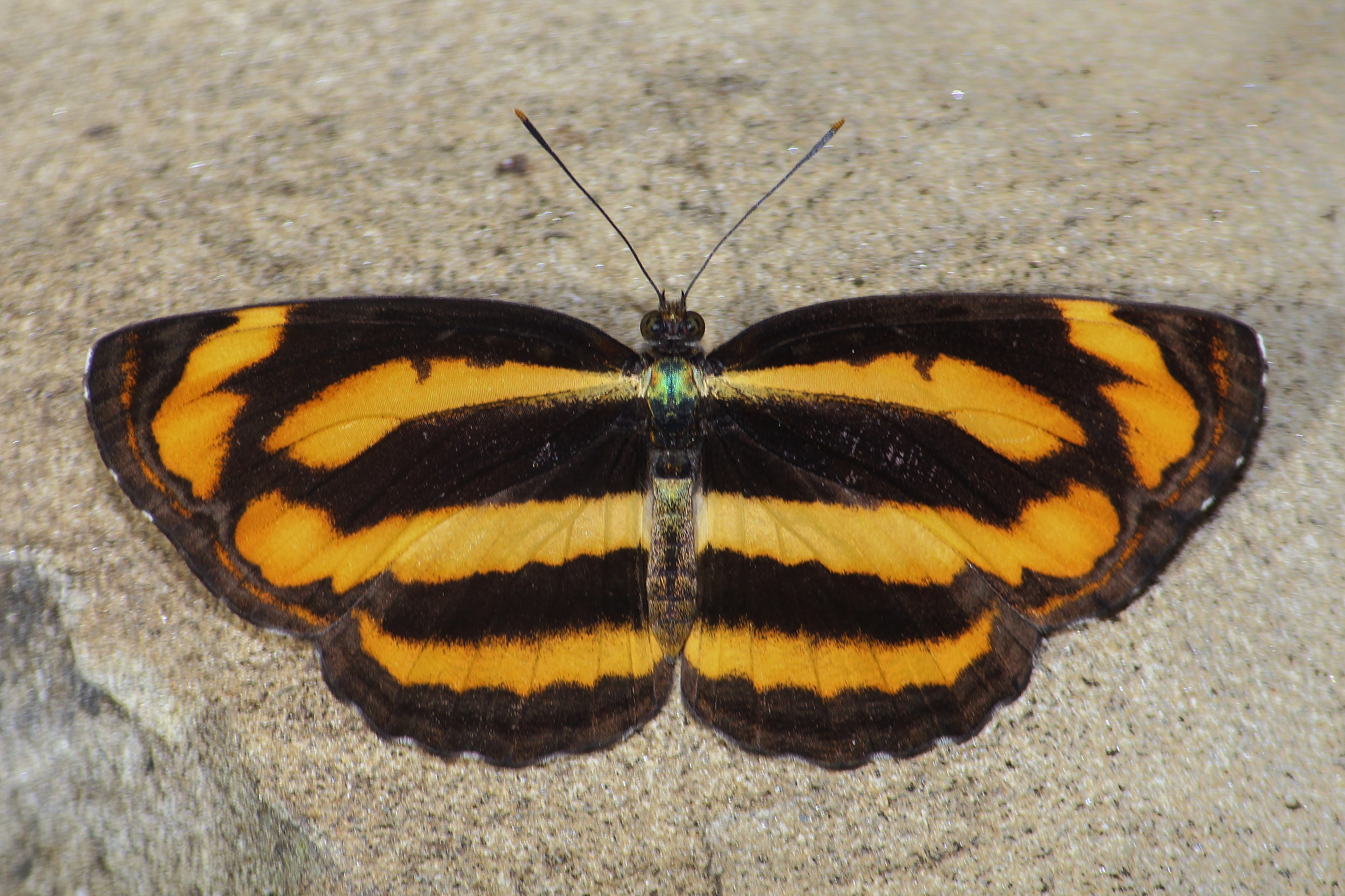
Dorsal view

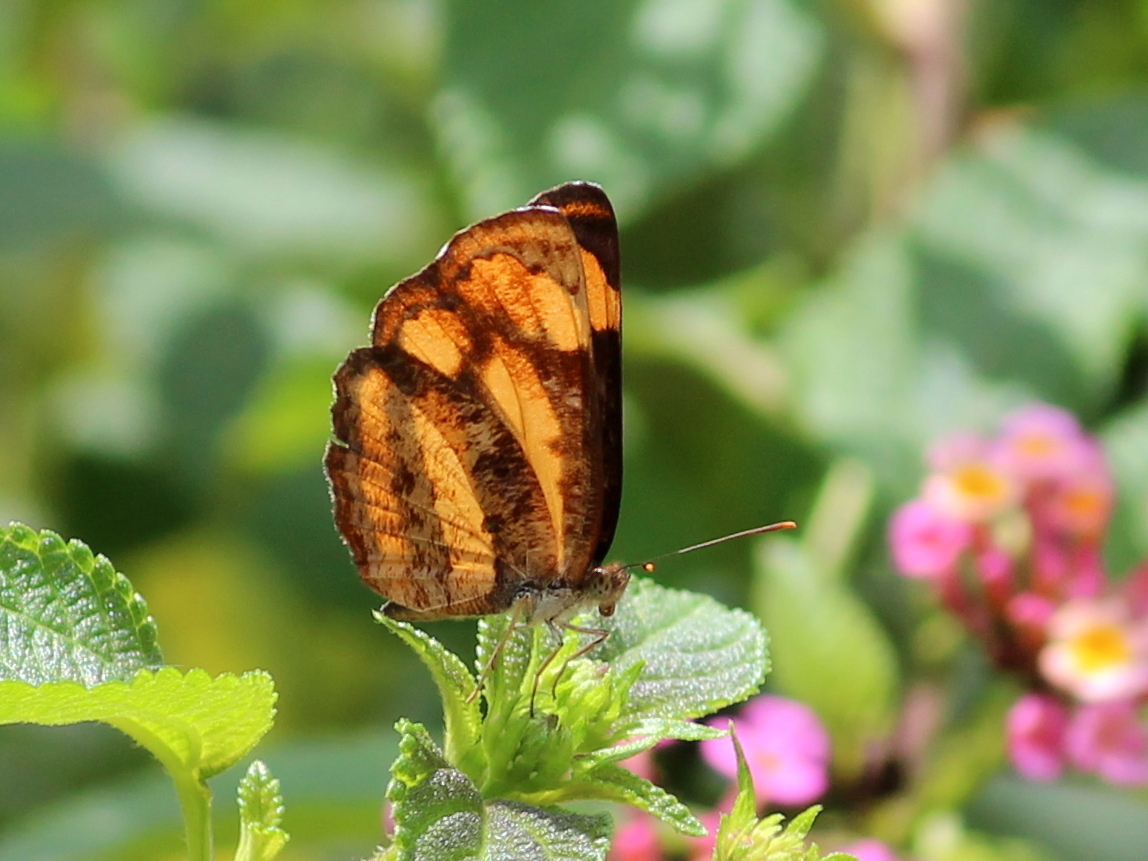
Ventral view

===== Pantoporia sandaka (extra lascar) =====
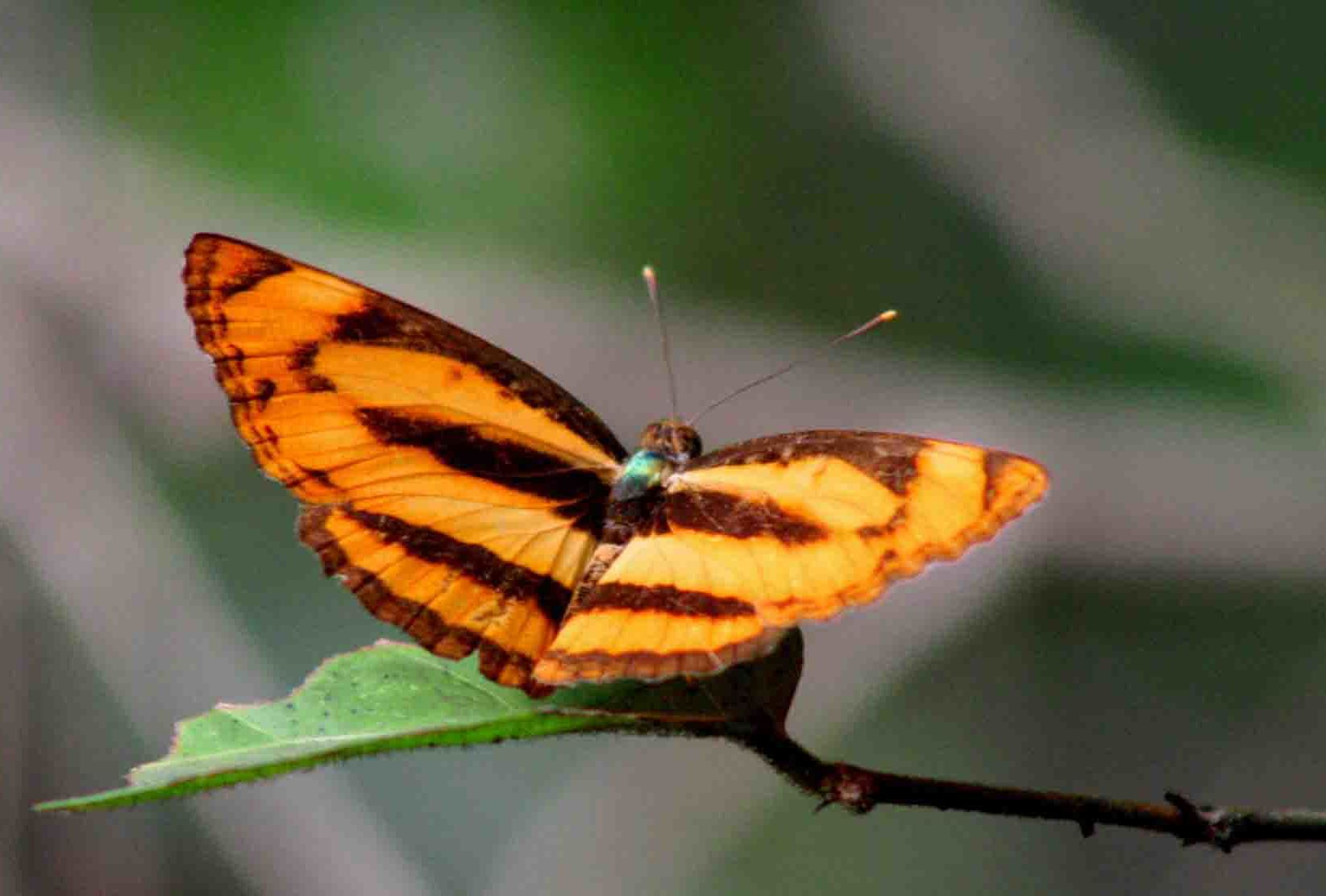
Dorsal view

==== Genus: Parthenos (clippers) ====
===== Parthenos sylvia (clipper) =====
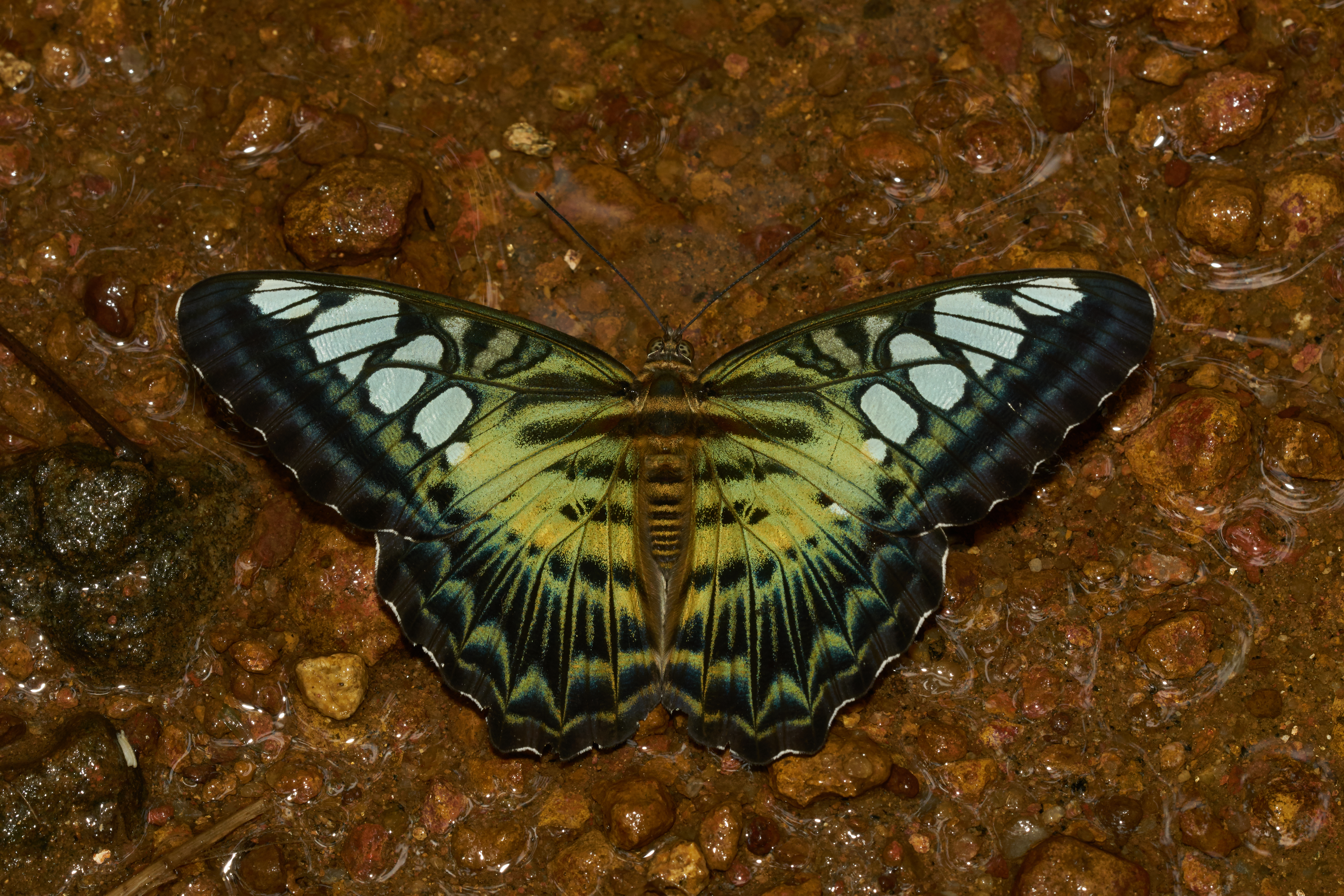
Dorsal view

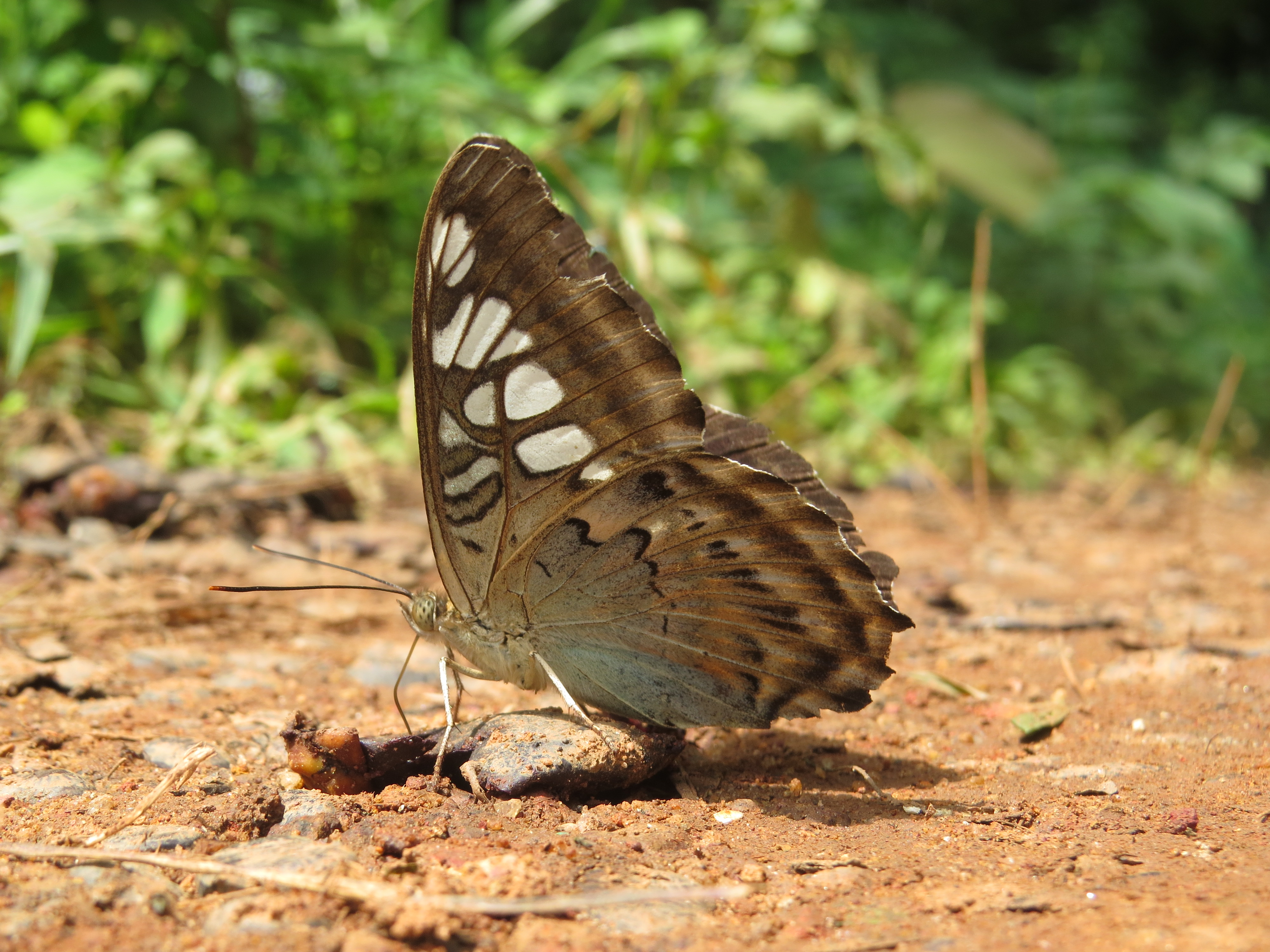
Ventral view

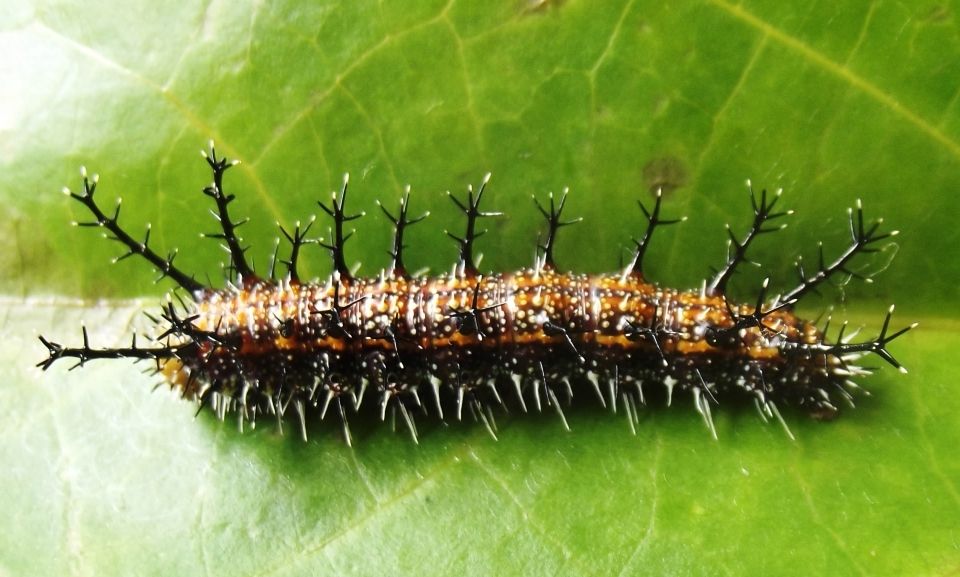
Larva

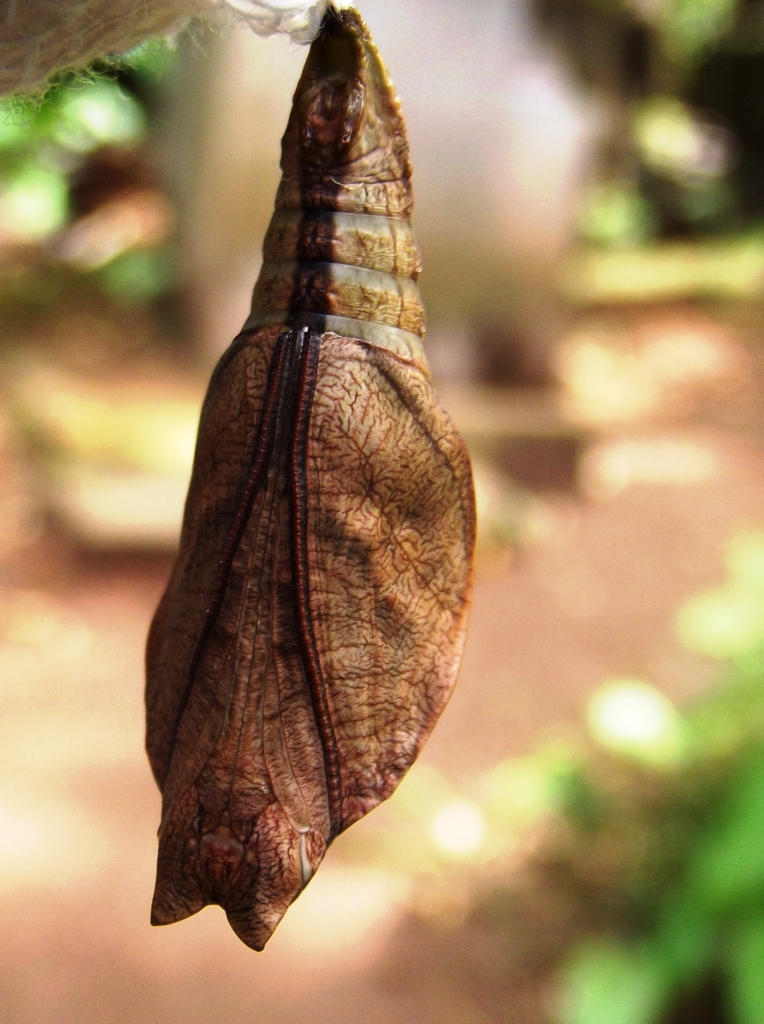
Pupa

==== Genus: Tanaecia (counts) ====
===== Tanaecia lepidea (grey count) =====
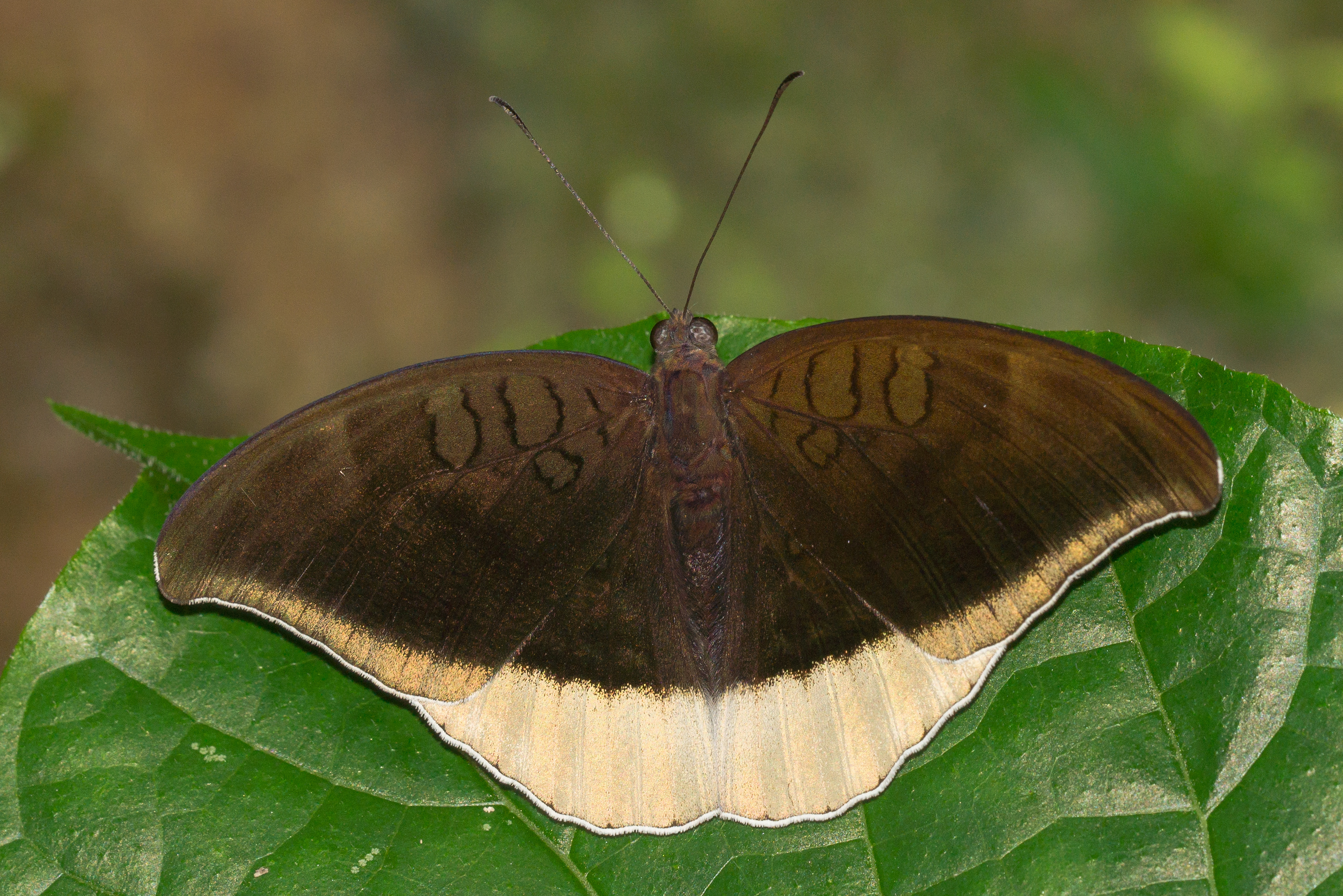
Dorsal view

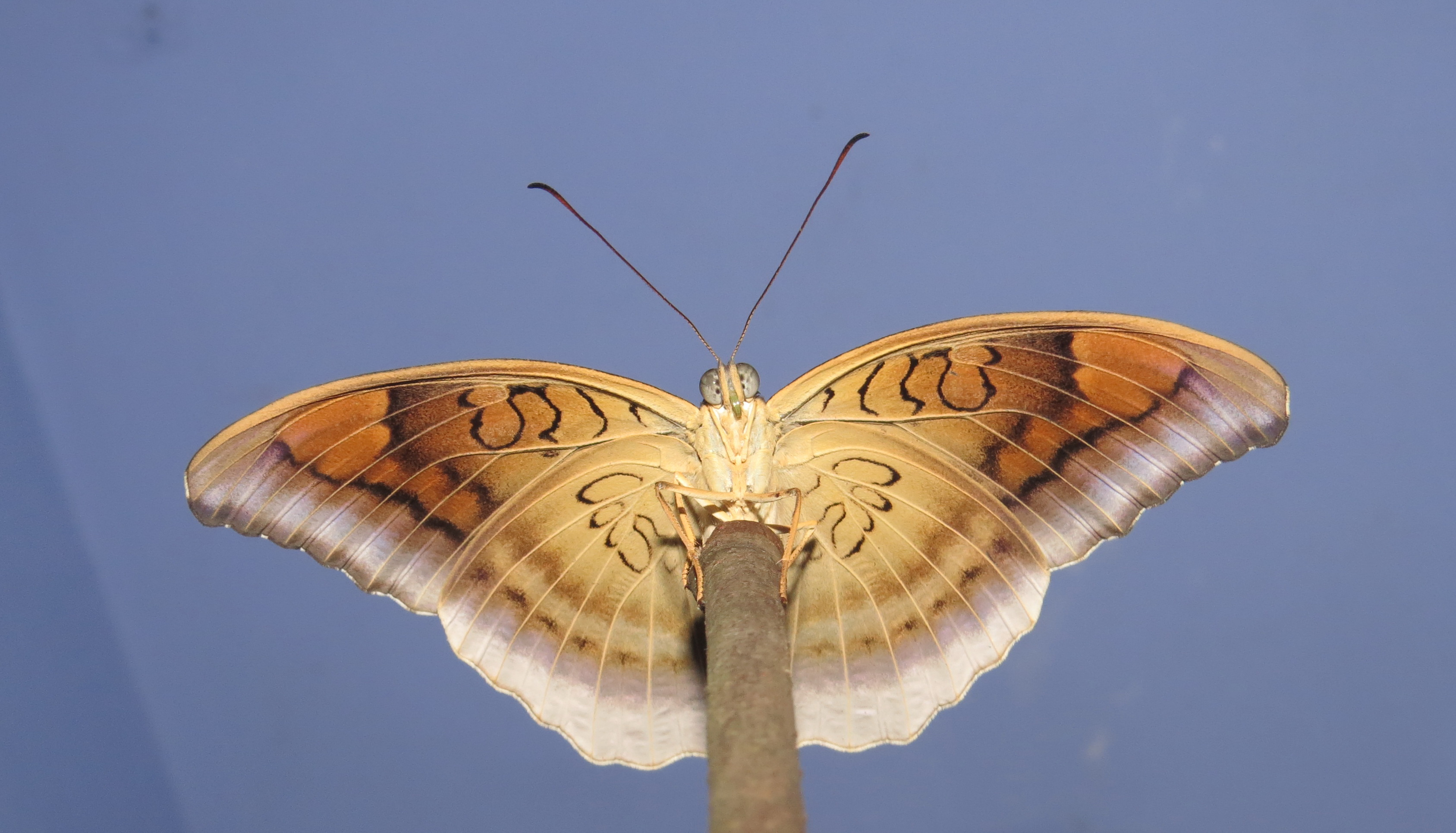
Ventral view

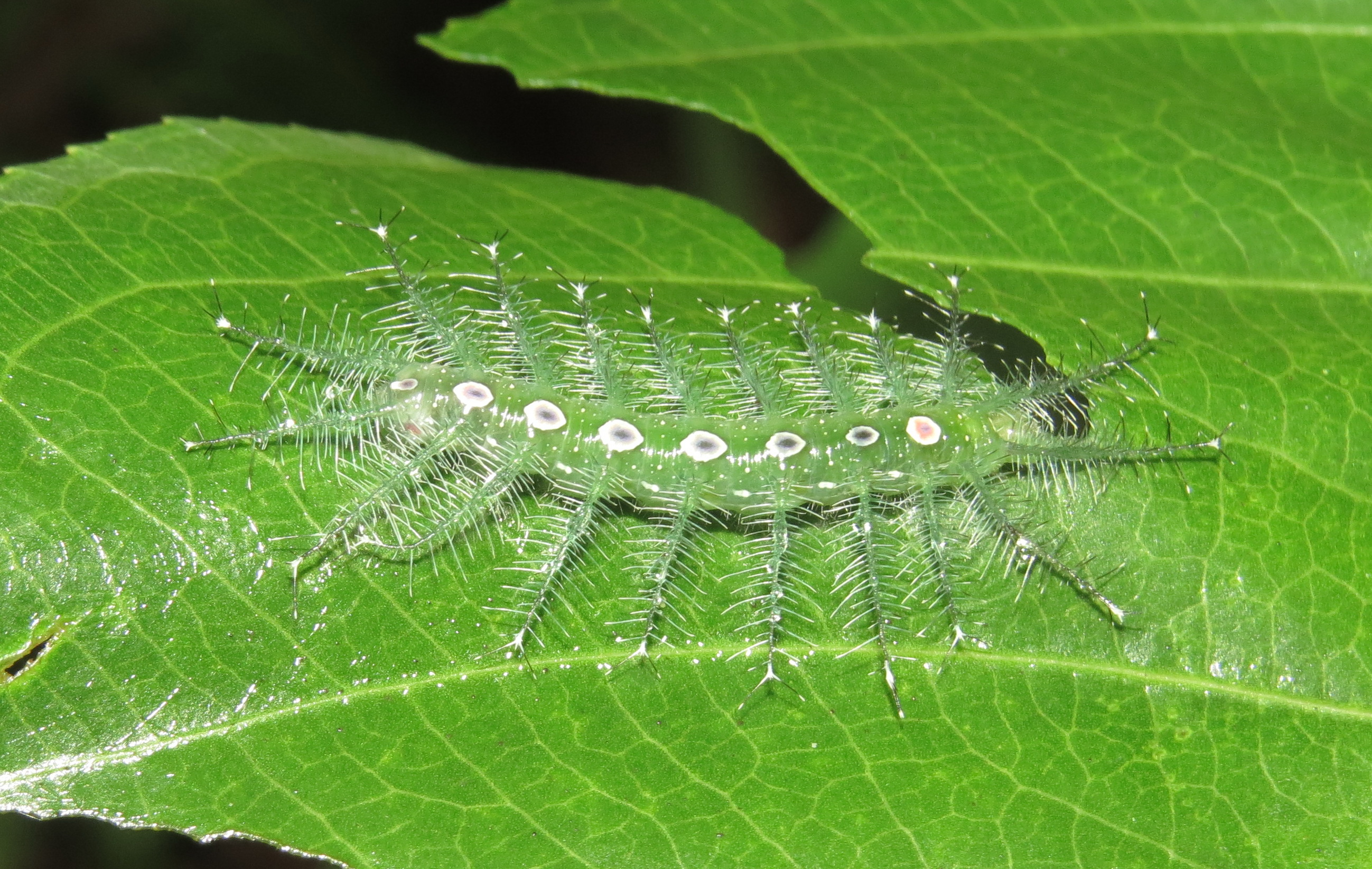
Larva

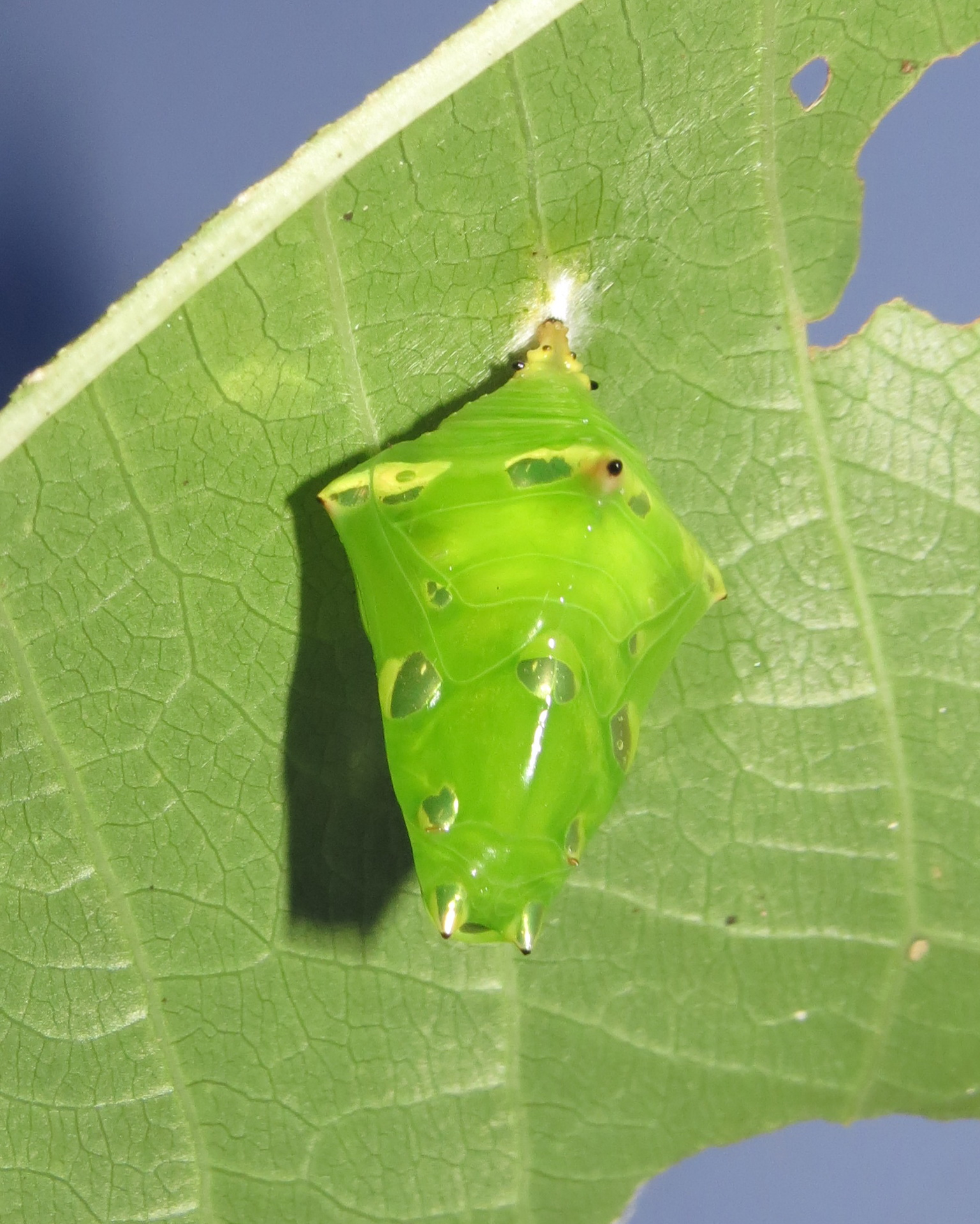
Pupa

=== Subfamily: Nymphalinae ===
==== Genus: Doleschallia (autumn leaves) ====
===== Doleschallia bisaltide (autumn leaf) =====
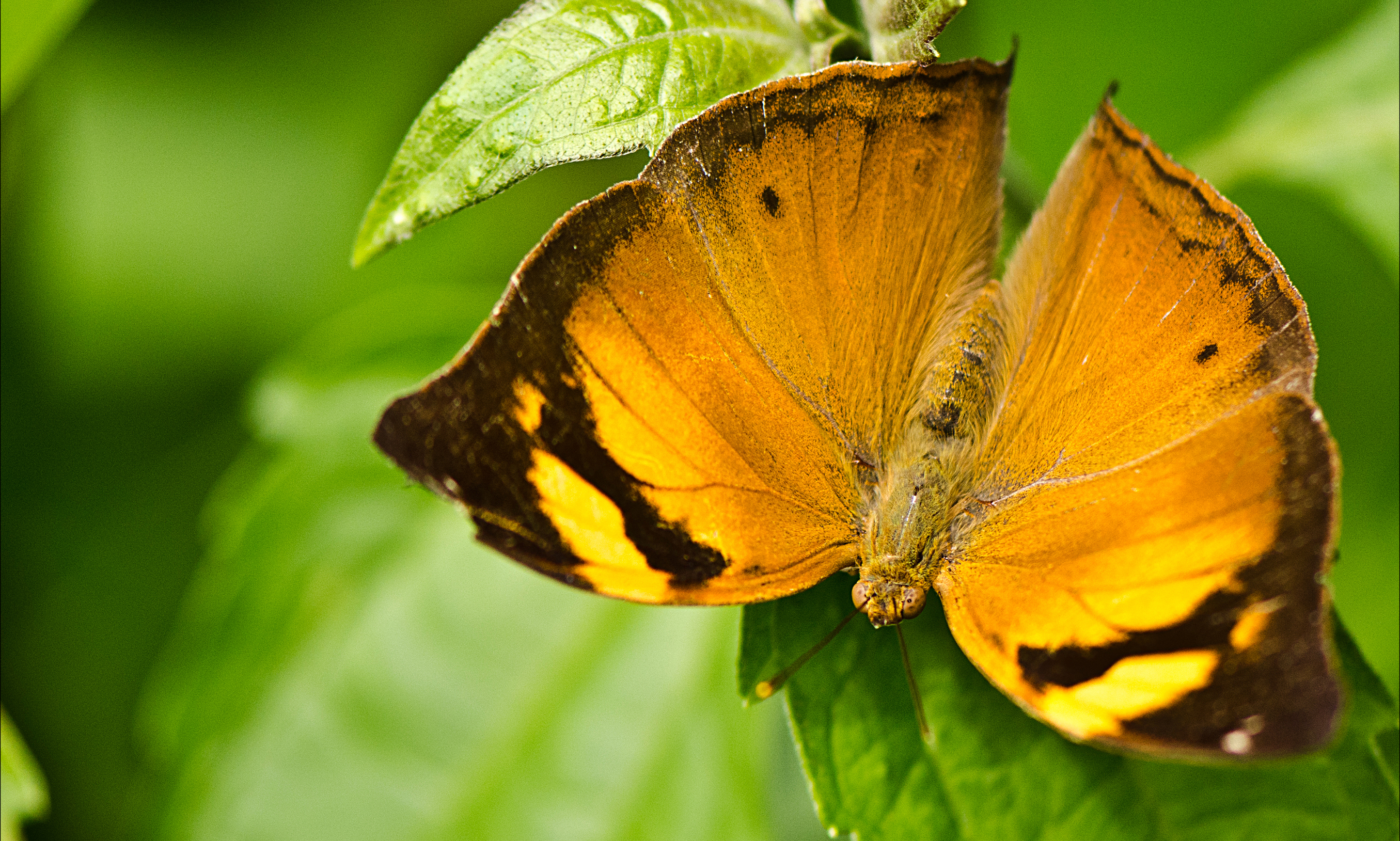
Dorsal view

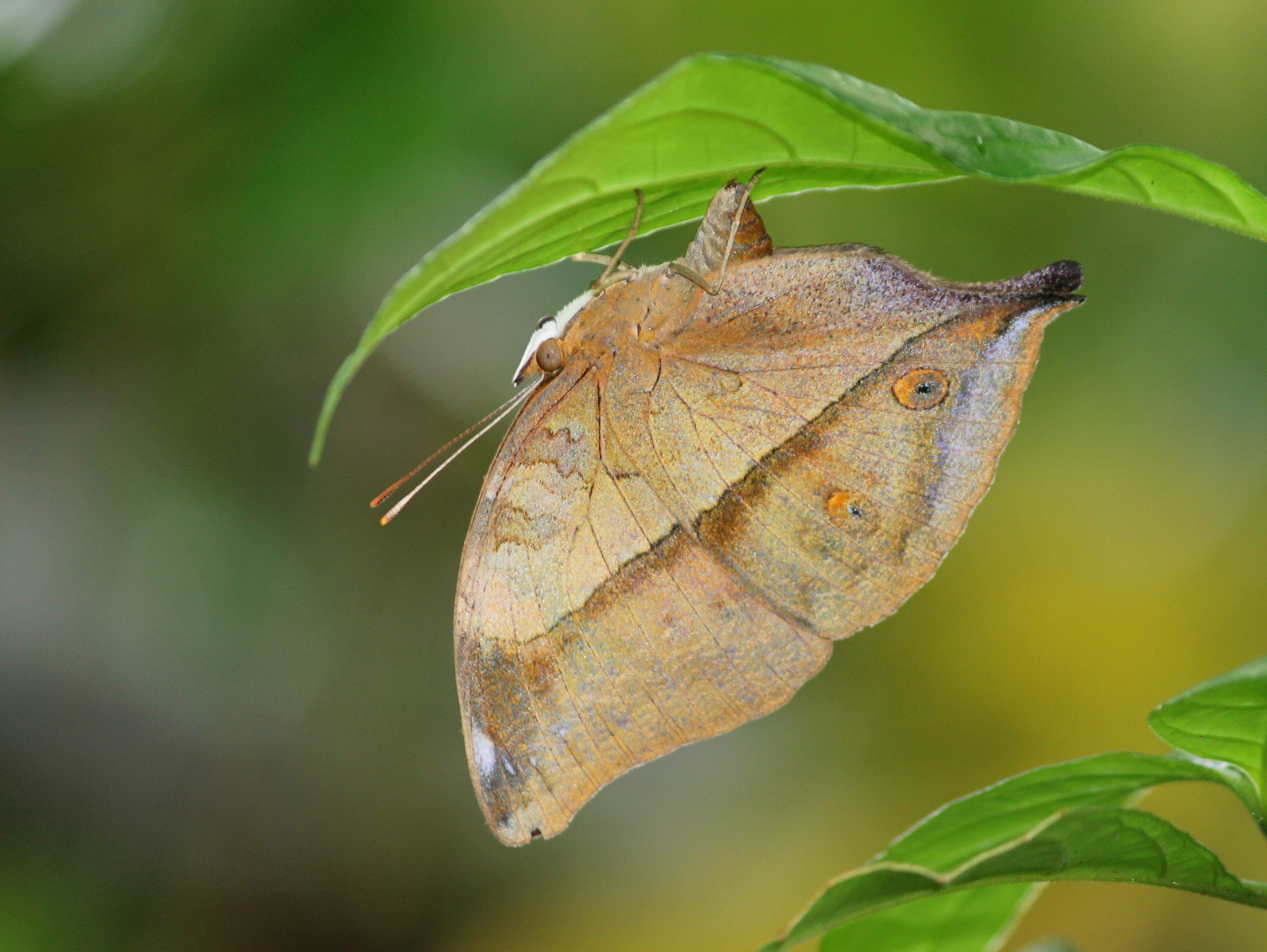
Ventral view

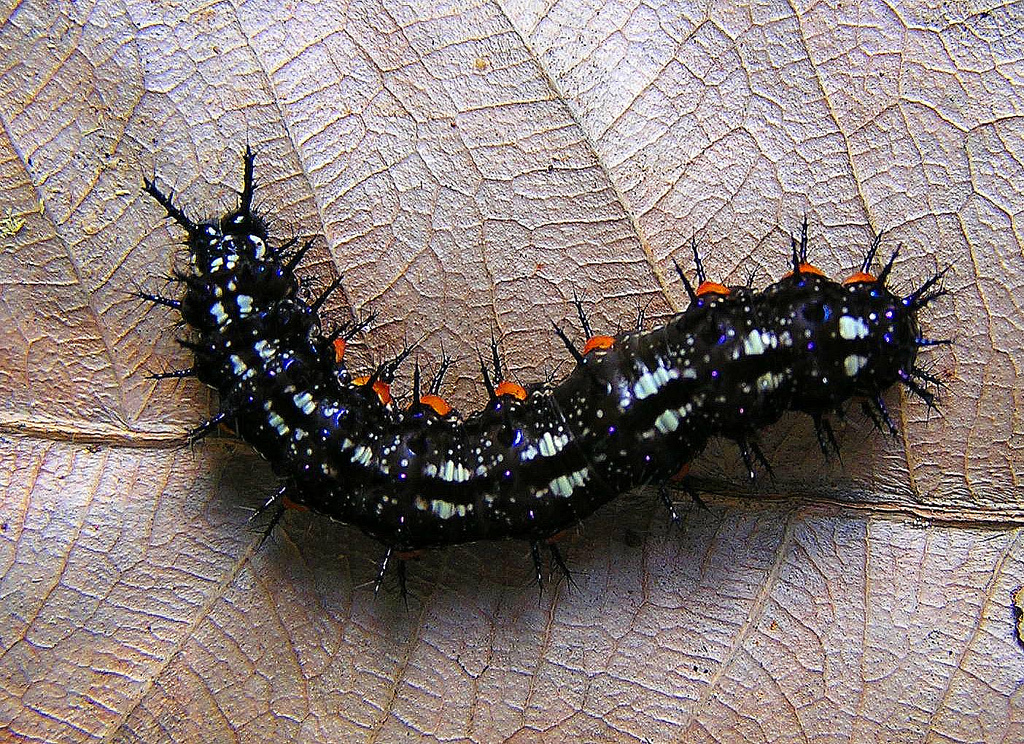
Larva

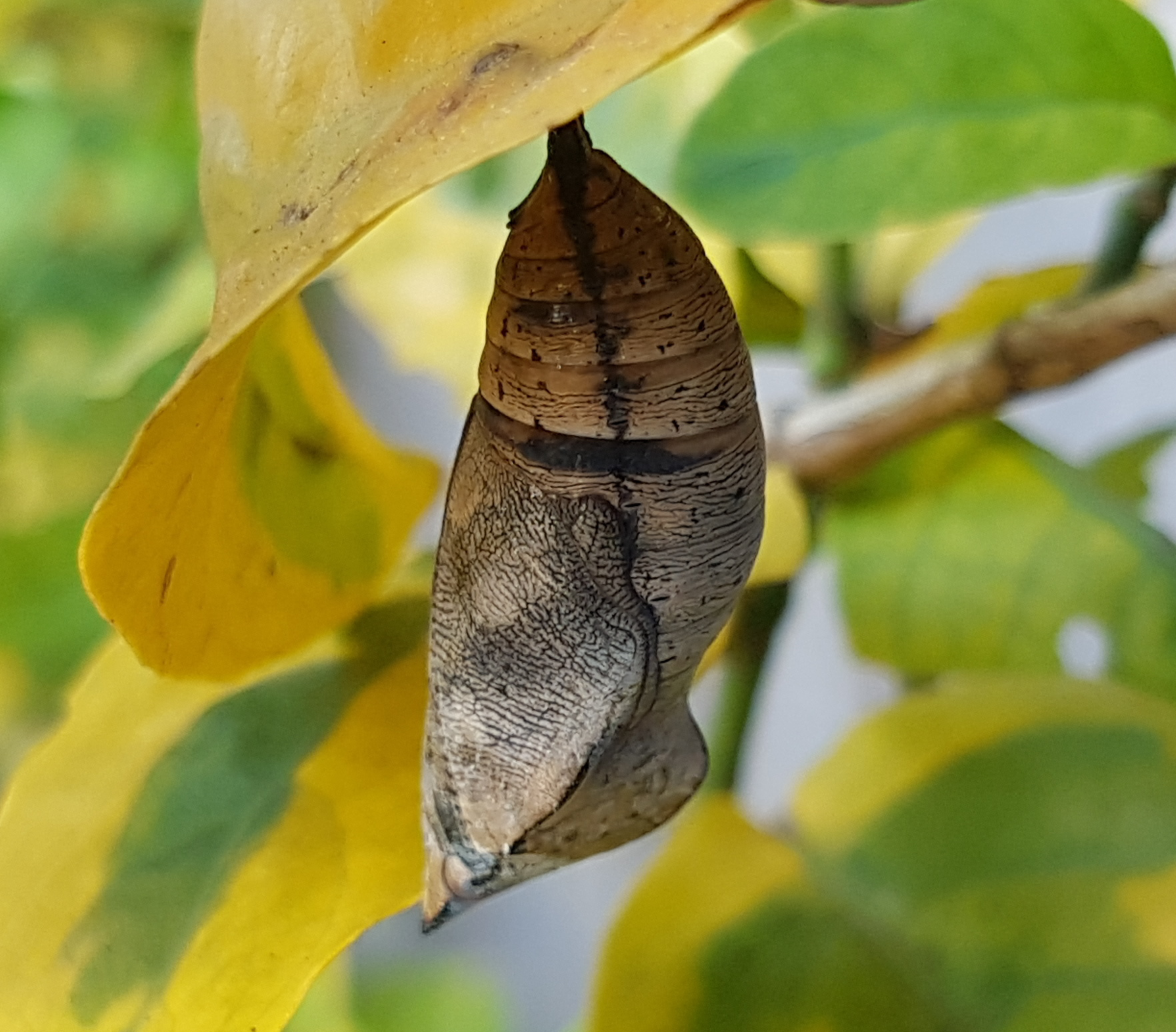
Pupa

==== Genus: Hypolimnas (eggflies) ====
===== Hypolimnas bolina (great eggfly) =====
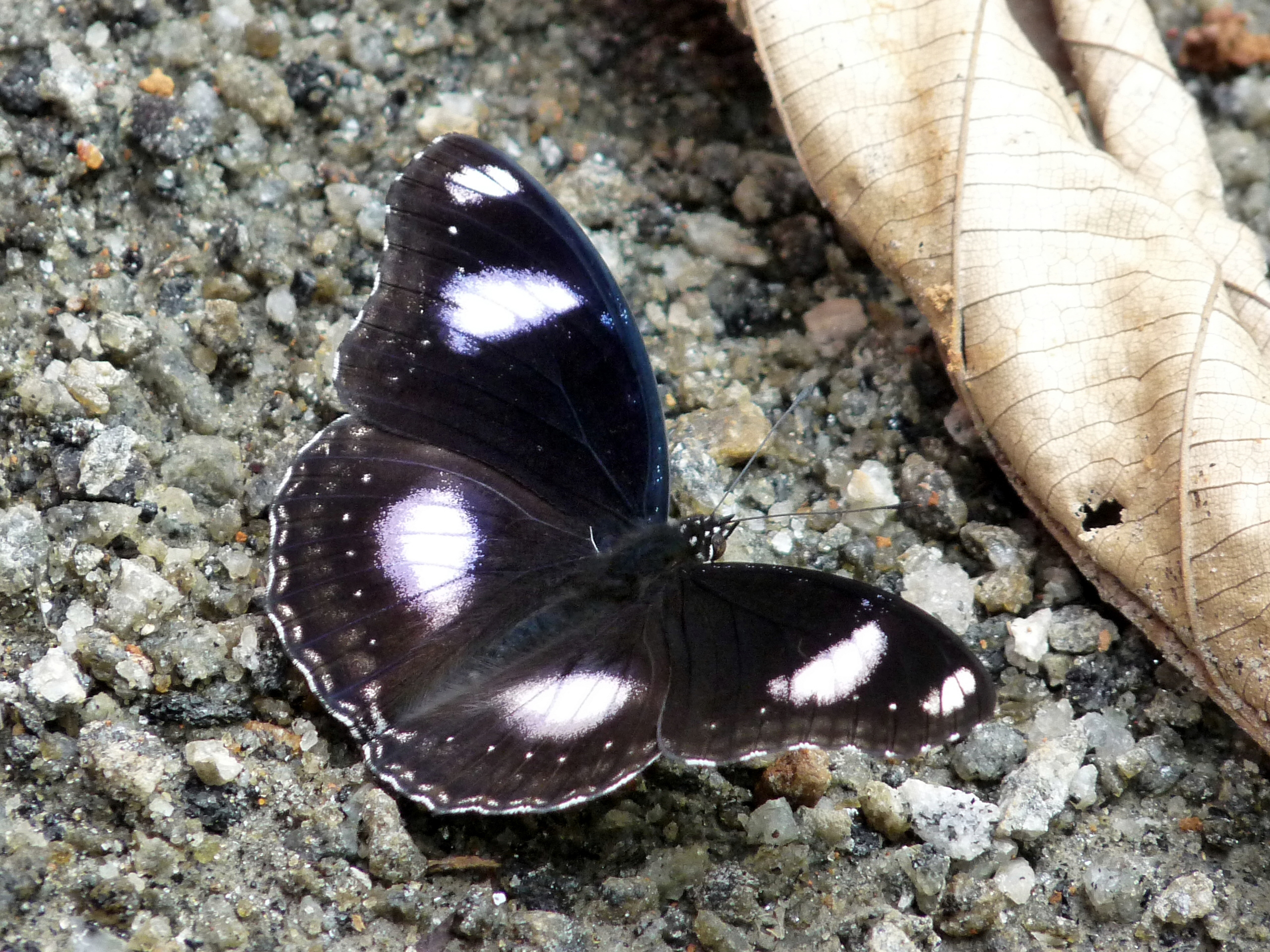
Dorsal view (male)

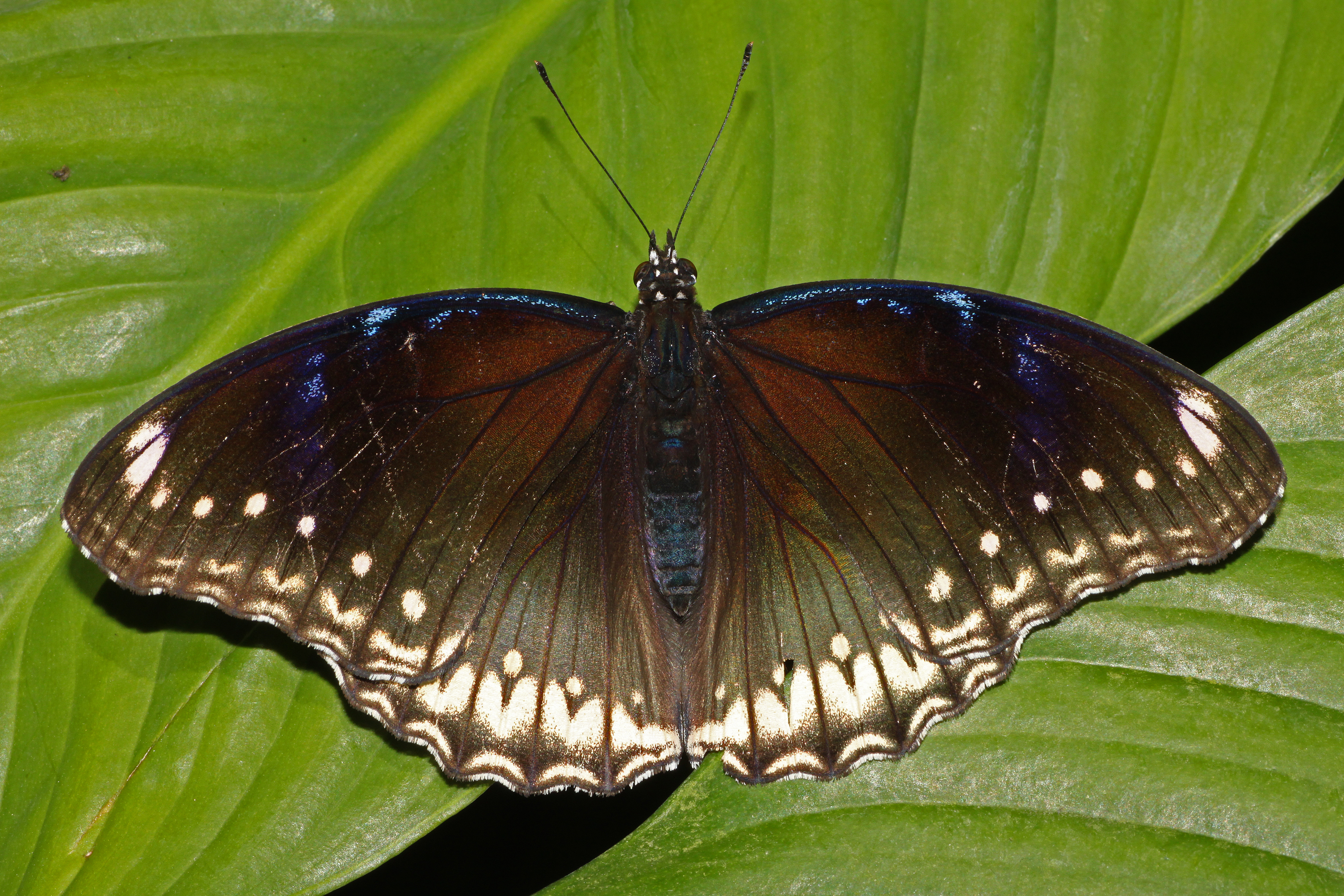
Dorsal view (female)

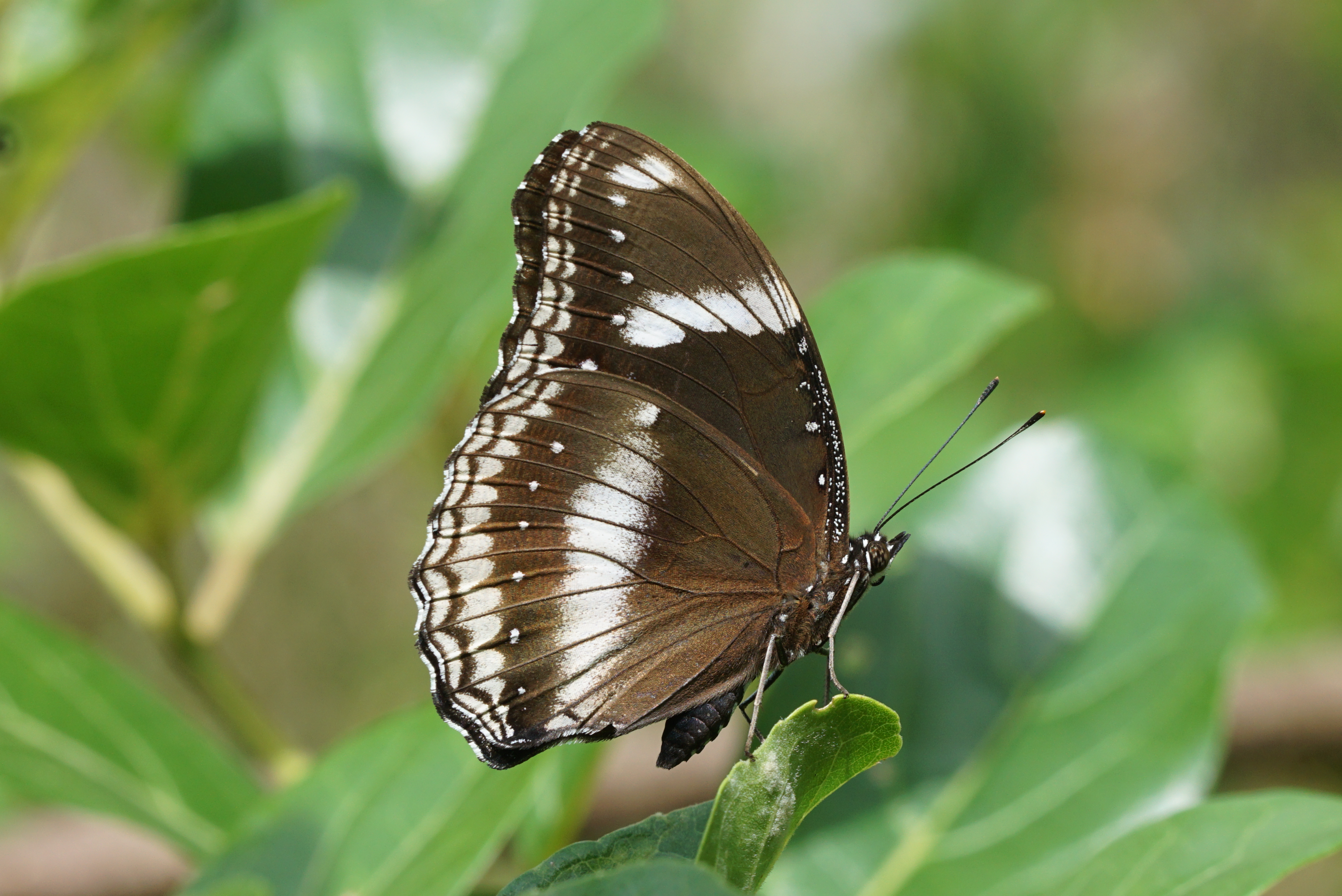
Ventral view (male)

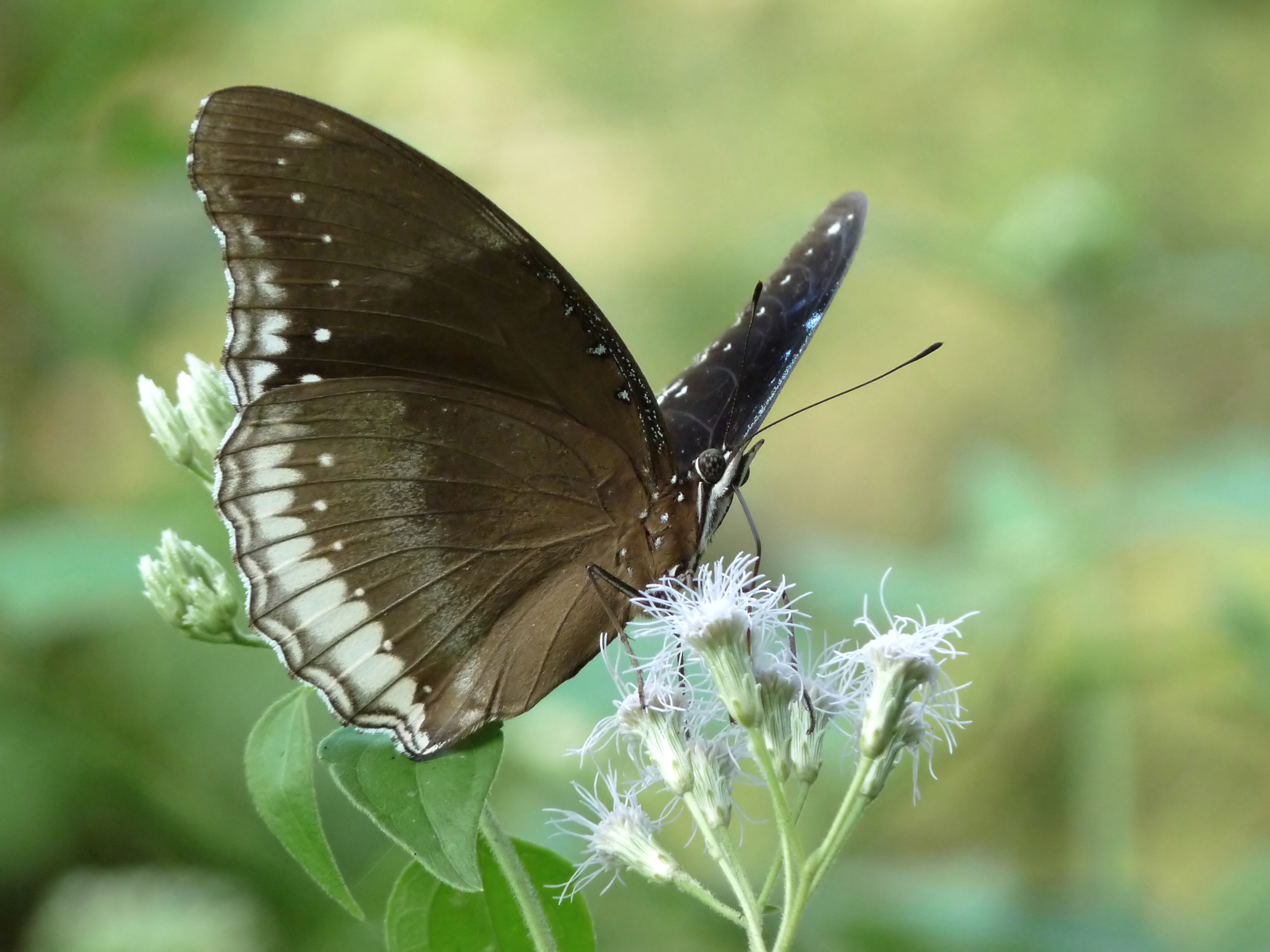
Ventral view (female)

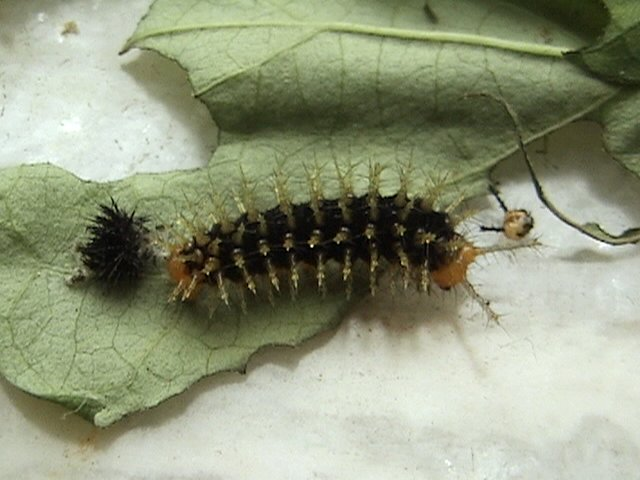
Larva

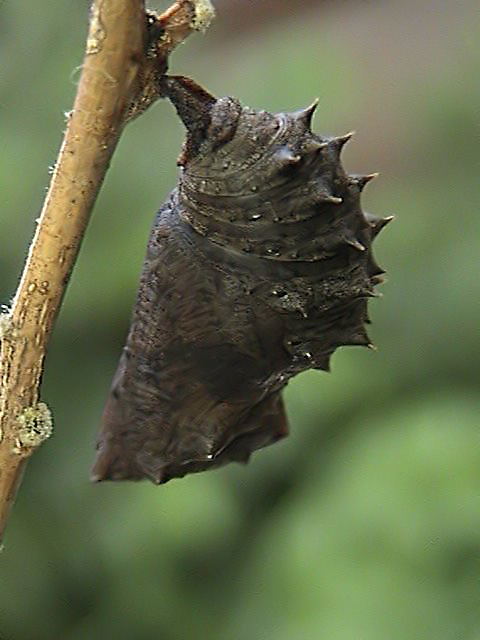
Pupa

===== Hypolimnas misippus (Danaid eggfly) =====
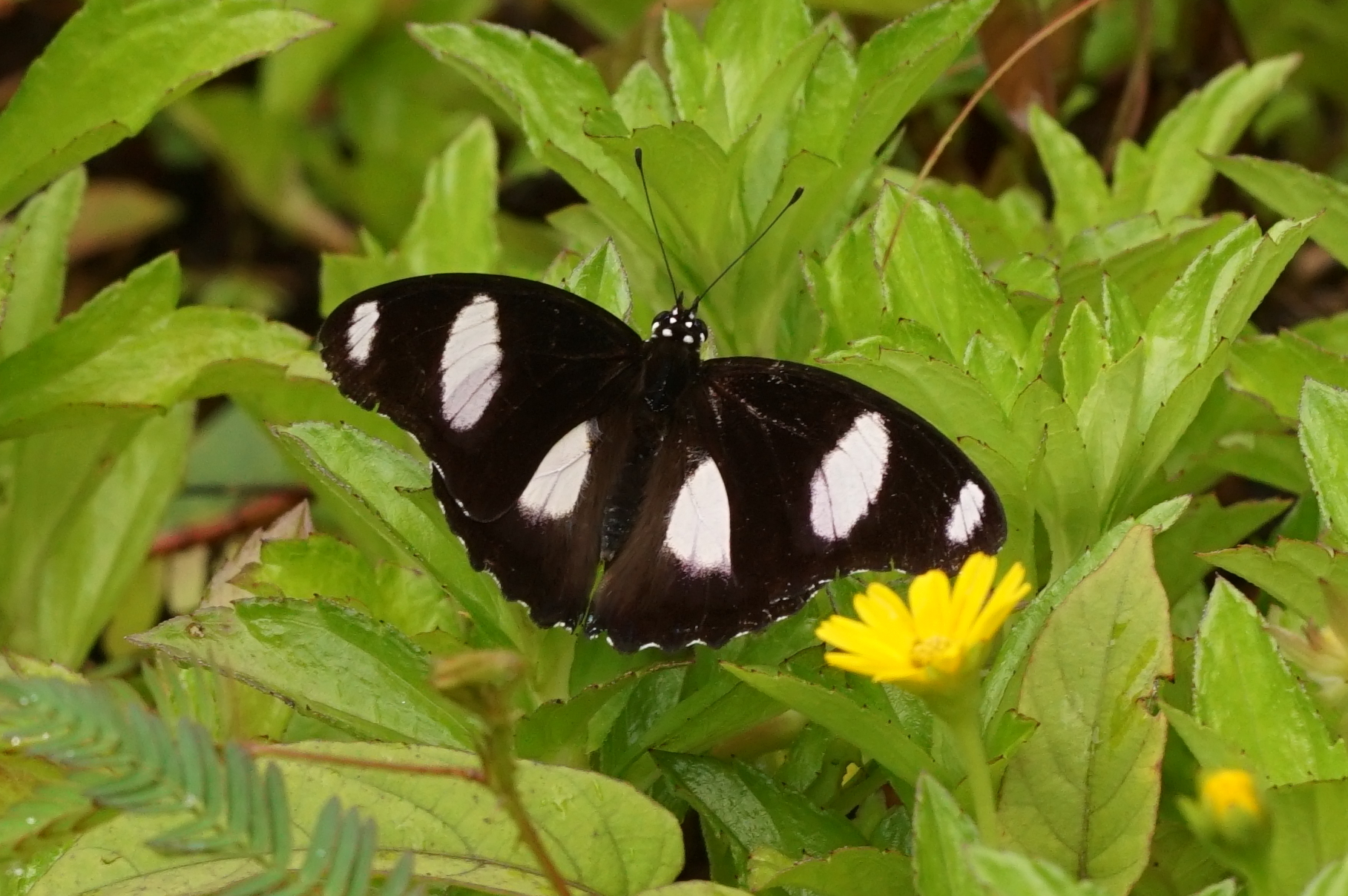
Dorsal view (male)

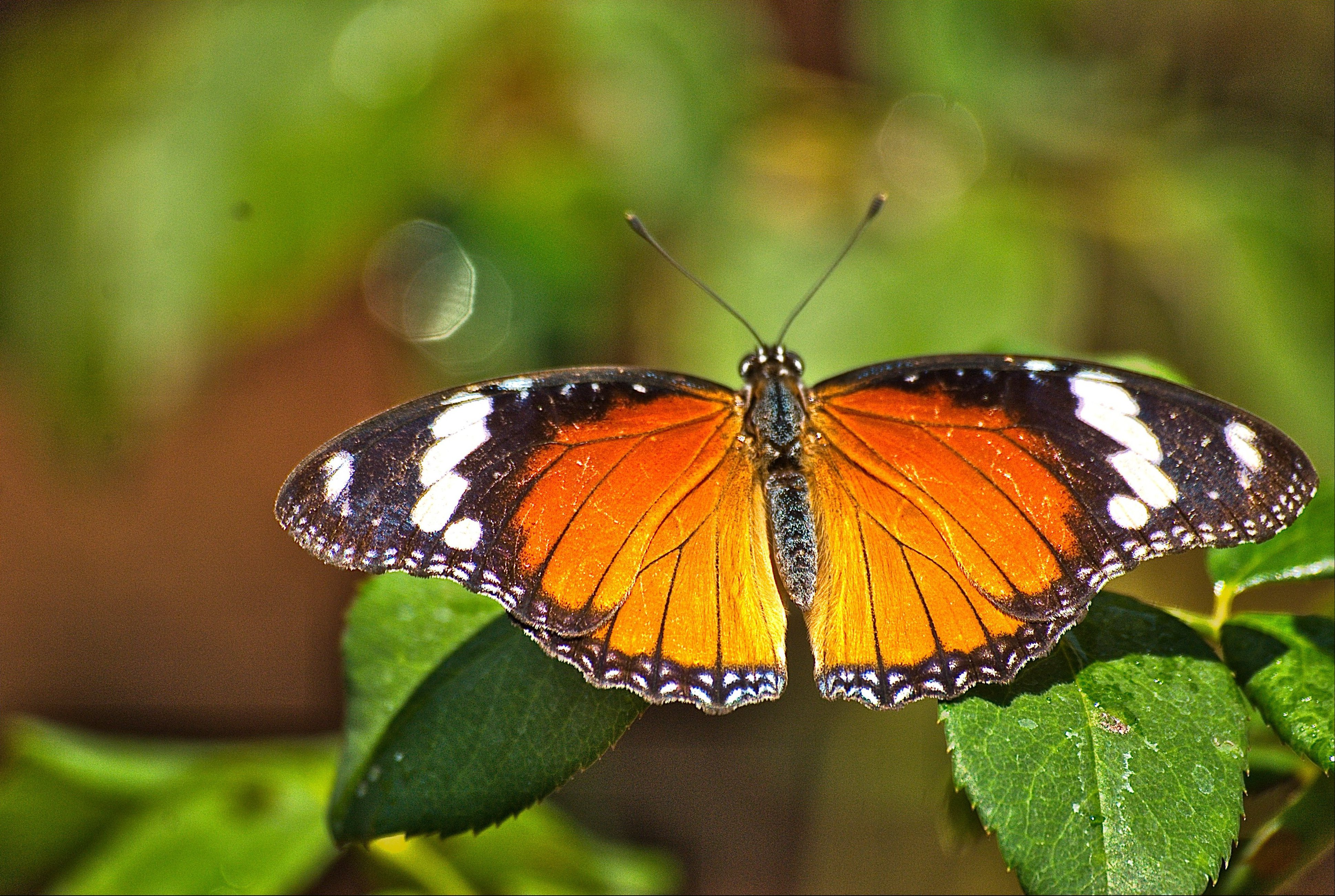
Dorsal view (female)

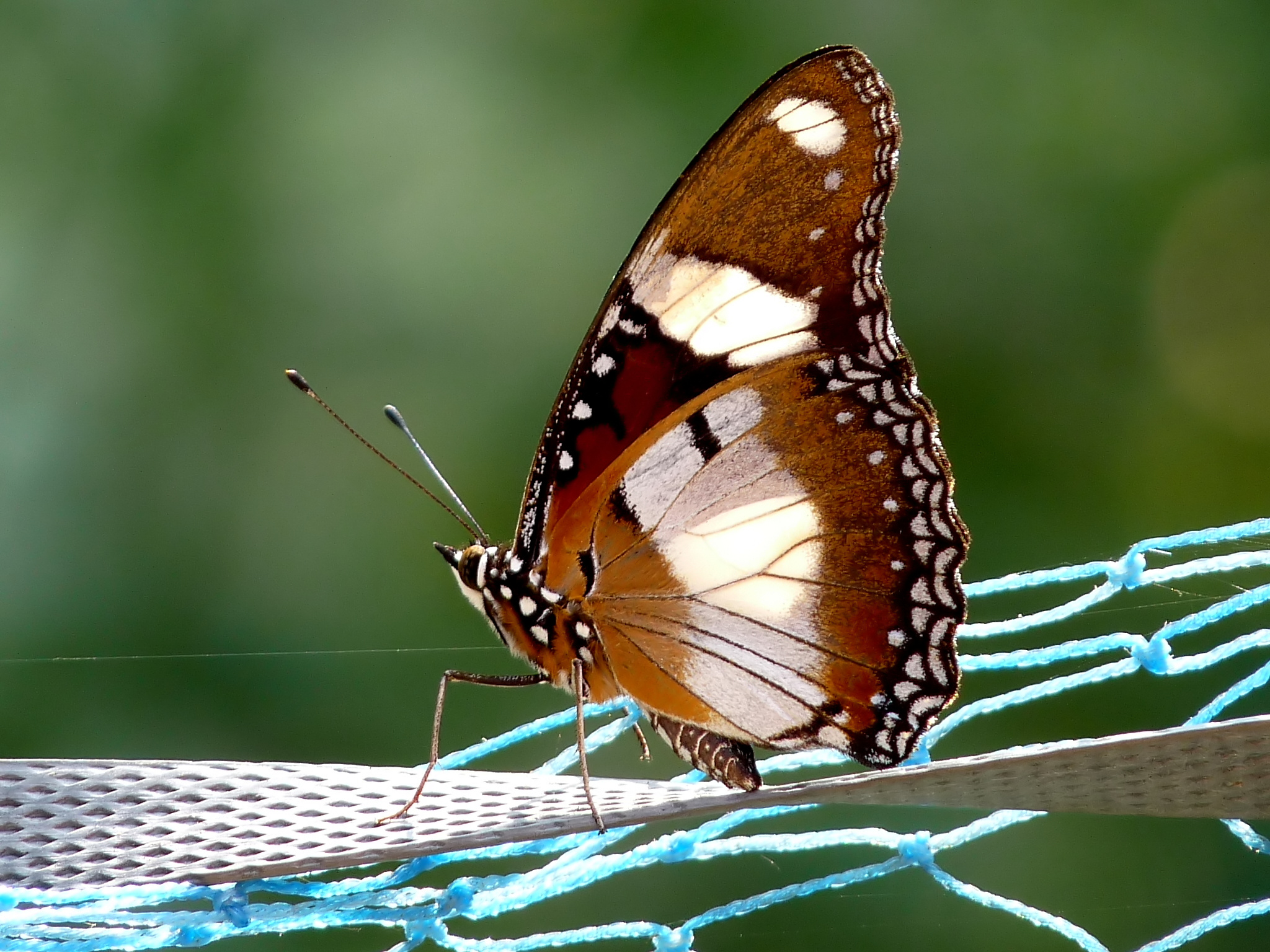
Ventral view (male)

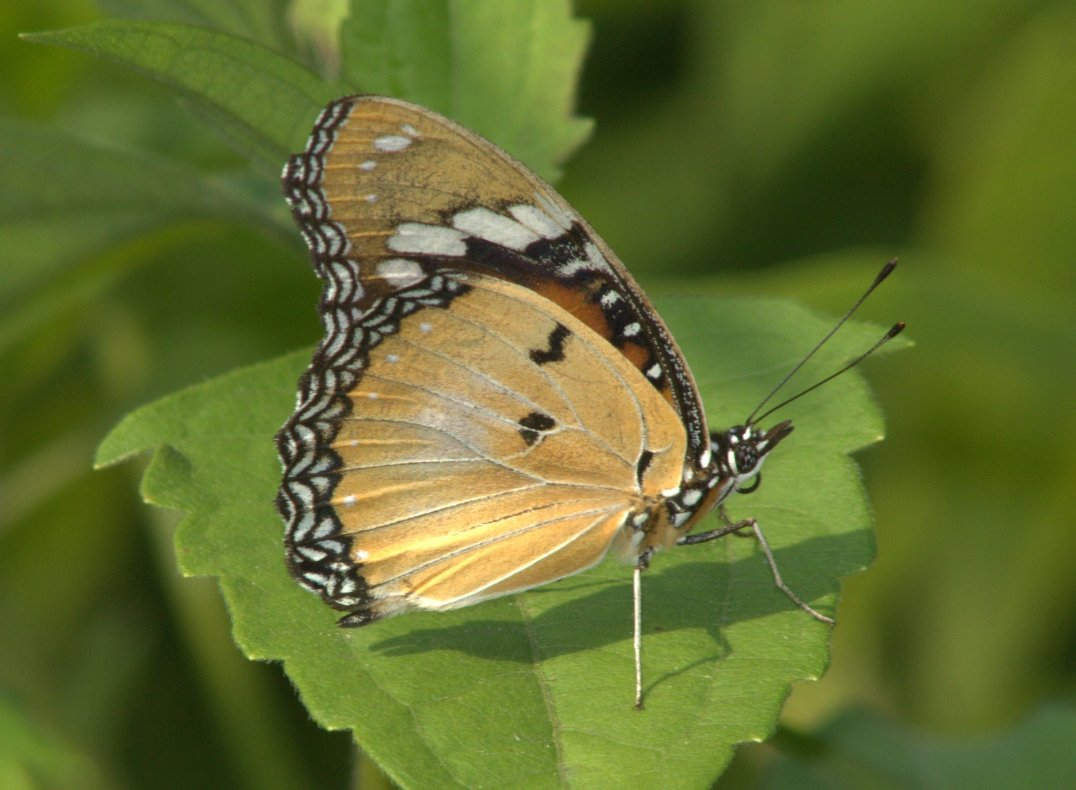
Ventral view (female)

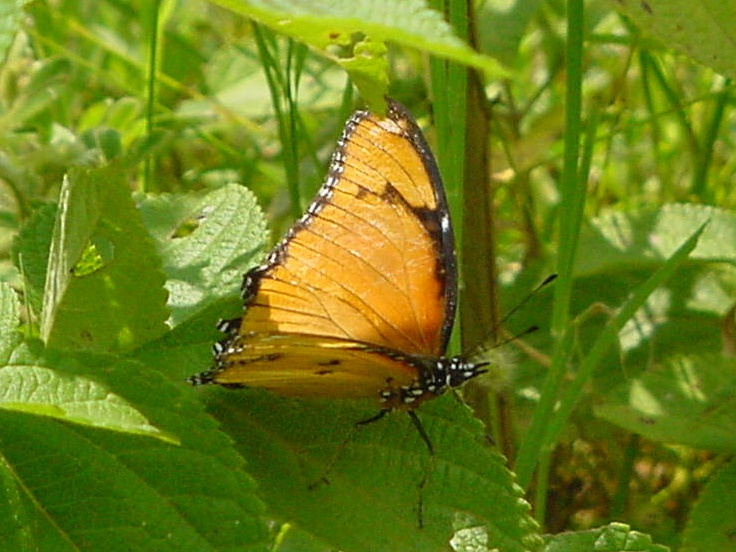
Form inaria (female)

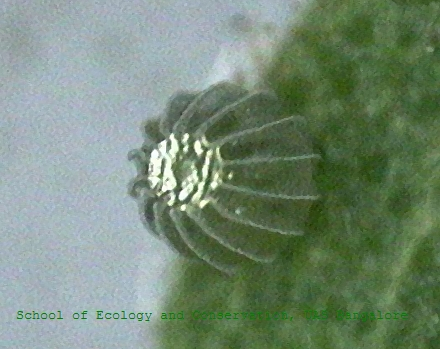
Egg

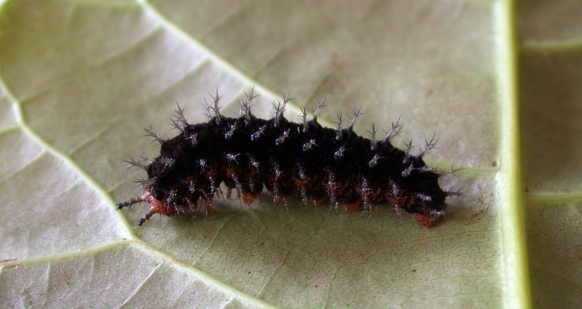
Larva

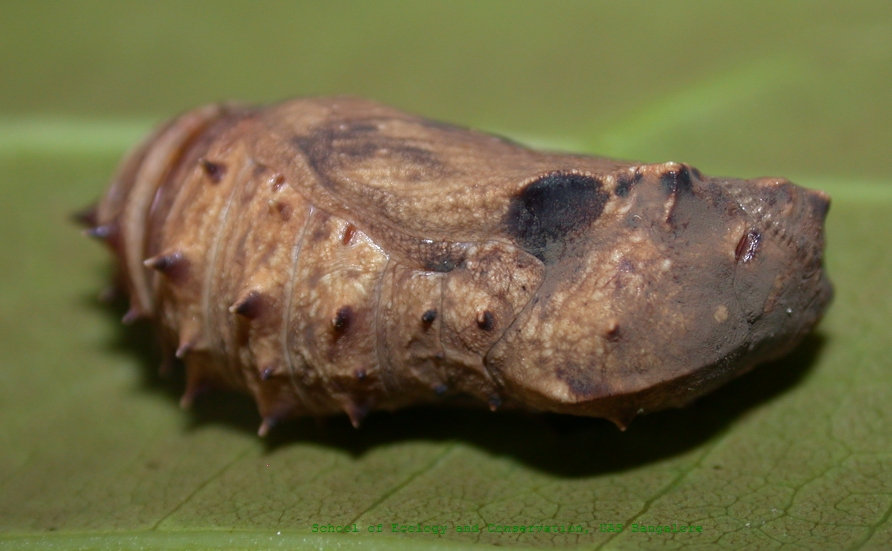
Pupa

==== Genus: Junonia (pansies) ====
===== Junonia almana (peacock pansy) =====
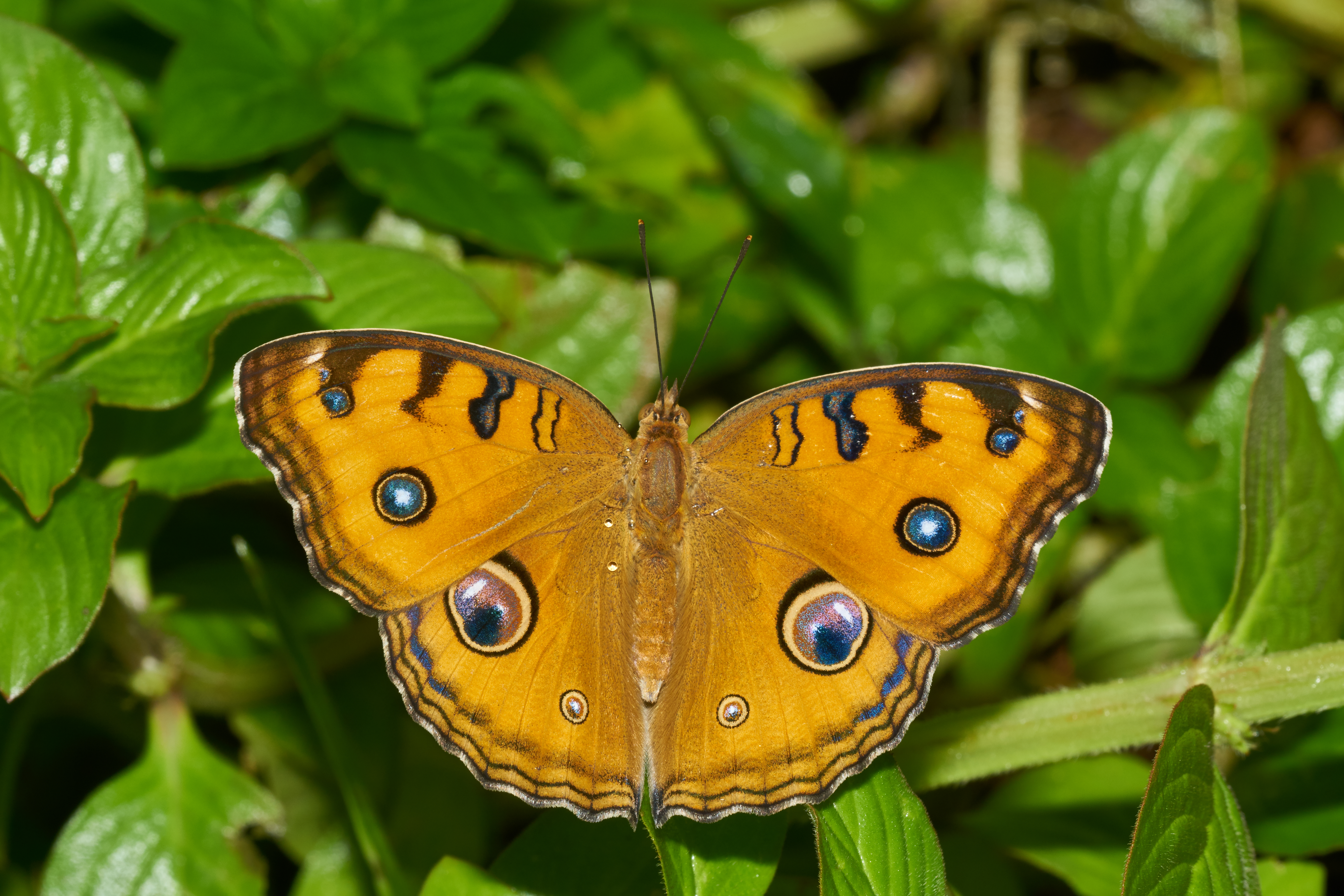
Dorsal view

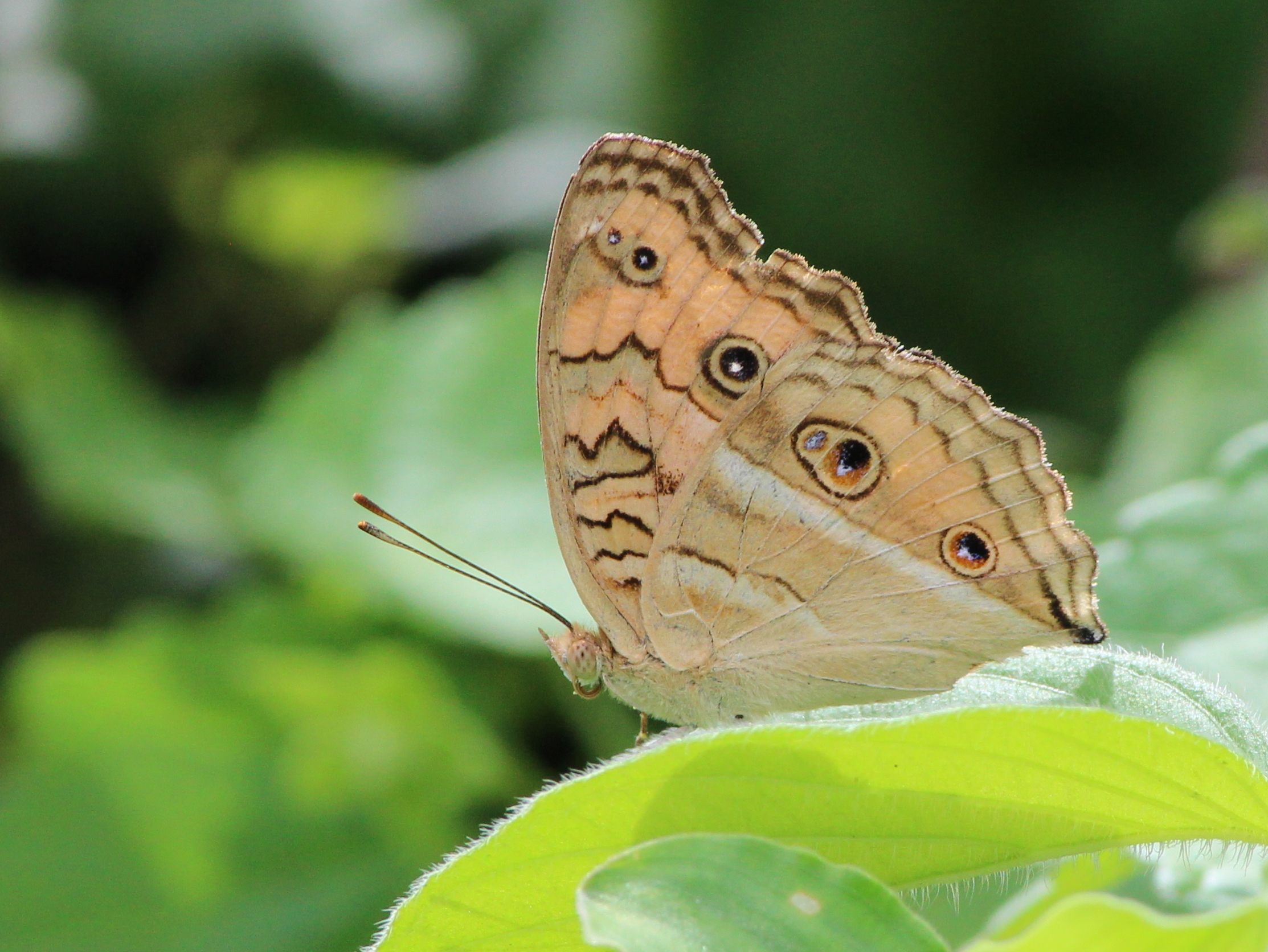
Ventral view (wet-season form)

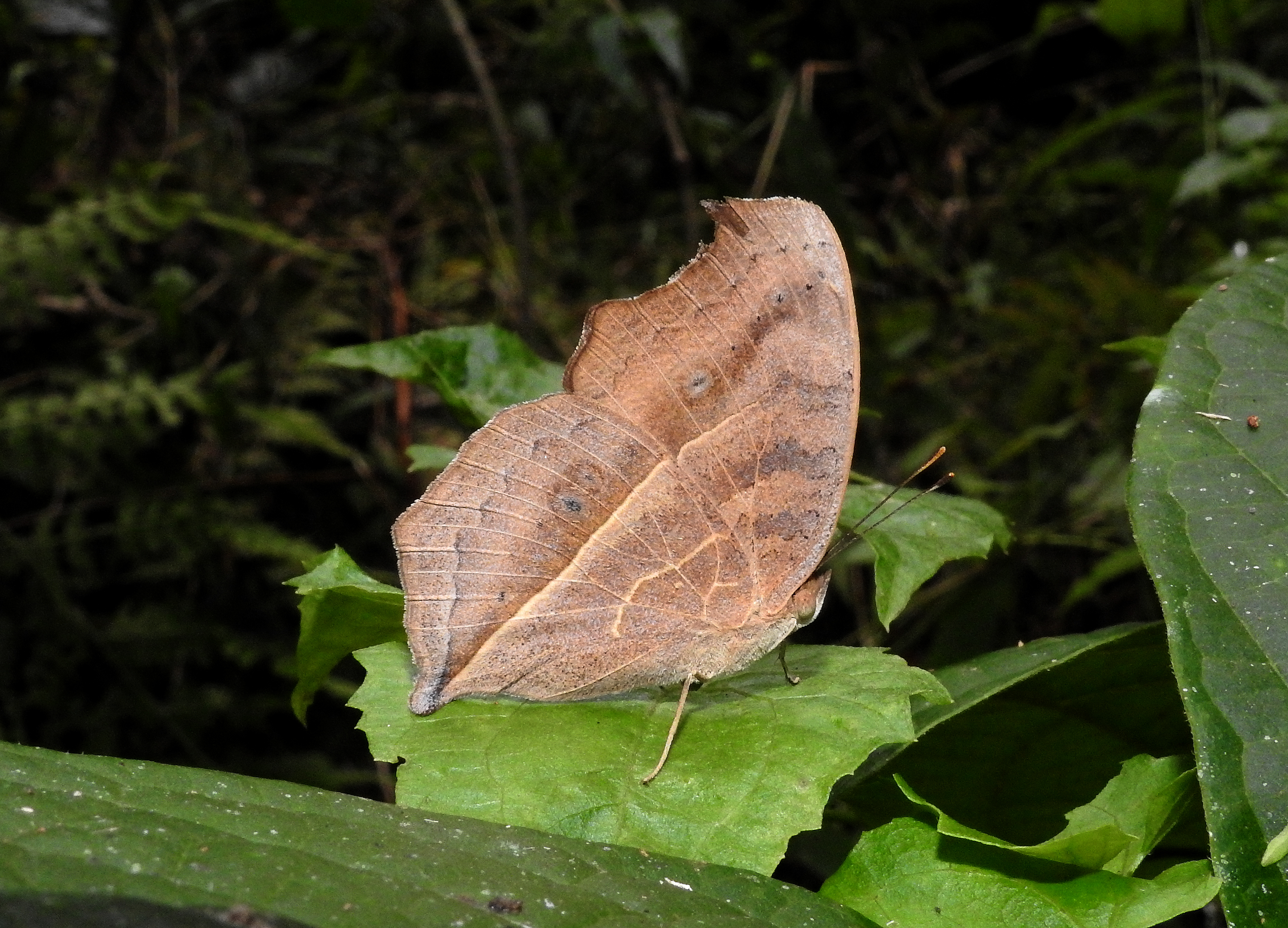
Ventral view (dry-season form)

===== Junonia atlites (grey pansy) =====
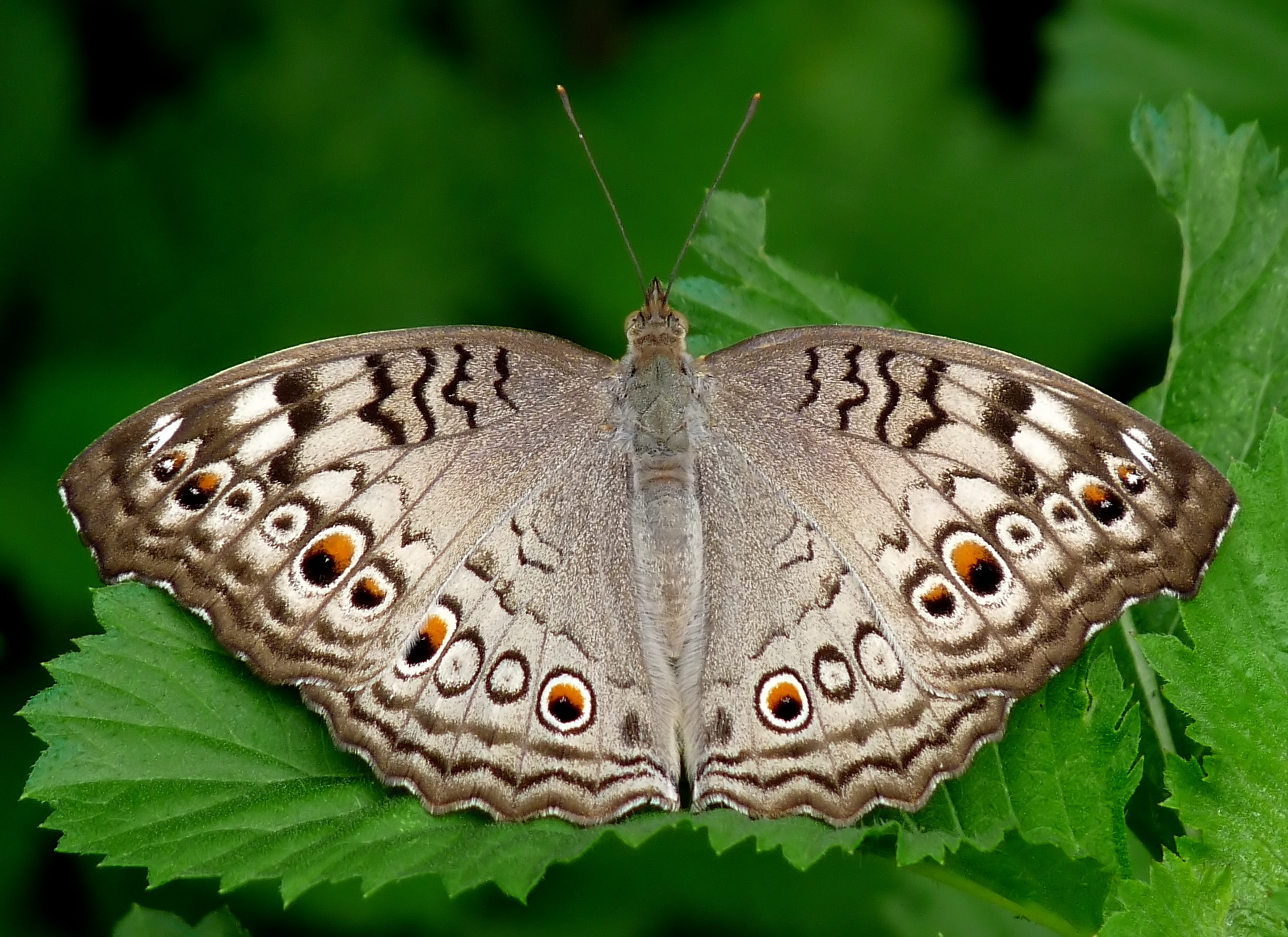
Dorsal view

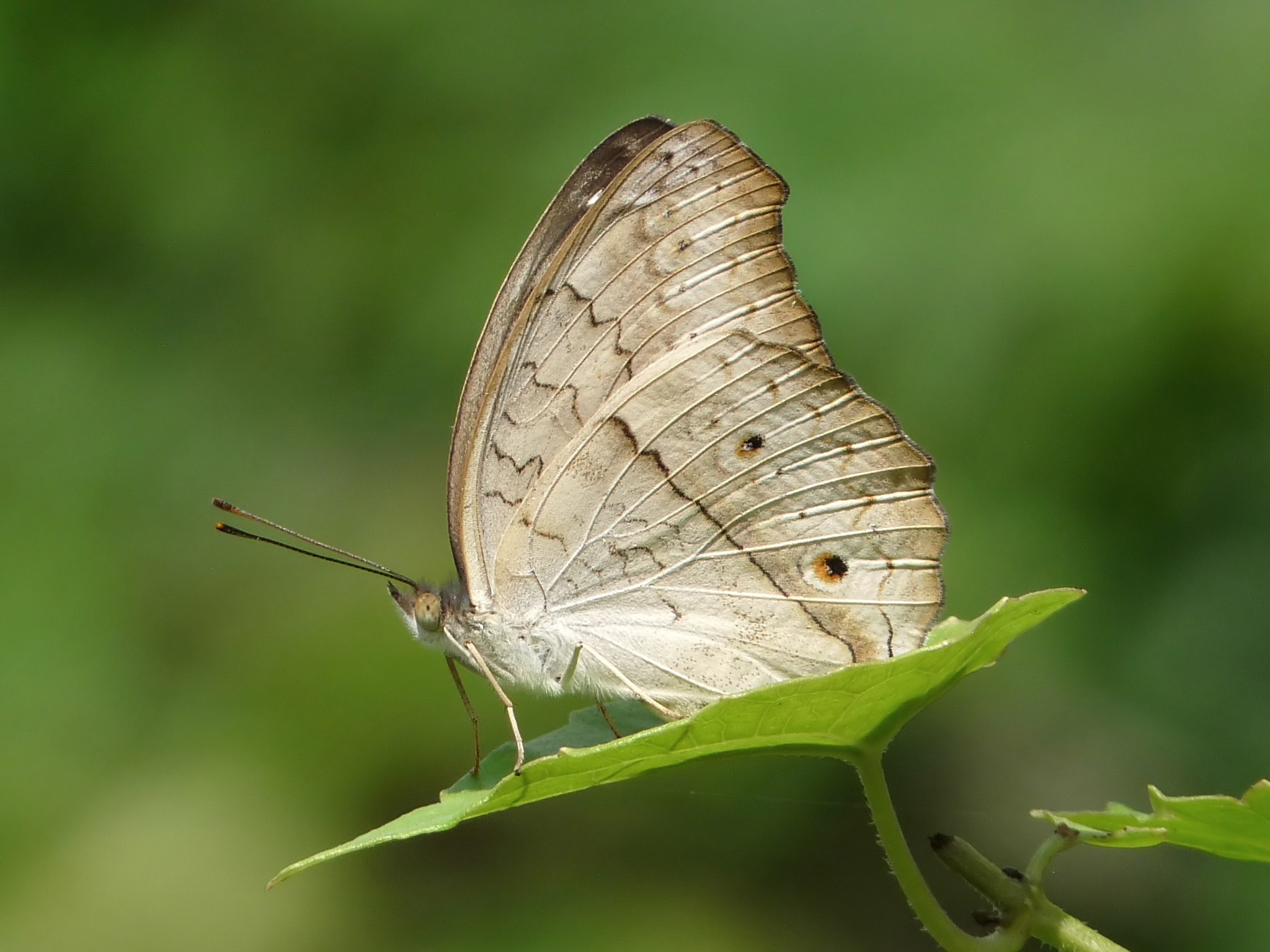
Ventral view

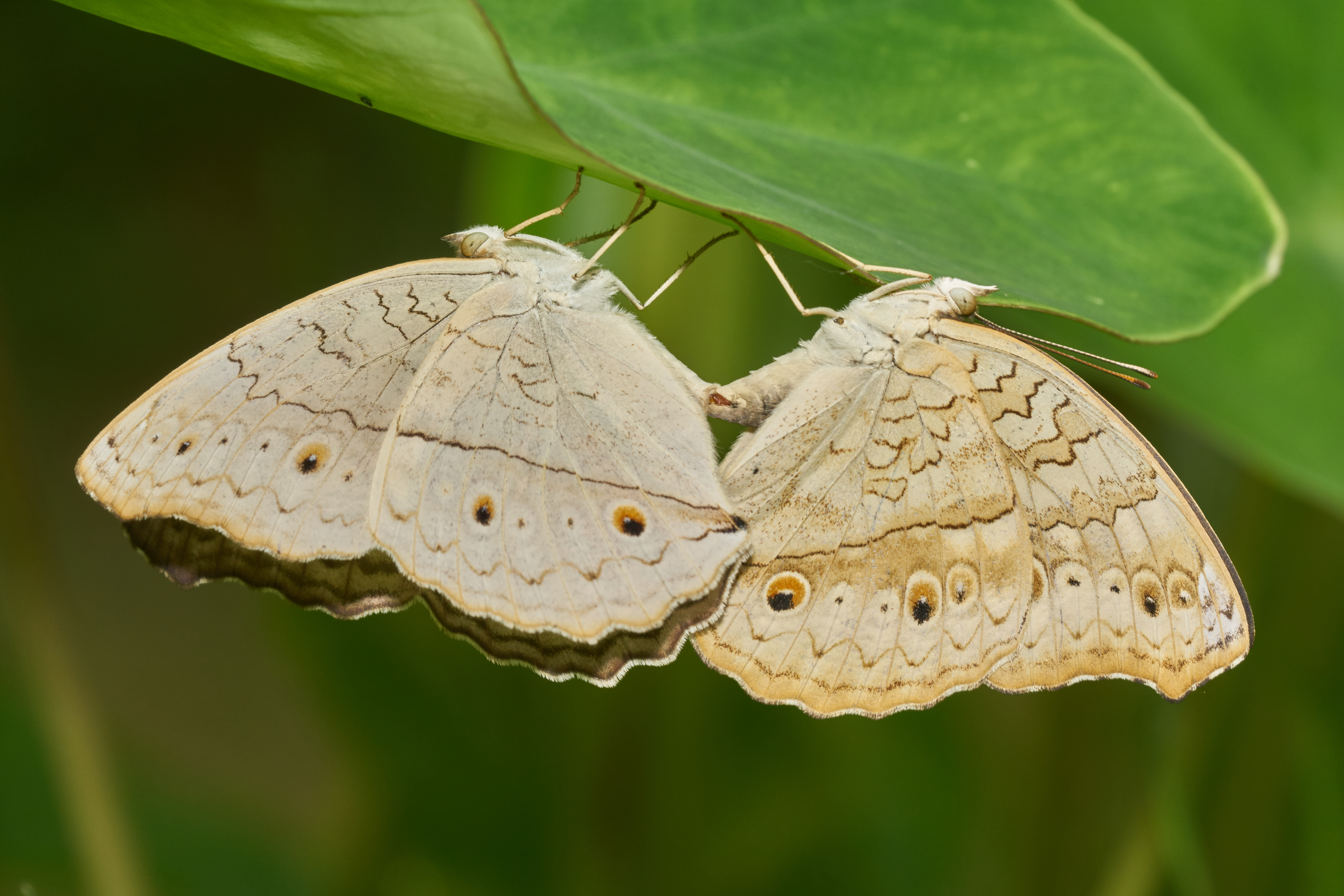
Mating pair

===== Junonia hierta (yellow pansy) =====
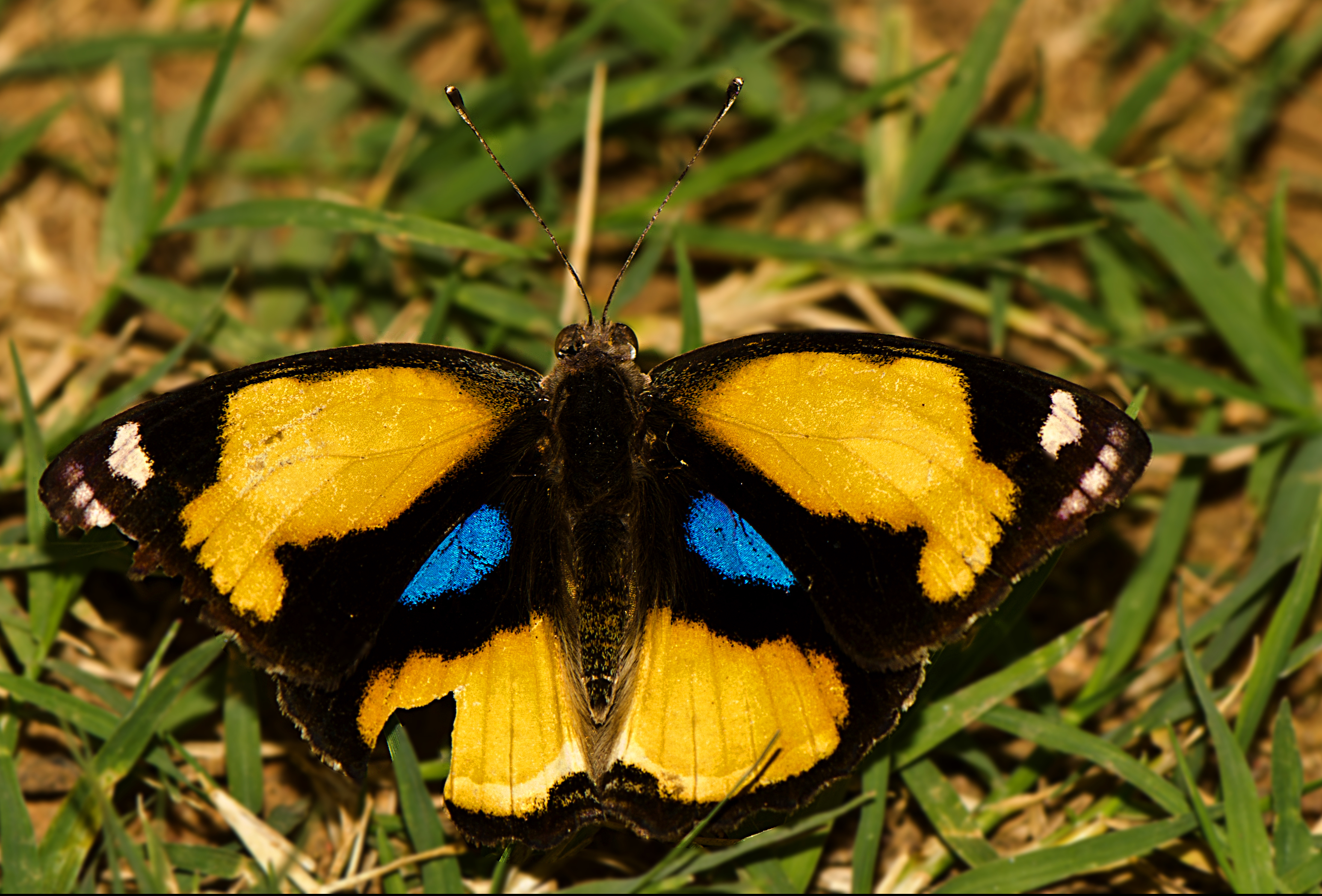
Dorsal view (male)

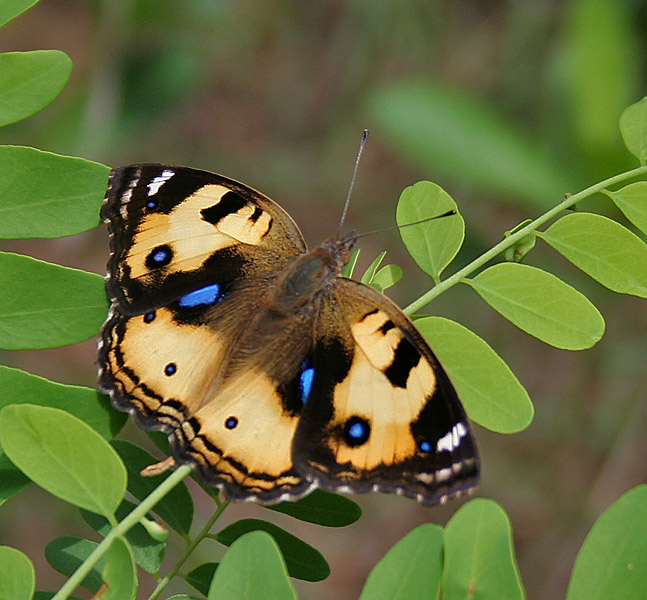
Dorsal view (female)

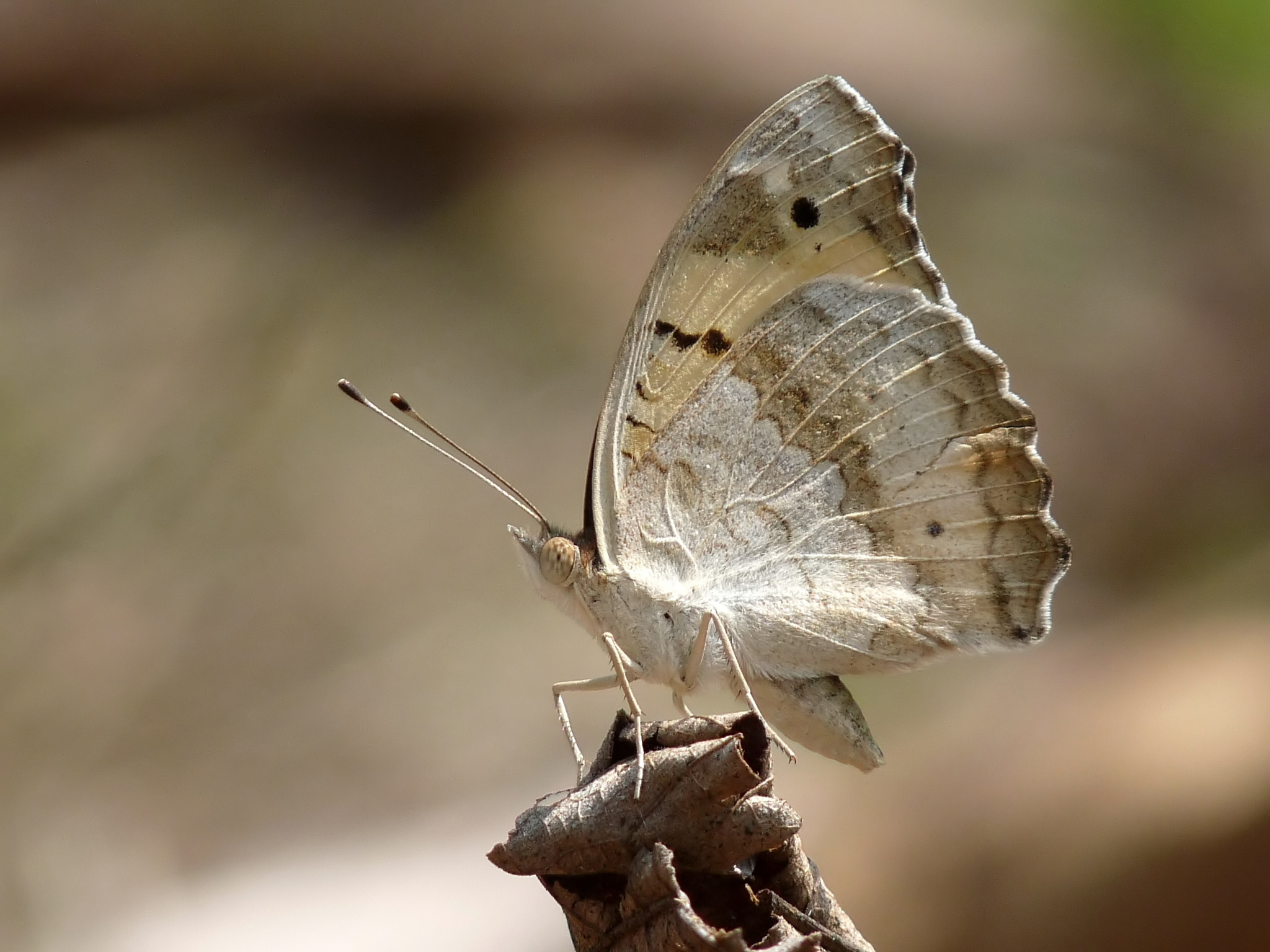
Ventral view

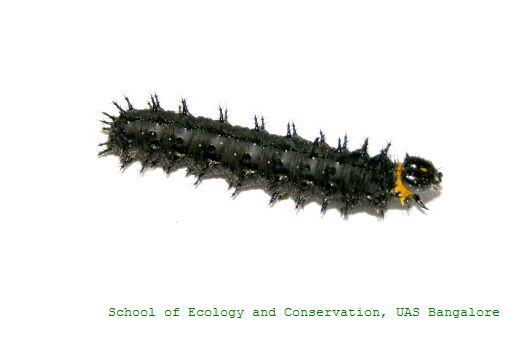
Larva

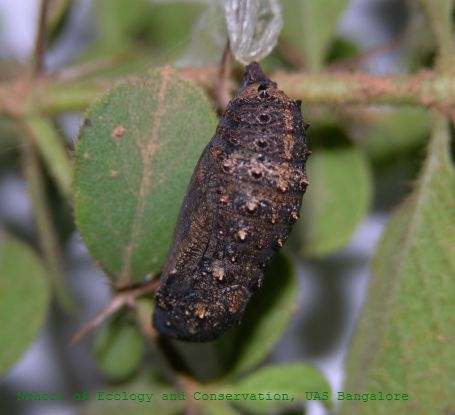
Pupa

===== Junonia iphita (chocolate pansy) =====
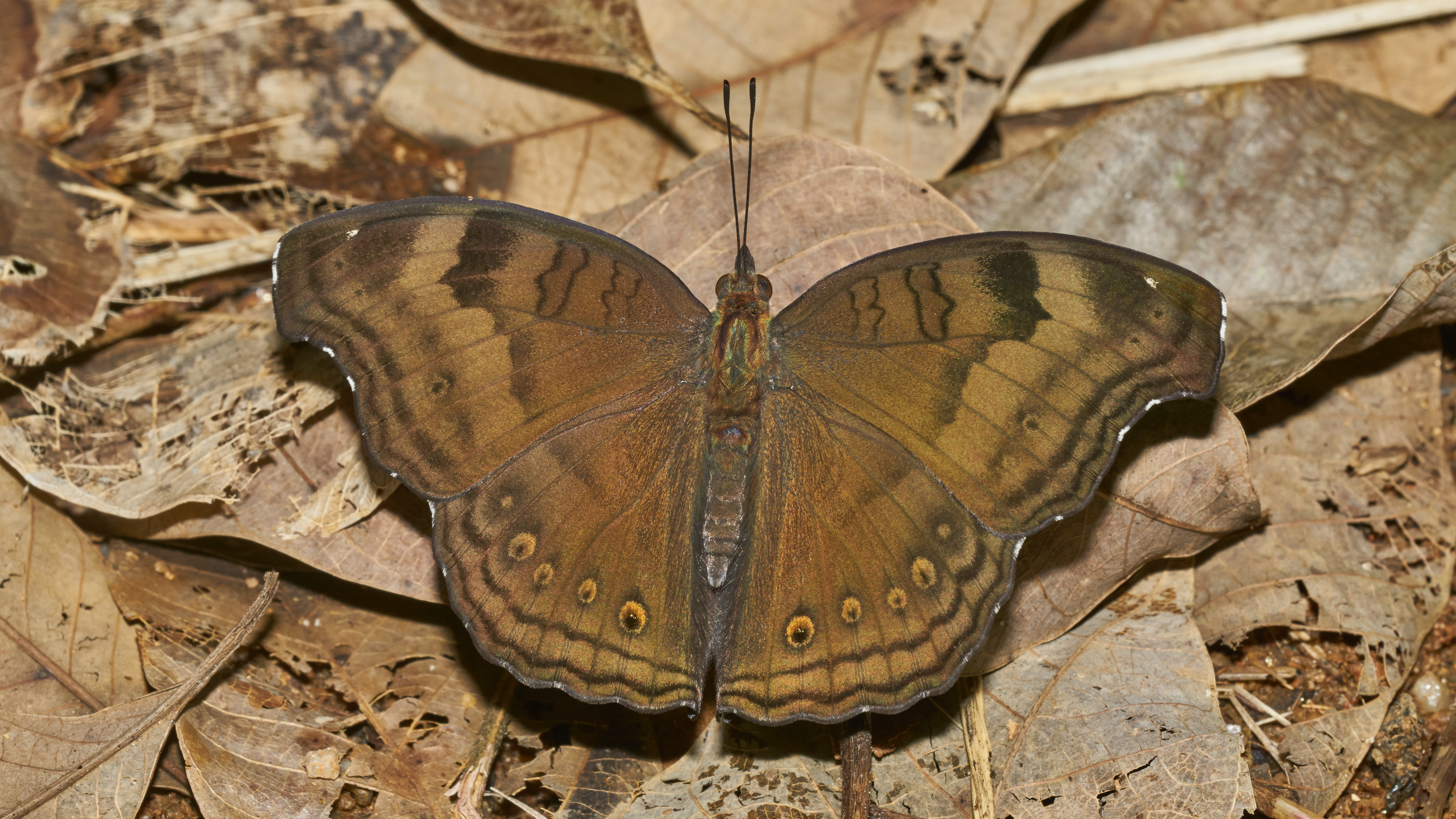
Dorsal view

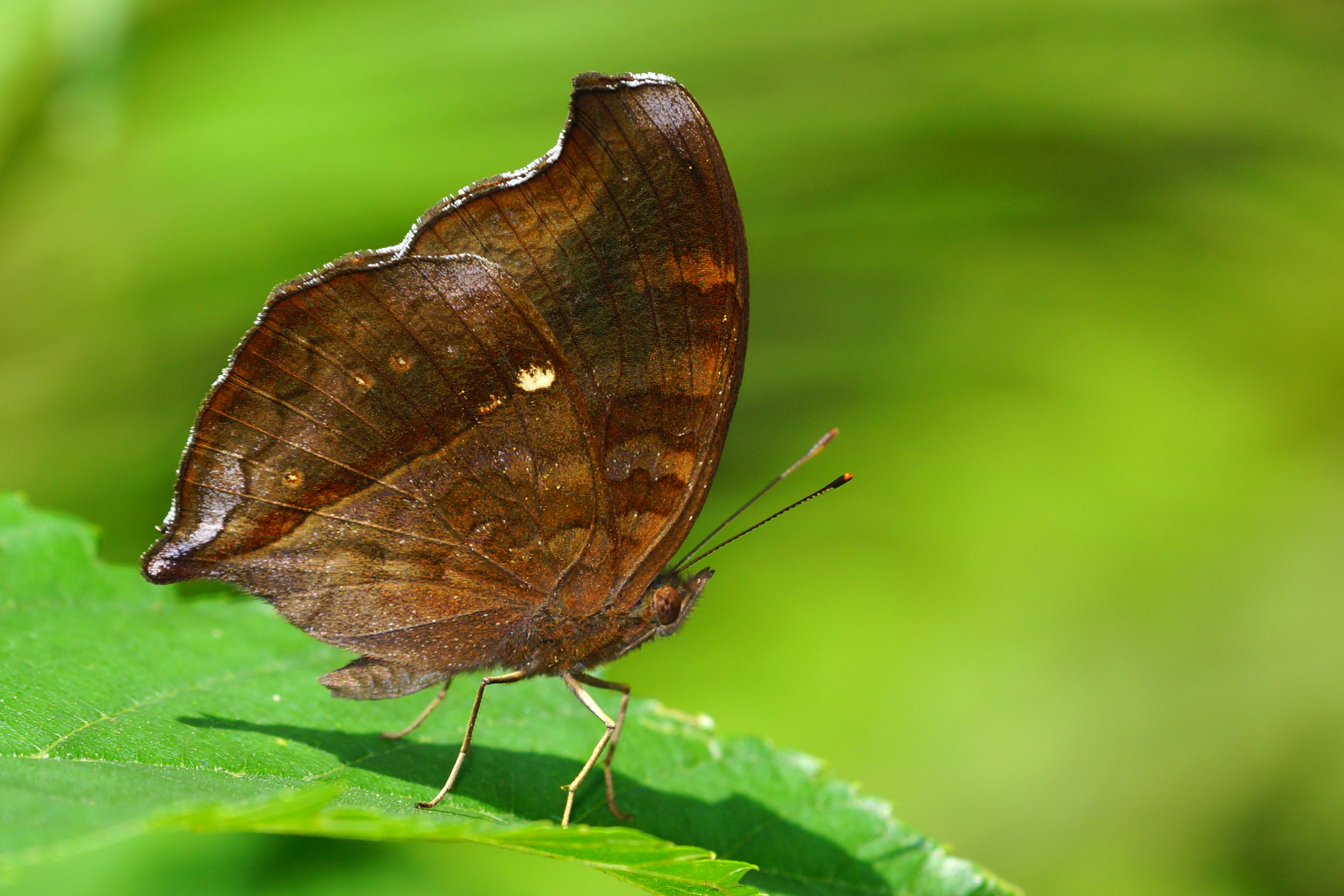
Ventral view

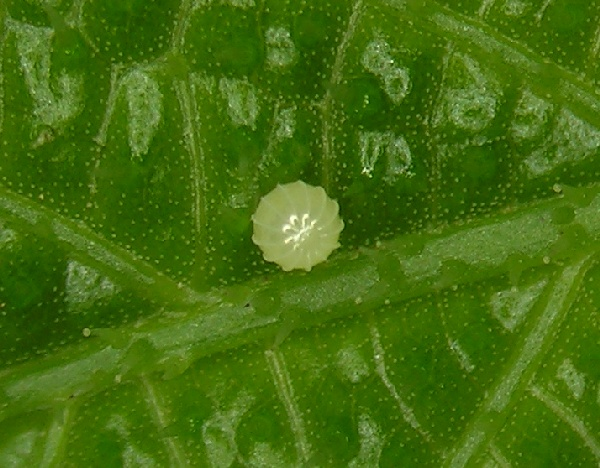
Egg

===== Junonia lemonias (lemon pansy) =====
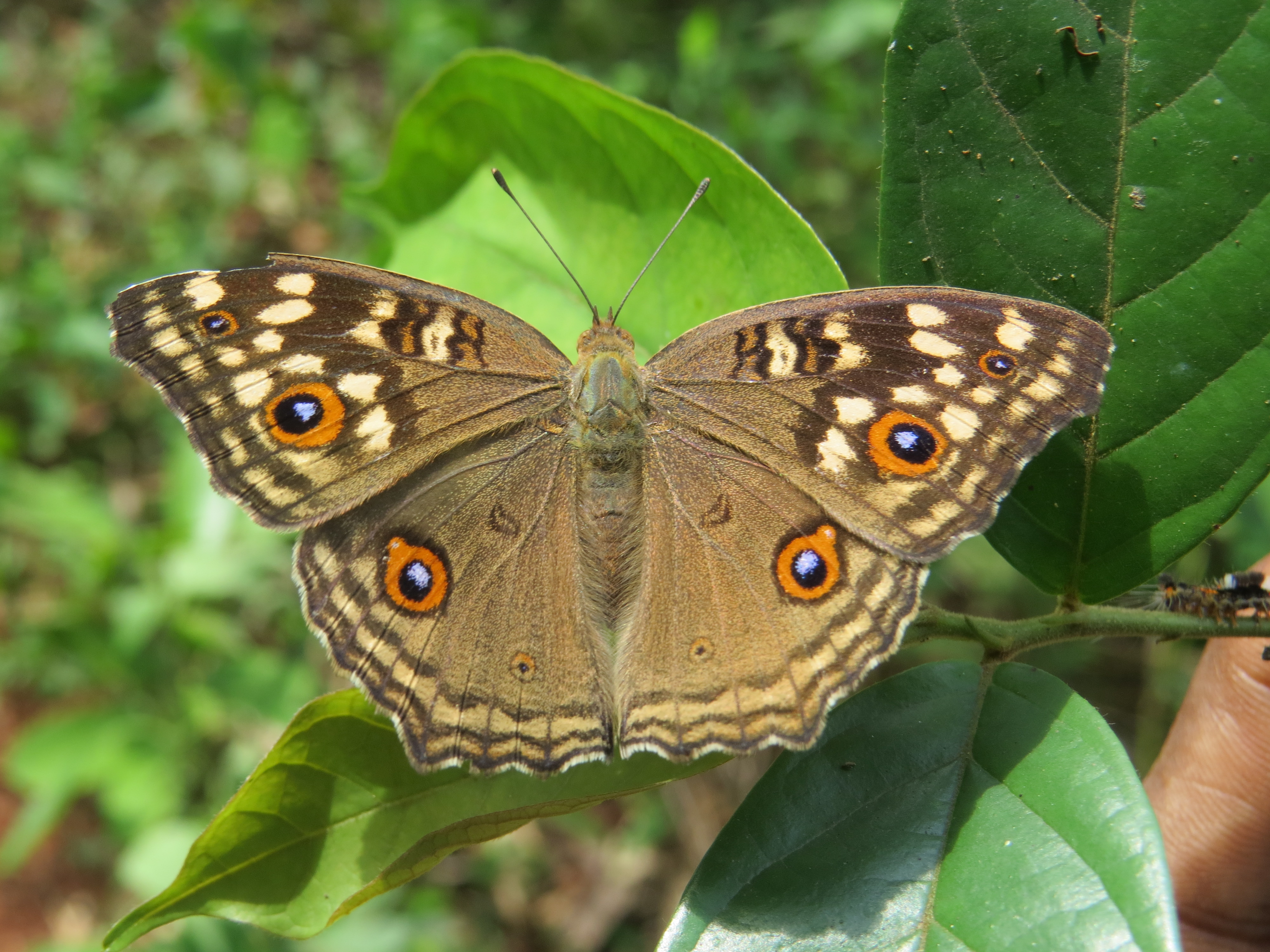
Dorsal view (wet-season form)

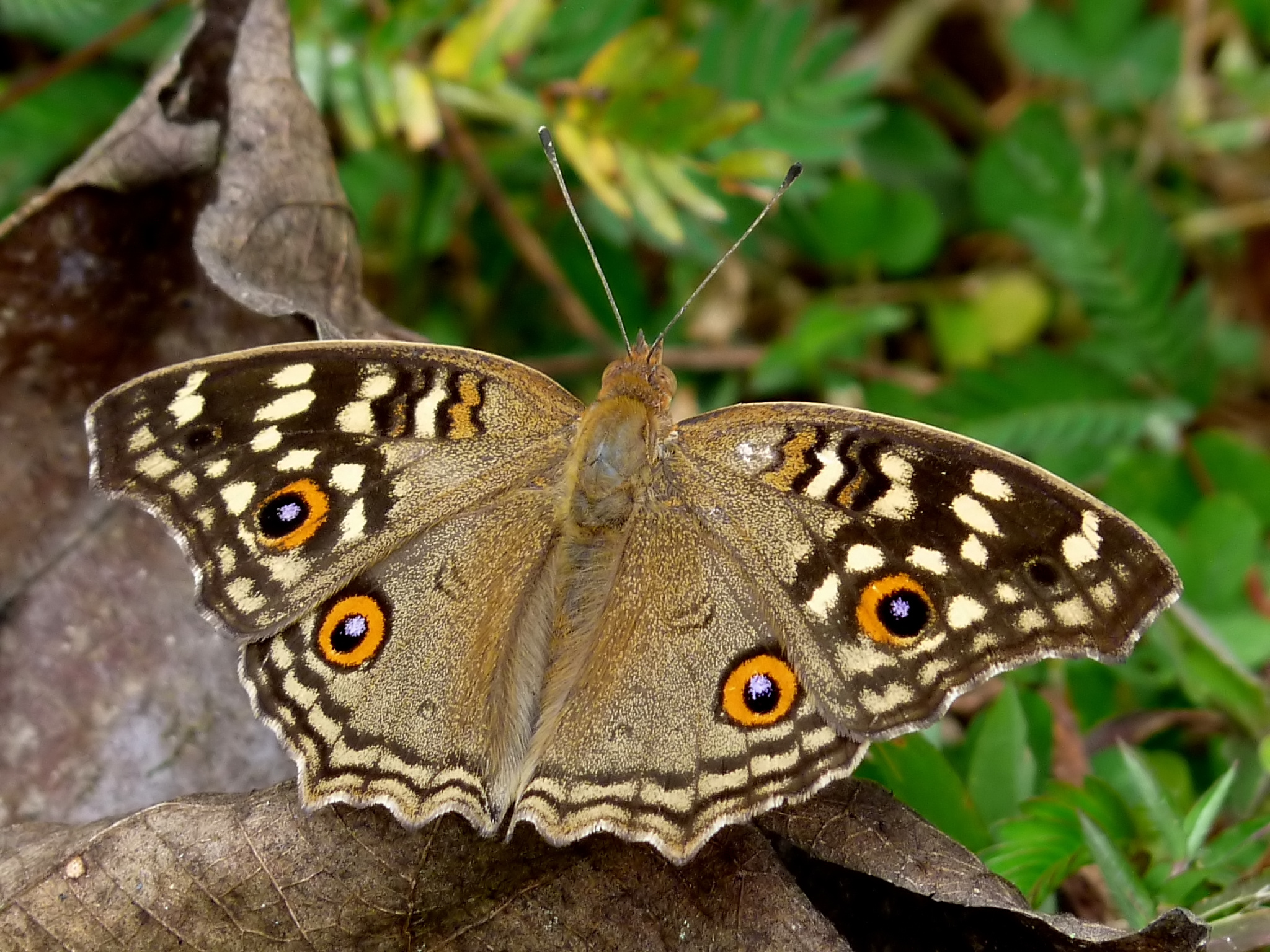
Dorsal view (dry-season form)

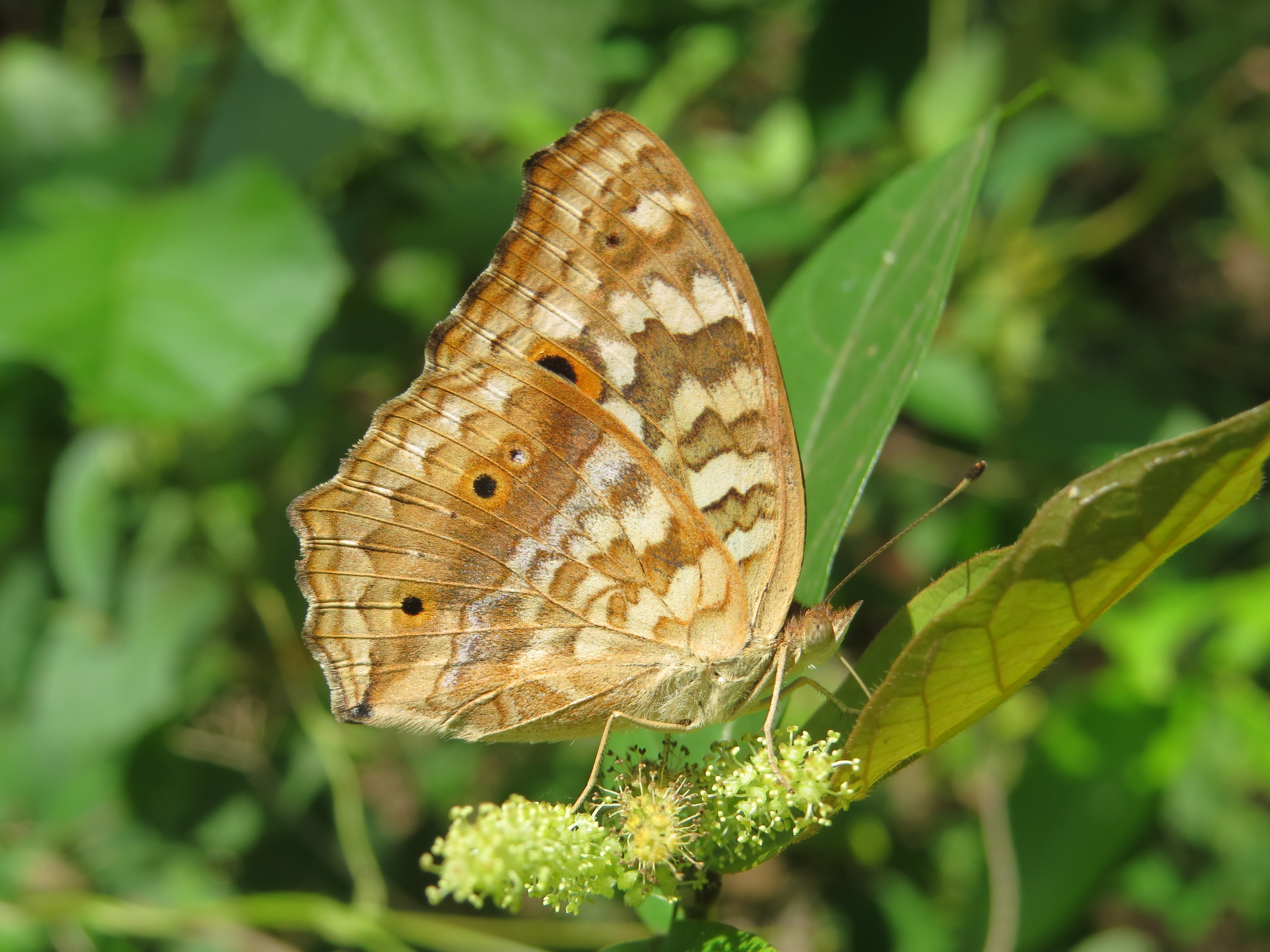
Ventral view (wet-season form)

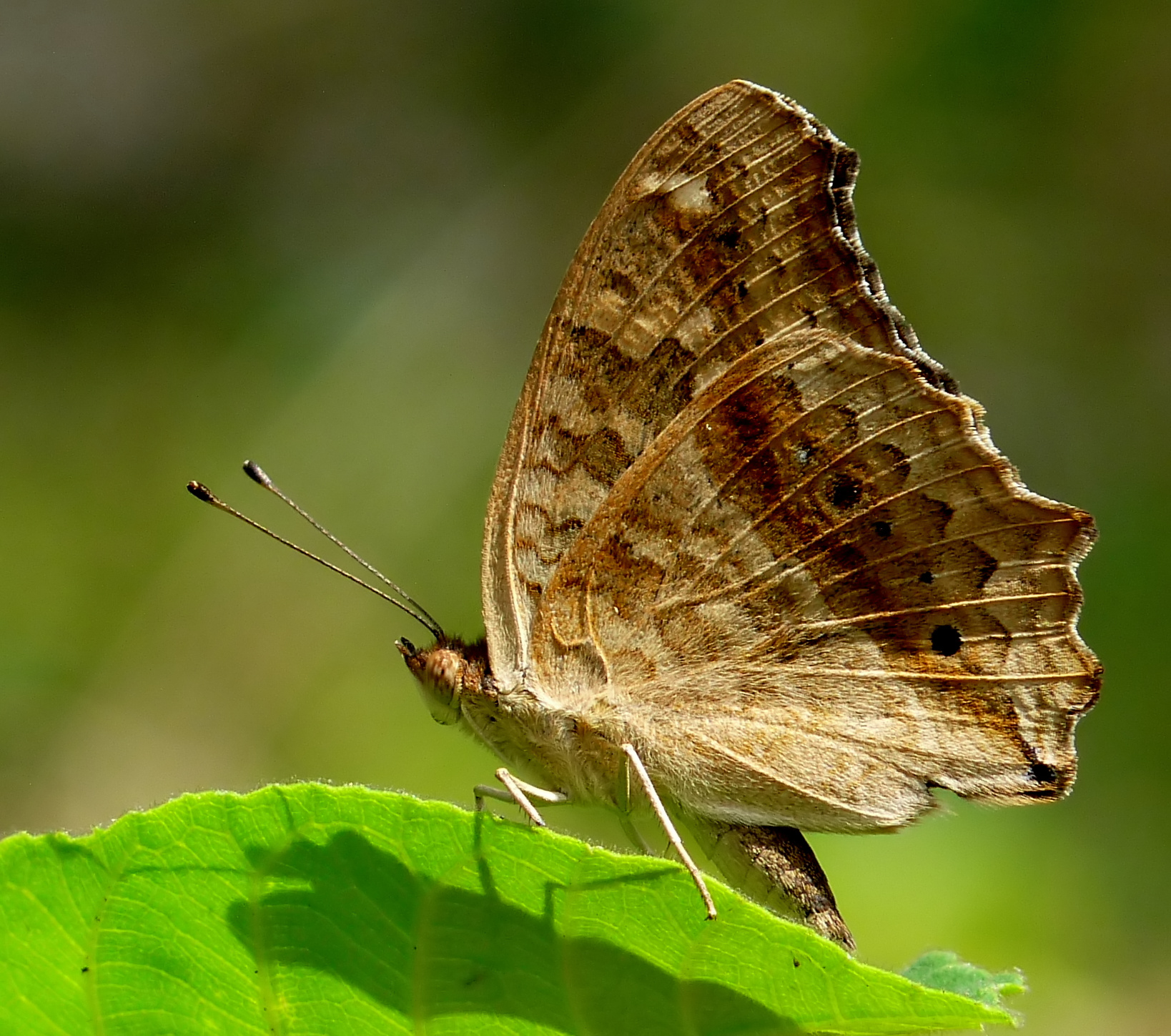
Ventral view (dry-season form)

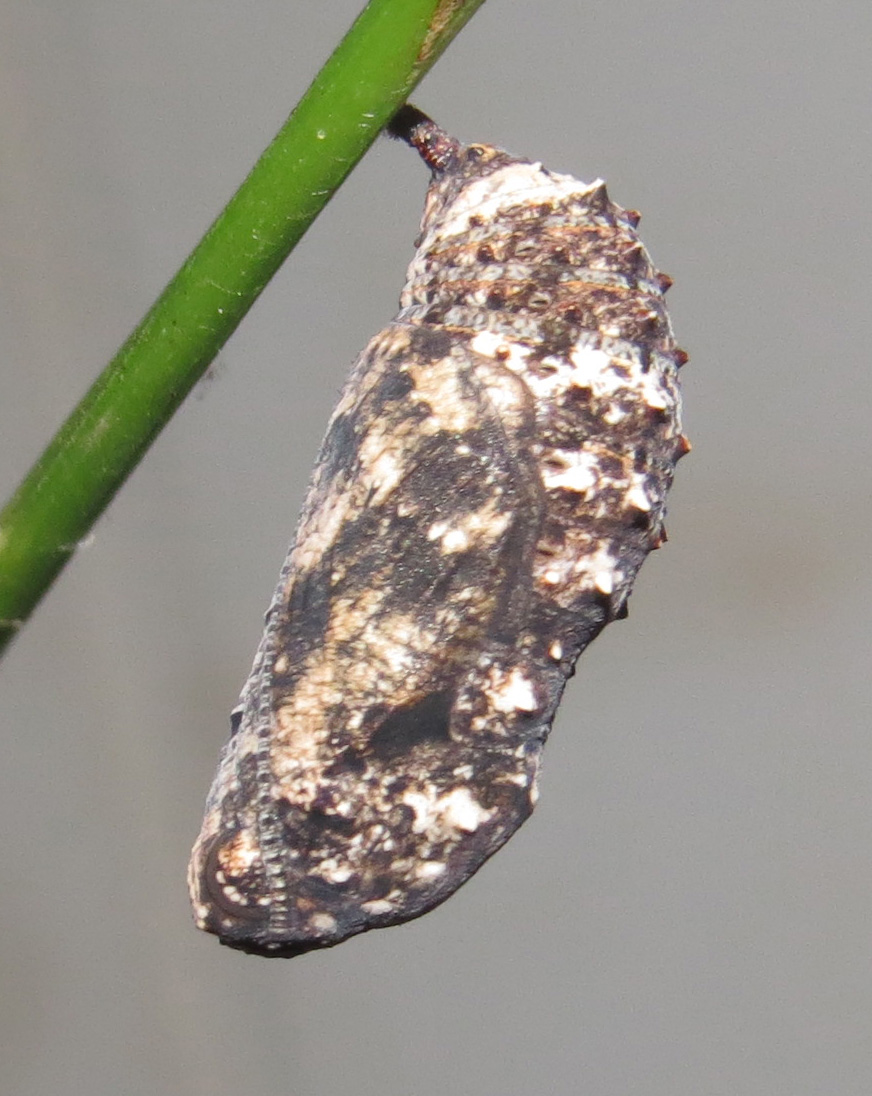
Pupa

===== Junonia orithya (blue pansy) =====
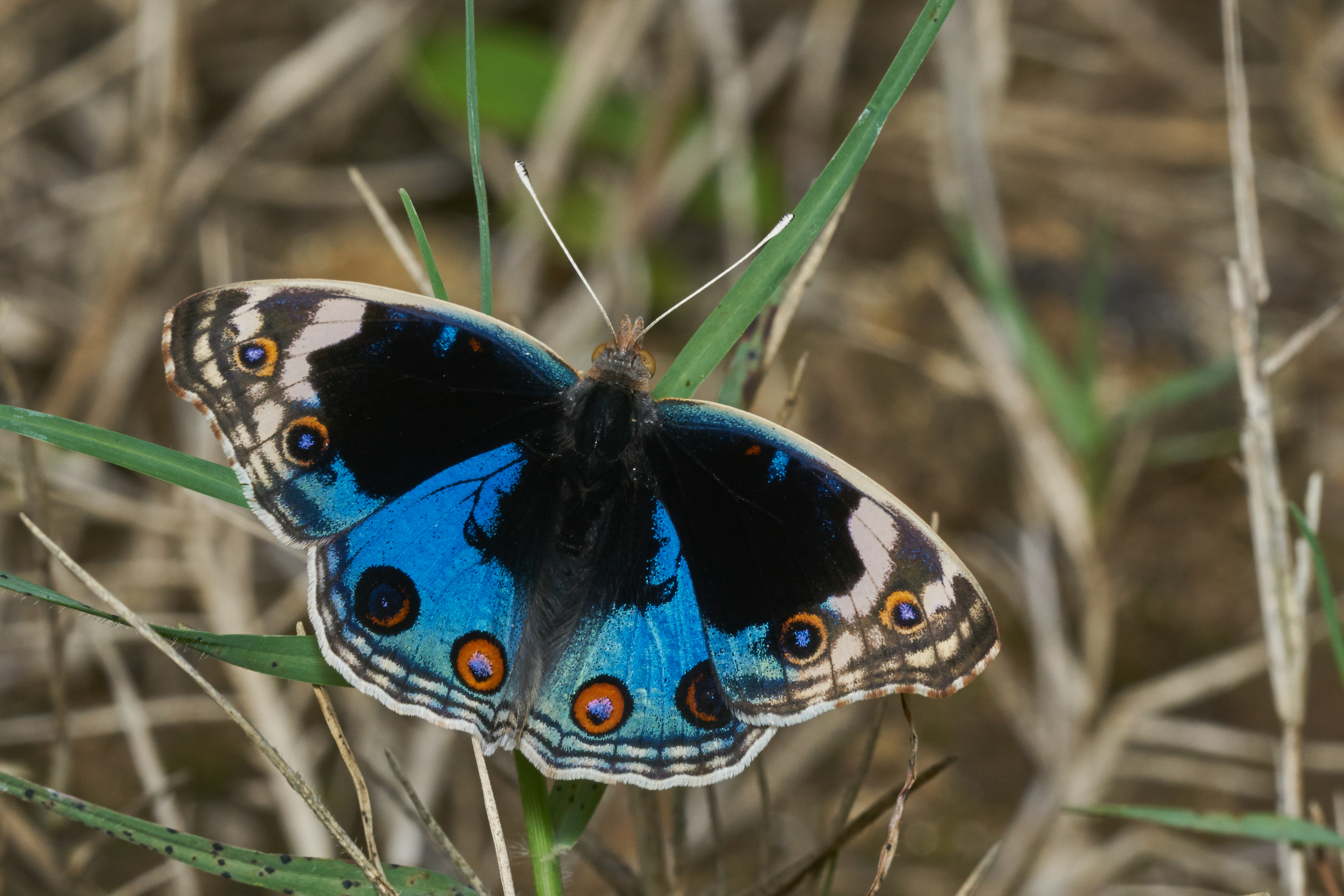
Dorsal view (male)

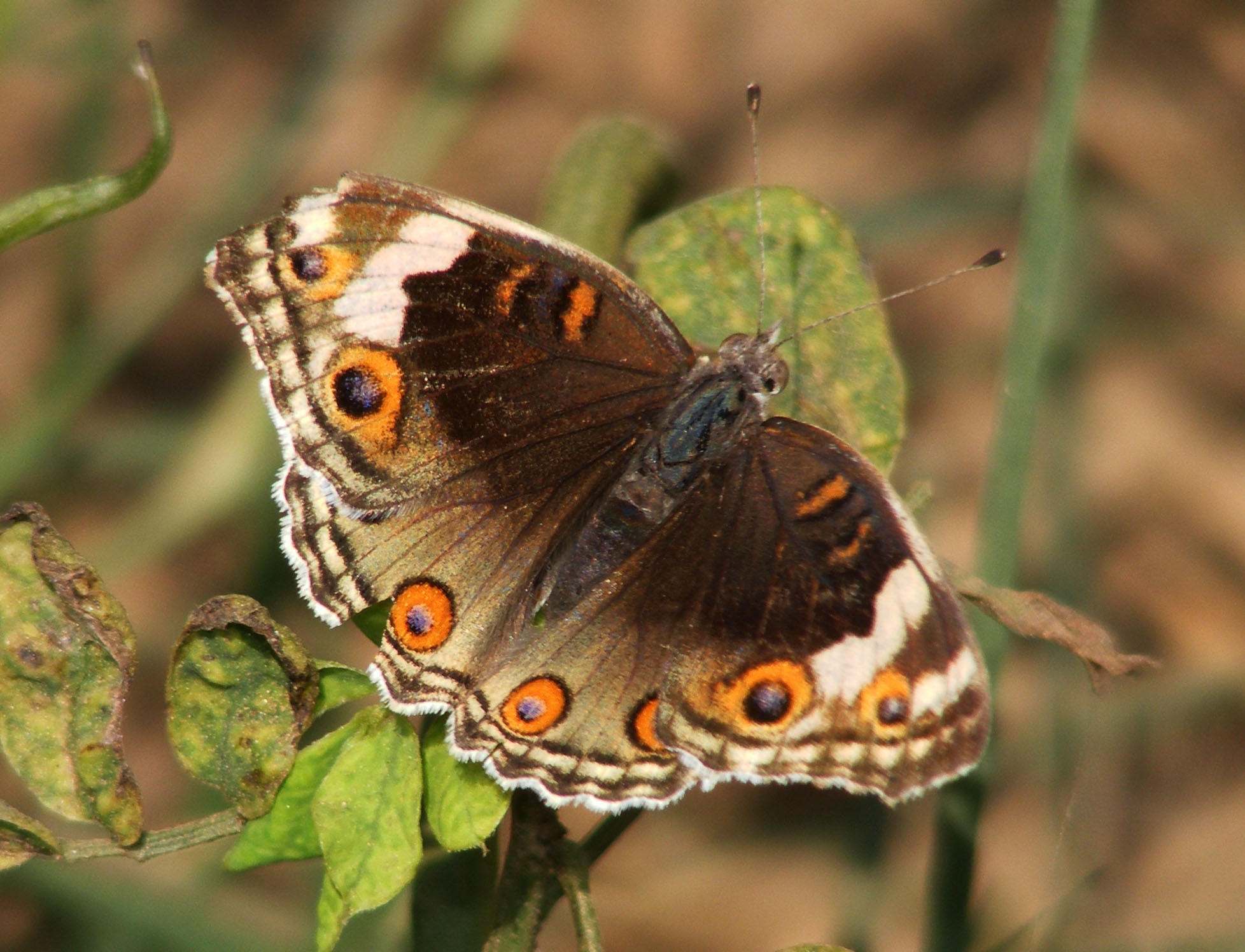
Dorsal view (female)

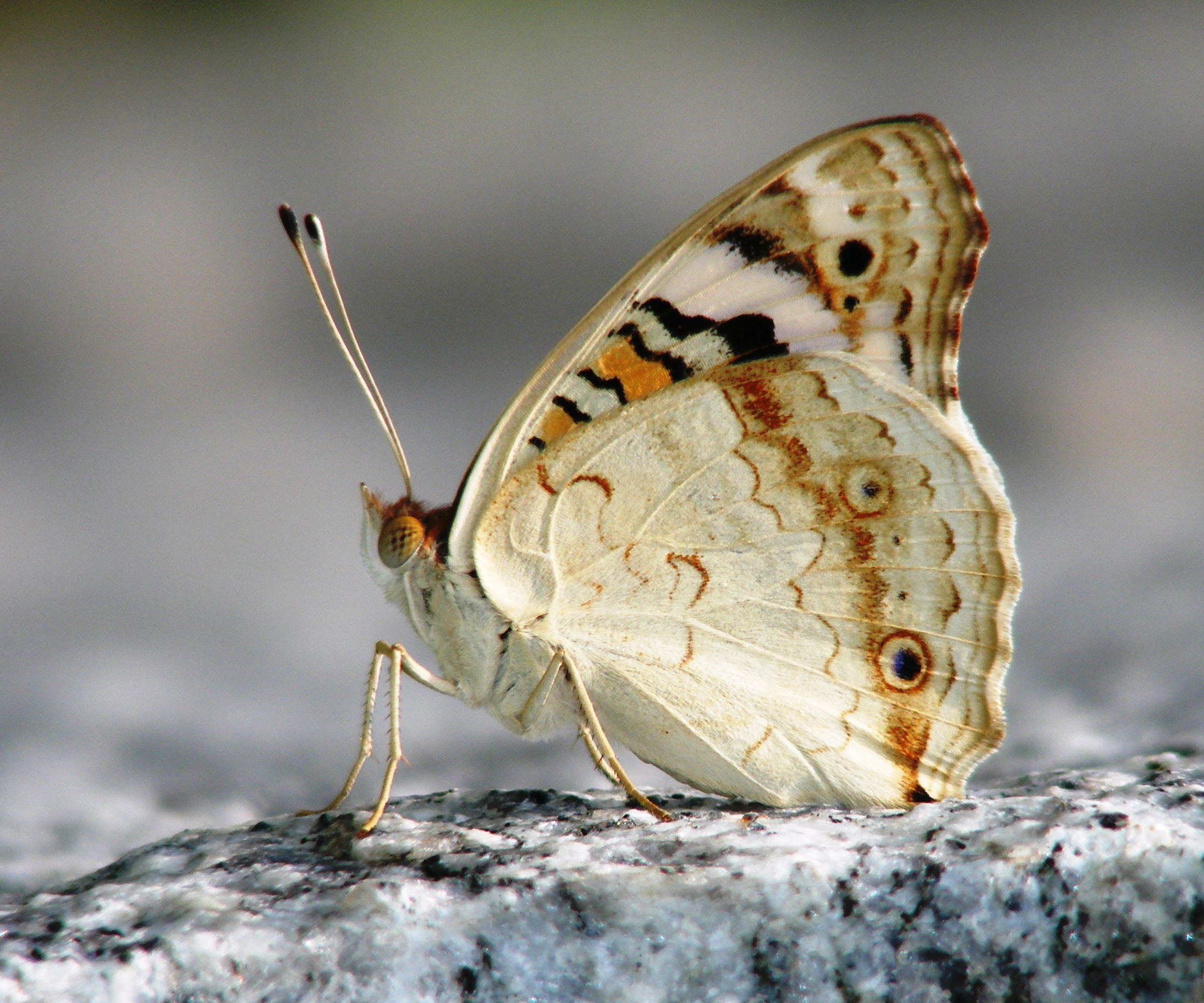
Ventral view (male)

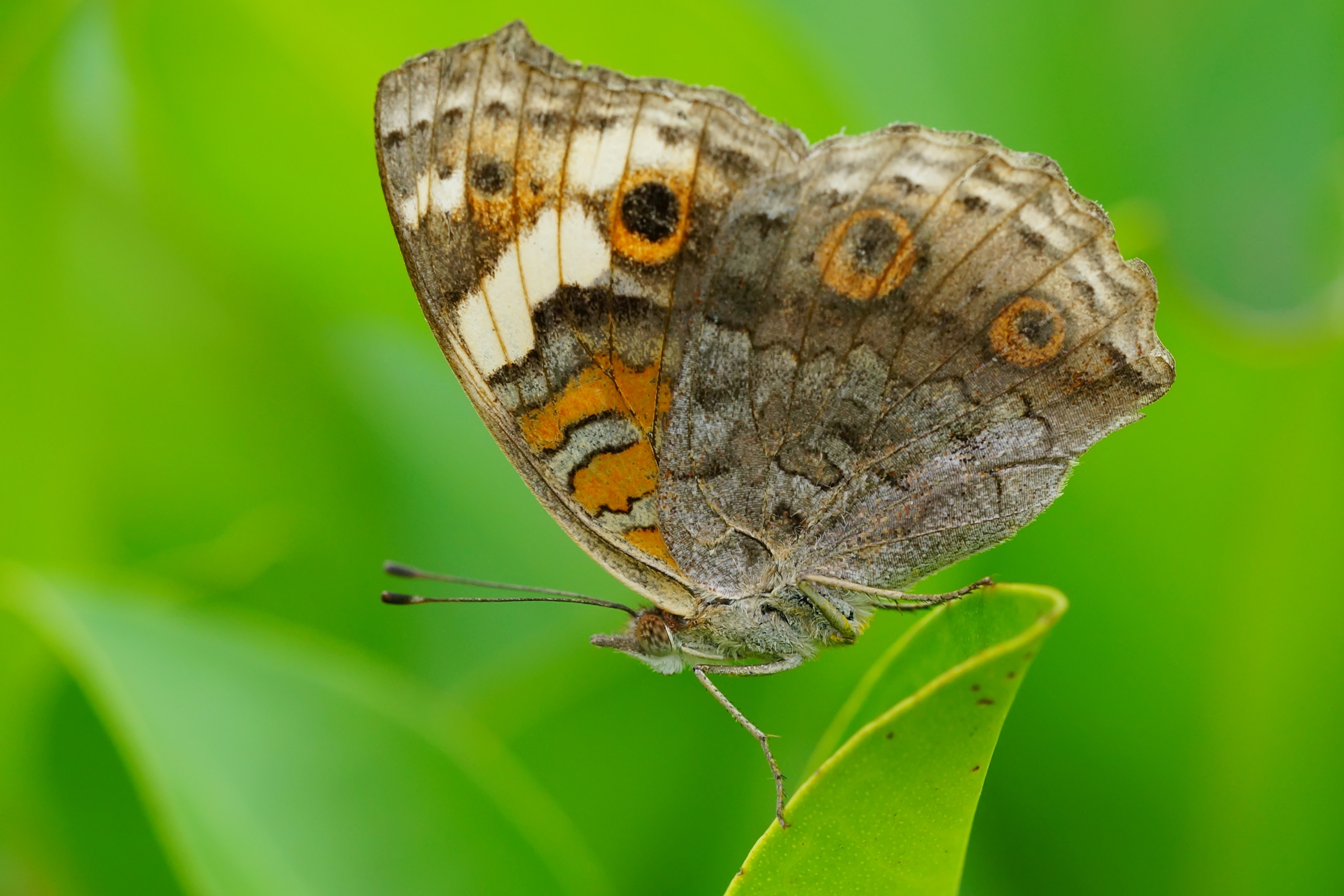
Ventral view (female)

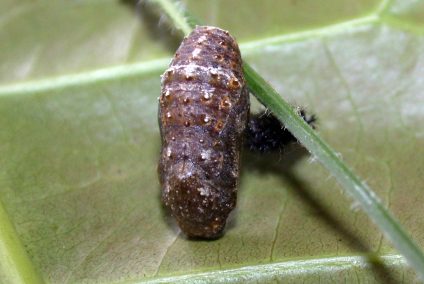
Pupa

==== Genus: Kallima (oakleaves) ====
===== Kallima horsfieldii (South-Indian/Sahyadri blue oakleaf) =====
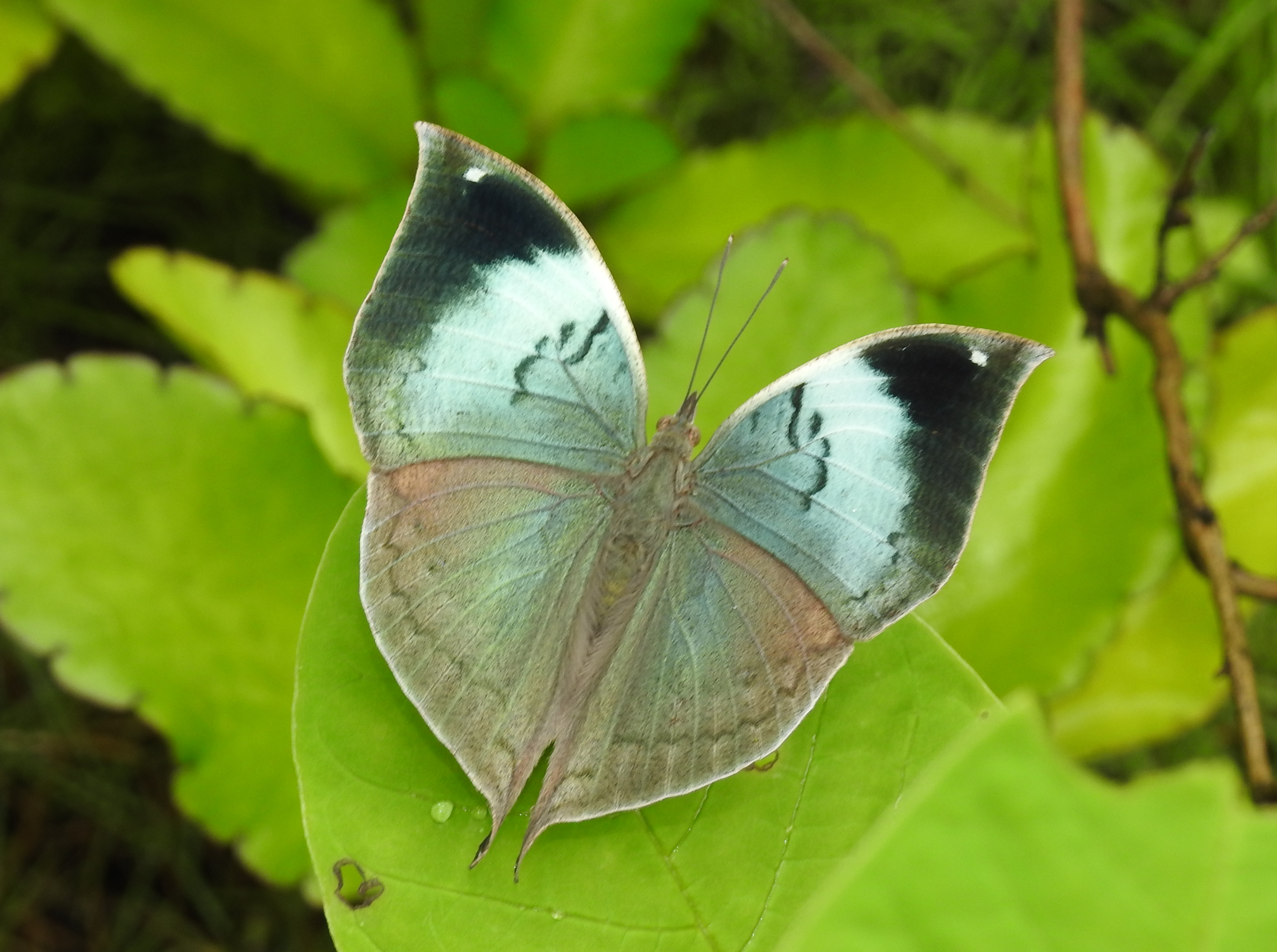
Dorsal view

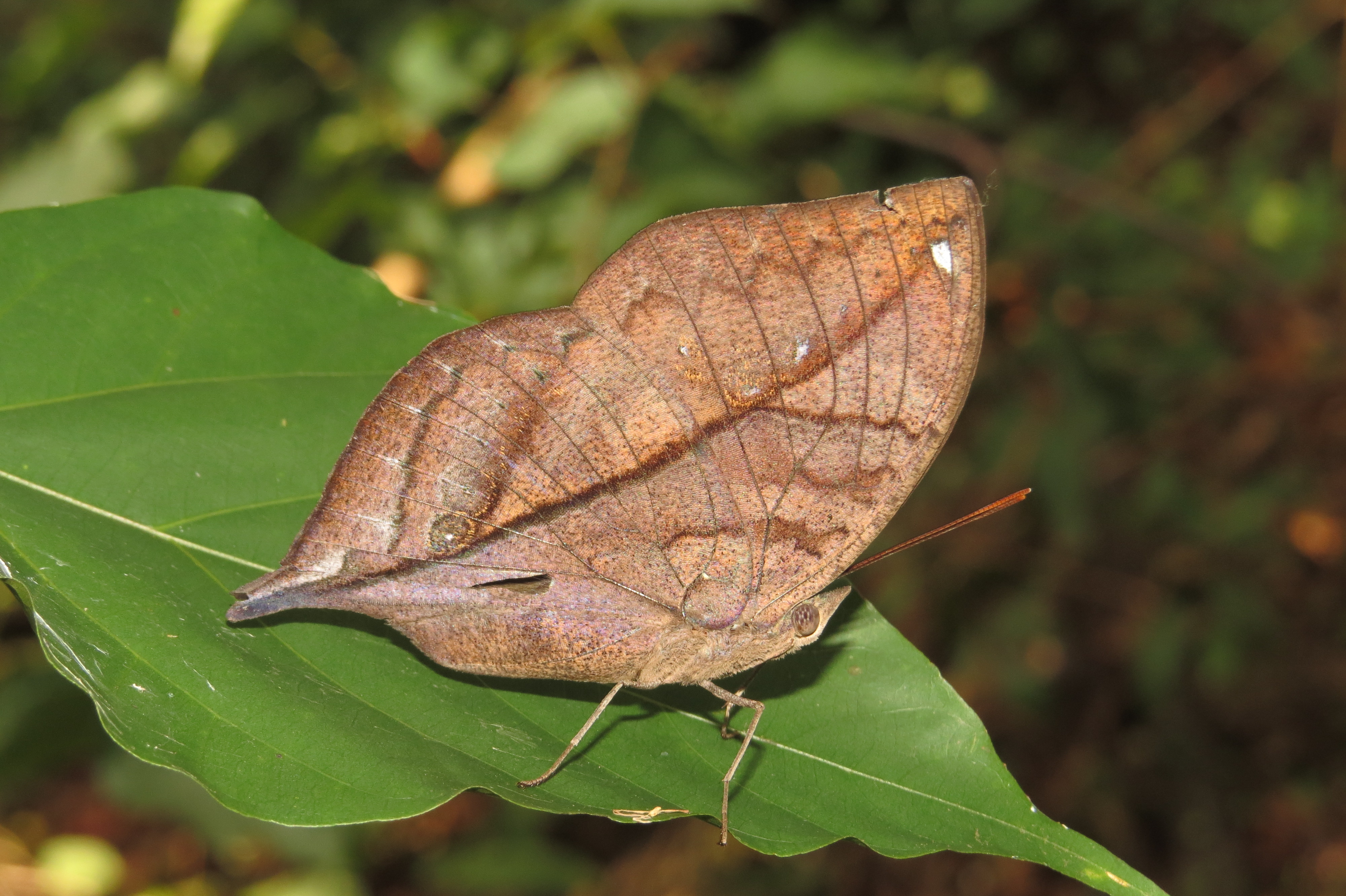
Ventral view

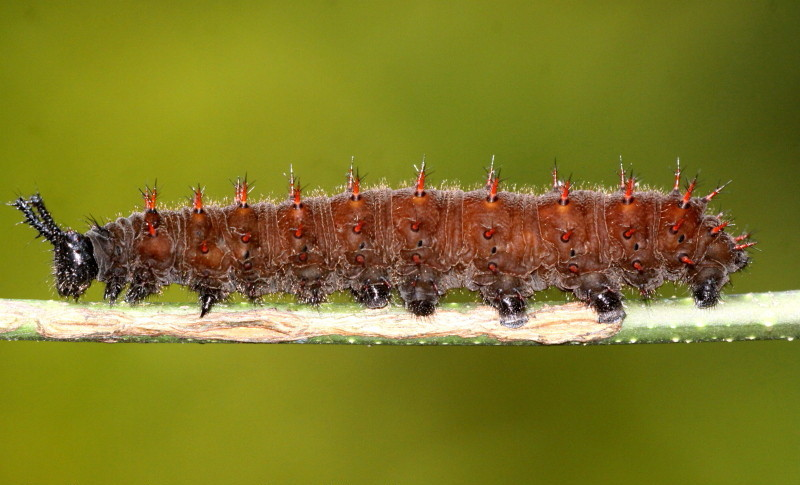
Larva

==== Genus: Kaniska ====
===== Kaniska canace (blue admiral) =====
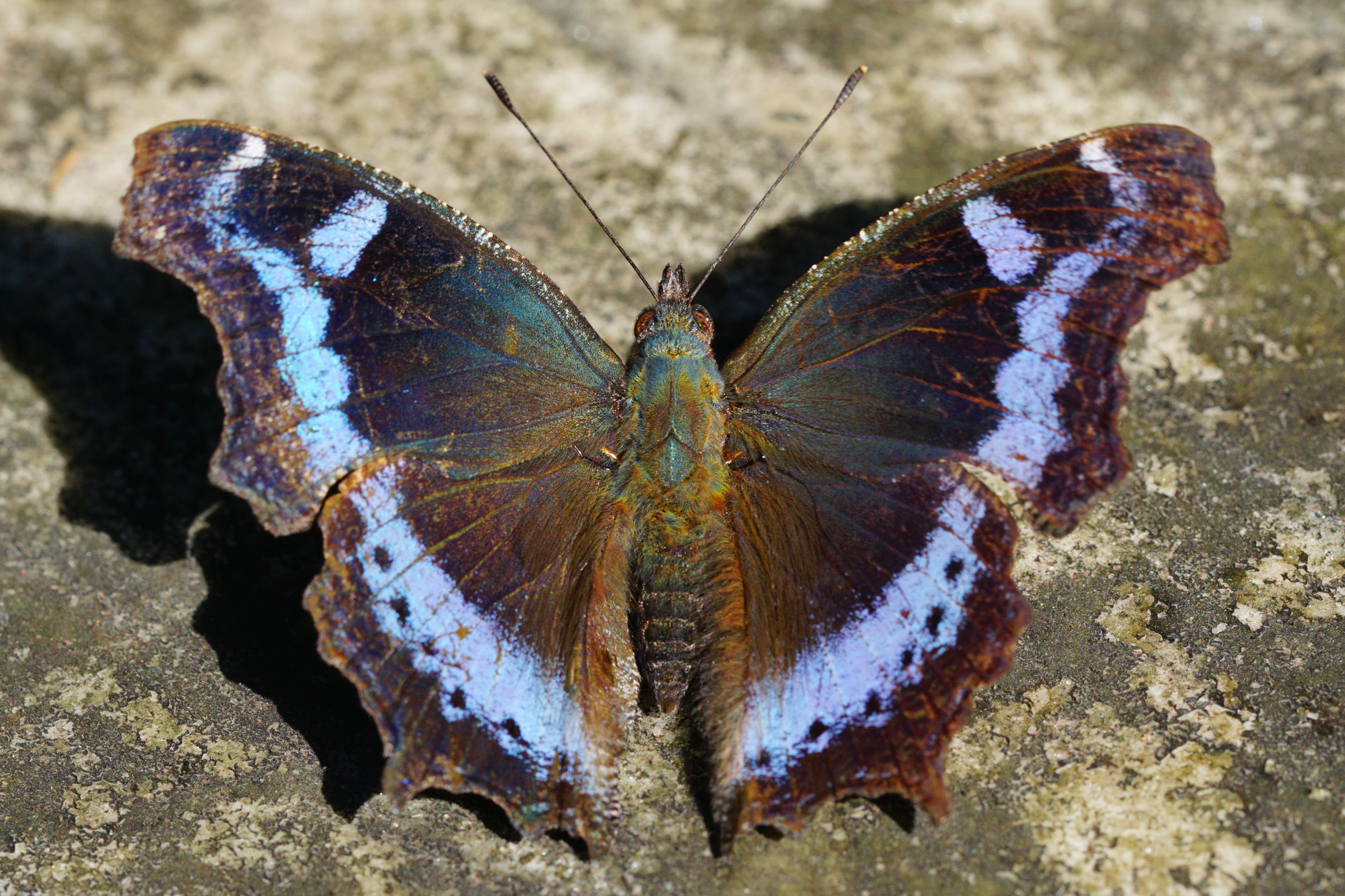
Dorsal view

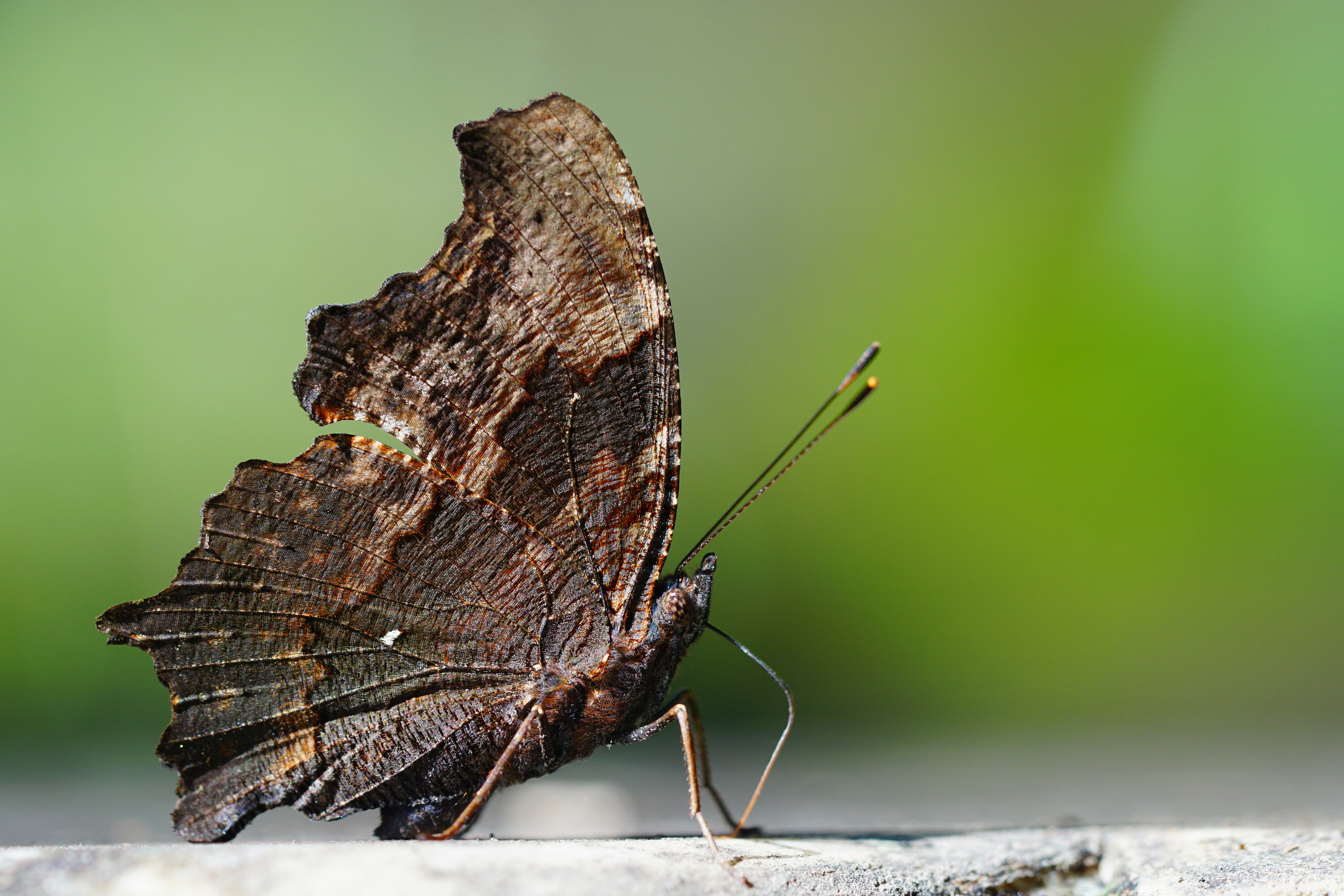
Ventral view

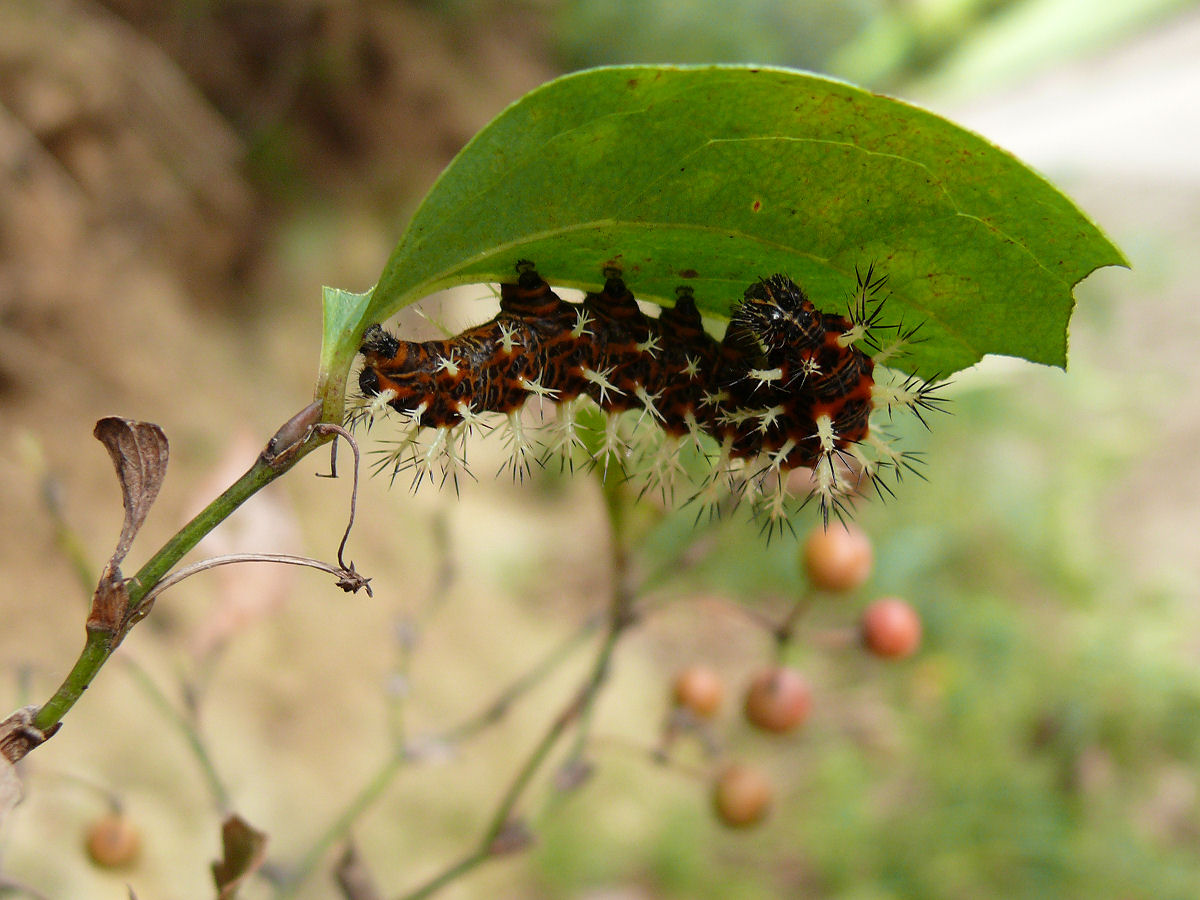
Larva

==== Genus: Vanessa (admirals, ladies) ====
===== Vanessa cardui (painted lady) =====
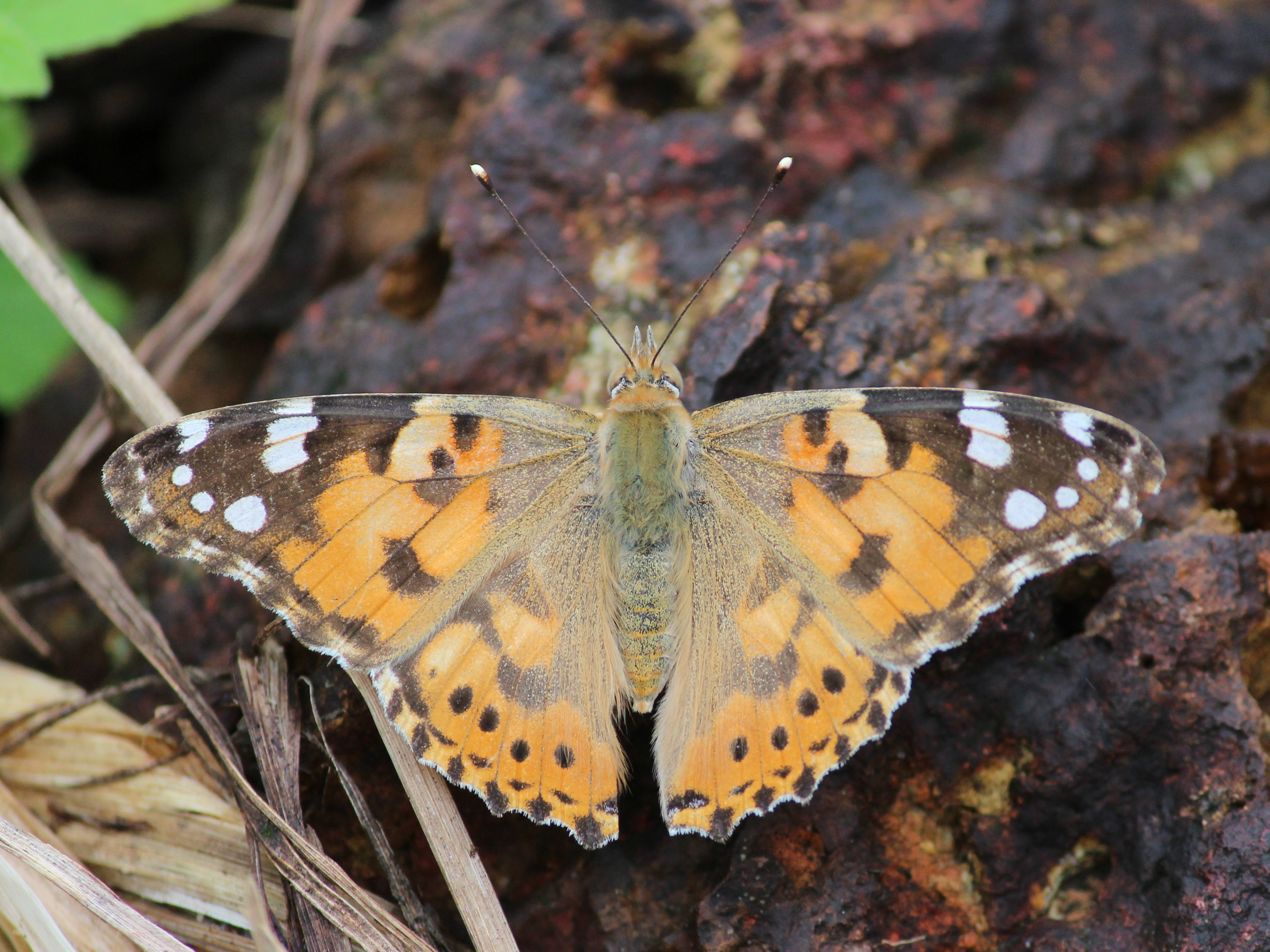
Dorsal view

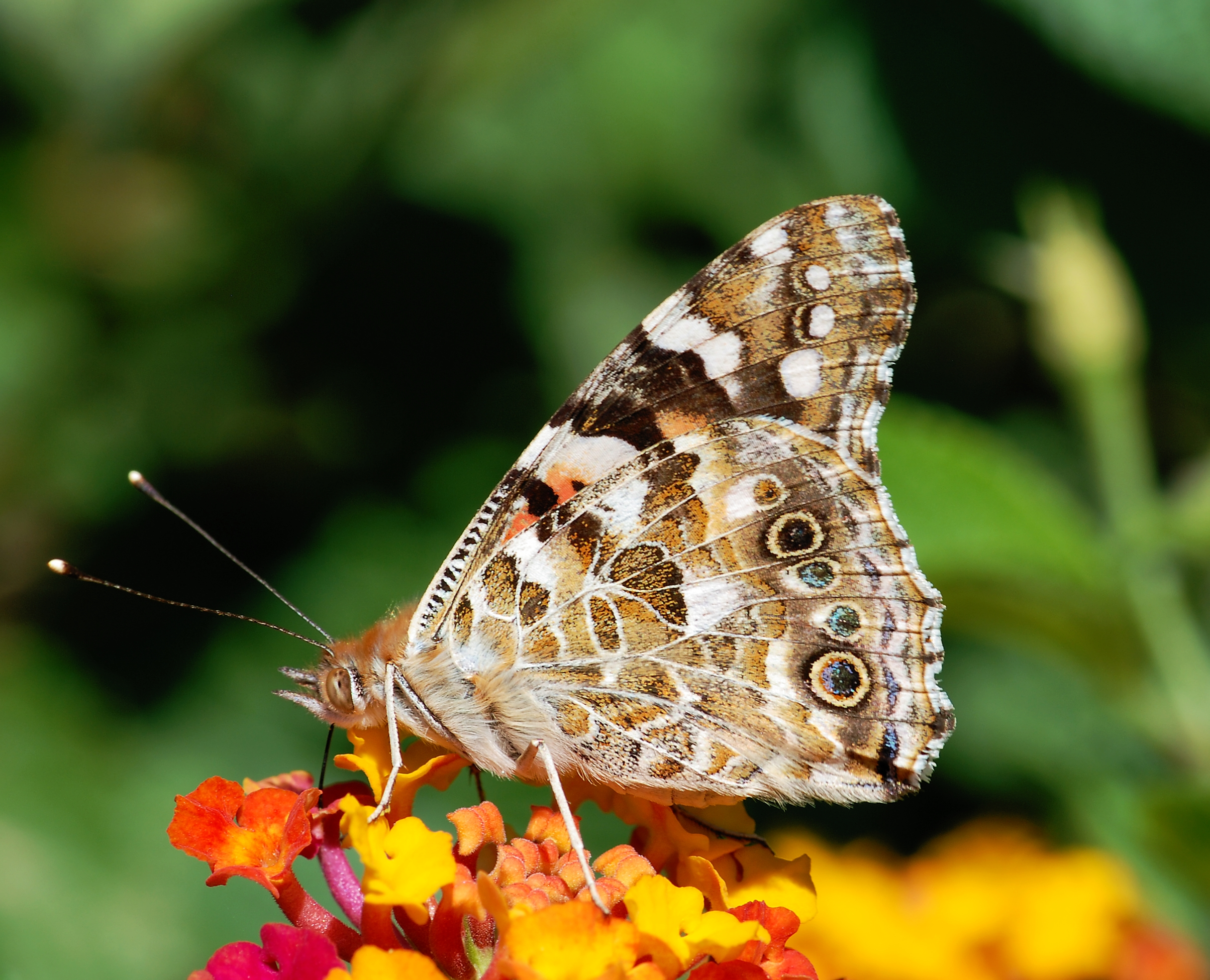
Ventral view

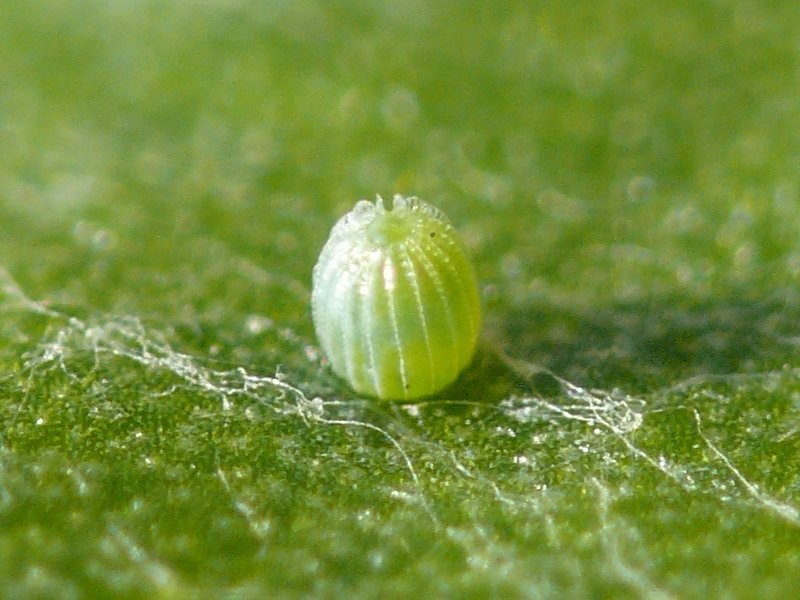
Egg

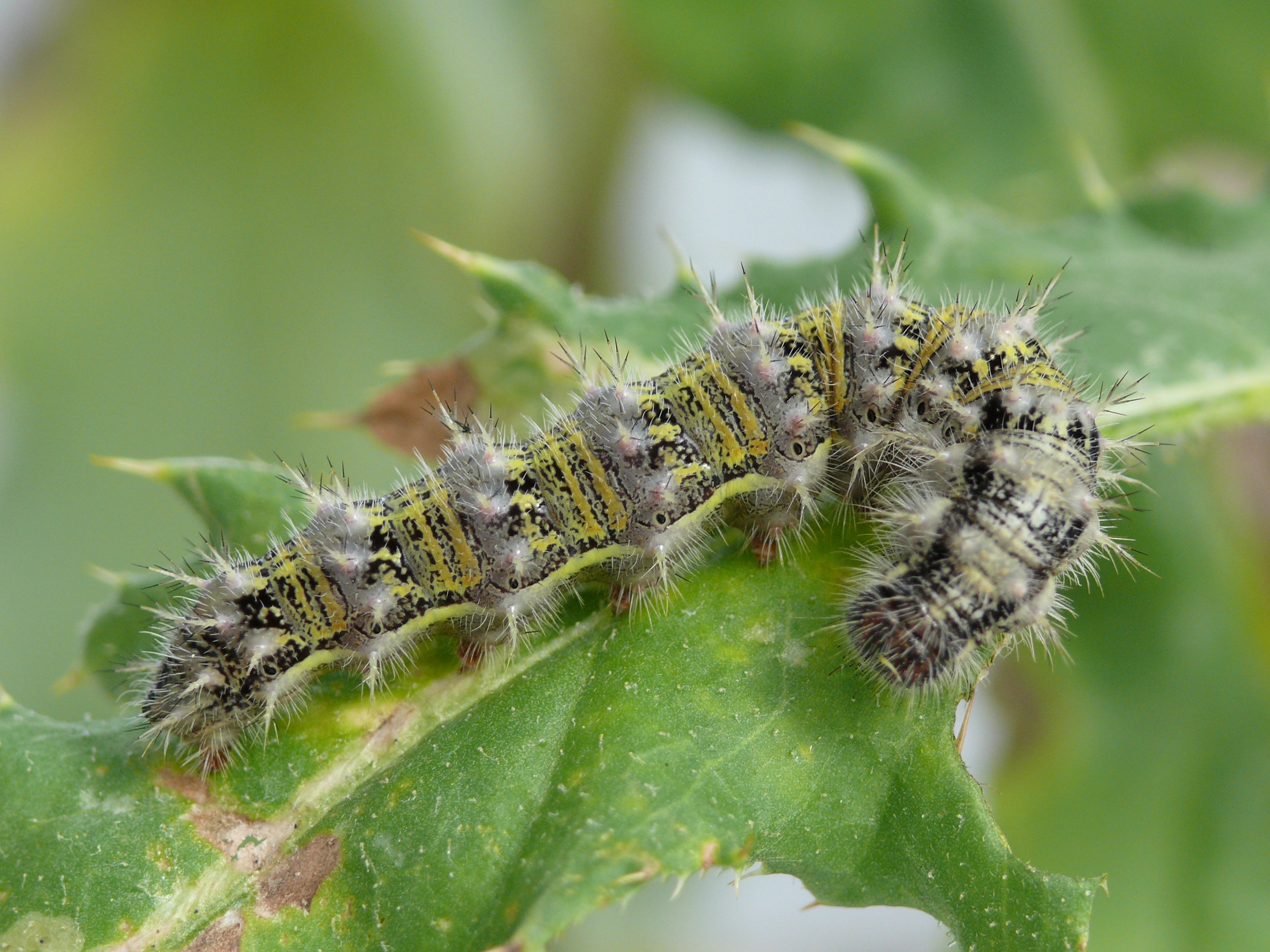
Larva

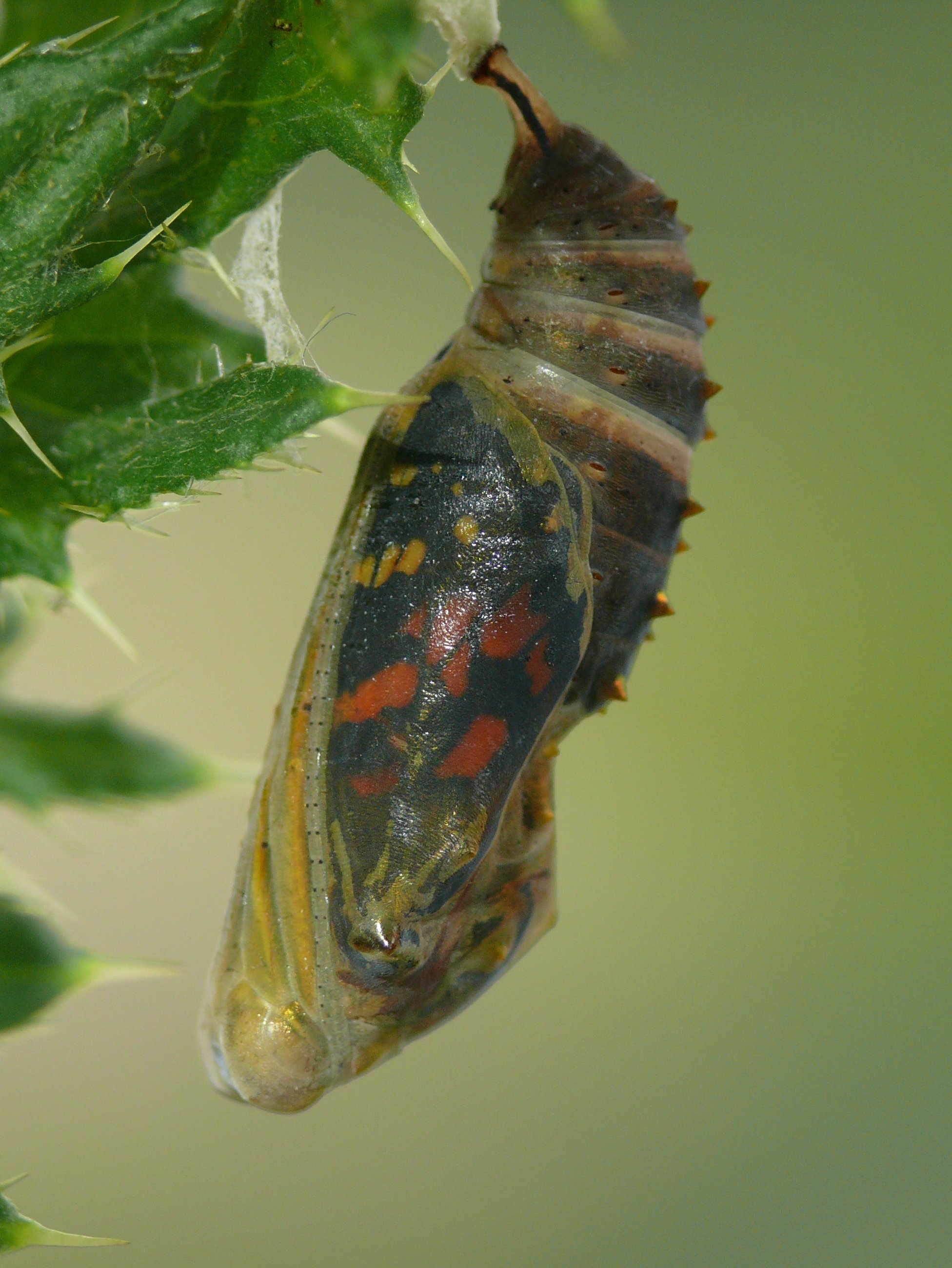
Pupa

===== Vanessa indica (Indian red admiral) =====
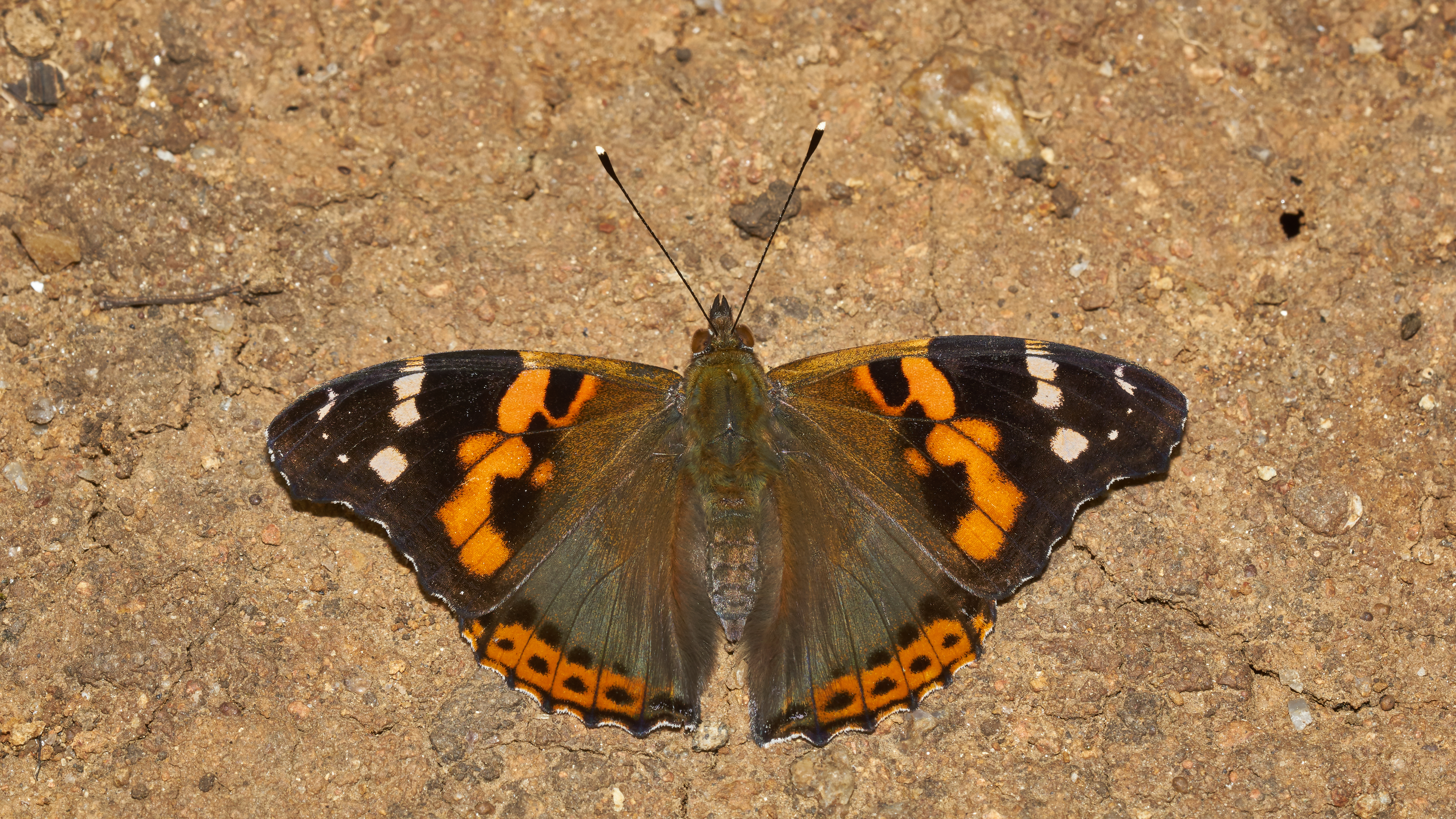
Dorsal view

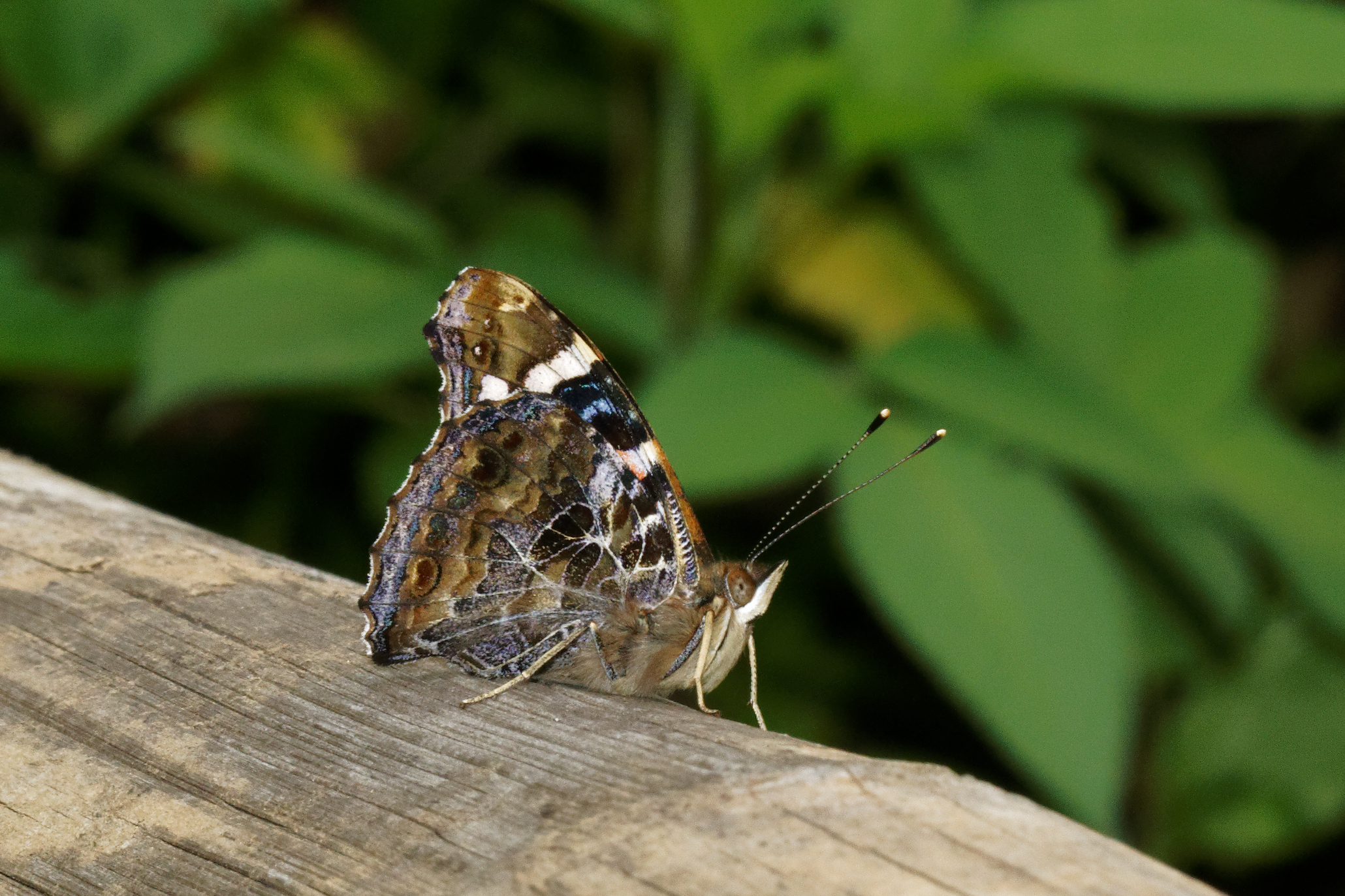
Ventral view

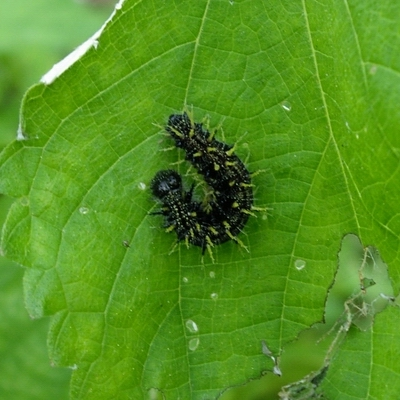
Larva

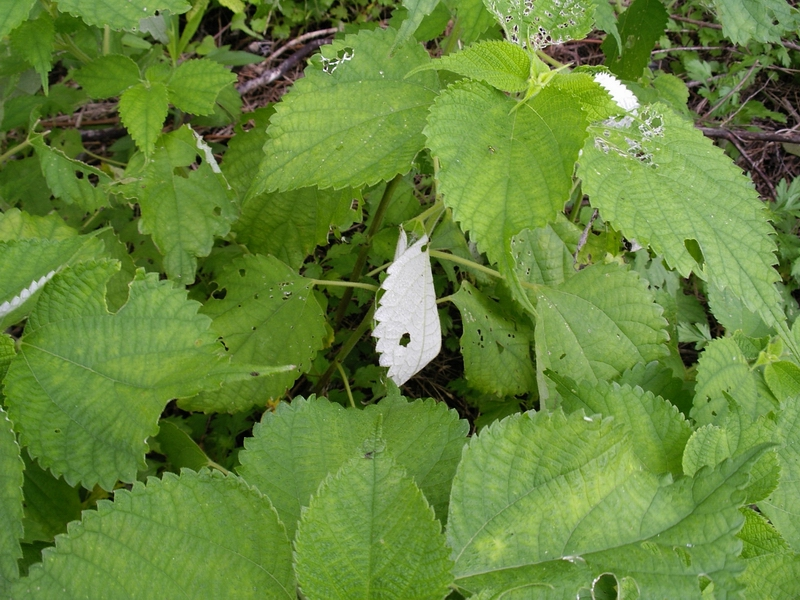
Larva case

=== Subfamily: Satyrinae ===
==== Genus: Amathusia (palmkings) ====
===== Amathusia phidippus (palmking) =====
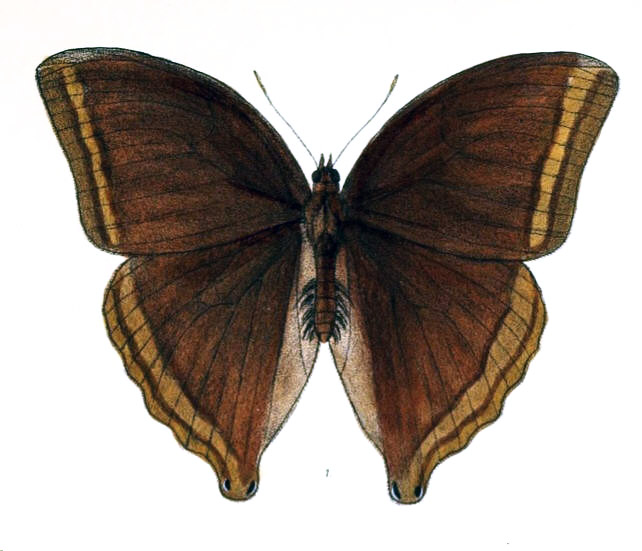
Dorsal view

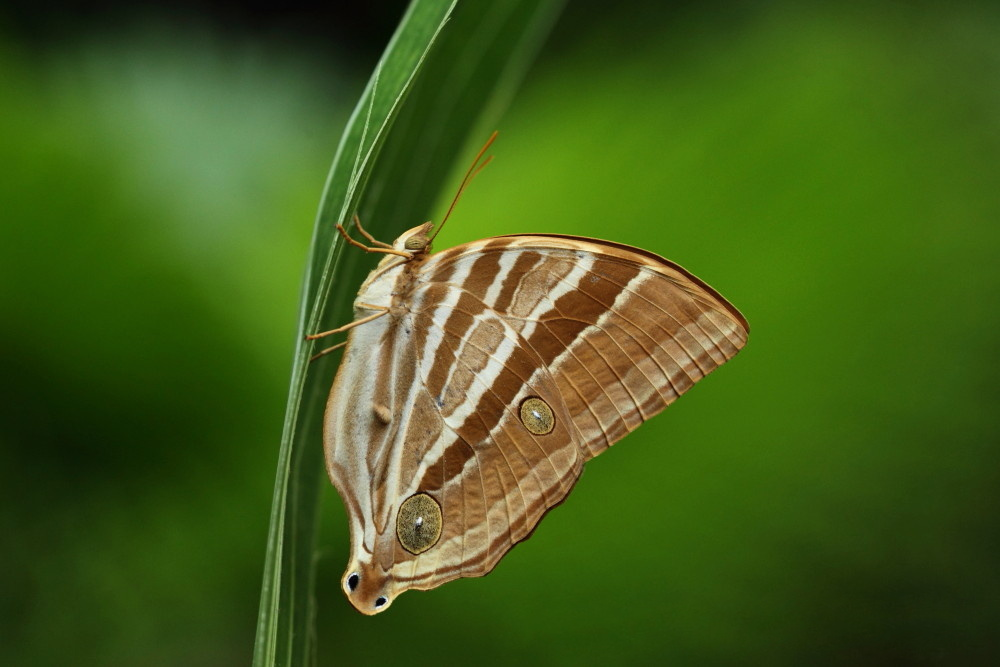
Ventral view

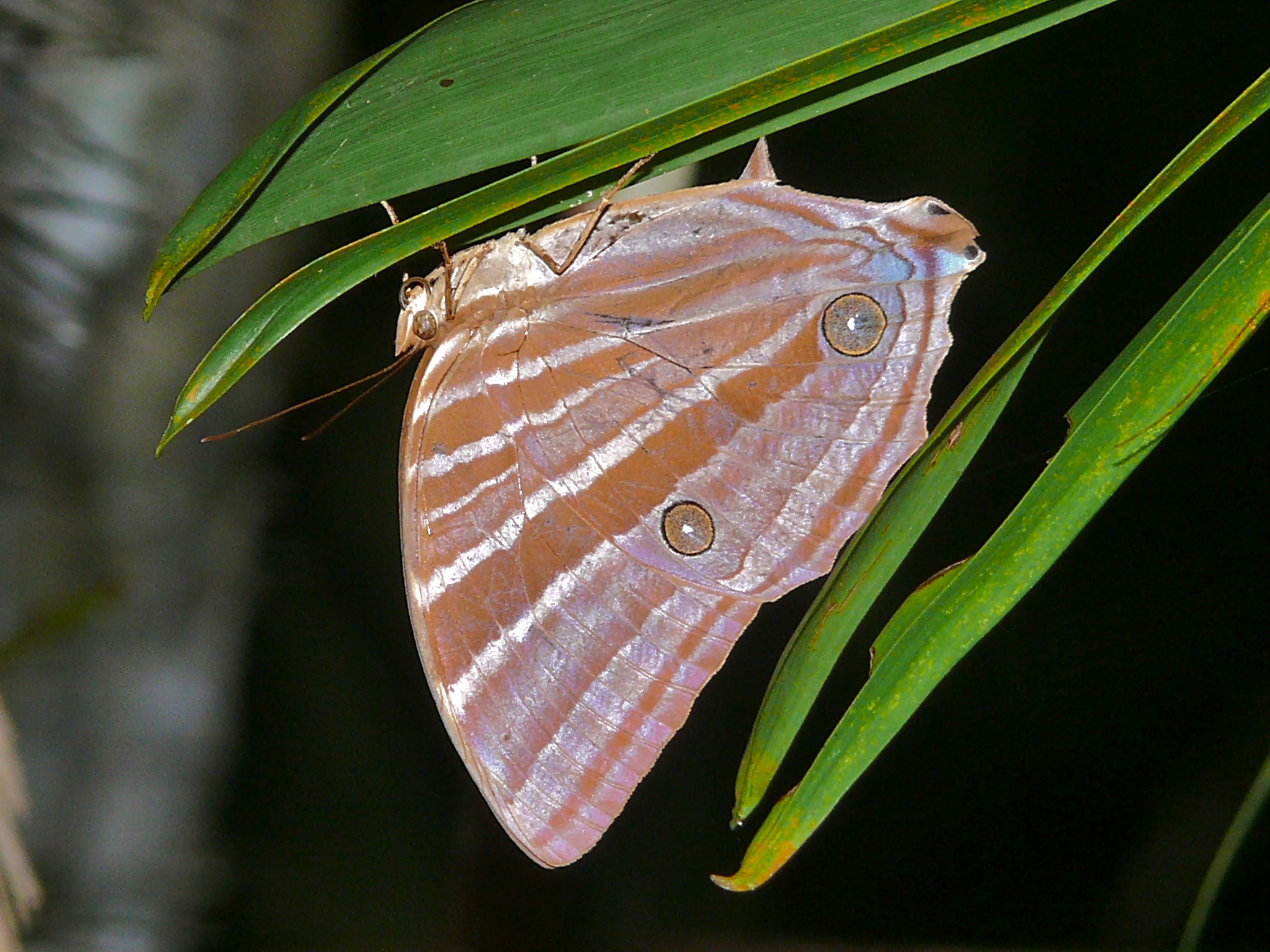
Ventral view

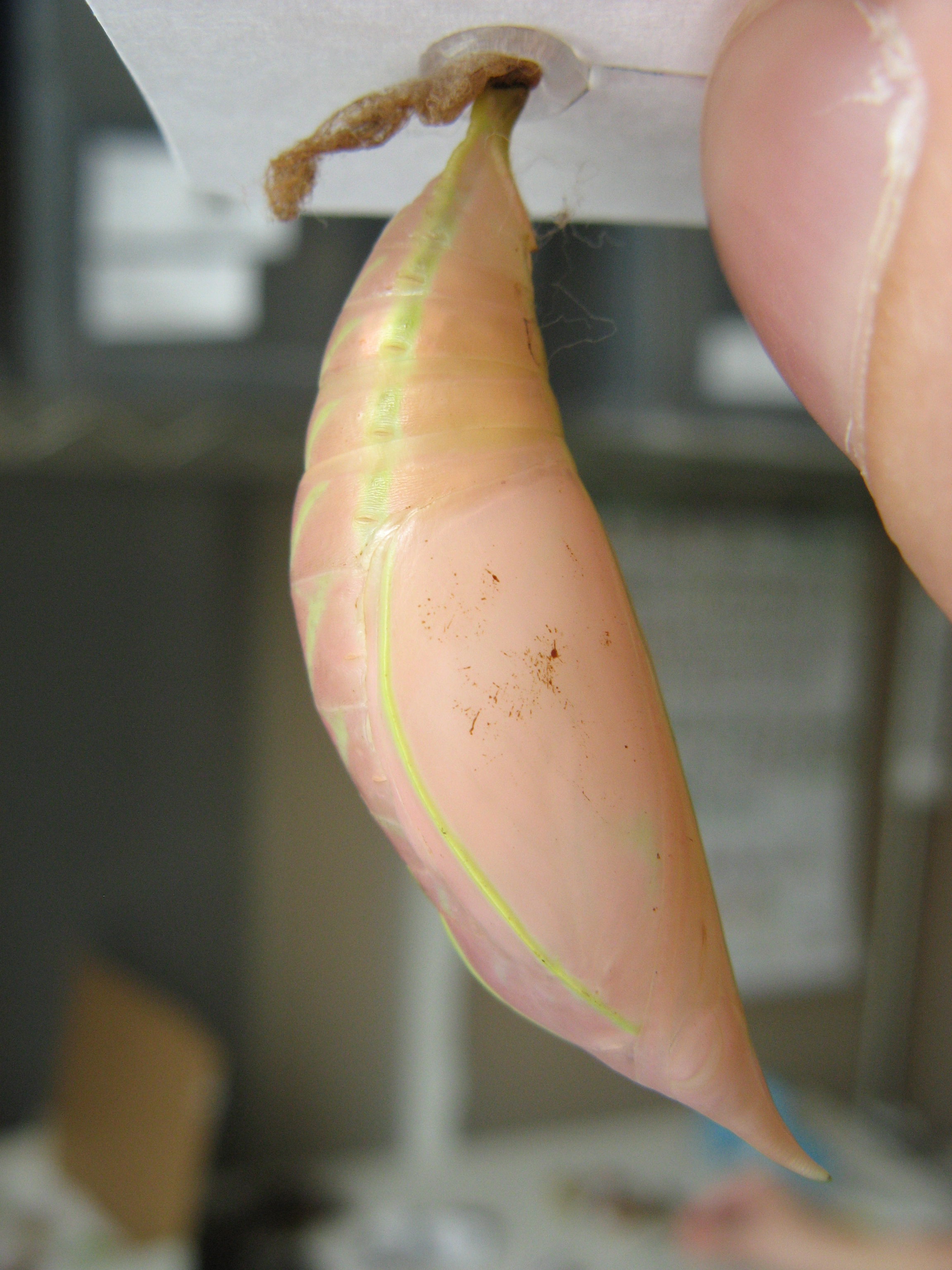
Pupa

==== Genus: Discophora (duffers) ====
===== Discophora lepida (southern duffer) =====
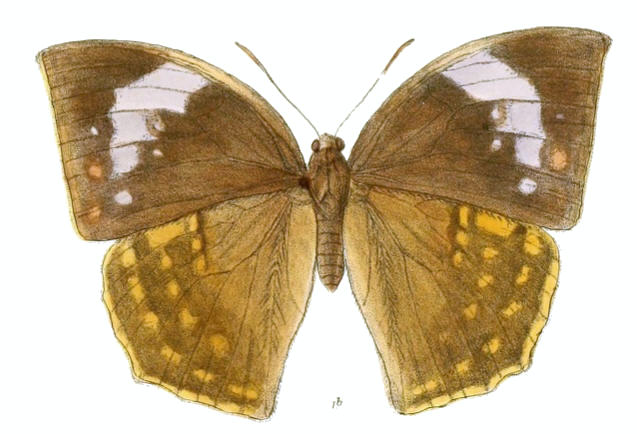
Dorsal view

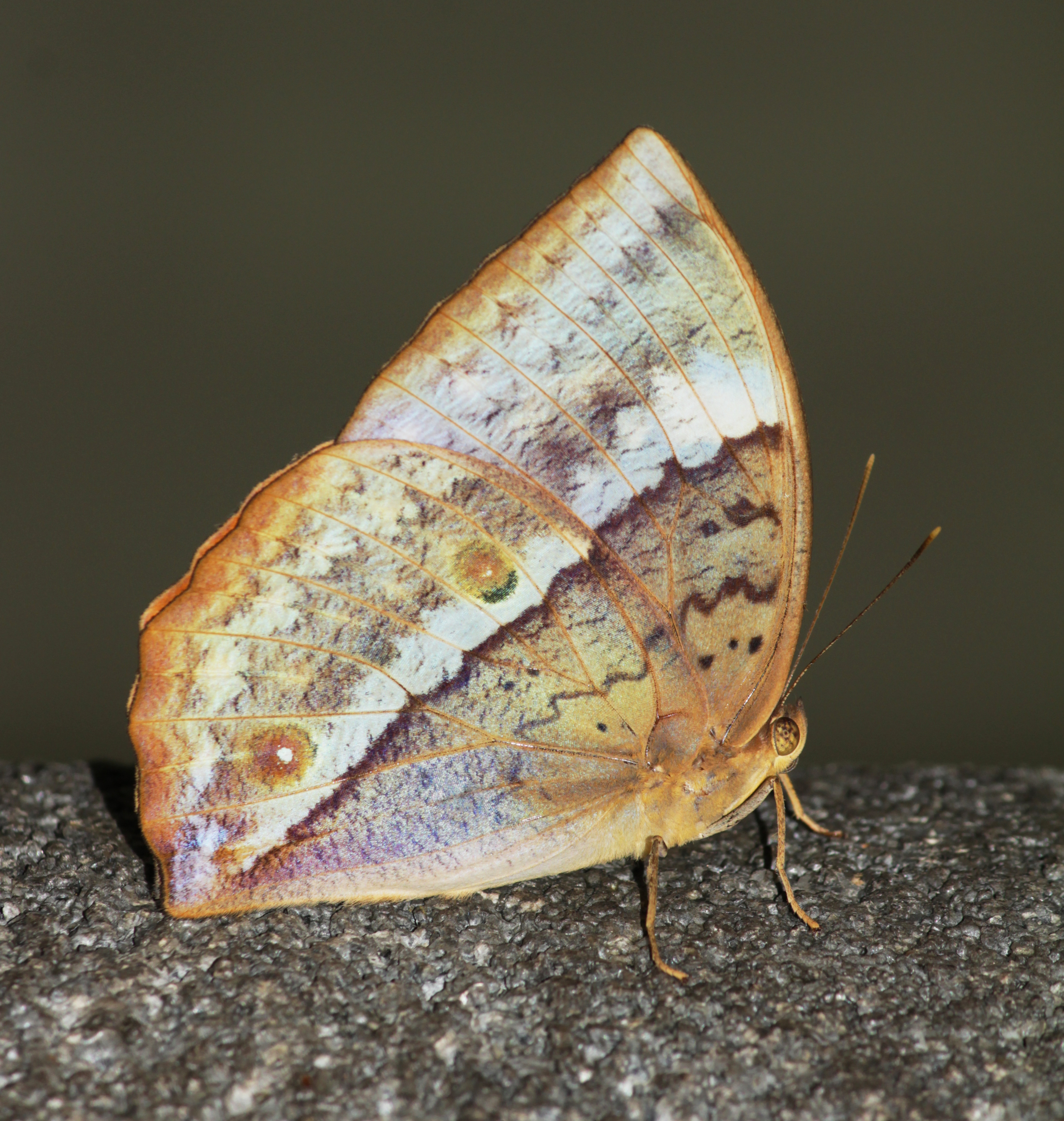
Ventral view

==== Genus: Elymnias (palmflies) ====
===== Elymnias caudata (tailed palmfly) =====
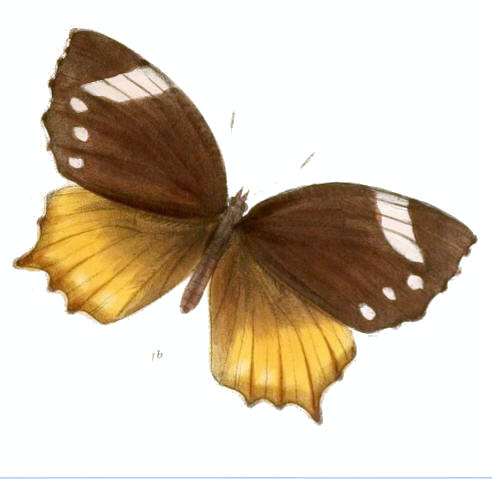
Dorsal view (male)

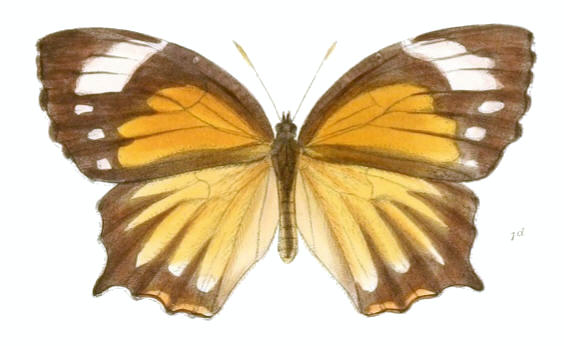
Dorsal view (female)

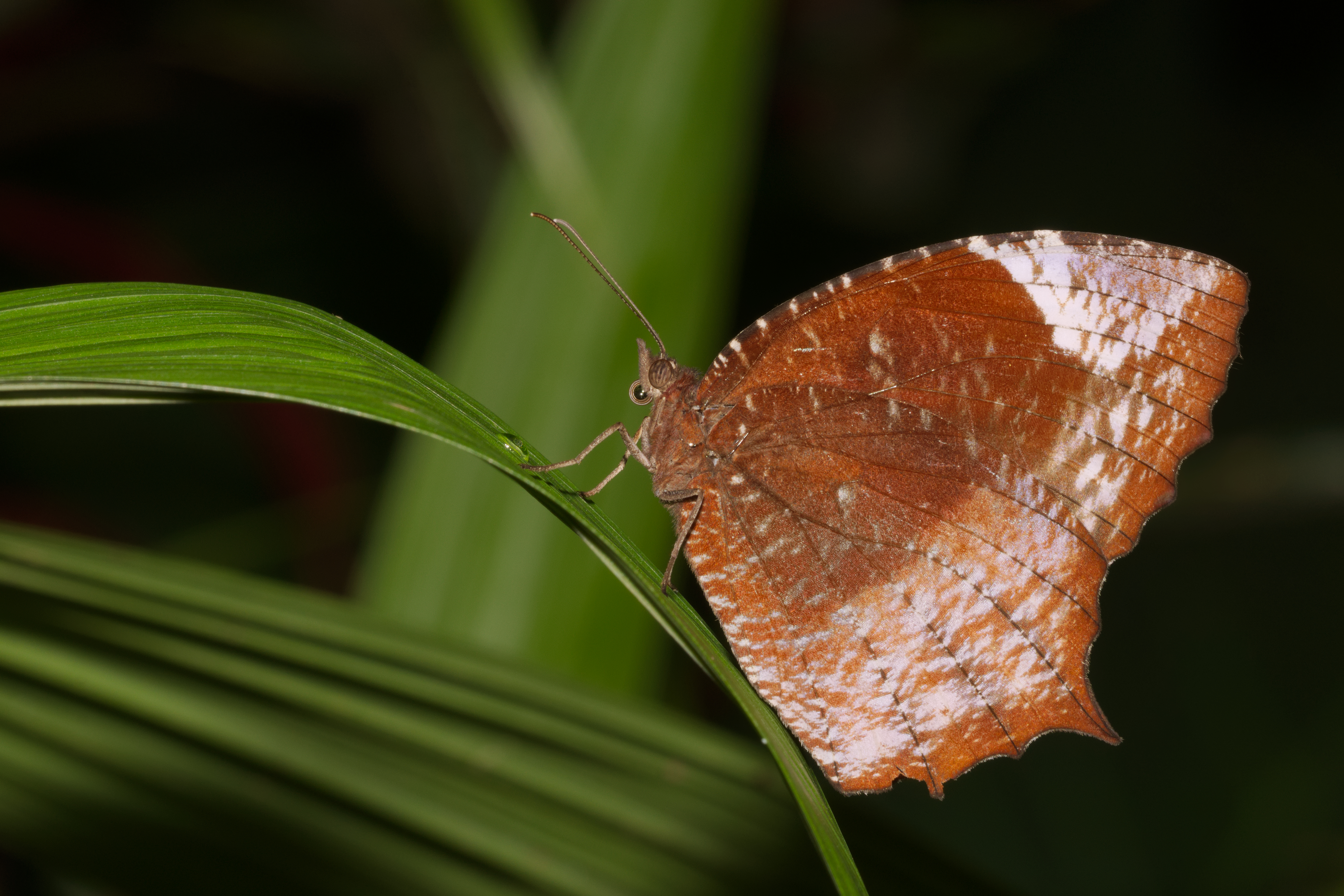
Ventral view

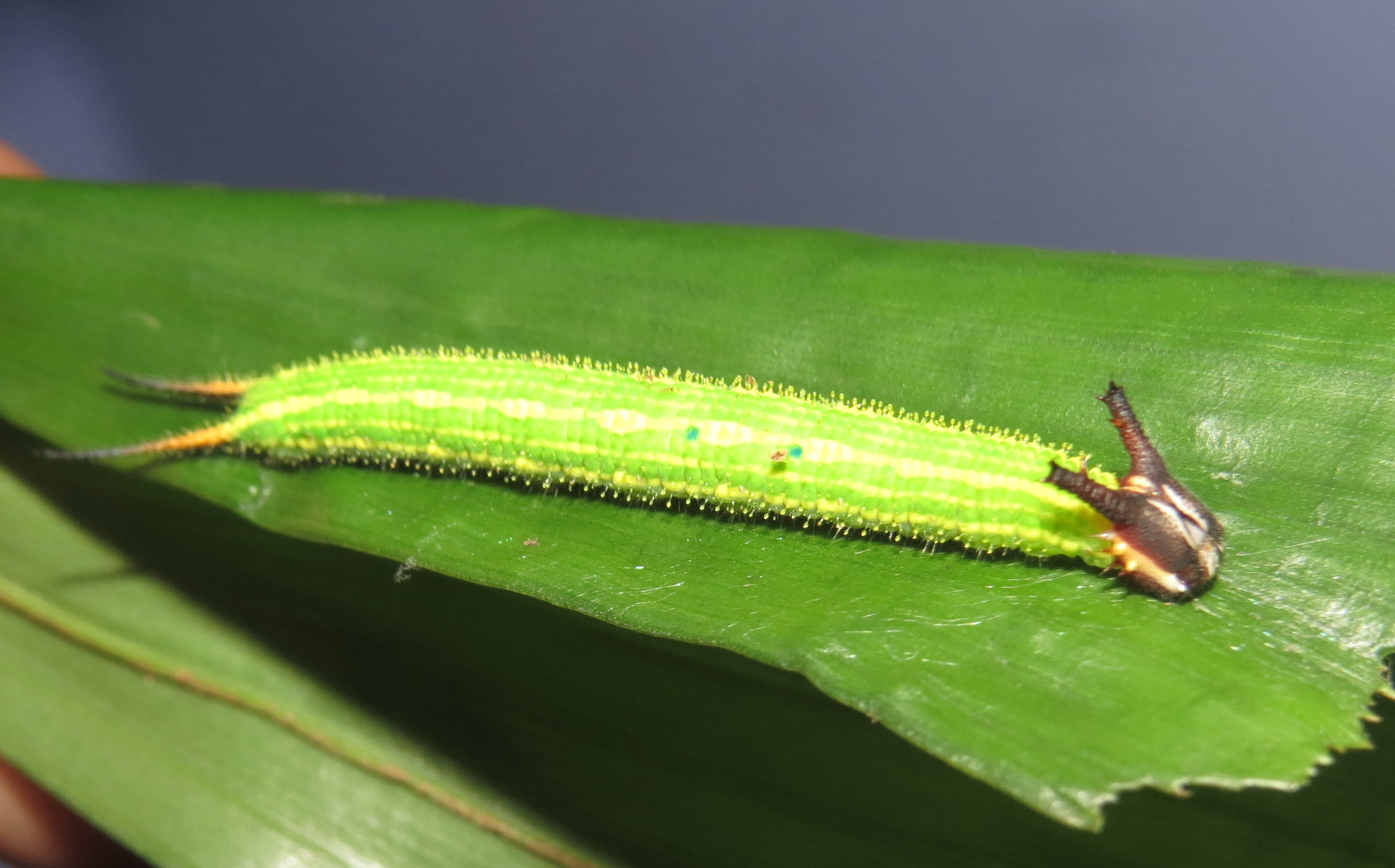
Larva

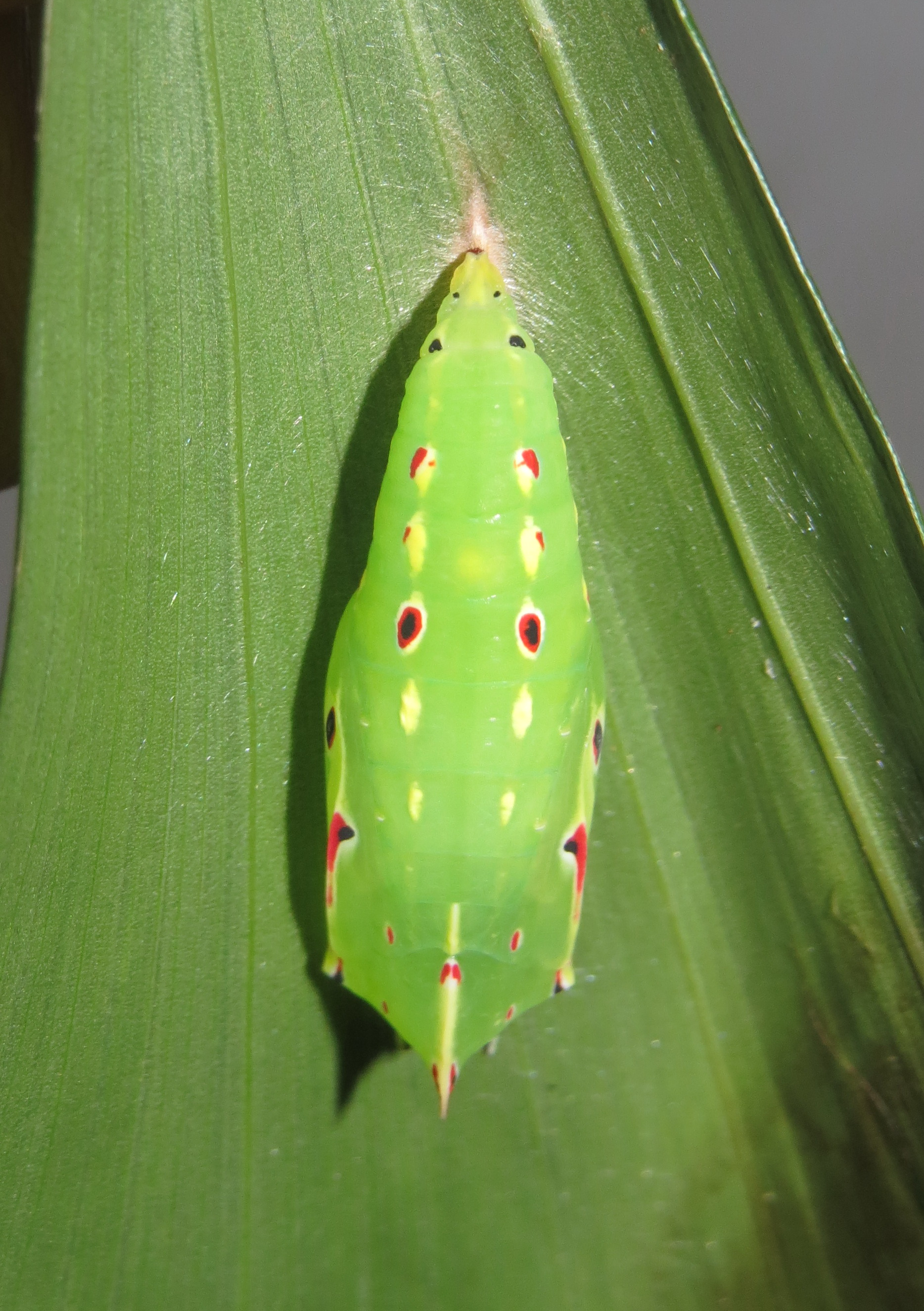
Pupa

==== Genus: Heteropsis ====
===== Heteropsis/Telinga adolphei (redeye bushbrown) =====
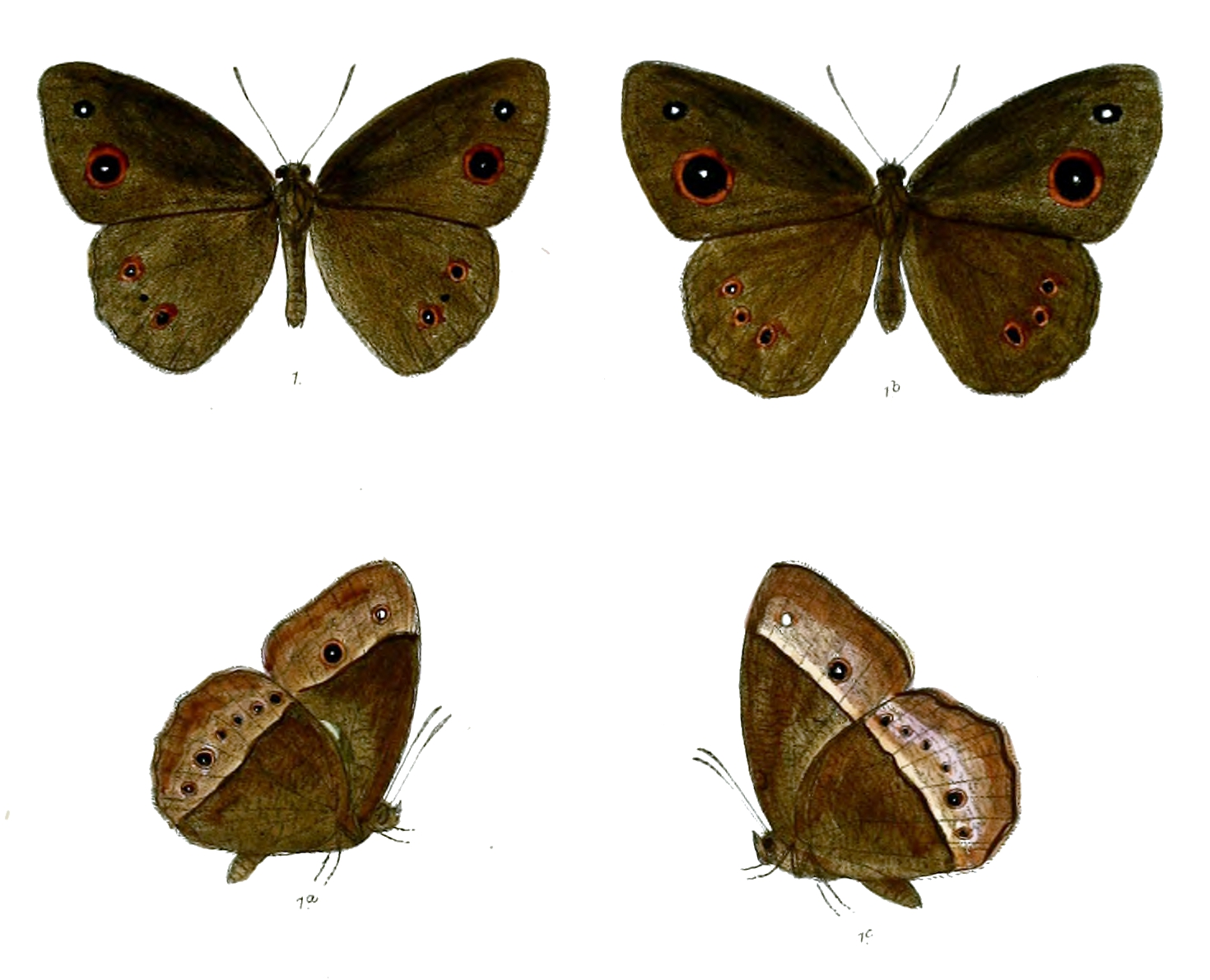
Illustration

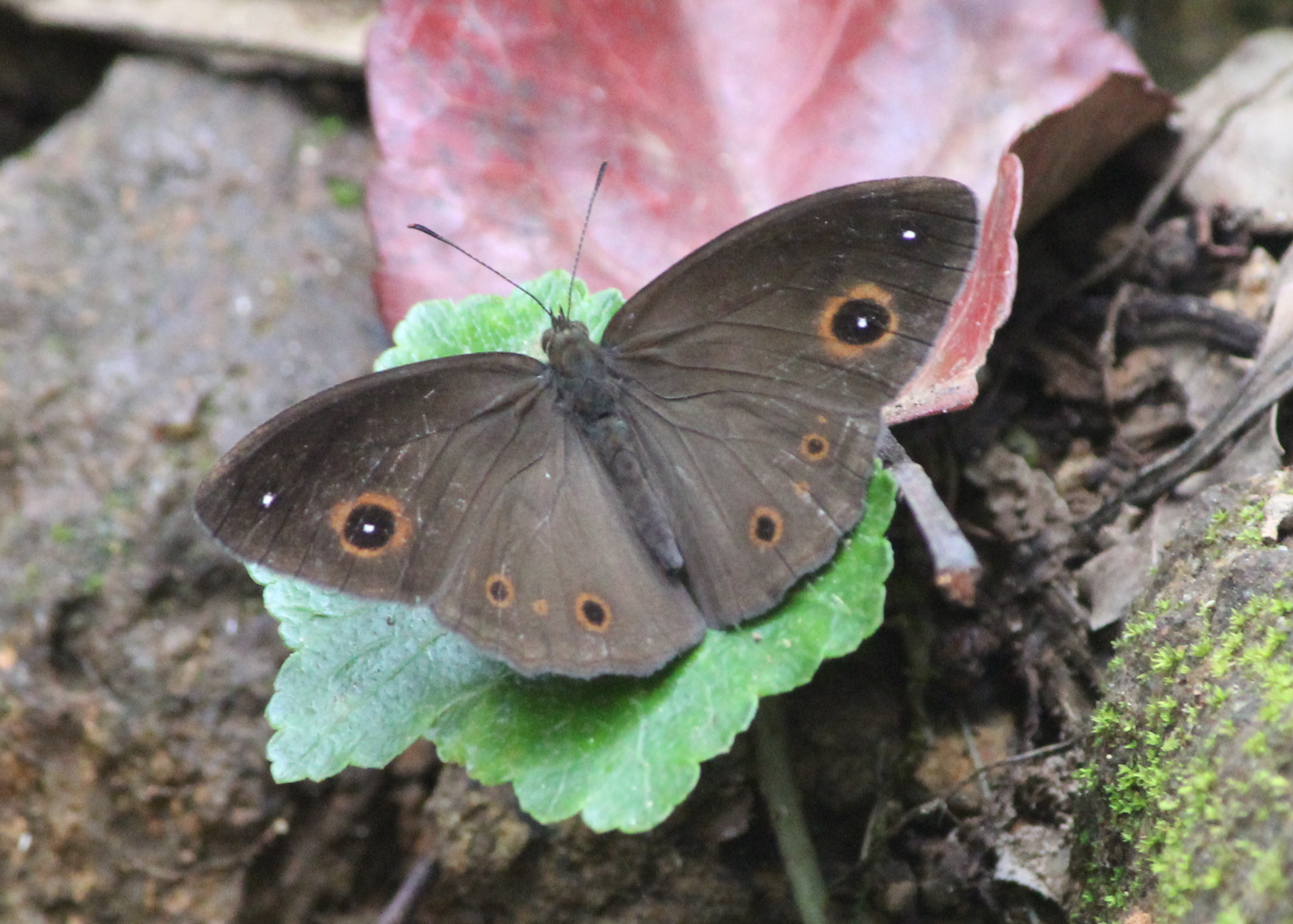
Dorsal view

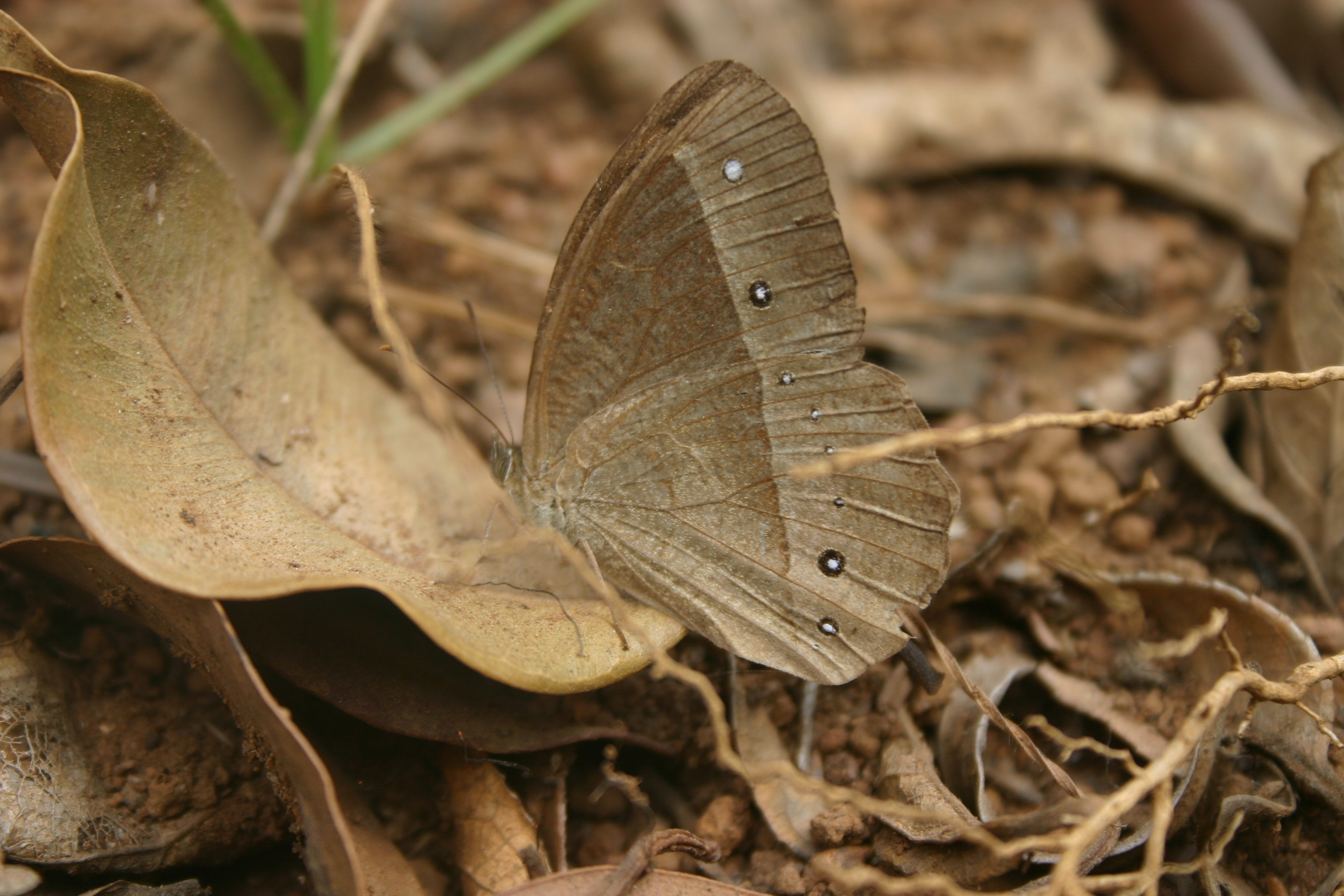
Ventral view

===== Heteropsis/Telinga davisoni (Palni bushbrown) =====
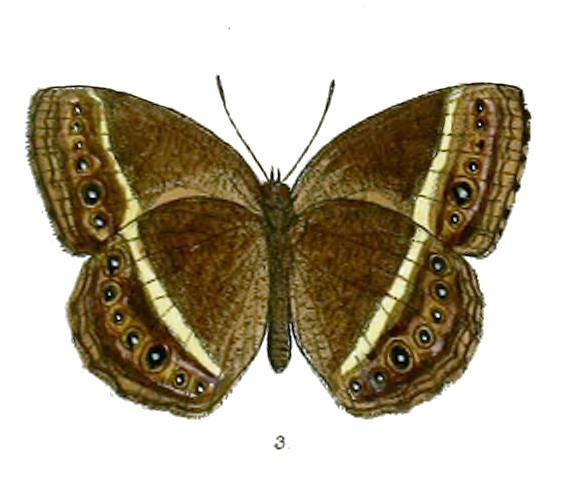
Illustration

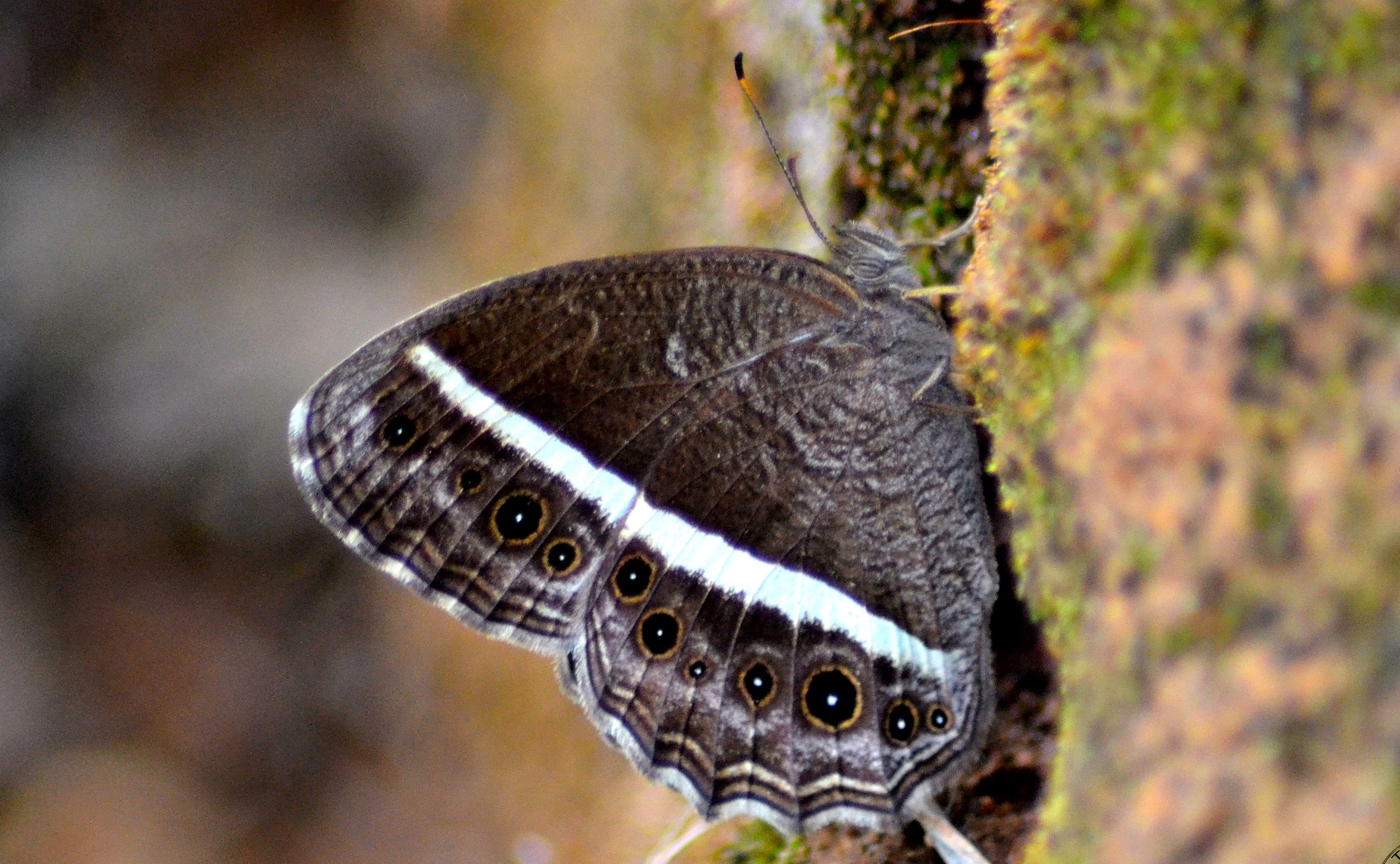
Ventral view

==== Genus: Lethe (treebrowns) ====
===== Lethe drypetis (Tamil treebrown) =====
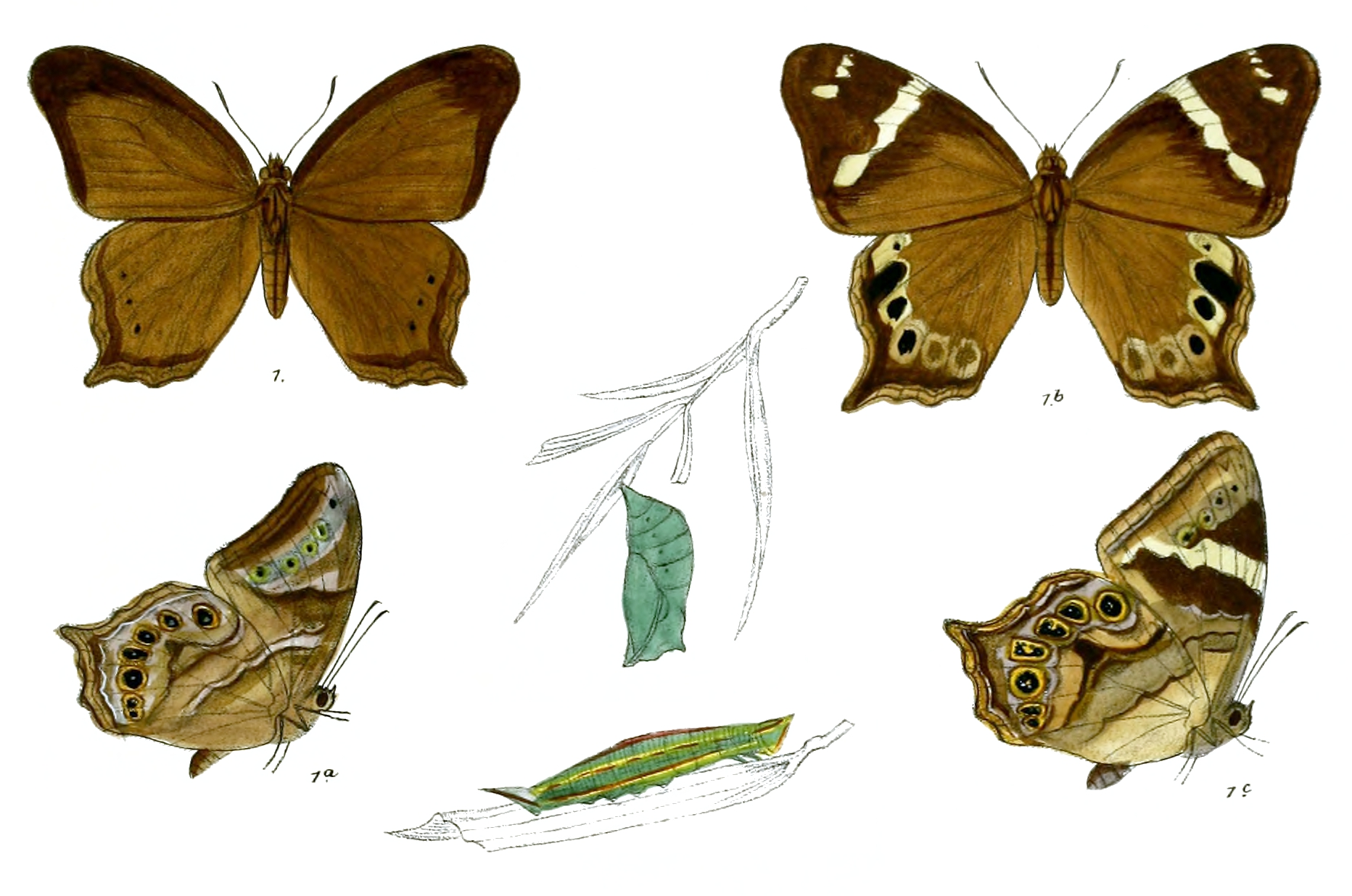
Illustration

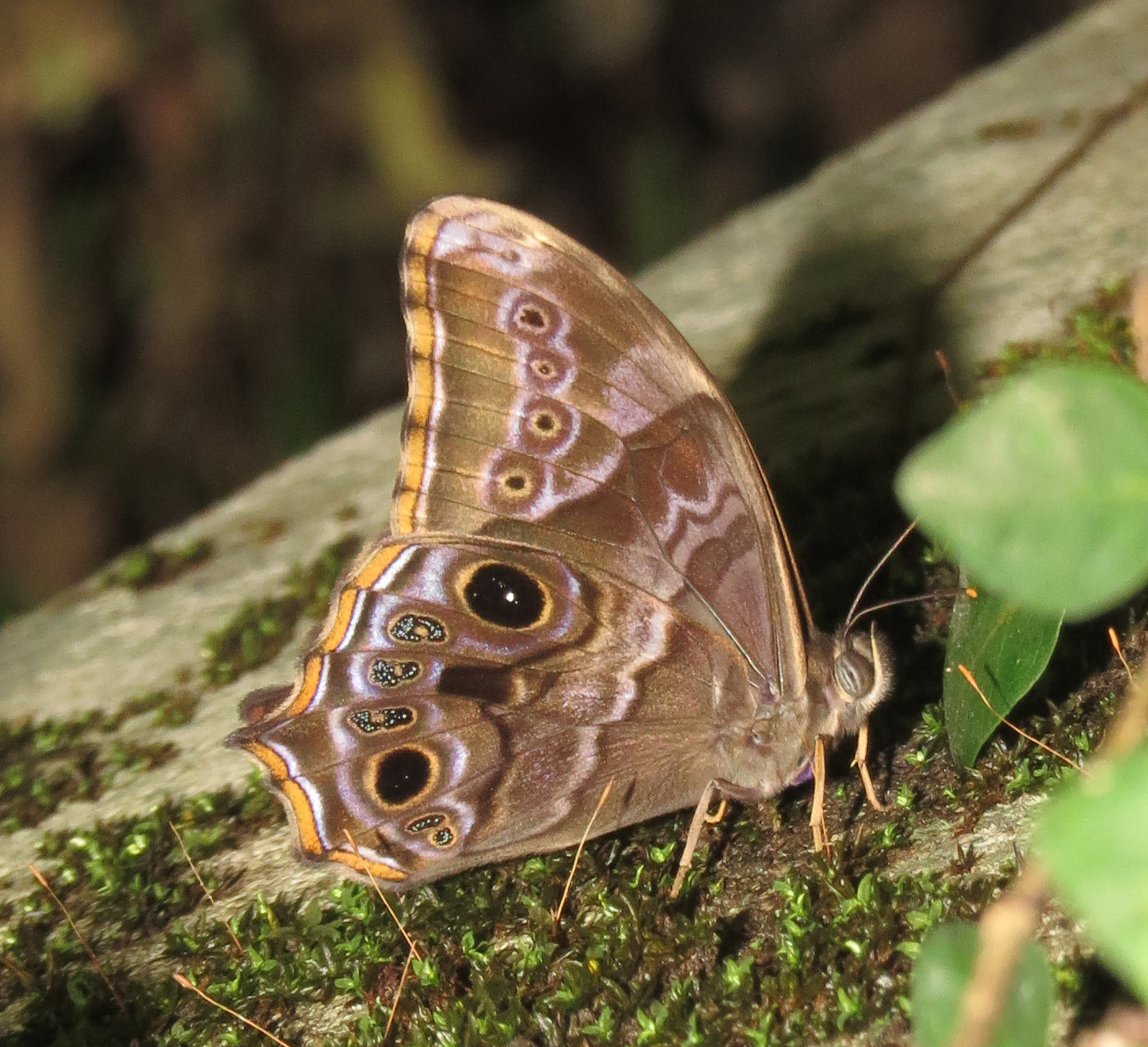
Ventral view

===== Lethe europa (bamboo treebrown) =====
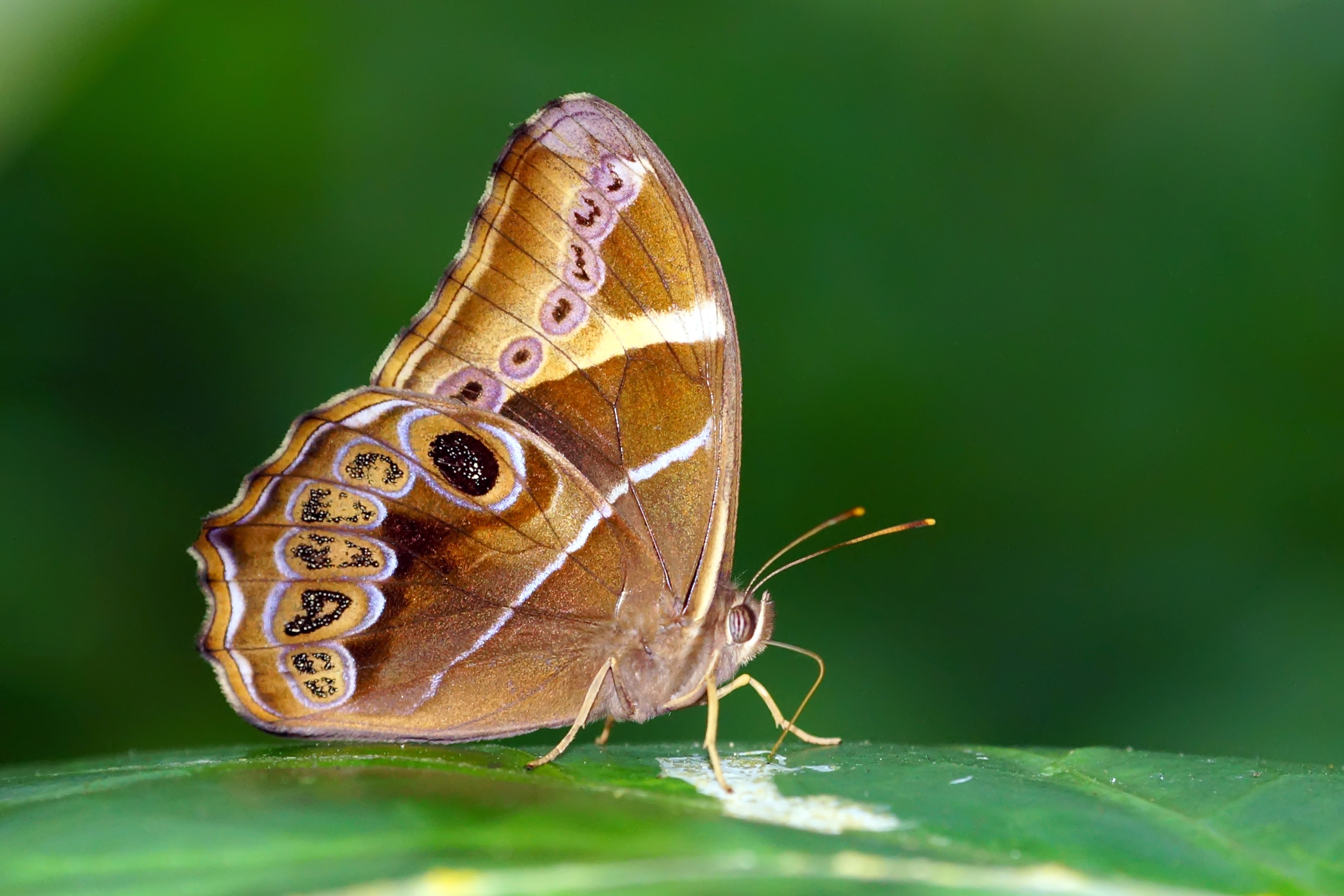
Ventral view (male)

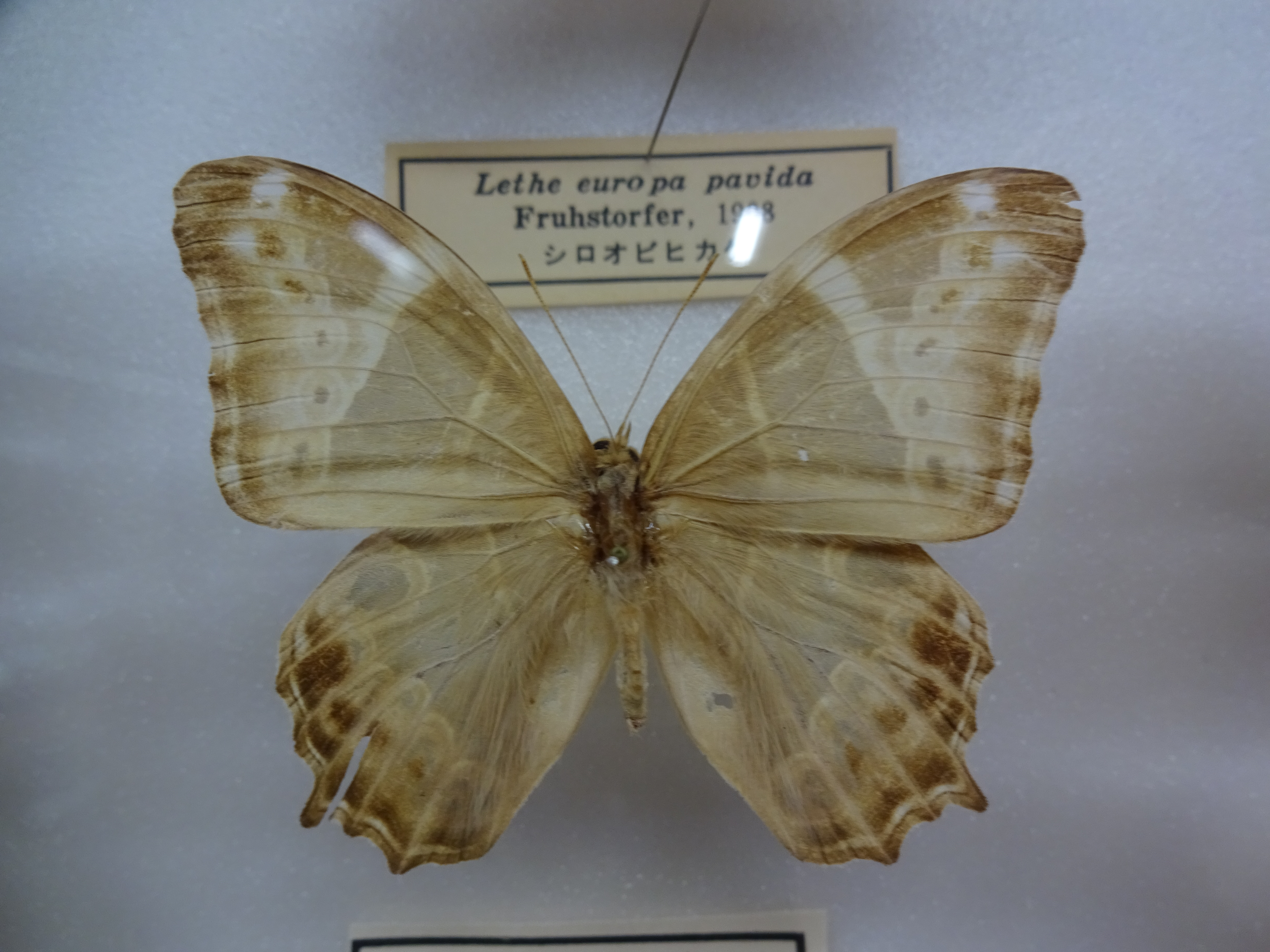
Dorsal view (male)

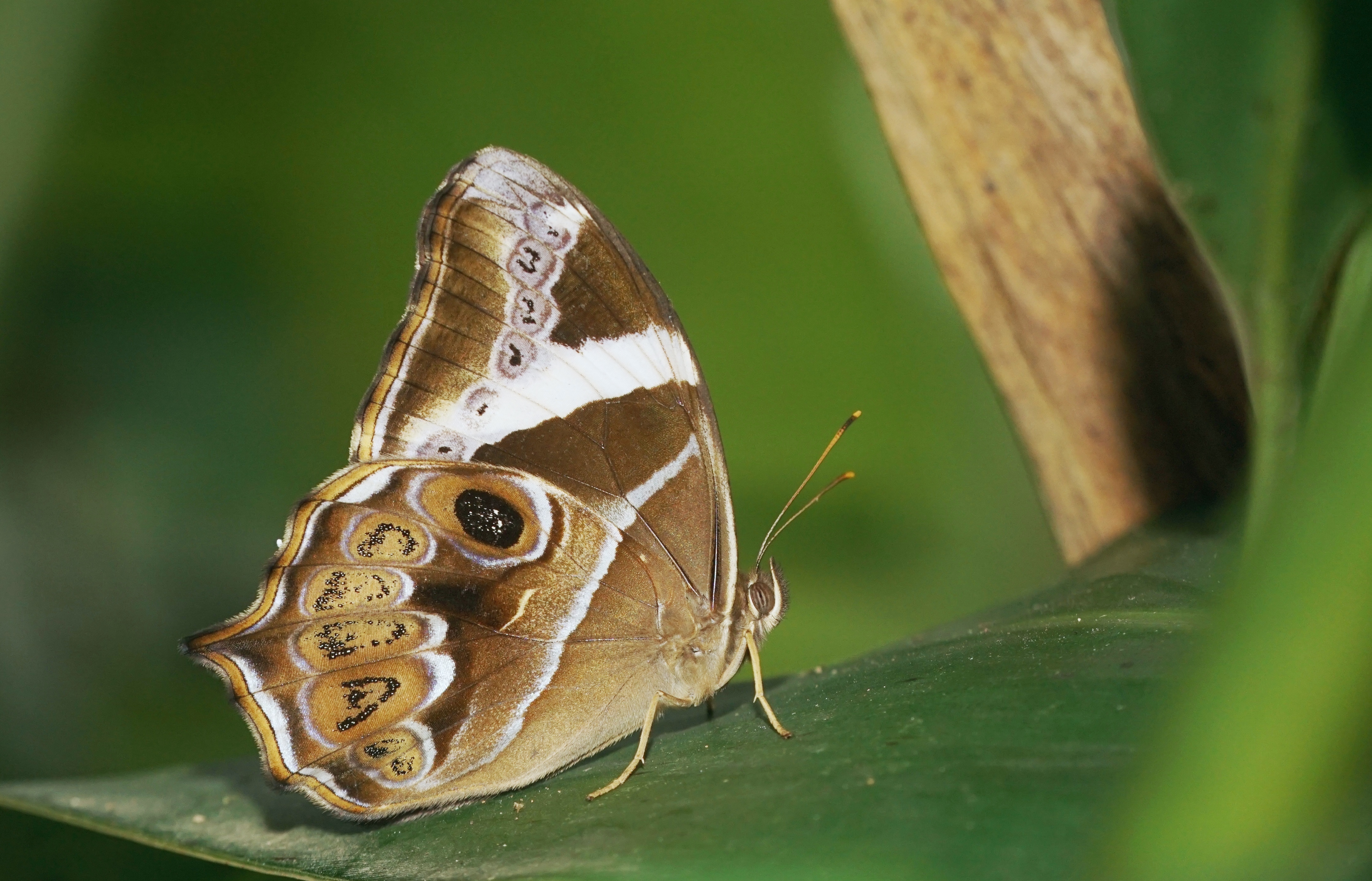
Ventral view (female)

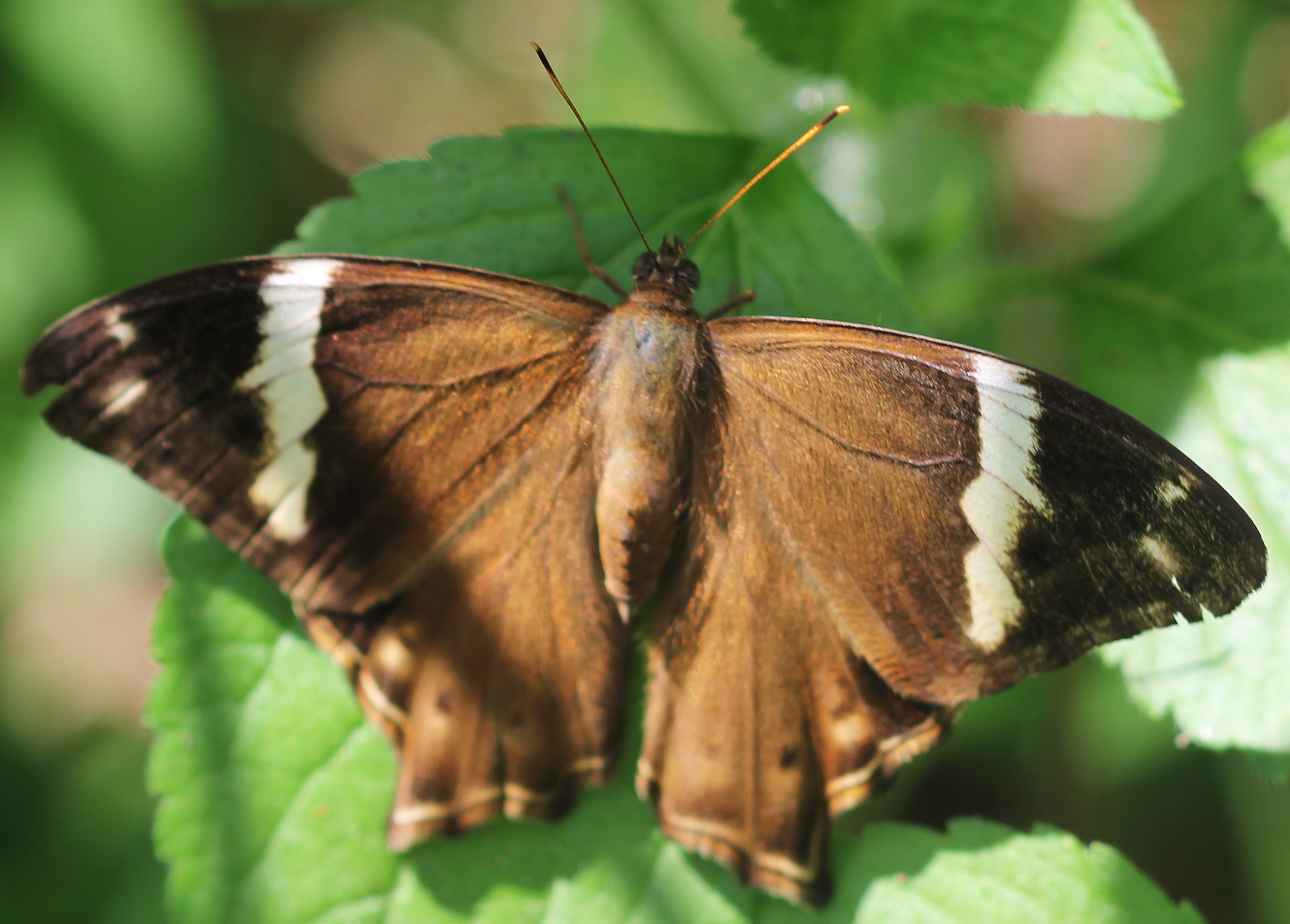
Dorsal view (female)

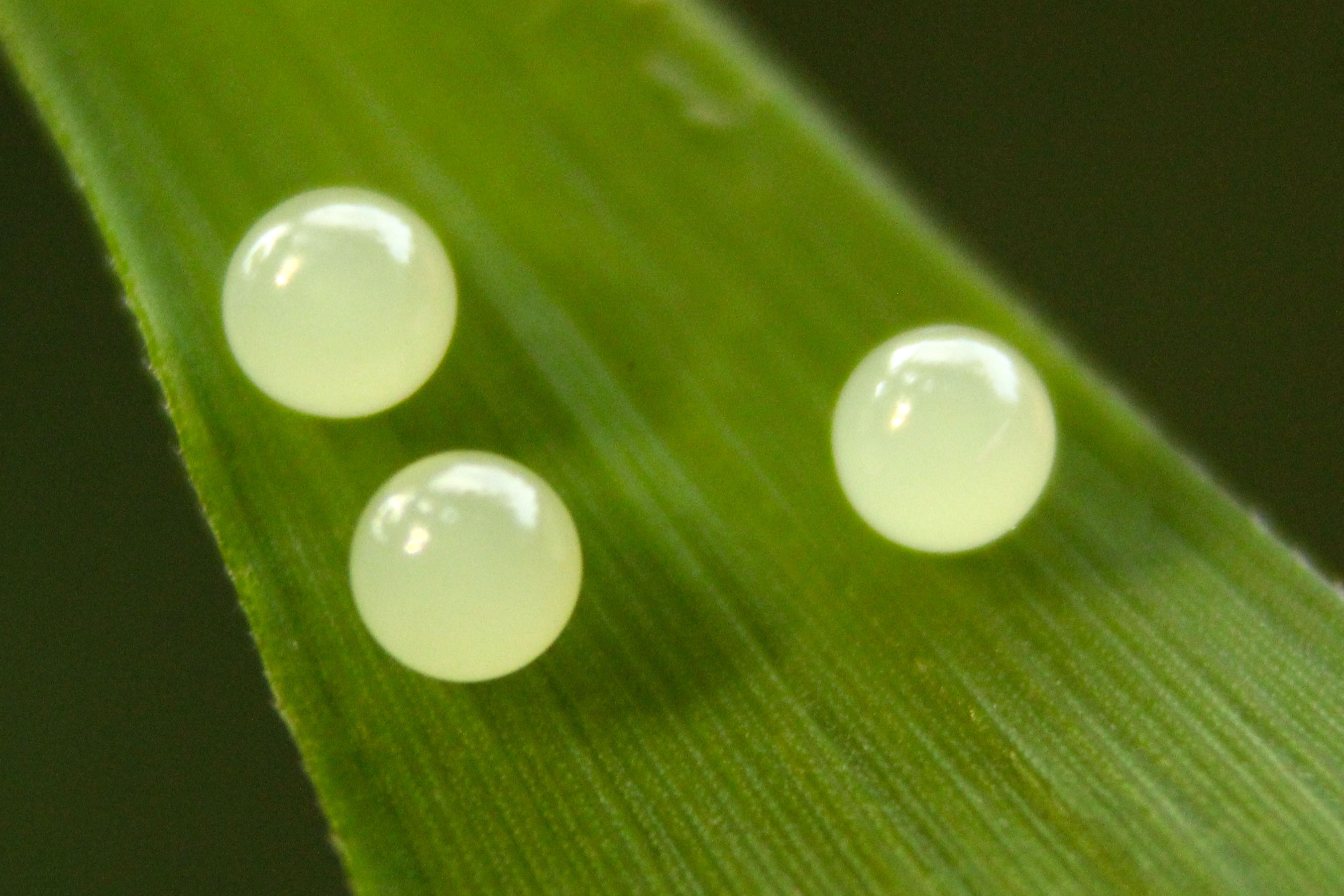
Eggs

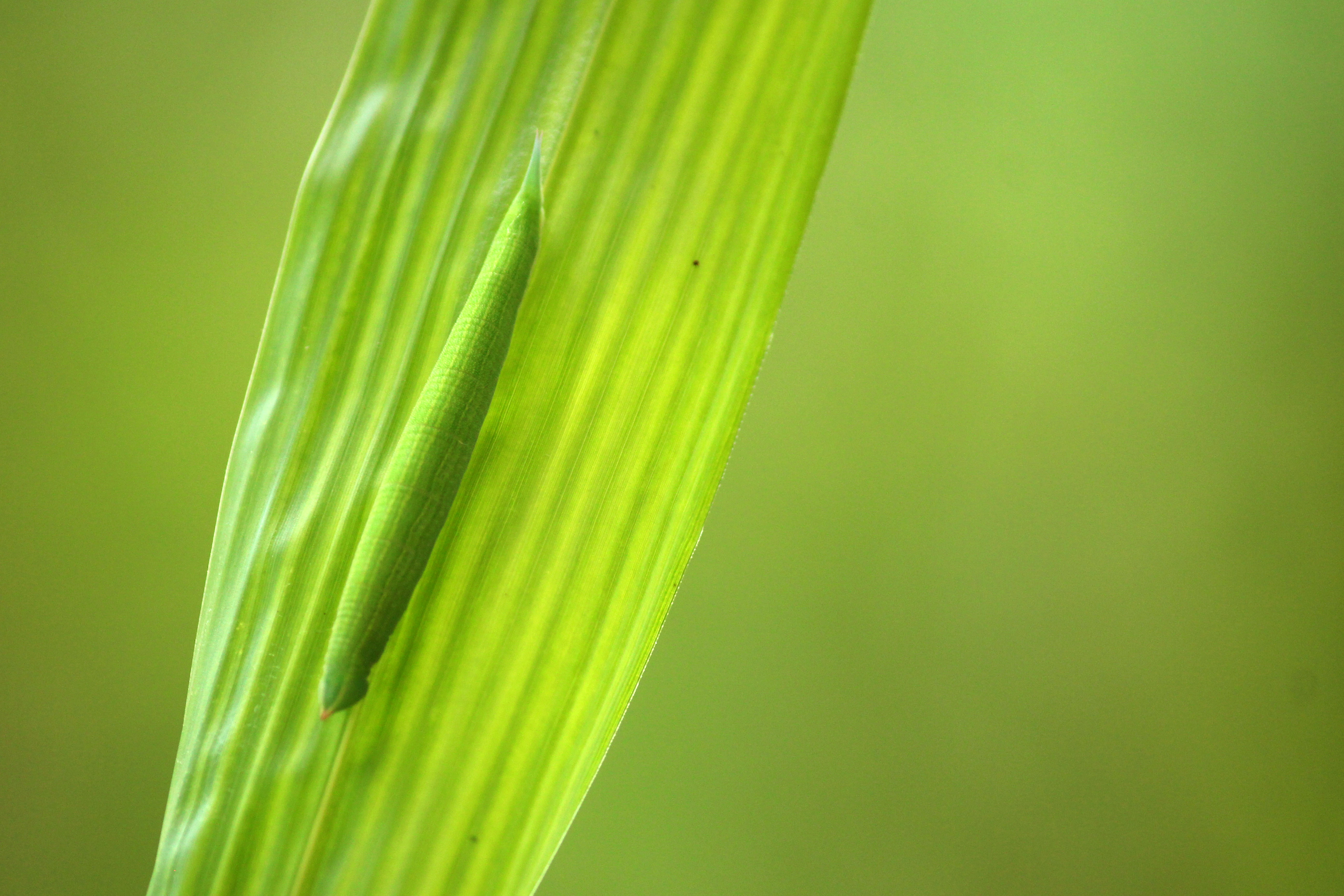
Larva

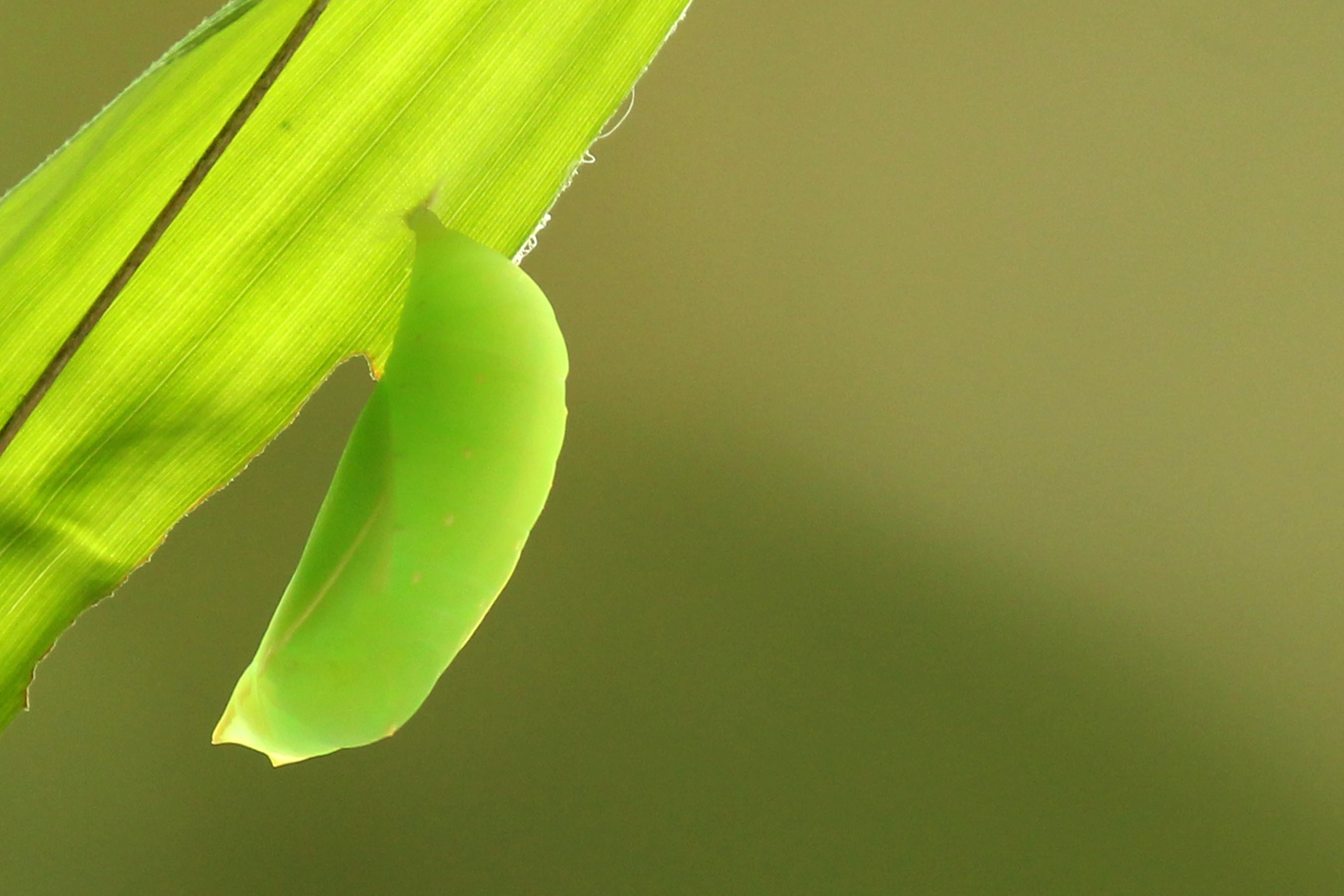
Pupa

===== Lethe rohria (common treebrown) =====
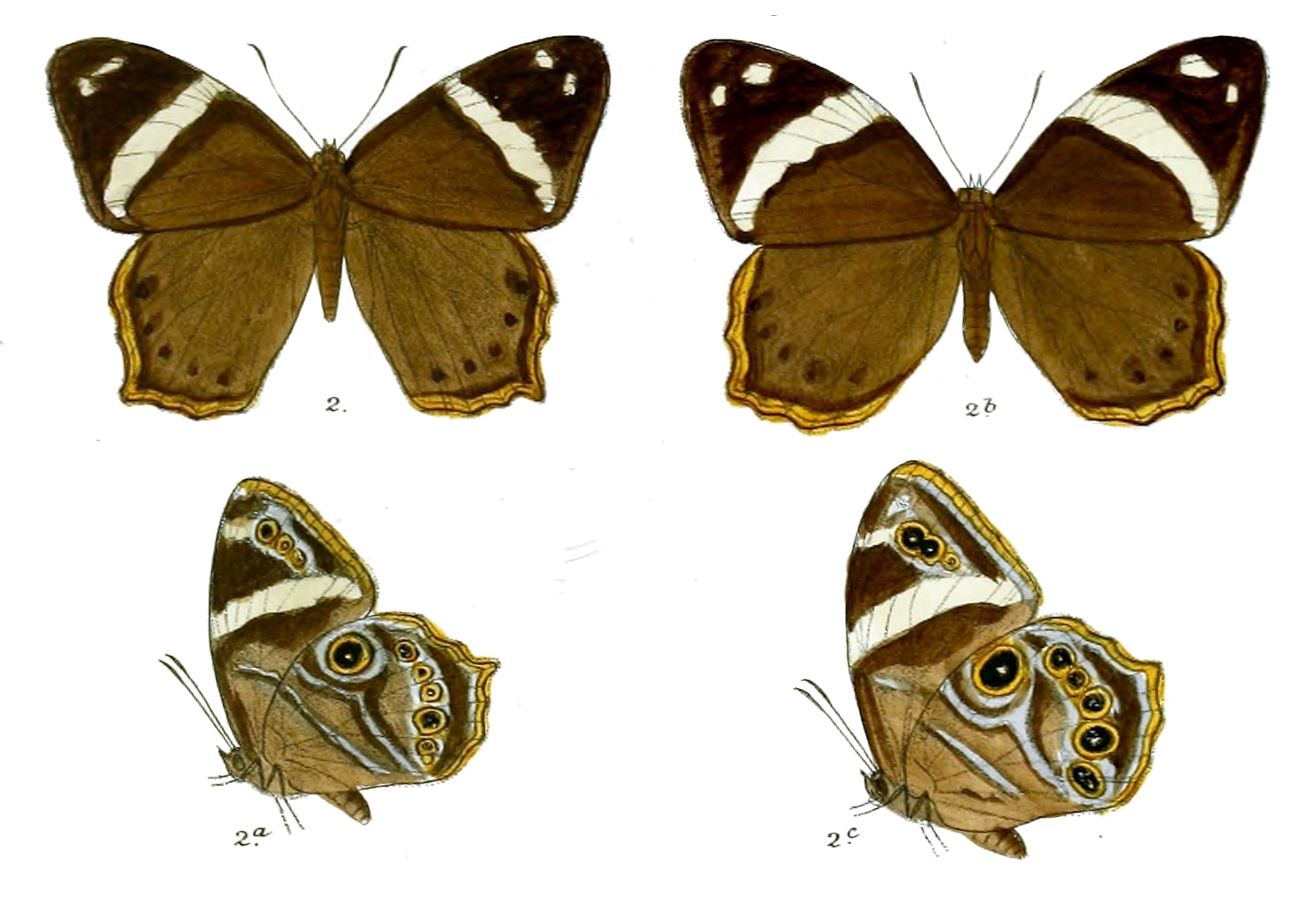
Illustration

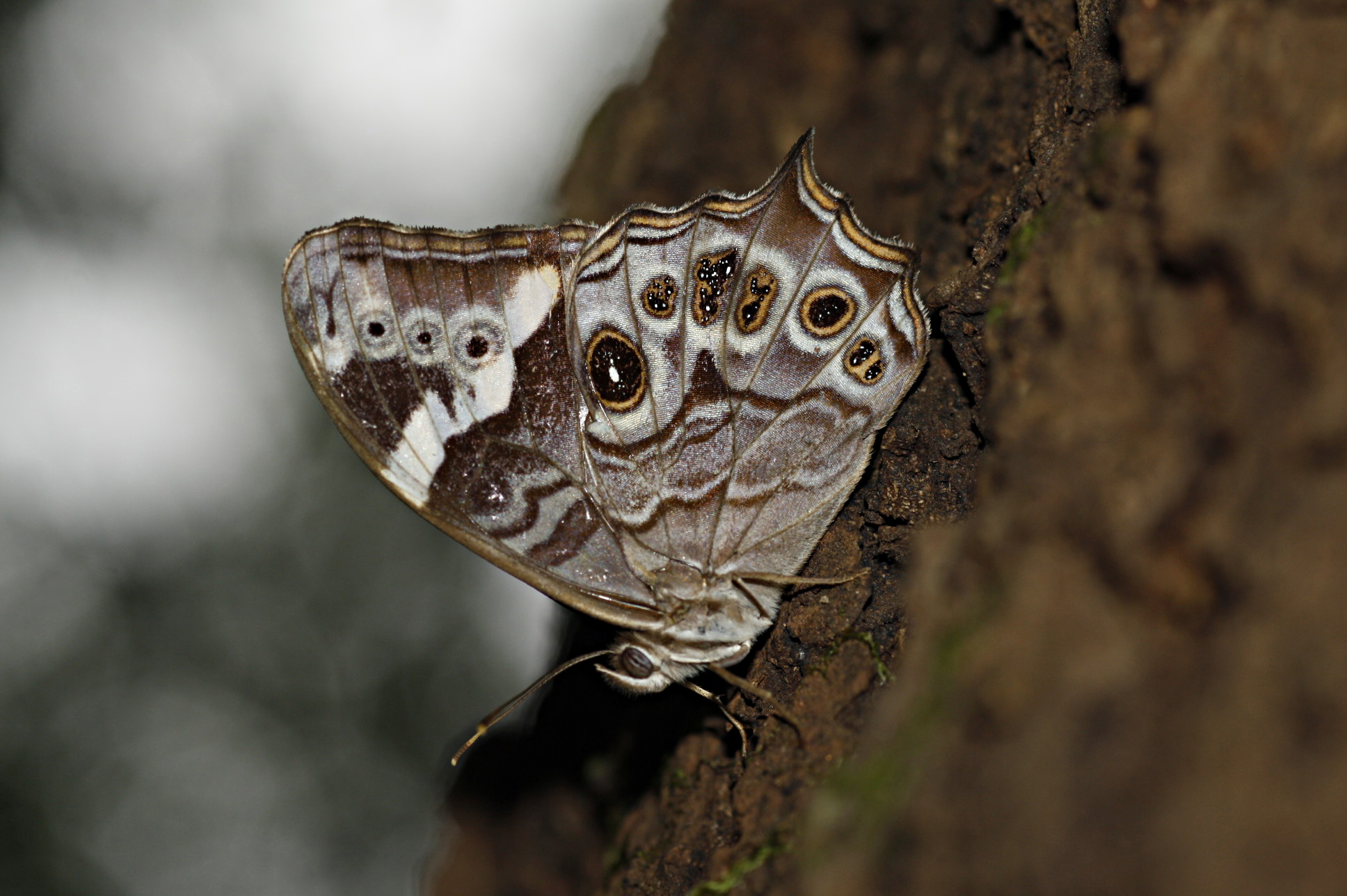
Ventral view

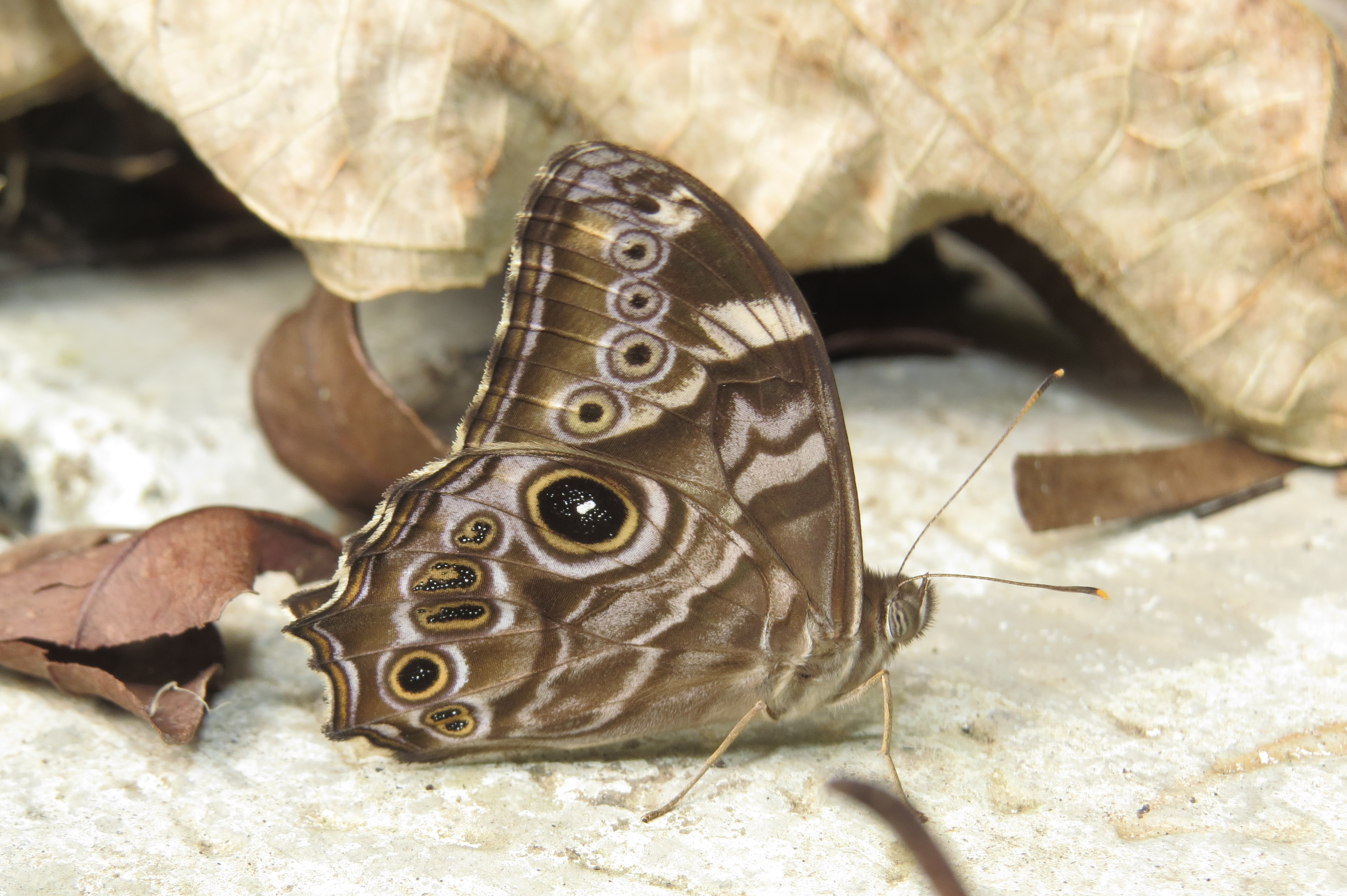
Ventral view

==== Genus: Melanitis (evening browns) ====
===== Melanitis leda (common evening brown) =====
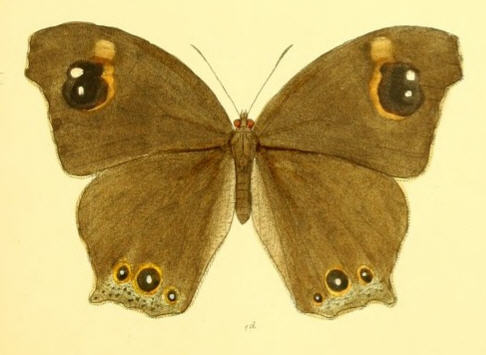
Dorsal view

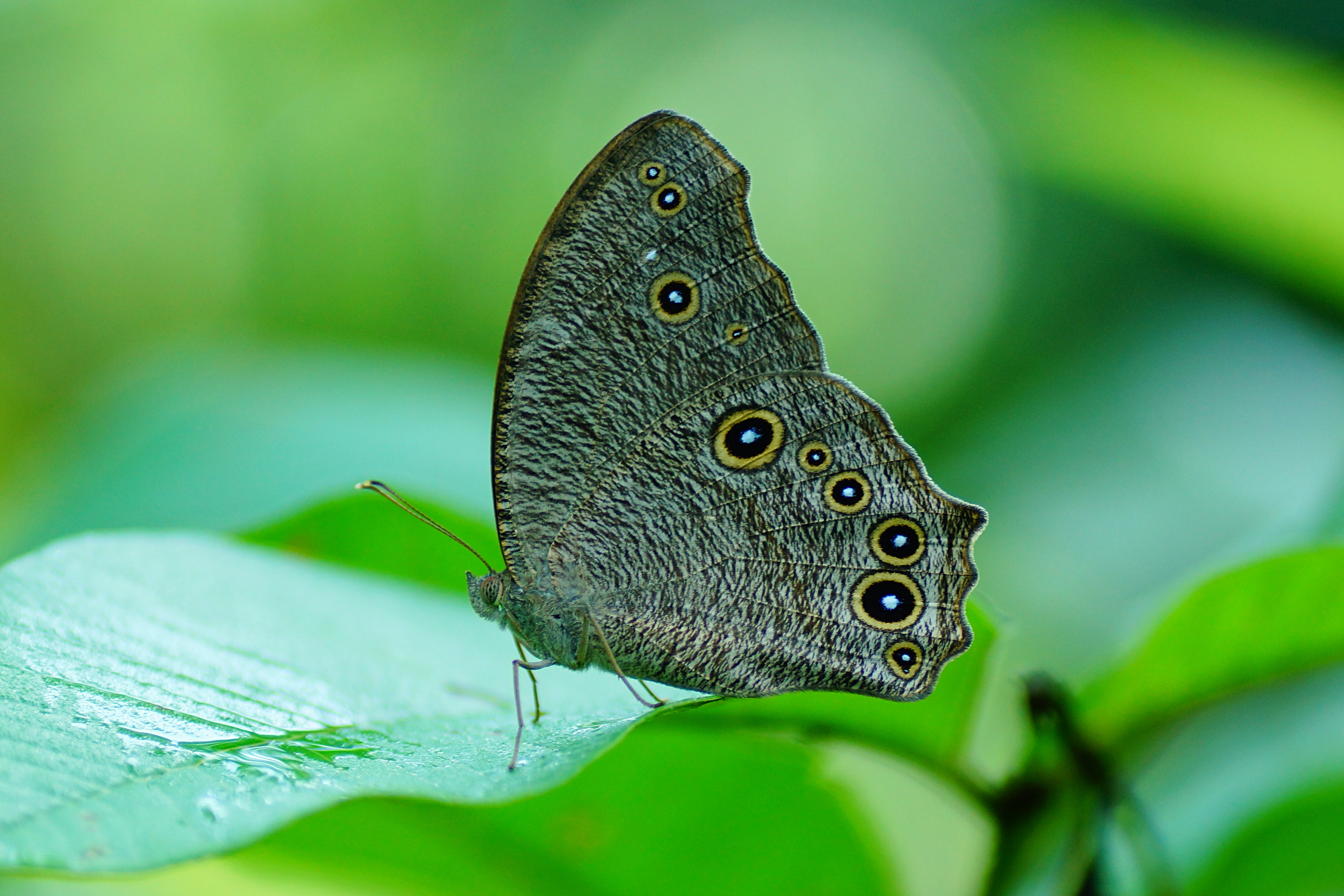
Ventral view (wet-season form)

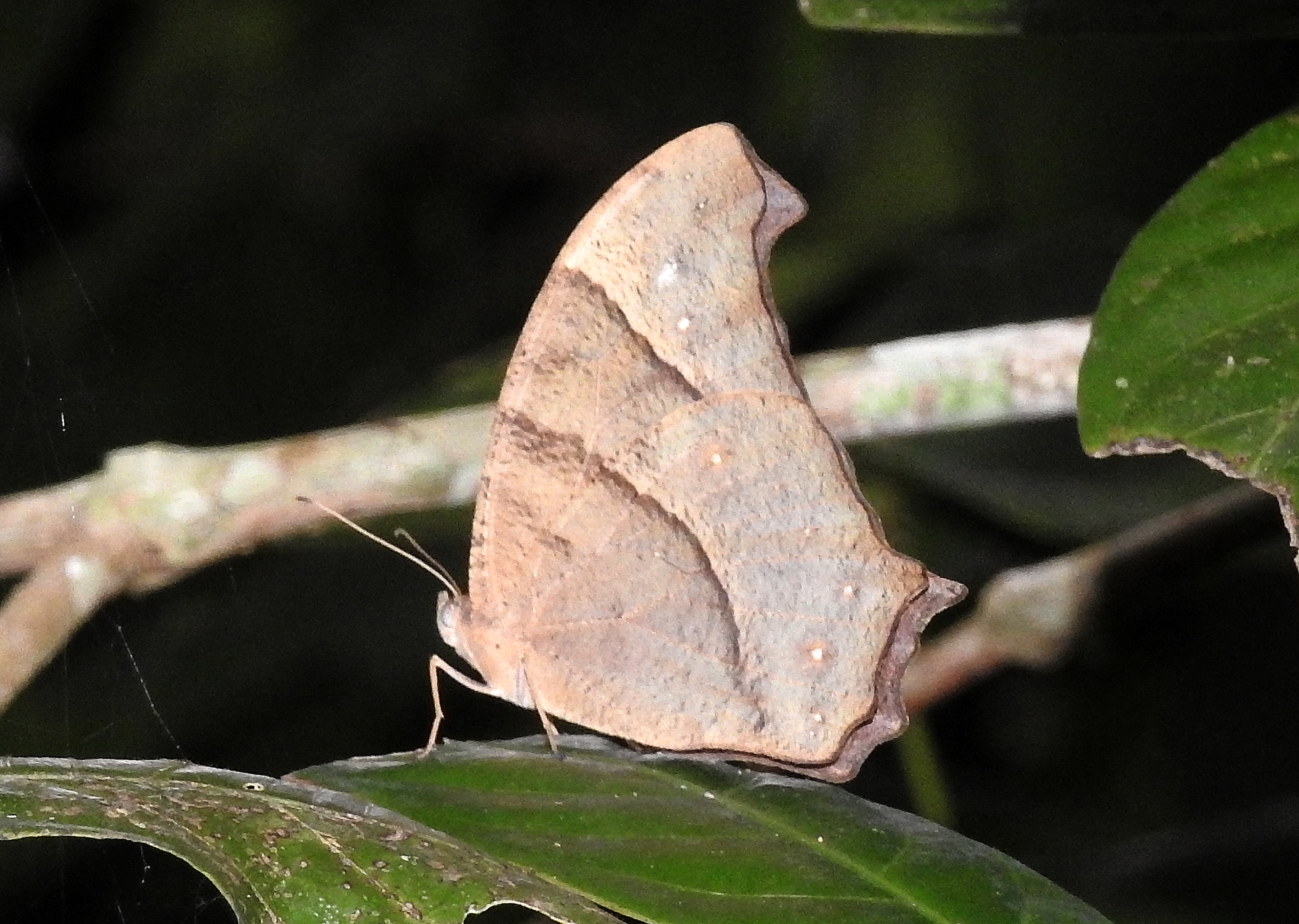
Ventral view (dry-season form)

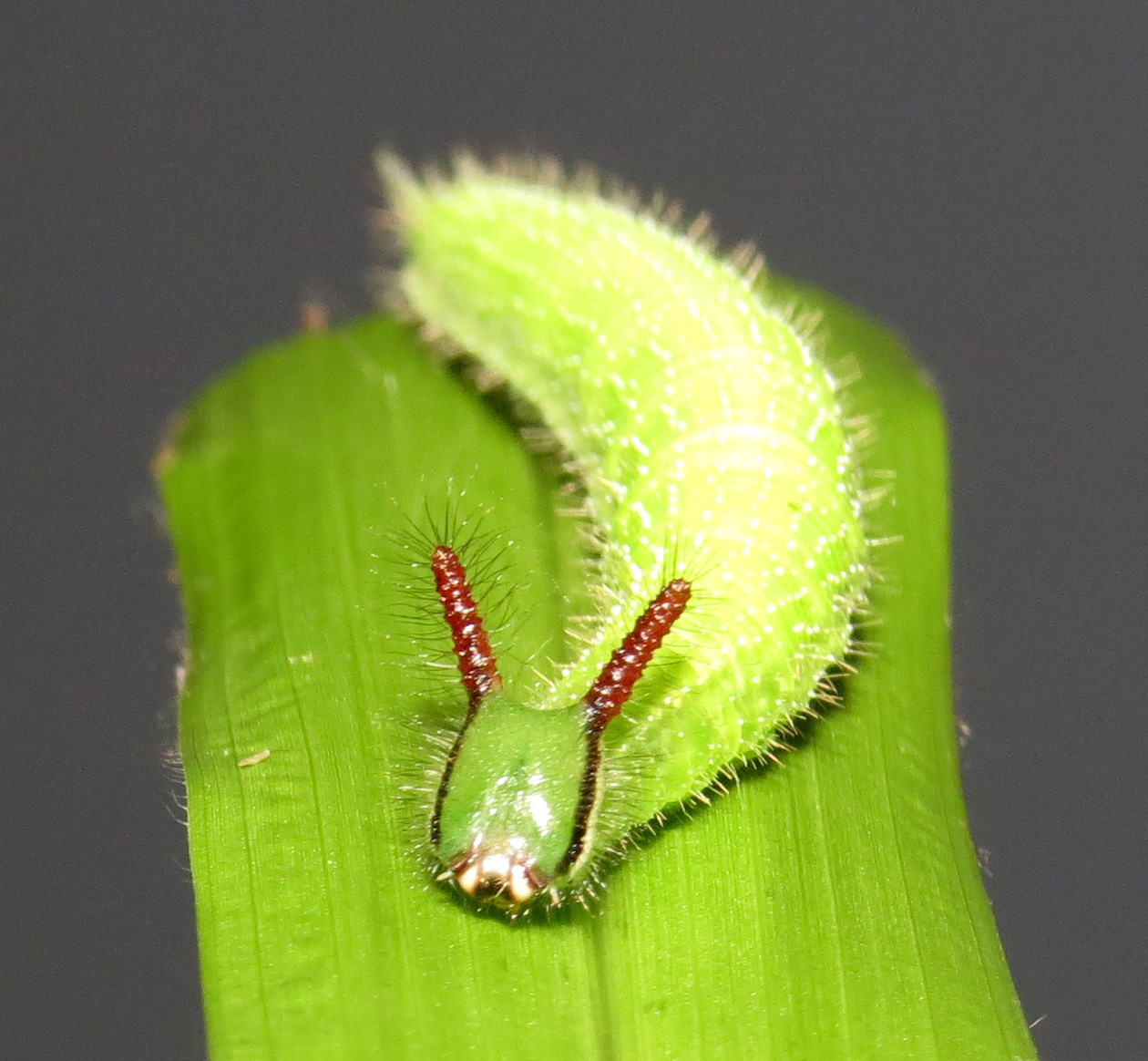
Larva

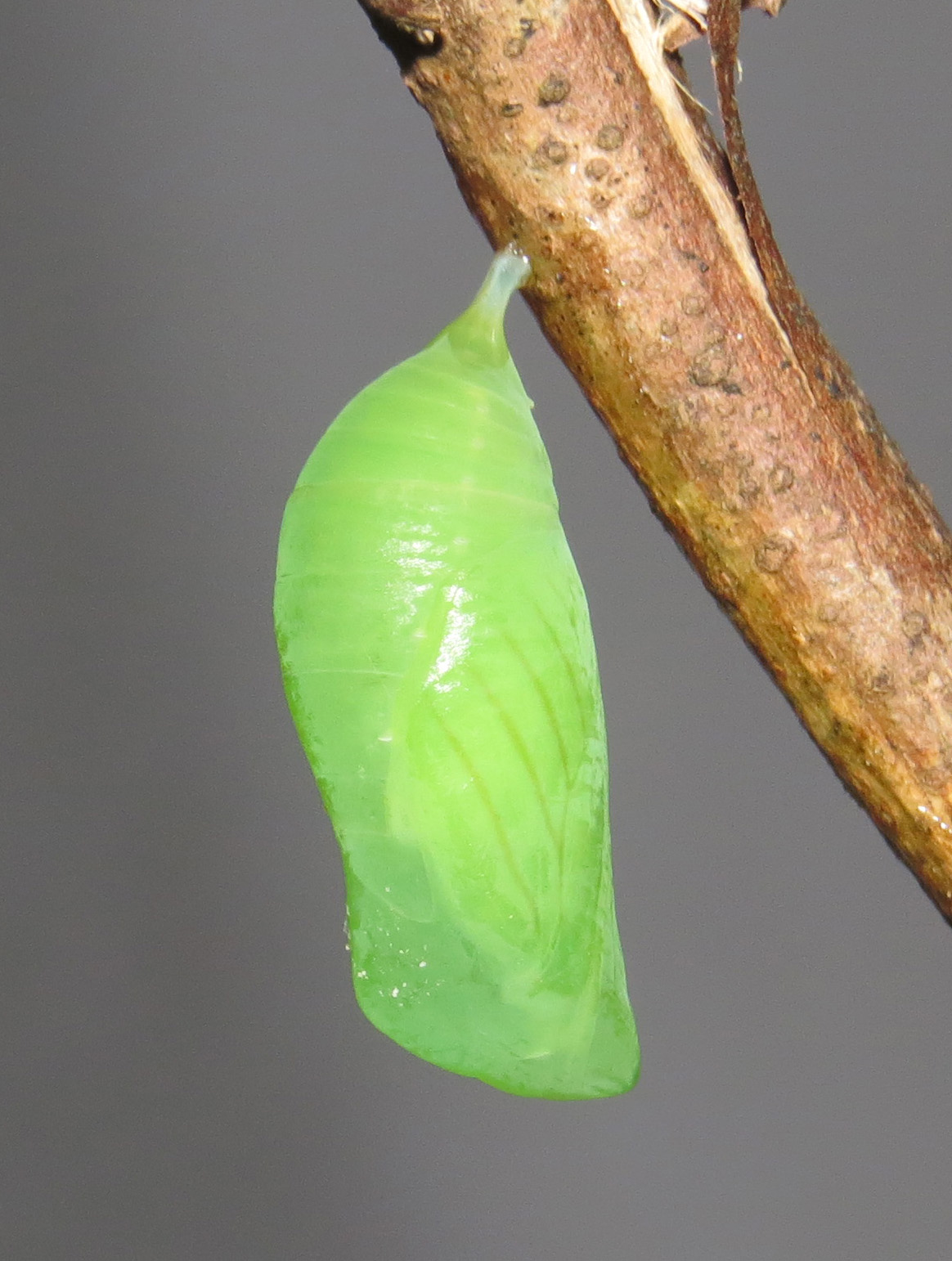
Pupa

===== Melanitis phedima (dark evening brown) =====
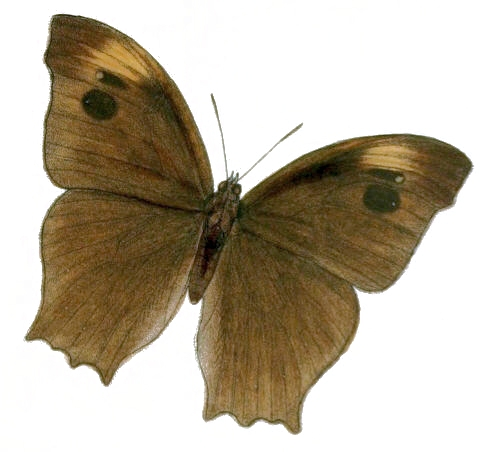
Dorsal view (wet-season form)

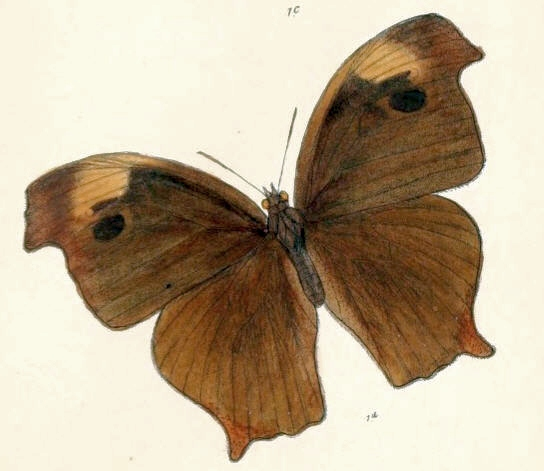
Dorsal view (dry-season form)

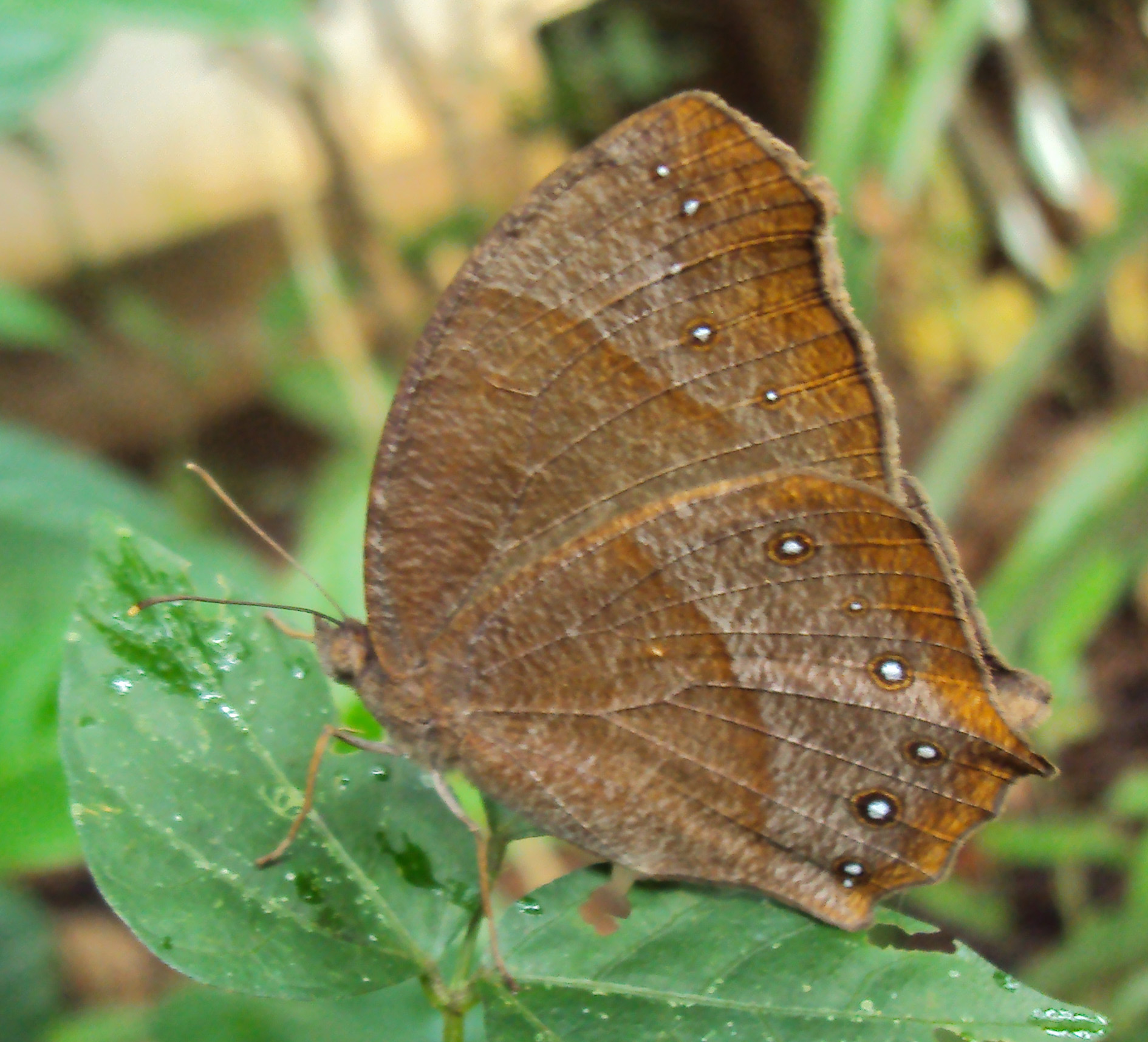
Ventral view (wet-season form)

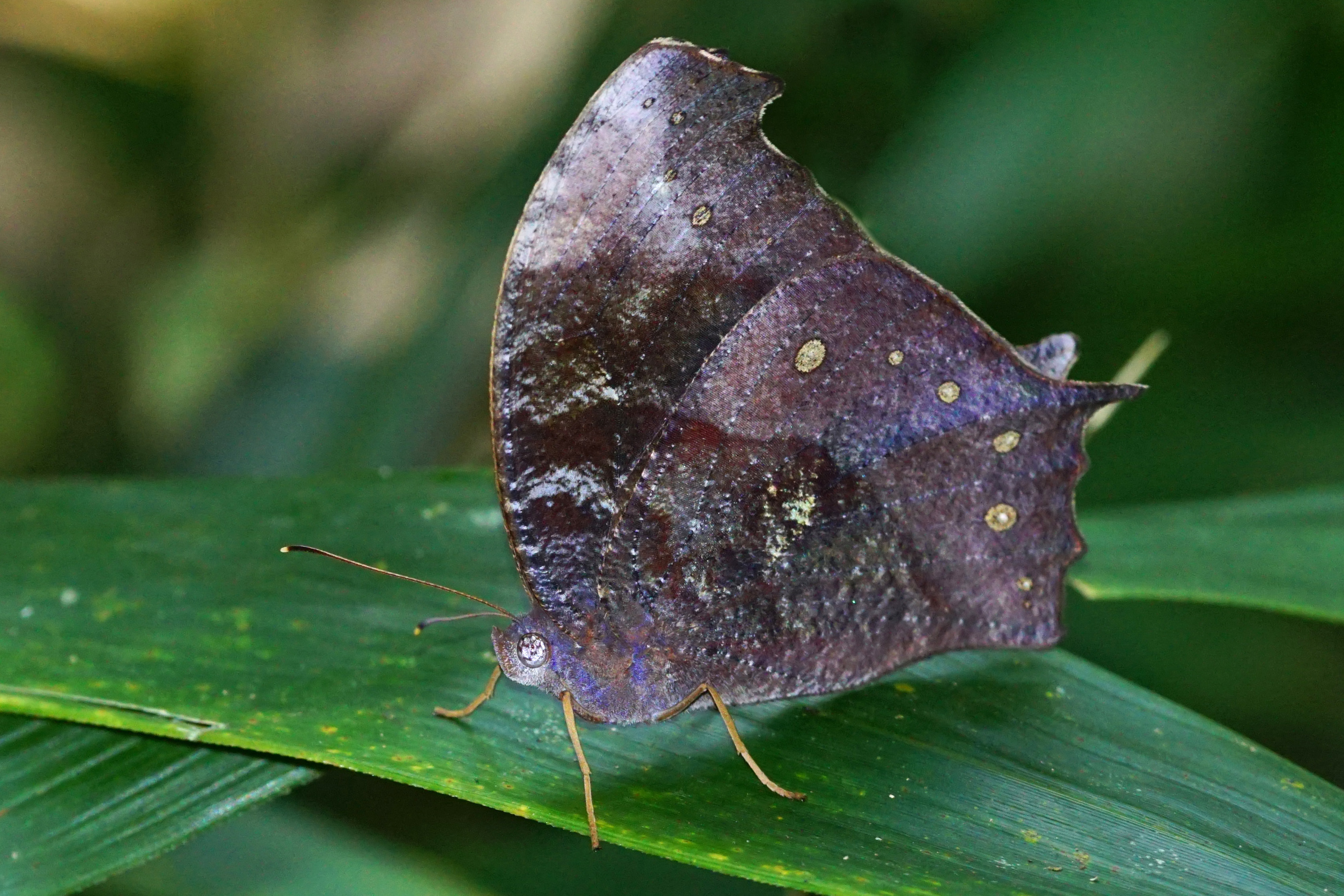
Ventral view (dry-season form)

===== Melanitis zitenius (great evening brown) =====
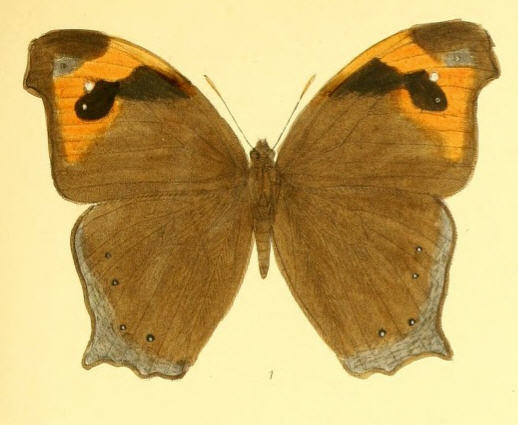
Dorsal view

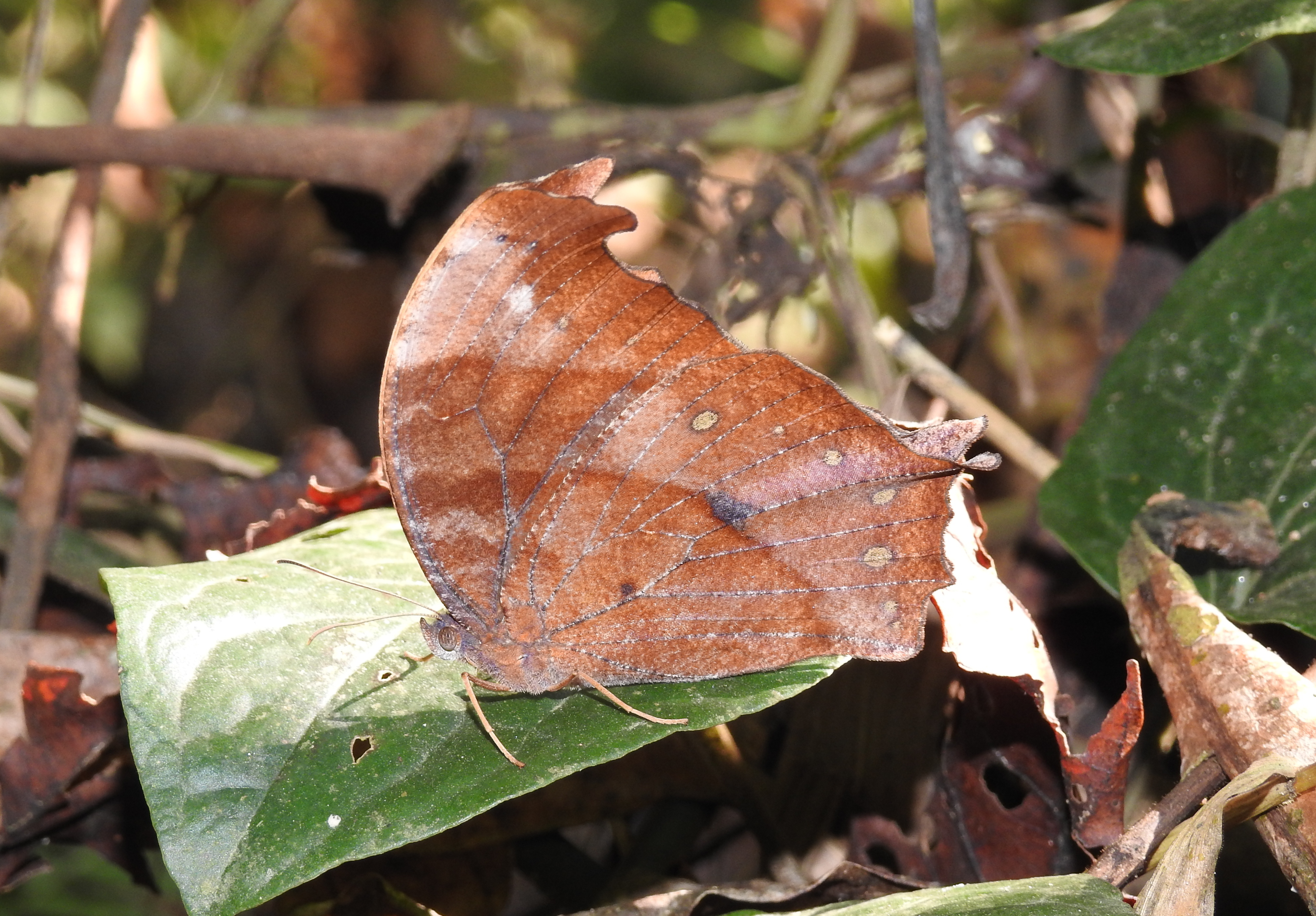
Ventral view

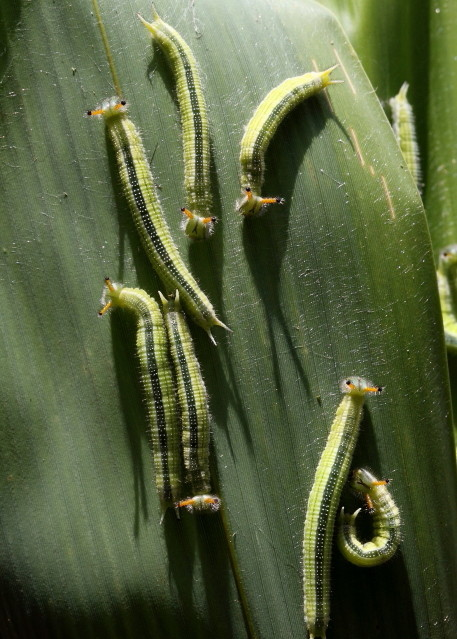
Larva

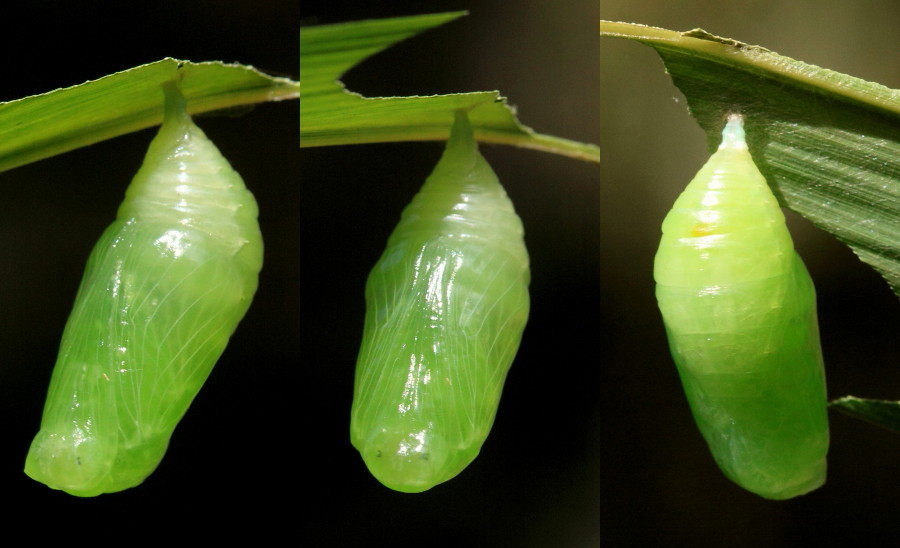
Pupa

==== Genus: Mycalesis (bushbrowns) ====
===== Mycalesis anaxias (whitebar bushbrown) =====
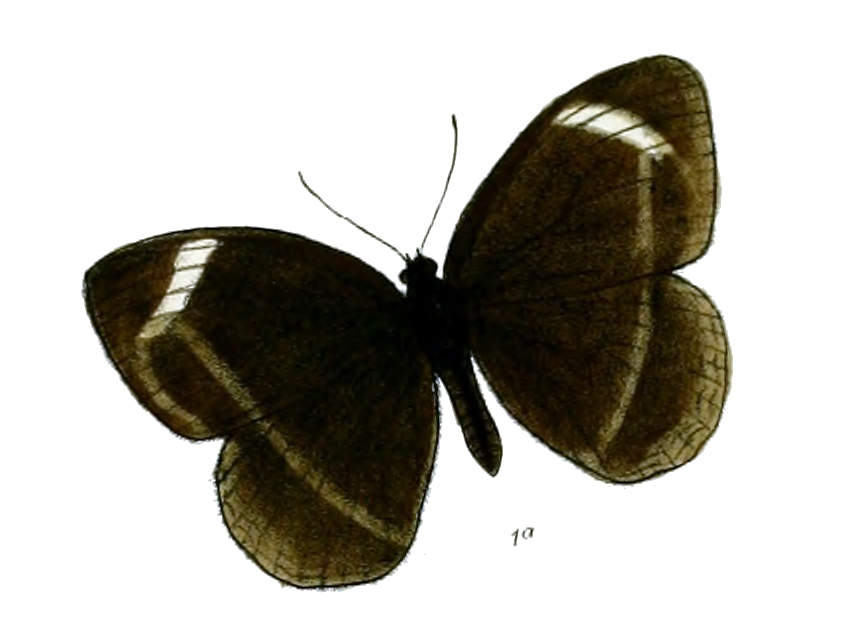
Dorsal view

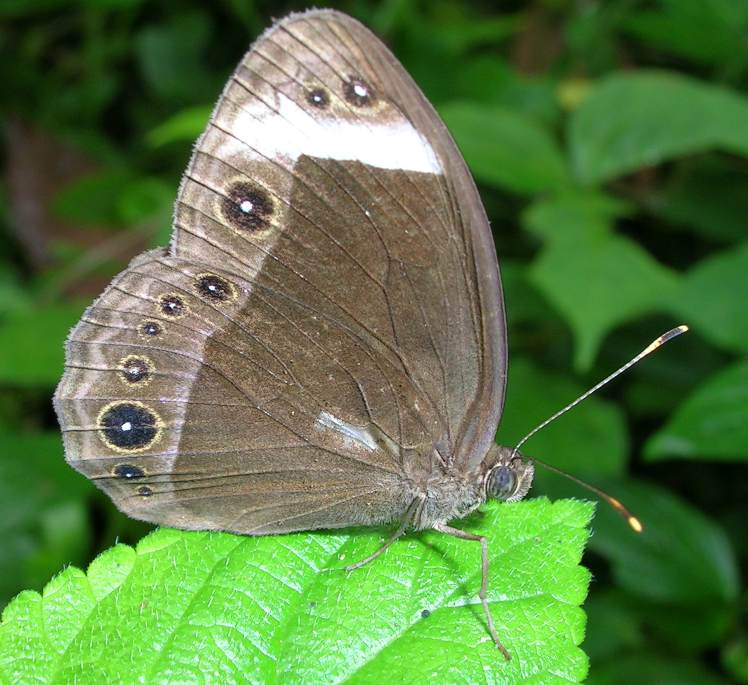
Ventral view (wet-season form)

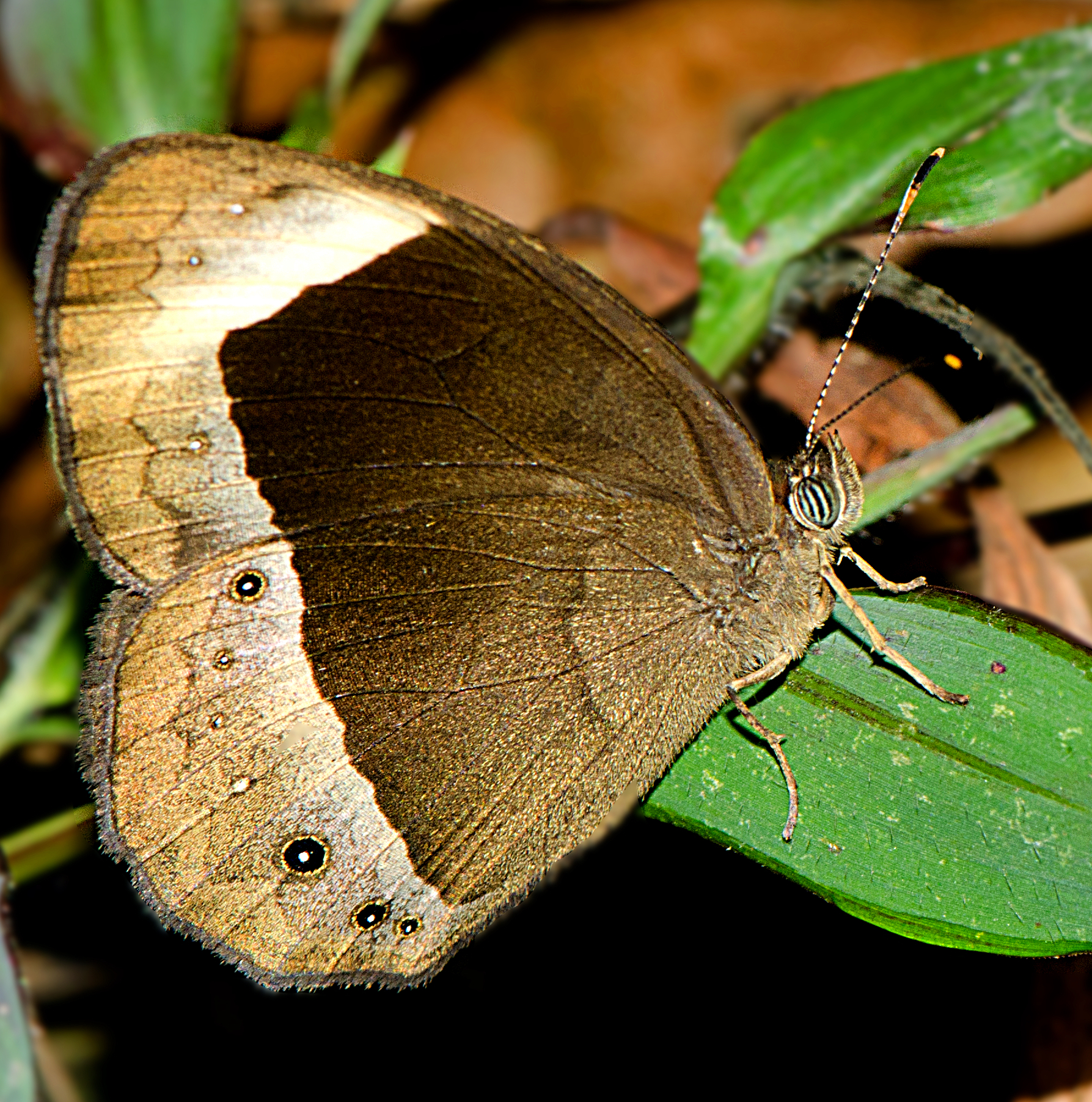
Ventral view (dry-season form)

===== Mycalesis mineus (dark branded bushbrown) =====
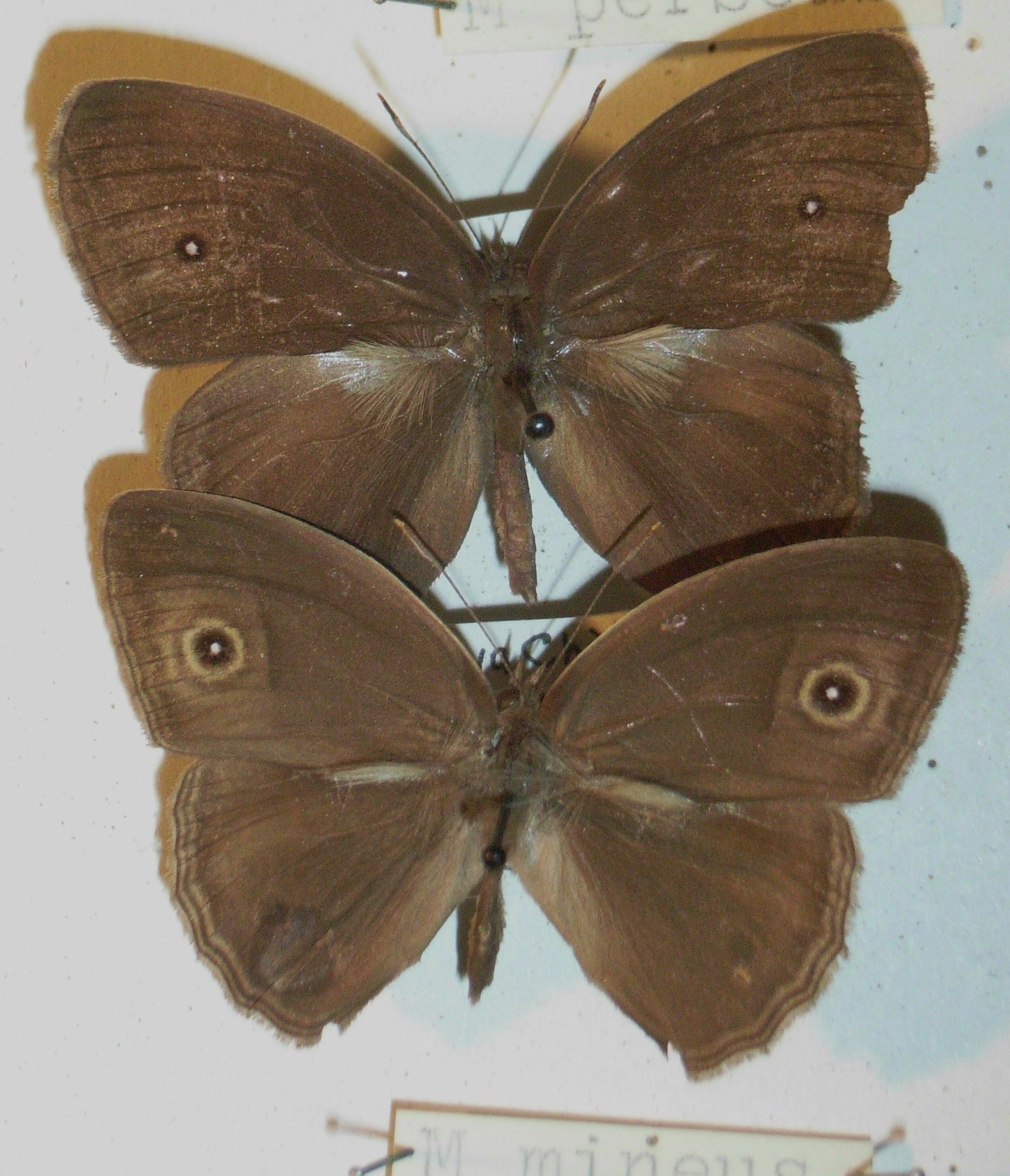
Dorsal view

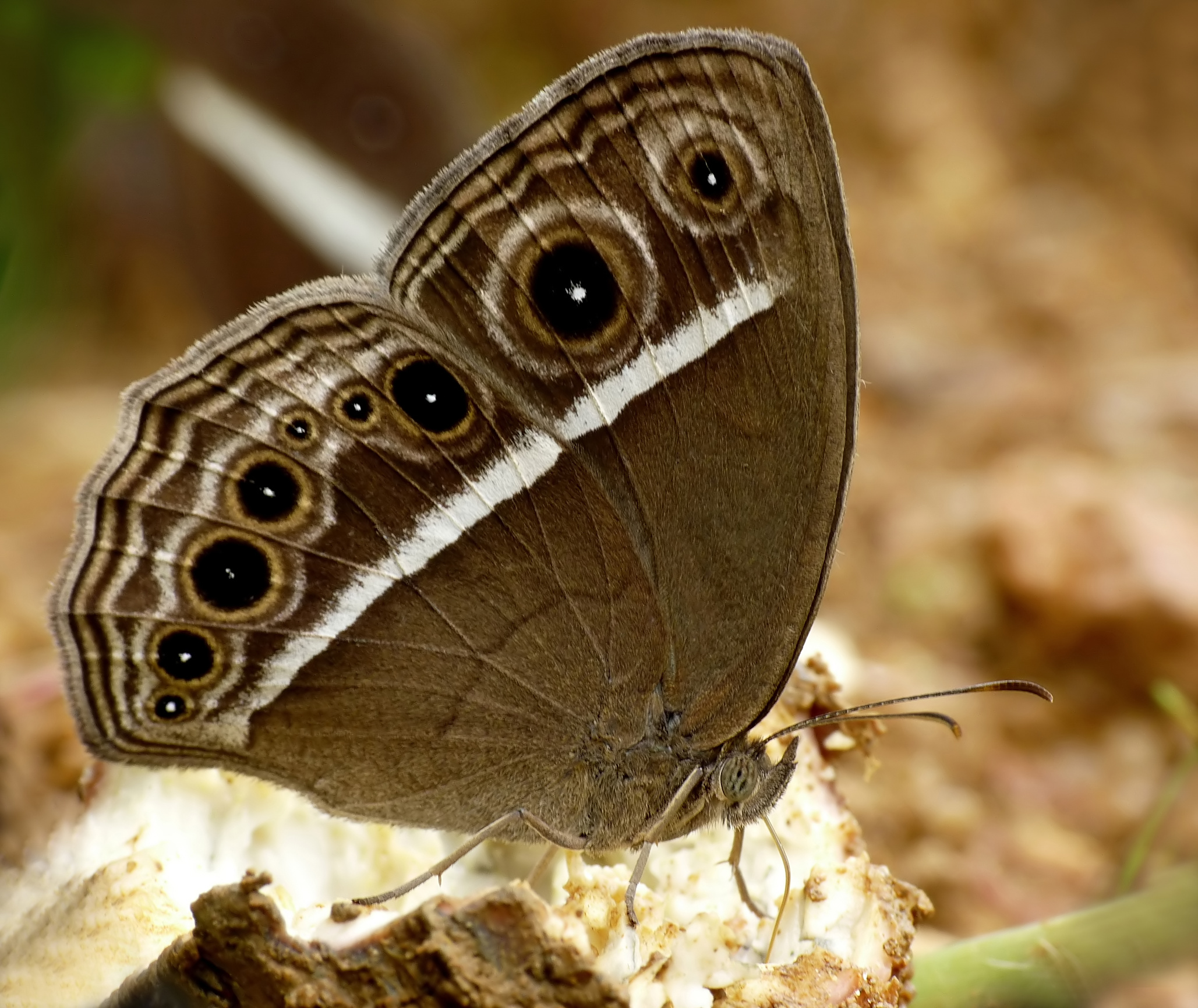
Ventral view

===== Mycalesis/Telinga oculus (red-disc bushbrown) =====
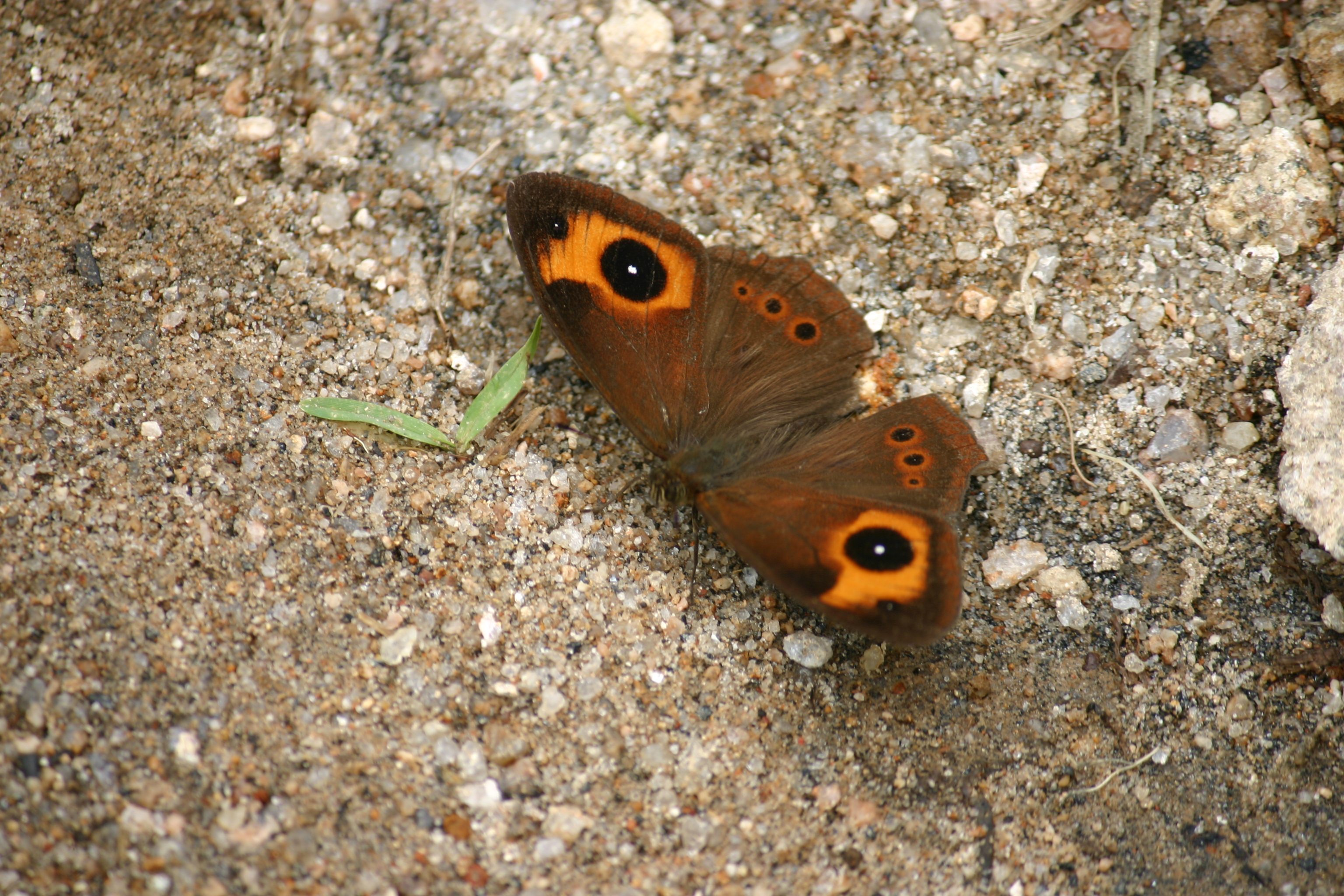
Dorsal view

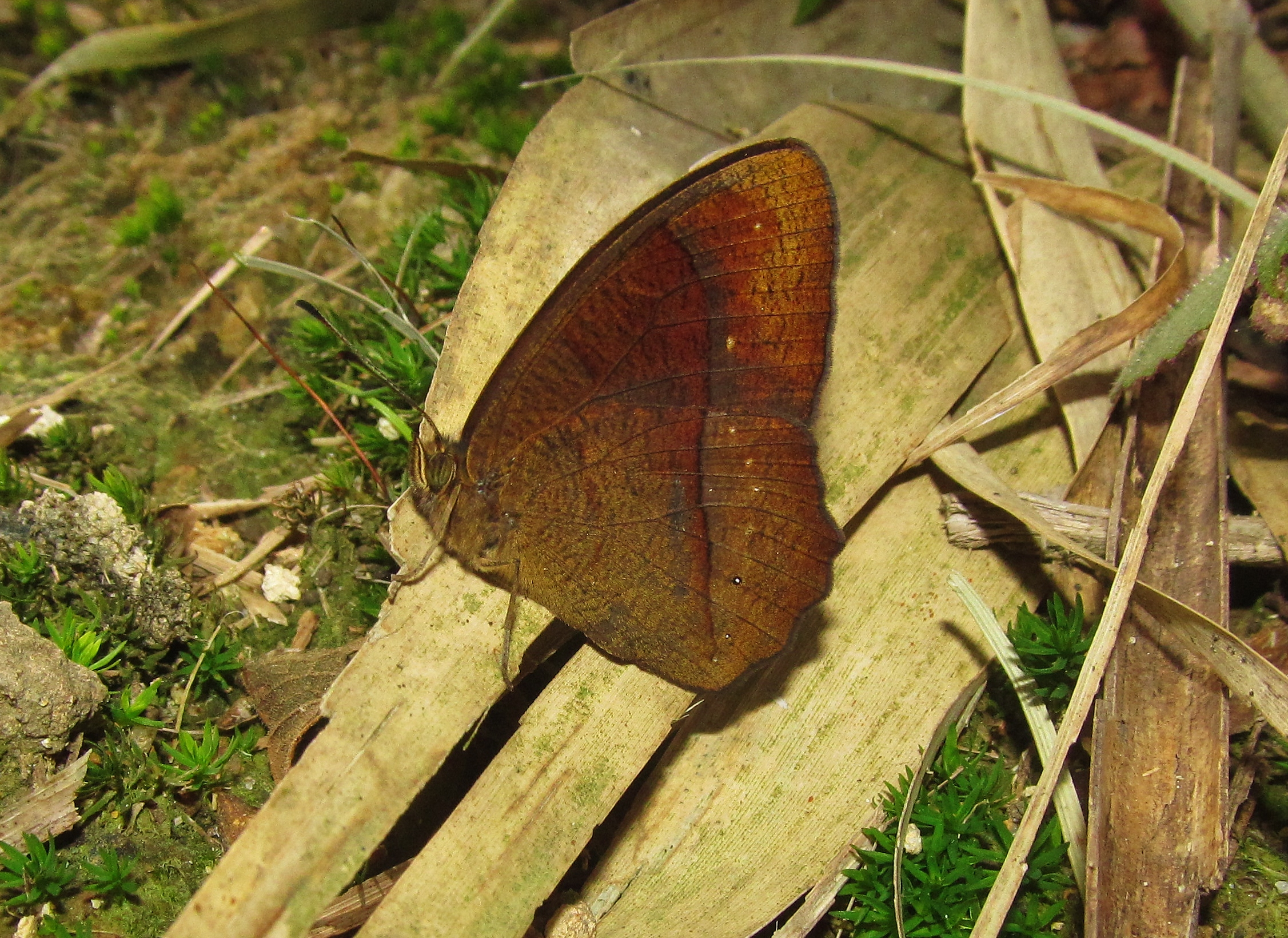
Ventral view

===== Mycalesis patnia junonia (glad-eye bushbrown) =====
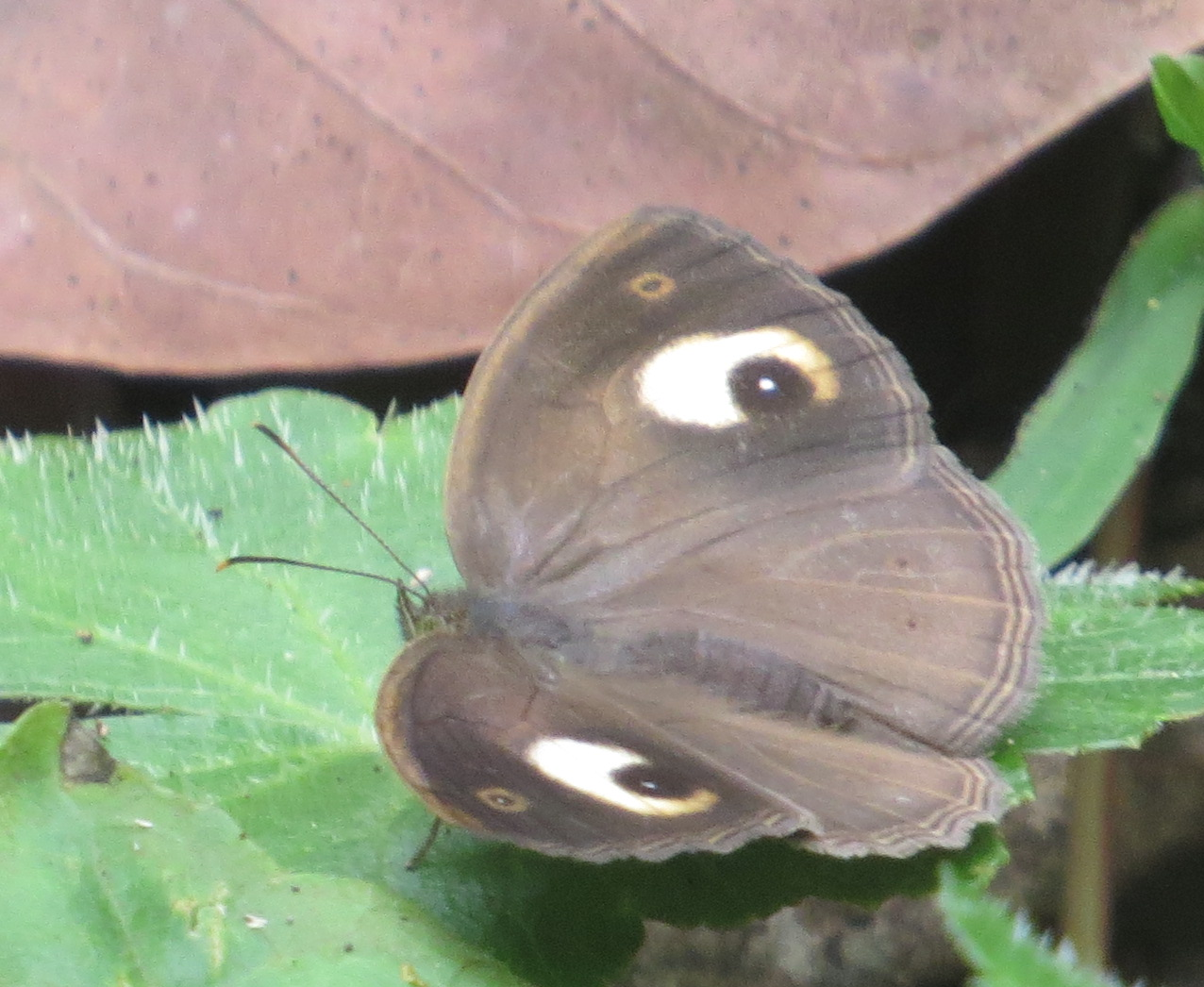
Dorsal view

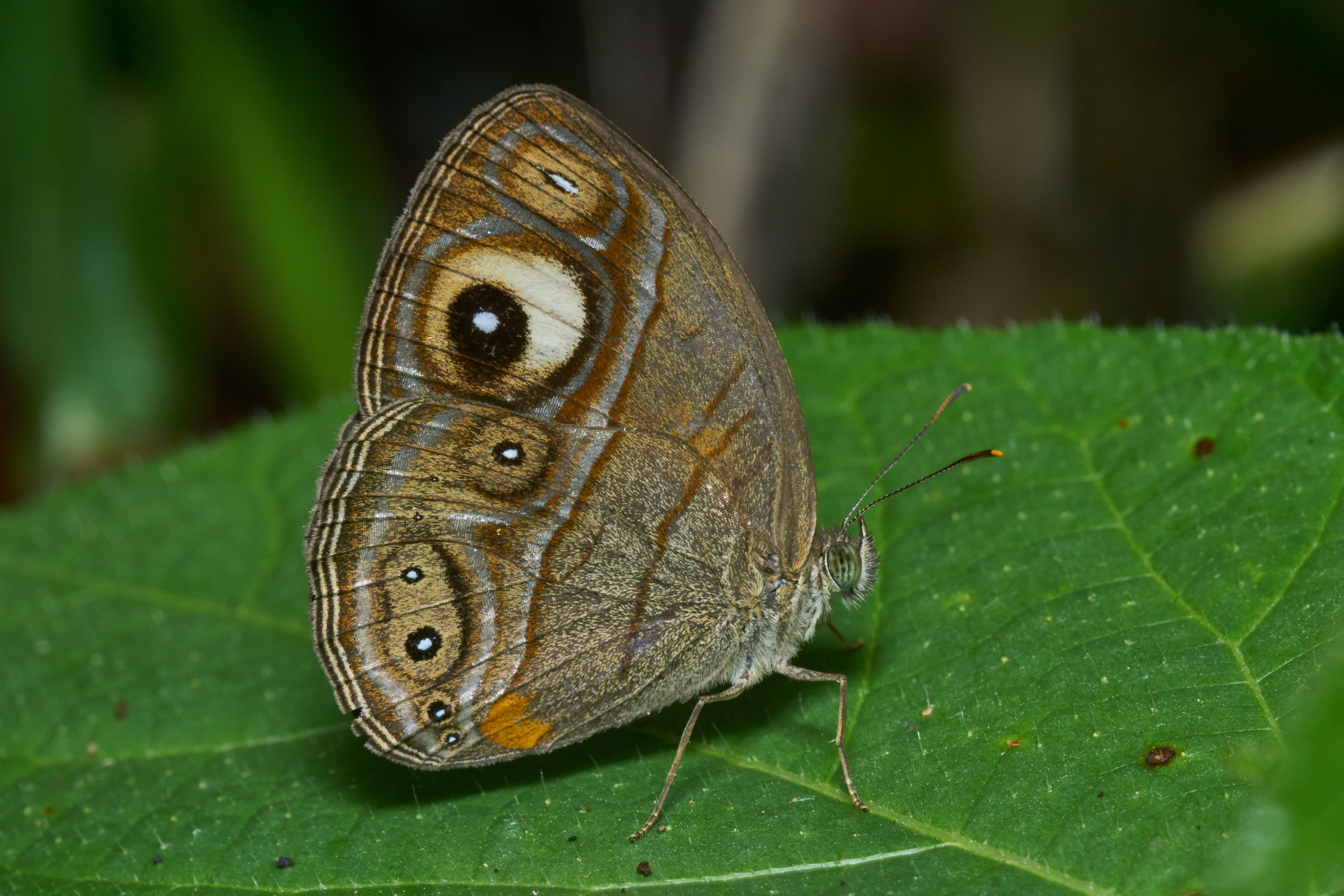
Ventral view

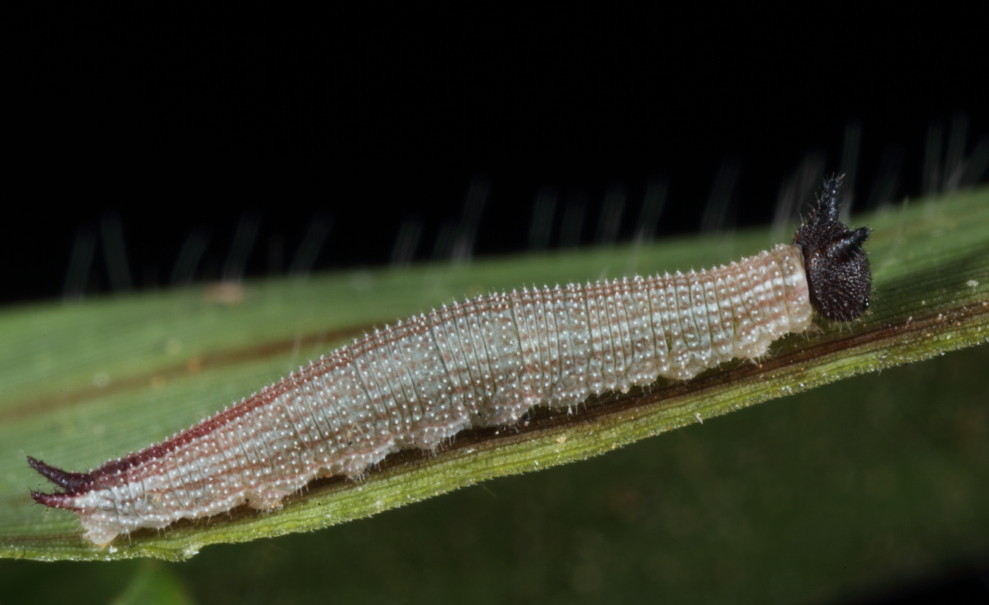
Larva

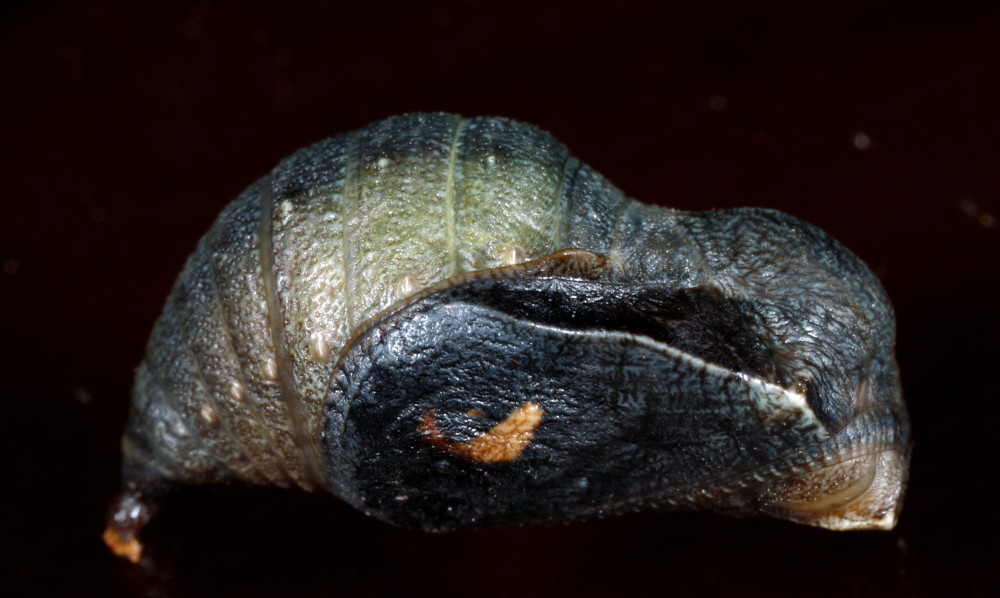
Chrysalis

===== Mycalesis perseus (common bushbrown) =====
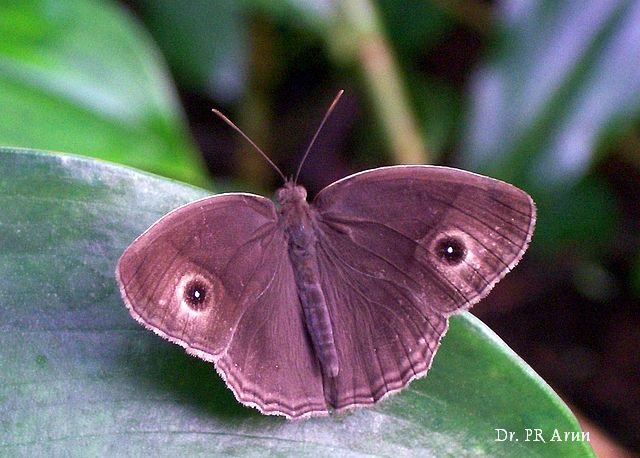
Dorsal view

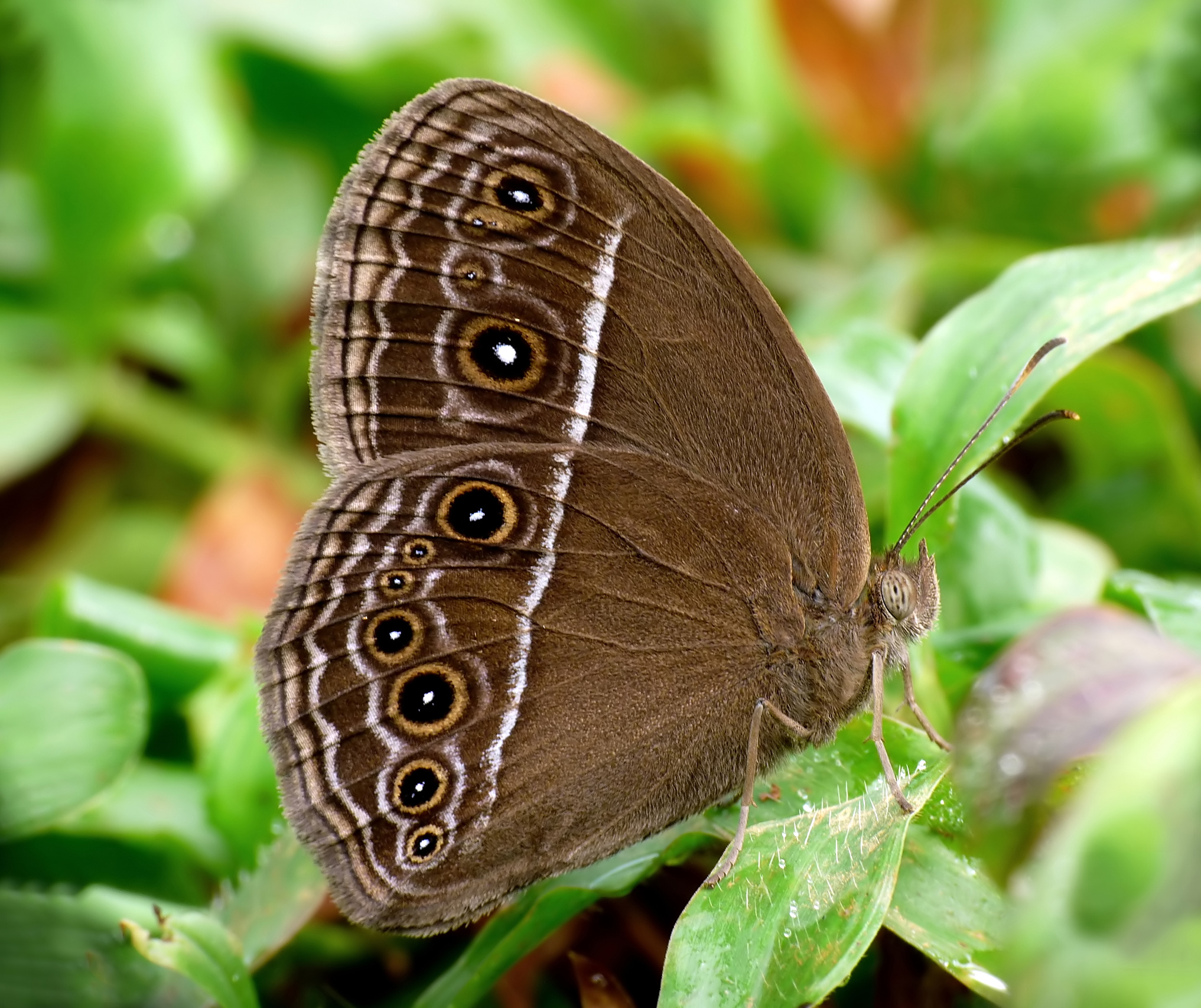
Ventral view

===== Mycalesis subdita (Tamil bushbrown) =====
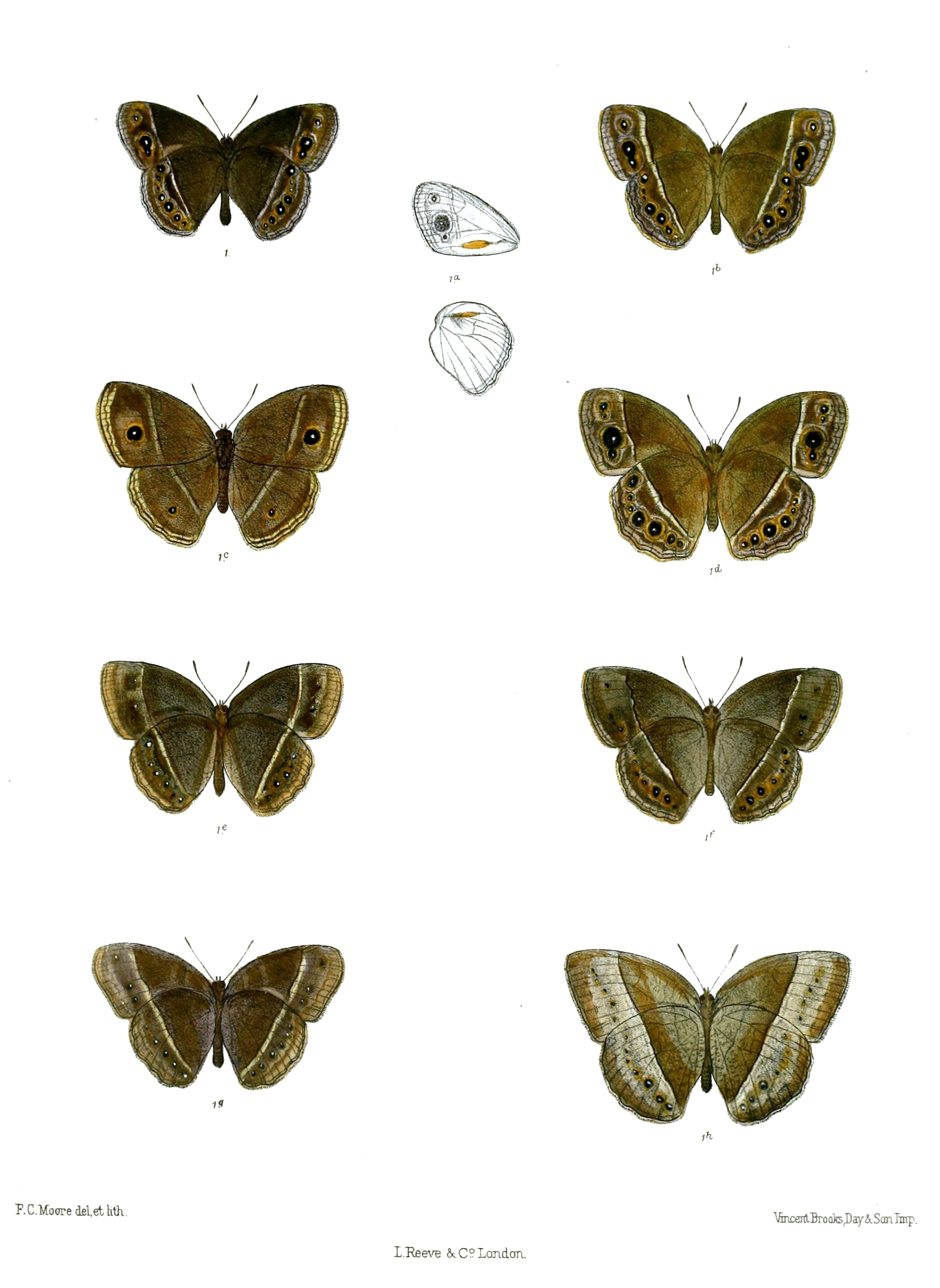
Illustration

===== Mycalesis visala (long-brand bushbrown) =====
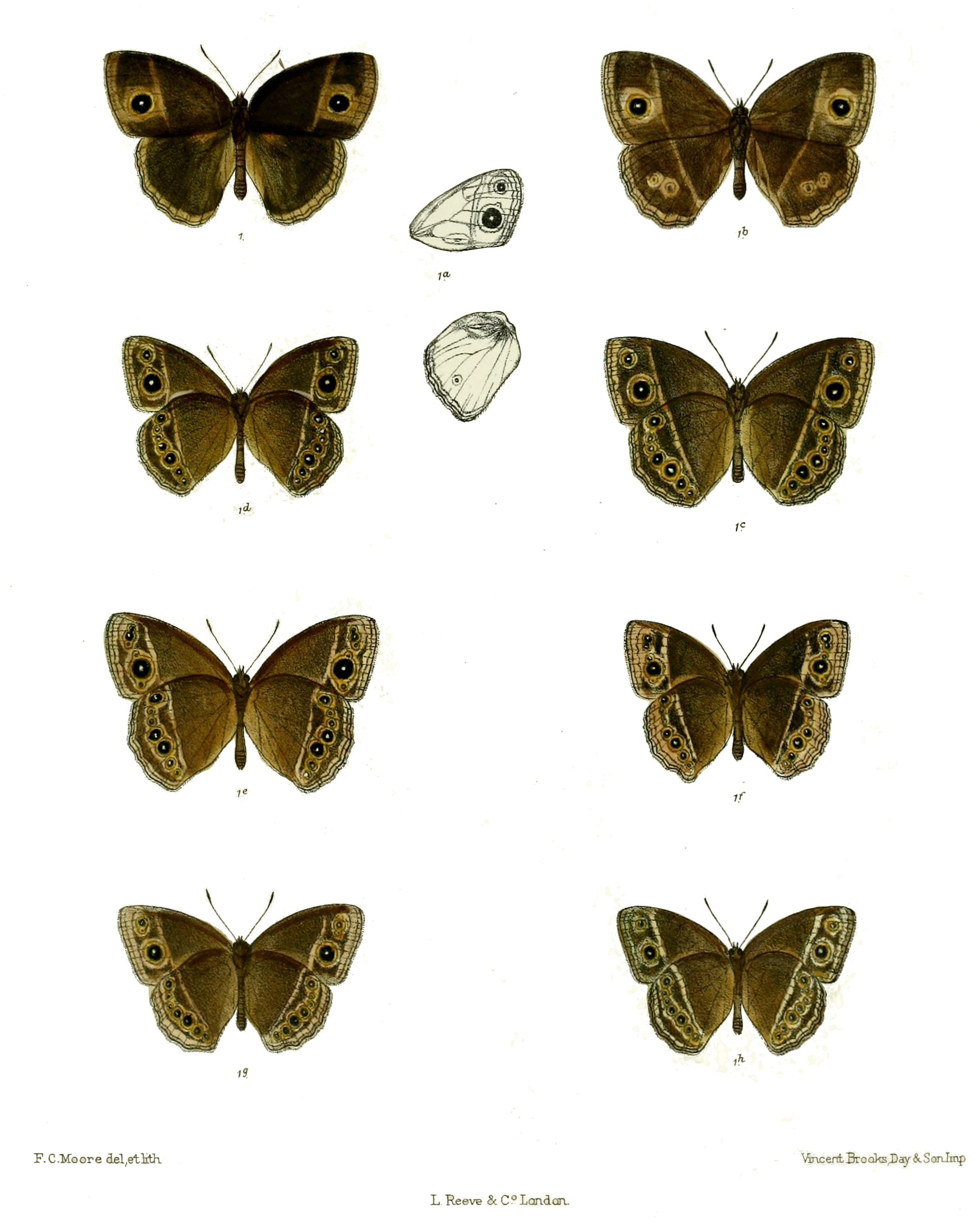
Illustration

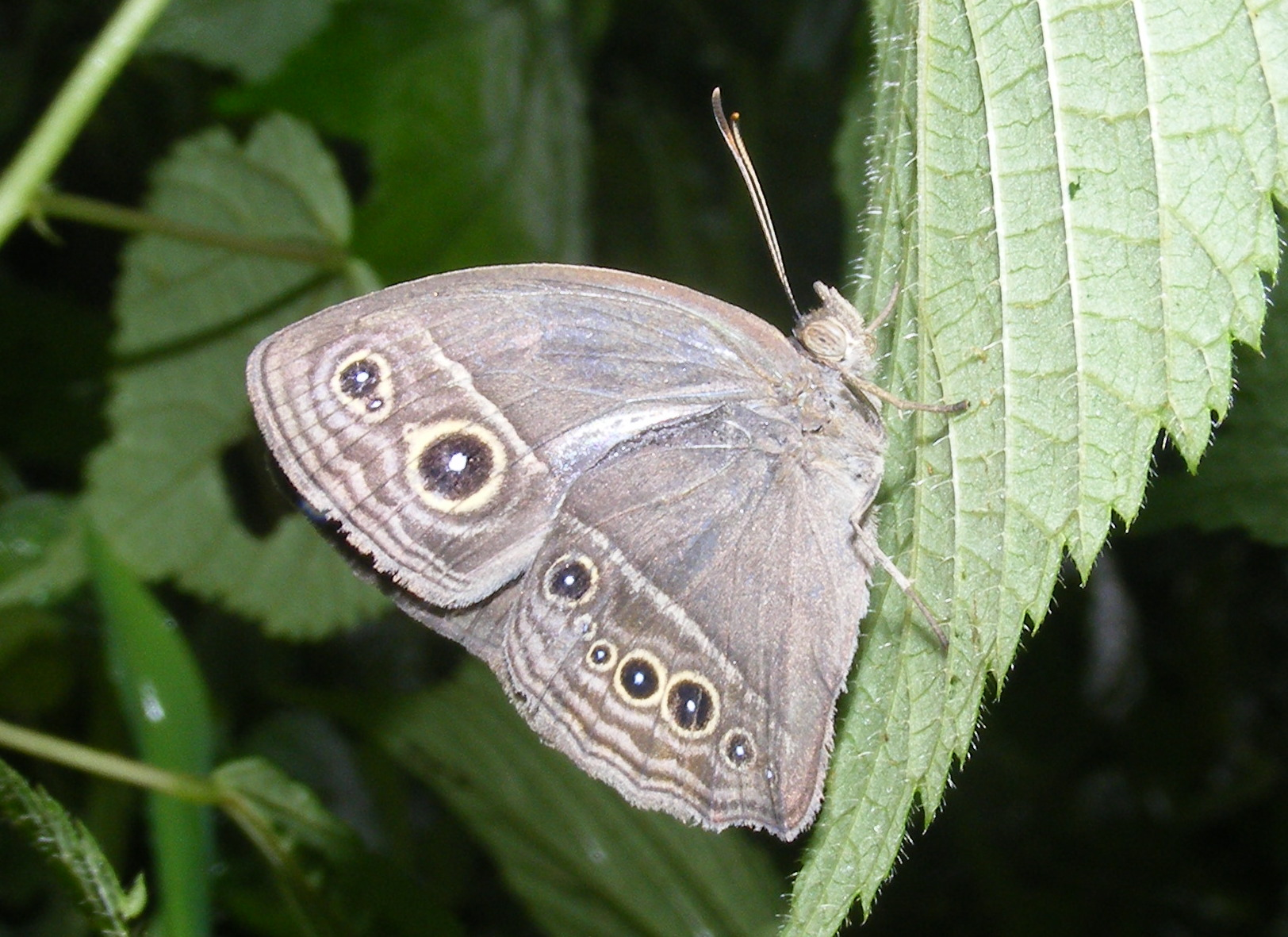
Ventral view

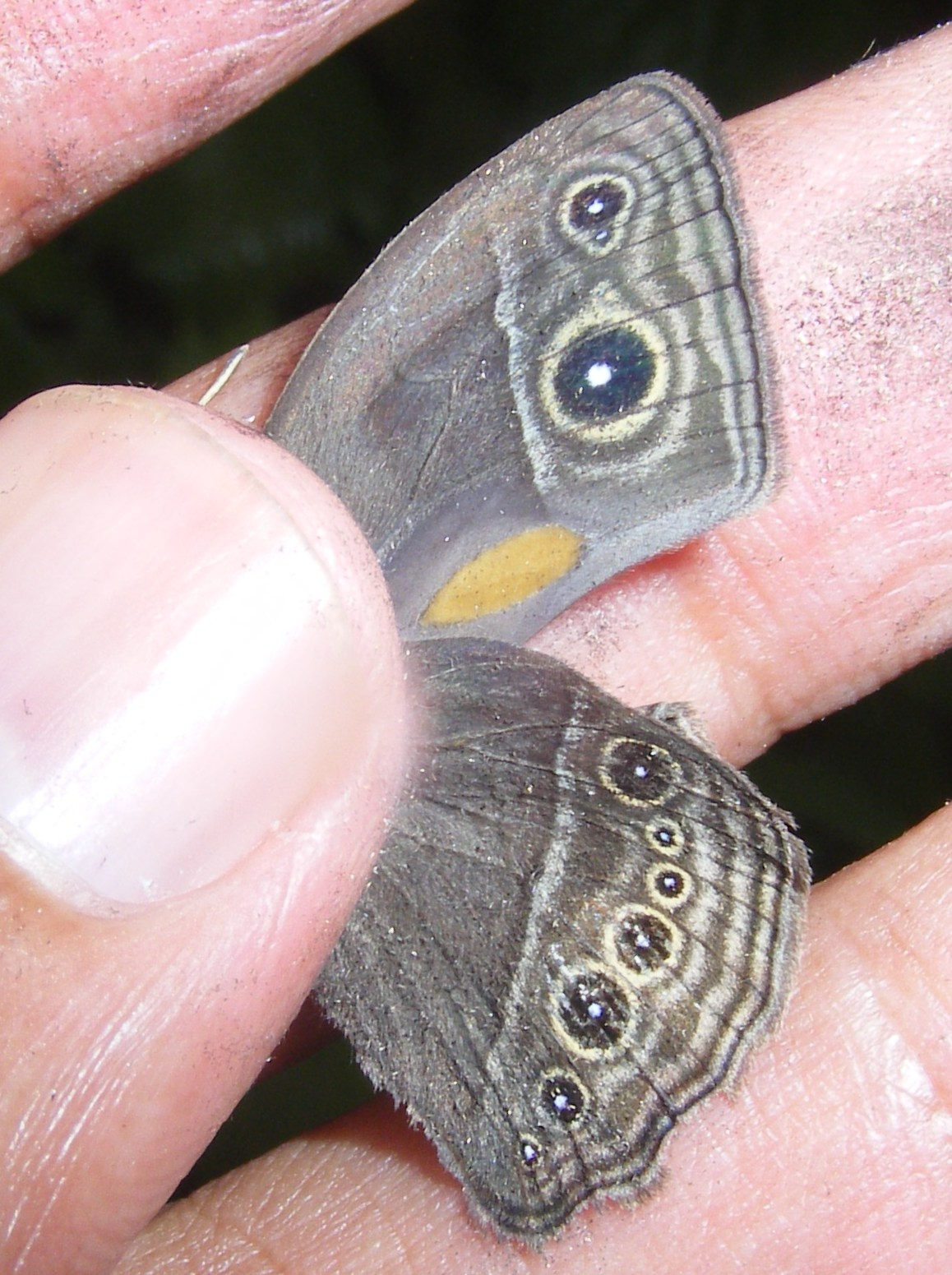
Brand on the underside of the forewing

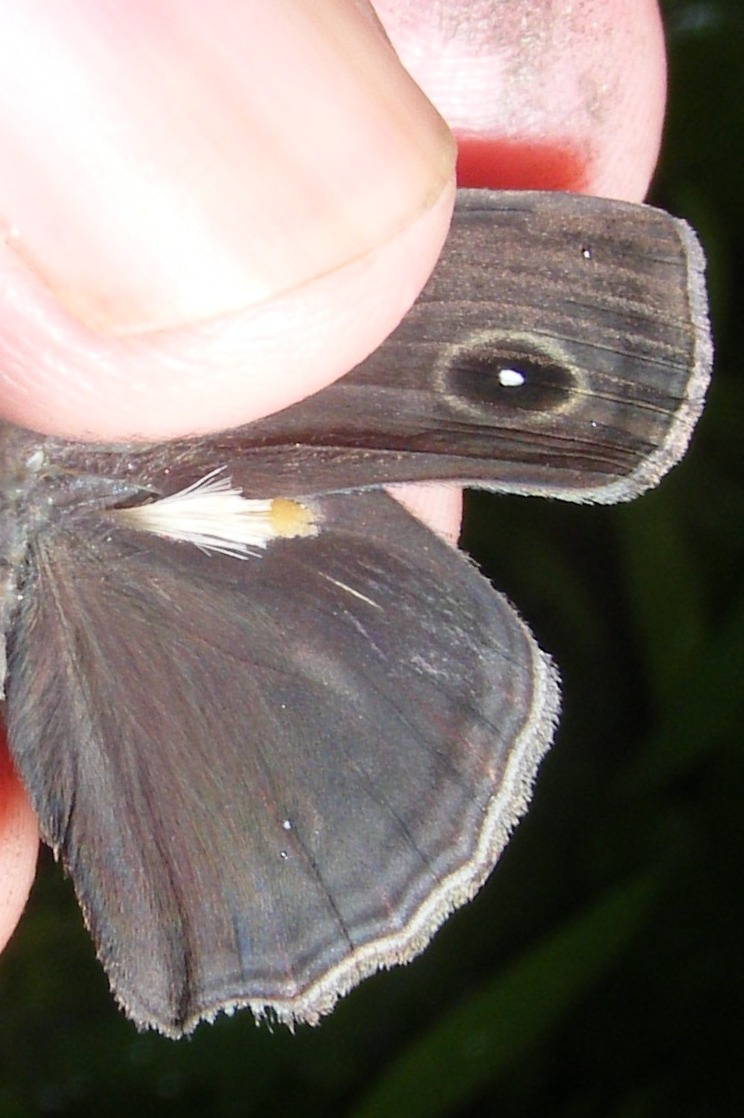
Brand on the upperside of the hindwing

==== Genus: Orsotriaena ====
===== Orsotriaena medus (dark grass-brown / smooth-eyed bushbrown) =====
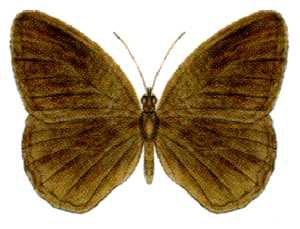
Dorsal view

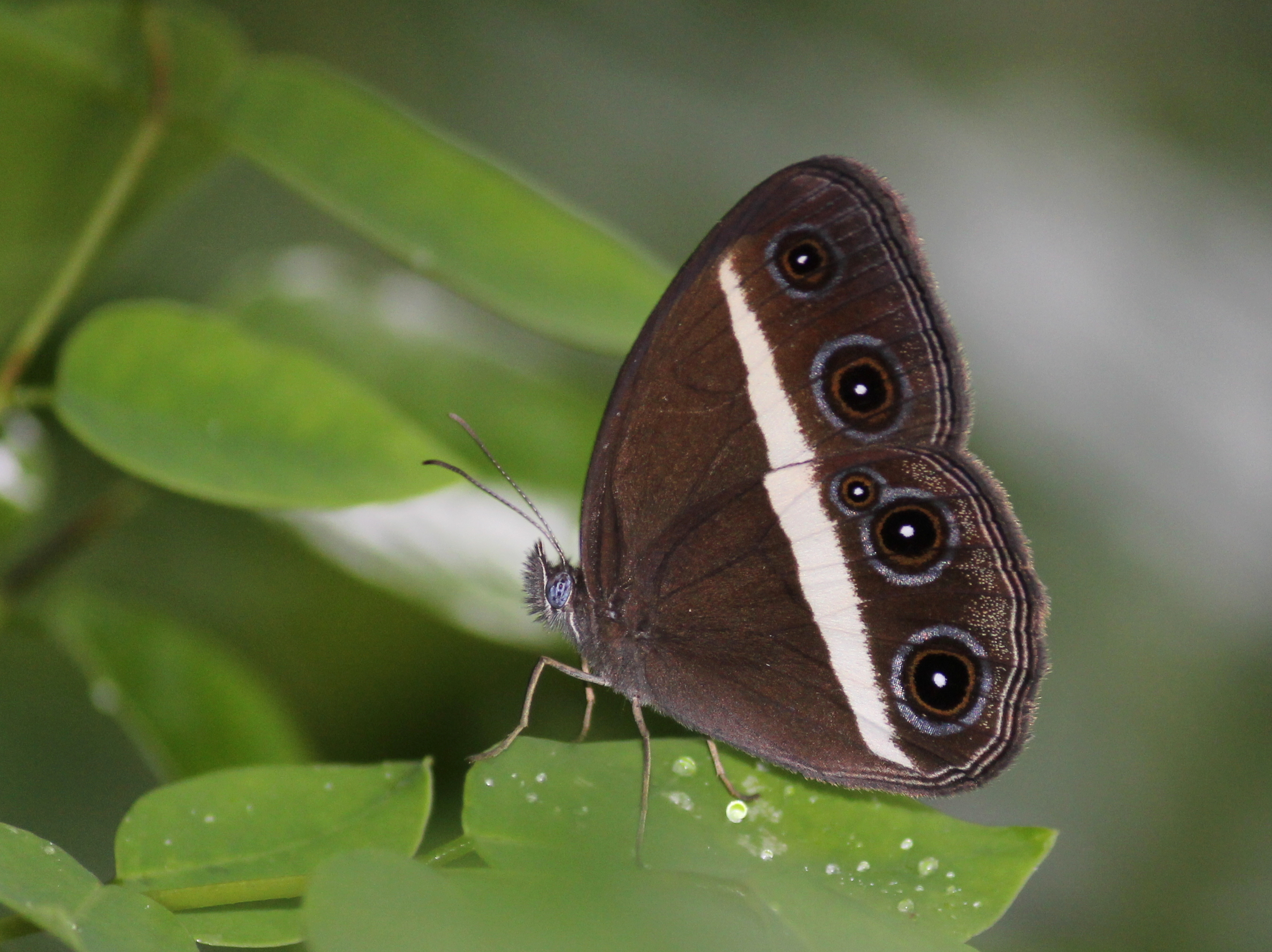
Ventral view

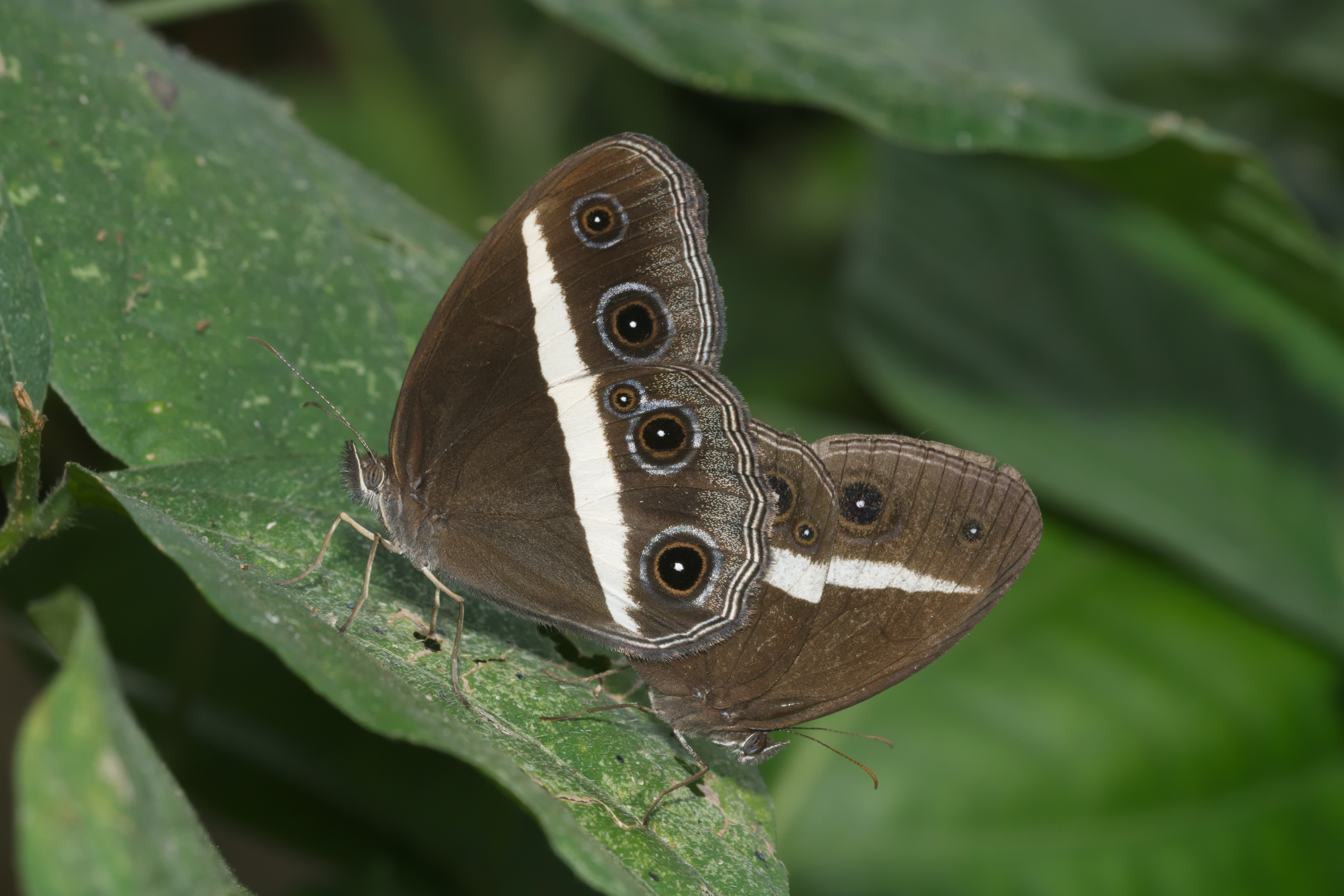
mating pair

==== Genus: Parantirrhoea ====
===== Parantirrhoea marshalli (Travancore evening brown) =====
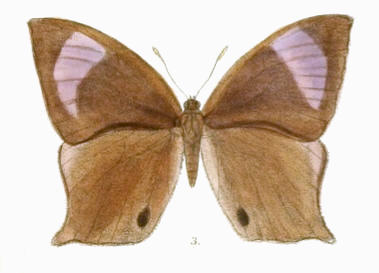
Dorsal view

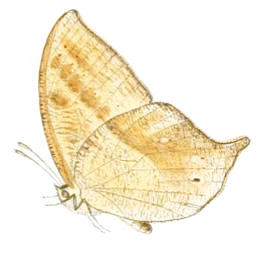
Ventral view

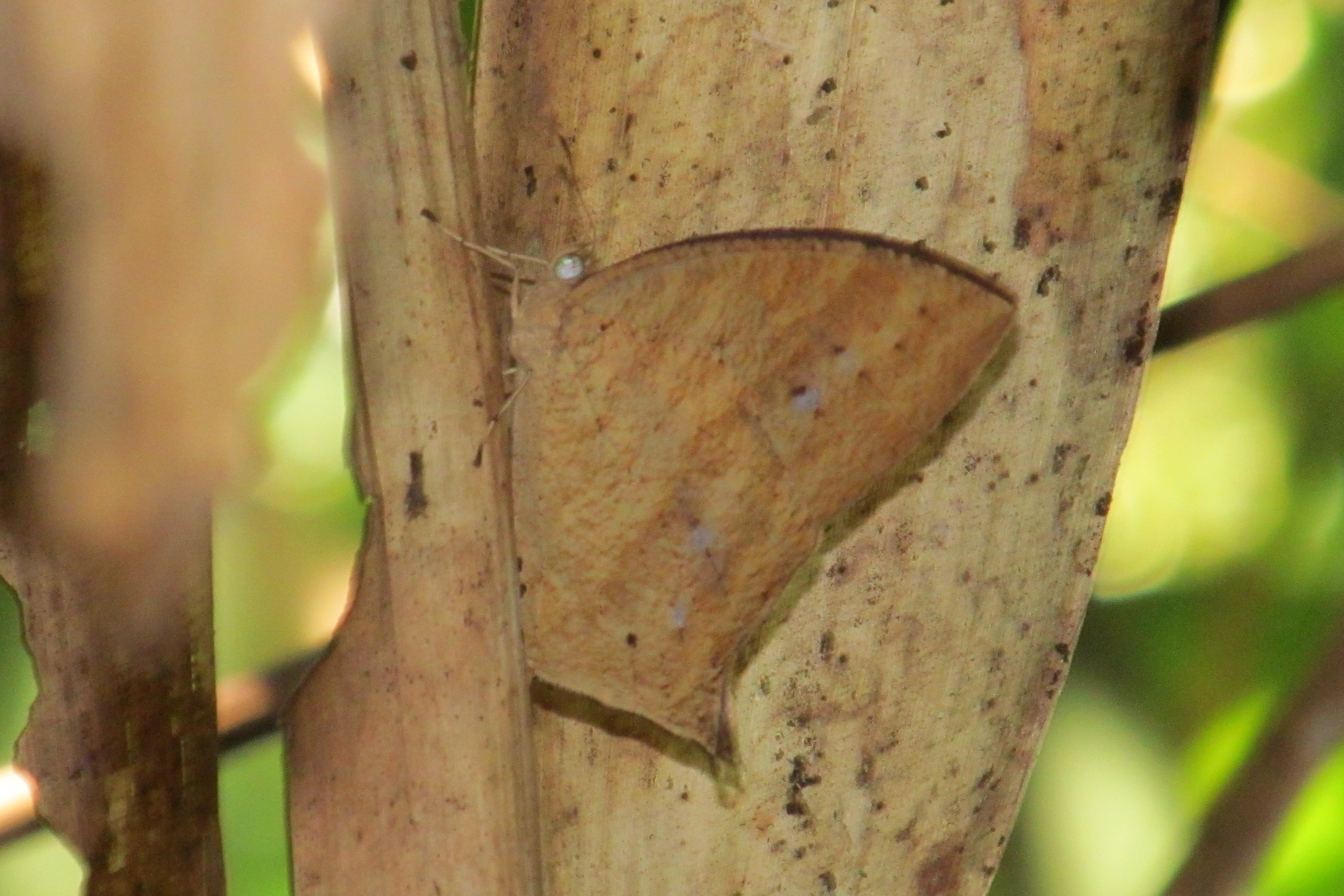

==== Genus: Ypthima (rings) ====
===== Ypthima asterope (common threering) =====
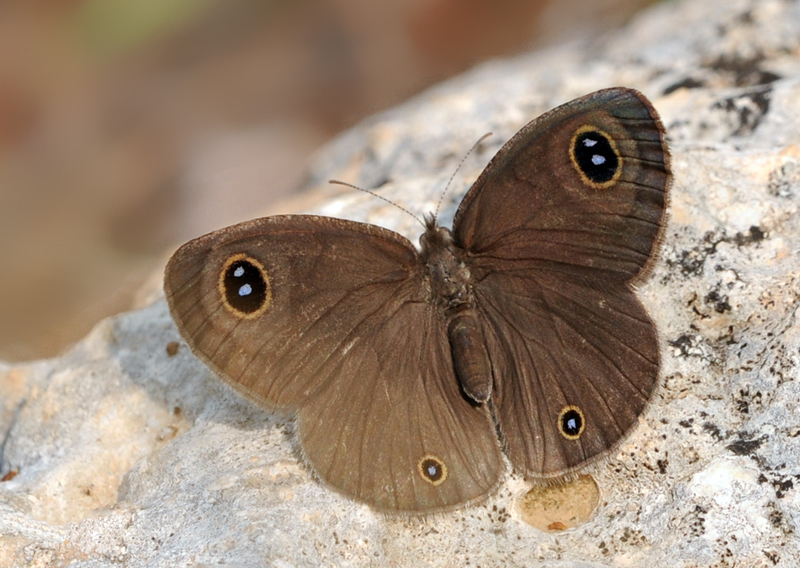
Dorsal view

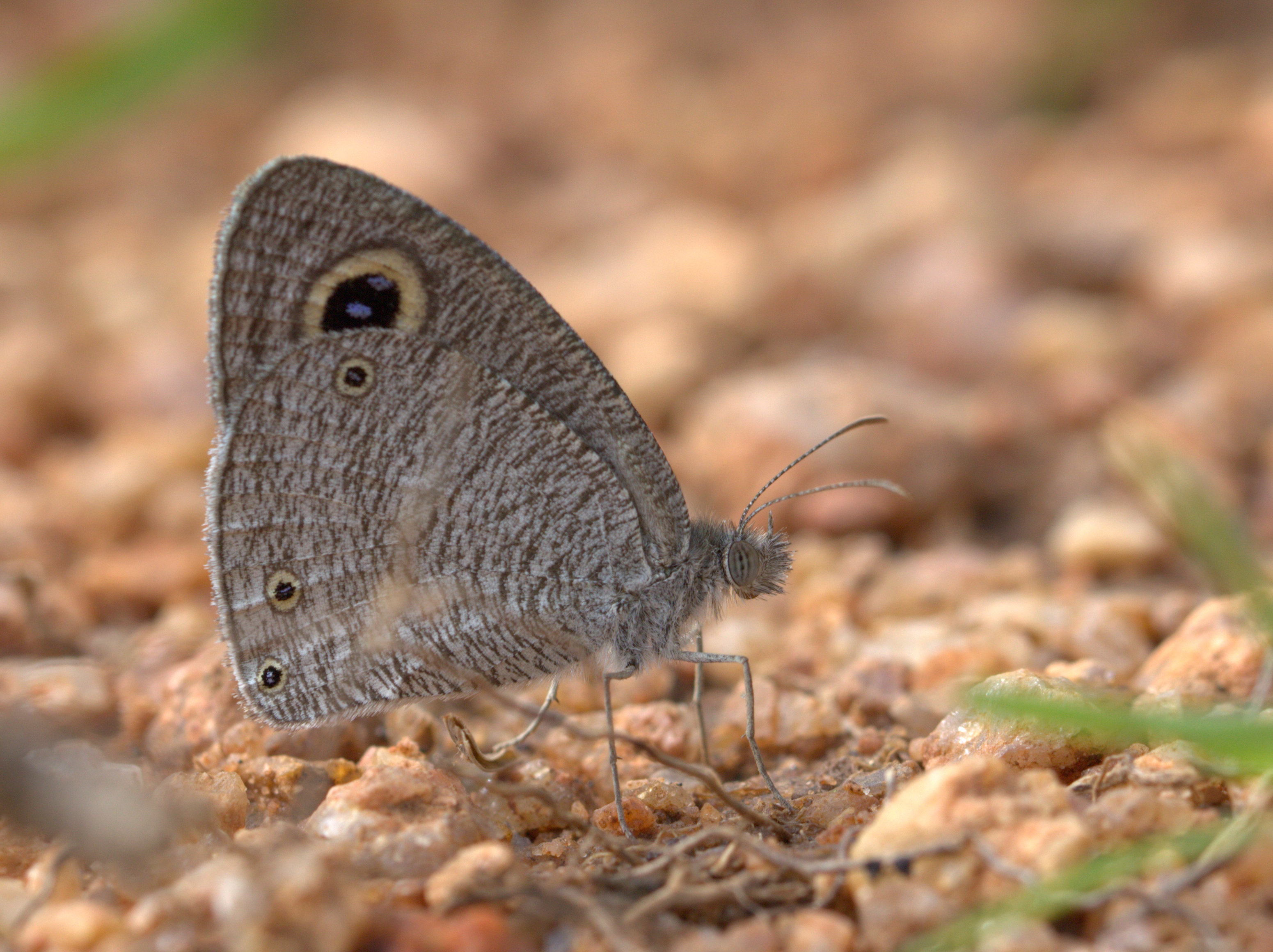
Ventral view

===== Ypthima baldus (common fivering) =====
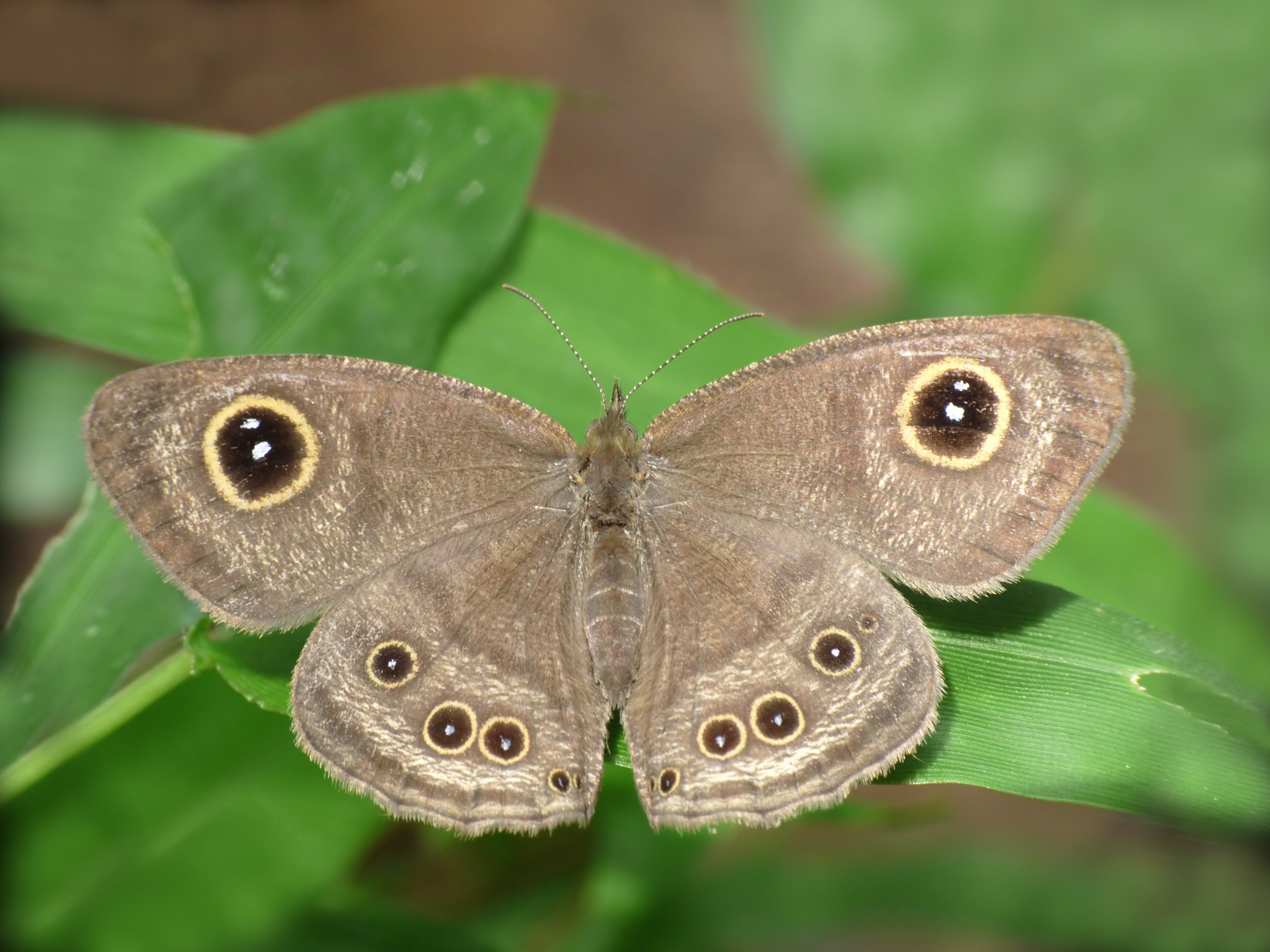
Dorsal view

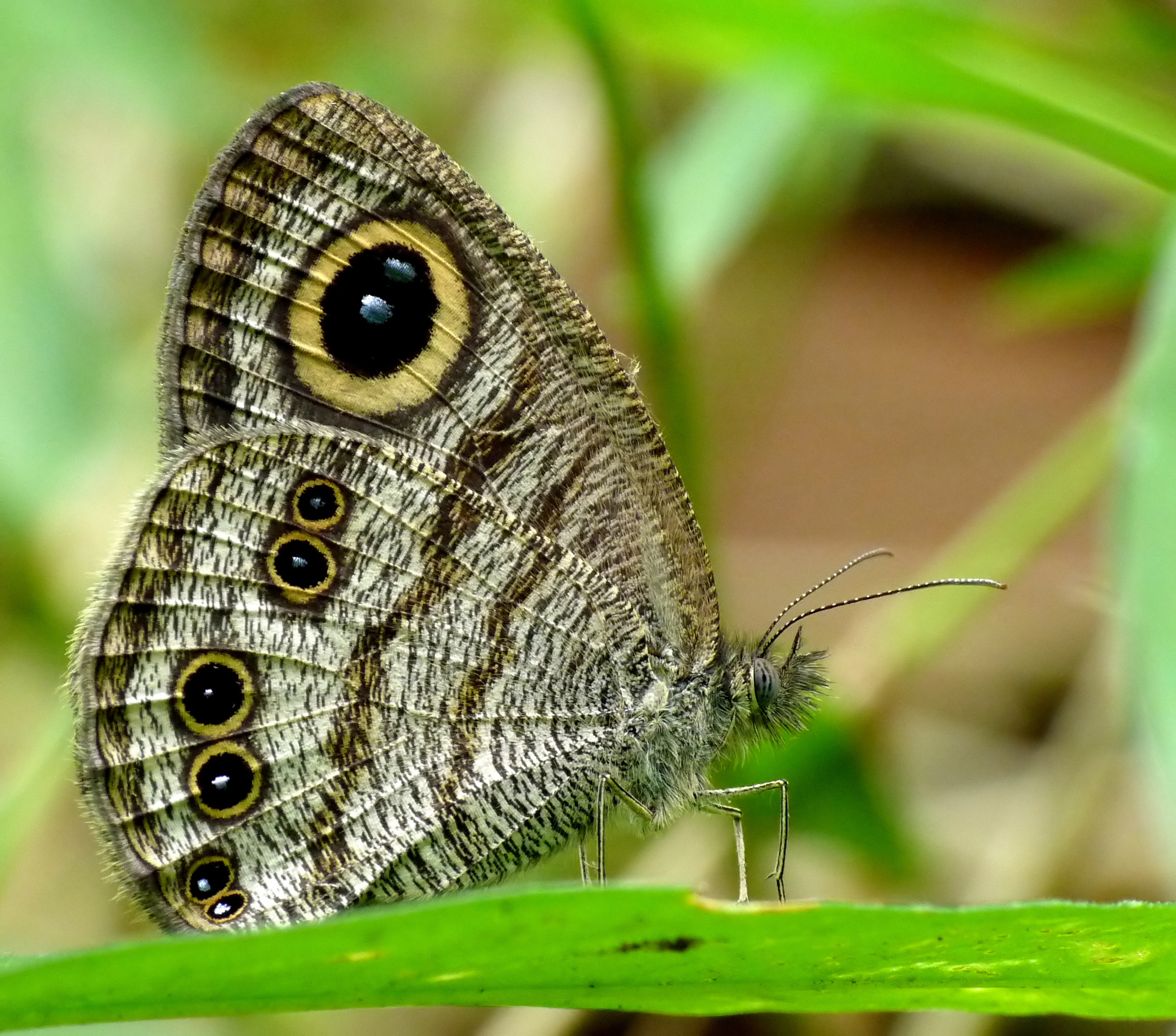
Ventral view (wet-season form)

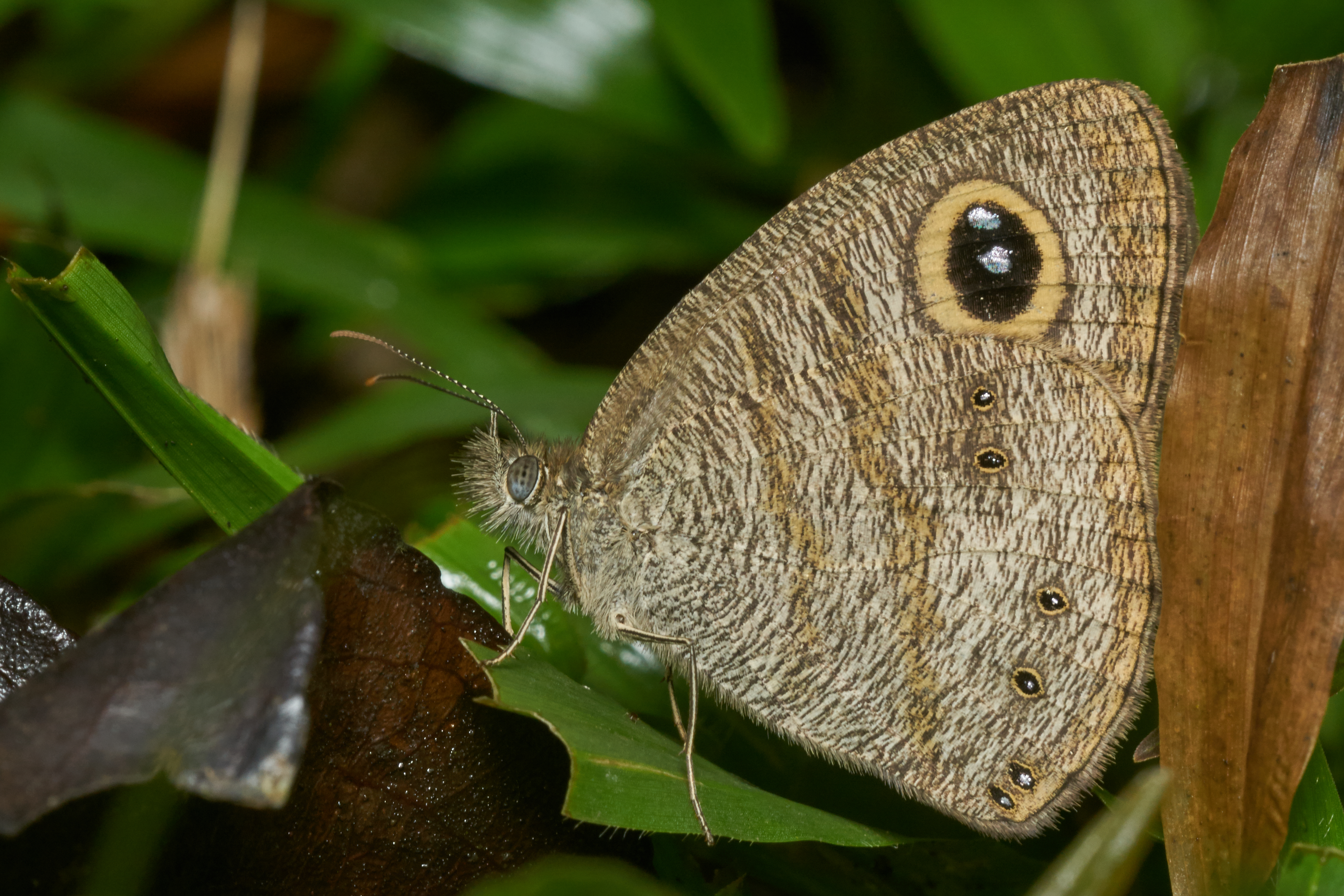
Ventral view (dry-season form)

===== Ypthima ceylonica (white fourring) =====
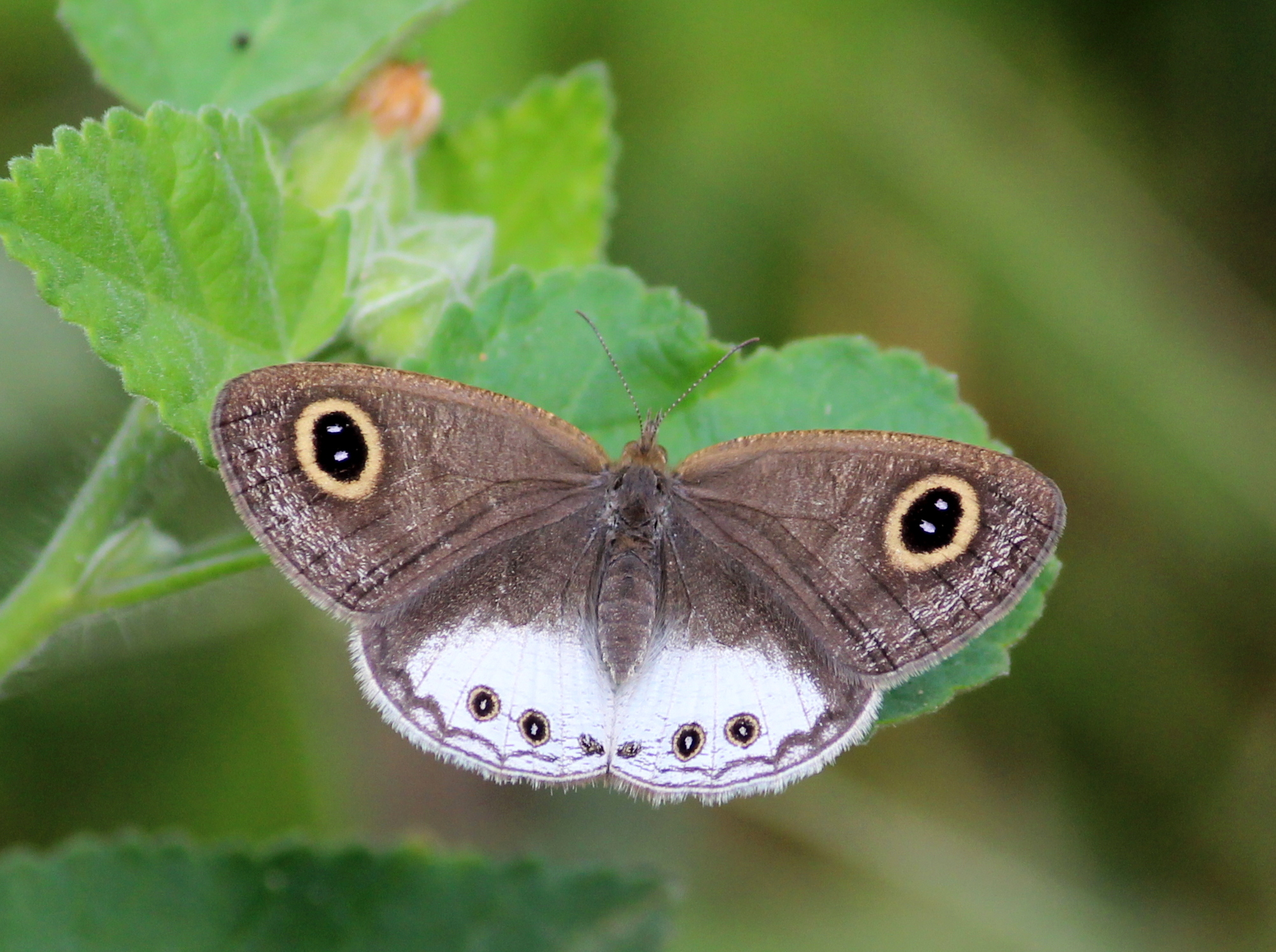
Dorsal view

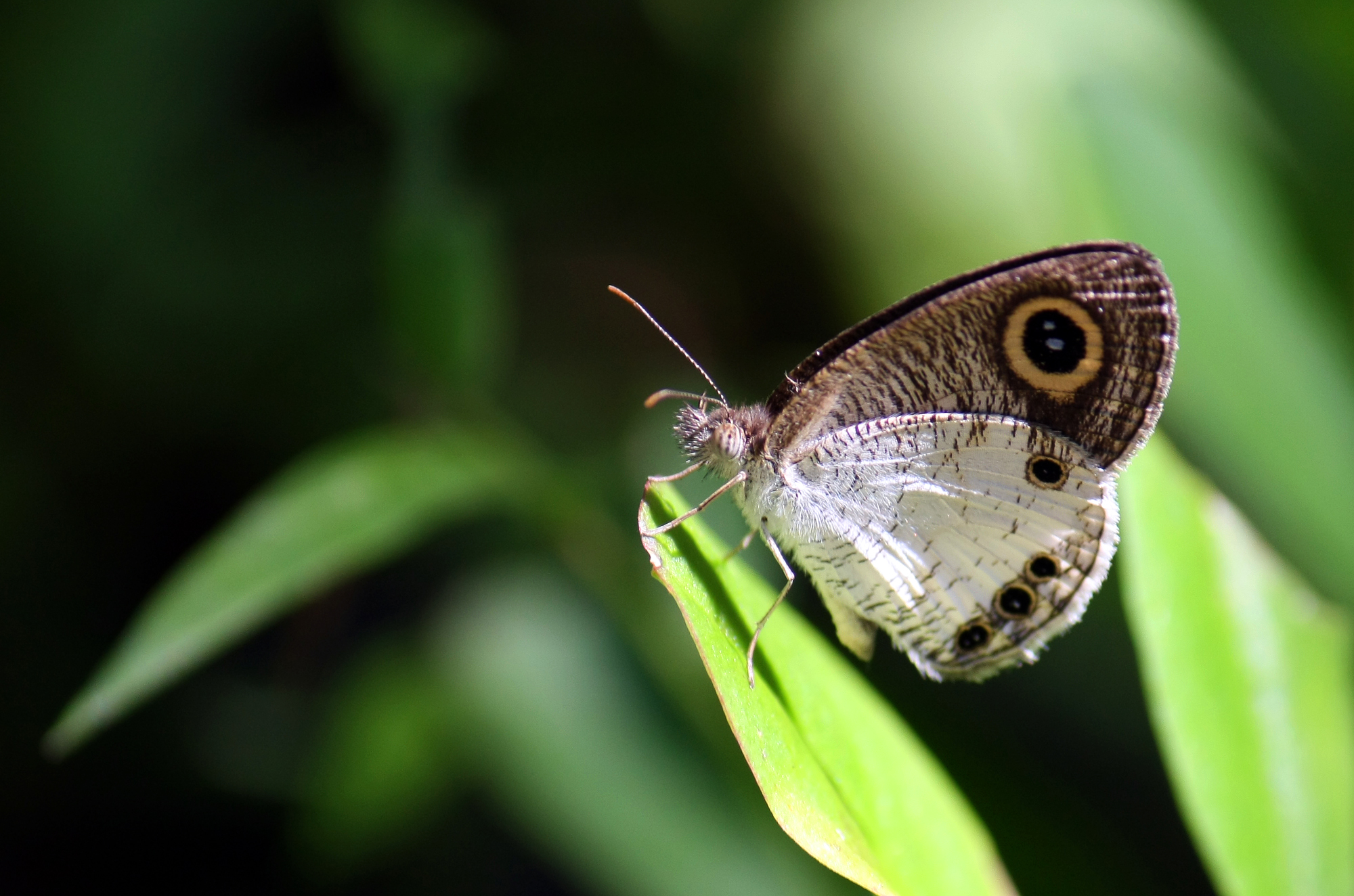
Ventral view

===== Ypthima chenu (Nilgiri fourring) =====
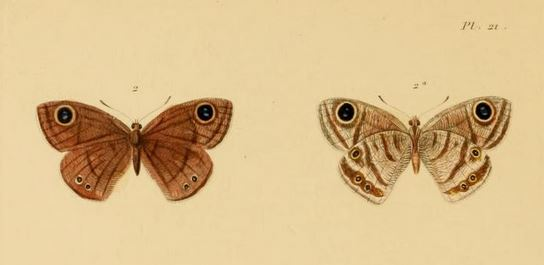
Illustarion

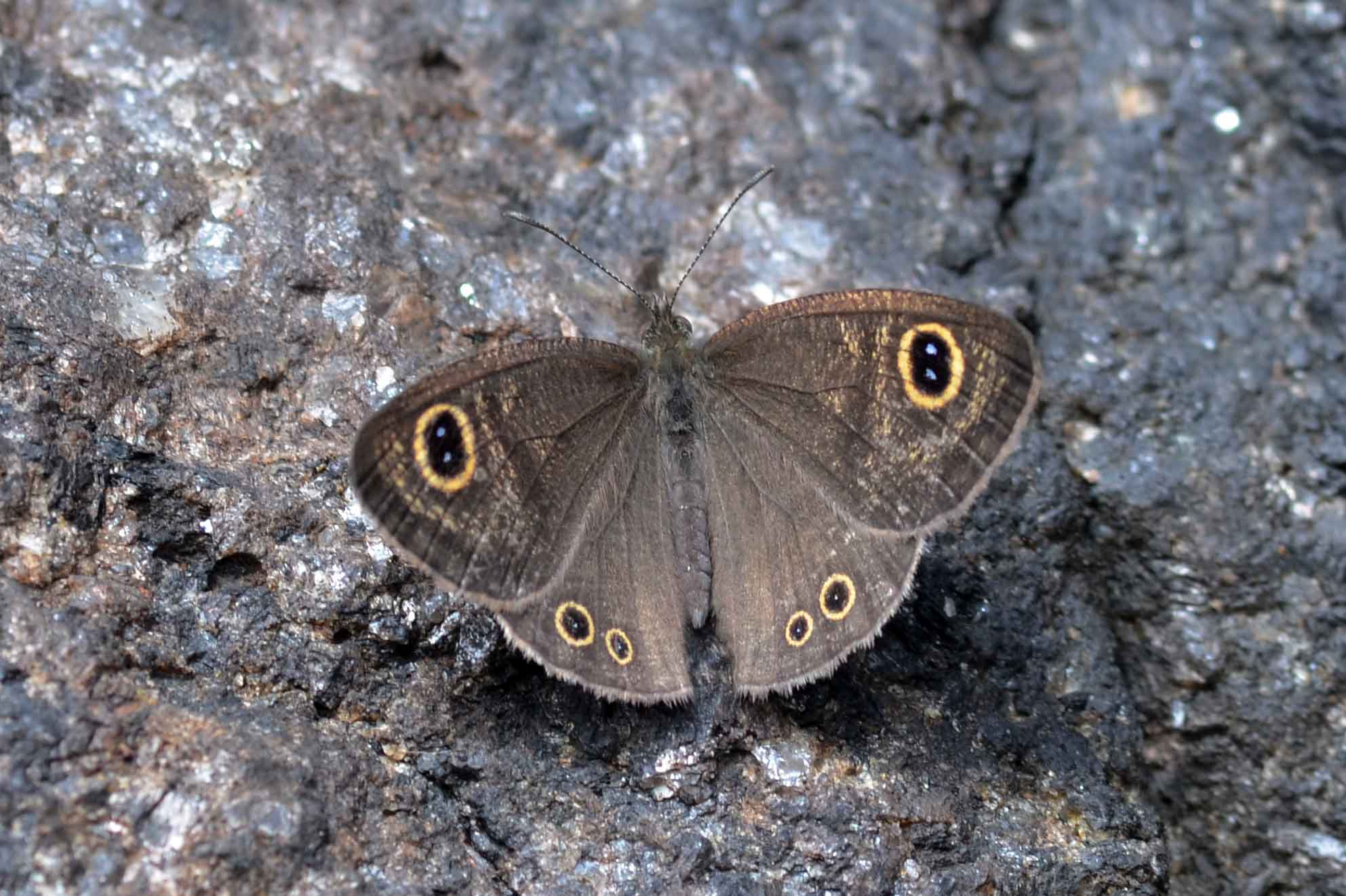
Dorsal view

===== Ypthima huebneri (common fourring) =====
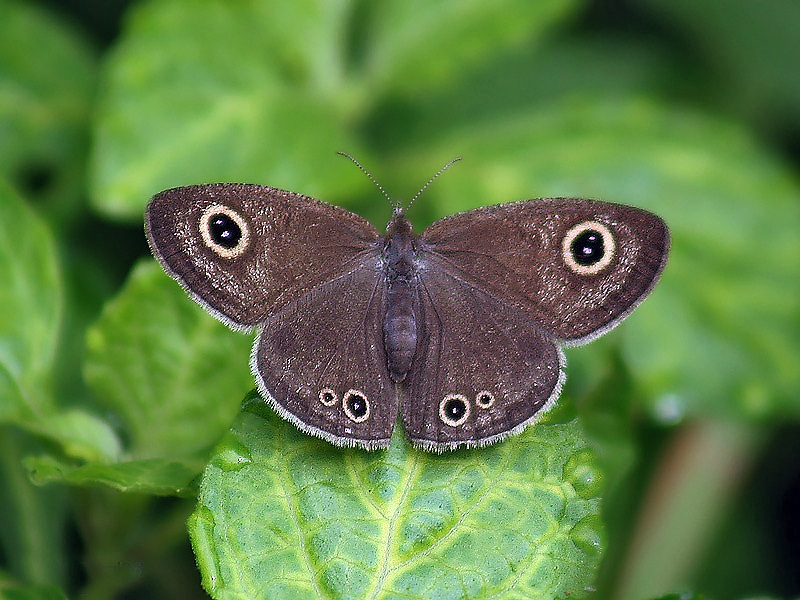
Dorsal view

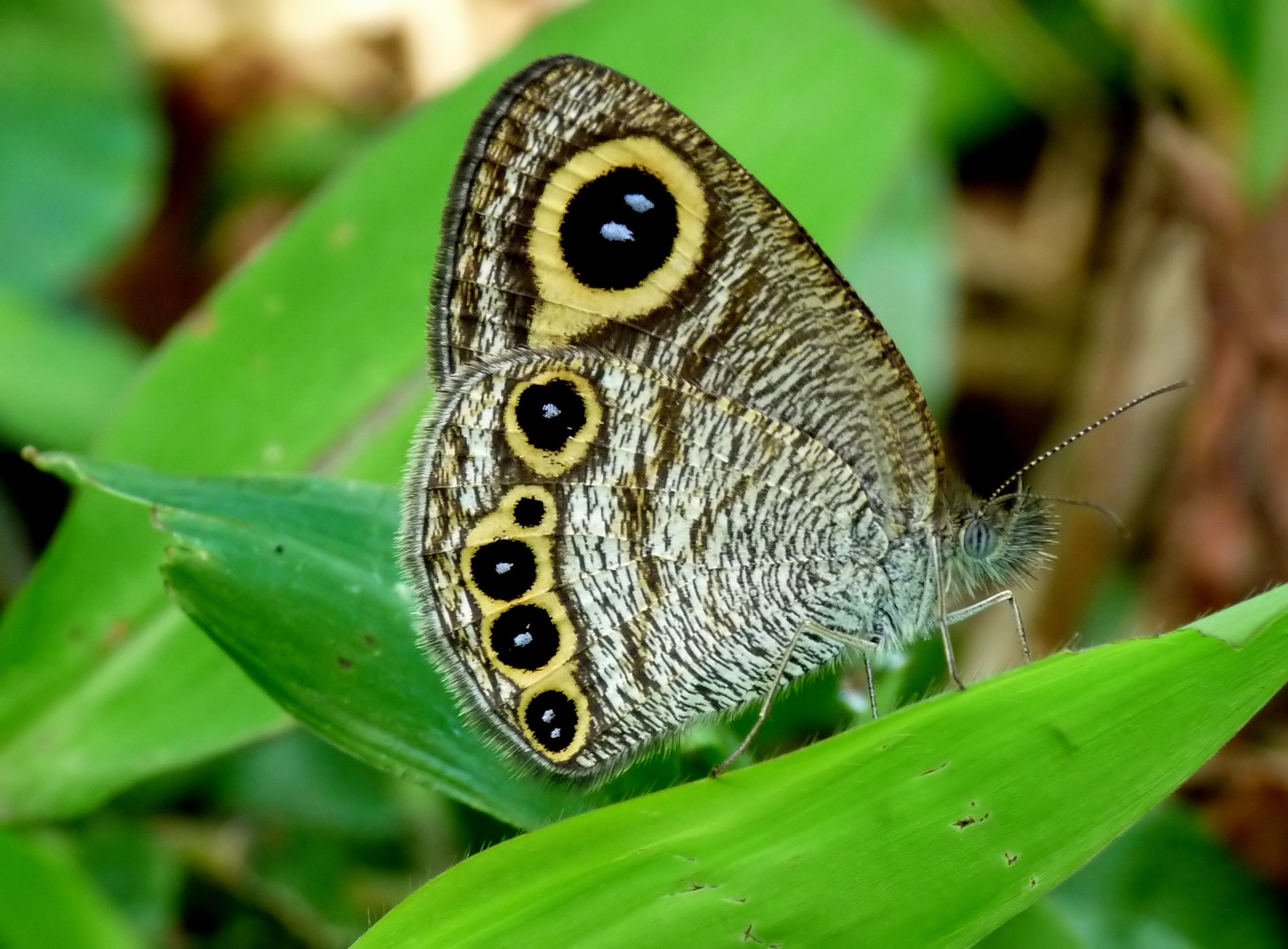
Ventral view

===== Ypthima singala (Sinhalese fivering) =====
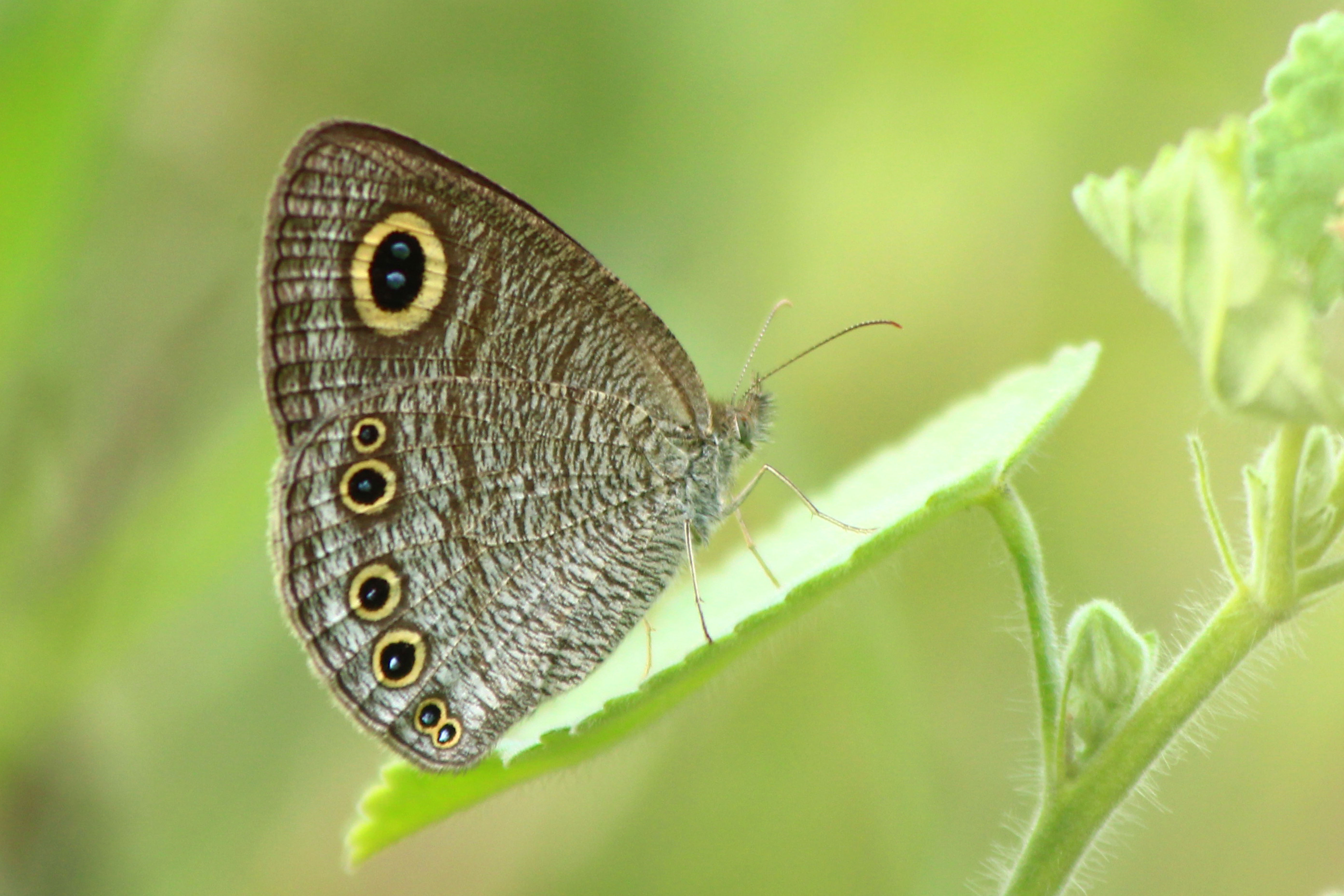
Ventral view

===== Ypthima striata (Nilgiri jewel fourring) =====
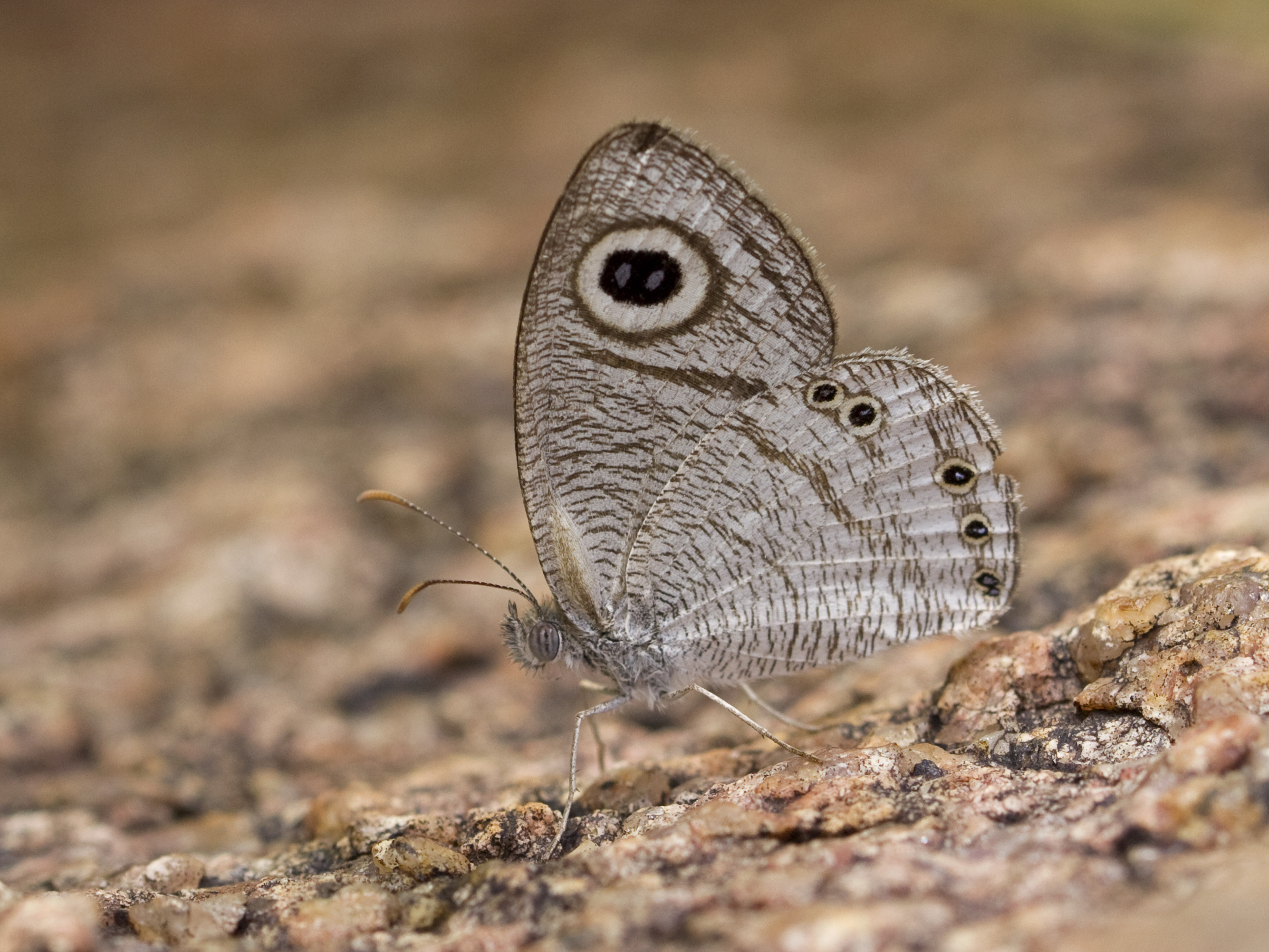
Ventral view

===== Ypthima philomela/tabella (baby fivering) =====
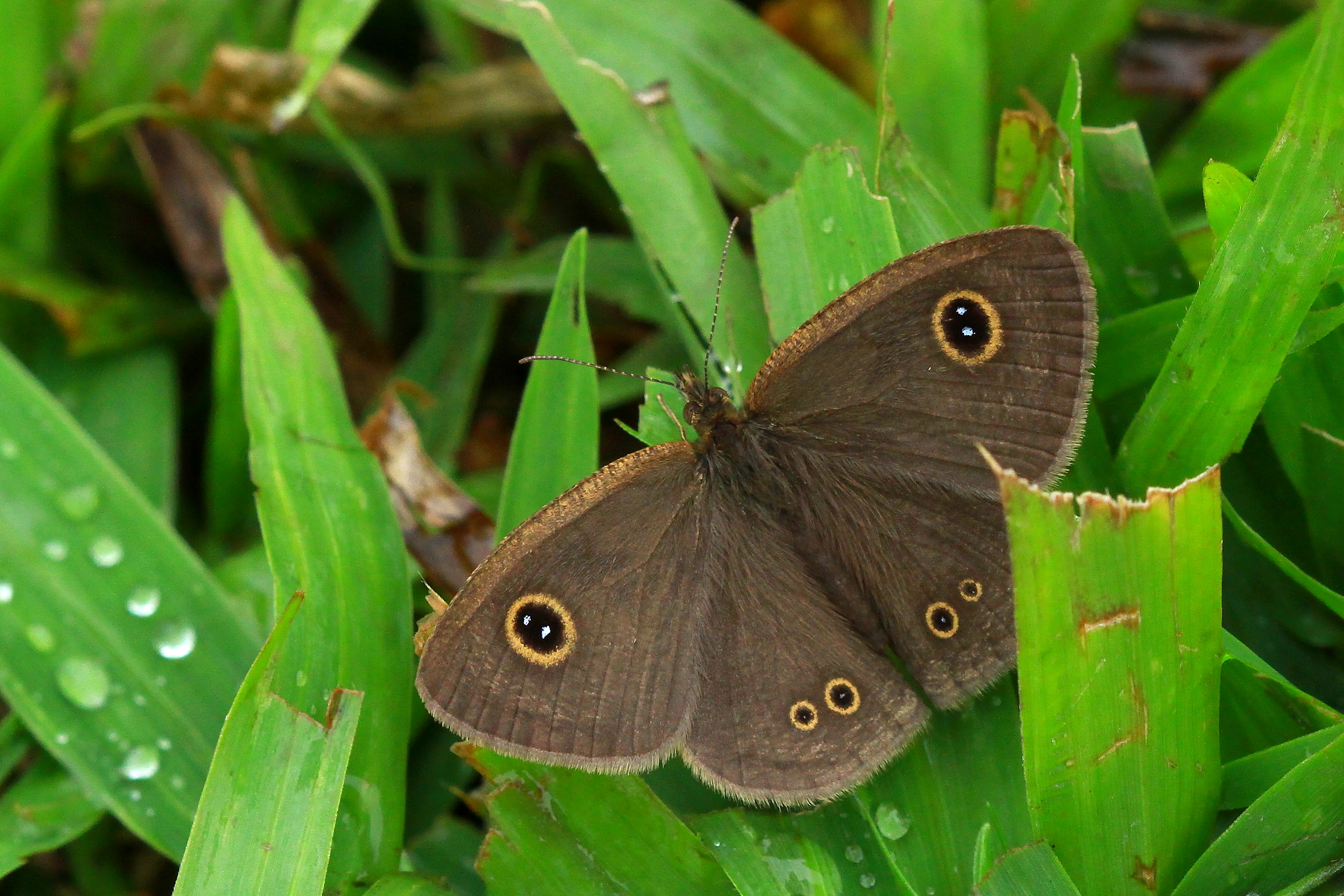
Dorsal view

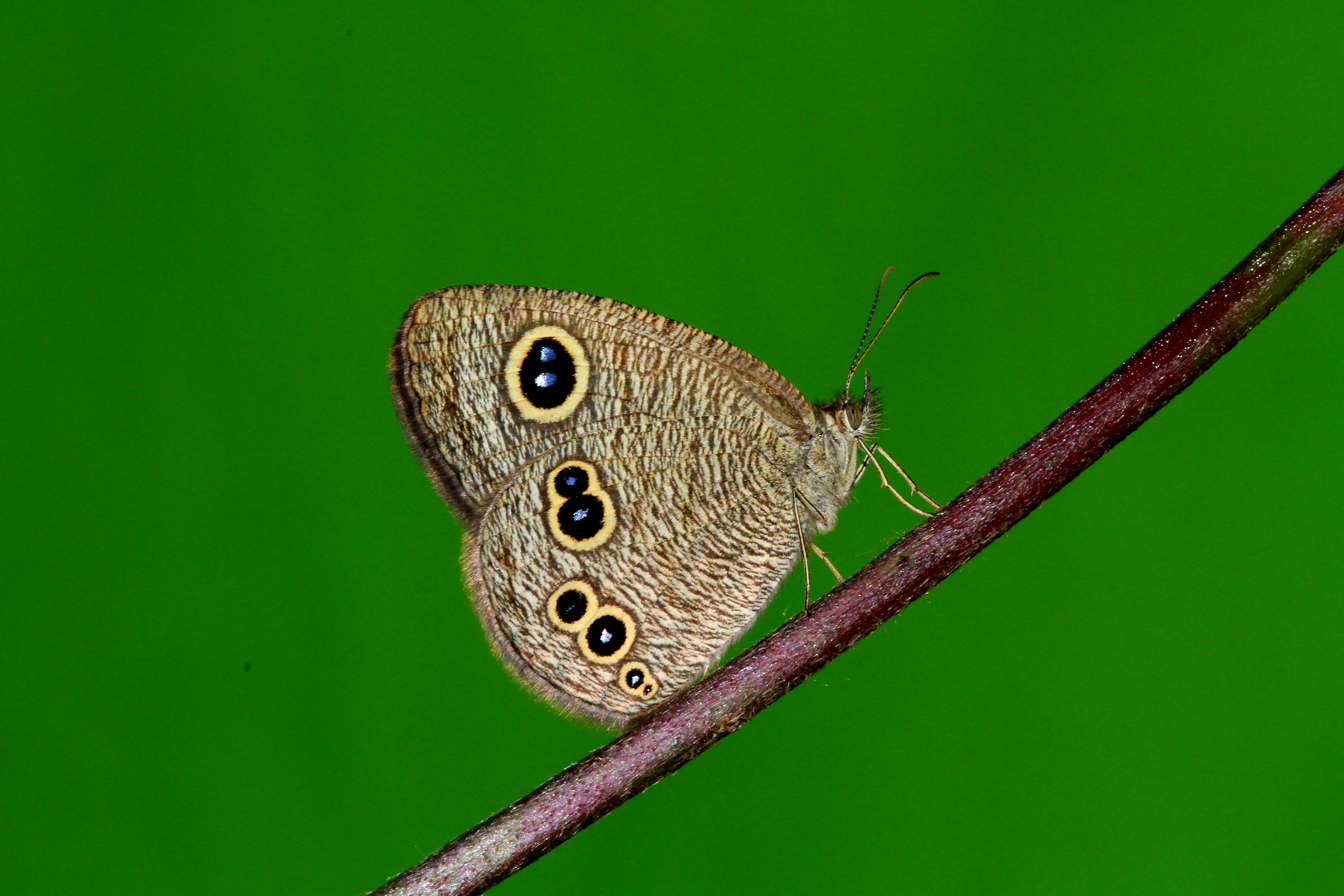
Ventral view

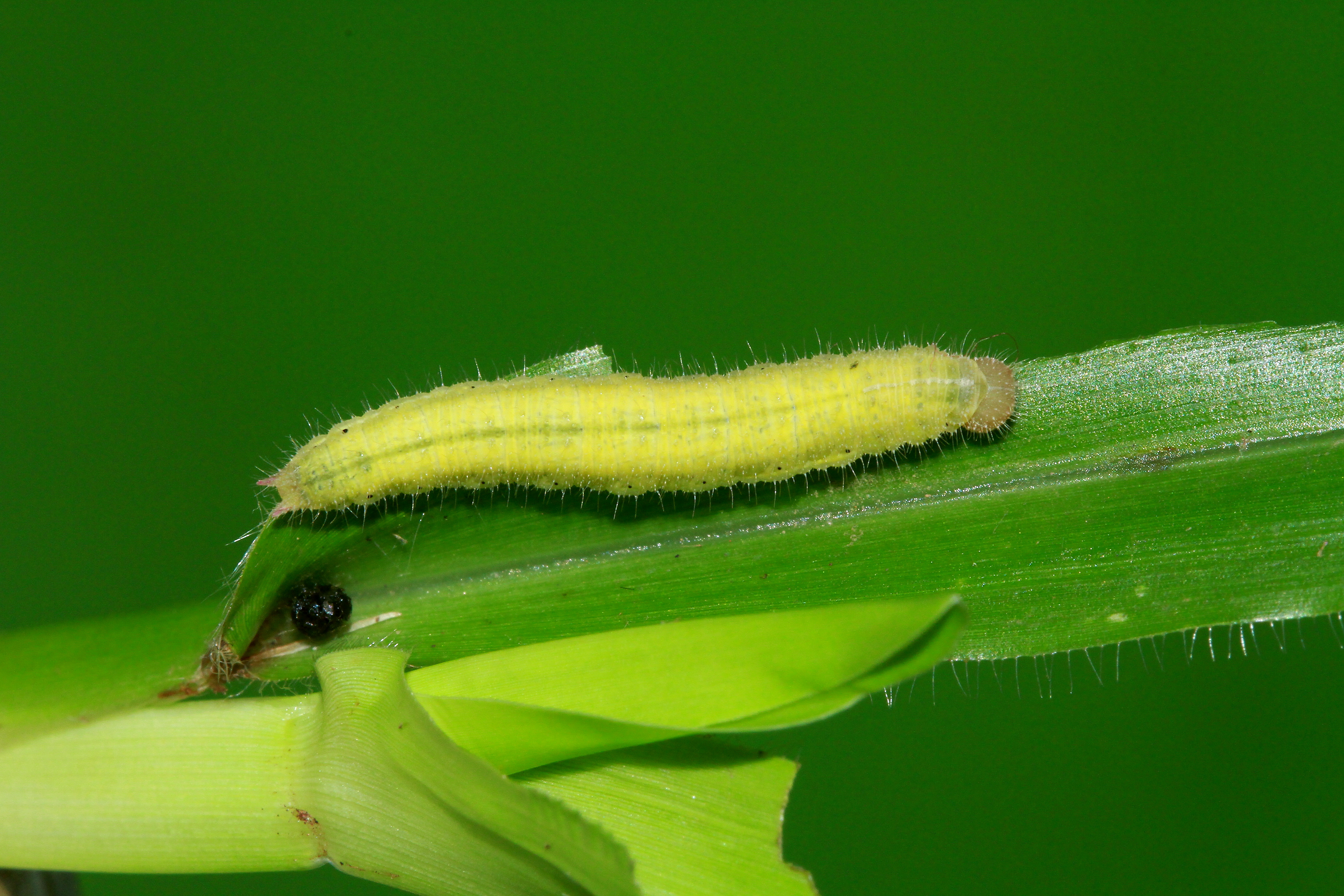
Larva

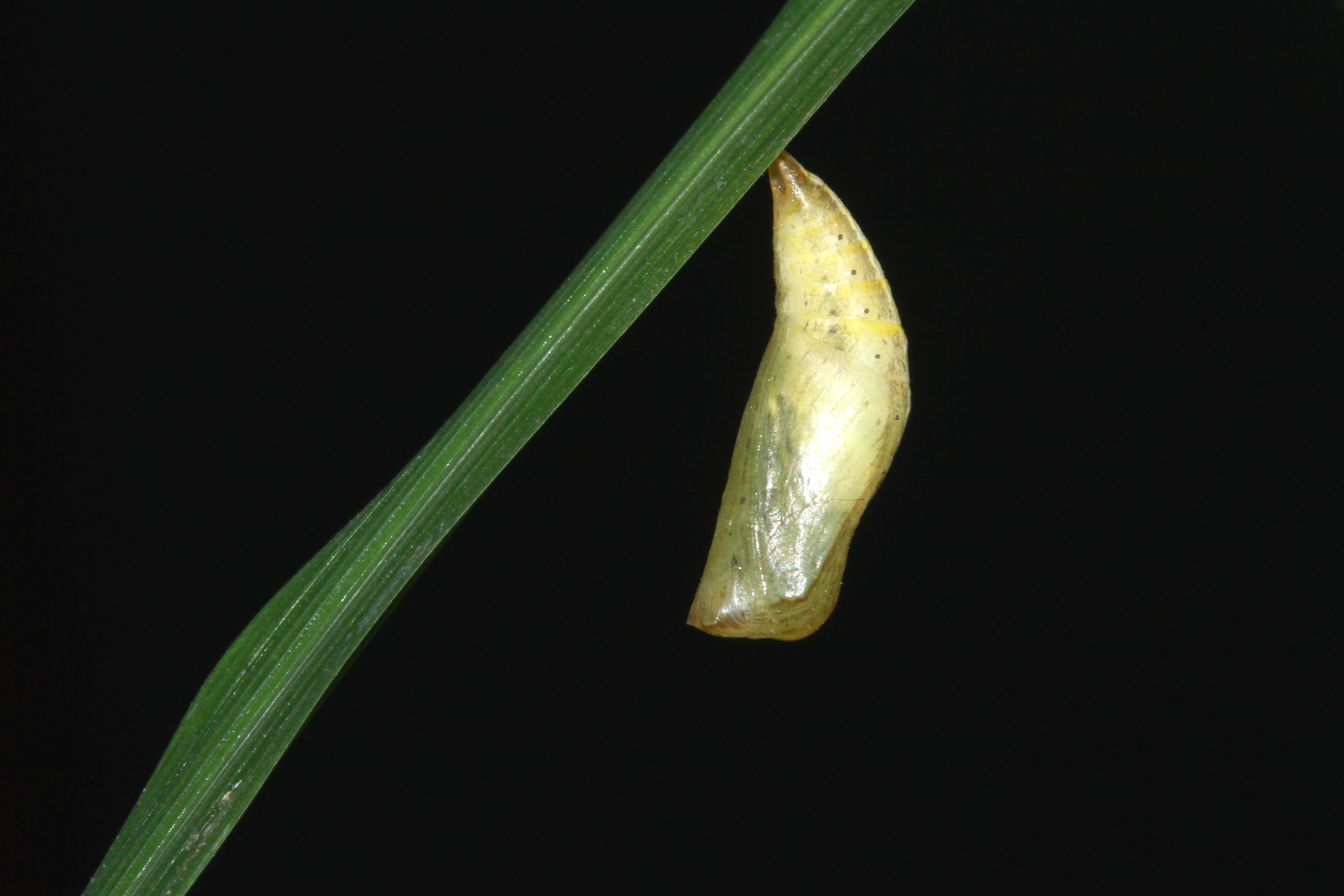
Chrysalis

===== Ypthima ypthimoides (Palni fourring) =====
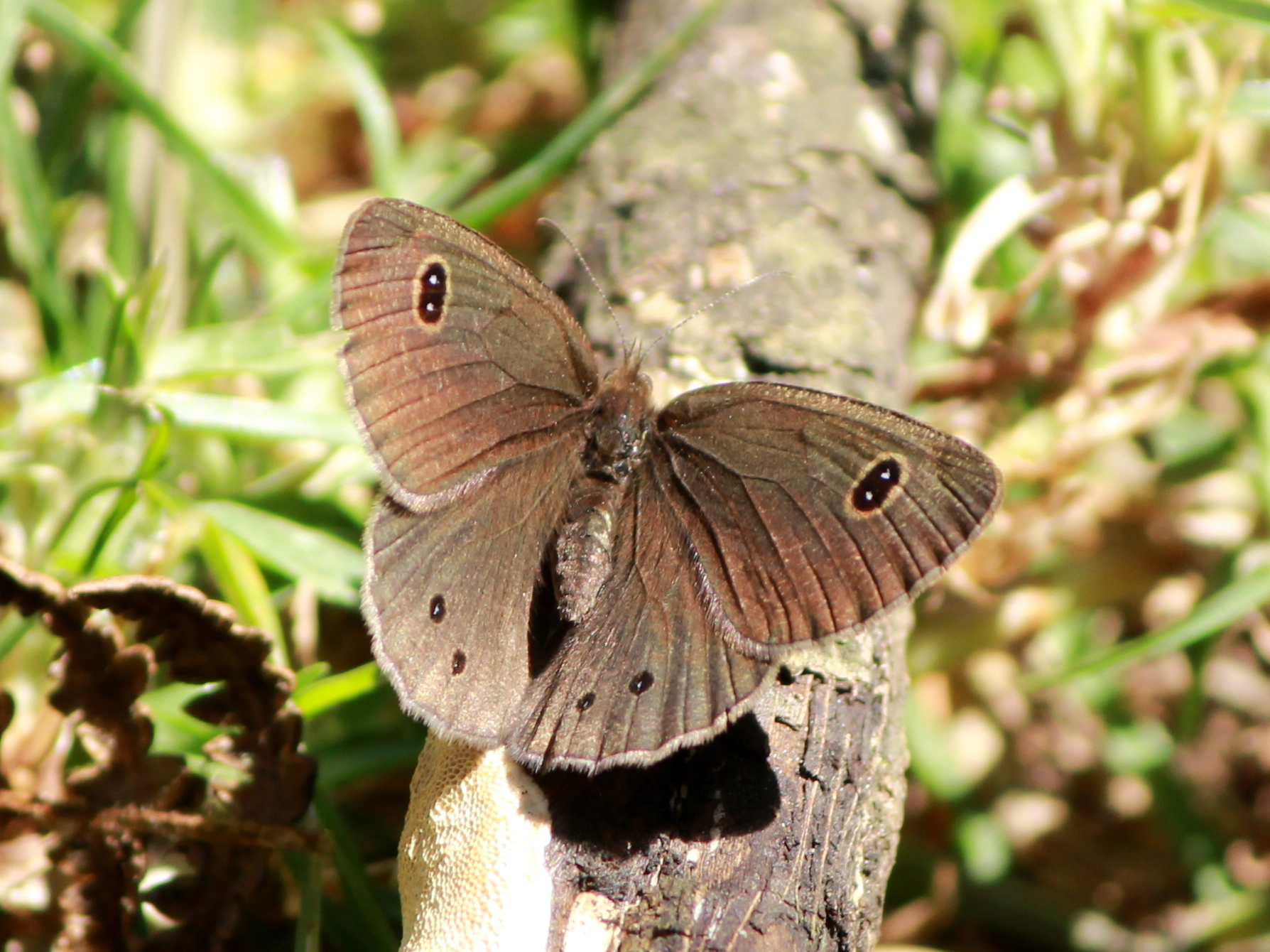
Dorsal view

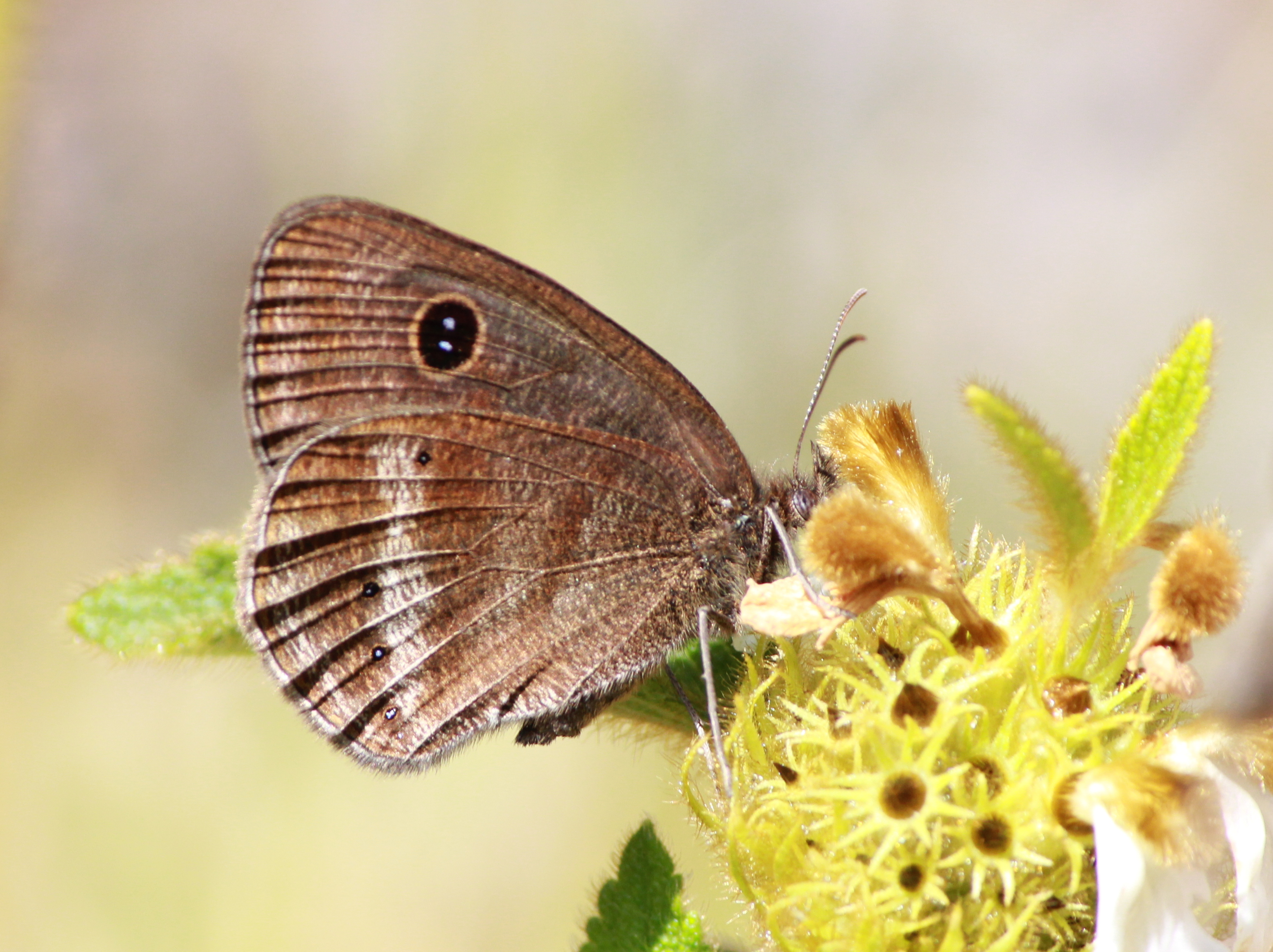
Ventral view

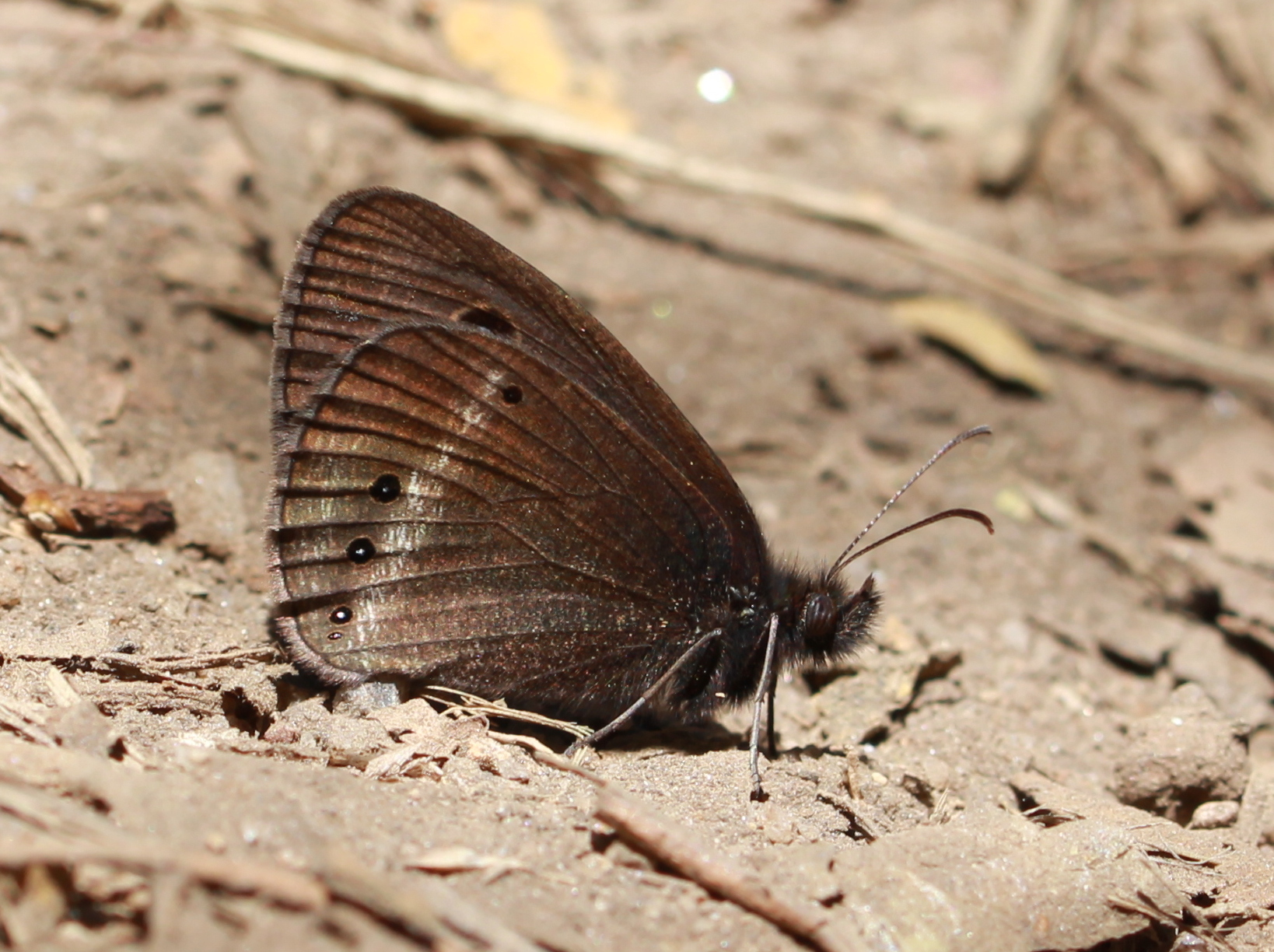
Ventral view

==== Genus: Zipaetis (catseyes) ====
===== Zipaetis saitis (Tamil catseye) =====
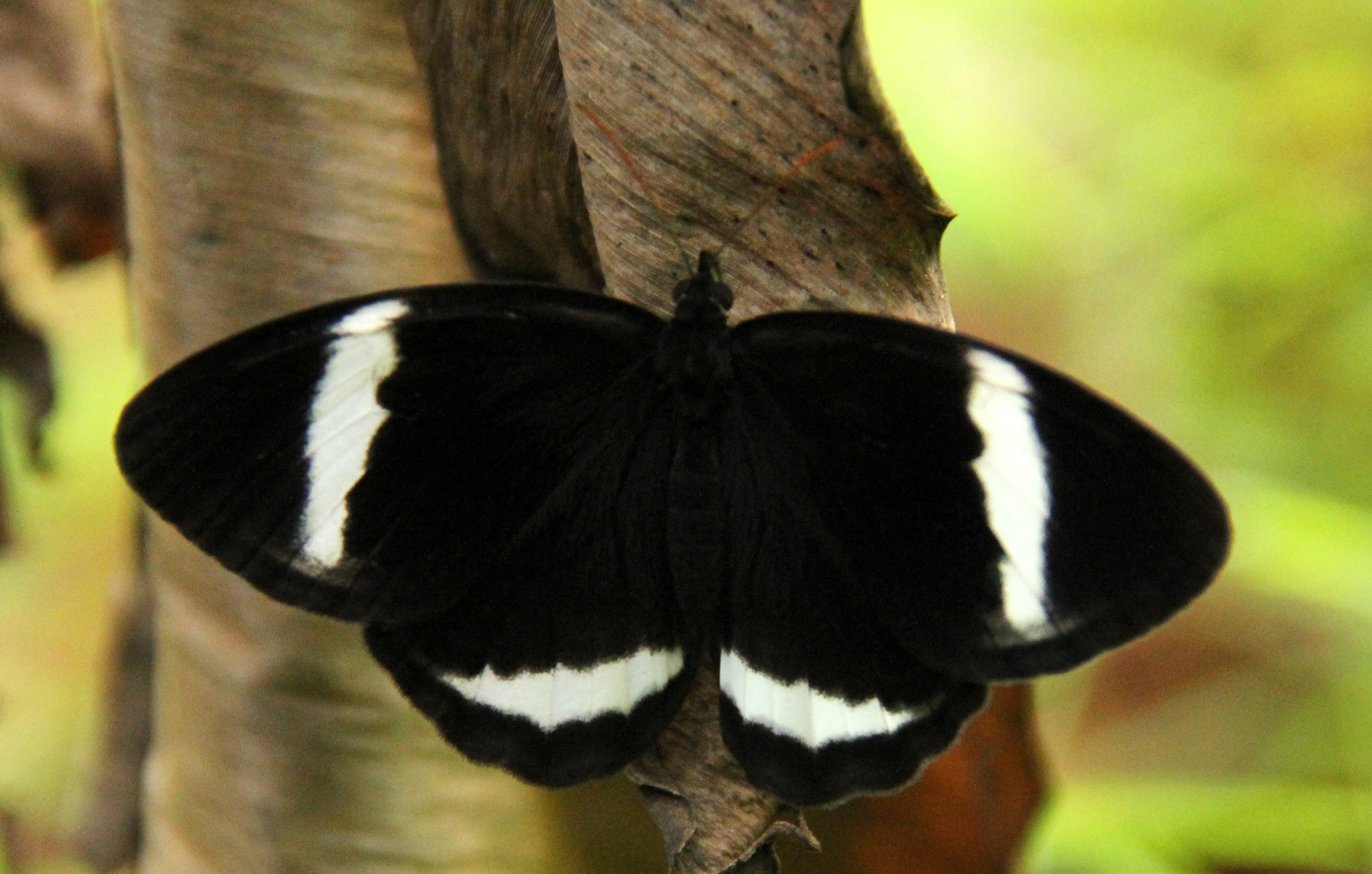
Dorsal view

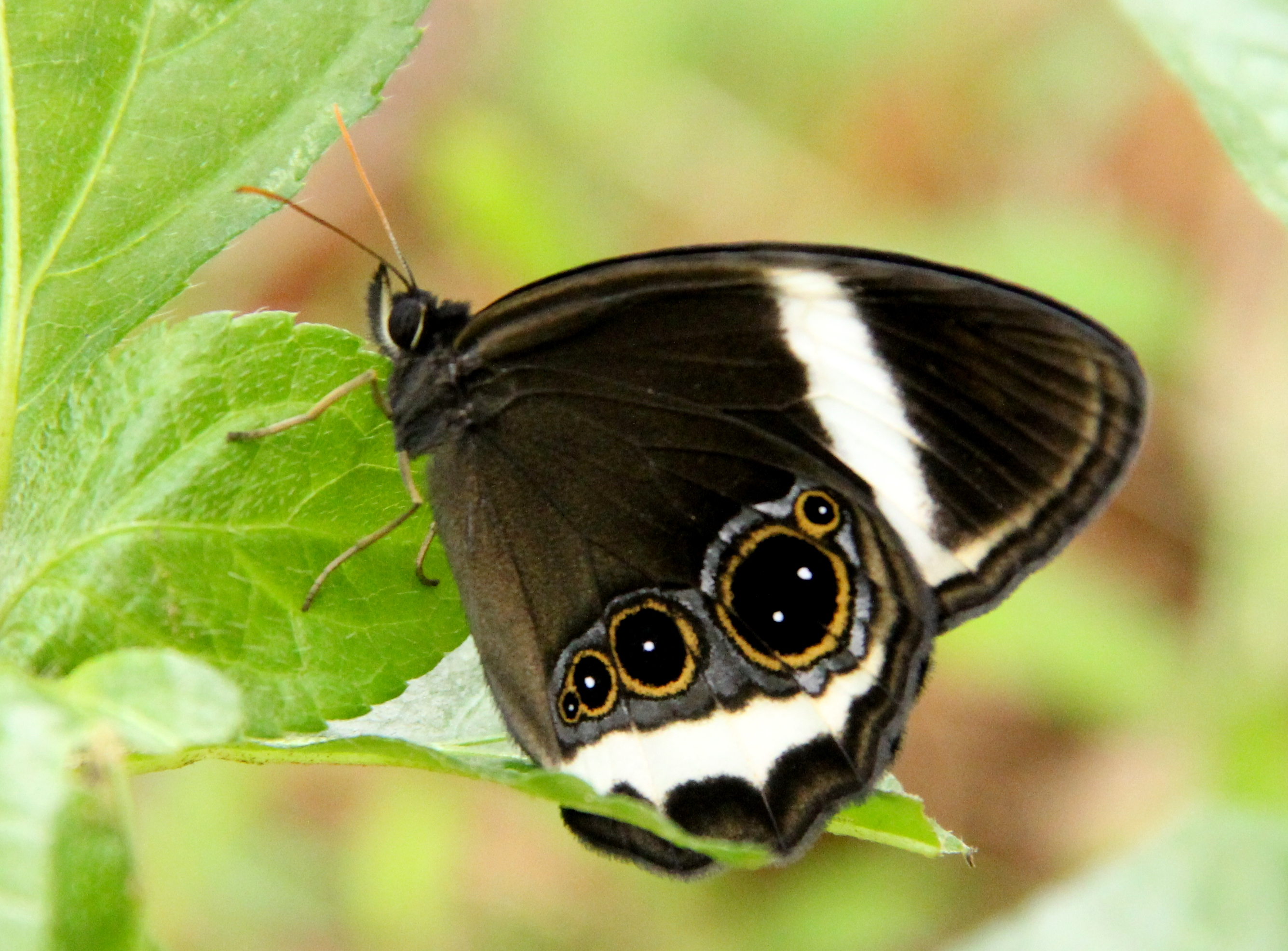
Ventral view

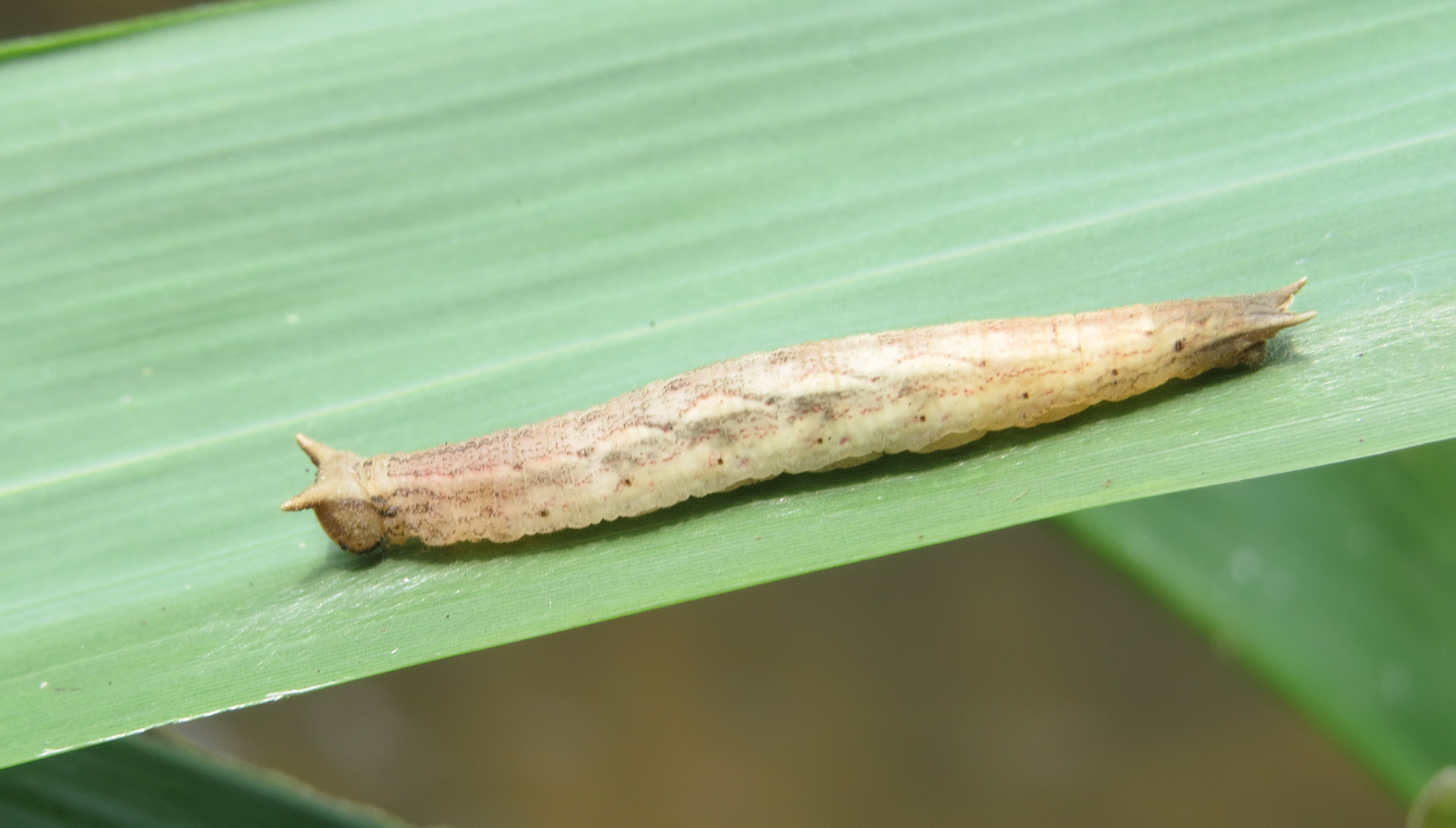
Larva

== Family: Riodinidae ==
=== Subfamily: Nemeobiinae ===
==== Genus: Abisara (Judies) ====
===== Abisara bifasciata (double-banded Judy) =====
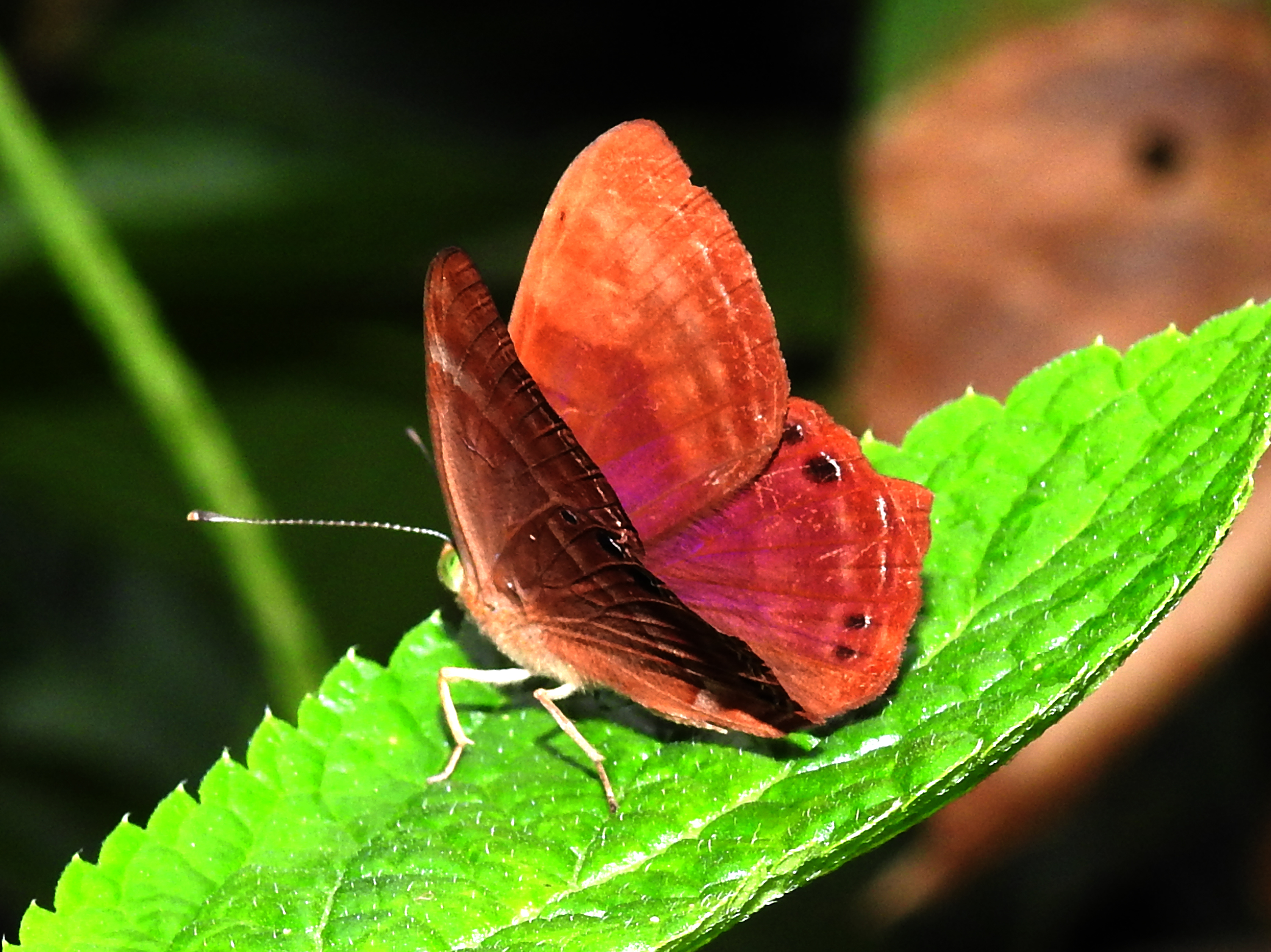
Dorsal view

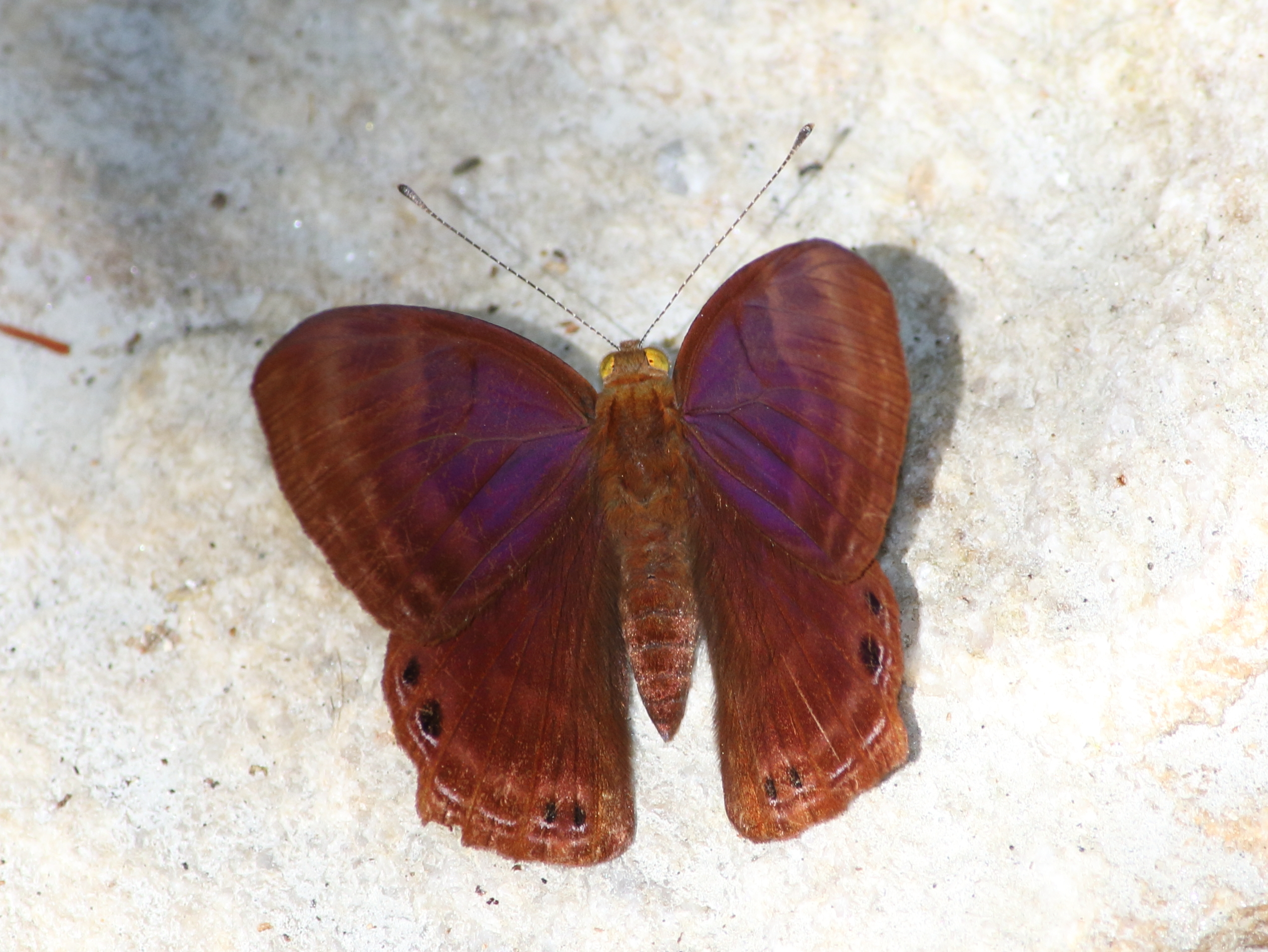
Dorsal view

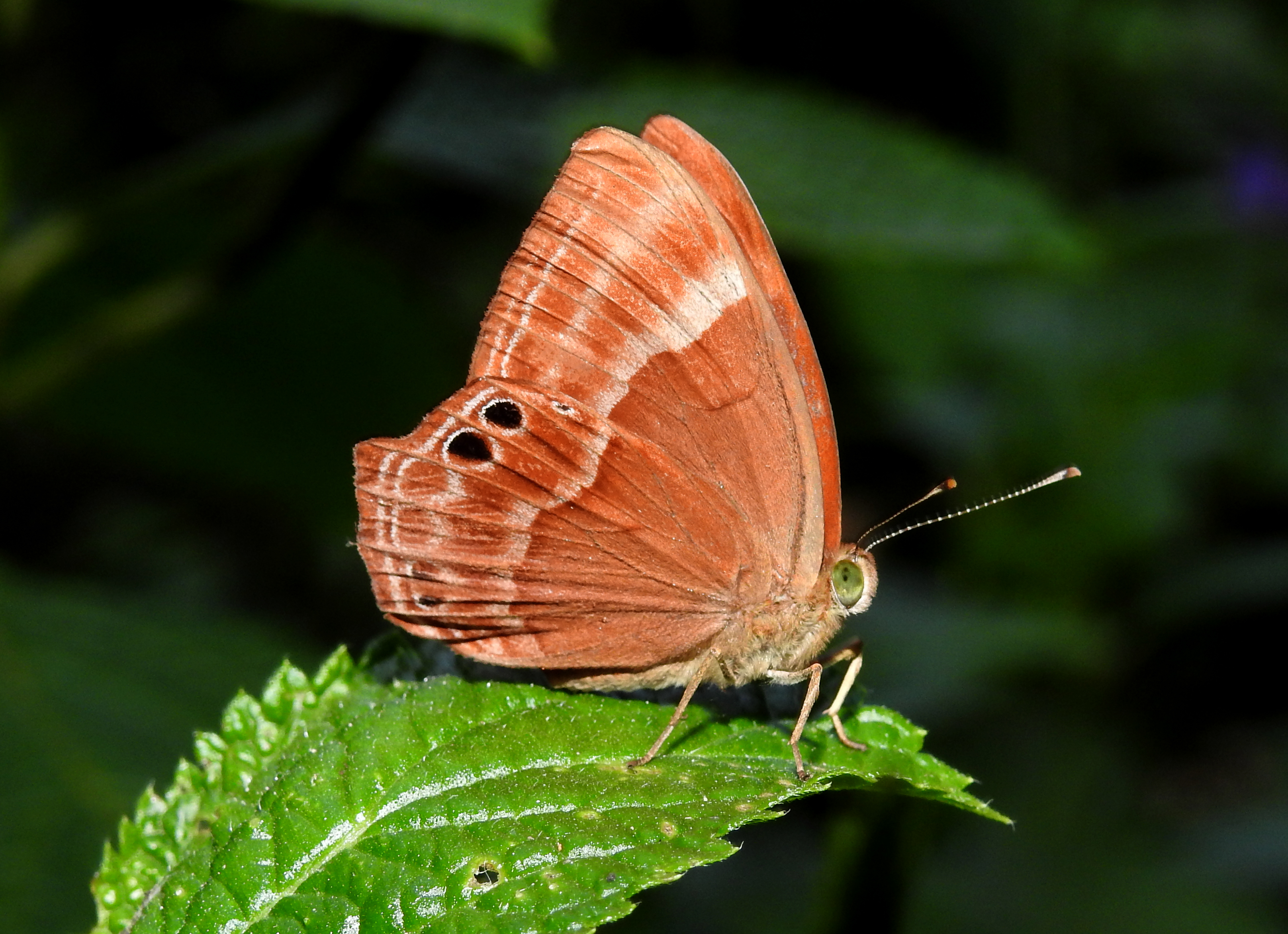
Ventral view

===== Abisara echerius (plum Judy) =====
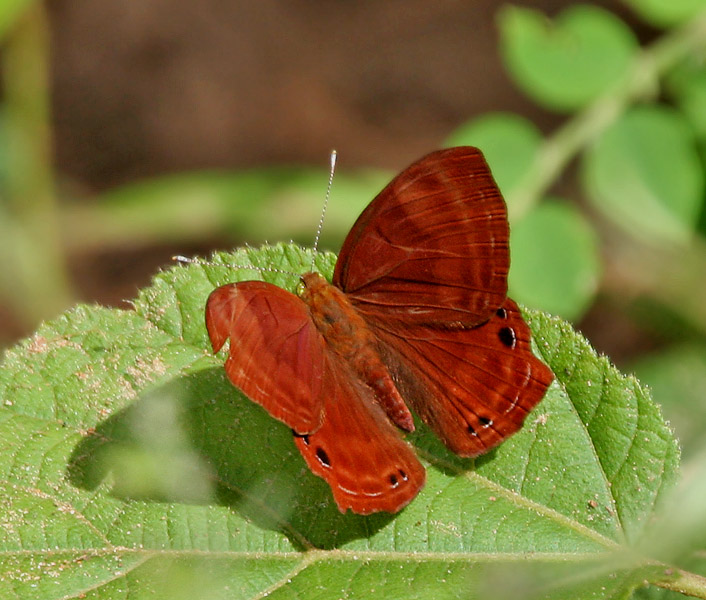
Dorsal view

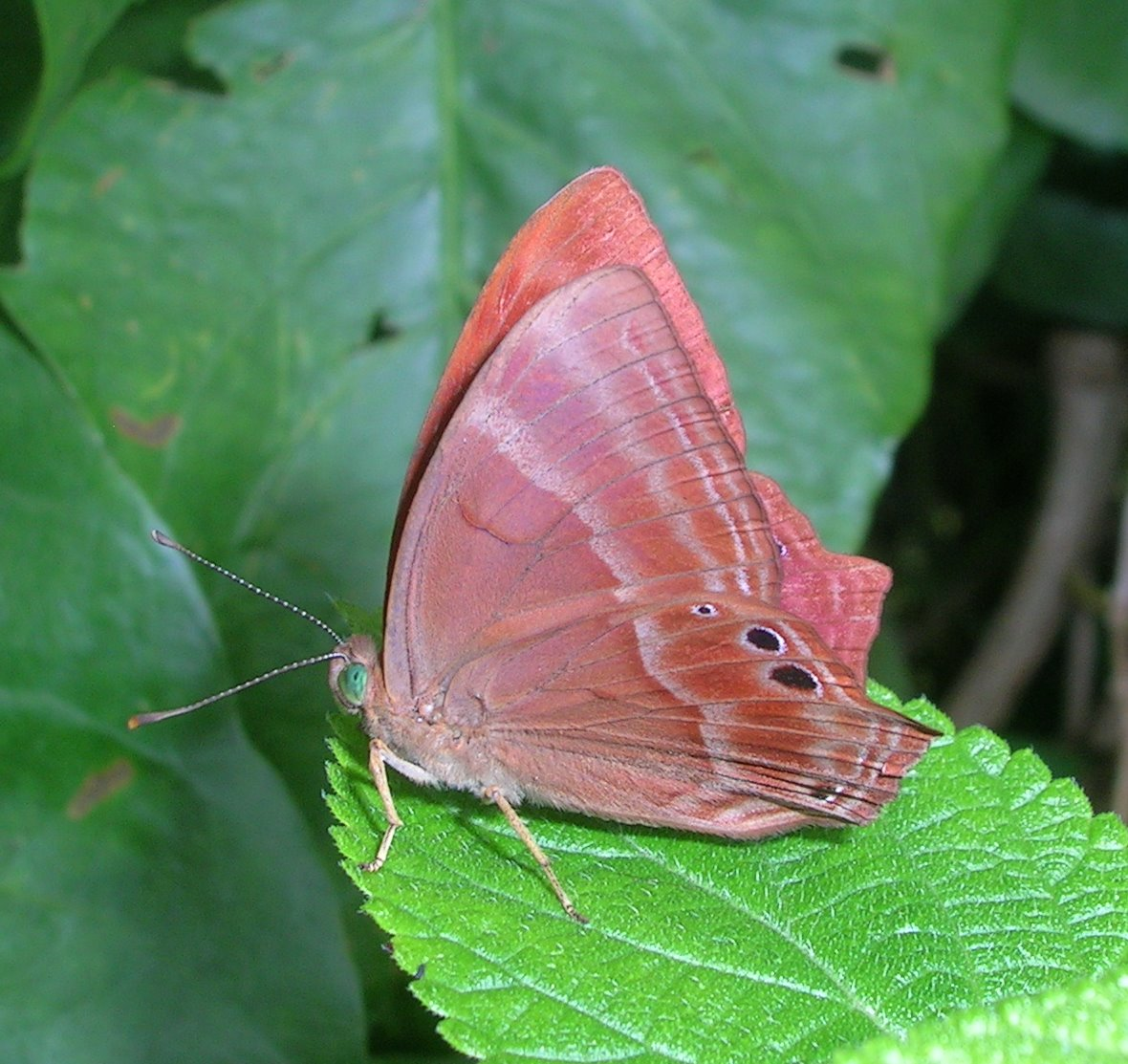
Ventral view

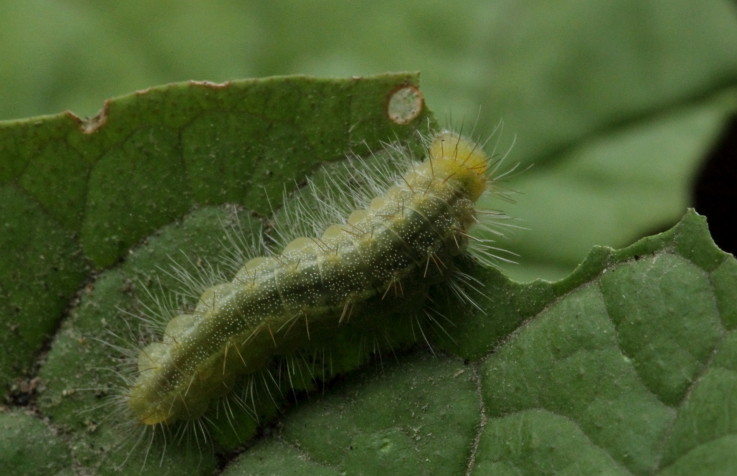
Larva

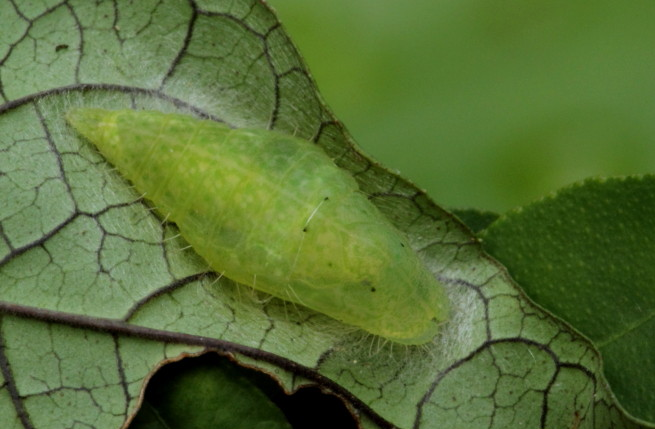
Pupa

== Family: Lycaenidae ==
=== Subfamily: Curetinae ===
==== Genus: Curetis (sunbeams) ====
===== Curetis acuta (angled sunbeam) =====
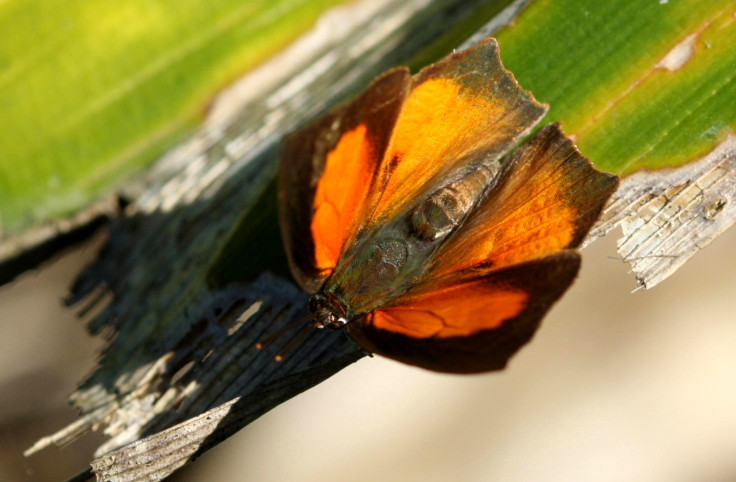
Dorsal view (male)

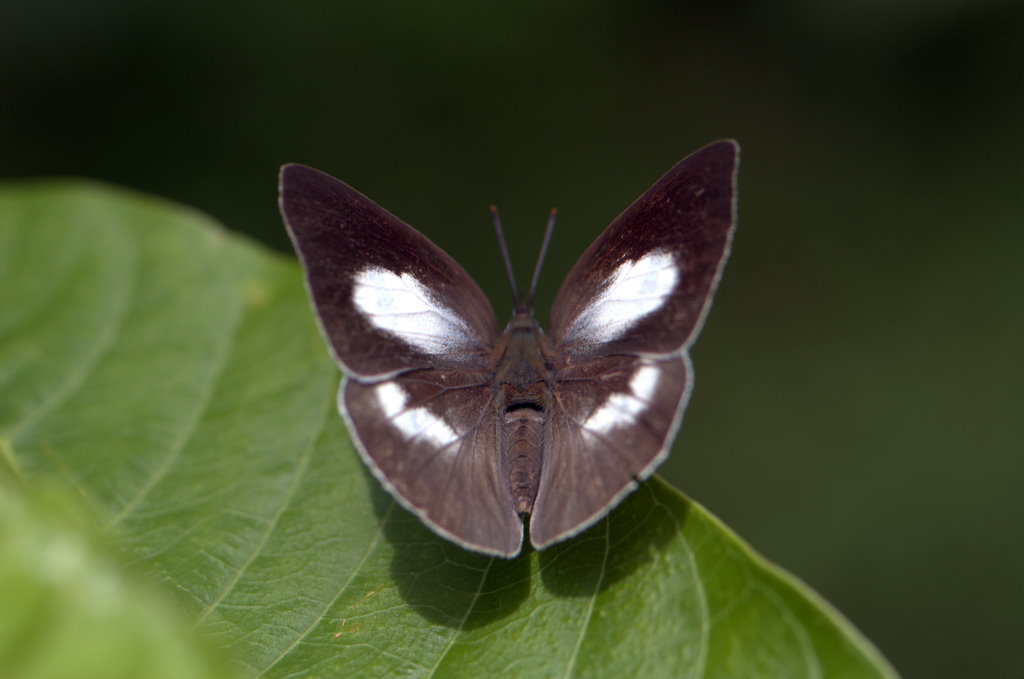
Dorsal view (female)

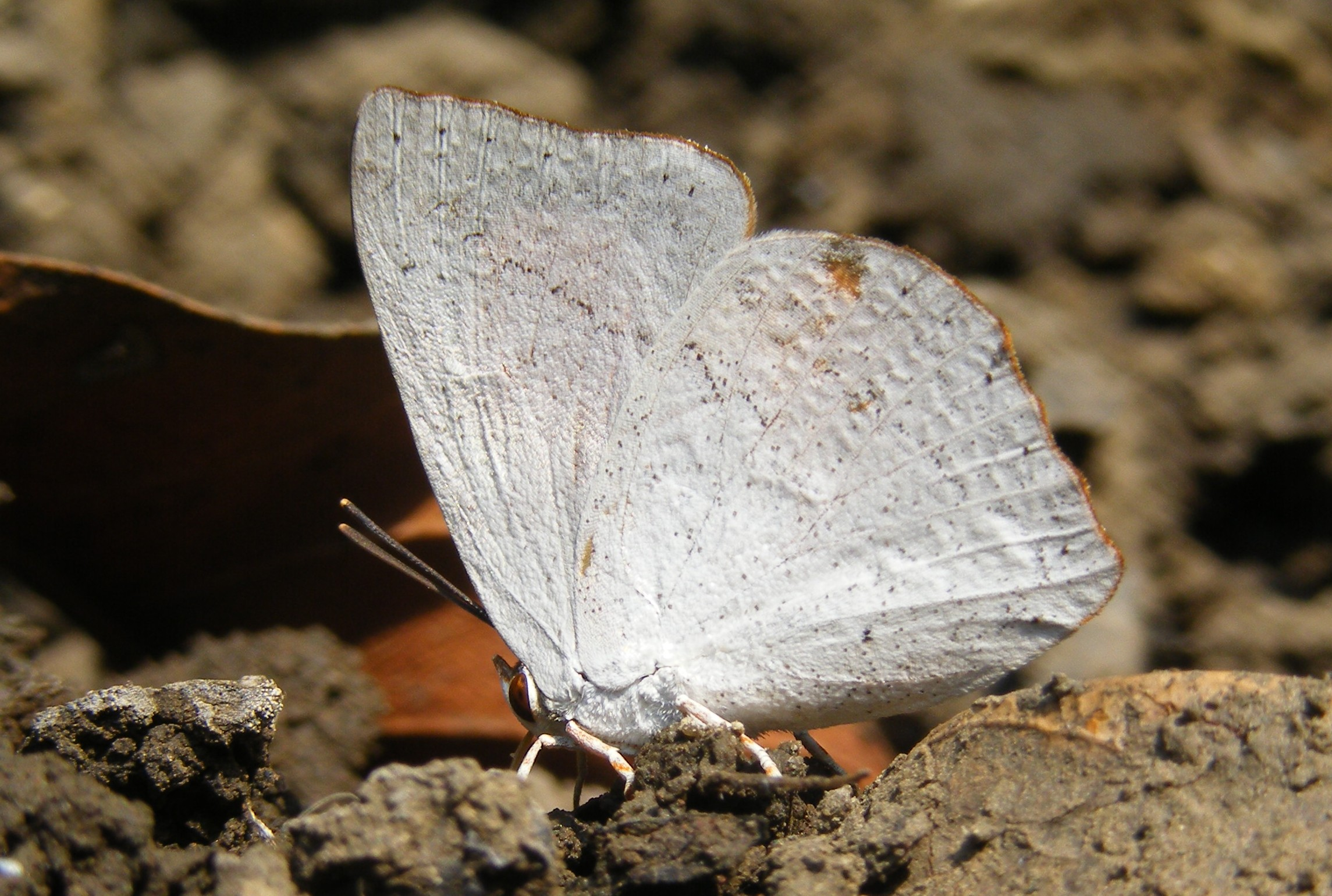
Ventral view

===== Curetis siva (Shiva sunbeam) =====
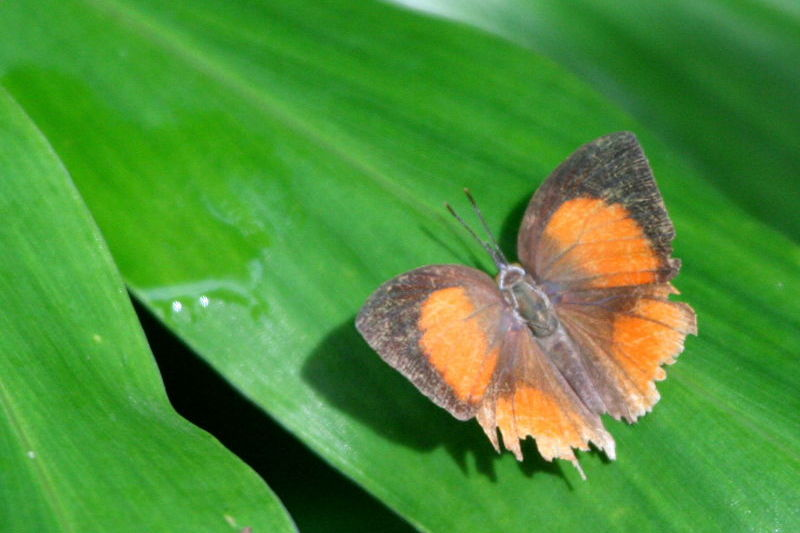
Dorsal view (male)

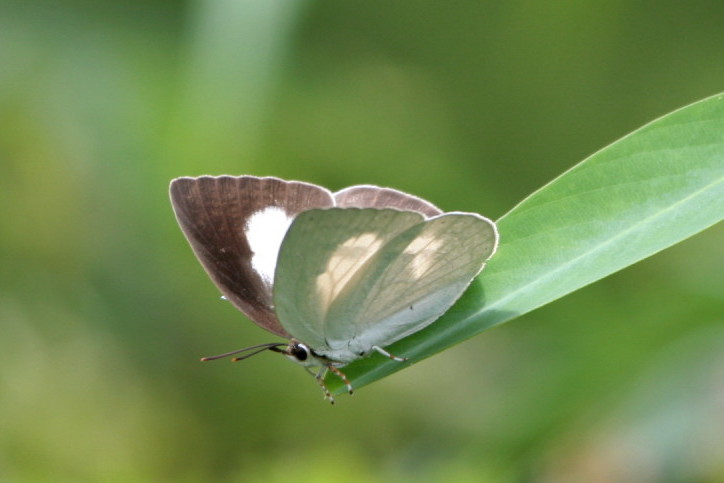
Dorsal view (female)

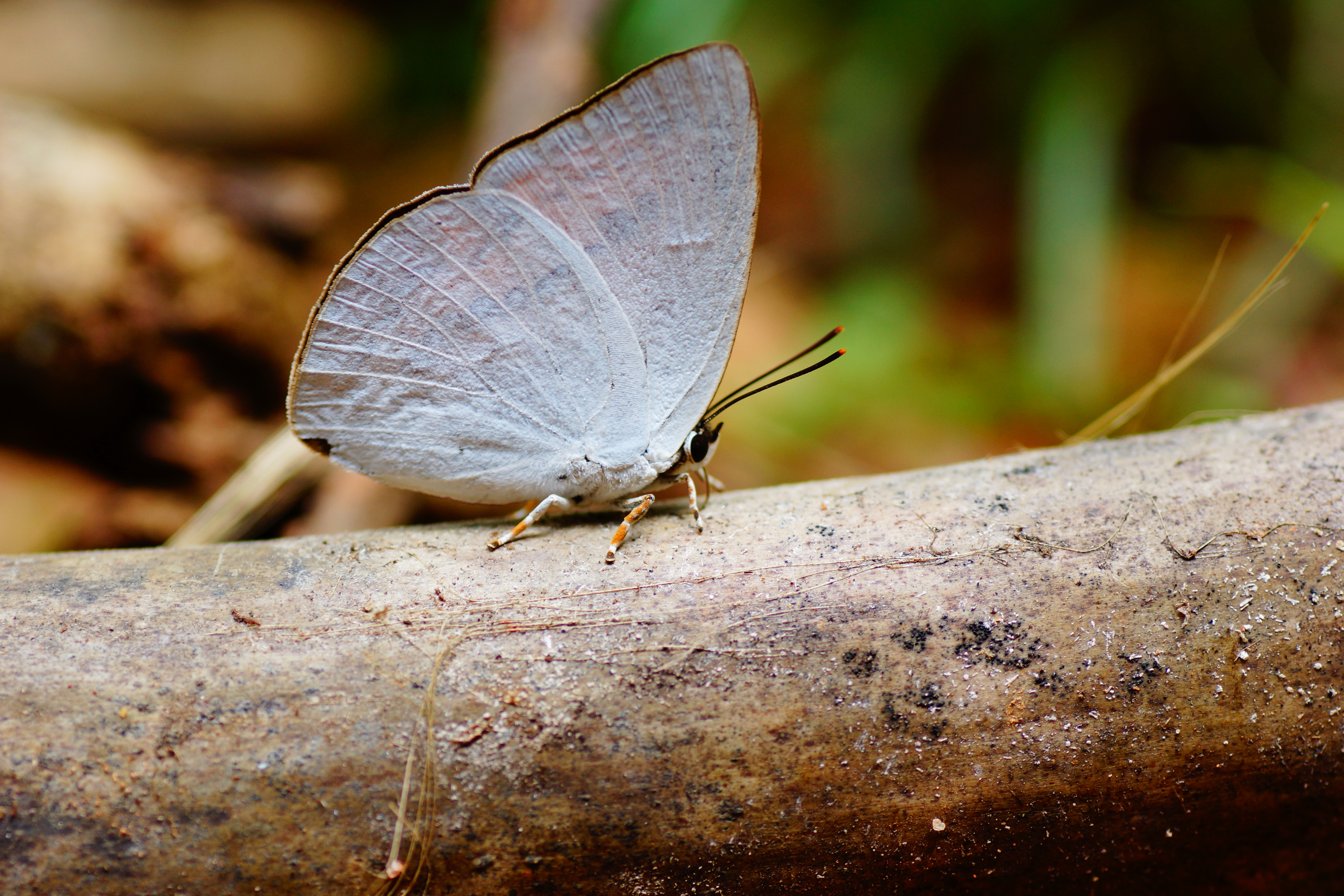
Ventral view

===== Curetis thetis (Indian sunbeam) =====
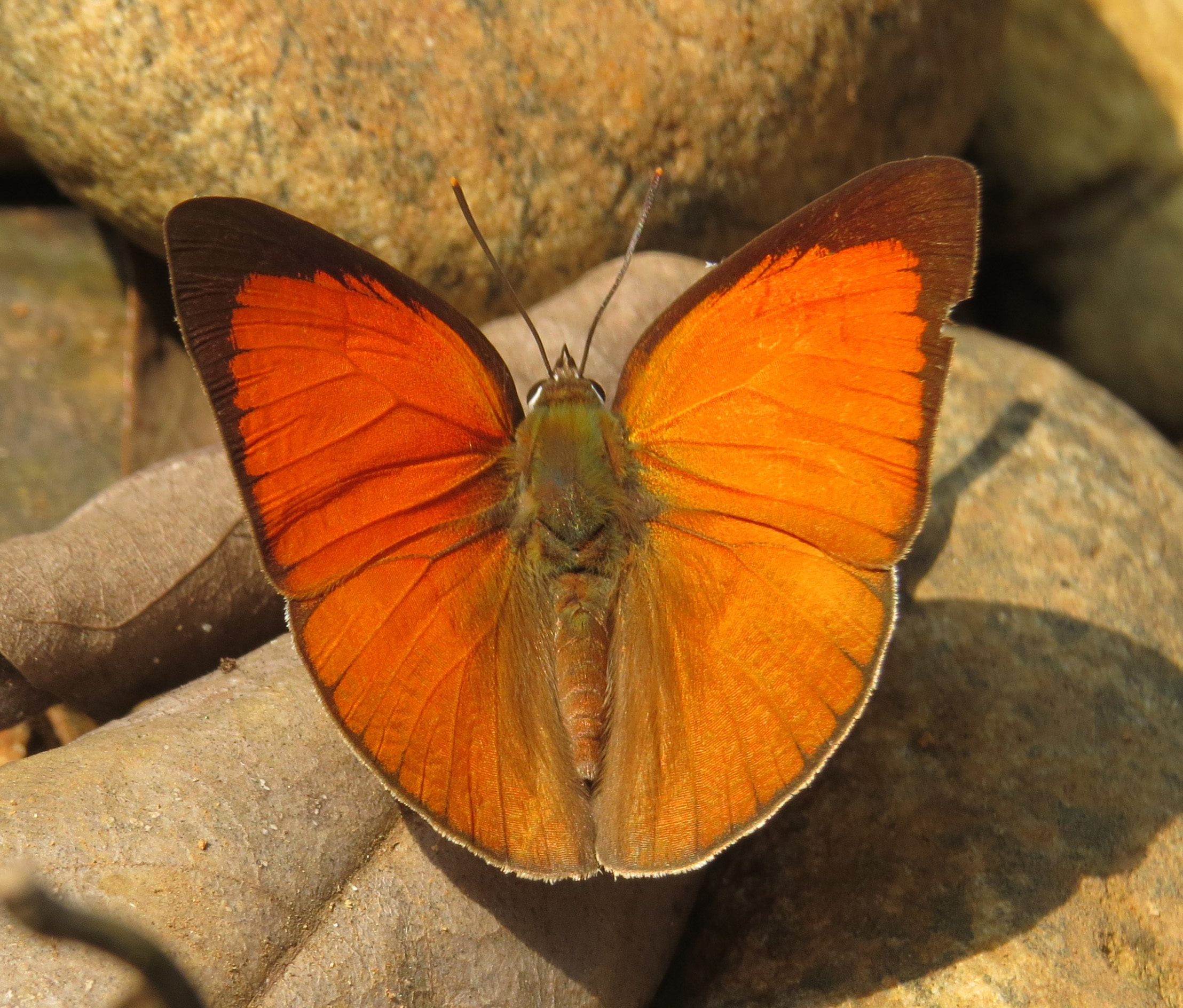
Dorsal view (male)

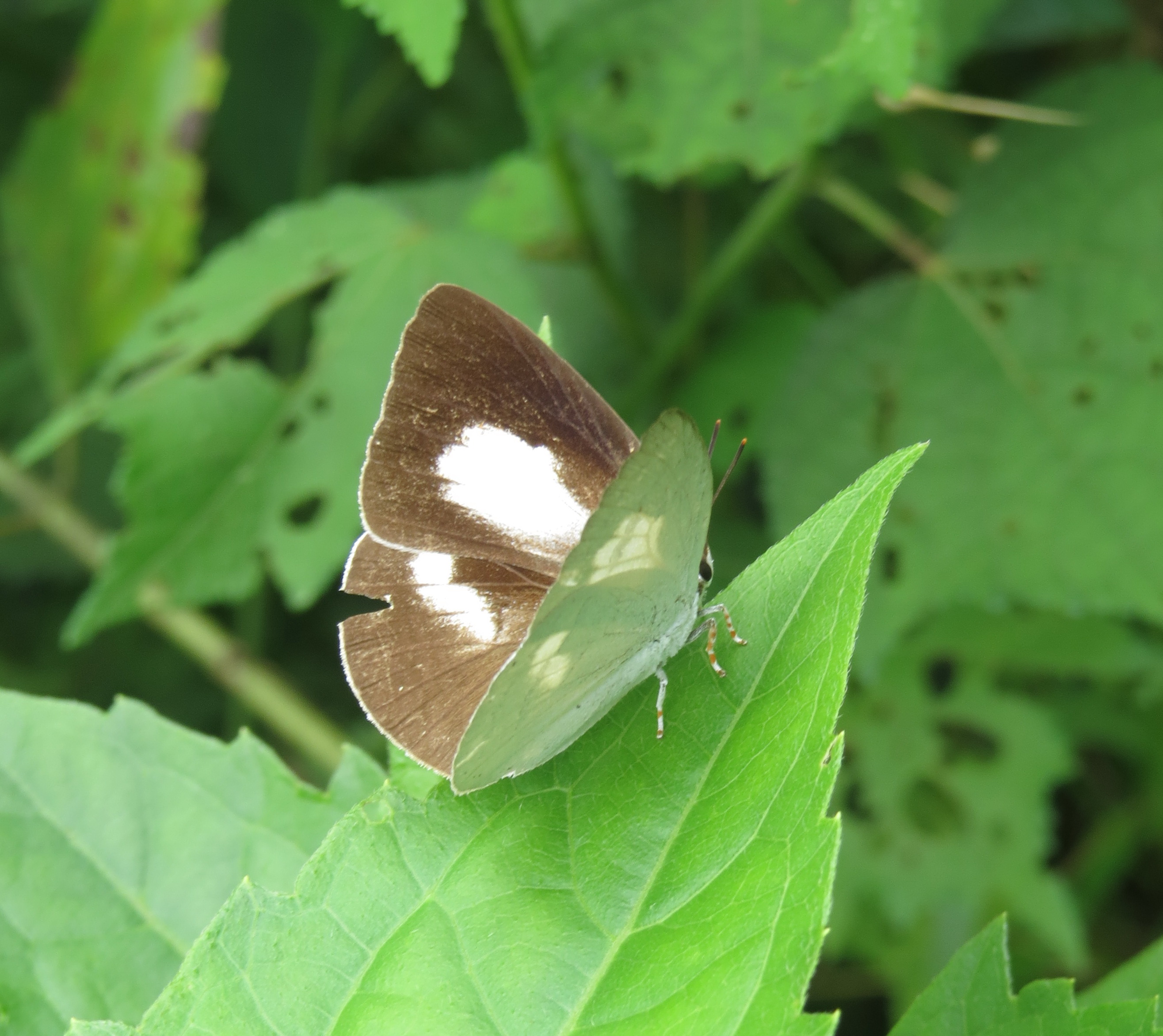
Dorsal view (female)

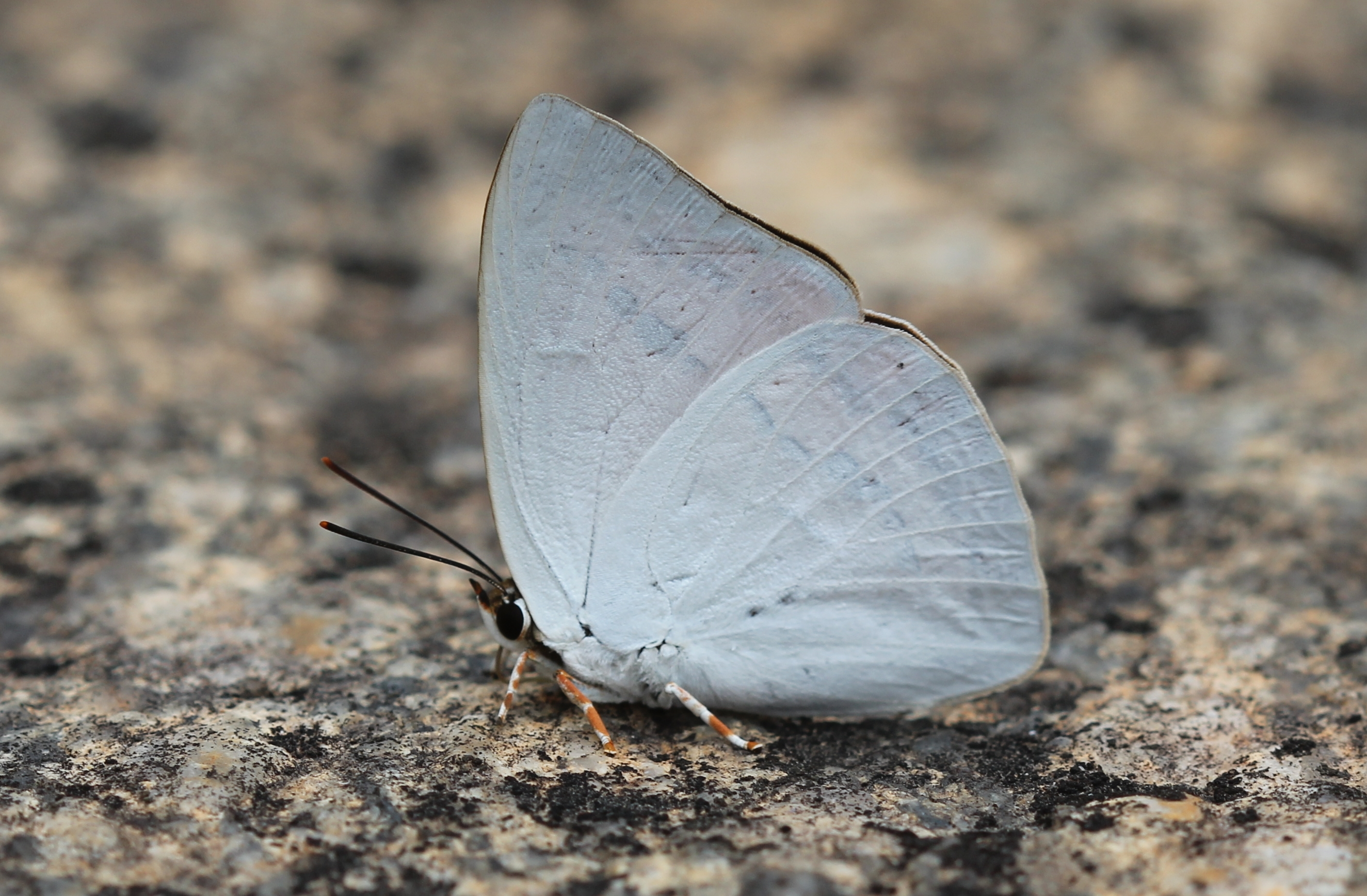
Ventral view

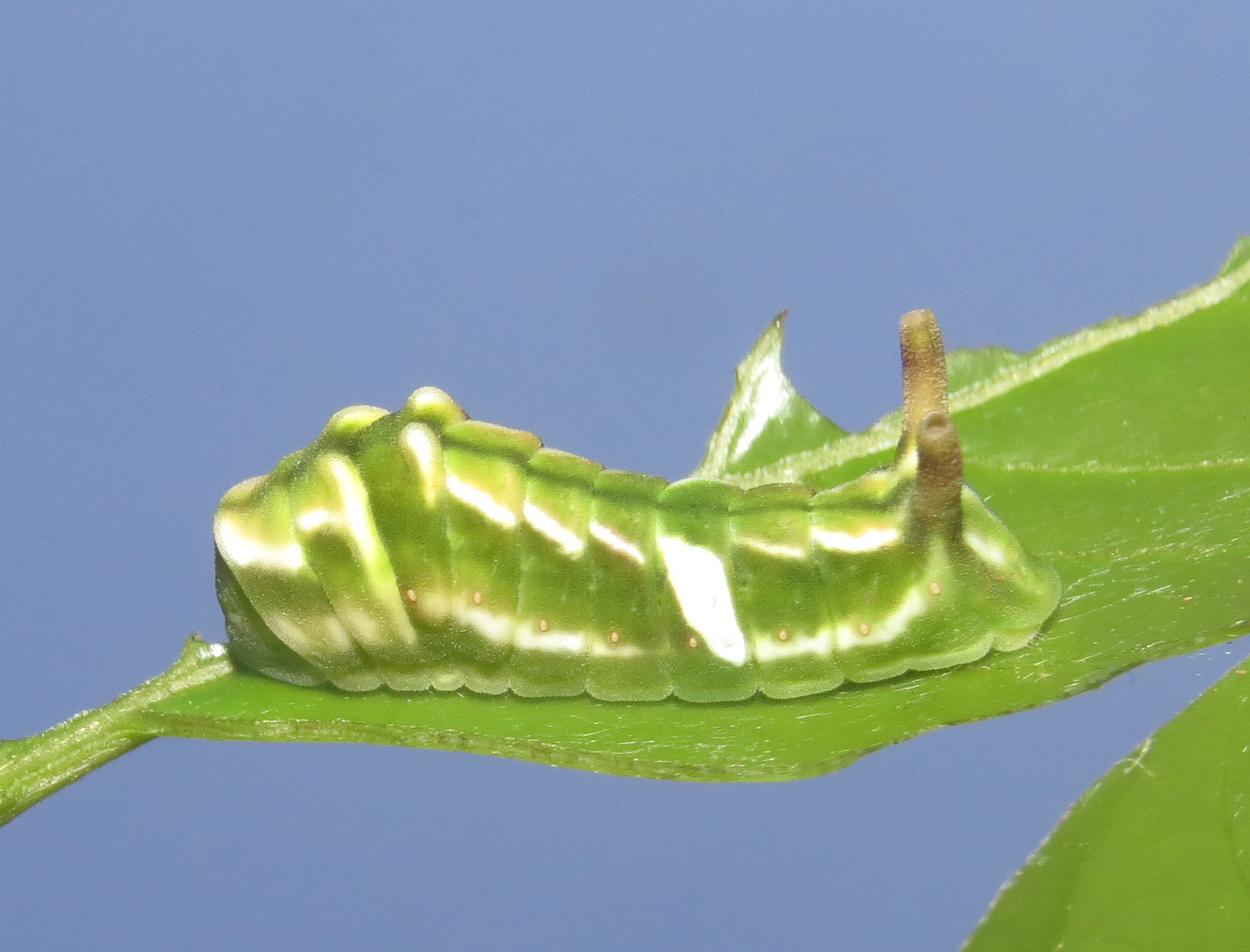
Larva

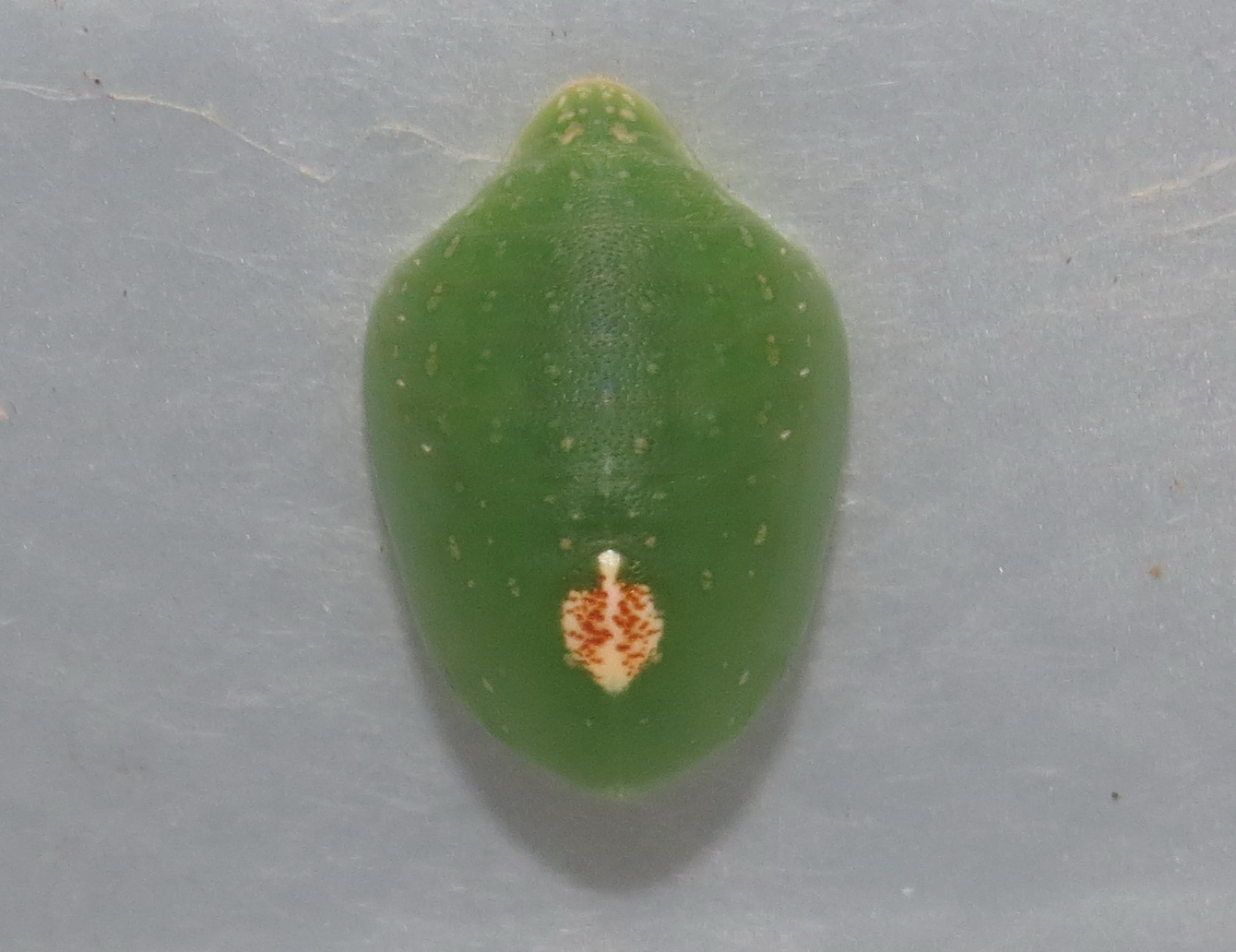
Pupa

=== Subfamily: Miletinae ===
==== Genus: Spalgis (apeflies) ====
===== Spalgis epius (apefly) =====
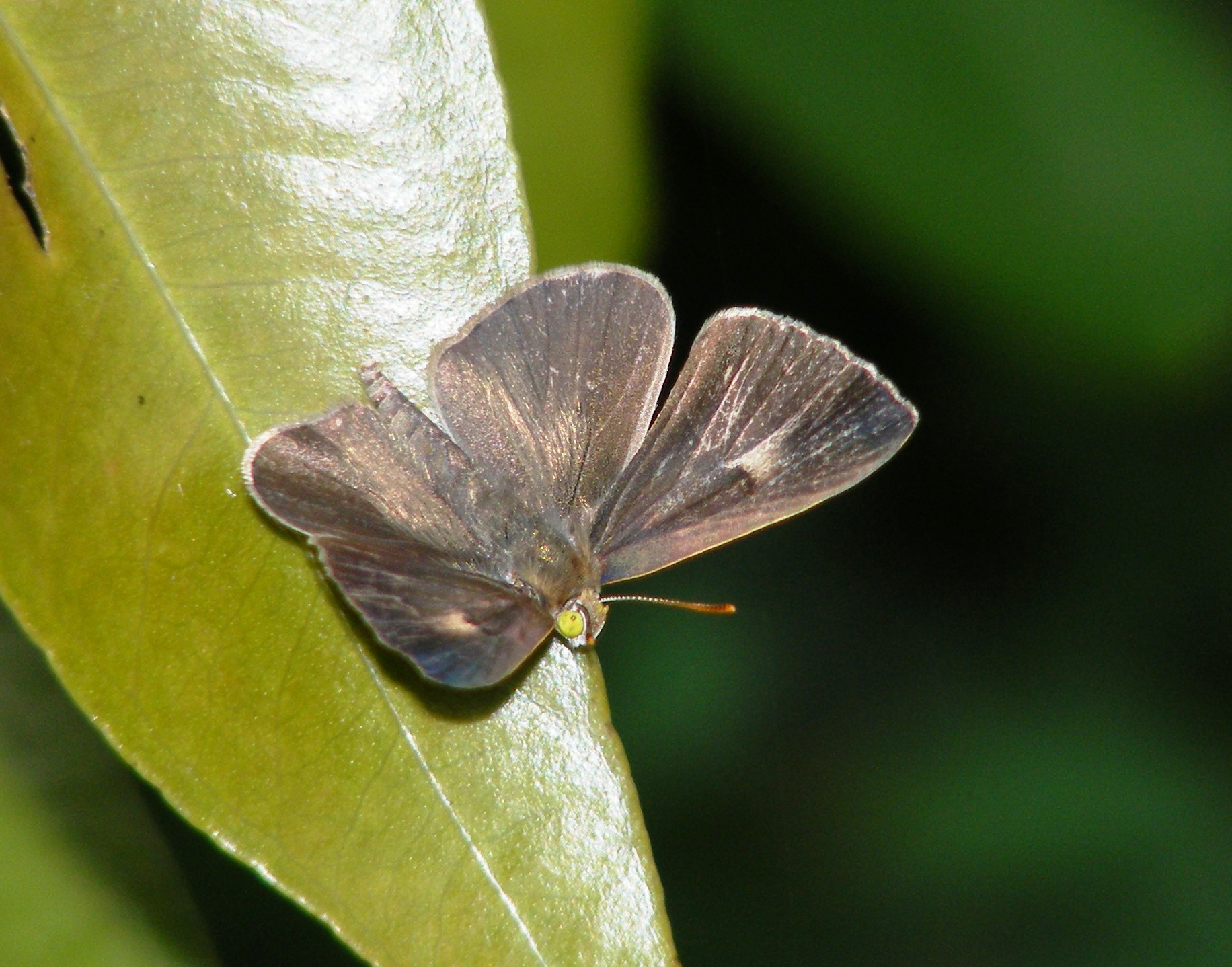
Dorsal view

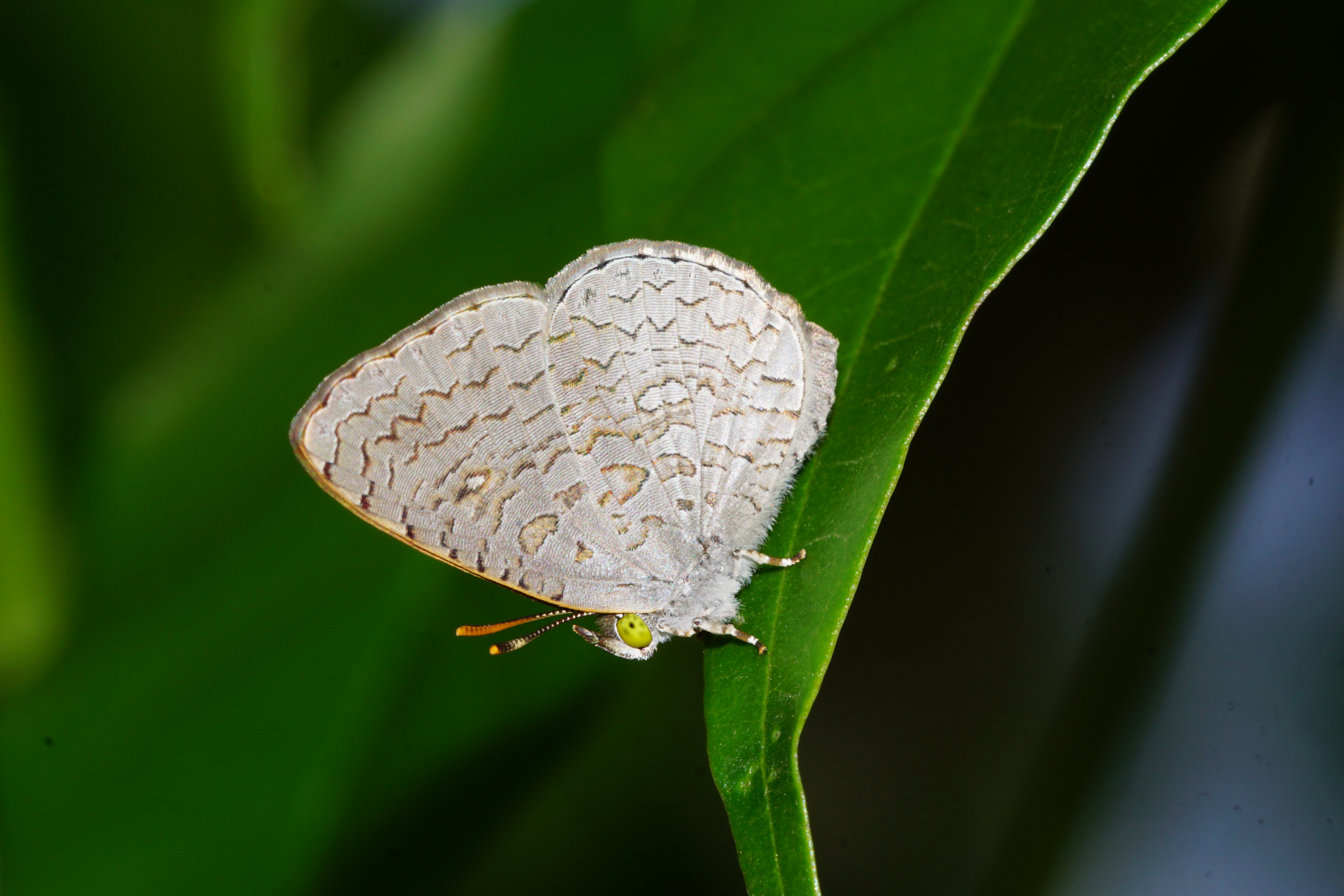
Ventral view

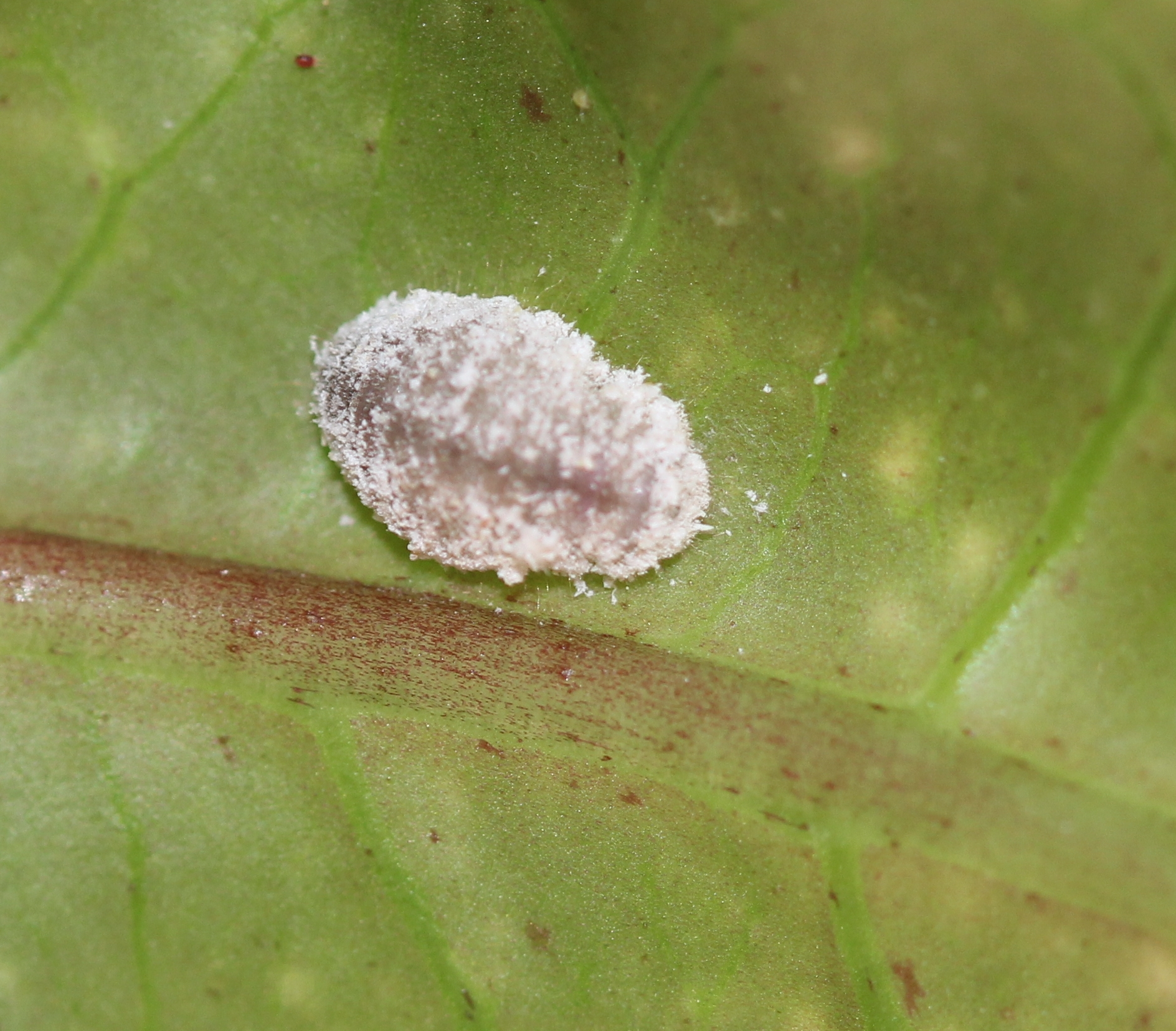
Larva

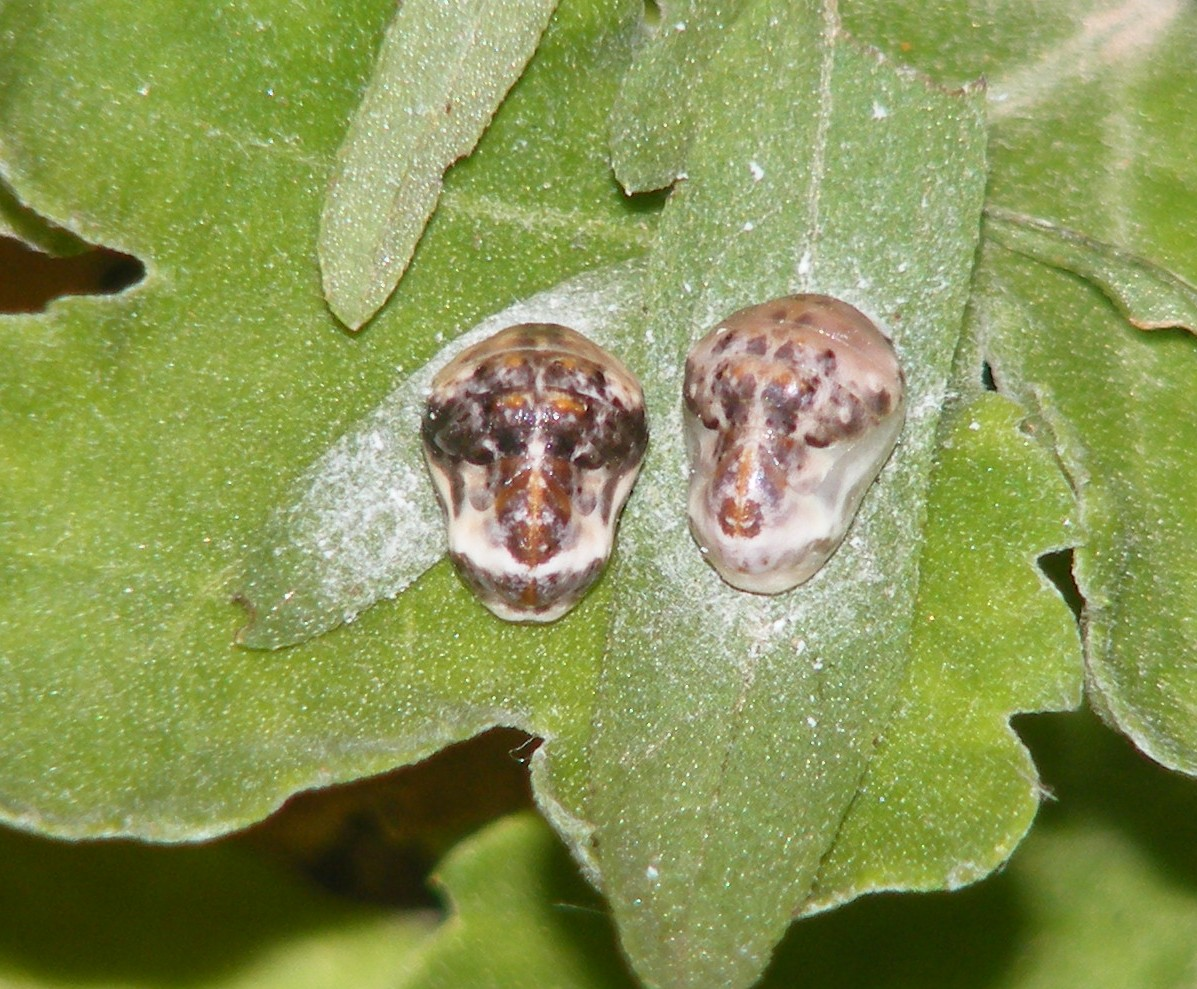
Pupa

=== Subfamily: Polyommatinae ===
==== Genus: Acytolepis (hedge blues) ====
===== Acytolepis lilacea (Hampson's hedge blue) =====
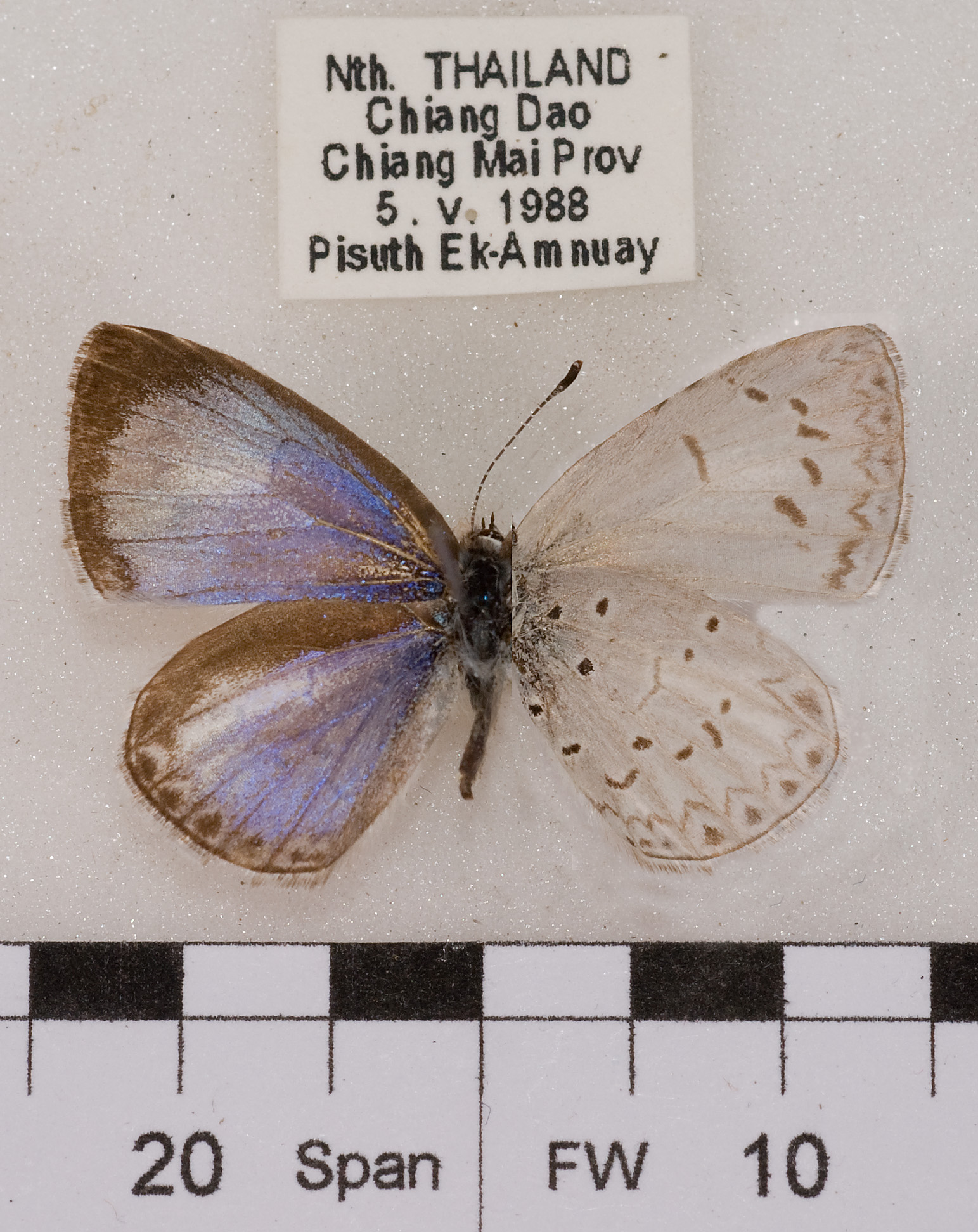
Museum specimen

===== Acytolepis puspa (common hedge blue) =====
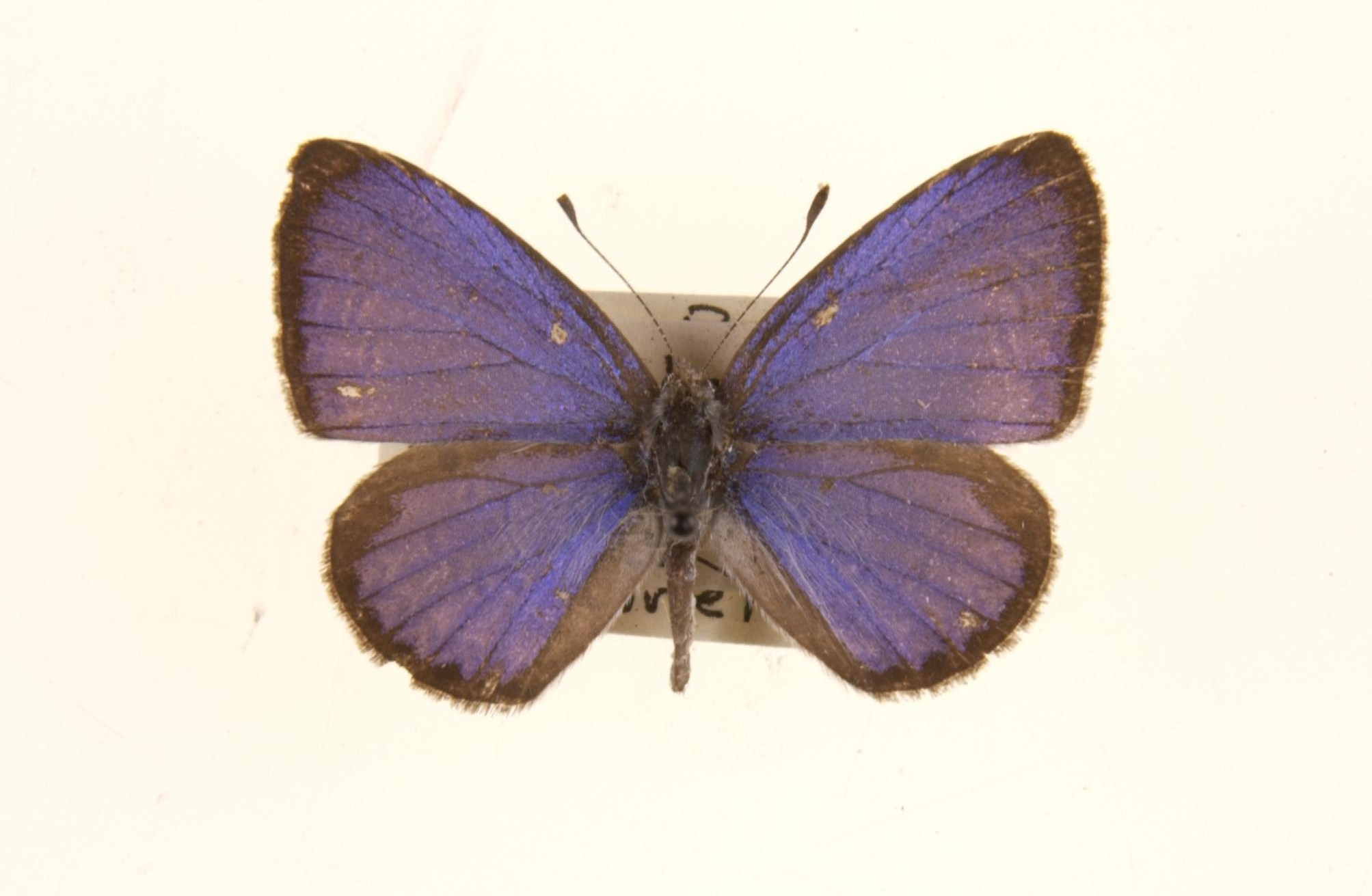
Dorsal view (male)

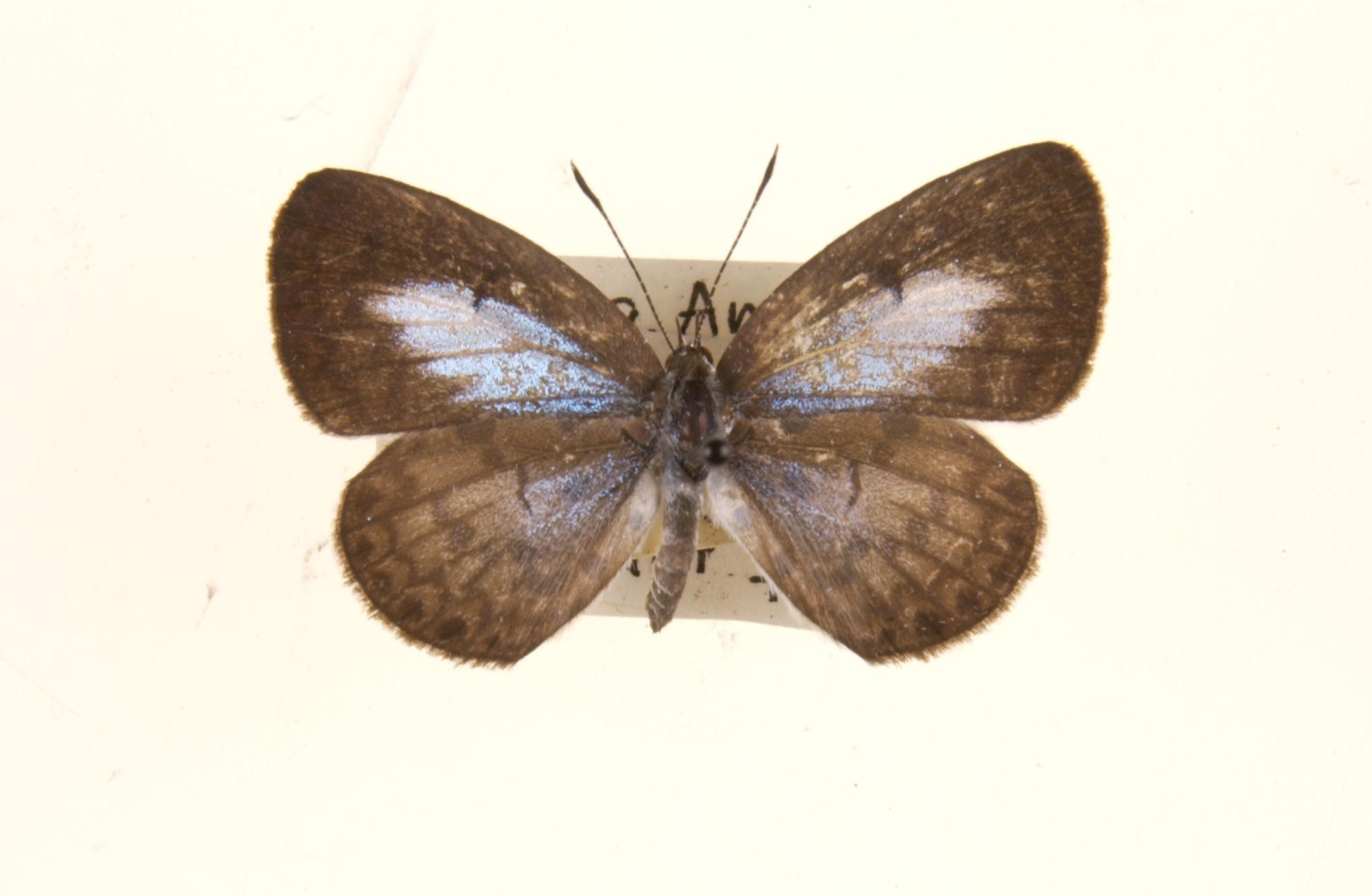
Dorsal view (female)

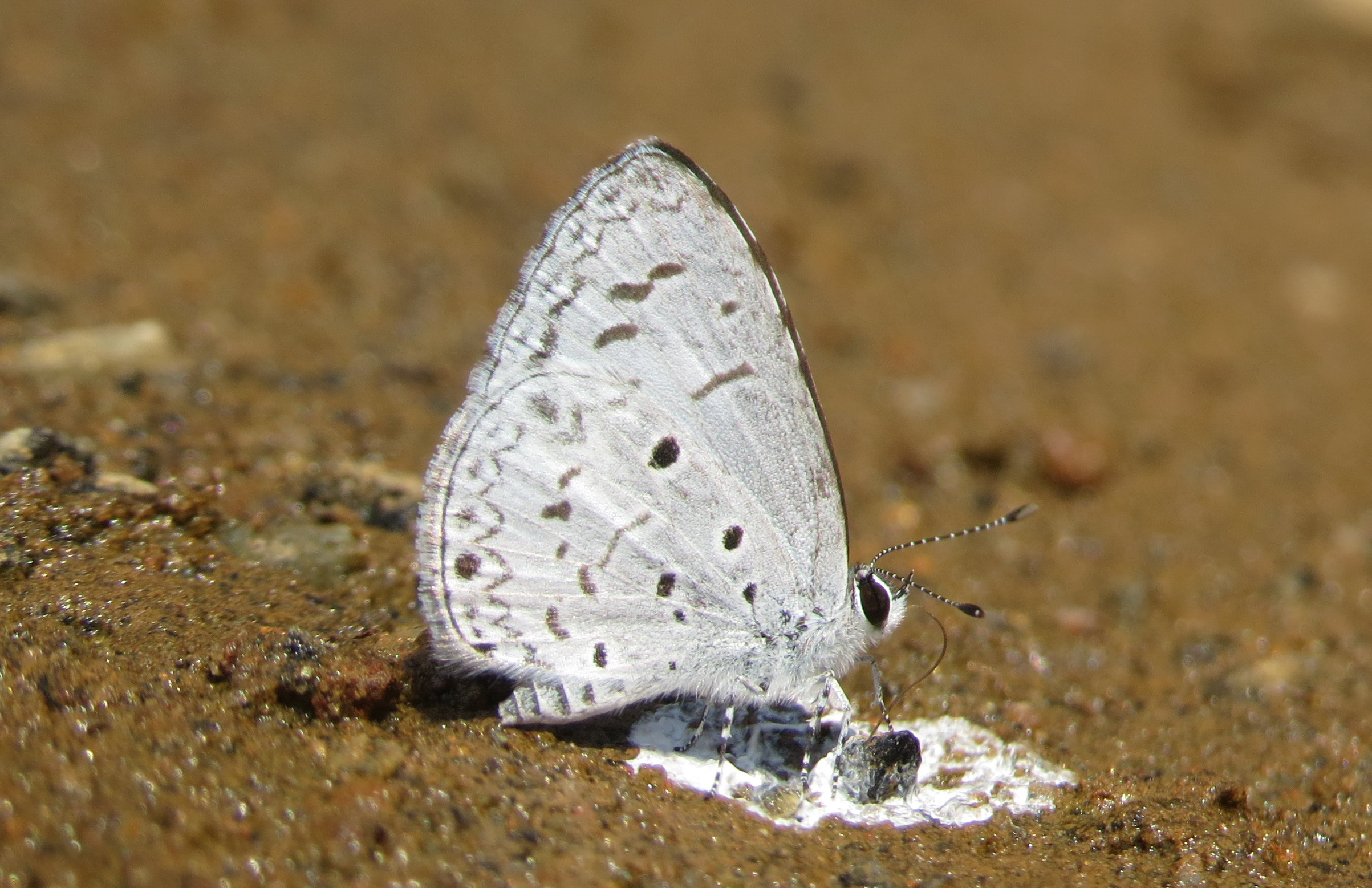
Ventral view

==== Genus: Anthene (ciliate blues) ====
===== Anthene emolus (ciliate blue) =====
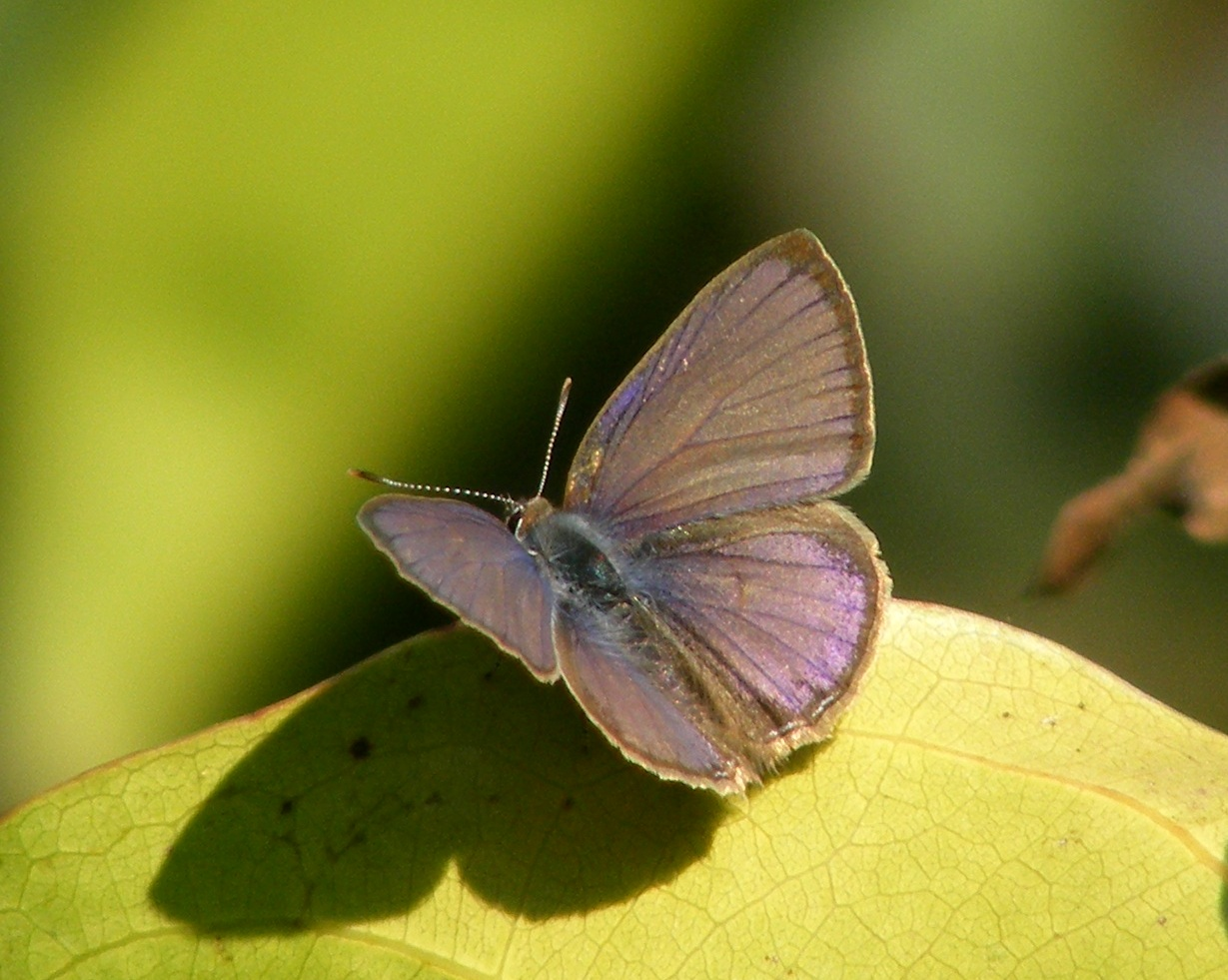
Dorsal view

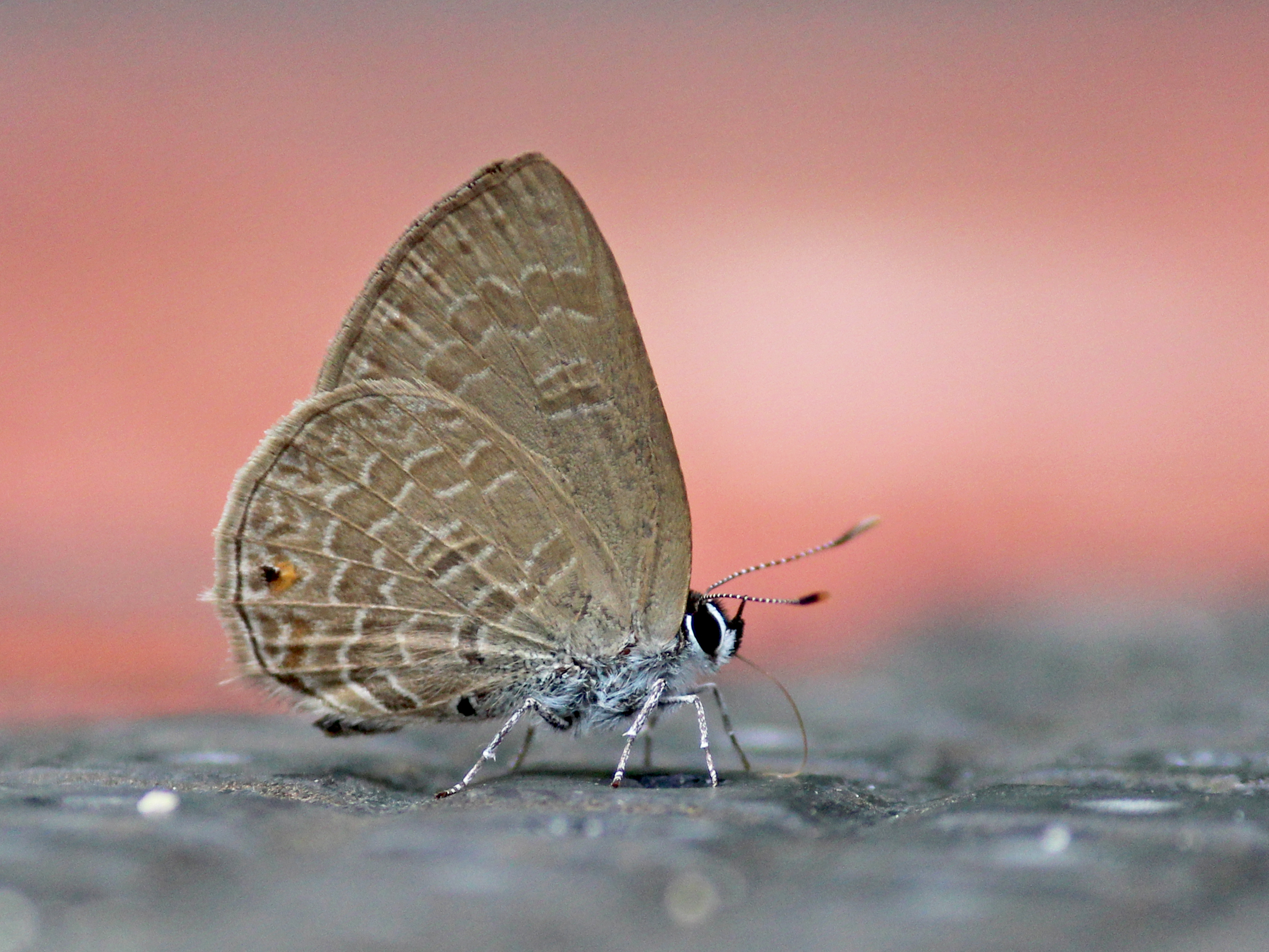
Ventral view

===== Anthene lycaenina (pointed ciliate blue) =====
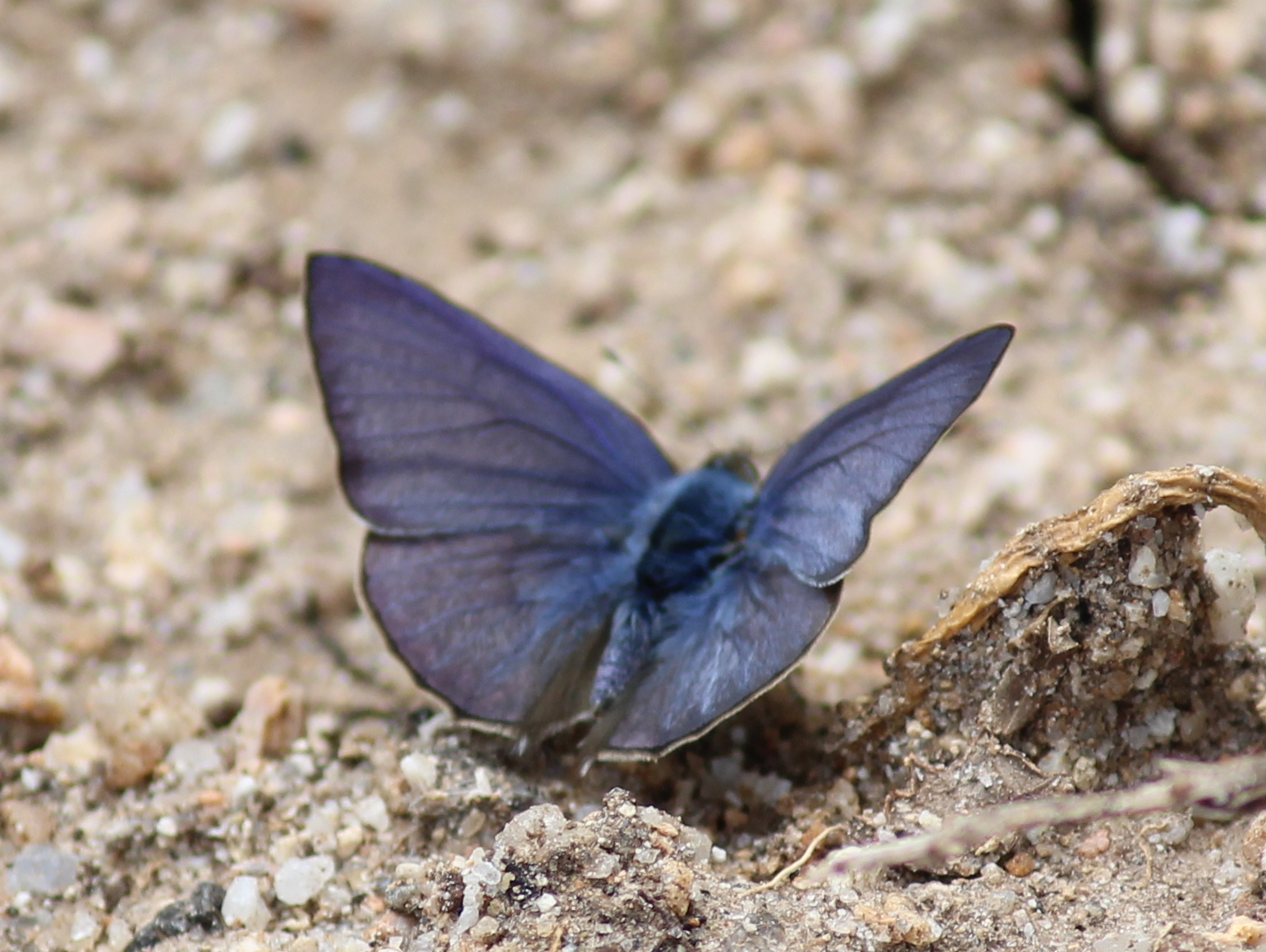
Dorsal view

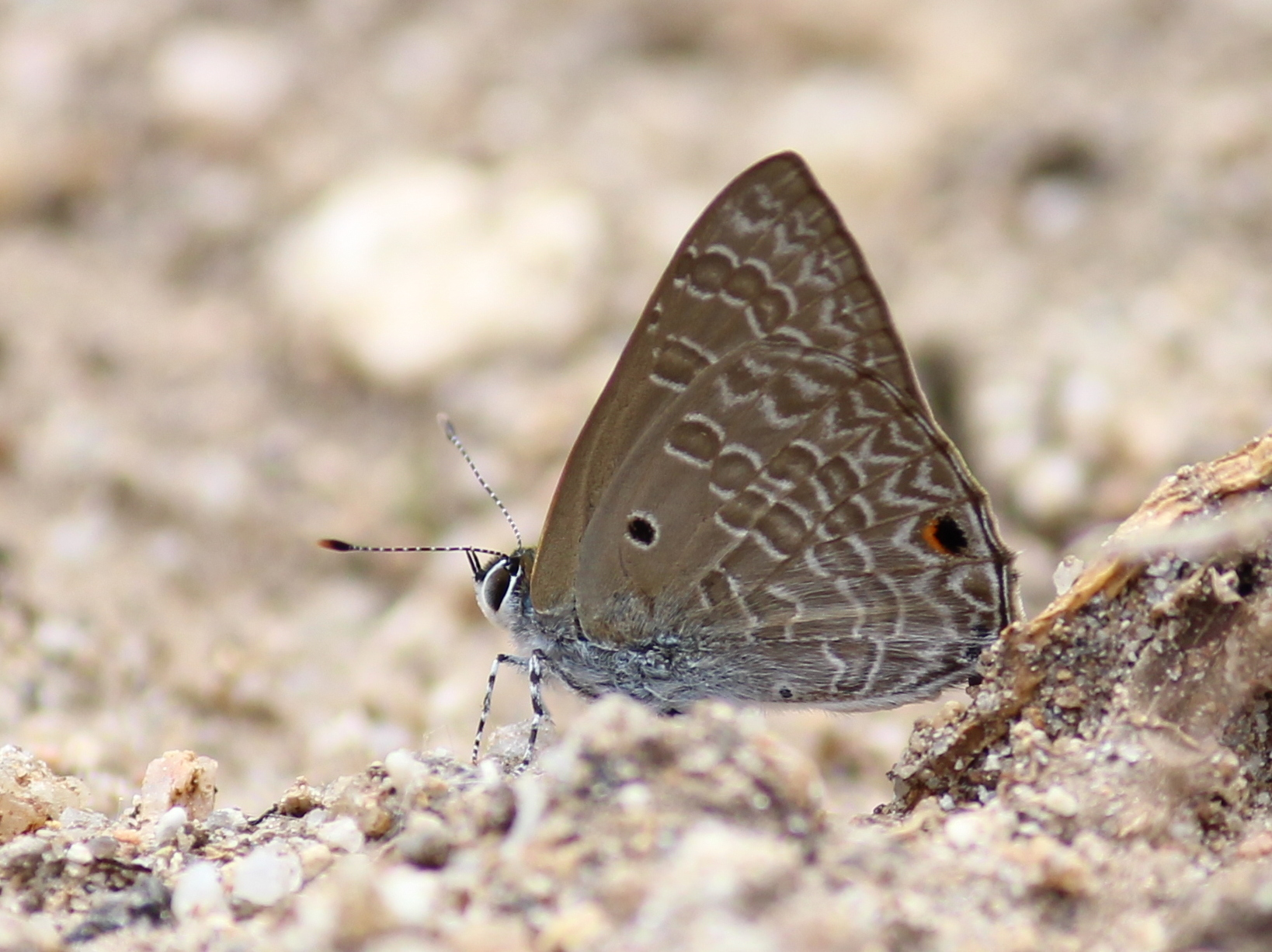
Ventral view

==== Genus: Azanus (babul blues) ====
===== Azanus jesous (African babul blue) =====
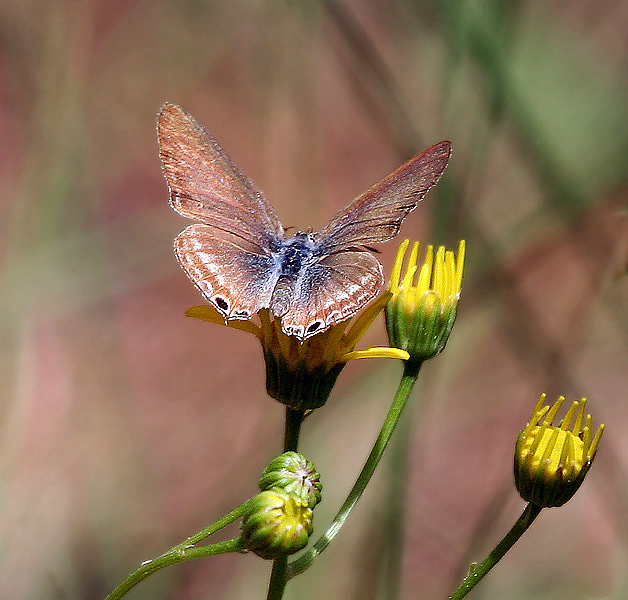
Dorsal view

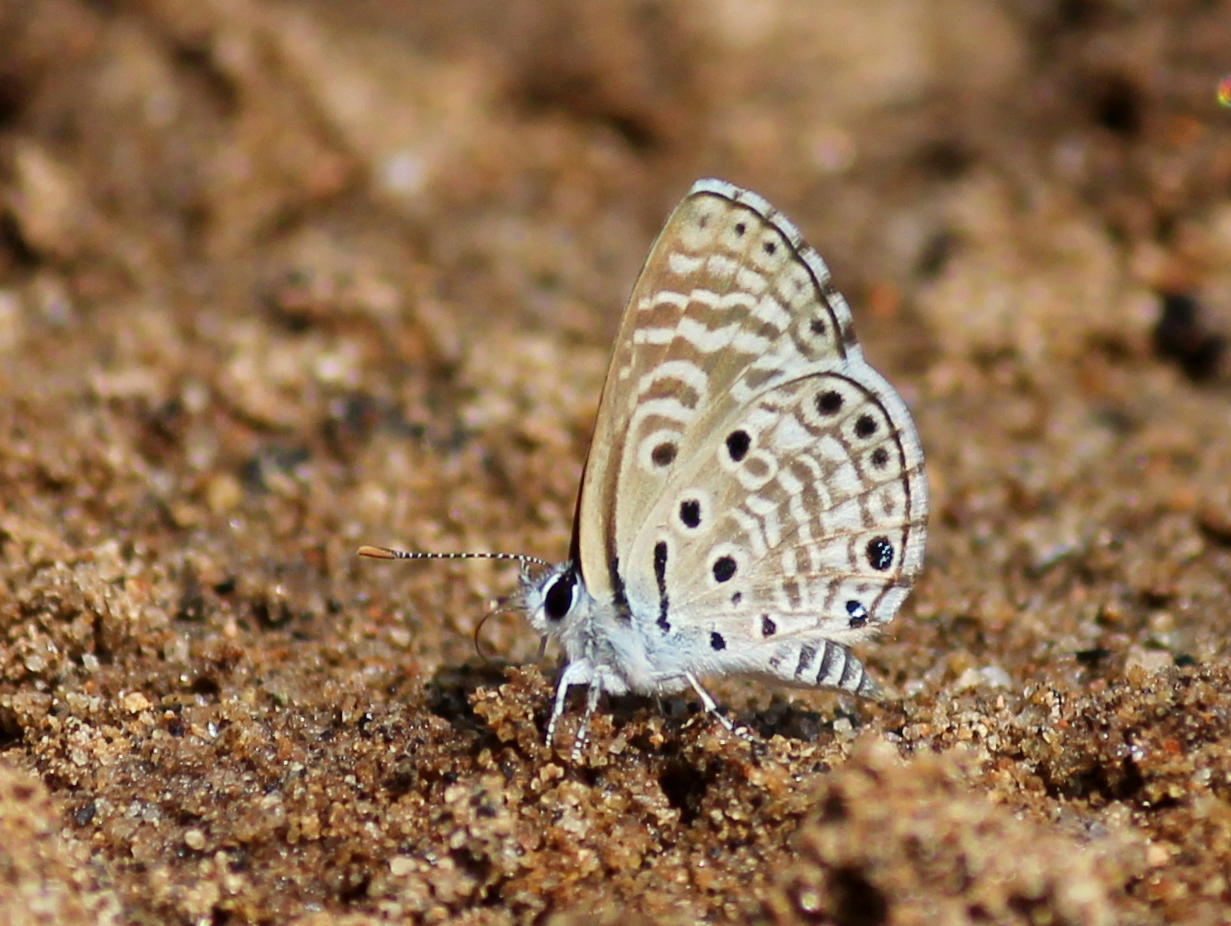
Ventral view

===== Azanus ubaldus (bright babul blue) =====
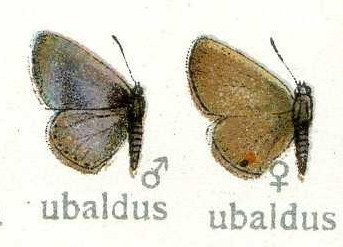
Dorsal view

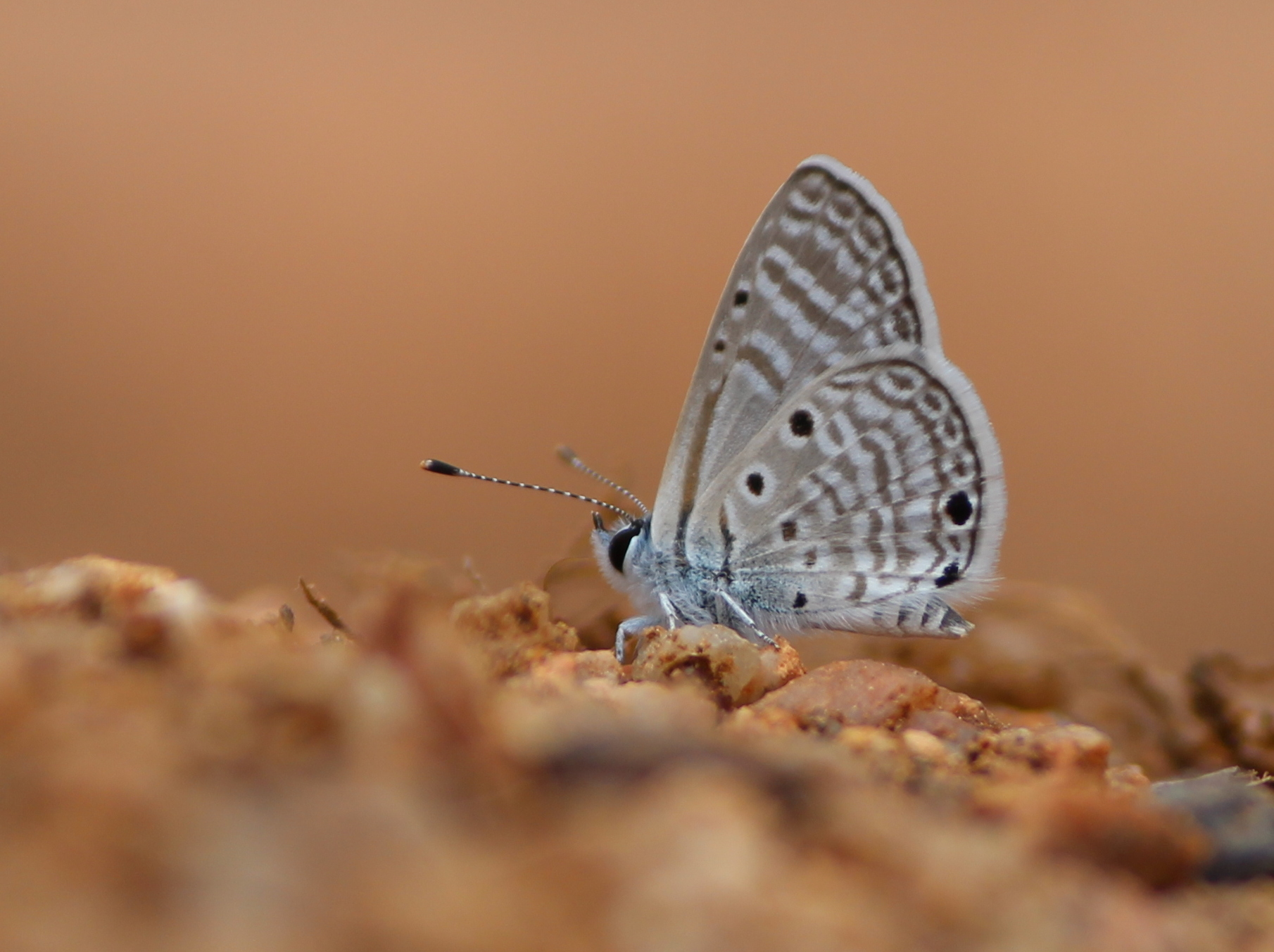
Ventral view

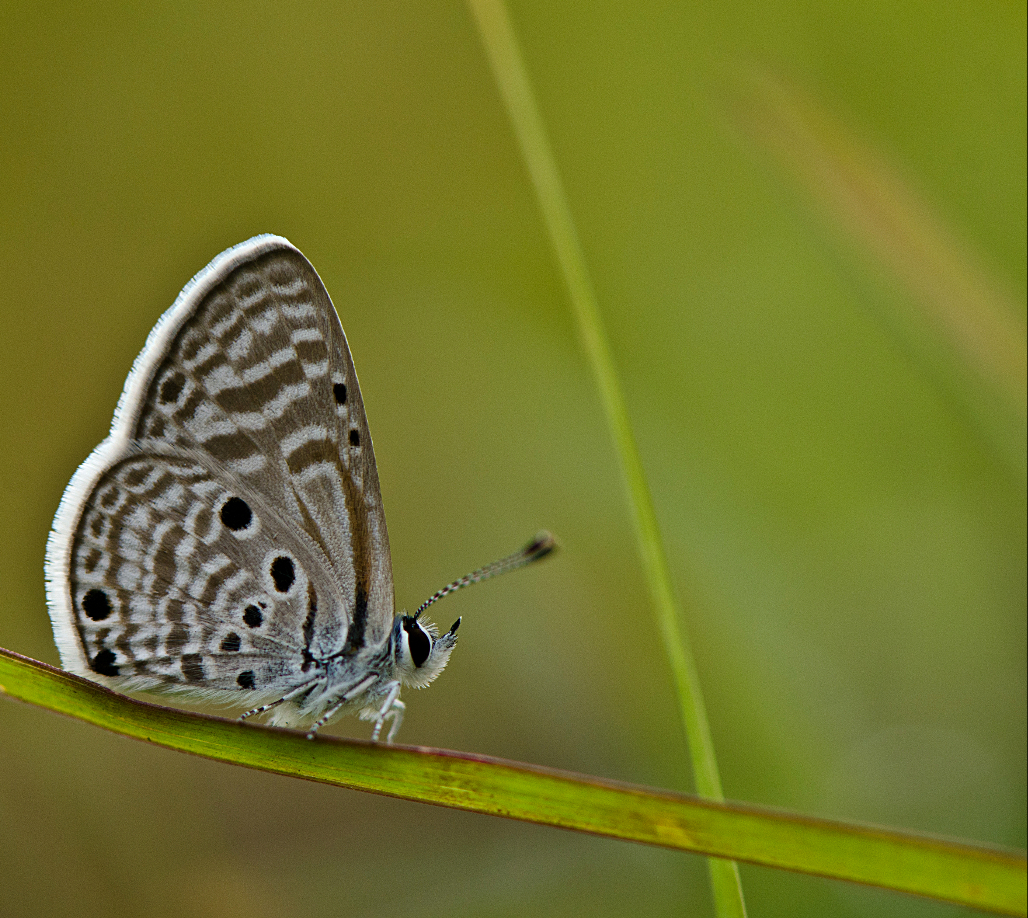
Ventral view

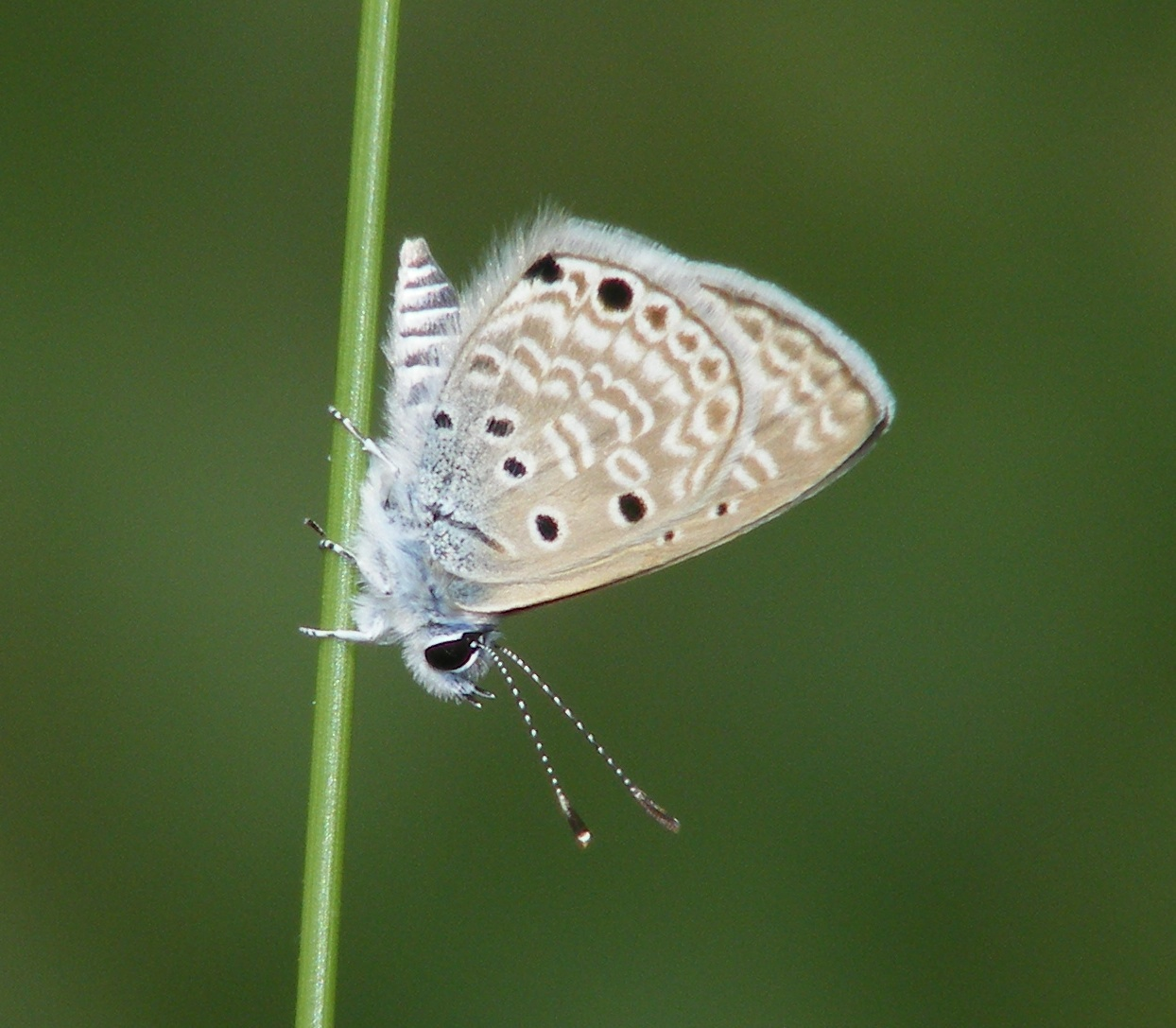
Ventral view

===== Azanus uranus (dull babul blue) =====
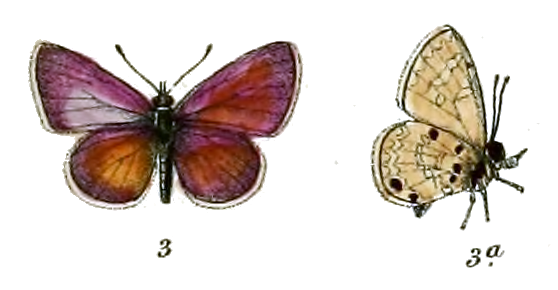
Illustration

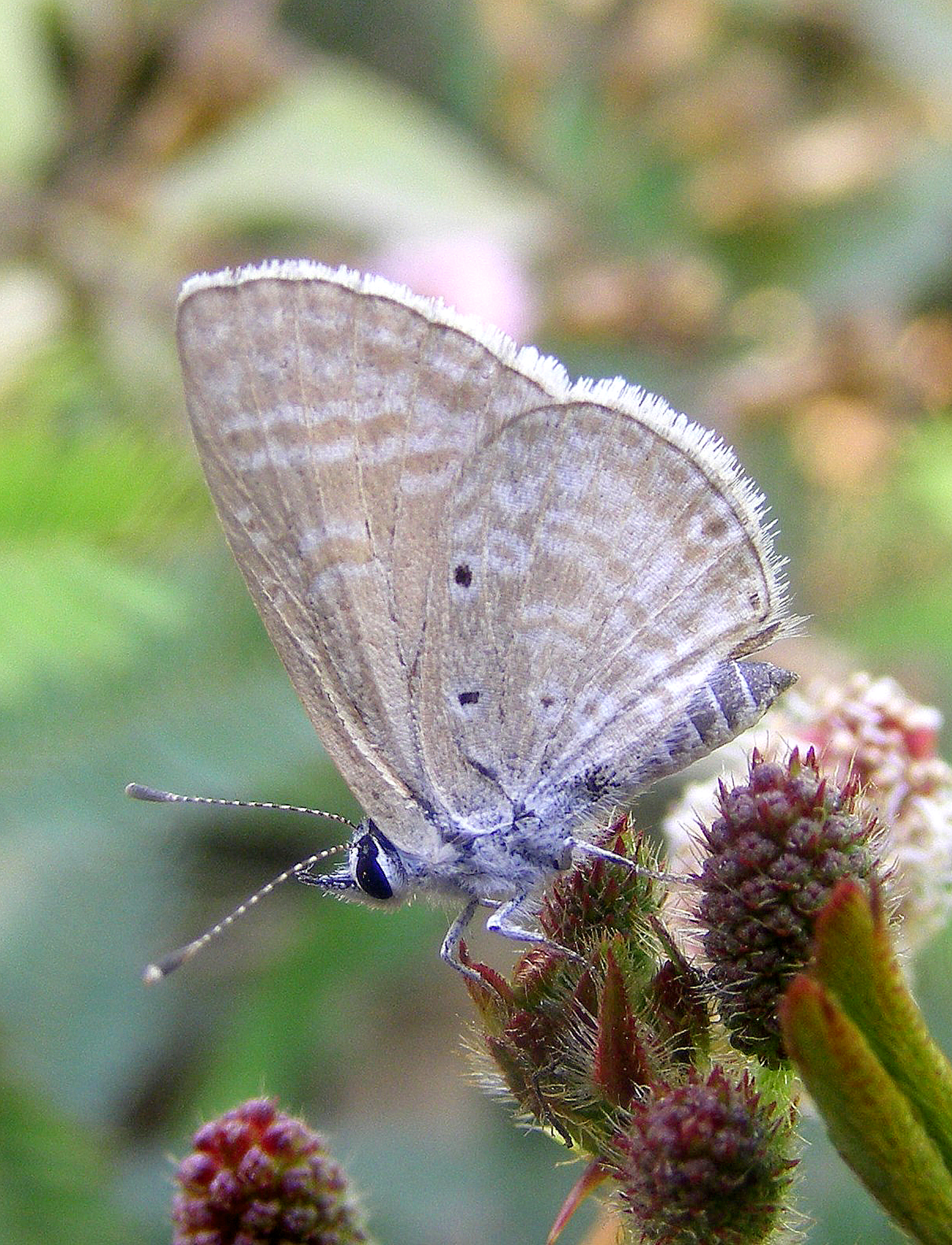
Ventral view

==== Genus: Caleta ====
===== Caleta decidia (angled Pierrot) =====
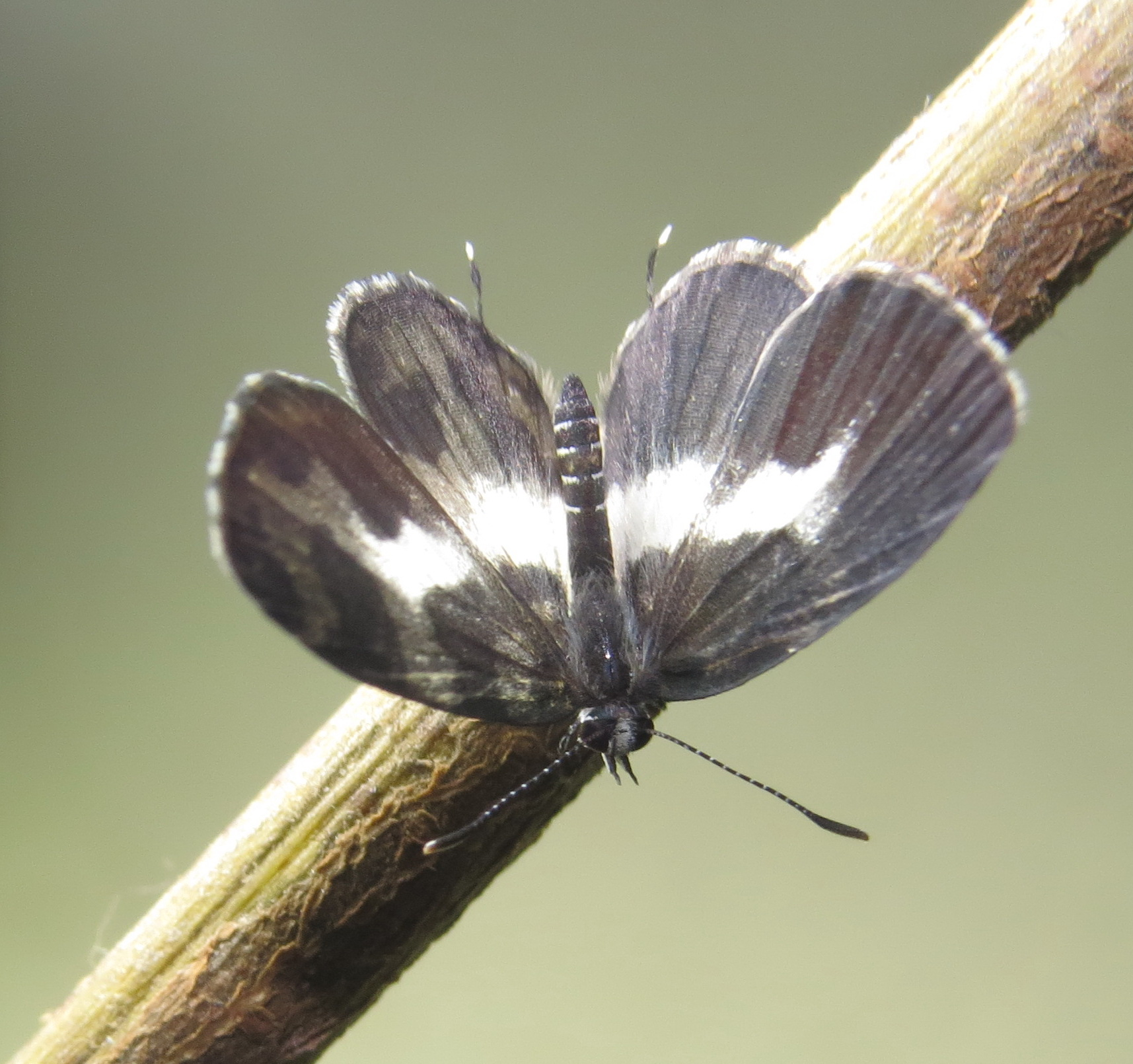
Dorsal view

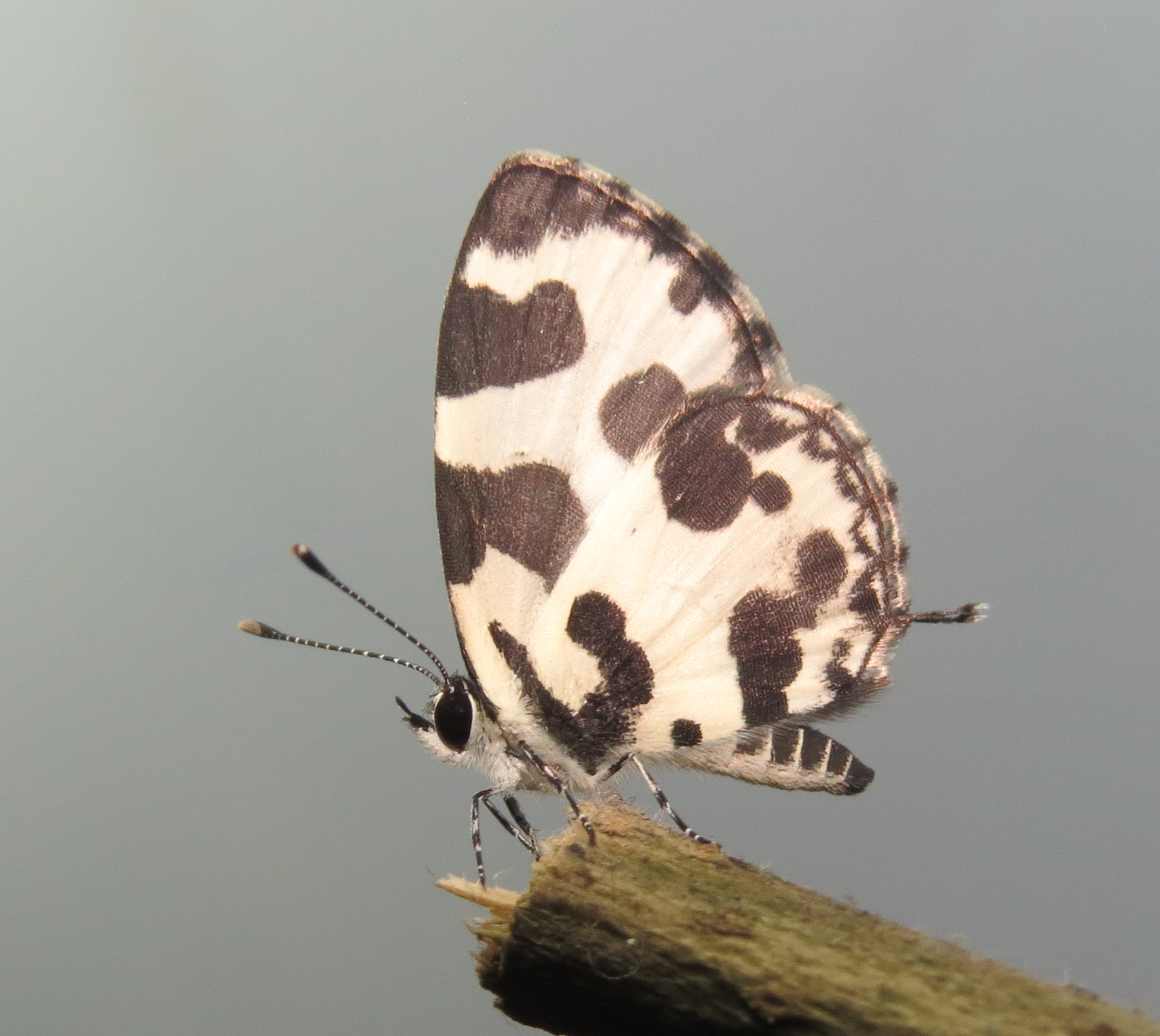
Ventral view

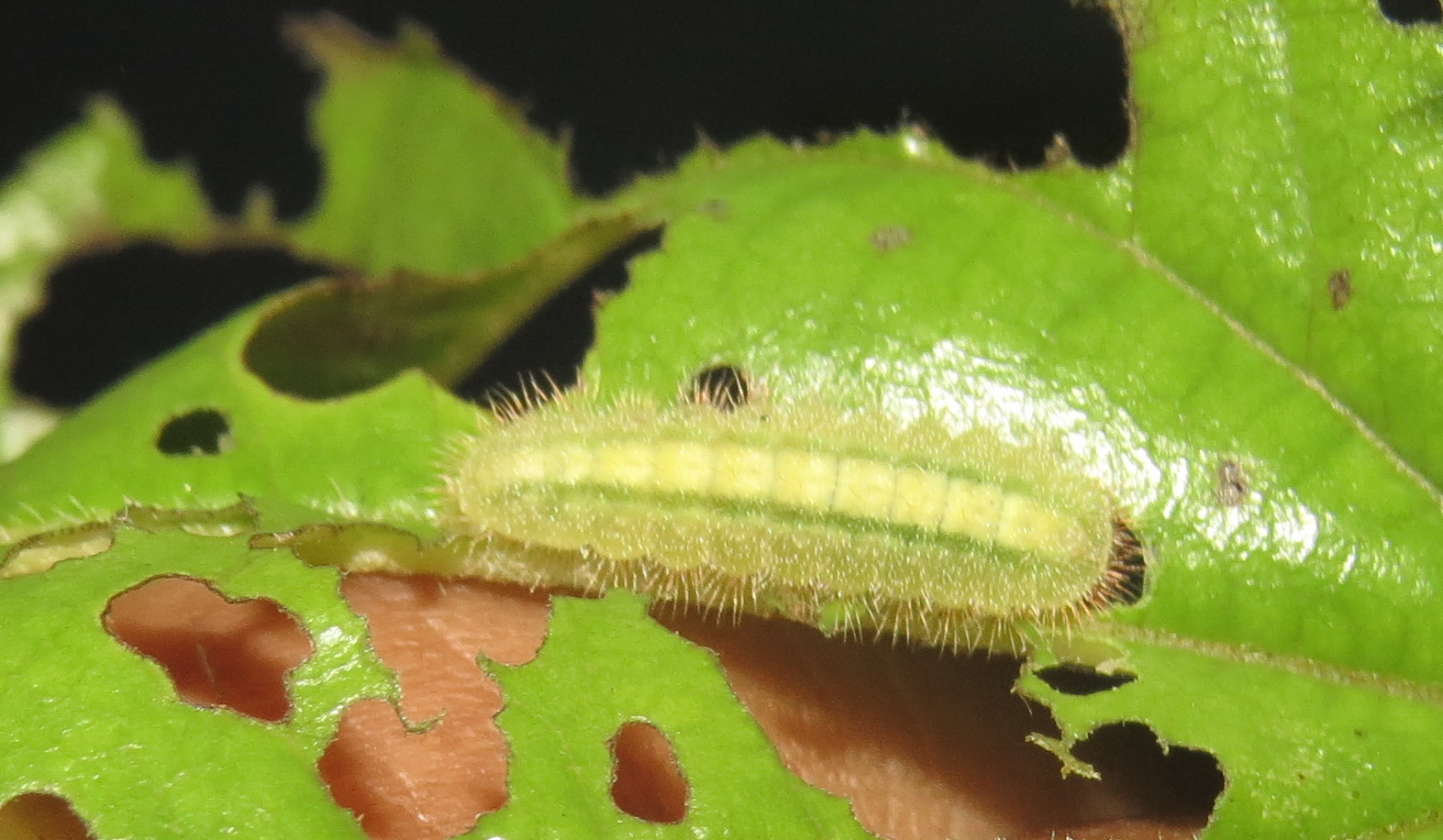
Larva

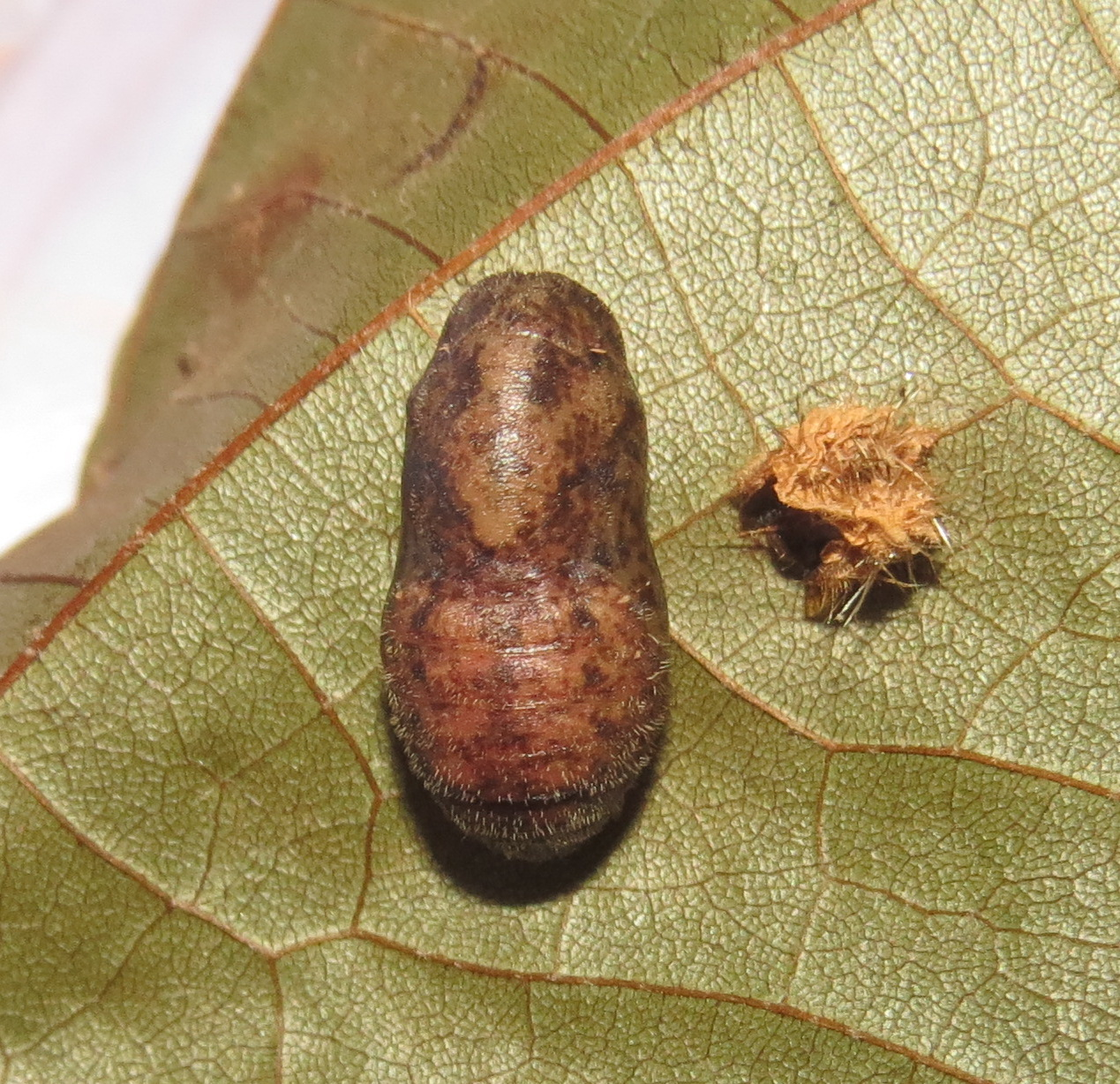
Pupa

==== Genus: Castalius ====
===== Castalius rosimon (common Pierrot) =====
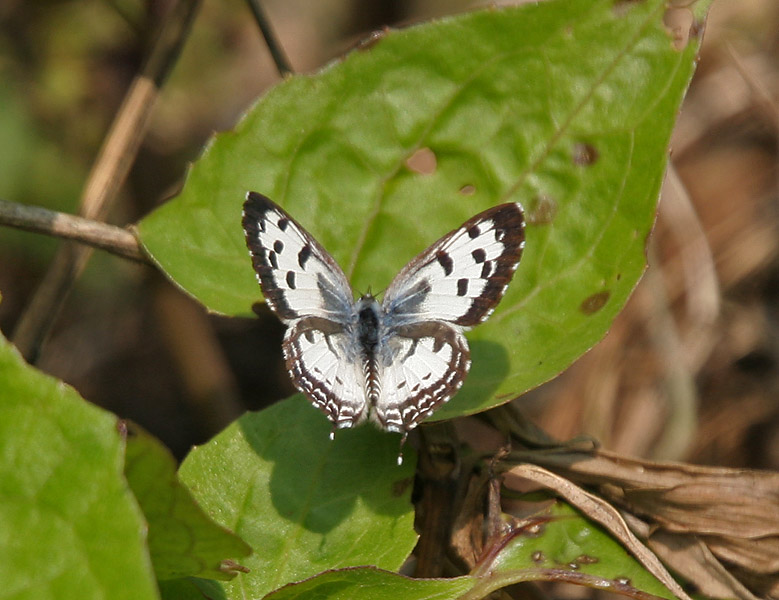
Dorsal view (male)

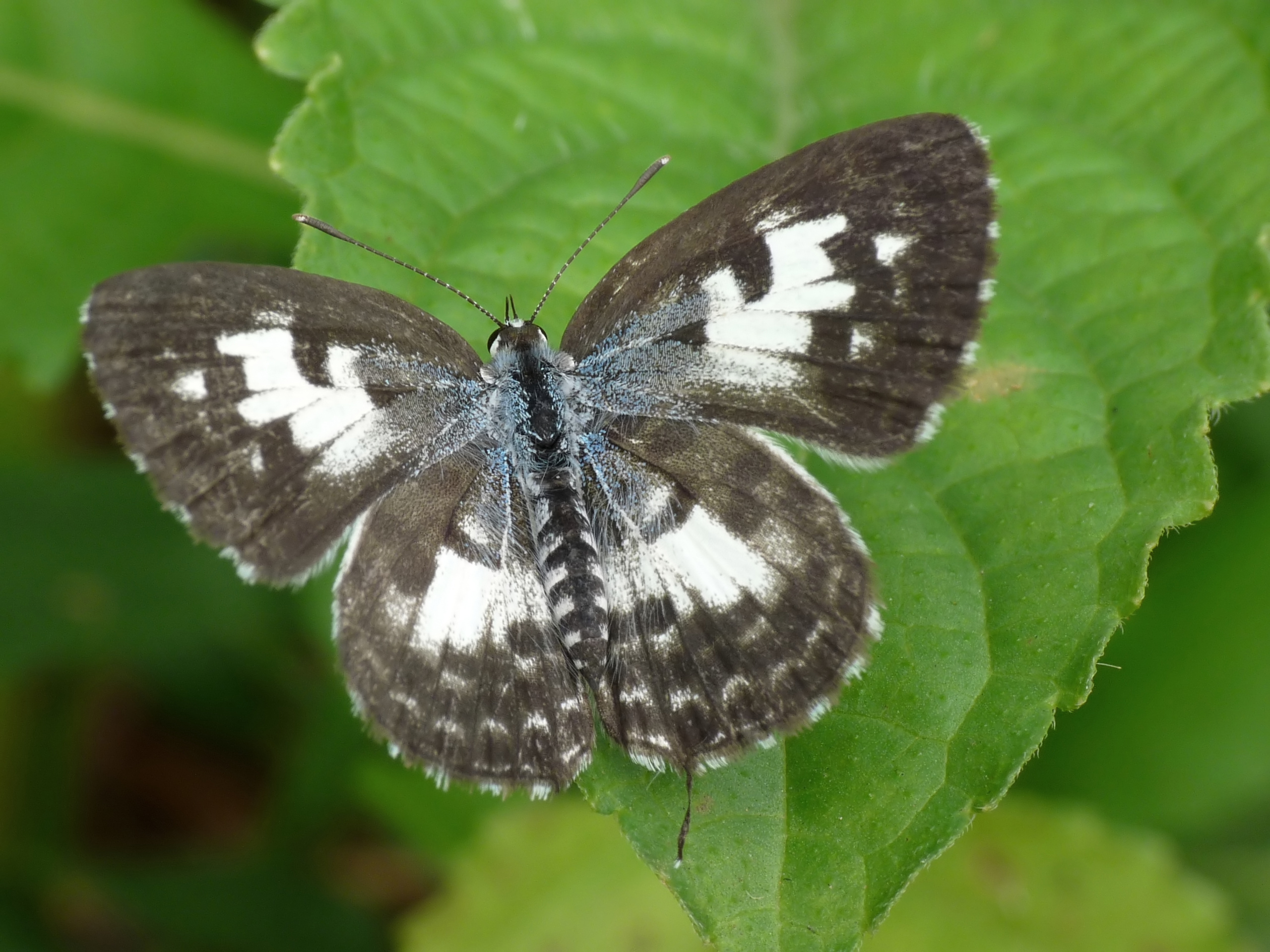
Dorsal view (female)

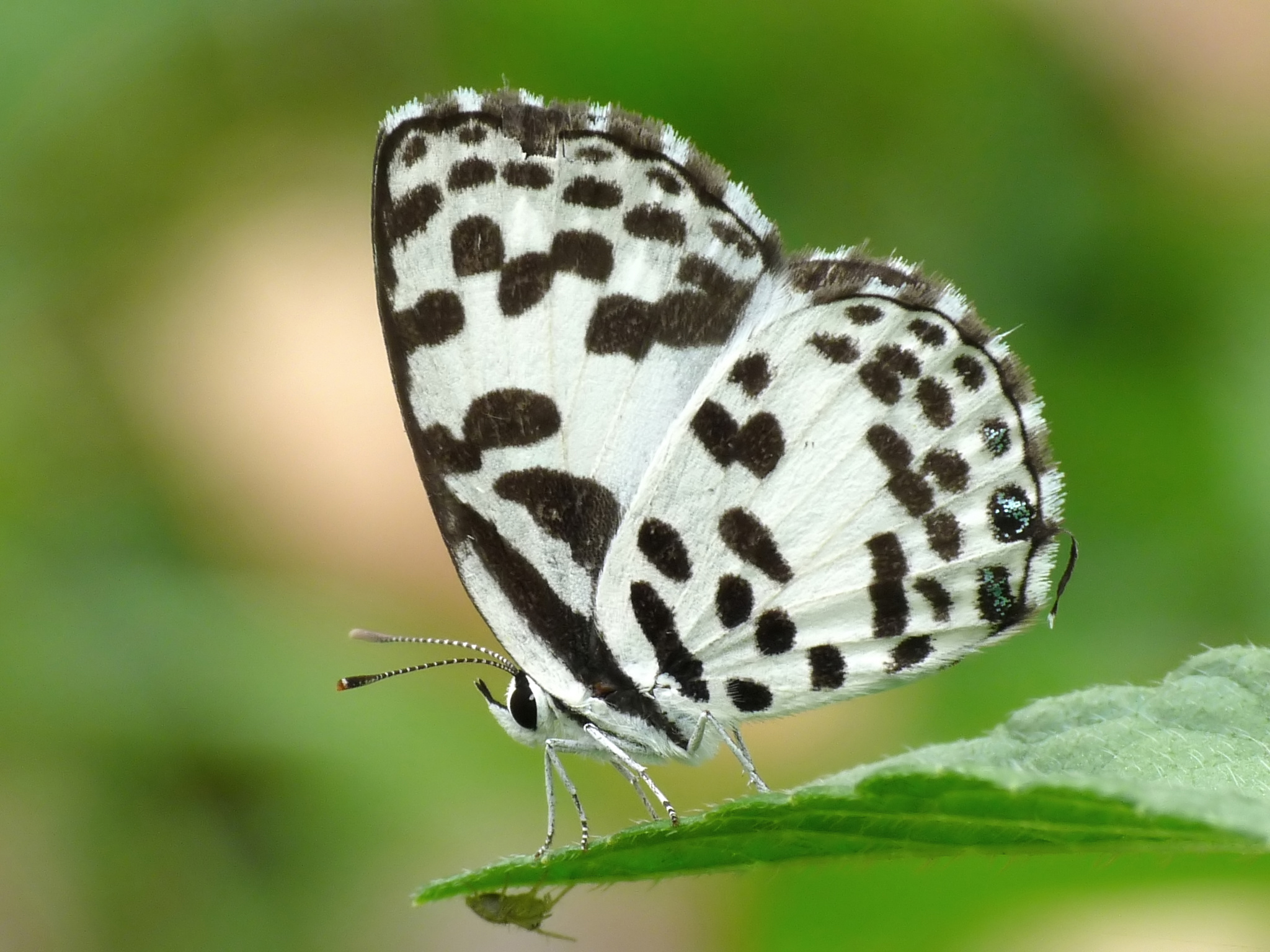
Ventral view

==== Genus: Catochrysops ====
===== Catochrysops panormus (silver forget-me-not) =====
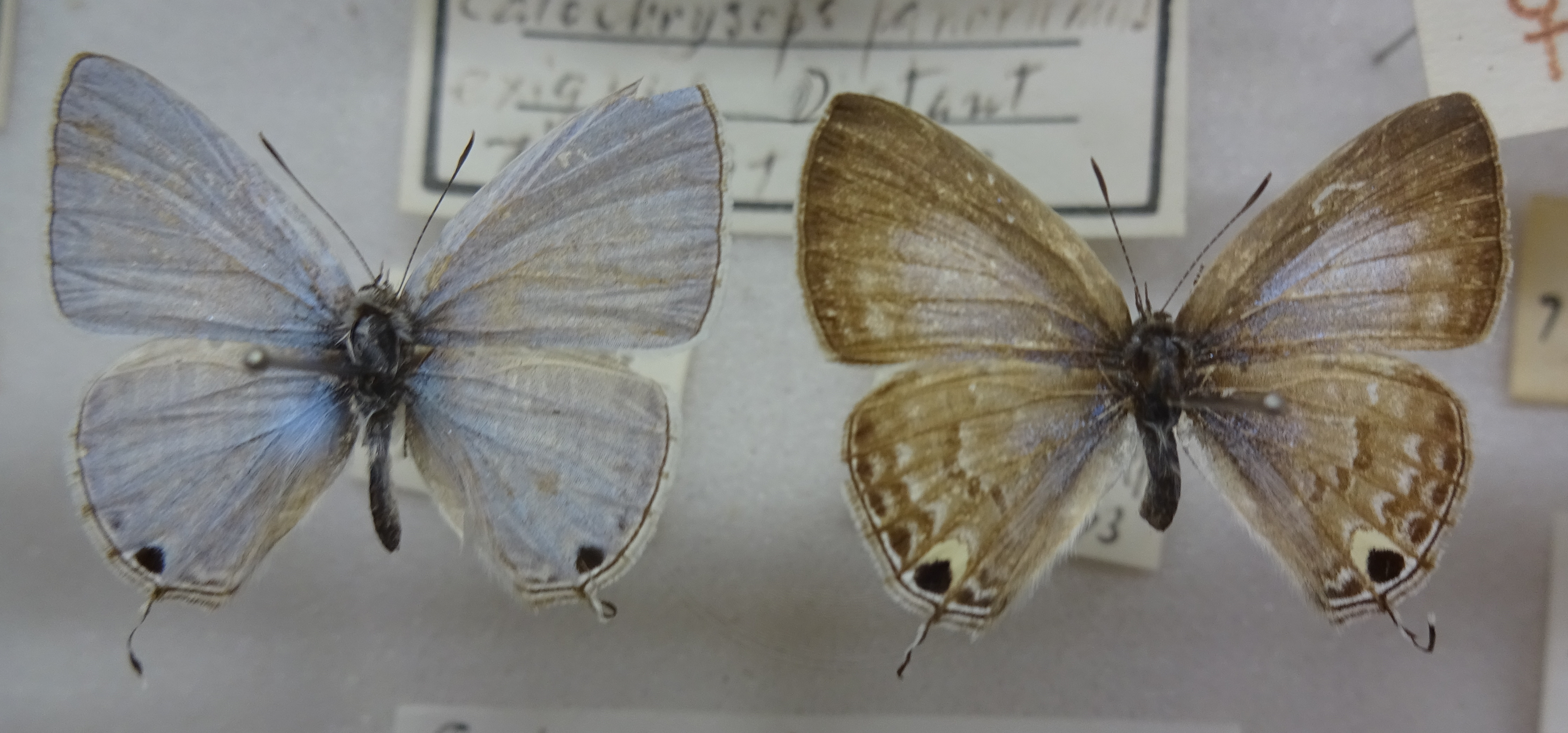
Museum specimen

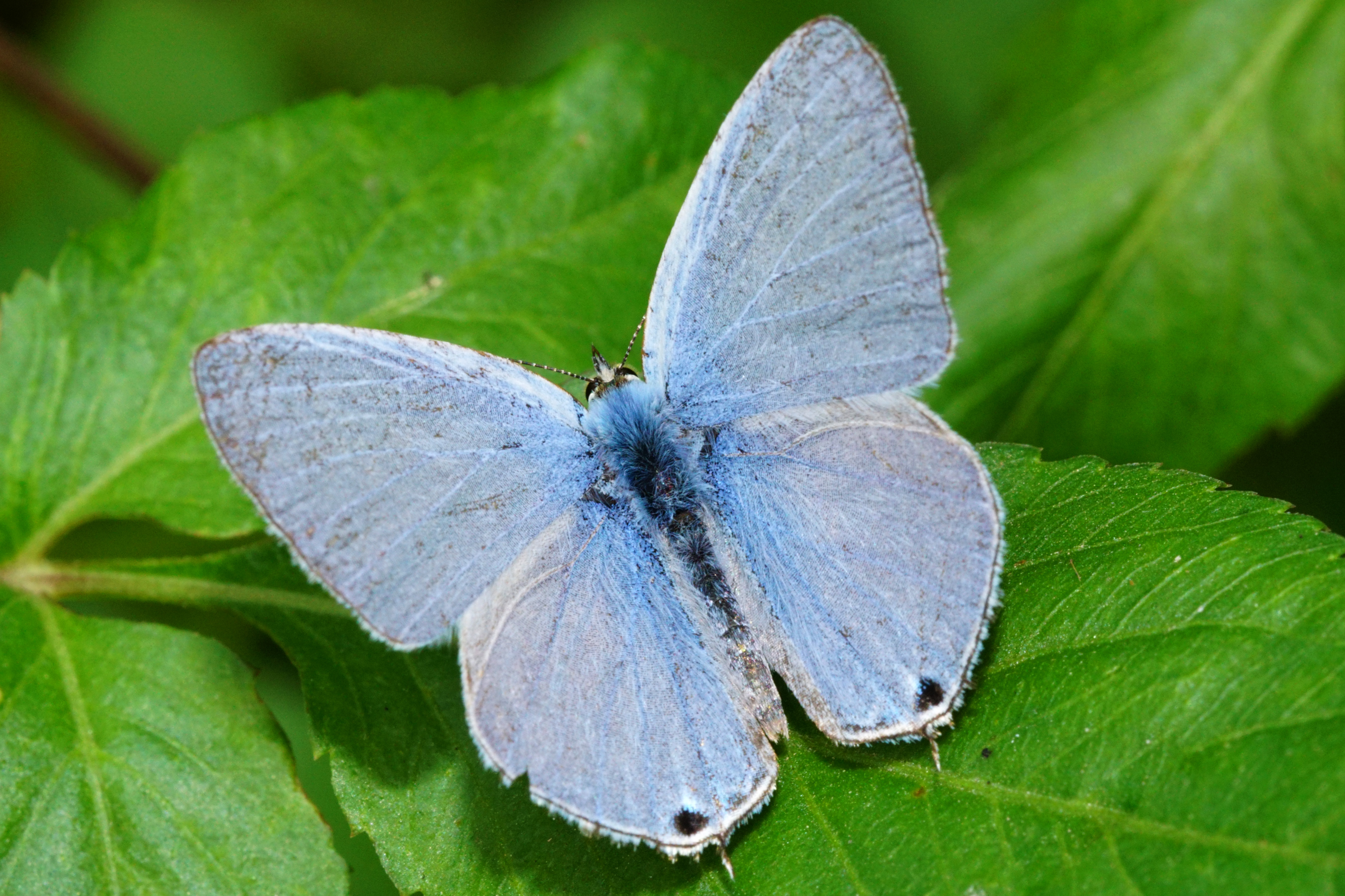
Dorsal view

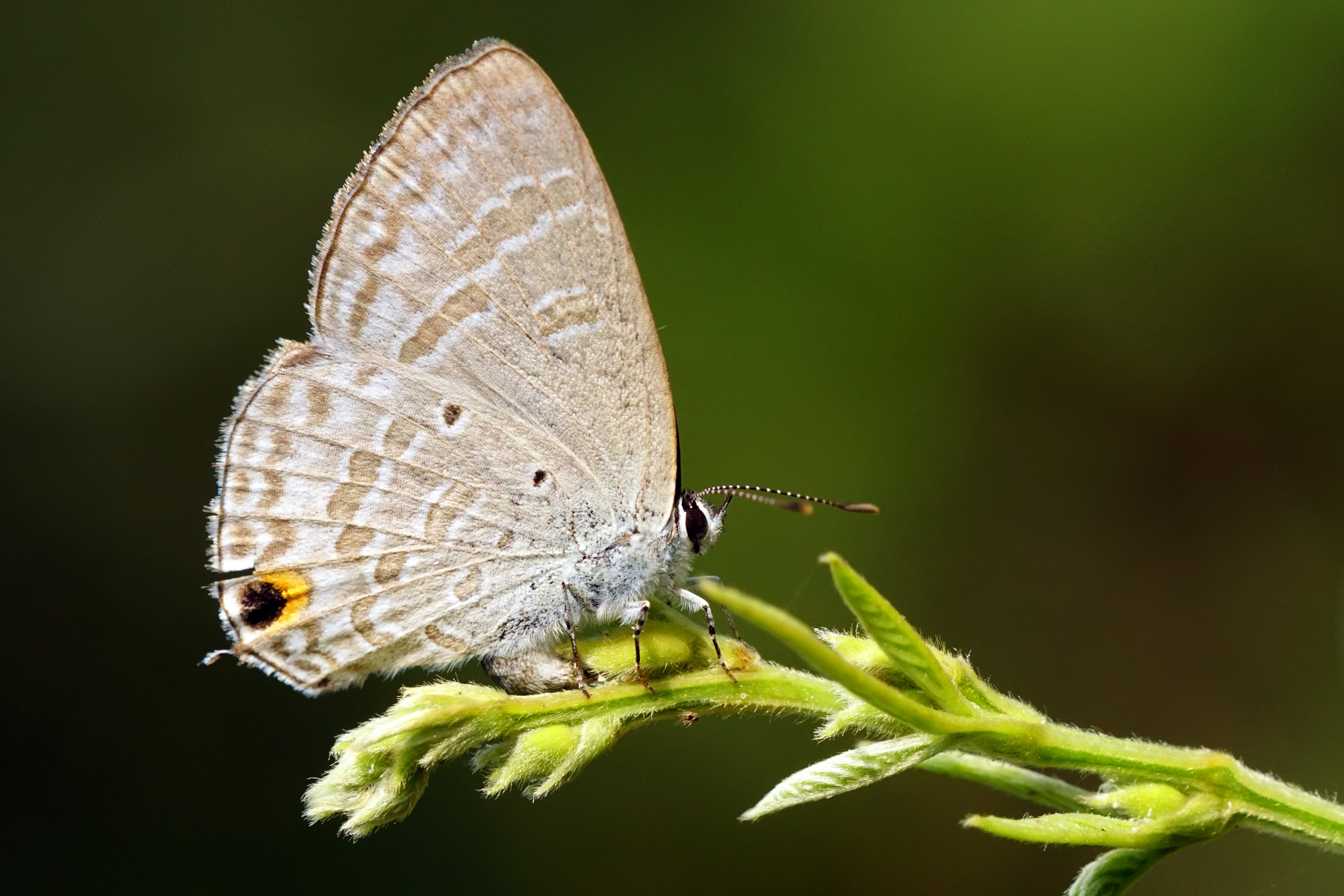
Ventral view

===== Catochrysops strabo (forget-me-not) =====
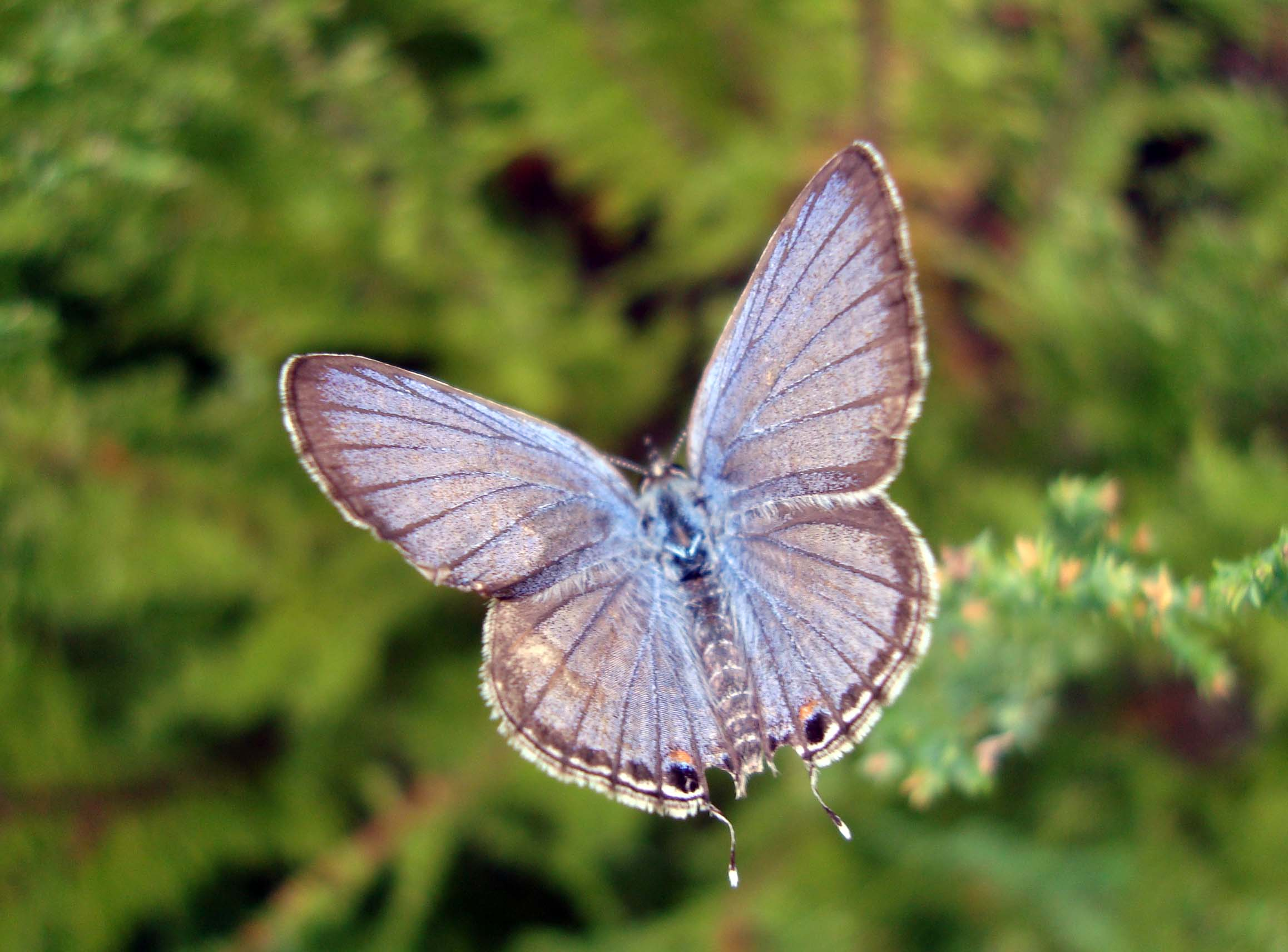
Dorsal view (male)

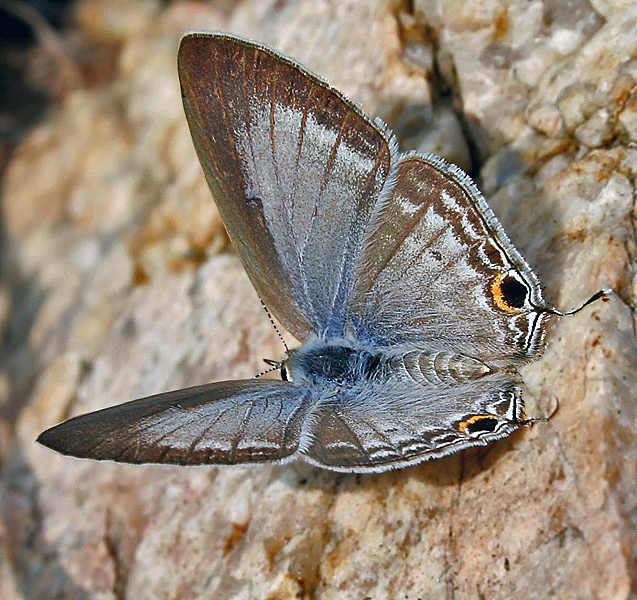
Dorsal view (female)

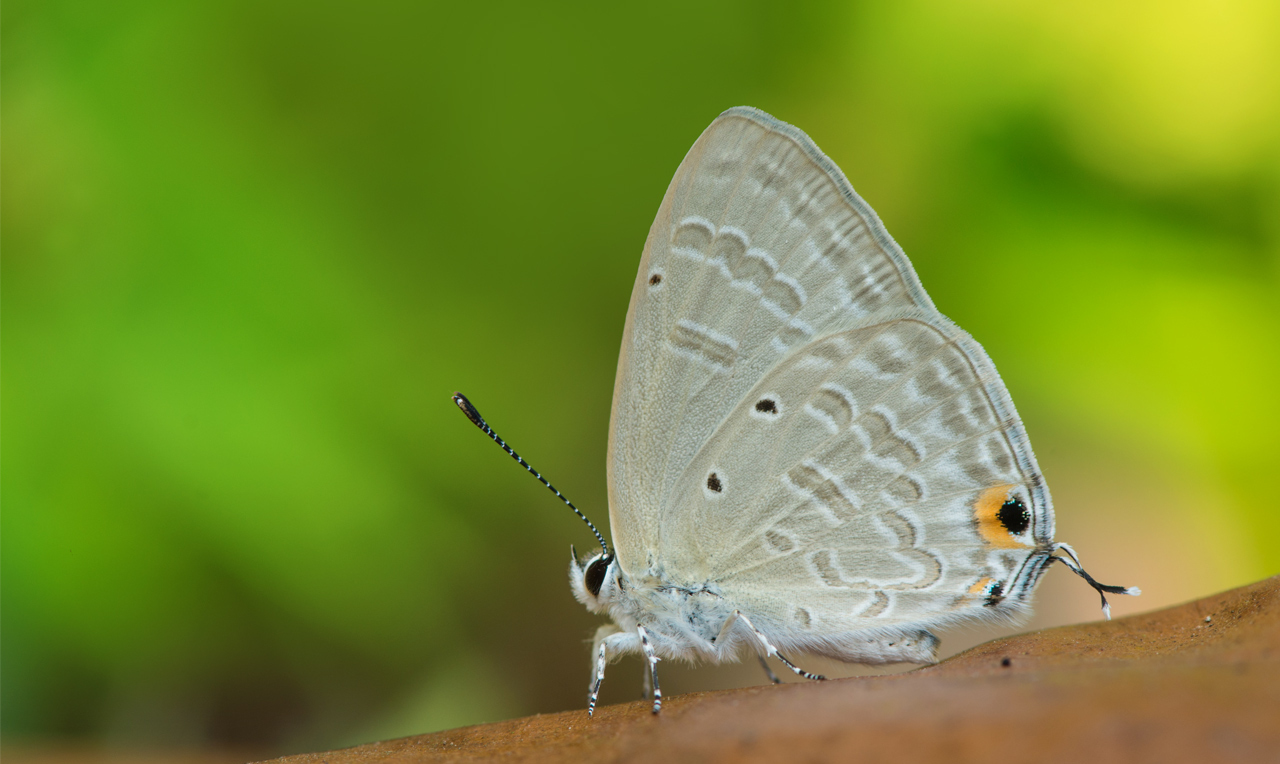
Ventral view

==== Genus: Celastrina ====
===== Celastrina lavendularis (plain hedge blue) =====
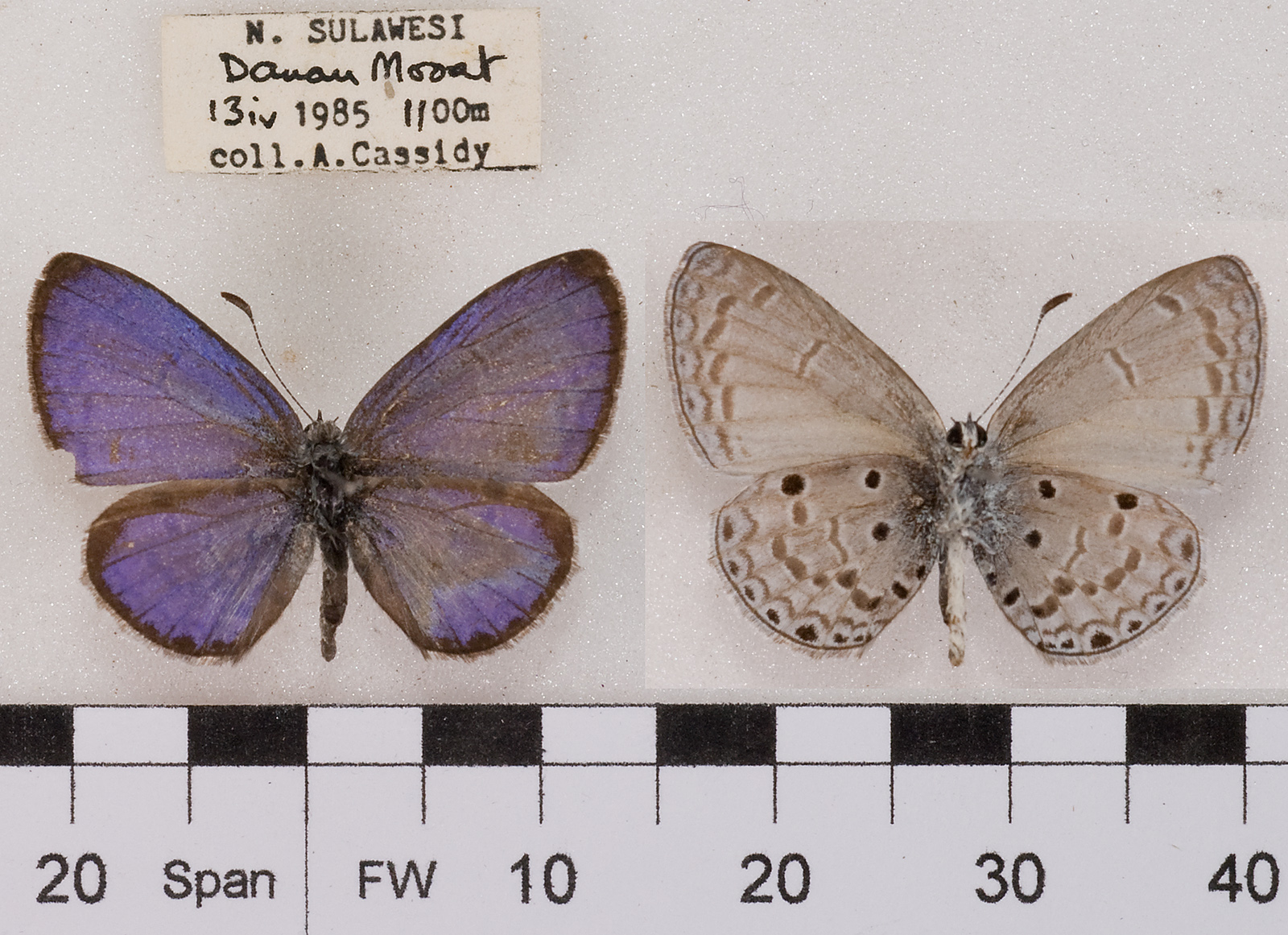
Museum specimen

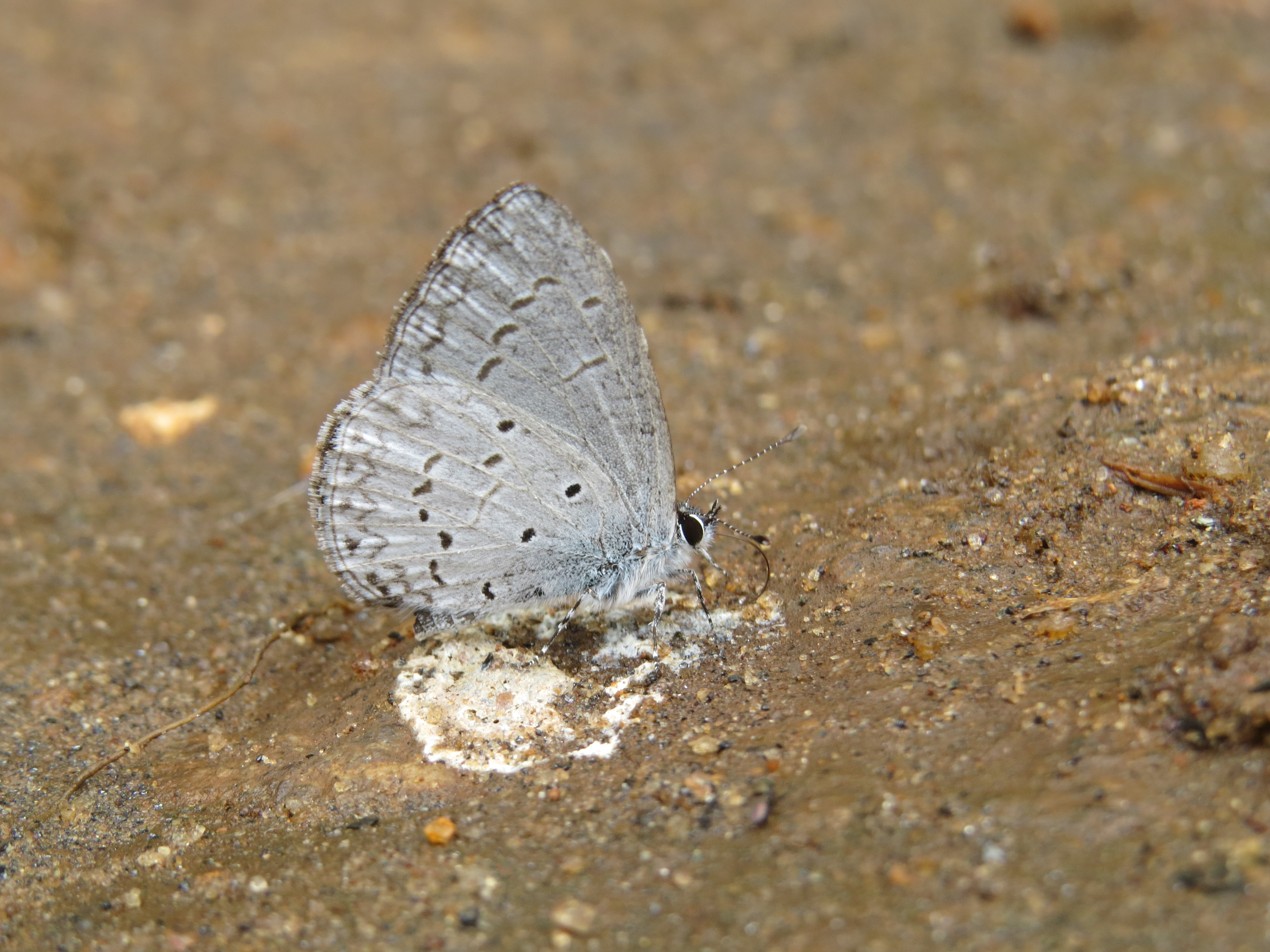
Ventral view

==== Genus: Celatoxia ====
===== Celatoxia albidisca (white-disc hedge blue) =====
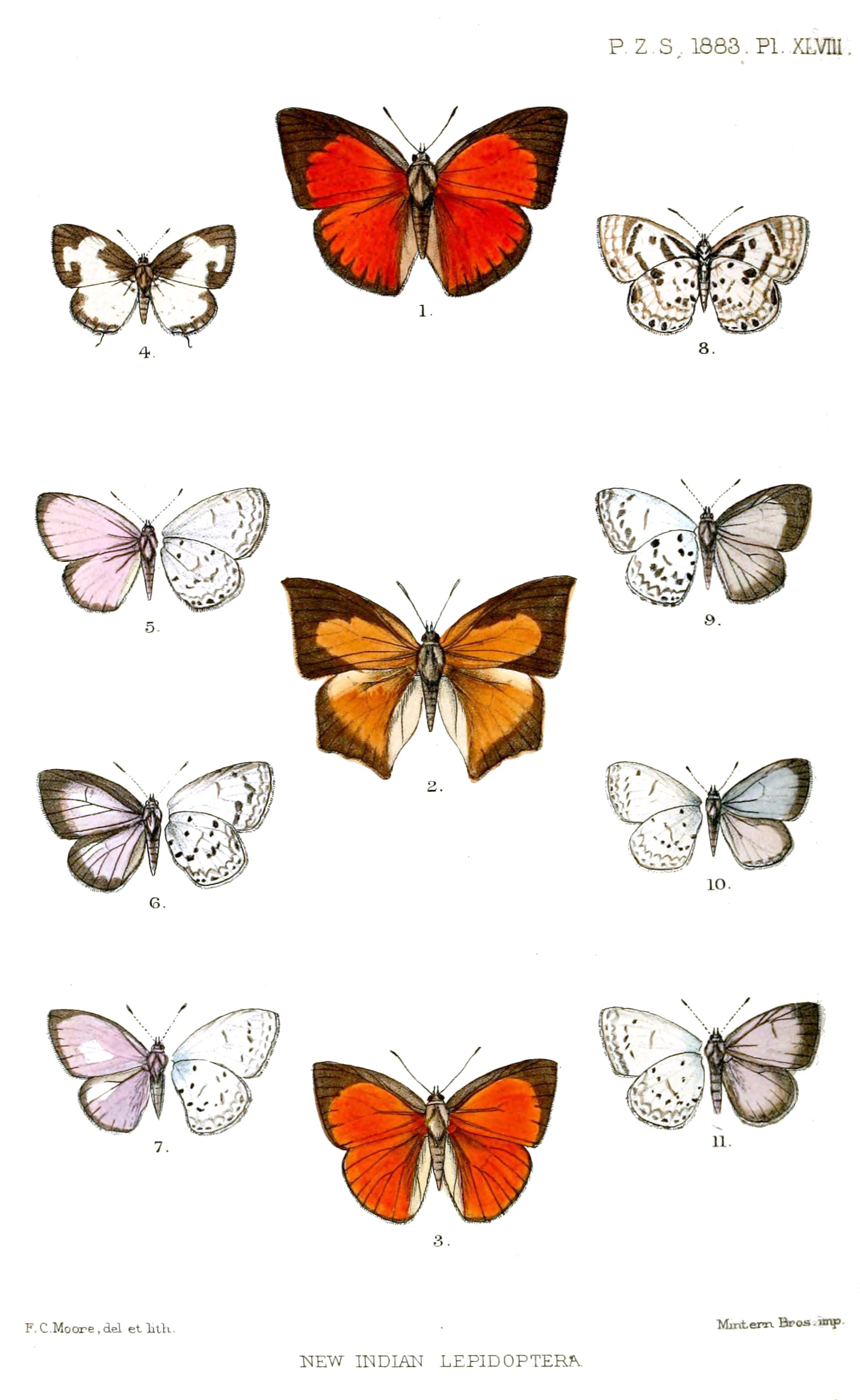
Illustration

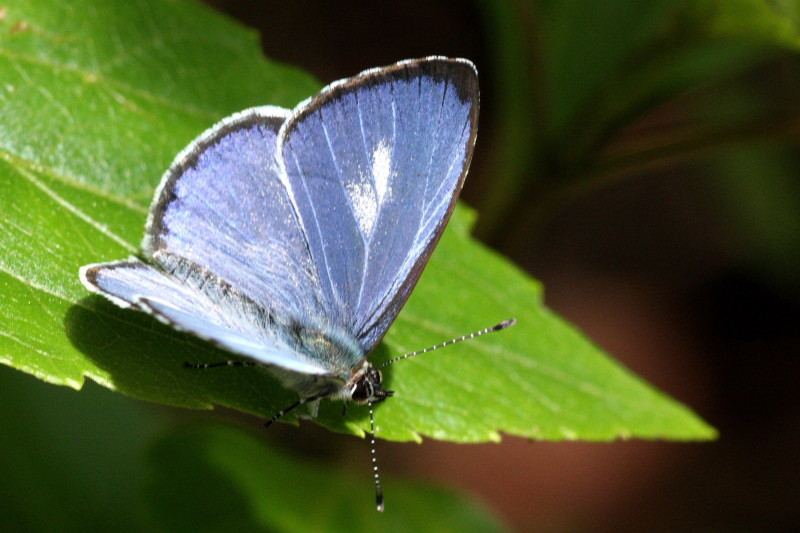
Dorsal view

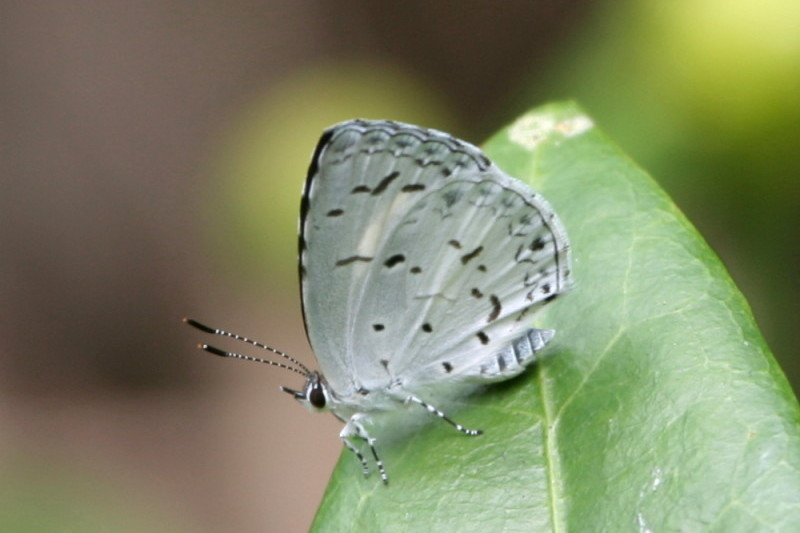
Ventral view

==== Genus: Chilades ====
===== Chilades lajus (lime blue) =====
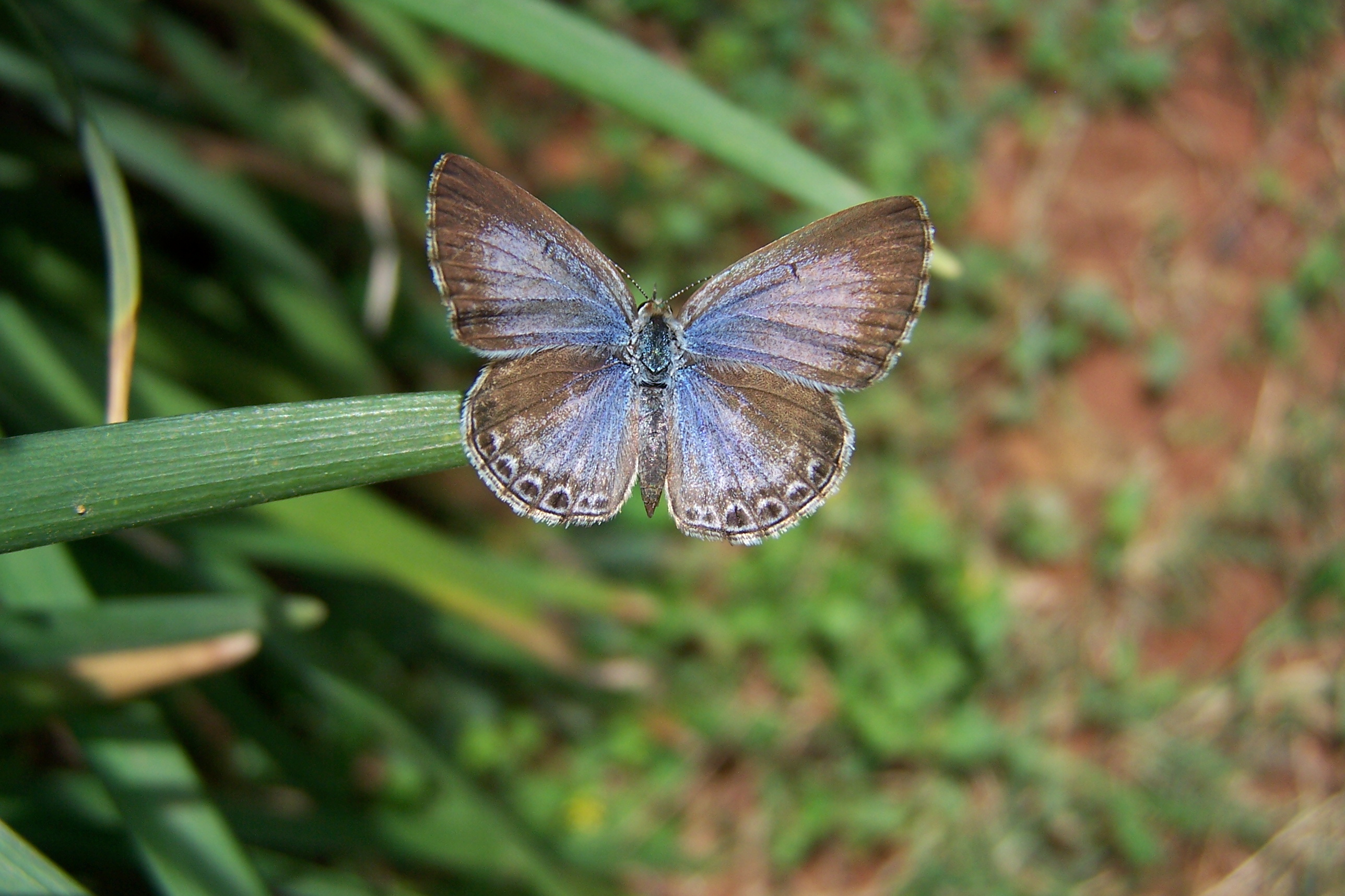
Dorsal view (male)

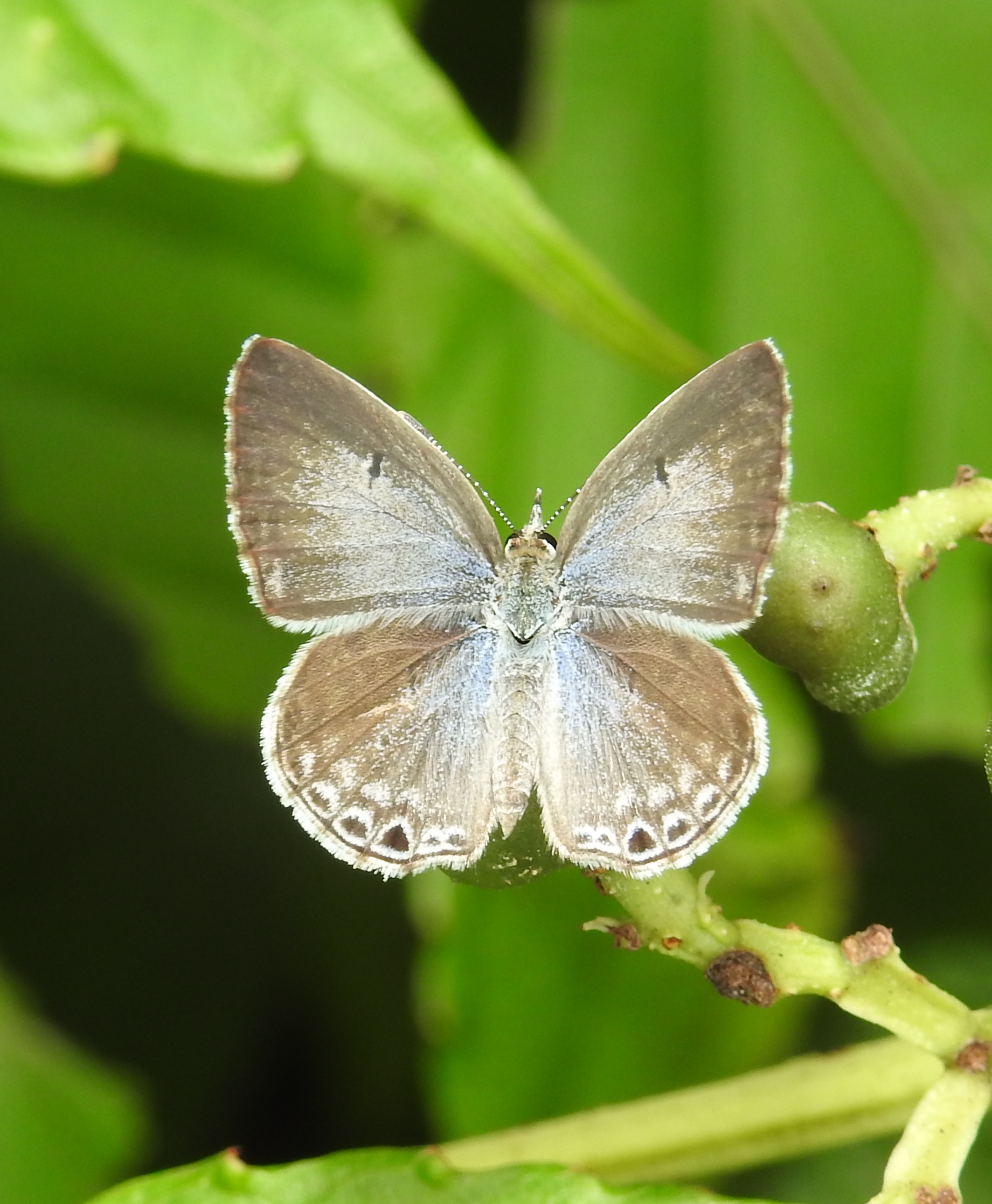
Dorsal view (female)

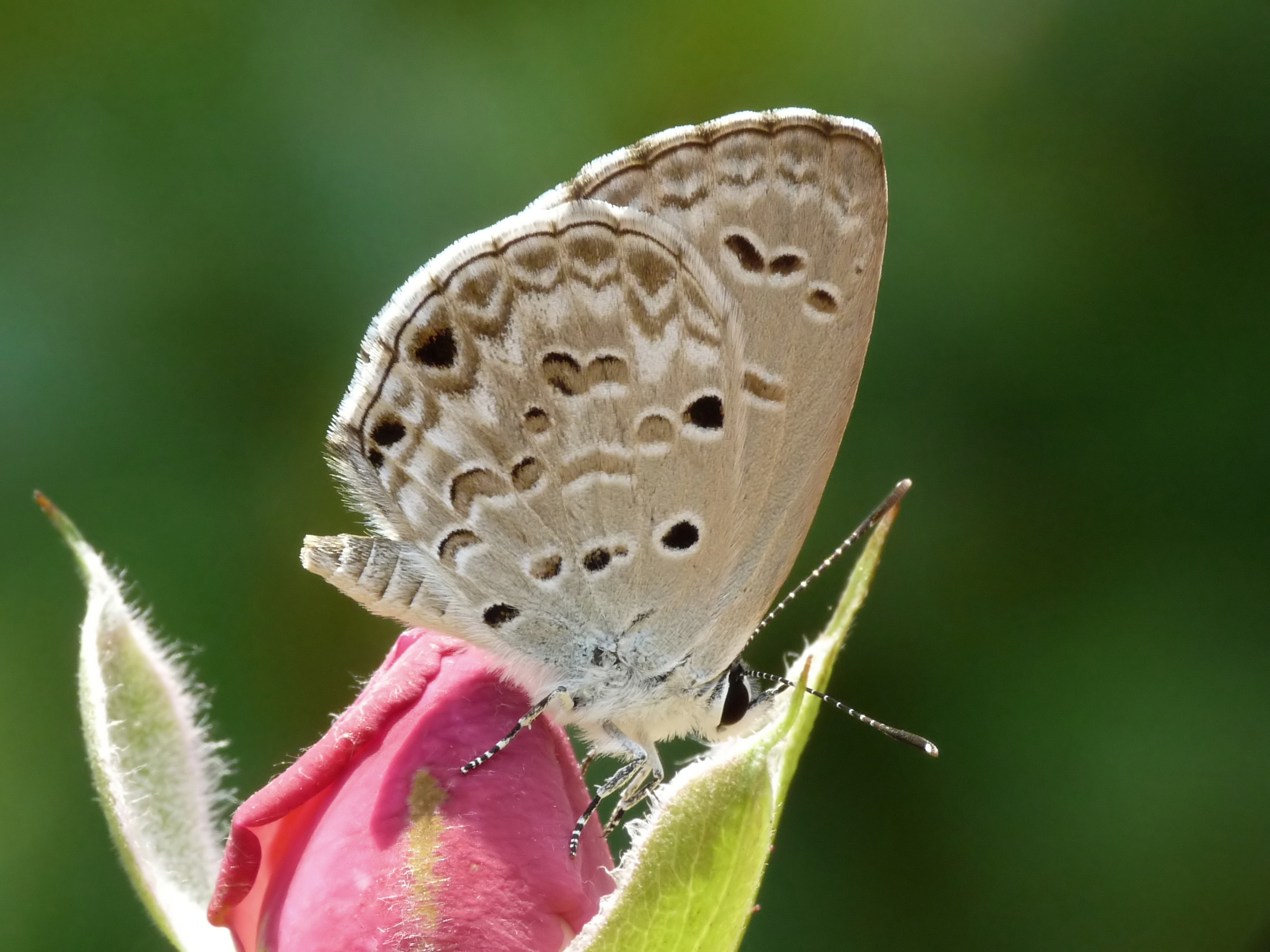
Ventral view (wet-season form)

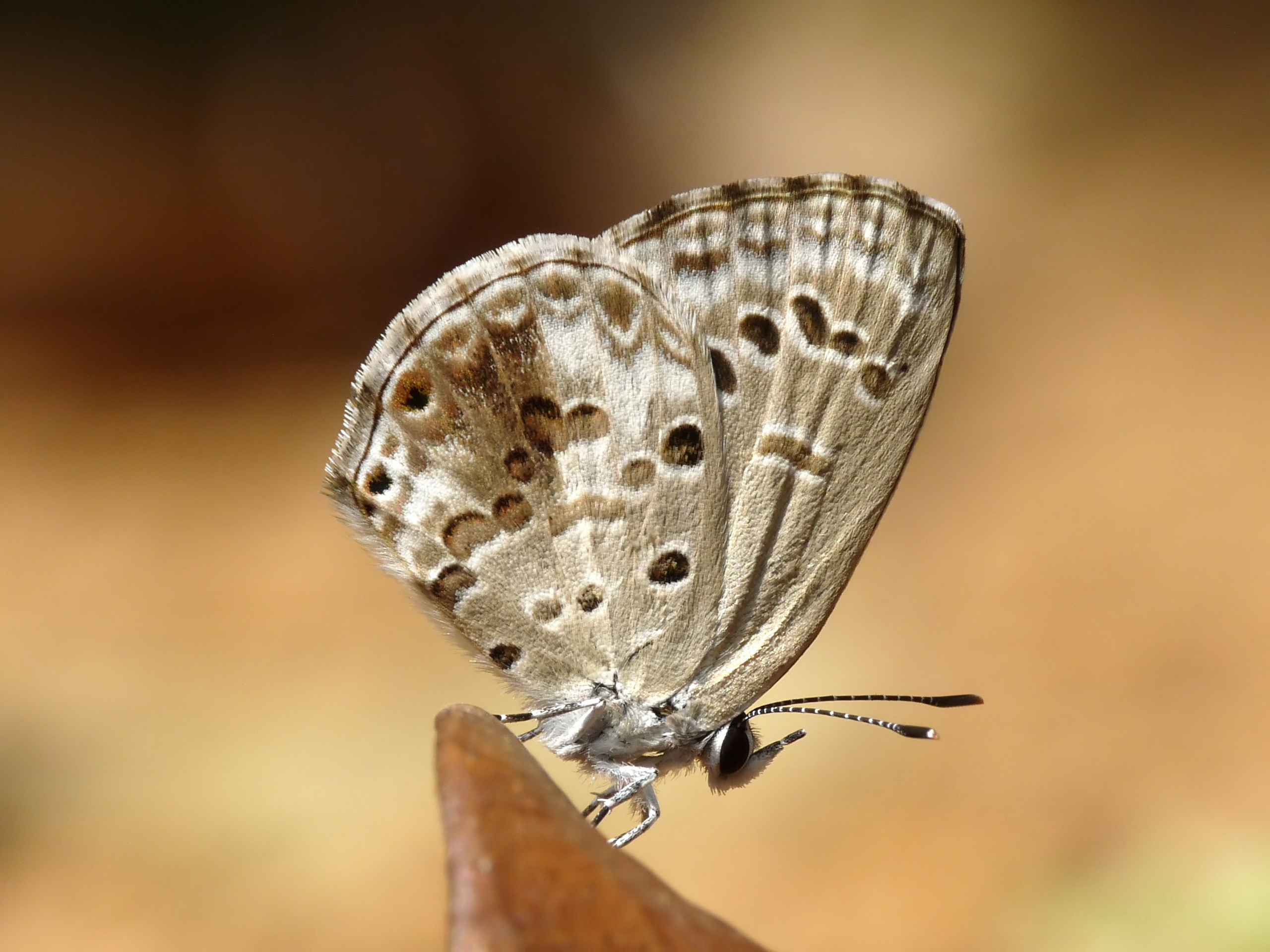
Ventral view (dry-season form)

===== Chilades parrhasius (small cupid) =====
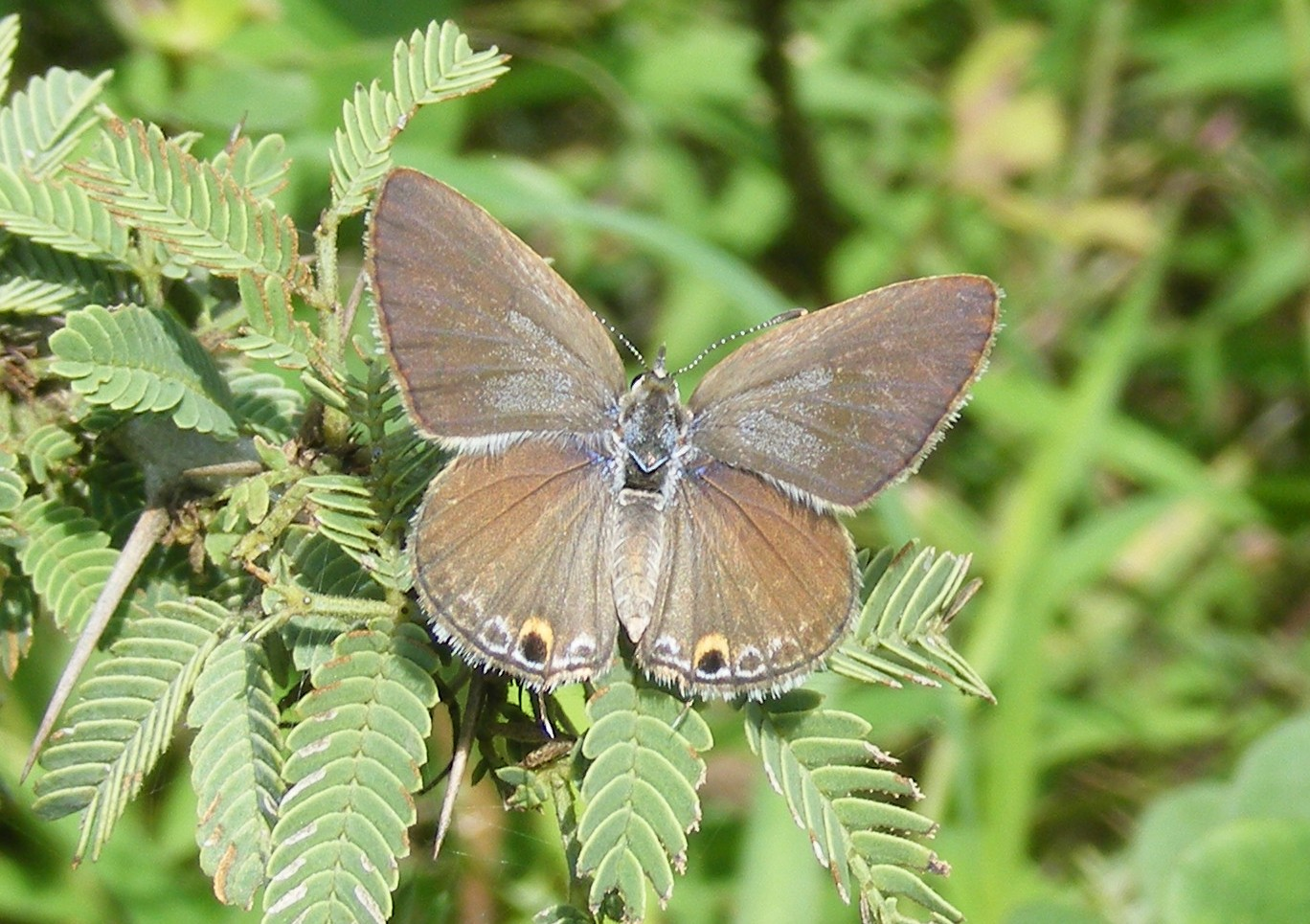
Dorsal view

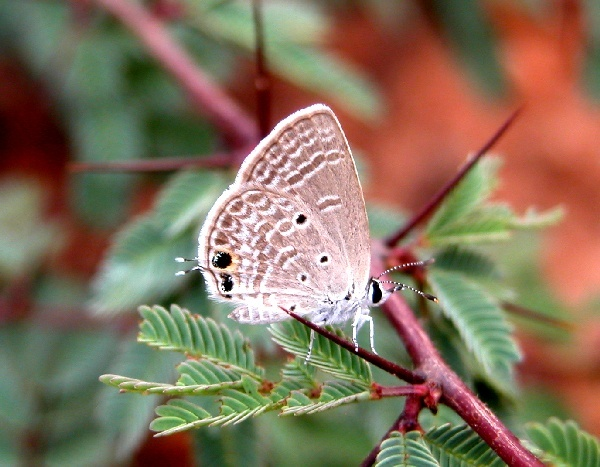
Ventral view

==== Genus: Discolampa ====
===== Discolampa ethion (banded blue Pierrot) =====
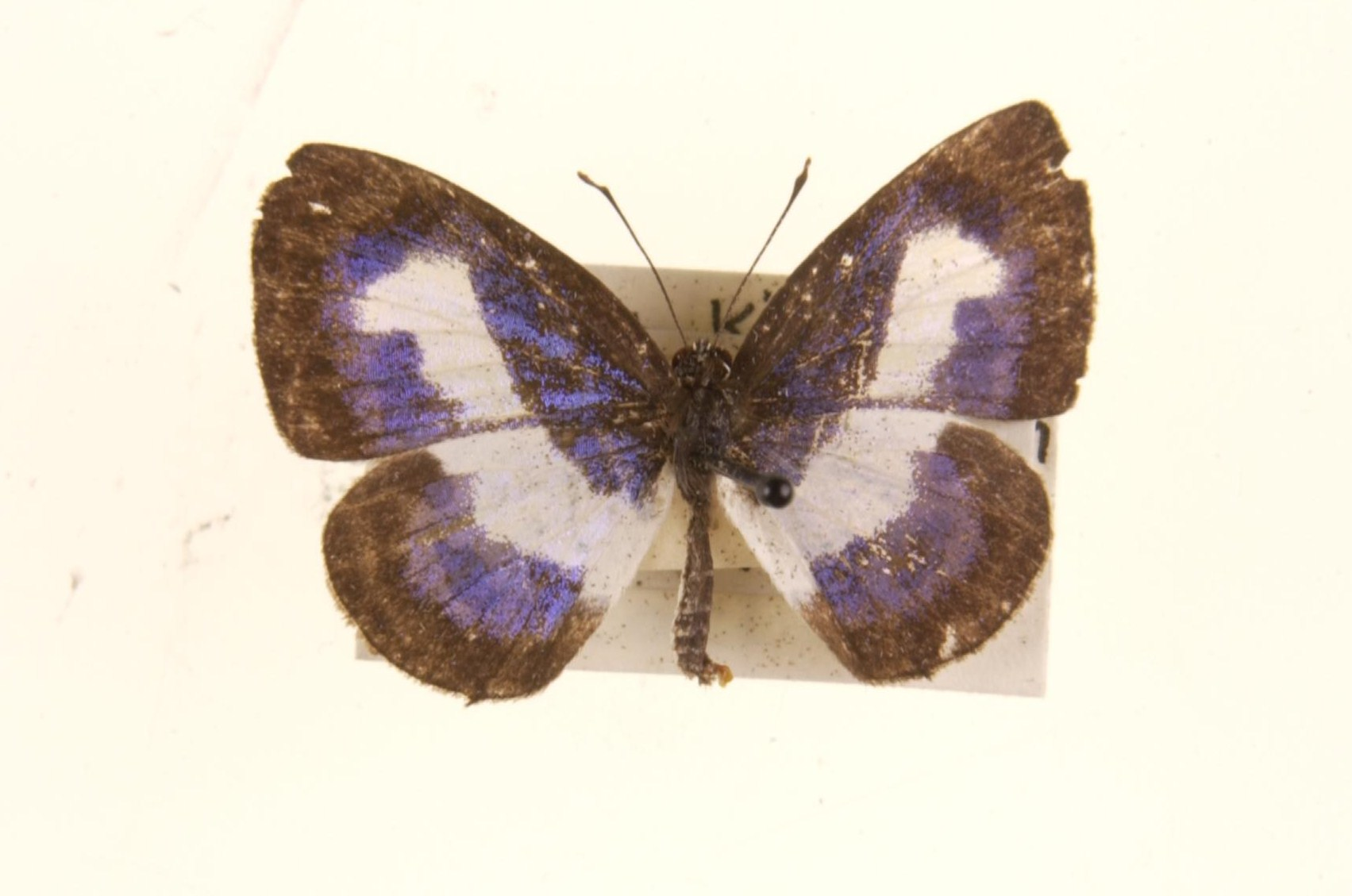
Dorsal view (male)

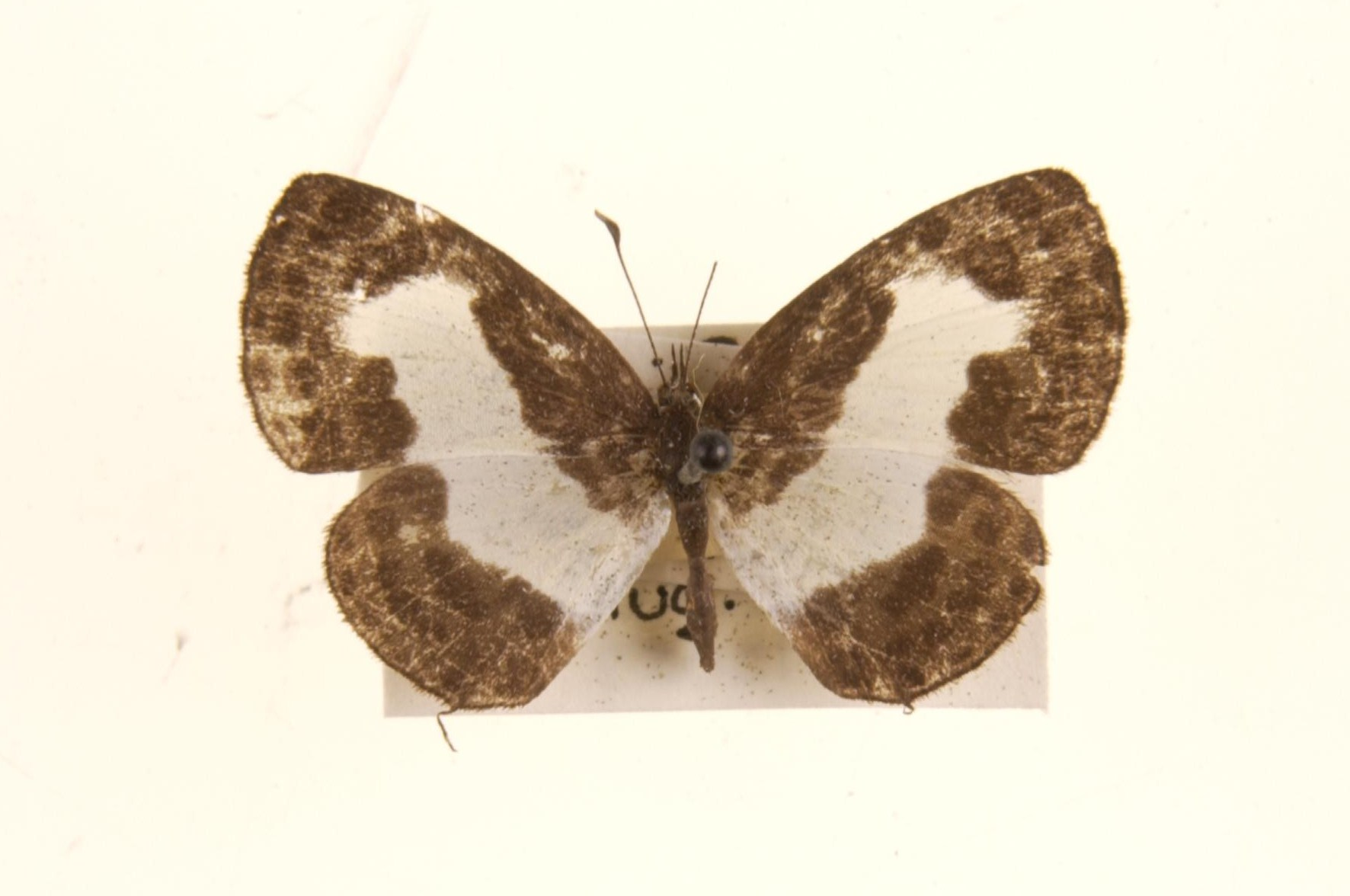
Dorsal view (female)

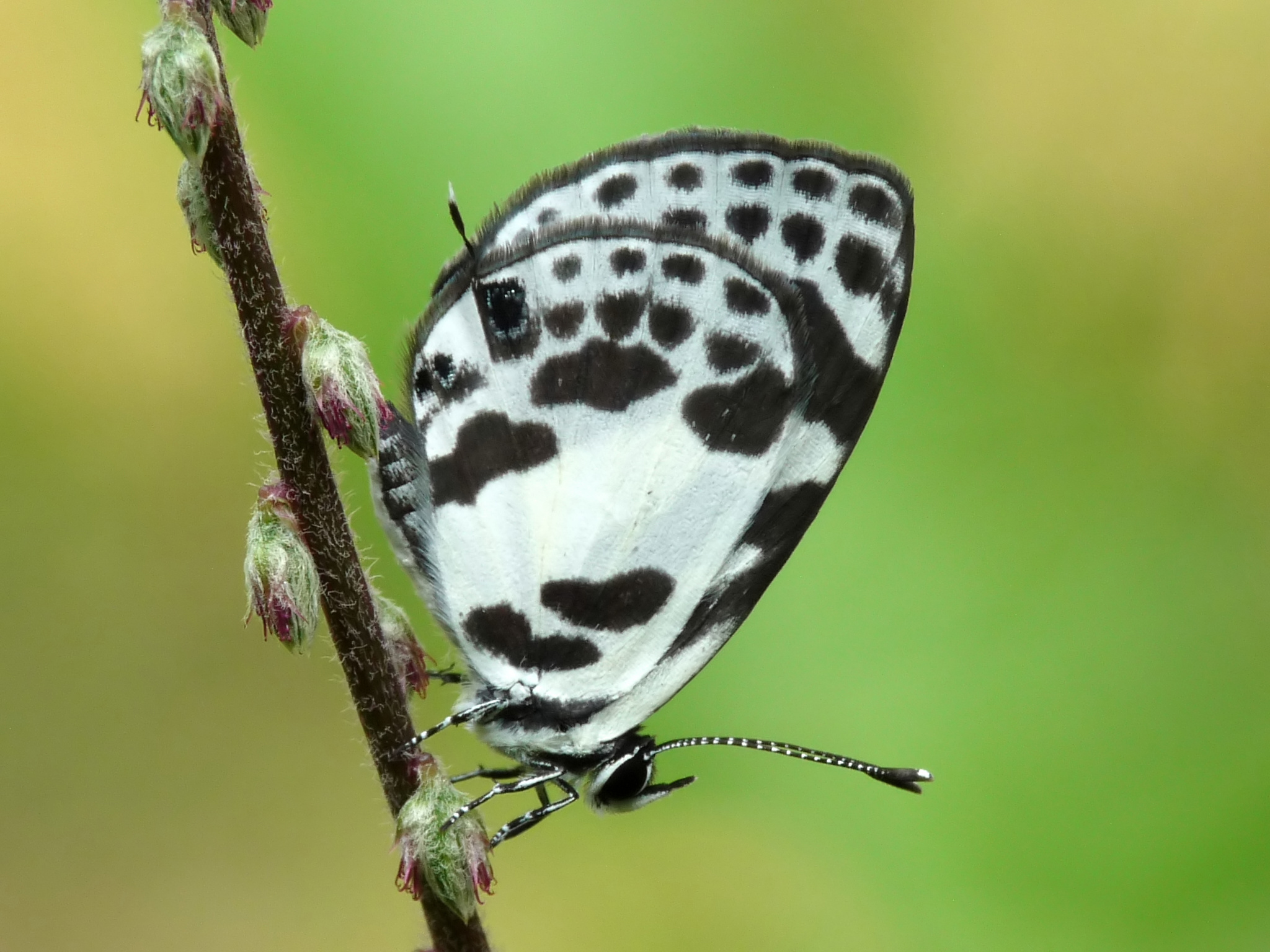
Ventral view

==== Genus: Euchrysops ====
===== Euchrysops cnejus (gram blue) =====
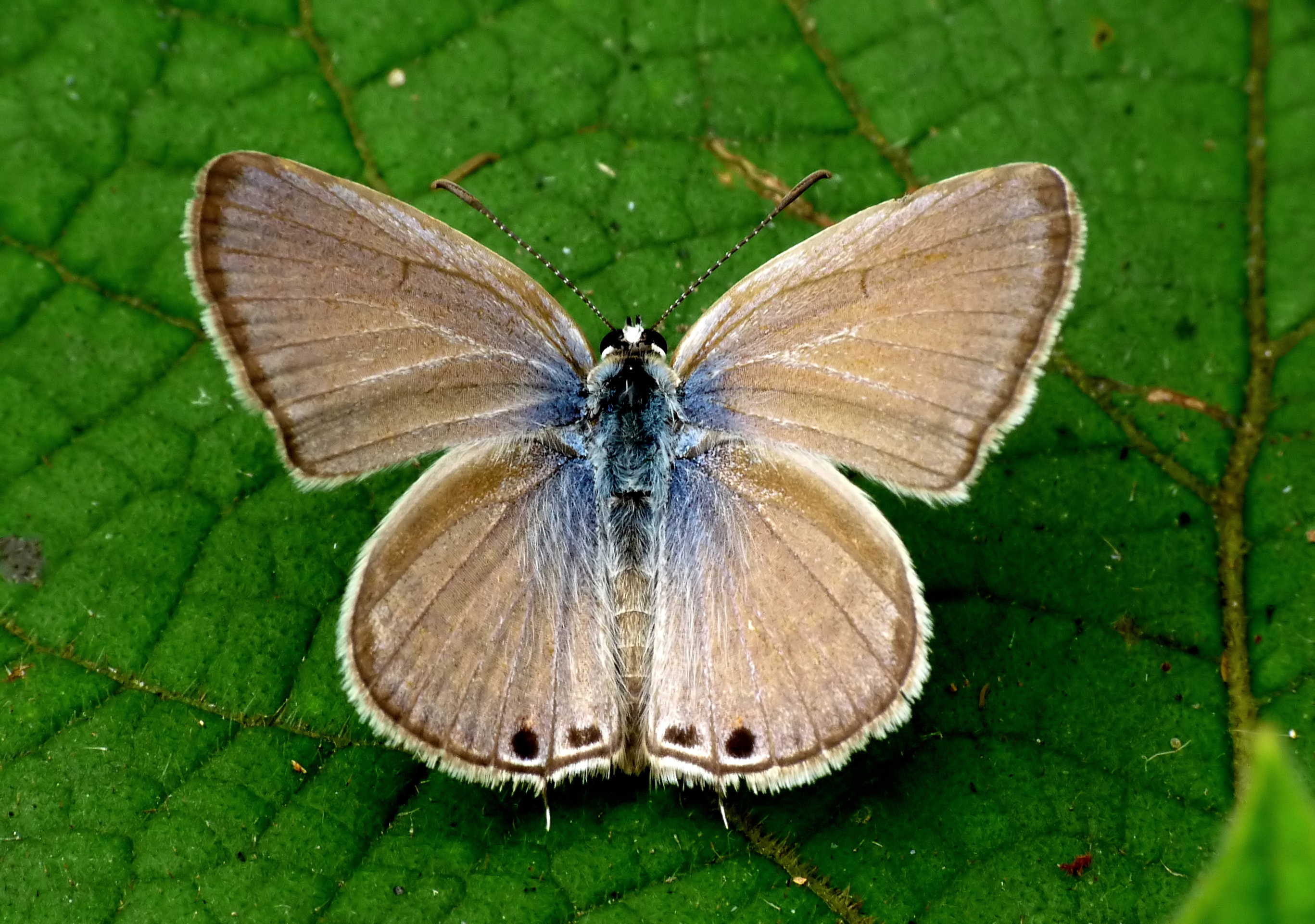
Dorsal view (male)

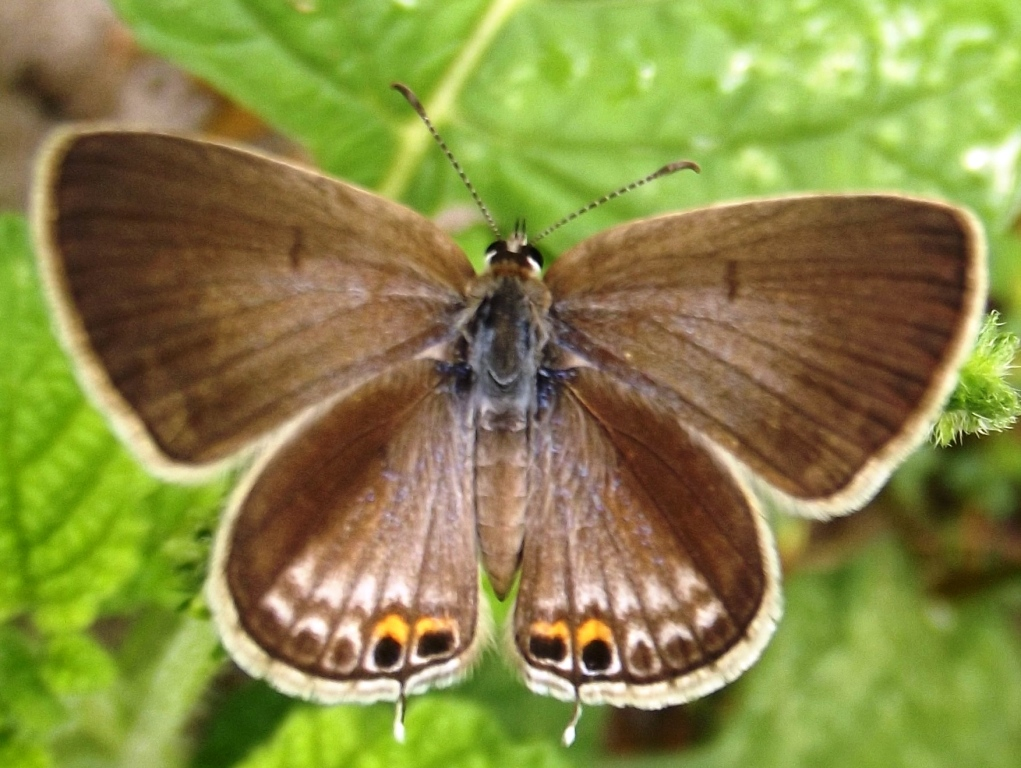
Dorsal view (female)

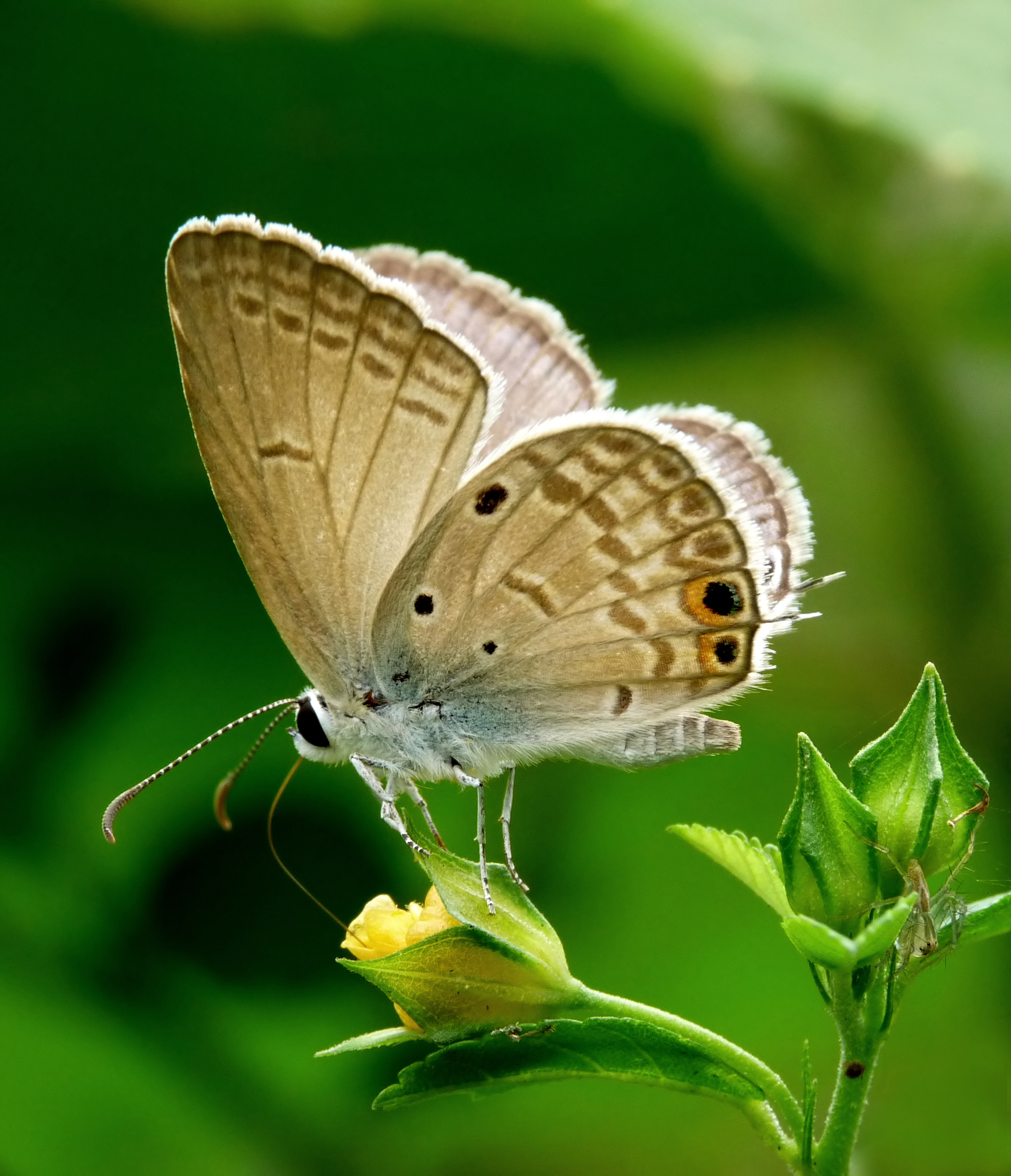
Ventral view

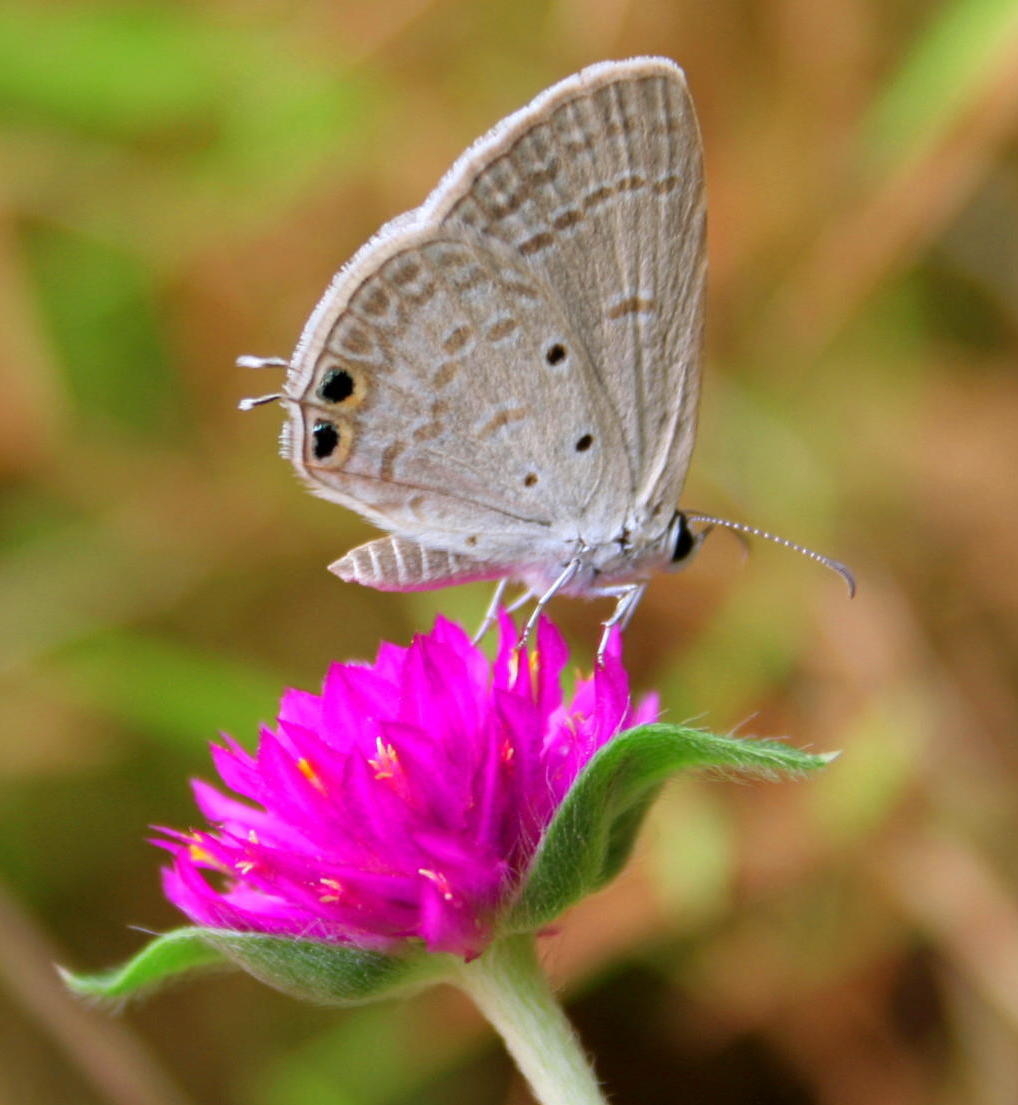
Ventral view

==== Genus: Everes ====
===== Everes lacturnus (Indian cupid) =====
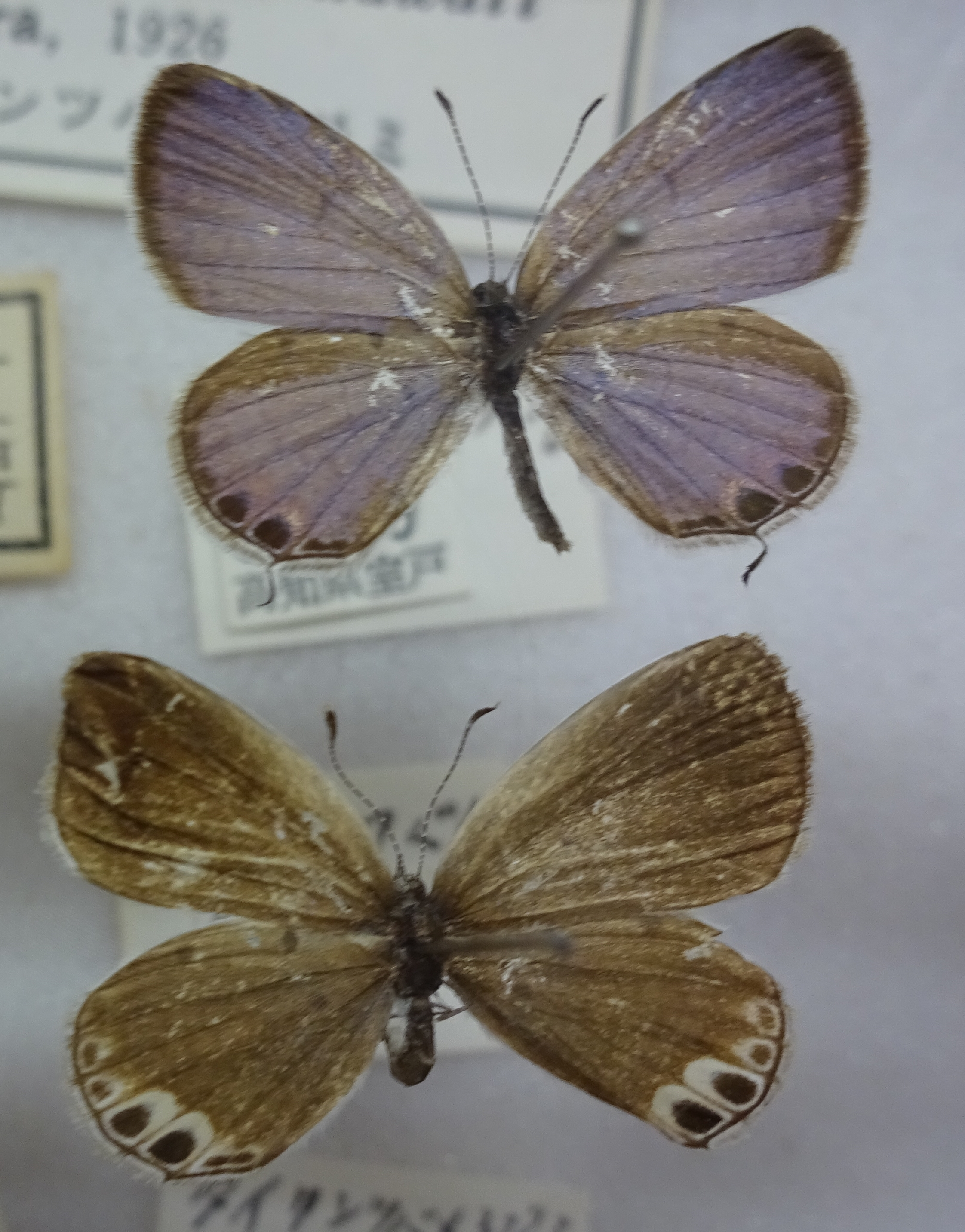
Dorsal view

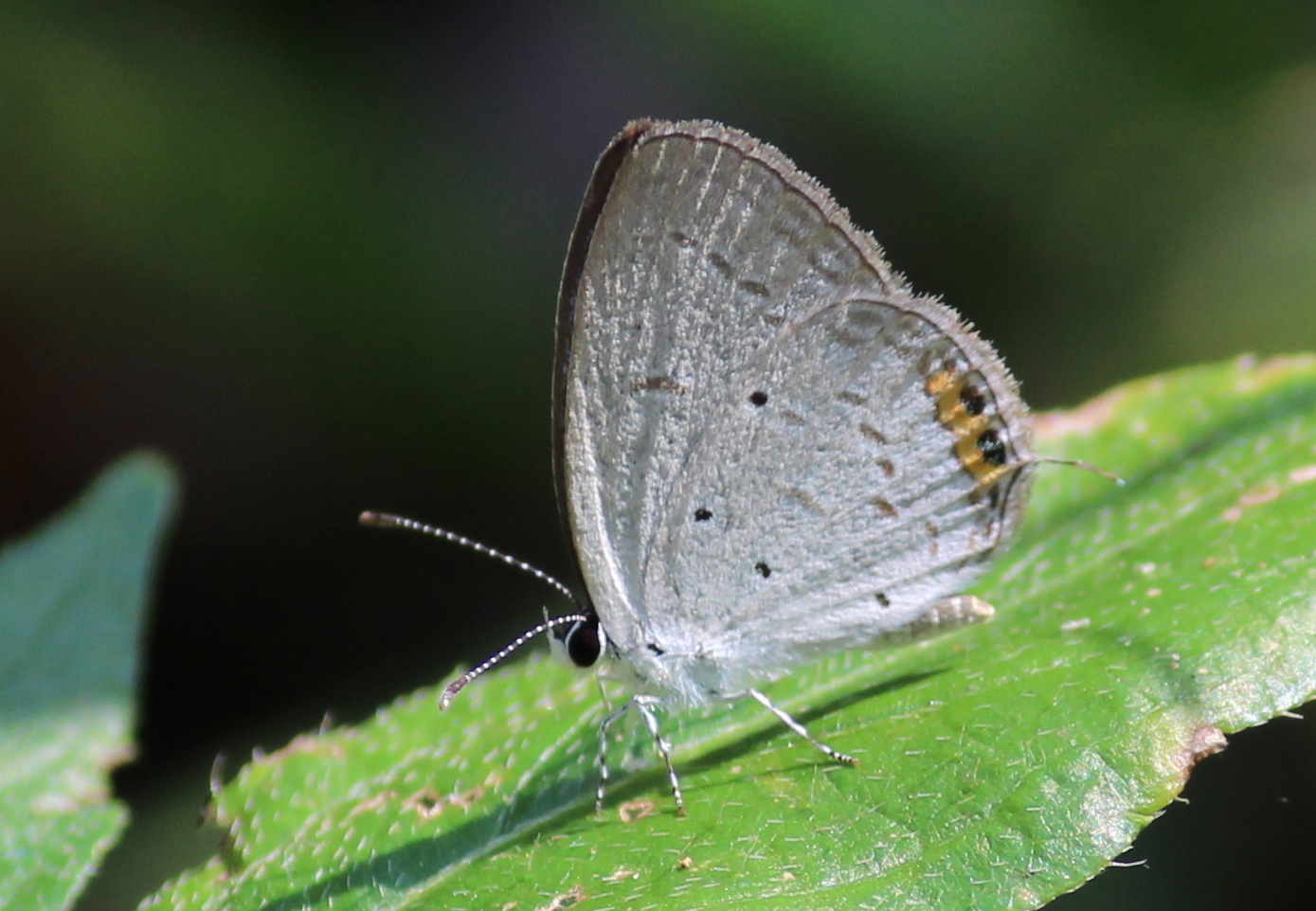
Ventral view

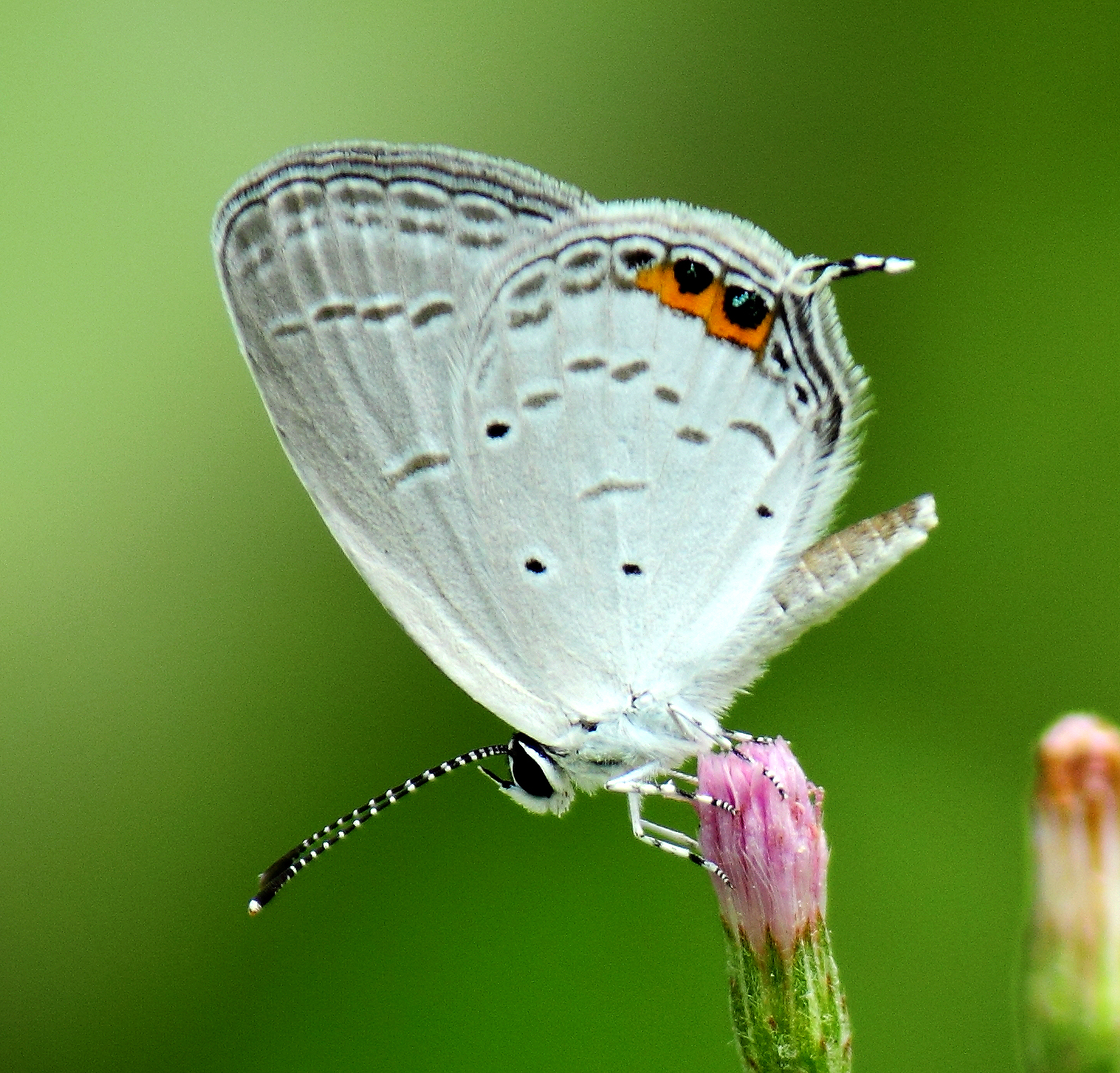
Ventral view

==== Genus: Freyeria ====
===== Freyeria putli (small grass jewel) =====
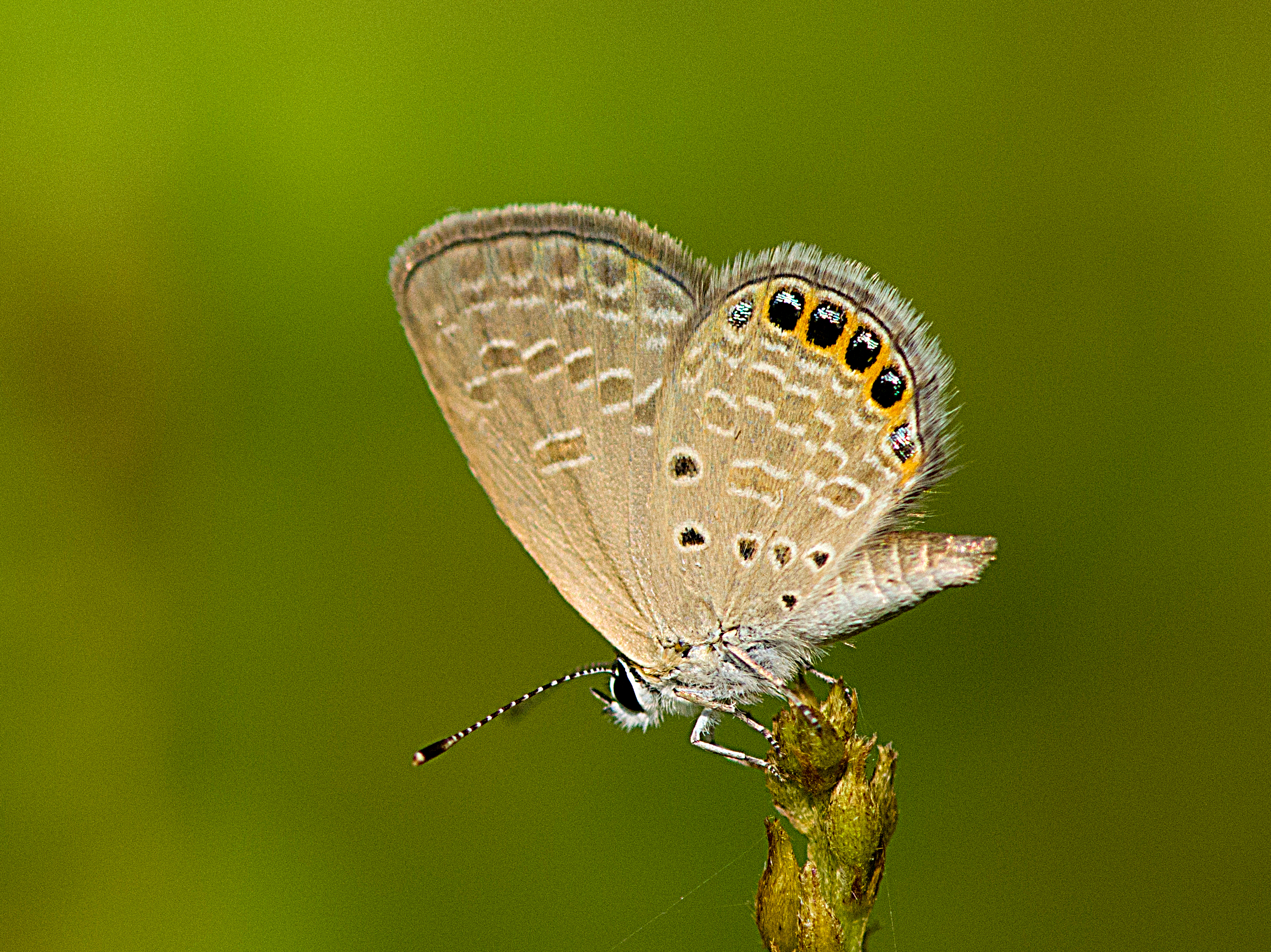
Ventral view

===== Freyeria trochylus (grass jewel) =====
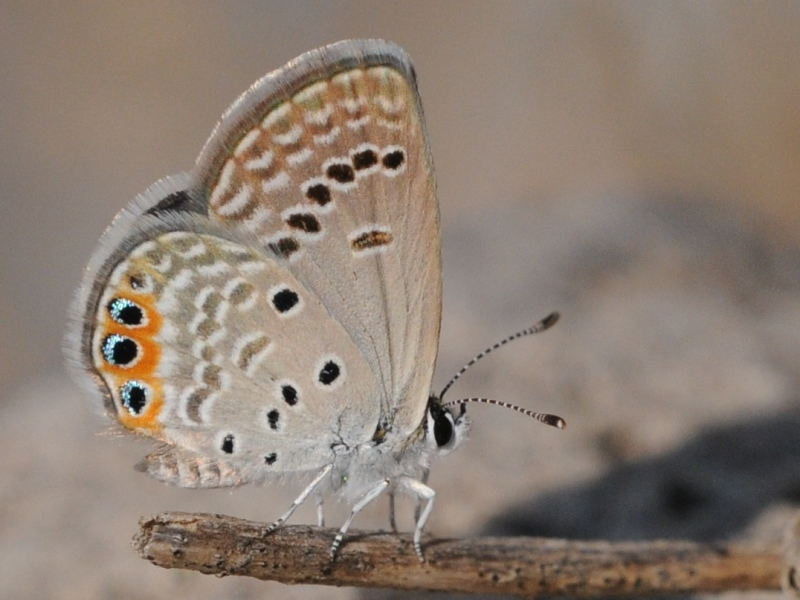
Ventral view

==== Genus: Ionolyce ====
===== Ionolyce helicon (pointed lineblue) =====
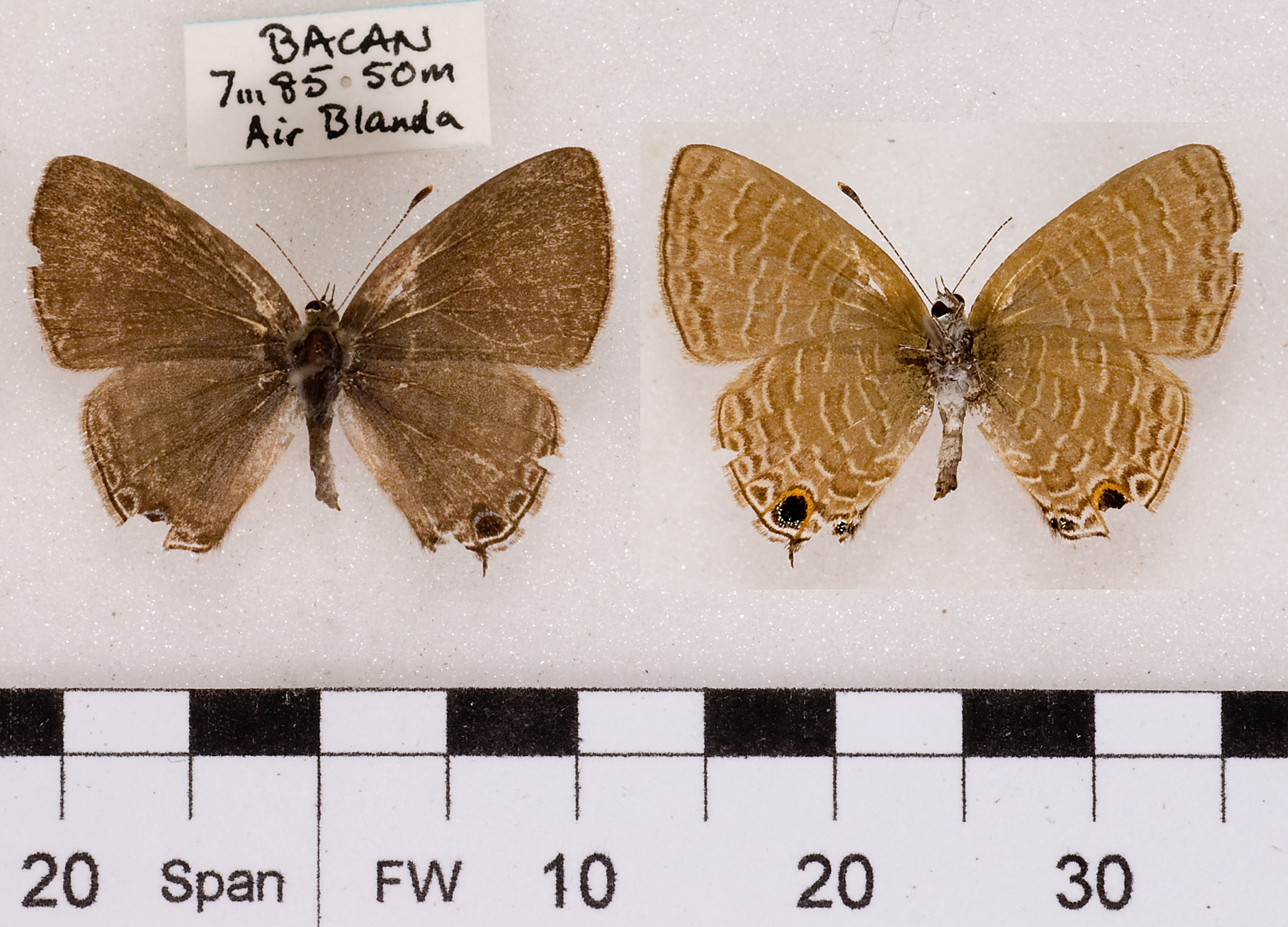
Museum specimen

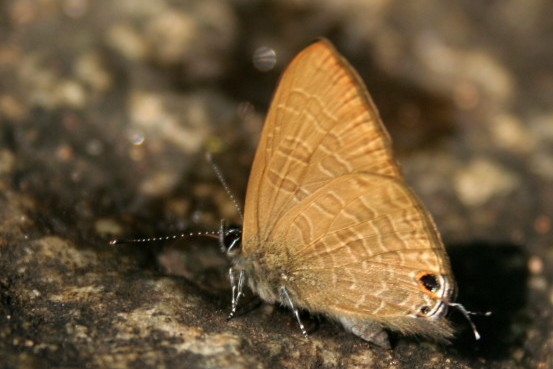
Ventral view

==== Genus: Jamides (ceruleans) ====
===== Jamides alecto (metallic cerulean) =====
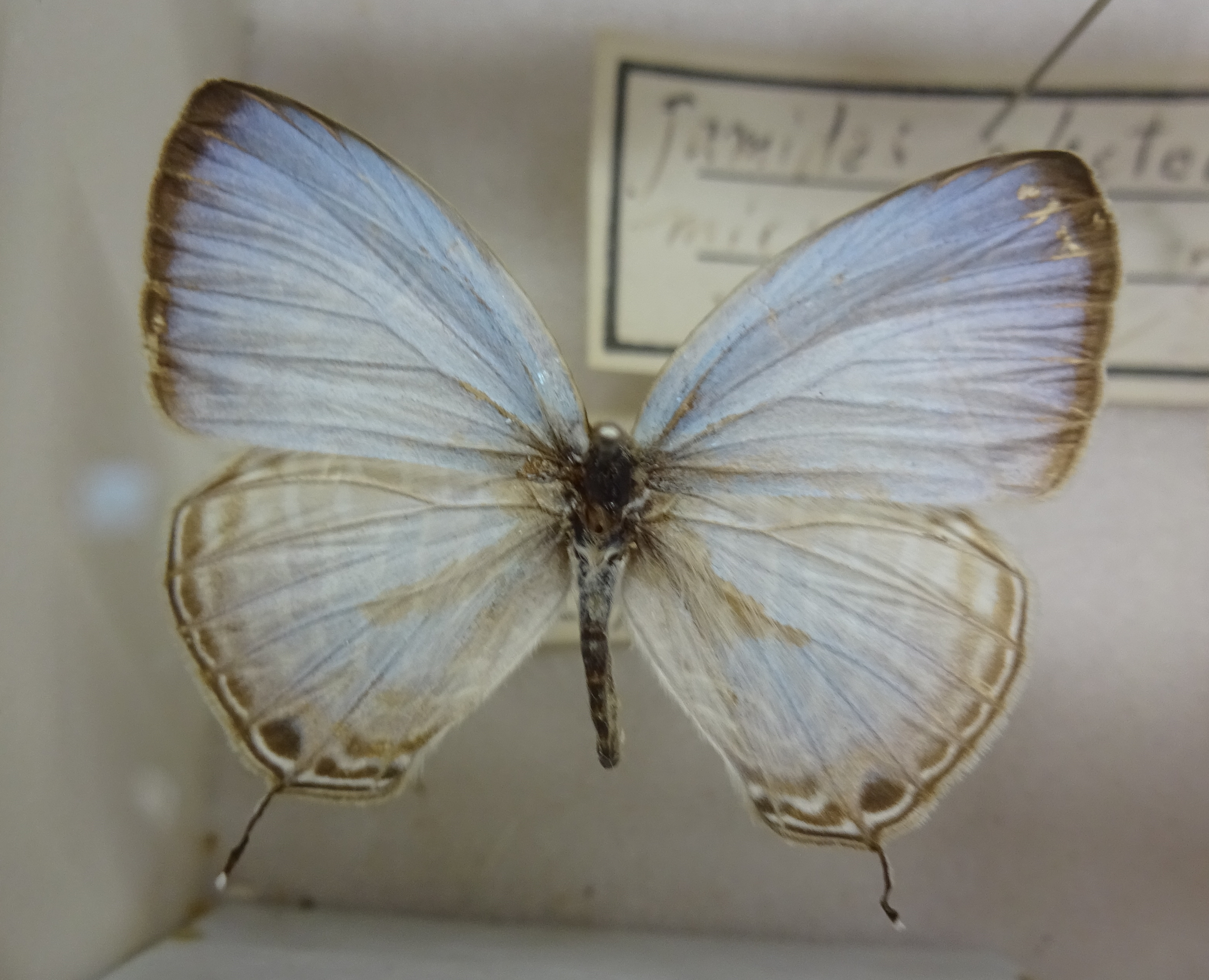
Dorsal view (male)

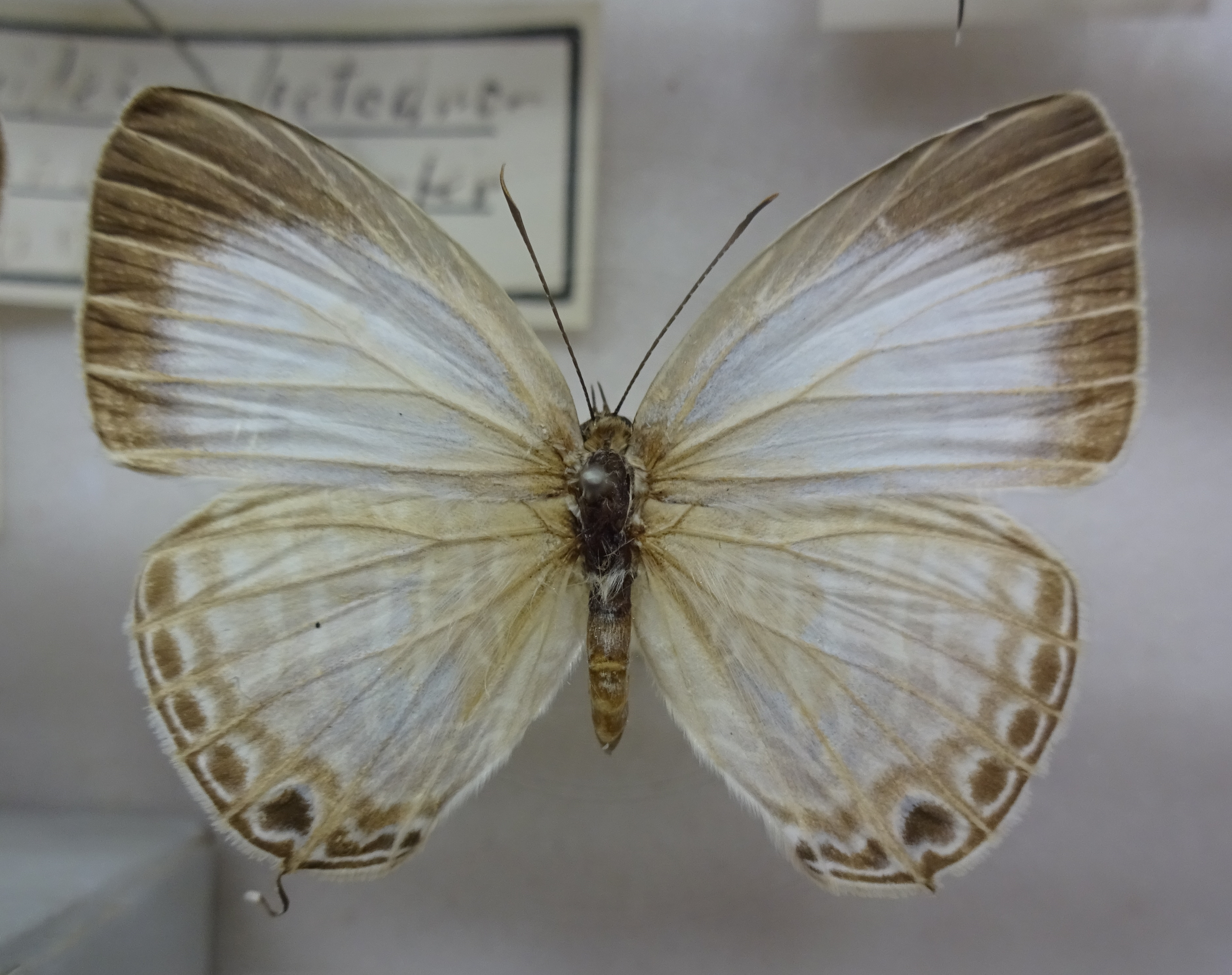
Dorsal view (female)

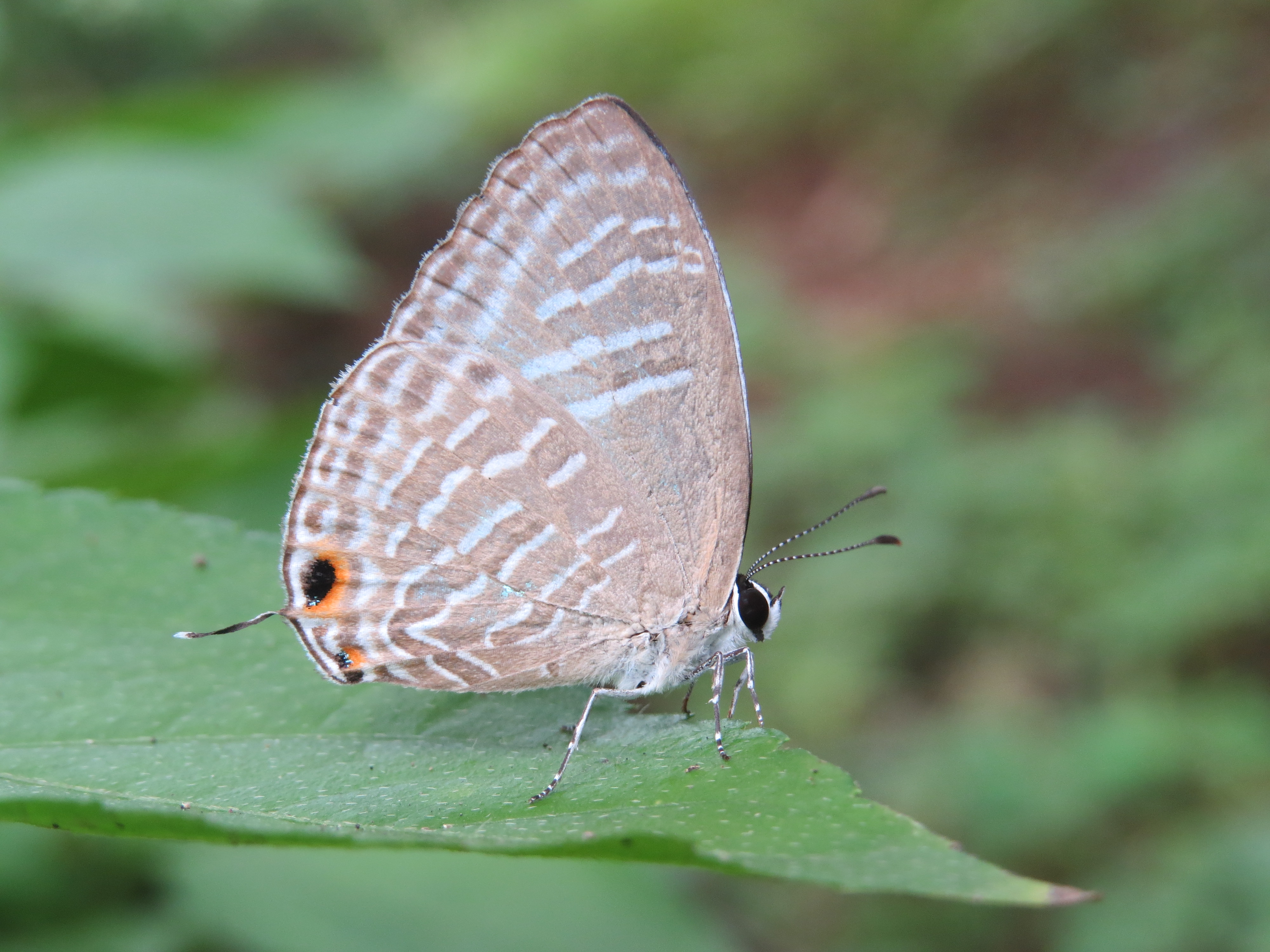
Ventral view

===== Jamides bochus (dark cerulean) =====
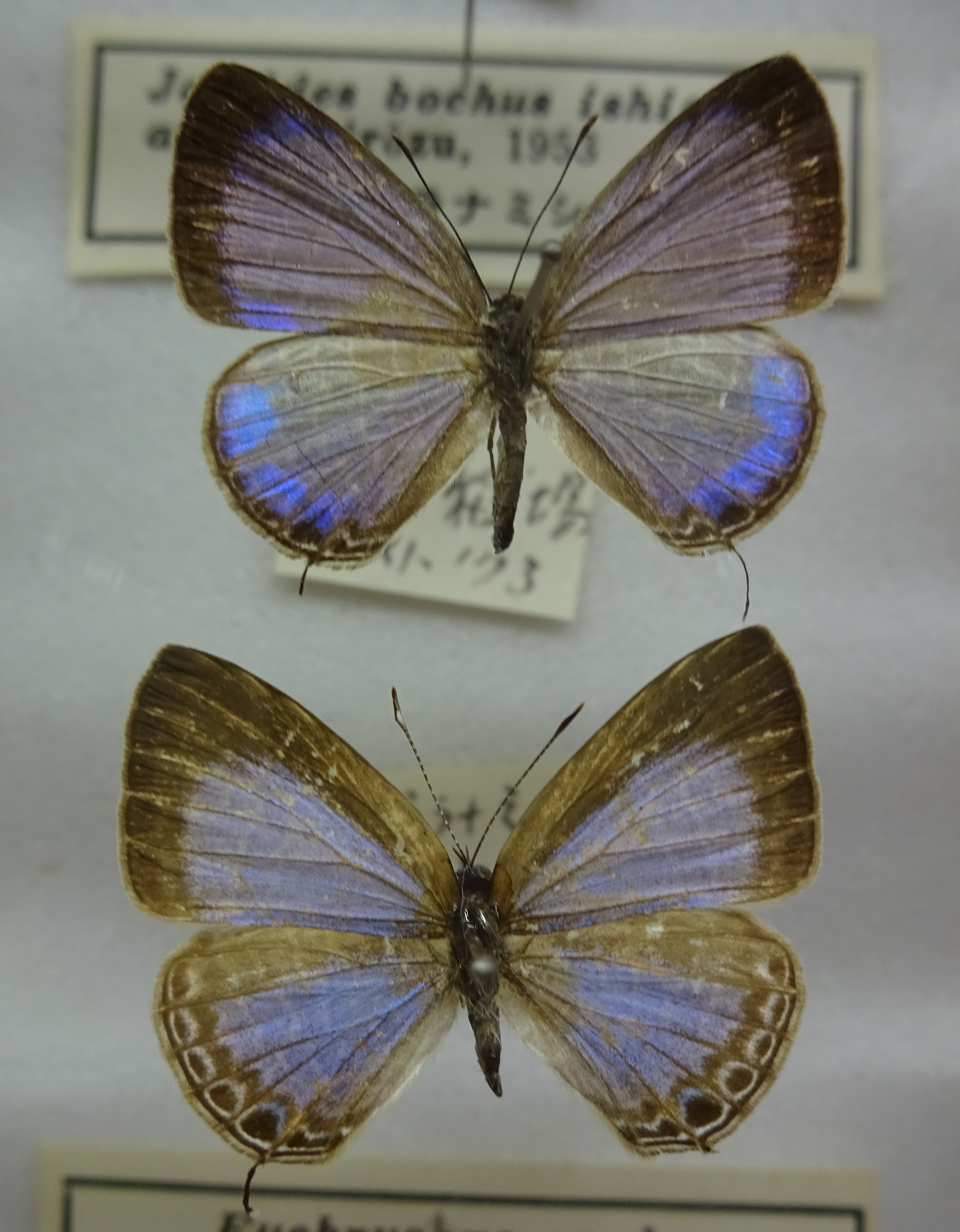
Dorsal view

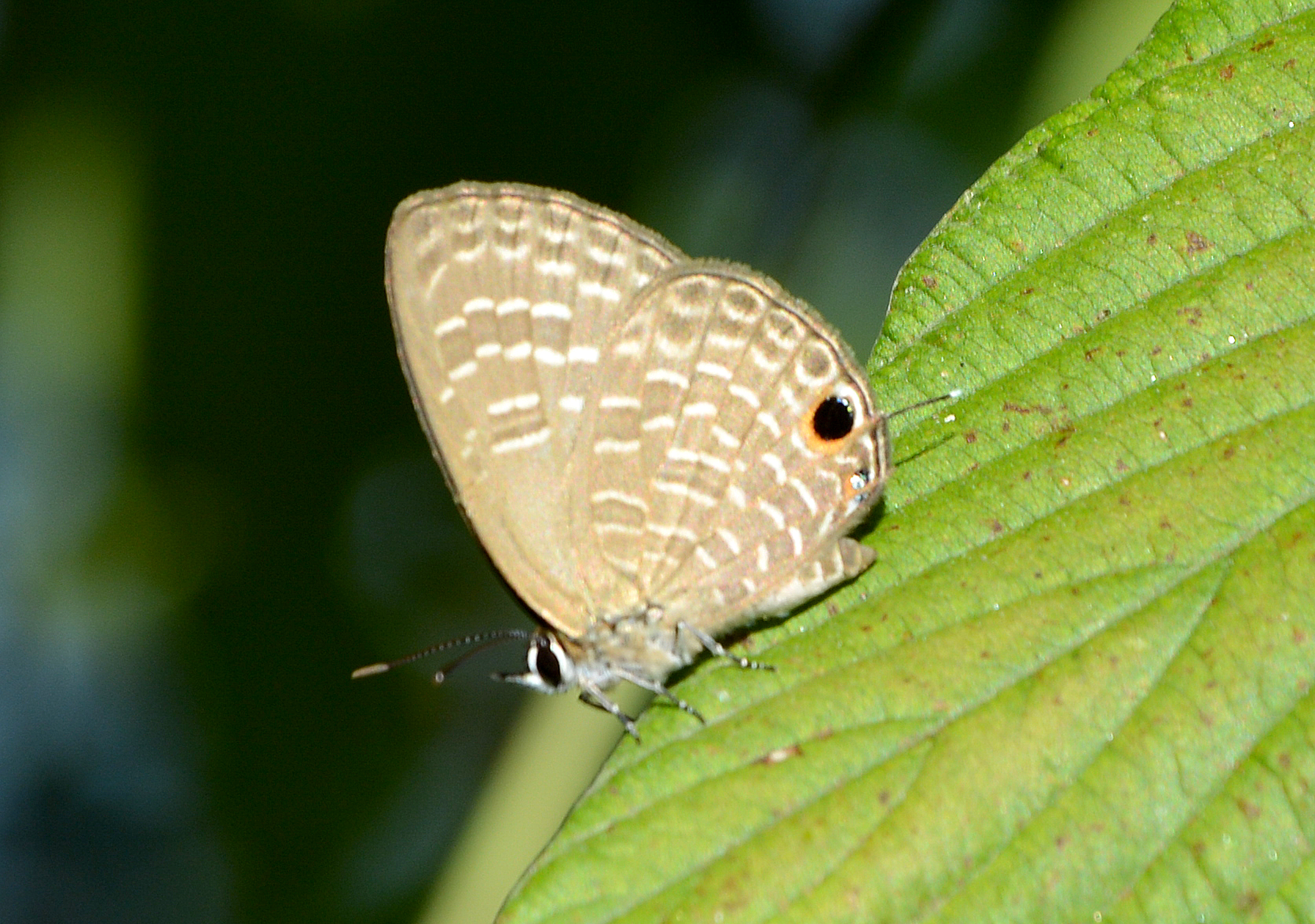
Ventral view

===== Jamides celeno (common cerulean) =====
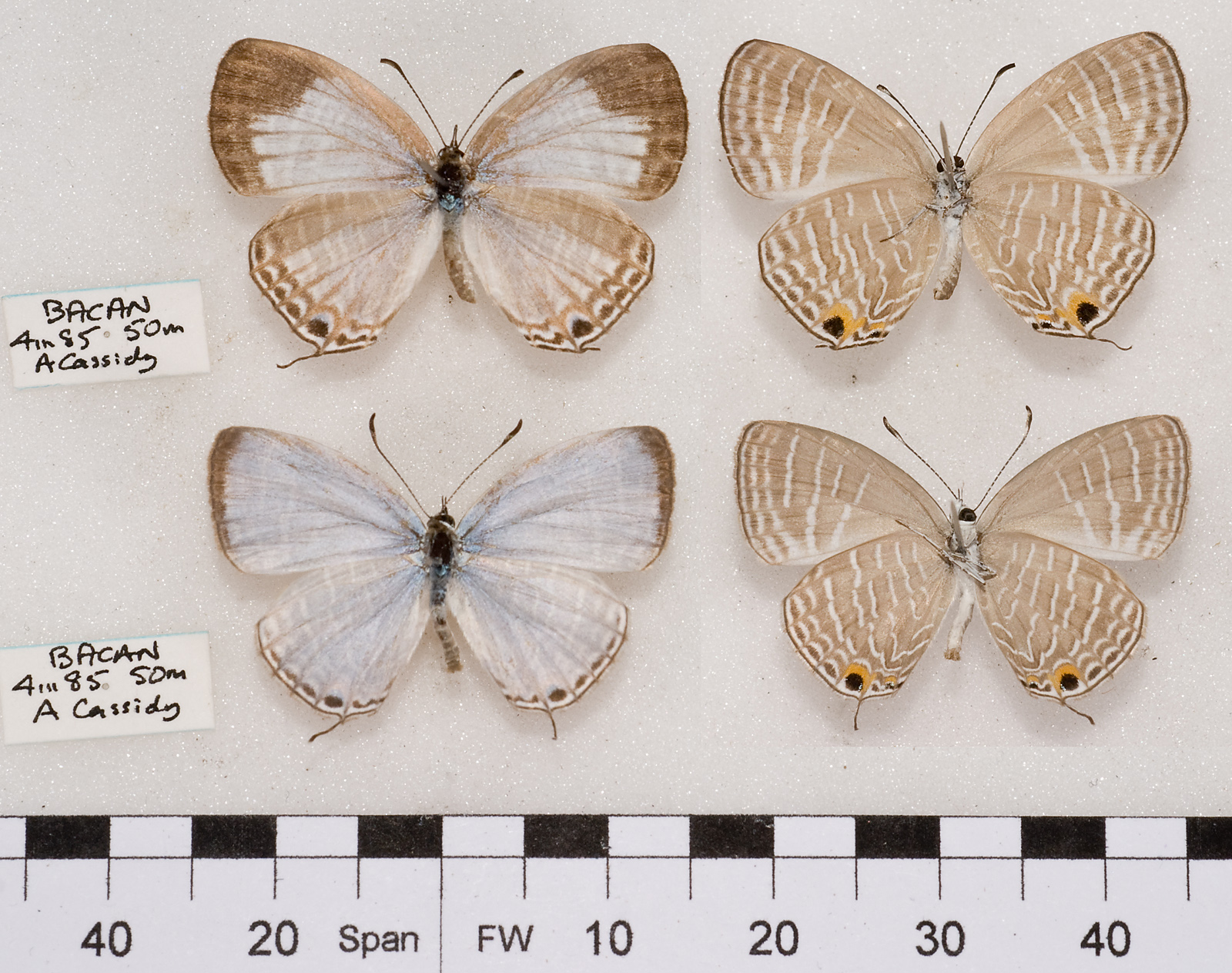
Museum specimens

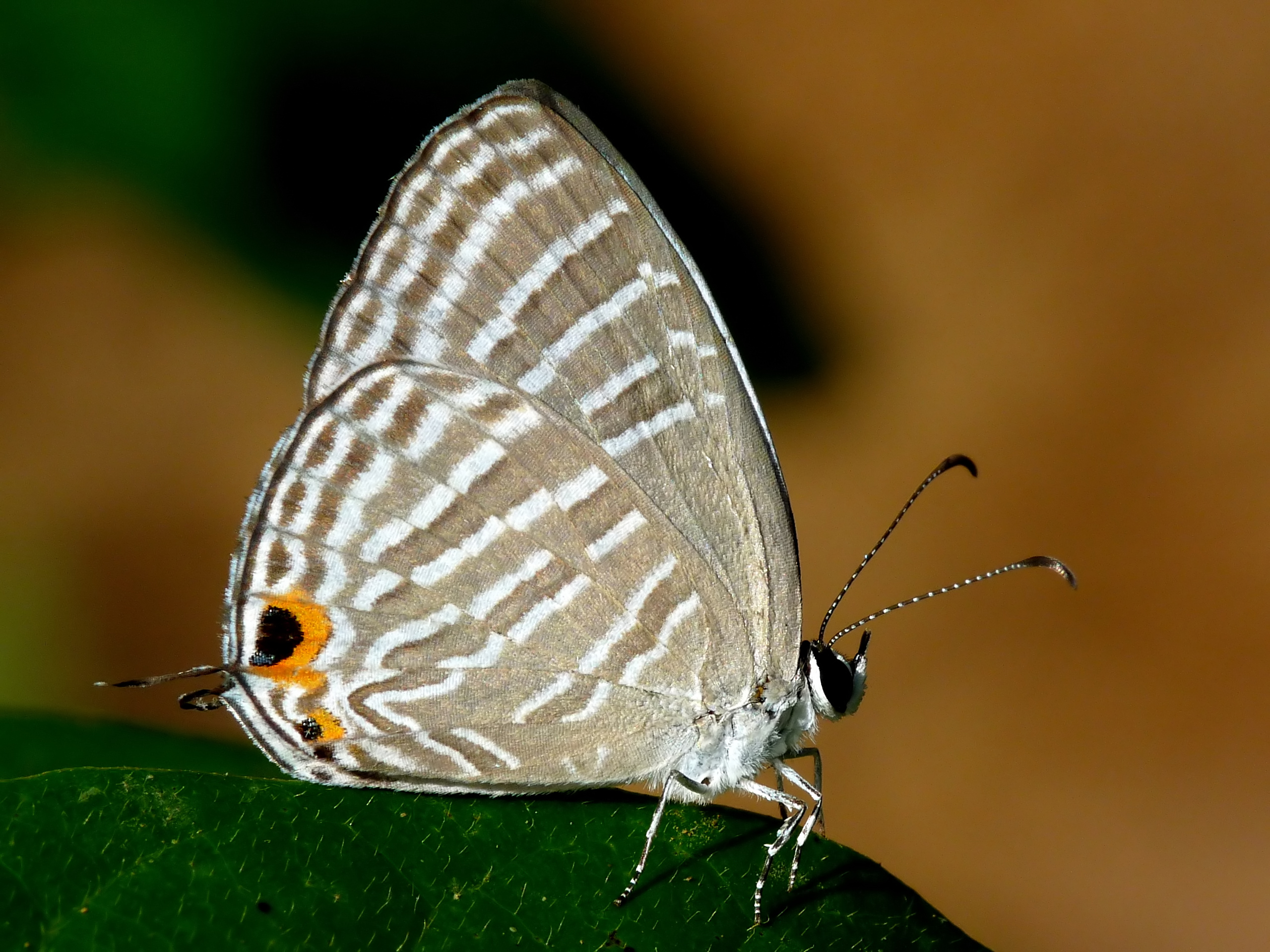
Ventral view (wet-season form)

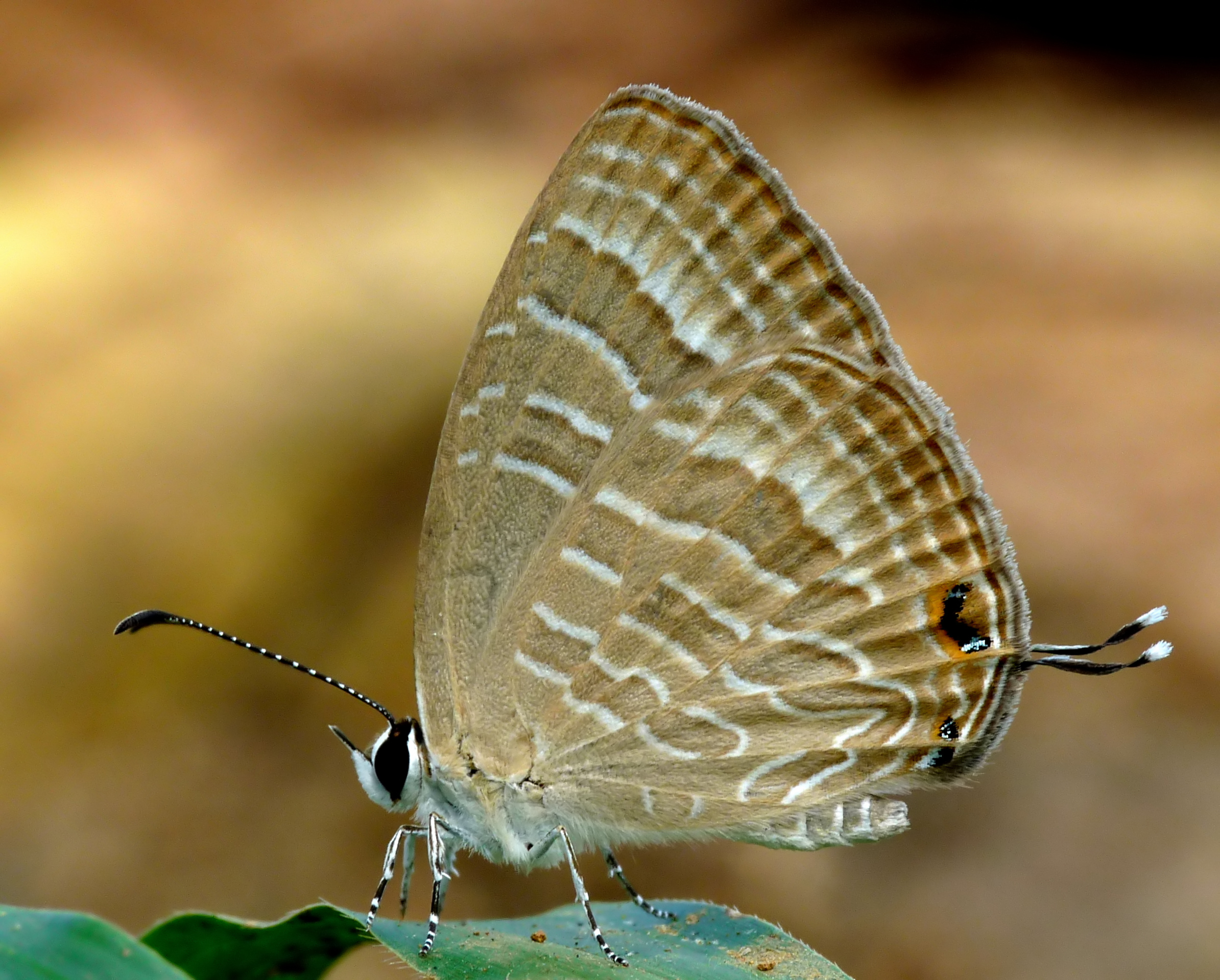
Ventral view (dry-season form)

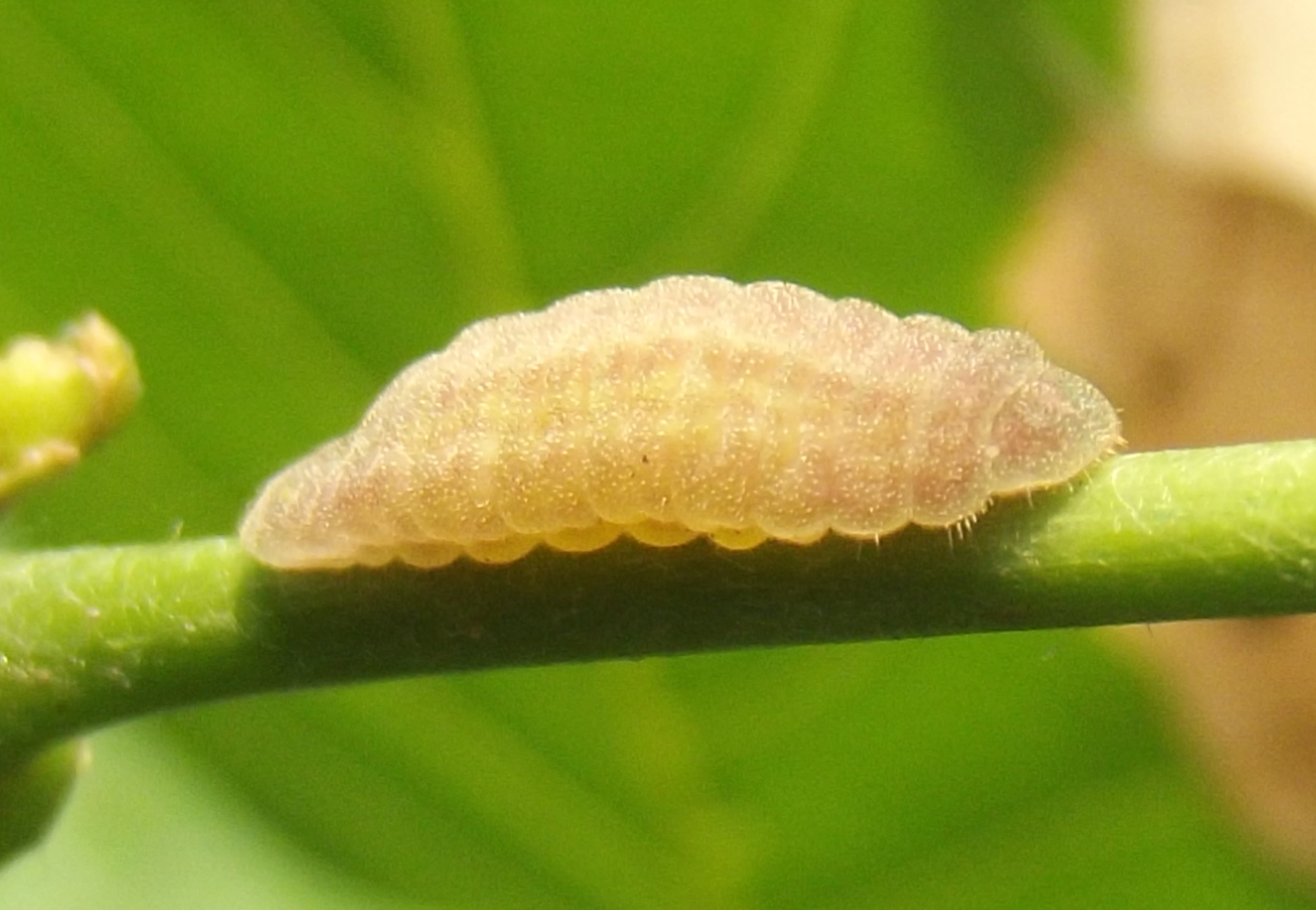
Larva

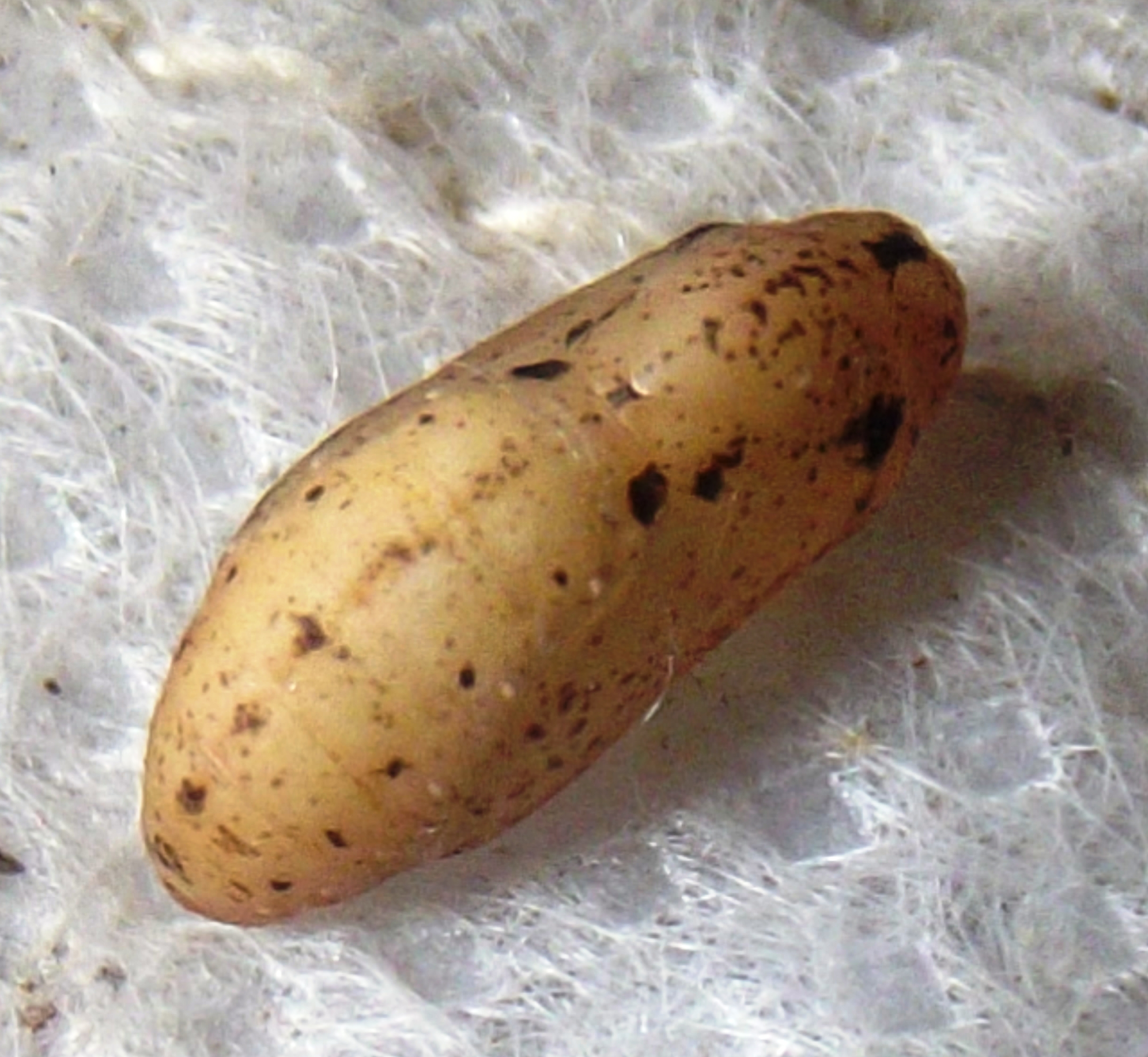
Pupa

==== Genus: Lampides ====
===== Lampides boeticus (peablue) =====
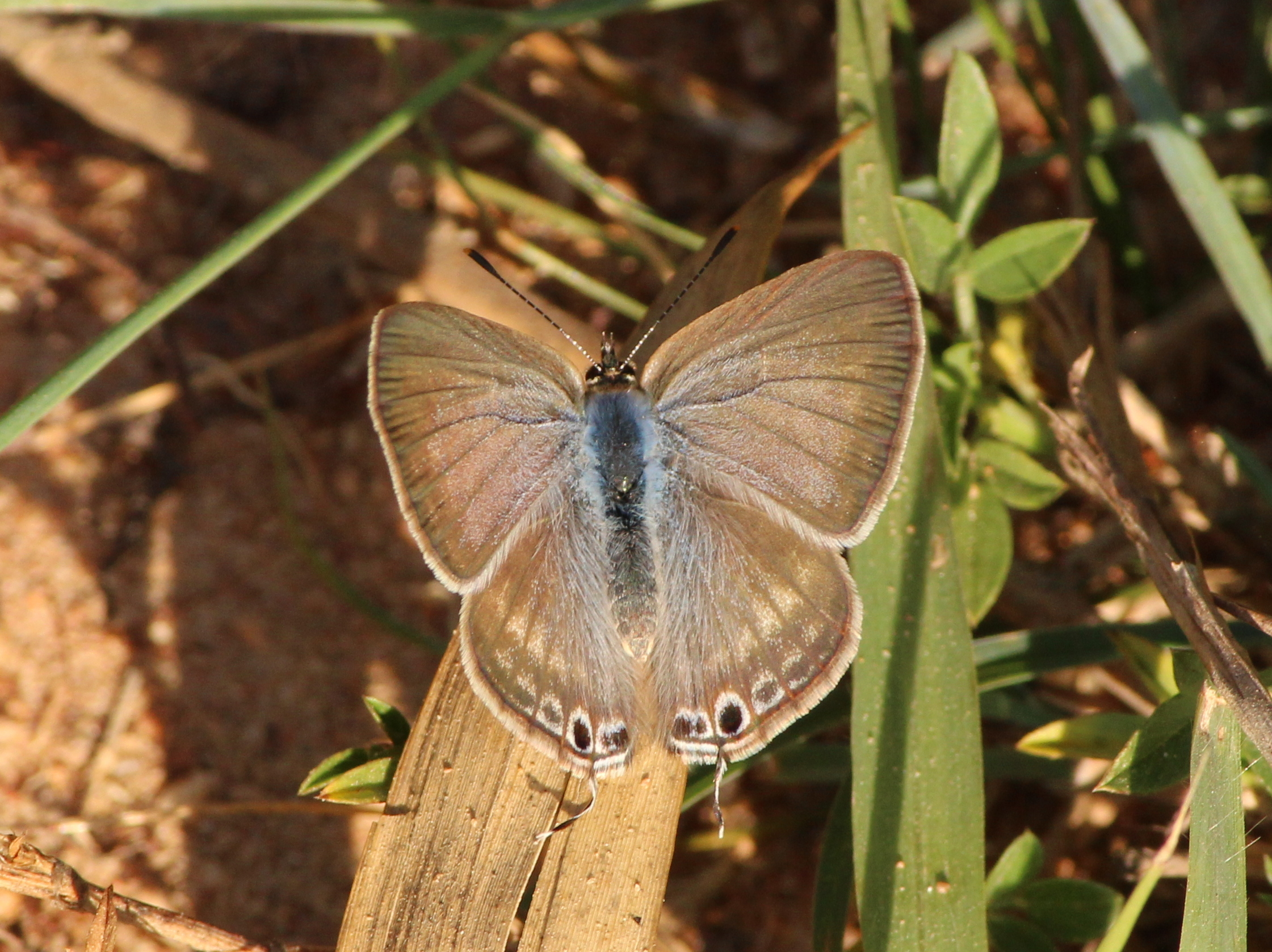
Dorsal view

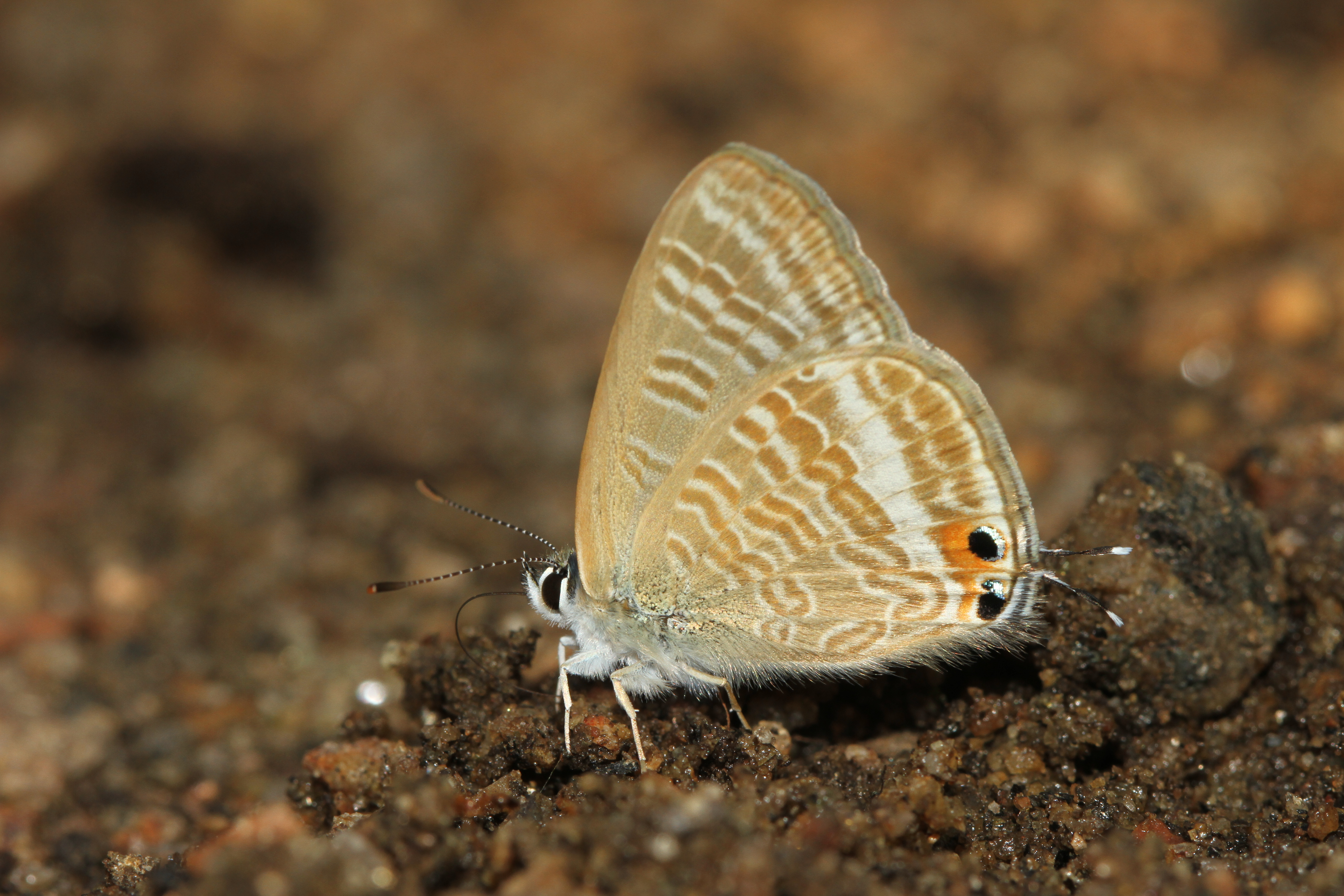
Ventral view

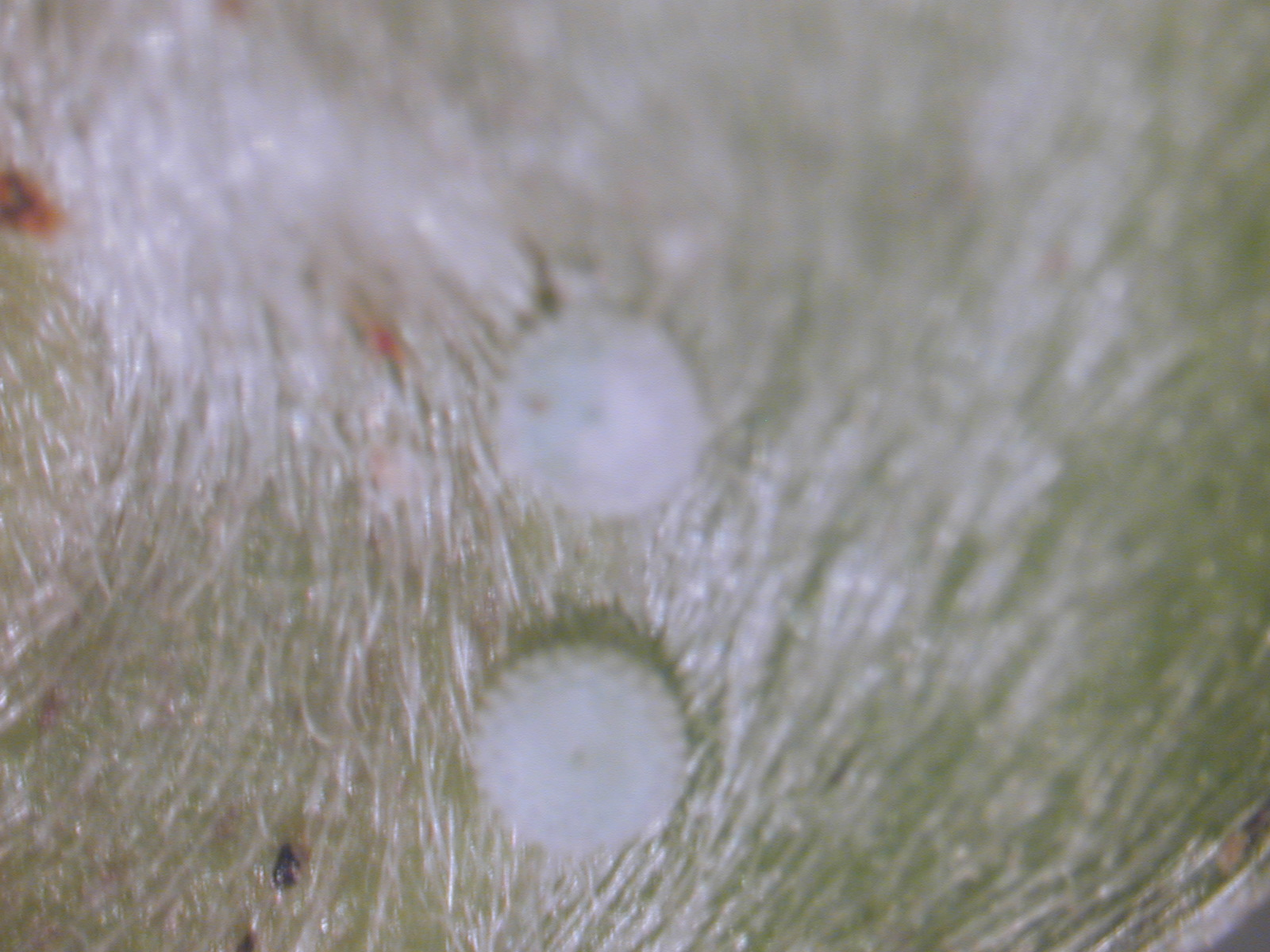
Egg

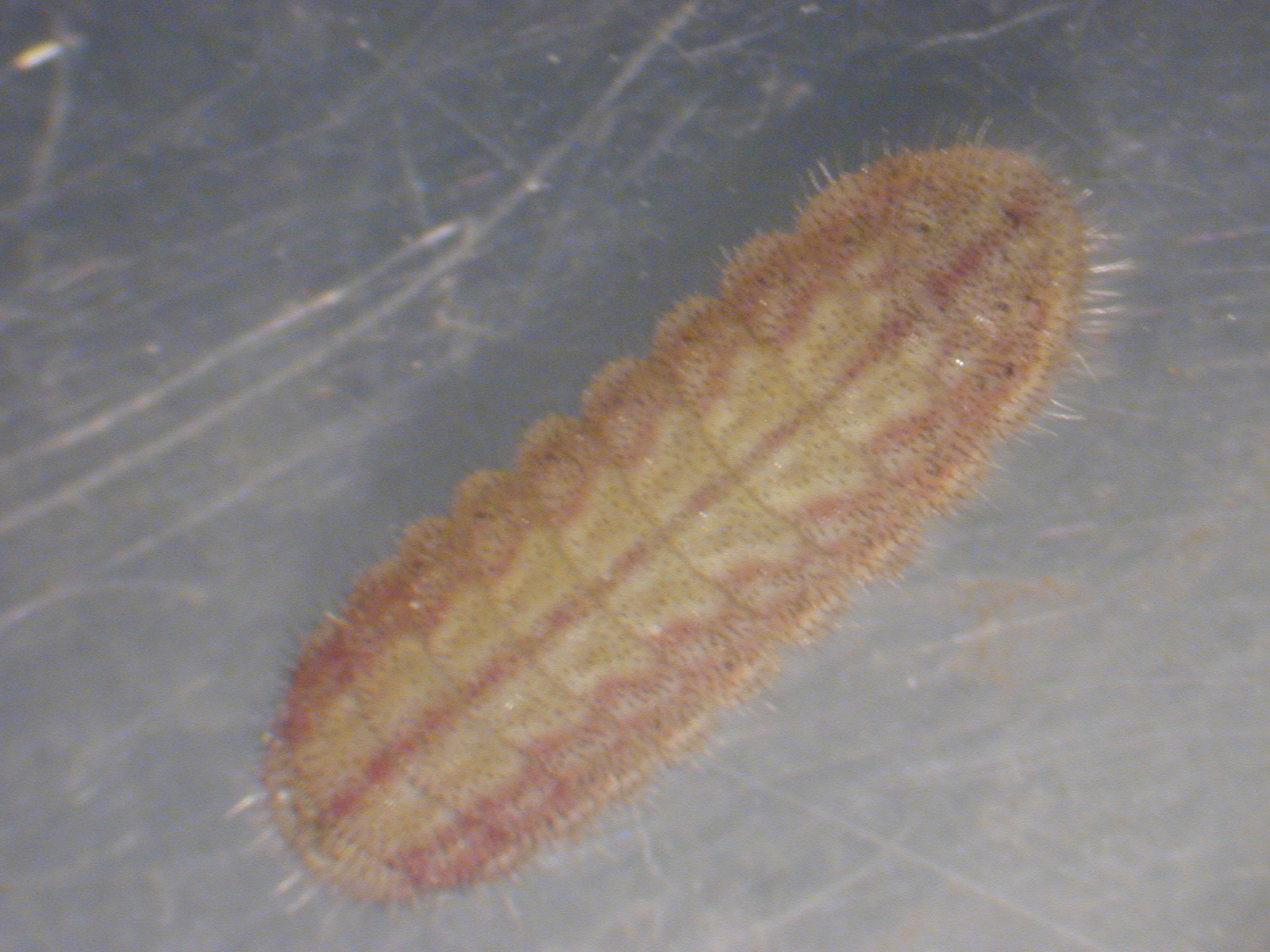
Larva

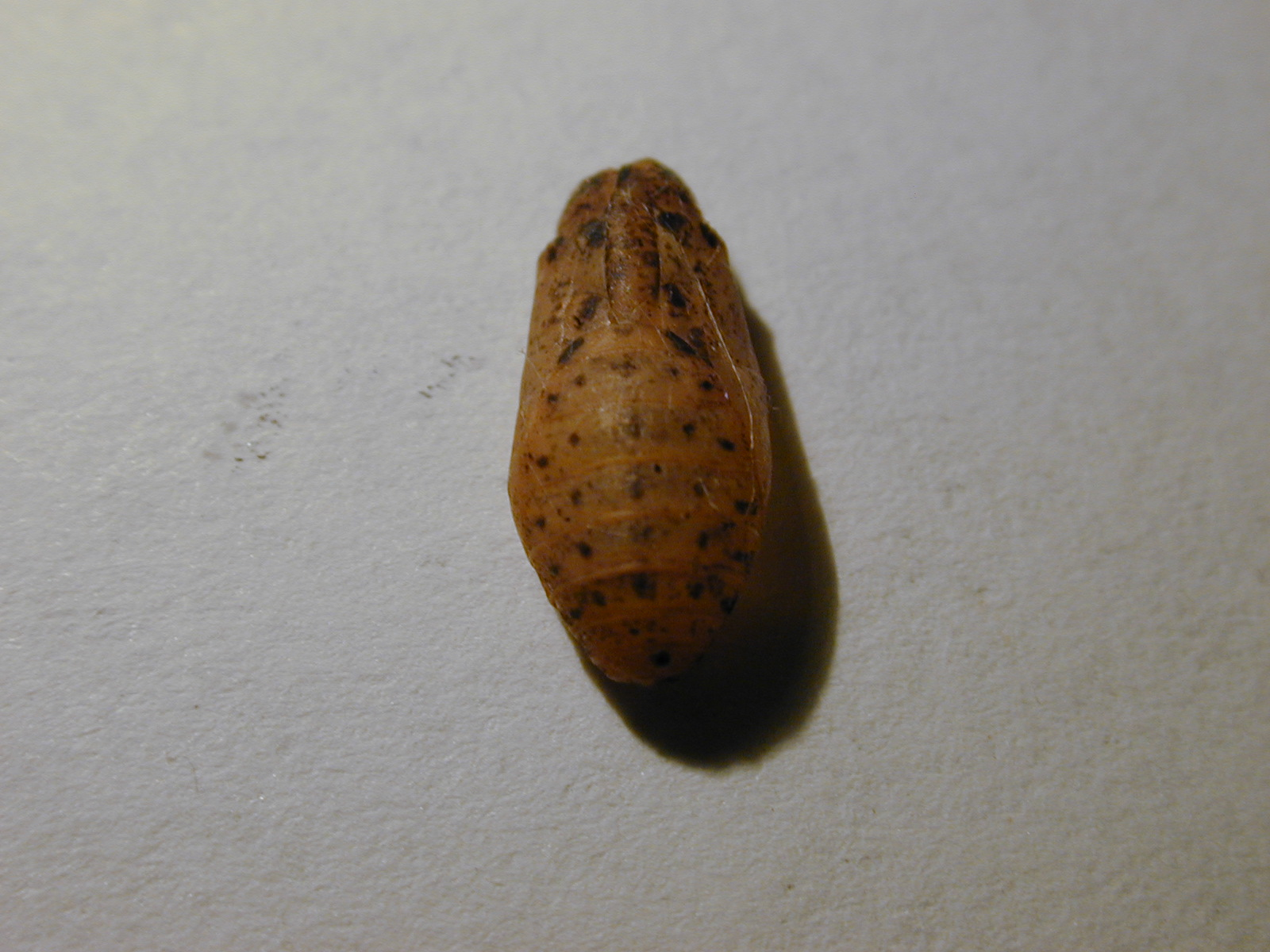
Pupa

==== Genus: Leptotes ====
===== Leptotes plinius (zebra blue) =====
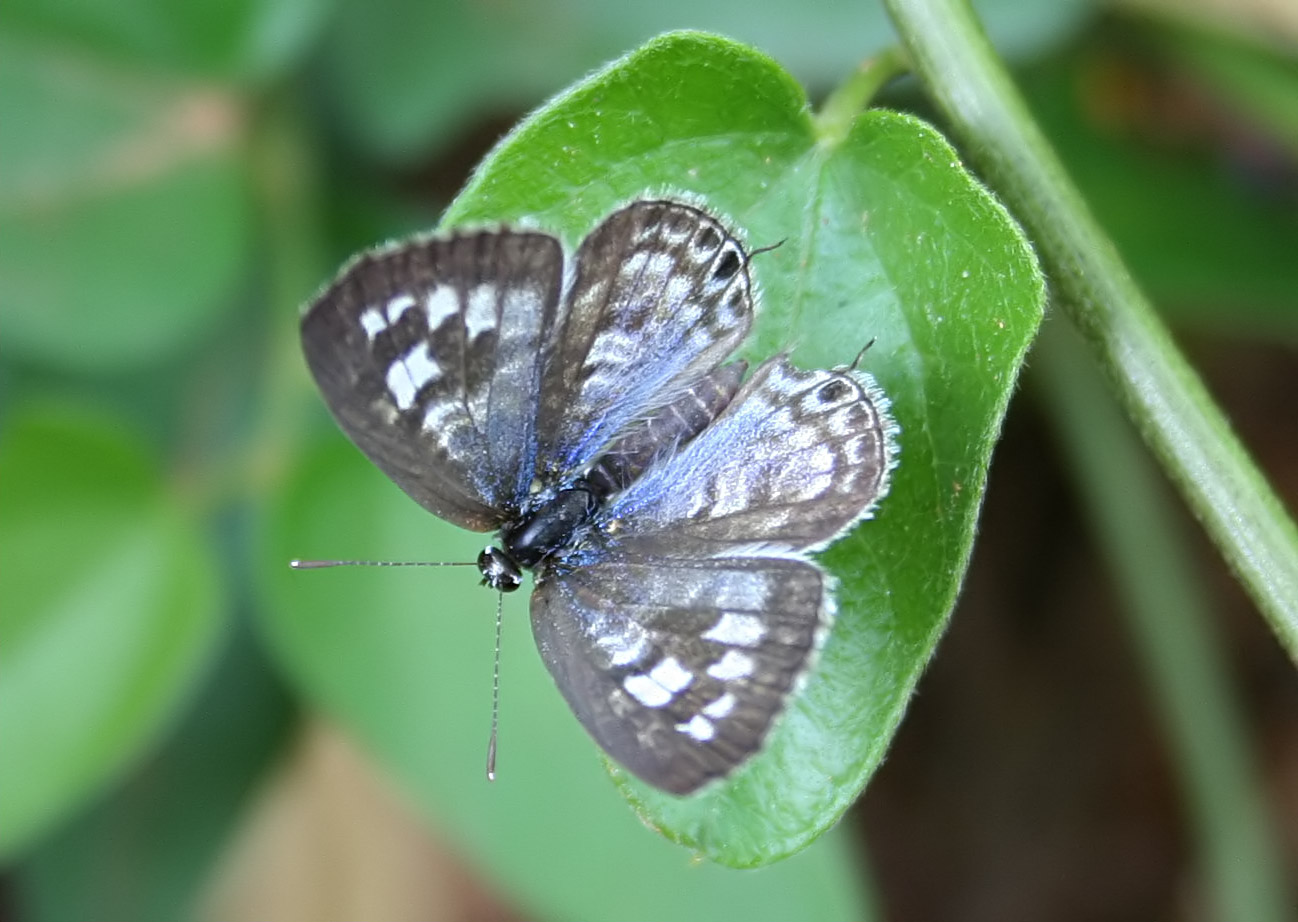
Dorsal view (male)

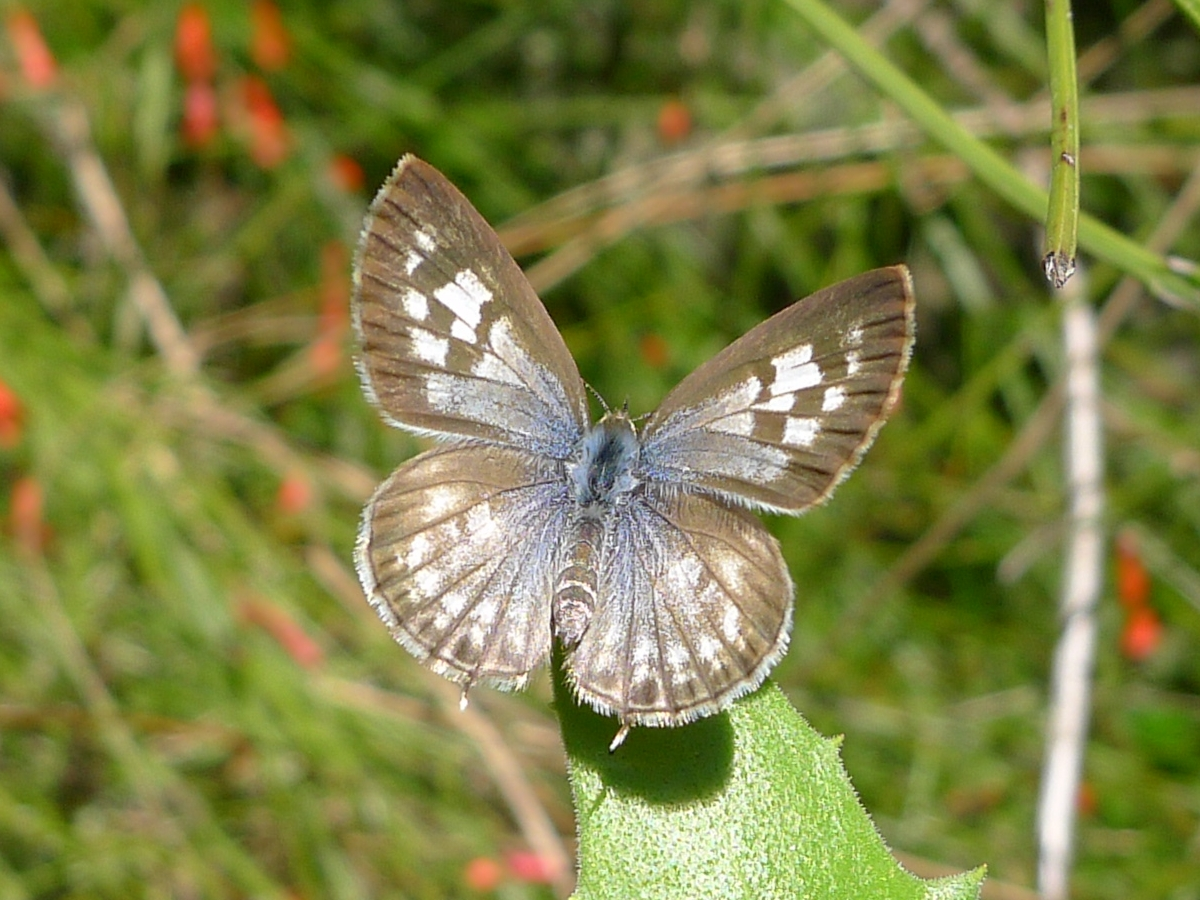
Dorsal view (female)

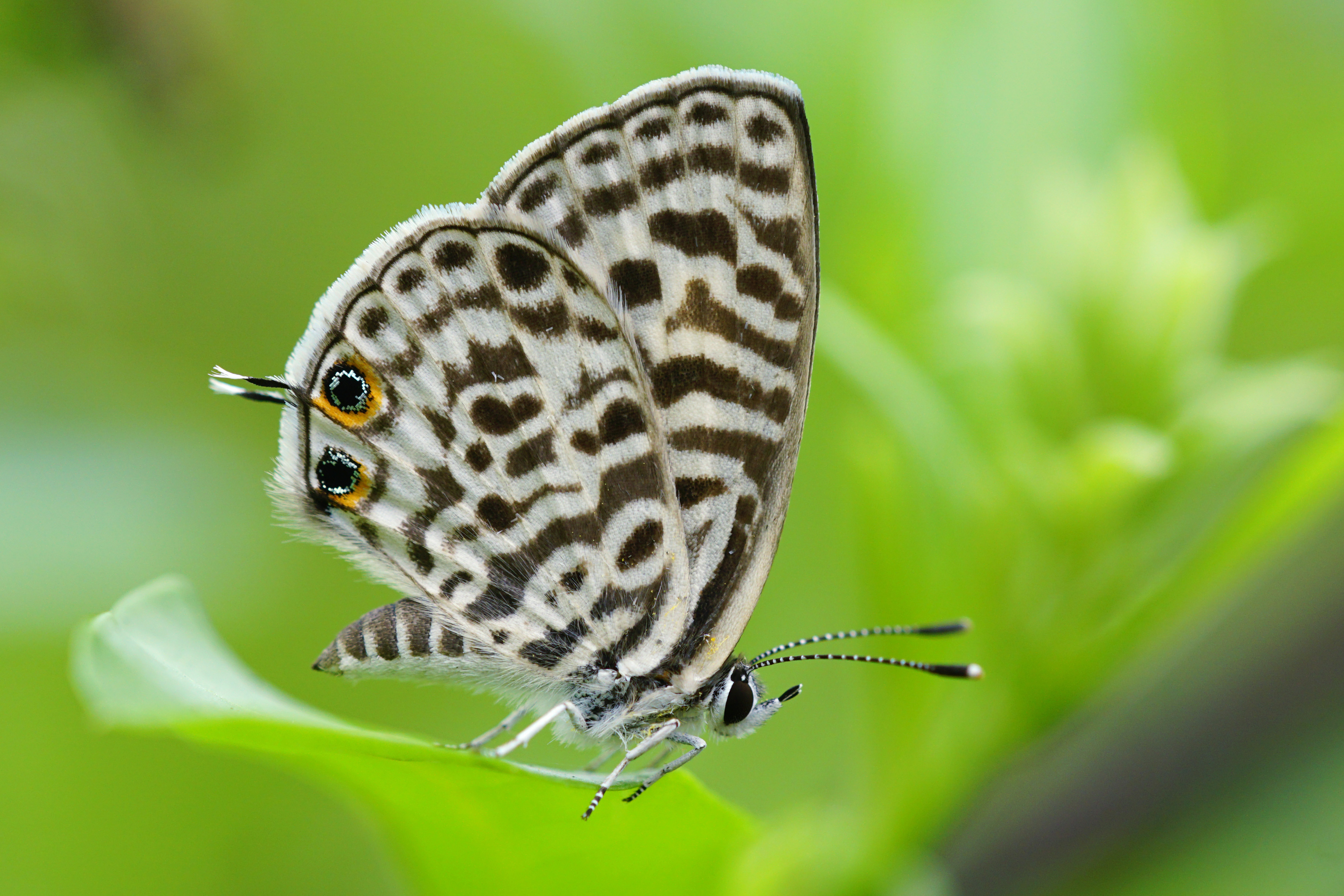
Ventral view

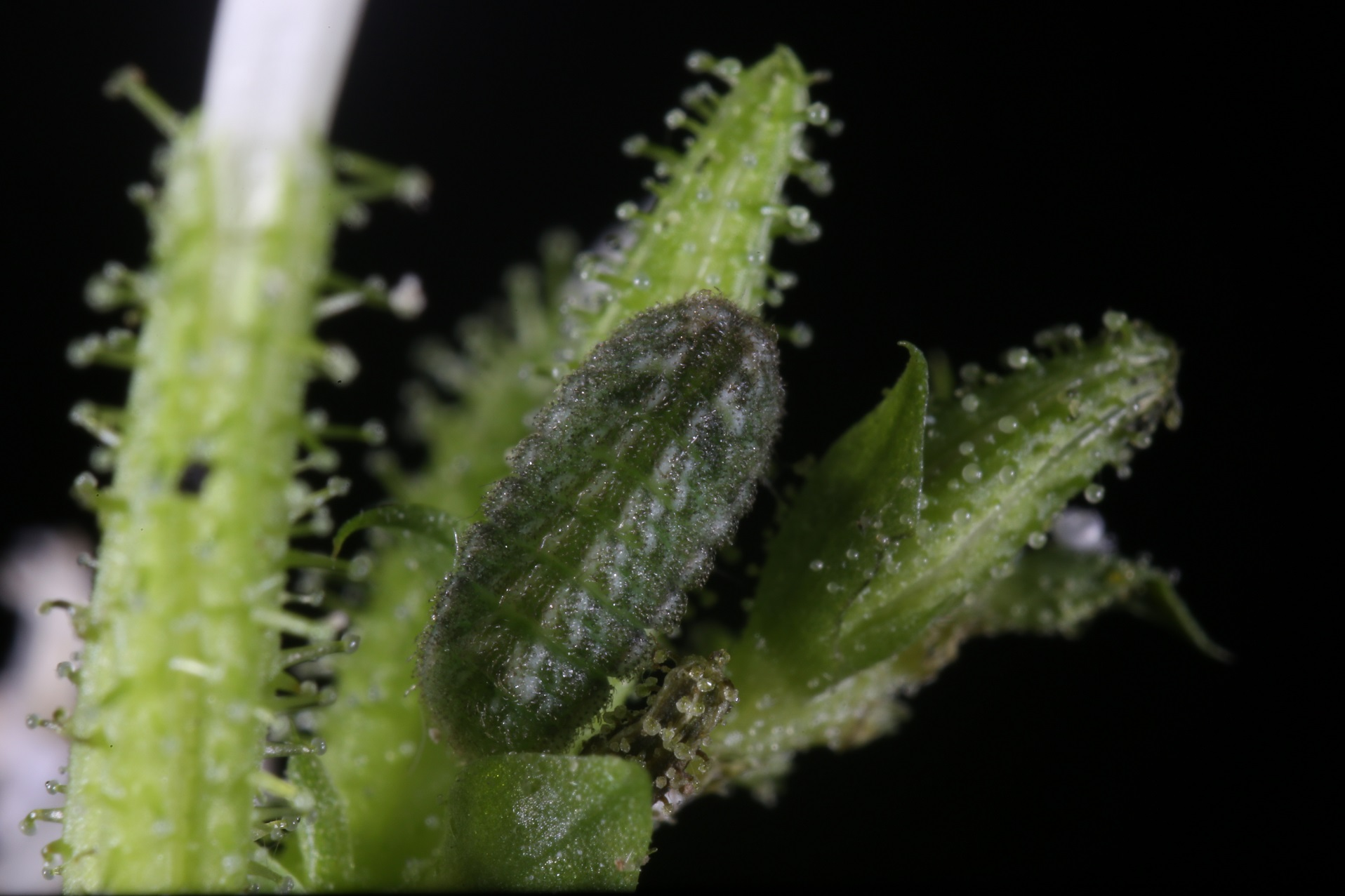
Larva

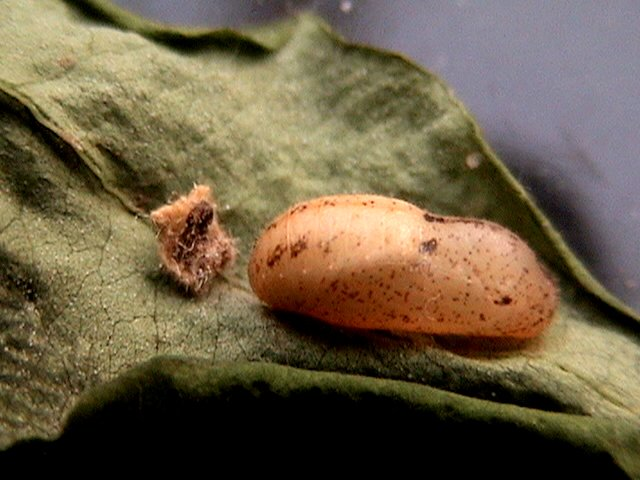
Pupa

==== Genus: Luthrodes ====
===== Luthrodes pandava (plains cupid) =====
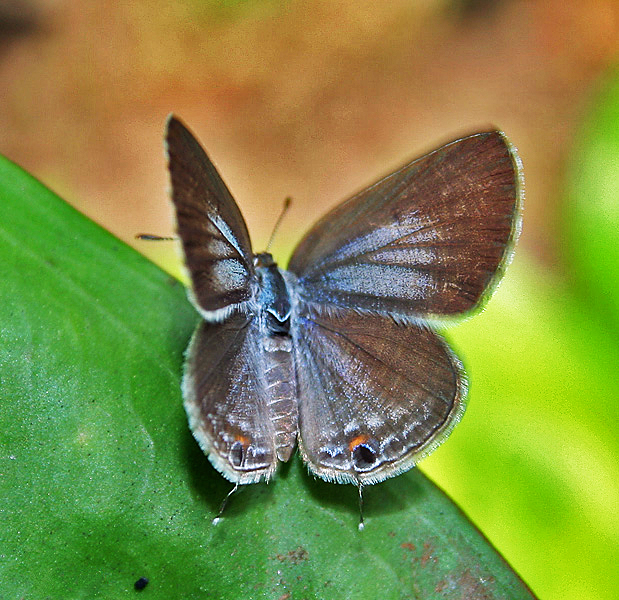
Dorsal view

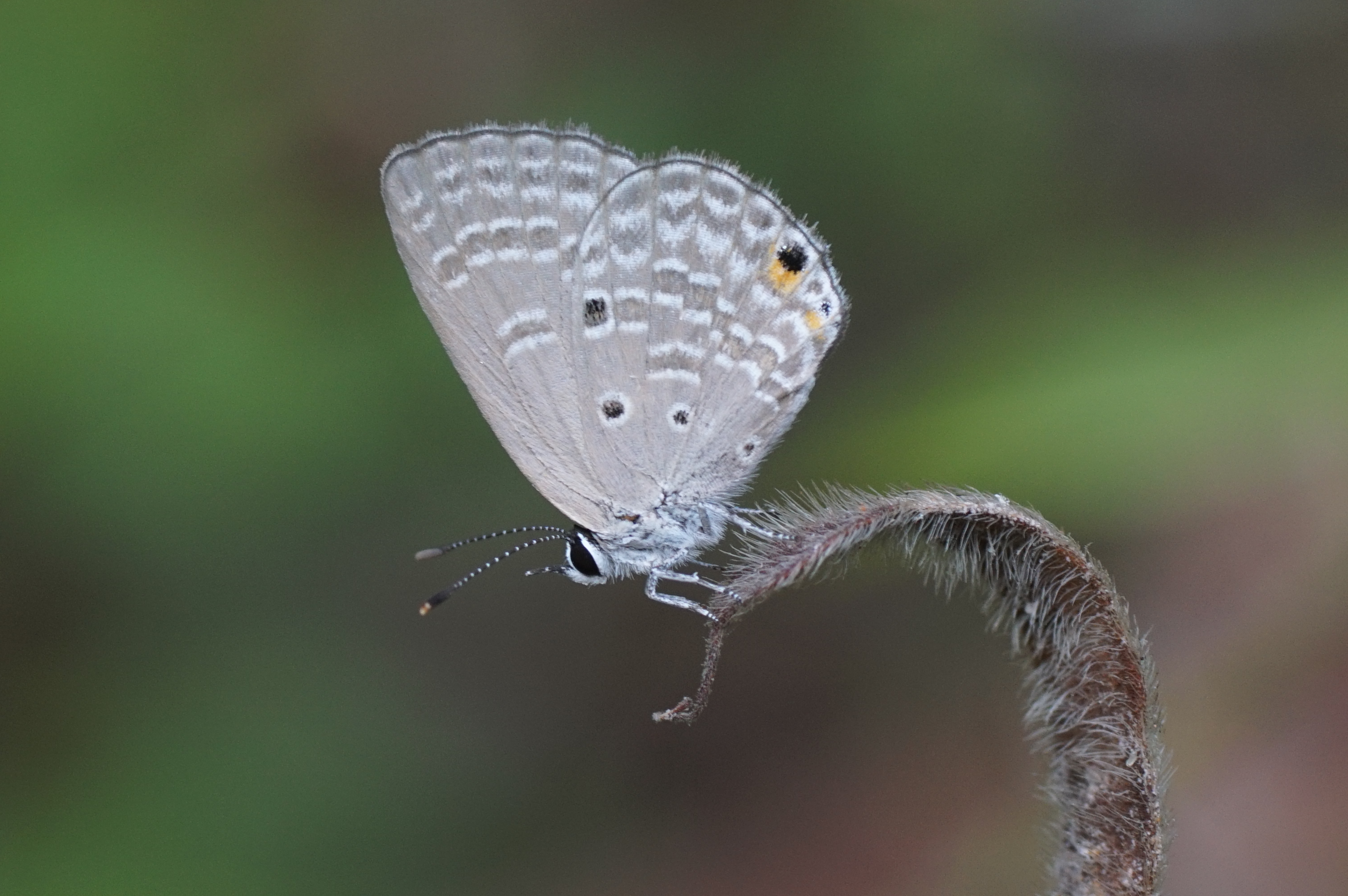
Ventral view

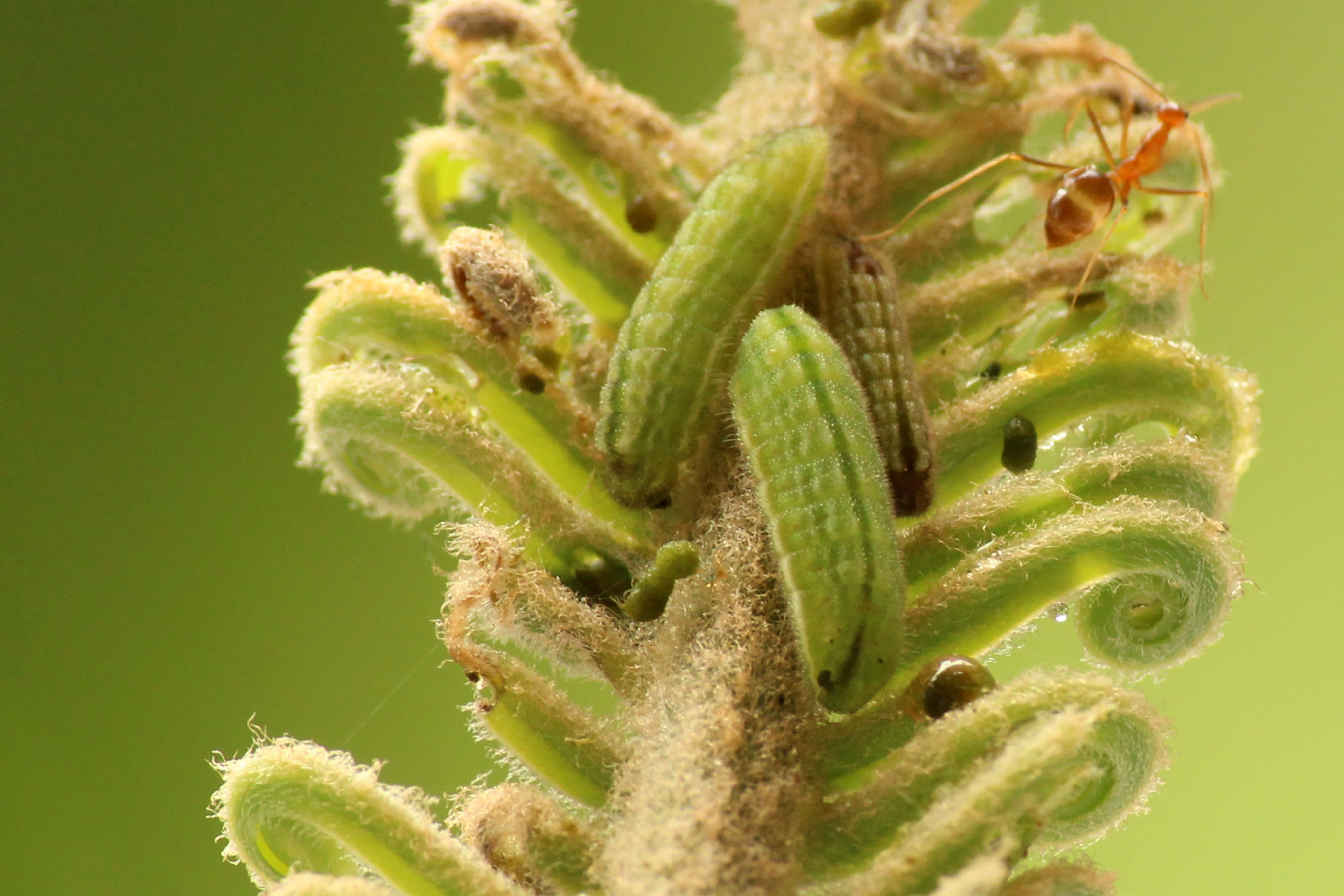
Larva

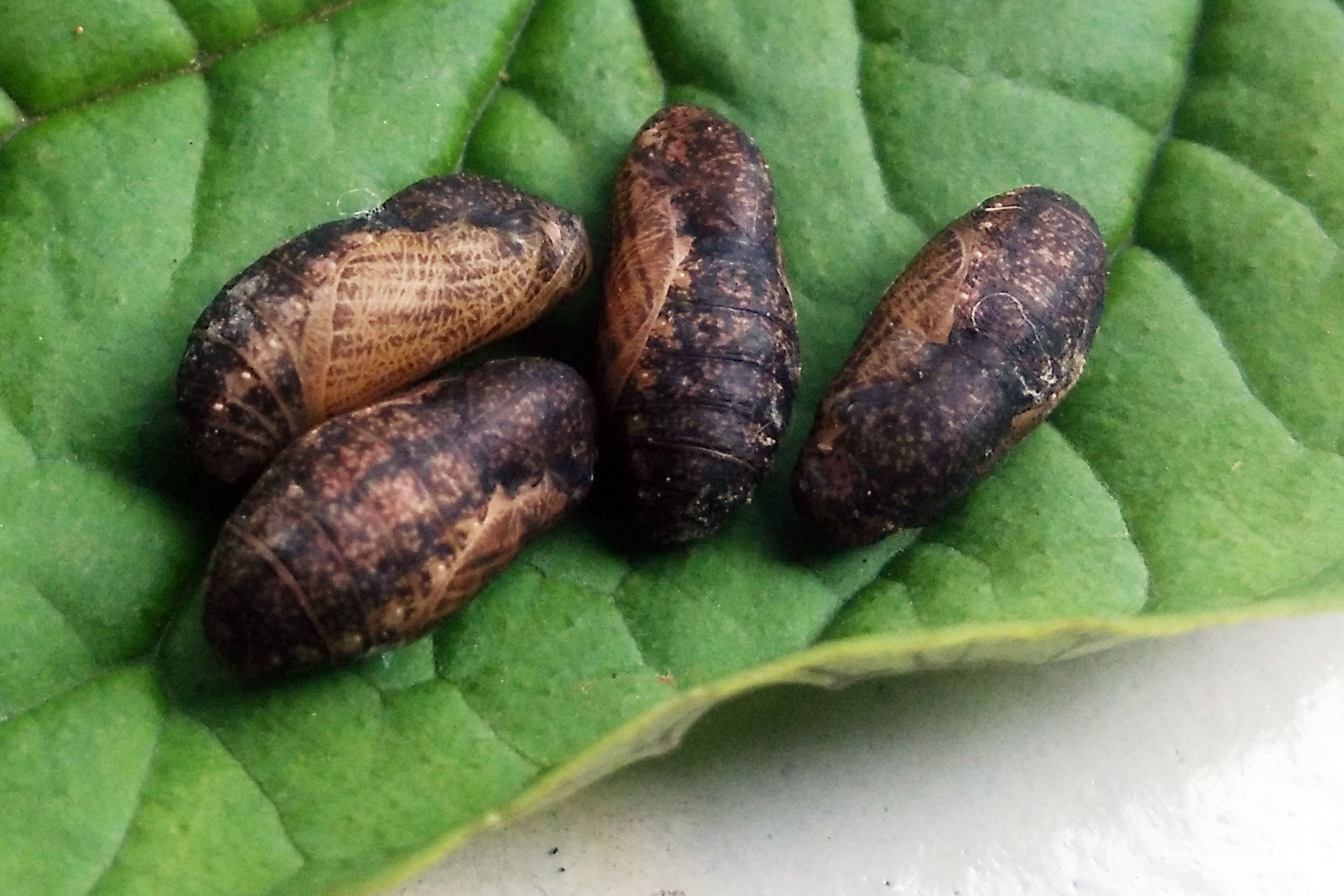
Pupa

==== Genus: Megisba ====
===== Megisba malaya (Malayan) =====
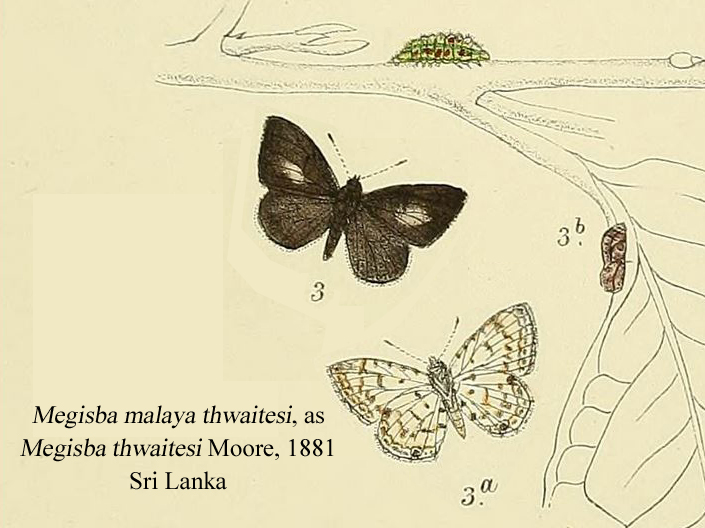
Illustration

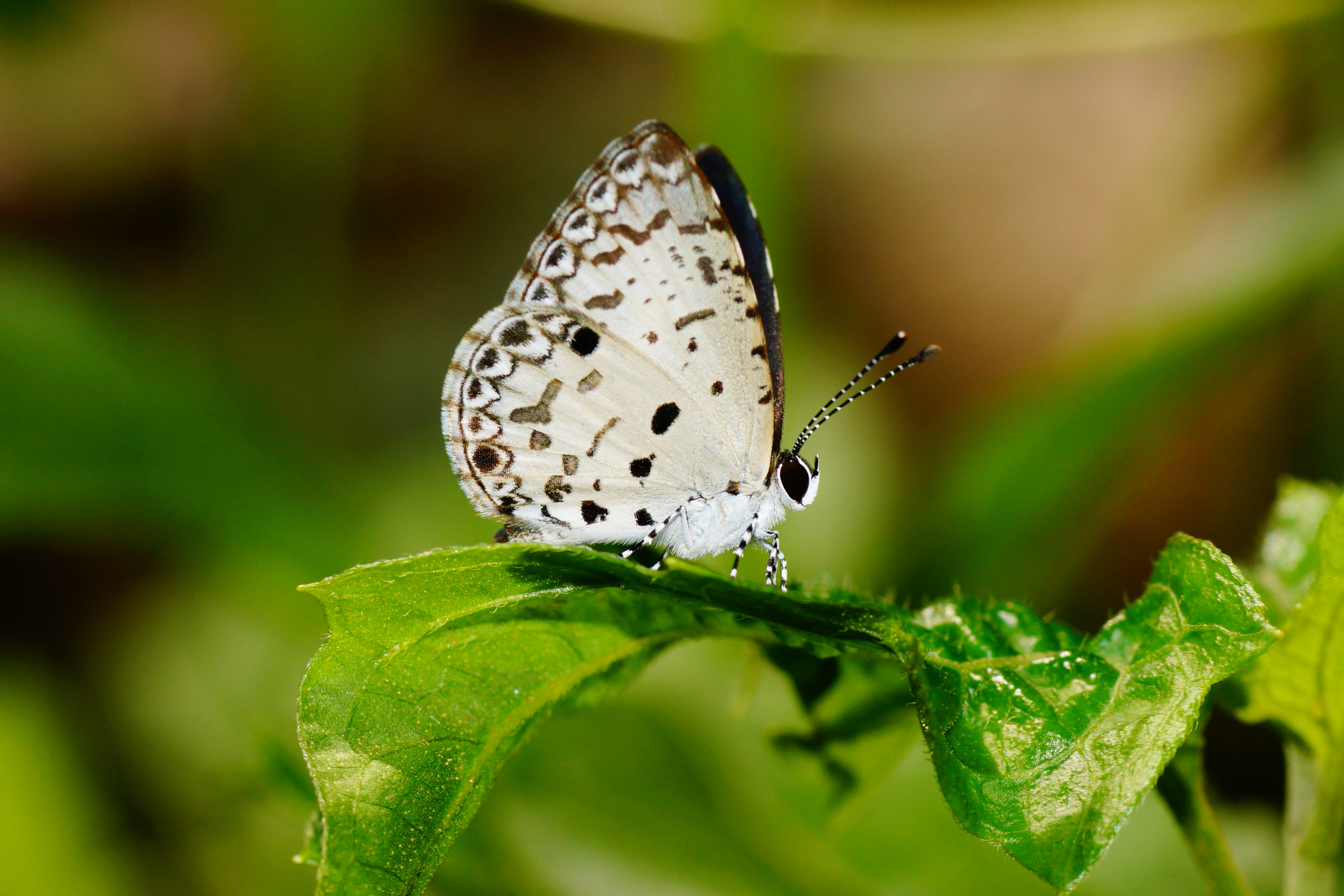
Ventral view

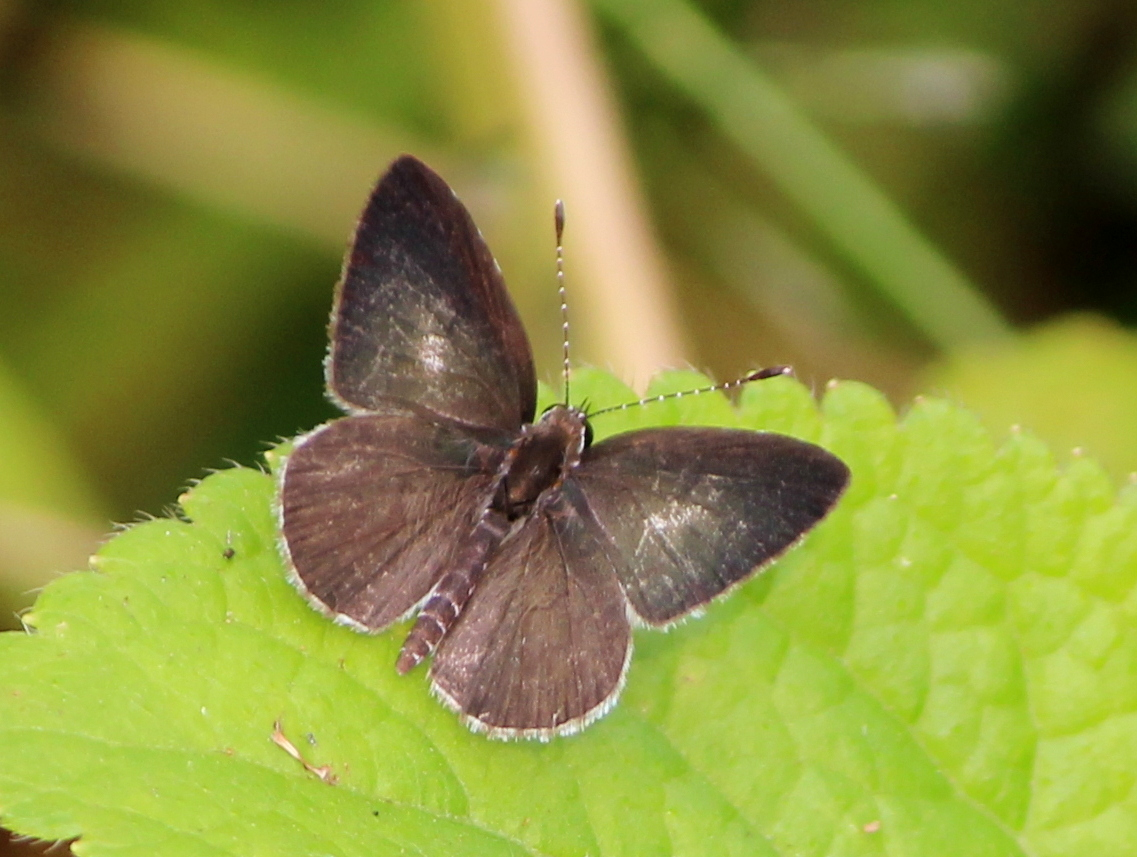
Dorsal view

==== Genus: Nacaduba ====
===== Nacaduba beroe (opaque six-line blue) =====
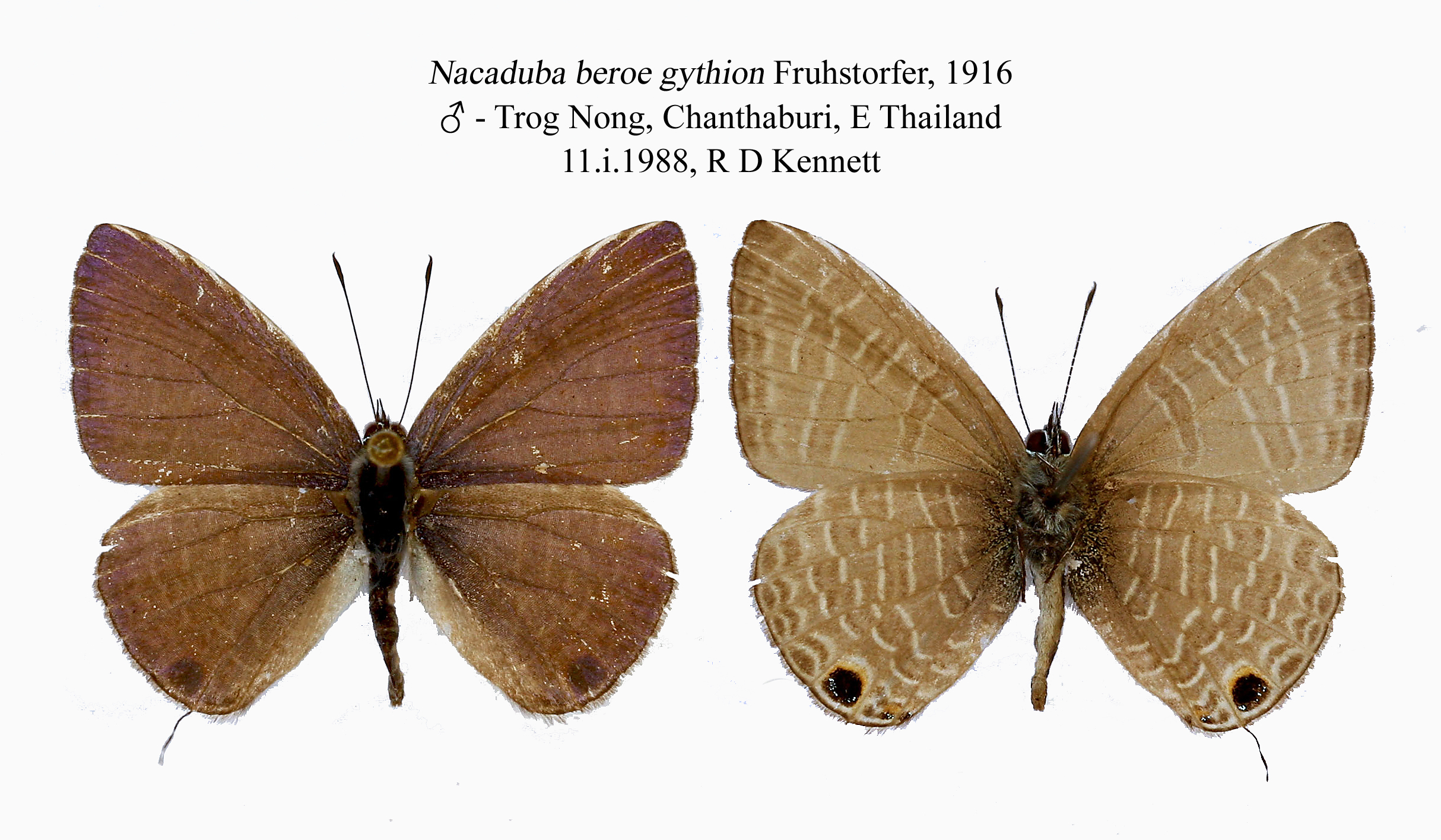
Museum specimen

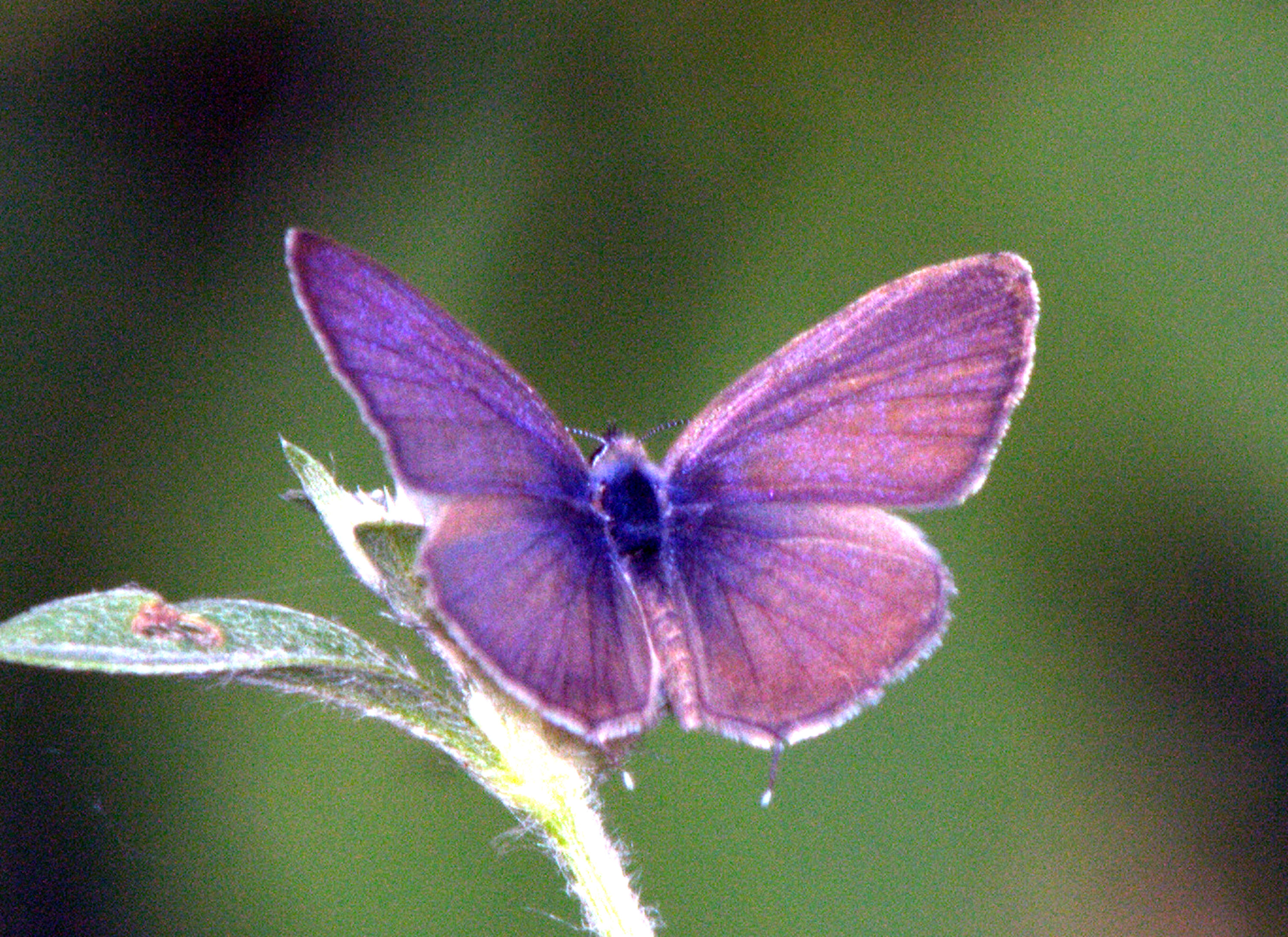
Dorsal view

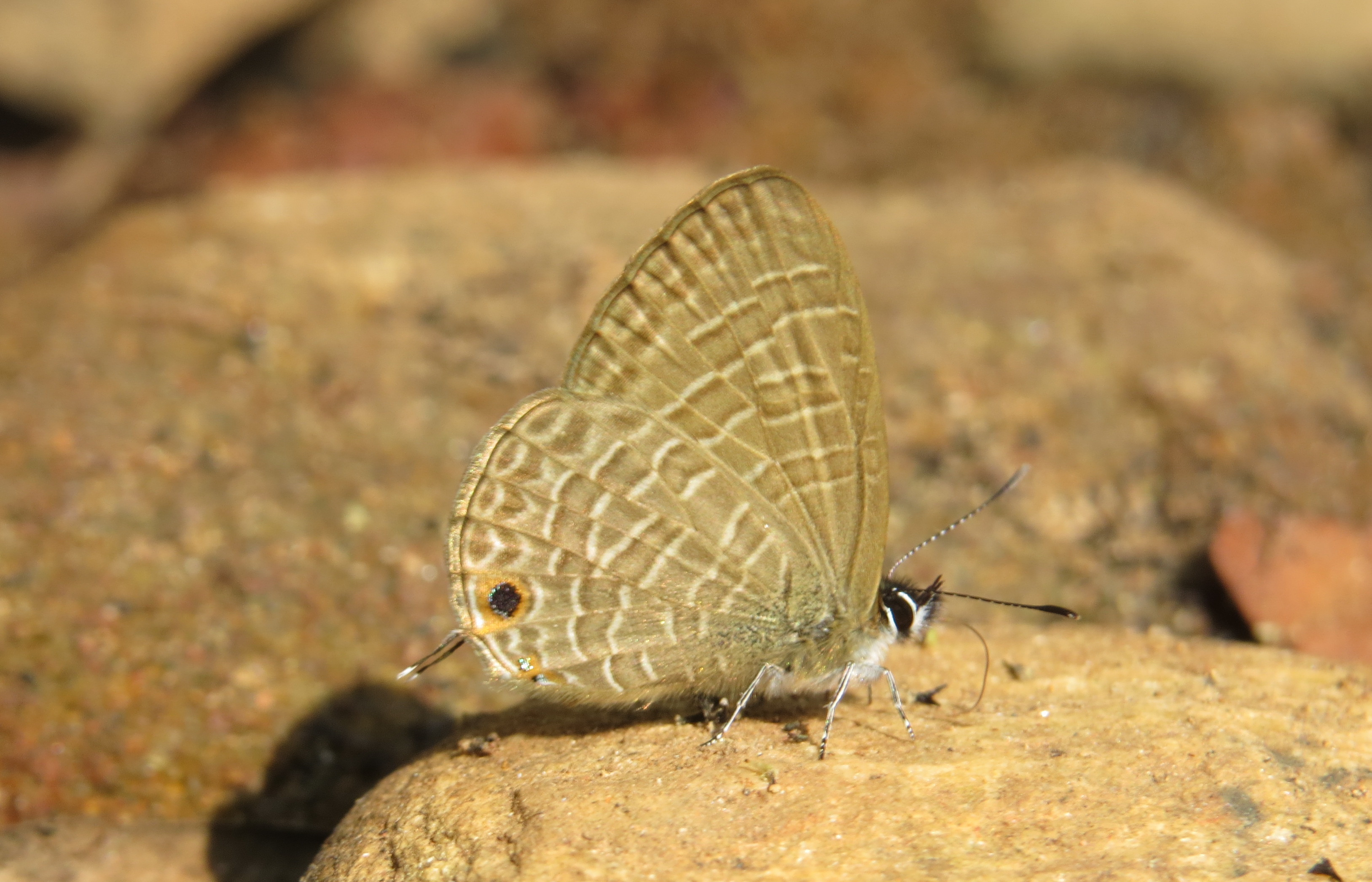
Ventral view

===== Nacaduba berenice (rounded six-line blue) =====
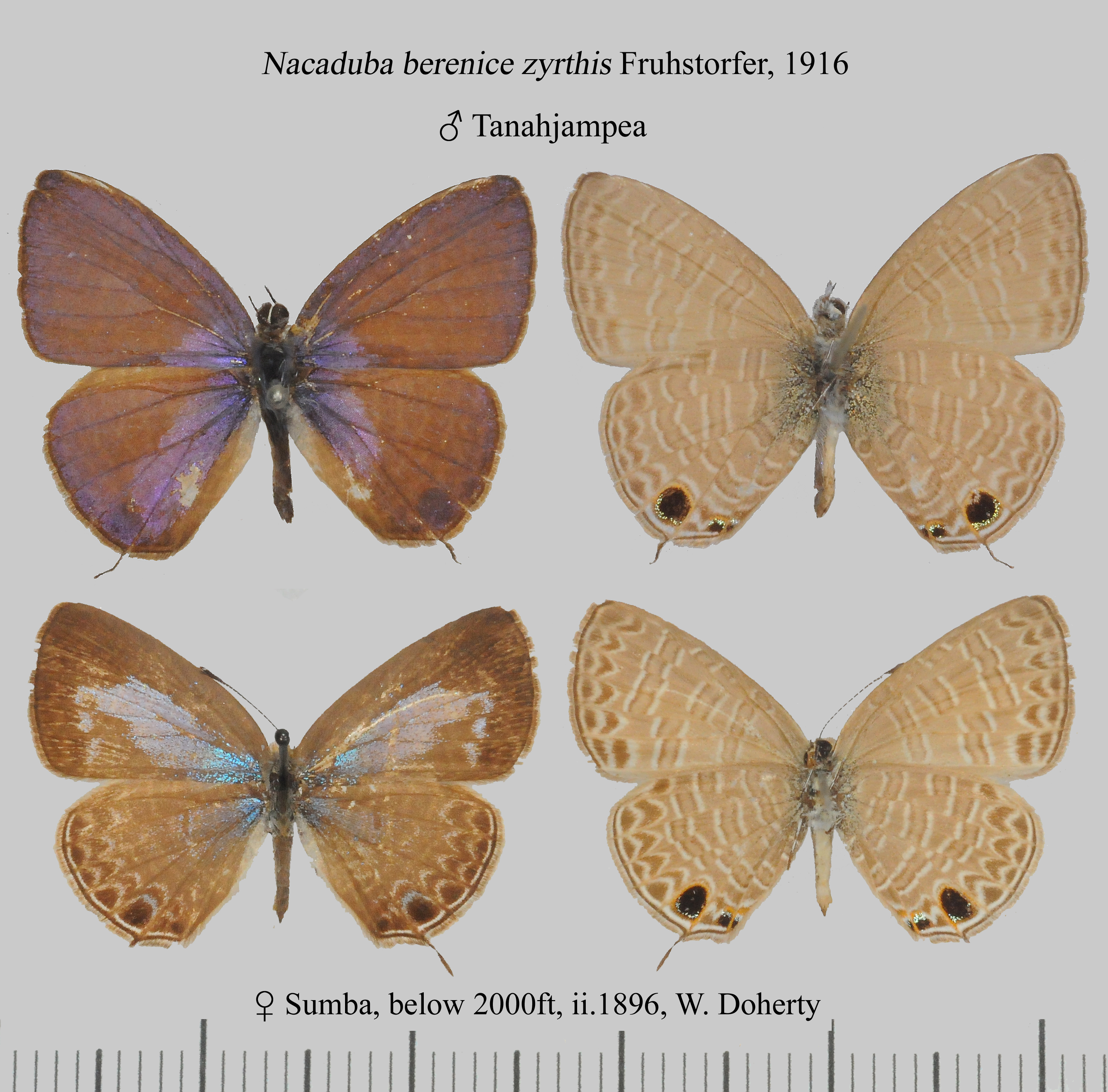
Museum specimen

===== Nacaduba calauria (dark Ceylon six-line blue) =====
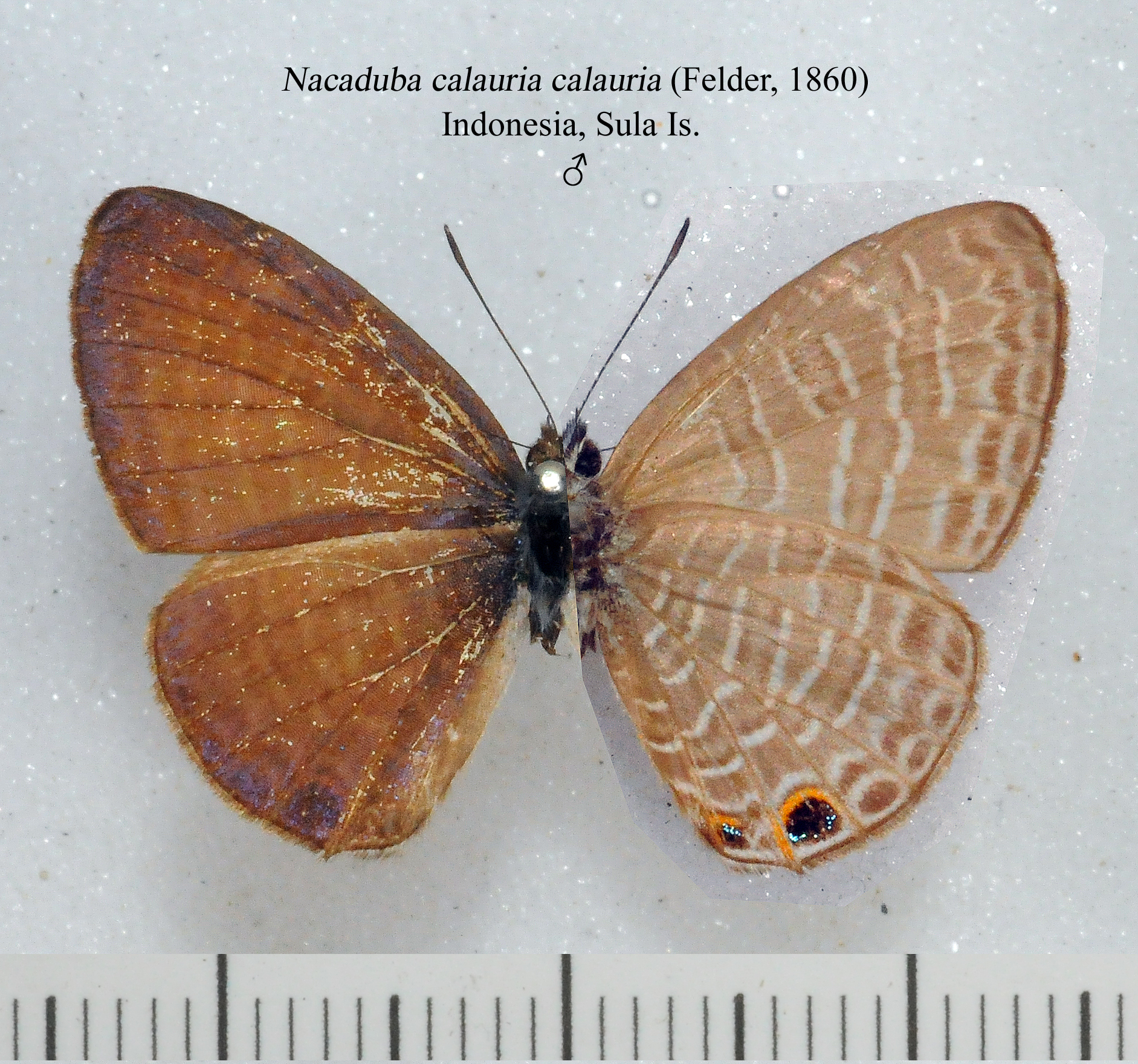
Museum specimen

===== Nacaduba hermus (pale four-line blue) =====
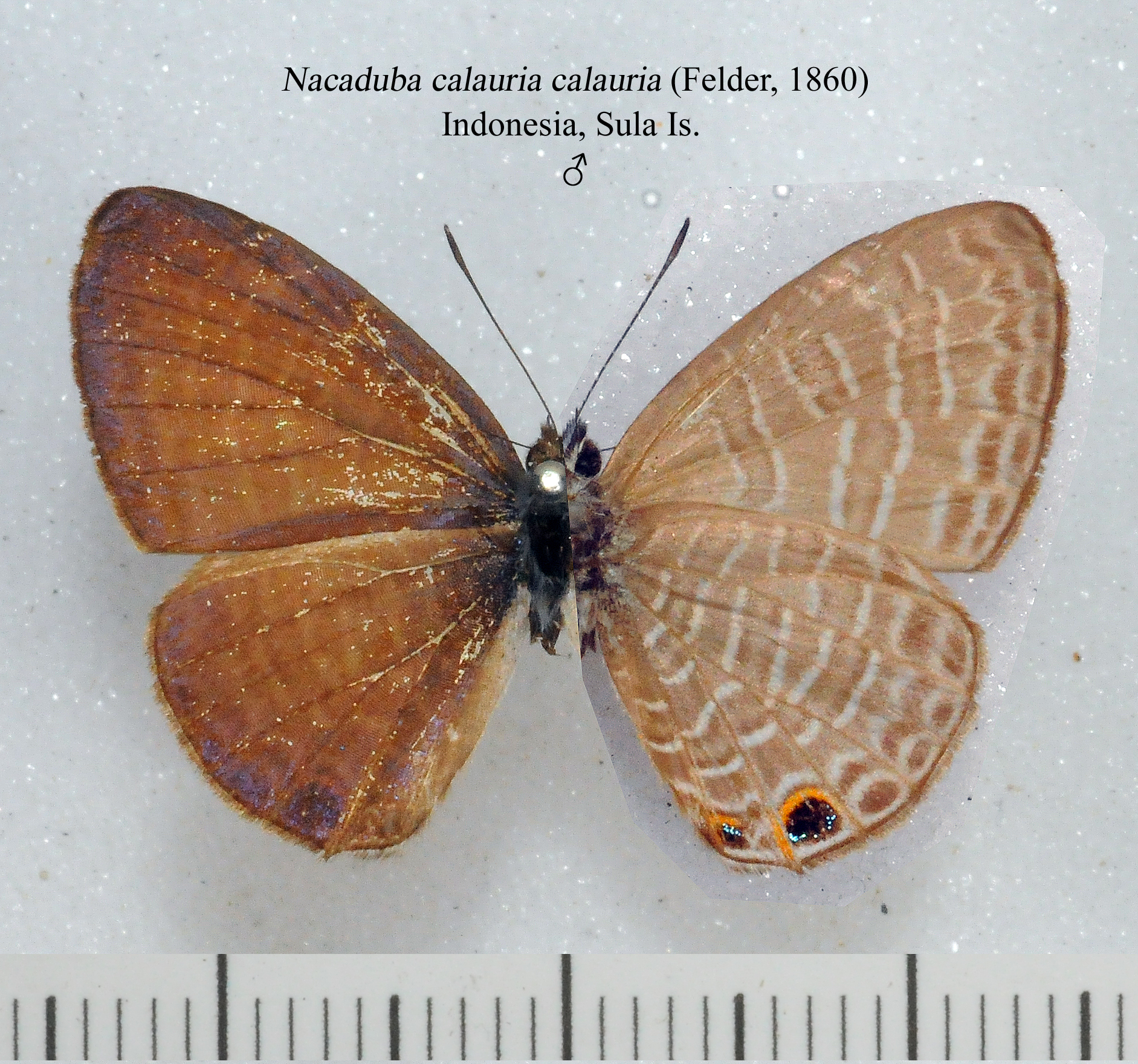
Museum specimen

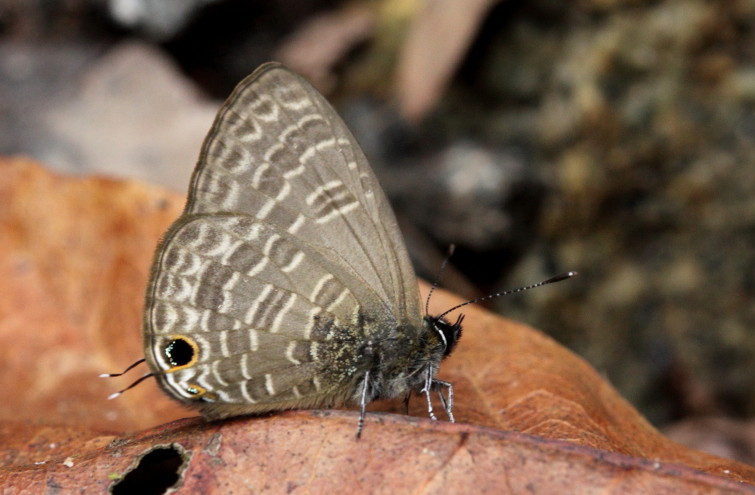
Ventral view

===== Nacaduba kurava (transparent six-line blue) =====
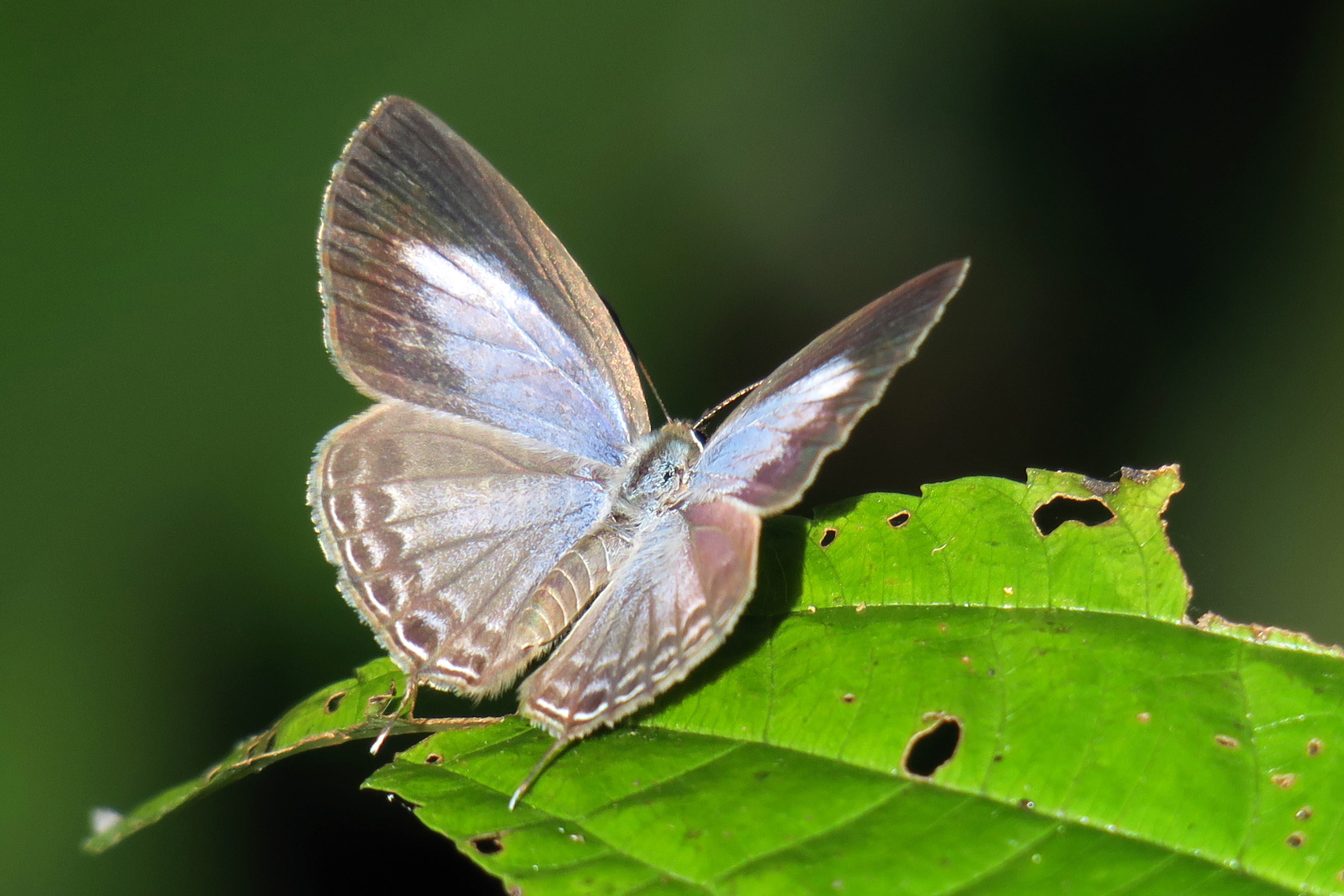
Dorsal view

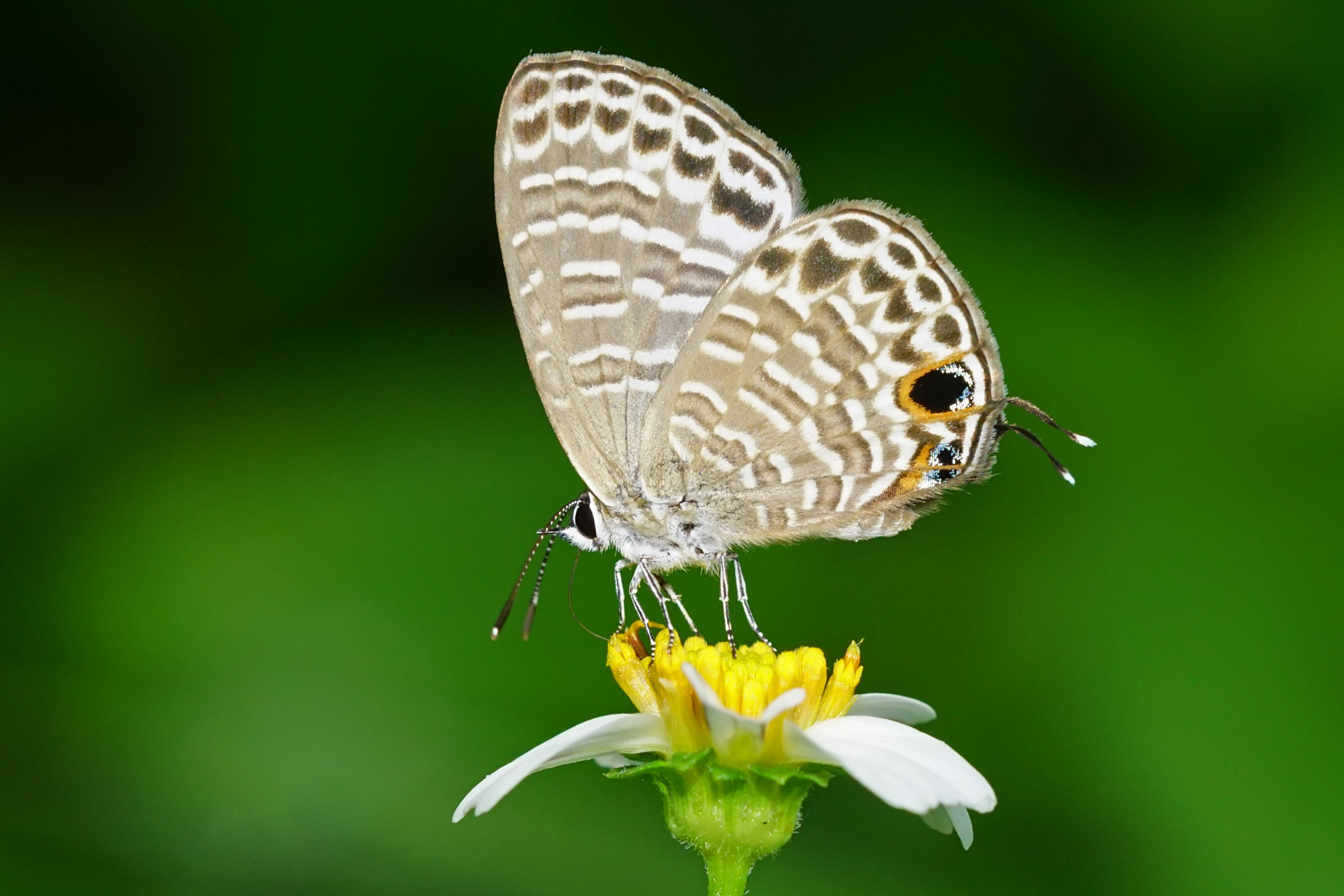
Ventral view

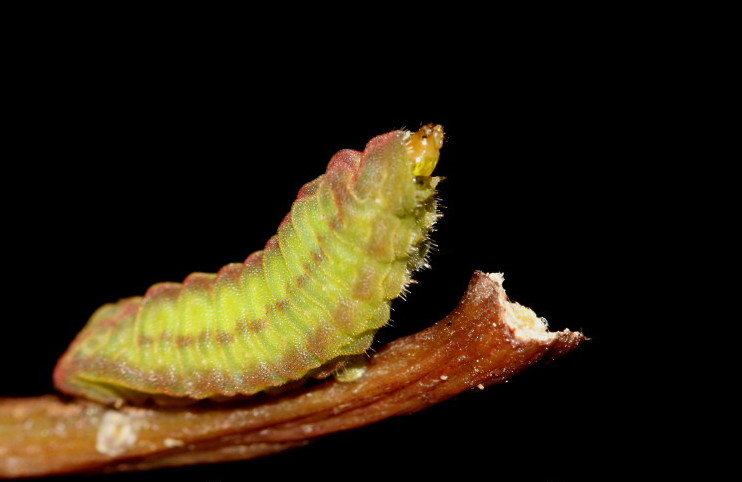
Larva

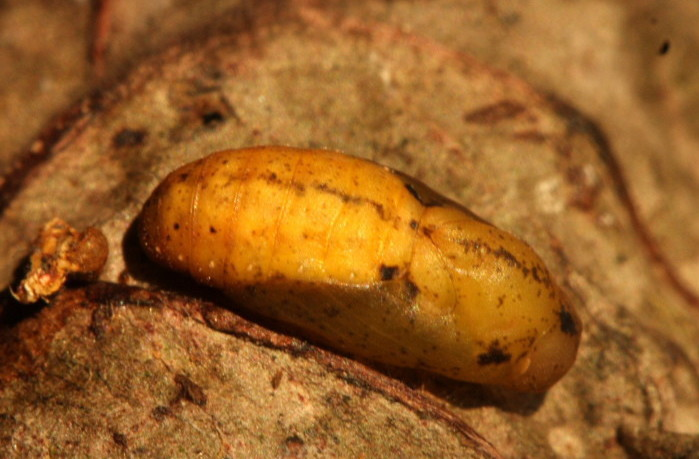
Pupa

===== Nacaduba pactolus (large four-line blue) =====
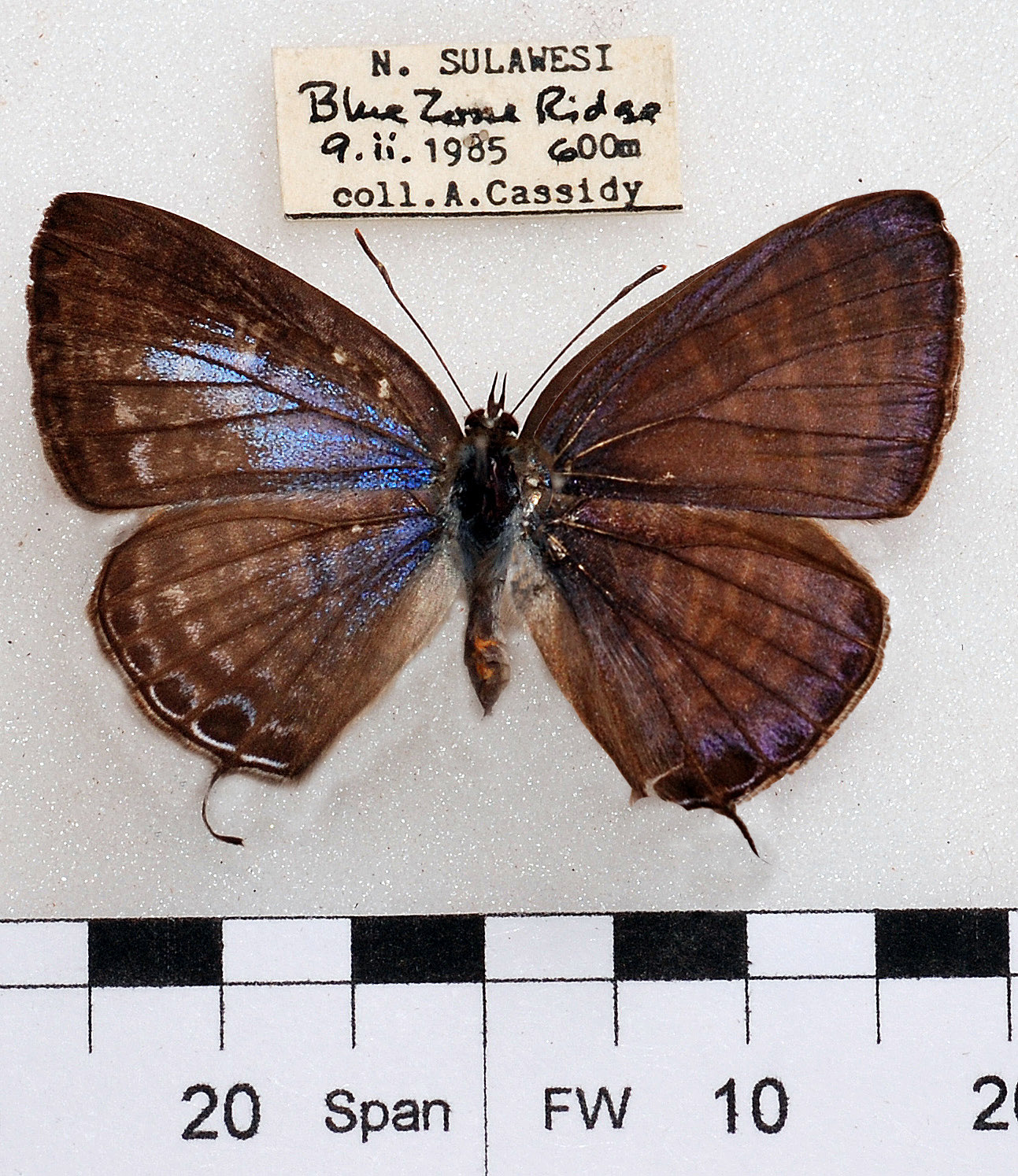
Dorsal view

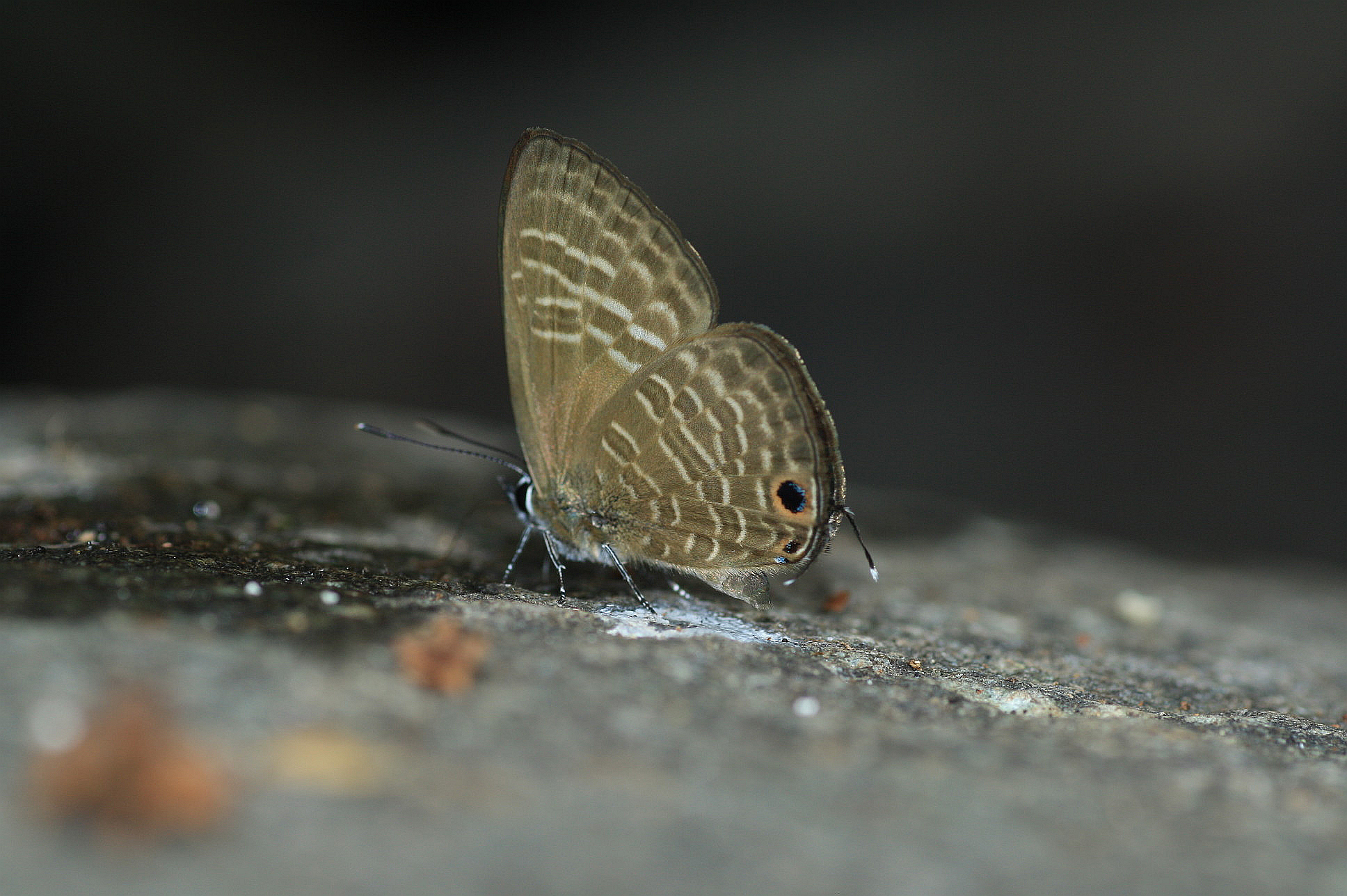
Ventral view

==== Genus: Neopithecops ====
===== Neopithecops zalmora (Quaker) =====
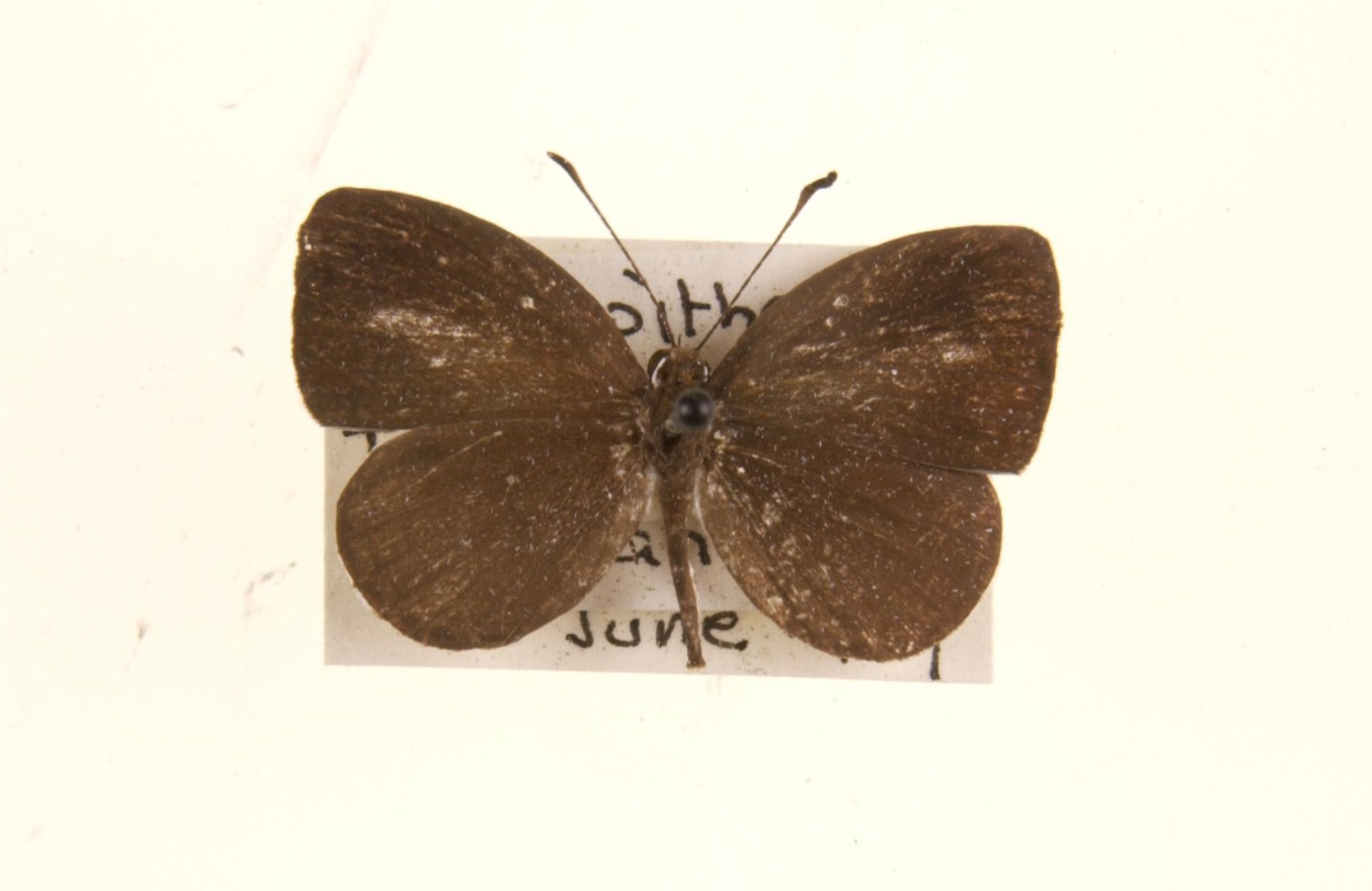
Dorsal view

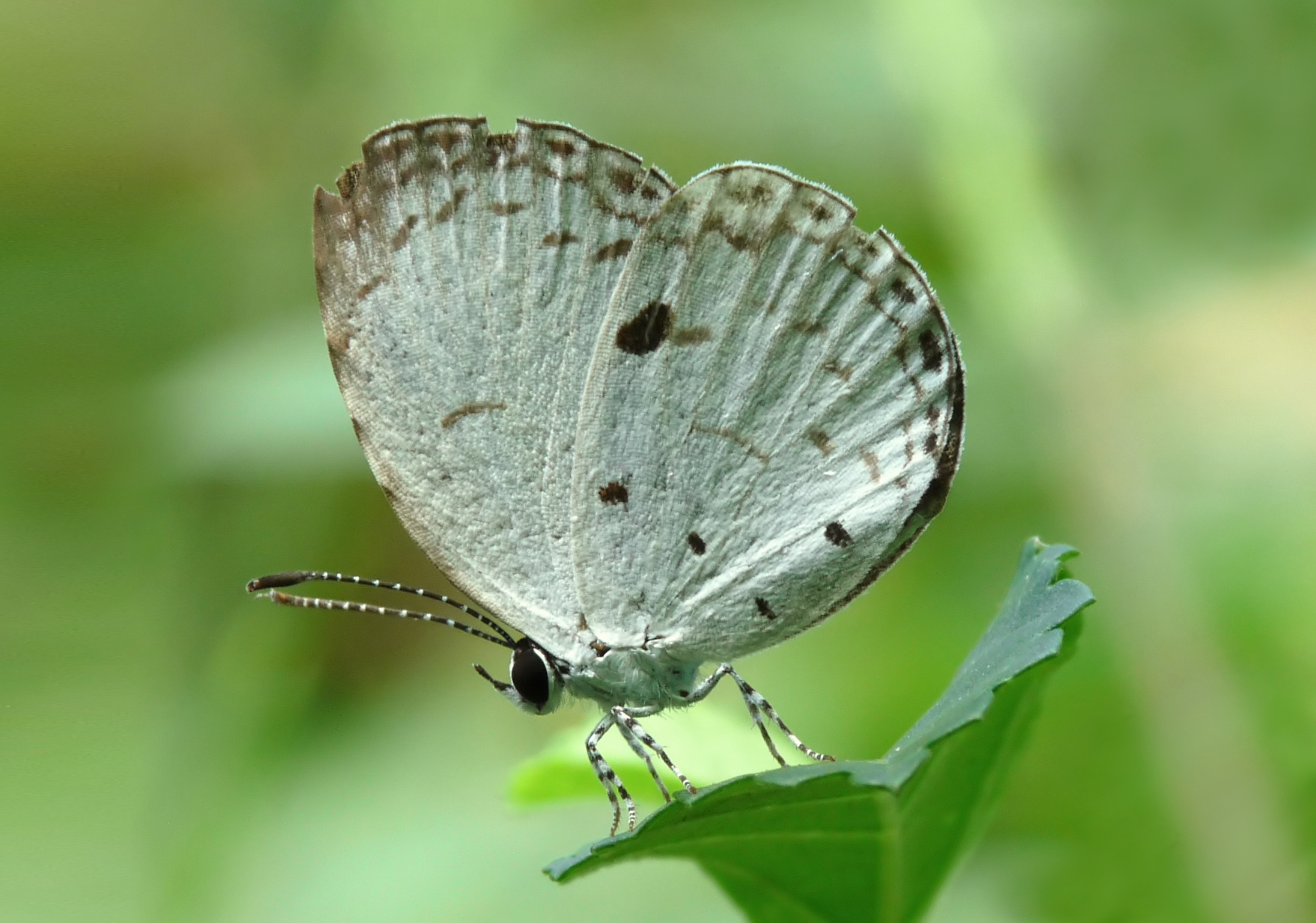
Ventral view

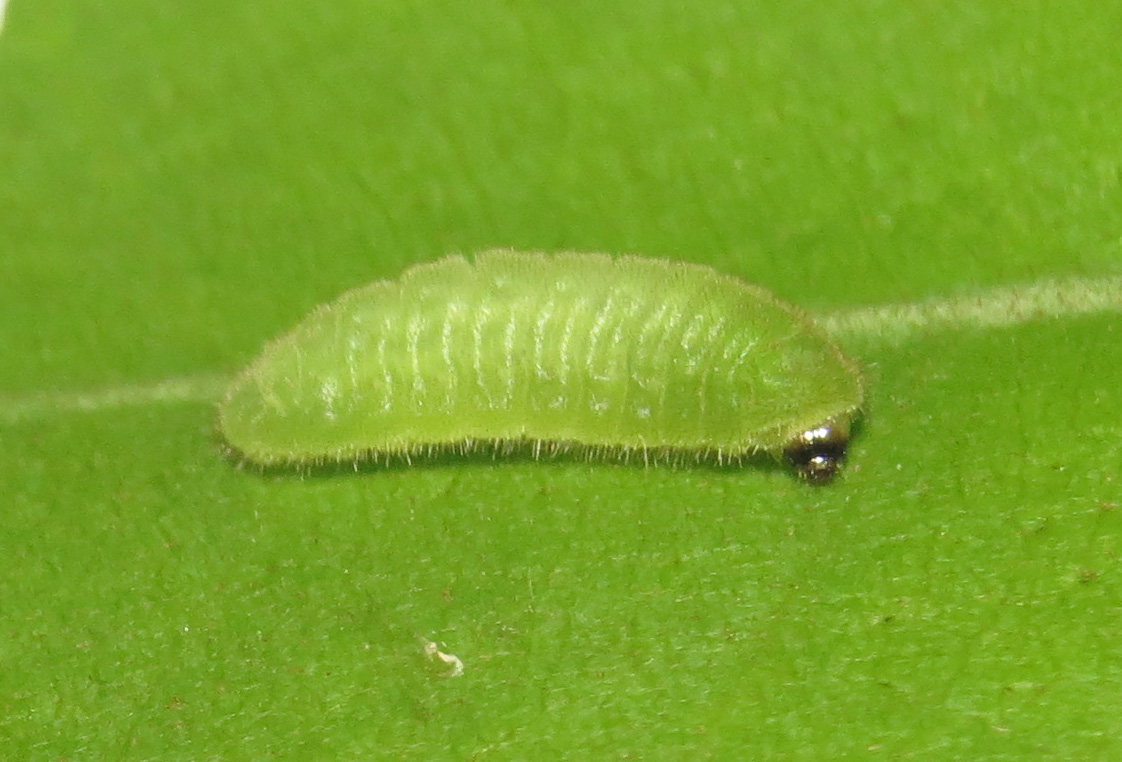
Larva

==== Genus: Petrelaea ====
===== Petrelaea dana (dingy lineblue) =====
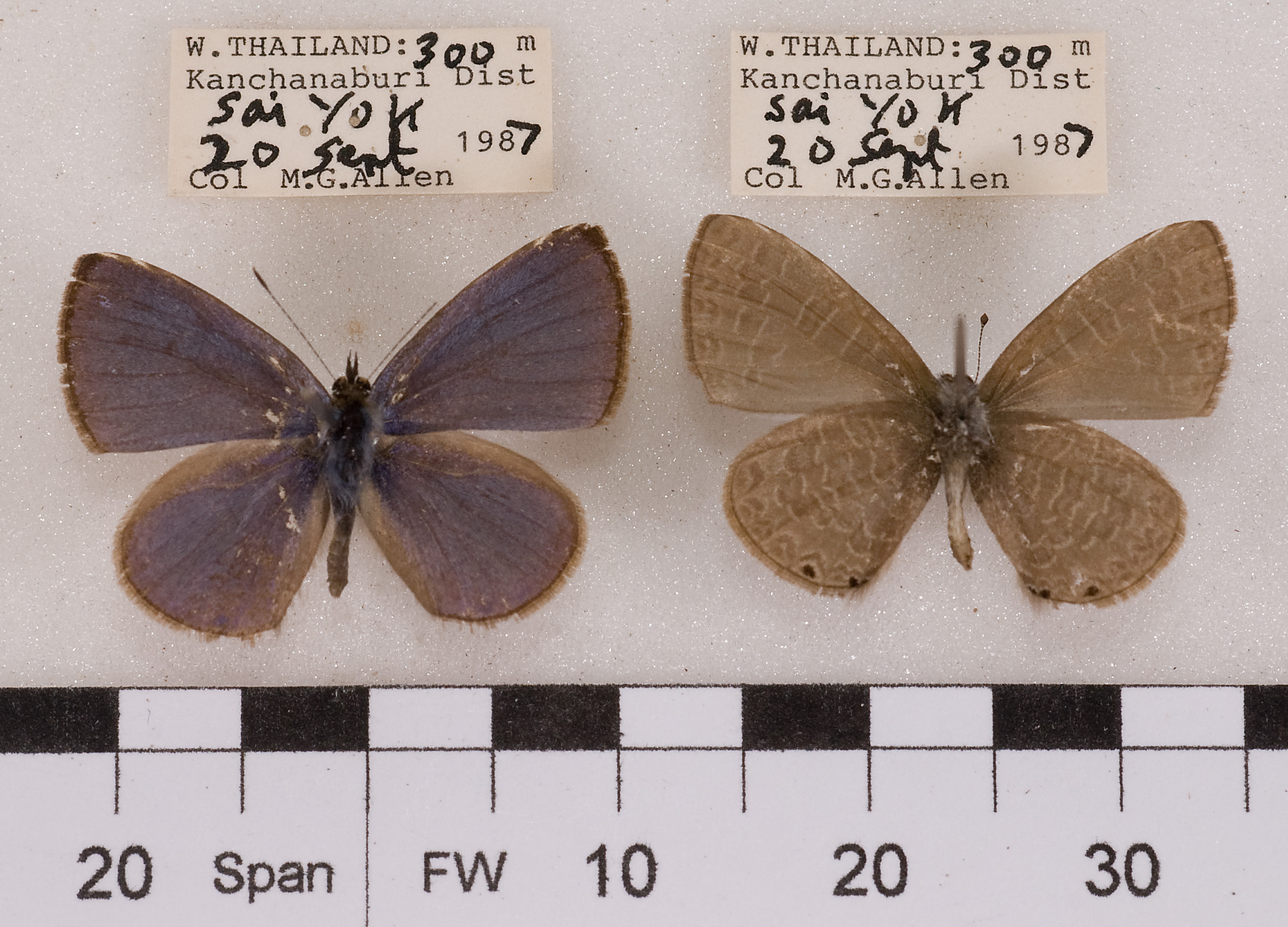
Museum specimen

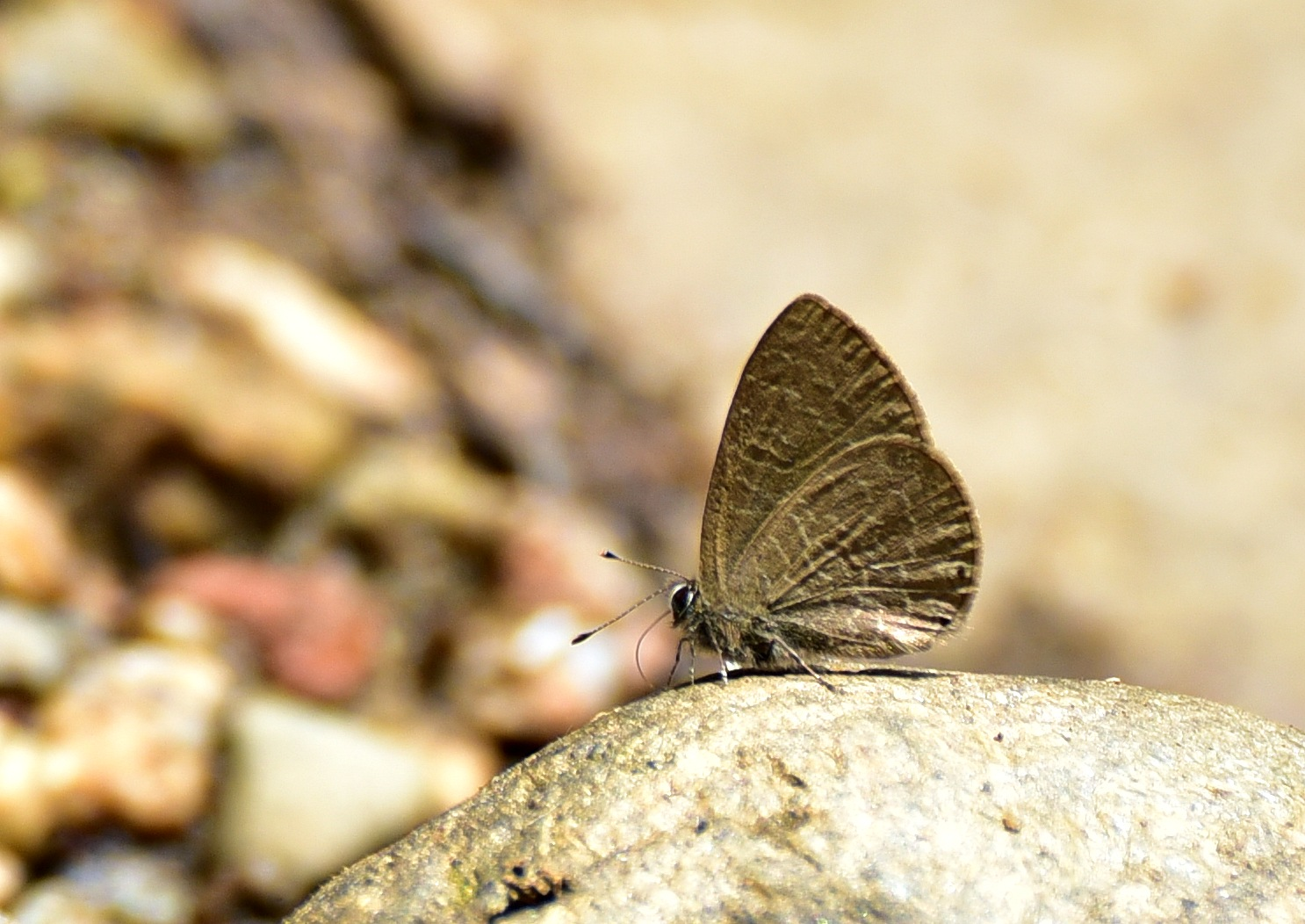
Ventral view

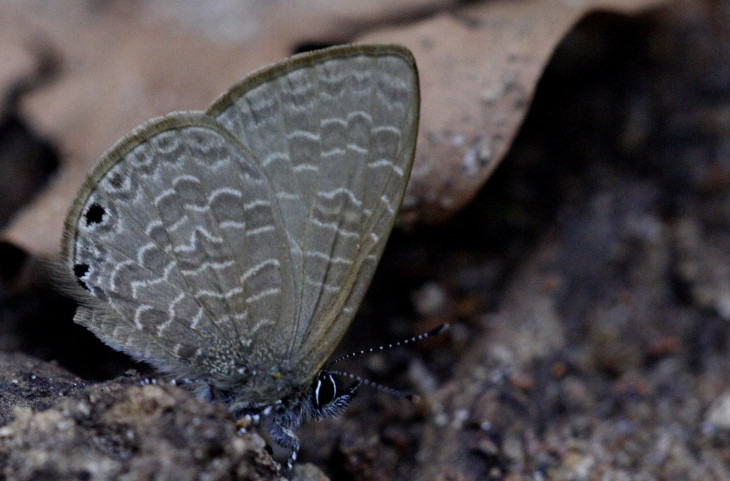
Ventral view

==== Genus: Prosotas (lineblues) ====
===== Prosotas dubiosa (tailless lineblue) =====
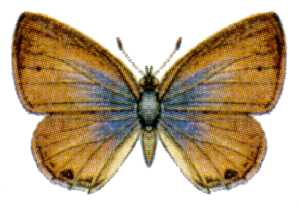
Dorsal view

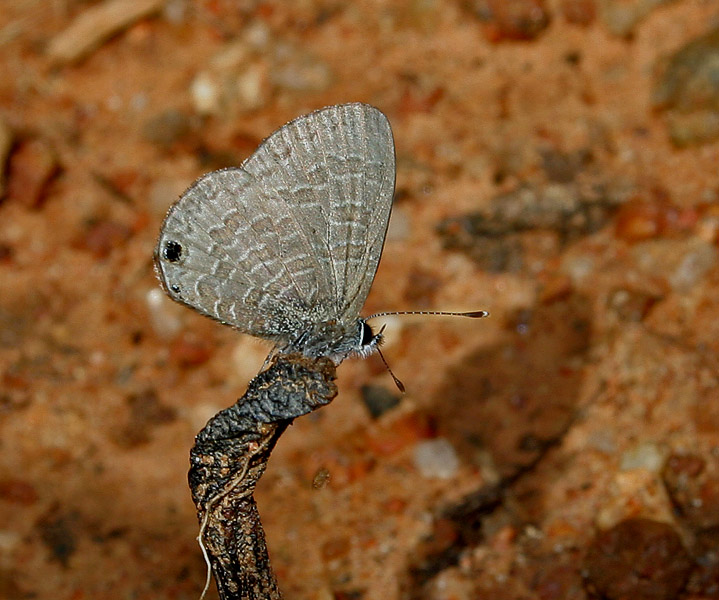
Ventral view

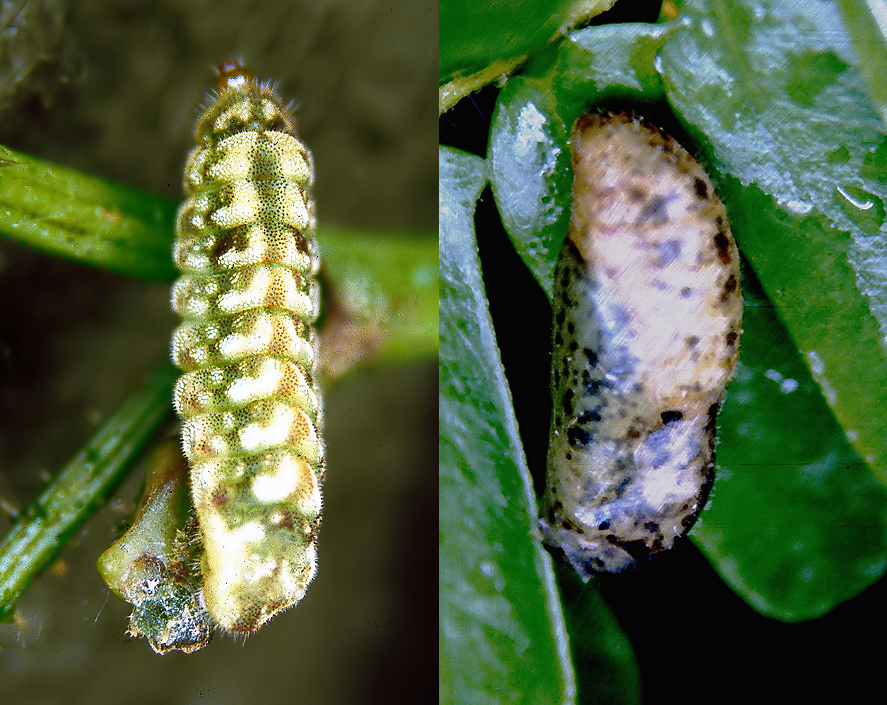
Larva and Pupa

===== Prosotas nora (common lineblue) =====
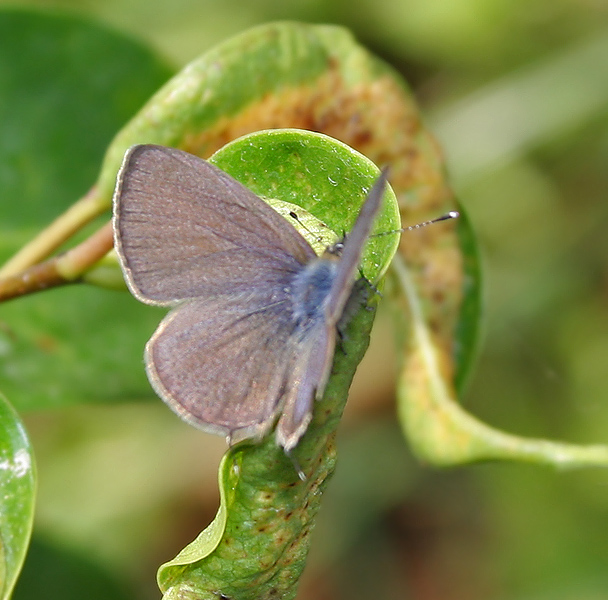
Dorsal view

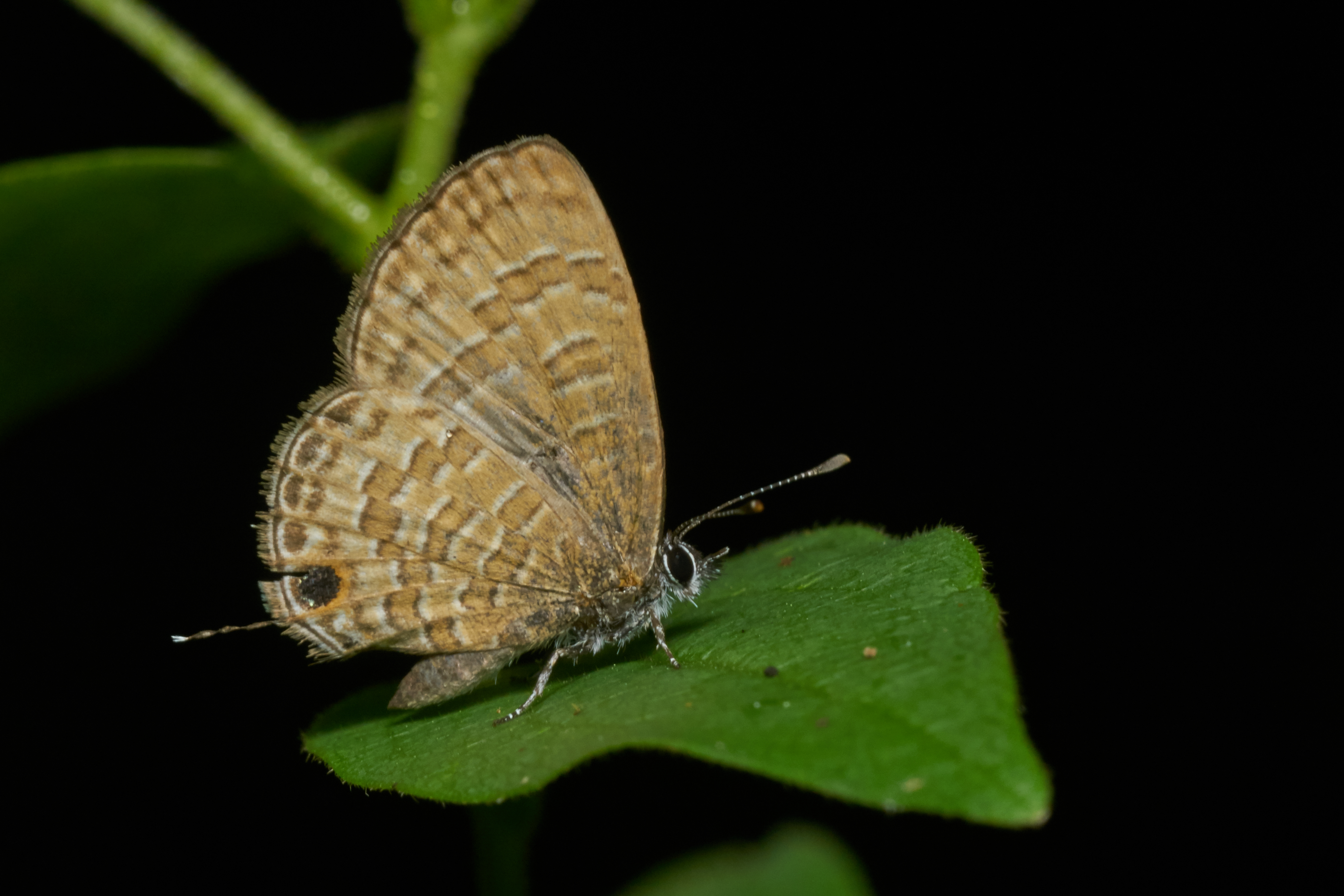
Ventral view

===== Prosotas noreia (white-tipped lineblue) =====
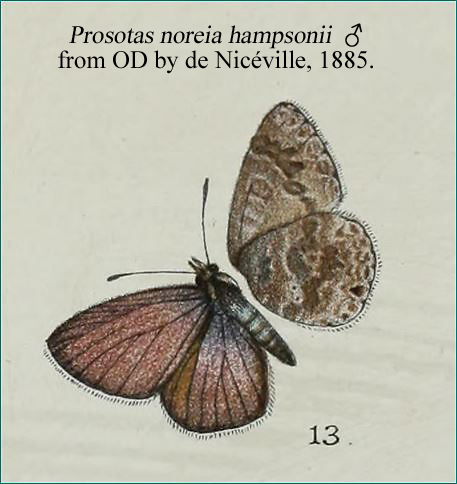
Dorsal view

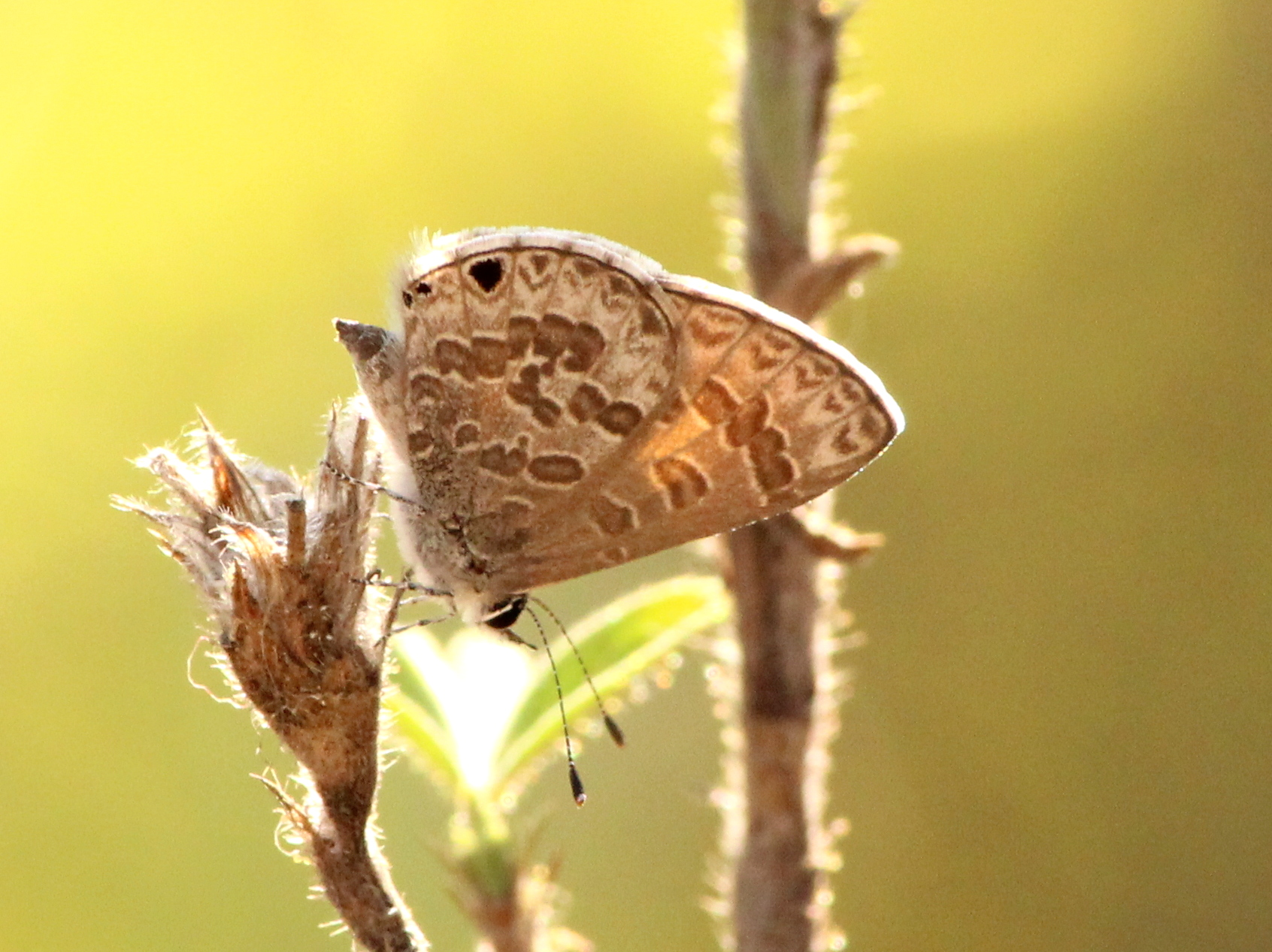
Ventral view

==== Genus: Pseudozizeeria (lineblues) ====
===== Pseudozizeeria maha (pale grass blue) =====
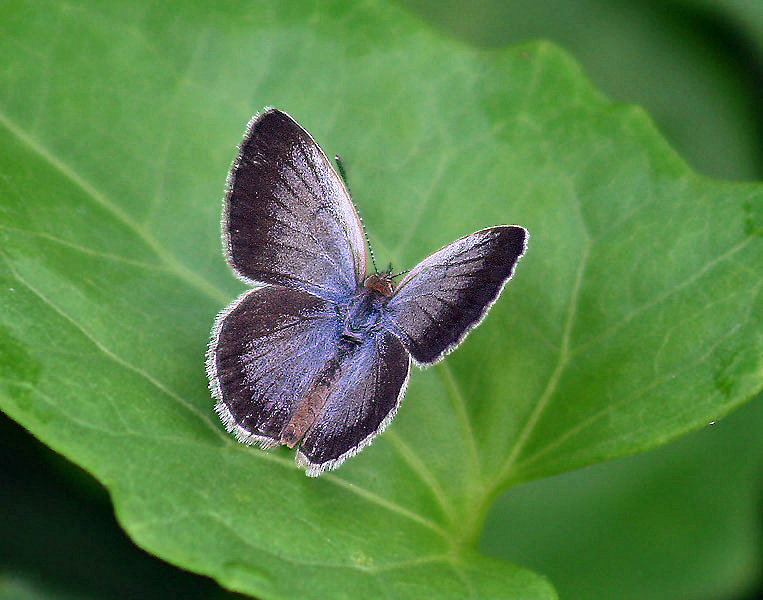
Dorsal view

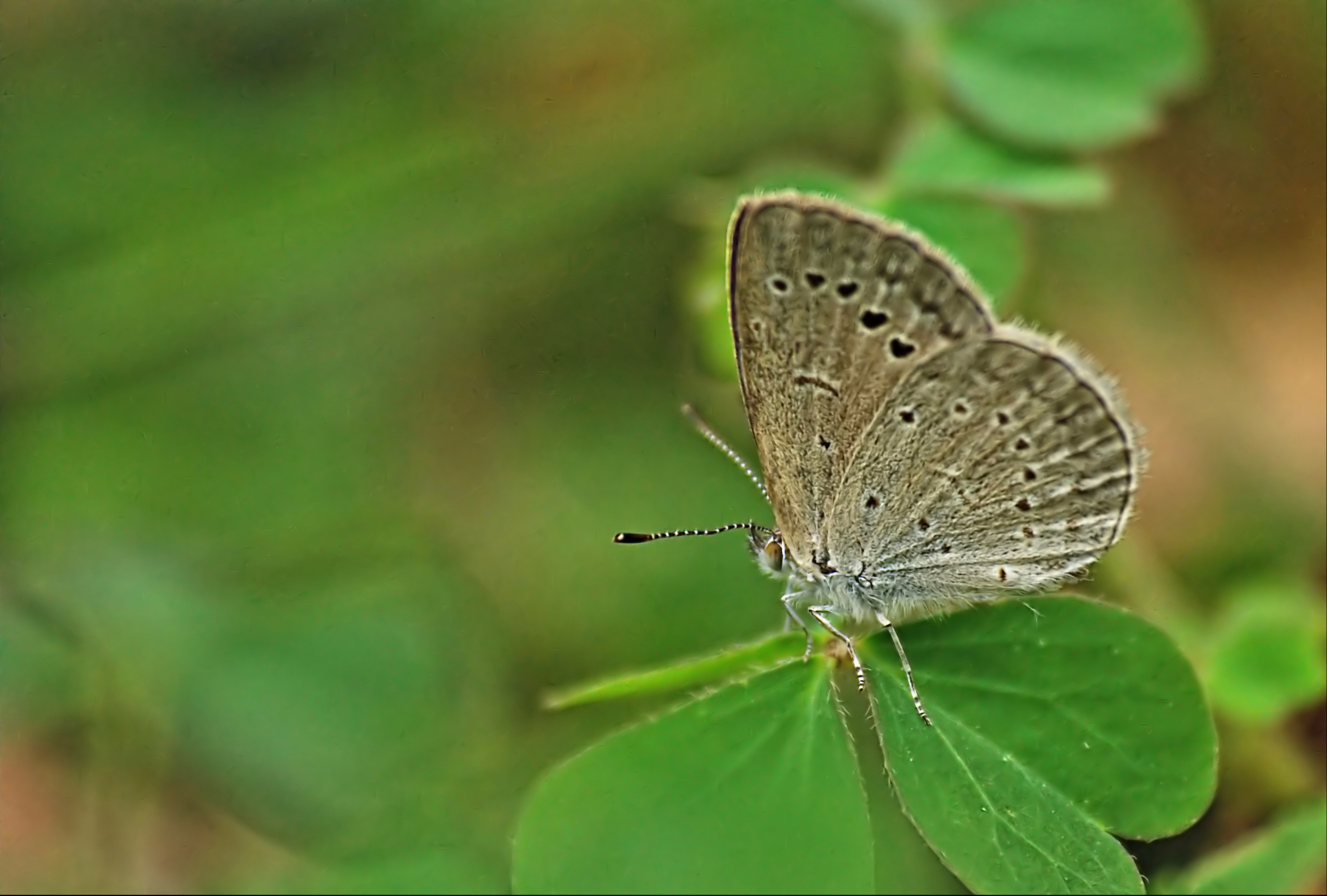
Ventral view

==== Genus: Talicada ====
===== Talicada nyseus (red Pierrot) =====
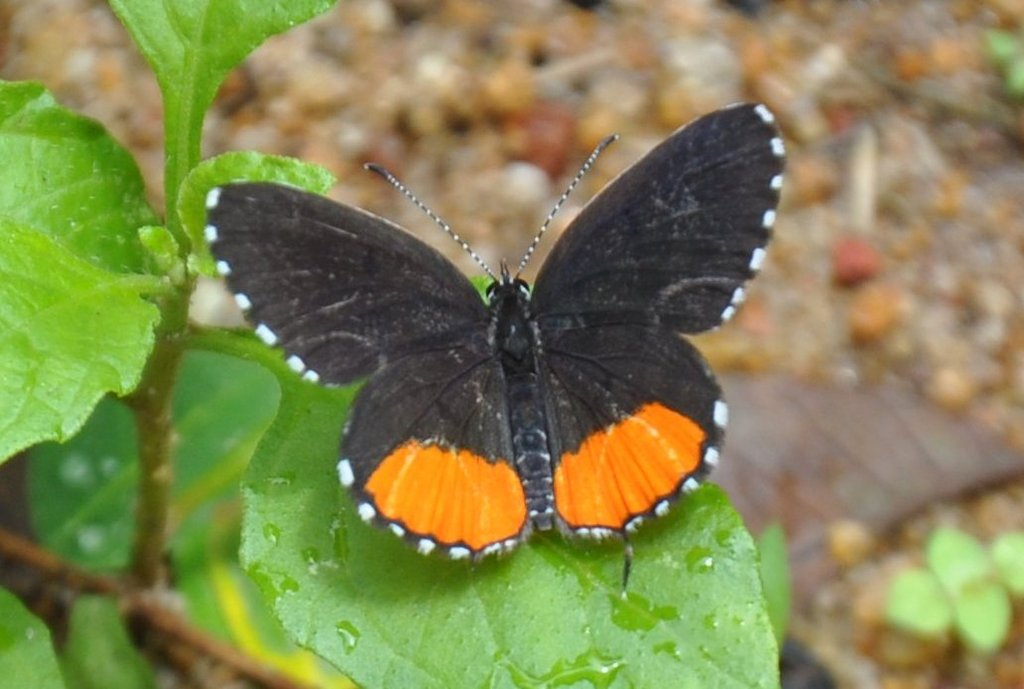
Dorsal view

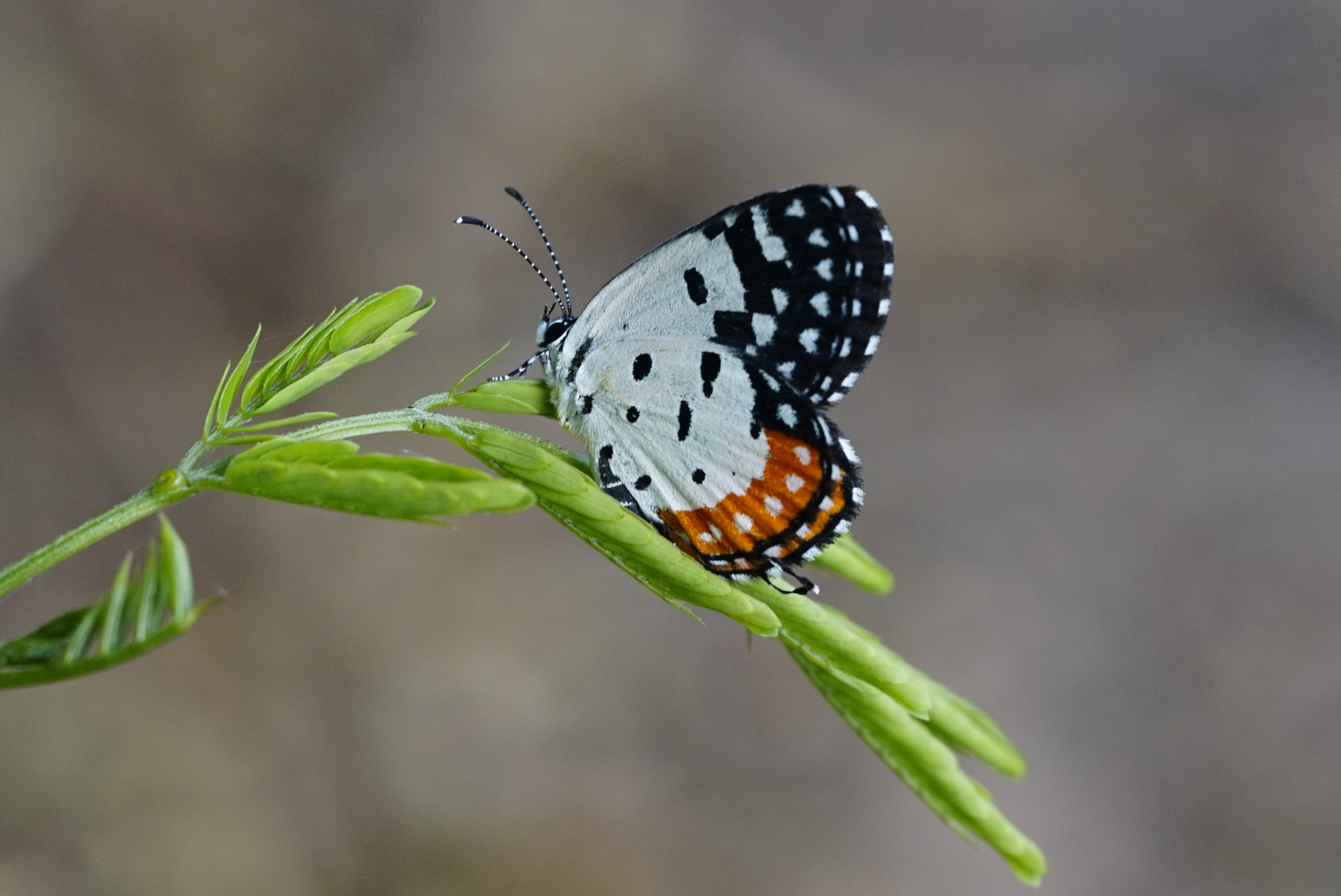
Ventral view

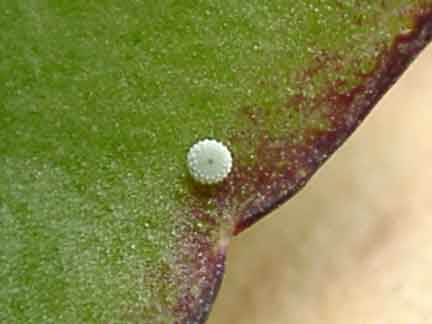
Egg

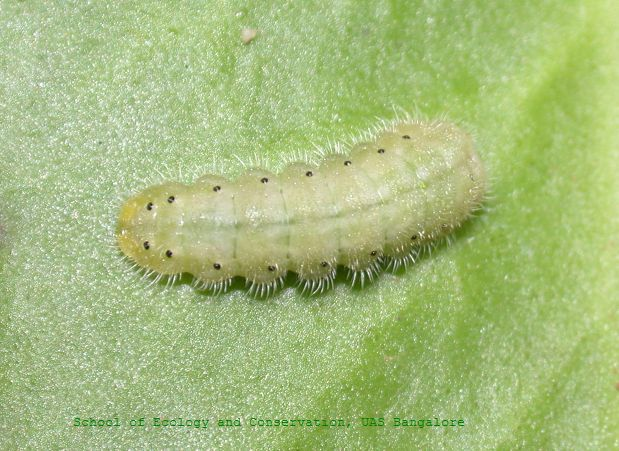
Larva

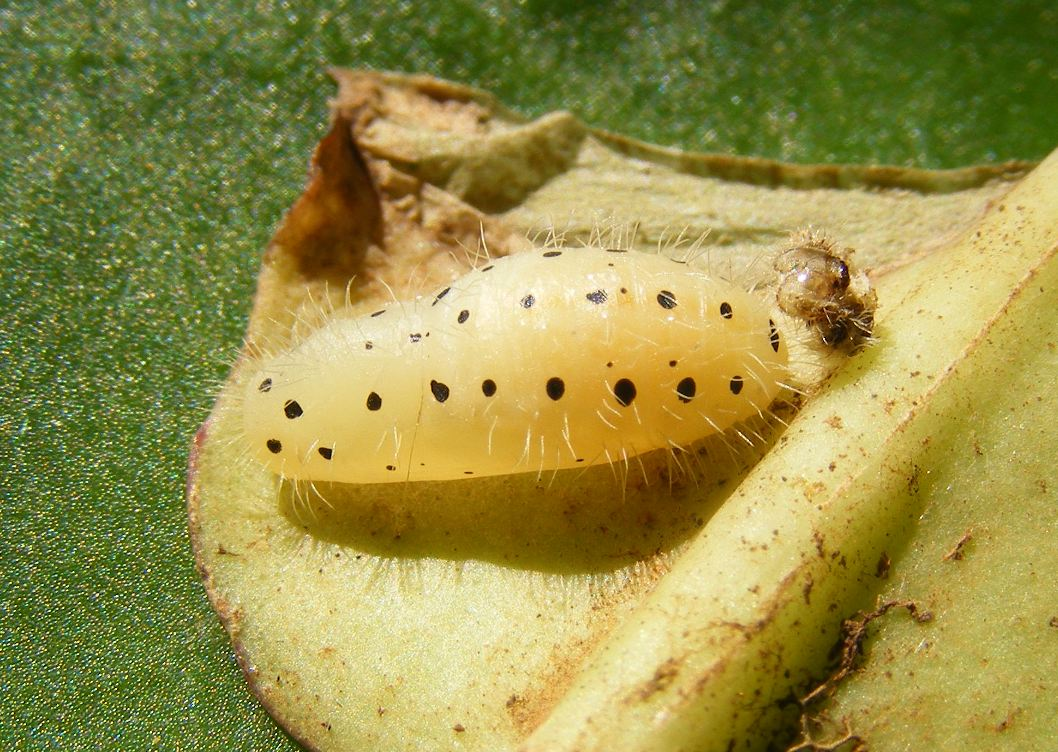
Pupa

==== Genus: Tarucus ====
===== Tarucus ananda (dark Pierrot) =====
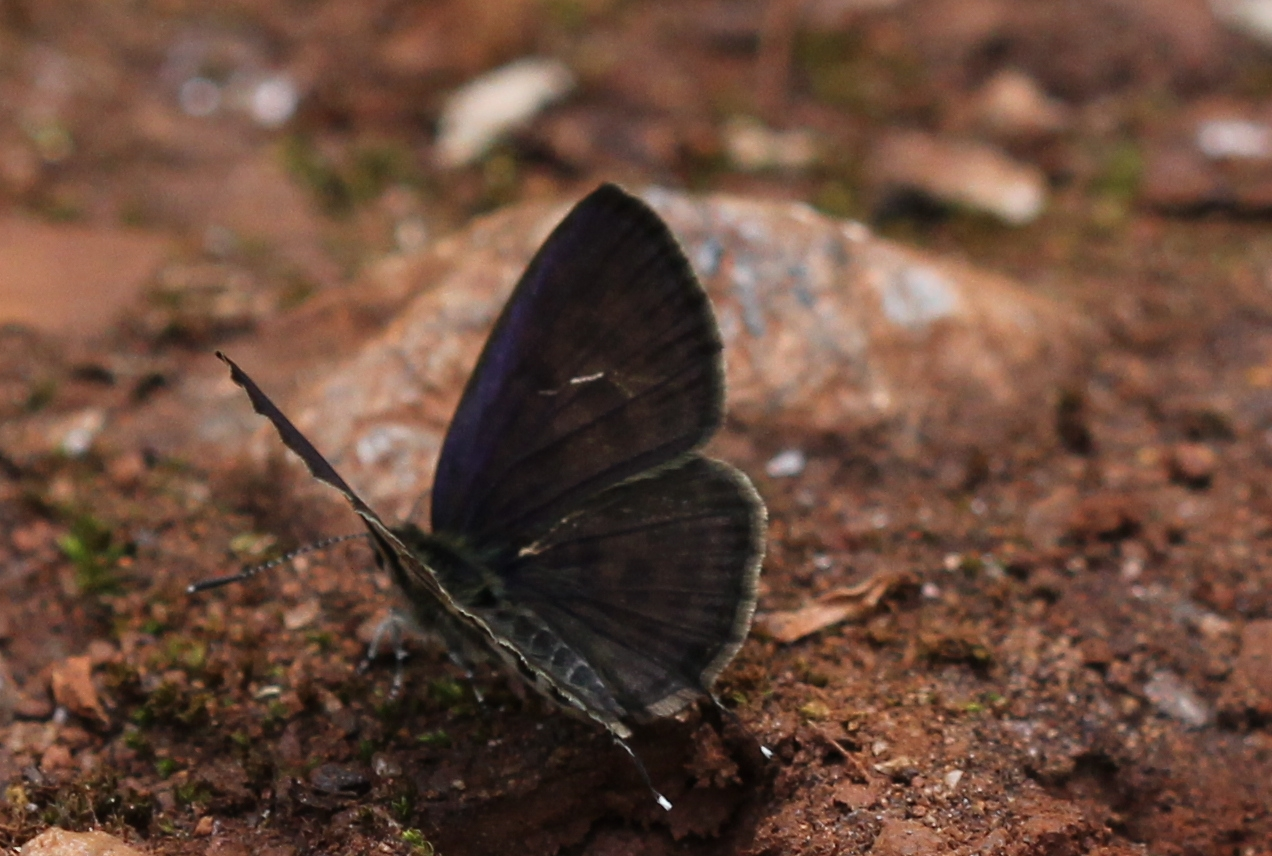
Dorsal view

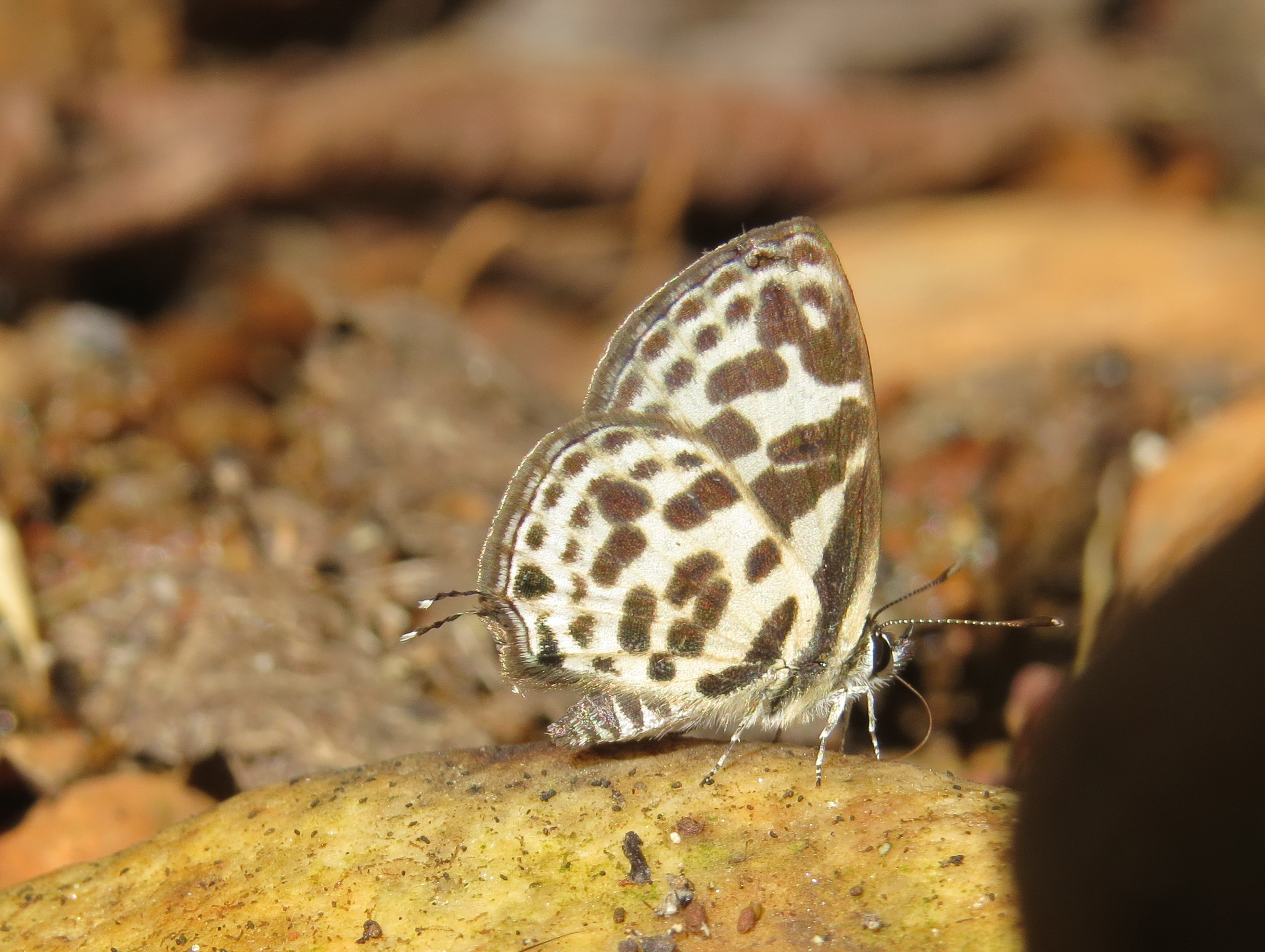
Ventral view

===== Tarucus callinara (spotted Pierrot) =====
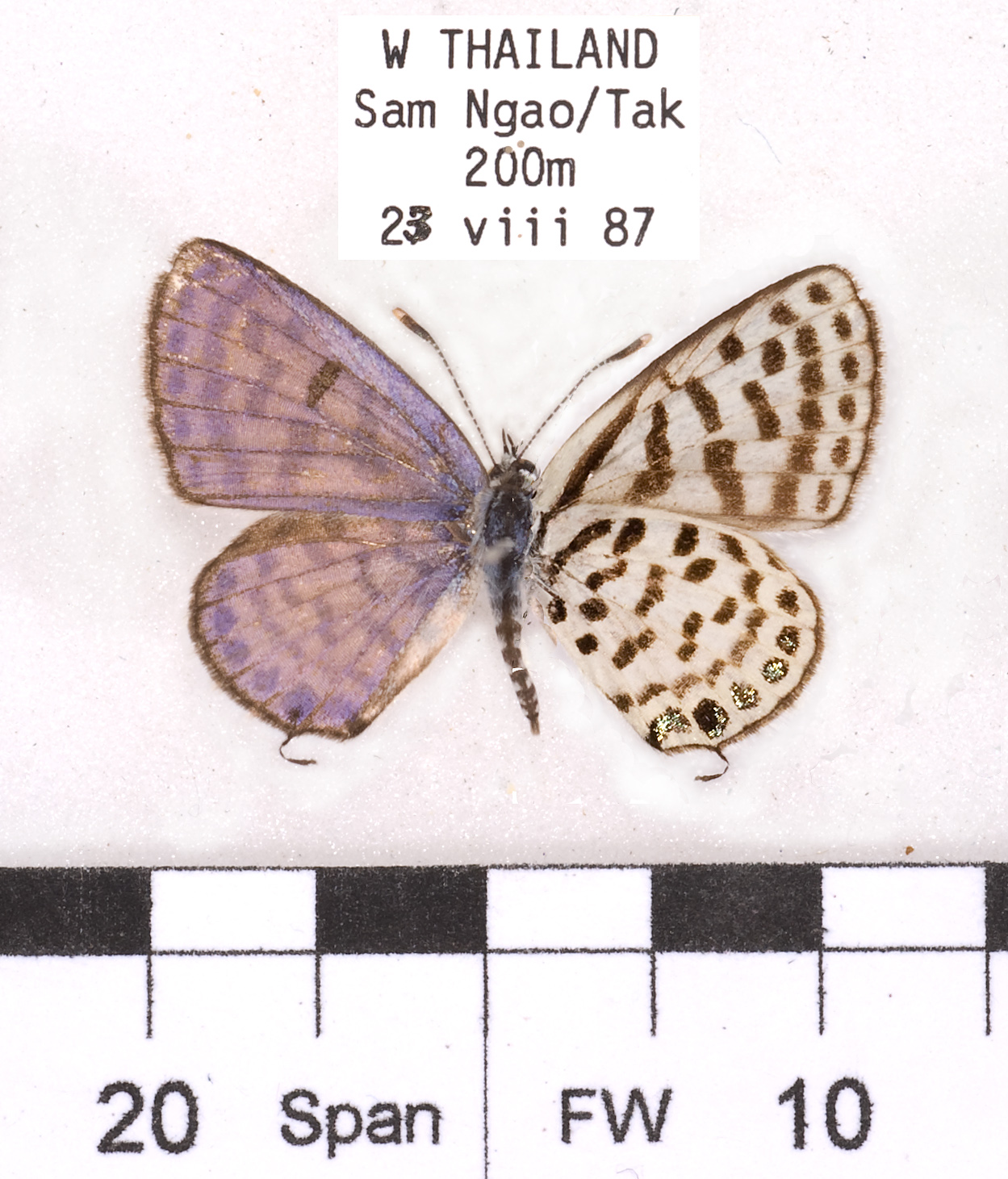
Museum specimen

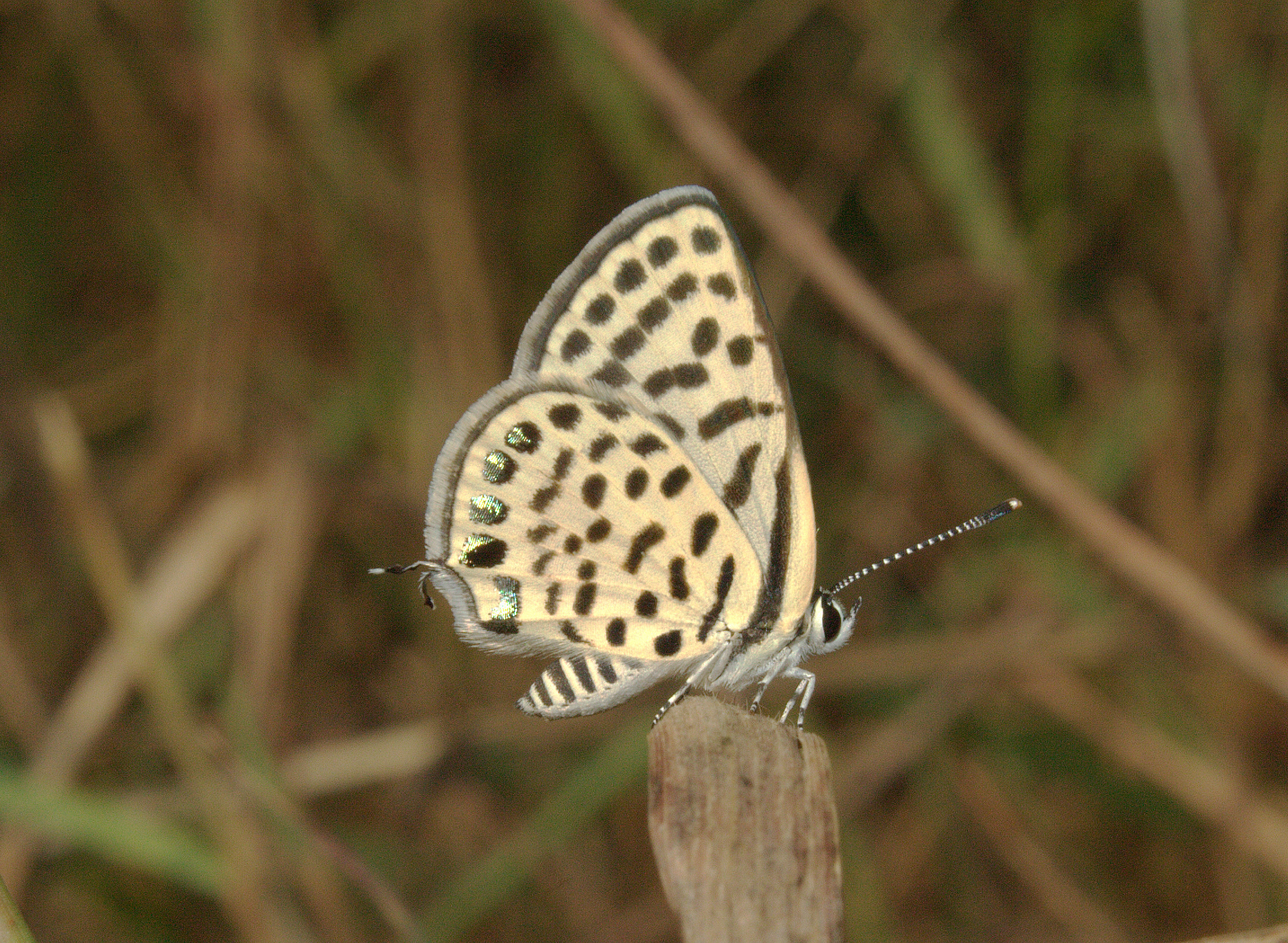
Ventral view

===== Tarucus nara (striped Pierrot) =====
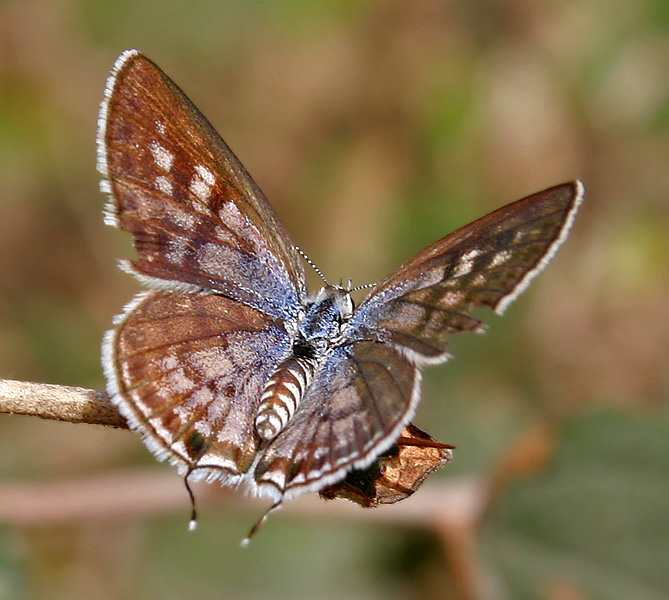
Dorsal view

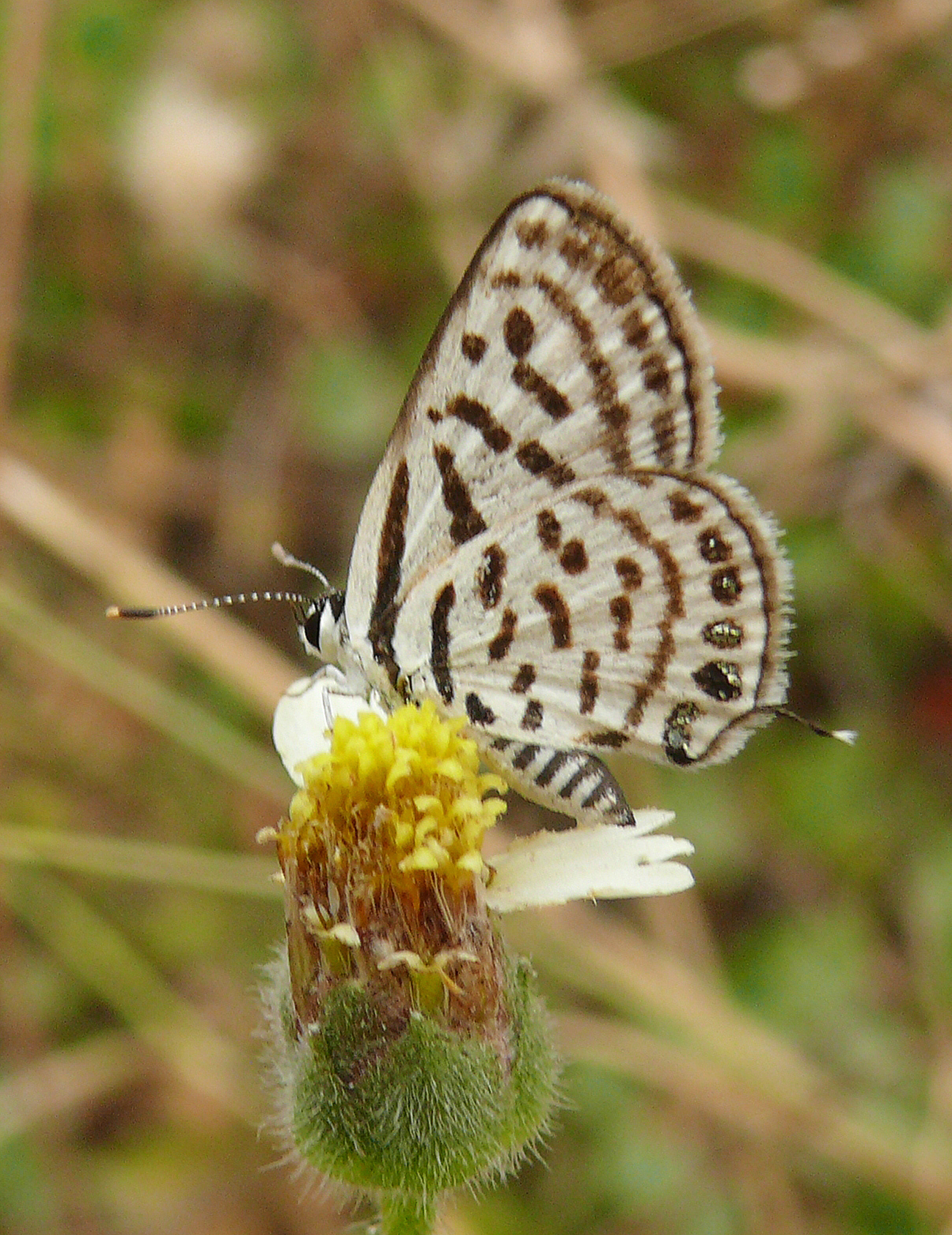
Ventral view

==== Genus: Udara ====
===== Udara akasa (white hedge blue) =====
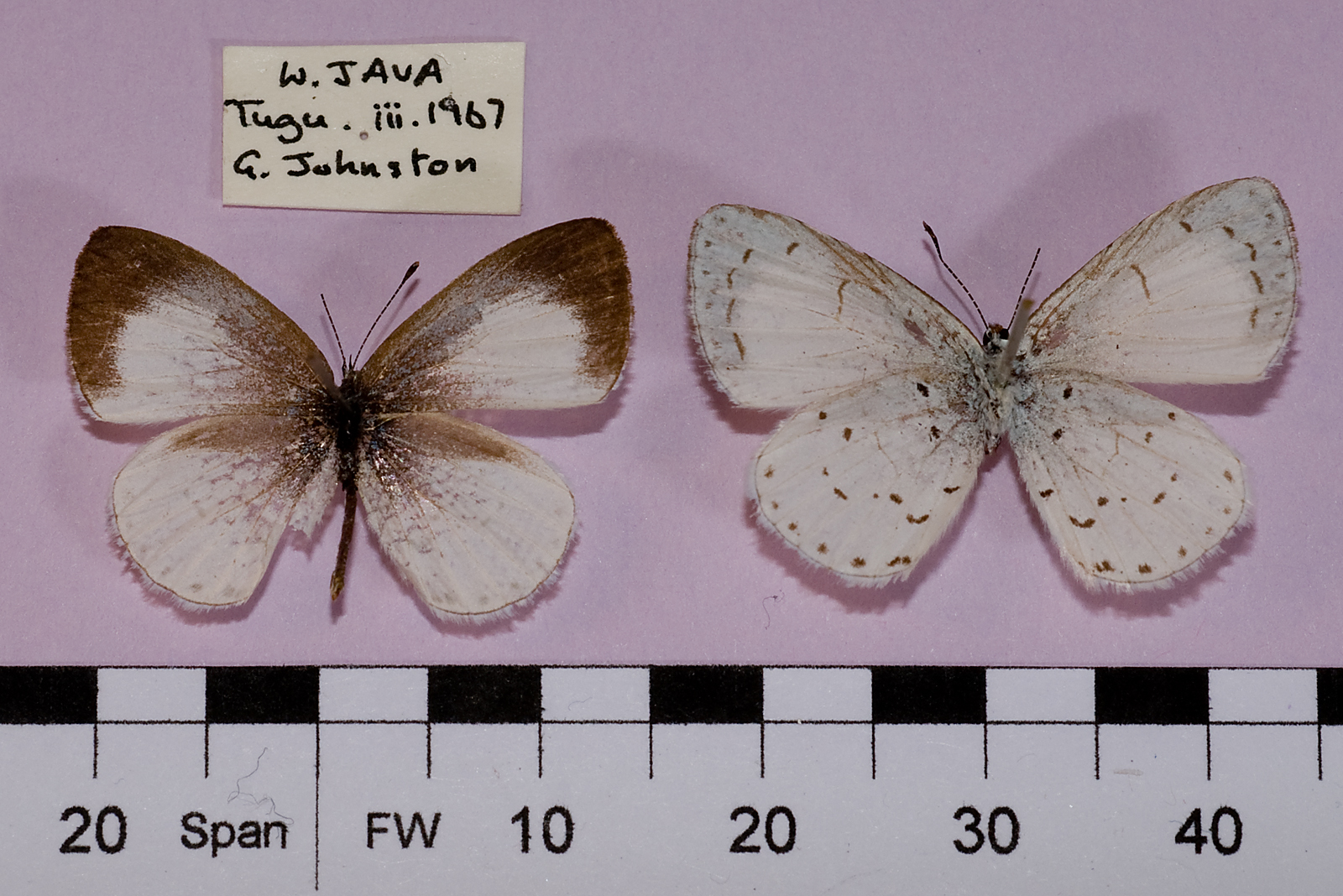
Museum specimen

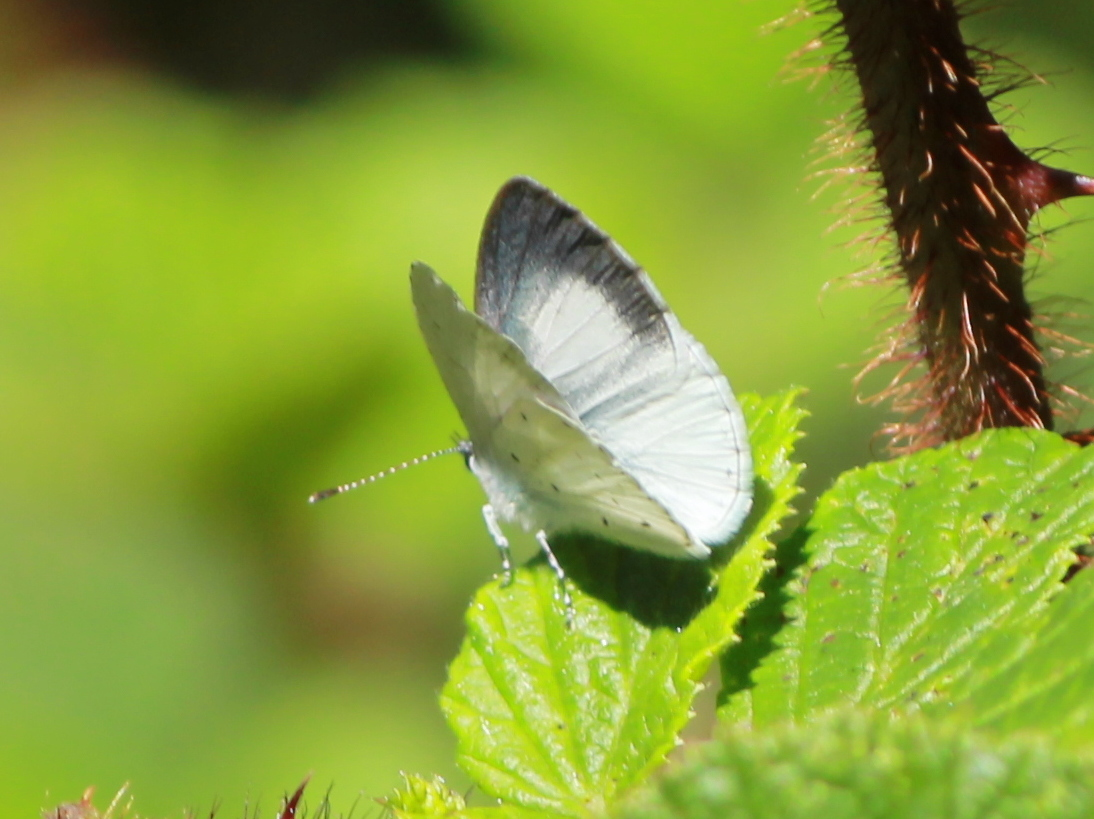
Dorsal view

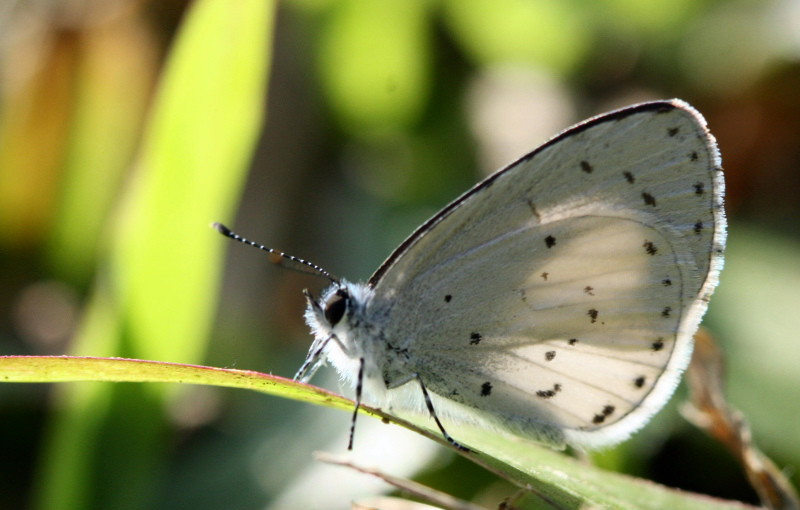
Ventral view

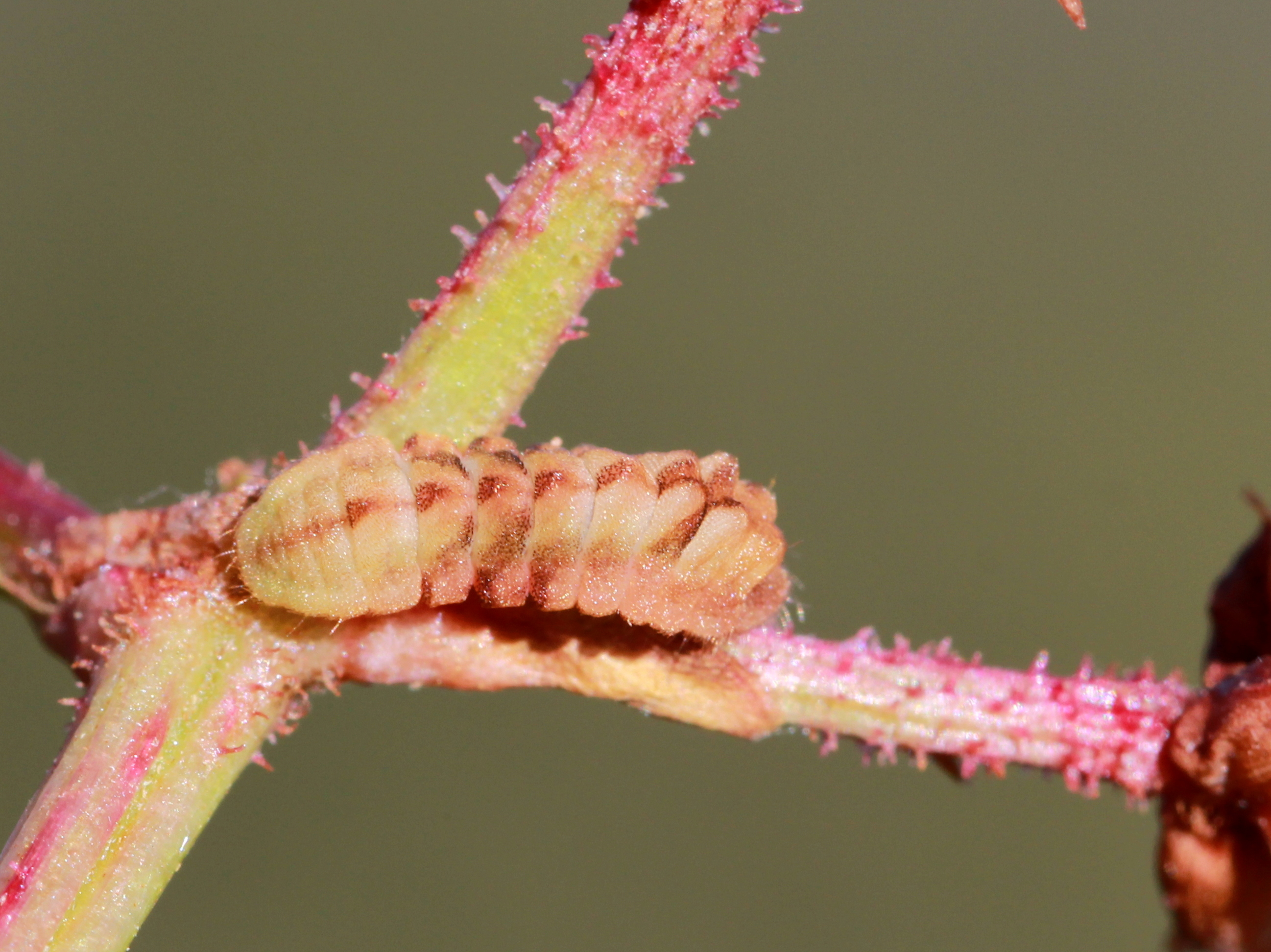
Larva

==== Genus: Zizeeria ====
===== Zizeeria karsandra (dark grass blue) =====
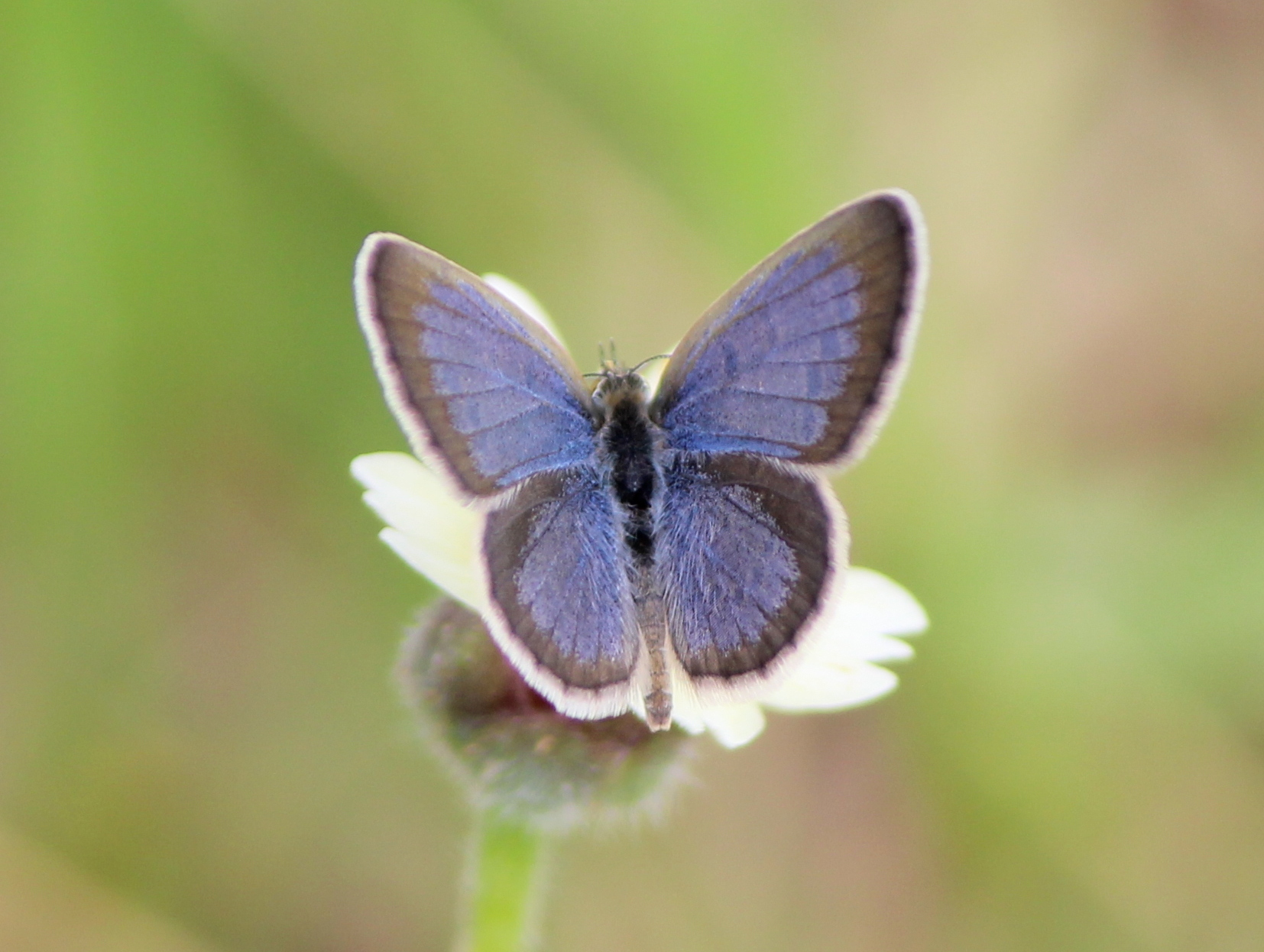
Dorsal view (male)

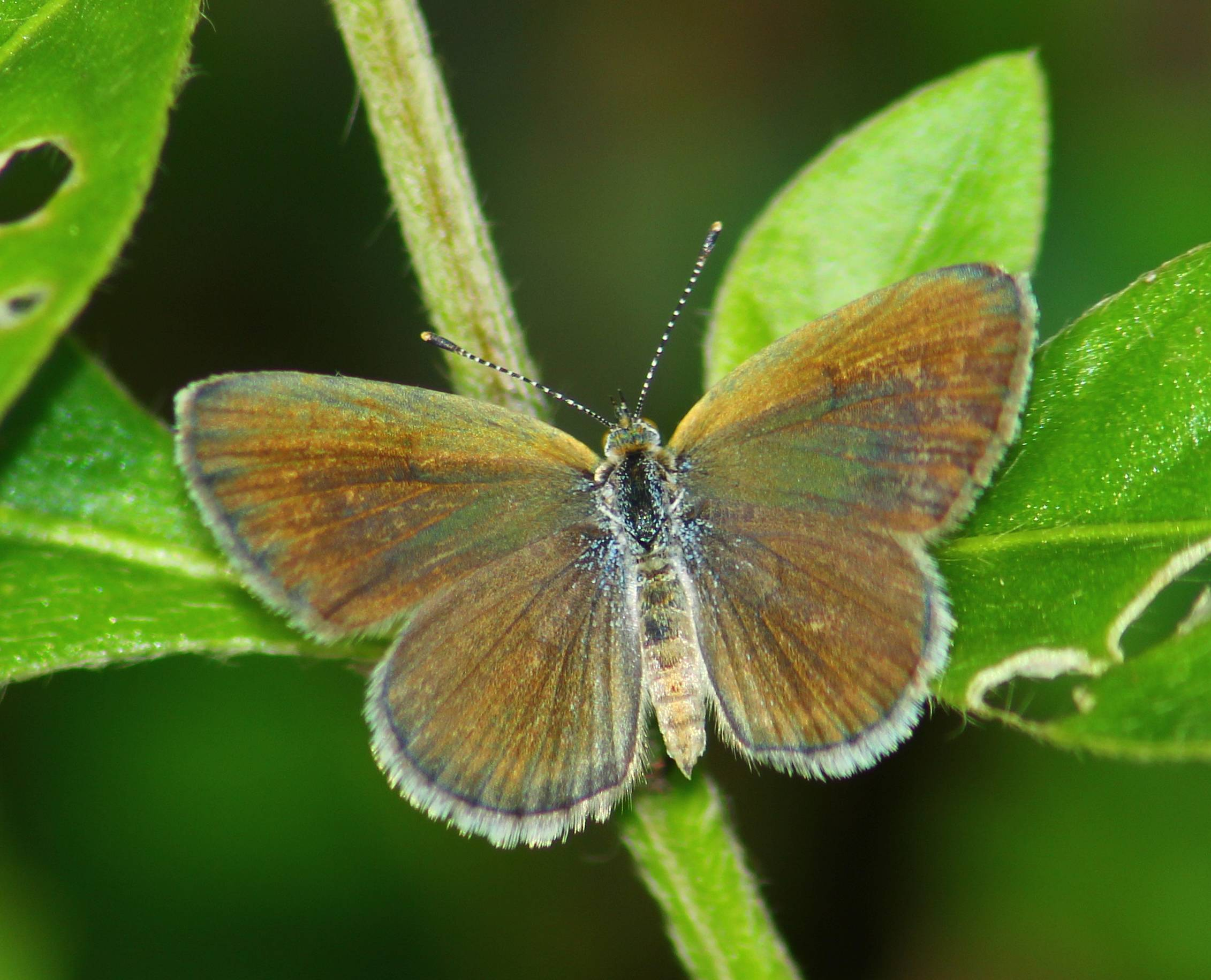
Dorsal view (female)

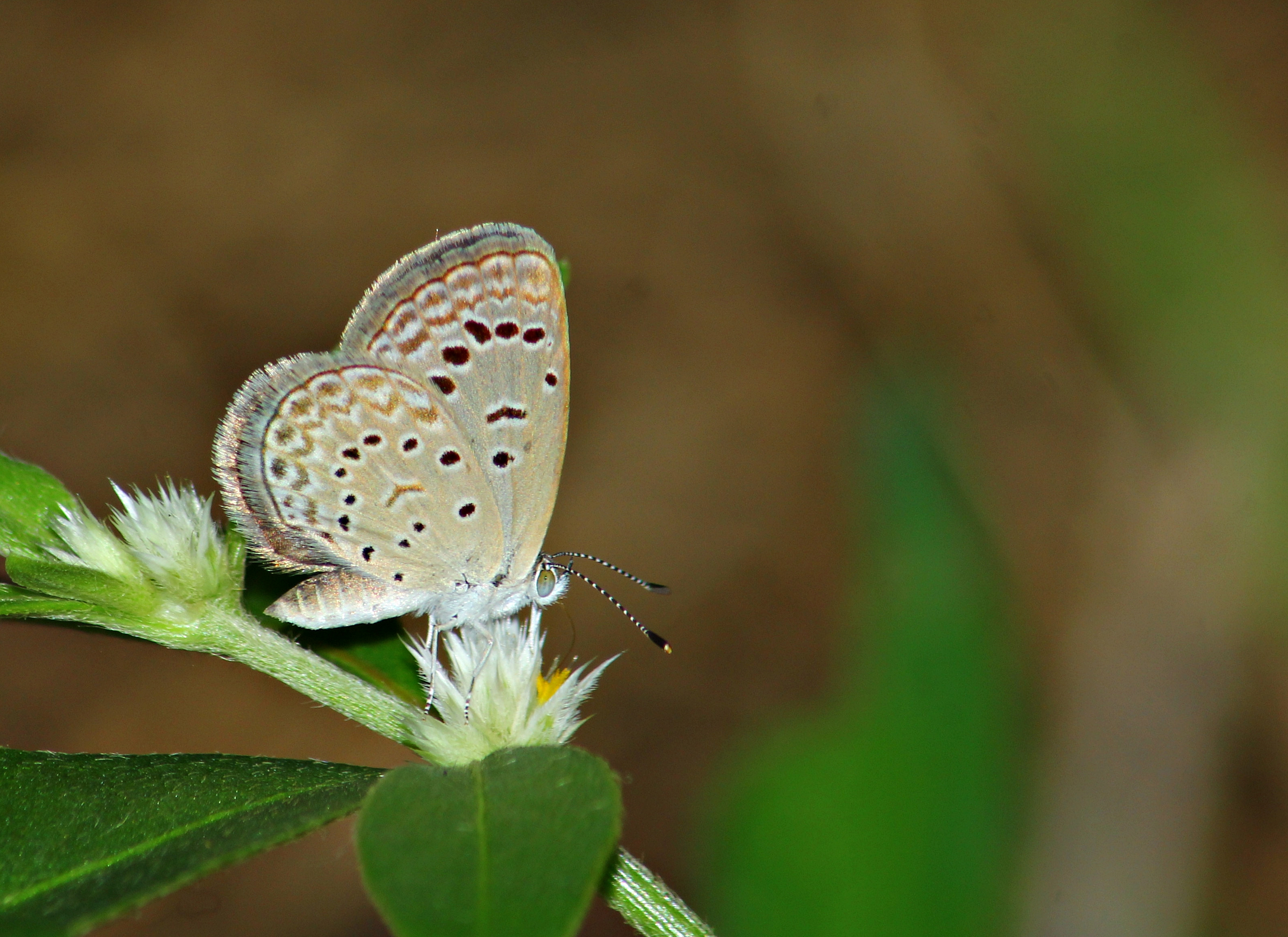
Ventral view

==== Genus: Zizina ====
===== Zizina otis (lesser grass blue) =====
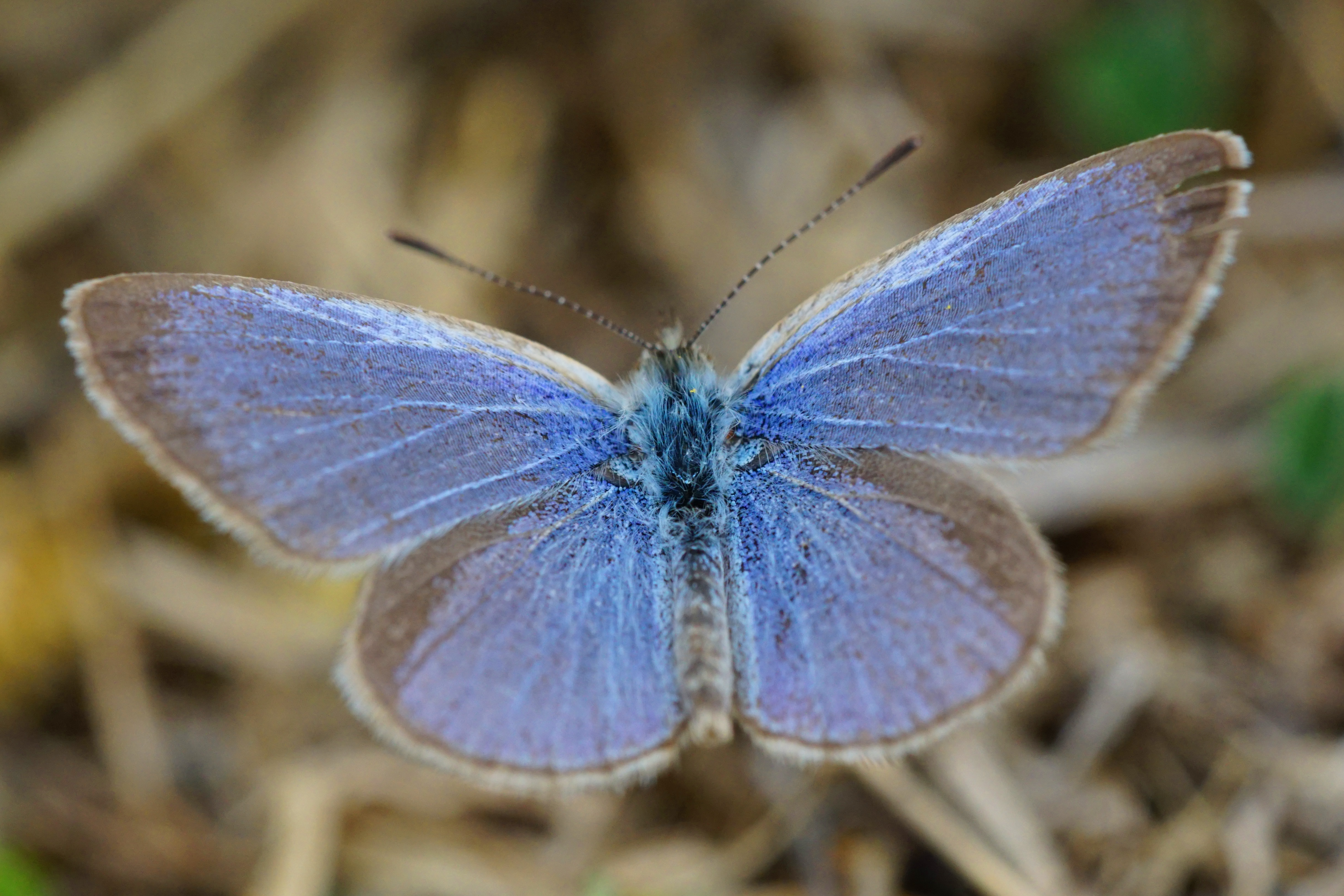
Dorsal view (male)

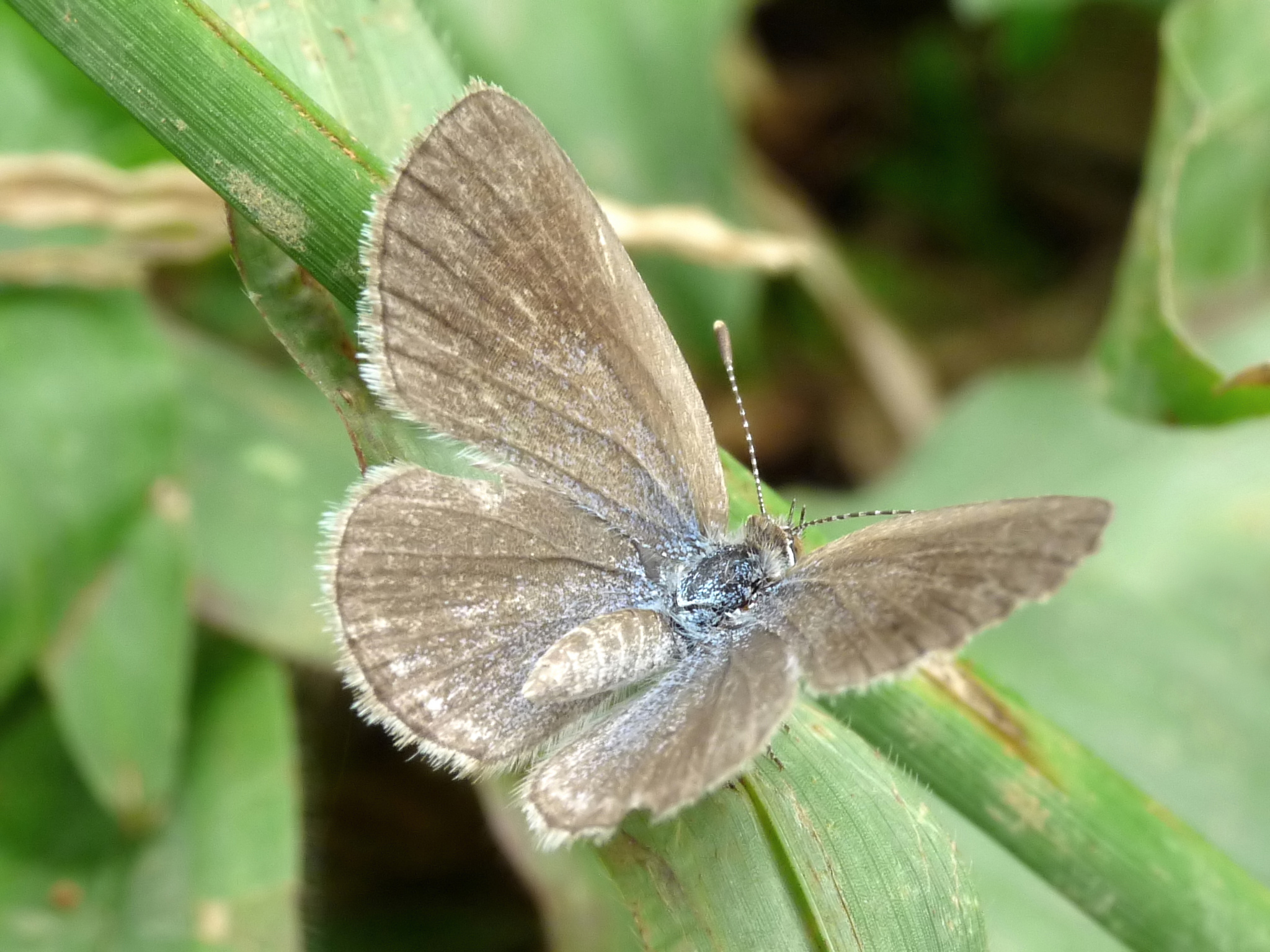
Dorsal view (female)

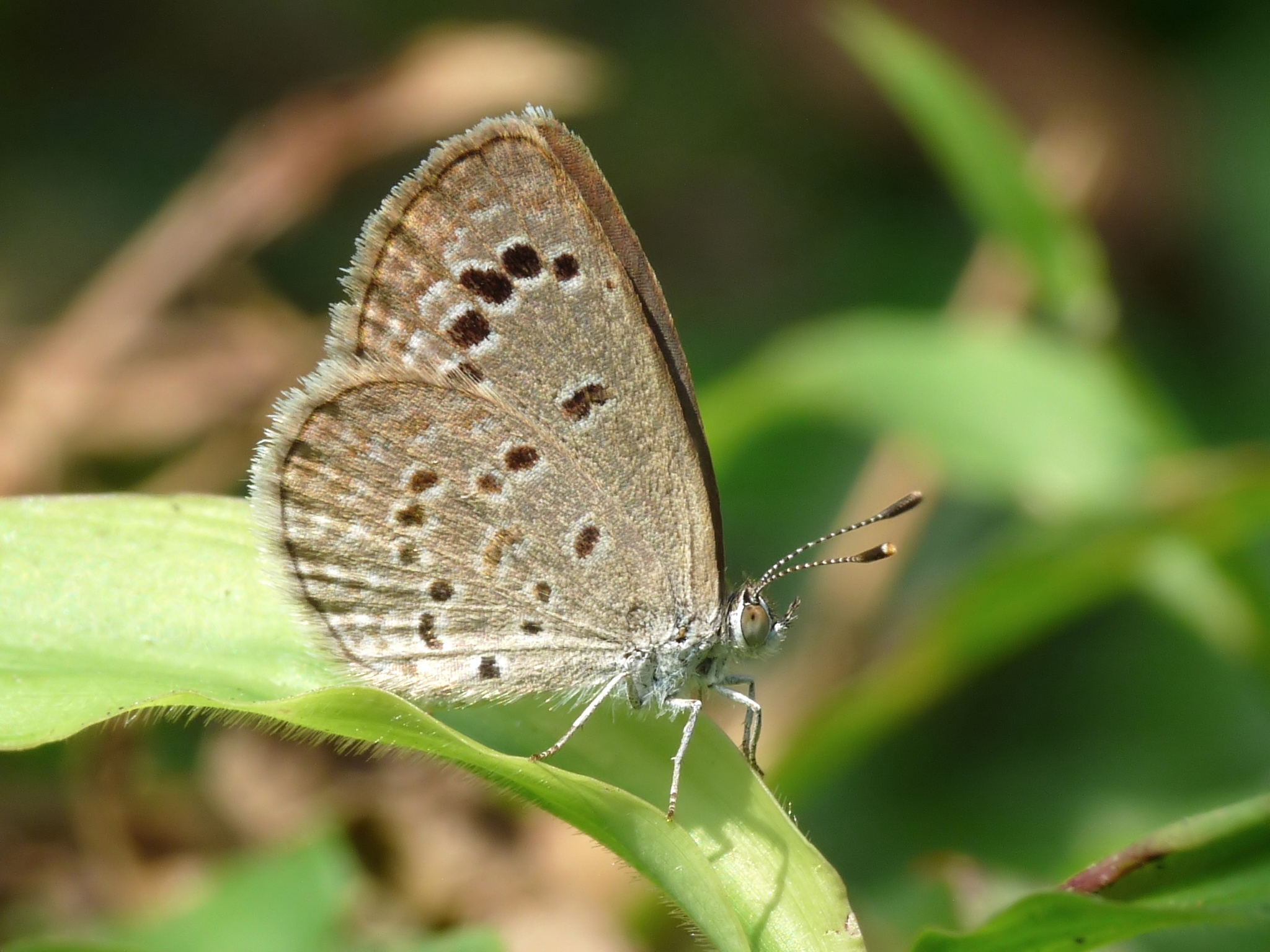
Ventral view

==== Genus: Zizula ====
===== Zizula hylax (tiny grass blue) =====
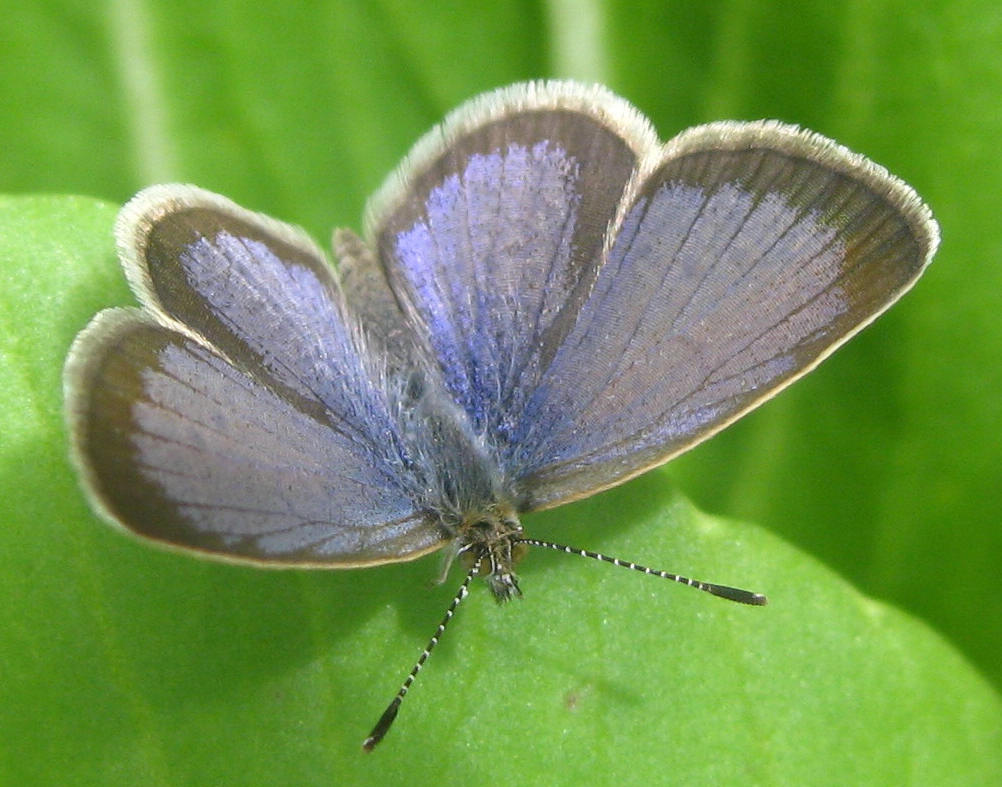
Dorsal view

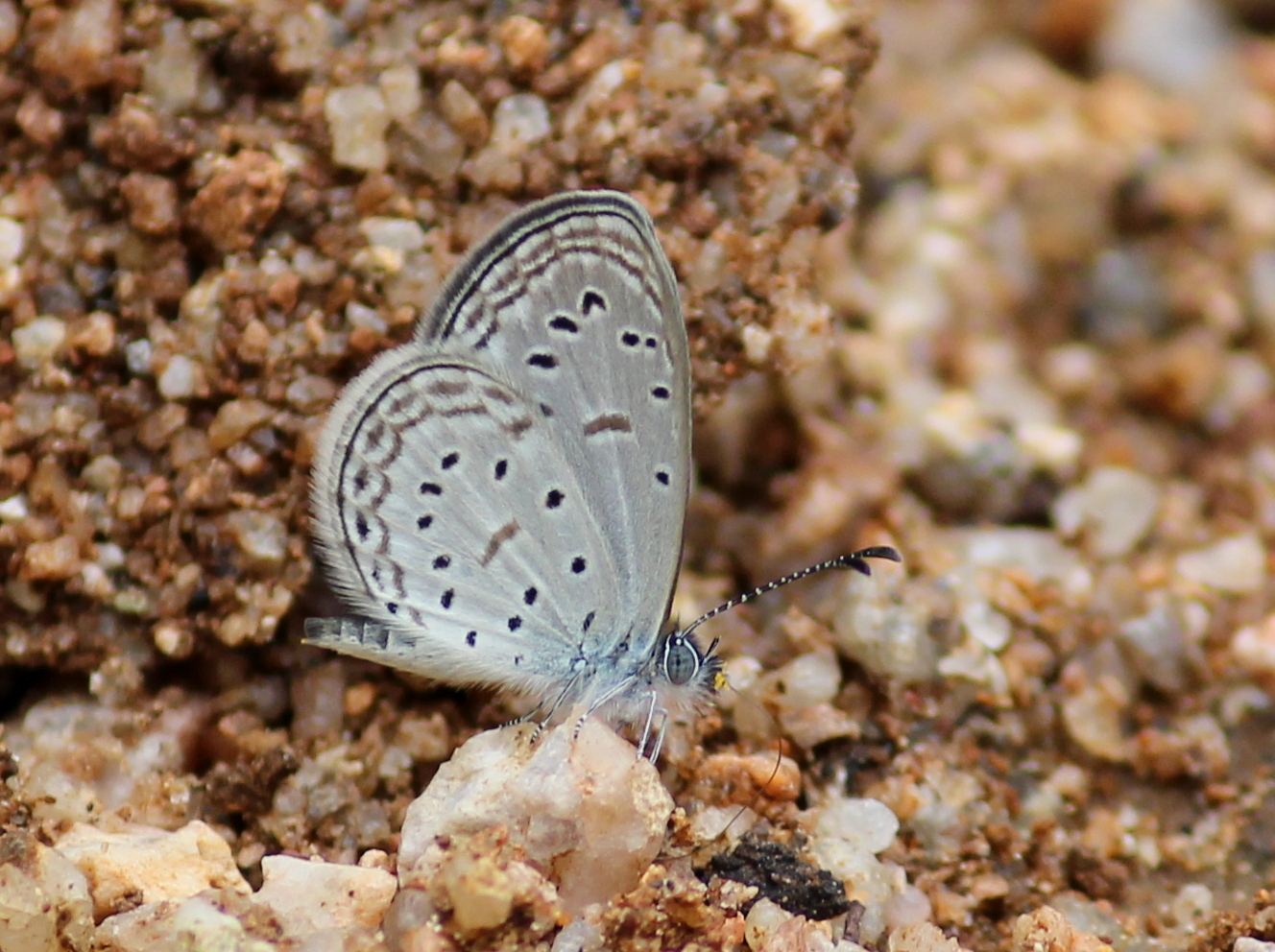
Ventral view

=== Subfamily: Theclinae ===
==== Genus: Amblypodia ====
===== Amblypodia anita (purple leaf blue) =====
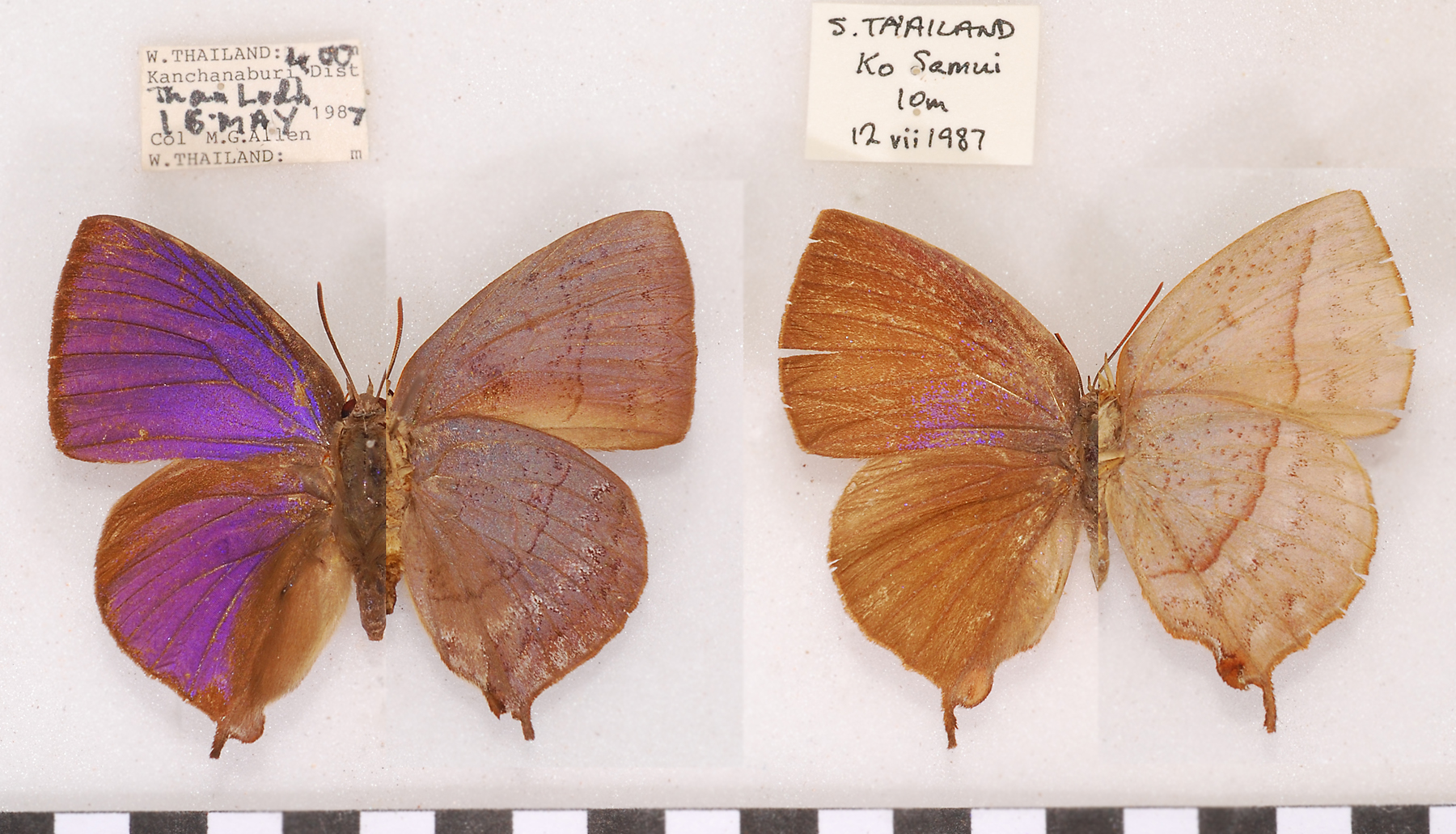
Museum specimen

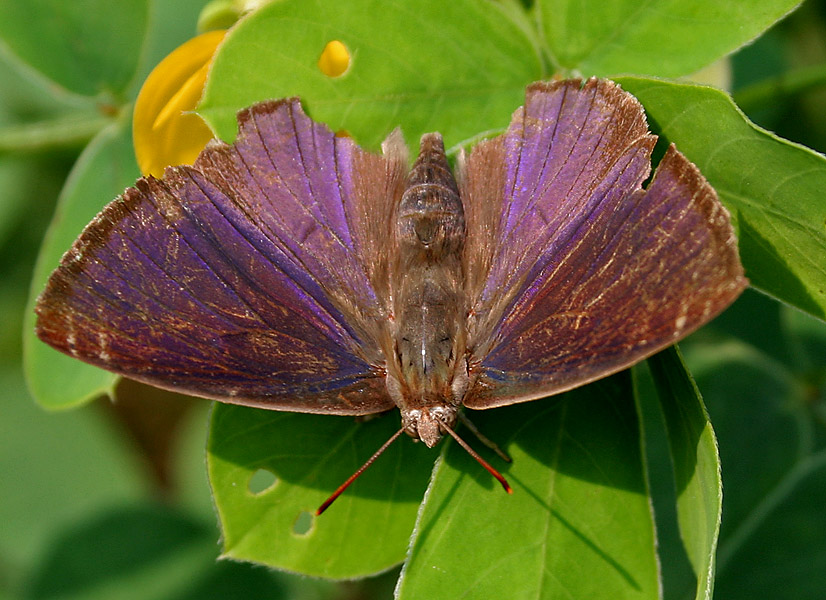
Dorsal view

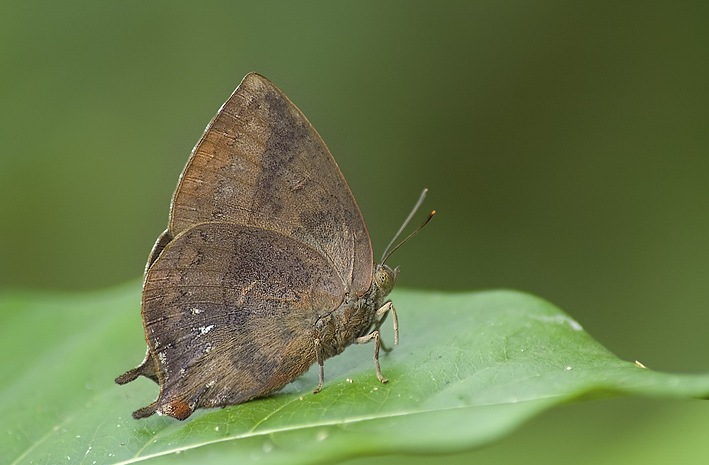
Ventral view

==== Genus: Ancema ====
===== Ancema blanka (silver royal) =====
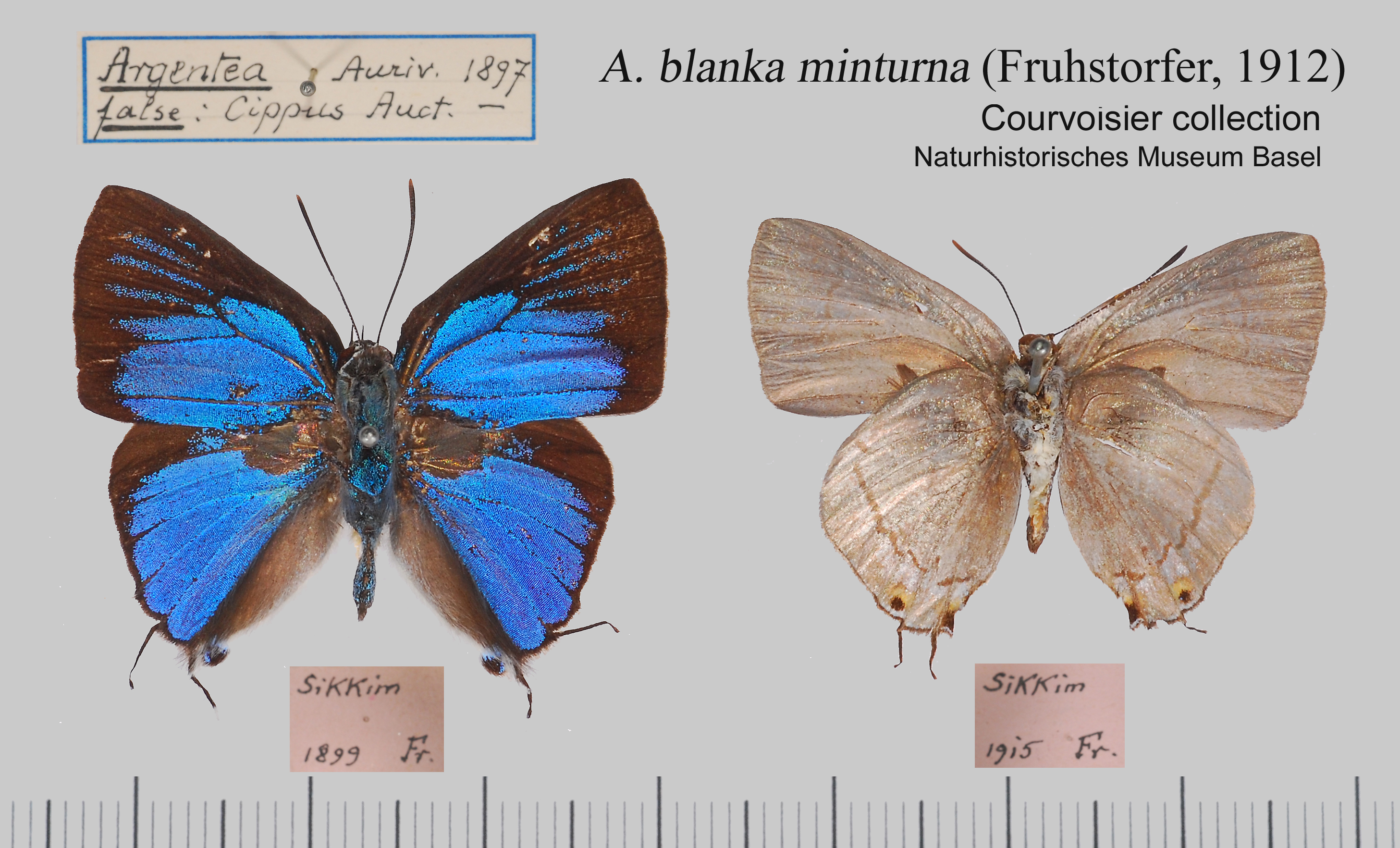
Museum specimen

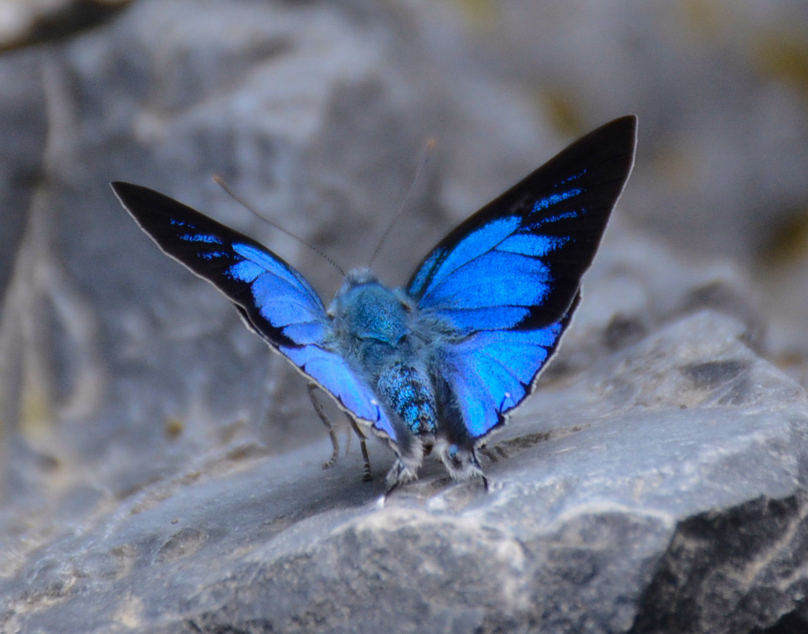
Dorsal view

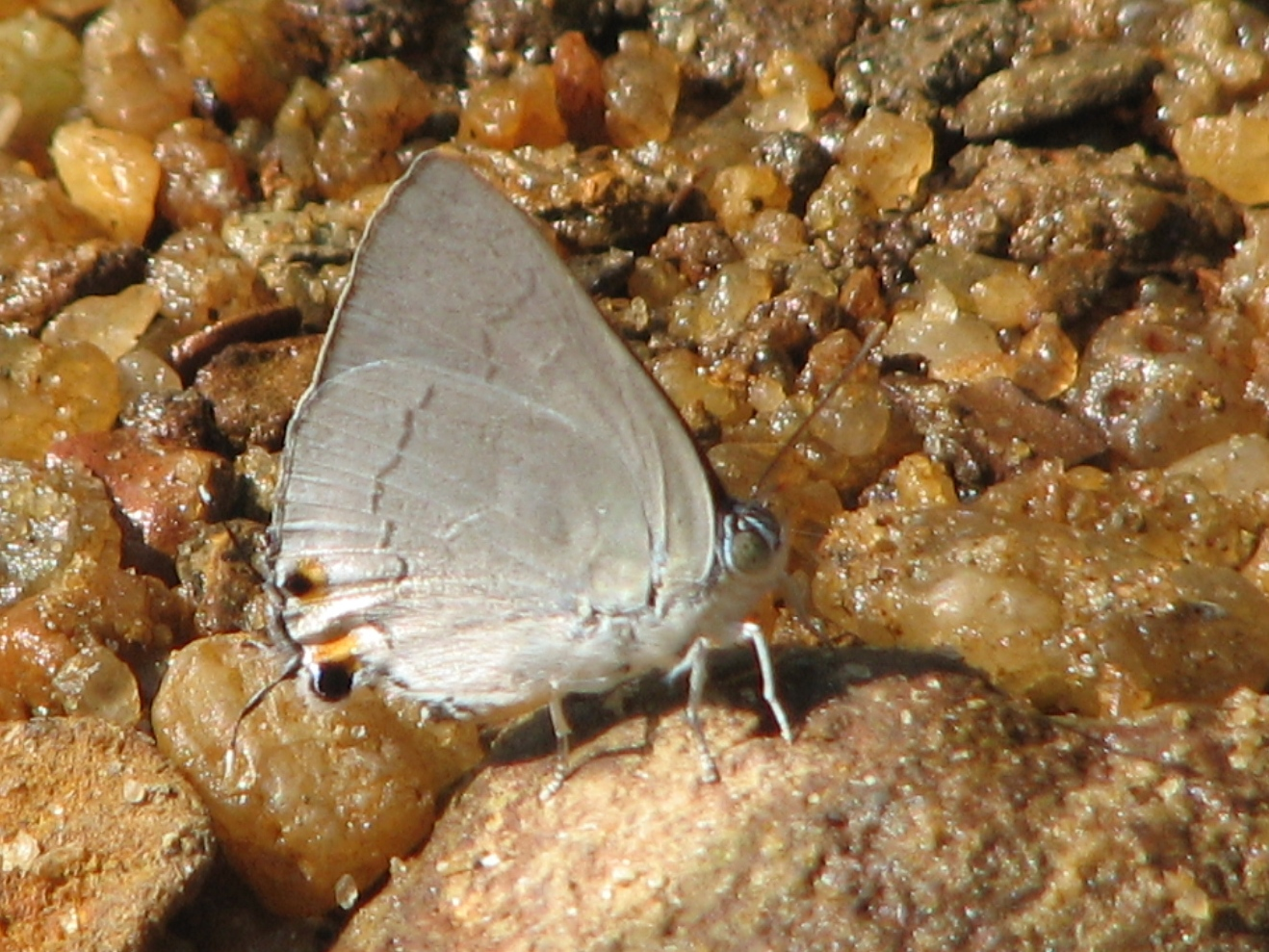
Ventral view

==== Genus: Arhopala ====
===== Arhopala abseus (aberrant oakblue) =====
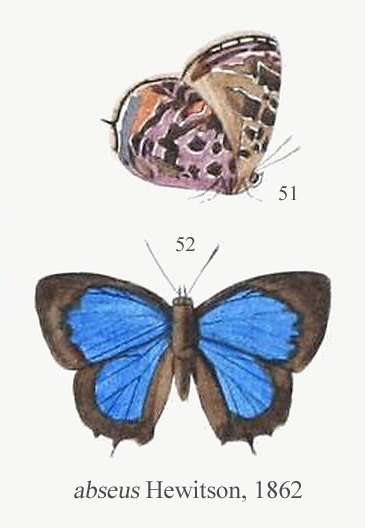
Illustration

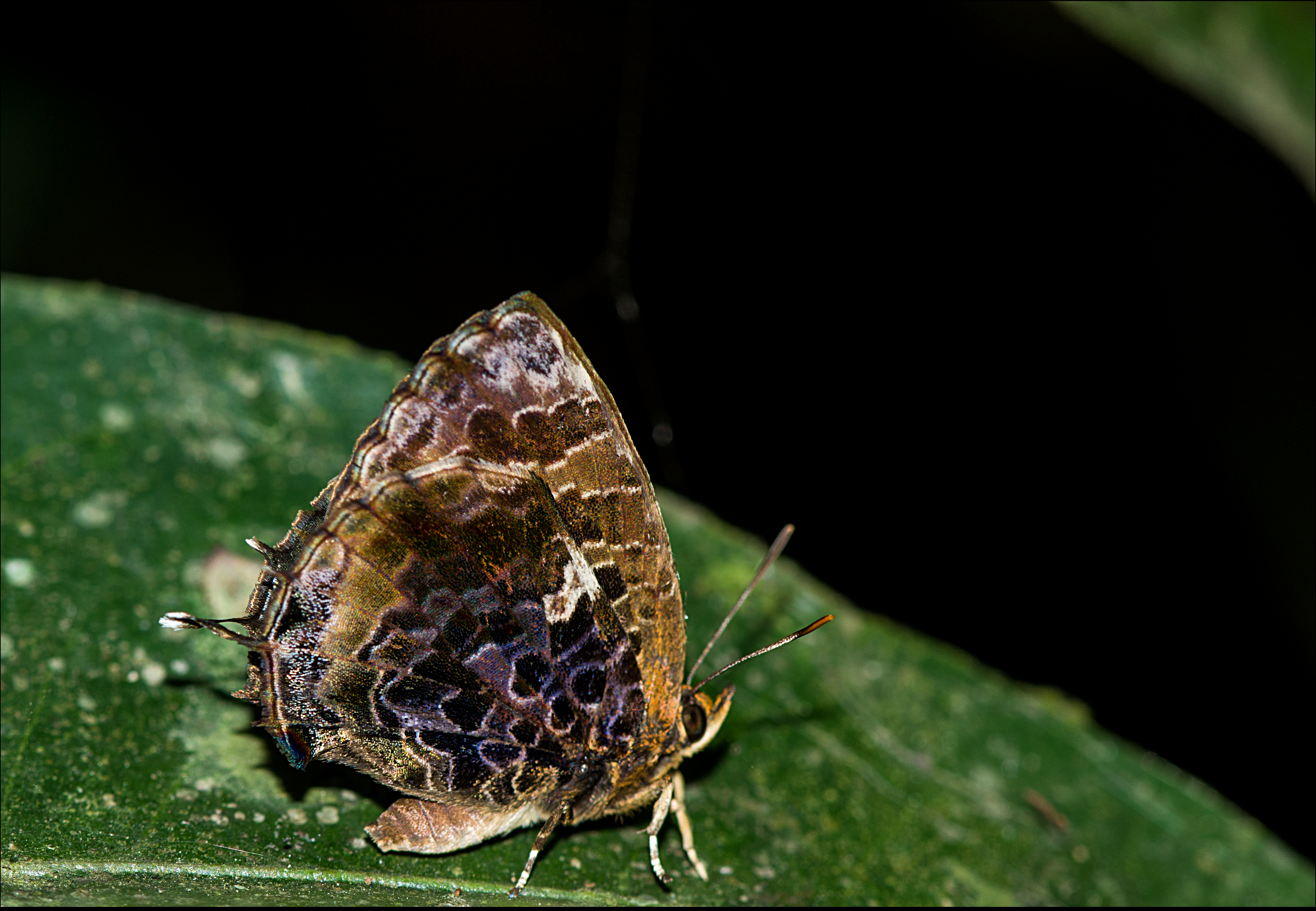
Ventral view

===== Arhopala alea (Kanara oakblue) =====
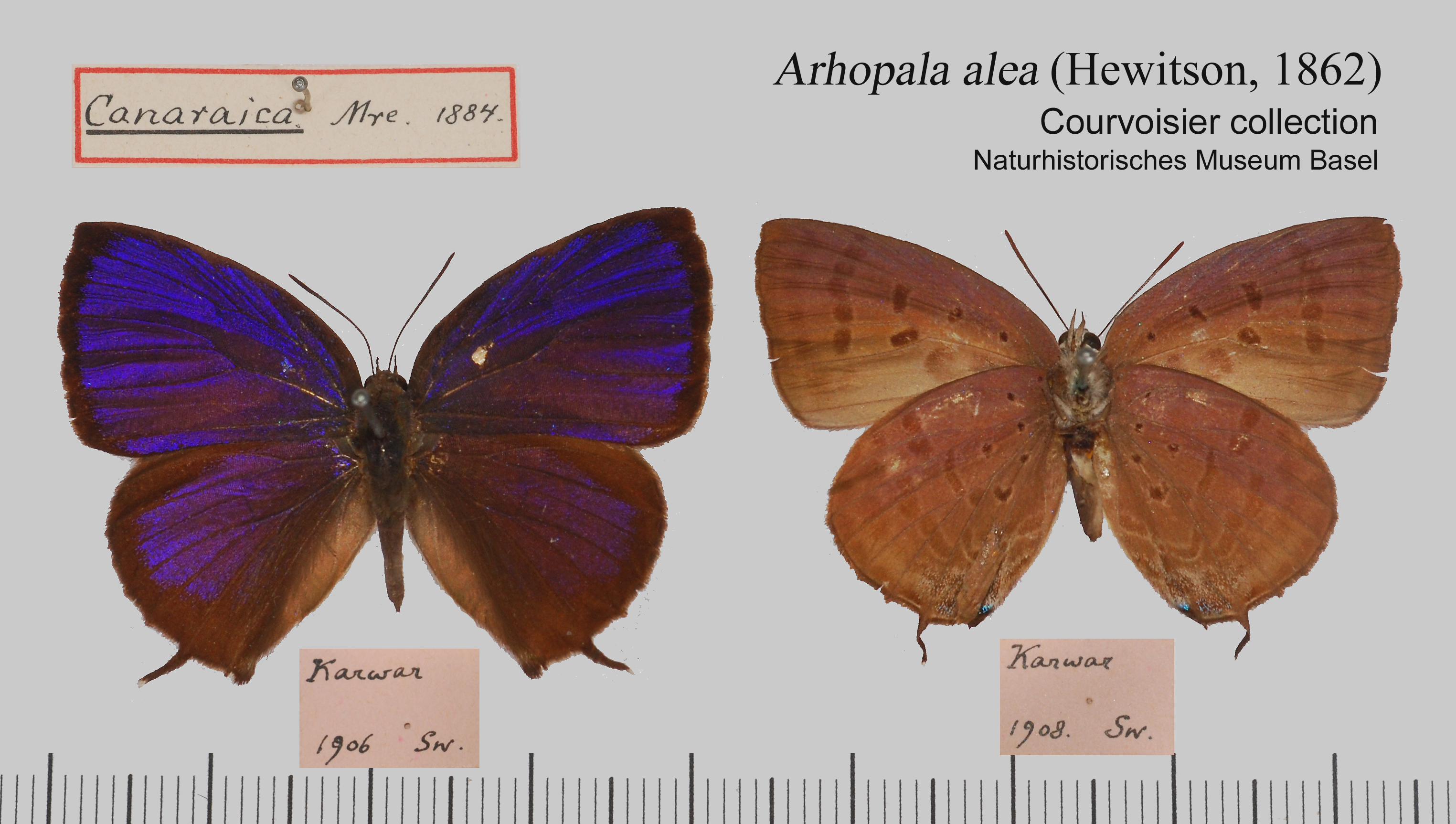
Museum specimen

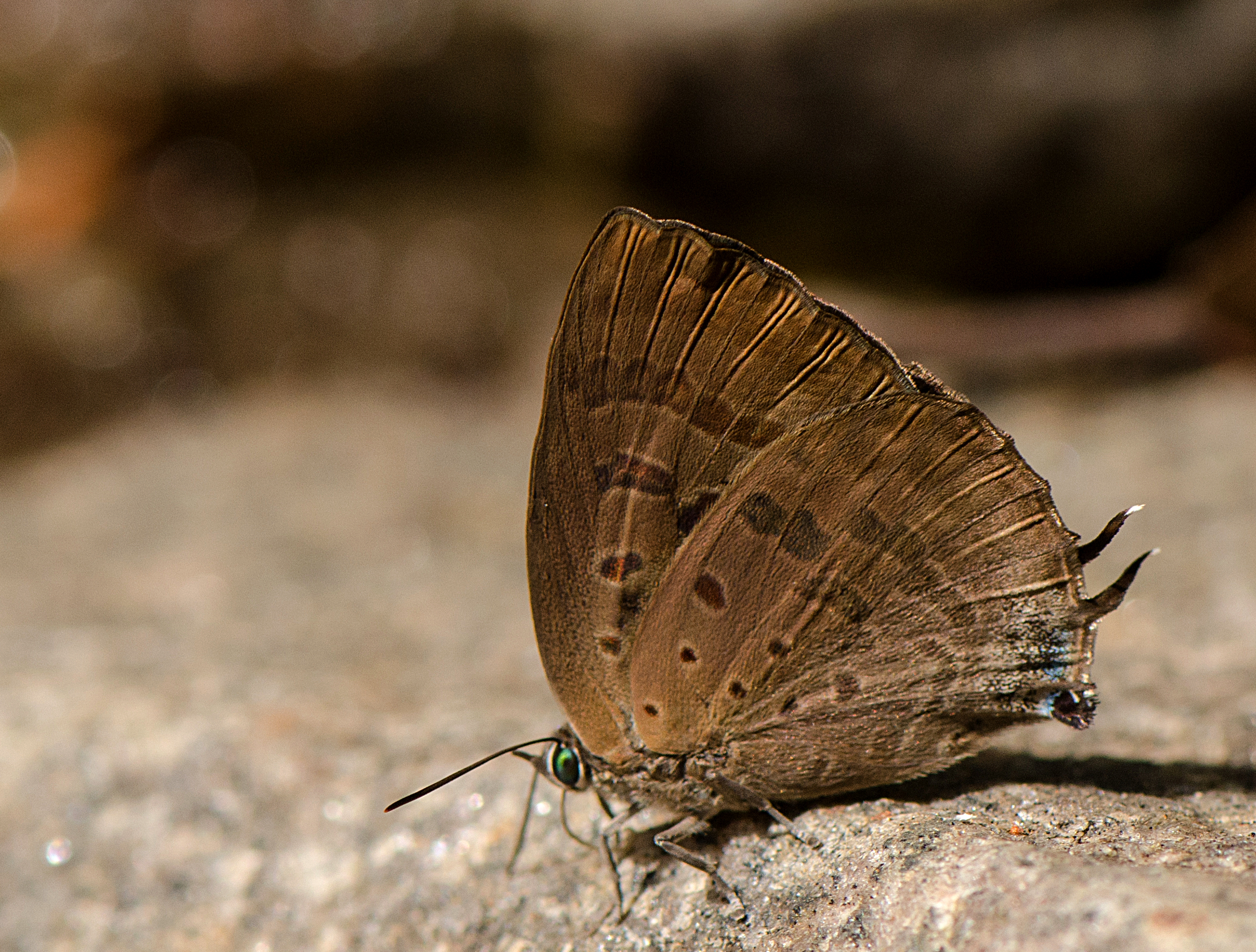
Ventral view

===== Arhopala amantes (large oakblue) =====
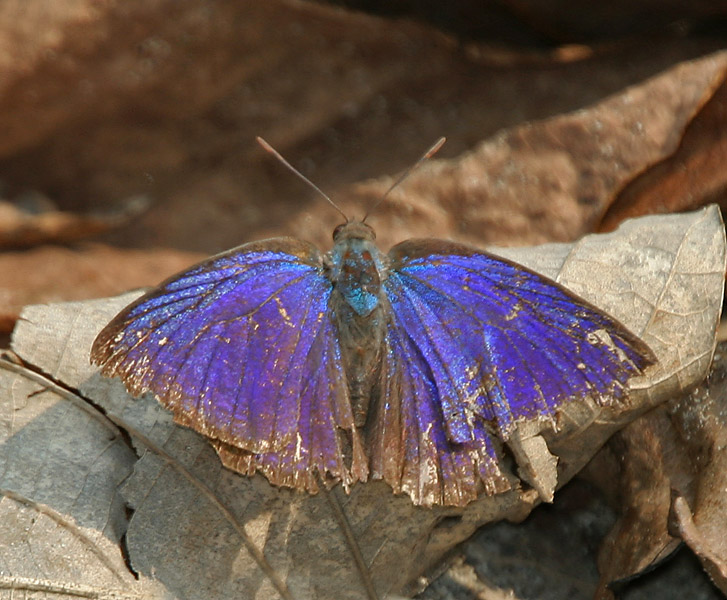
Dorsal view

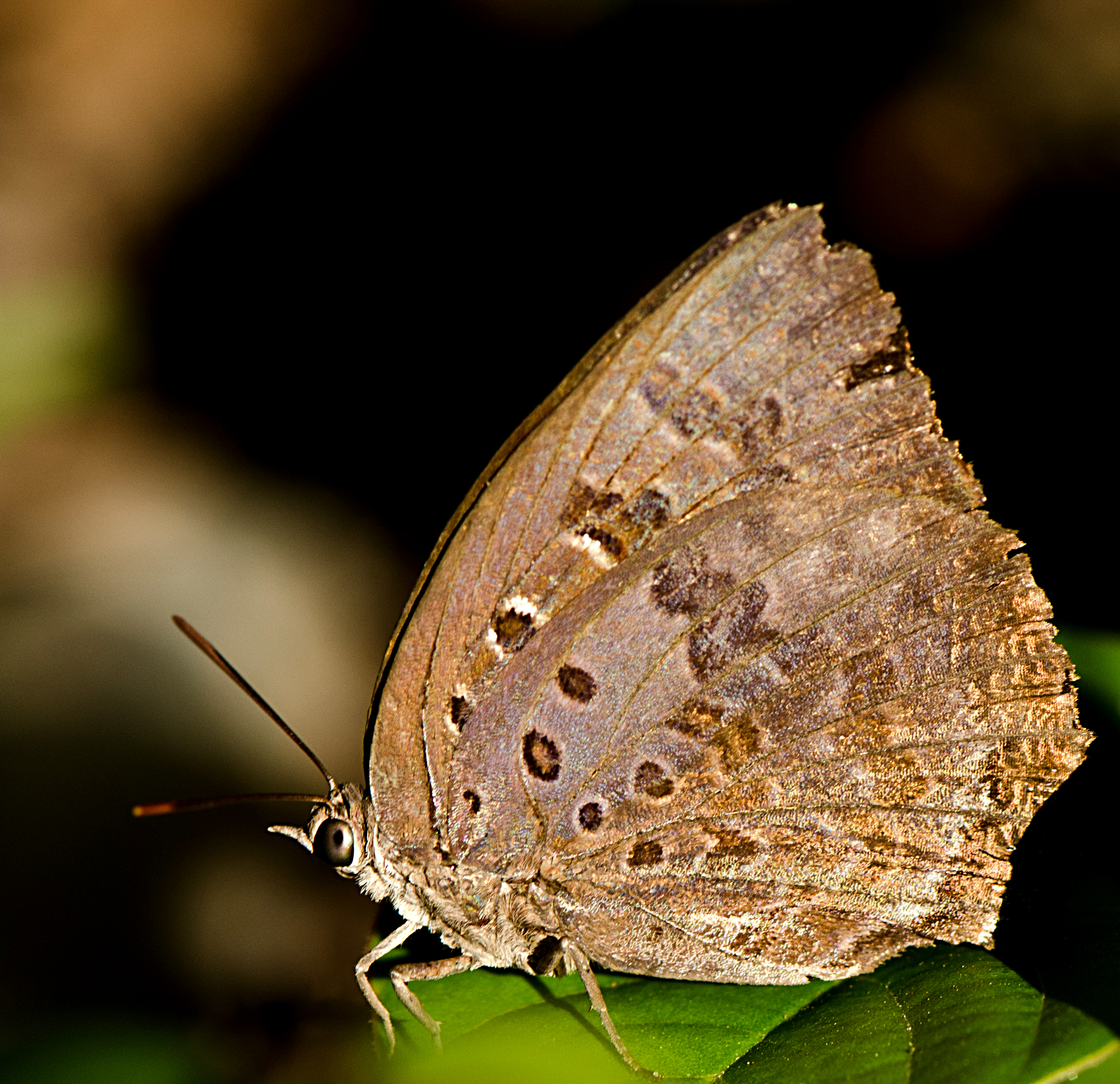
Ventral view

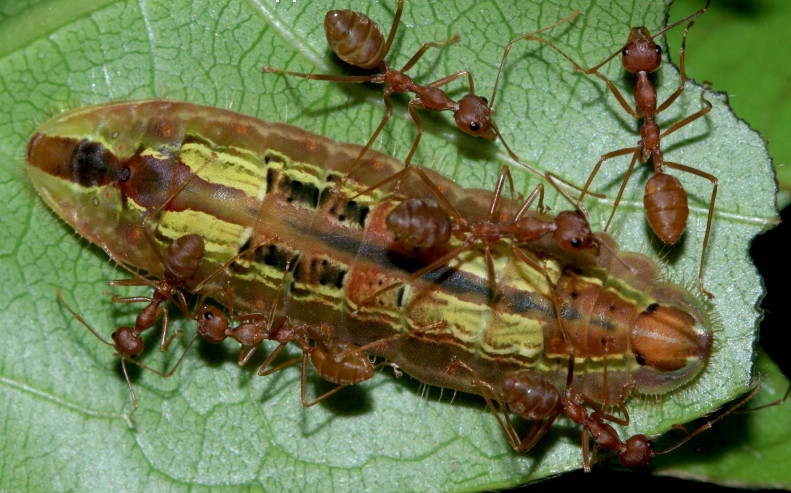
Larva

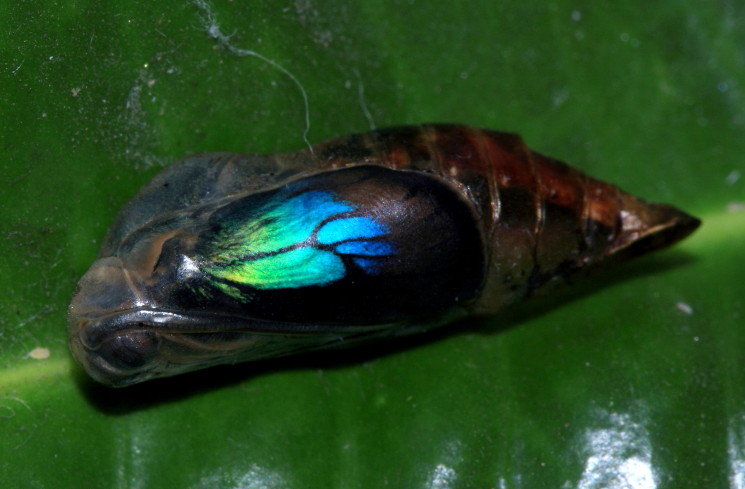
Chrysalis

===== Arhopala atrax (Indian oakblue) =====
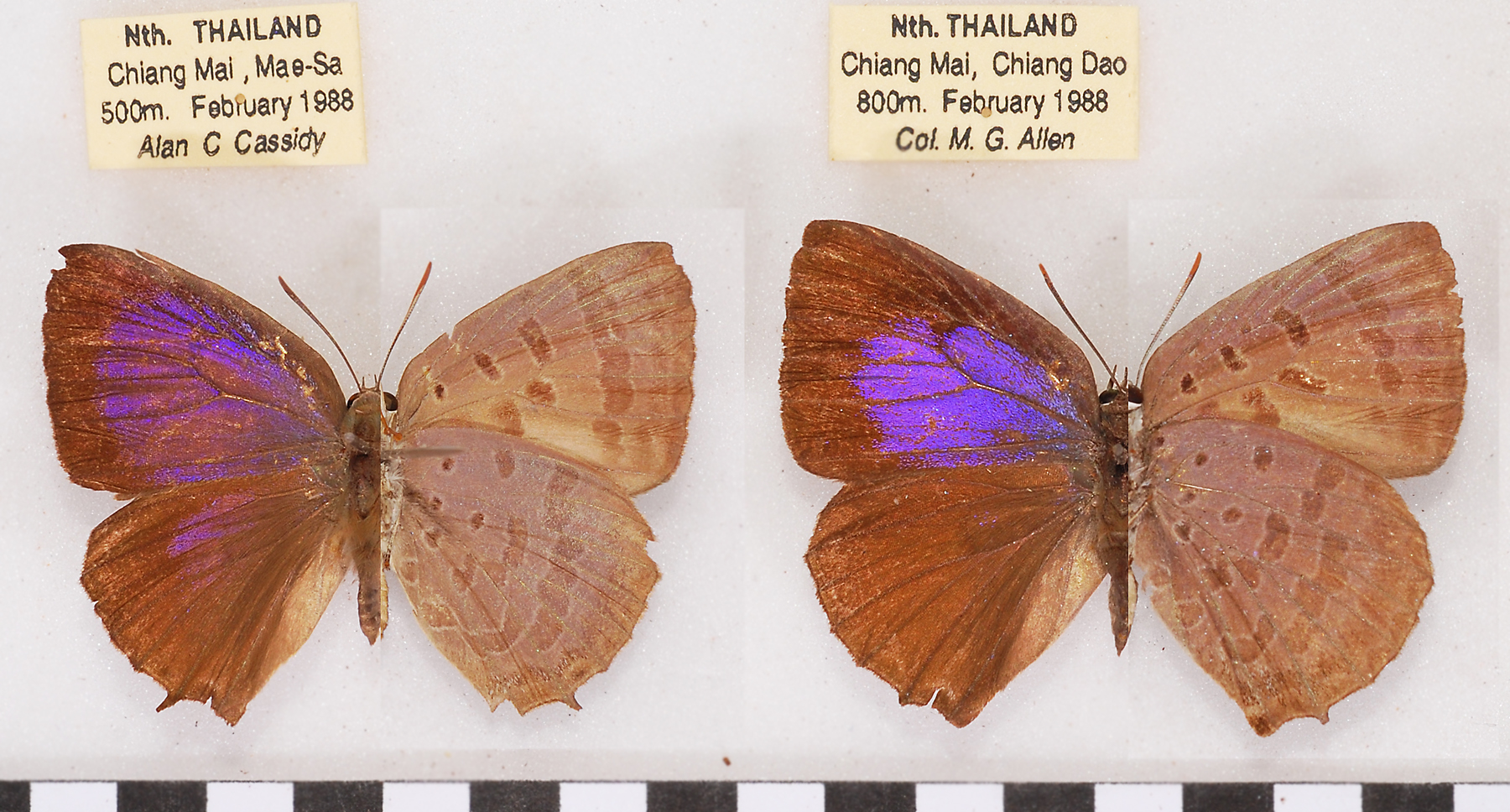
Museum specimen

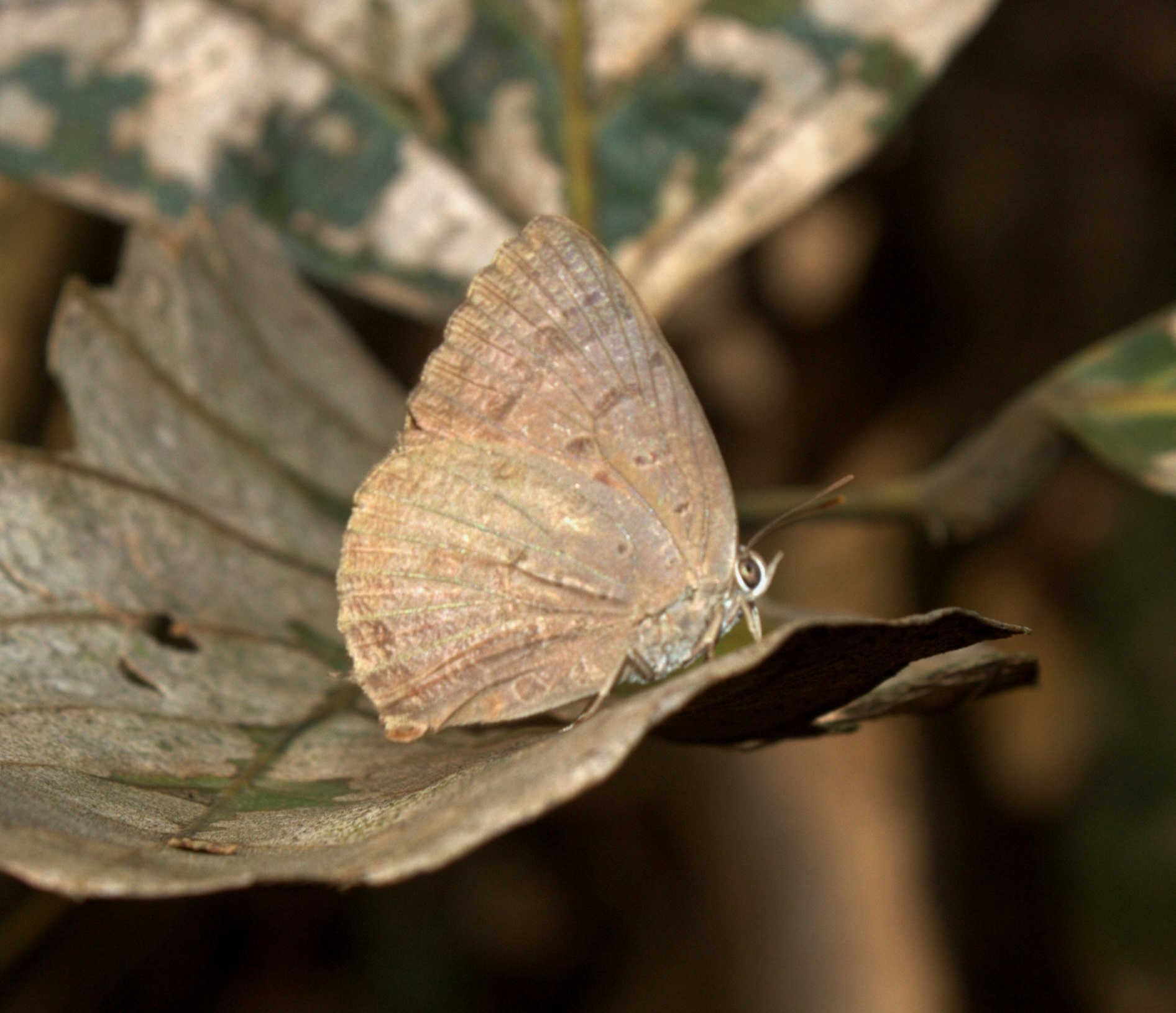
Ventral view

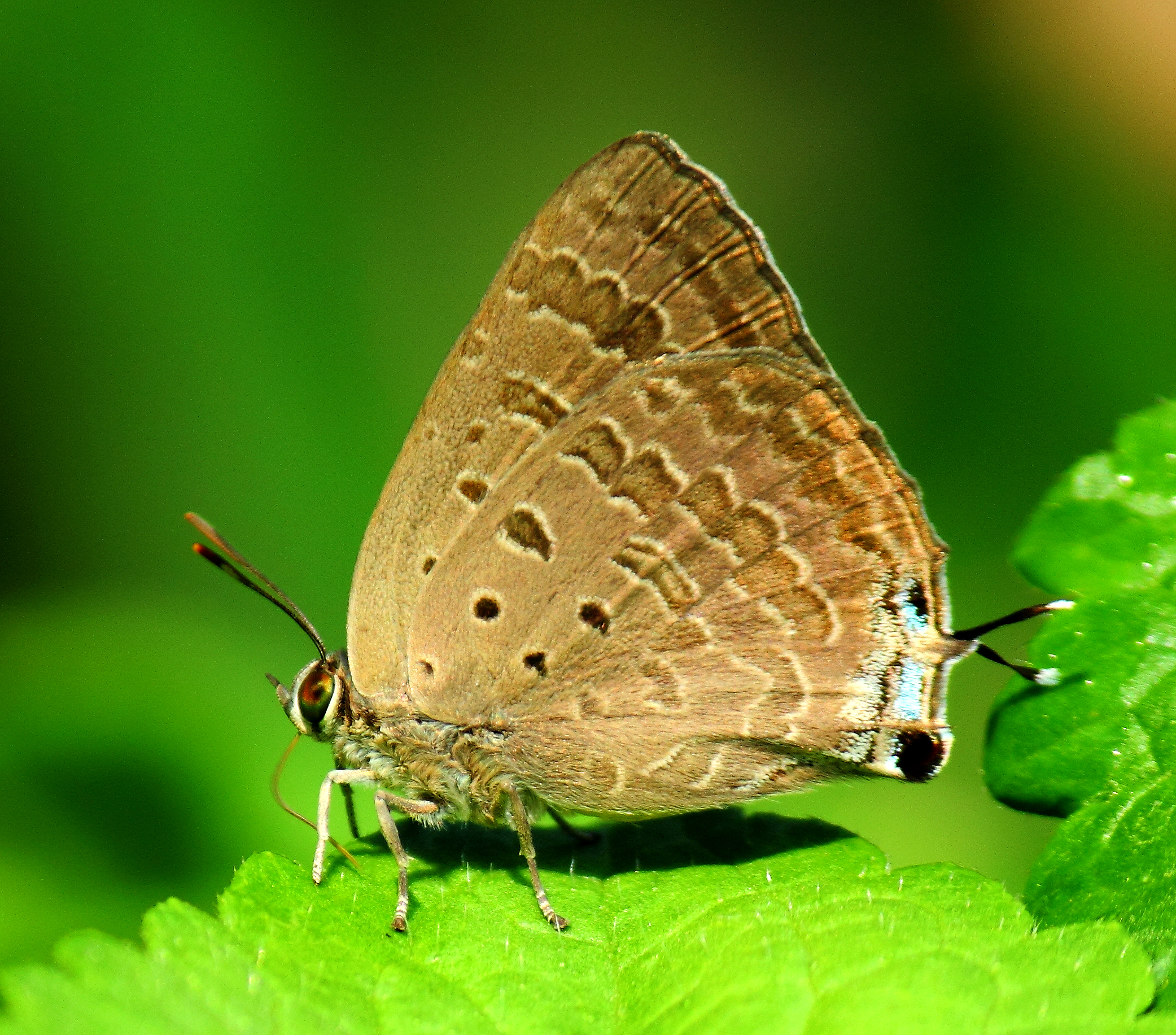
Ventral view

===== Arhopala bazaloides (Tamil oakblue) =====
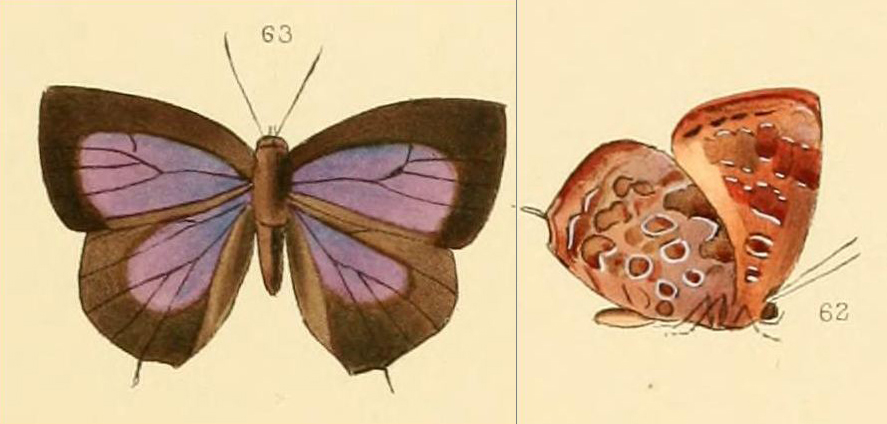
Museum specimen

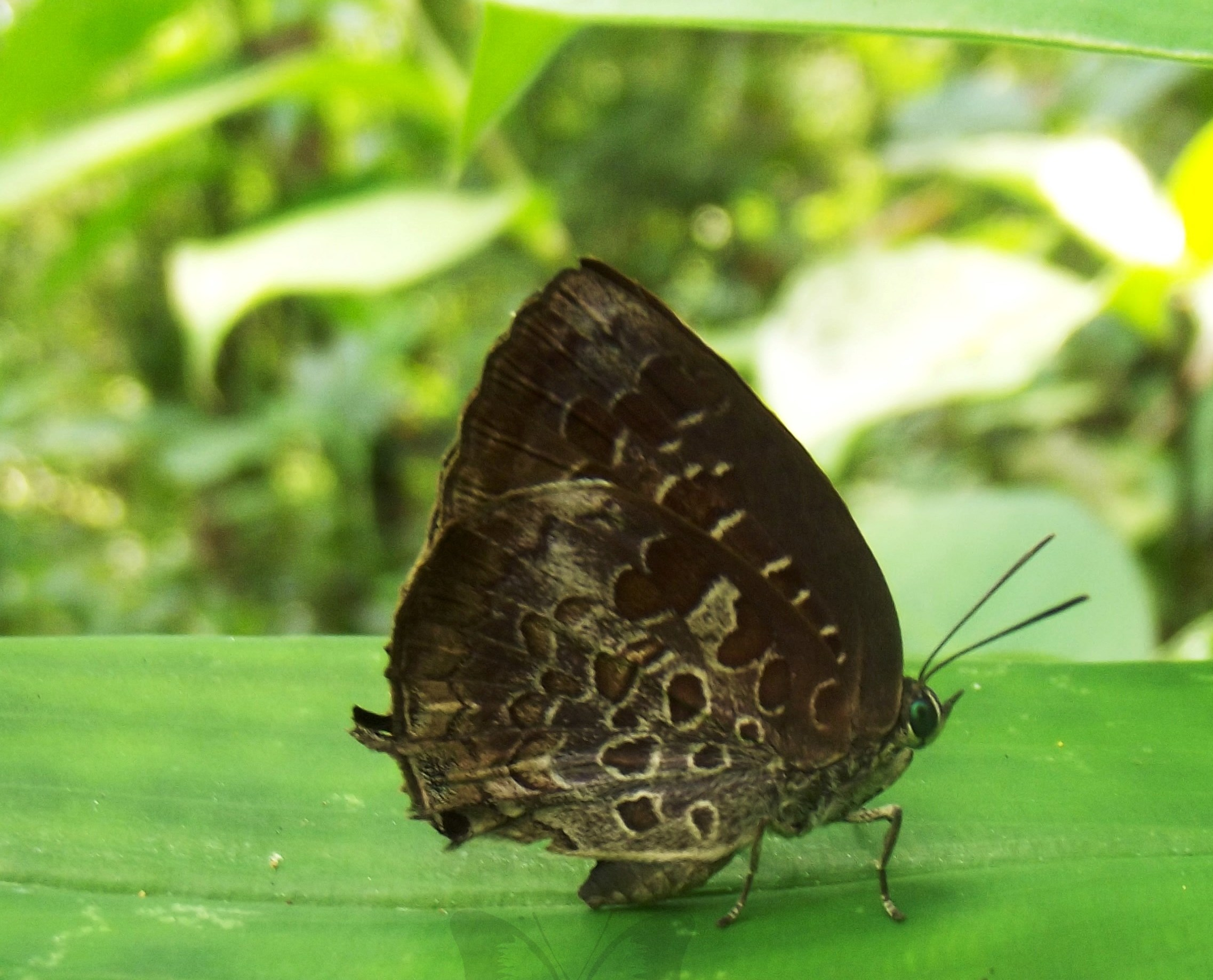
Ventral view

===== Arhopala centaurus (centaur oakblue) =====
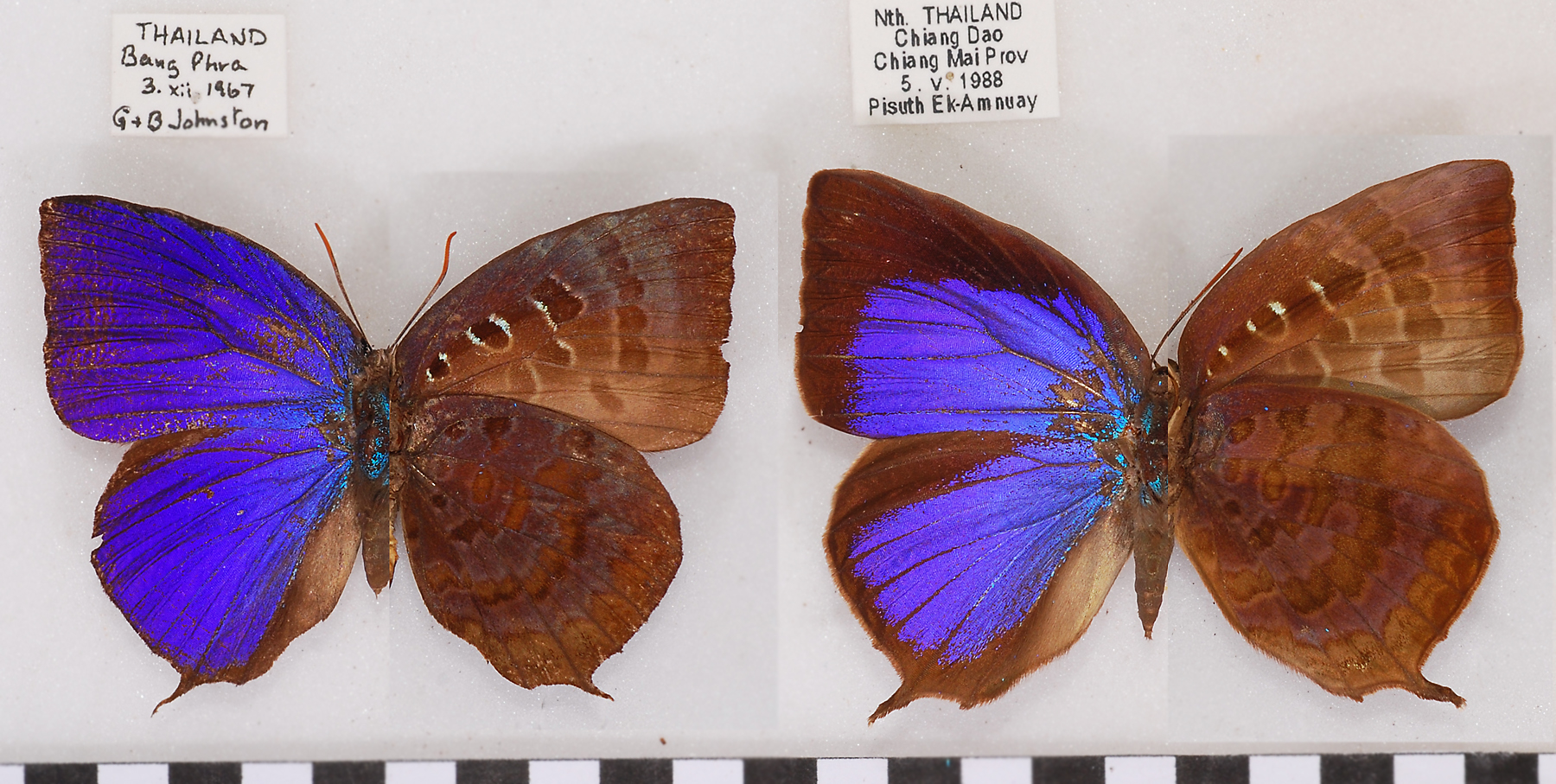
Museum specimen

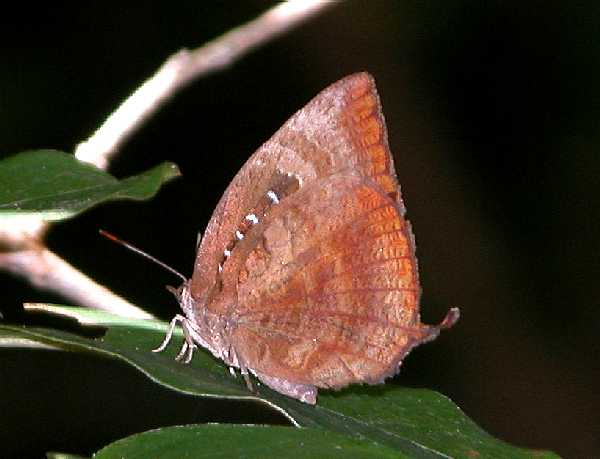
Ventral view

==== Genus: Bindahara ====
===== Bindahara phocides (plane) =====
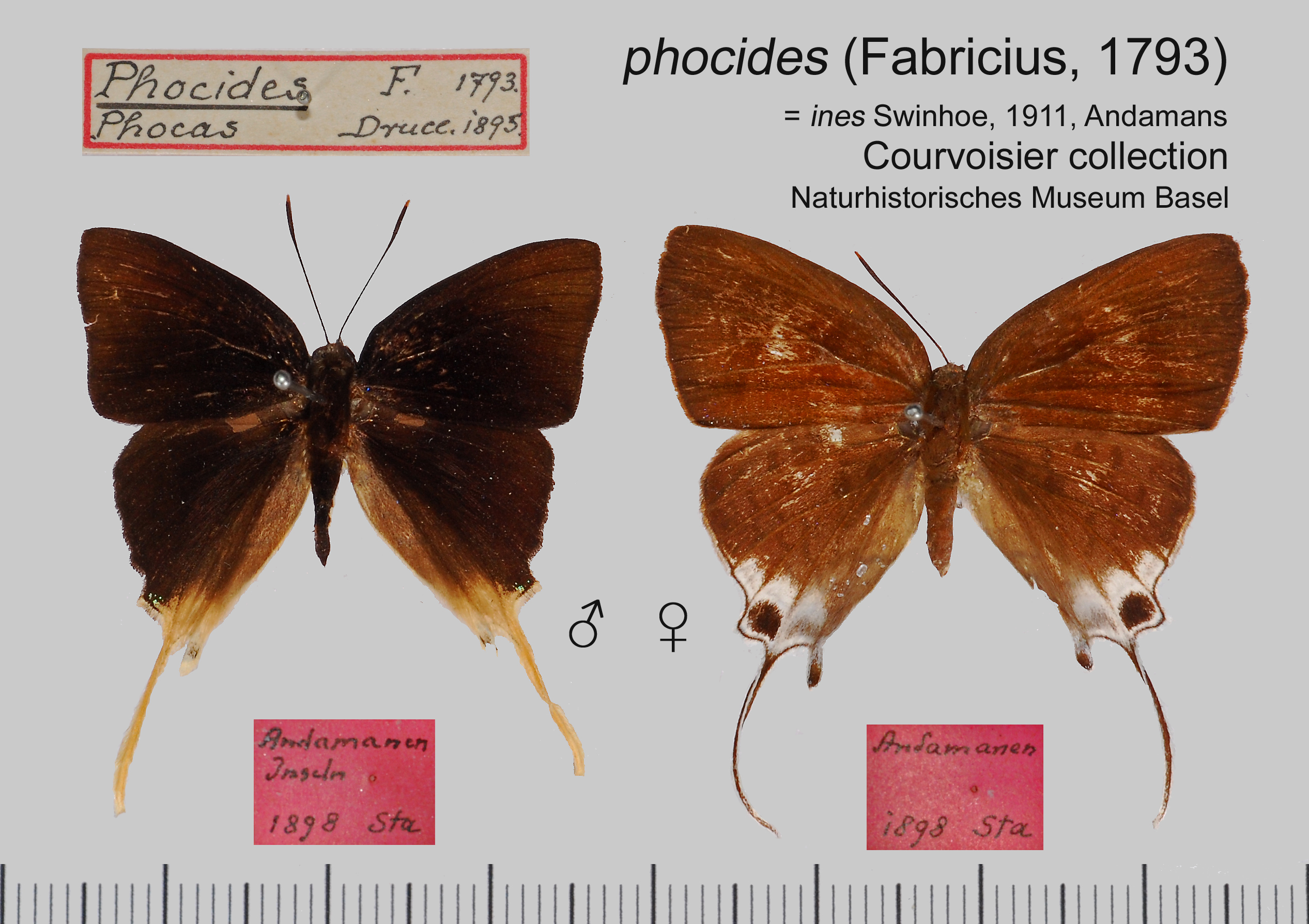
Museum specimen

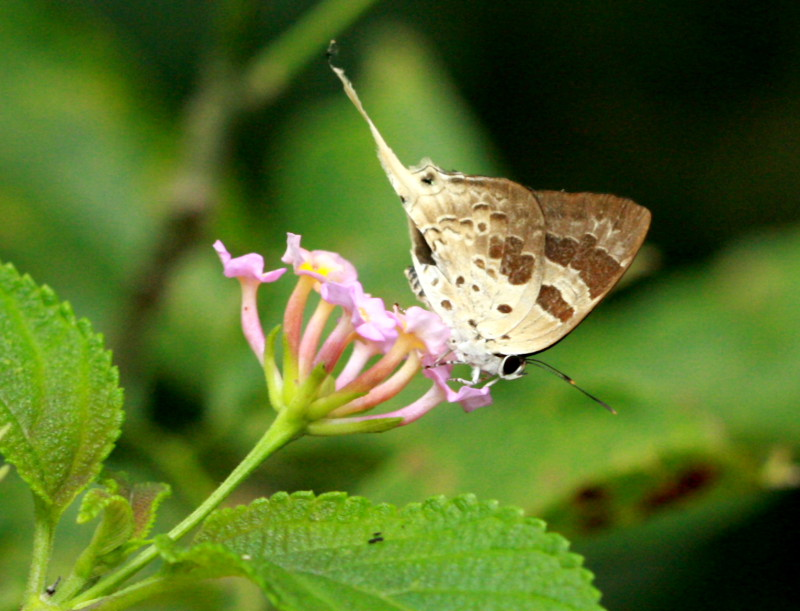
Ventral view

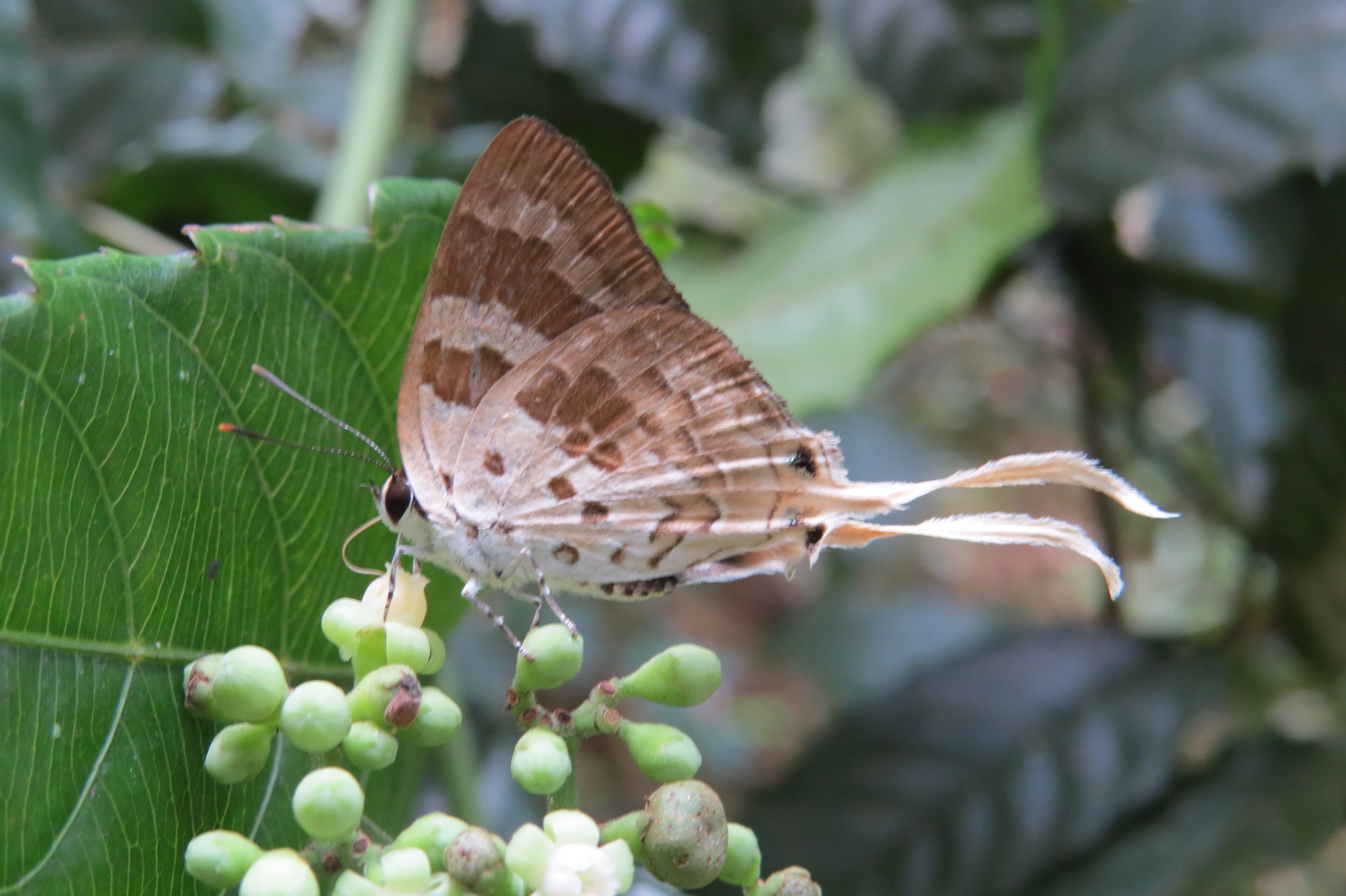
Ventral view

==== Genus: Catapaecilma ====
===== Catapaecilma major (common tinsel) =====
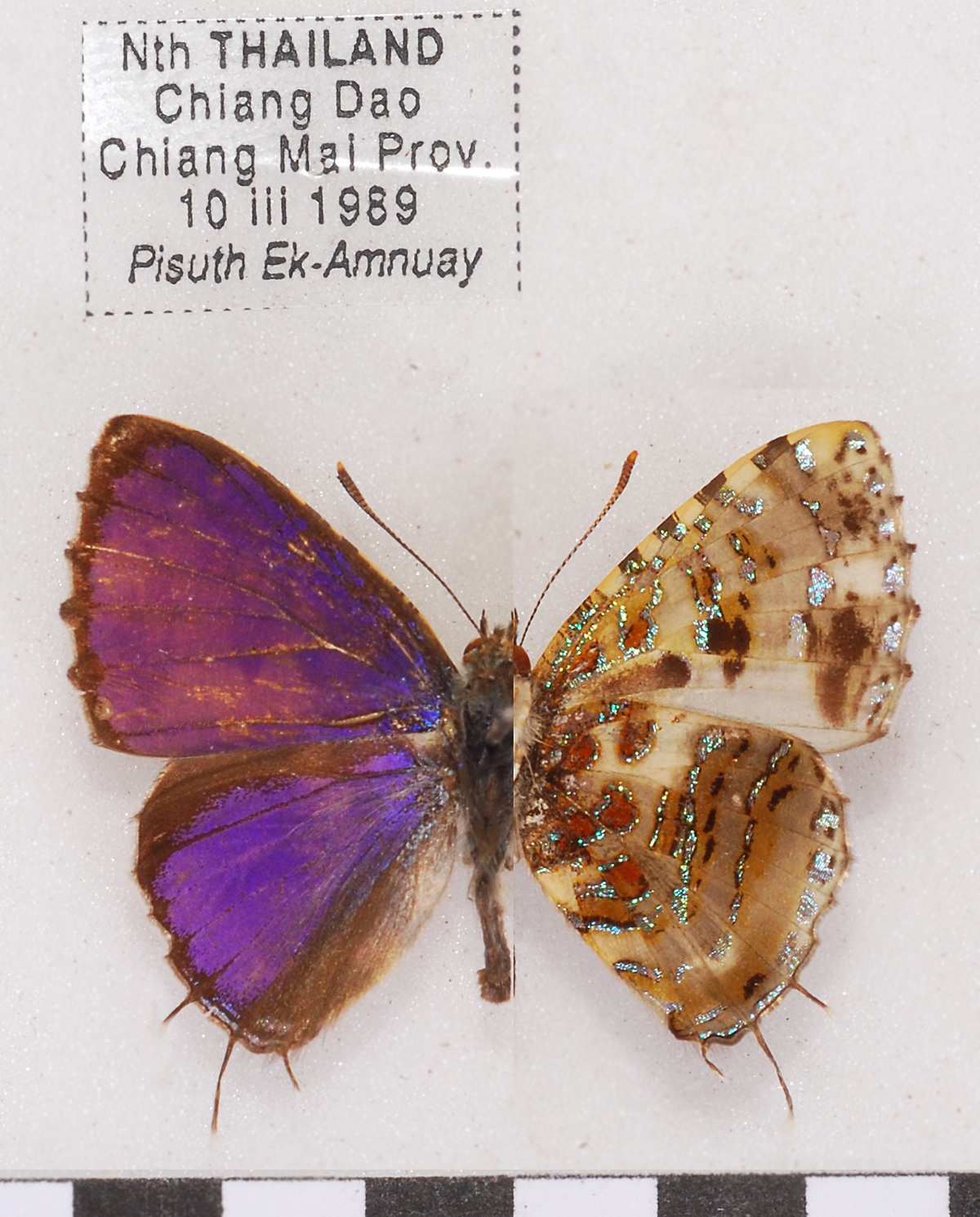
Museum specimen

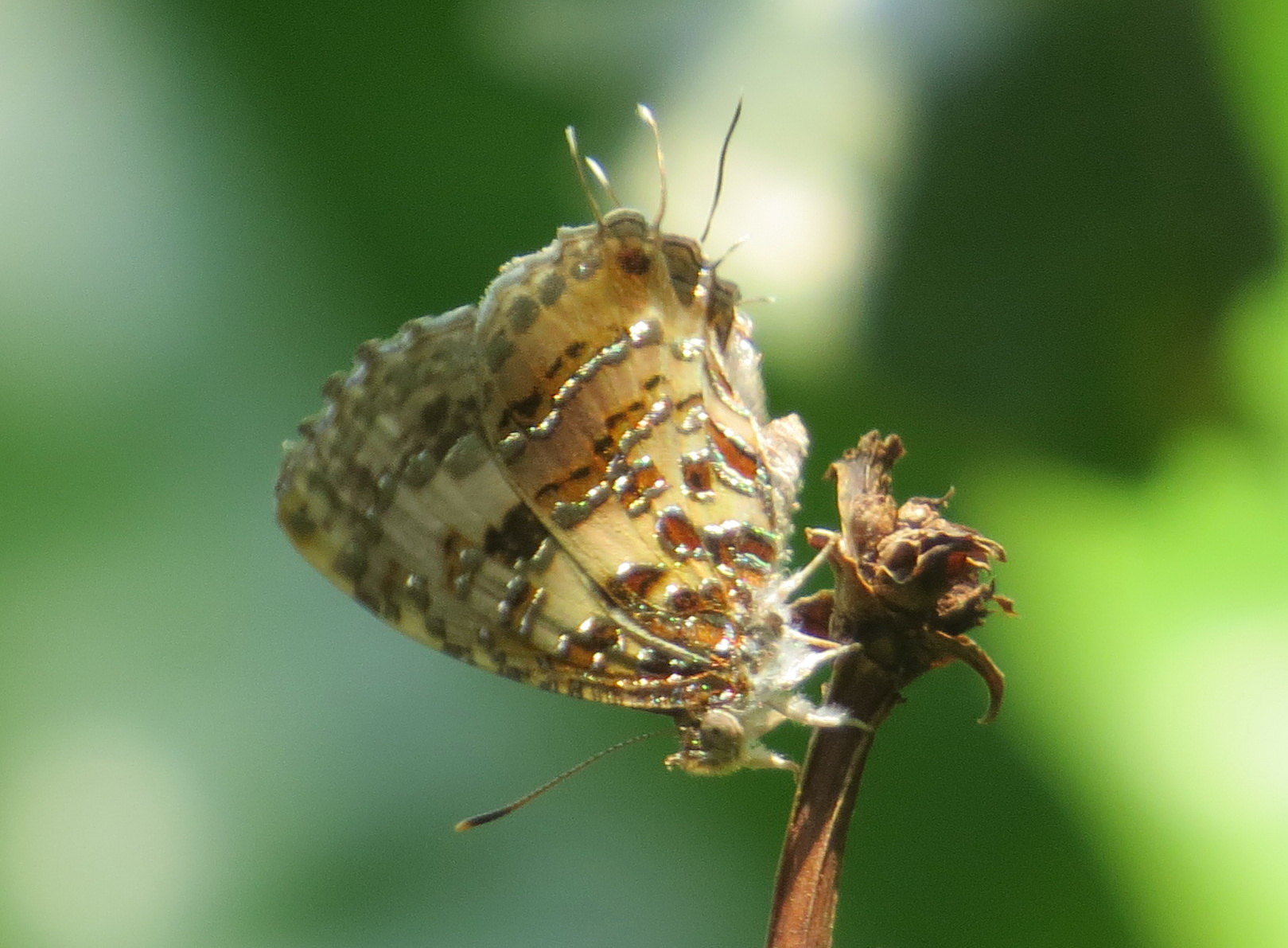
Ventral view

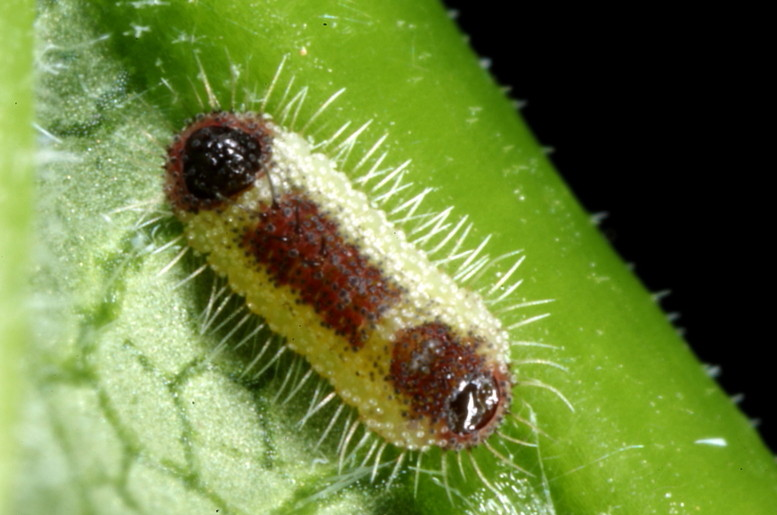
Larva

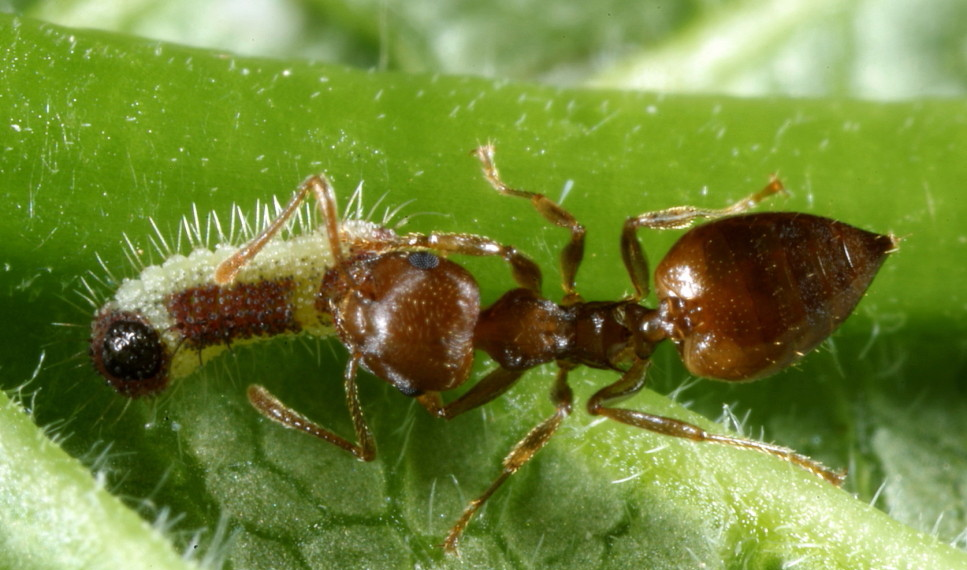
Larva attended by ant

==== Genus: Cheritra ====
===== Cheritra freja (common imperial) =====
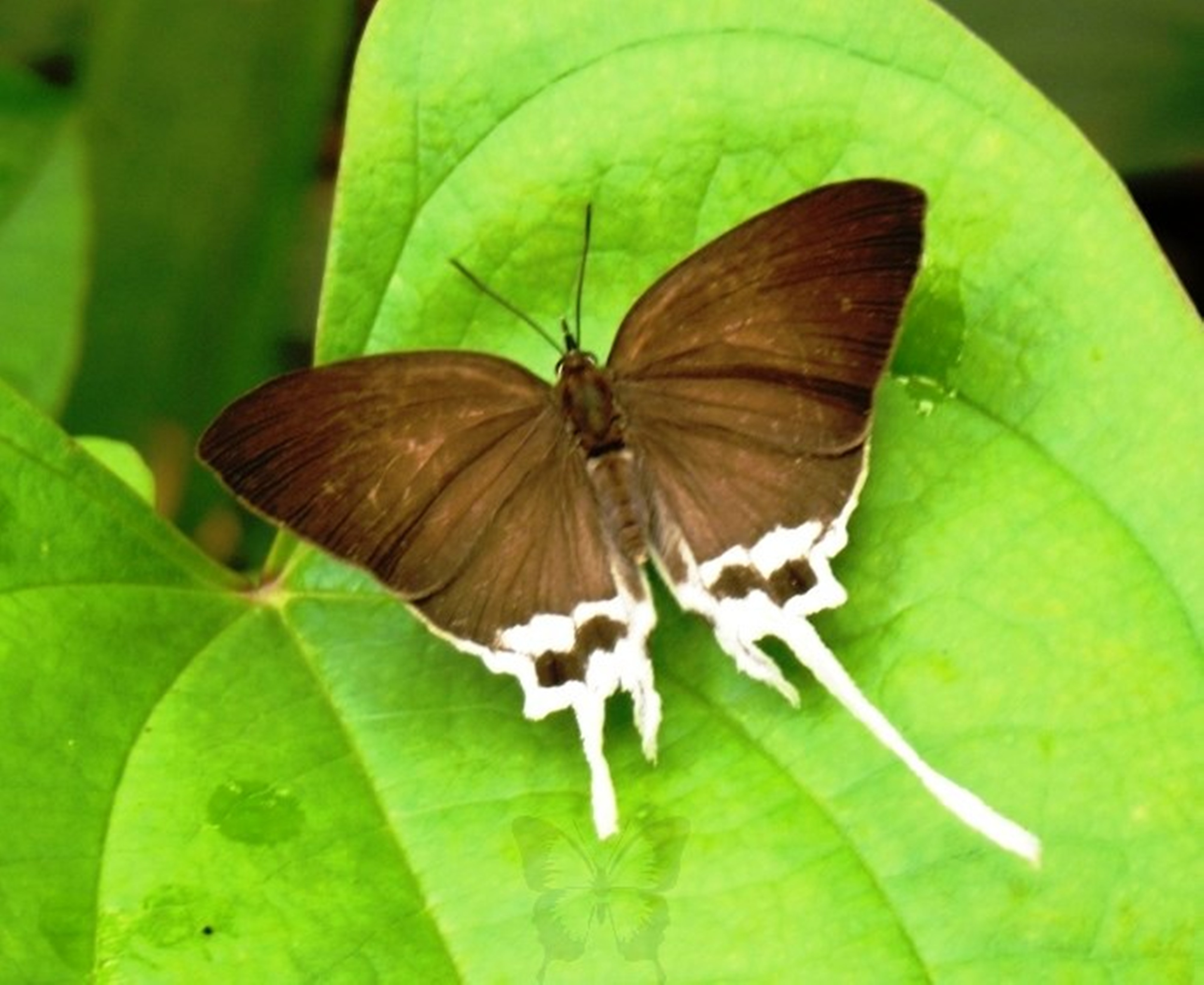
Dorsal view

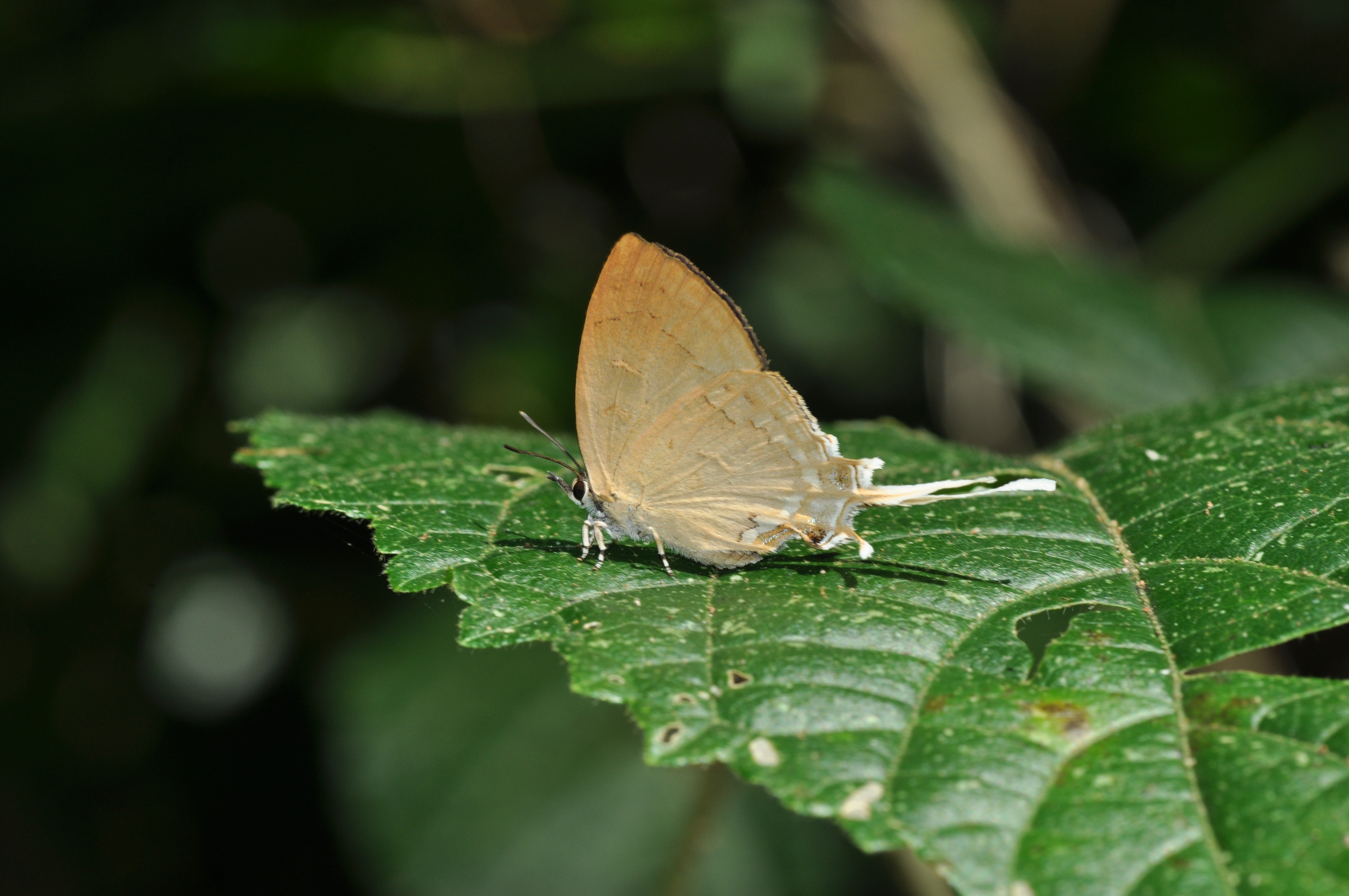
Ventral view

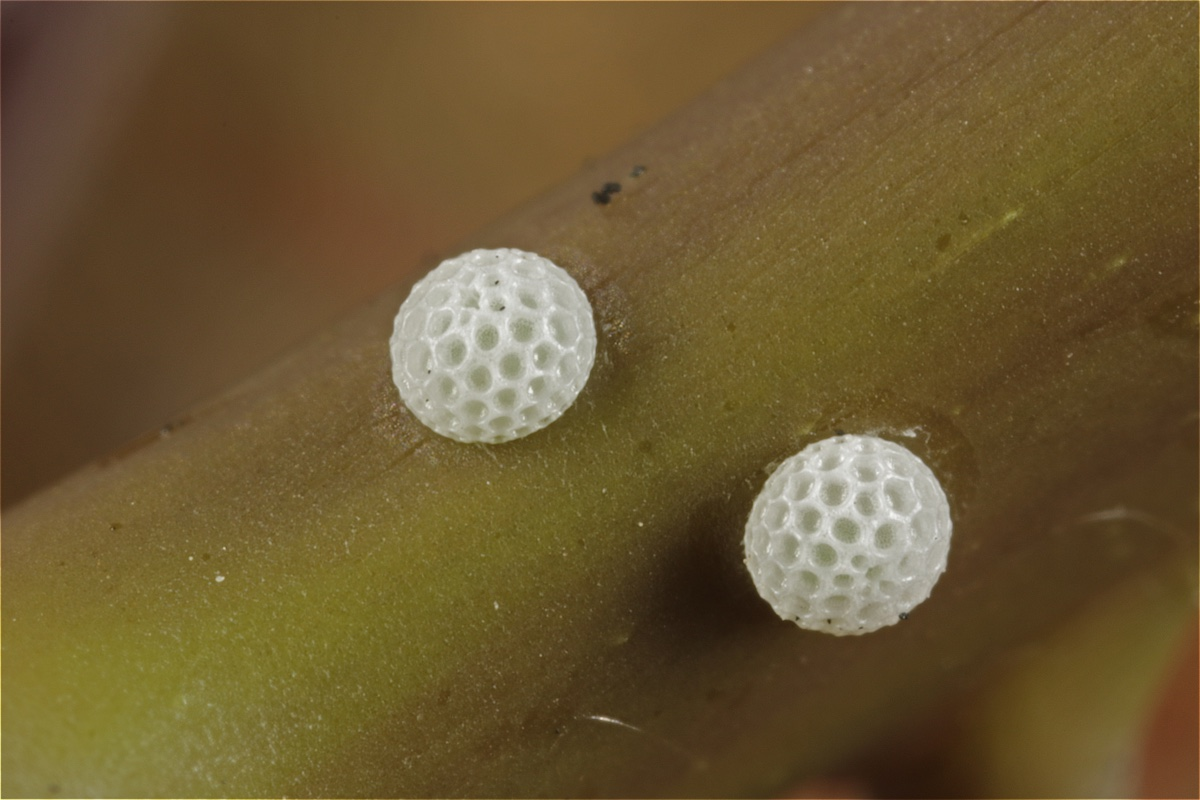
Eggs

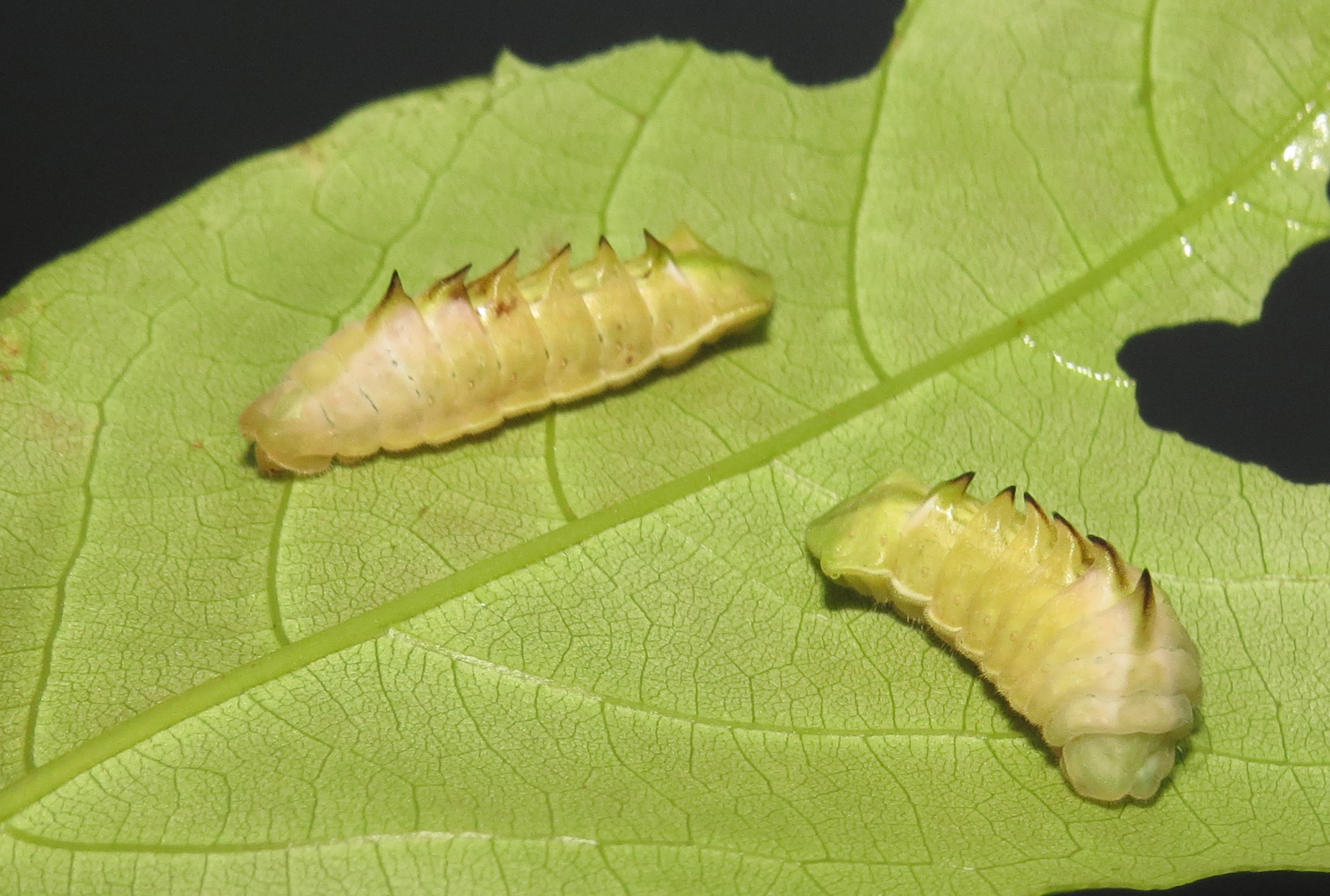
Larva

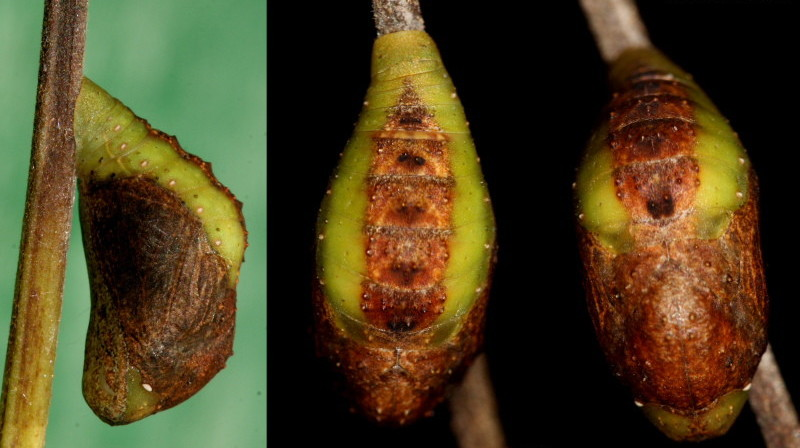
Pupa

==== Genus: Creon ====
===== Creon cleobis (broadtail royal) =====
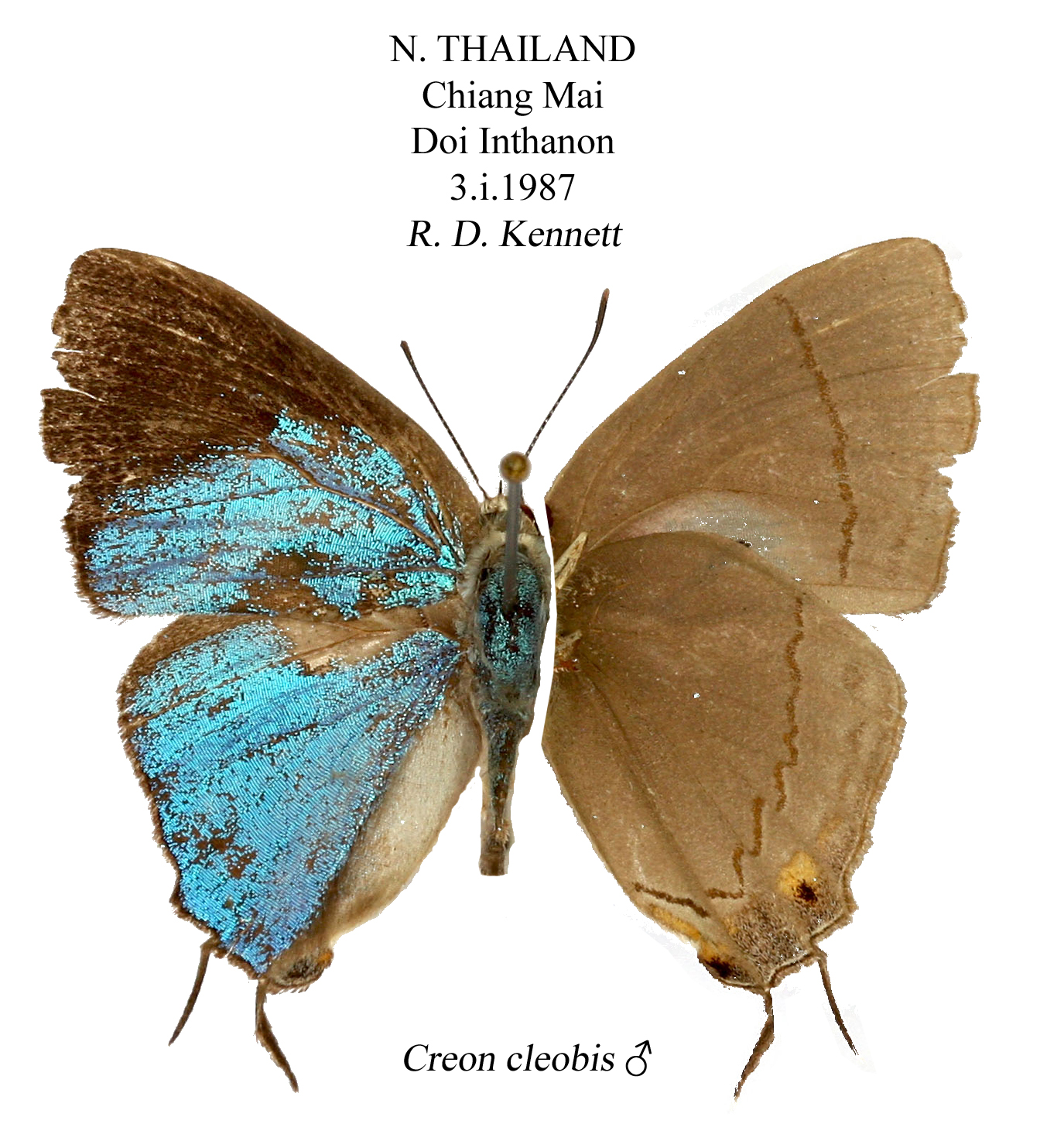
Museum specimen

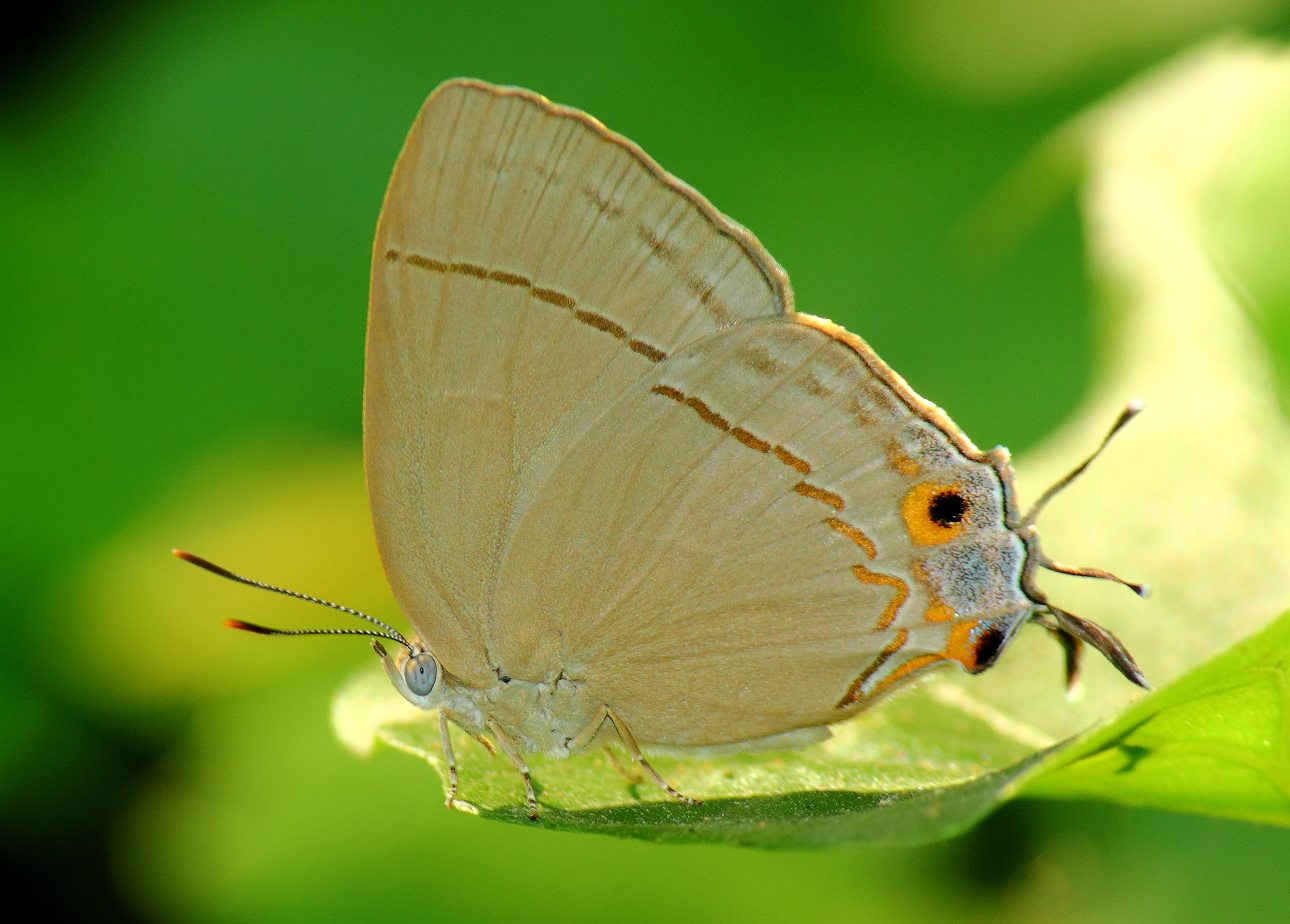
Ventral view

==== Genus: Deudorix ====
===== Deudorix epijarbas (cornelian) =====
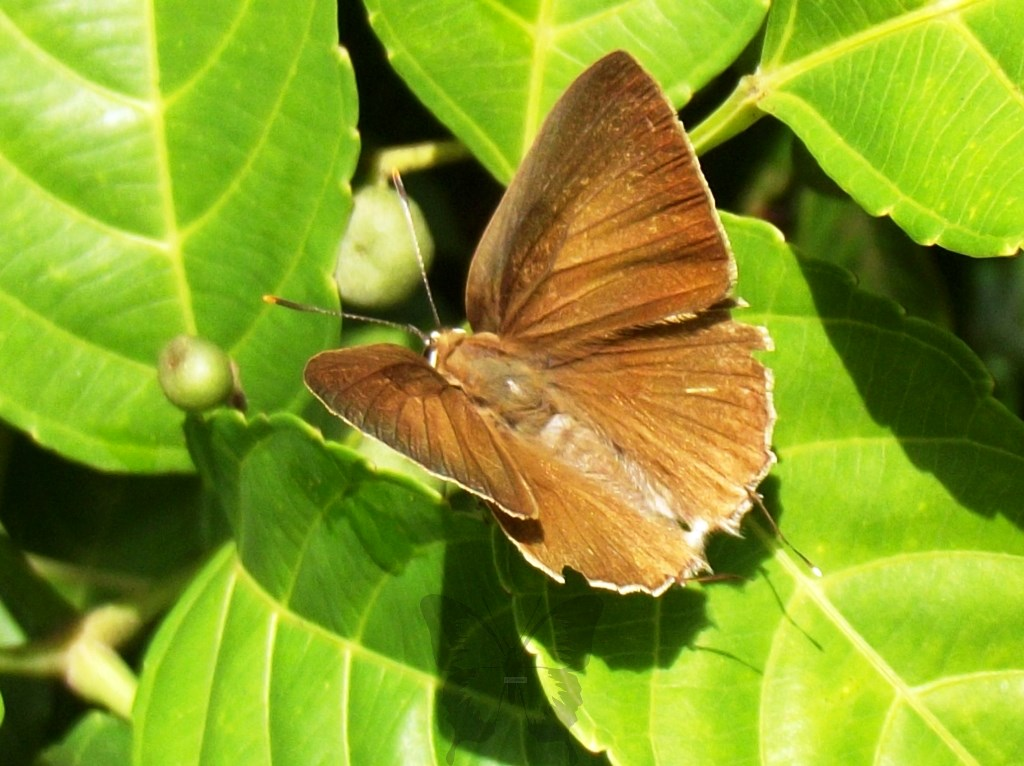
Dorsal view

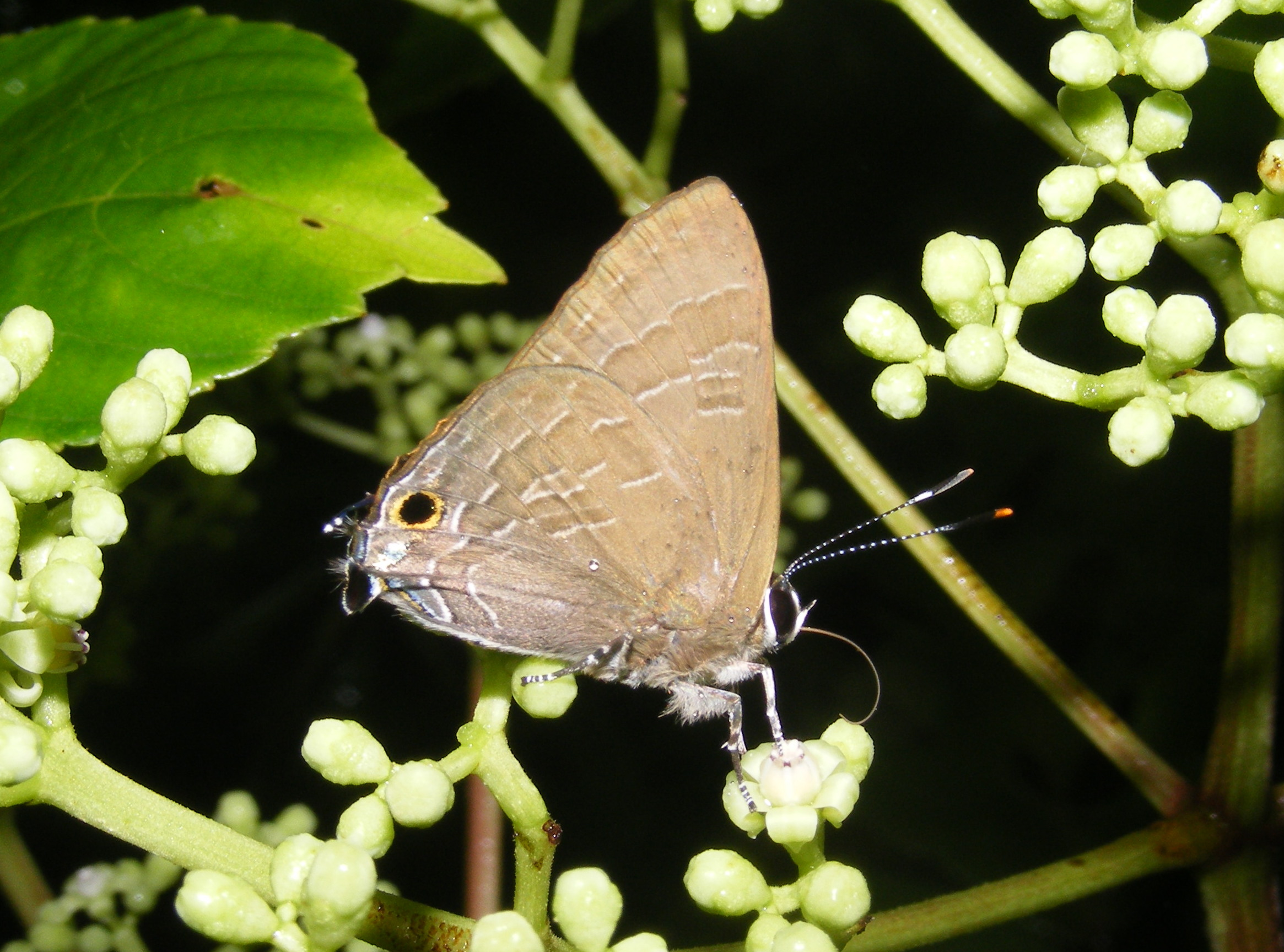
Ventral view

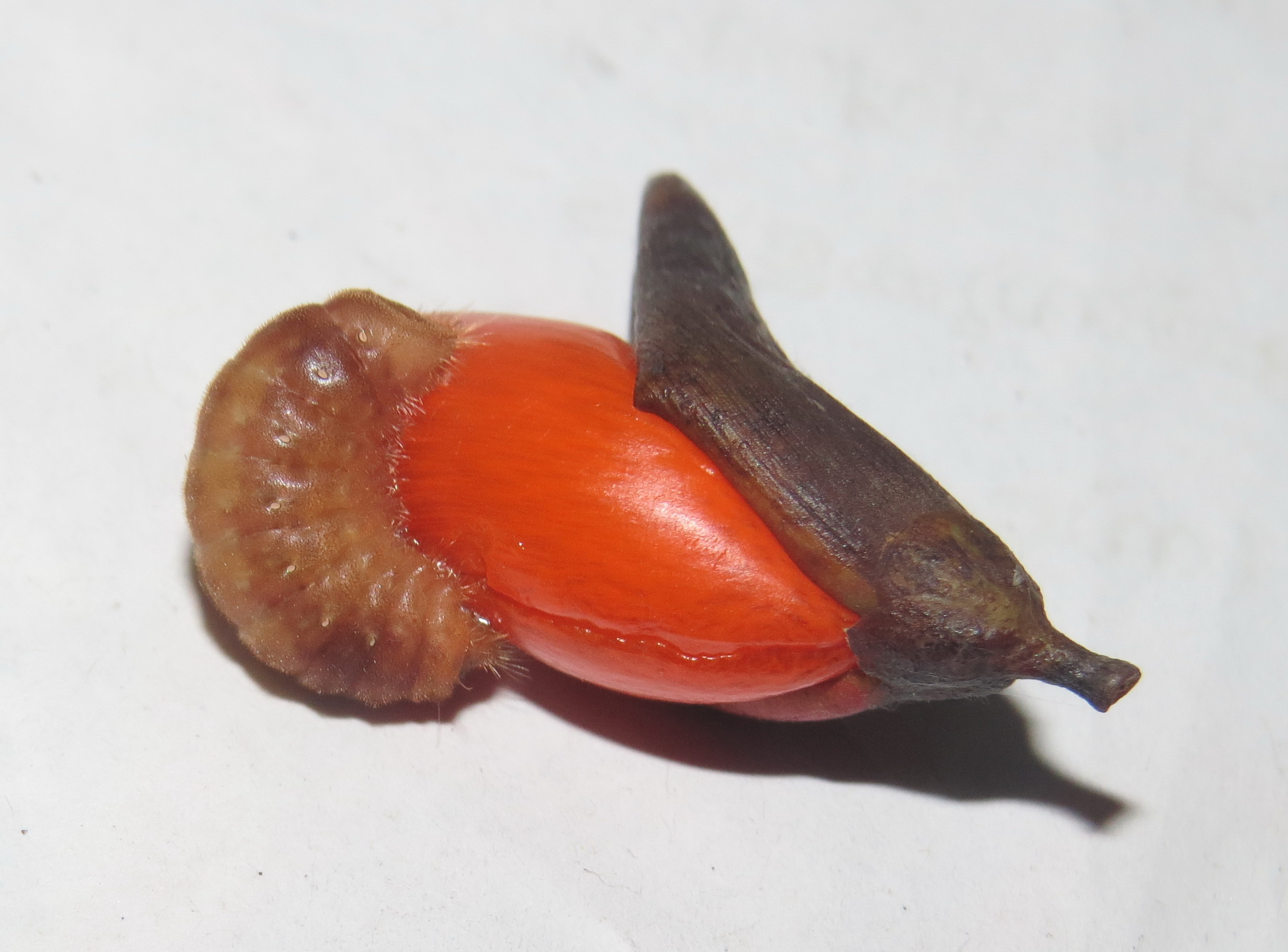
Larva

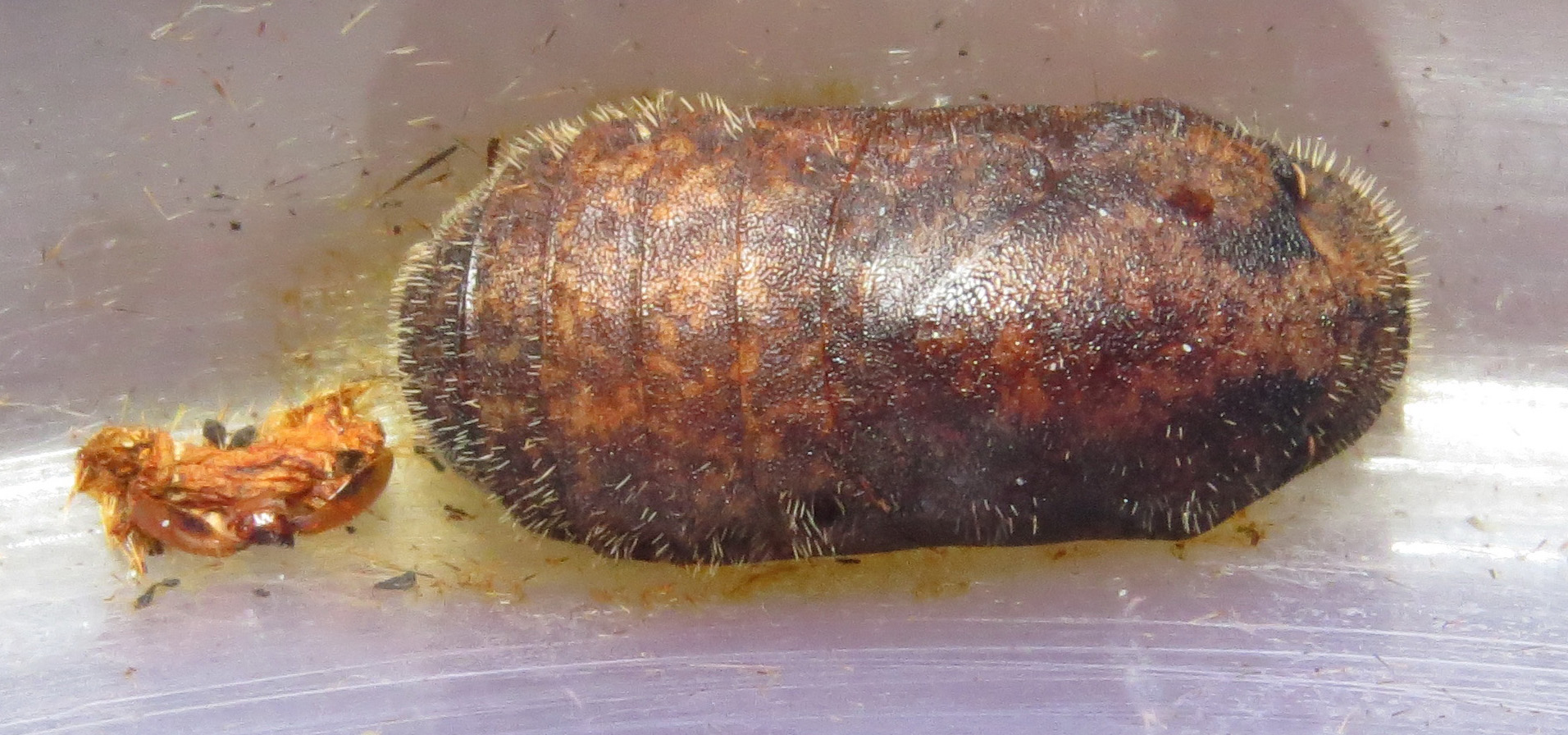
Pupa

==== Genus: Horaga ====
===== Horaga onyx (common onyx) =====
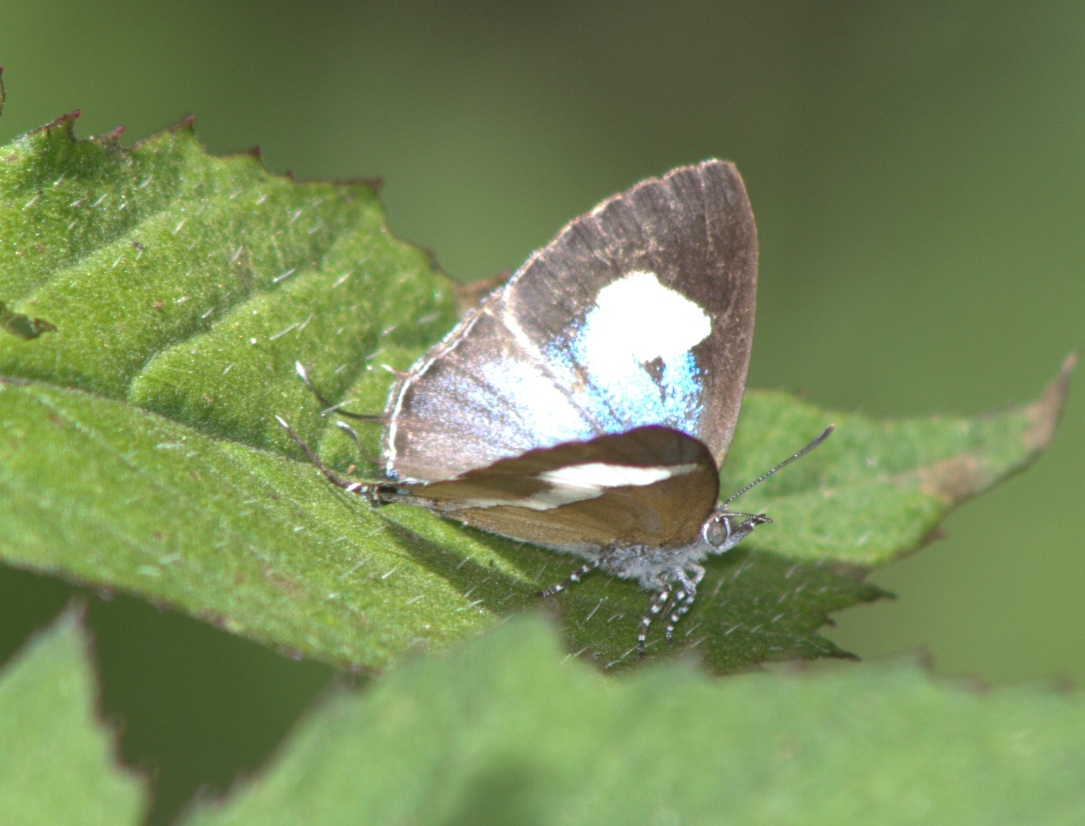
Dorsal view (female)

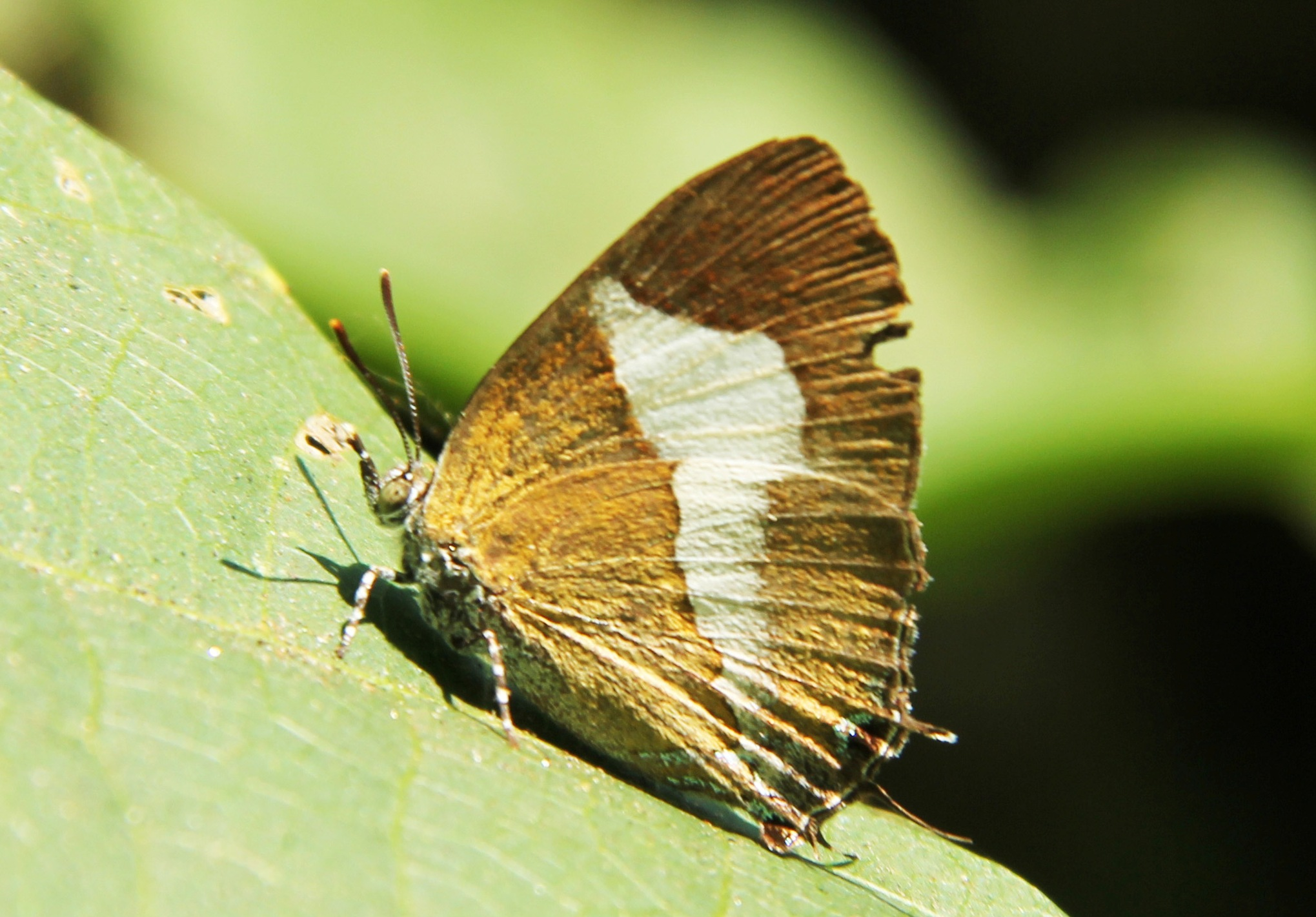
Ventral view

===== Horaga viola (brown onyx) =====
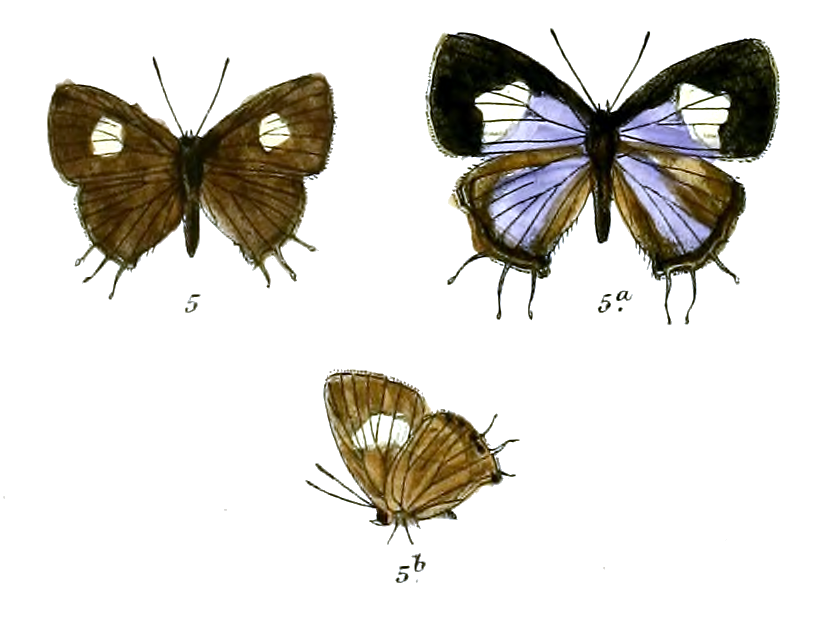
Illustration

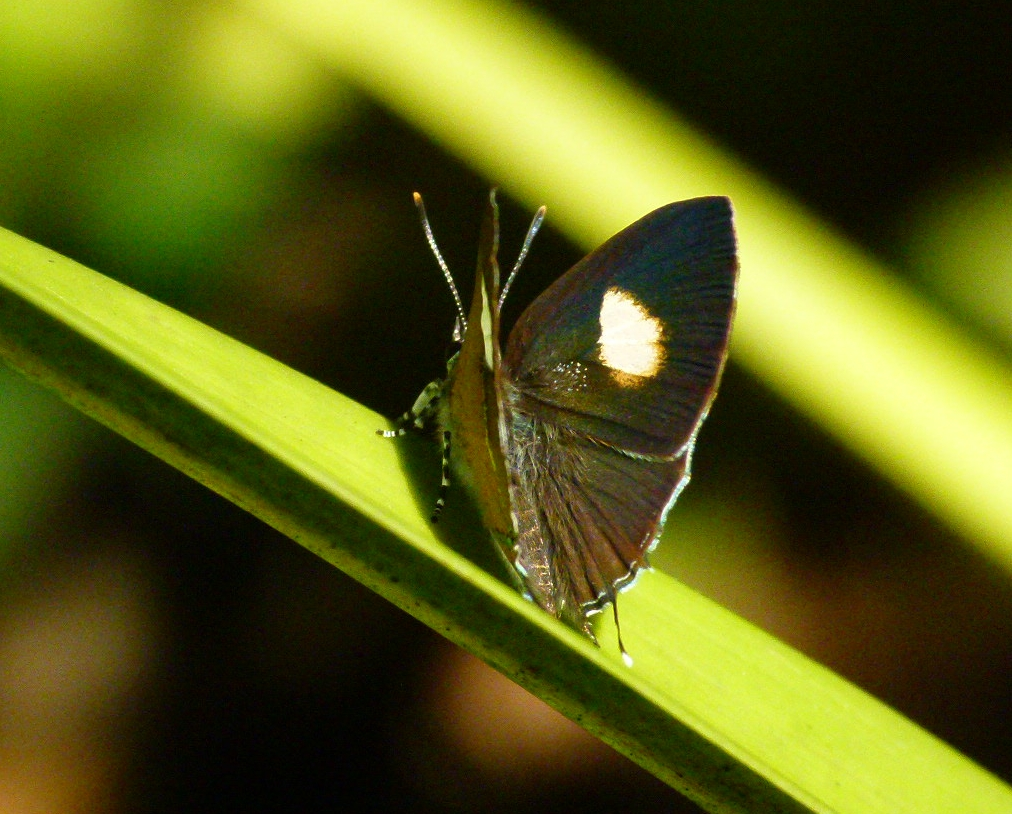
Ventral view

==== Genus: Hypolycaena ====
===== Hypolycaena nilgirica (Nilgiri tit) =====
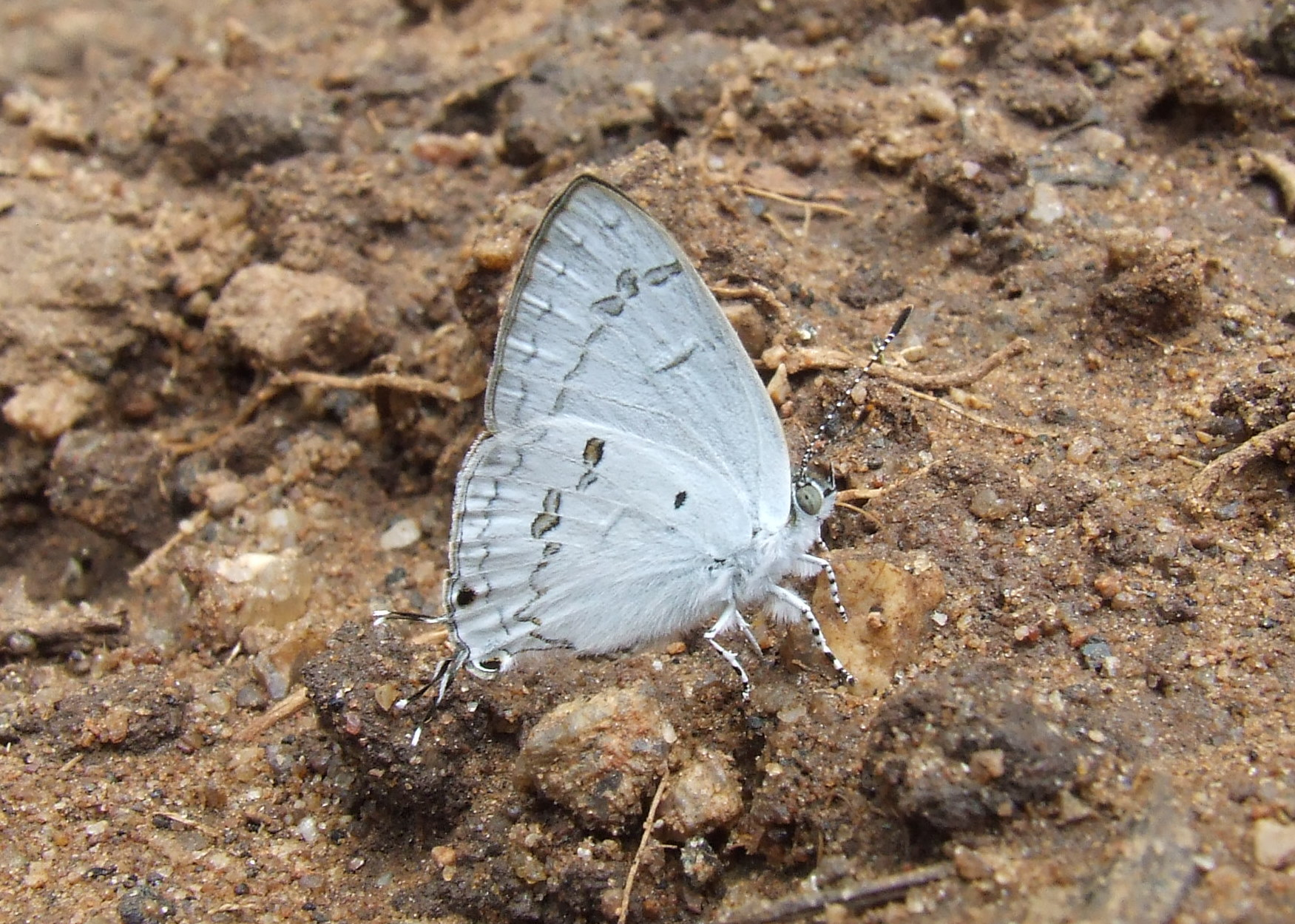
Ventral view

===== Hypolycaena othona (orchid tit) =====
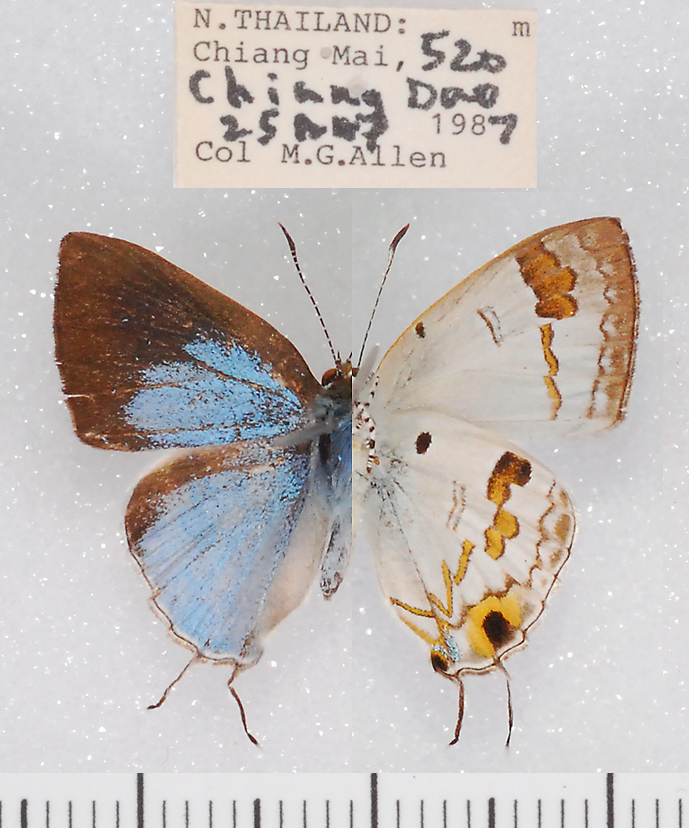
Museum specimen

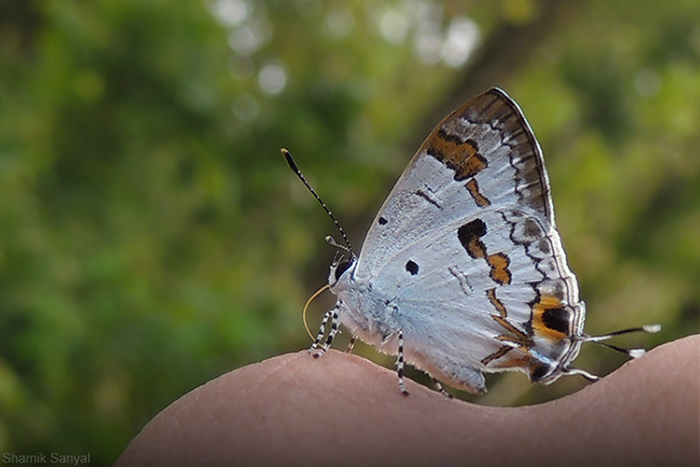
Ventral view

==== Genus: Iraota ====
===== Iraota timoleon (silverstreak blue) =====
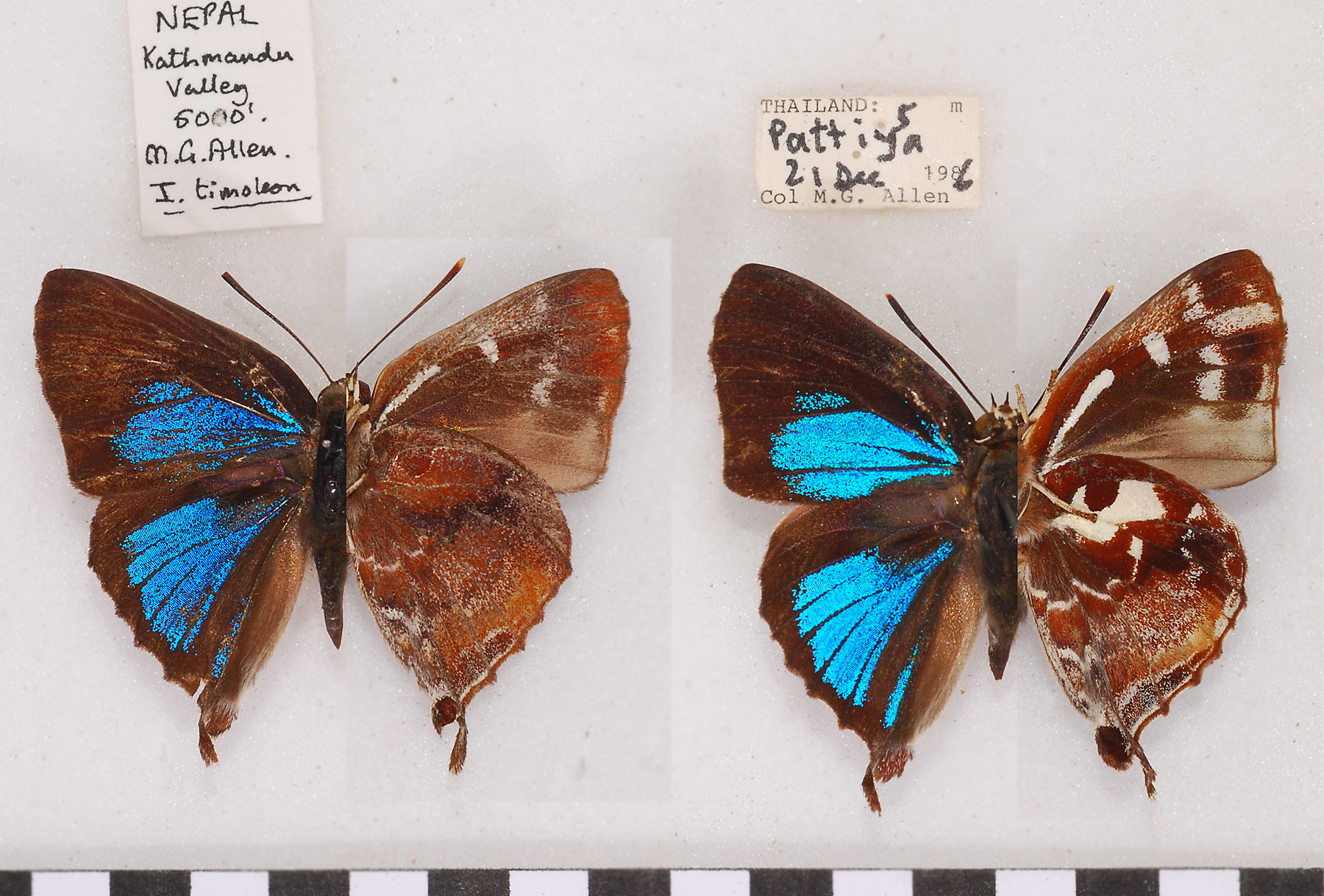
Museum specimen

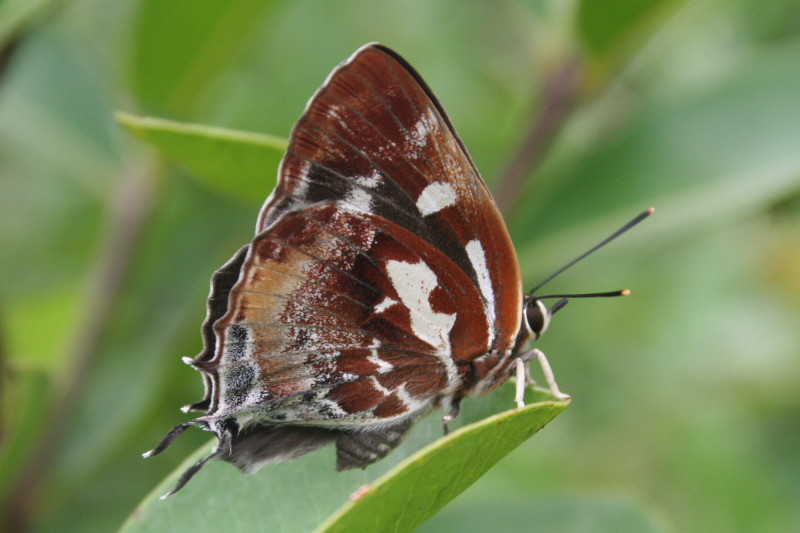
Ventral view

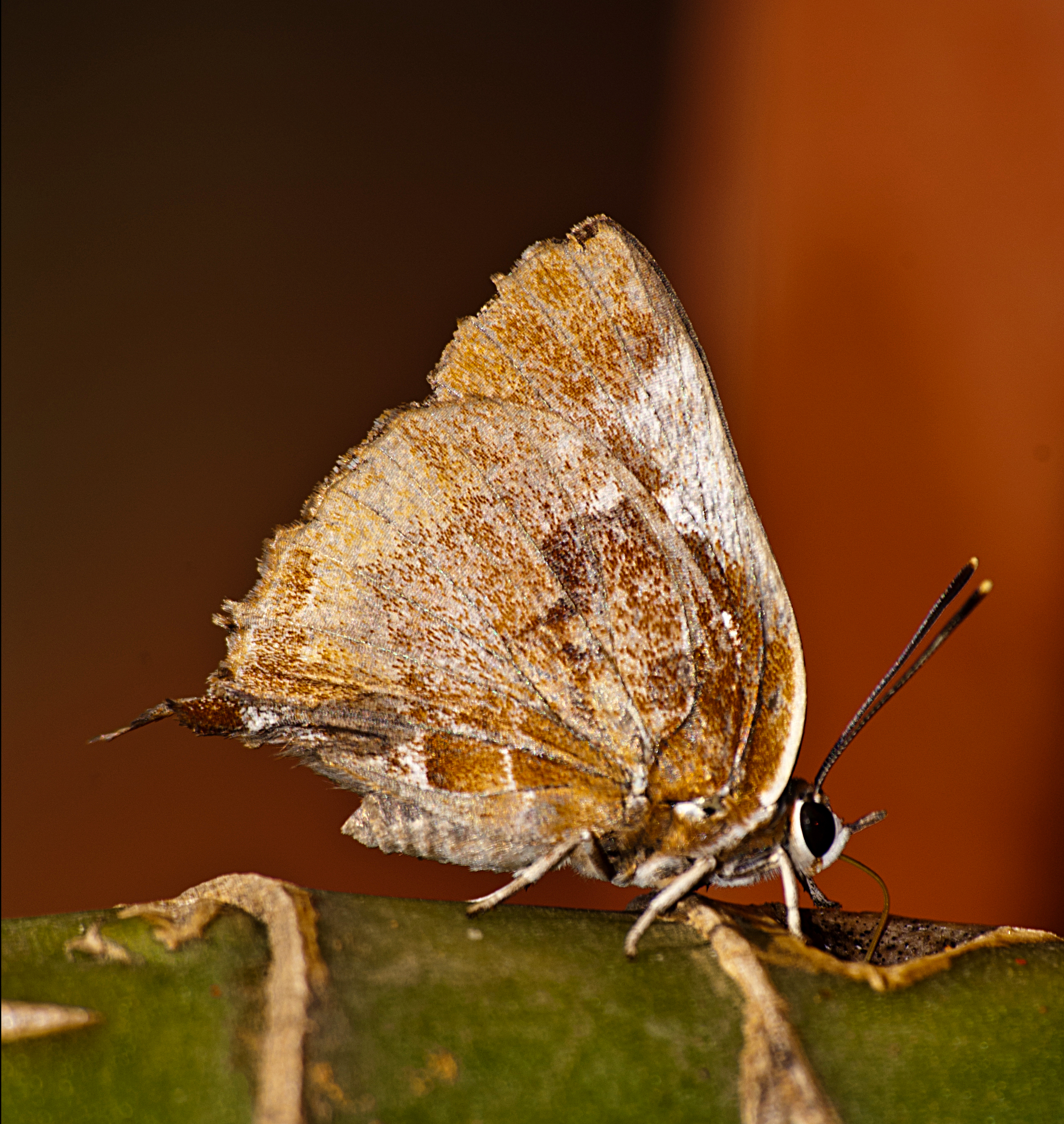
Ventral view

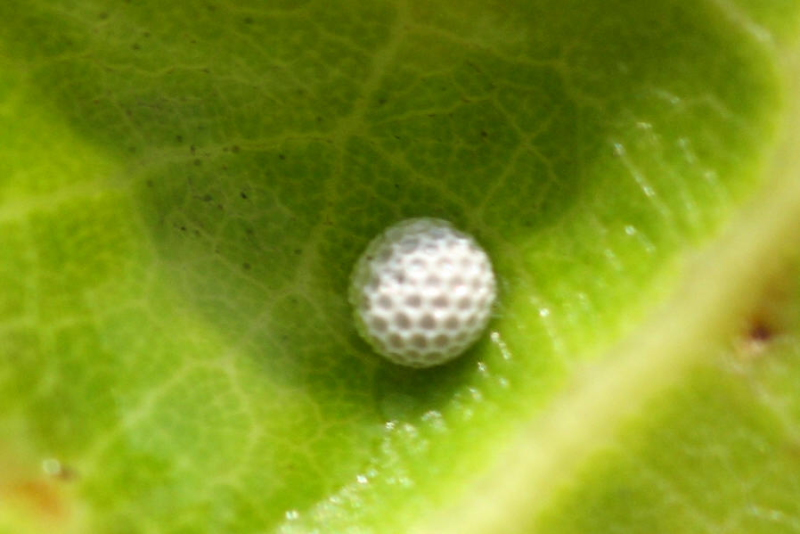
Egg

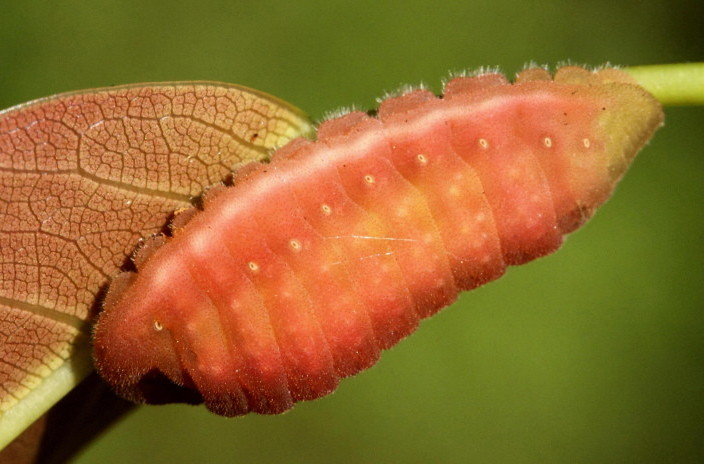
Larva

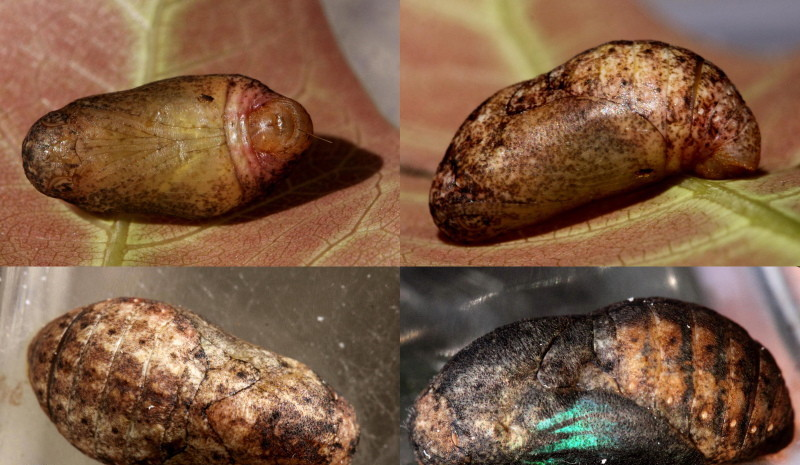
Pupa

==== Genus: Loxura ====
===== Loxura atymnus (yamfly) =====
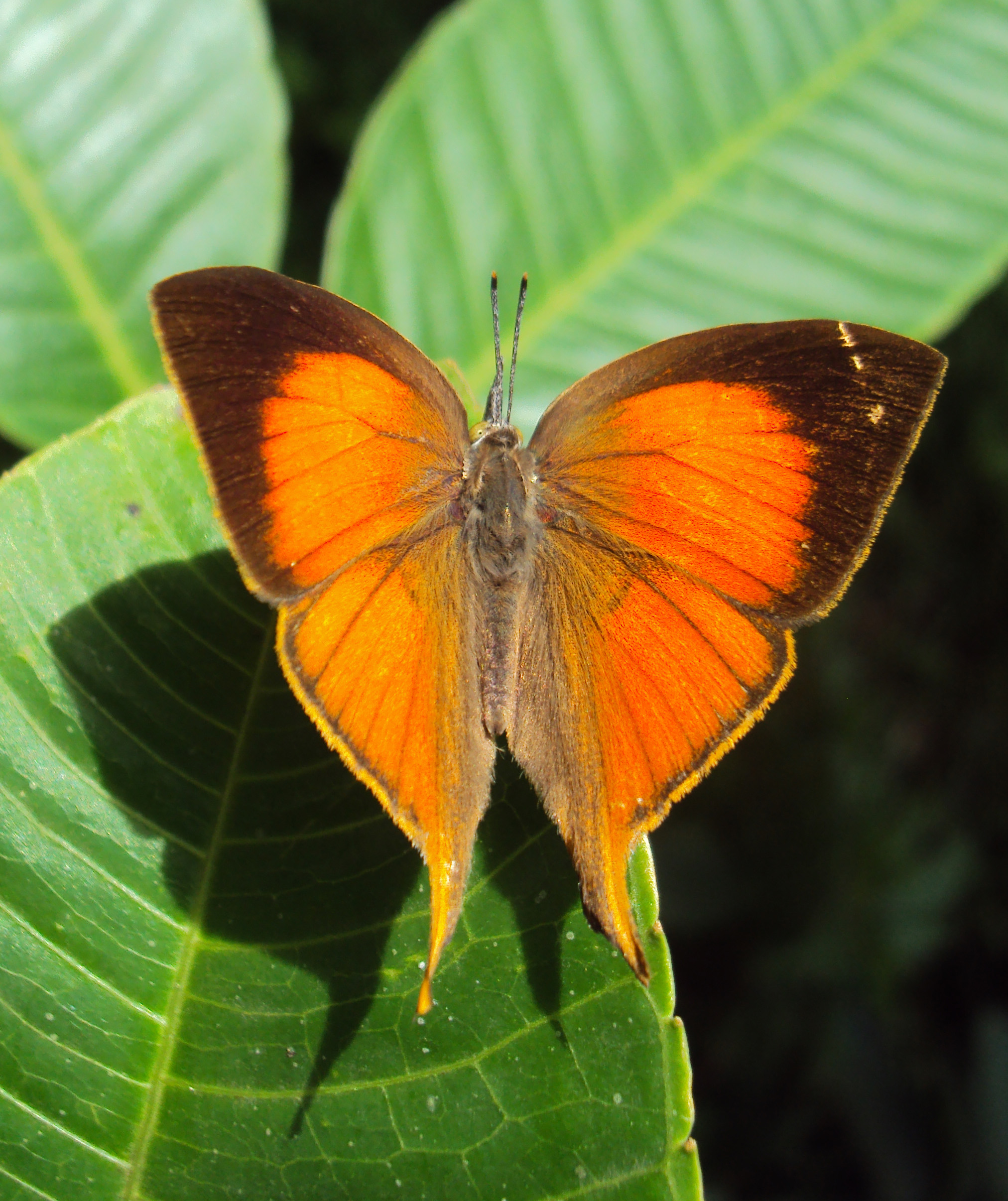
Dorsal view

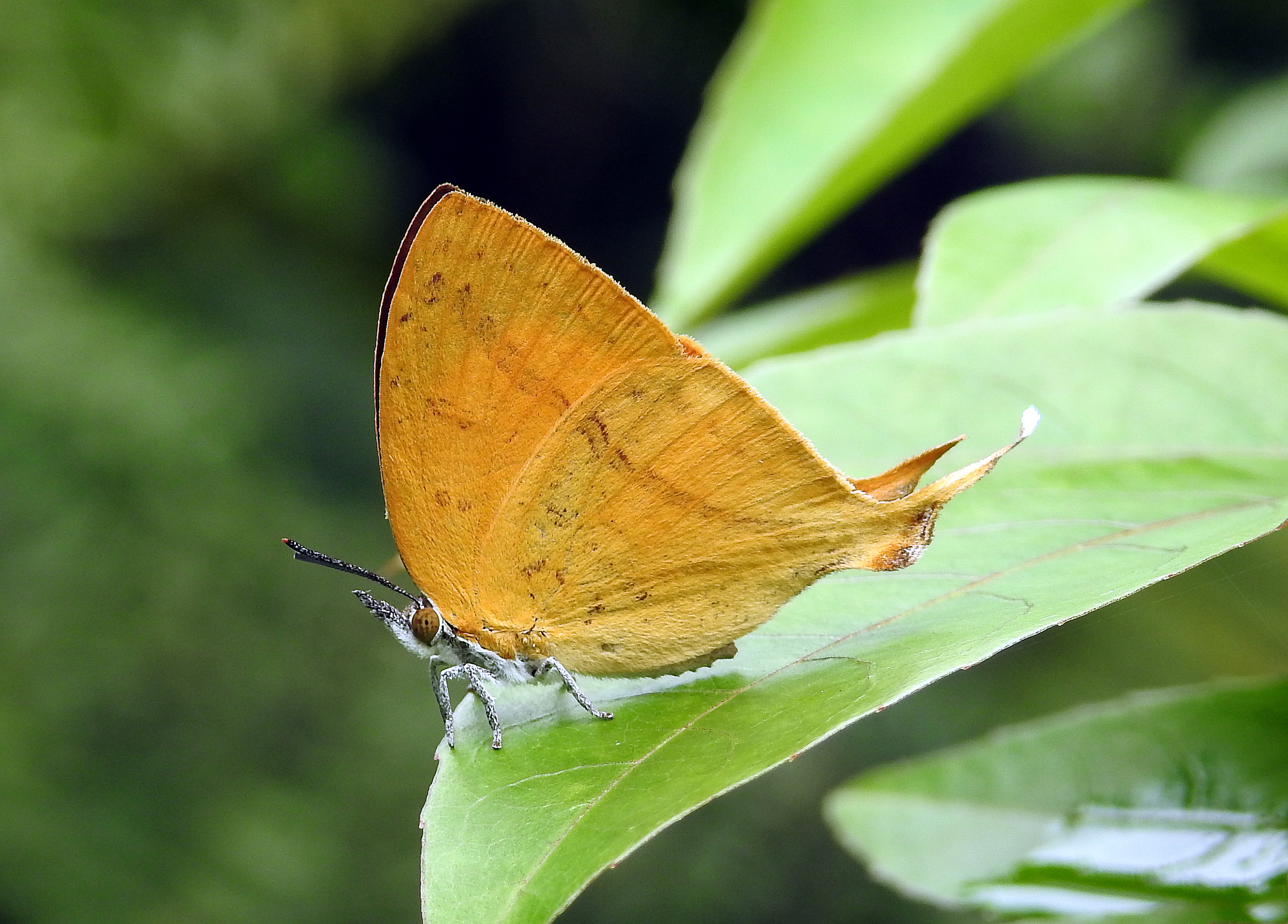
Ventral view

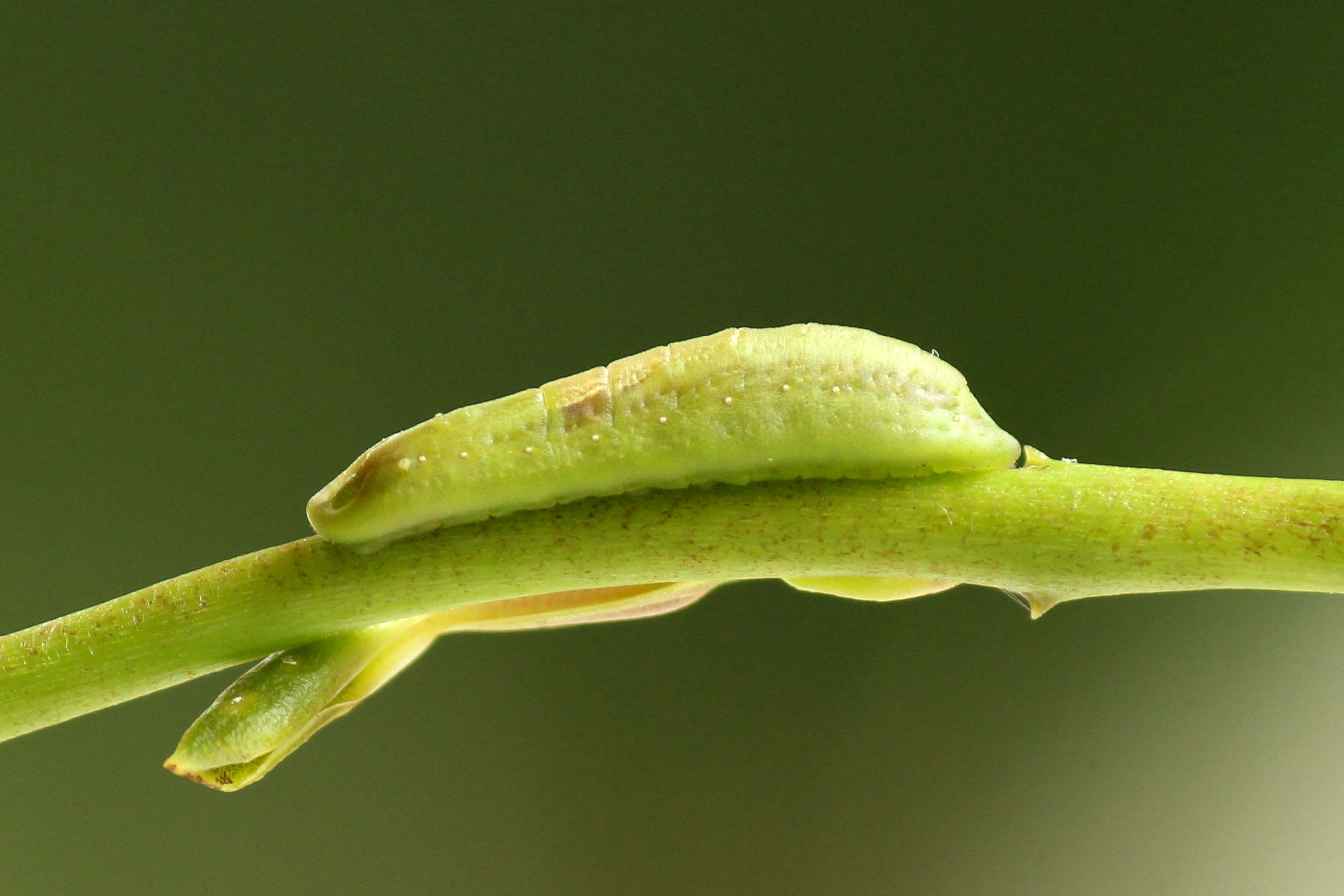
Larva

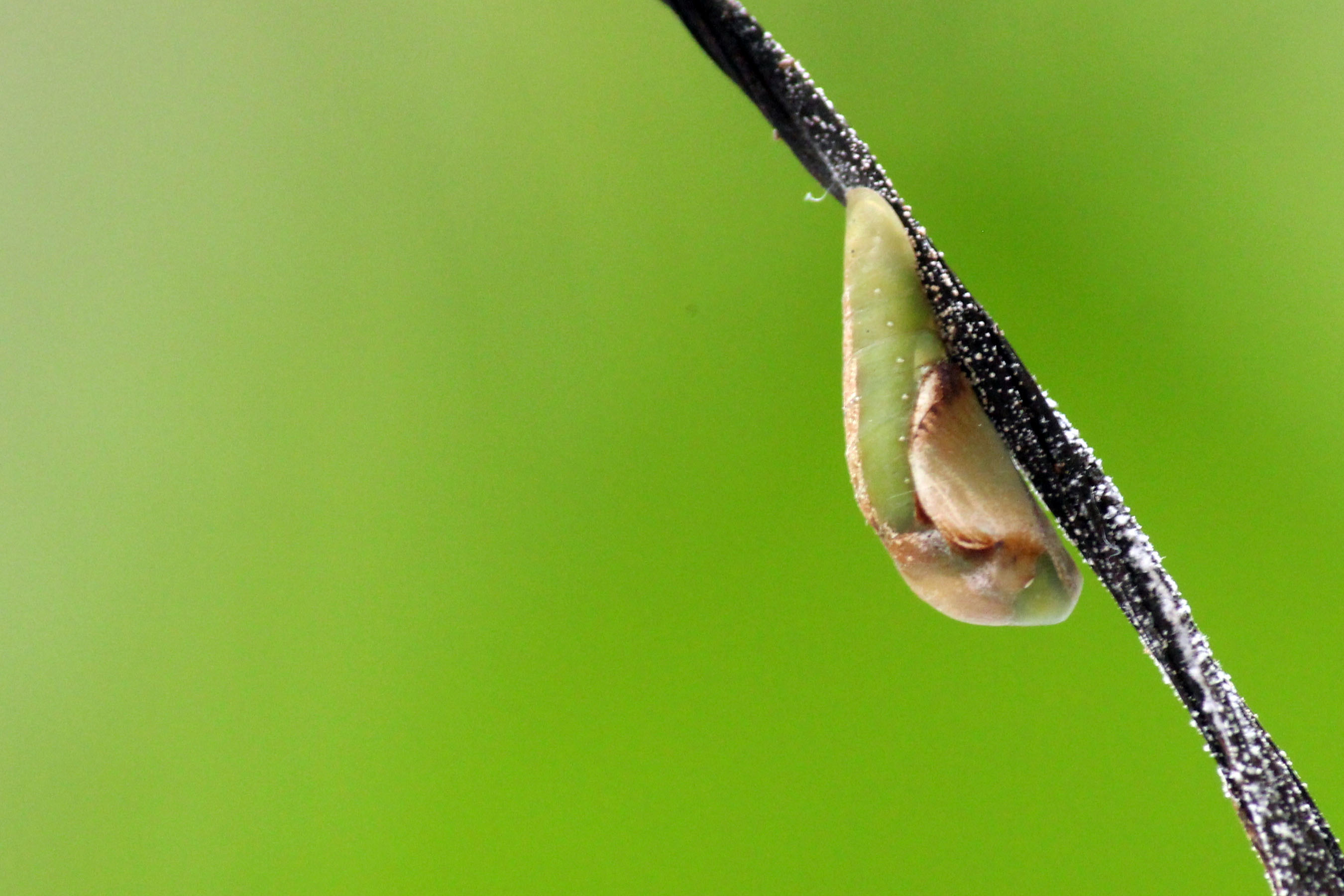
Pupa

==== Genus: Pratapa ====
===== Pratapa deva (white royal) =====
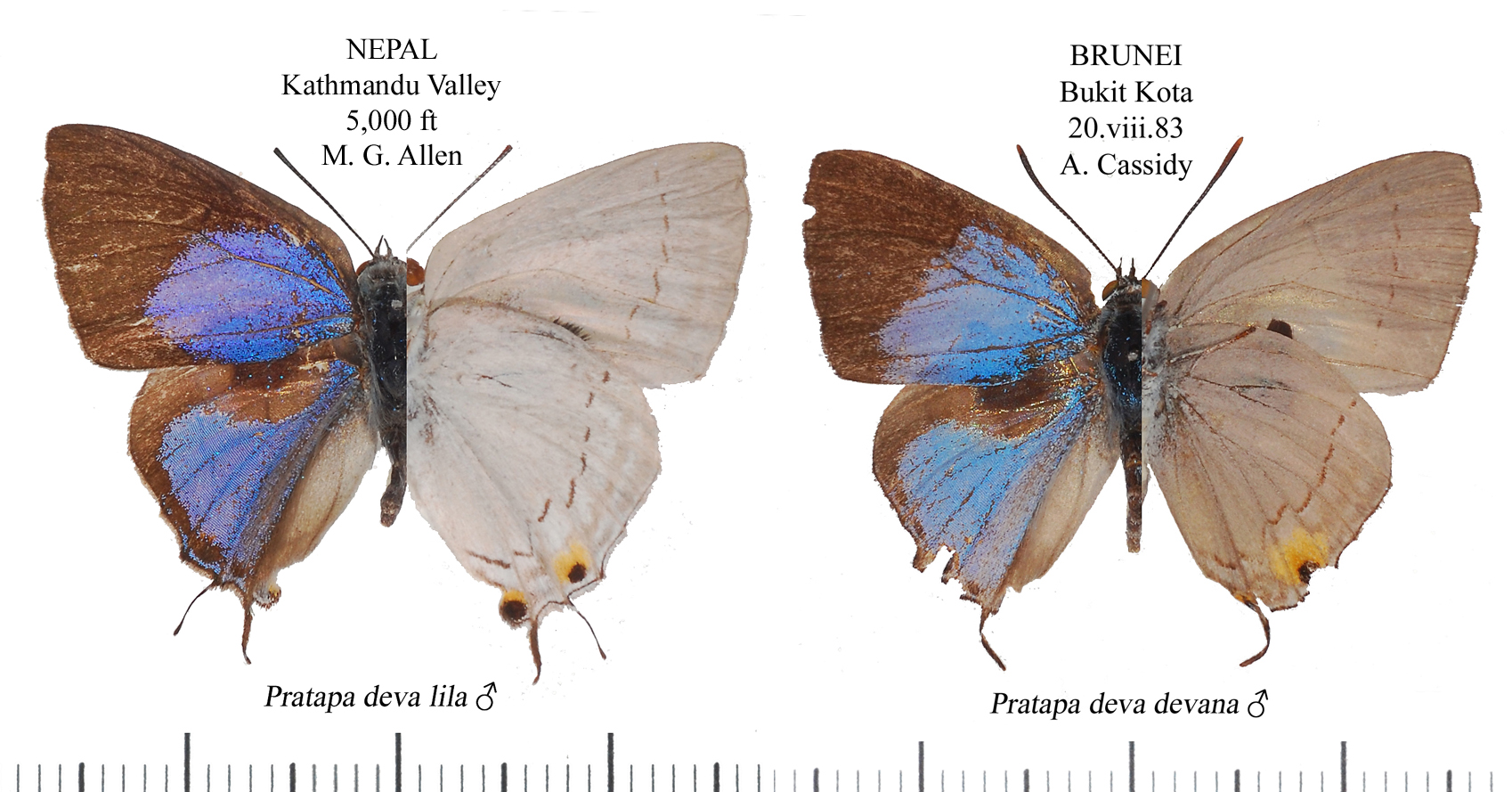
Museum specimen

==== Genus: Rachana ====
===== Rachana jalindra (banded royal) =====
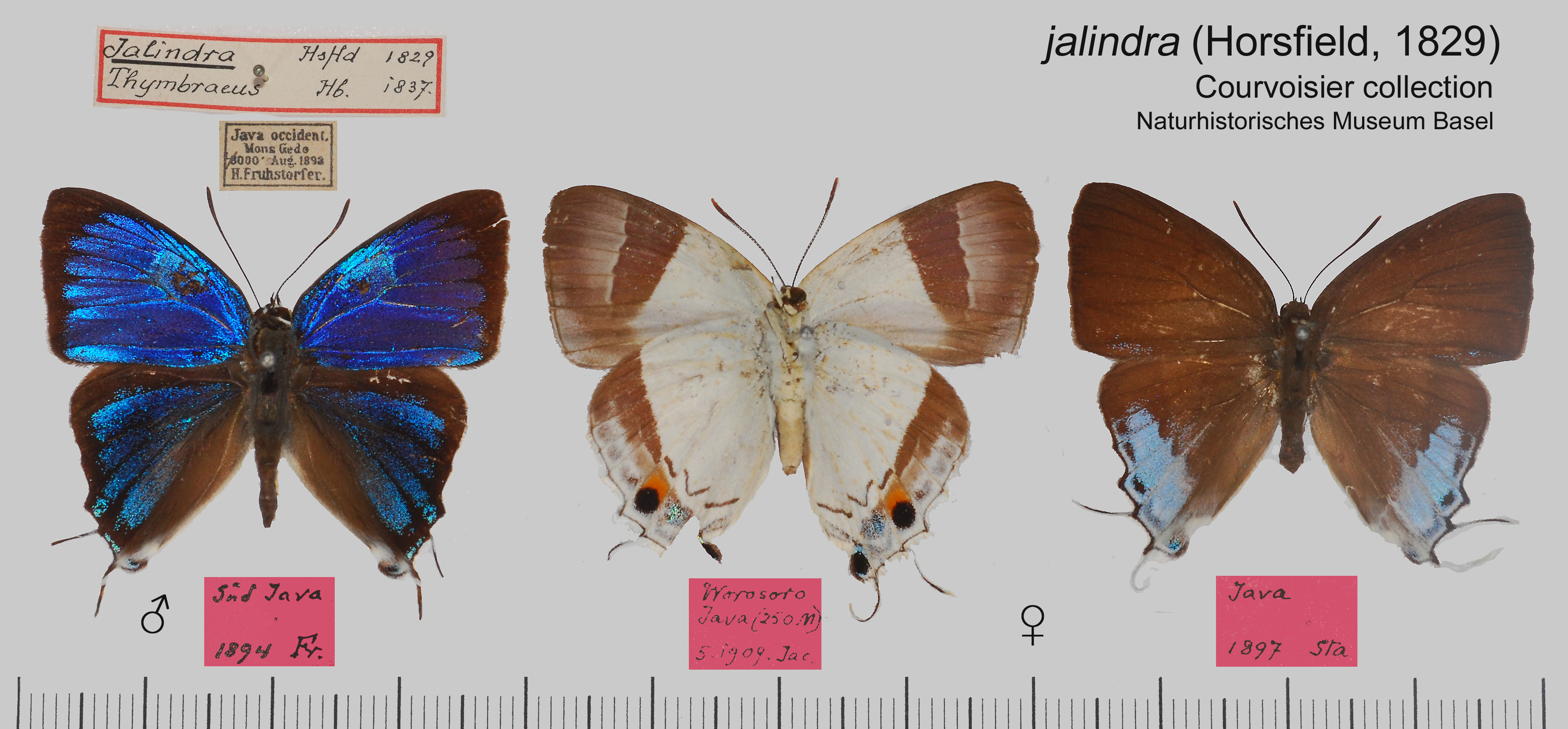
Museum specimen

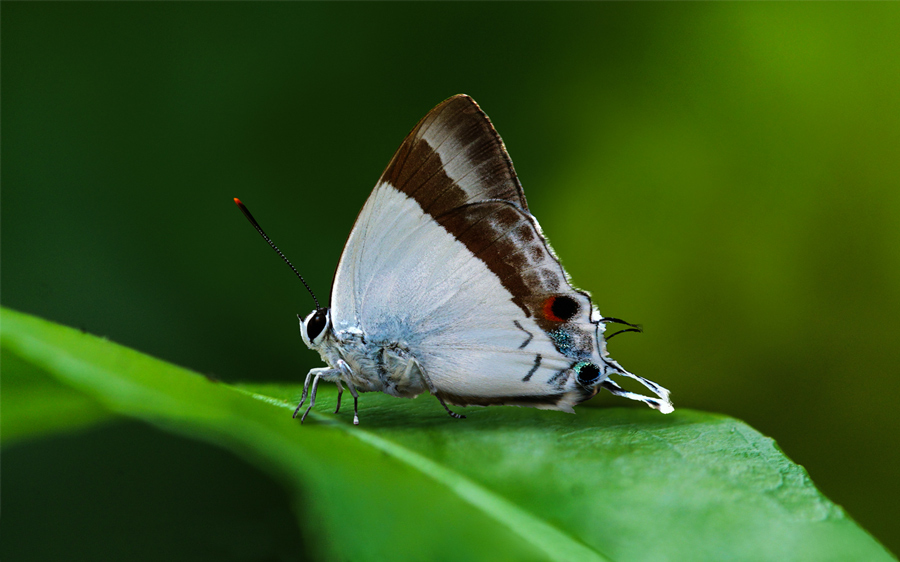
Ventral view

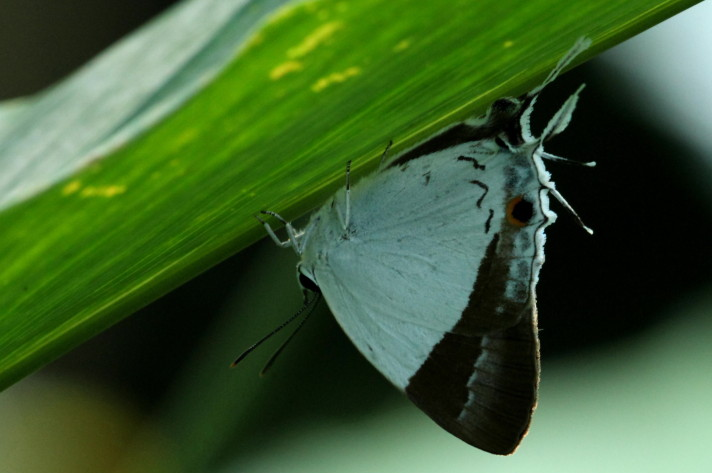
Ventral view

==== Genus: Rapala ====
===== Rapala iarbus (common red flash) =====
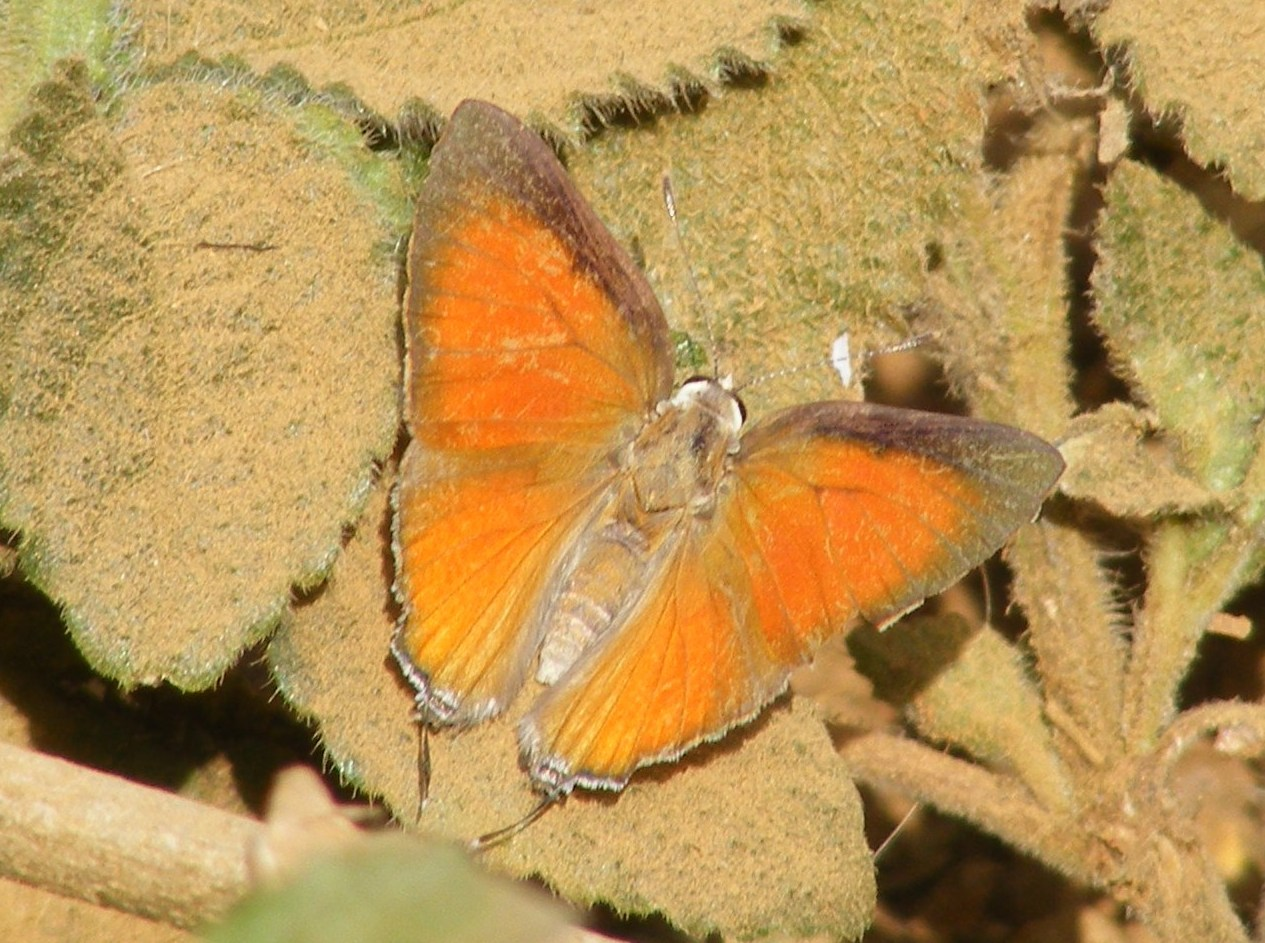
Dorsal view

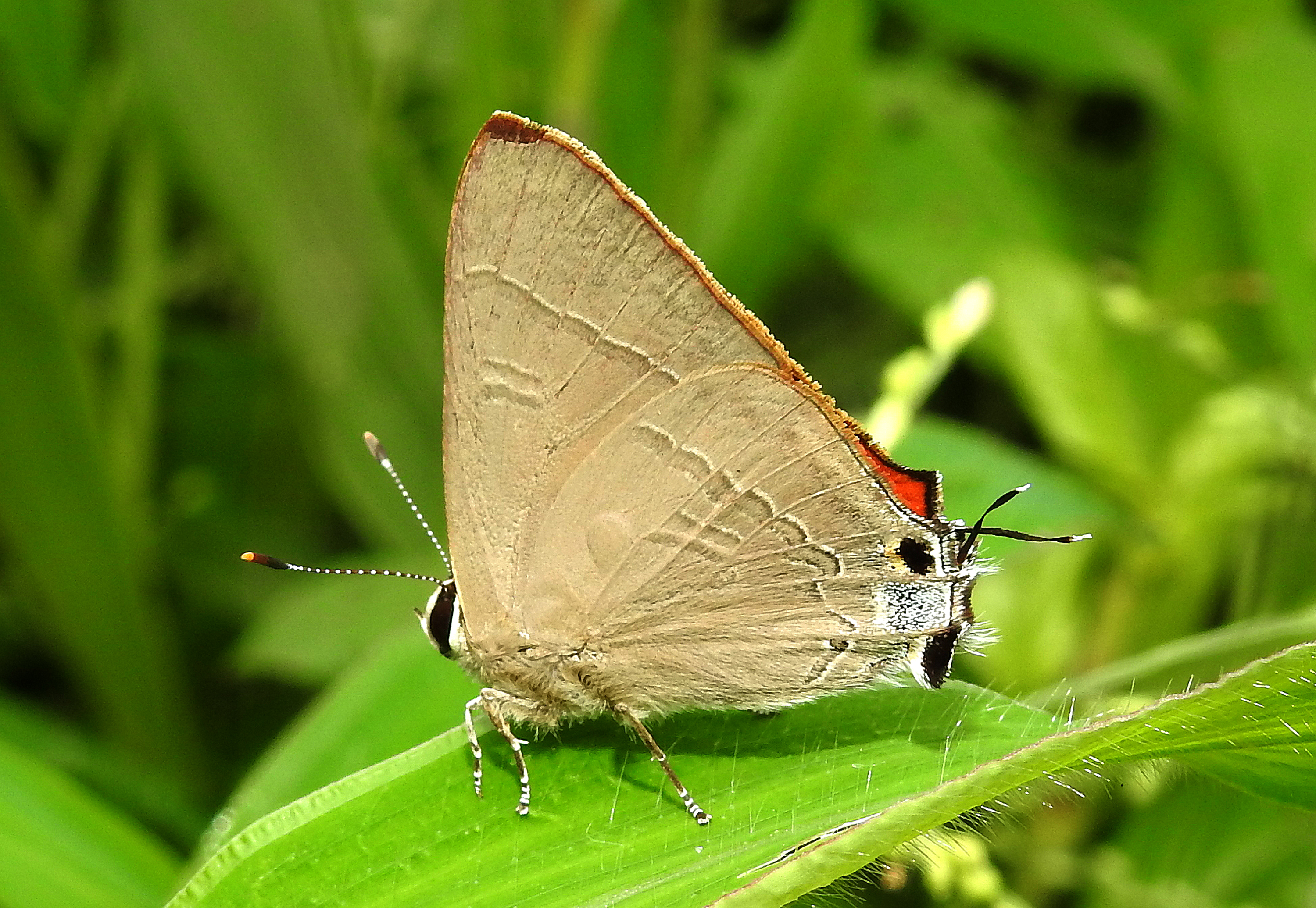
Ventral view

===== Rapala lankana (Malabar flash) =====
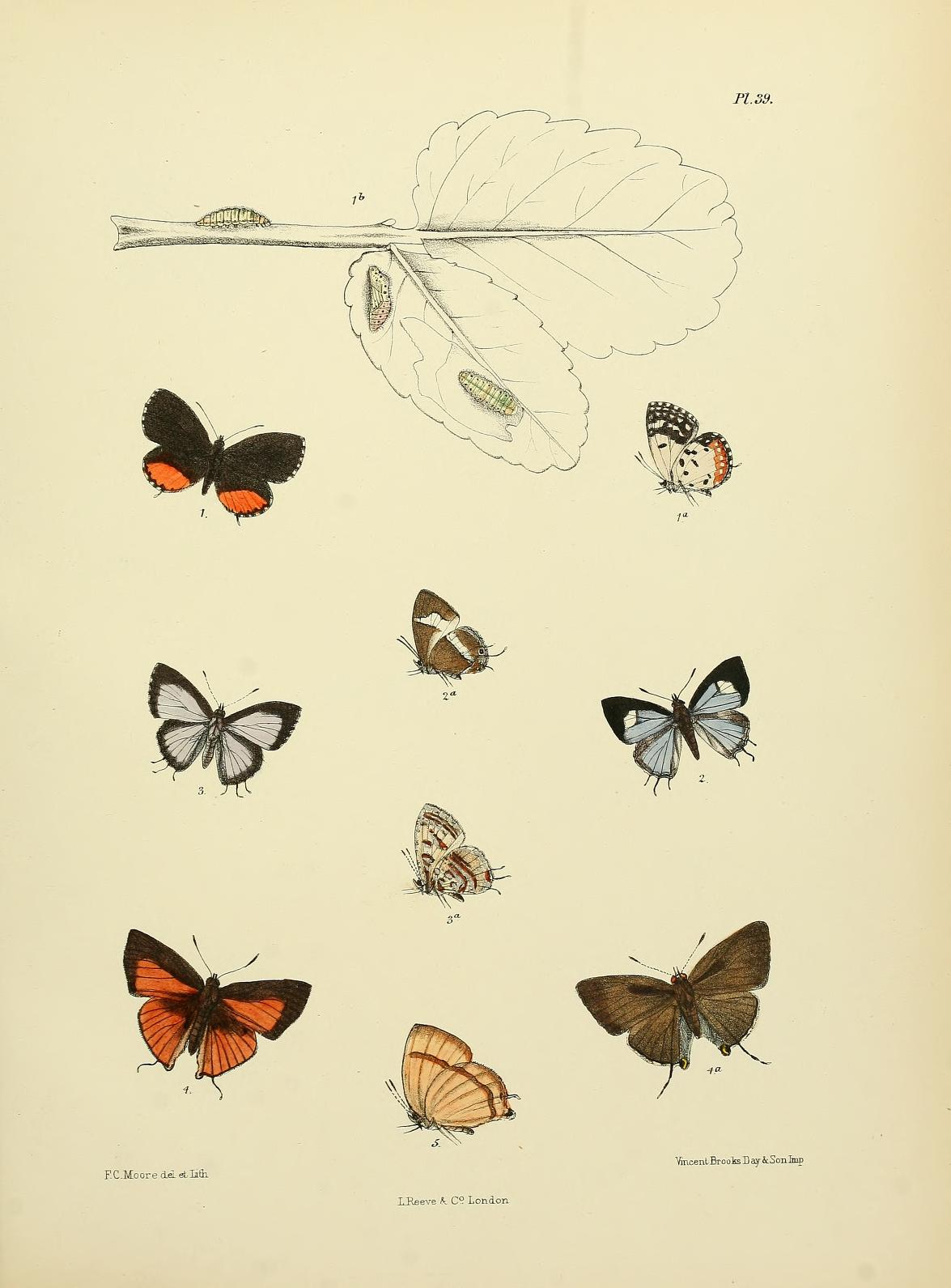
Illustration

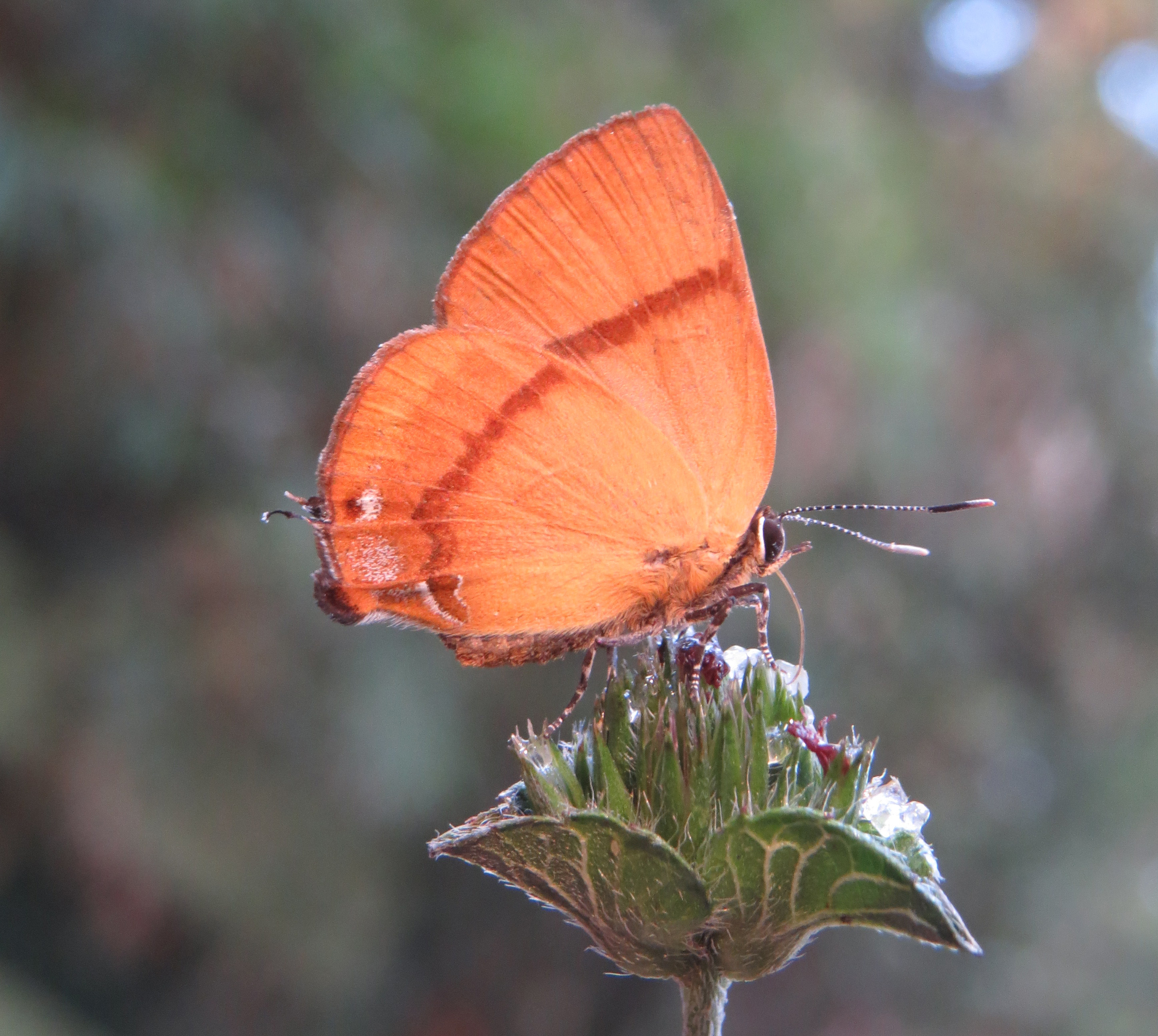
Ventral view

===== Rapala manea (slate flash) =====
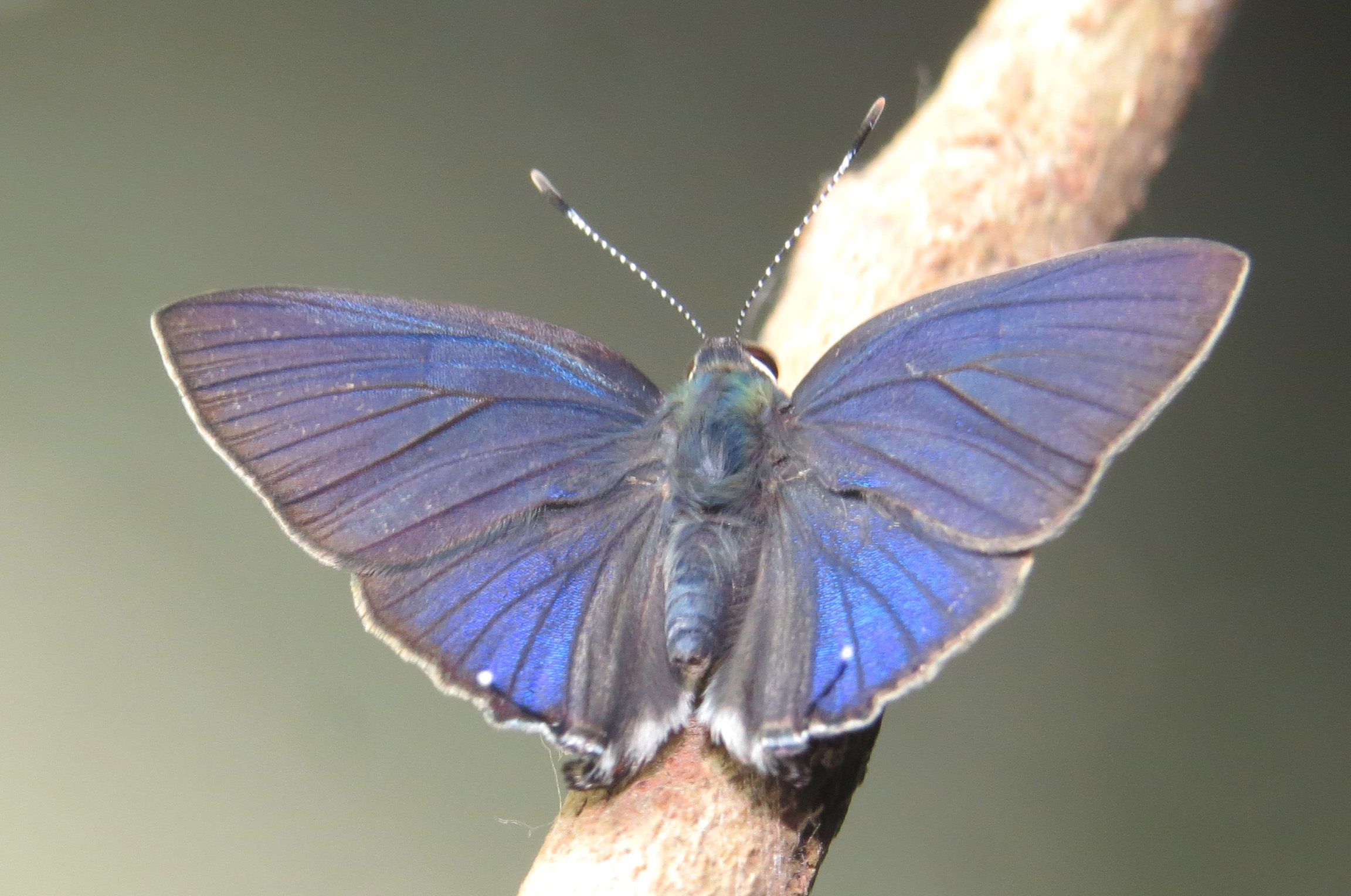
Dorsal view (male)

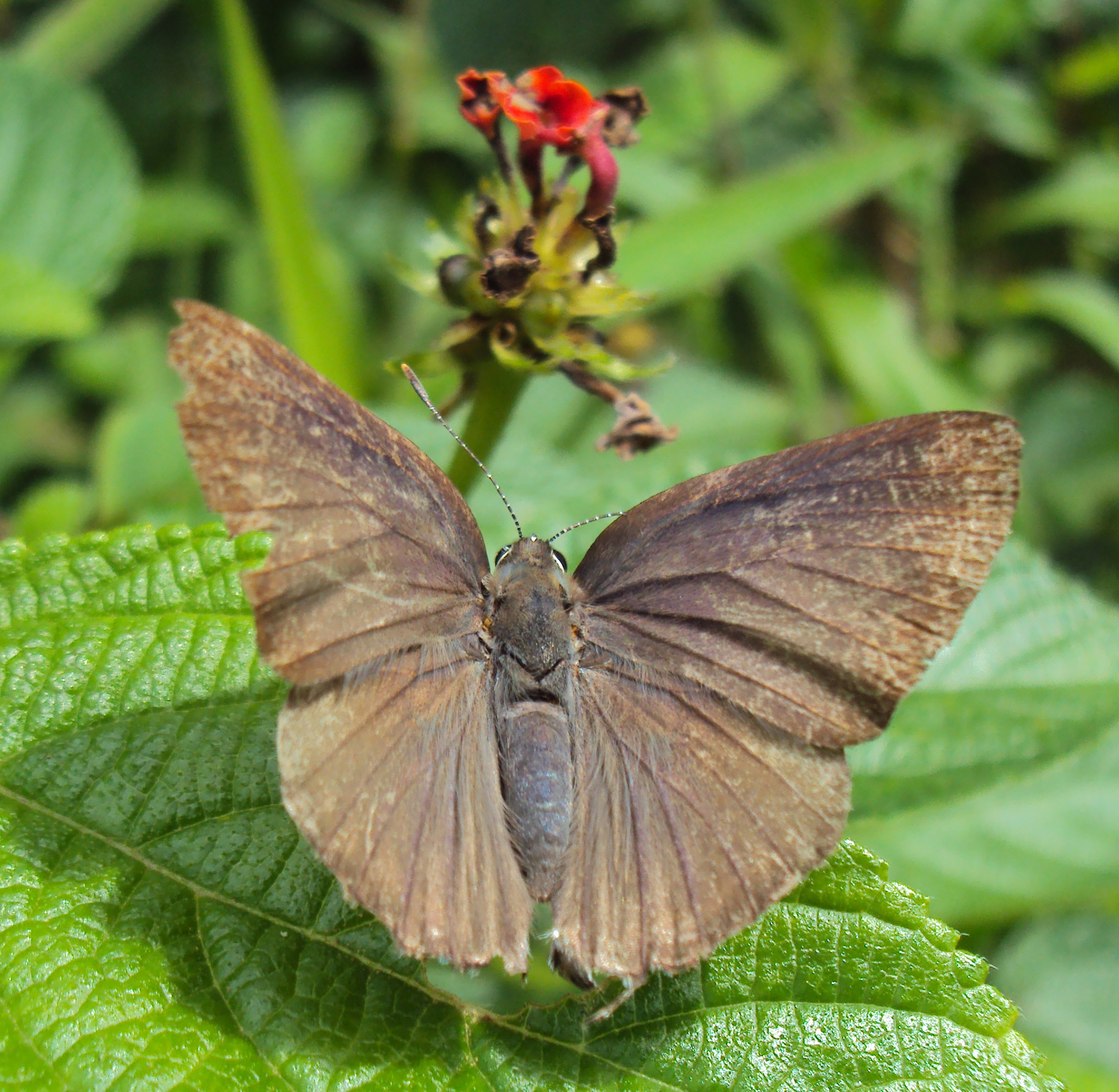
Dorsal view (female)

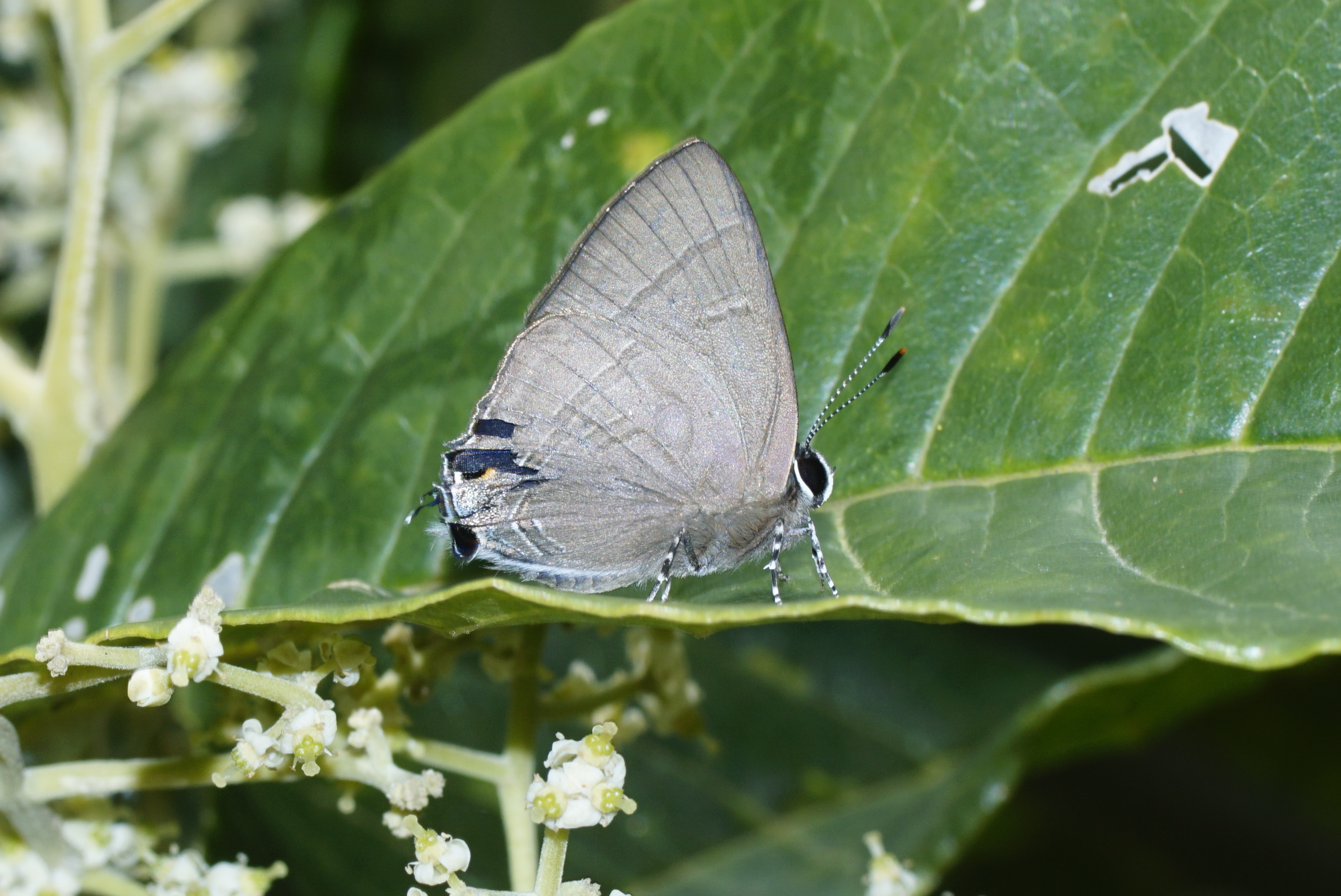
Ventral view (male)

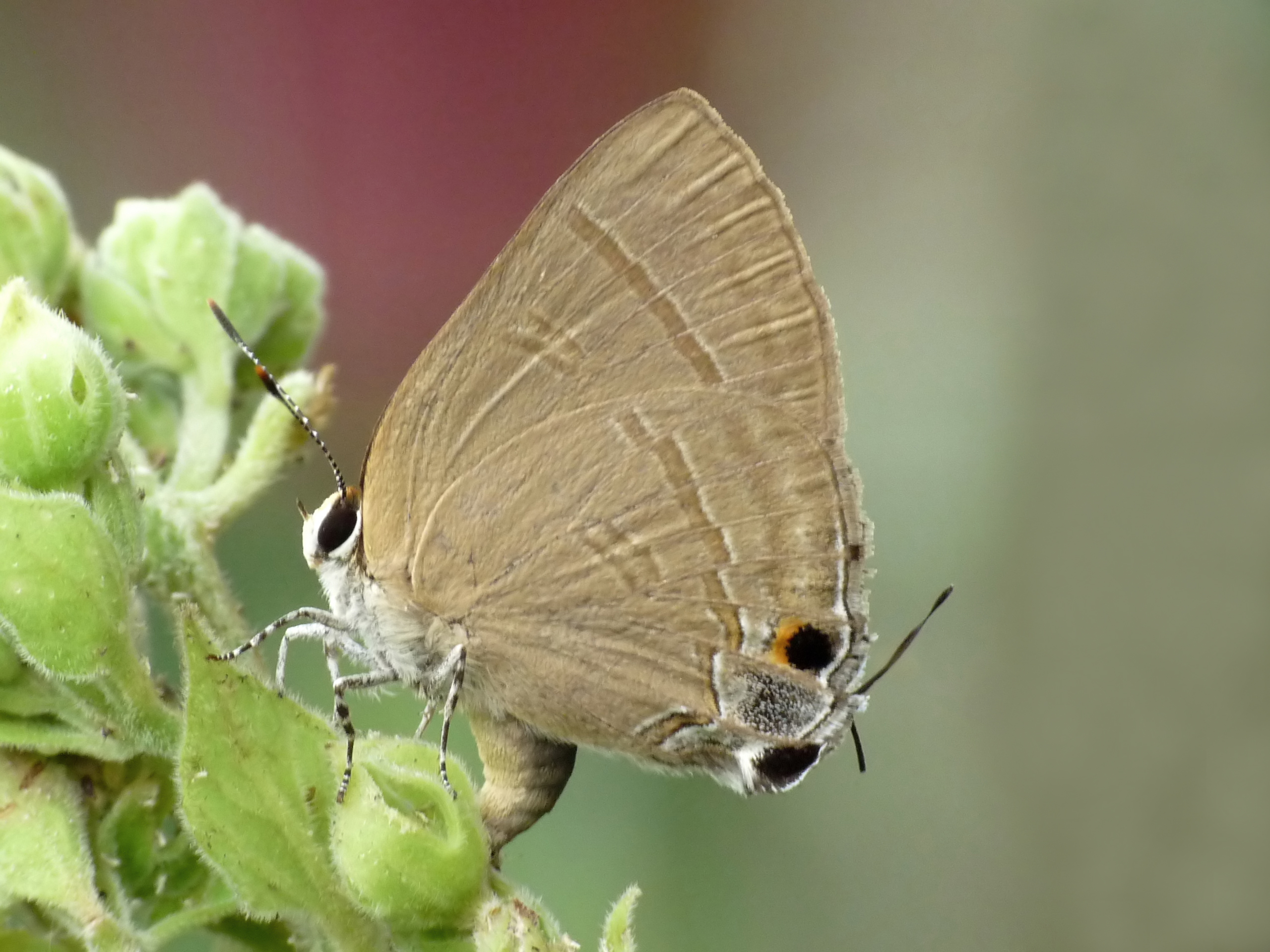
Ventral view (female)

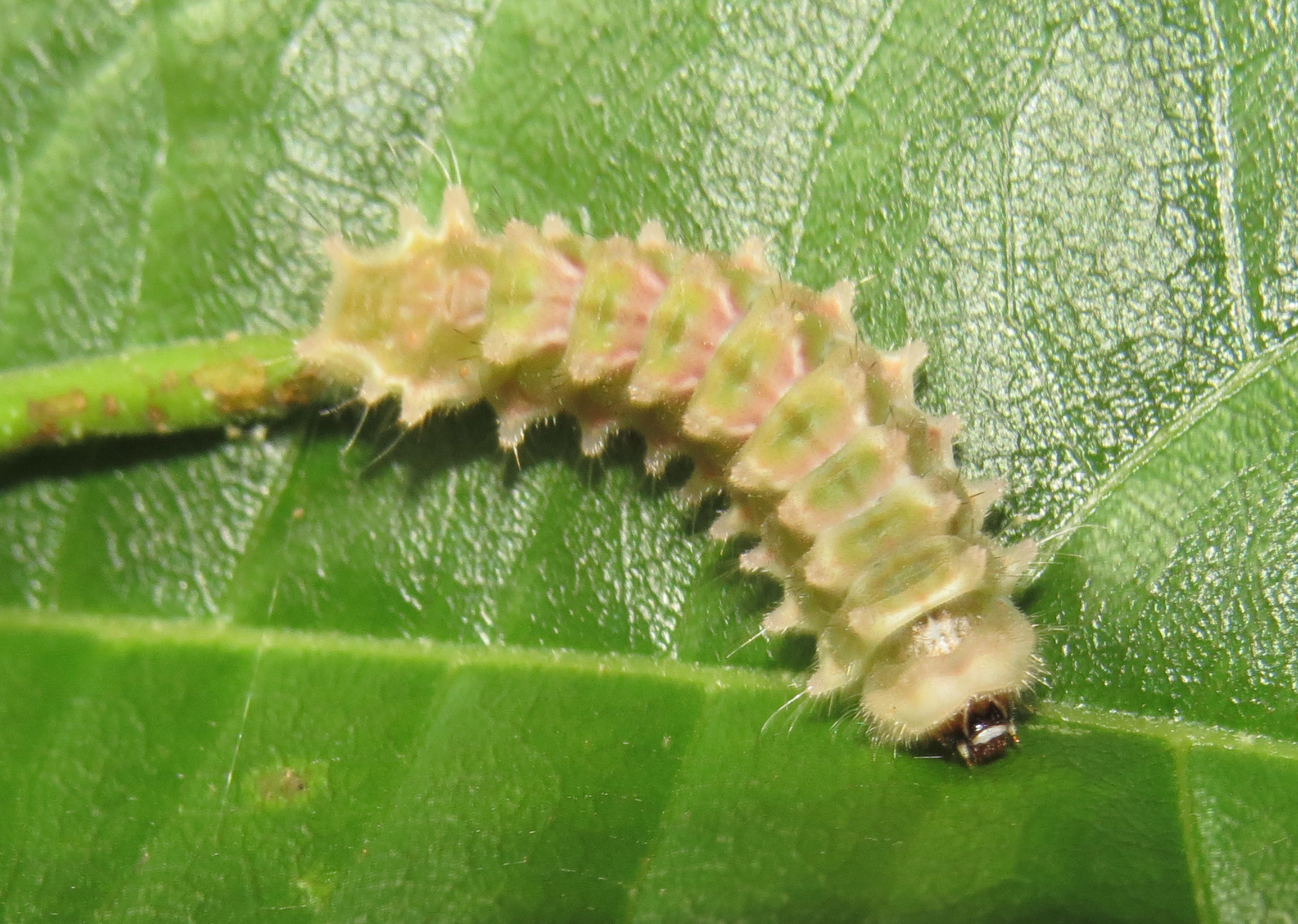
Larva

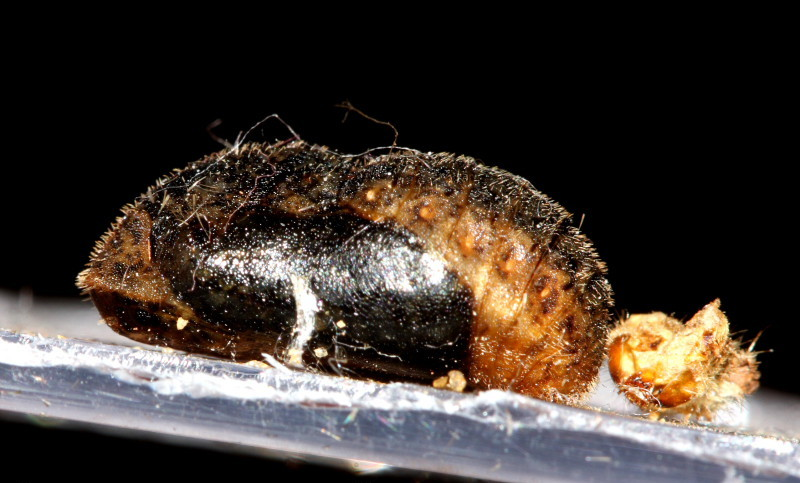
Pupa

===== Rapala varuna (indigo flash) =====
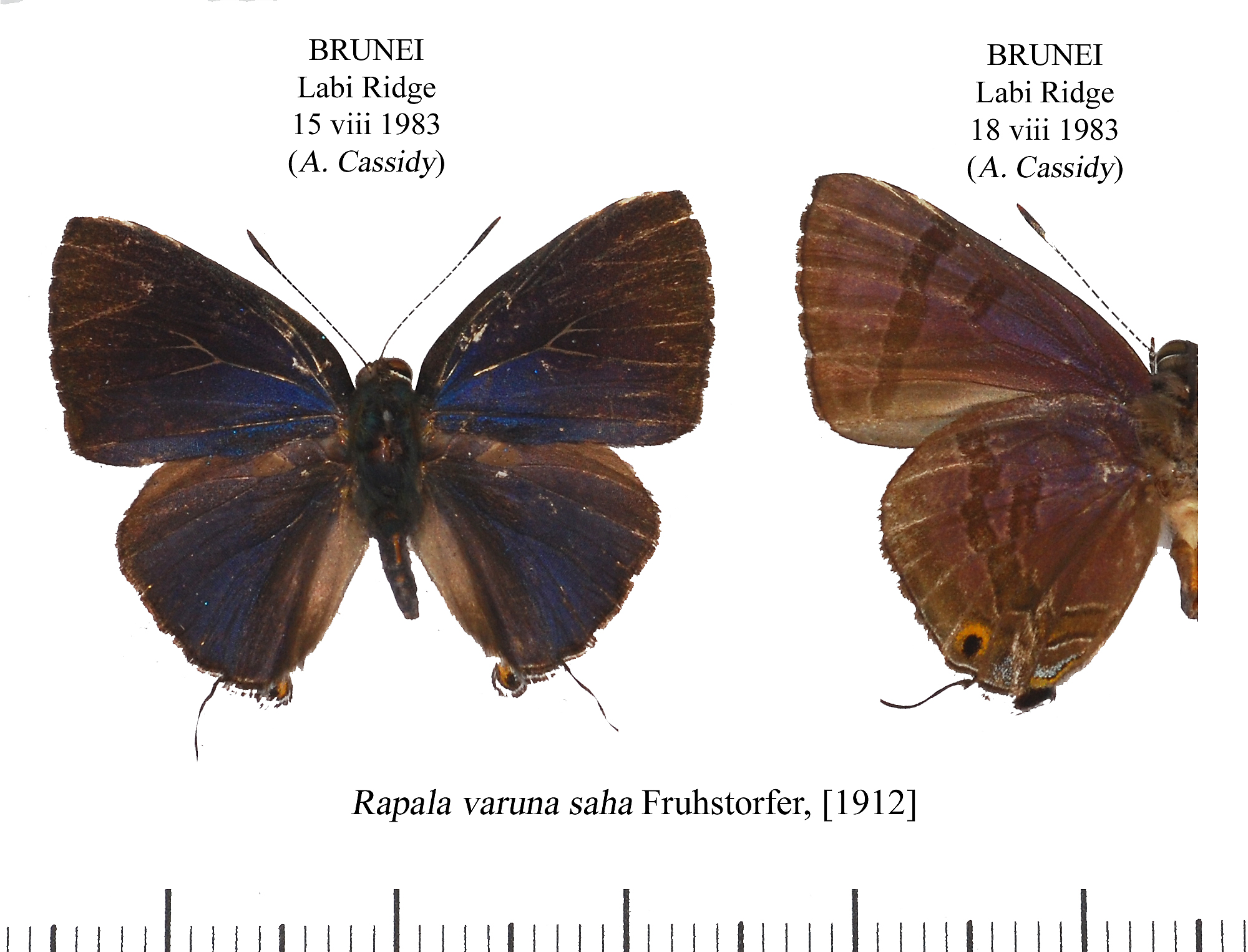
Museum specimen

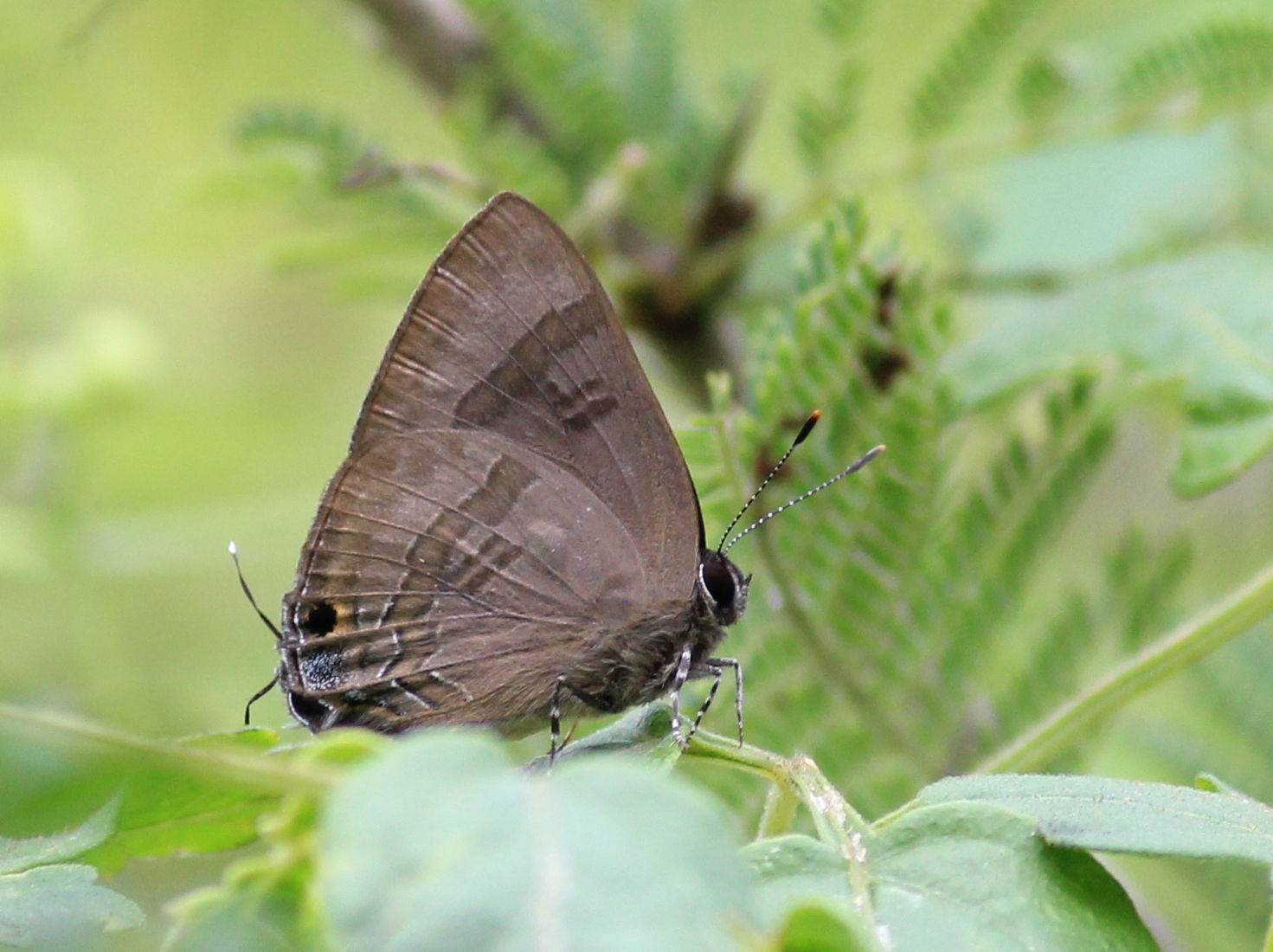
Ventral view

==== Genus: Rathinda ====
===== Rathinda amor (monkey puzzle) =====
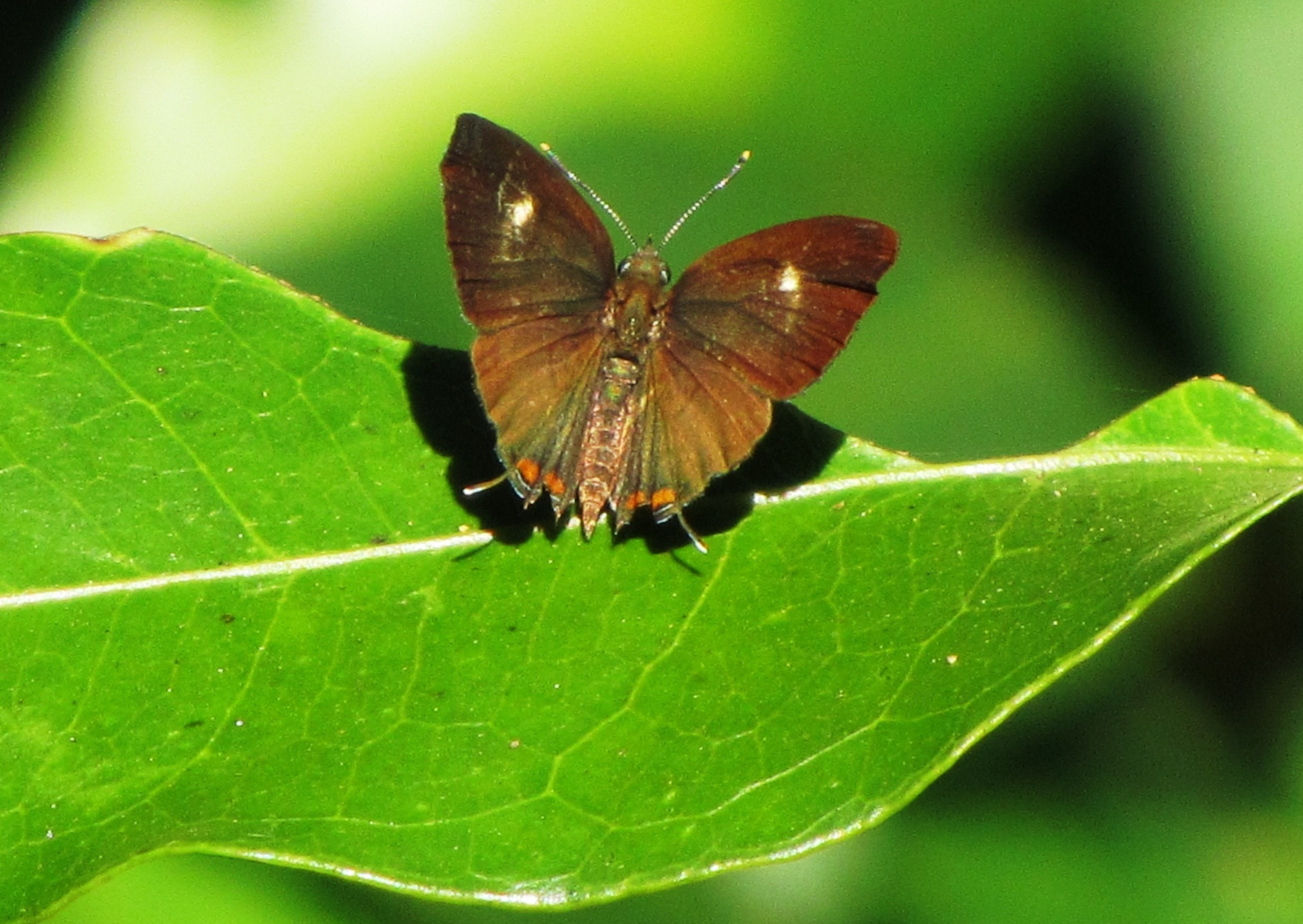
Dorsal view

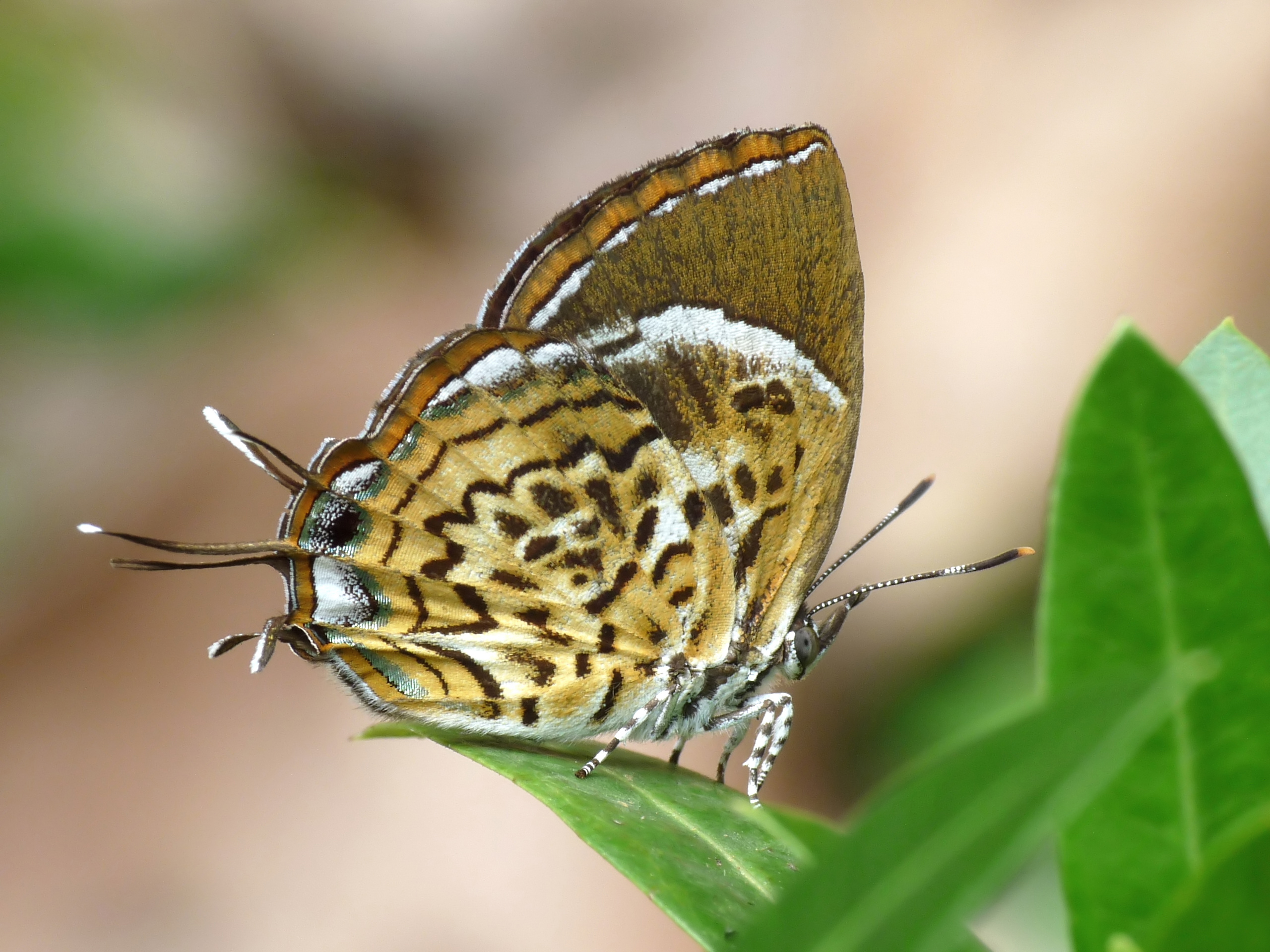
Ventral view

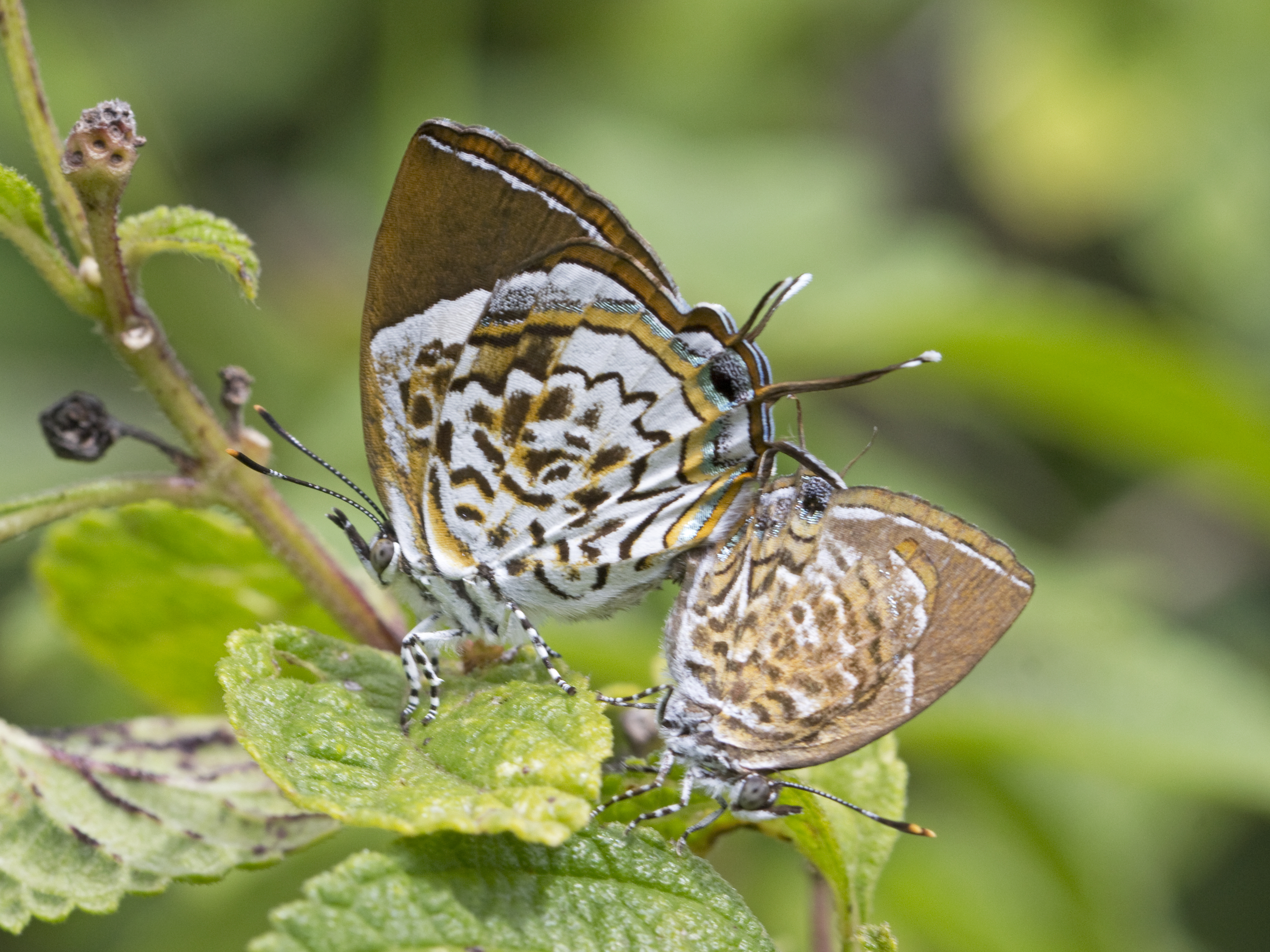
Mating pair

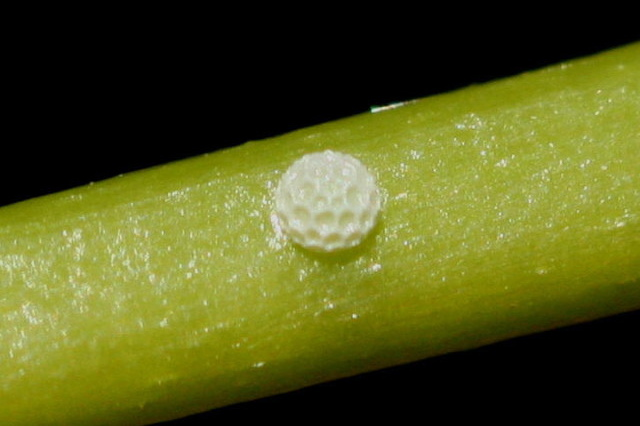
Egg

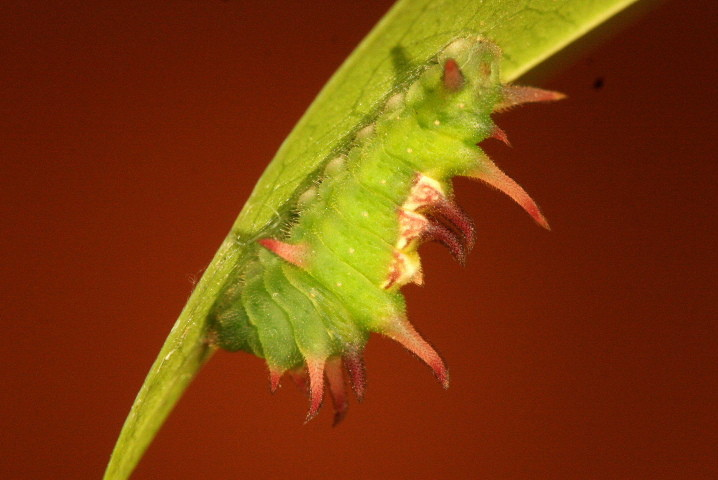
Larva

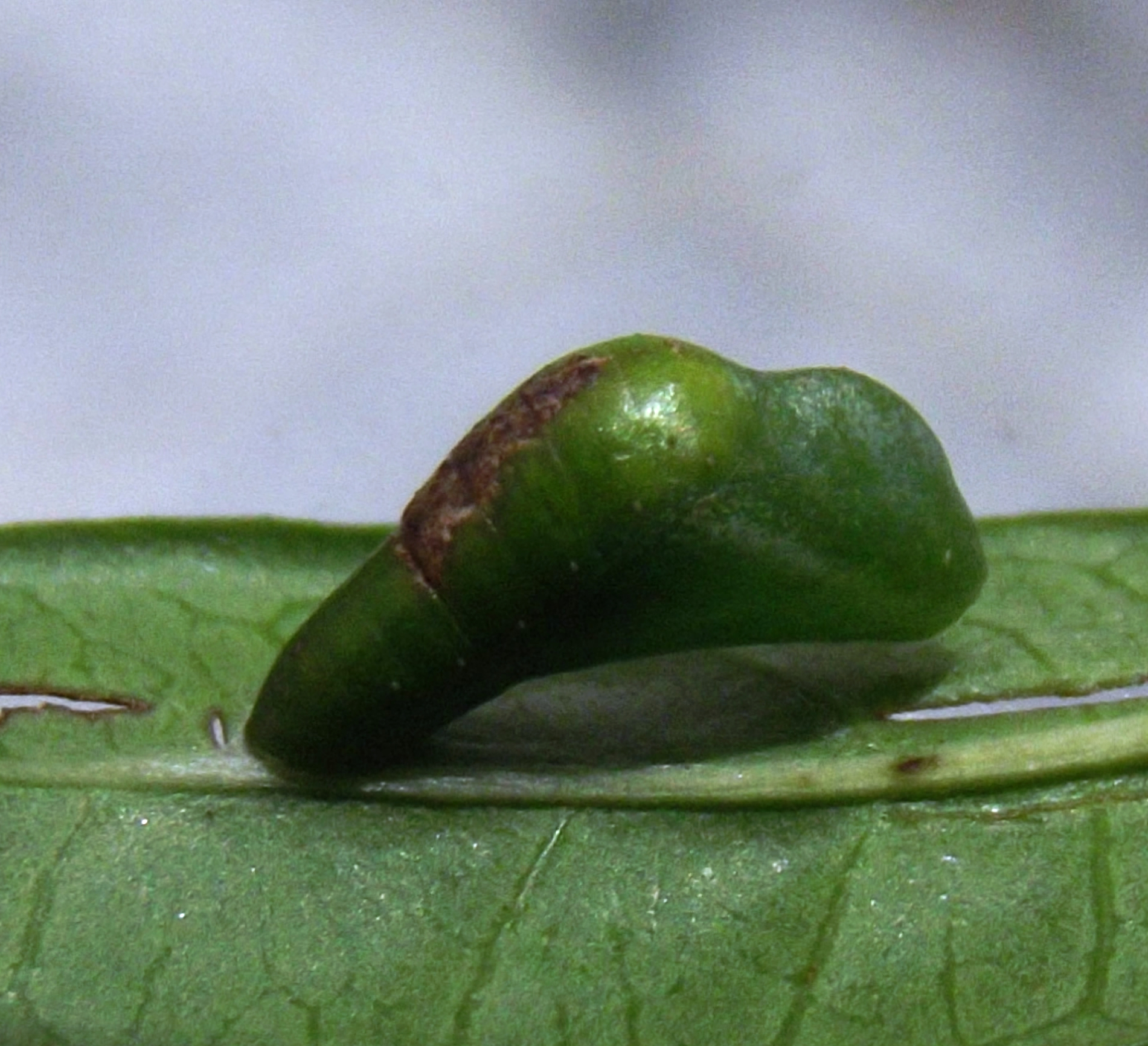
Pupa

==== Genus: Surendra ====
===== Surendra vivarna biplagiata (acacia blue) =====
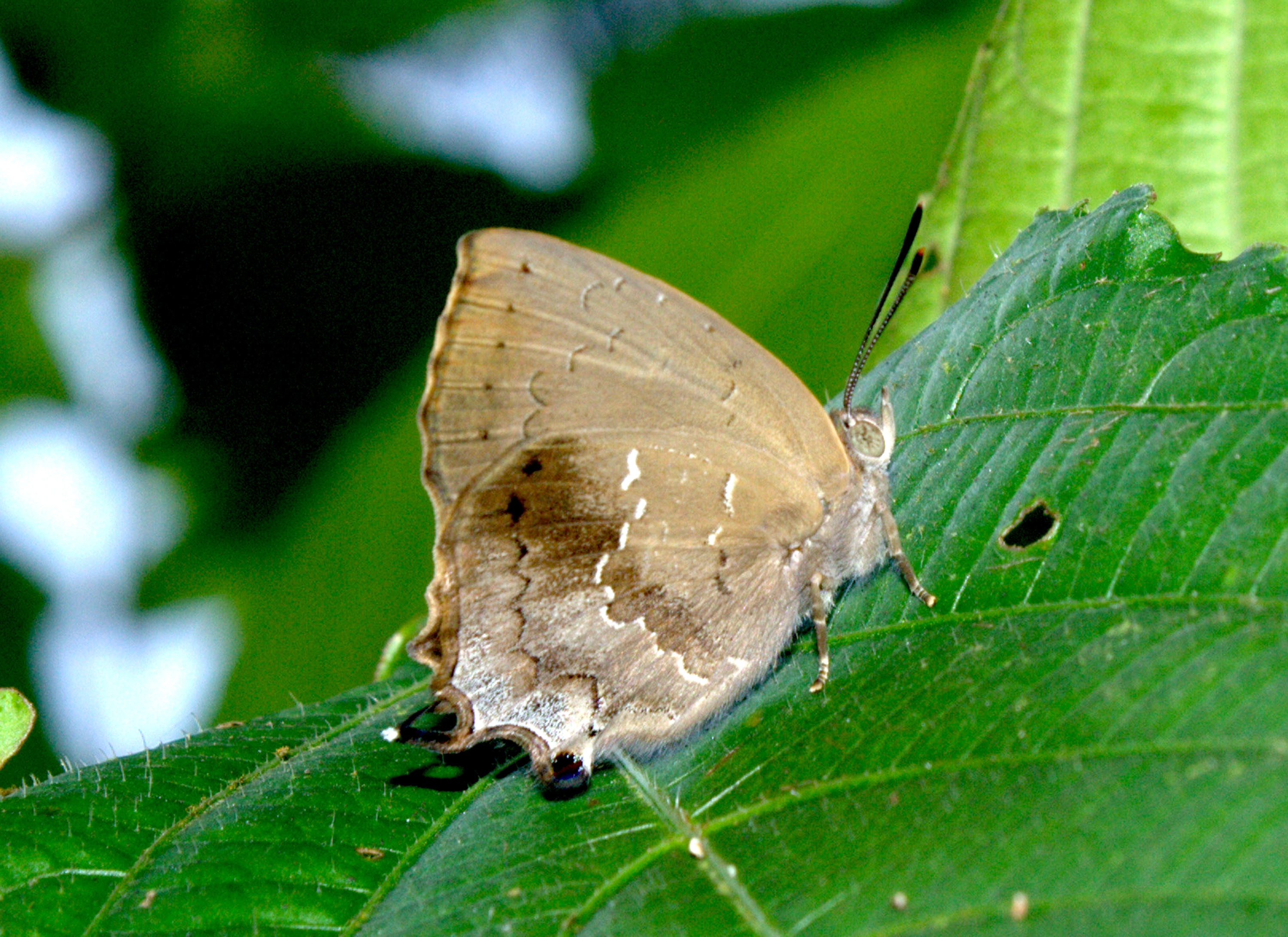
Ventral view (male)

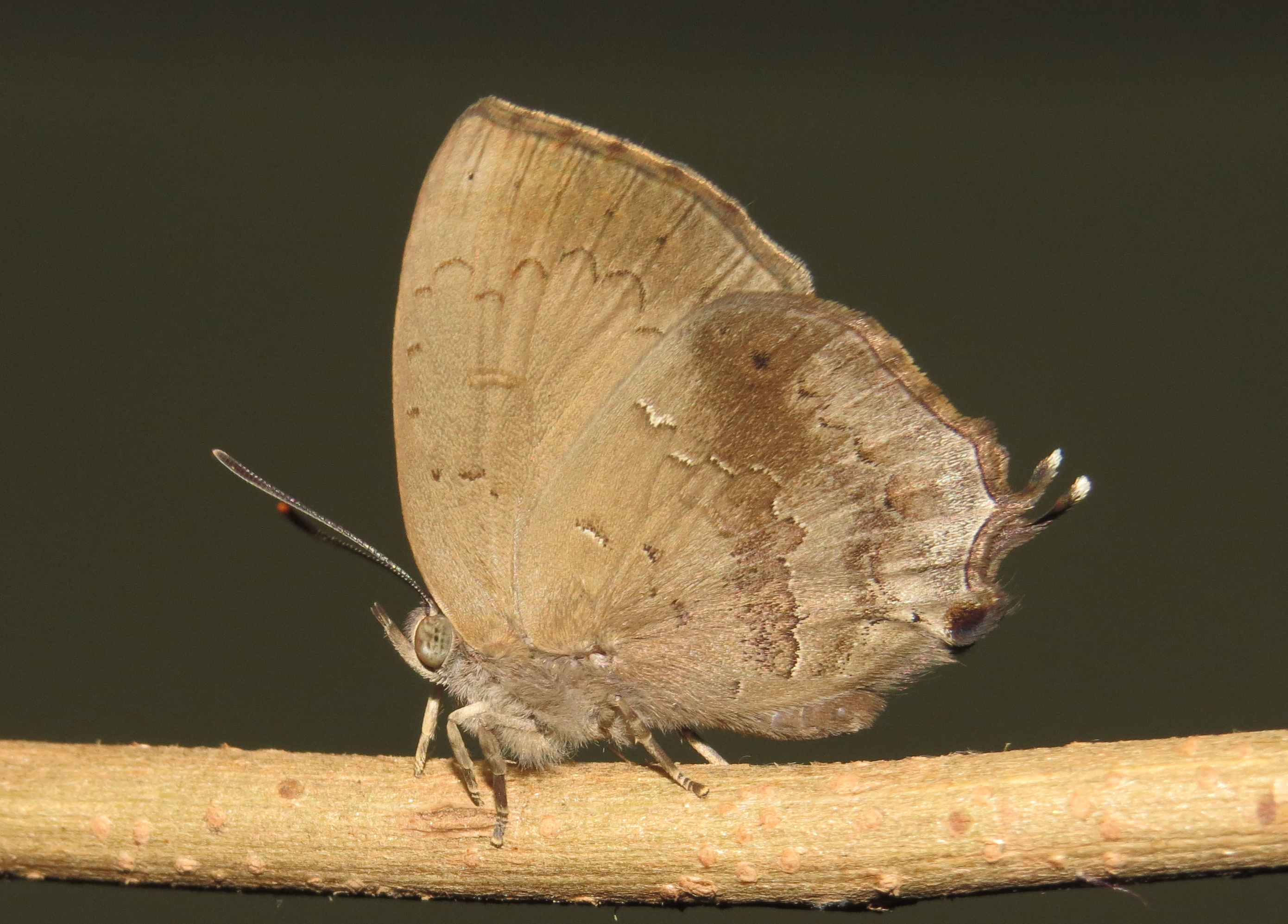
Ventral view (female)

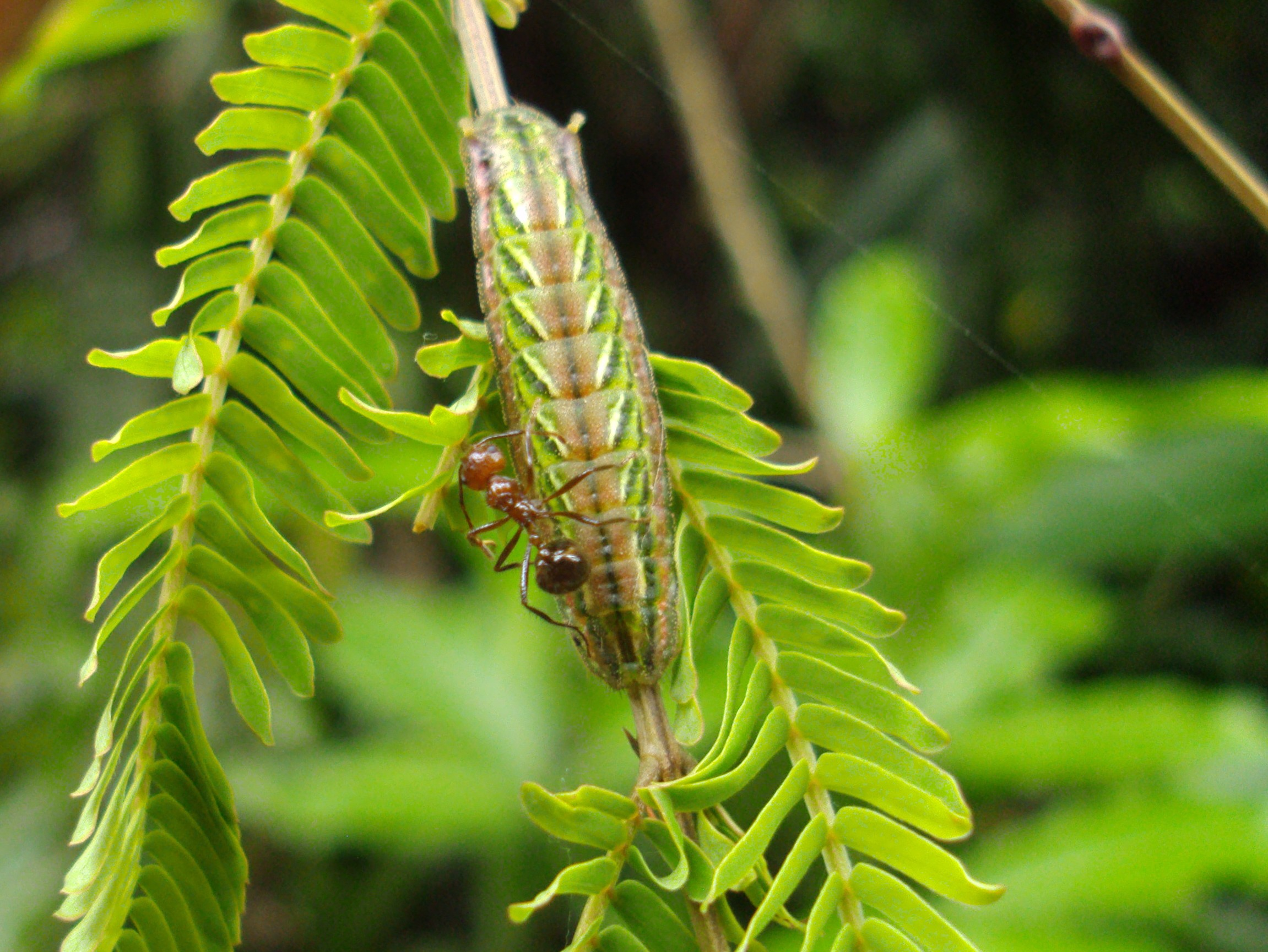
Larva

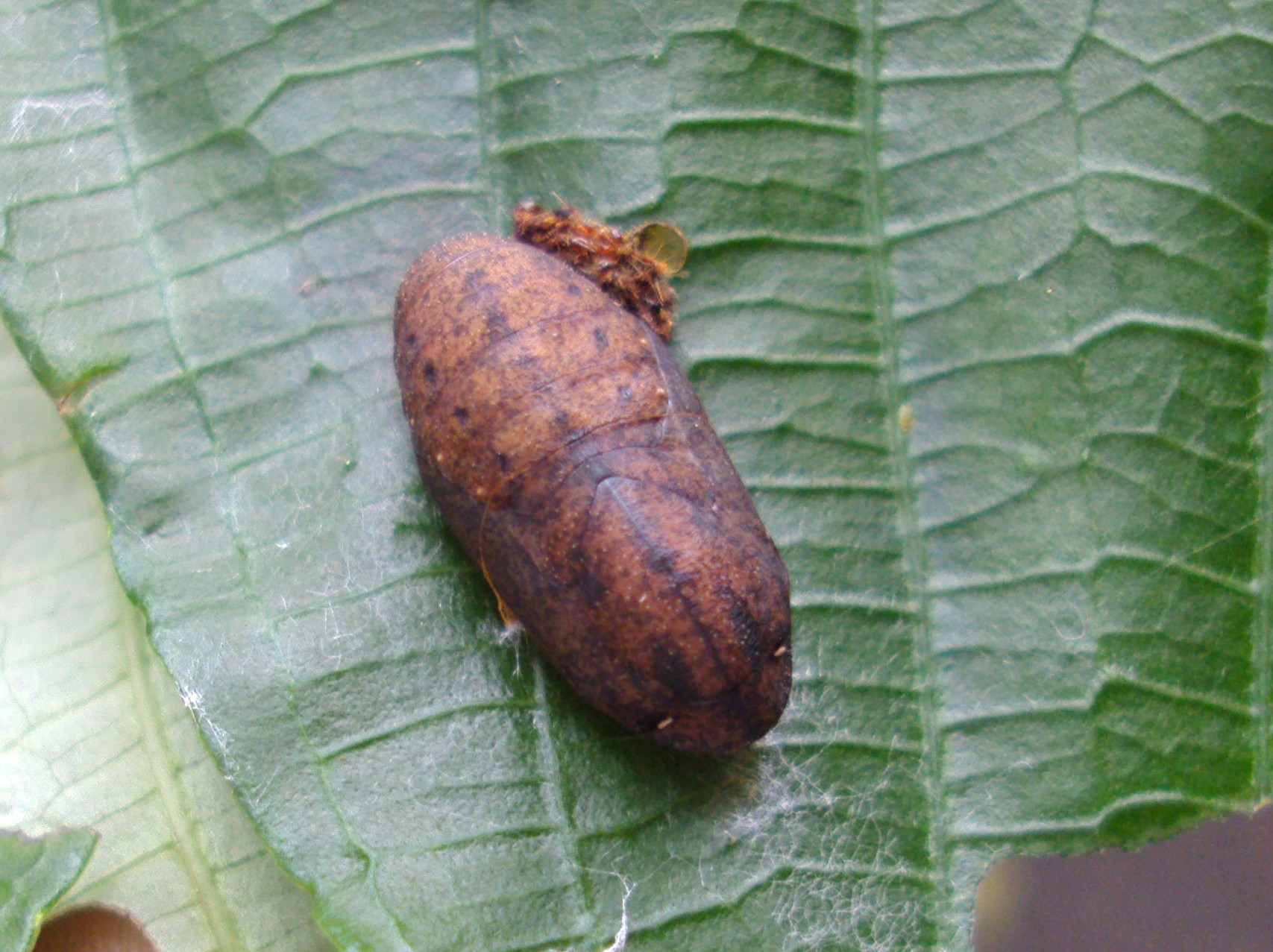
Pupa

==== Genus: Tajuria ====
===== Tajuria cippus (peacock royal) =====
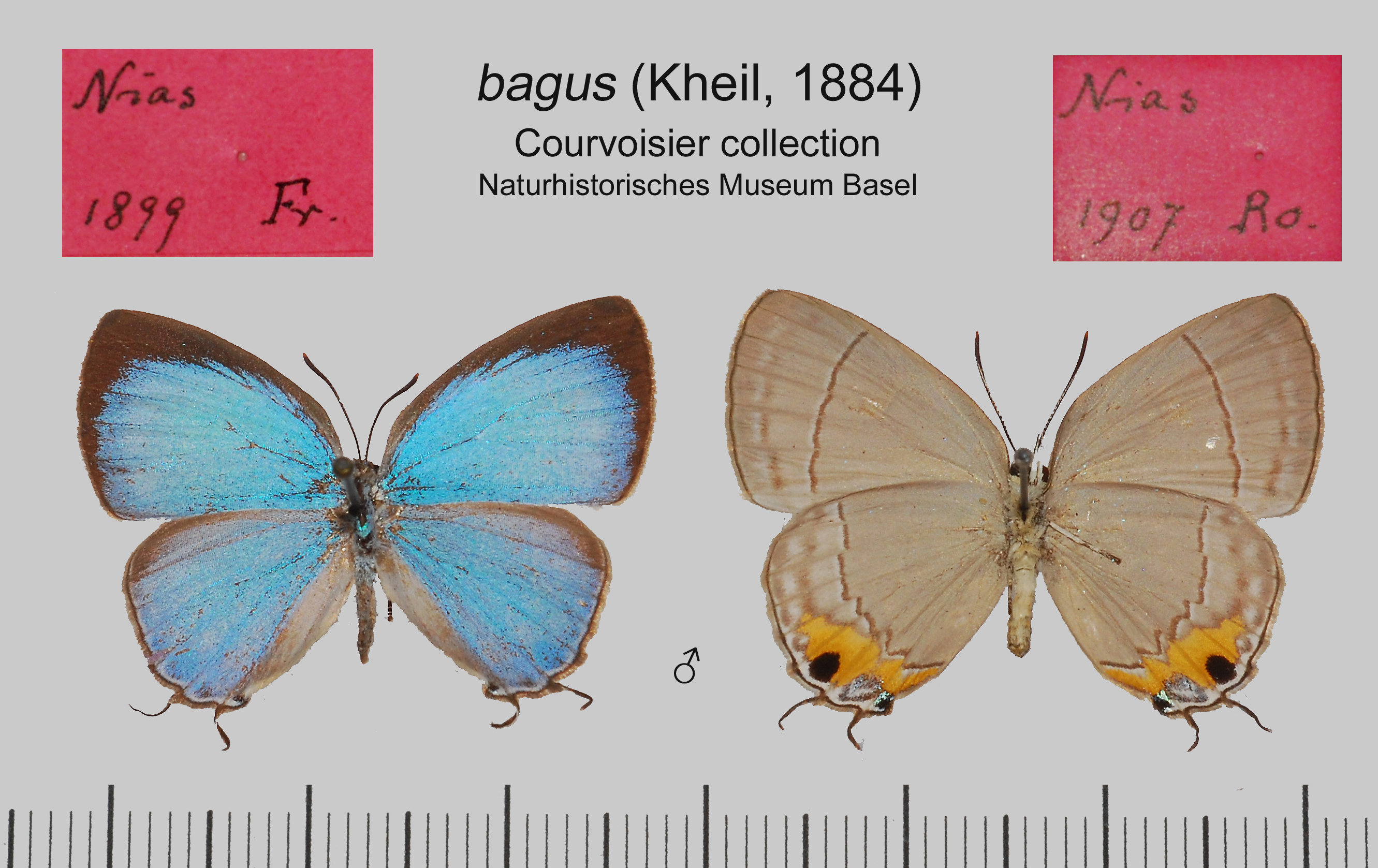
Museum specimen

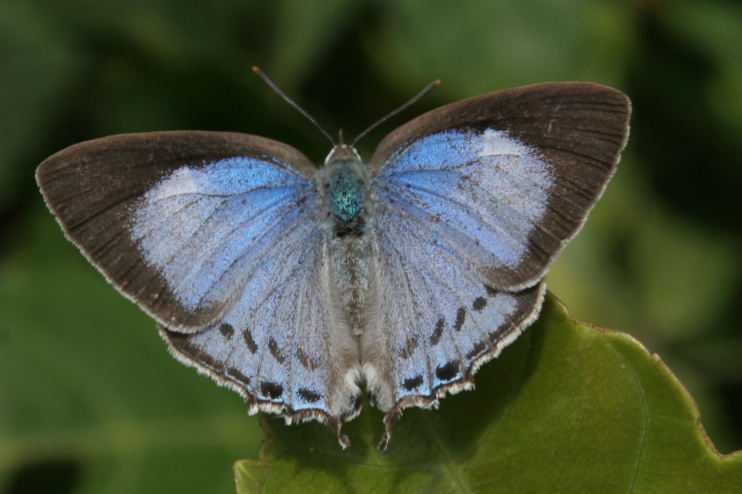
Dorsal view

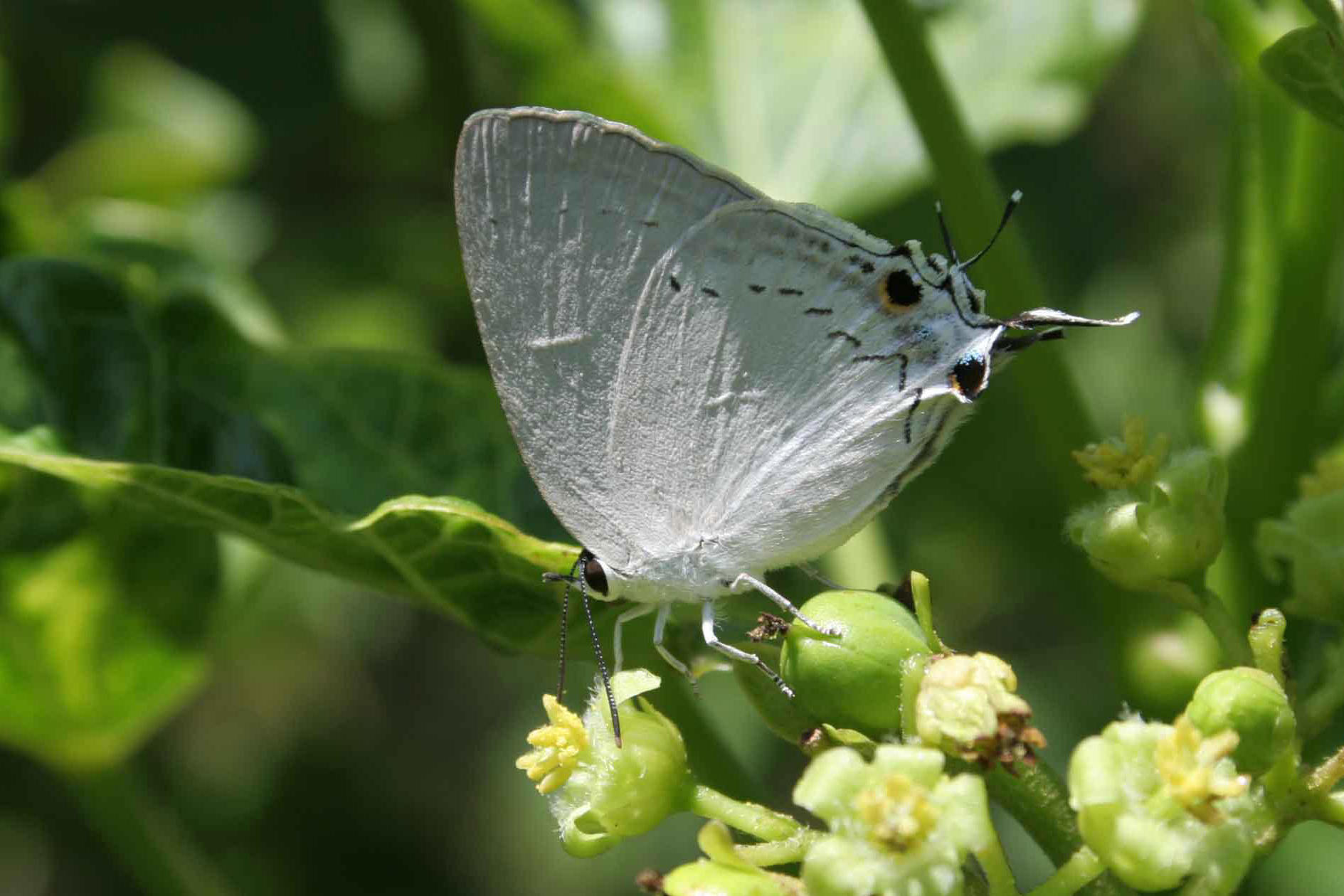
Ventral view

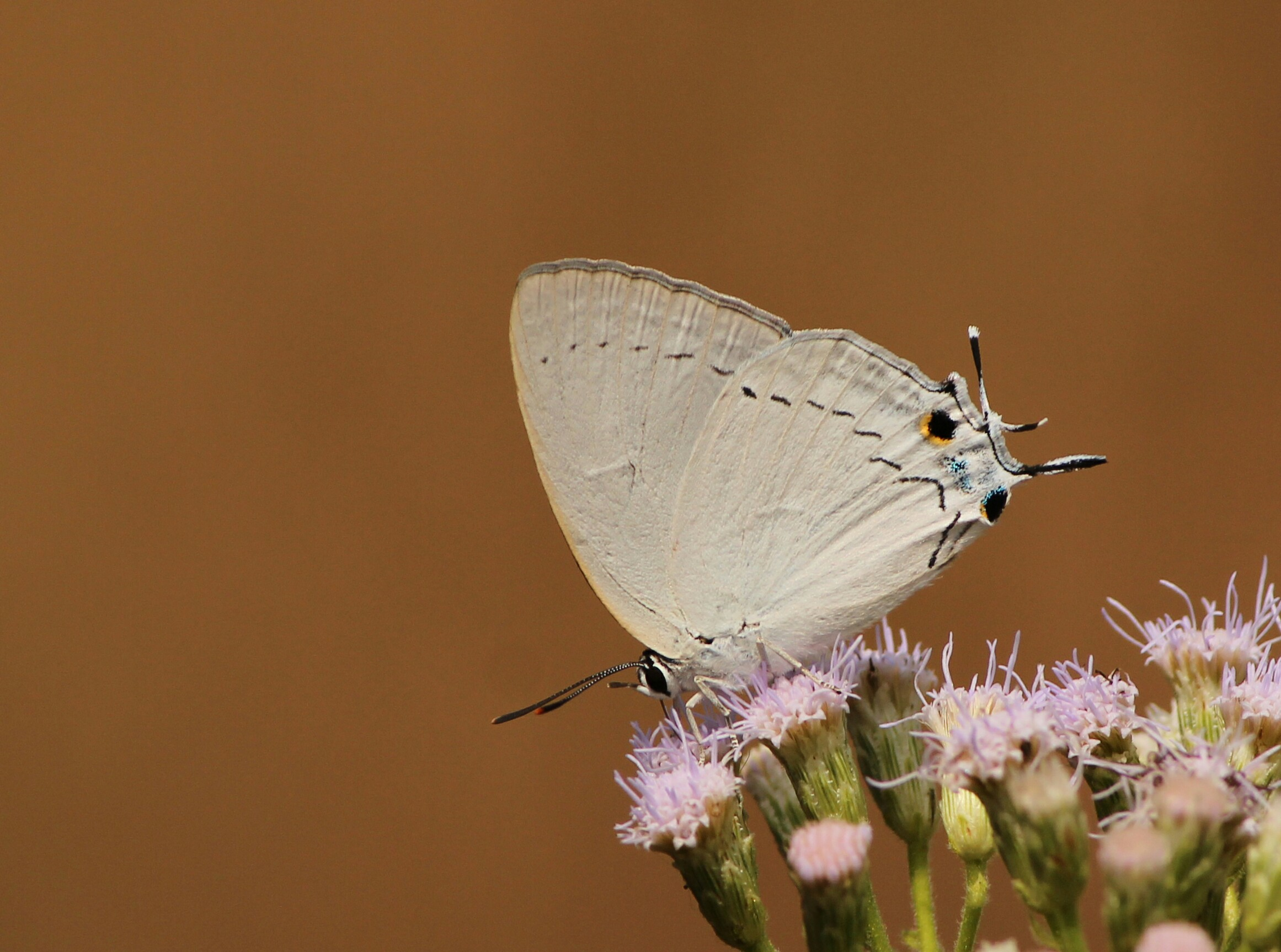
Ventral view

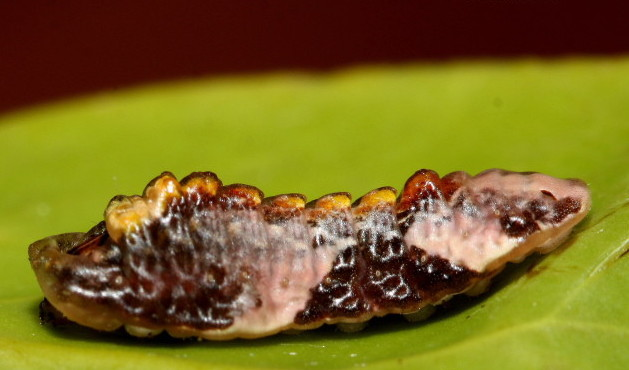
Larva

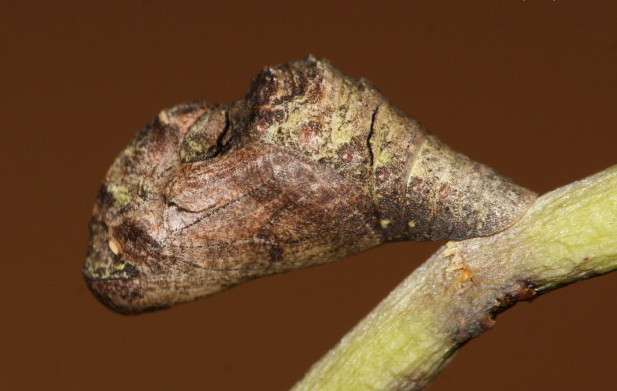
Pupa

===== Tajuria jehana (plains blue royal) =====
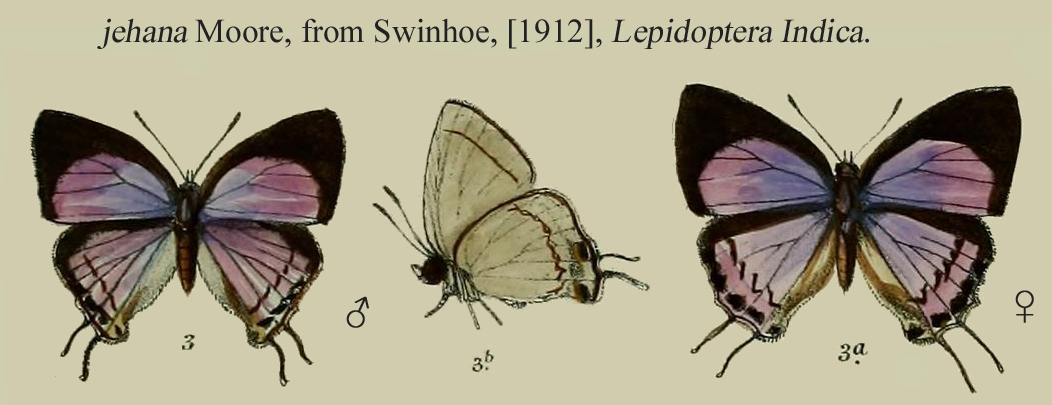
Illustration

===== Tajuria maculata (spotted royal) =====
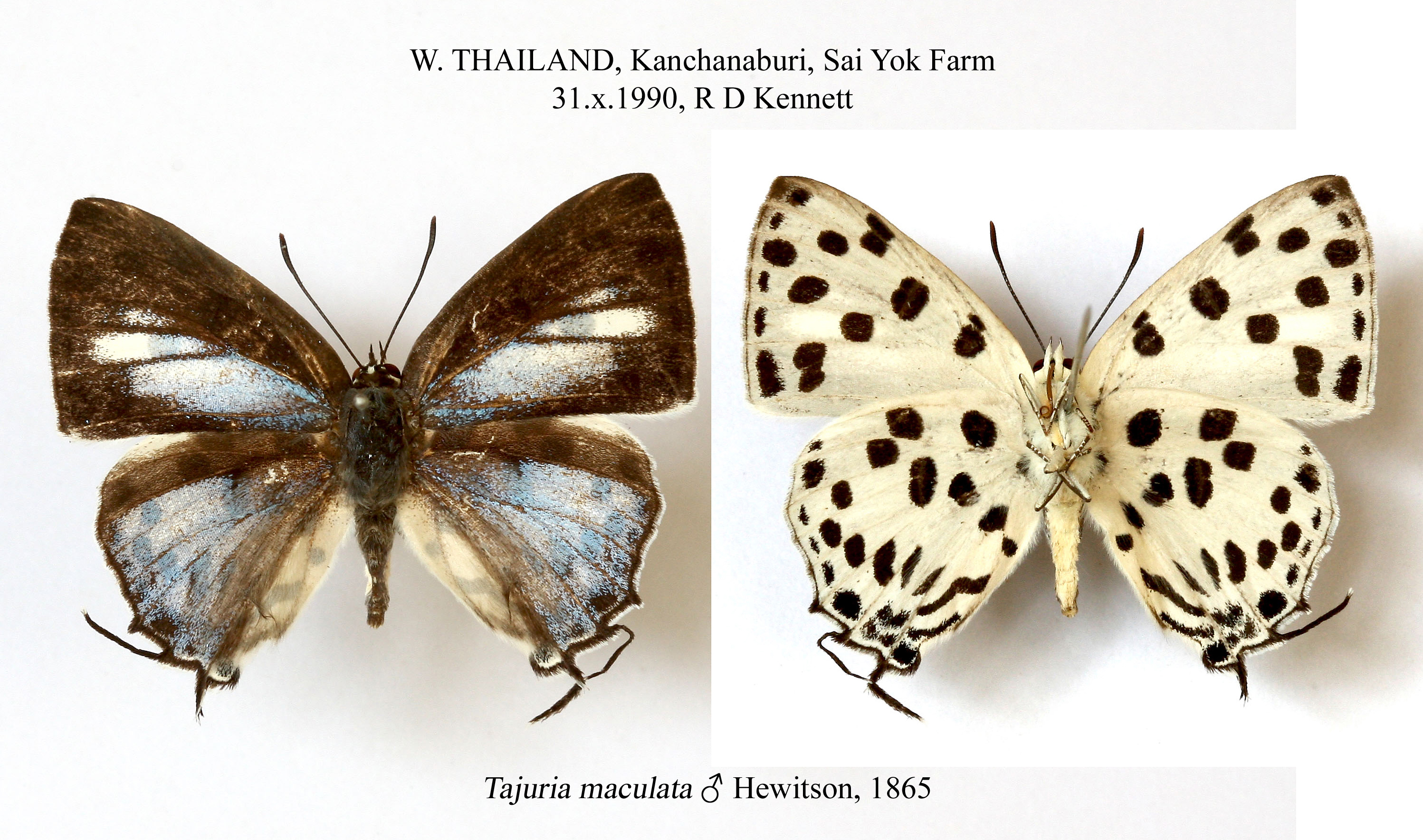
Museum specimen

===== Tajuria melastigma (branded royal) =====
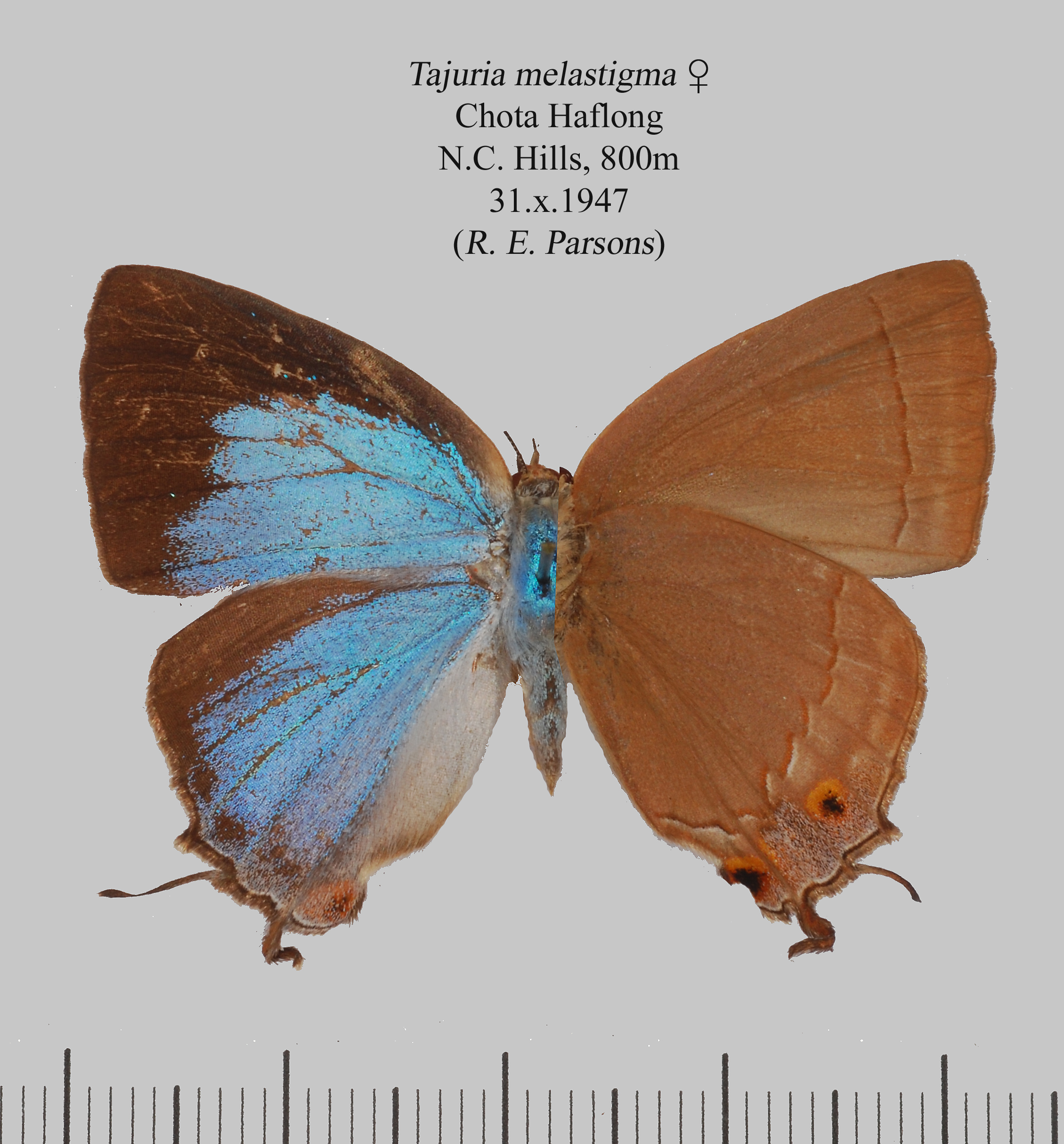
Museum specimen

==== Genus: Thaduka ====
===== Thaduka multicaudata (many-tailed oak-blue) =====
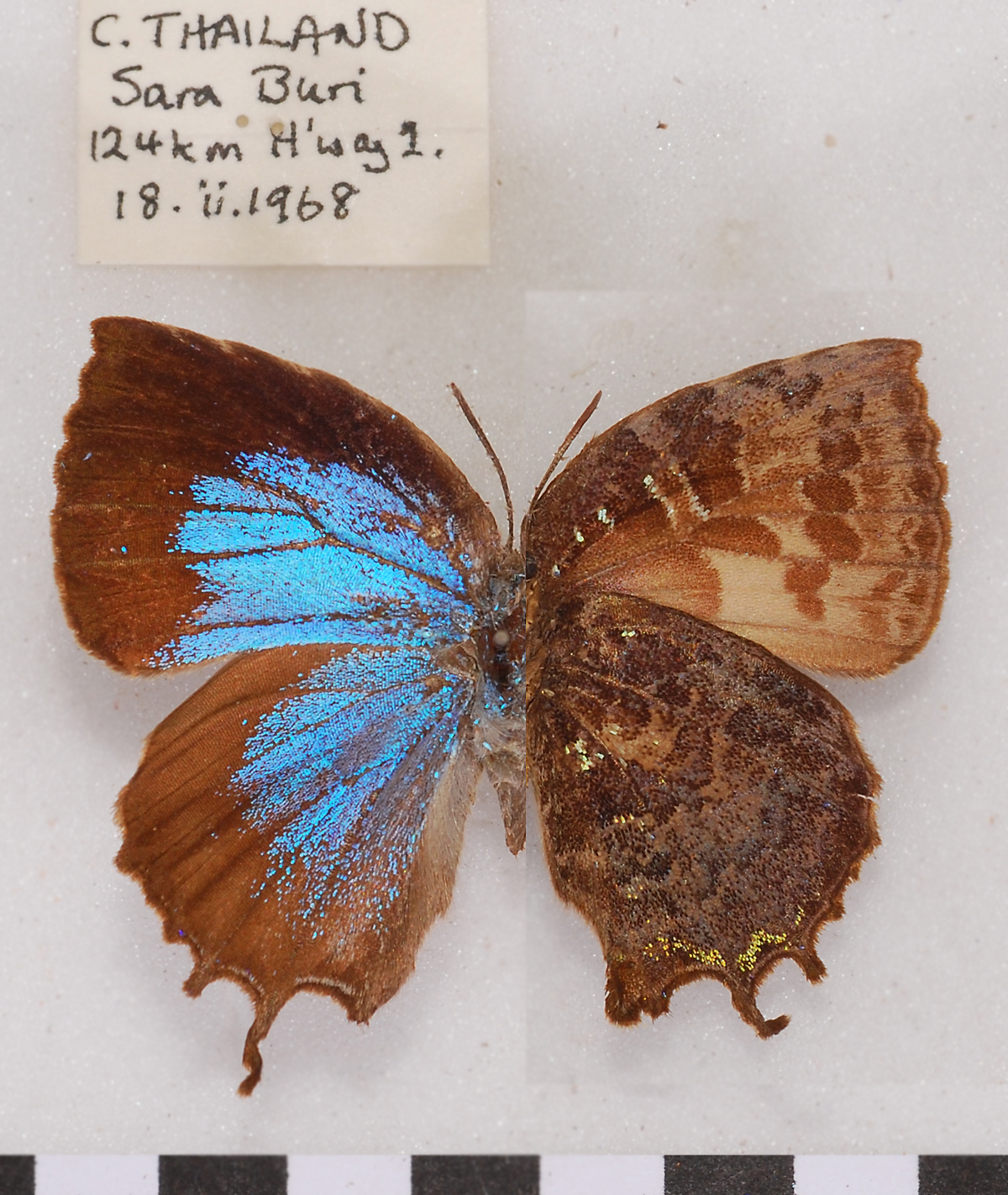
Museum specimen

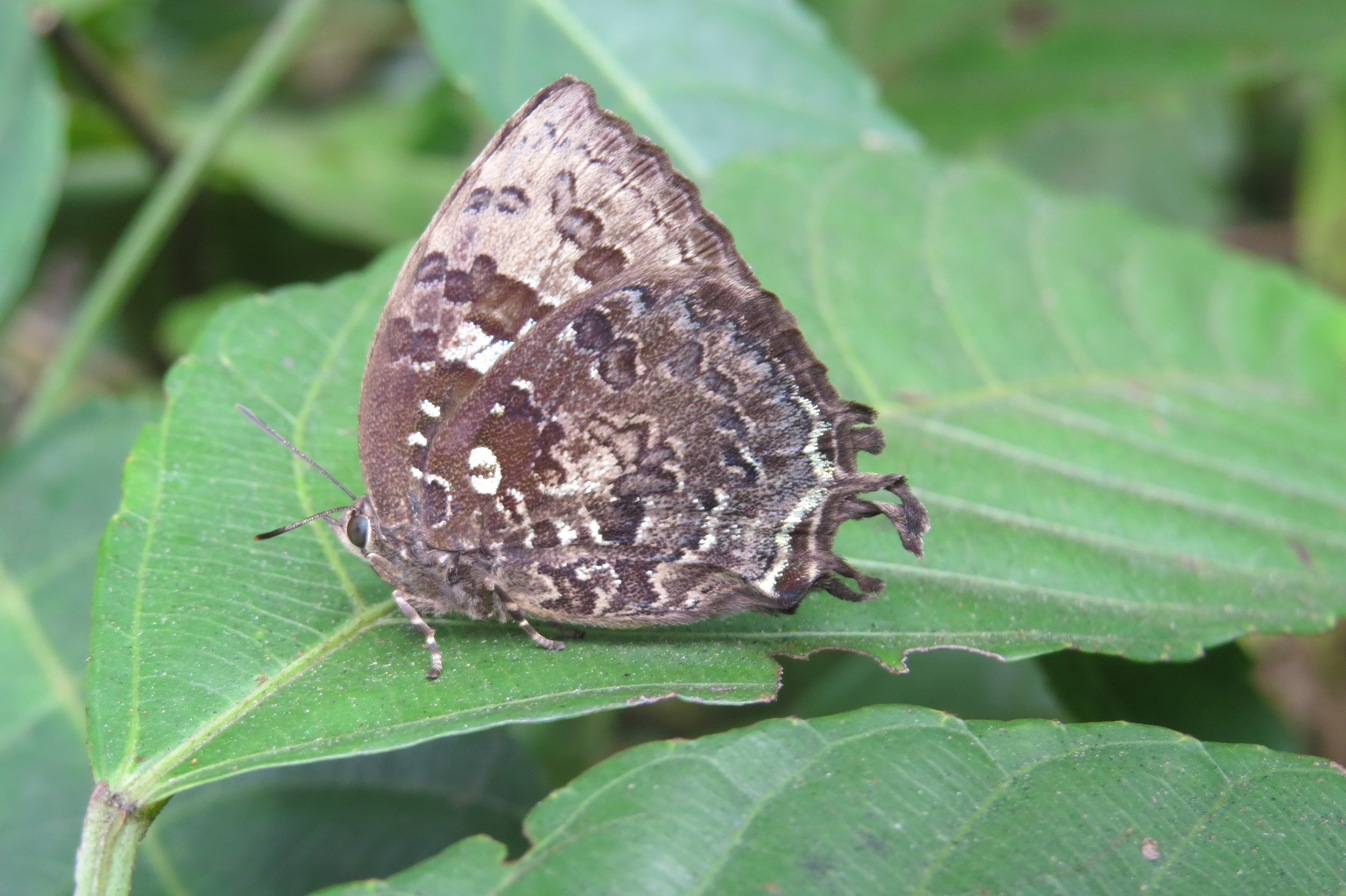
Ventral view

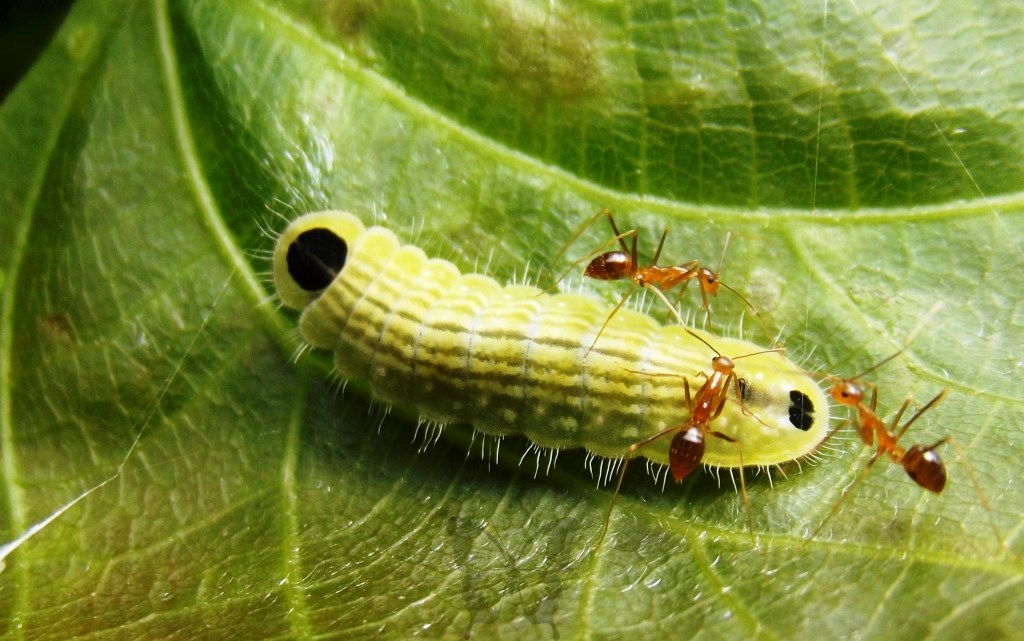
Larva

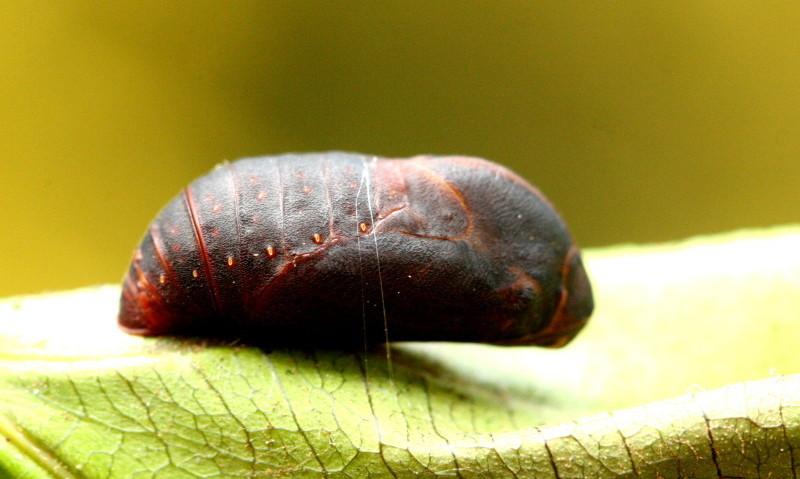
Pupa

==== Genus: Virachola ====
===== Virachola isocrates (common guava blue) =====
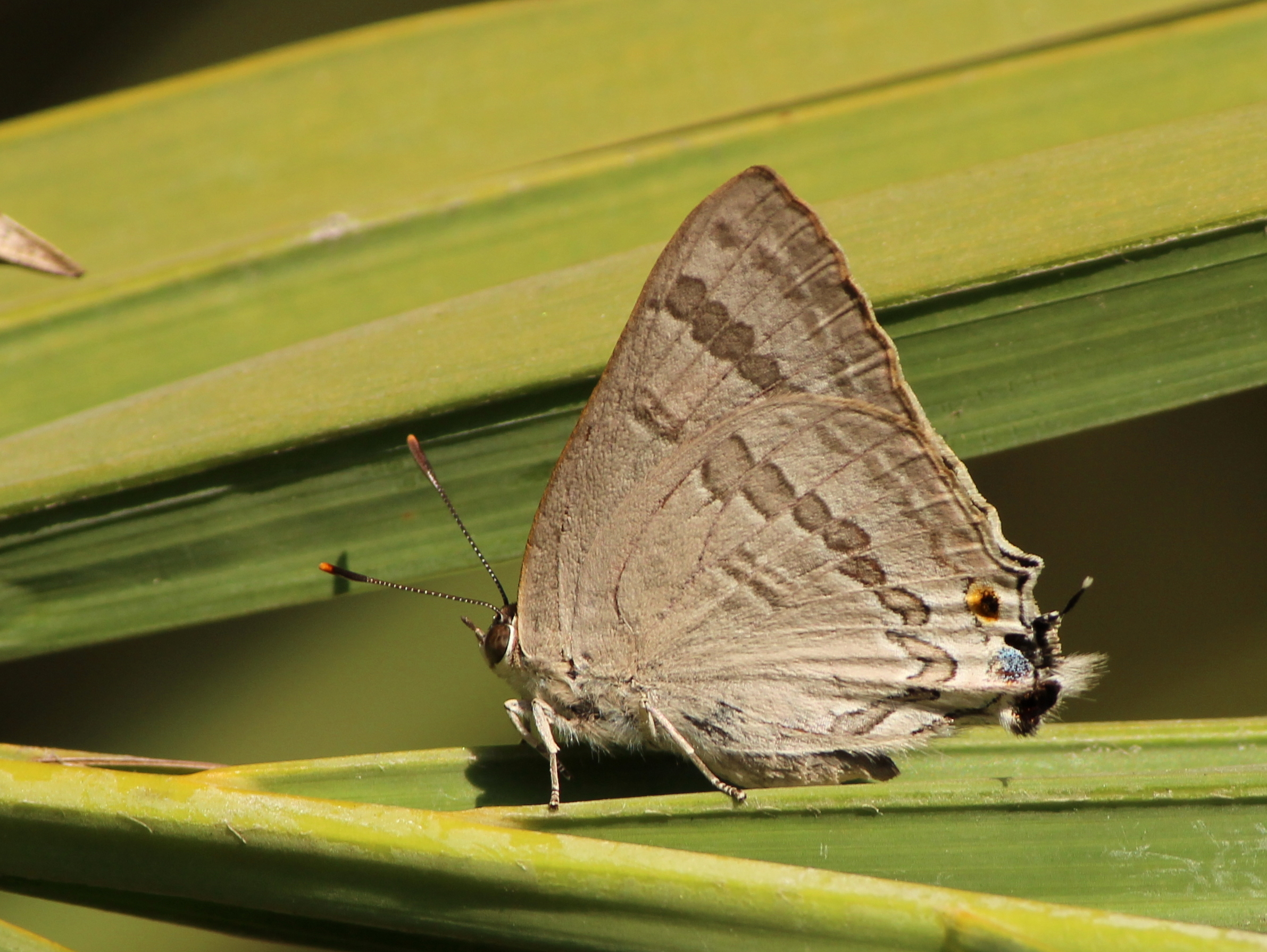
Ventral view

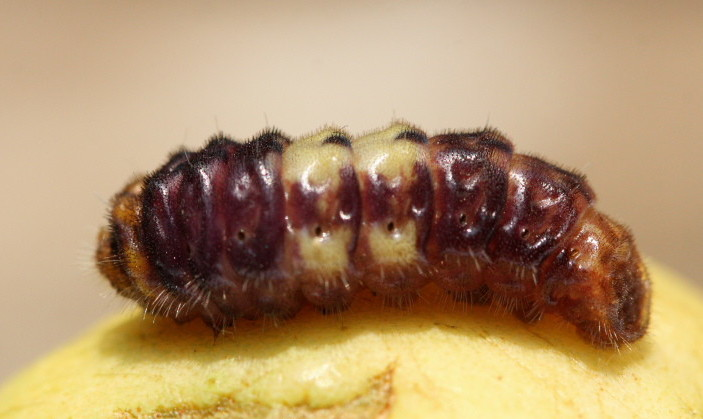
Larva

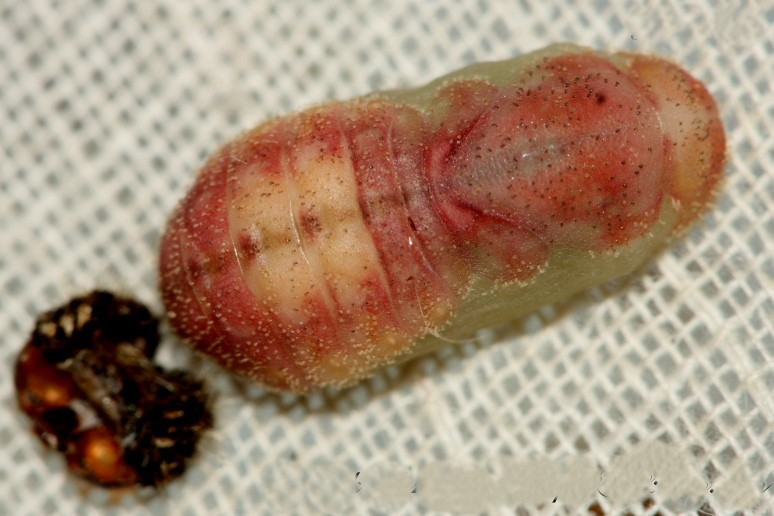
Pupa

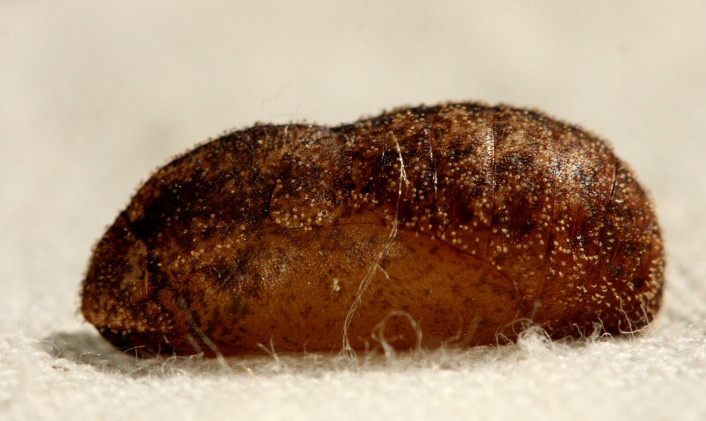
Pupa

===== Virachola perse (large guava blue) =====
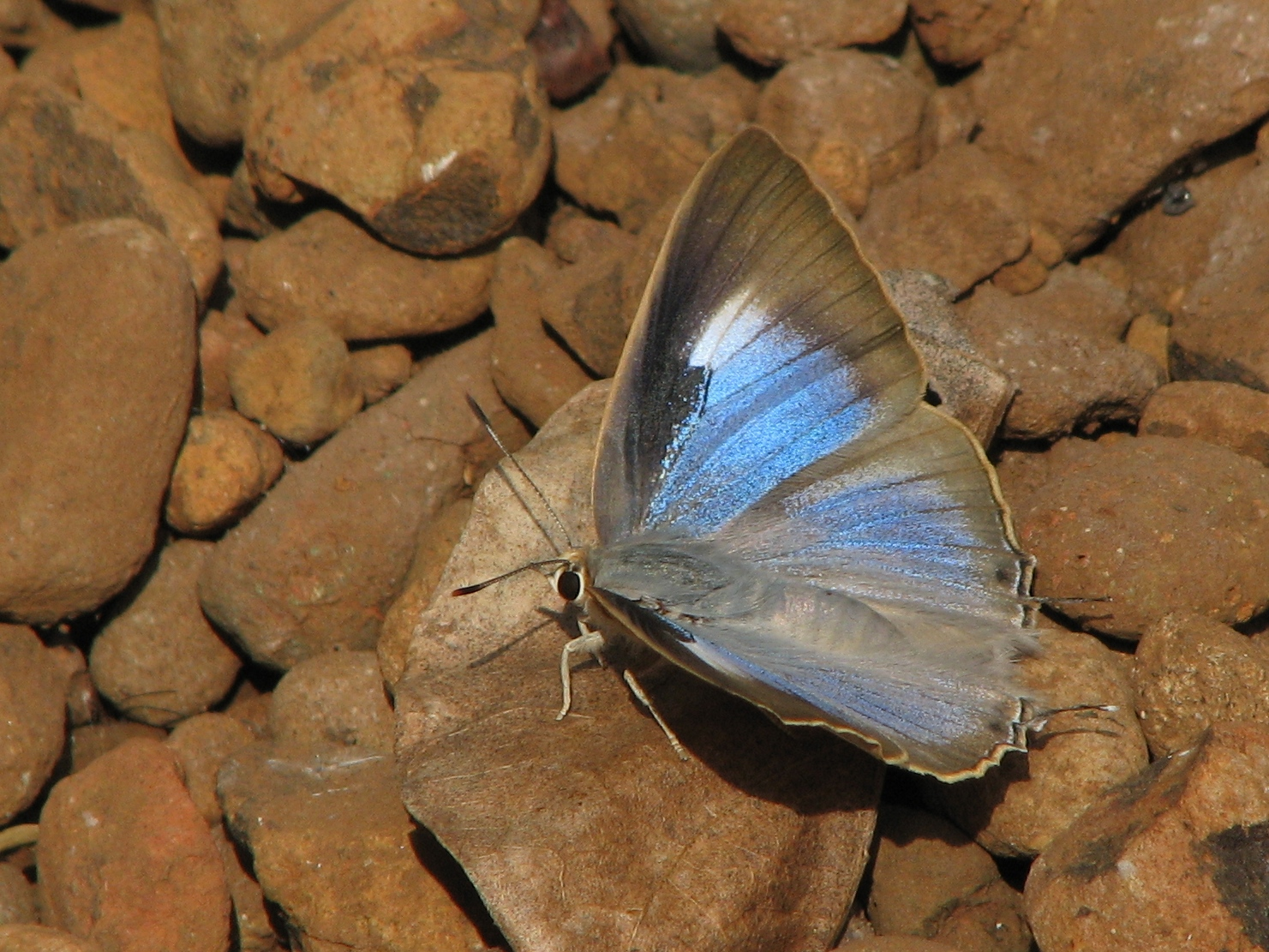
Dorsal view

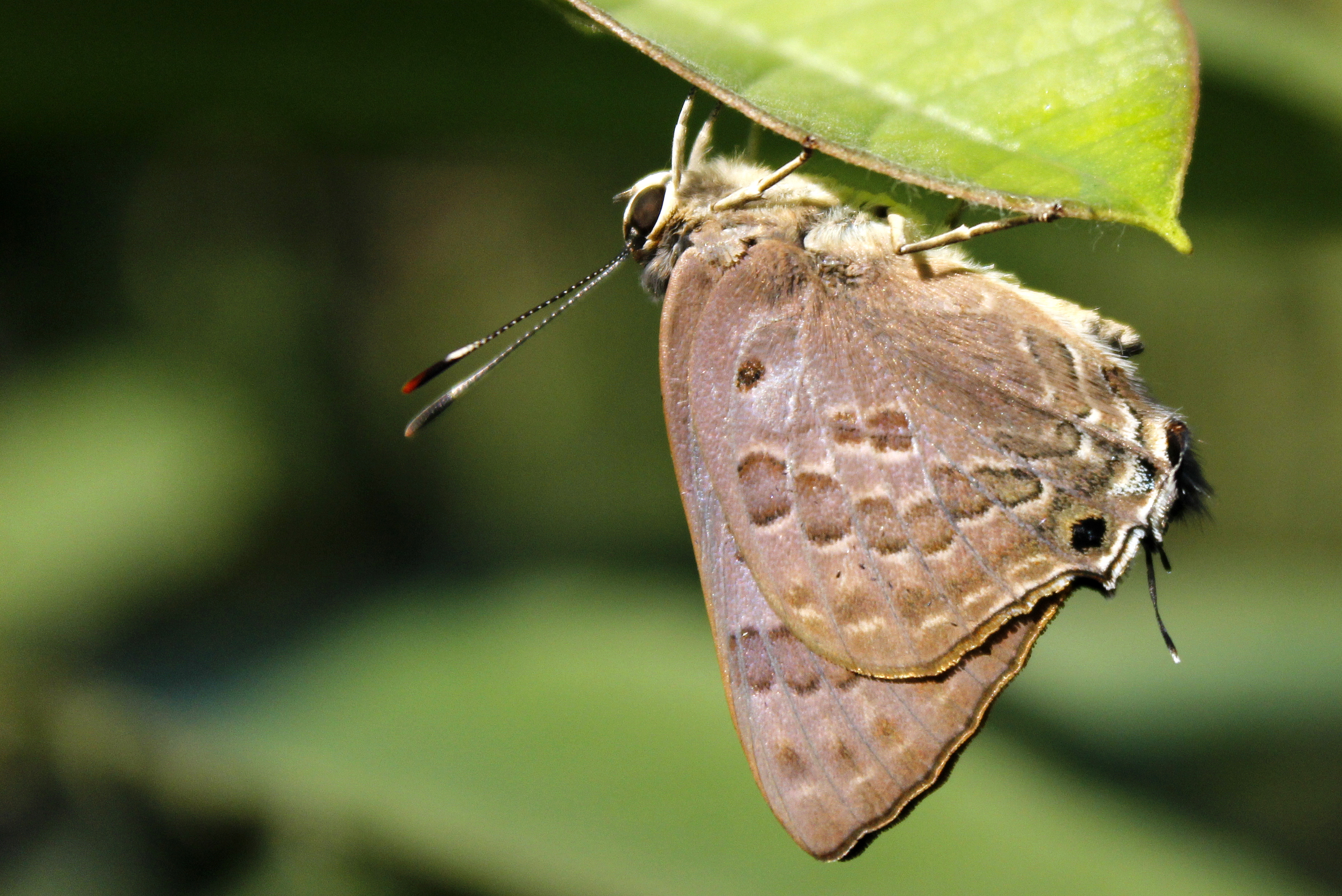
Ventral view

==== Genus: Zeltus ====
===== Zeltus amasa (fluffy tit) =====
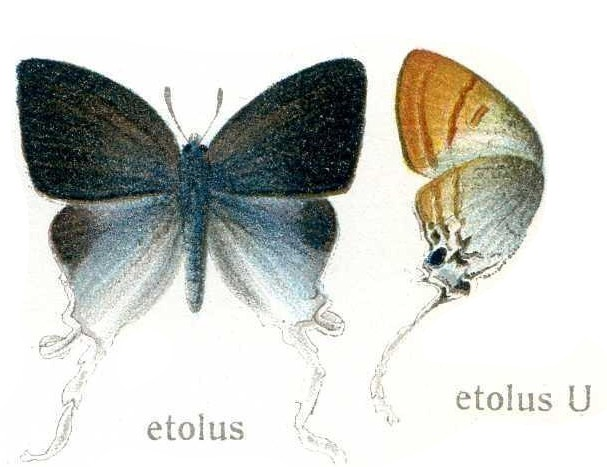
Illustration

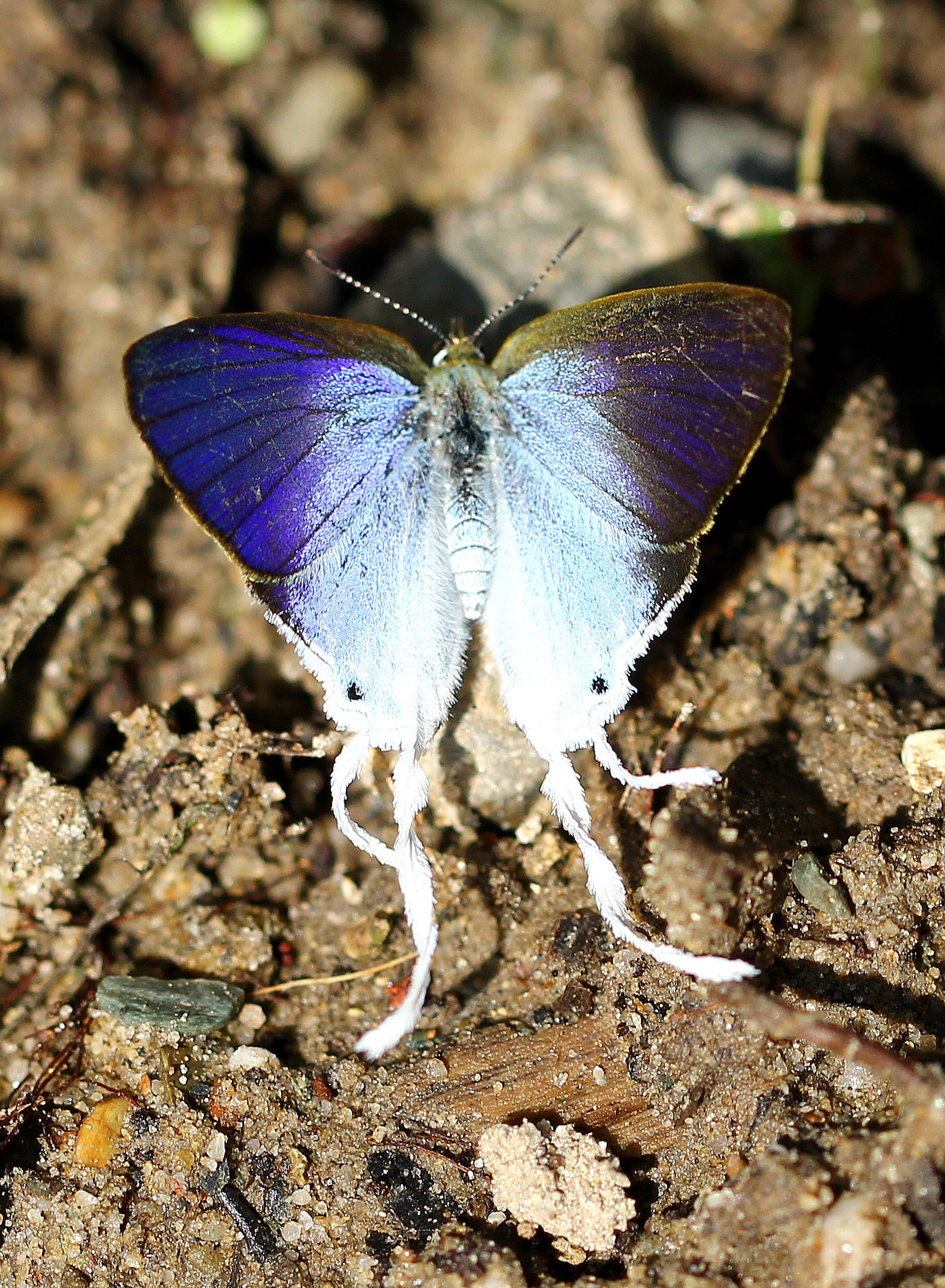
Dorsal view

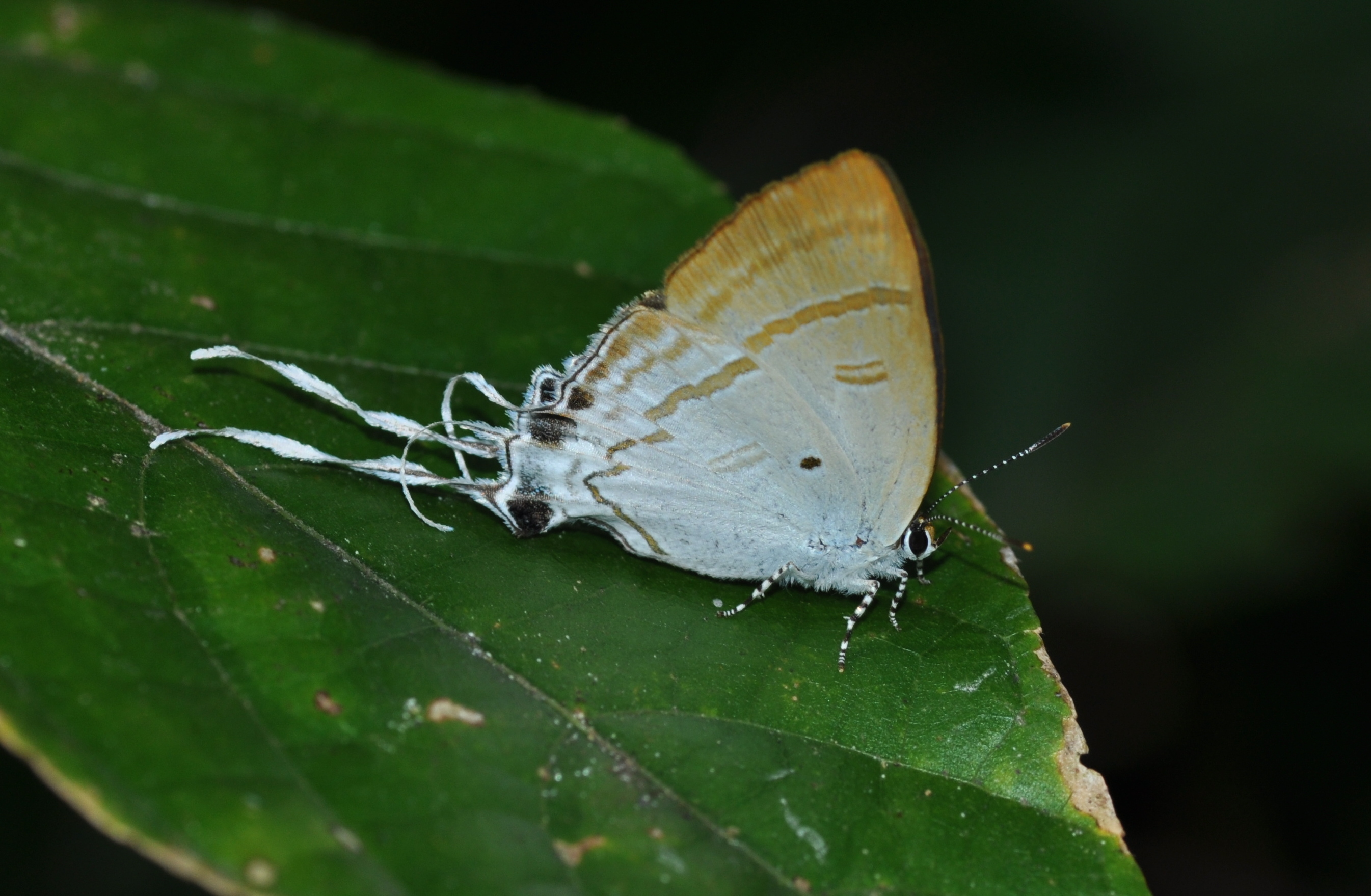
Ventral view

==== Genus: Zesius ====
===== Zesius chrysomallus (redspot) =====
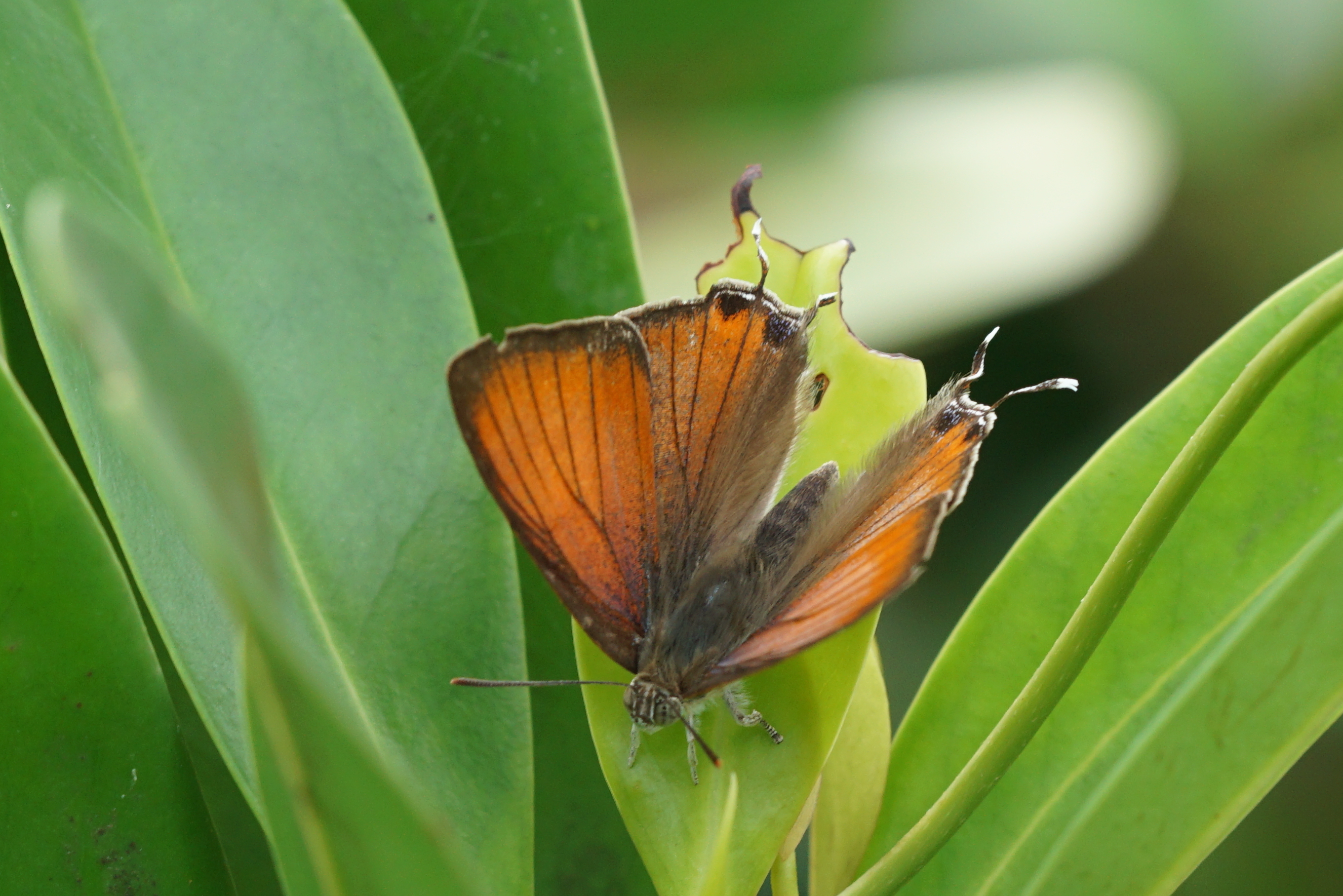
Dorsal view (male)

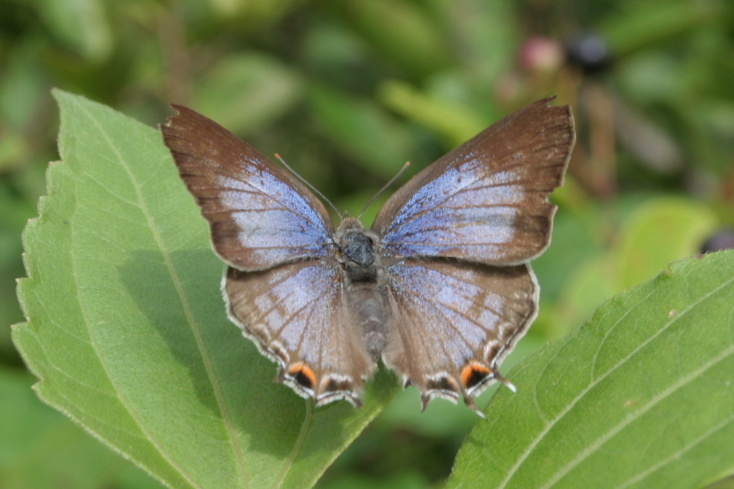
Dorsal view (female)

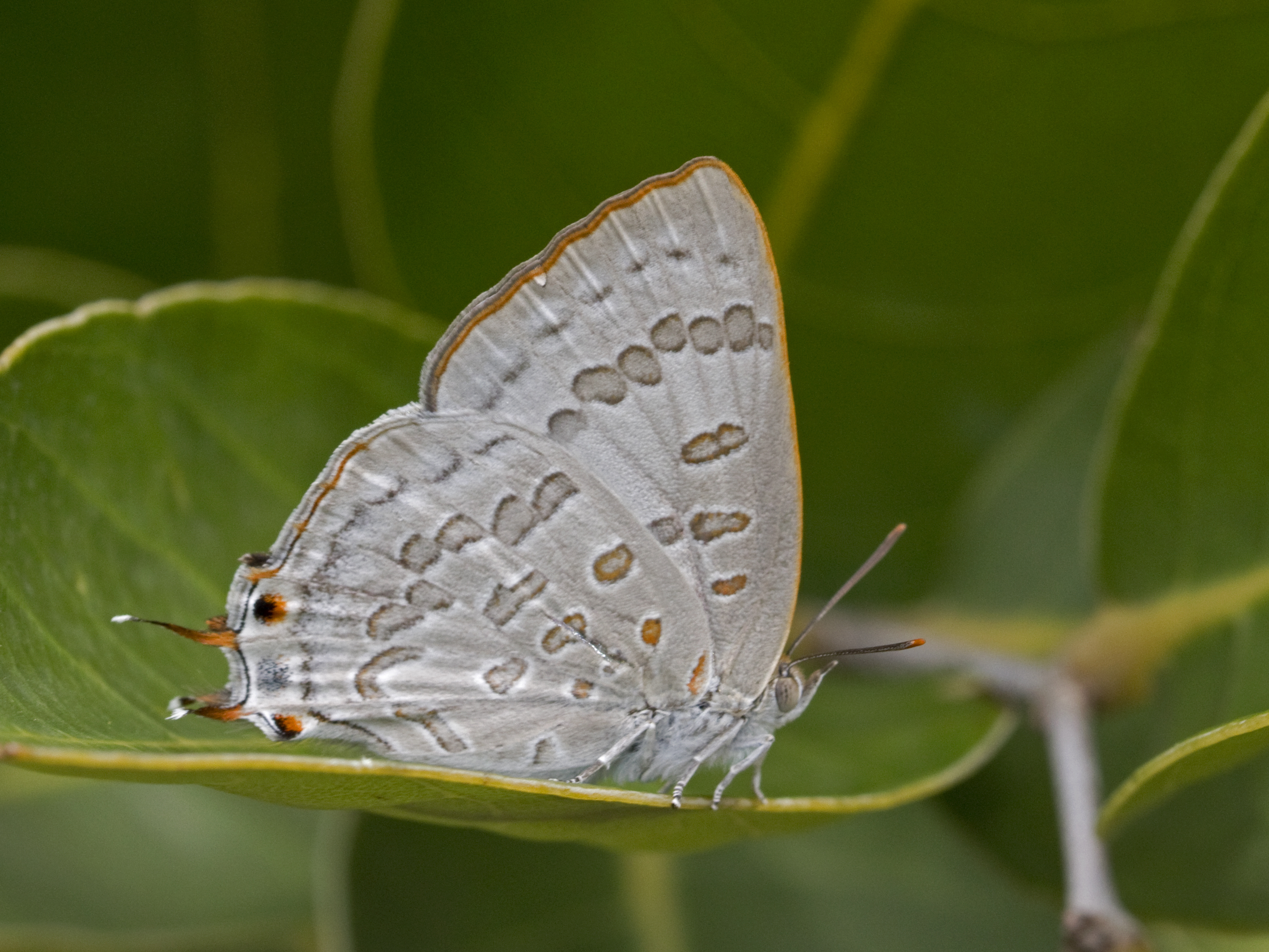
Ventral view

==== Genus: Zinaspa ====
===== Zinaspa todara (silver streaked acacia blue) =====
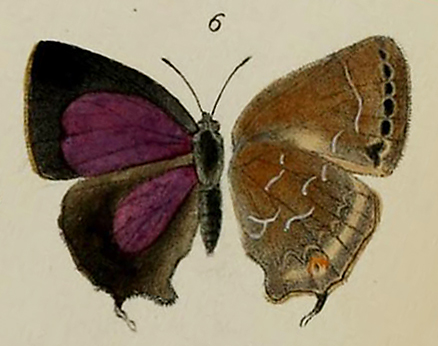
Museum specimen

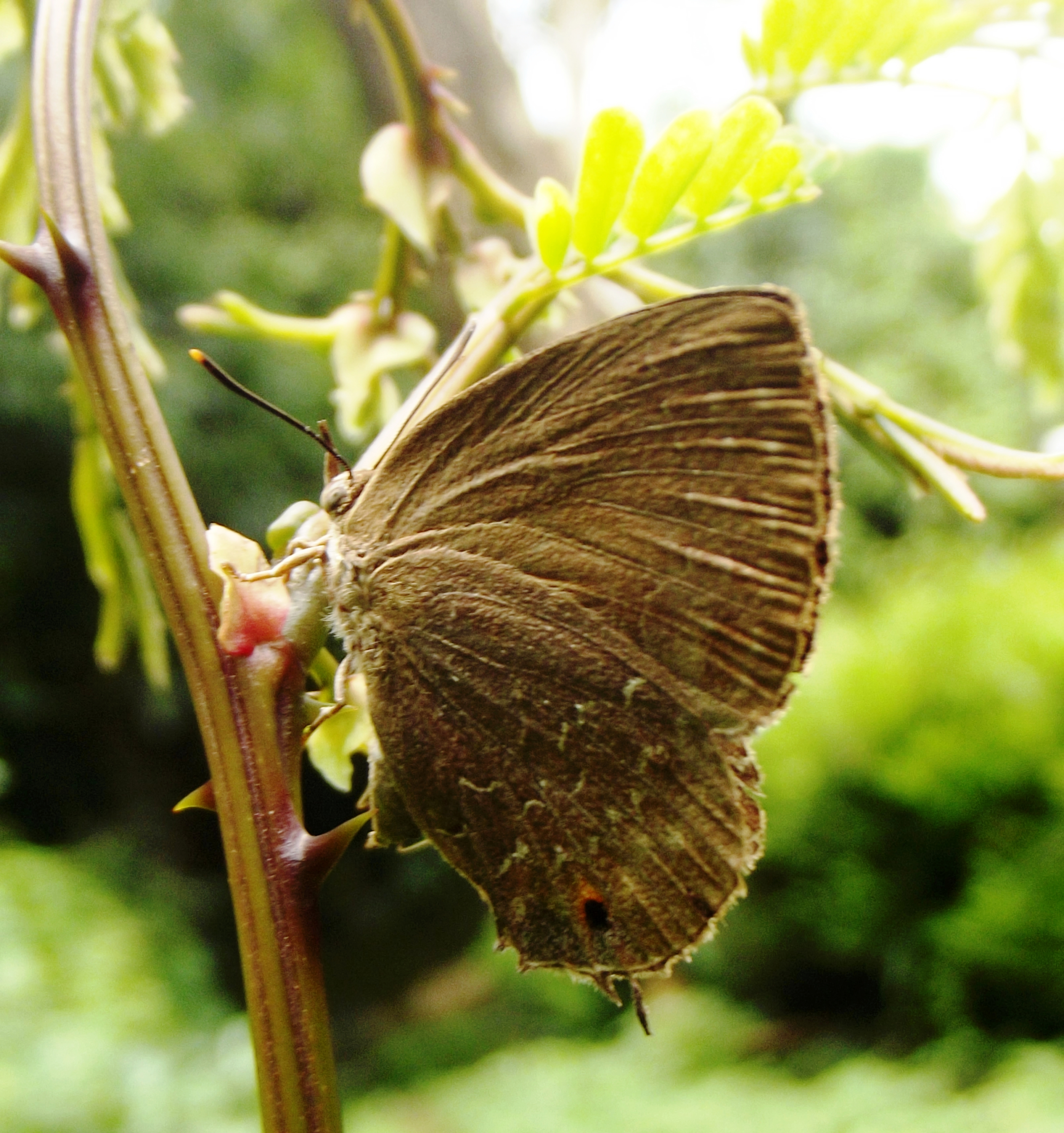
Ventral view

=== Subfamily: Aphnaeinae ===
==== Genus: Cigaritis ====
===== Cigaritis abnormis (abnormal silverline) =====
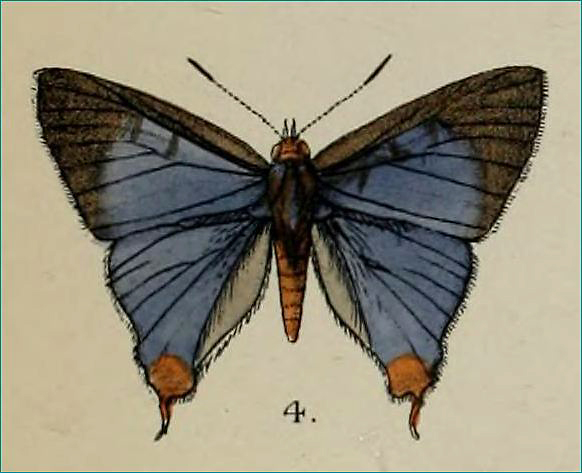
Illustration

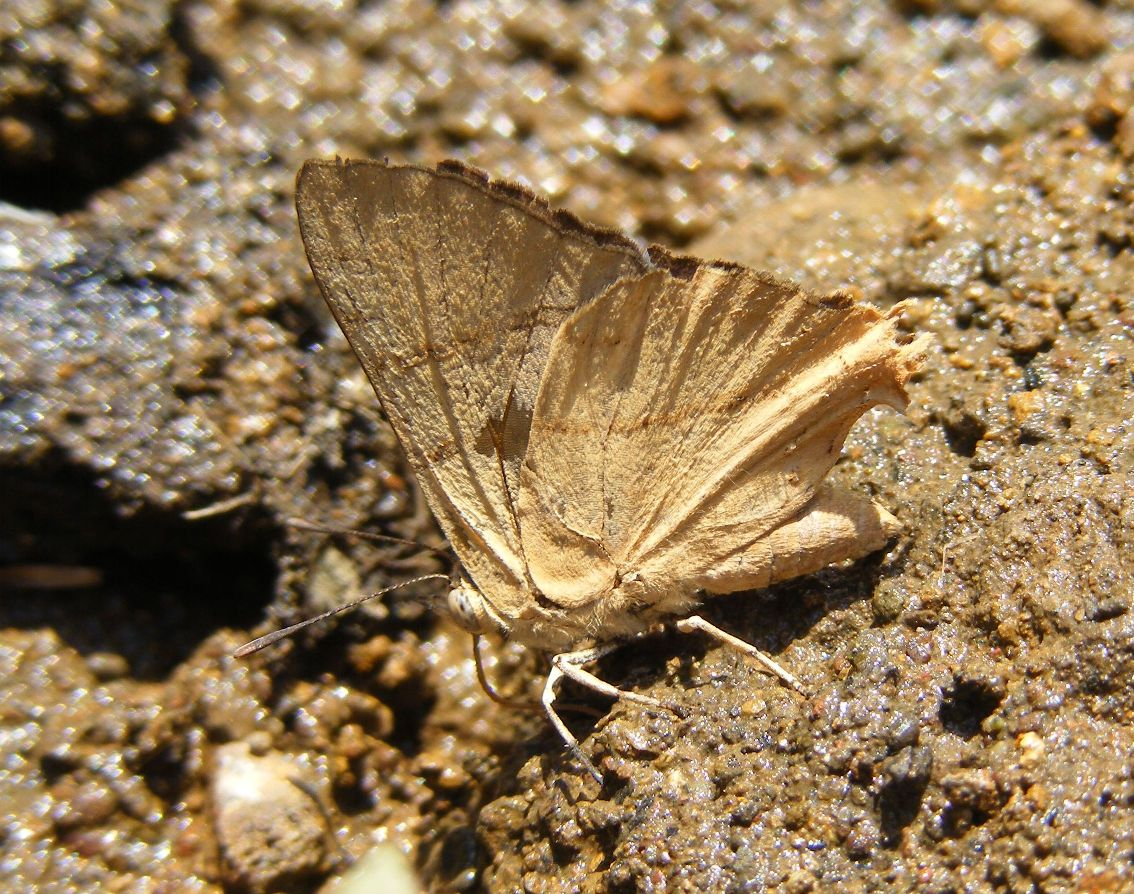
Ventral view

===== Cigaritis elima (scarce shot silverline) =====
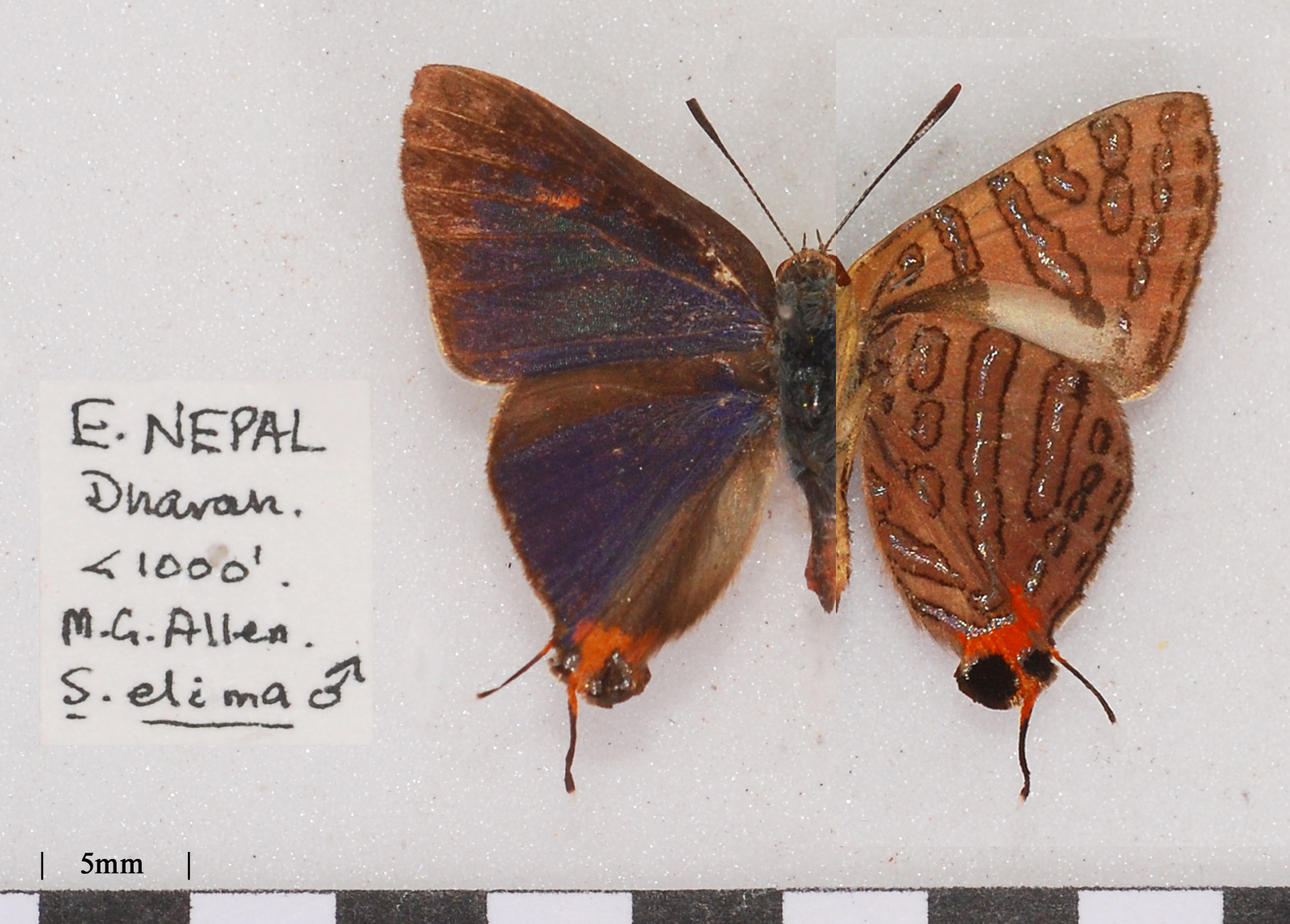
Museum specimen

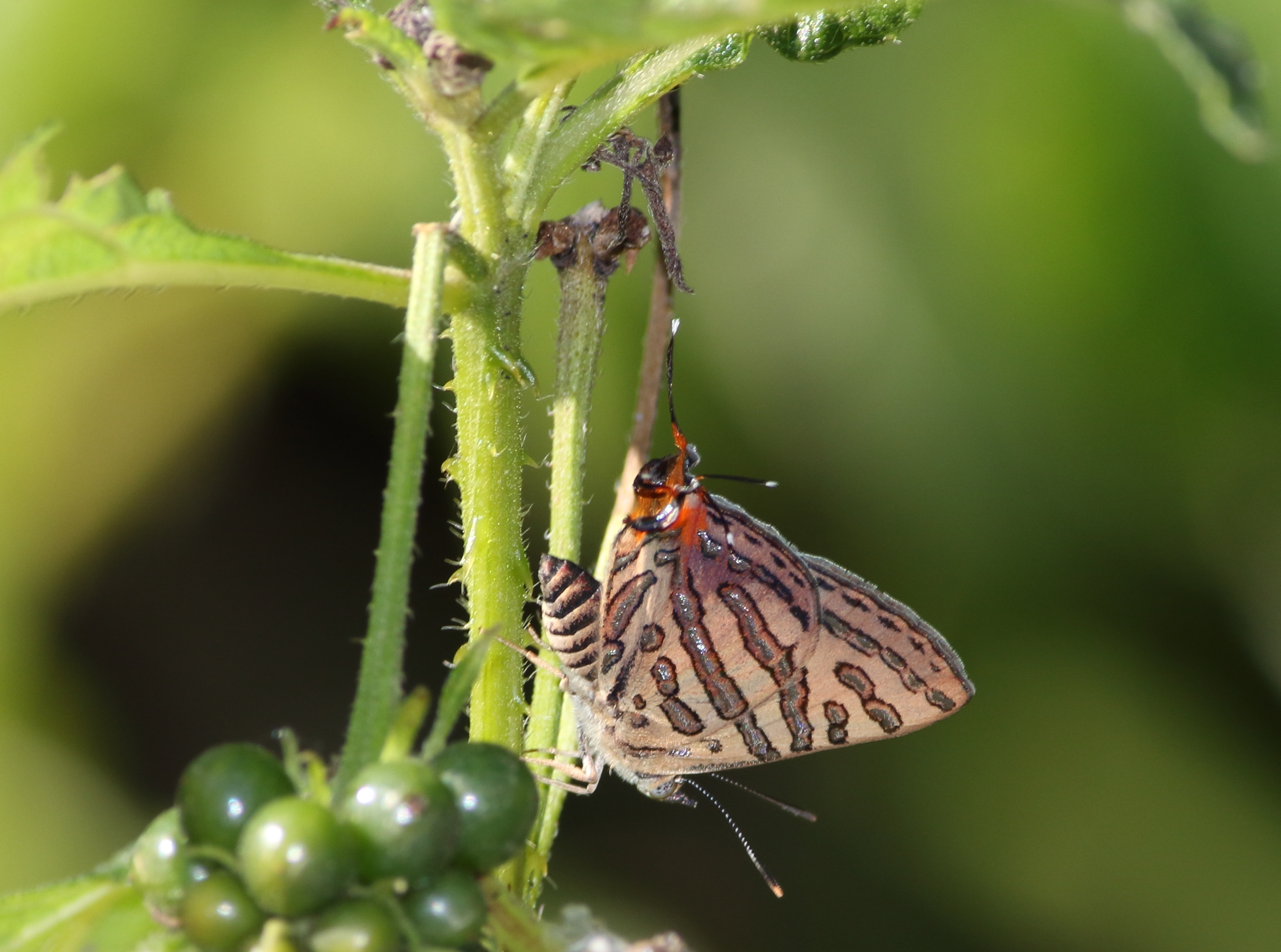
Ventral view

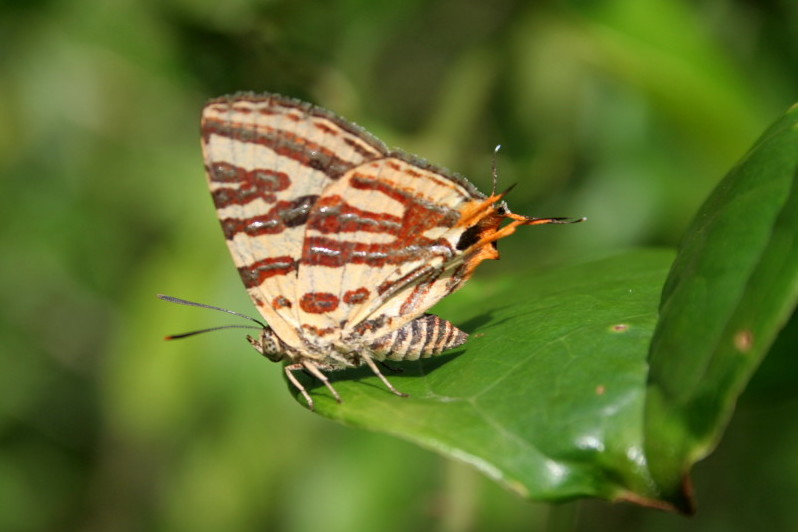
Ventral view

===== Cigaritis ictis (common shot silverline) =====
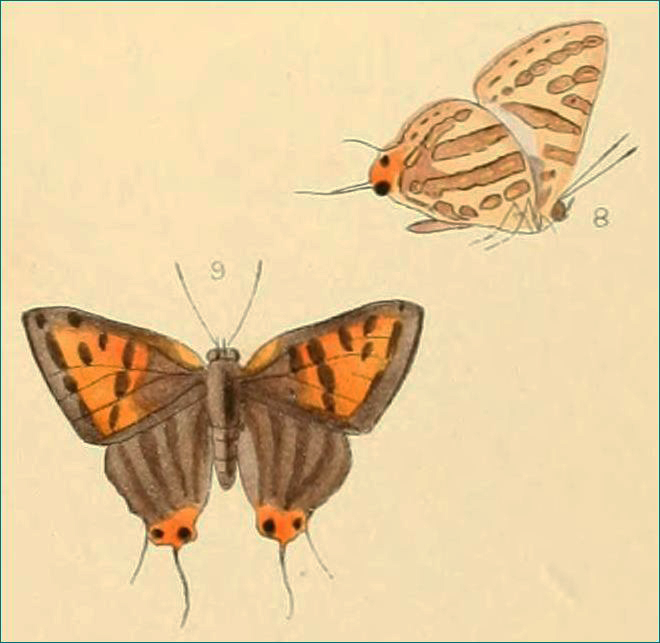
Illustration

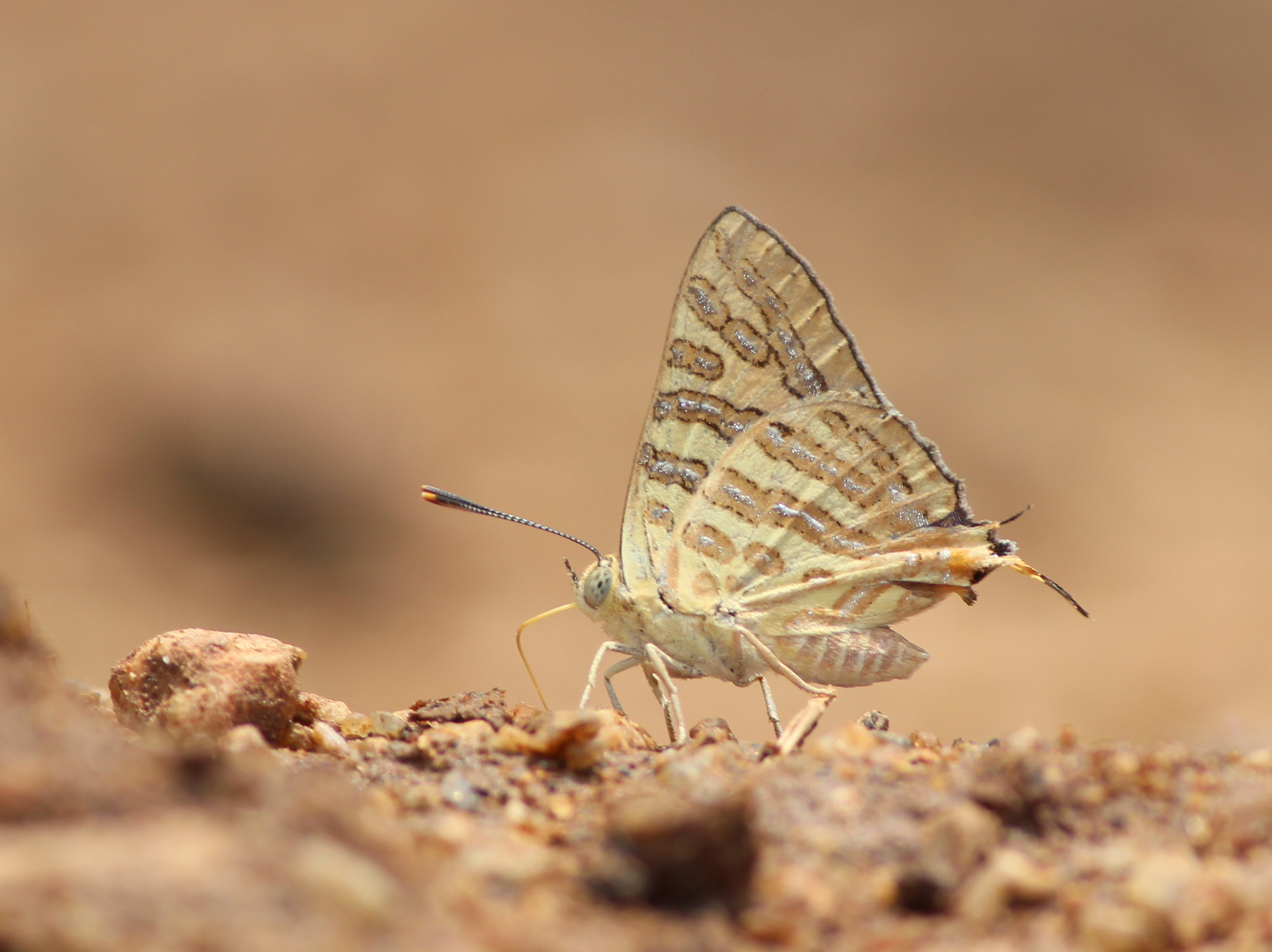
Ventral view

===== Cigaritis lilacinus (lilac silverline) =====
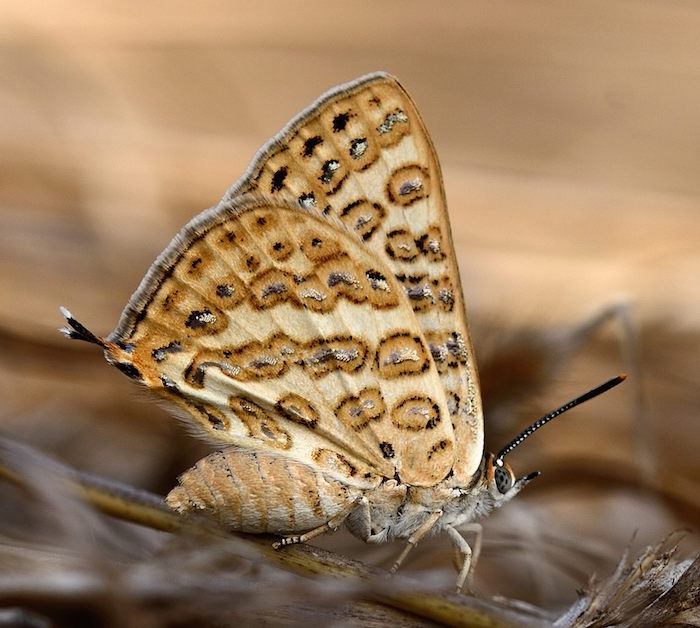
Ventral view

===== Cigaritis lohita (long banded silverline) =====
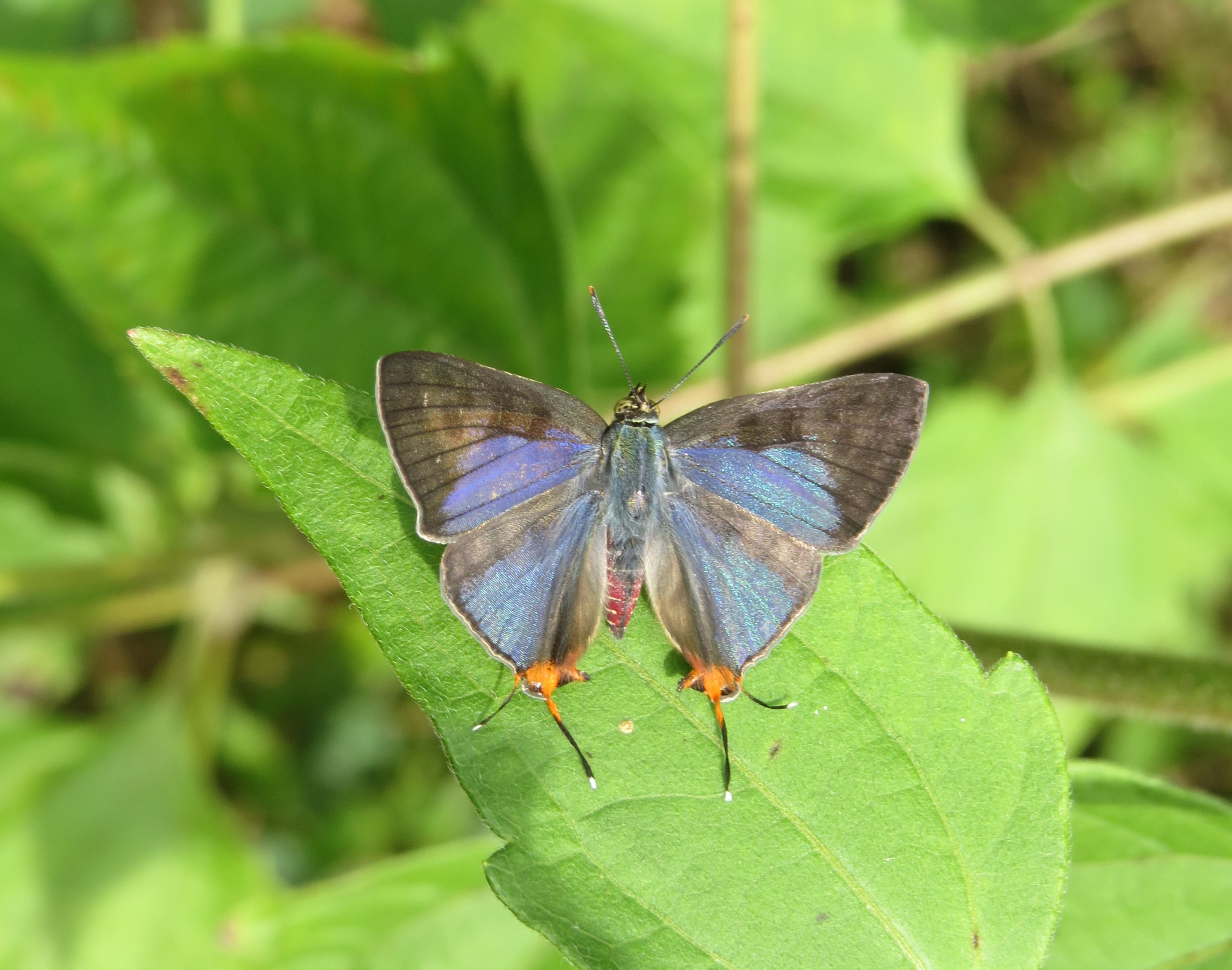
Dorsal view

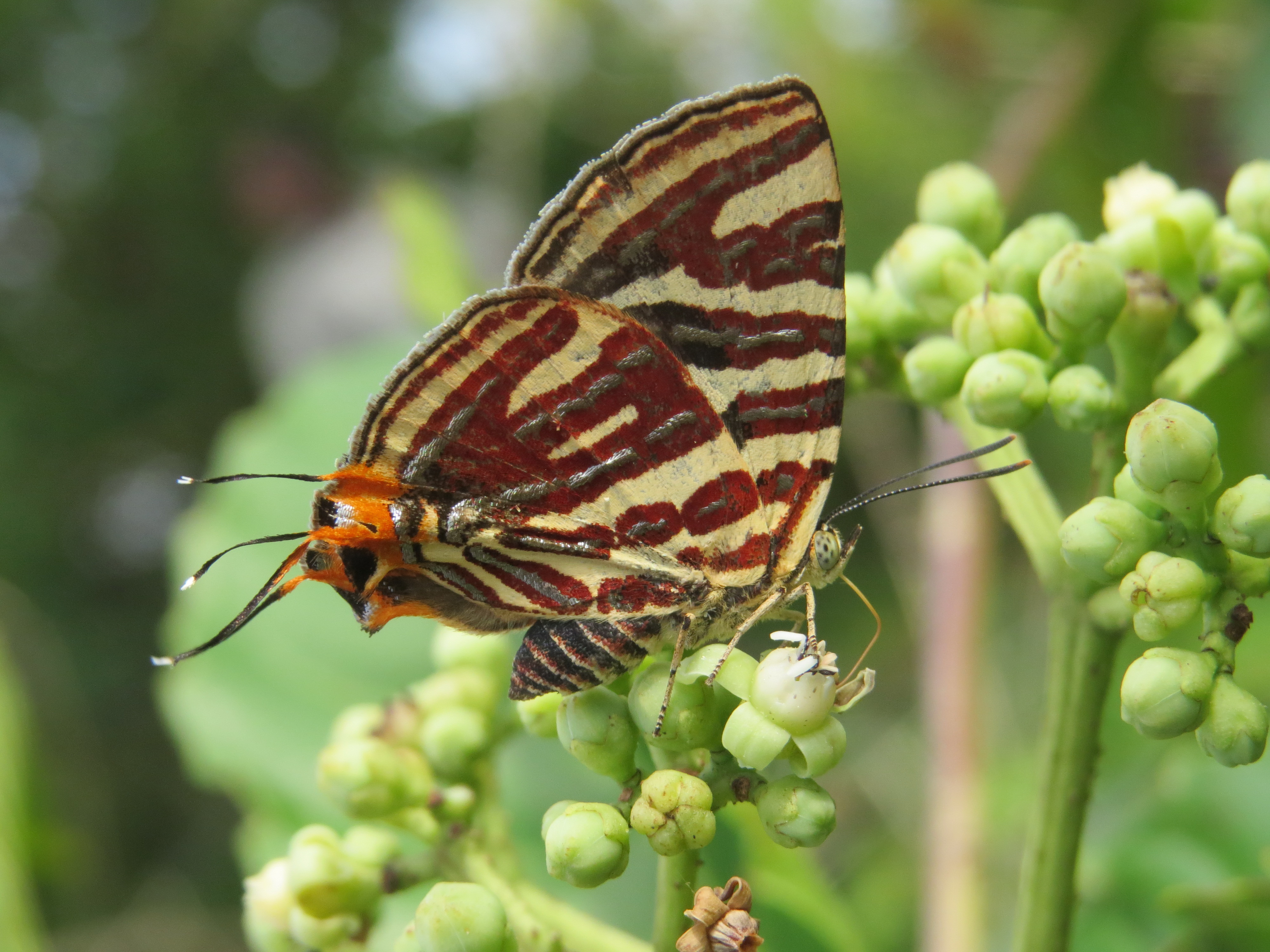
Ventral view (wet-season form)

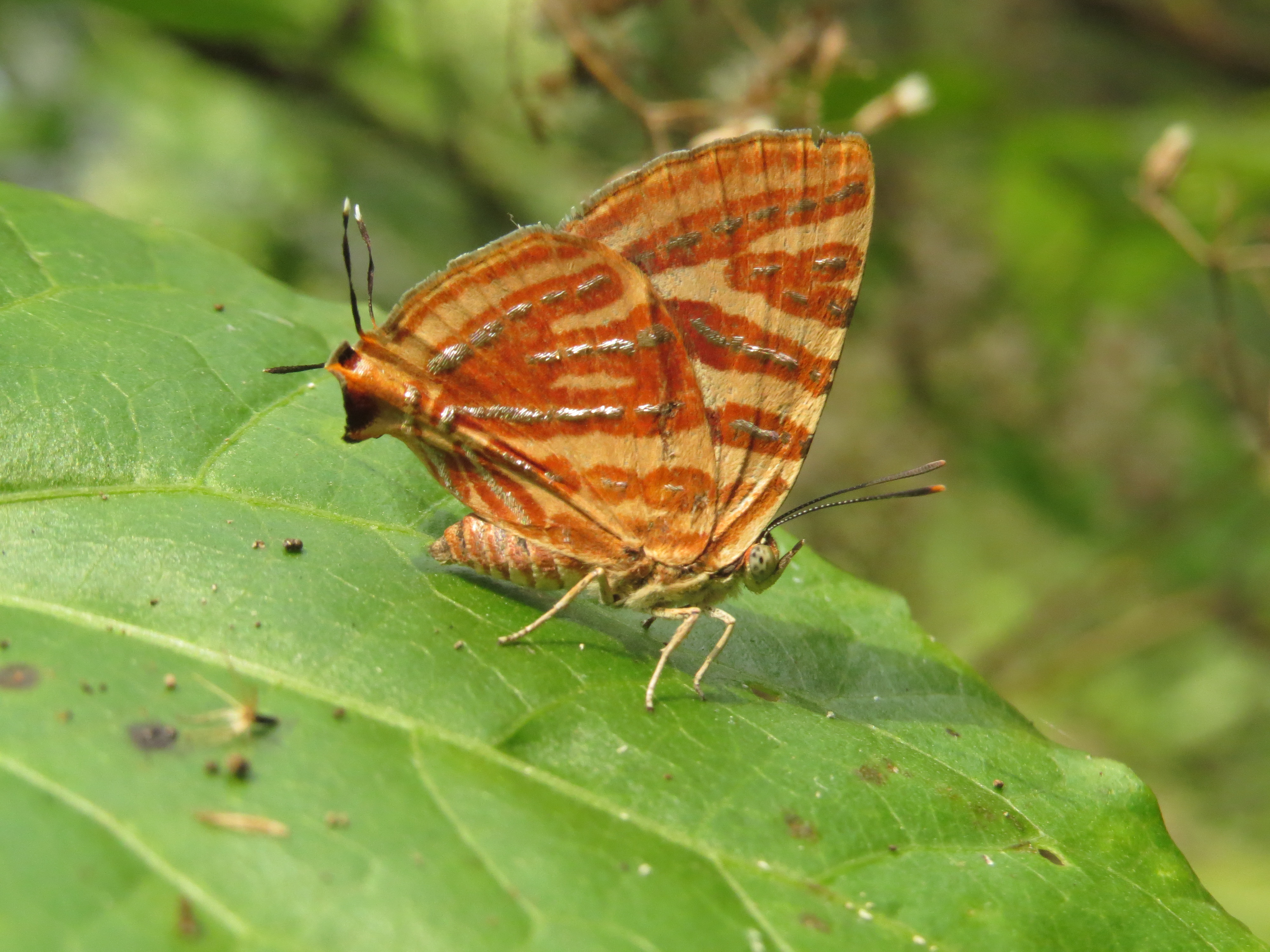
Ventral view (dry-season form)

===== Cigaritis schistacea (plumbeous silverline) =====
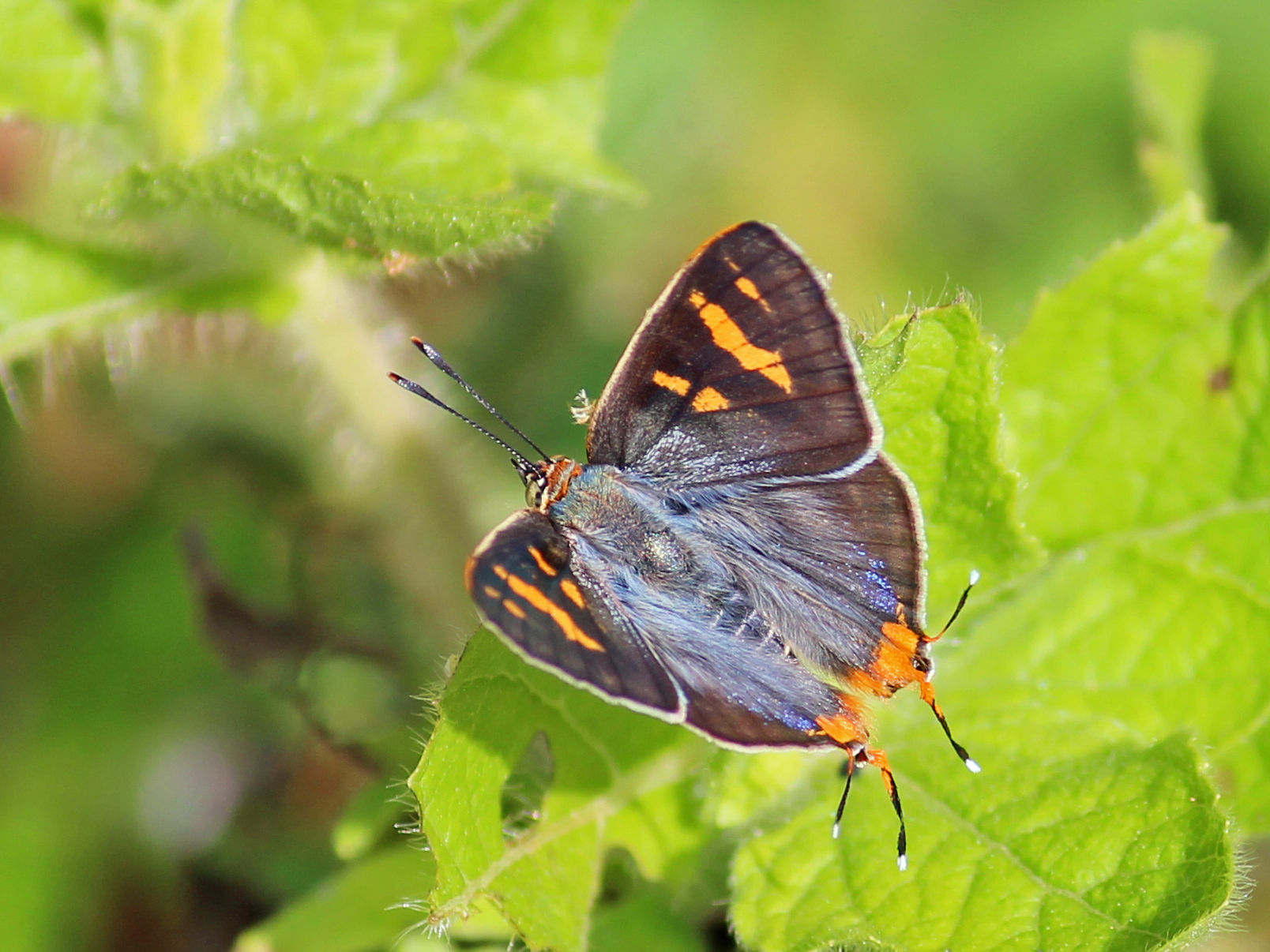
Dorsal view

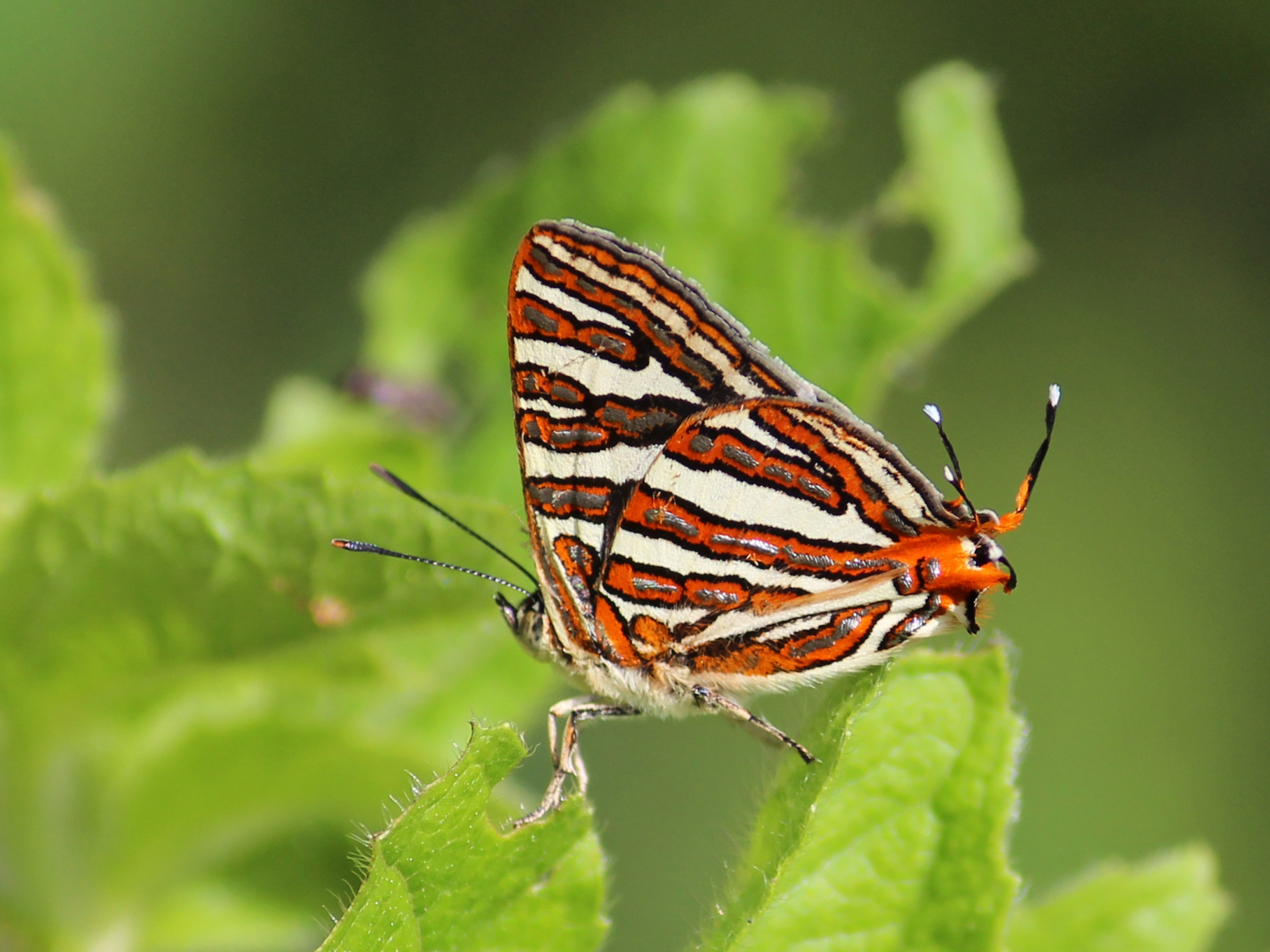
Ventral view

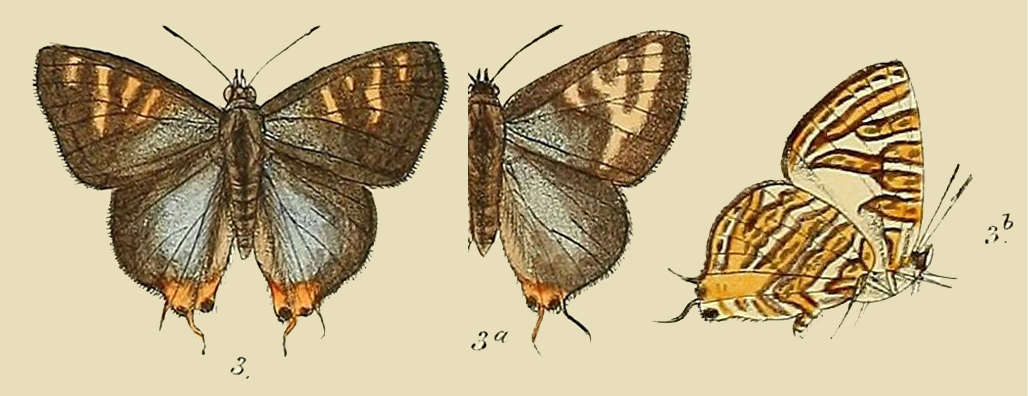
Illustration

===== Cigaritis vulcanus (common silverline) =====
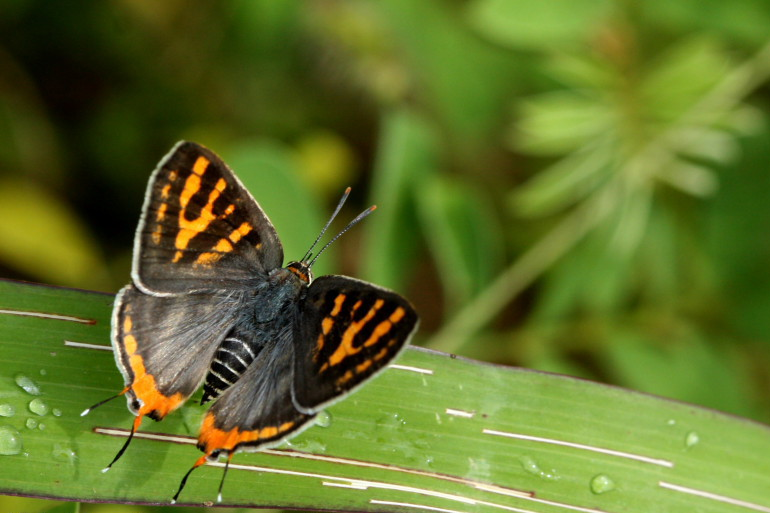
Dorsal view

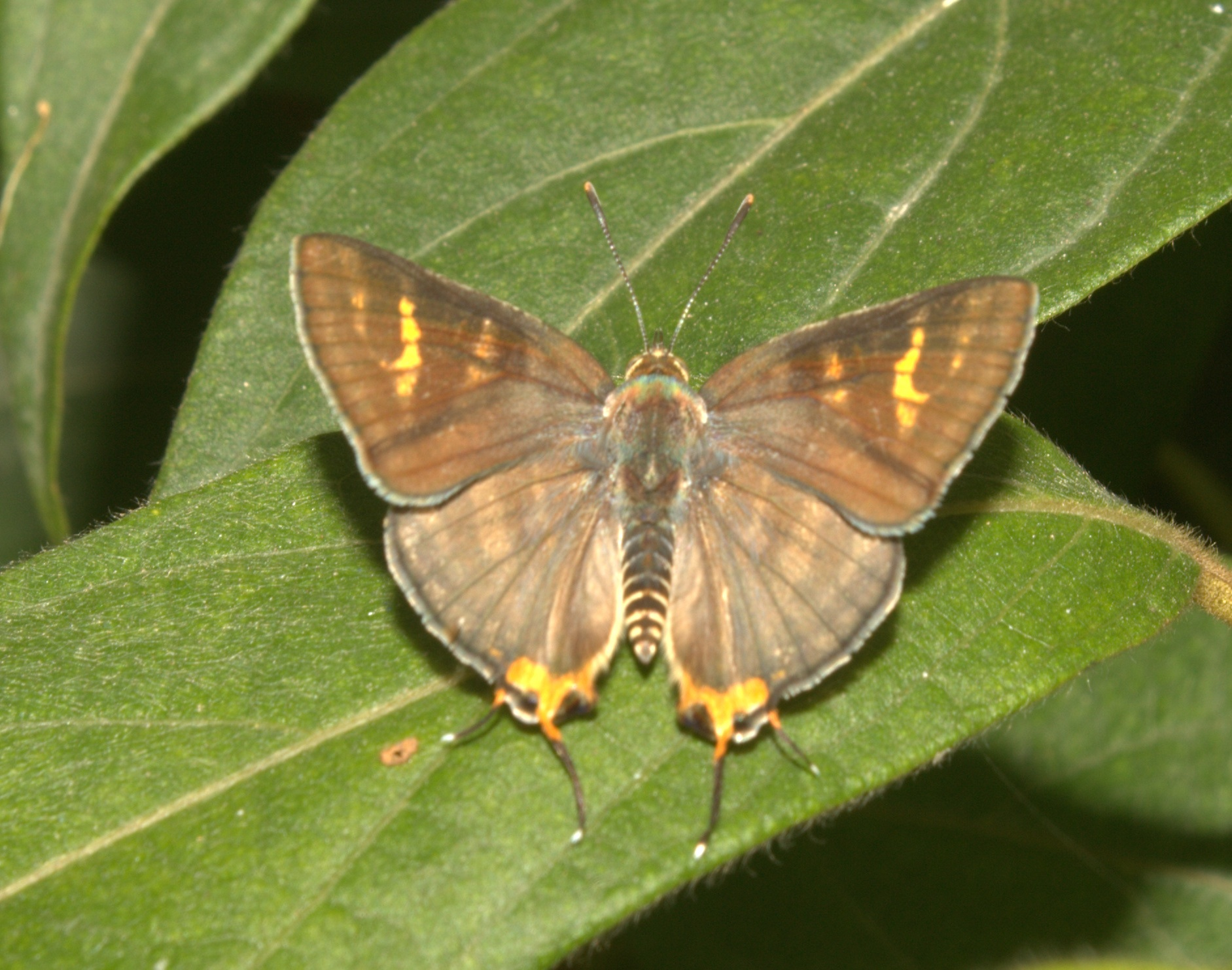
Dorsal view

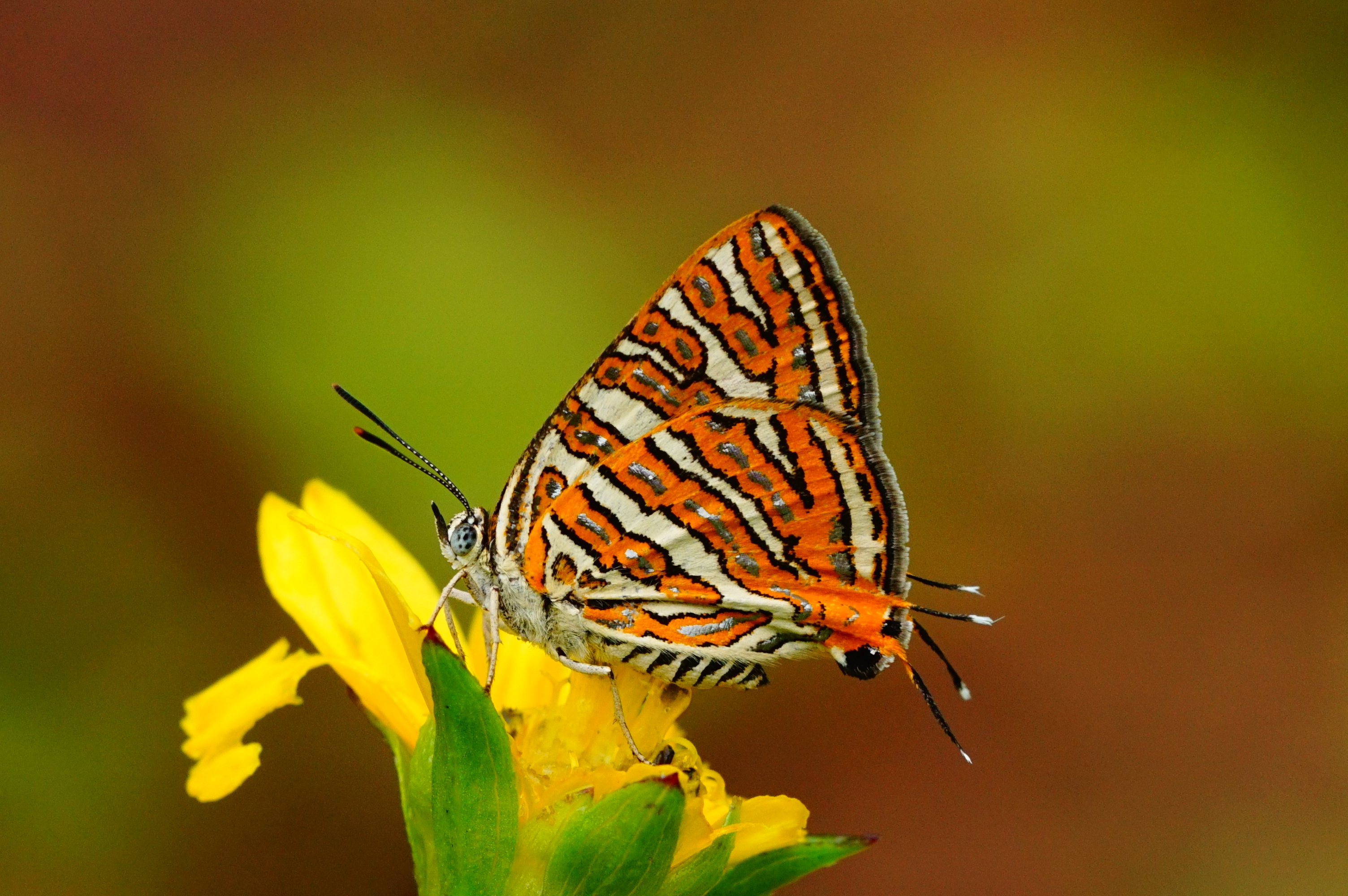
Ventral view

== Family: Hesperiidae ==
=== Subfamily: Coeliadinae ===
==== Genus: Badamia ====
===== Badamia exclamationis (brown awl) =====
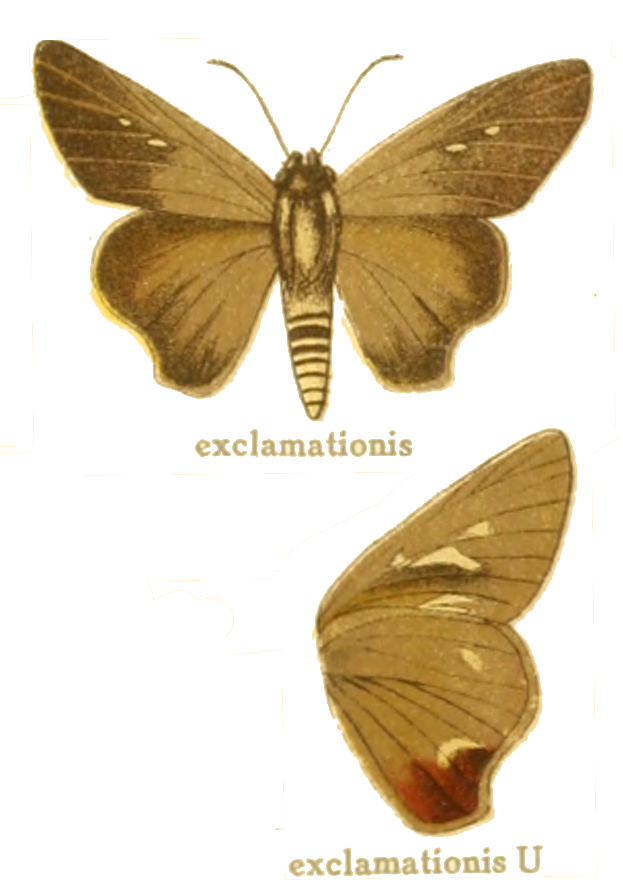
Illustration

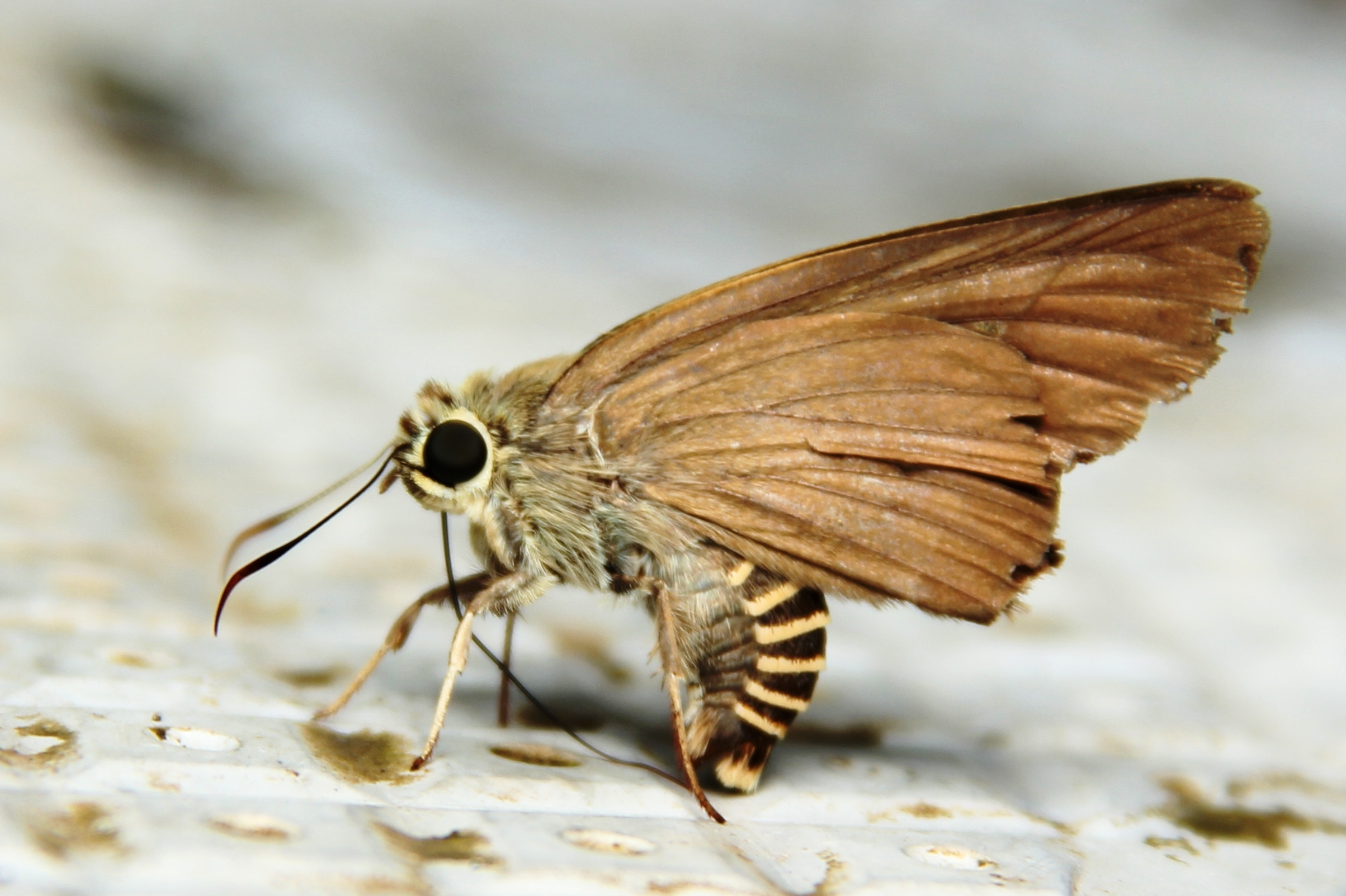
Ventral view

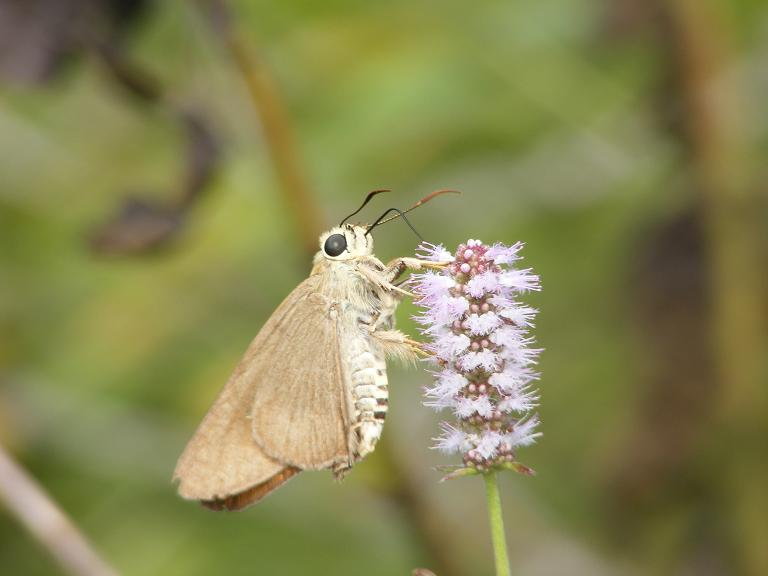
Ventral view

==== Genus: Bibasis ====
===== Bibasis sena (orange-tailed awlet) =====
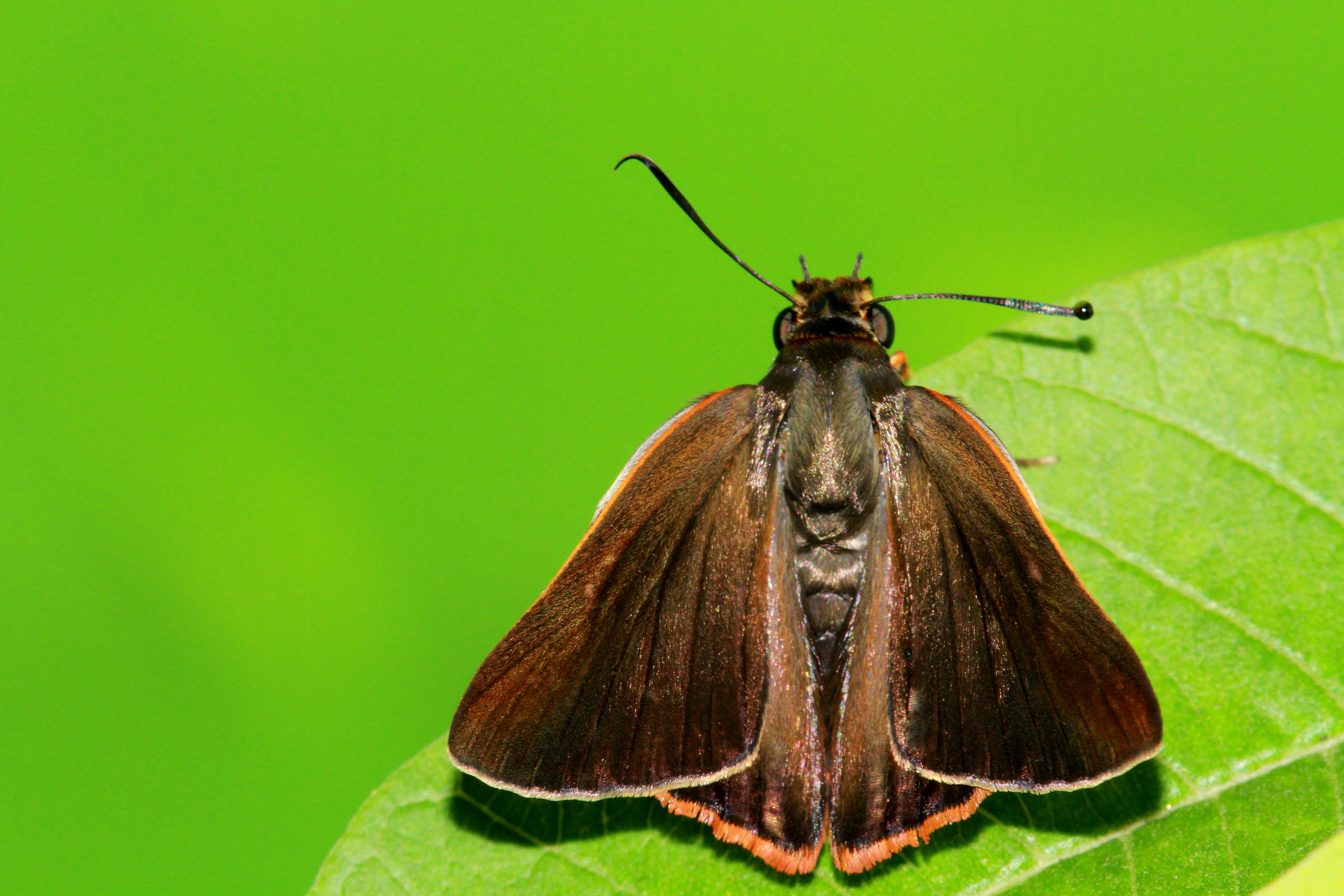
Dorsal view

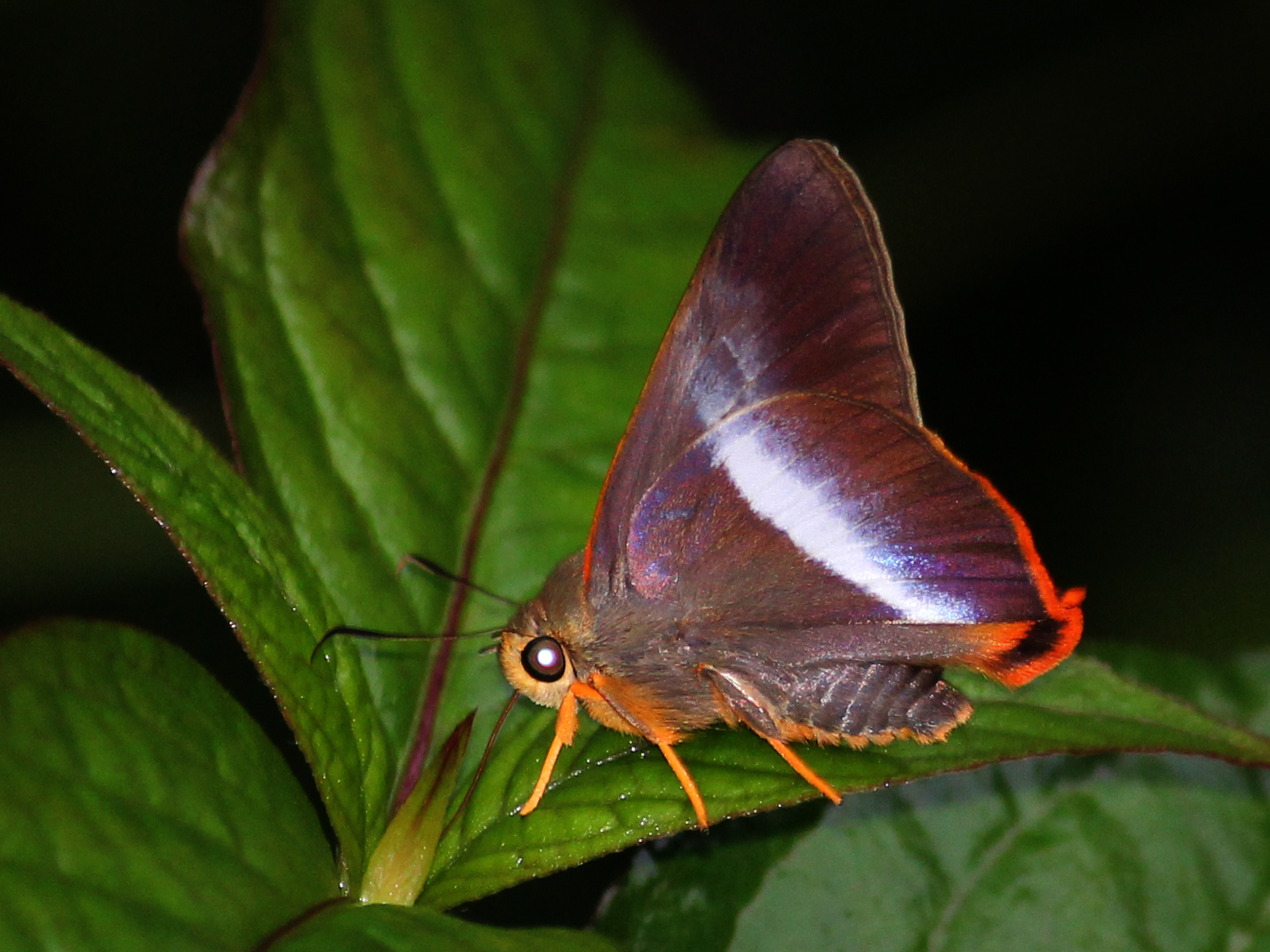
Ventral view

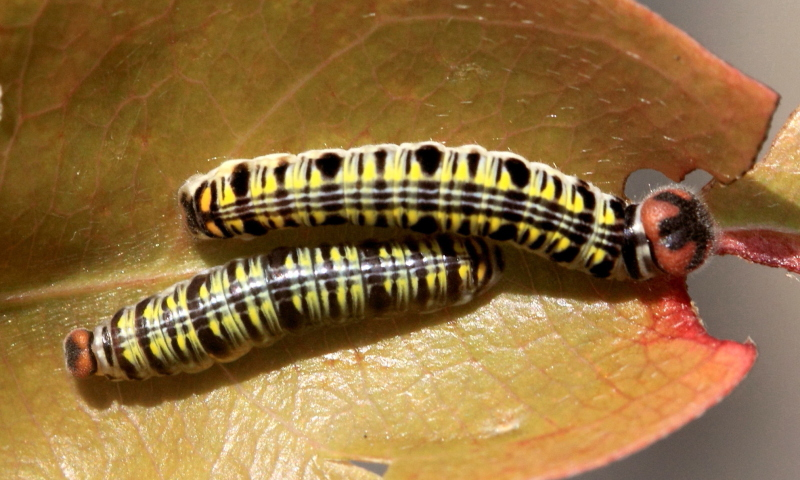
Larva

==== Genus: Burara ====
===== Burara gomata (pale green awlet) =====
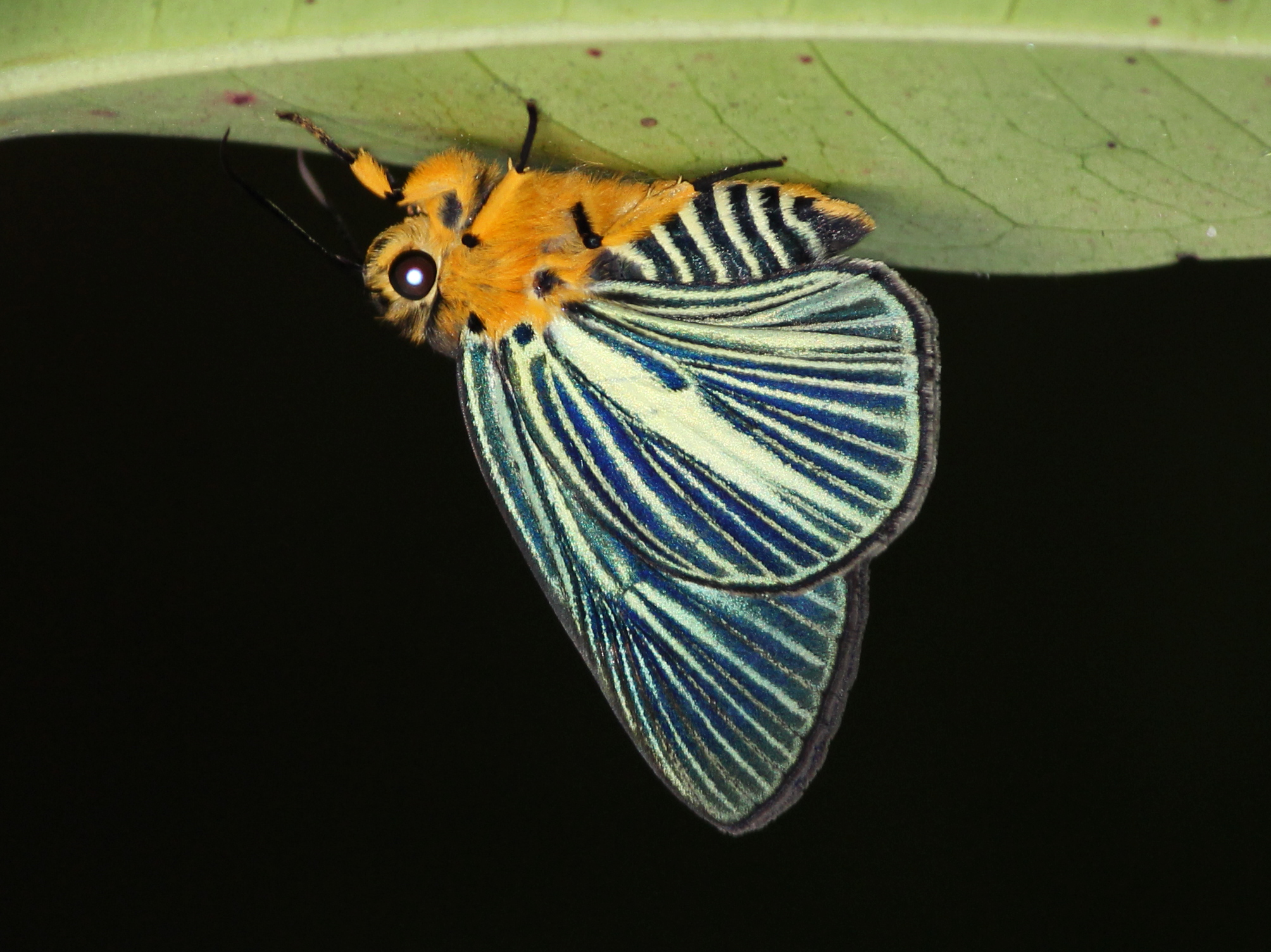
Ventral view

===== Burara jaina (orange awlet) =====
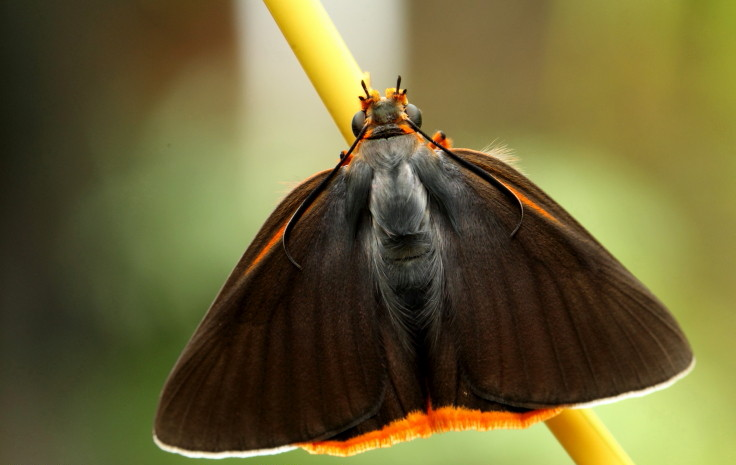
Dorsal view

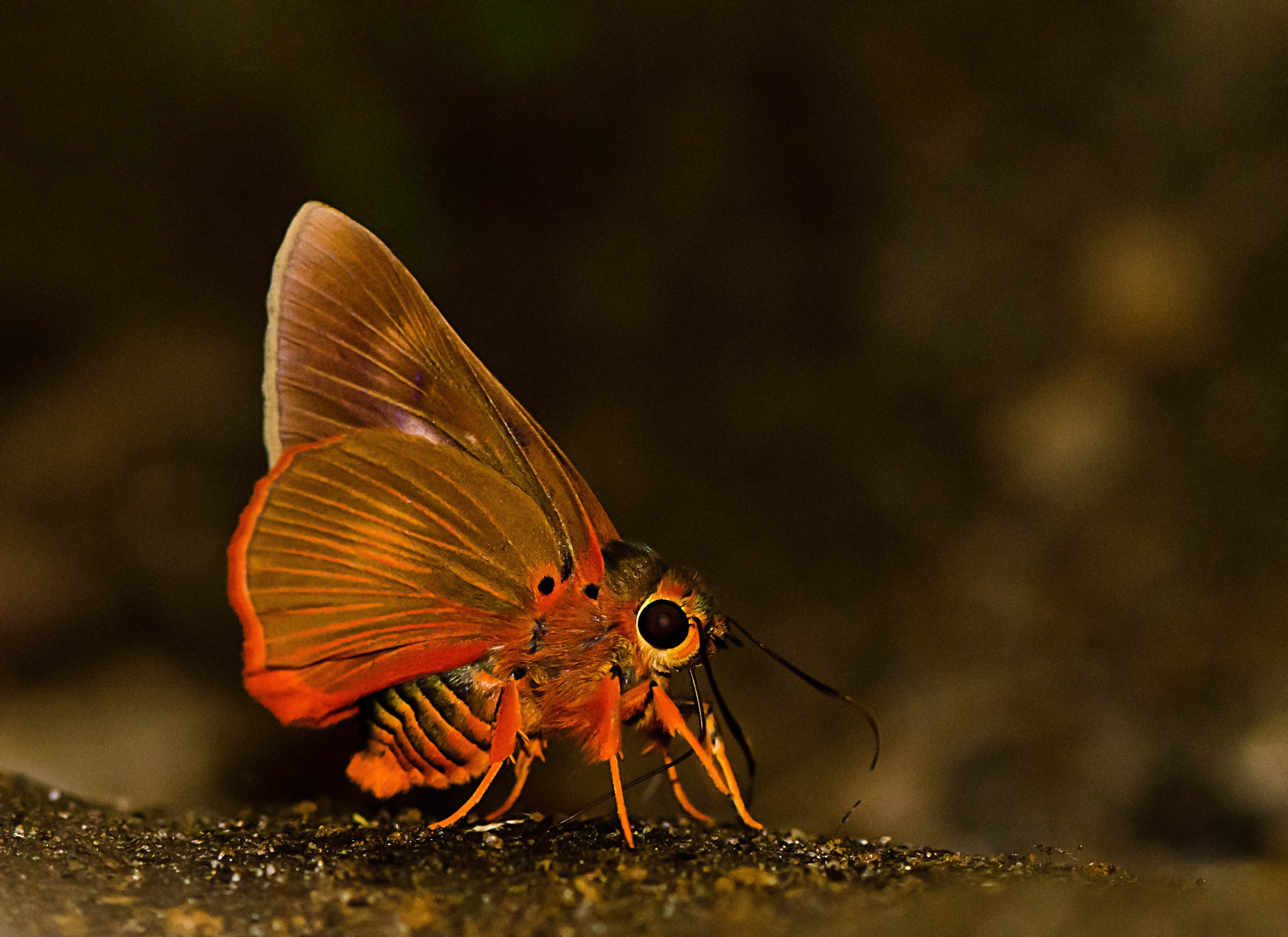
Ventral view

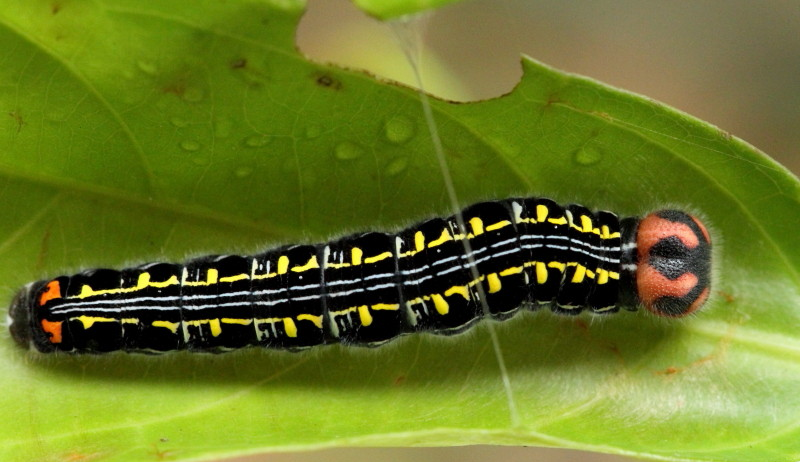
Larva

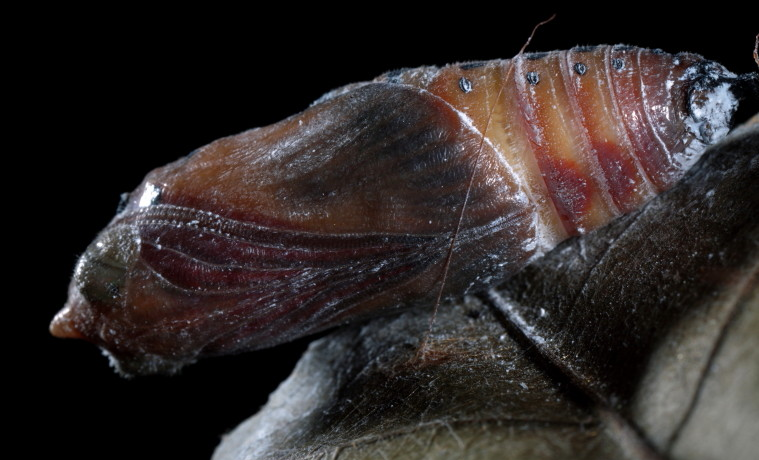
Chrysalis

==== Genus: Choaspes ====
===== Choaspes benjaminii (Indian awlking) =====
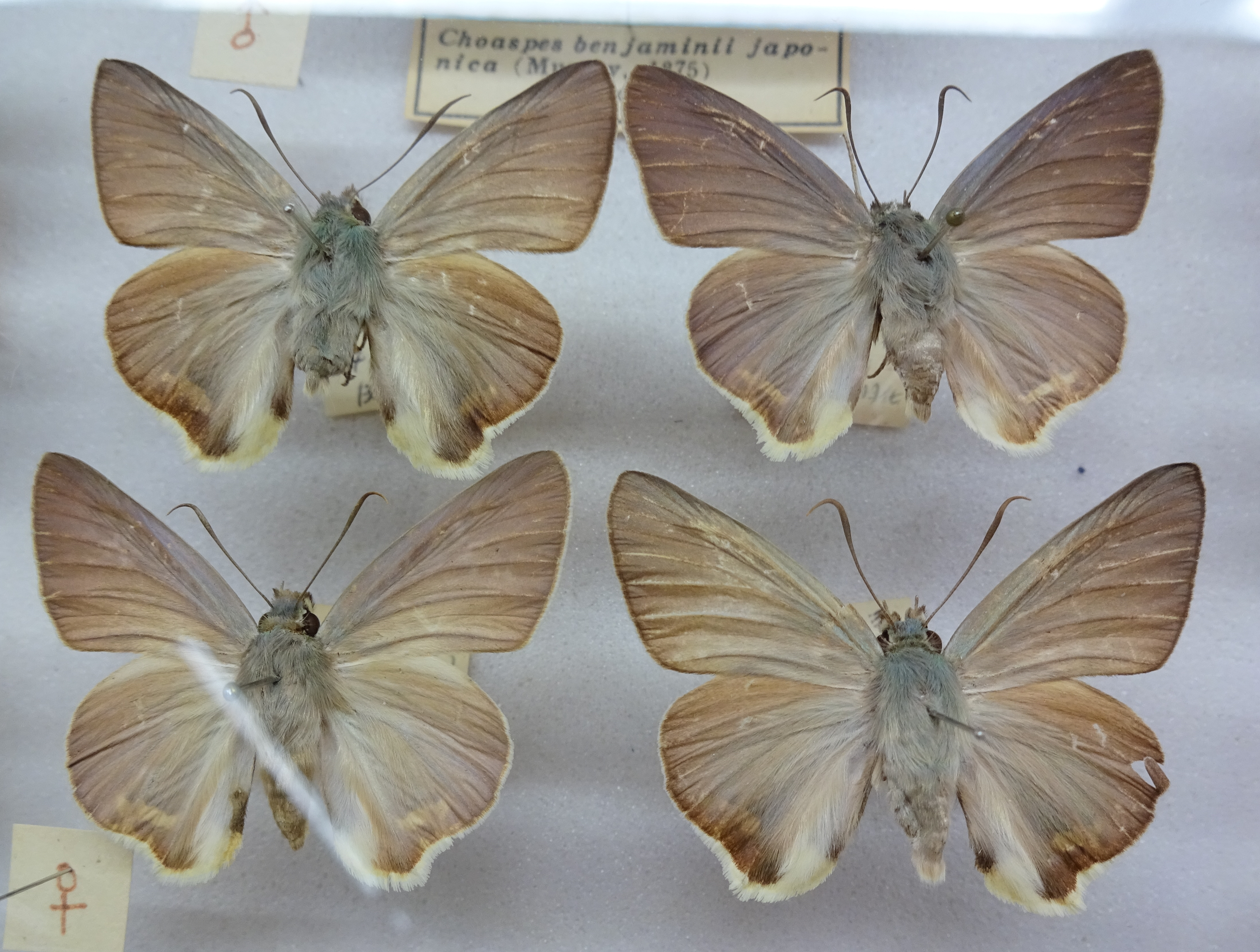
Museum specimen

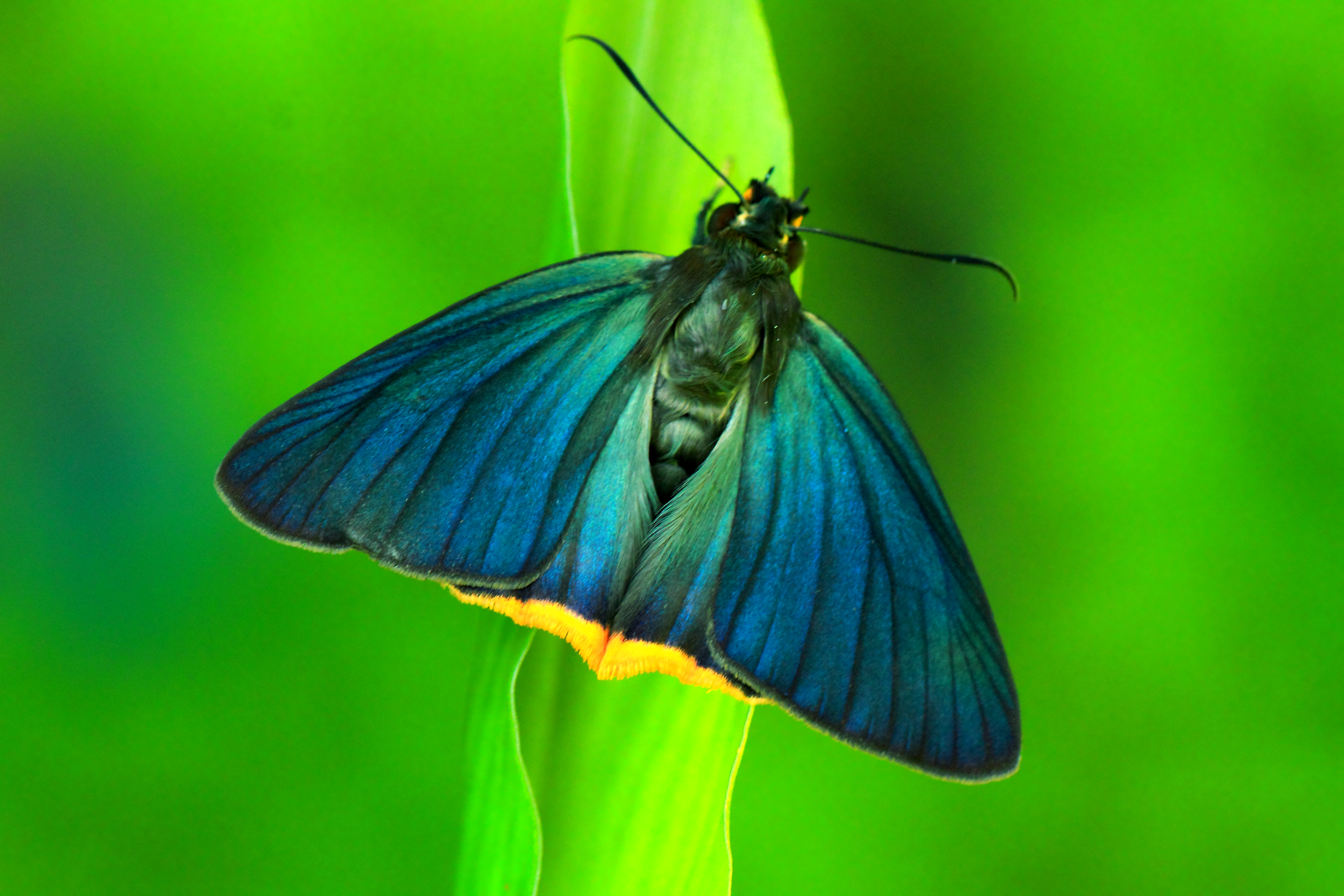
Dorsal view

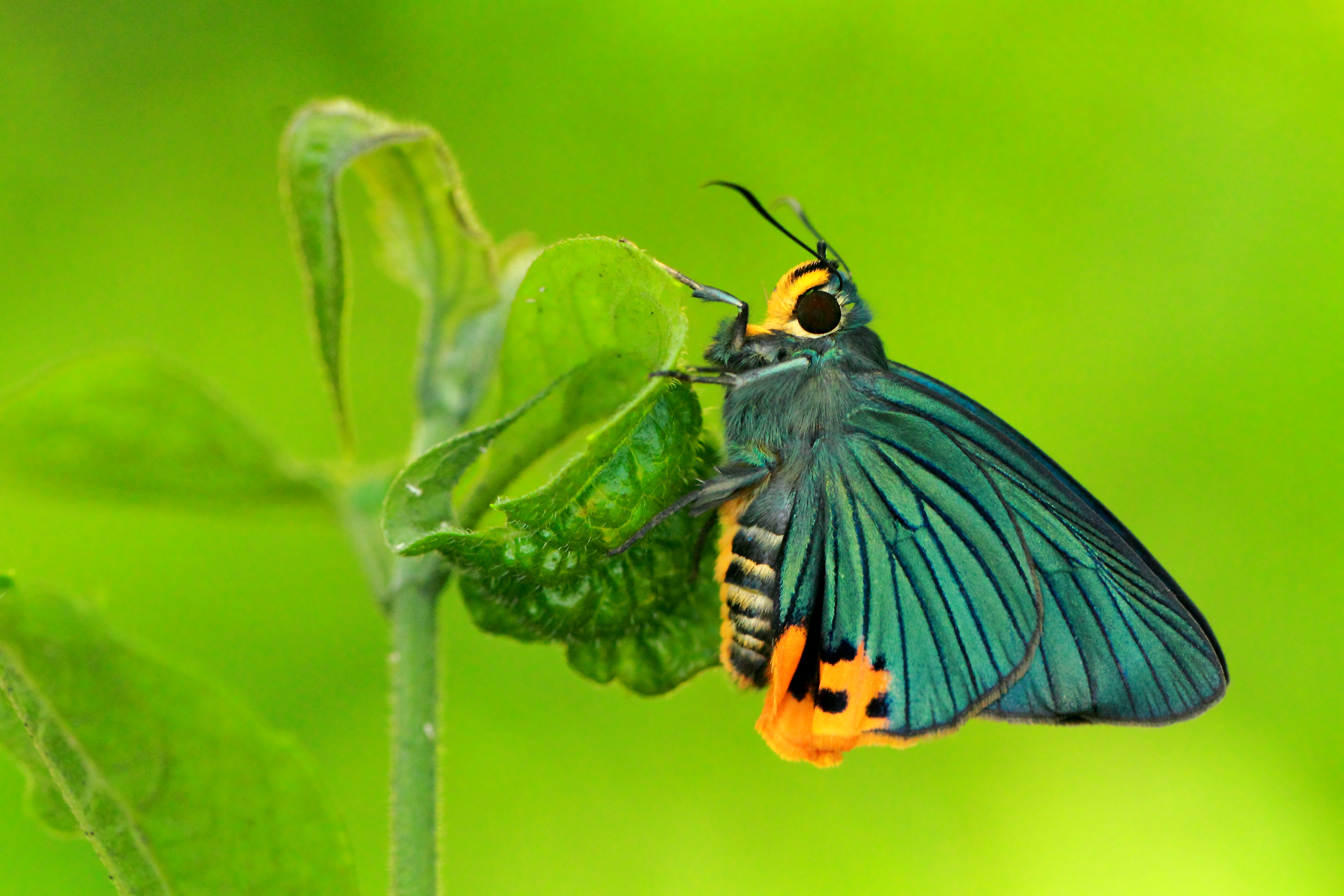
Ventral view

==== Genus: Hasora ====
===== Hasora badra (common awl) =====
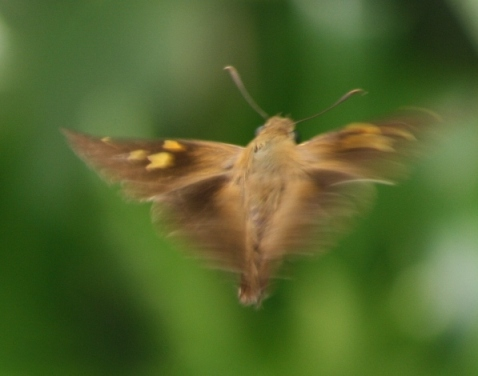
Dorsal view

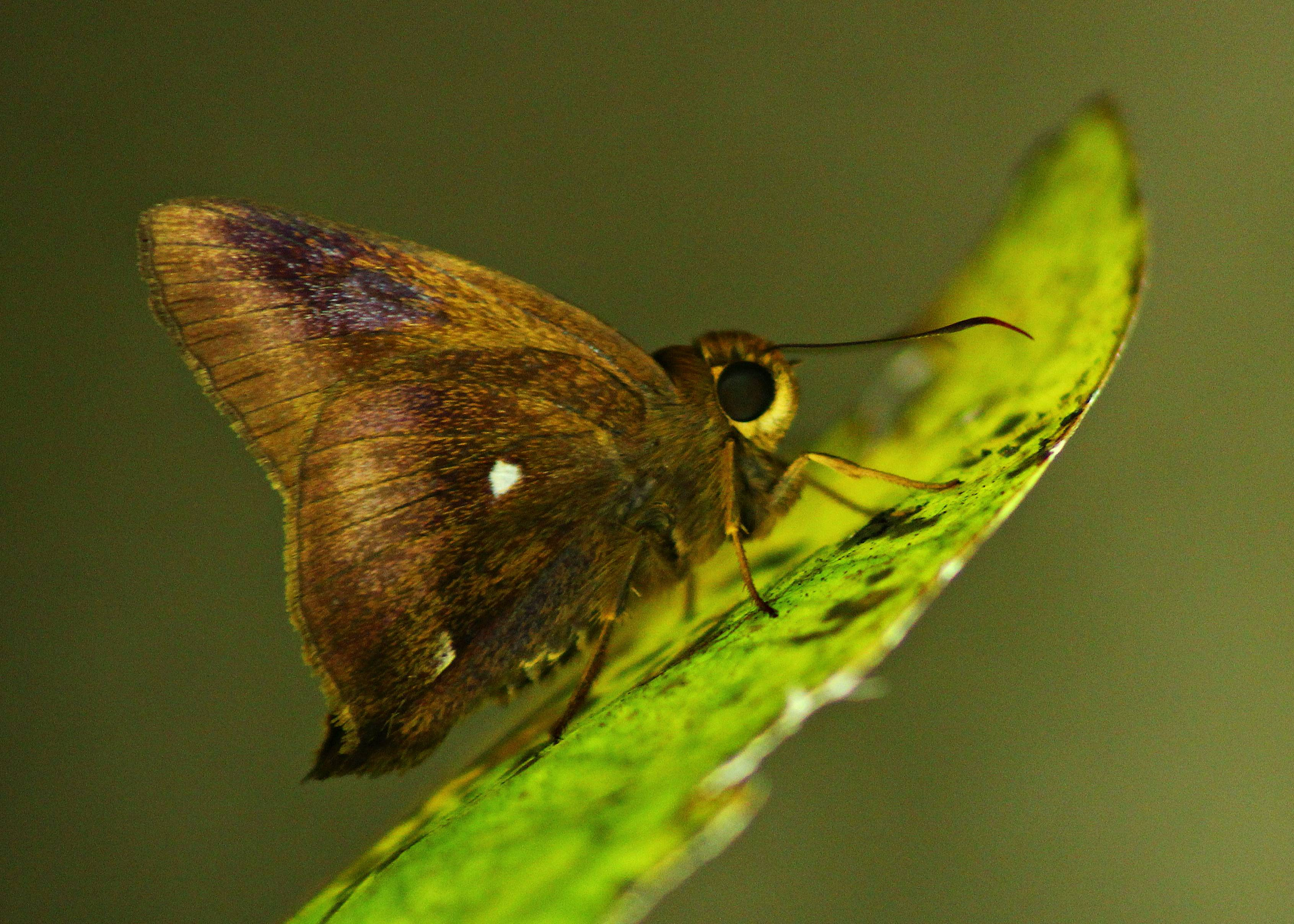
Ventral view

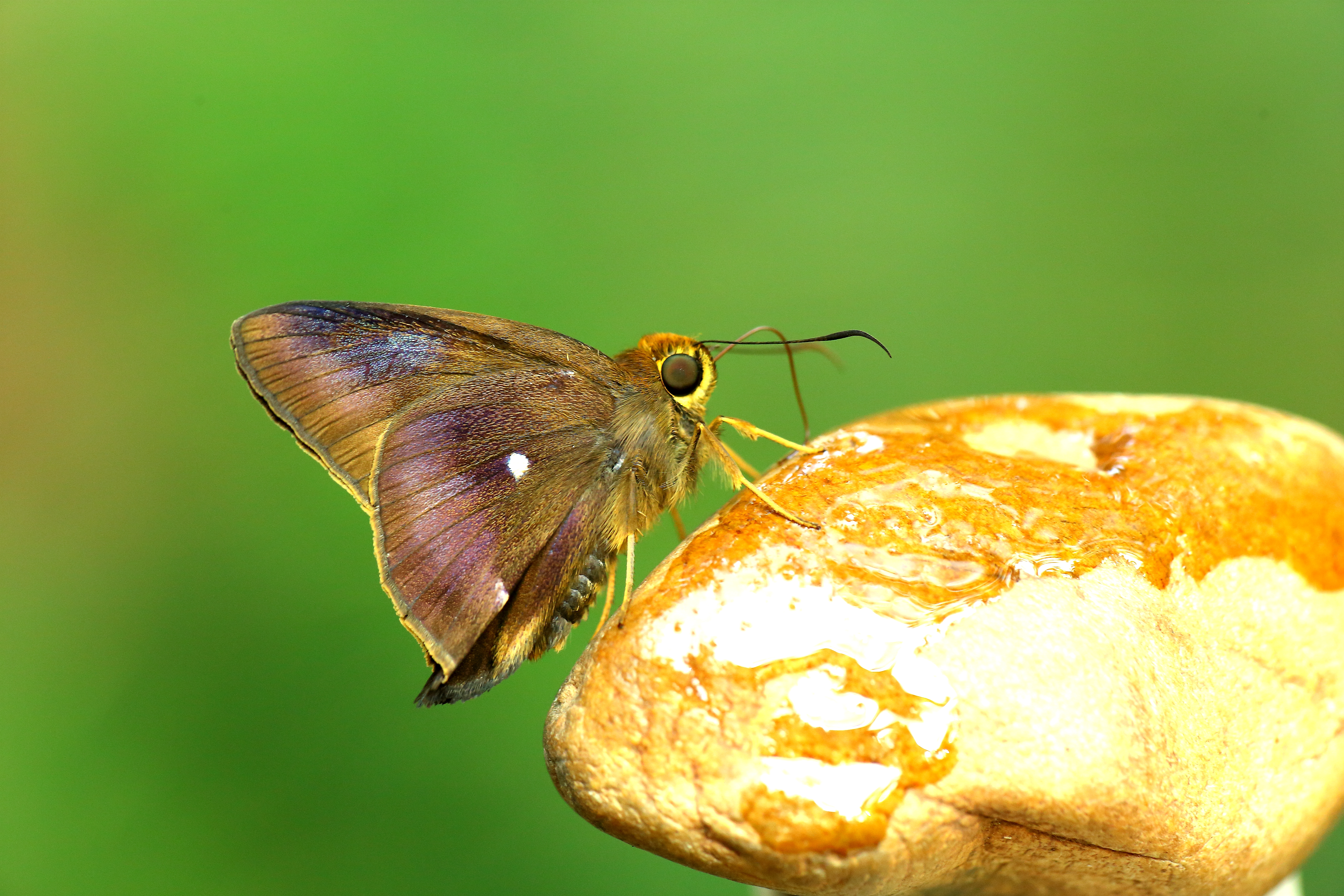
Ventral view

===== Hasora chromus (common banded awl) =====
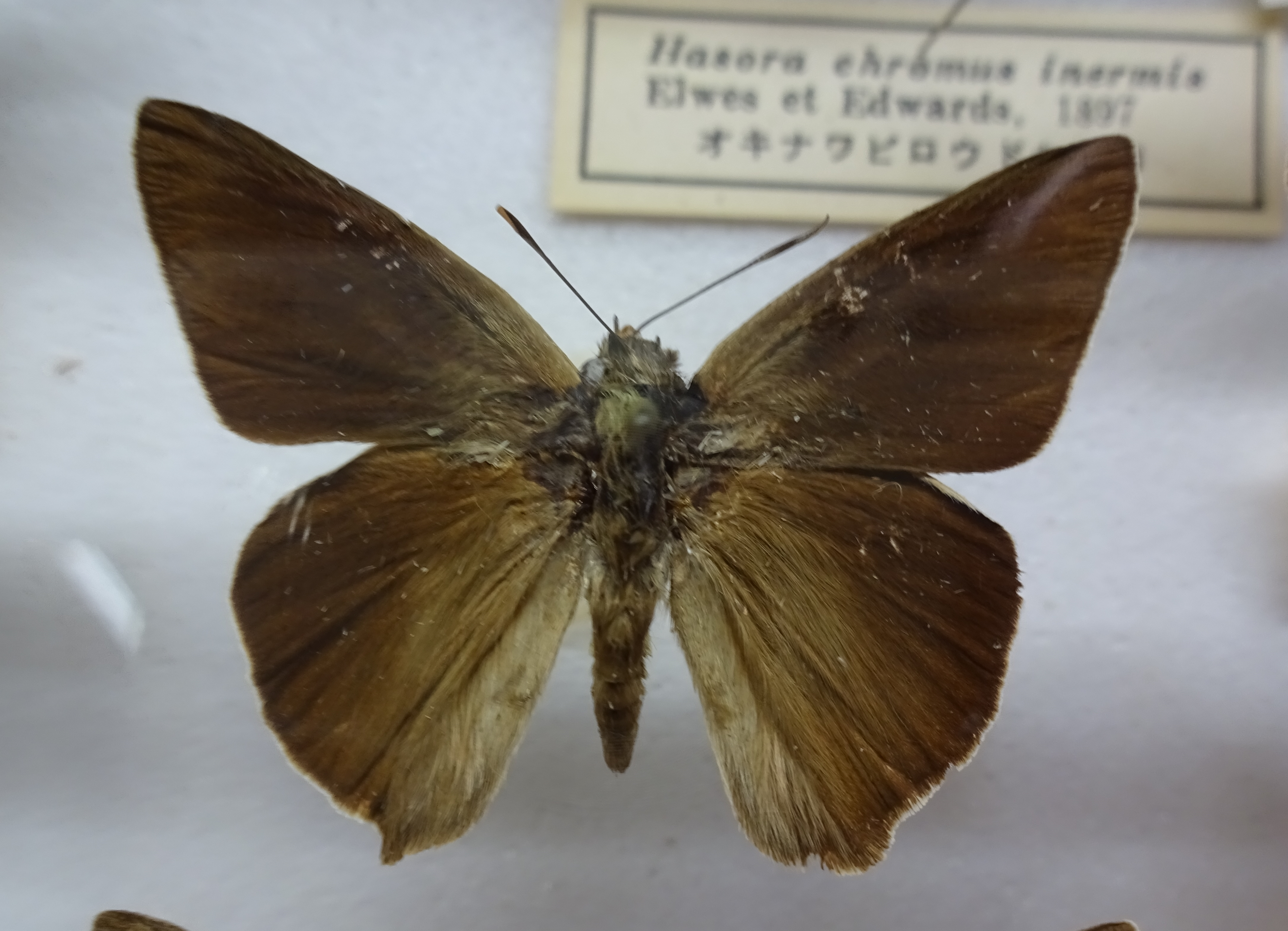
Museum specimen

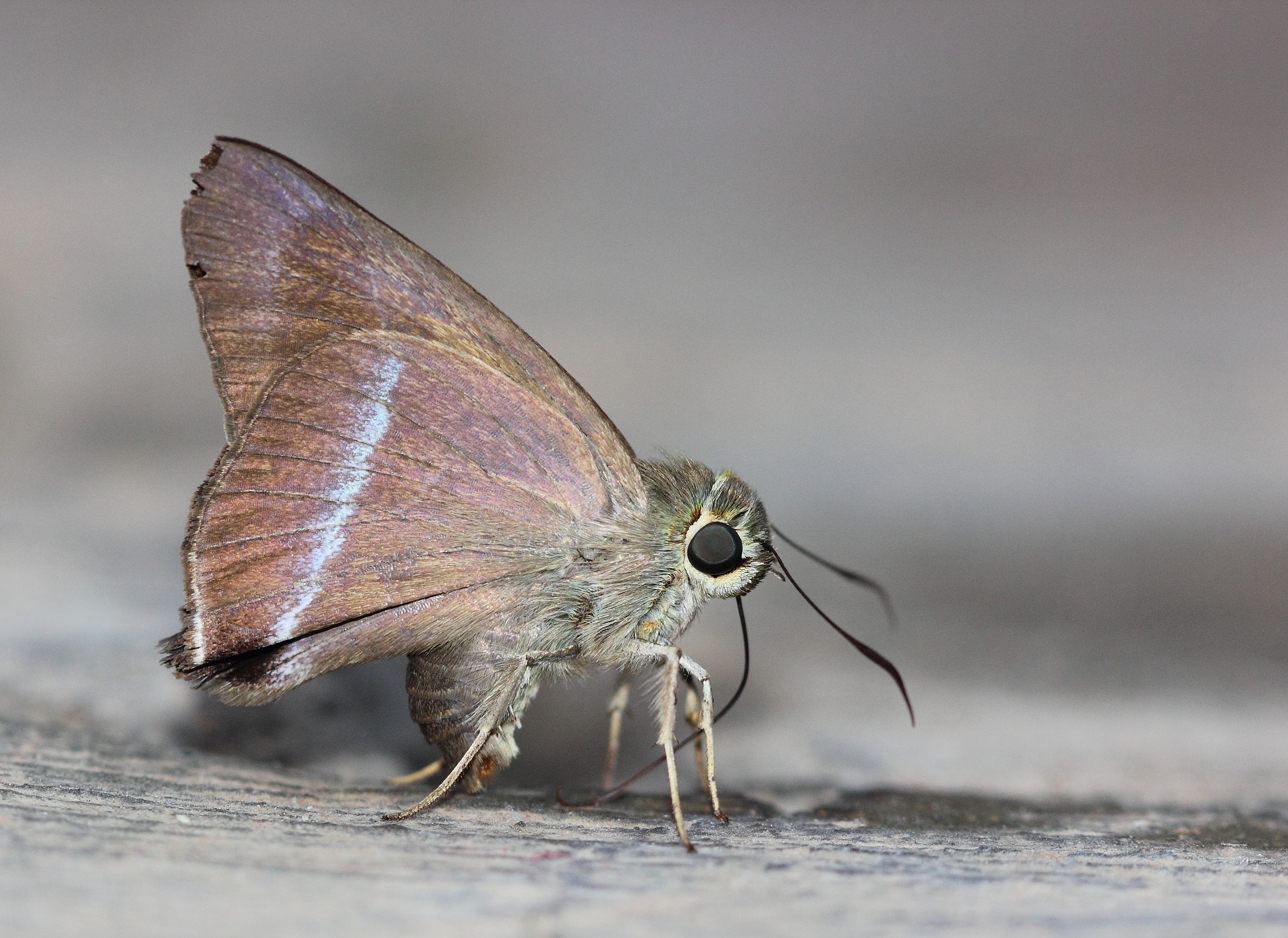
Ventral view

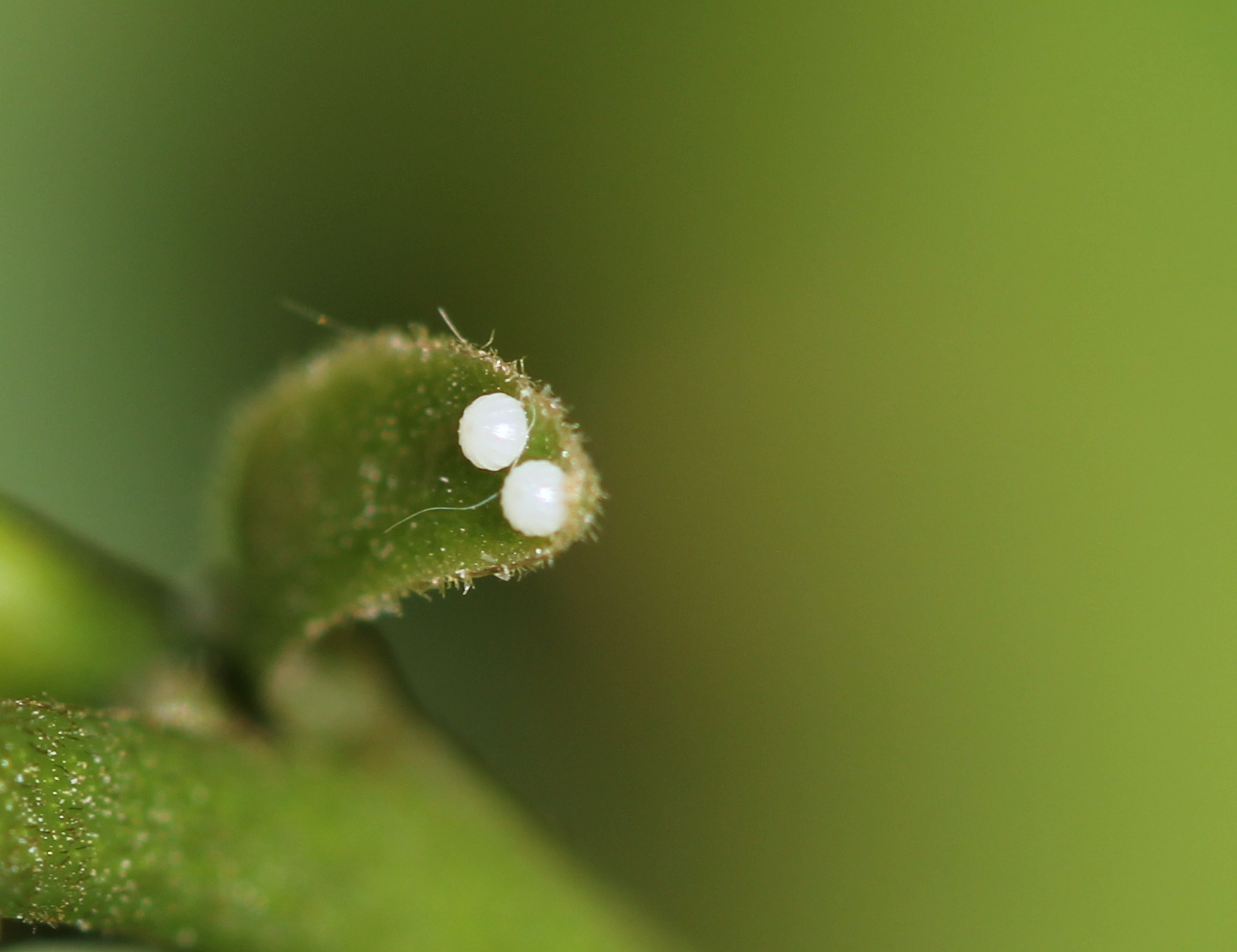
Eggs

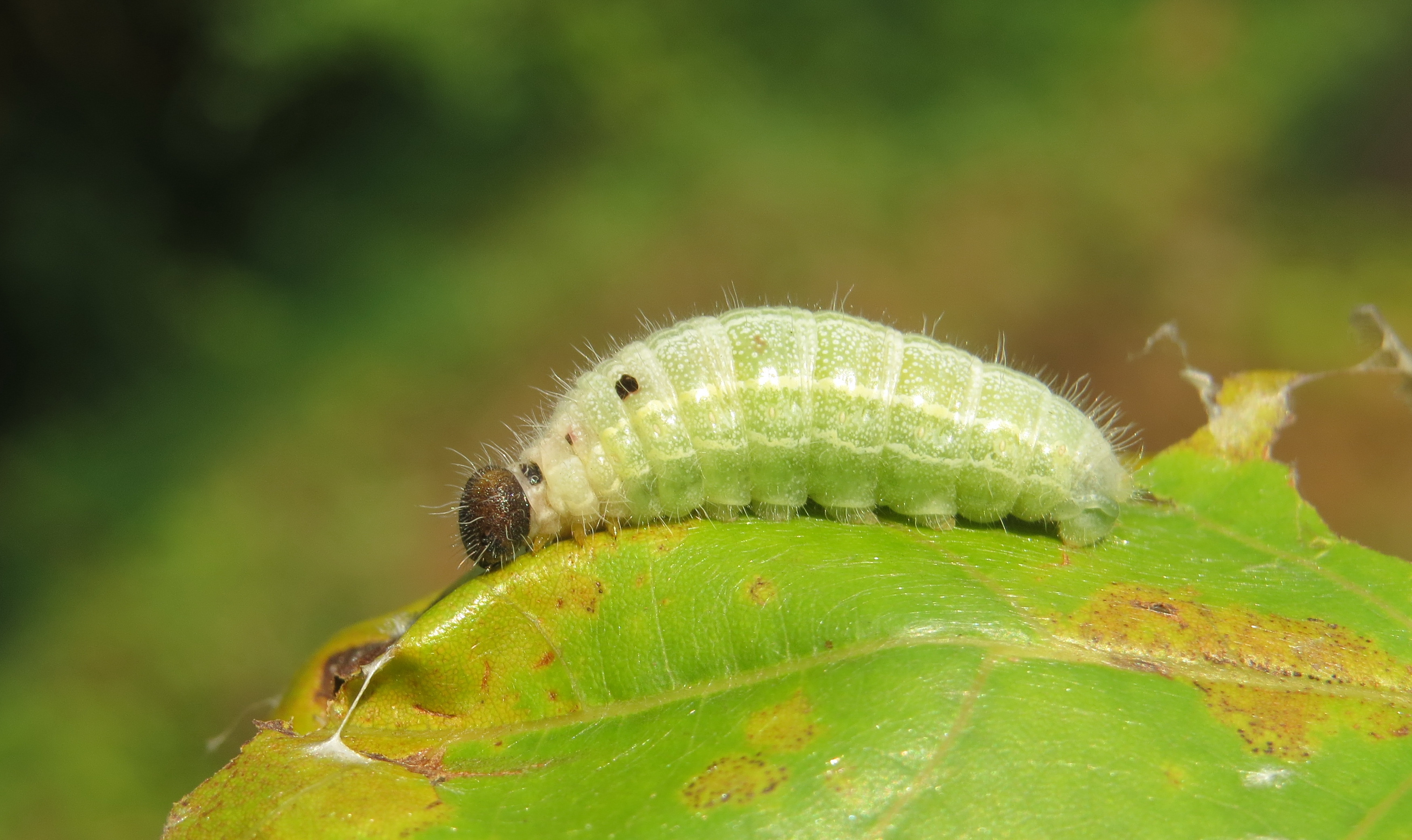
Larva

===== Hasora taminatus (white banded awl) =====
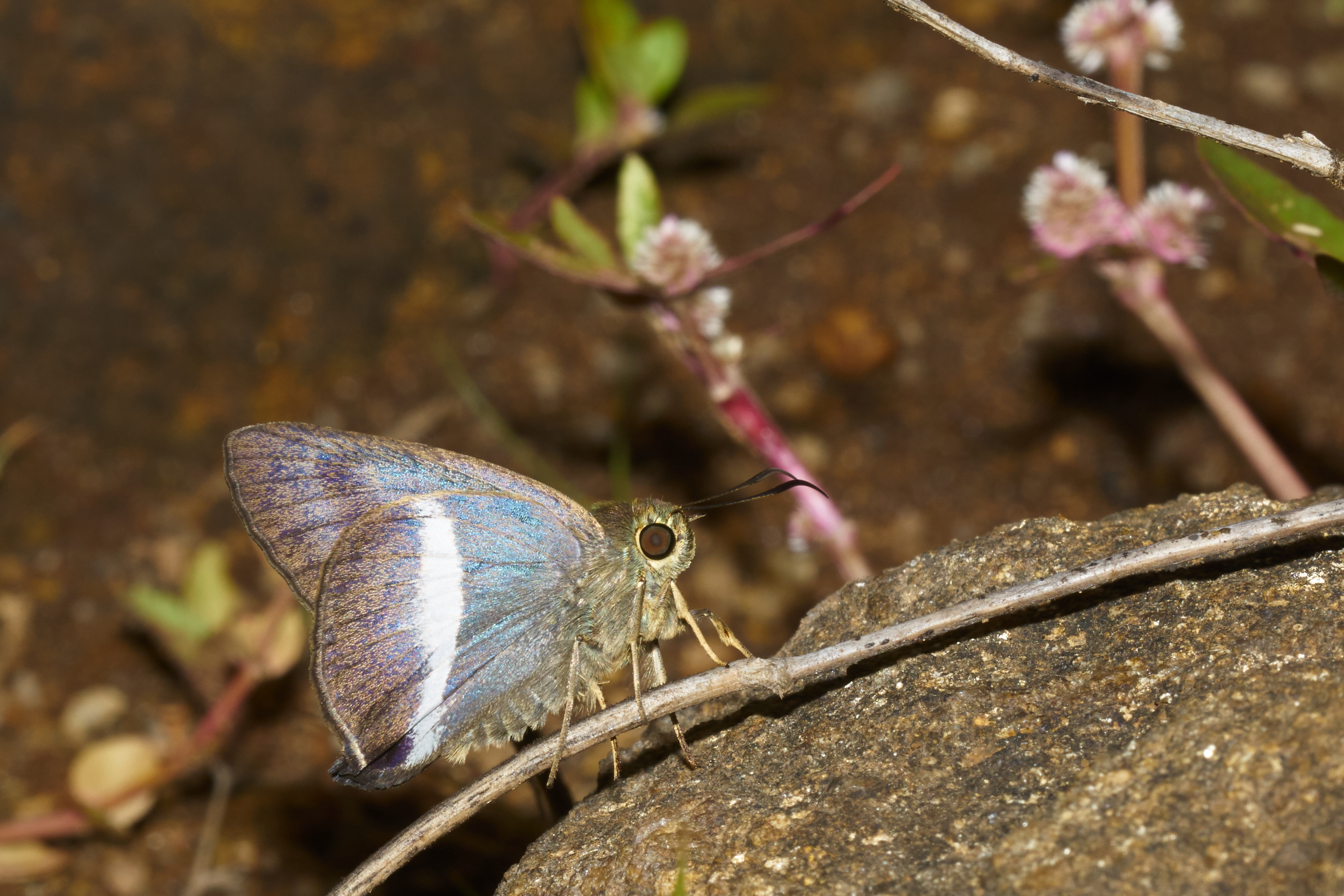
Ventral view

===== Hasora vitta (plain banded awl) =====
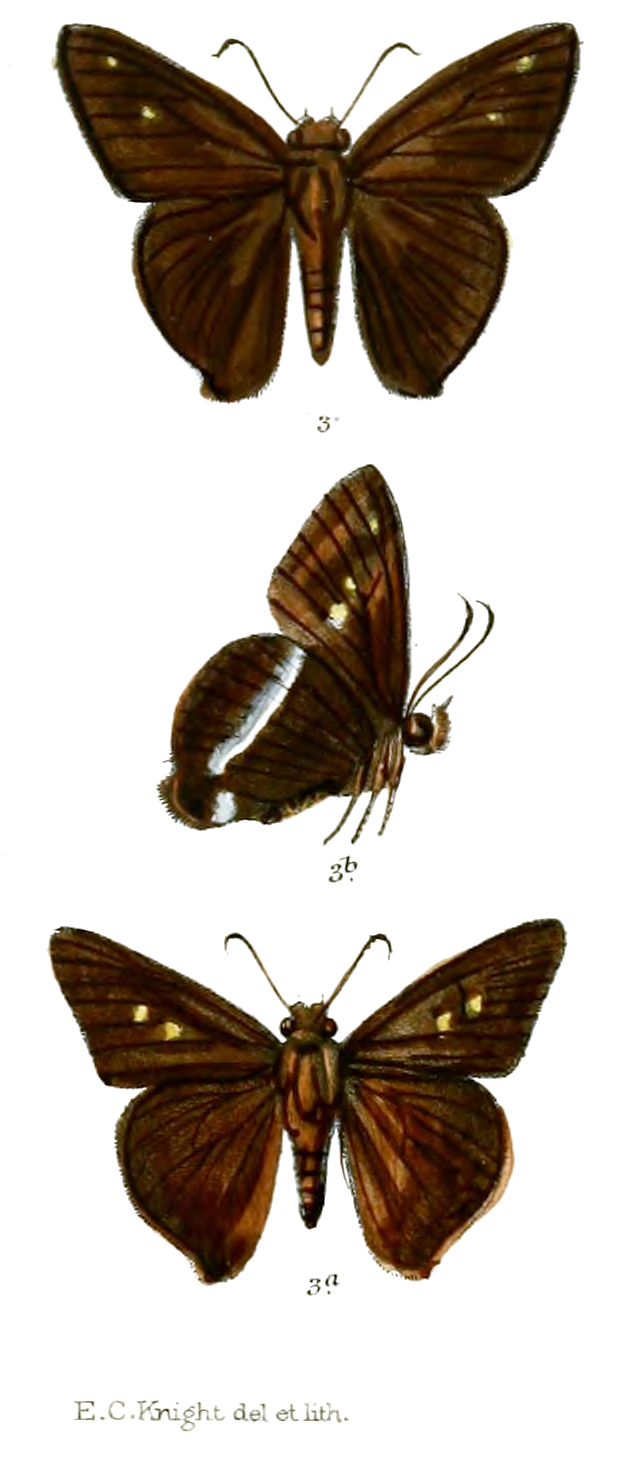
Illustration

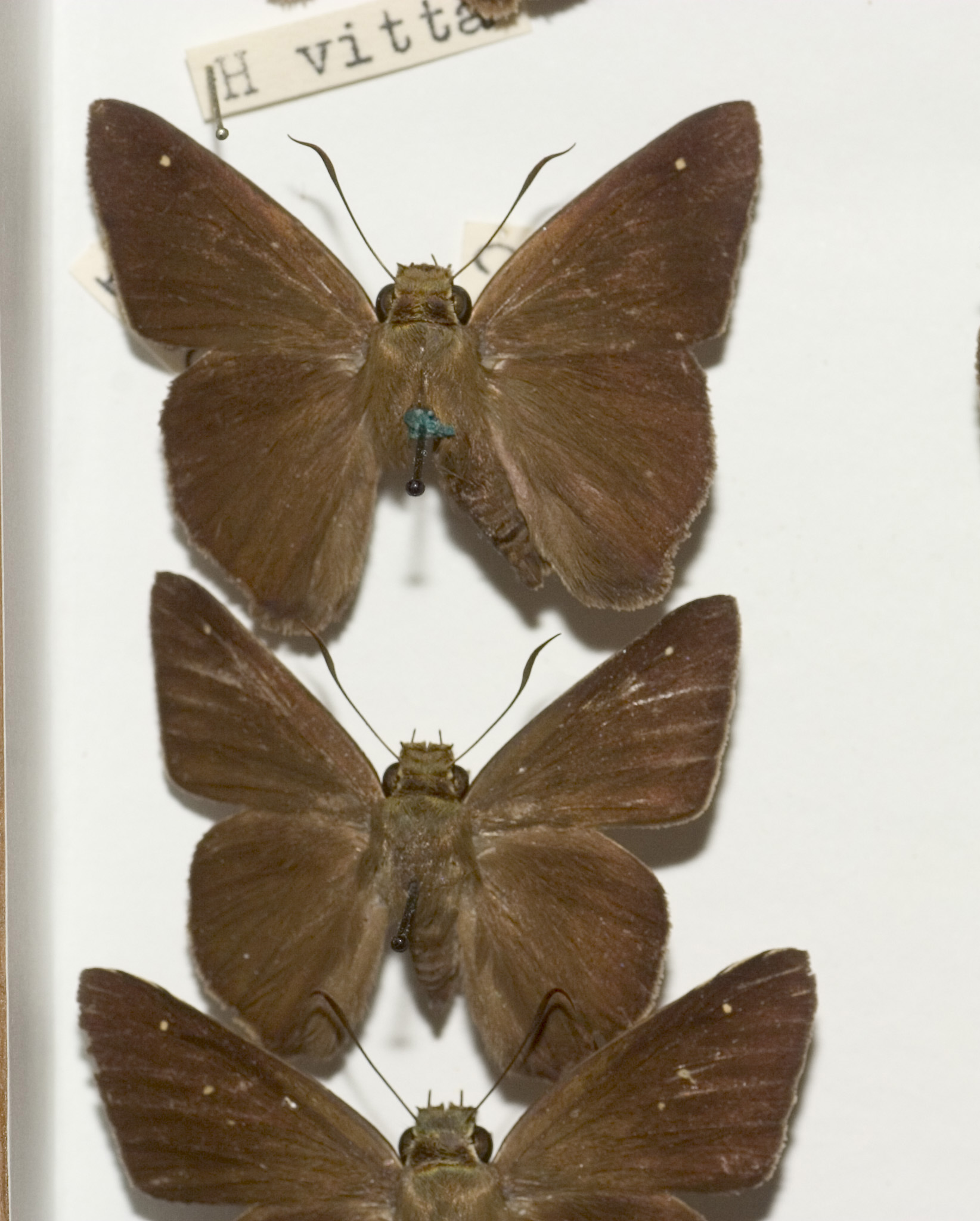
Museum specimen

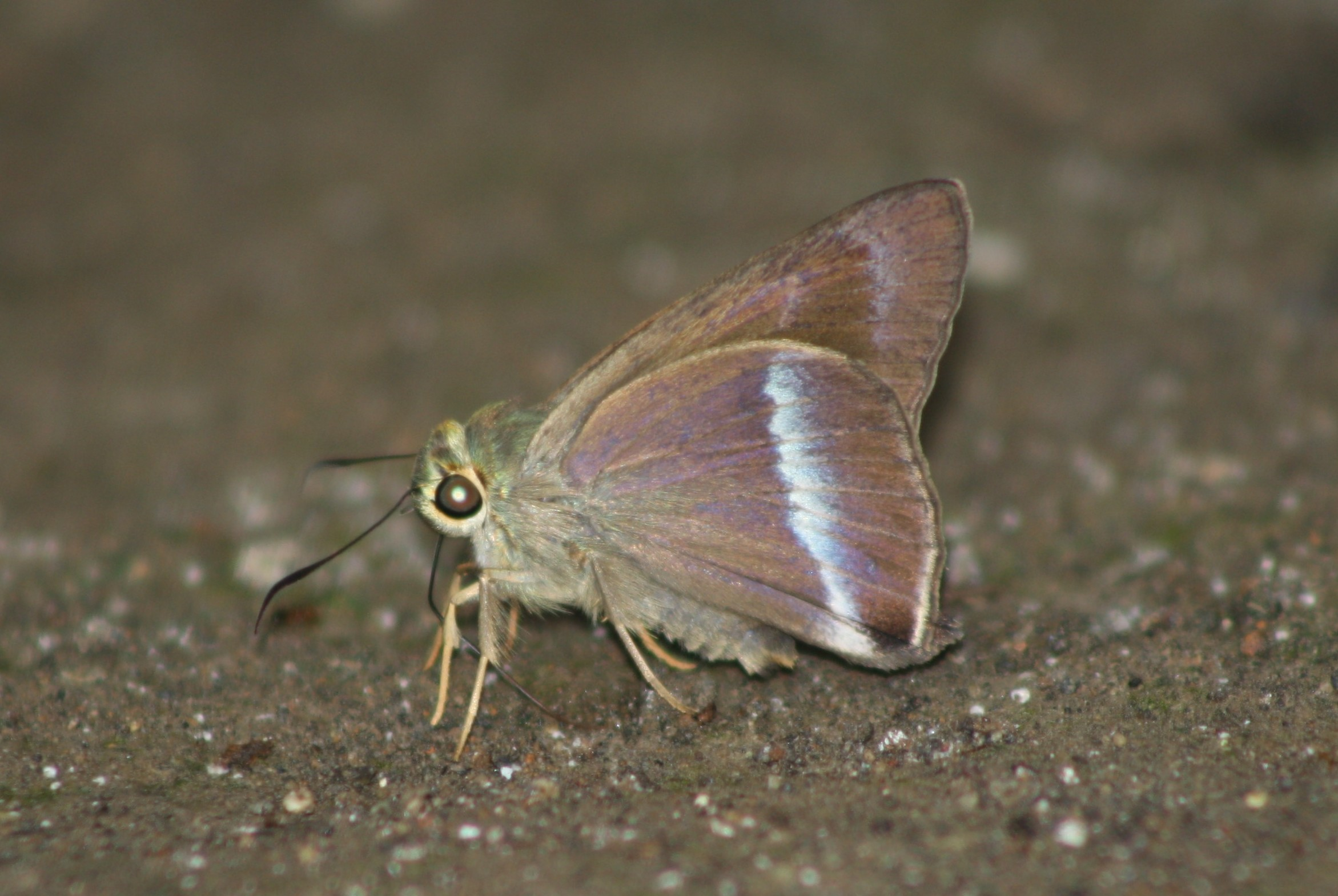
Ventral view

=== Subfamily: Hesperiinae ===
==== Genus: Aeromachus ====
===== Aeromachus dubius (dingy scrub-hopper) =====
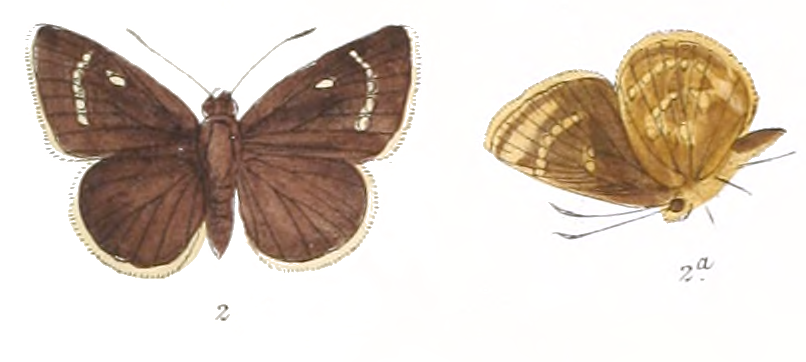
Illustration

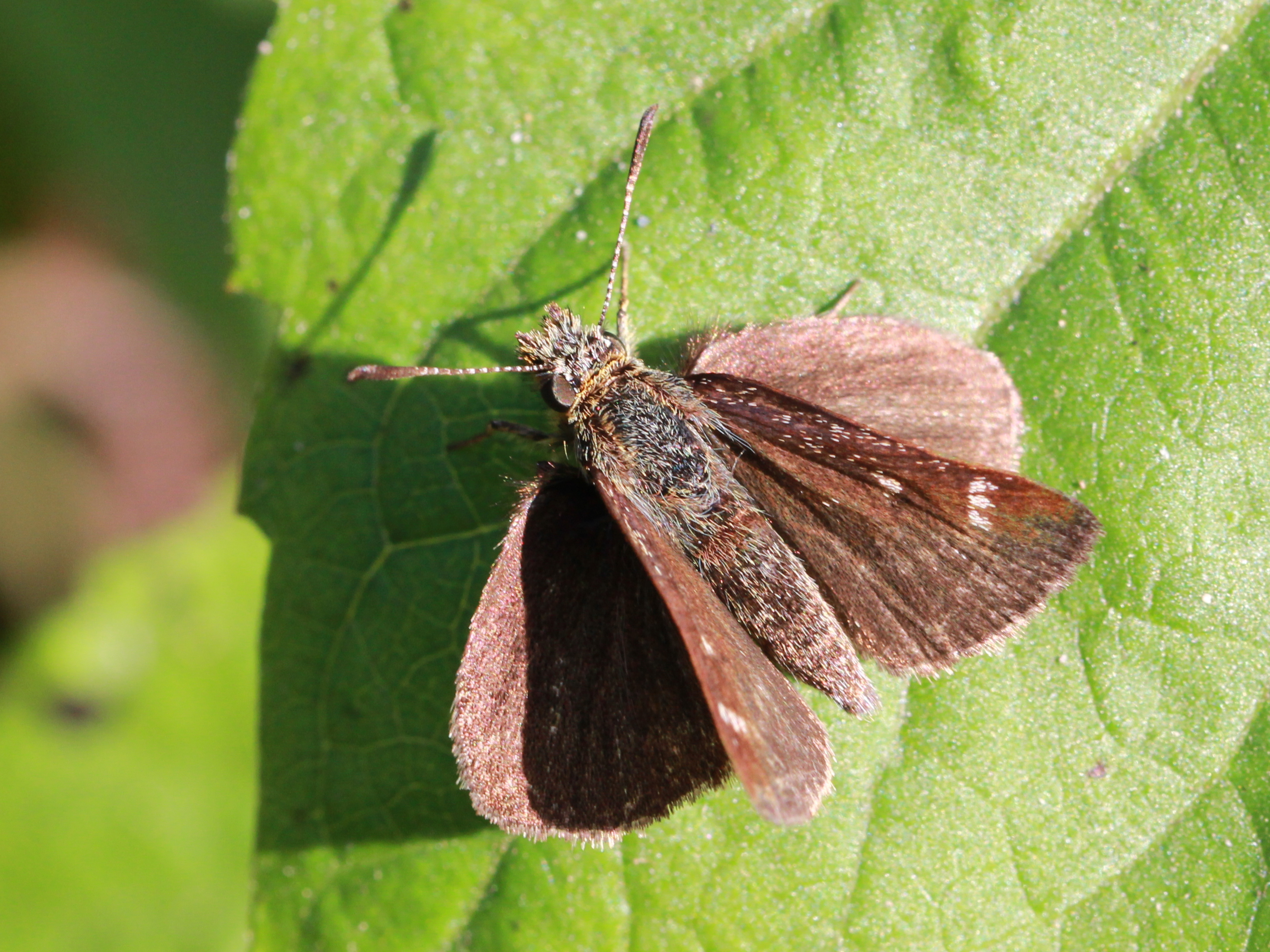
Dorsal view

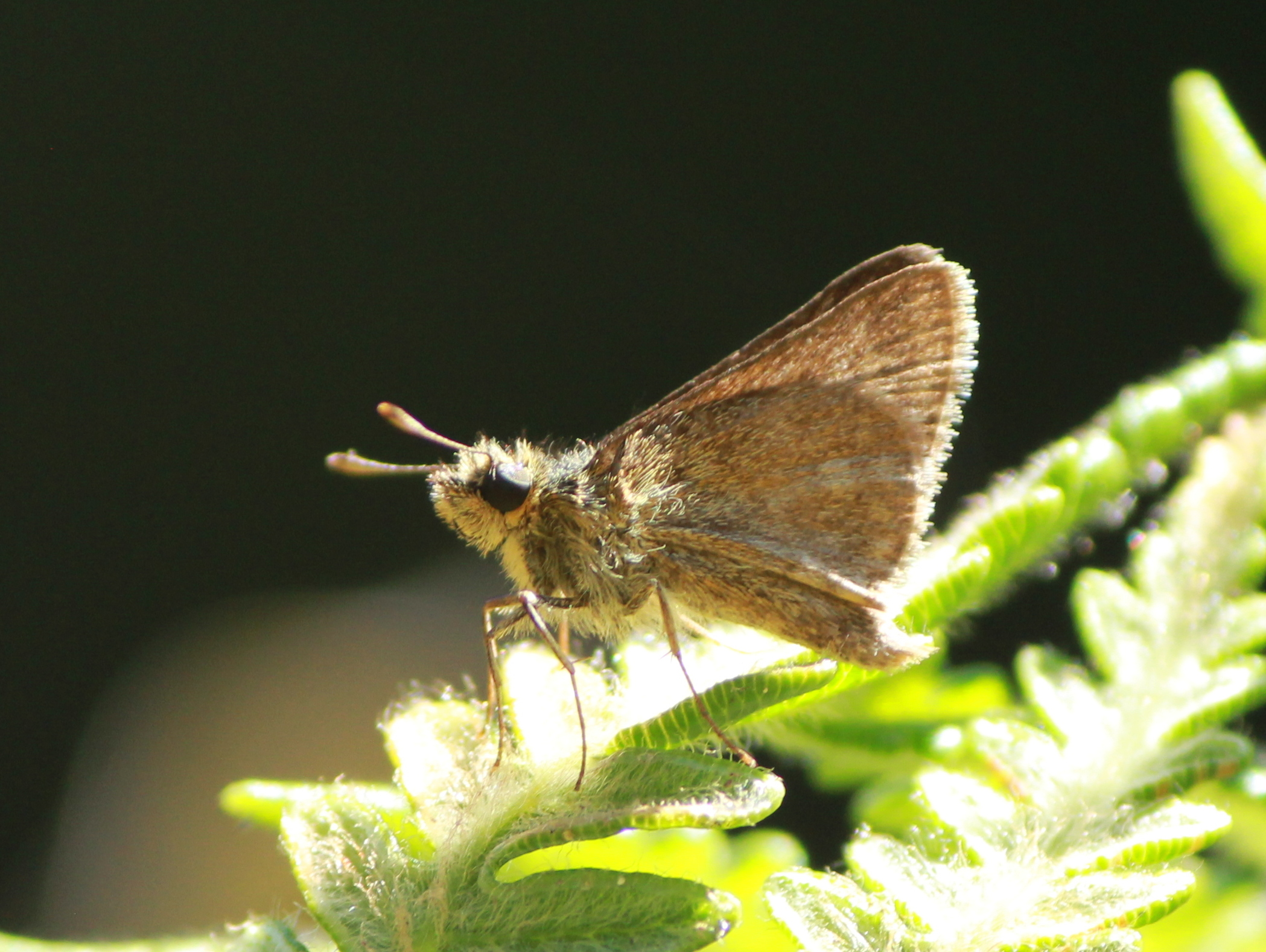
Ventral view

===== Aeromachus pygmaeus (pygmy scrub-hopper) =====
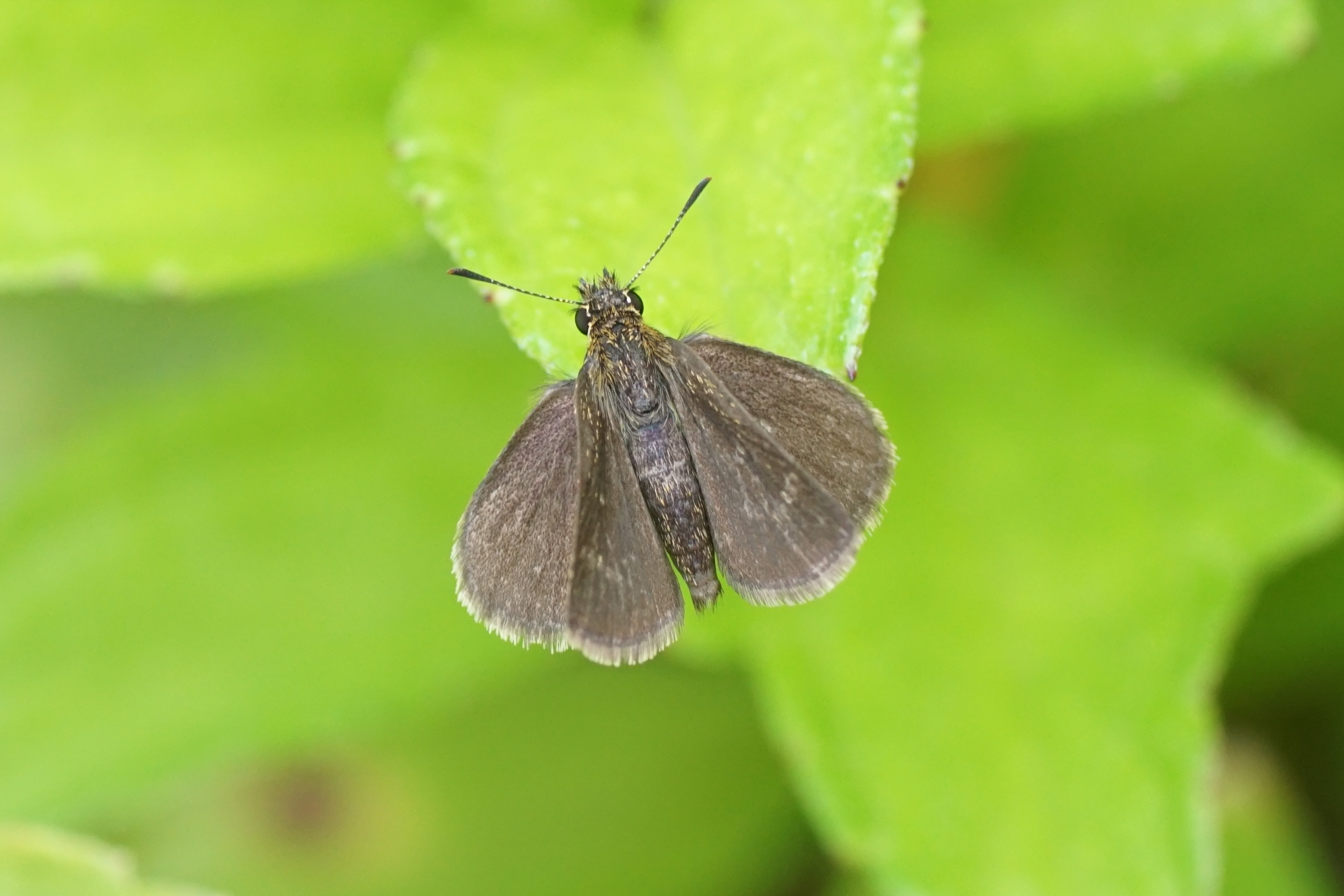
Dorsal view

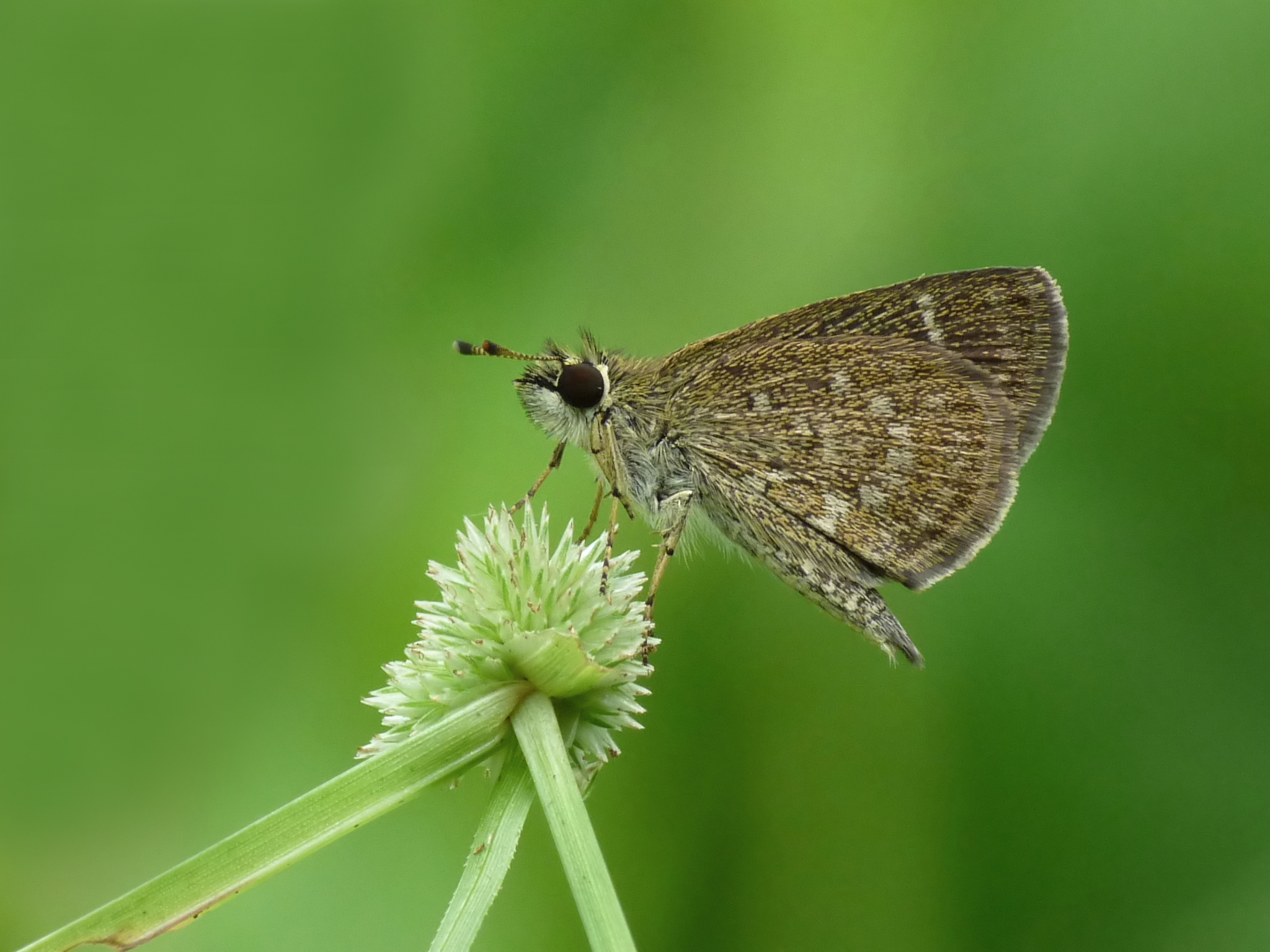
Ventral view

==== Genus: Ampittia ====
===== Ampittia dioscorides (bush hopper) =====
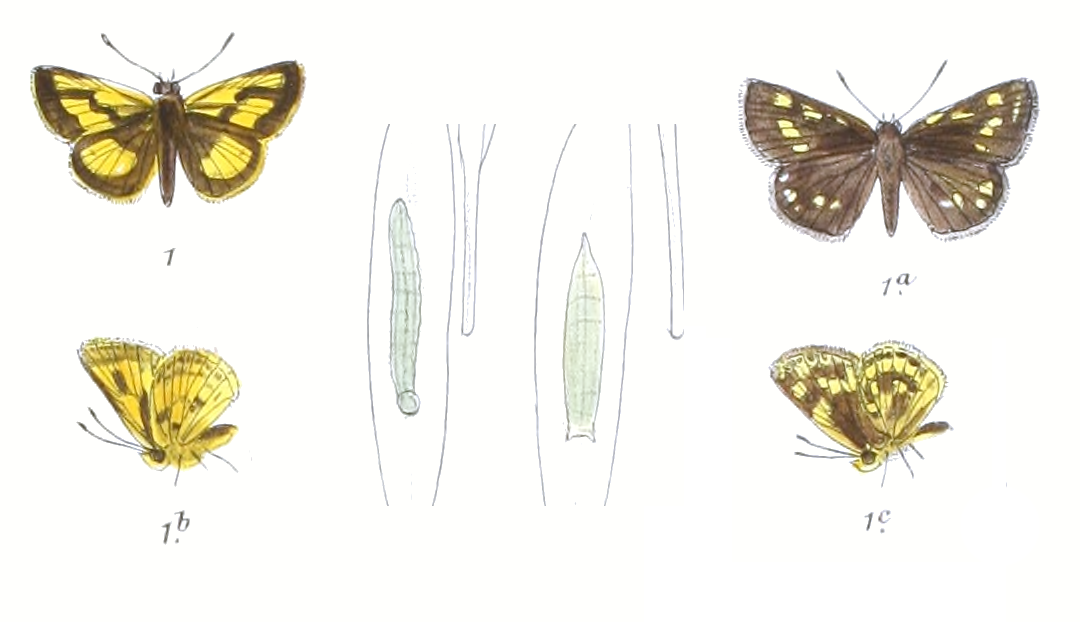
Illustration

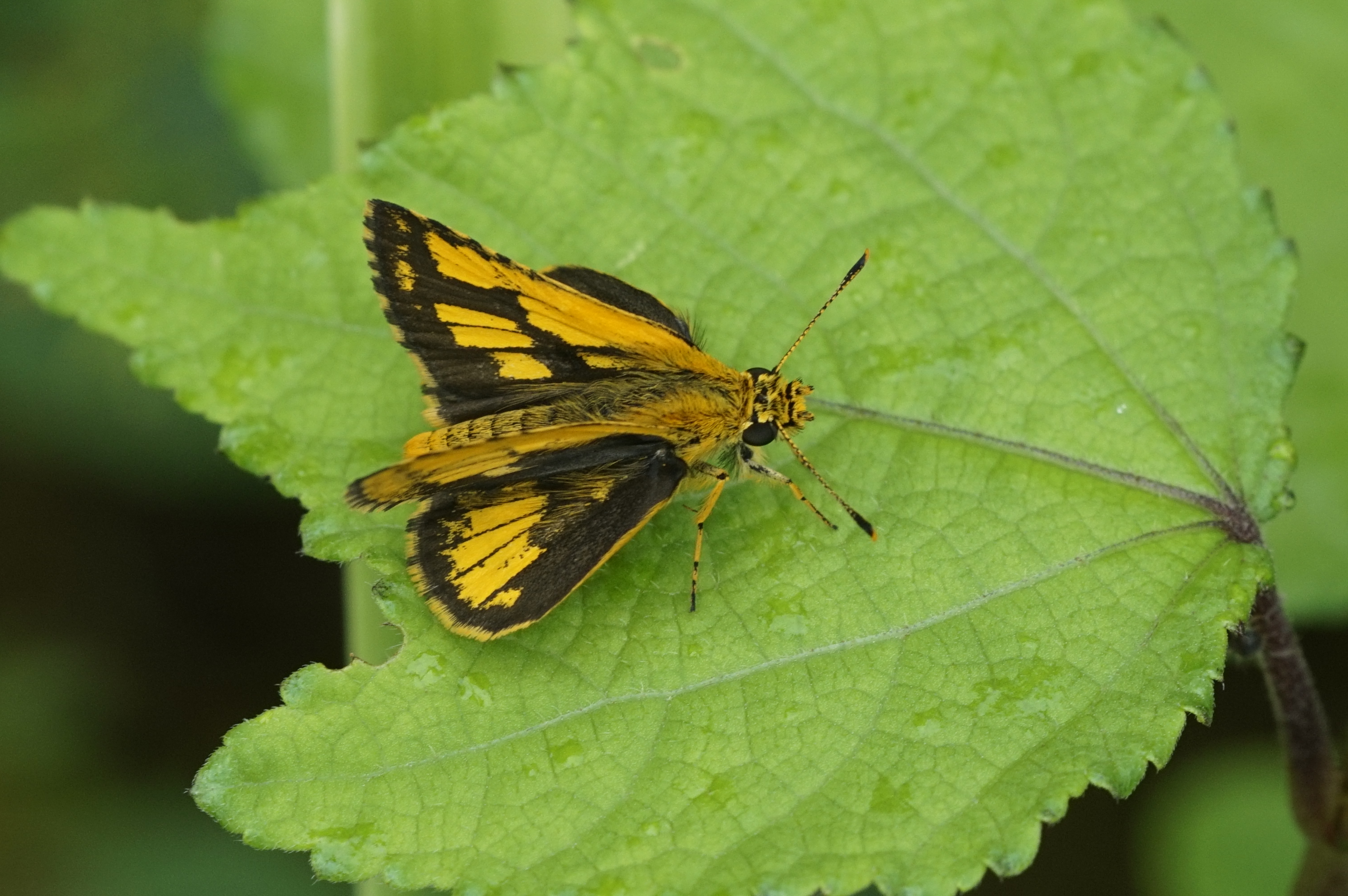
Dorsal view (male)

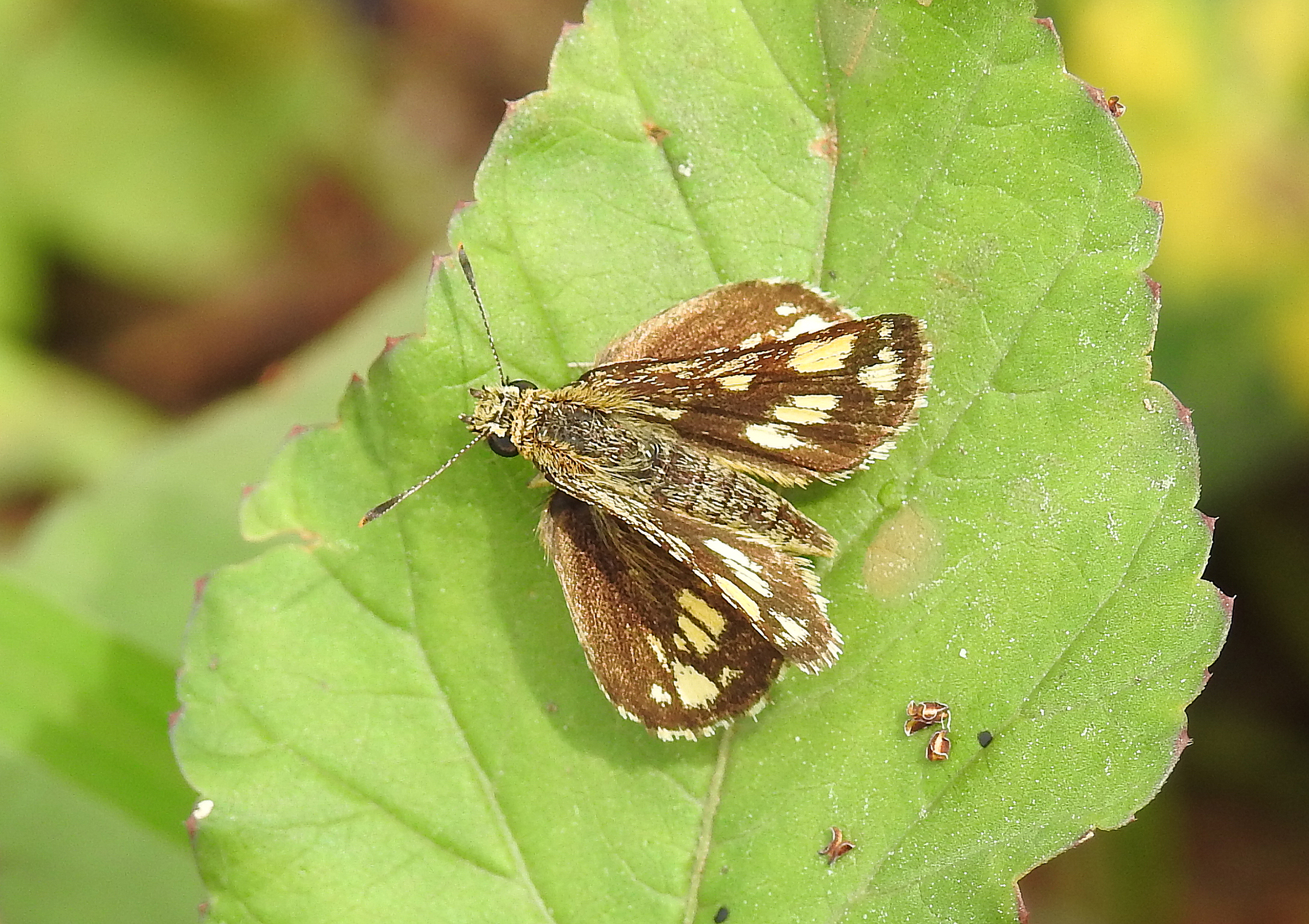
Dorsal view (female)

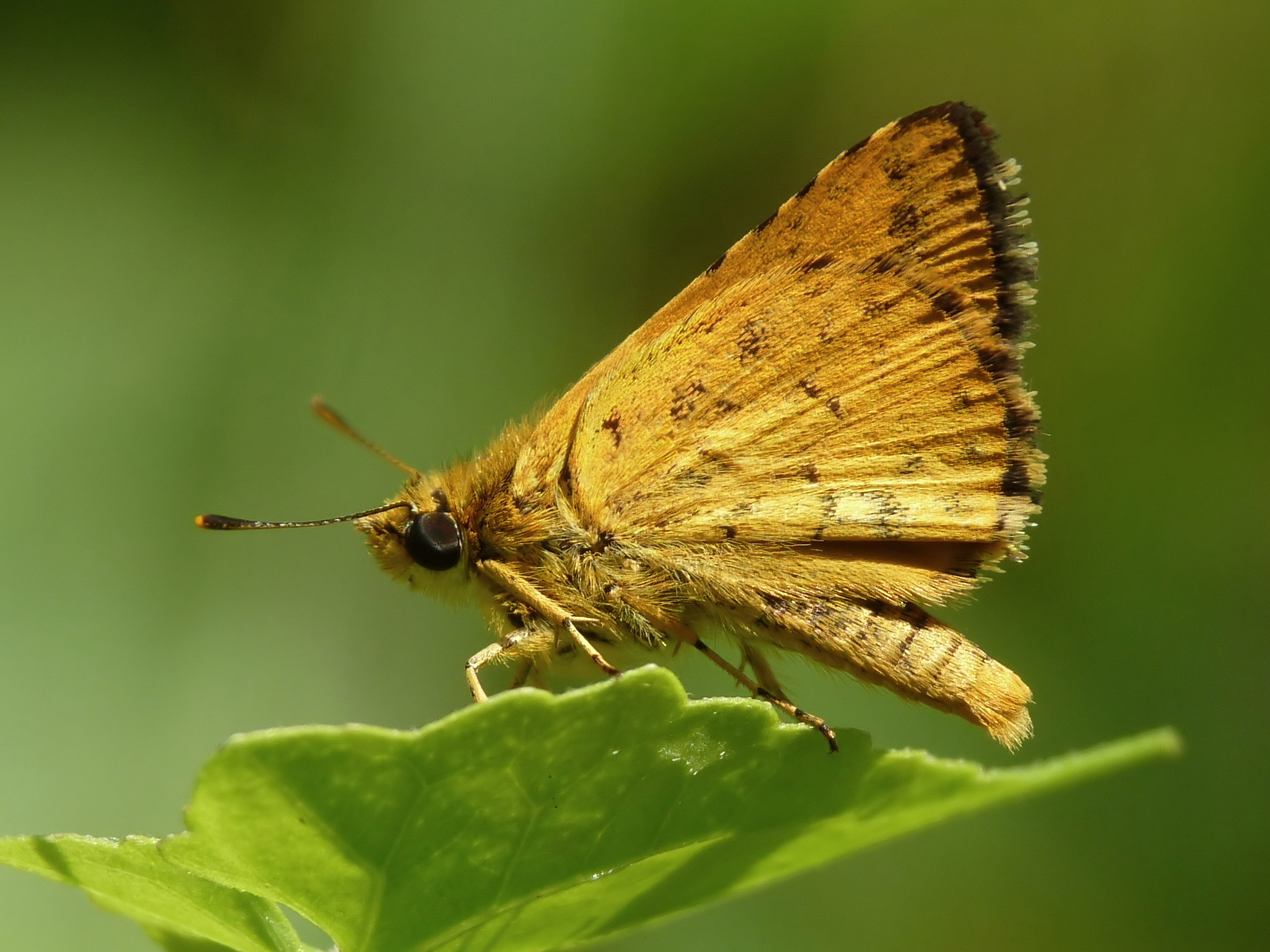
Ventral view (male)

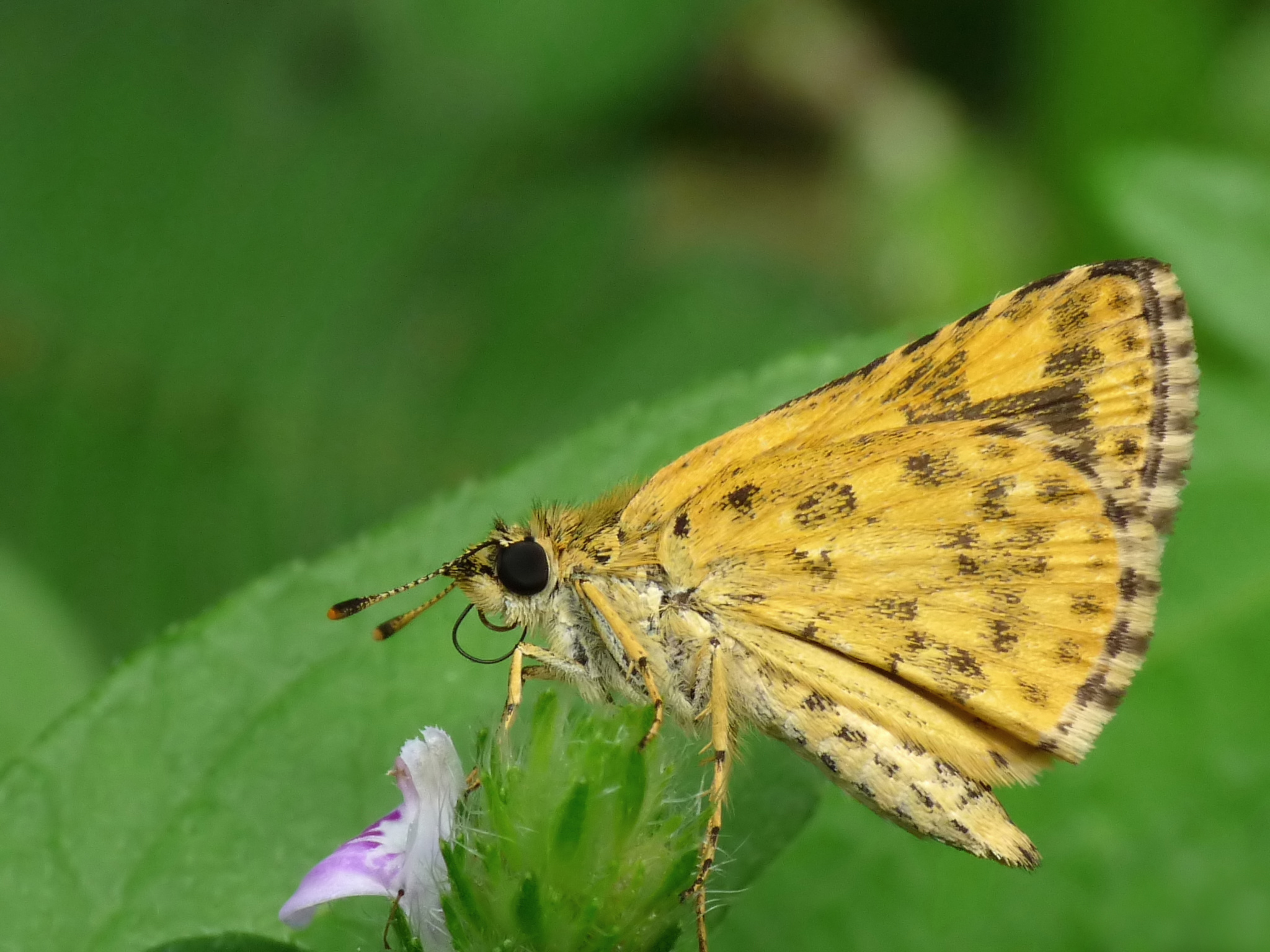
Ventral view (female)

==== Genus: Arnetta ====
===== Arnetta mercara (Coorg forest hopper) =====
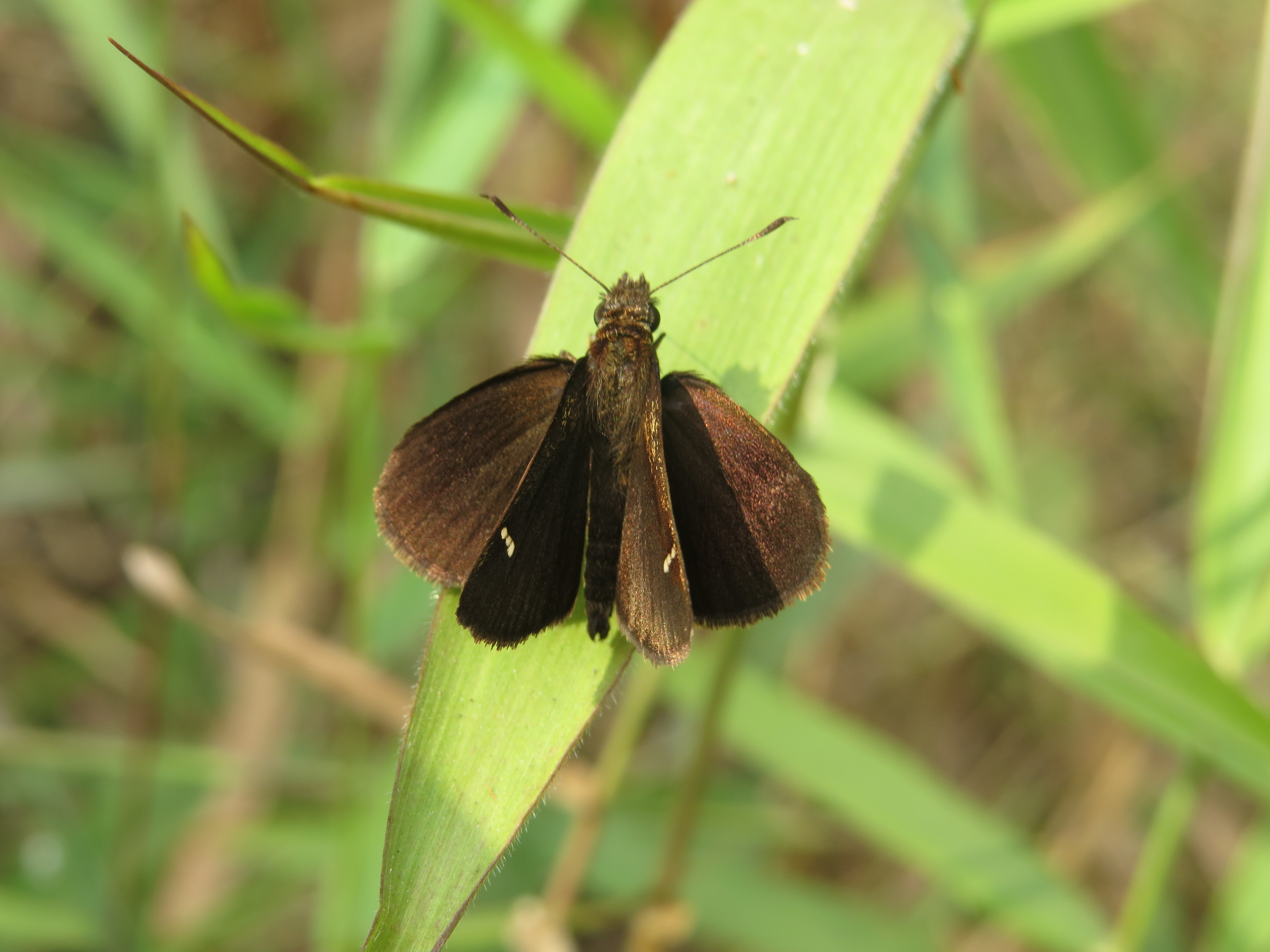
Dorsal view

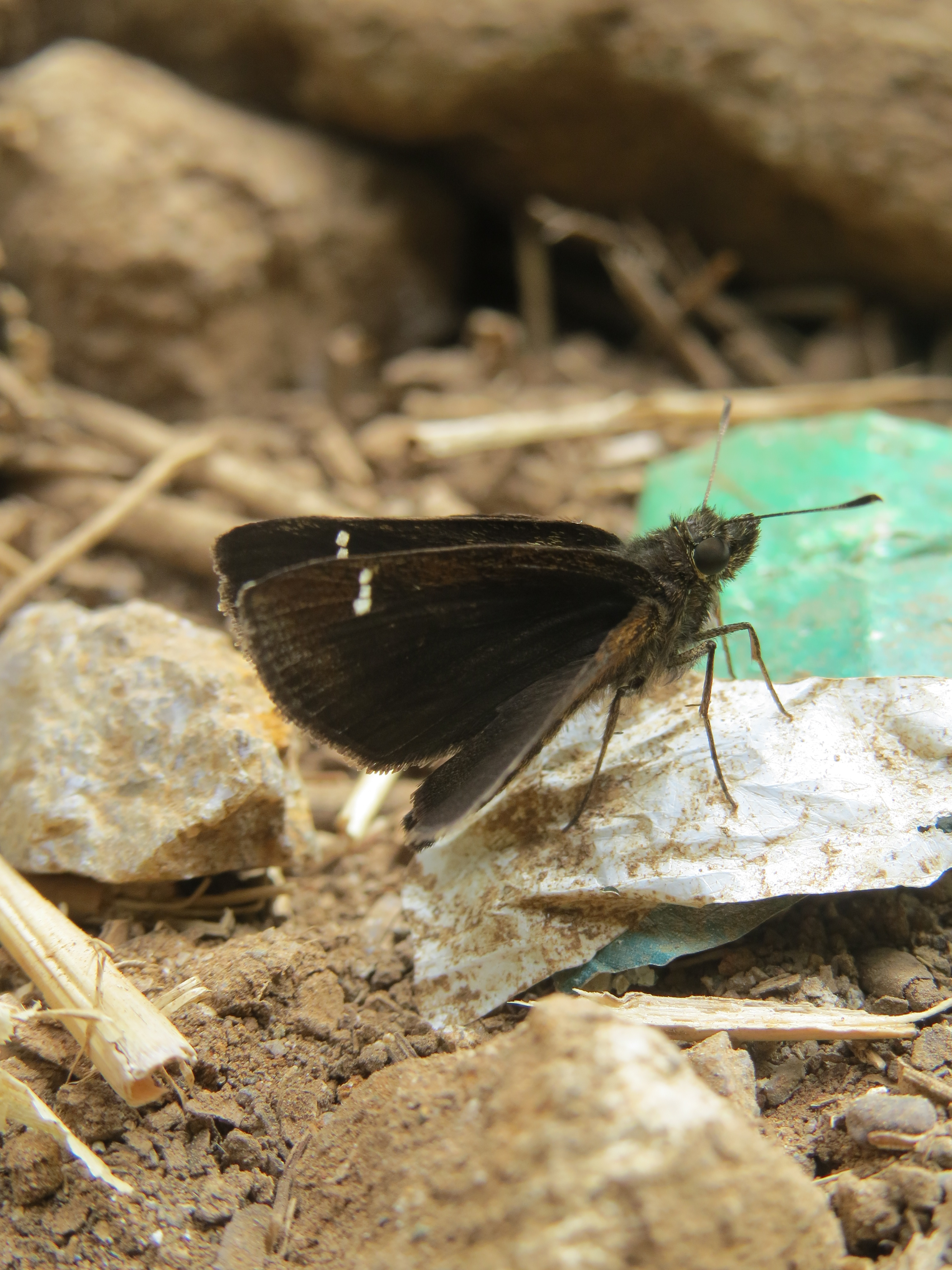
Ventral view

===== Arnetta vindhiana (Vindhyan bob) =====
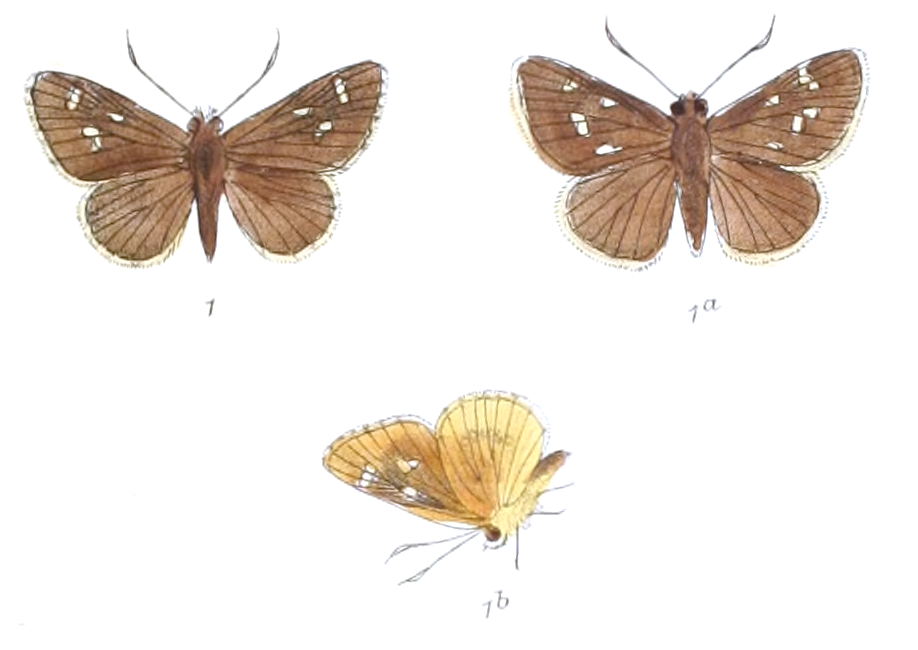
Illustration

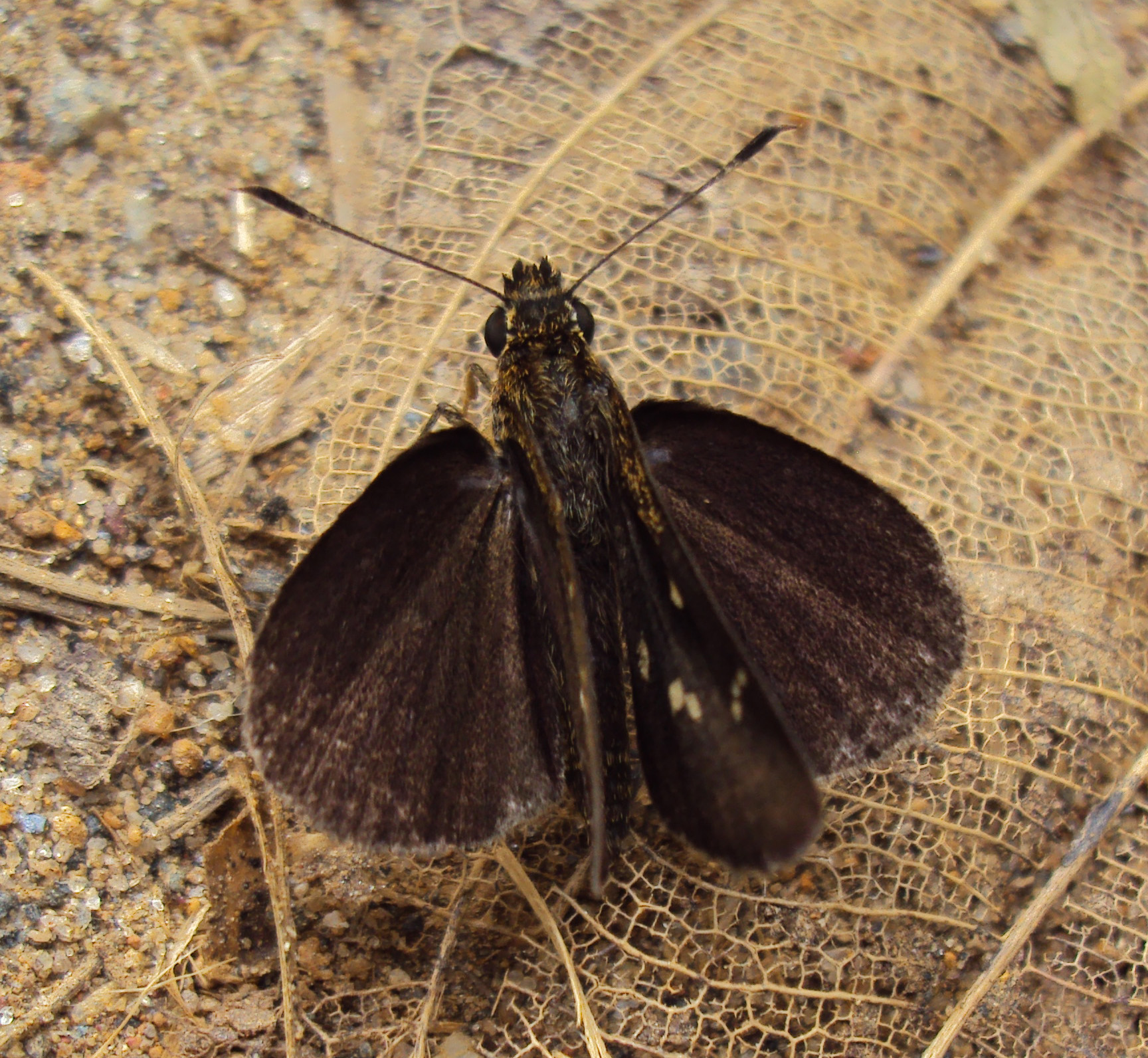
Dorsal view

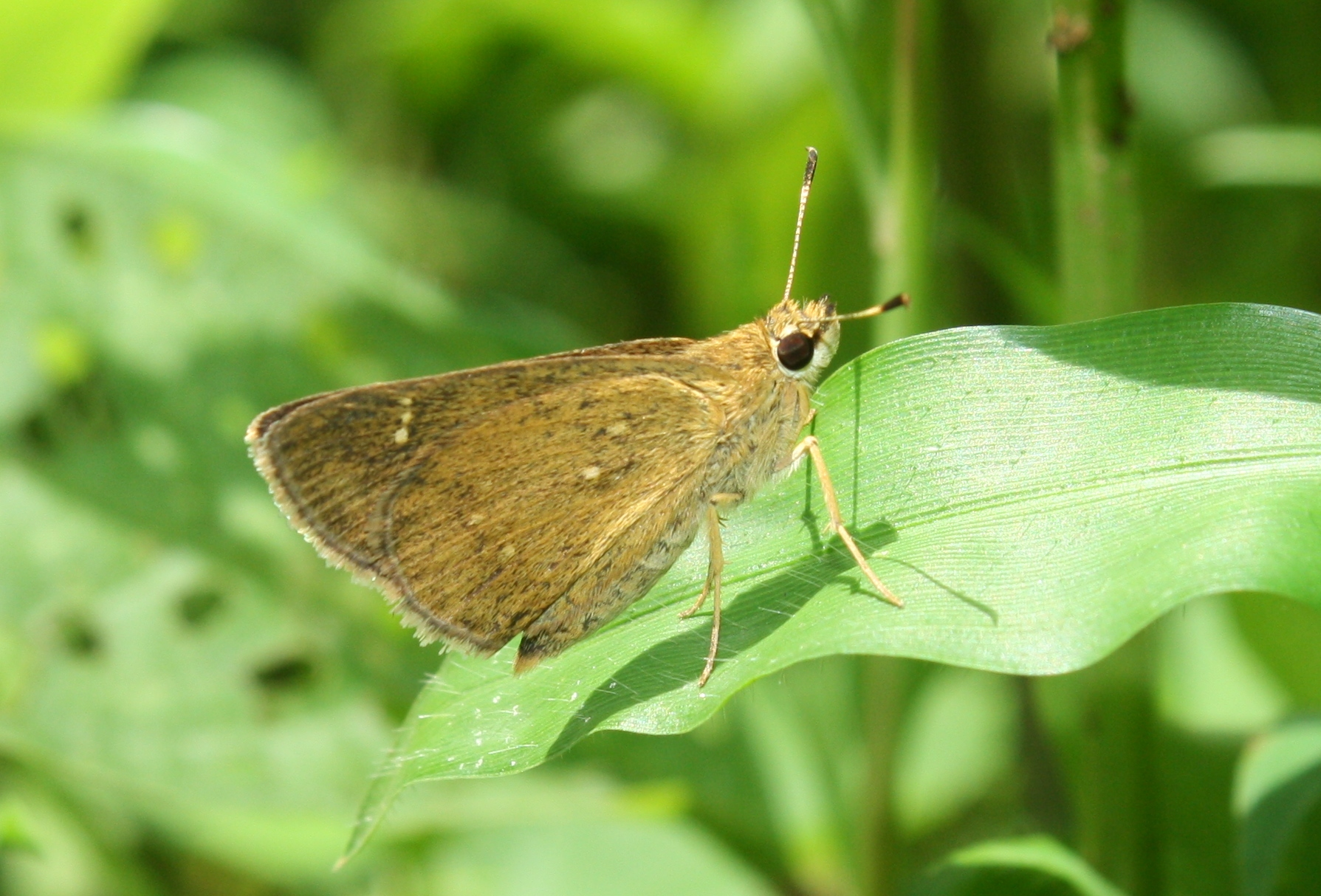
Ventral view

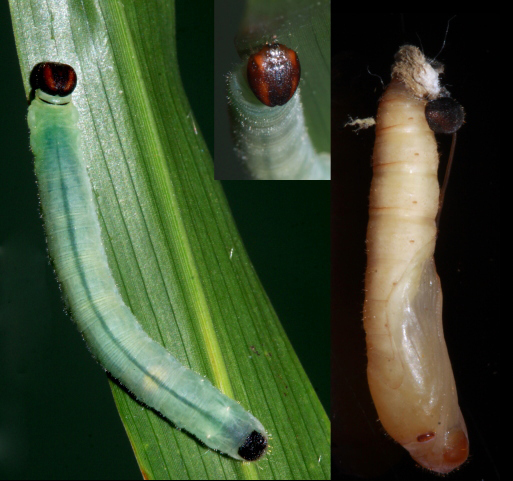
Larva and pupa

==== Genus: Baoris ====
===== Baoris farri (paintbrush swift) =====
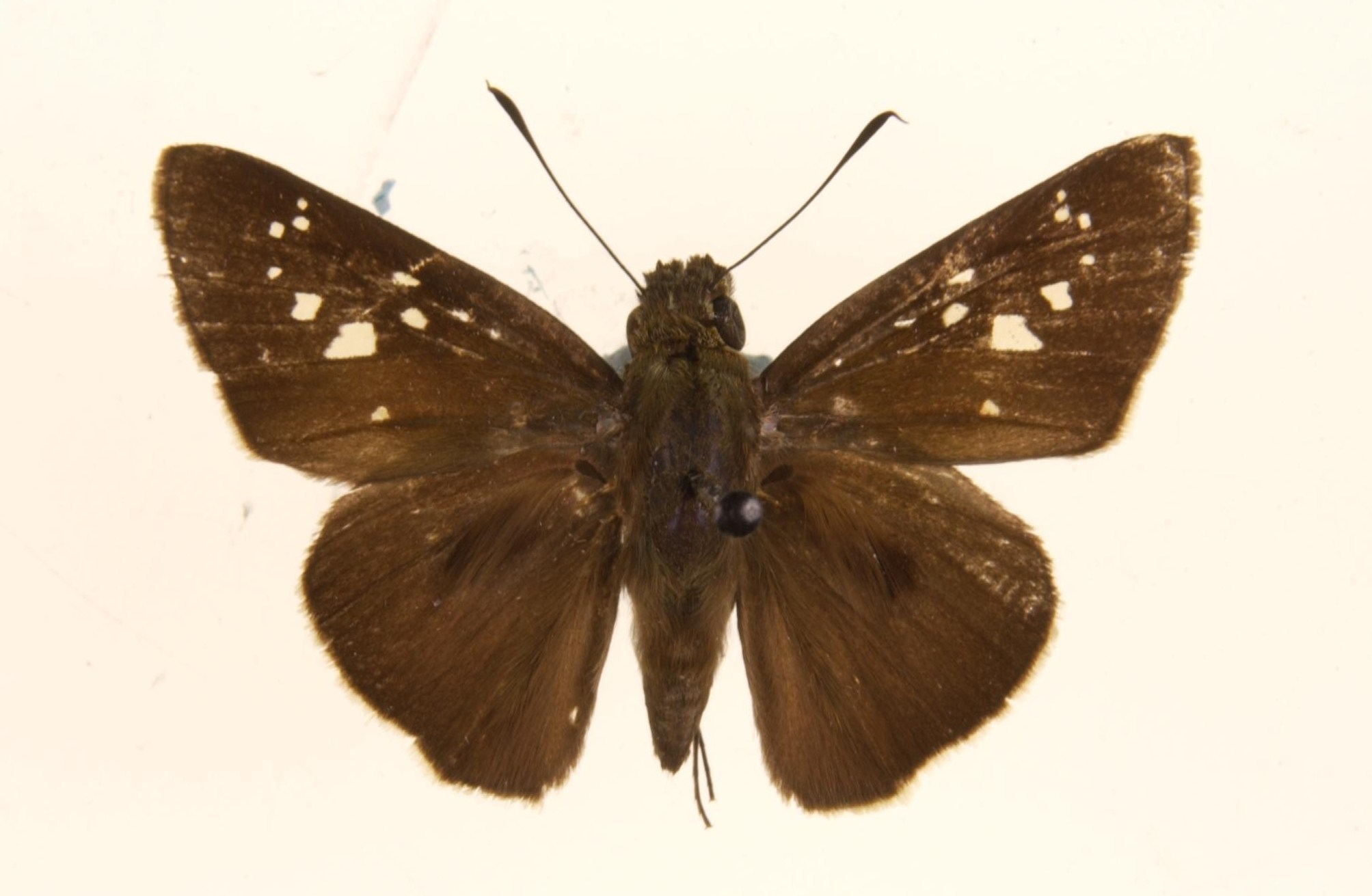
Museum specimen

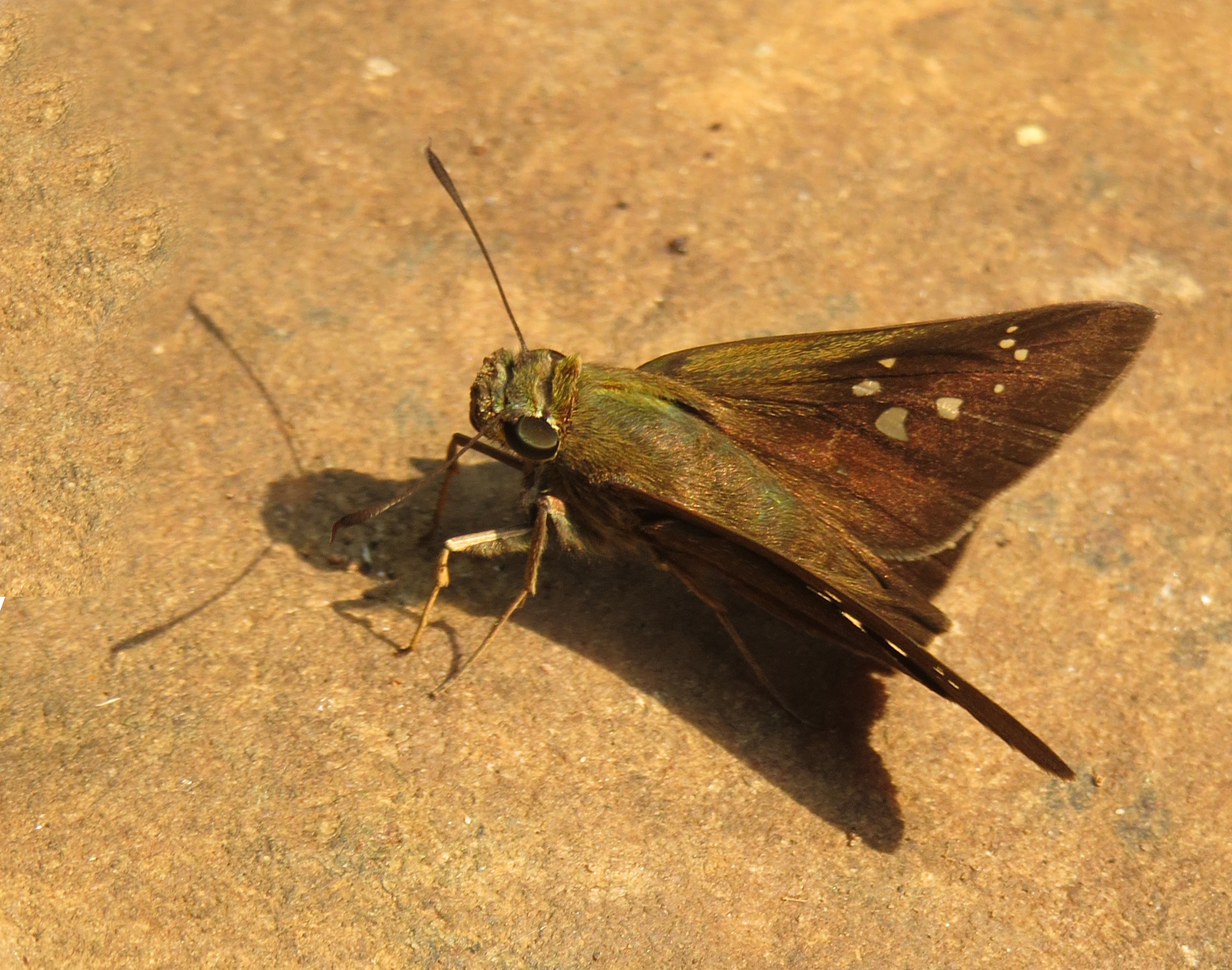
Dorsal view

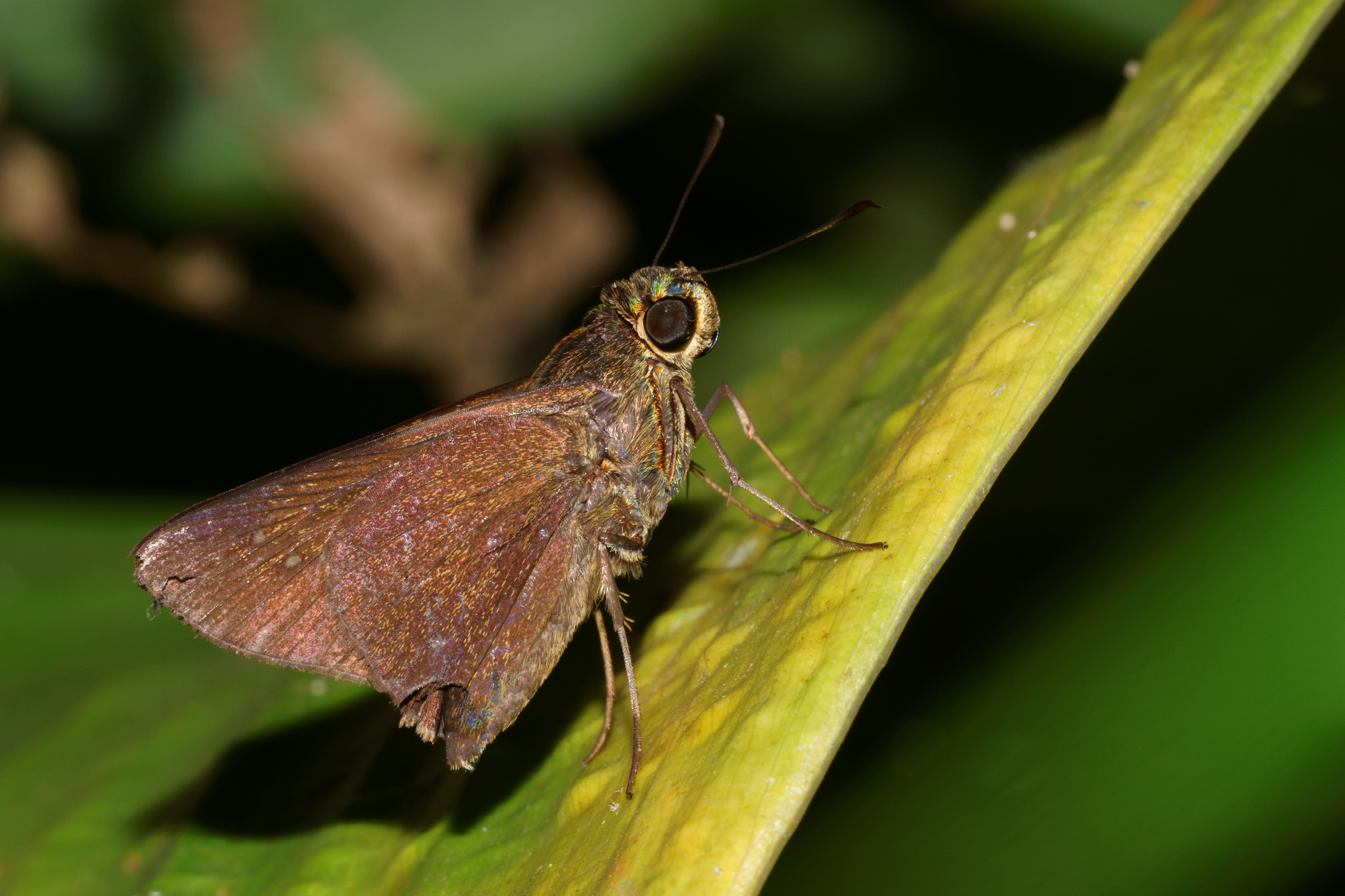
Ventral view

==== Genus: Baracus ====
===== Baracus vittatus (hedge hopper) =====
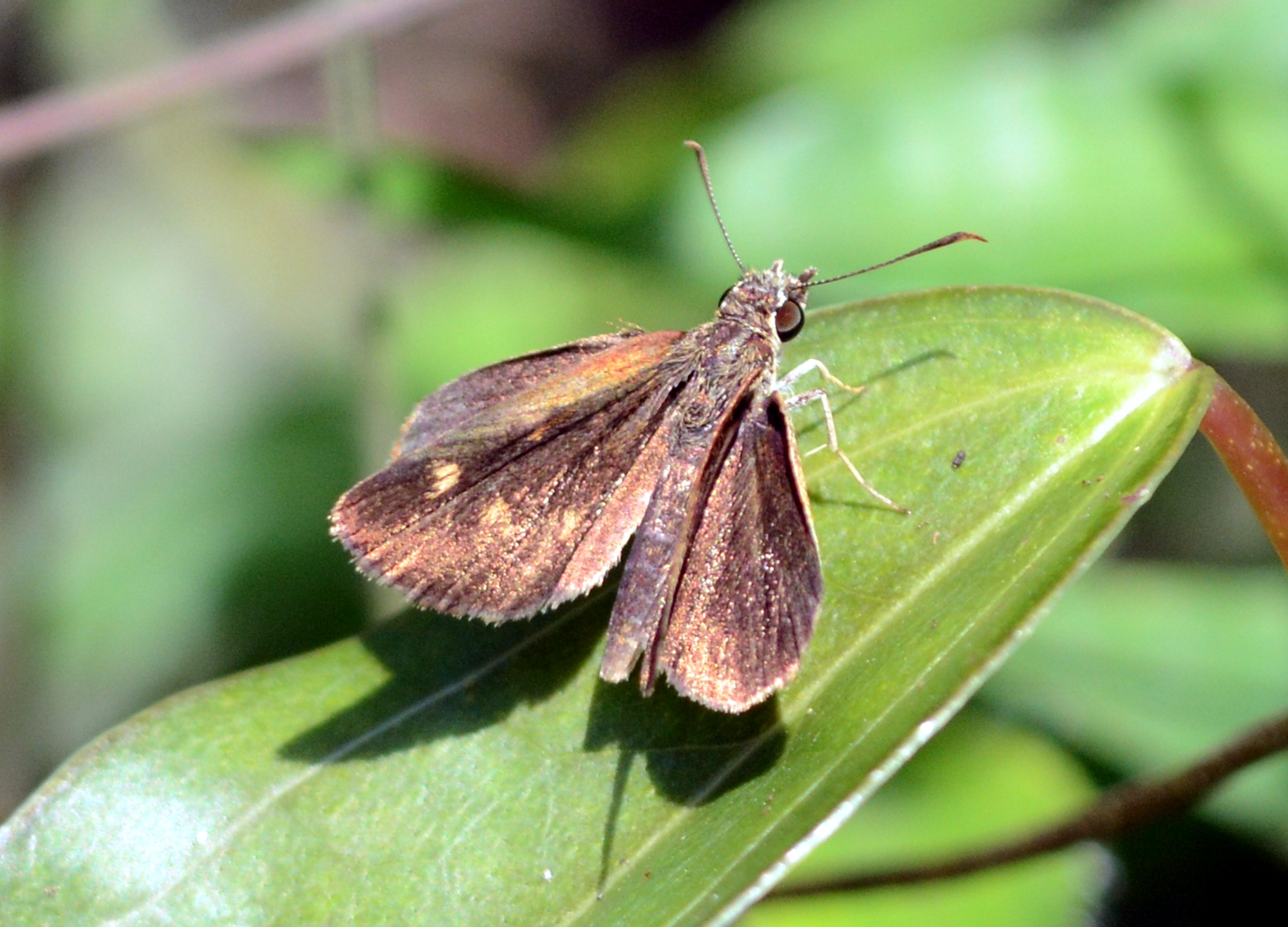
Dorsal view

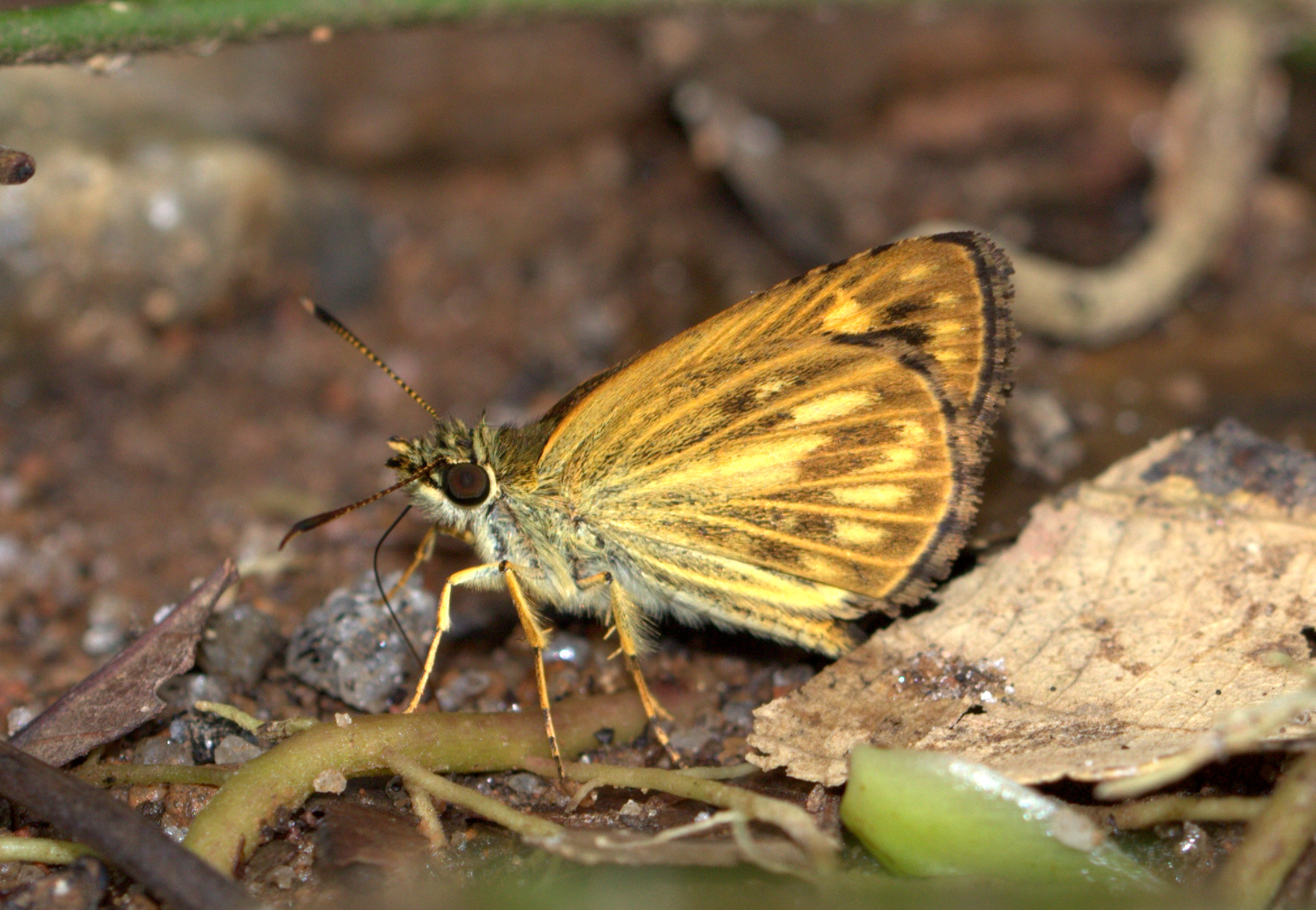
Ventral view

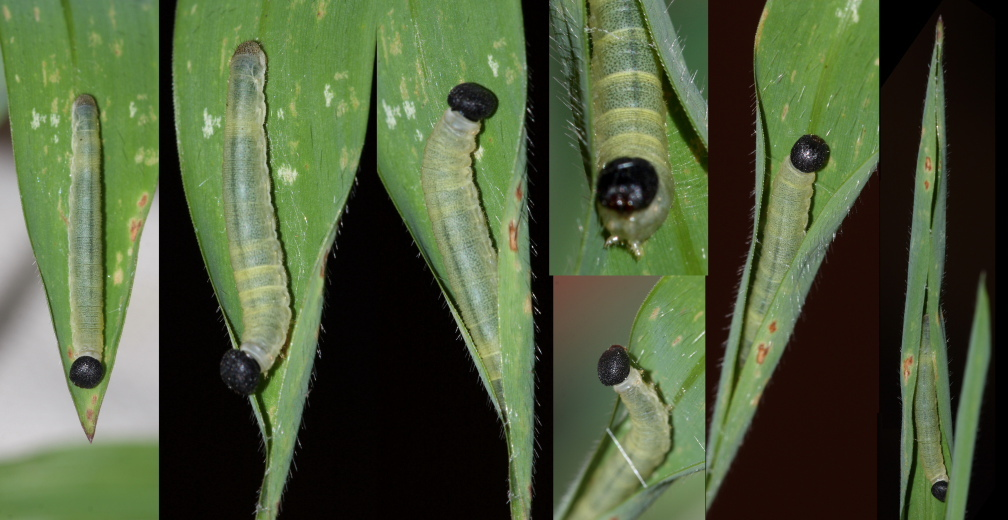
Larva

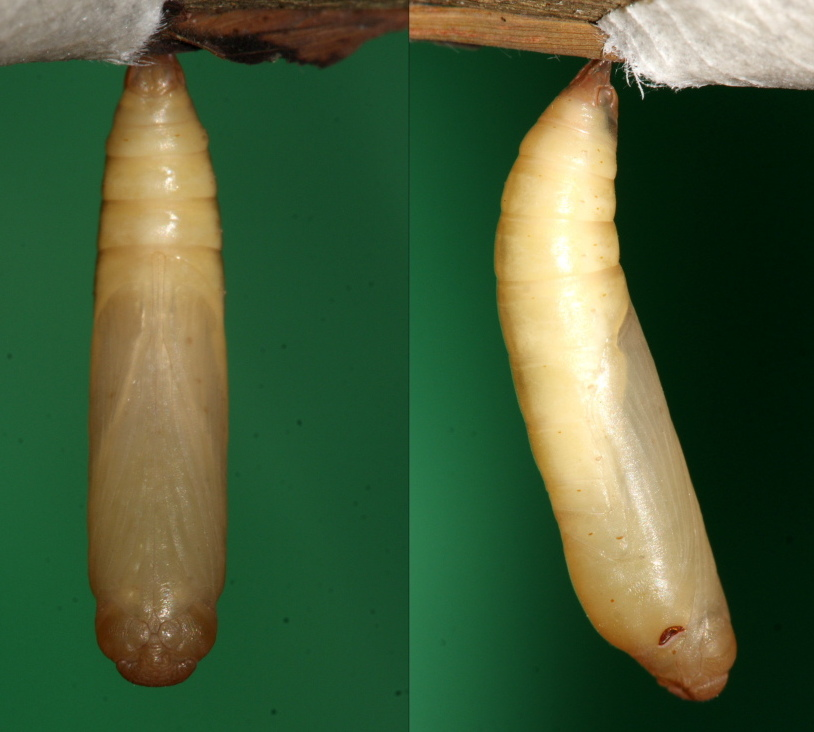
Pupa

==== Genus: Borbo ====
===== Borbo bevani (Beavan's swift) =====
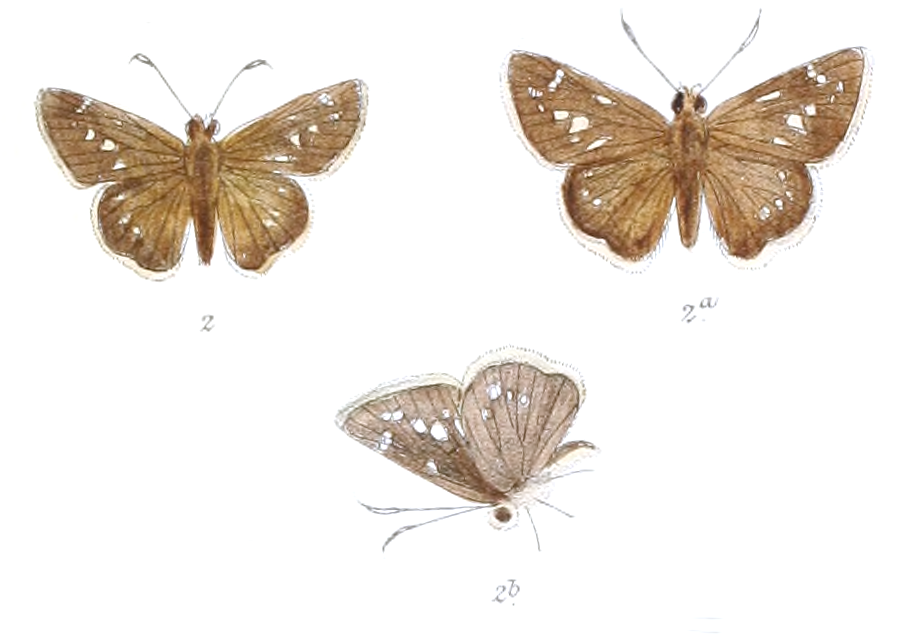
Illustration

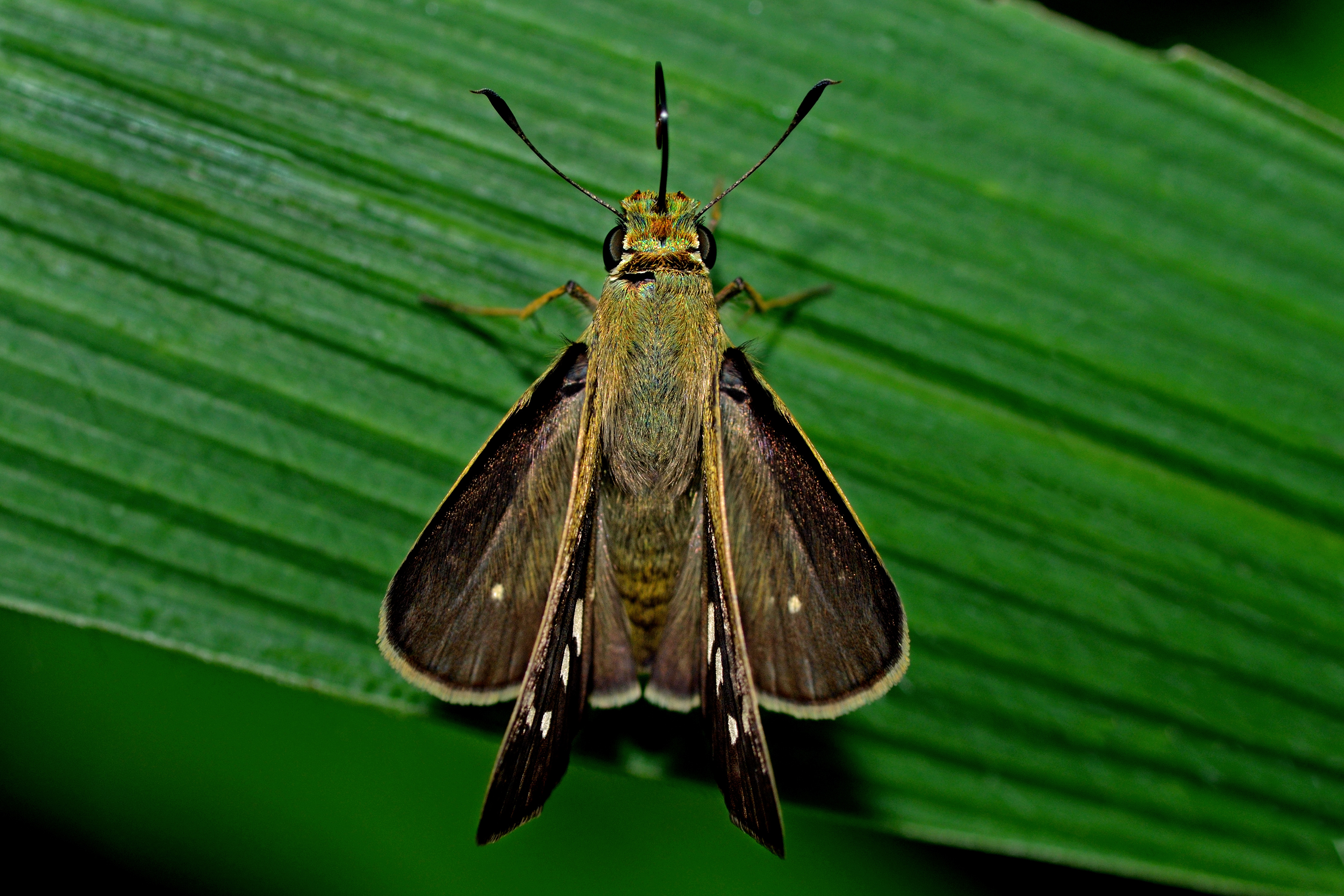
Dorsal view

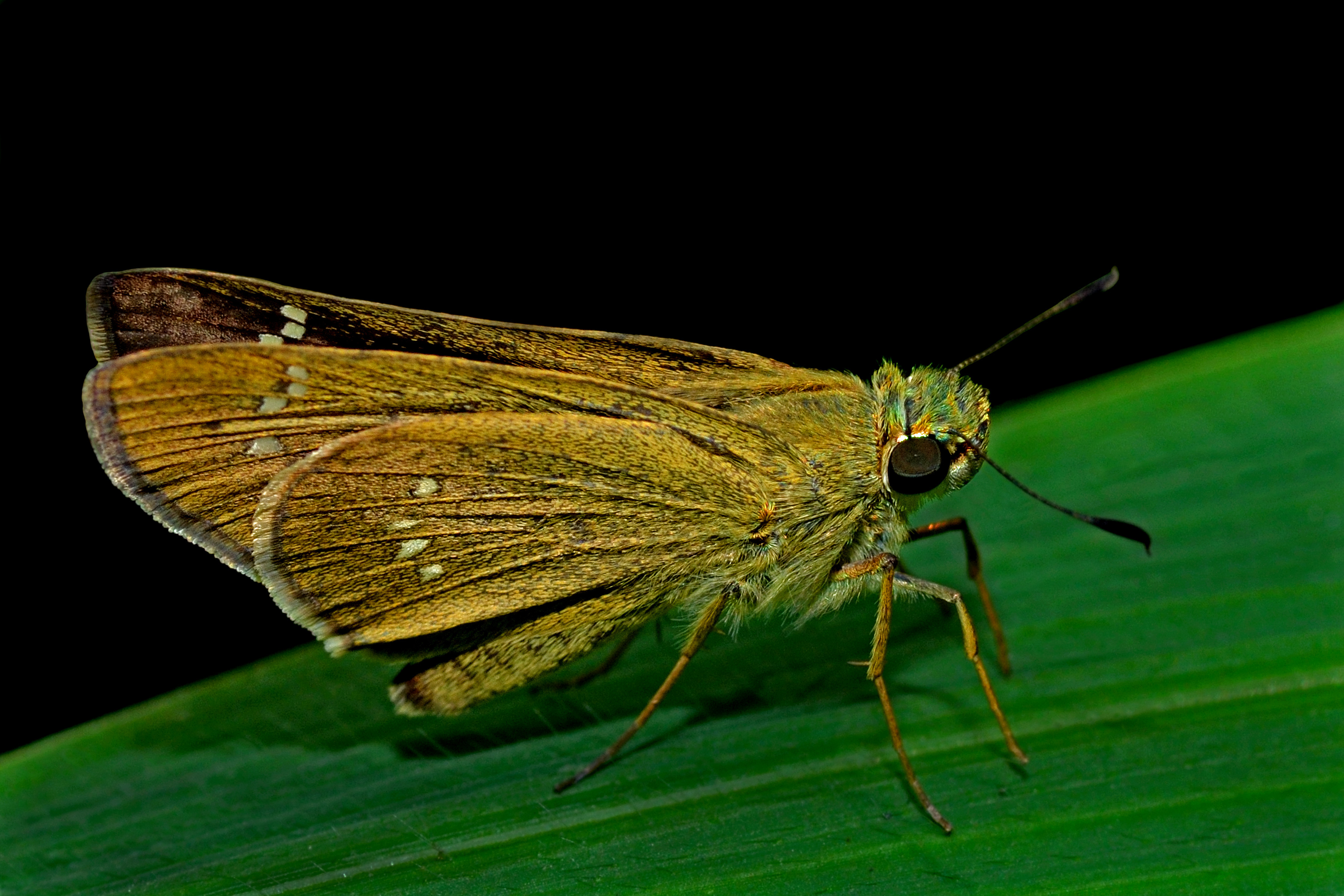
Ventral view

===== Borbo cinnara (rice swift) =====
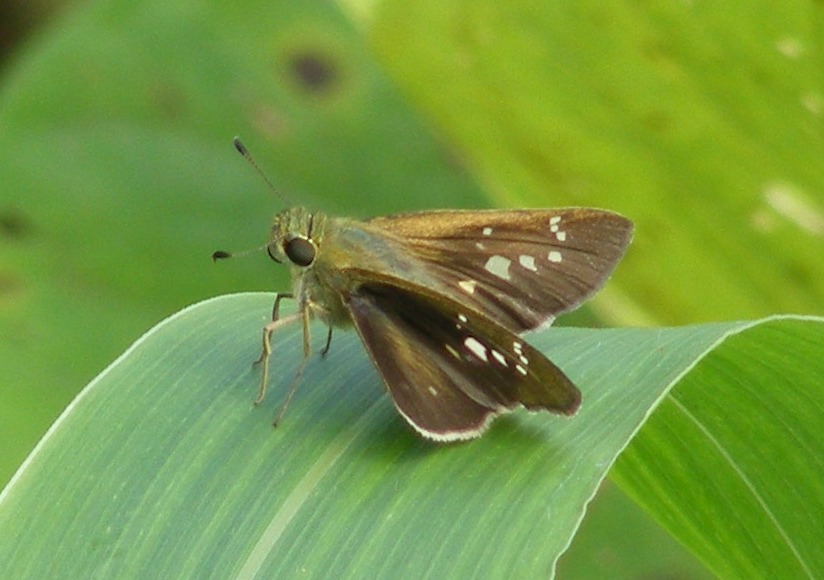
Dorsal view

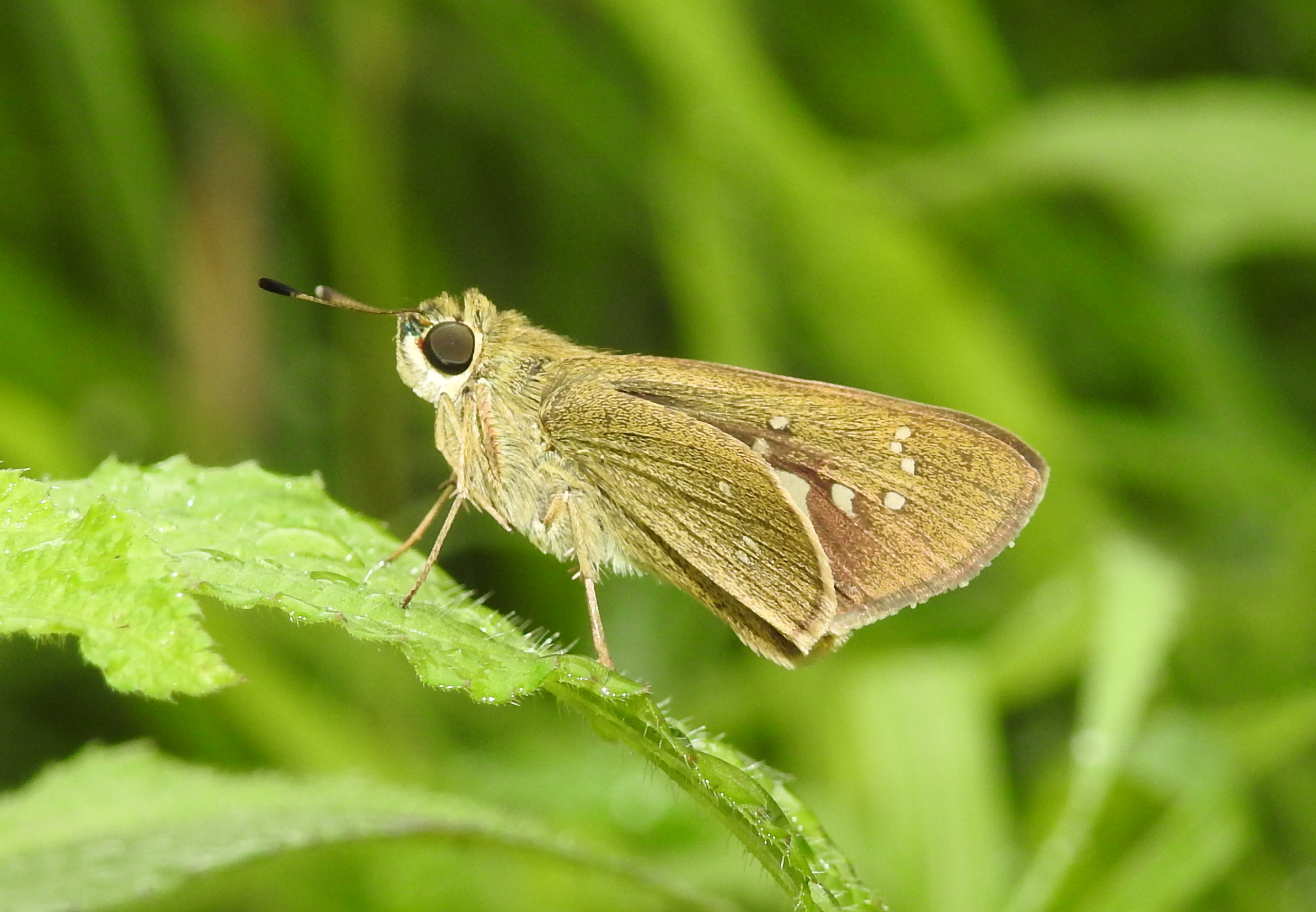
Ventral view

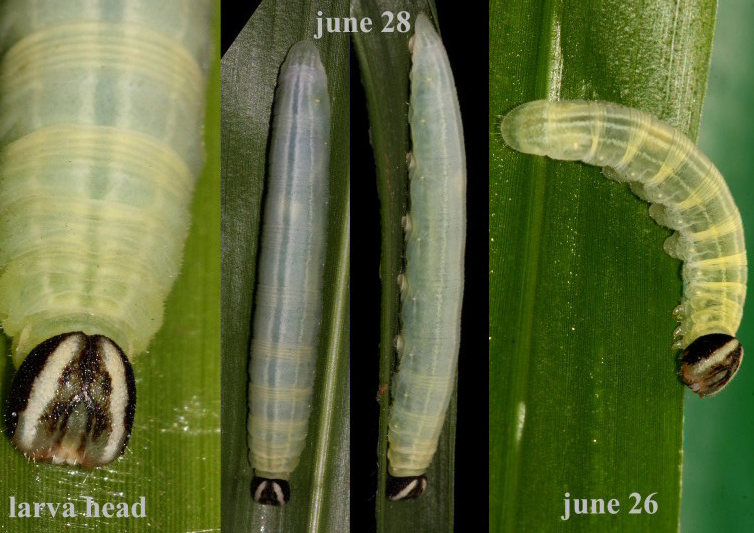
Larva

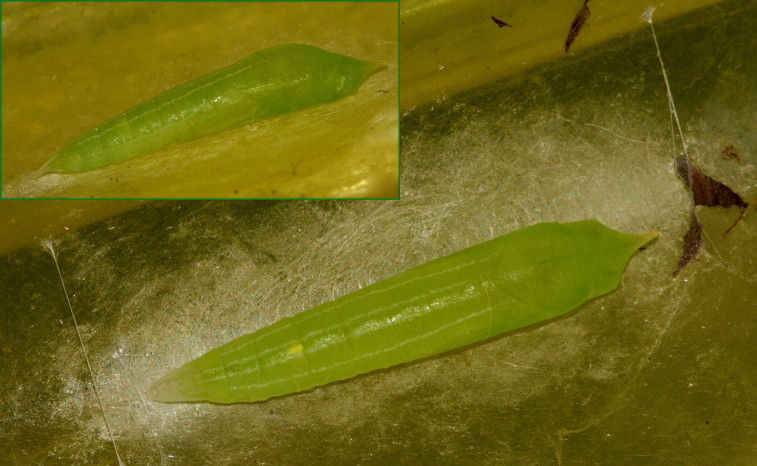
Pupa

==== Genus: Caltoris ====
===== Caltoris canaraica (Kanara swift) =====
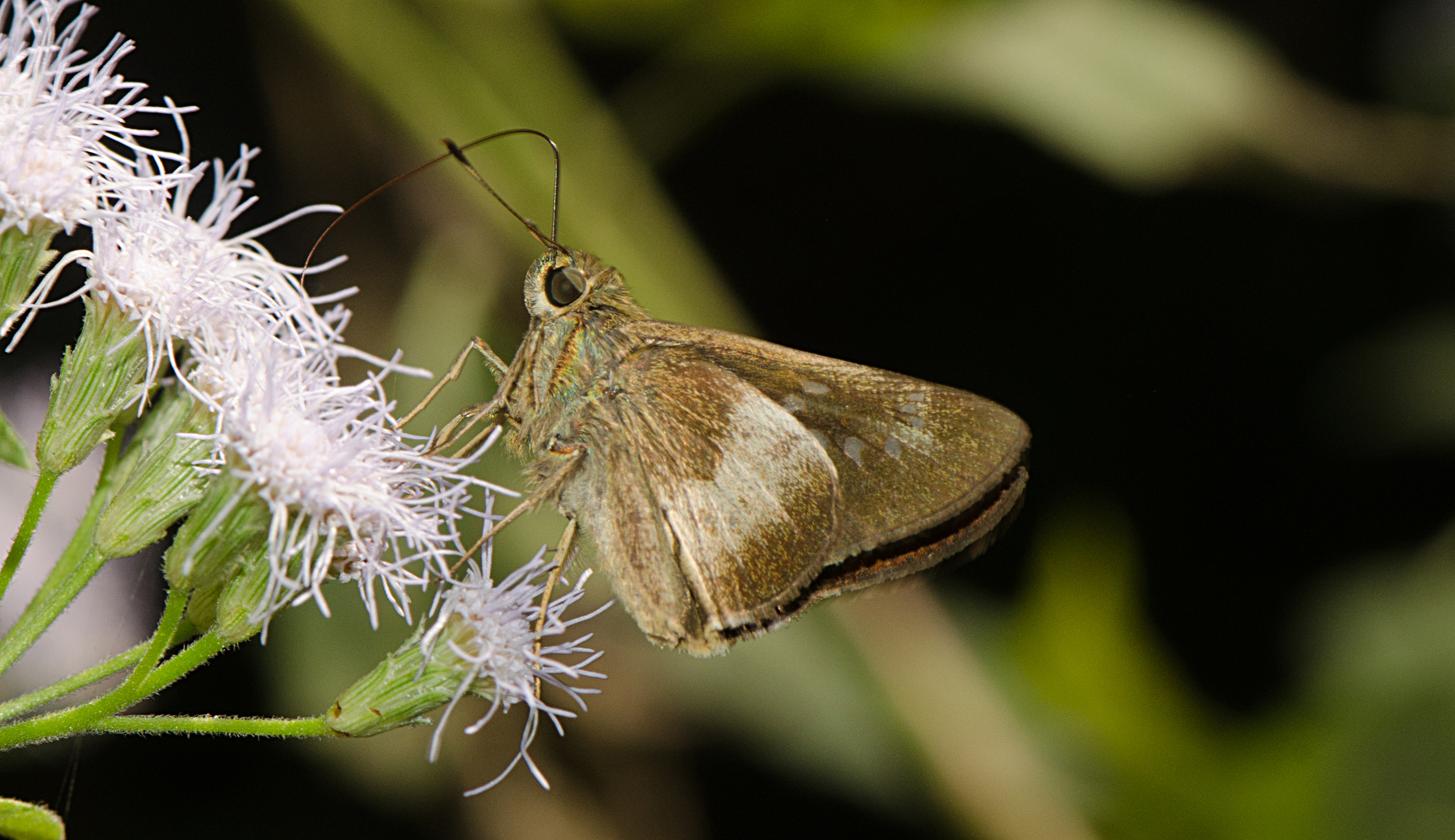
Ventral view

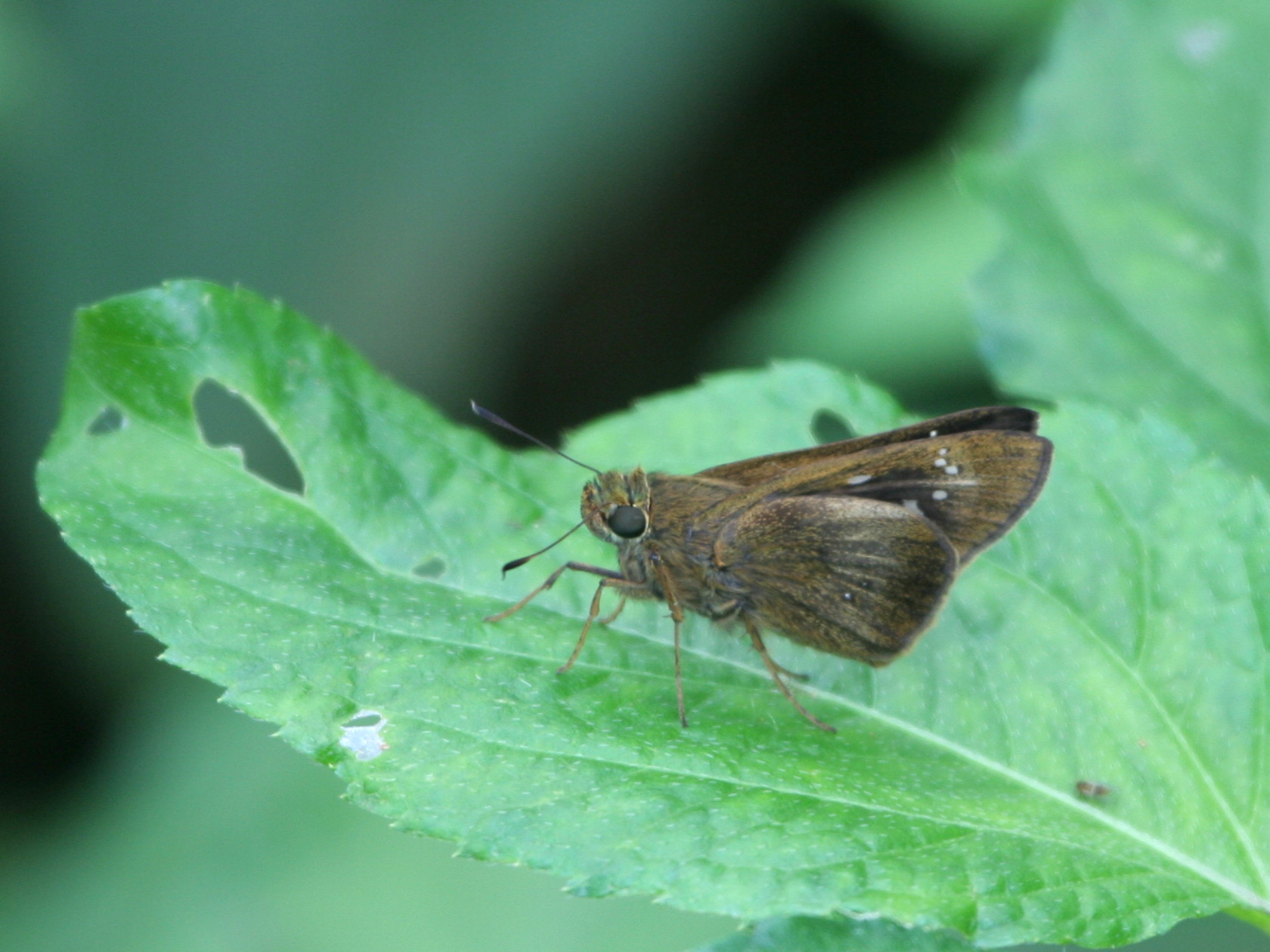
Ventral view

===== Caltoris kumara (blank swift) =====
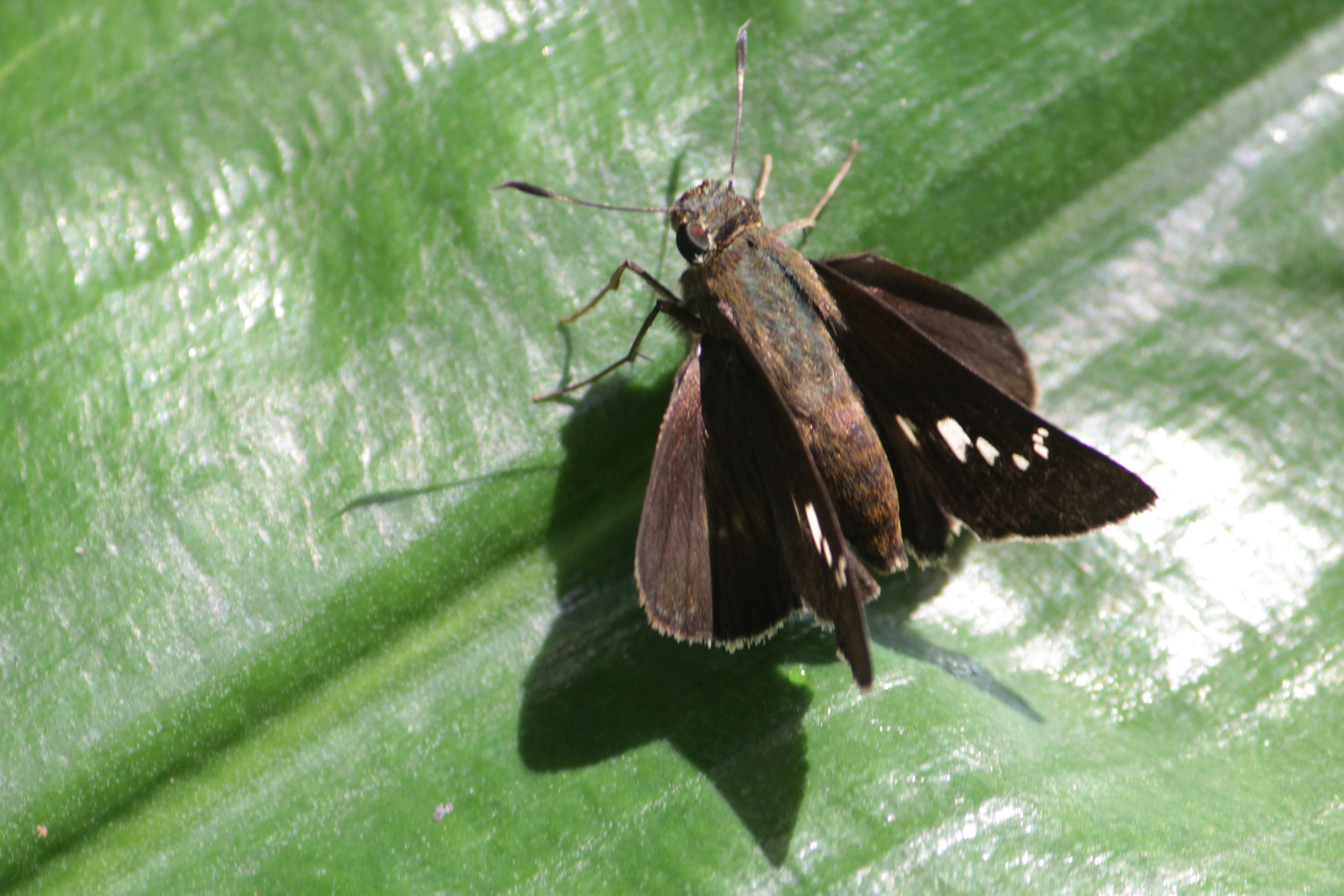
Dorsal view

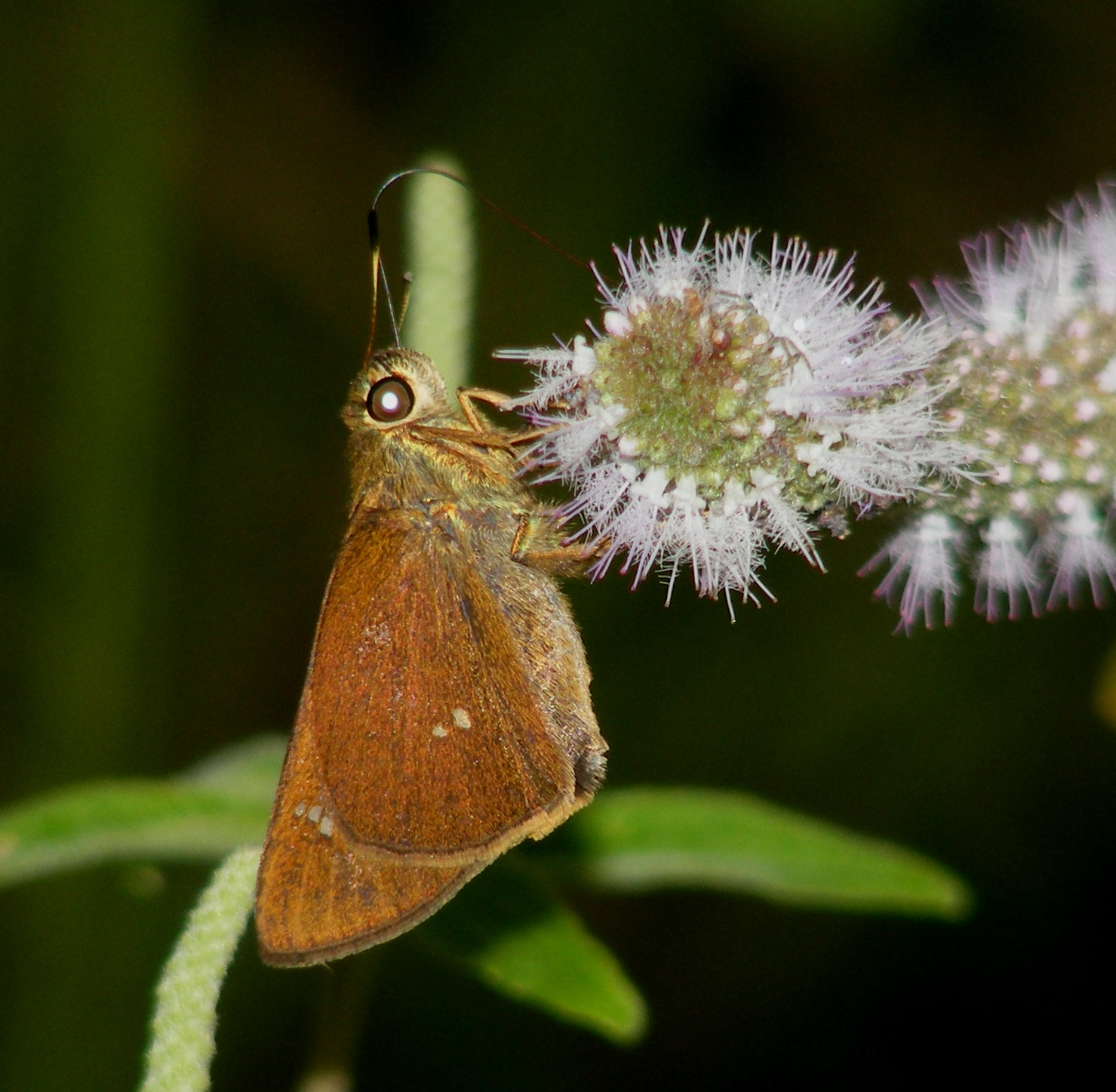
Ventral view

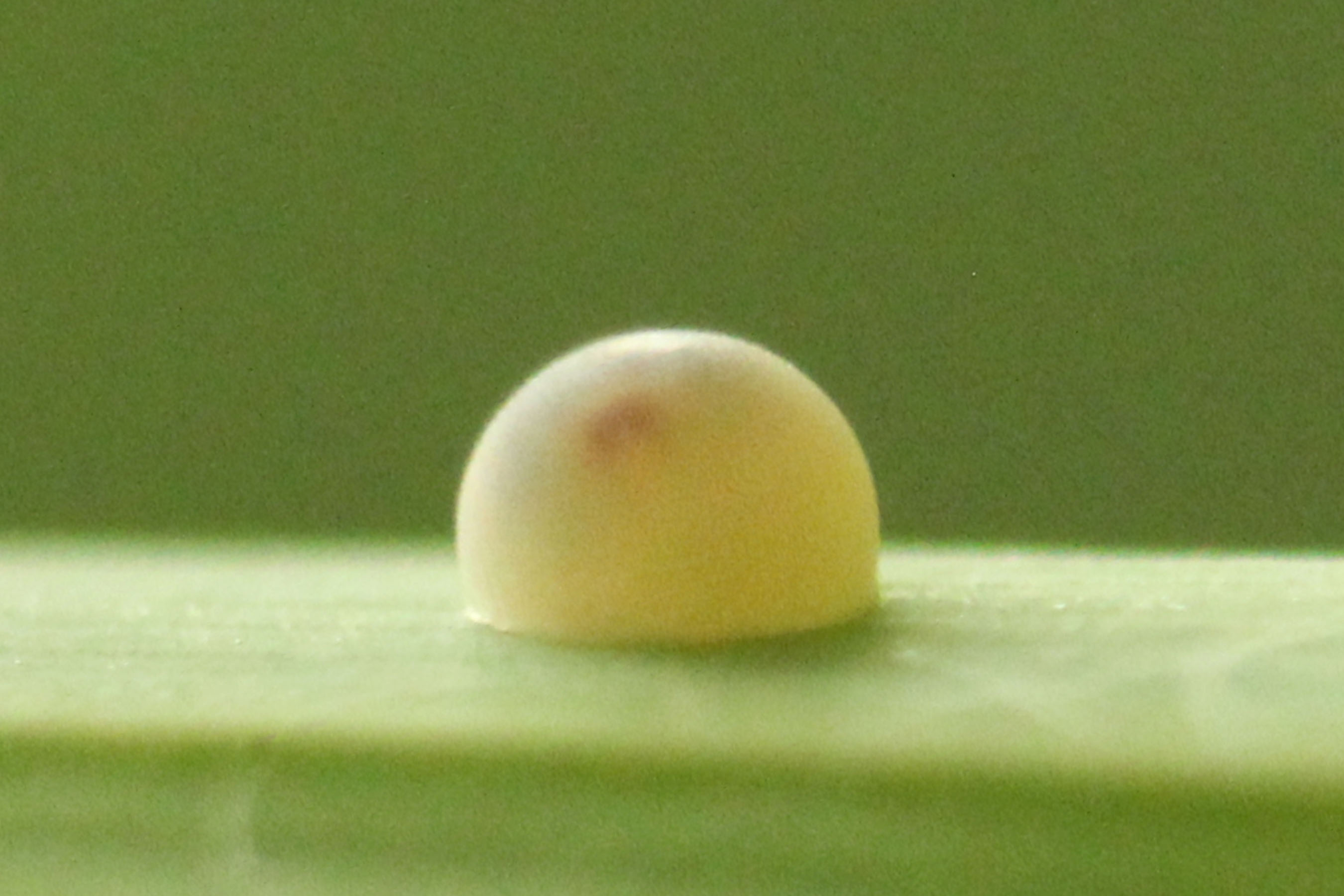
Egg

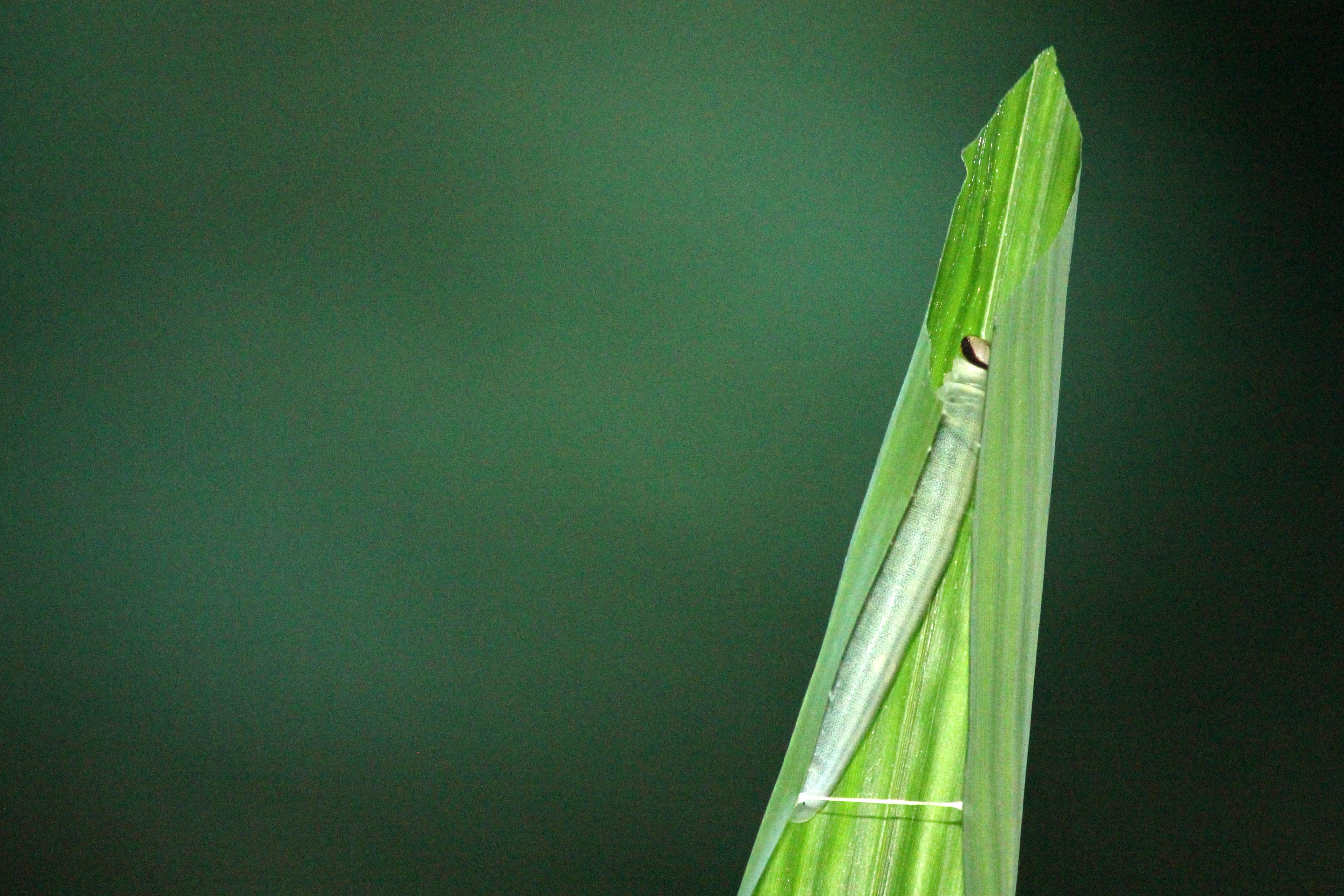
Larva

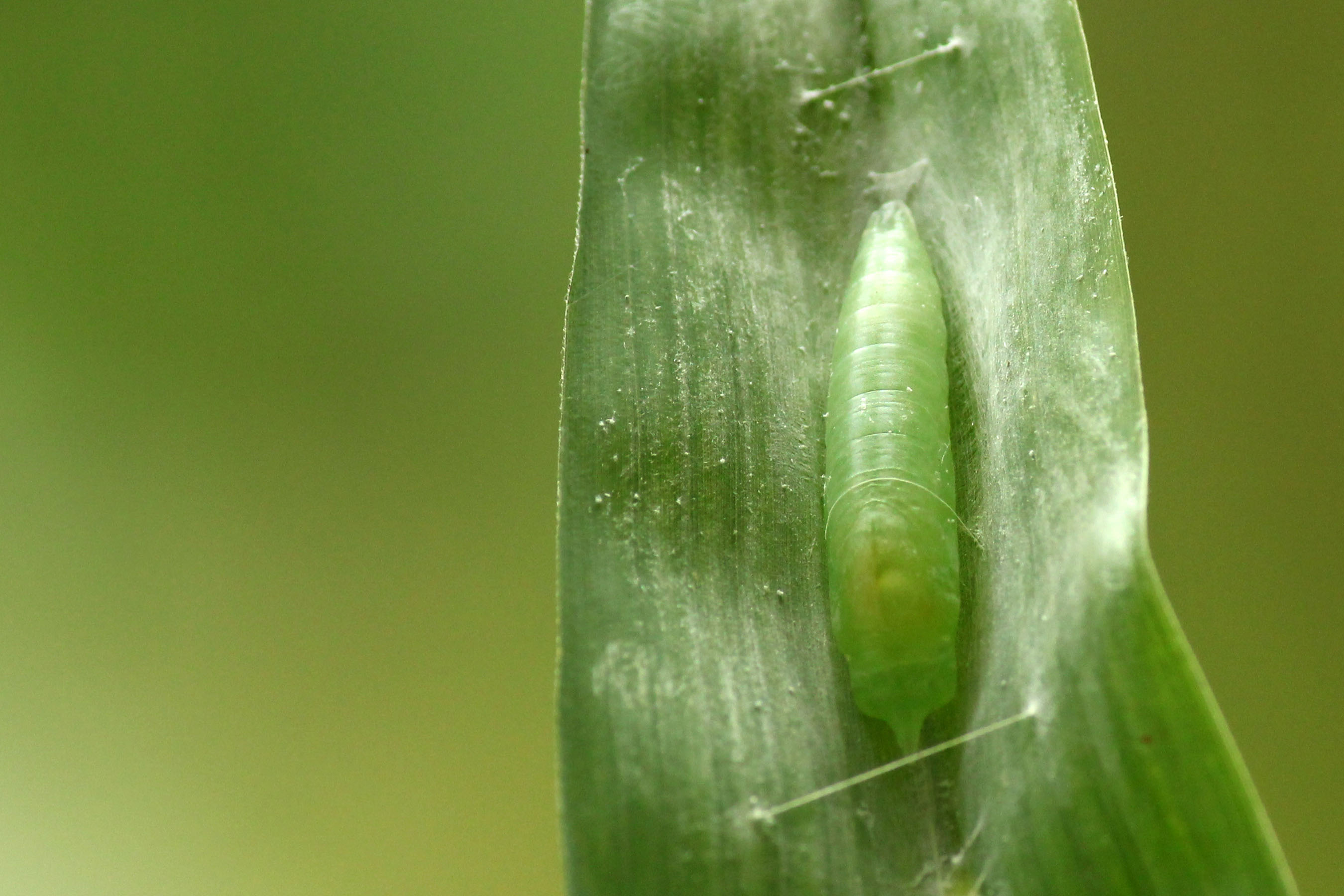
Pupa

===== Caltoris philippina (Philippine swift) =====
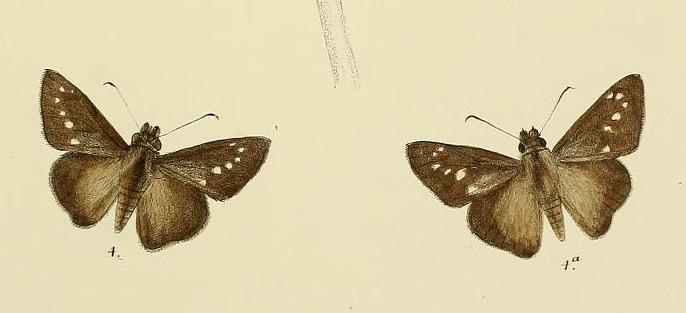
Illustration

==== Genus: Cephrenes ====
===== Cephrenes acalle (plain palm dart) =====
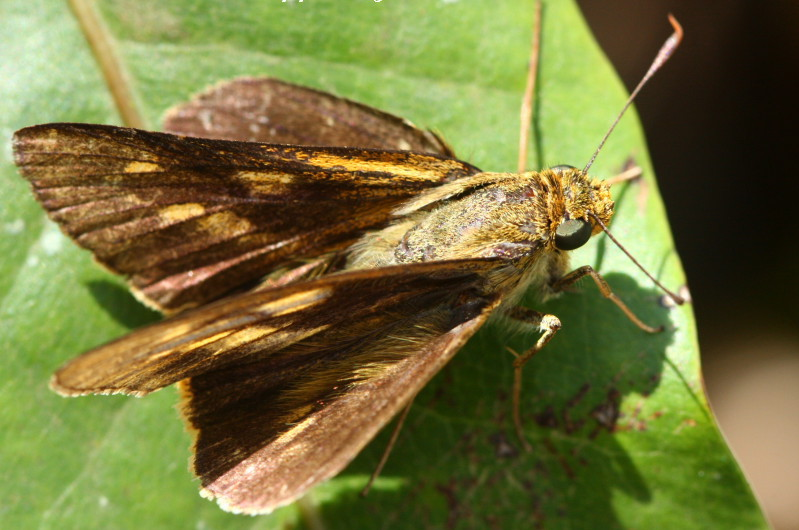
Dorsal view

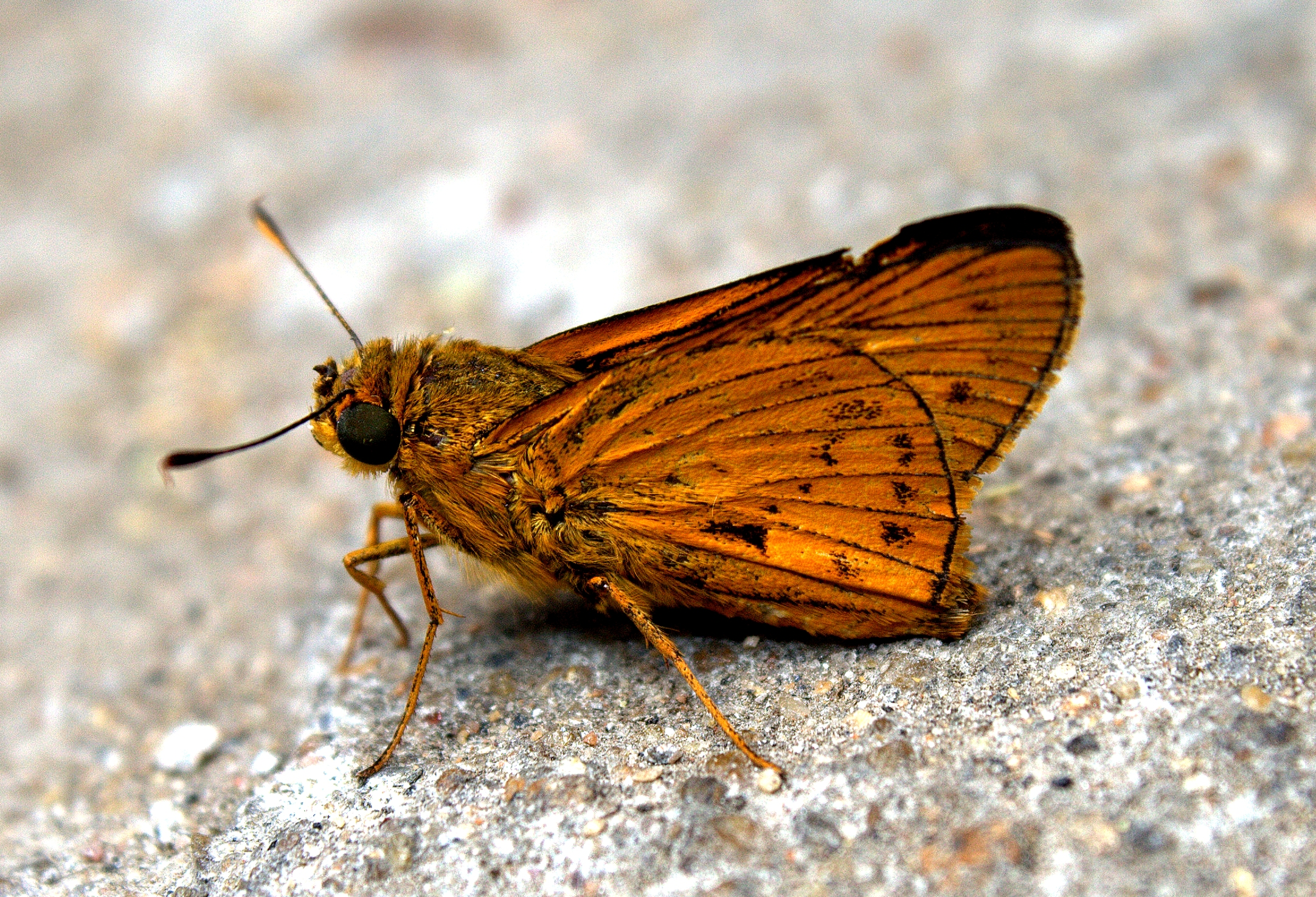
Ventral view

==== Genus: Cupitha ====
===== Cupitha purreea (wax dart) =====
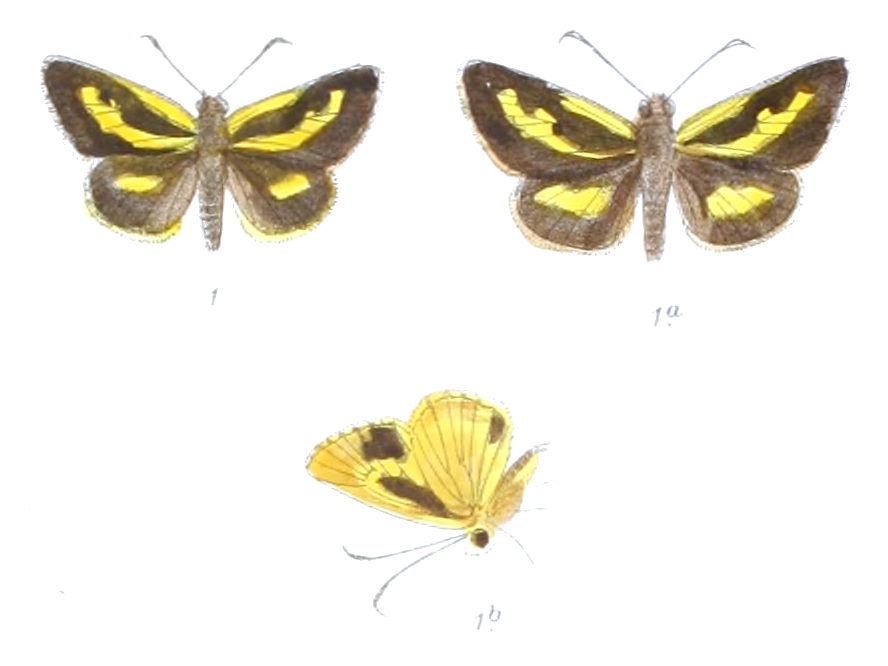
Illustration

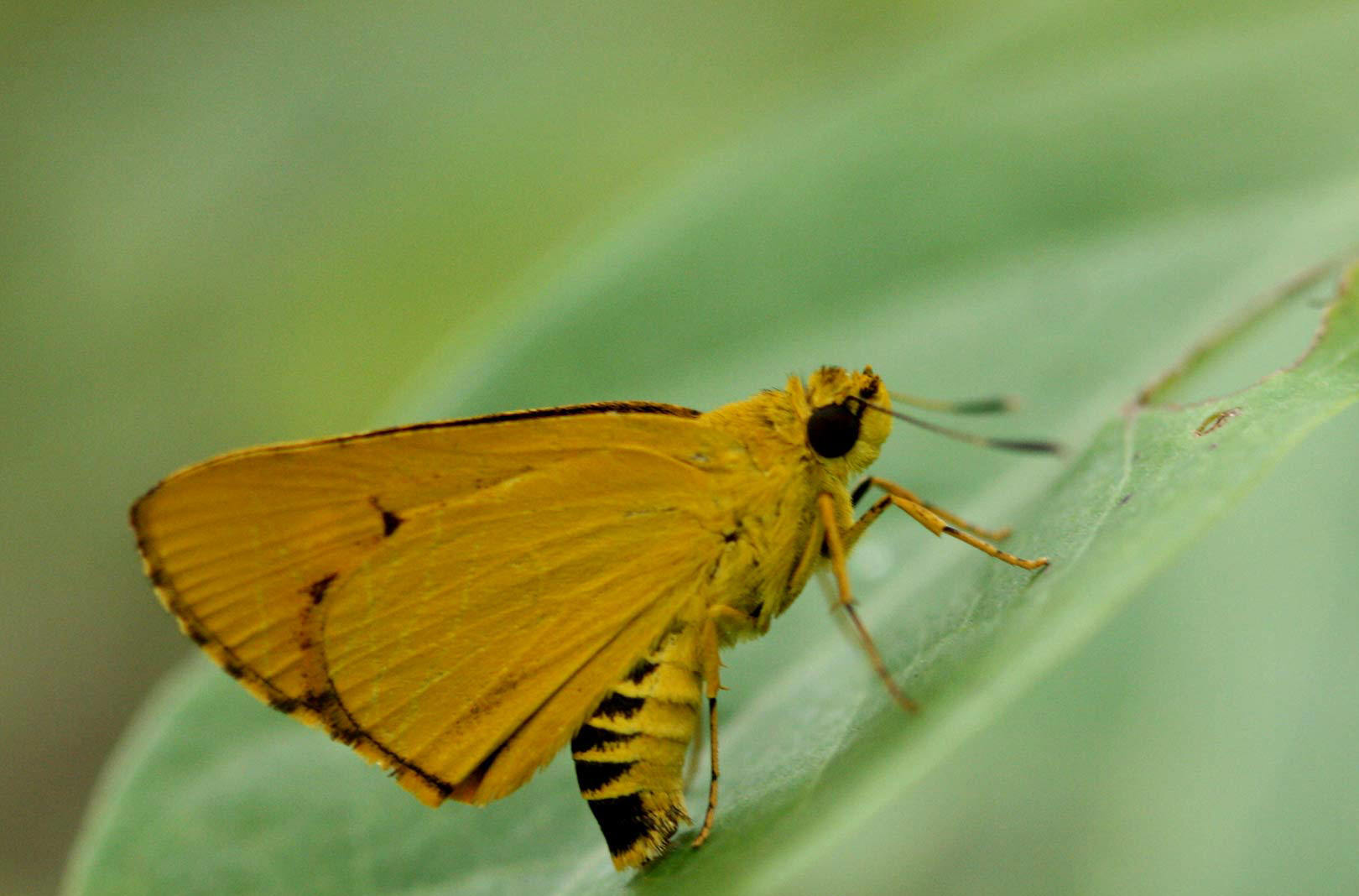
Ventral view

==== Genus: Erionota ====
===== Erionota torus (rounded palm-redeye) =====
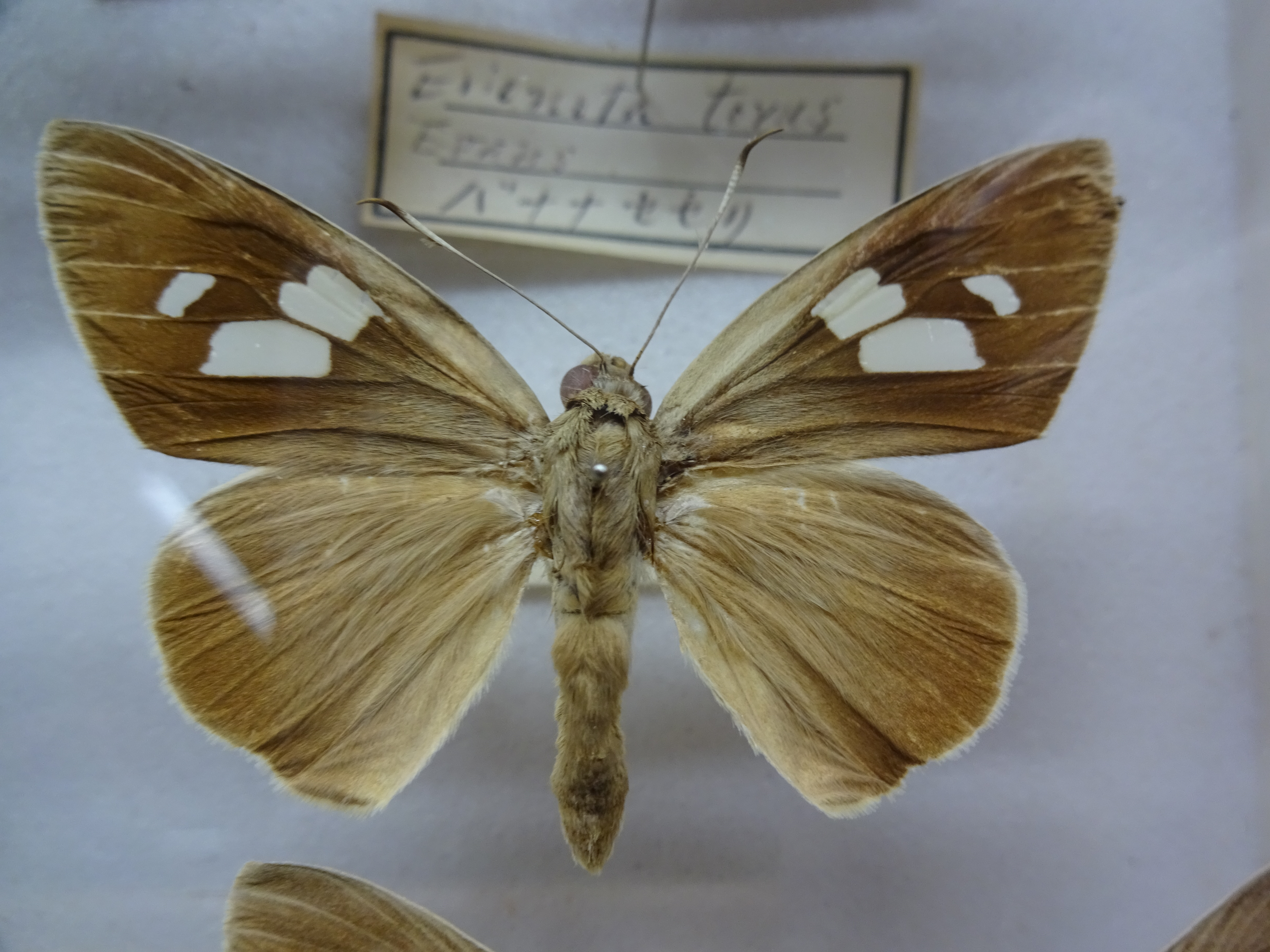
Museum specimen

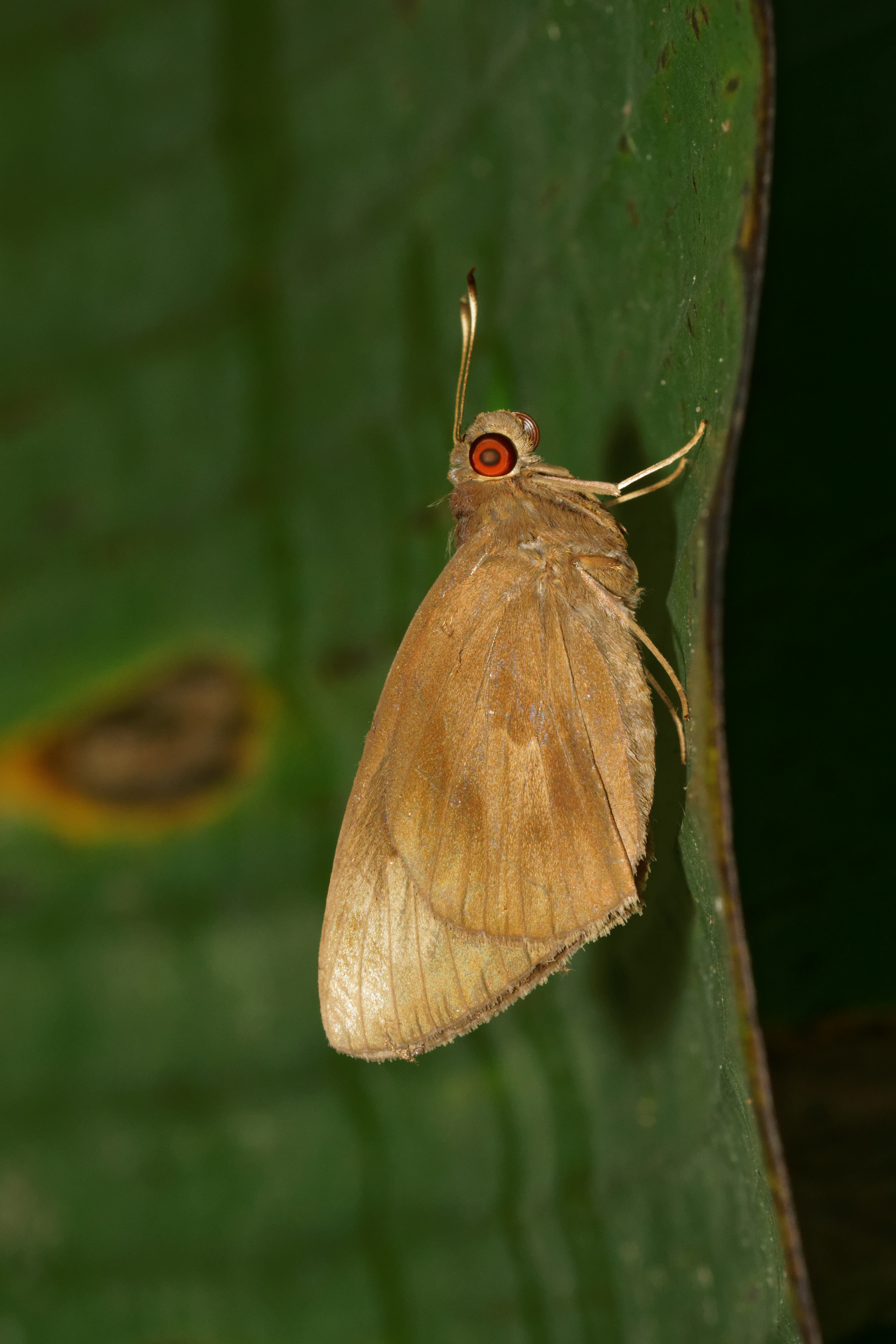
Ventral view

==== Genus: Gangara ====
===== Gangara thyrsis (giant redeye) =====
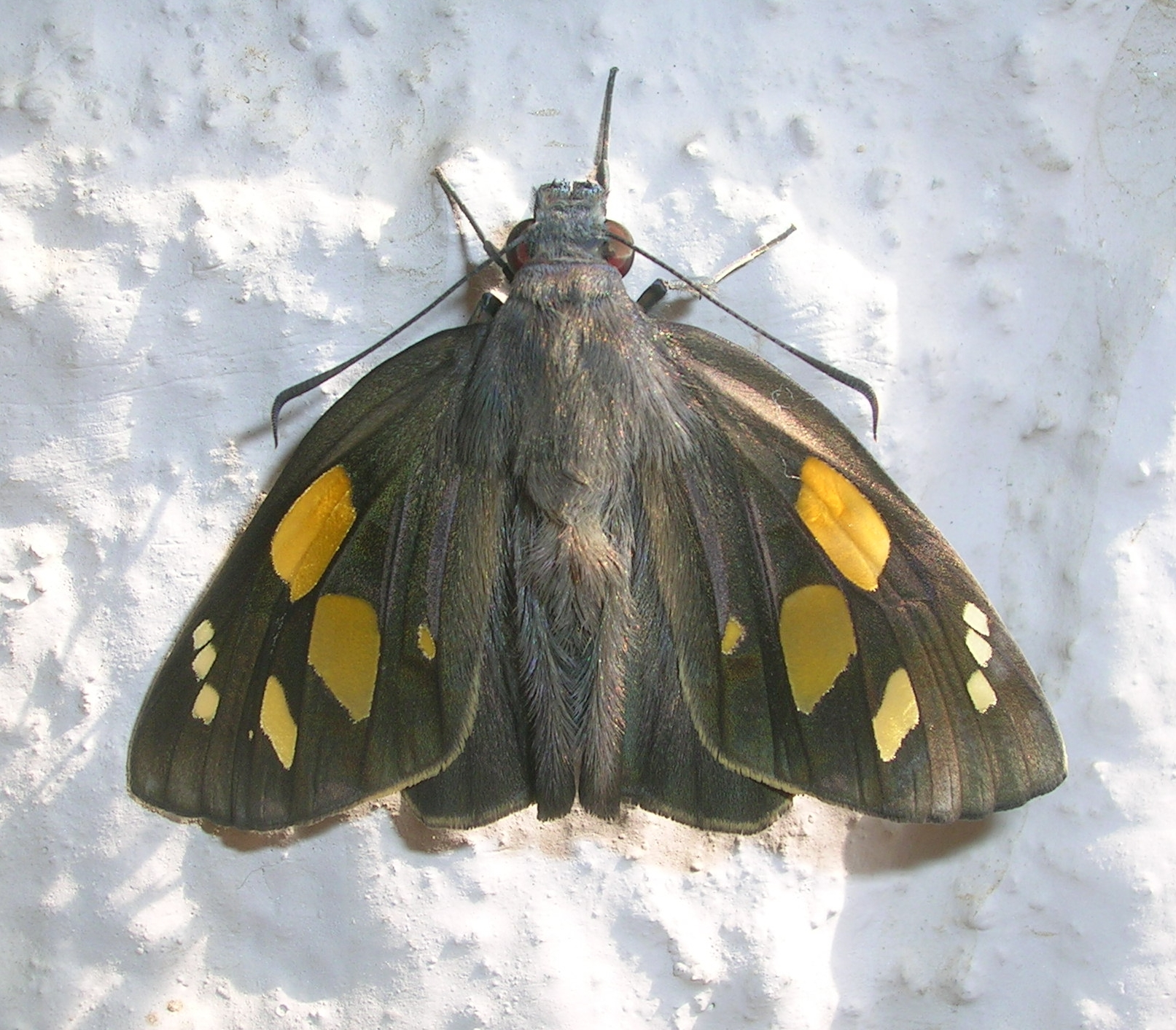
Dorsal view

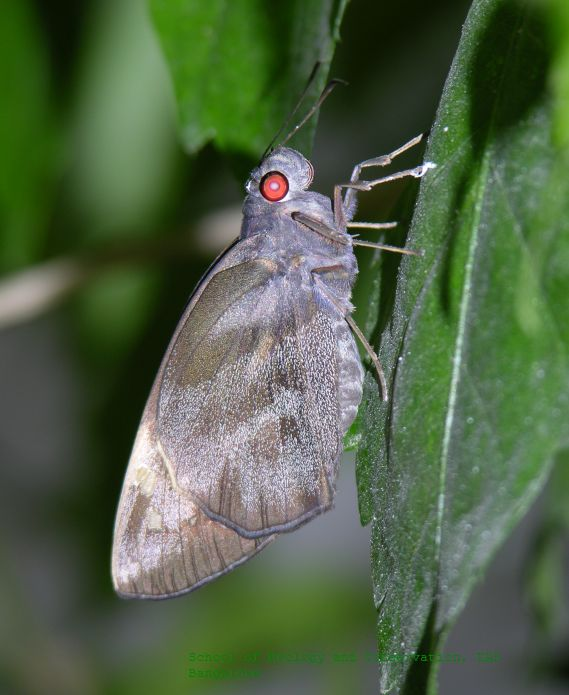
Ventral view

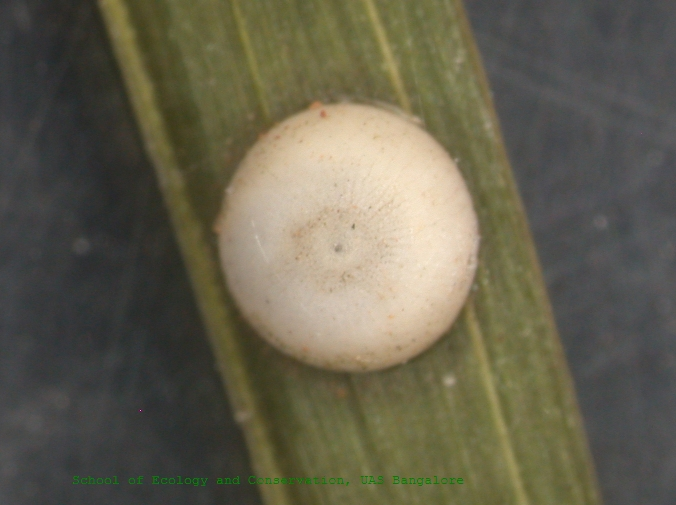
Egg

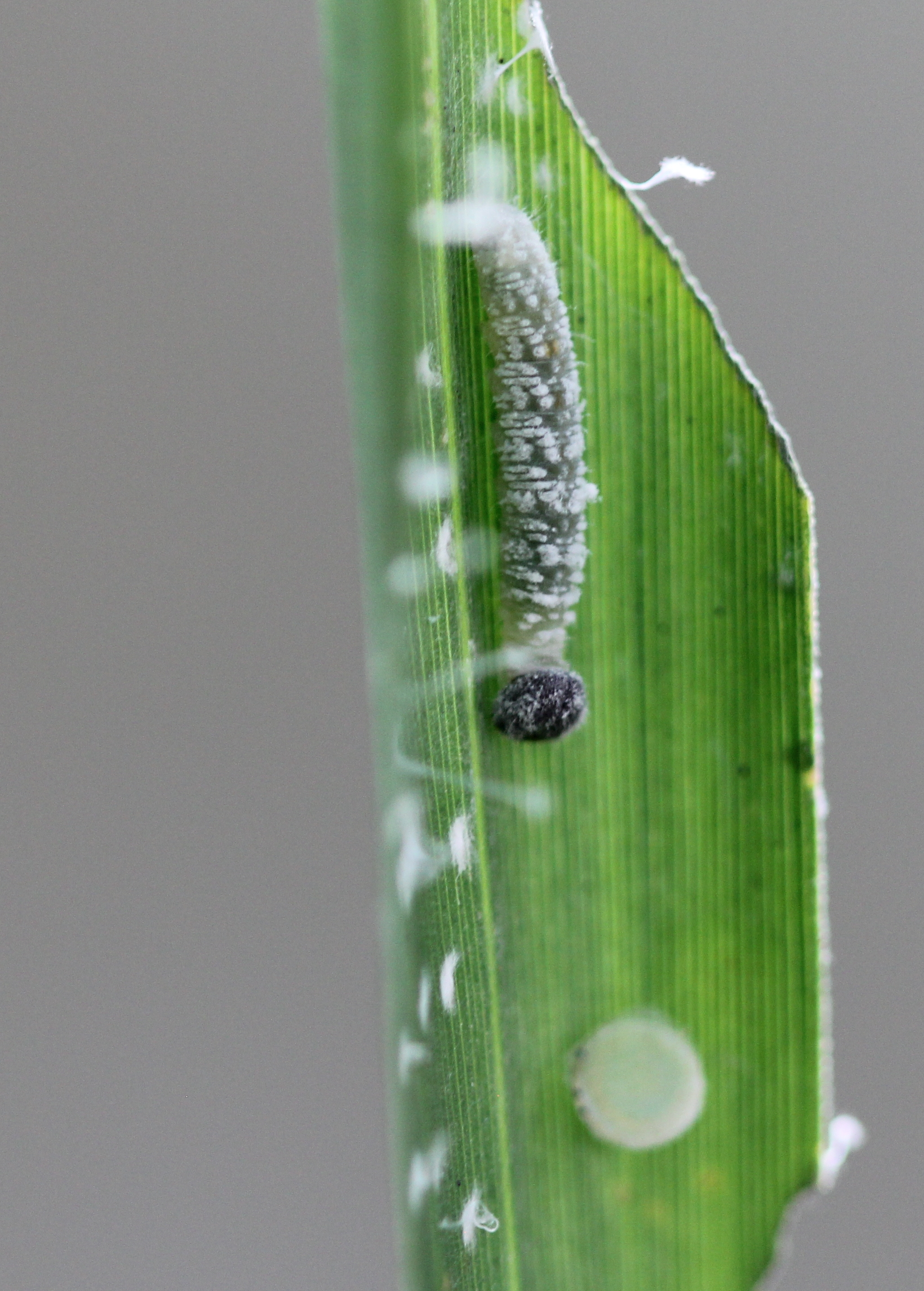
Larva (second instar)

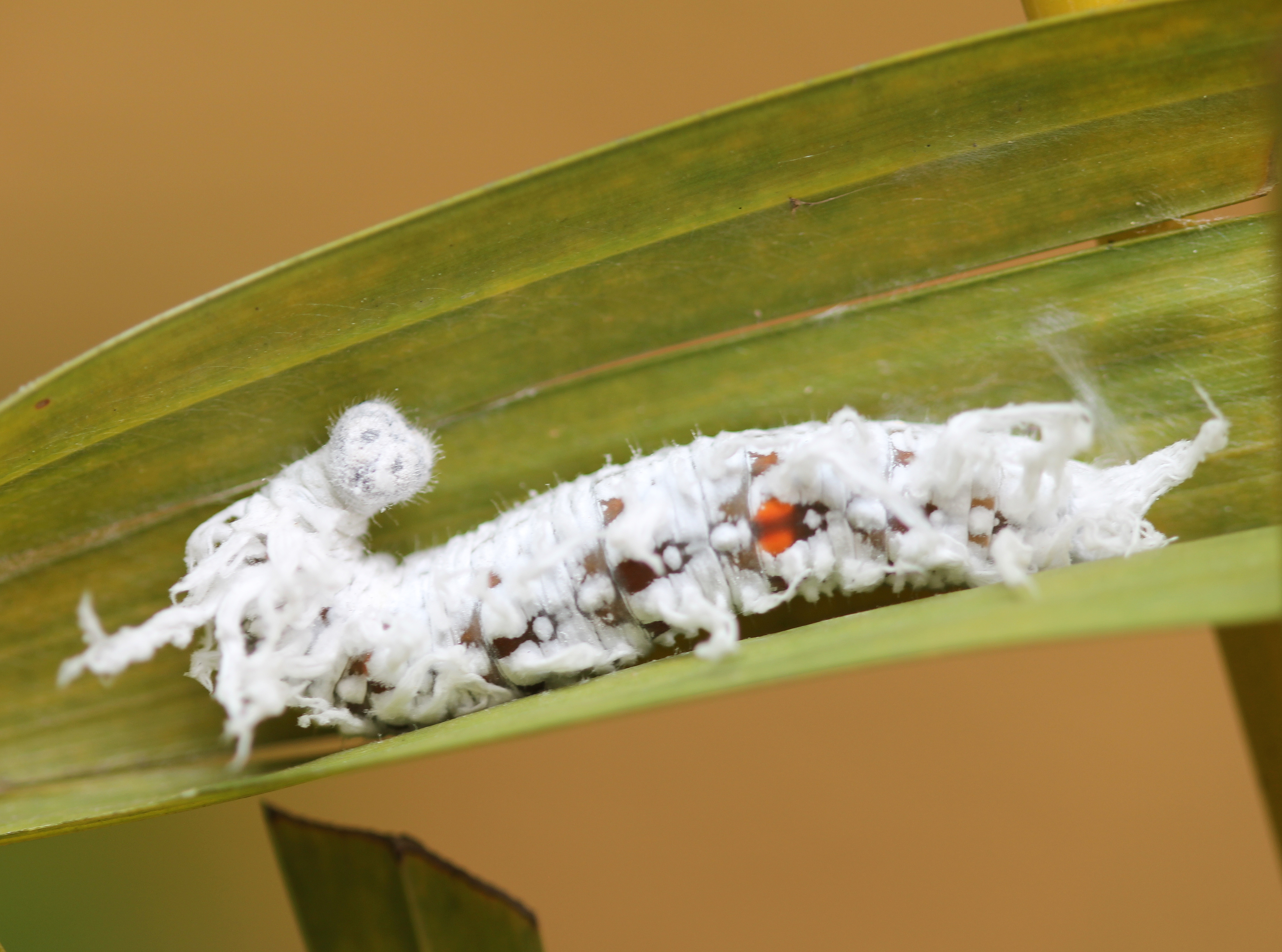
Larva (final instar)

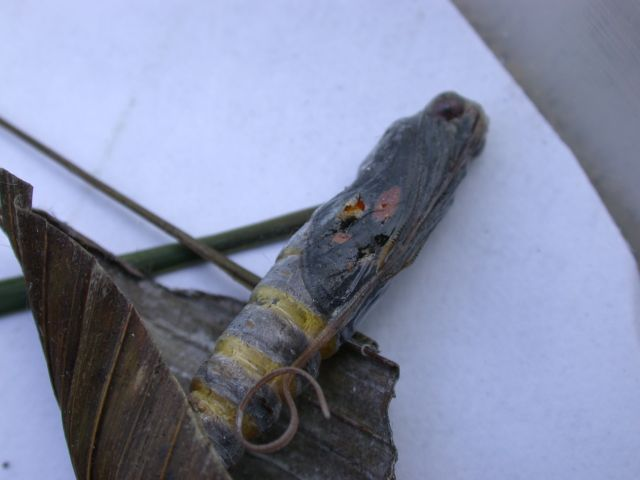
Pupa

==== Genus: Halpe ====
===== Halpe homolea (Indian ace) =====
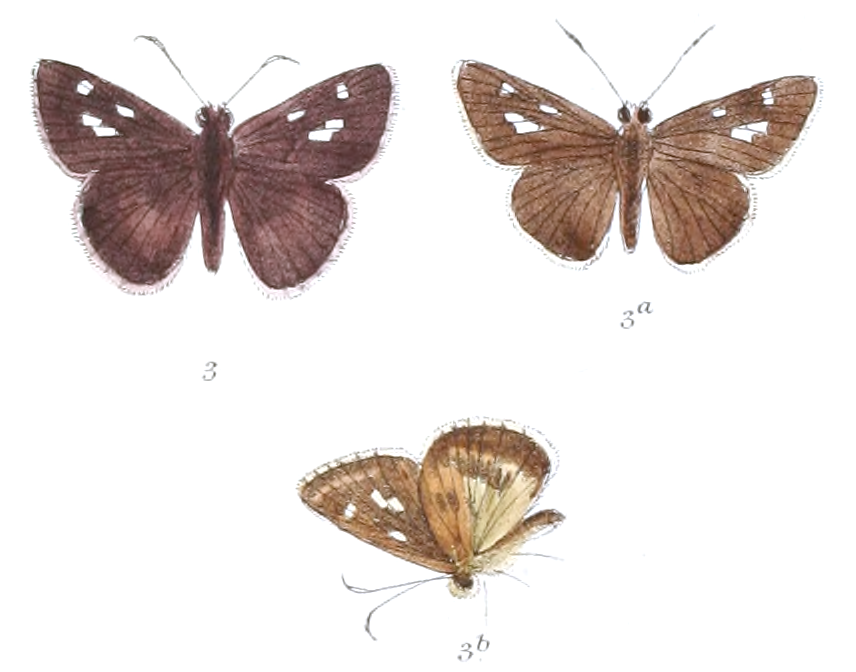
Illustration

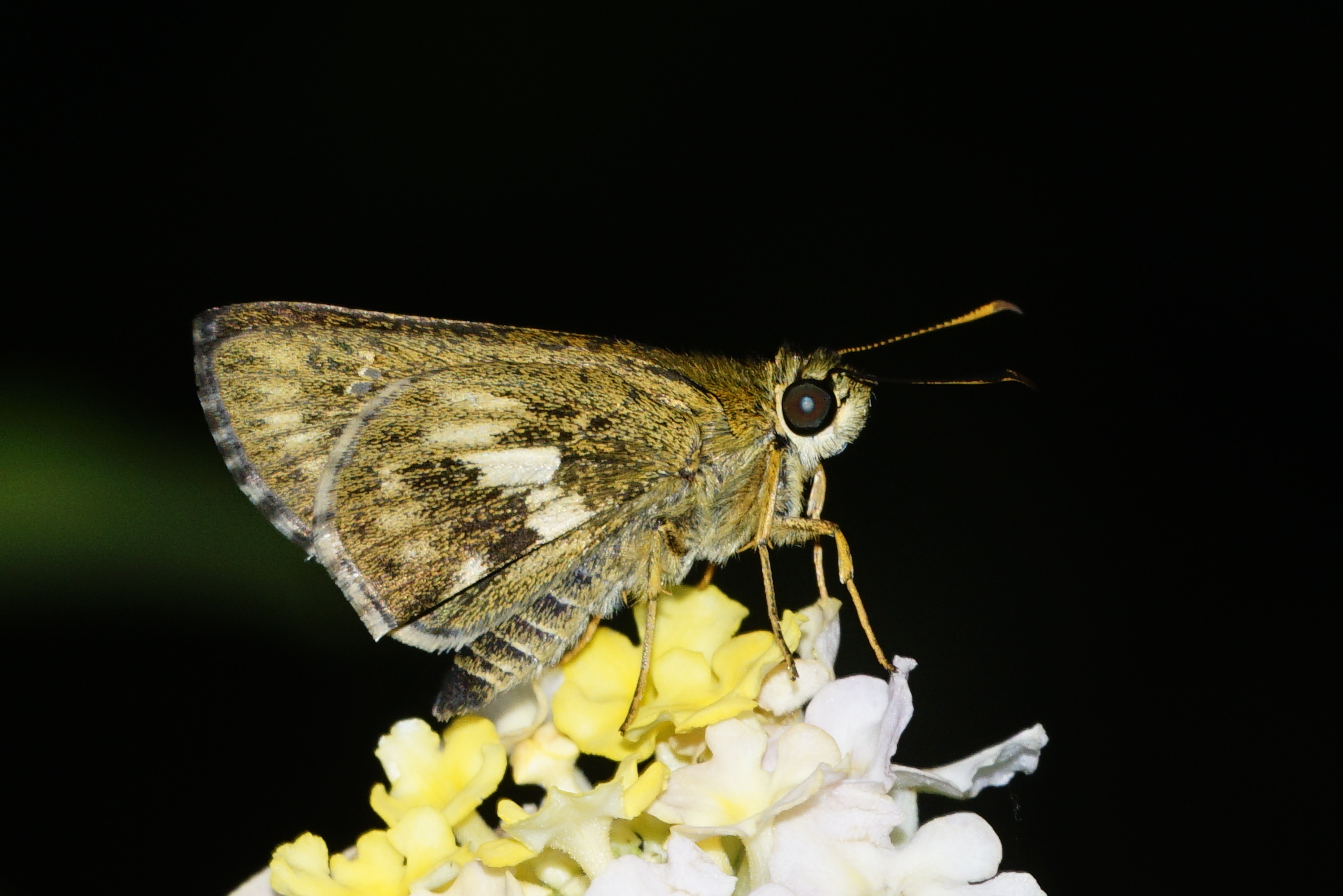
Ventral view

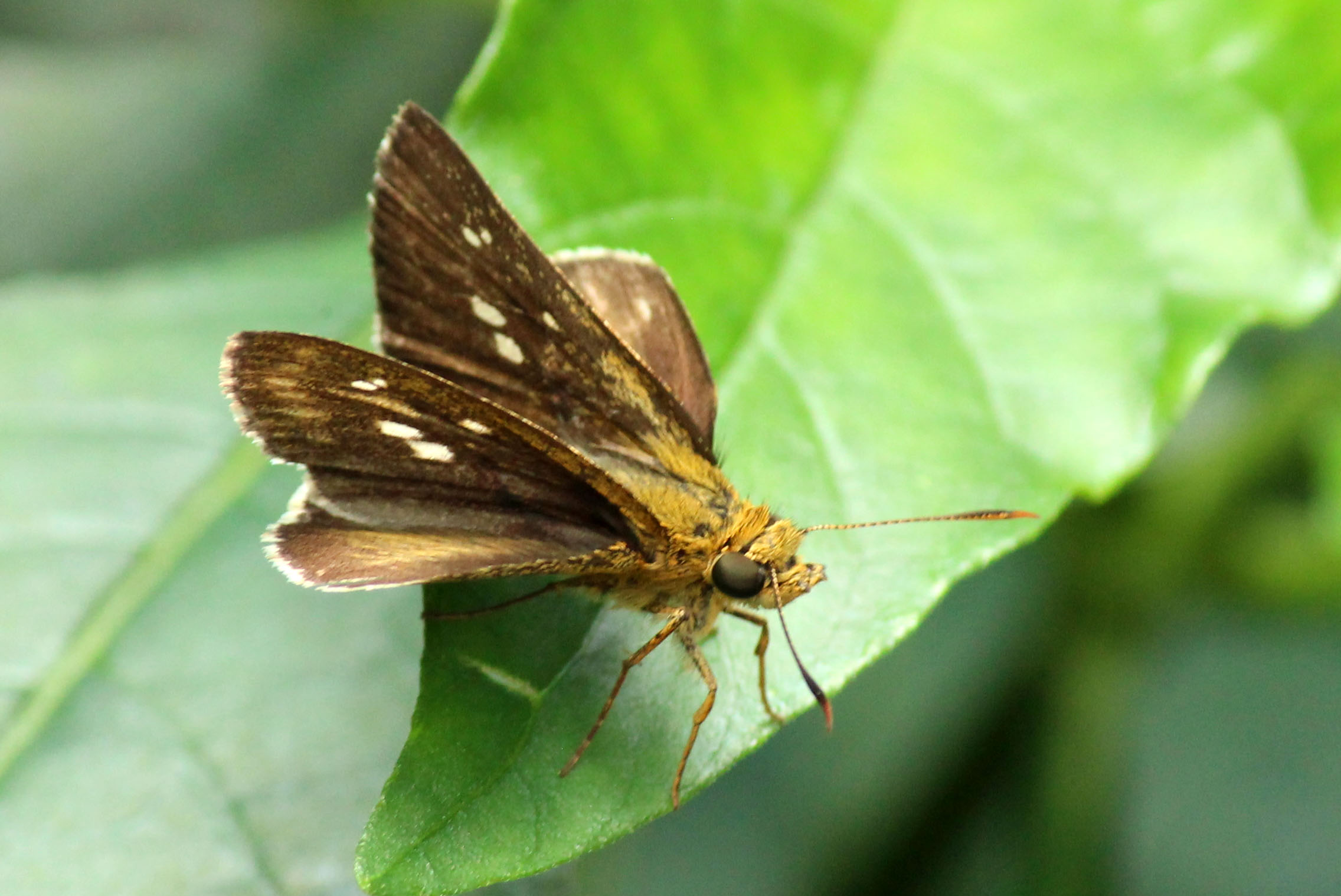
Dorsal view

===== Halpe porus (Moore's ace) =====
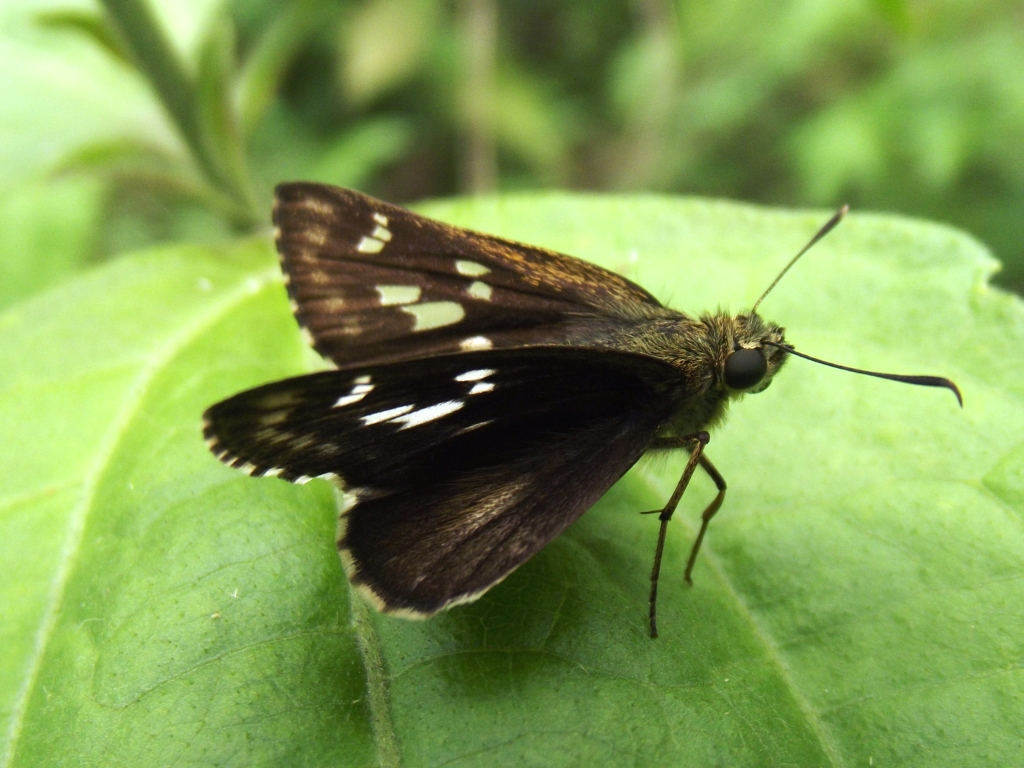
Dorsal view

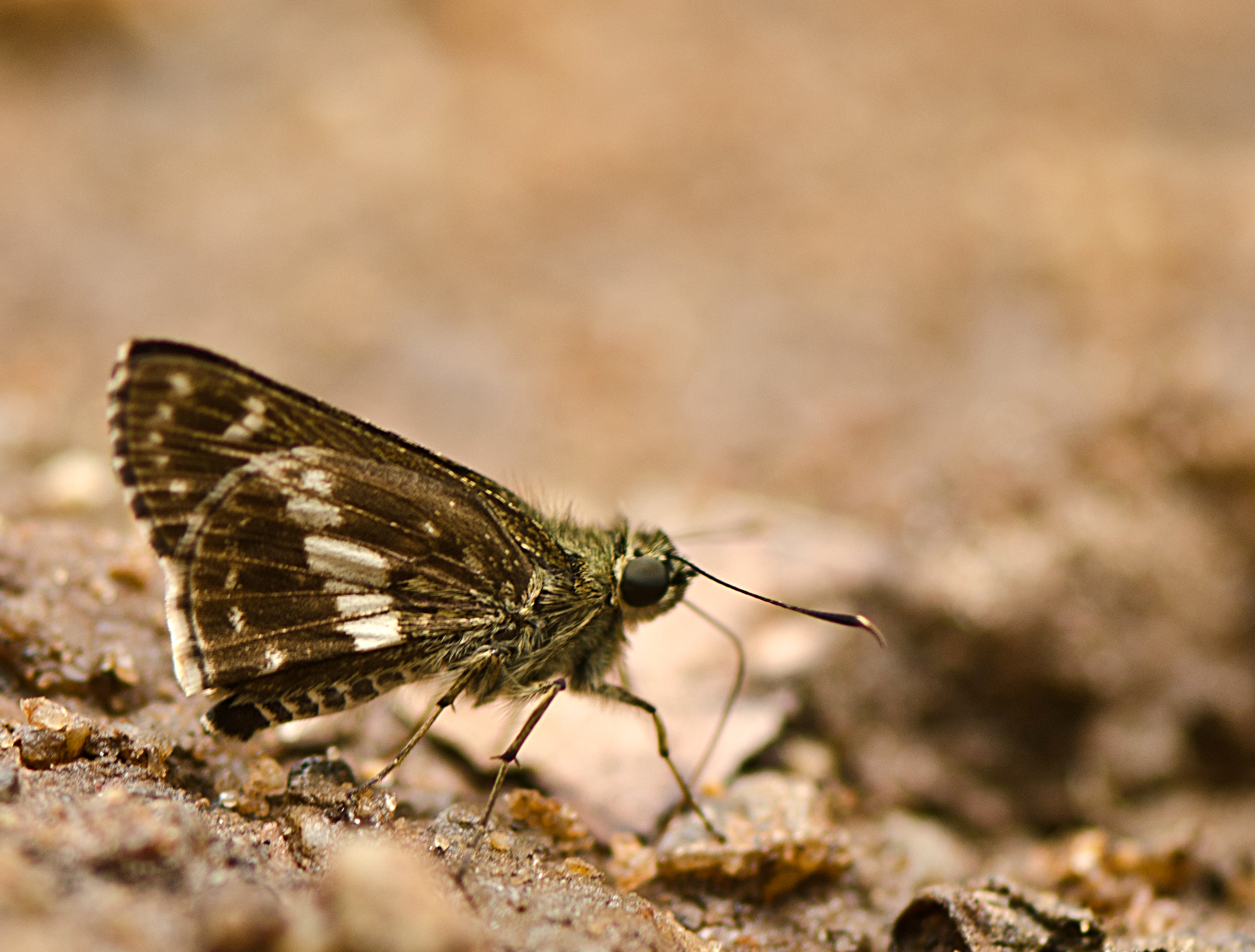
Ventral view

==== Genus: Hyarotis ====
===== Hyarotis adrastus (tree flitter) =====
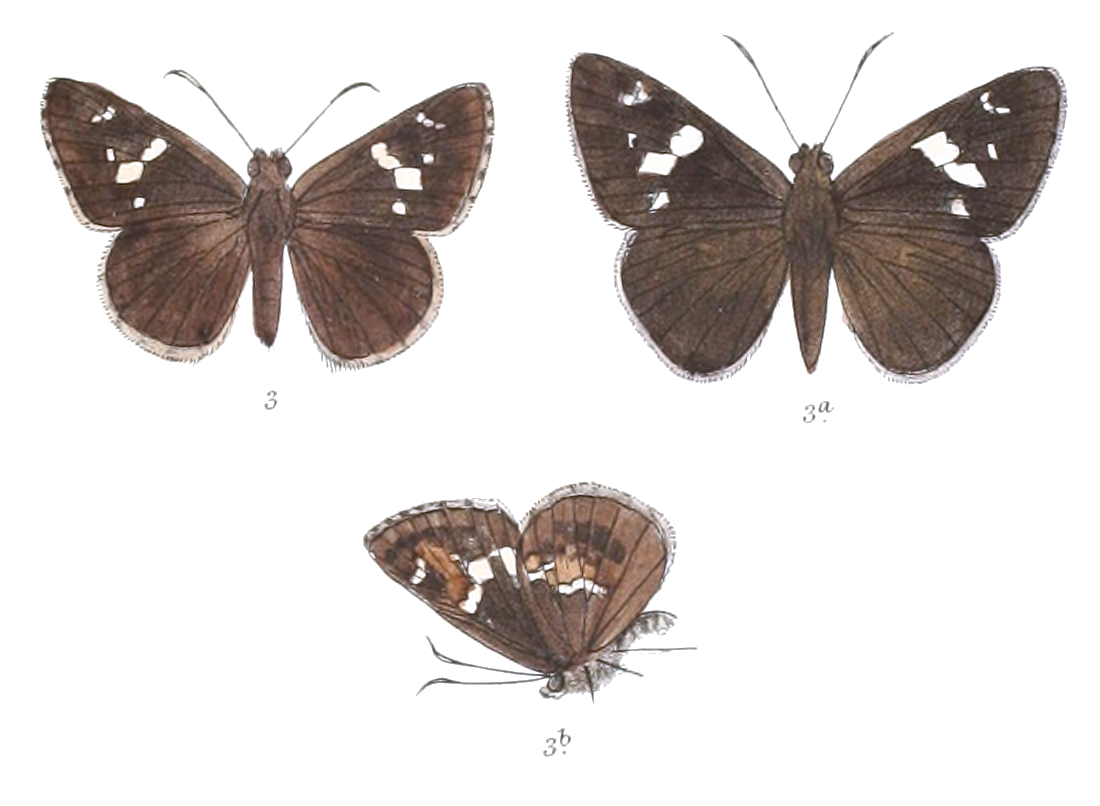
Illustration

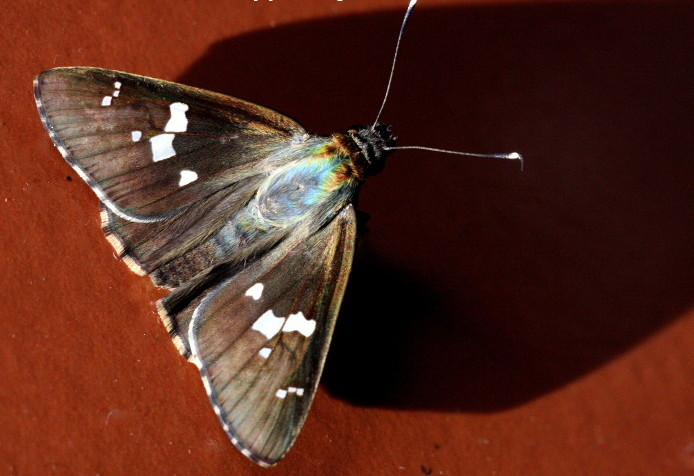
Dorsal view

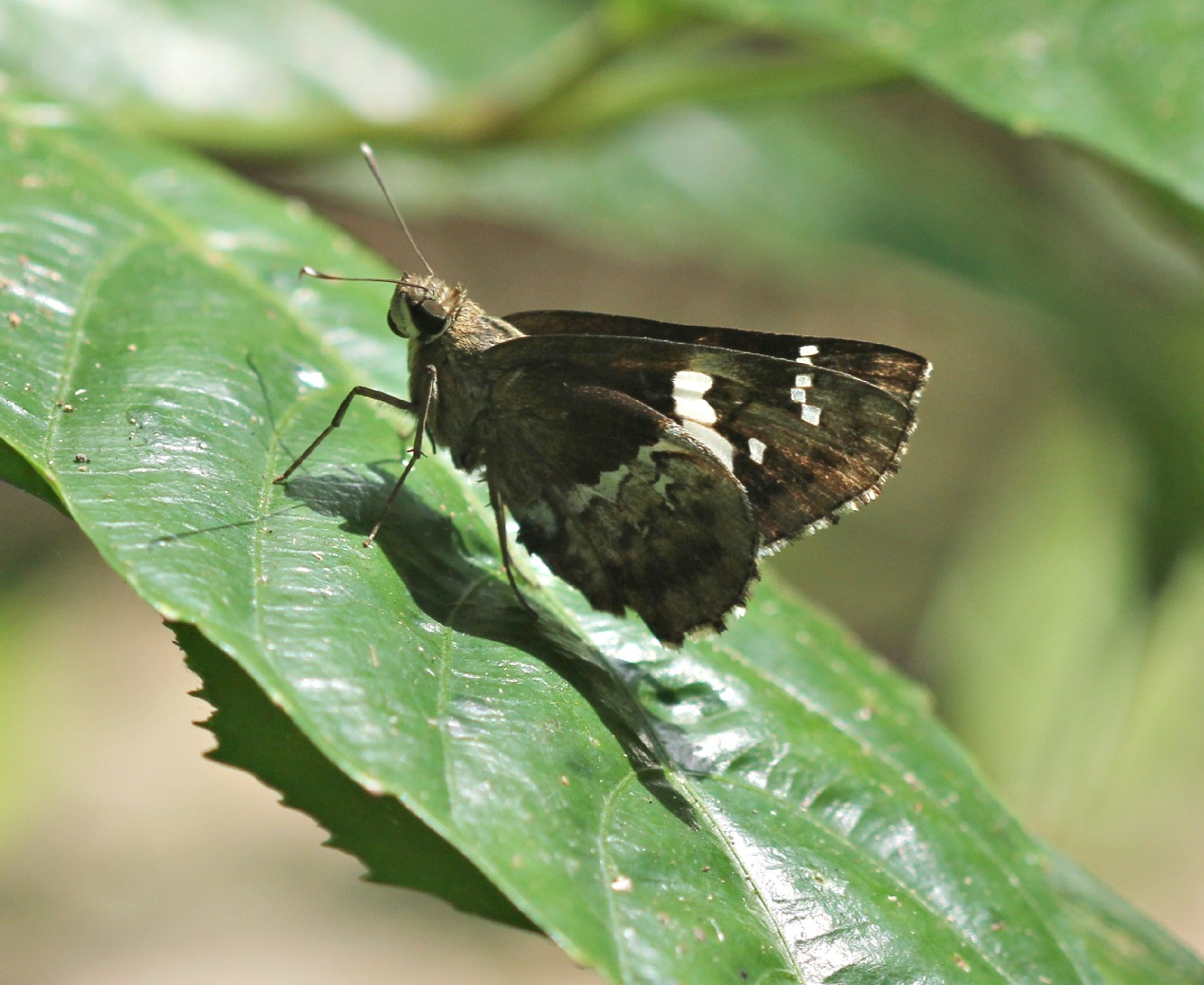
Ventral view

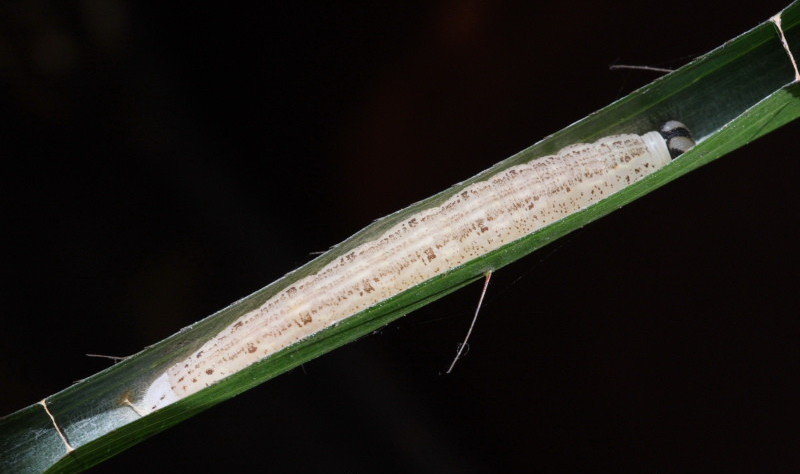
Larva

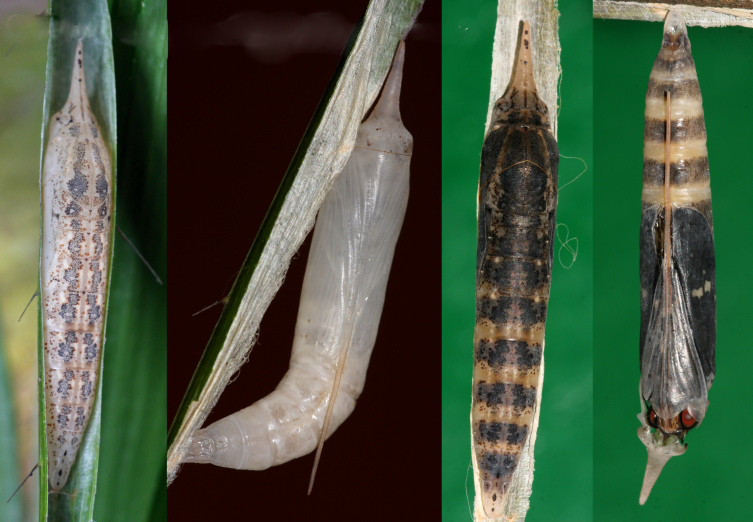
Pupa

===== Hyarotis microstictum (brush flitter) =====
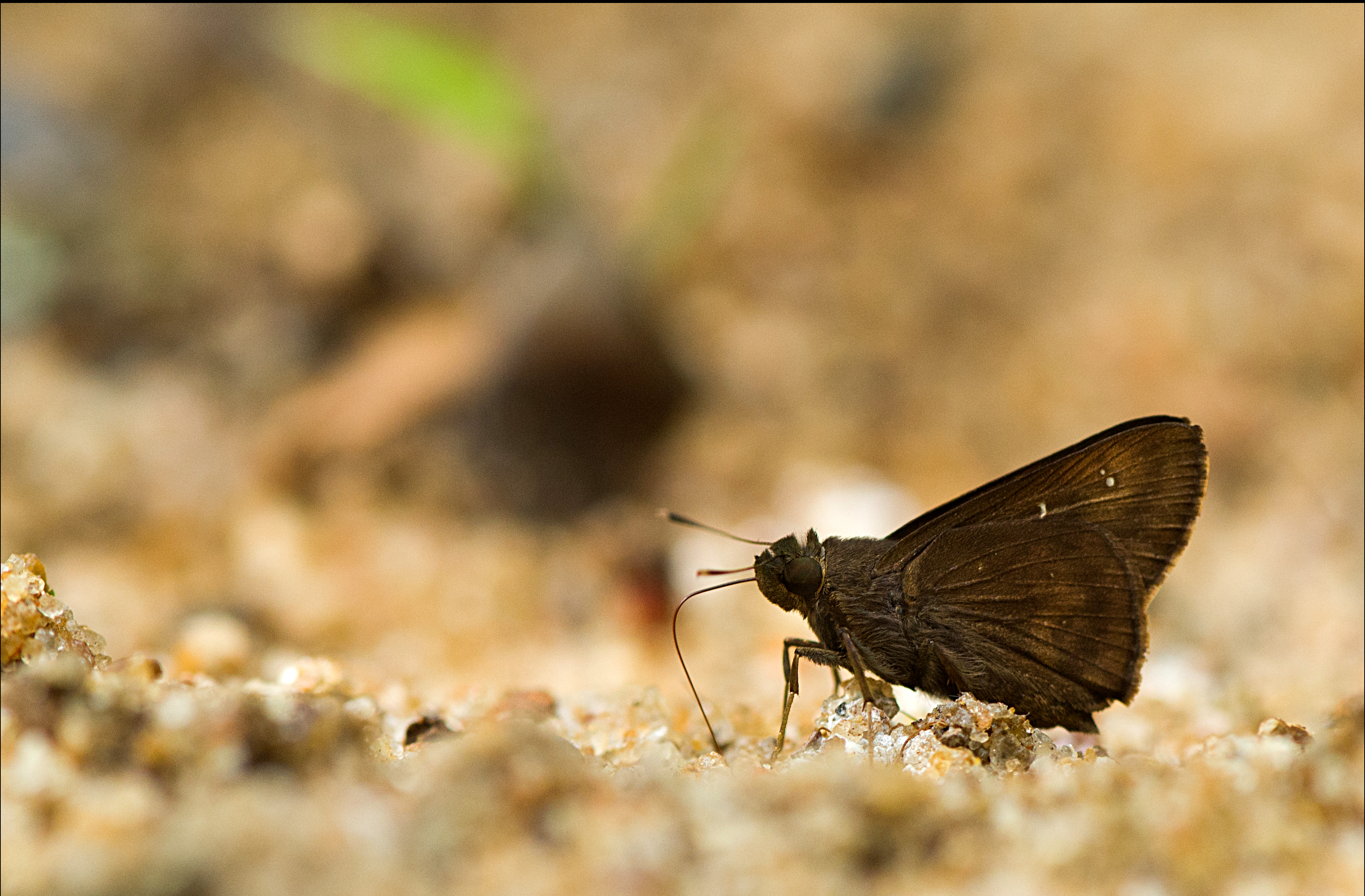
Ventral view

==== Genus: Iambrix ====
===== Iambrix salsala (chestnut bob) =====
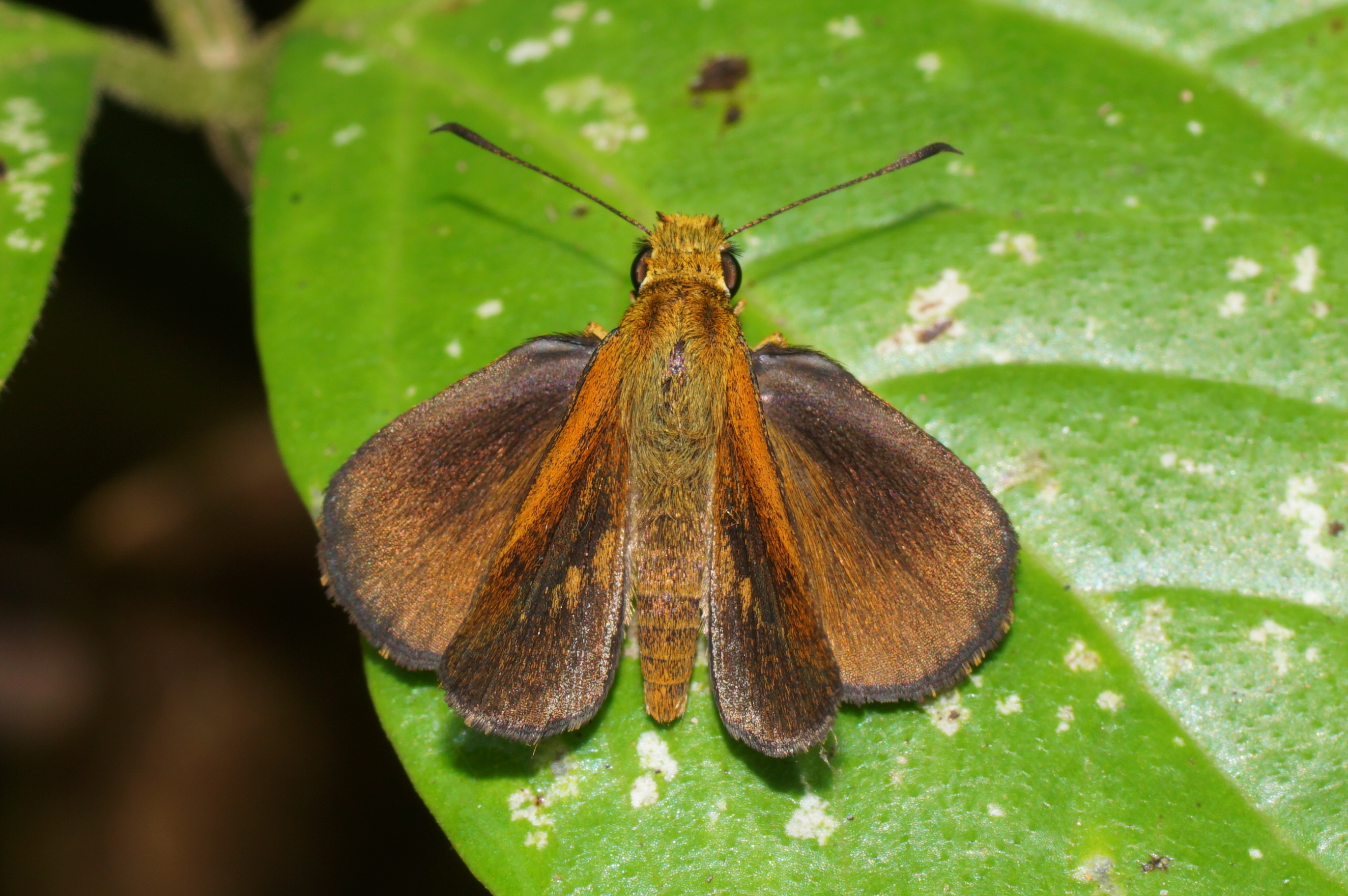
Dorsal view

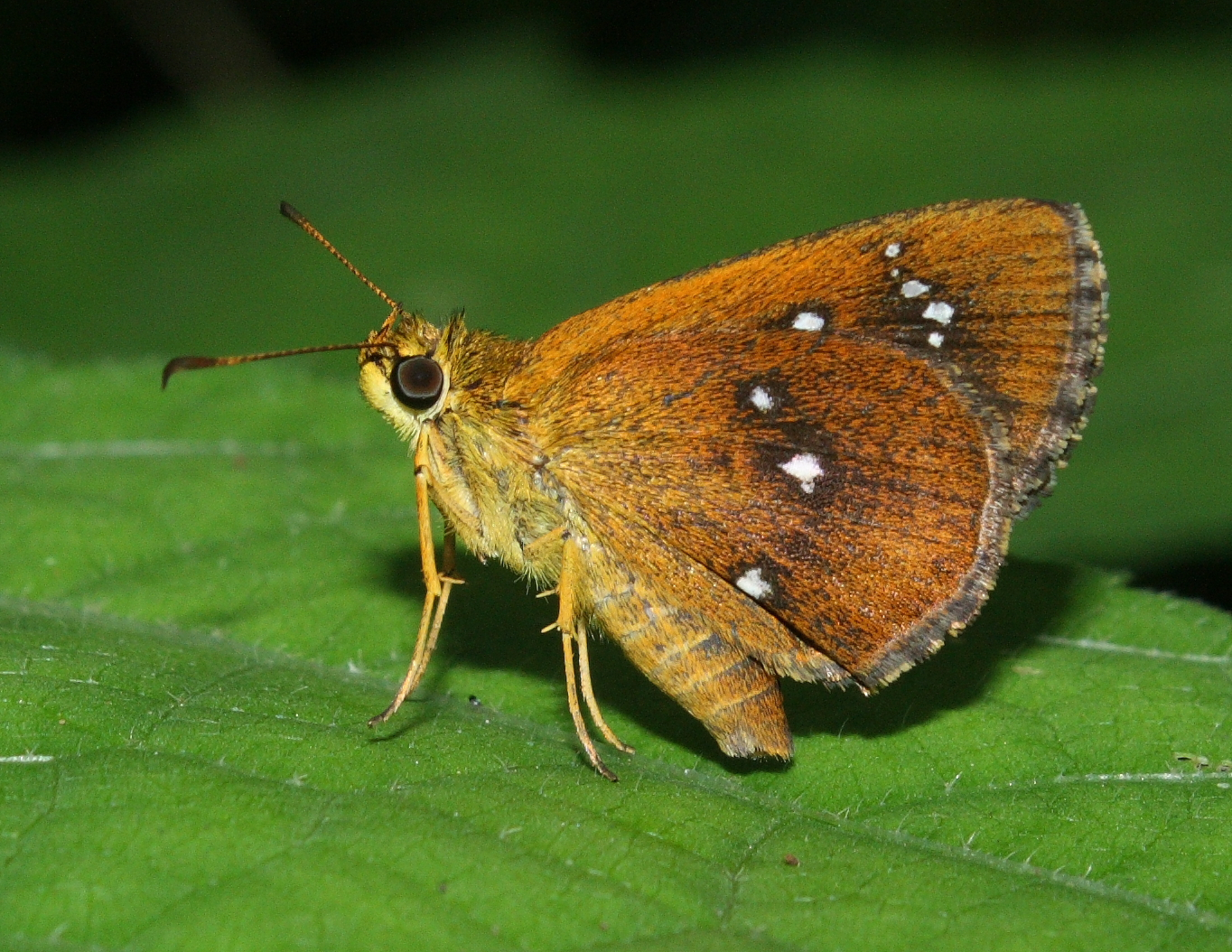
Ventral view

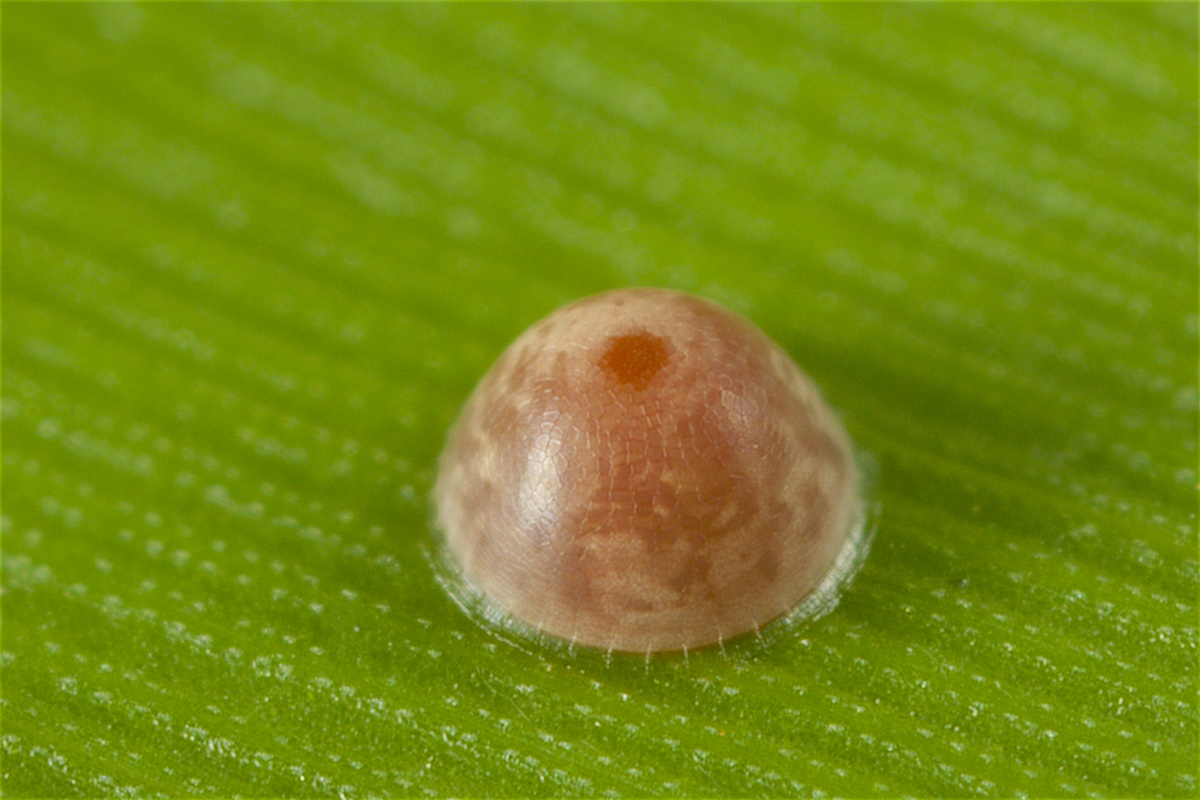
Egg

==== Genus: Matapa ====
===== Matapa aria (common redeye) =====
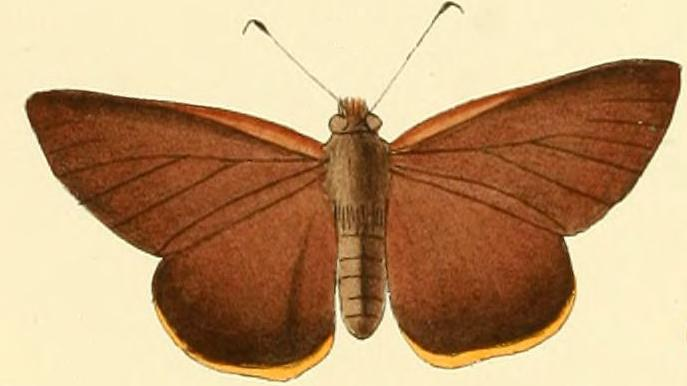
Illustration

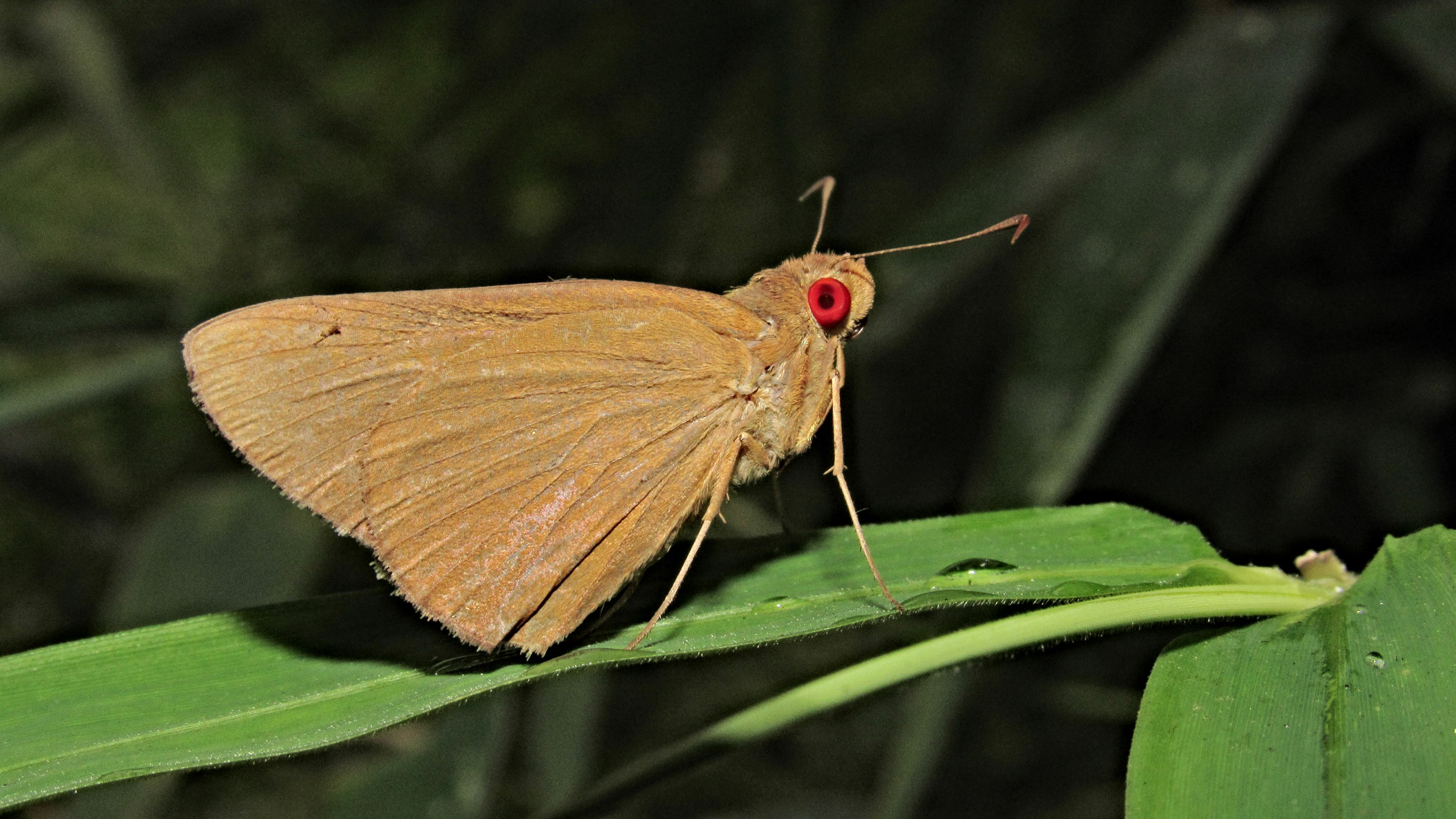
Ventral view

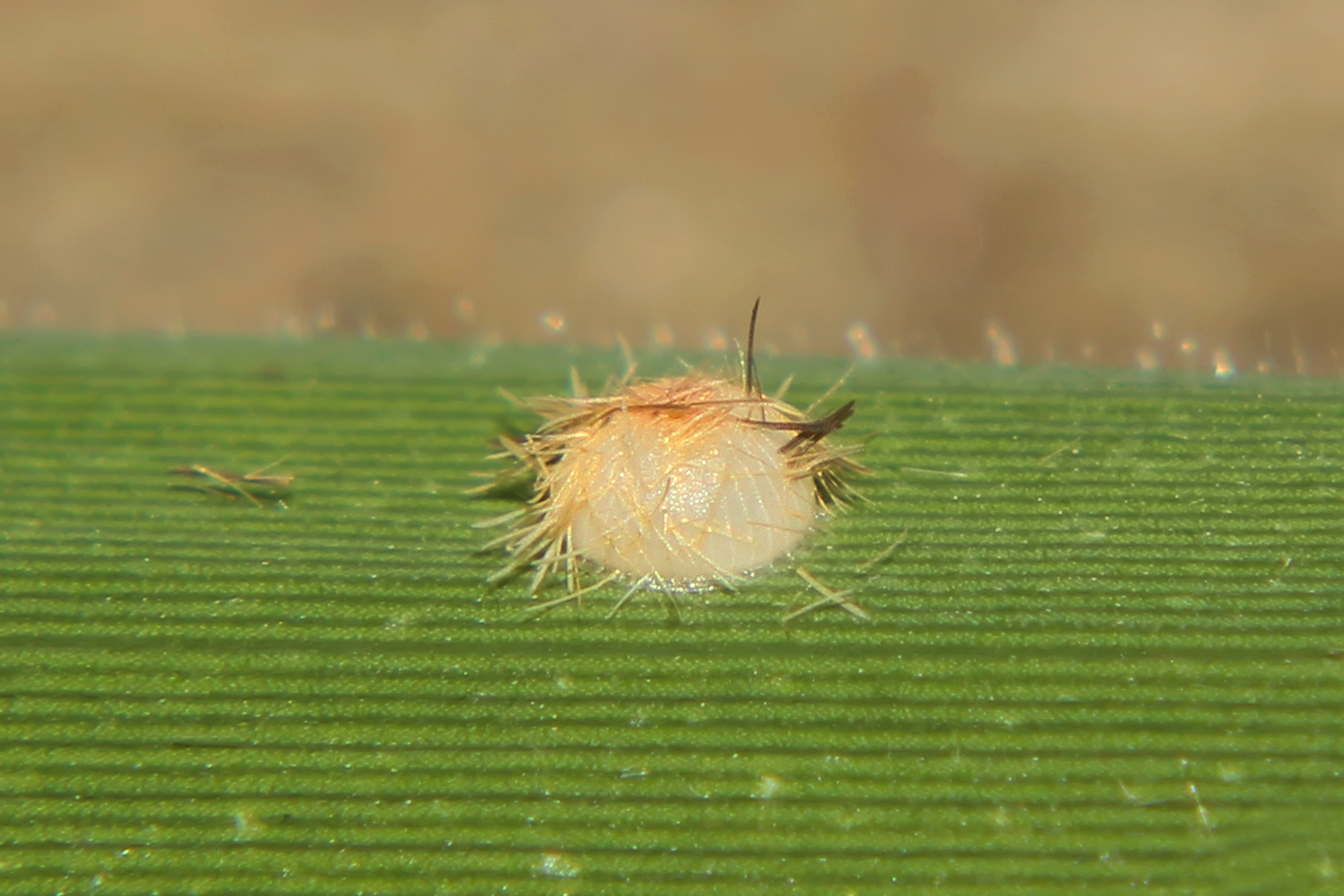
Egg

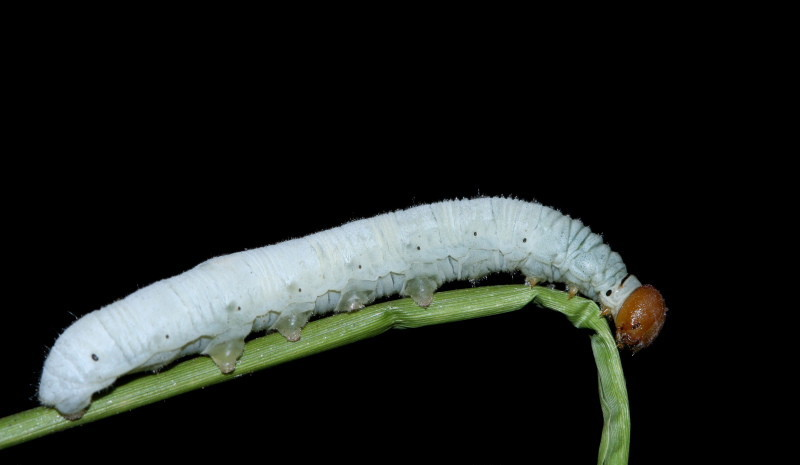
Larva

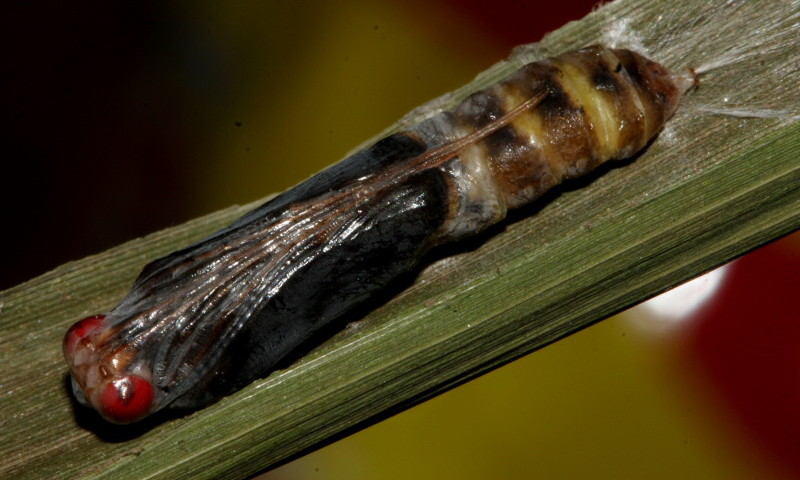
Pupa

==== Genus: Notocrypta ====
===== Notocrypta curvifascia (restricted demon) =====
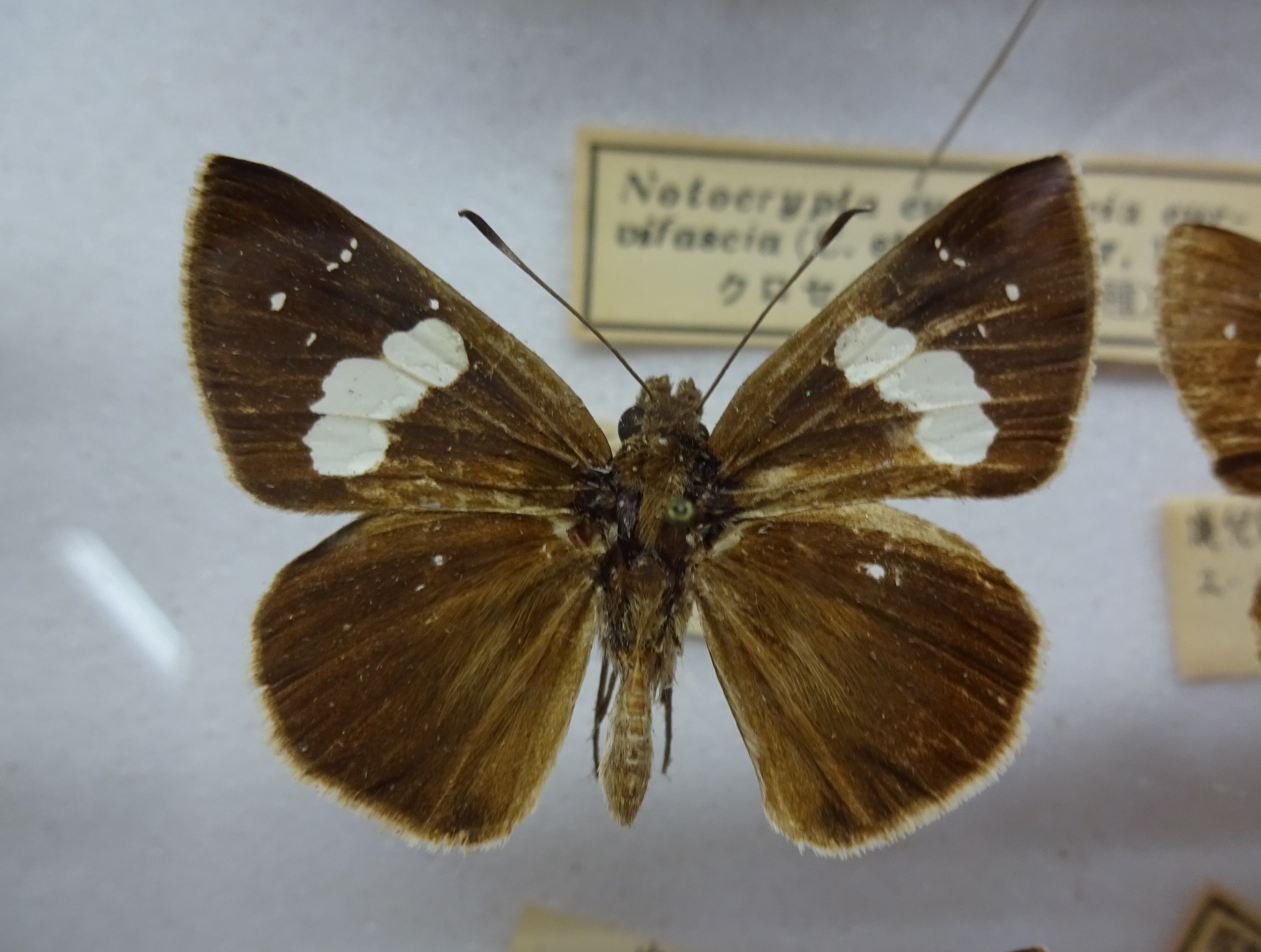
Museum specimen

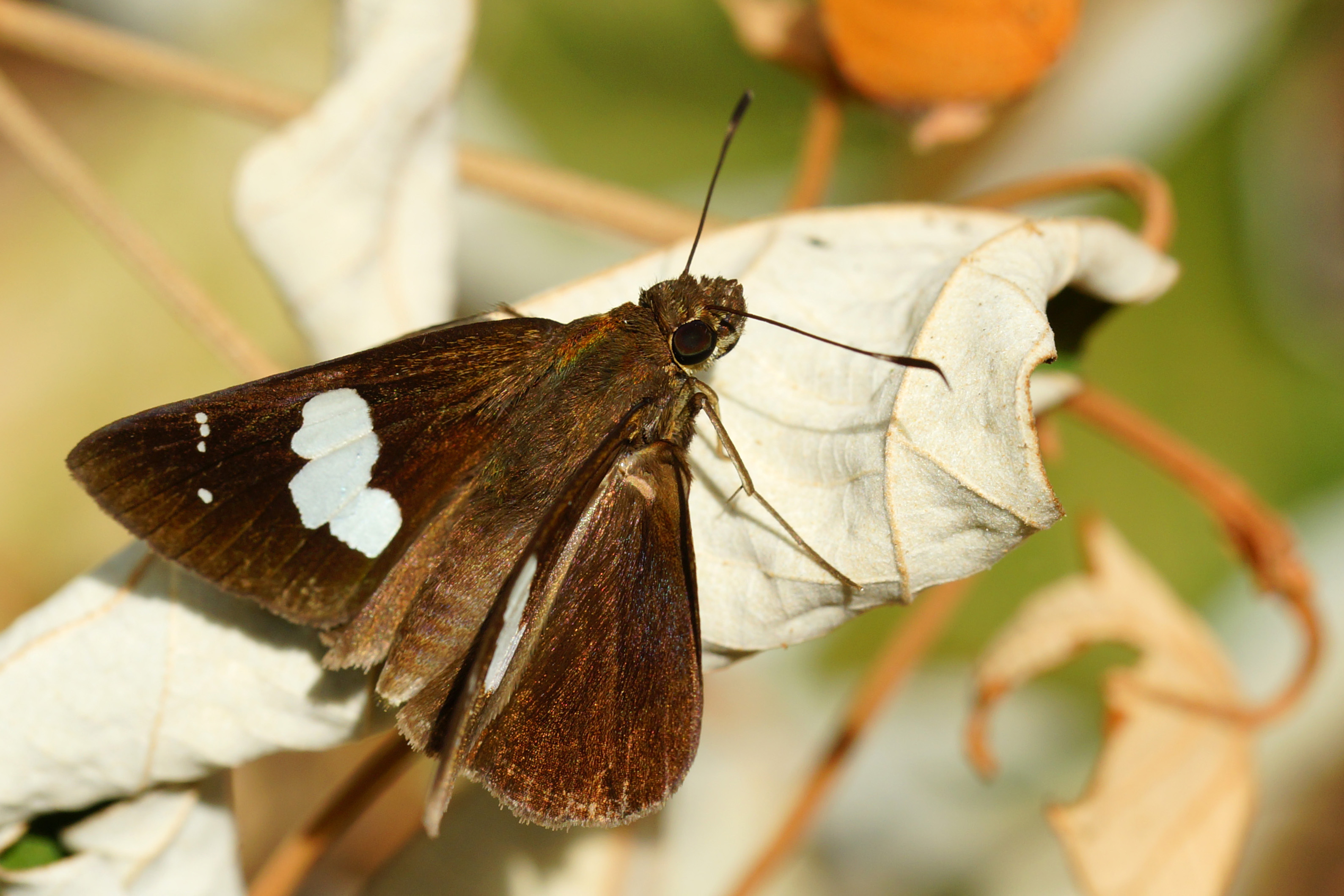
Dorsal view

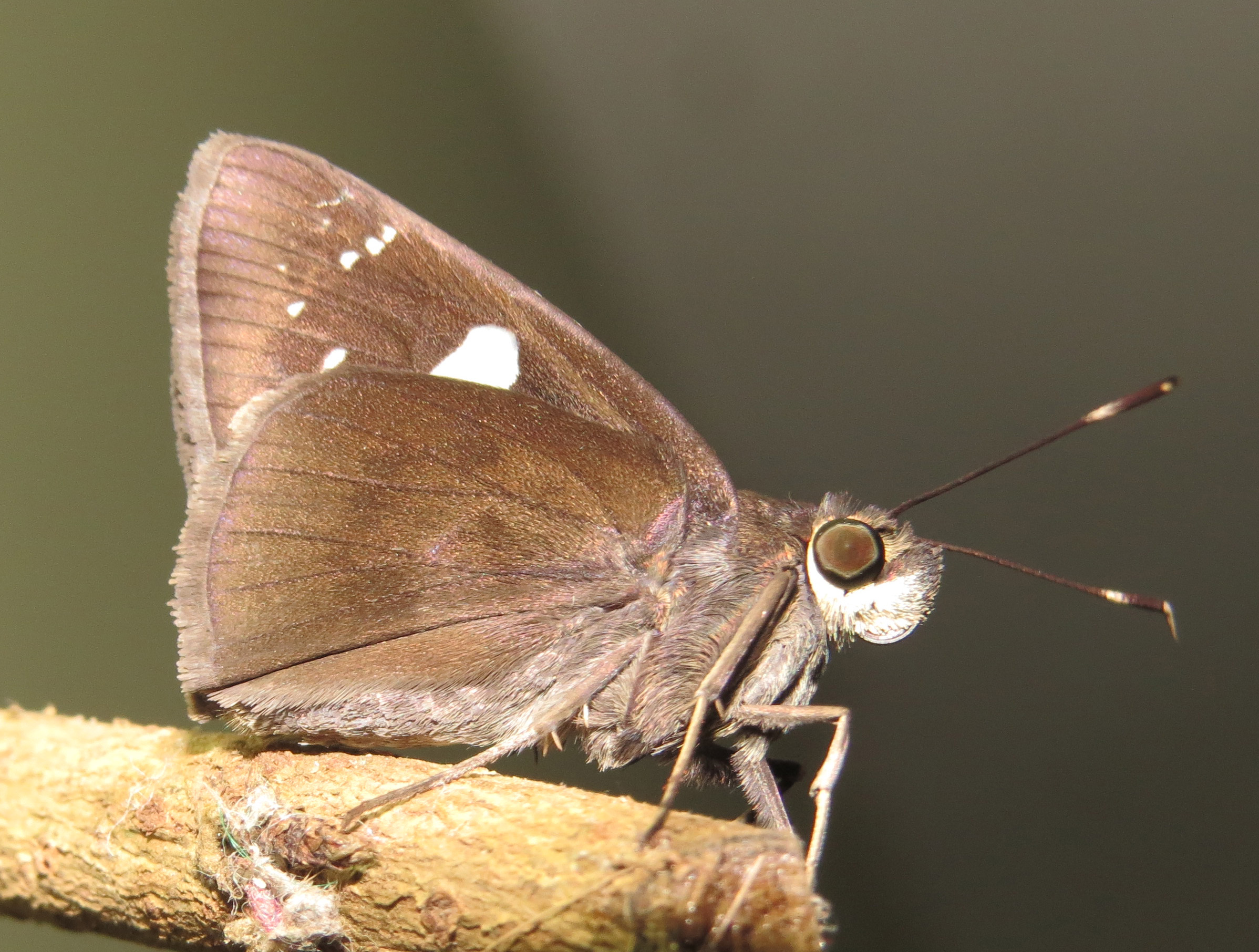
Ventral view

===== Notocrypta paralysos (common banded demon) =====
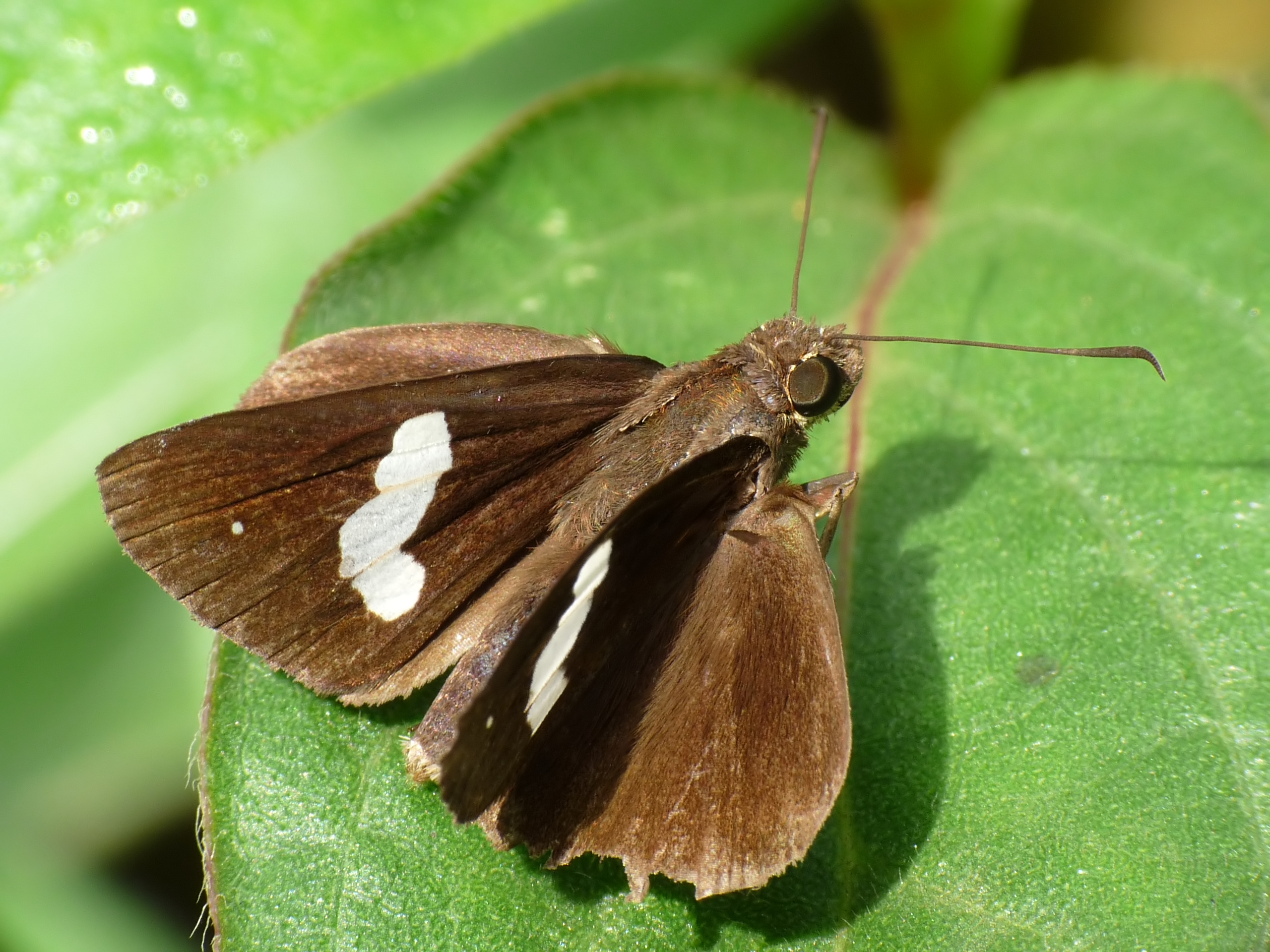
Dorsal view

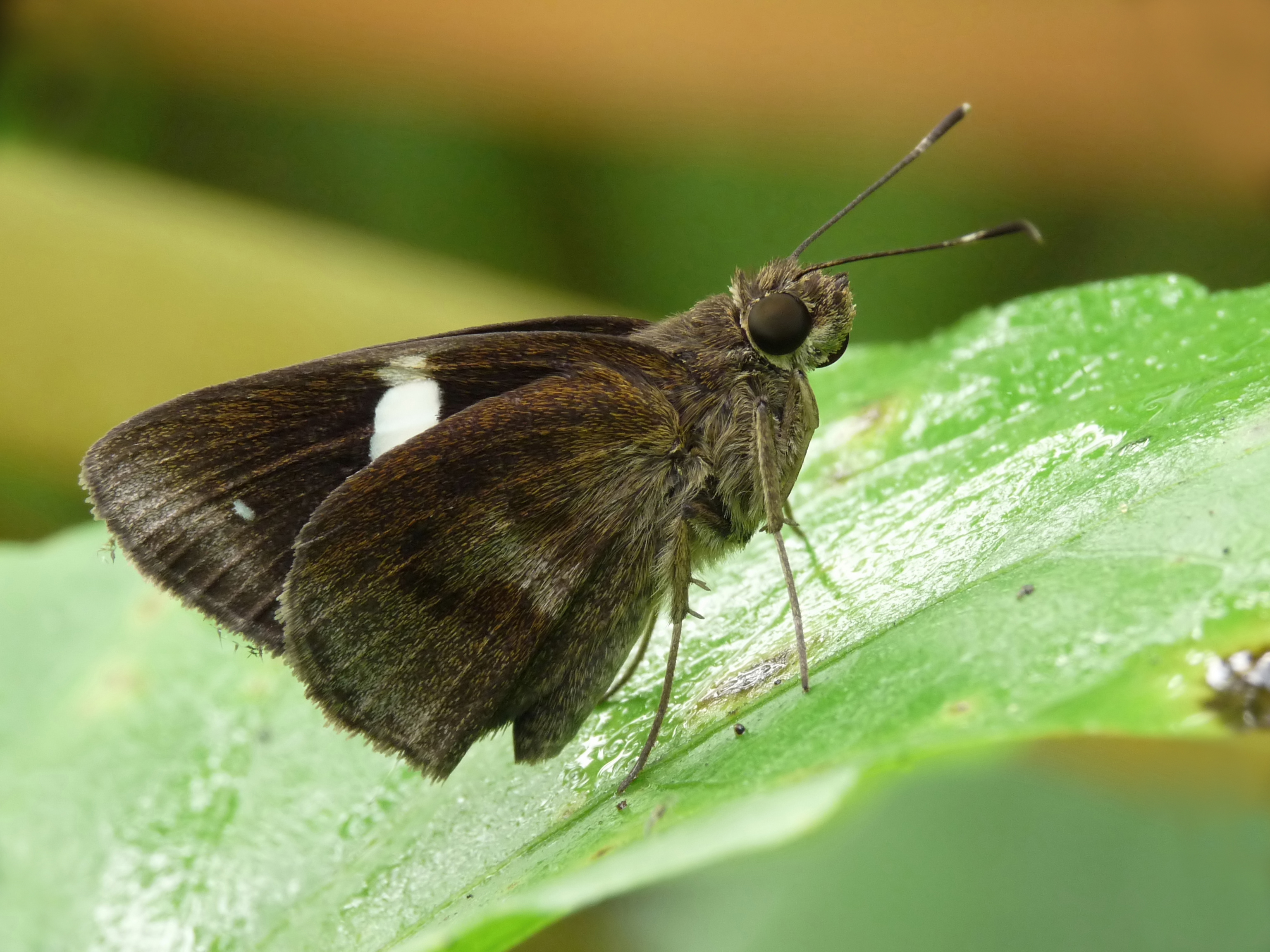
Ventral view

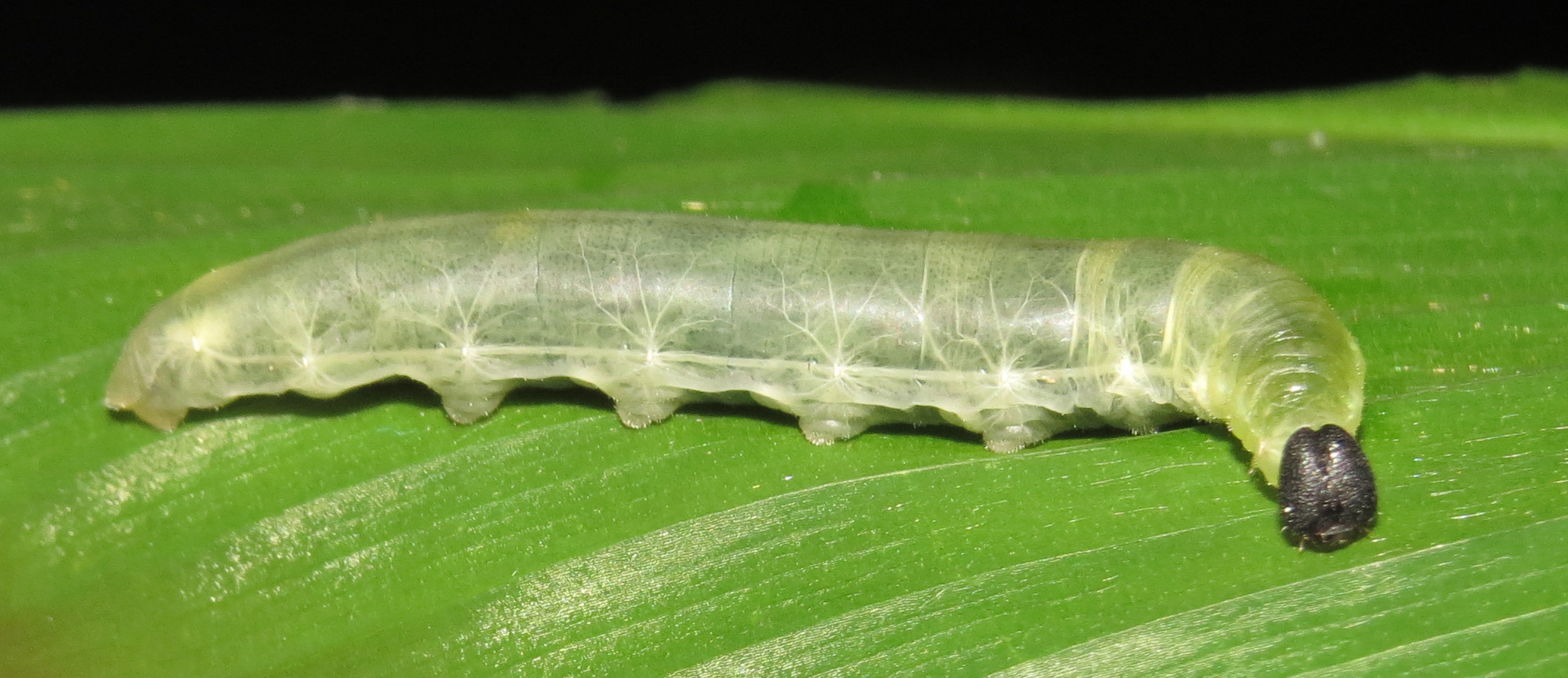
Larva

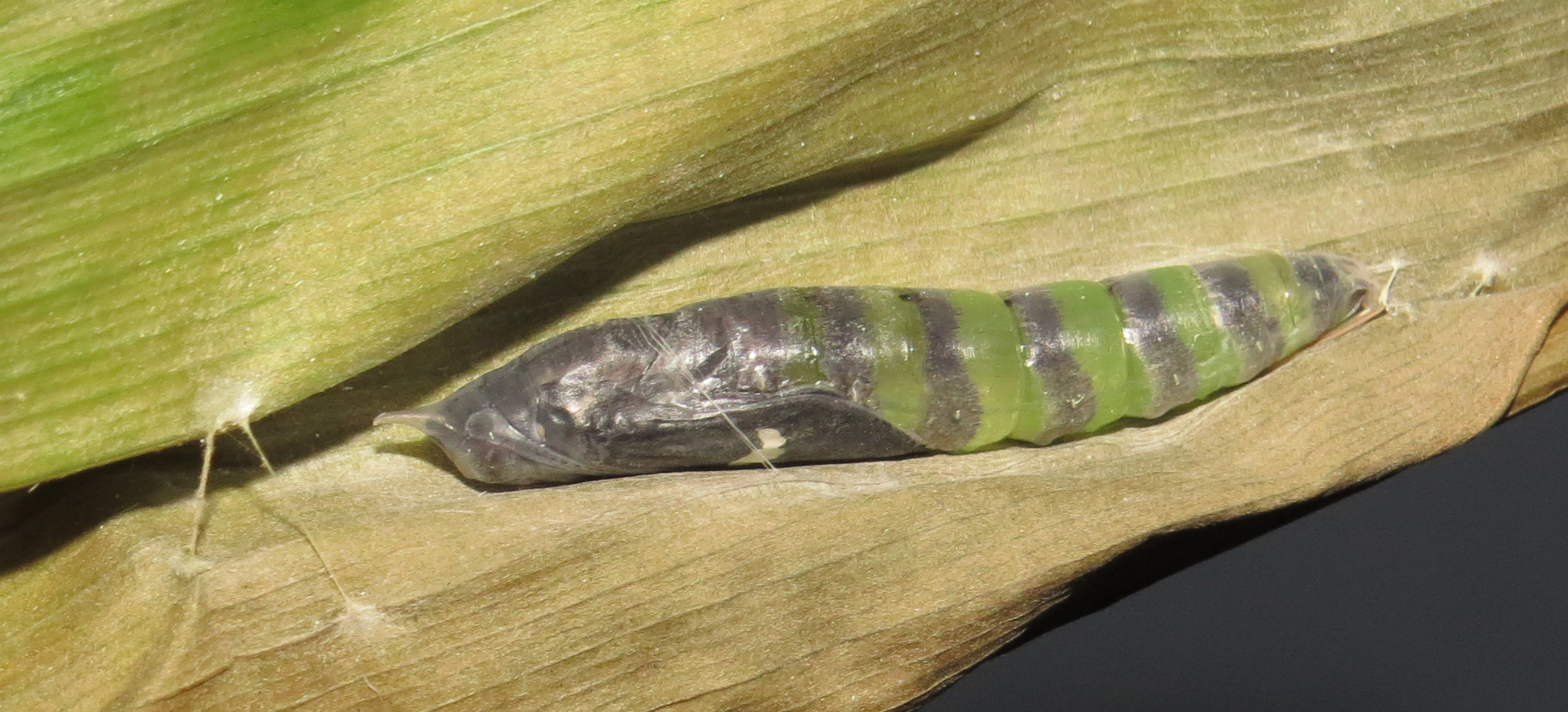
Pupa

==== Genus: Oriens ====
===== Oriens concinna (Tamil dartlet) =====
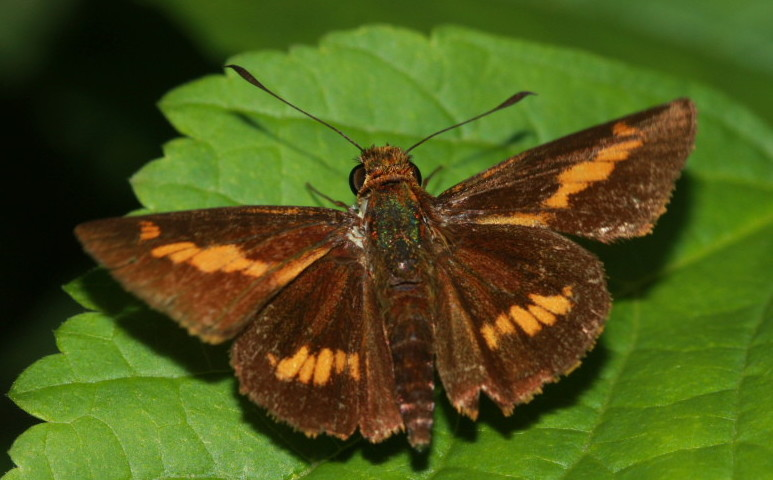
Dorsal view

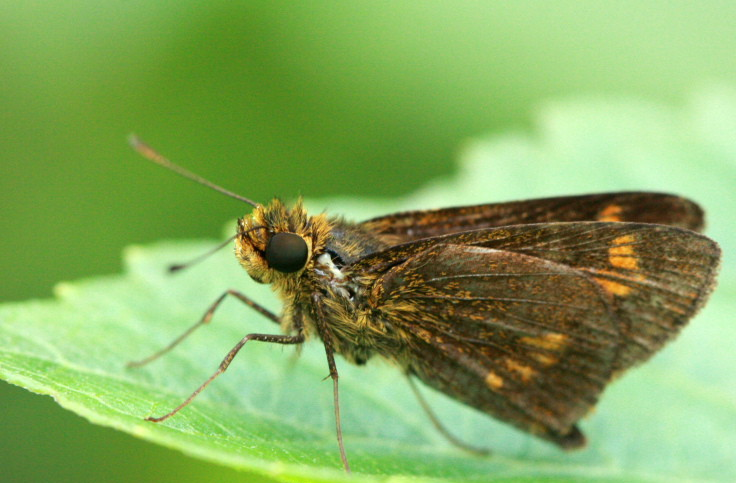
Ventral view

===== Oriens goloides (Ceylon dartlet) =====
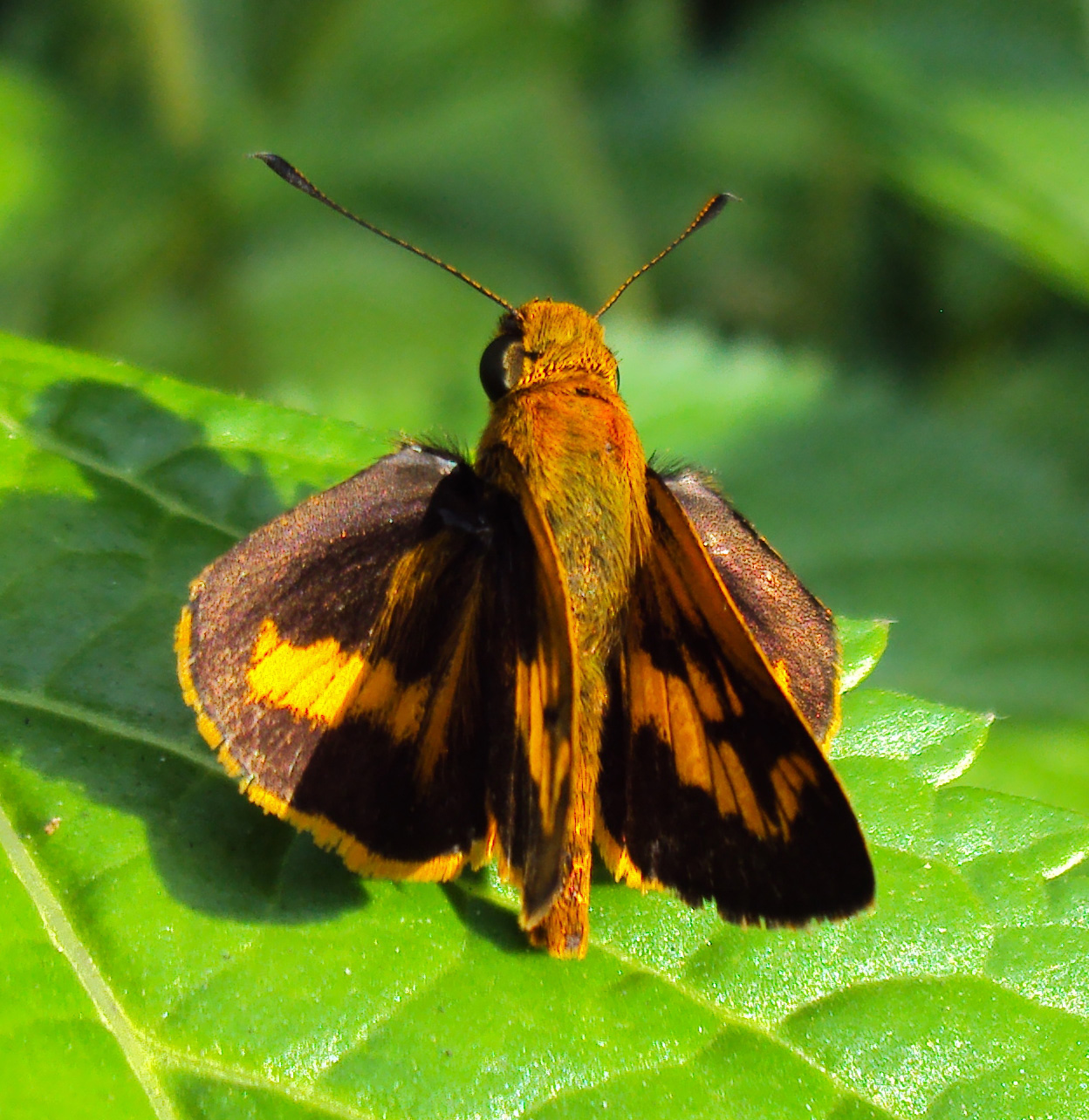
Dorsal view

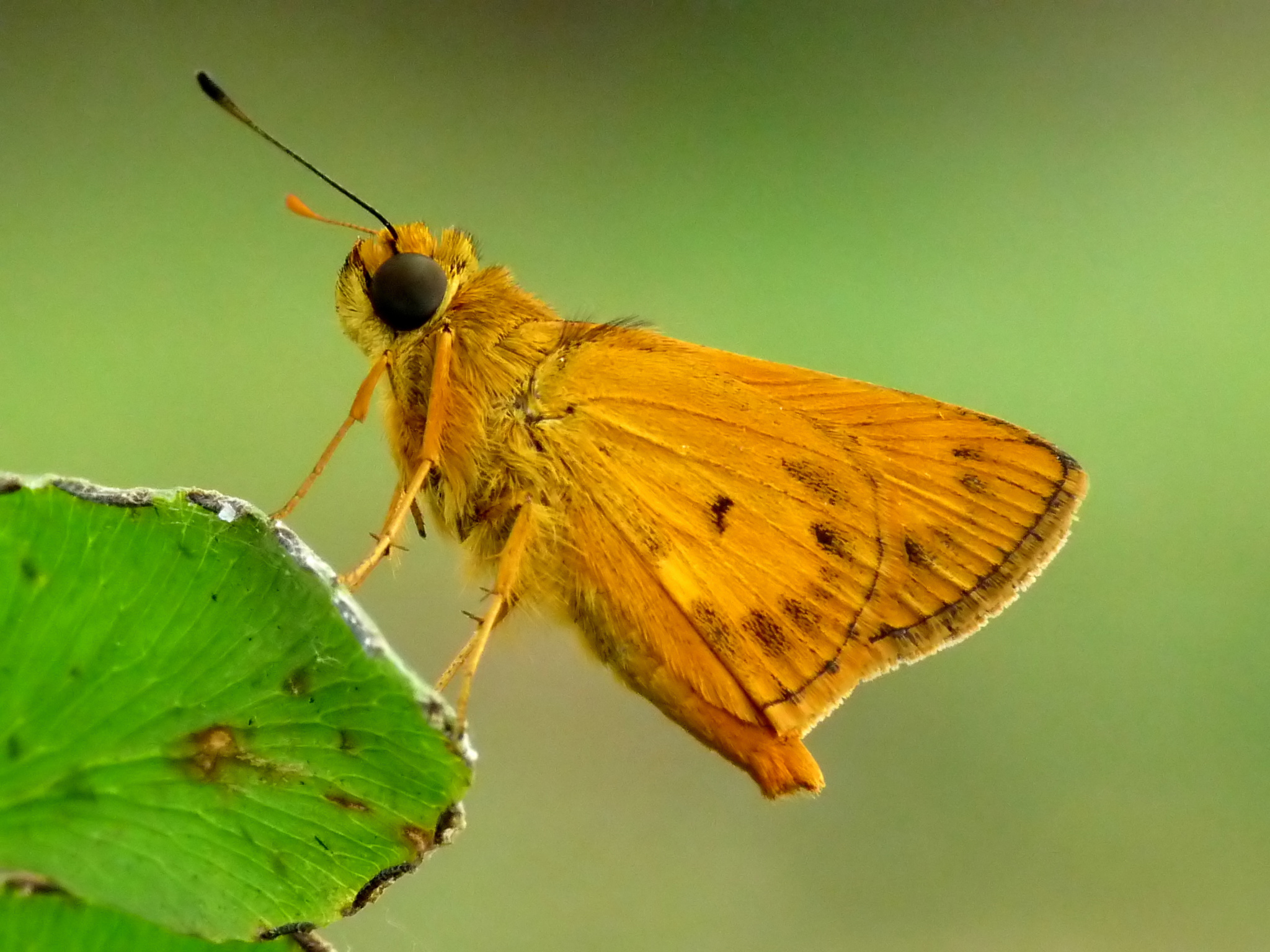
Ventral view

==== Genus: Parnara ====
===== Parnara bada (Oriental/variable swift) =====
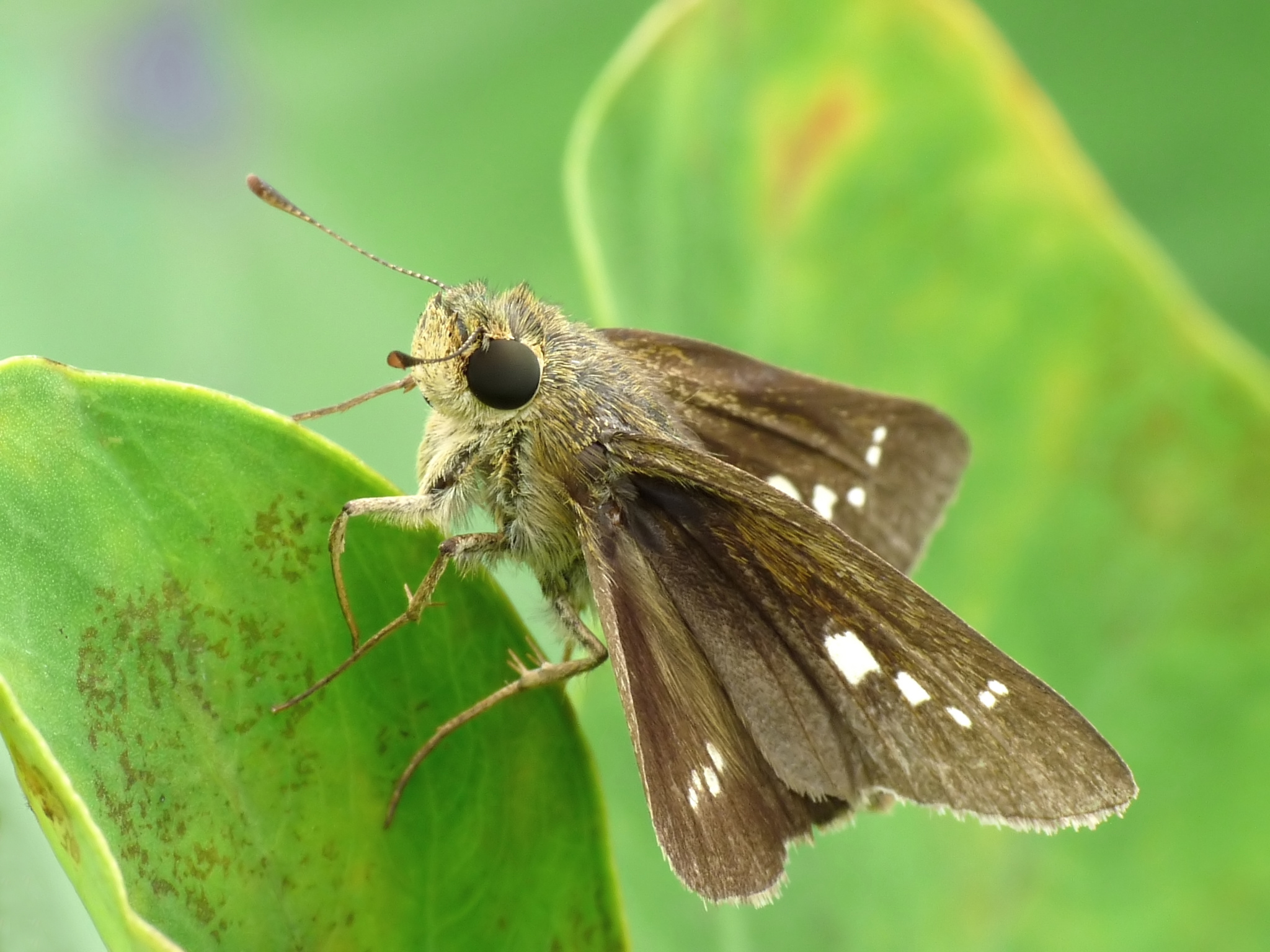
Dorsal view

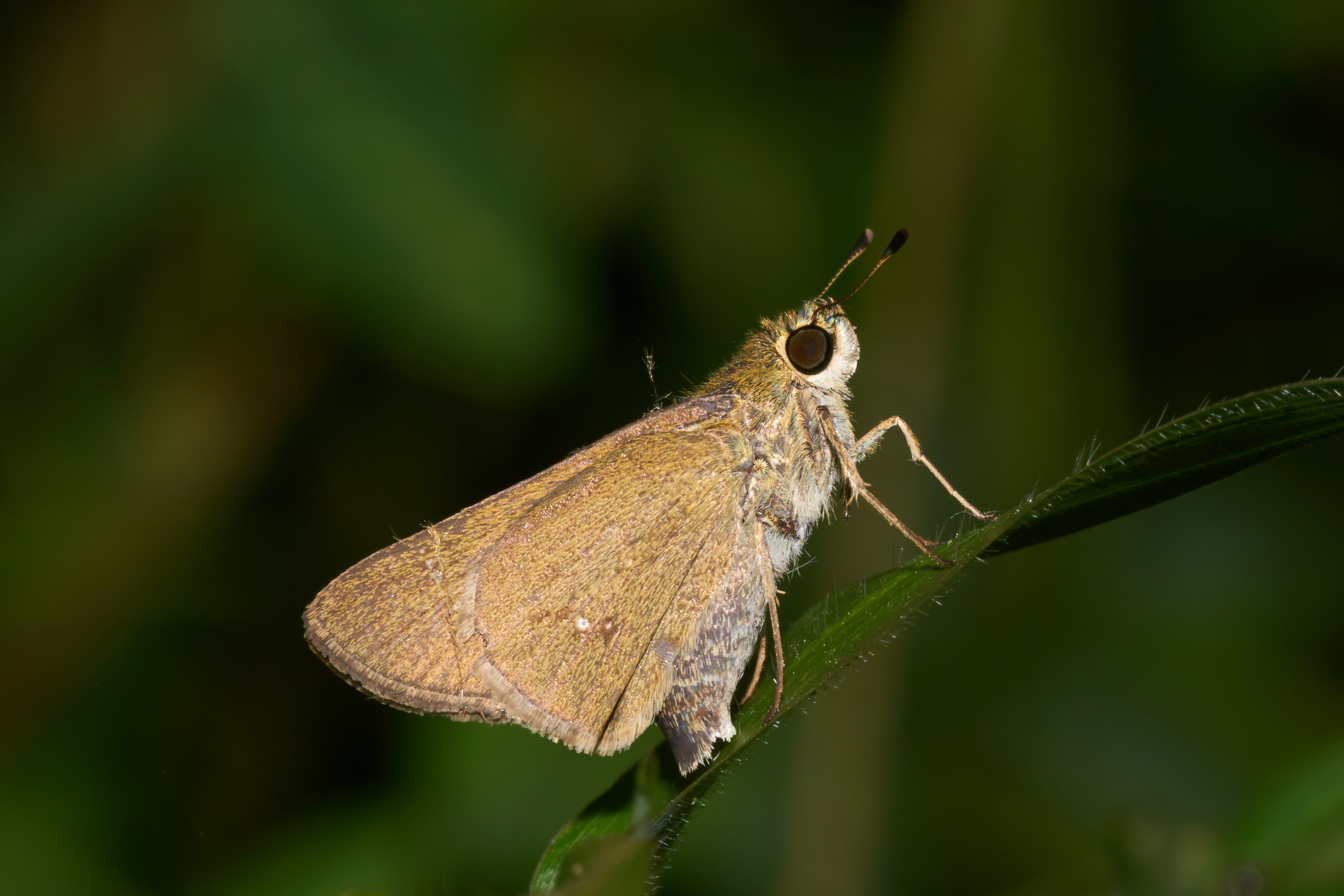
Ventral view

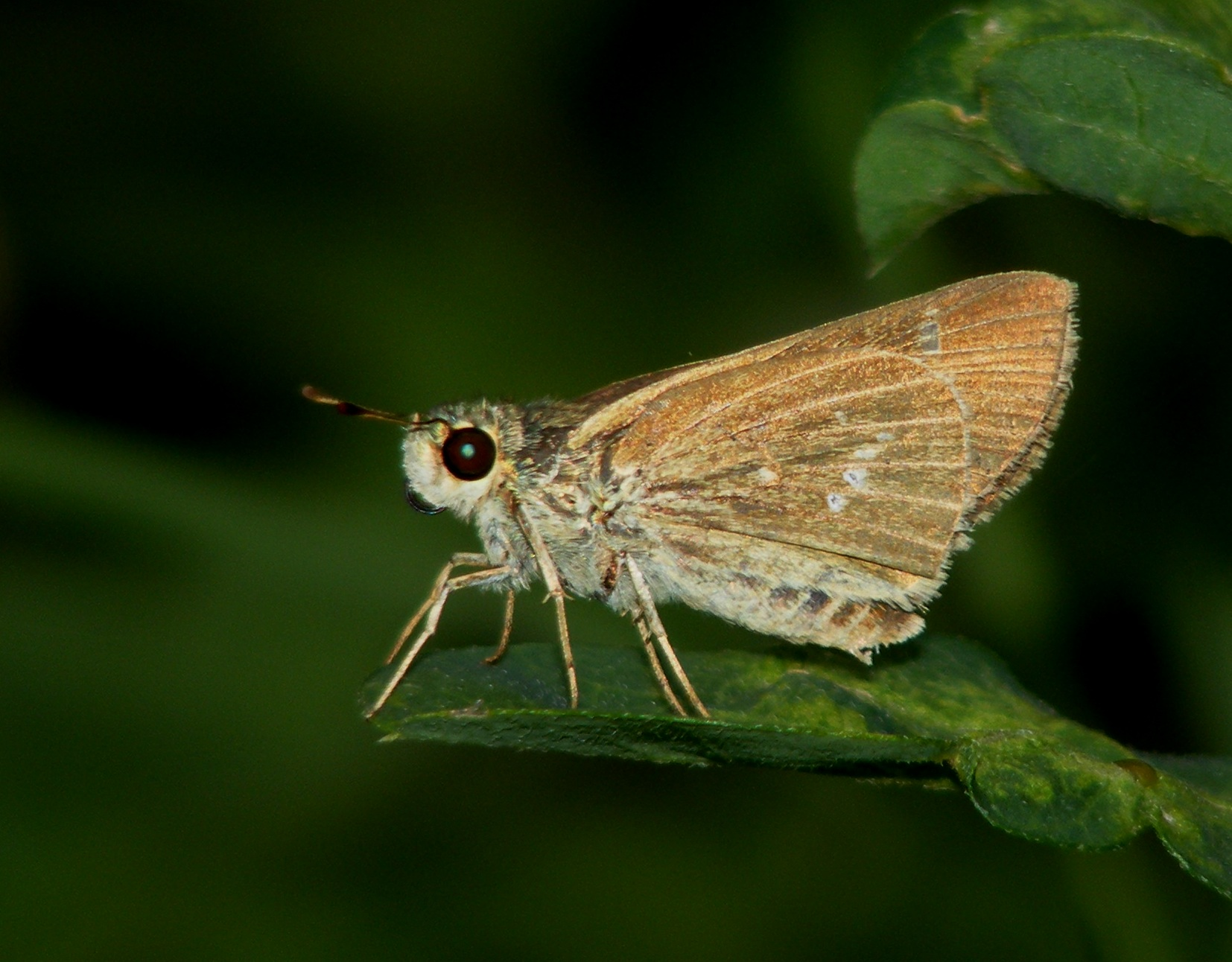
Ventral view

==== Genus: Pelopidas ====
===== Pelopidas agna (dark/obscure branded swift) =====
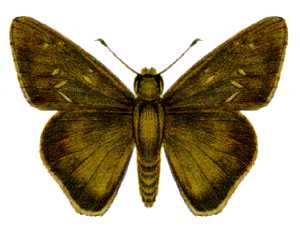
Illustration

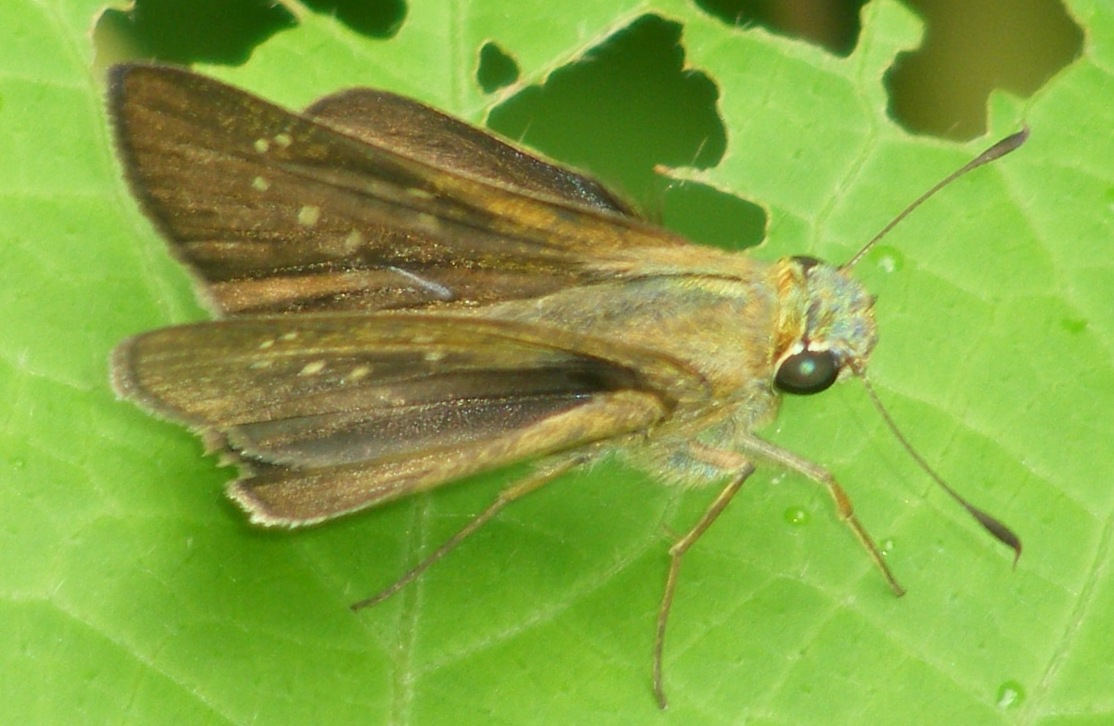
Dorsal view

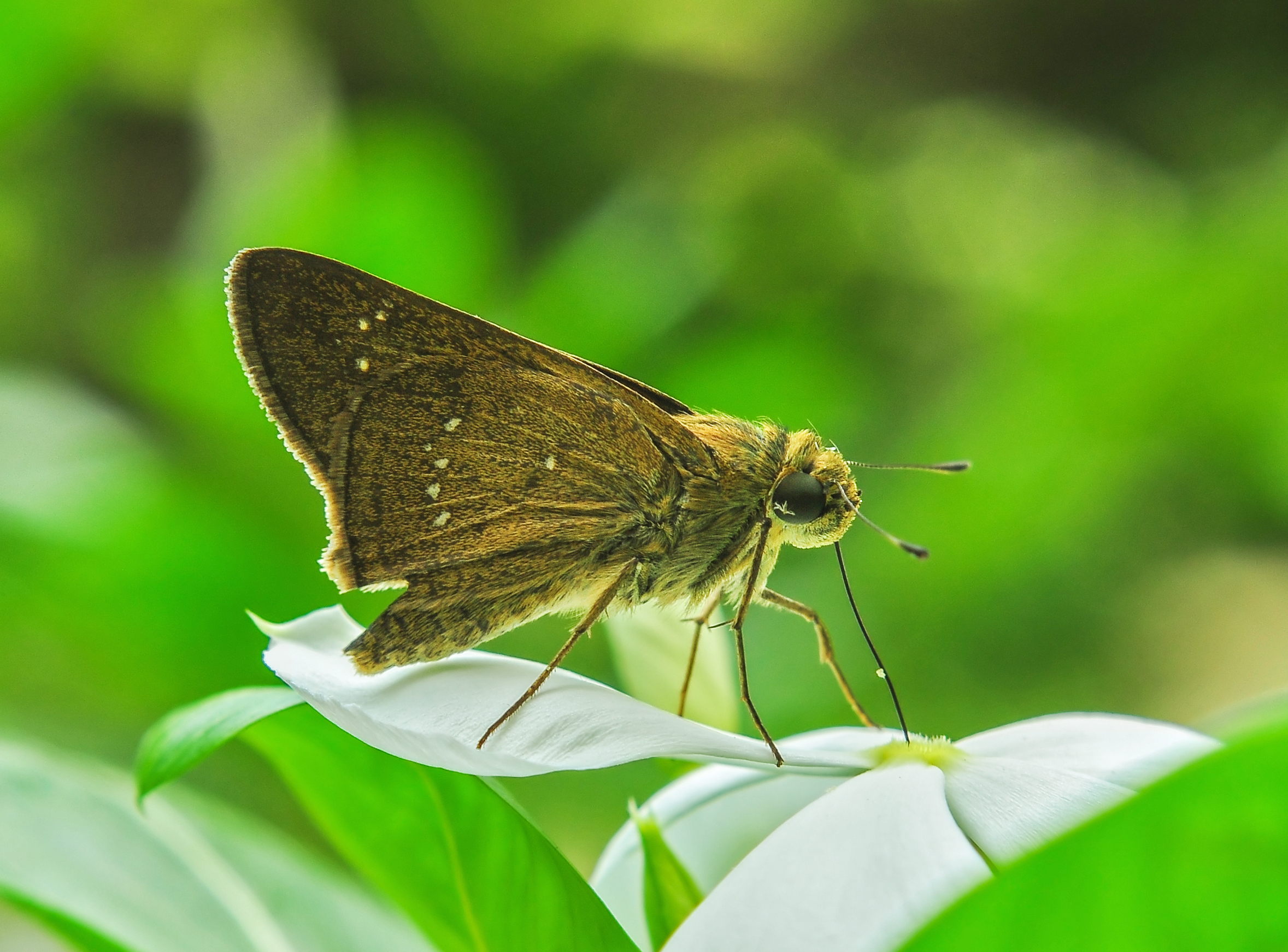
Ventral view

===== Pelopidas conjuncta (conjoined swift) =====
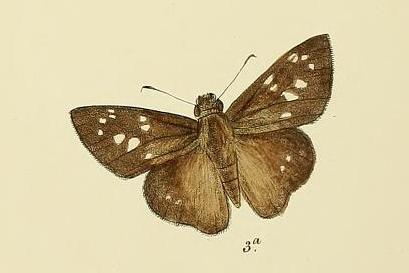
Illustration

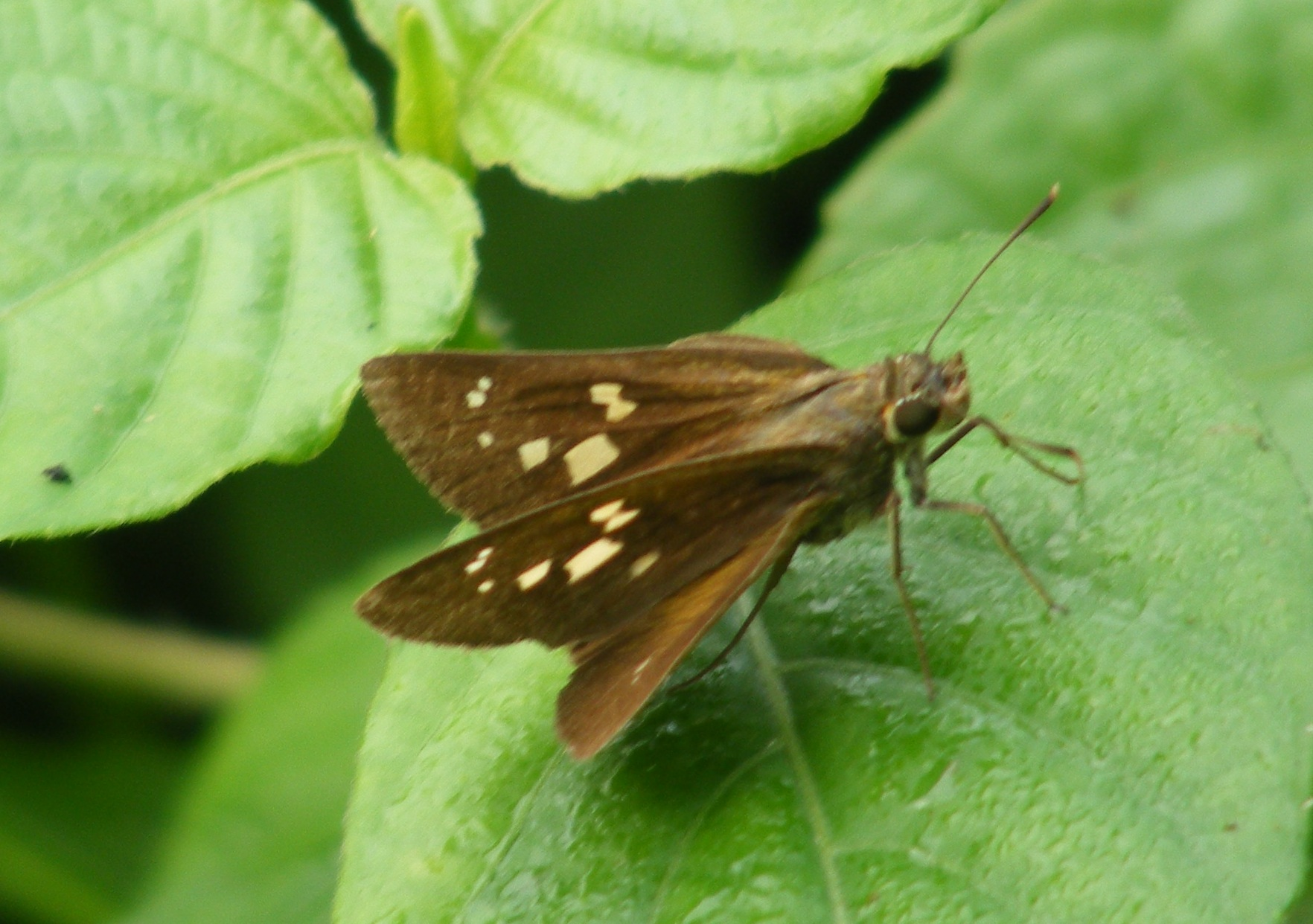
Dorsal view

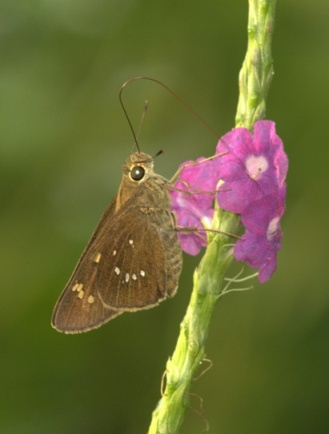
Ventral view

===== Pelopidas mathias (small branded swift) =====
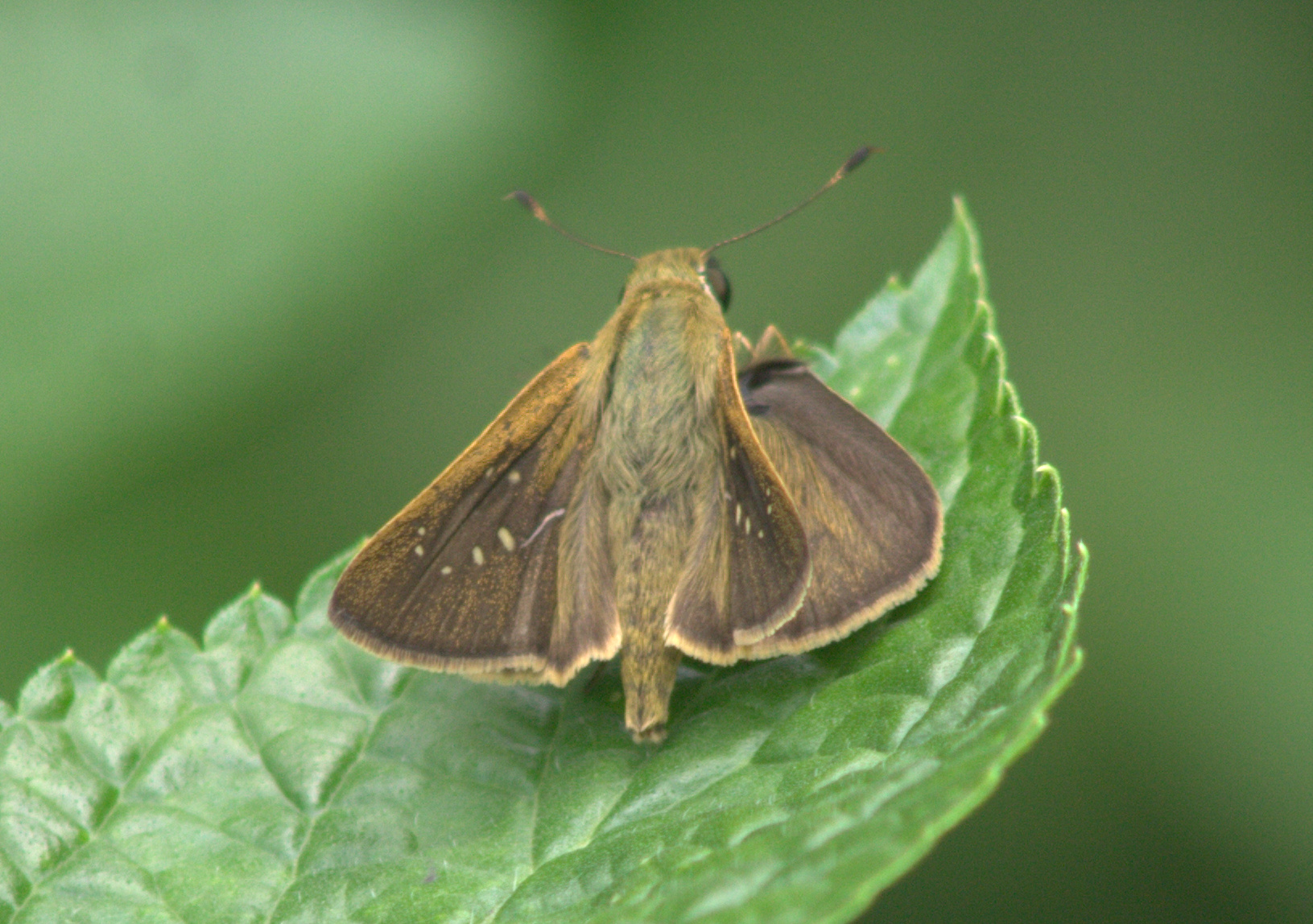
Dorsal view

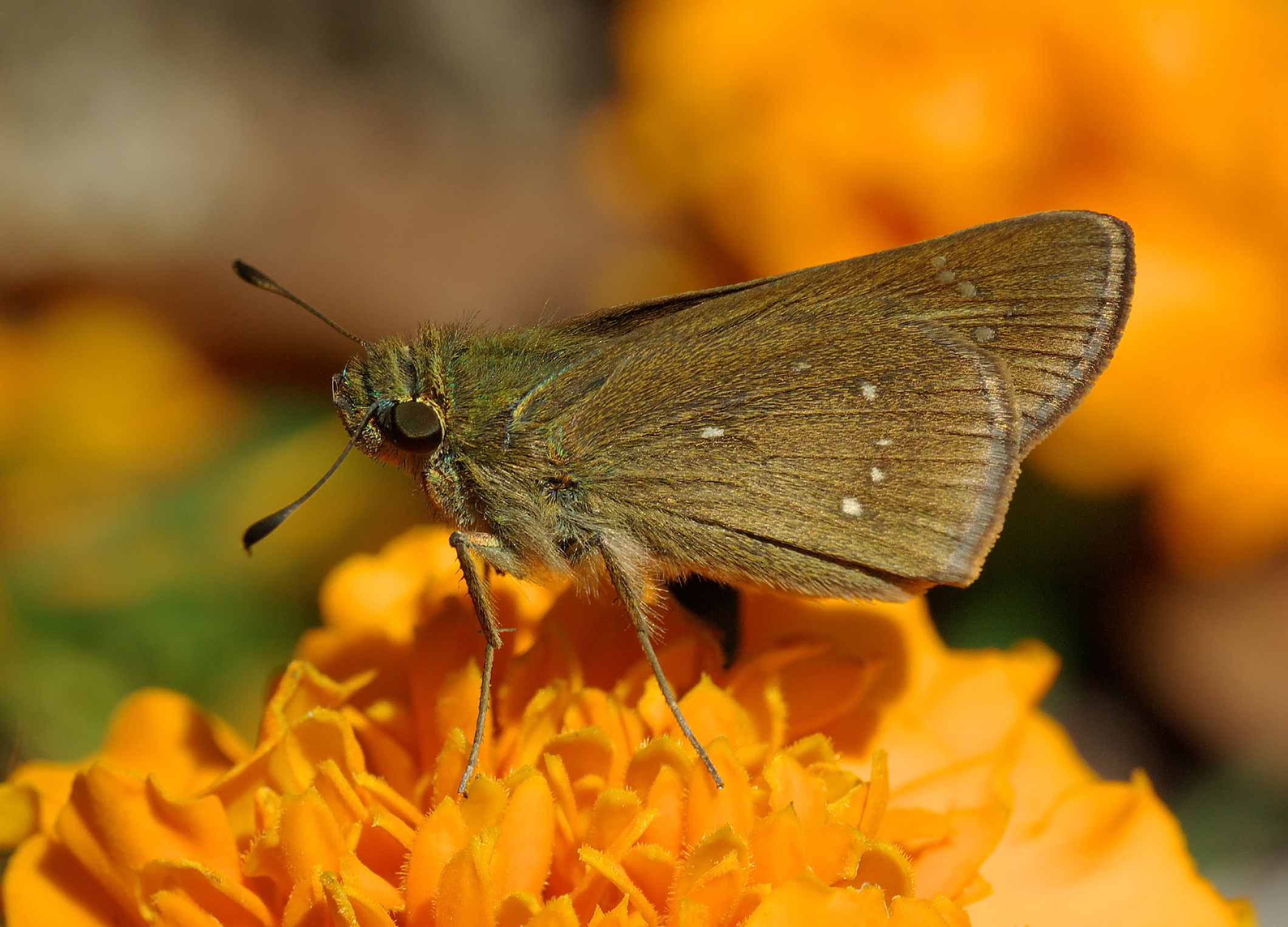
Ventral view

===== Pelopidas subochracea (large branded swift) =====
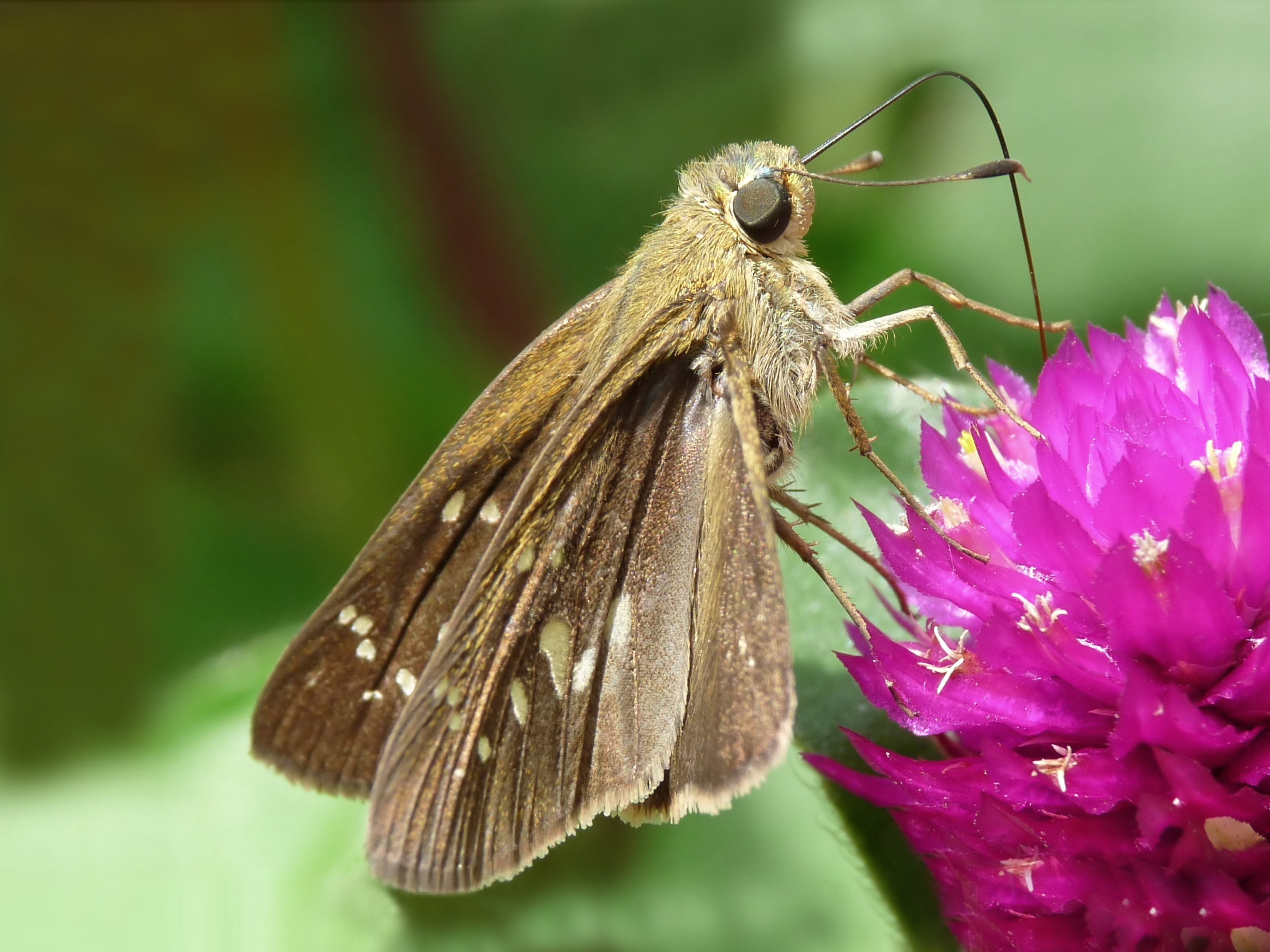
Dorsal view

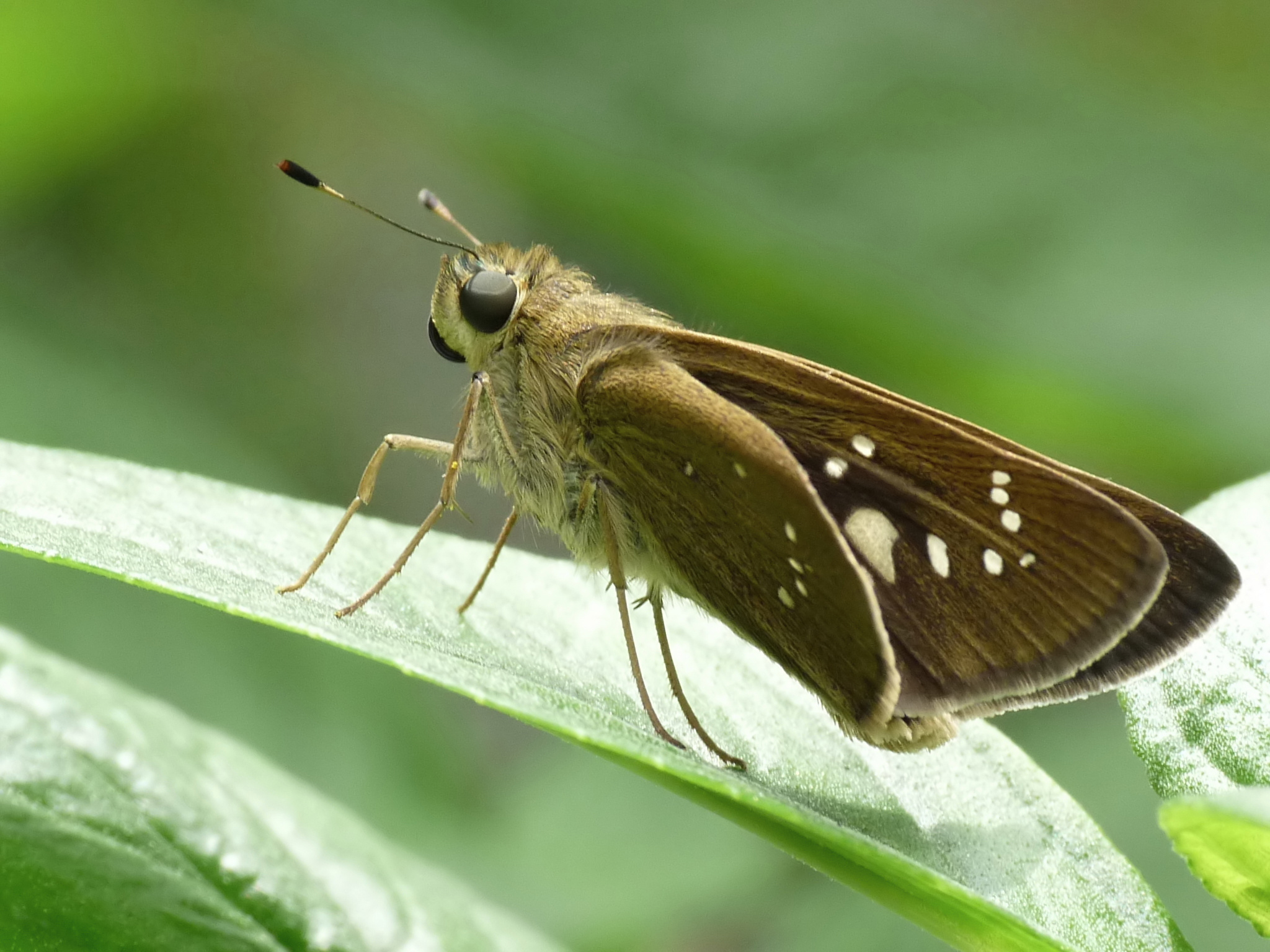
Ventral view

==== Genus: Polytremis ====
===== Polytremis lubricans (contiguous swift) =====
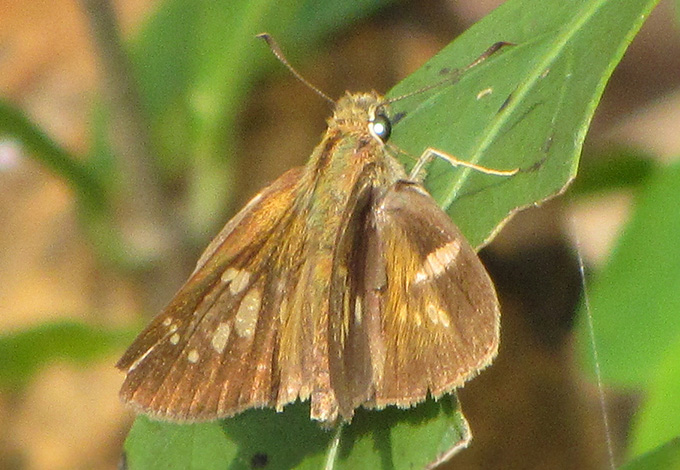
Dorsal view

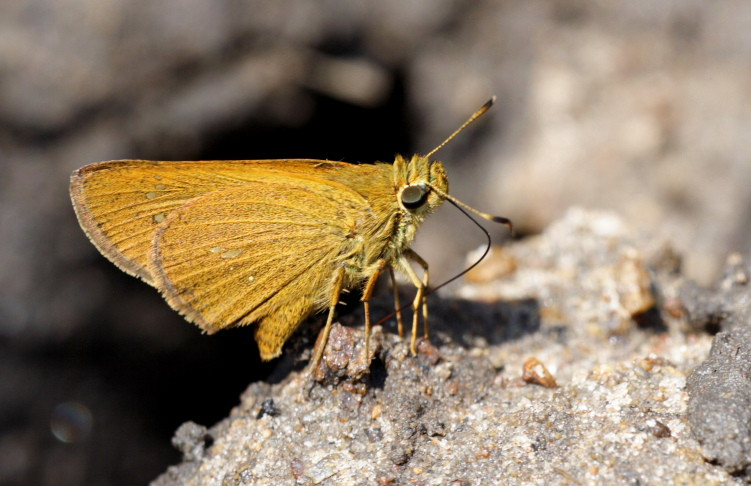
Ventral view

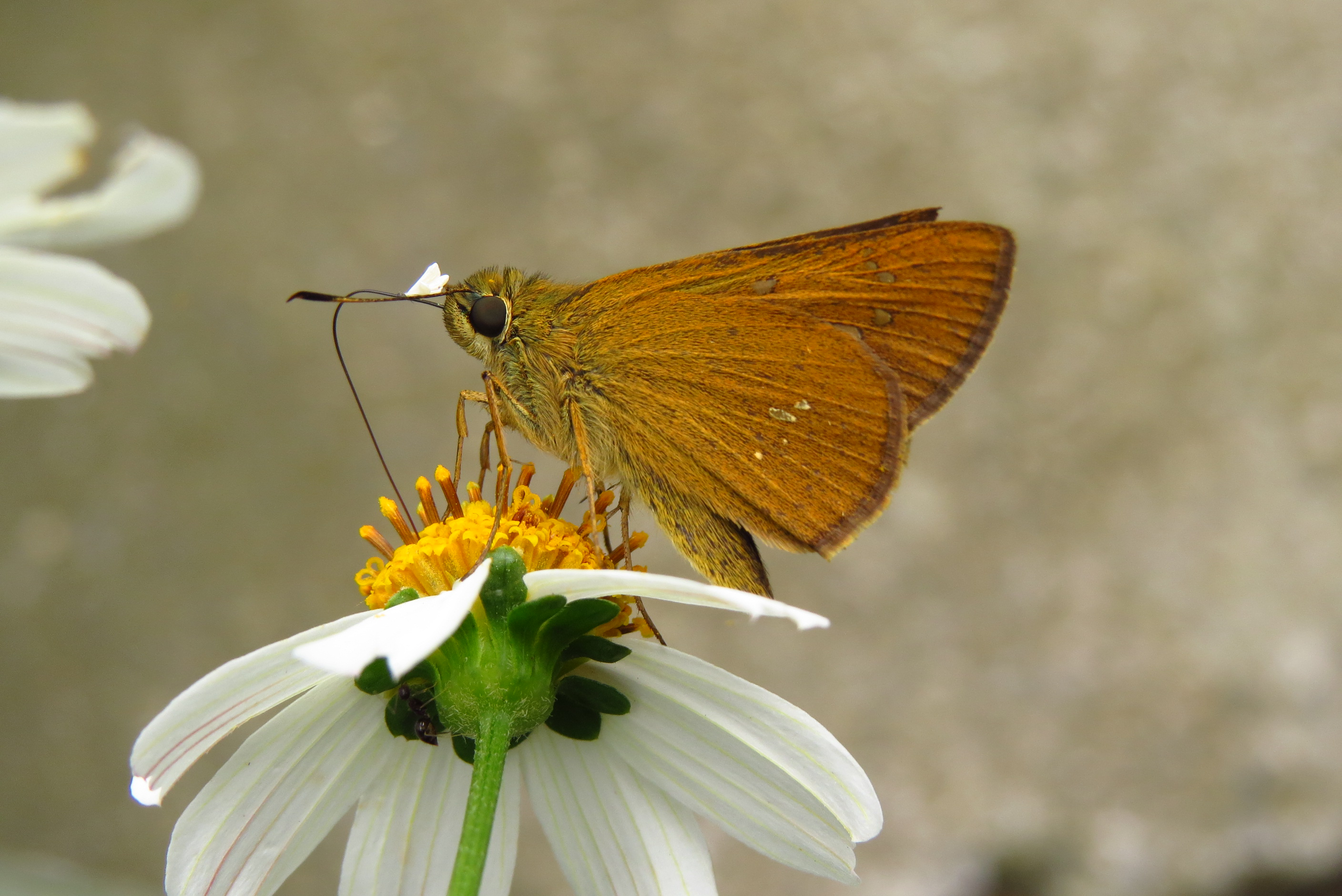
Ventral view

==== Genus: Potanthus ====
===== Potanthus pseudomaesa (Indian dart) =====
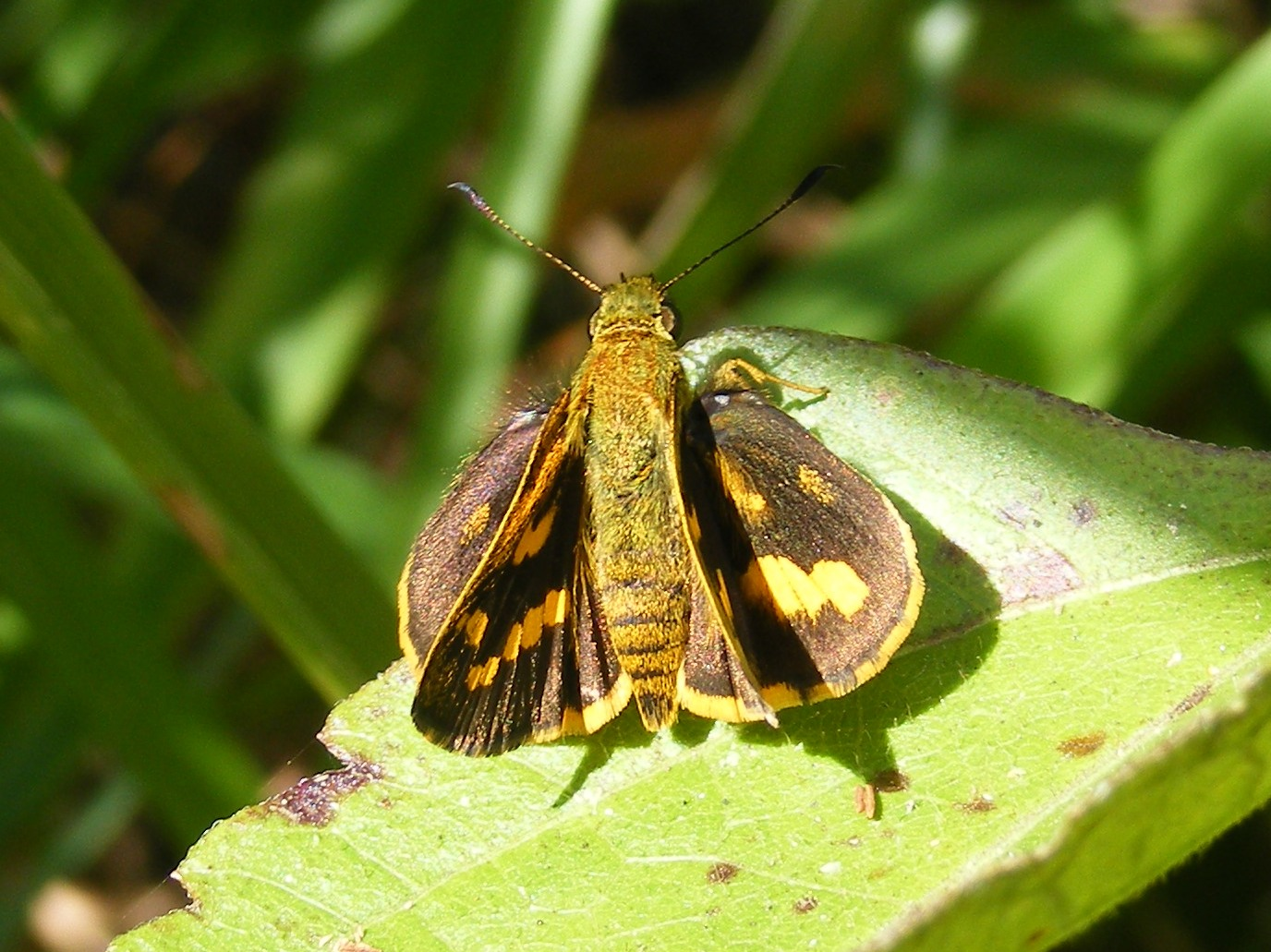
Dorsal view

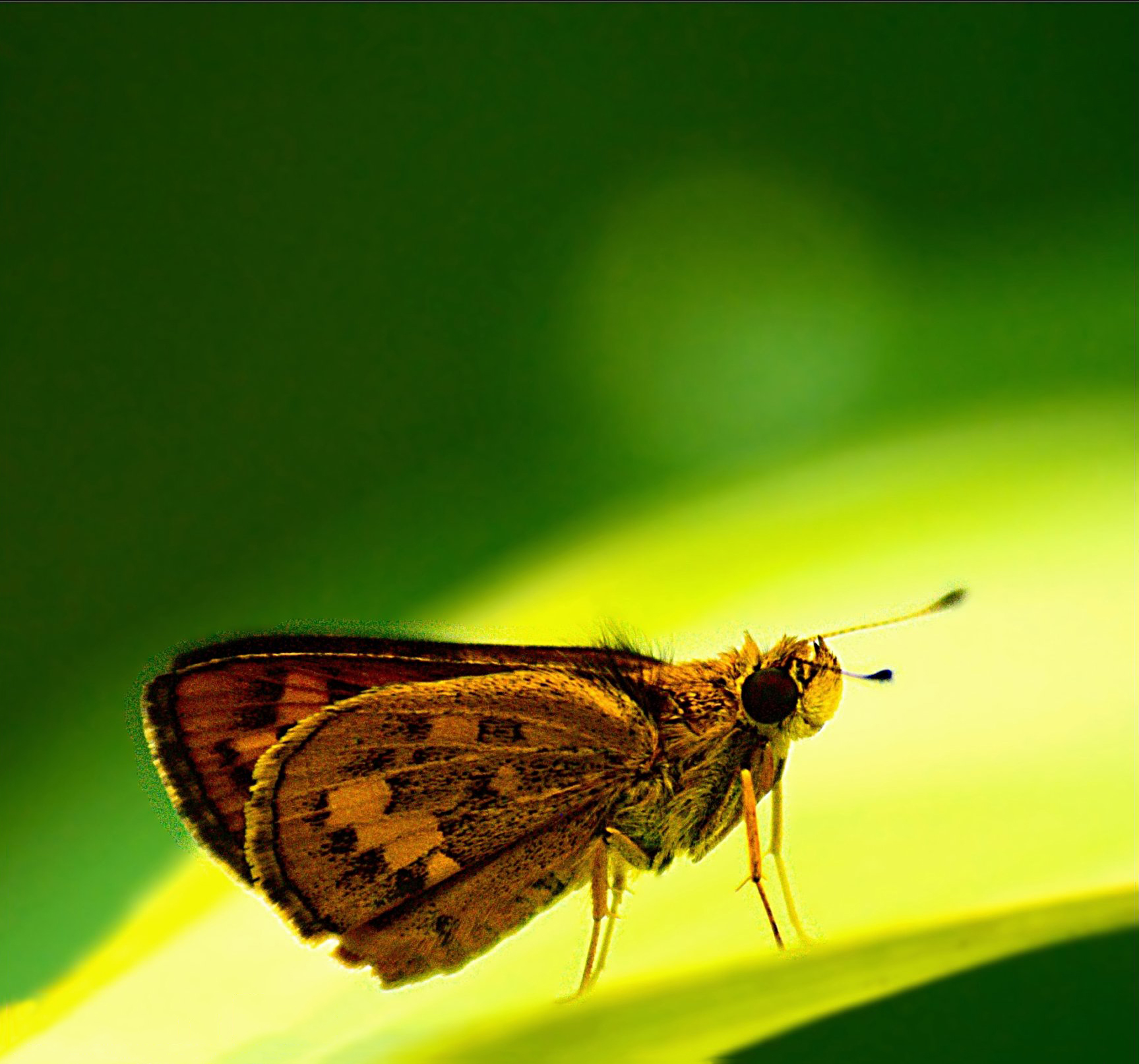
Ventral view

==== Genus: Psolos ====
===== Psolos fuligo (dusky partwing/coon) =====
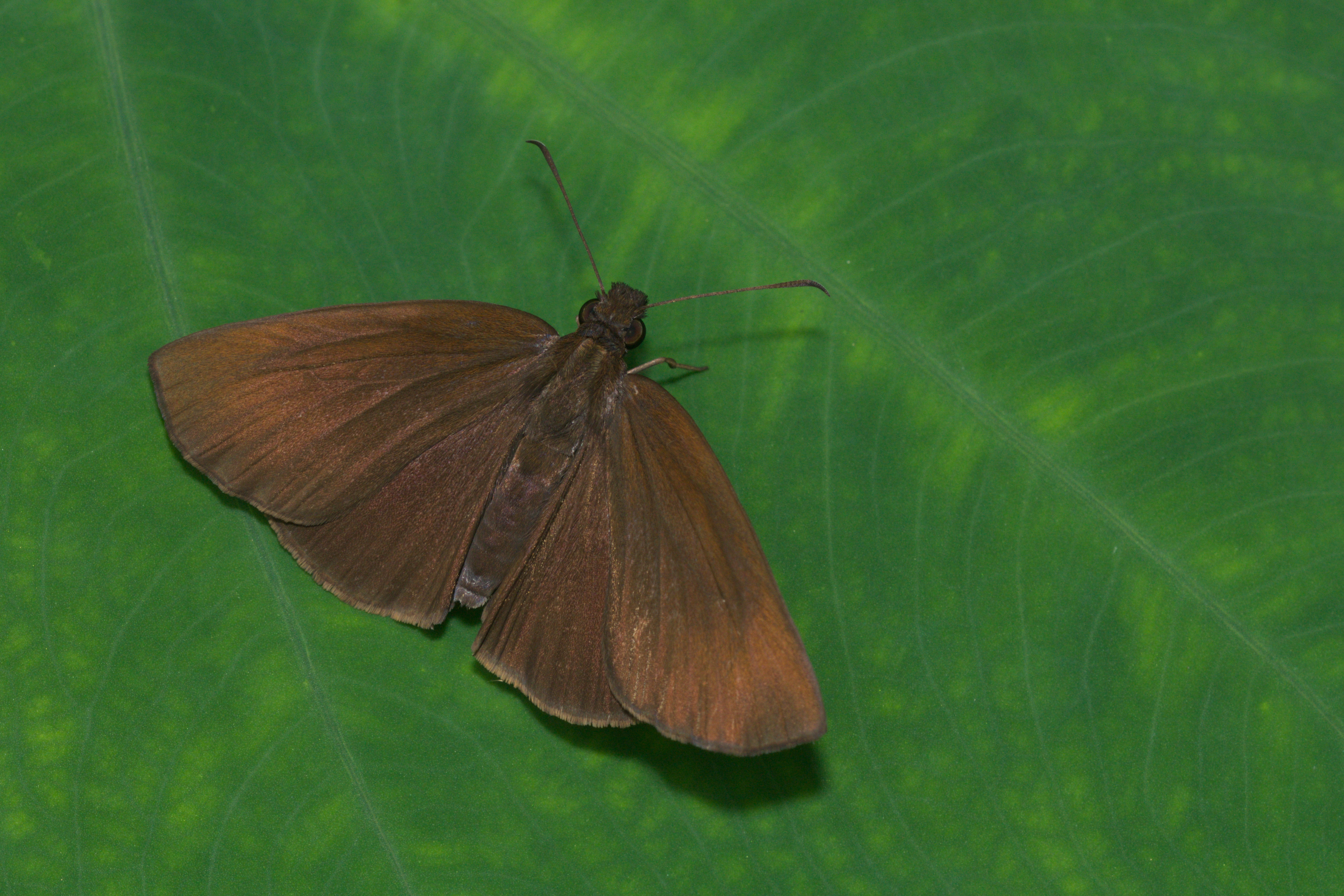
Dorsal view

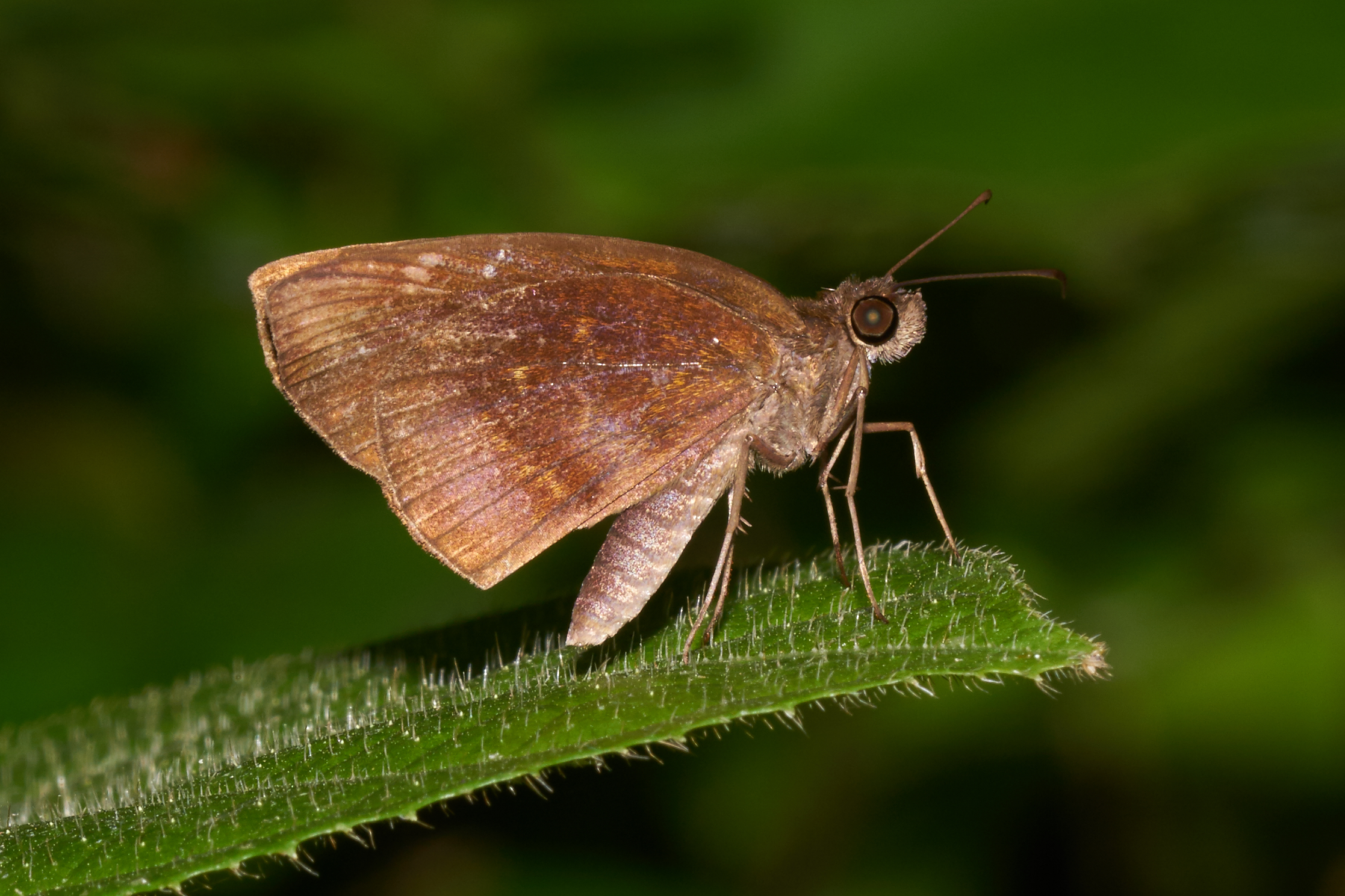
Ventral view

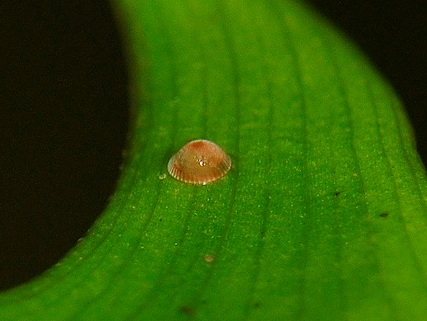
Egg

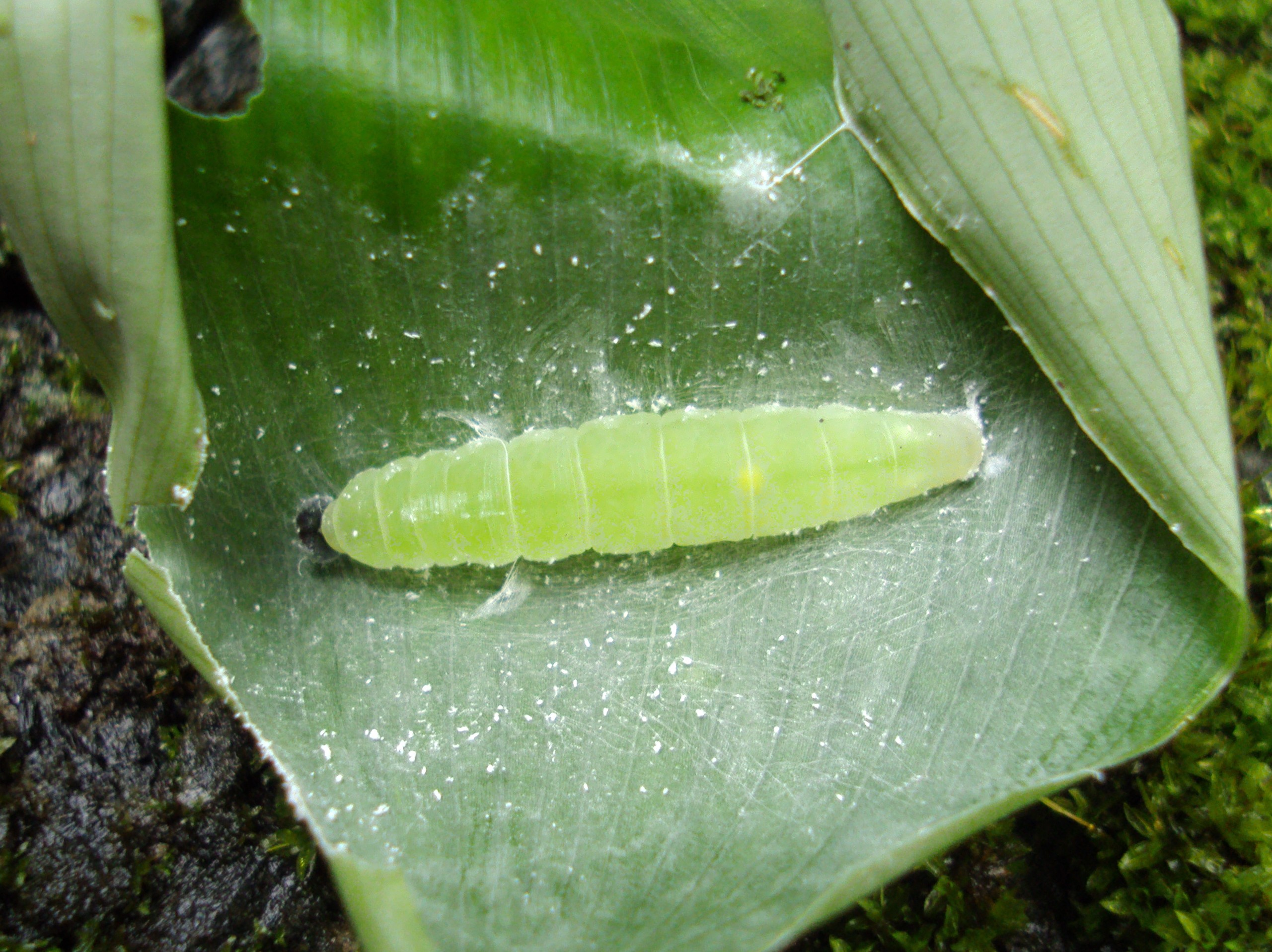
Larva

==== Genus: Quedara ====
===== Quedara basiflava (golden flitter) =====
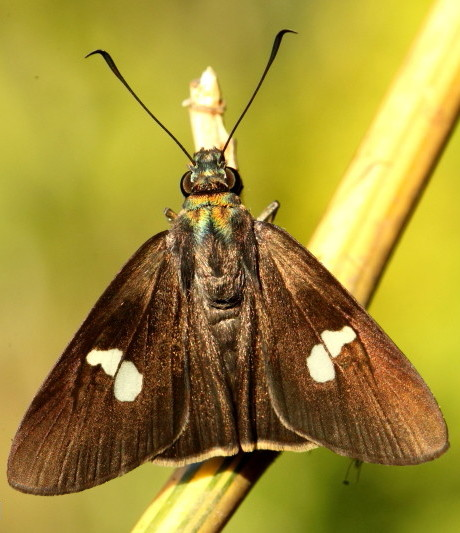
Dorsal view

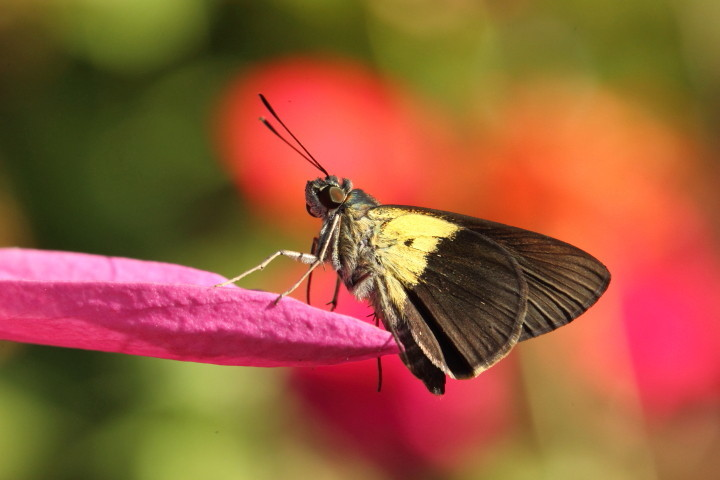
Ventral view

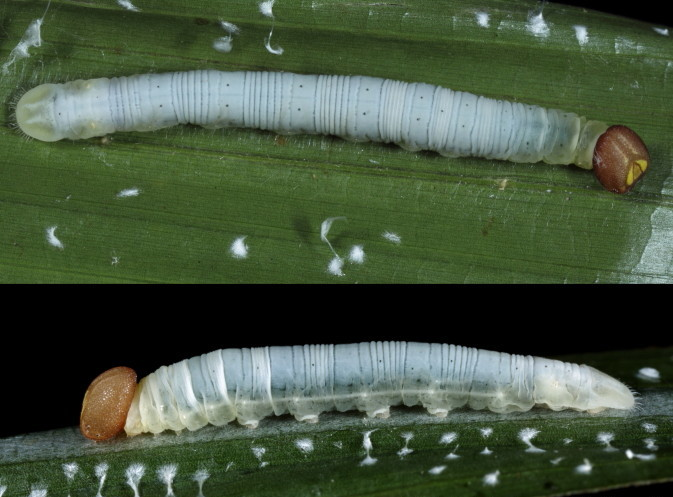
Larva

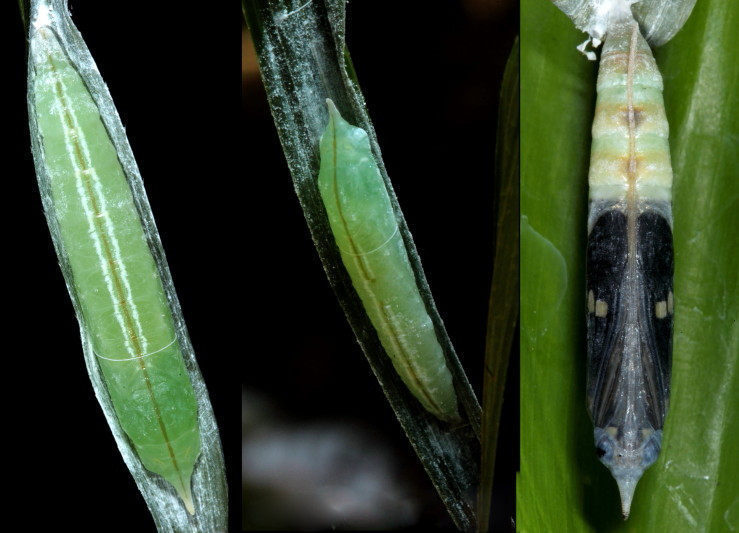
Pupa

==== Genus: Salanoemia ====
===== Salanoemia sala (maculate lancer) =====
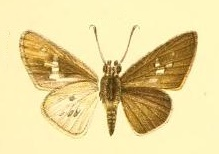
Illustration

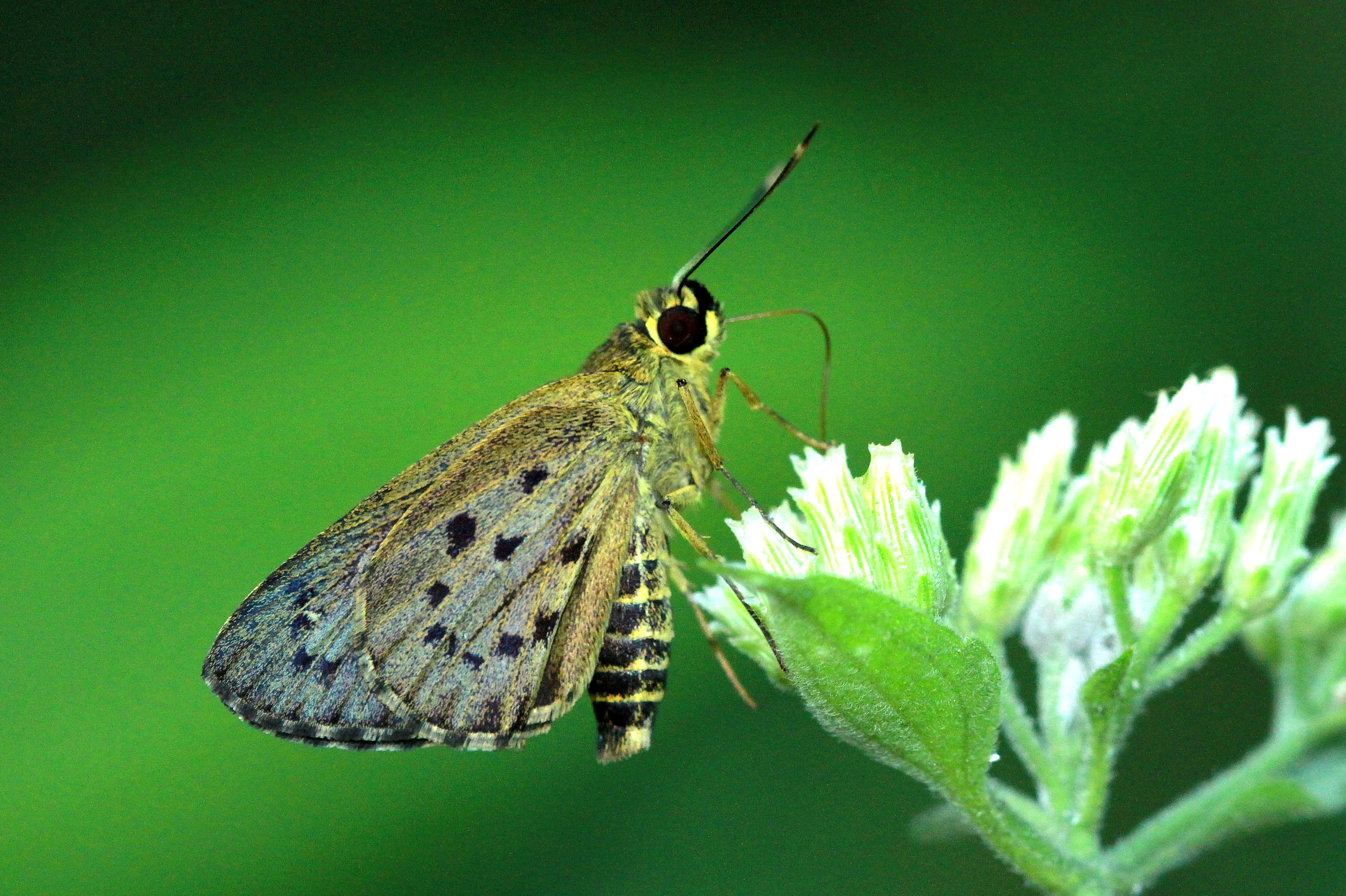
Ventral view

==== Genus: Sovia ====
===== Sovia hyrtacus (bicolour/white-branded ace) =====
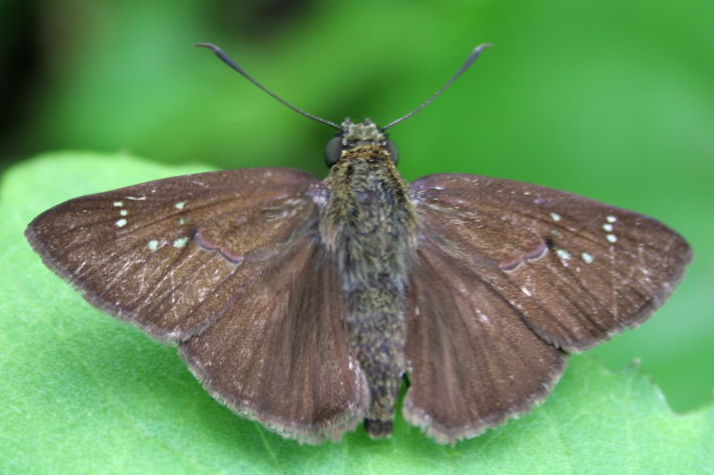
Dorsal view

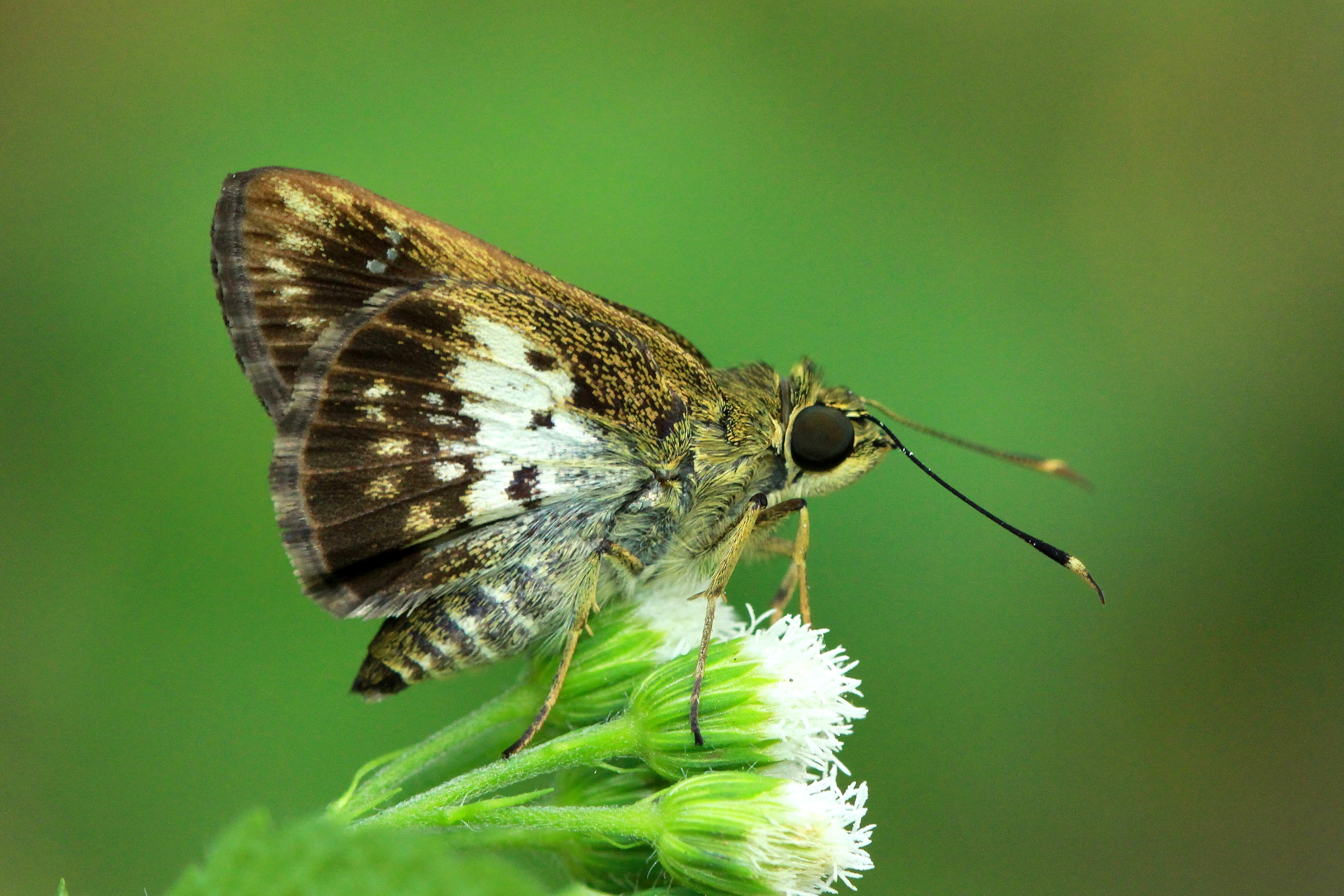
Ventral view

==== Genus: Suastus ====
===== Suastus gremius (Indian palm bob) =====
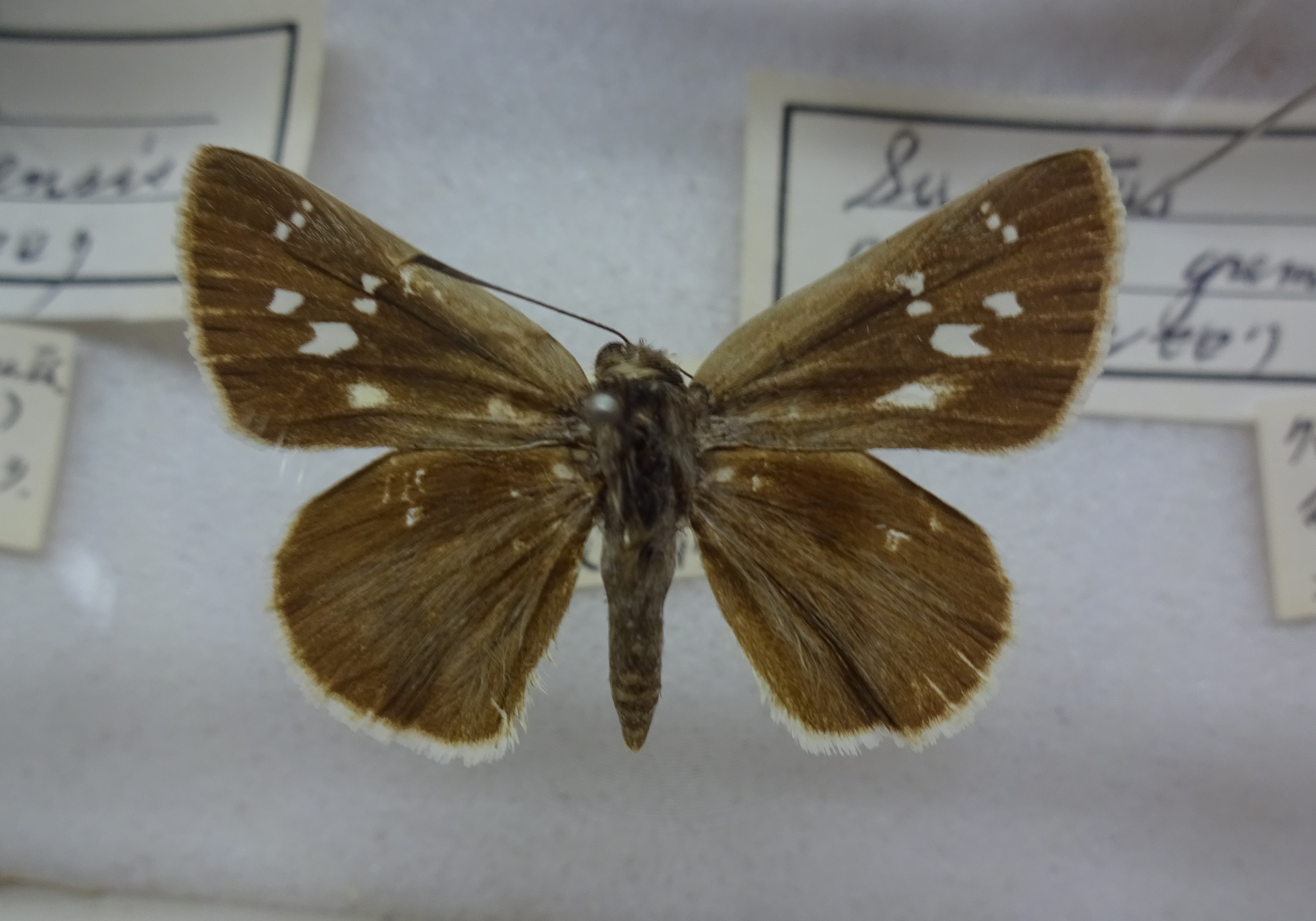
Museum specimen

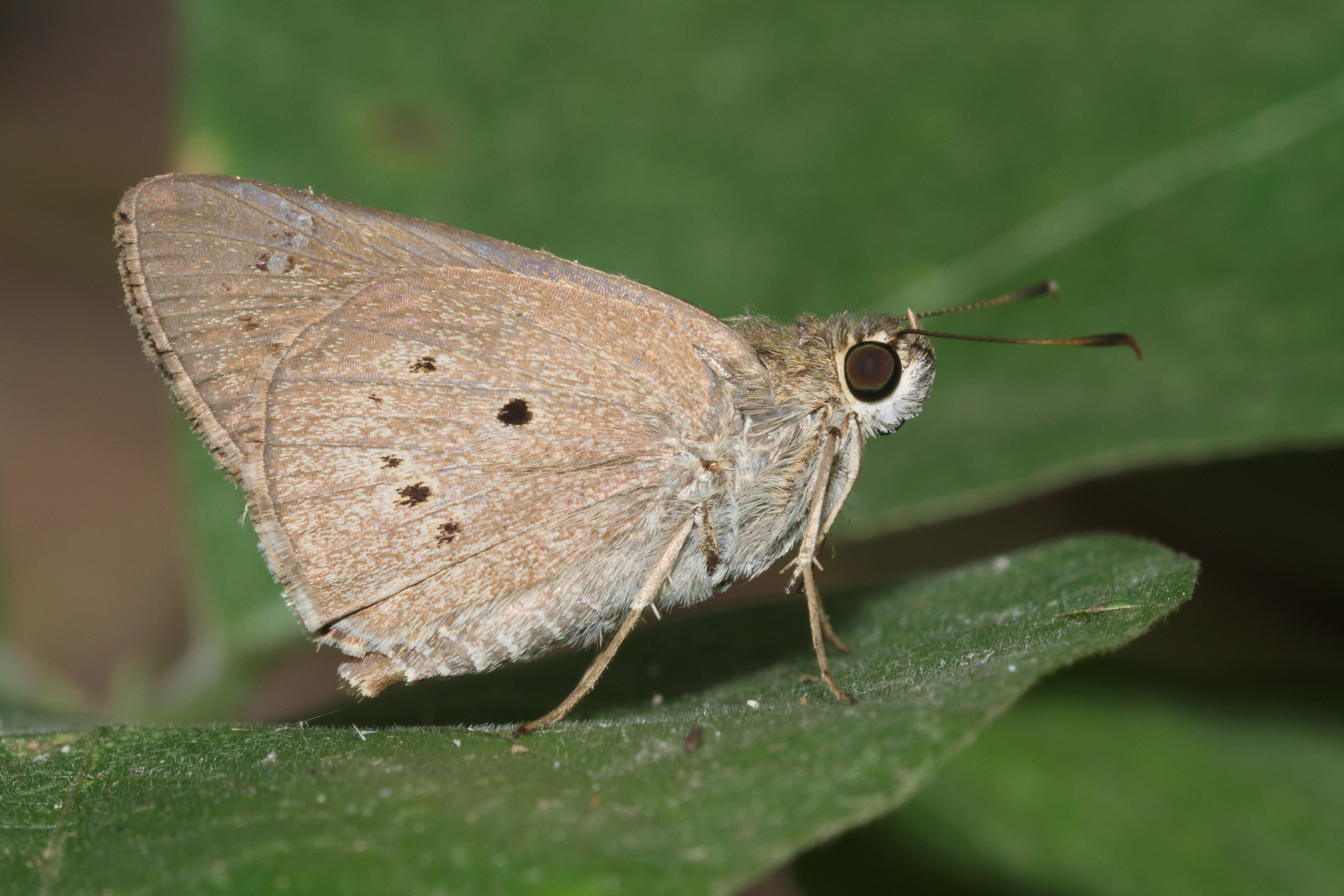
Ventral view

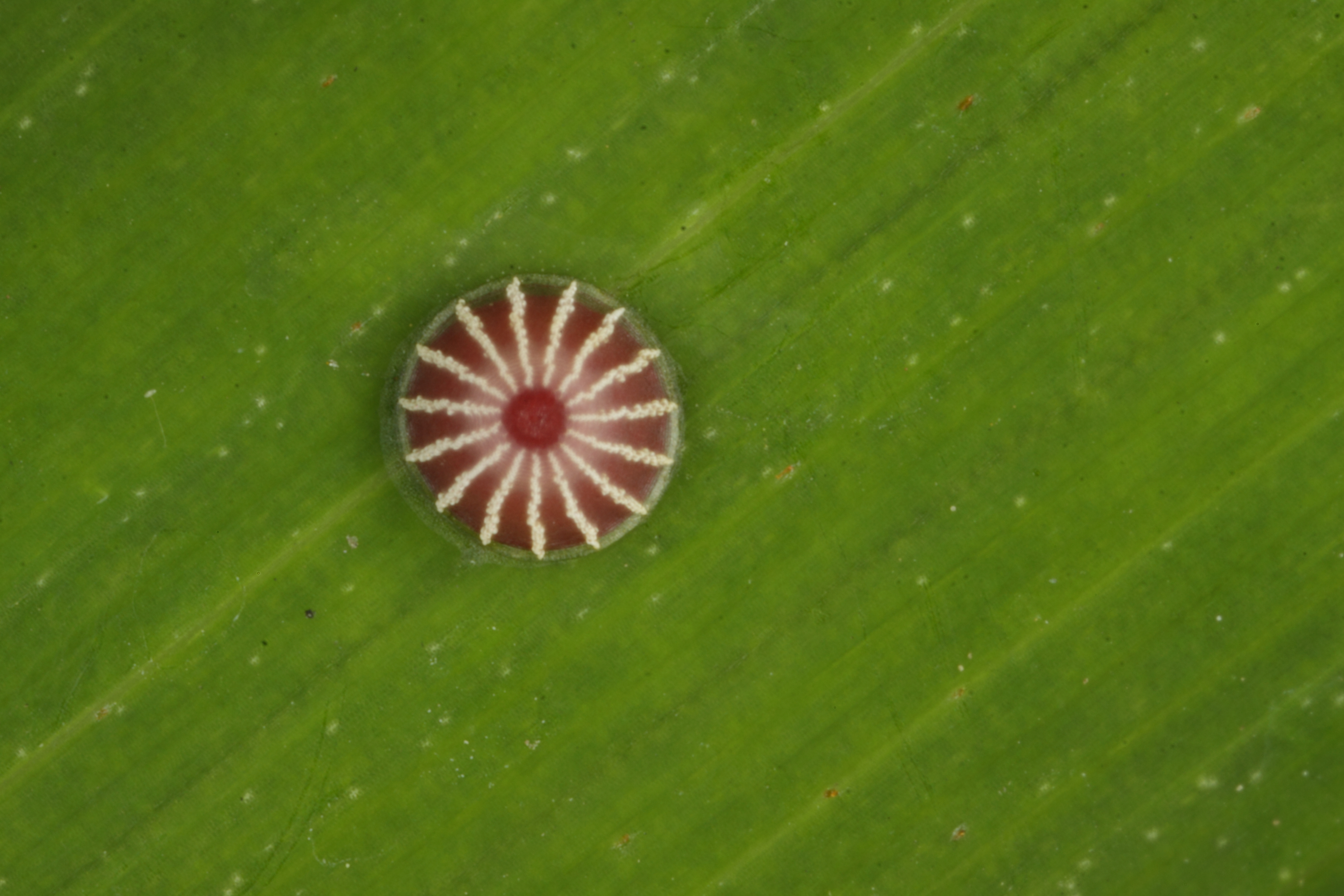
Egg

===== Suastus minuta (small palm bob) =====
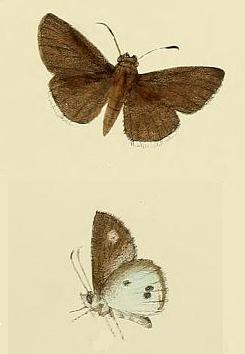
Illustration

==== Genus: Taractrocera ====
===== Taractrocera ceramas (Tamil grass dart) =====
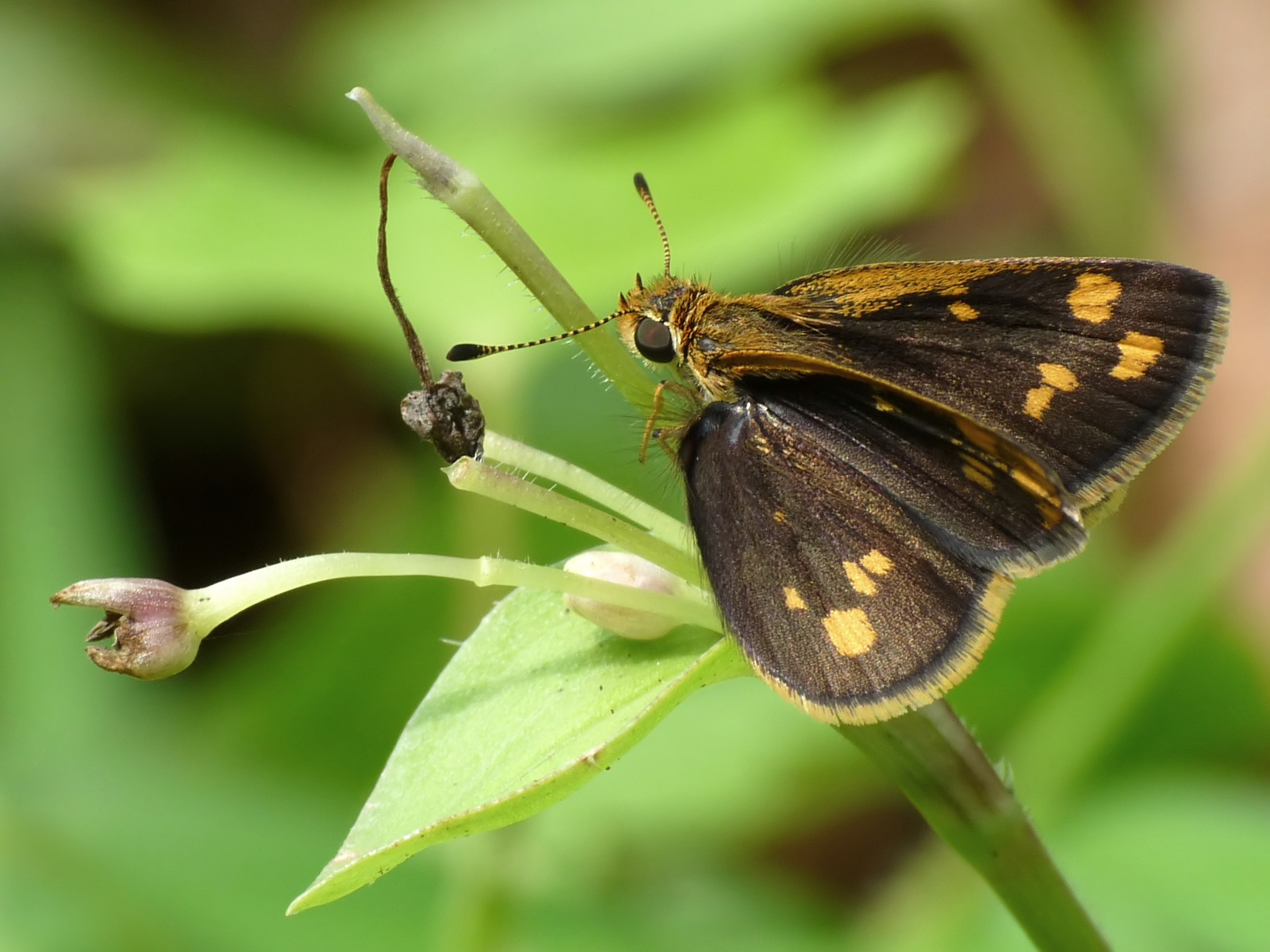
Dorsal view

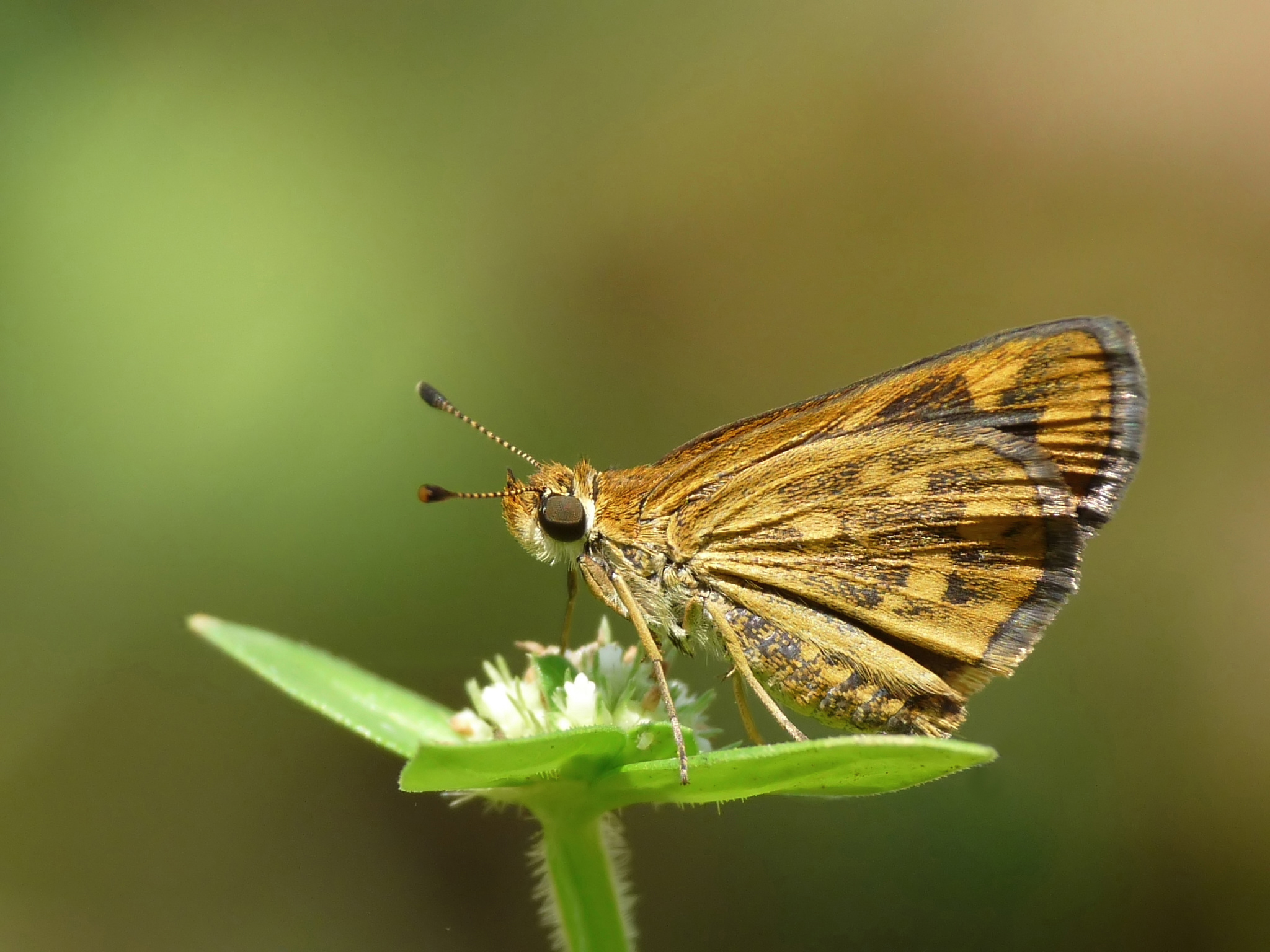
Ventral view

===== Taractrocera maevius (common grass dart) =====
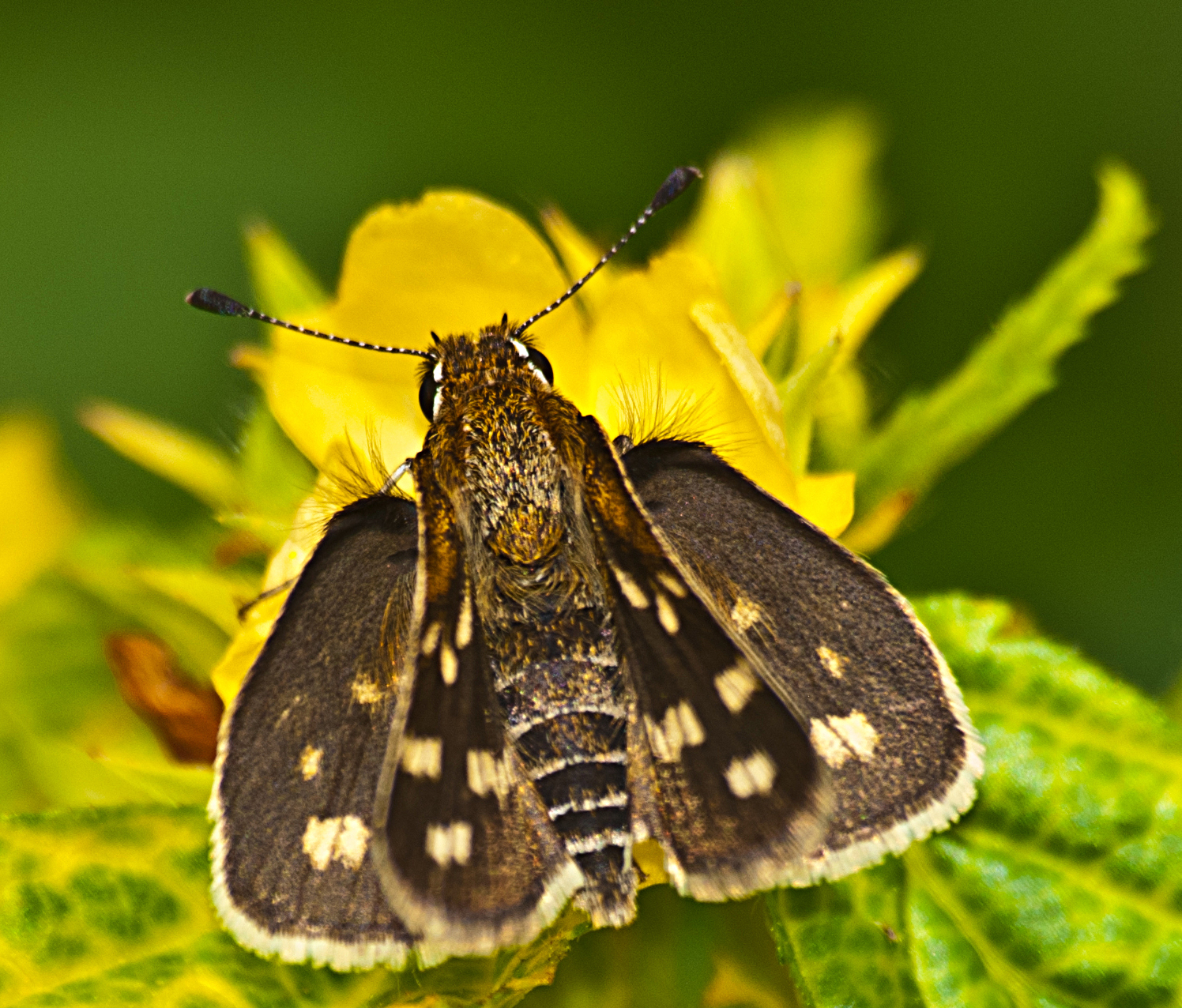
Dorsal view

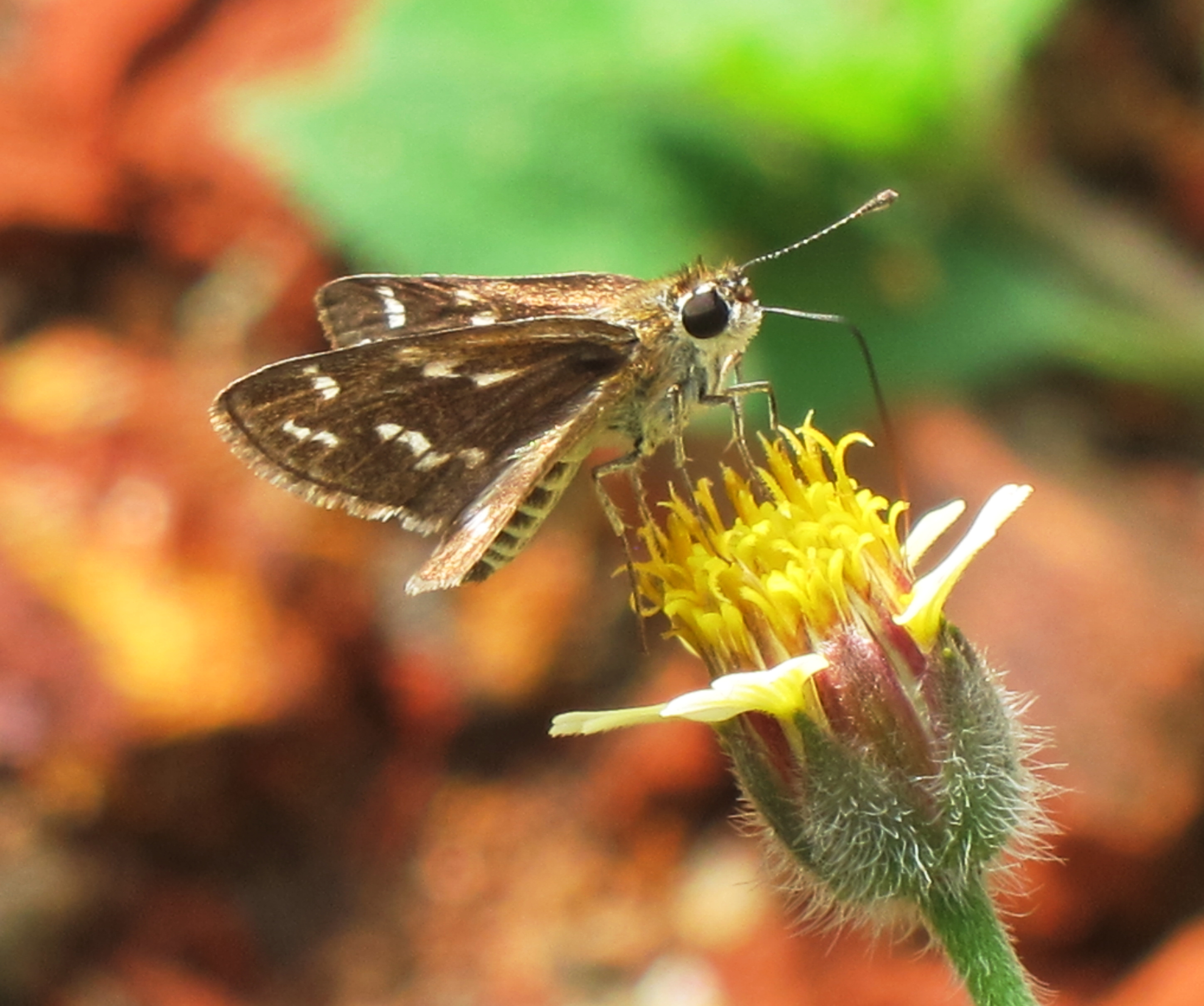
Dorsal view

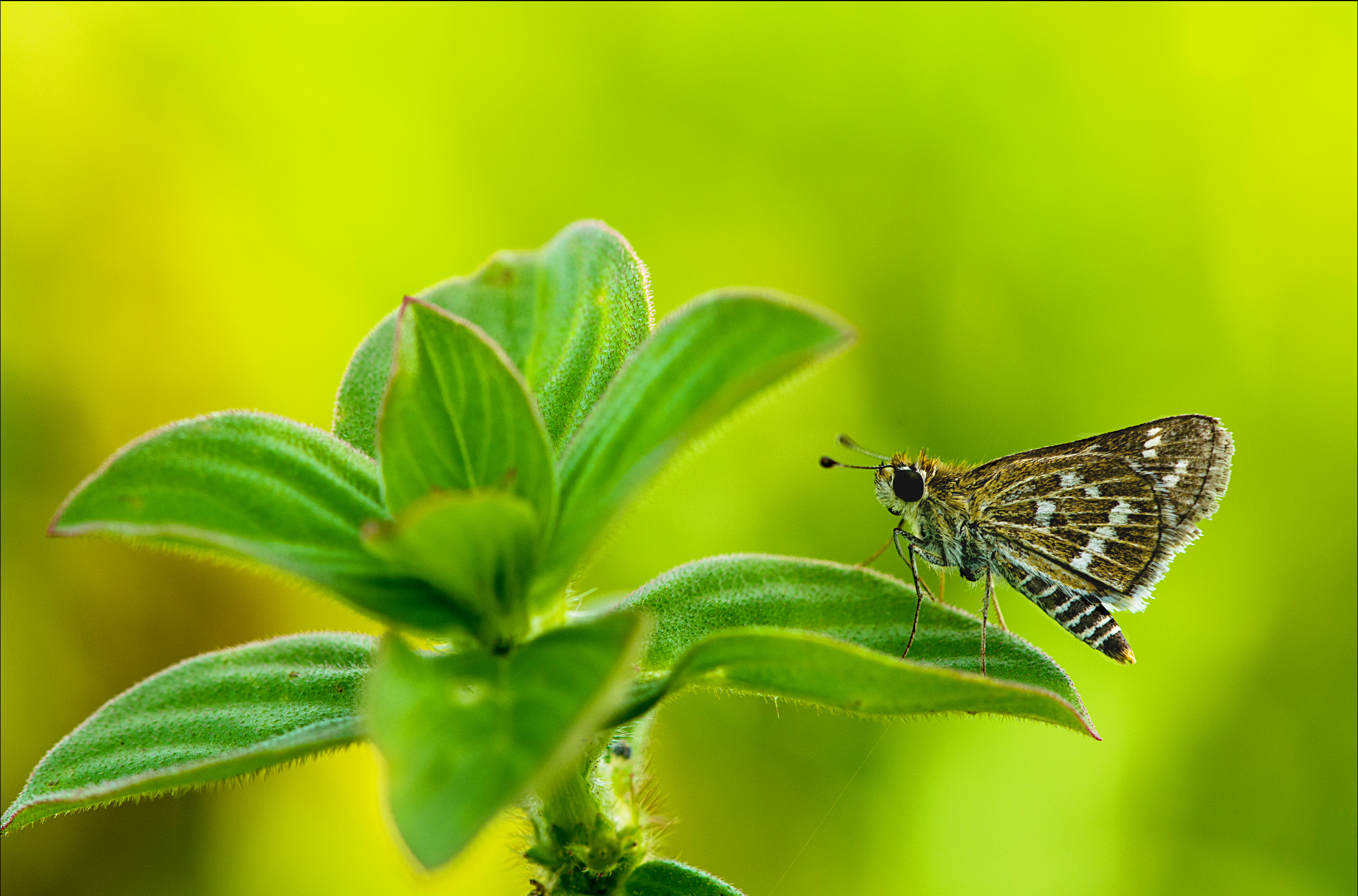
Ventral view

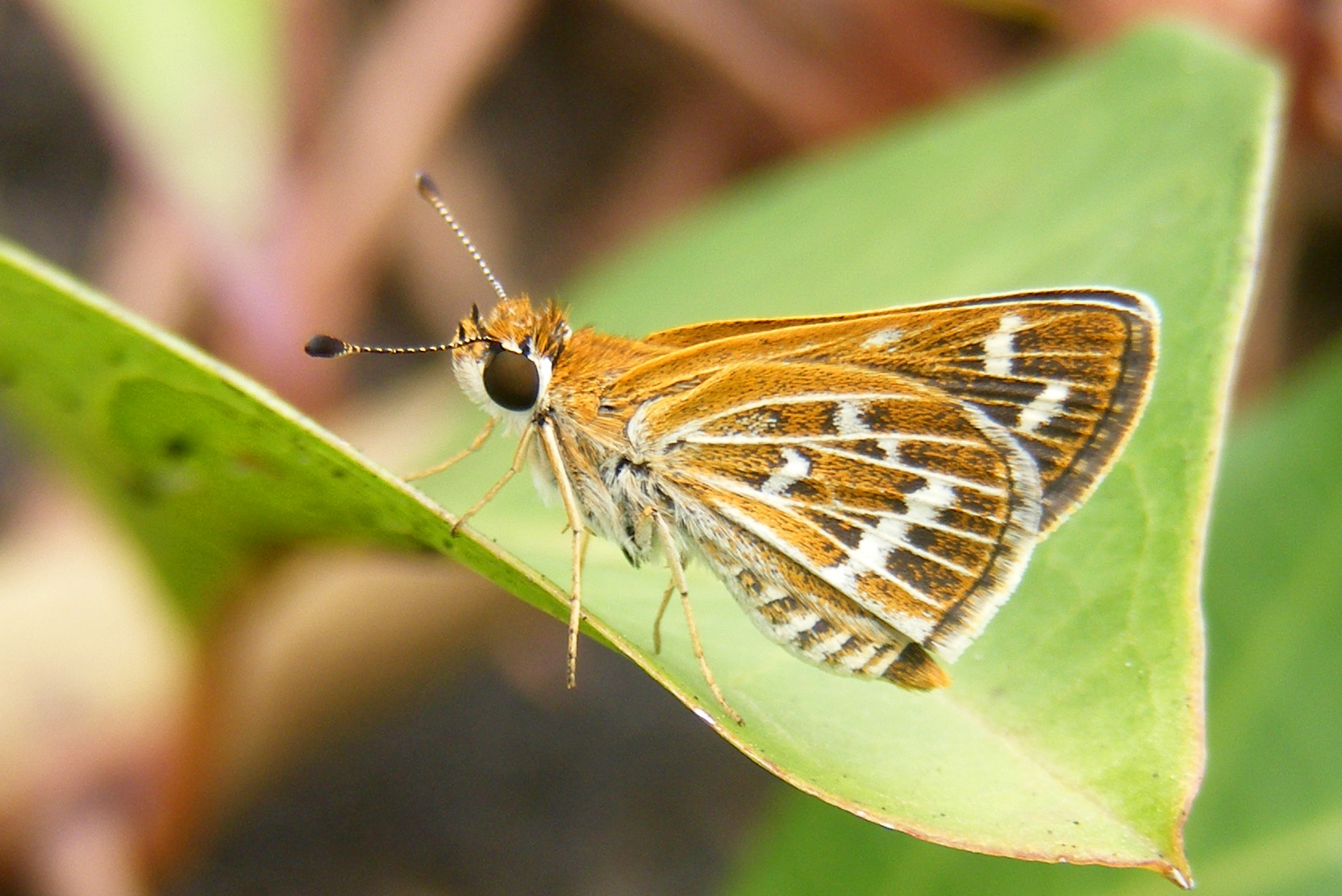
Ventral view

==== Genus: Telicota ====
===== Telicota bambusae (dark palm dart) =====
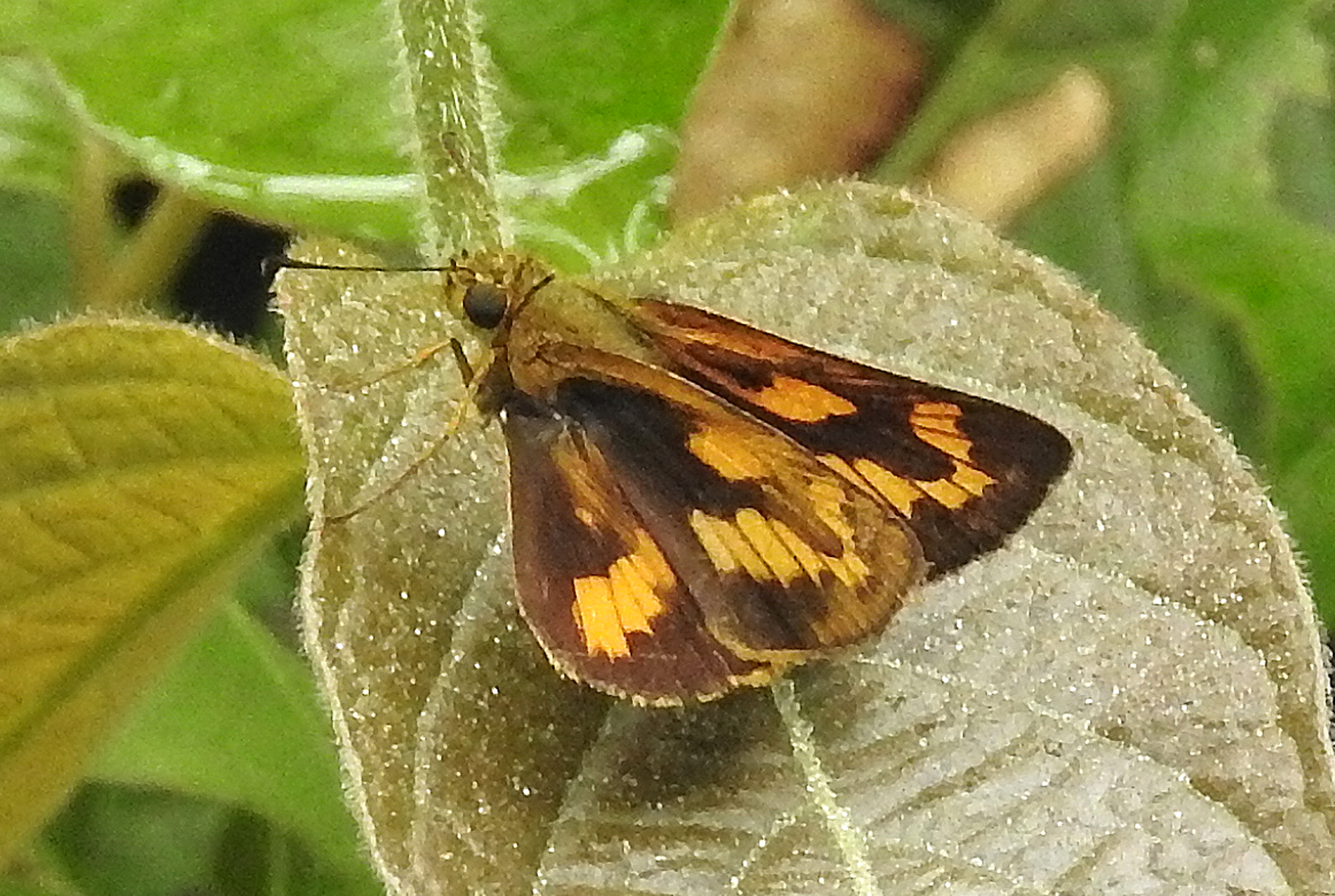
Dorsal view

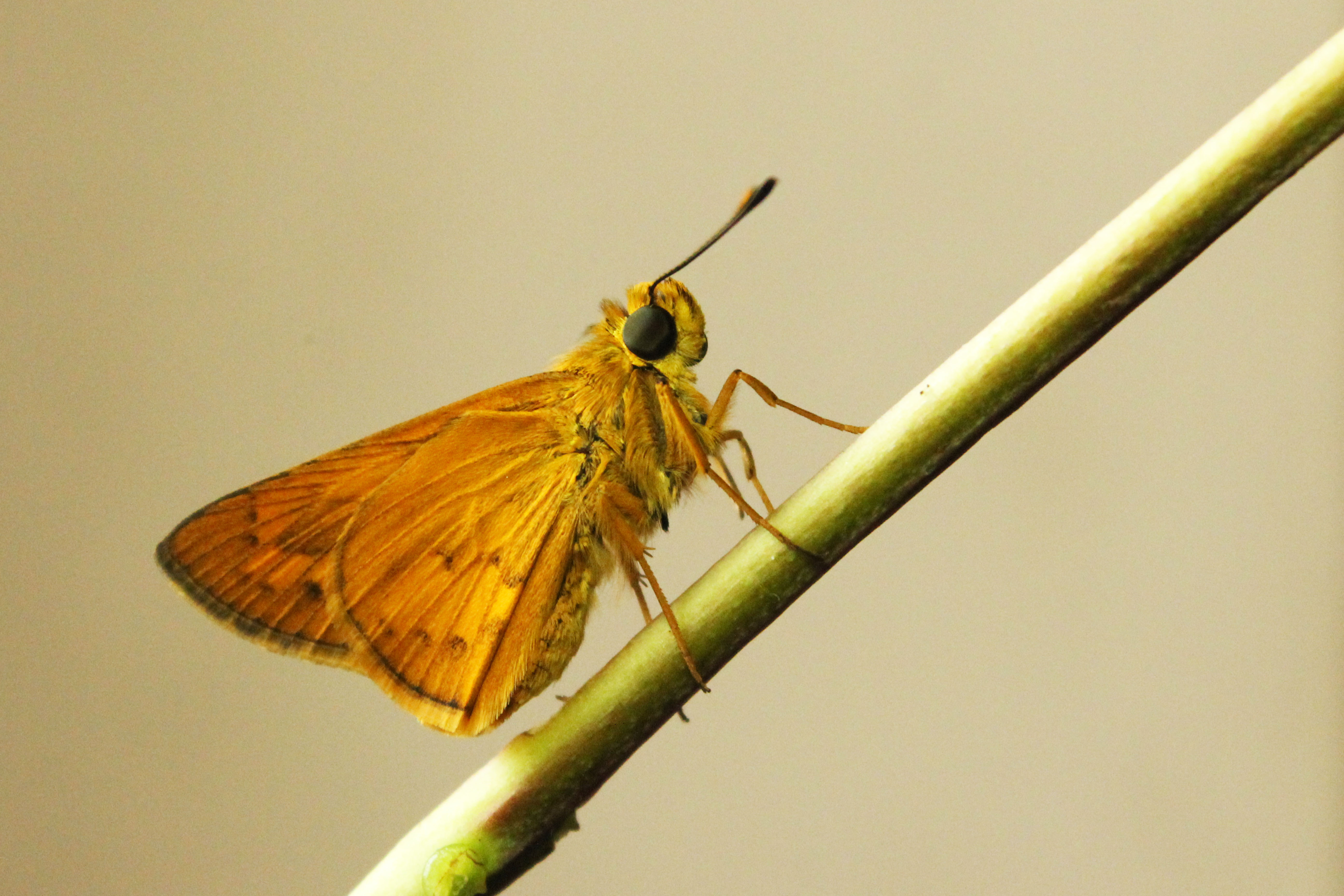
Ventral view

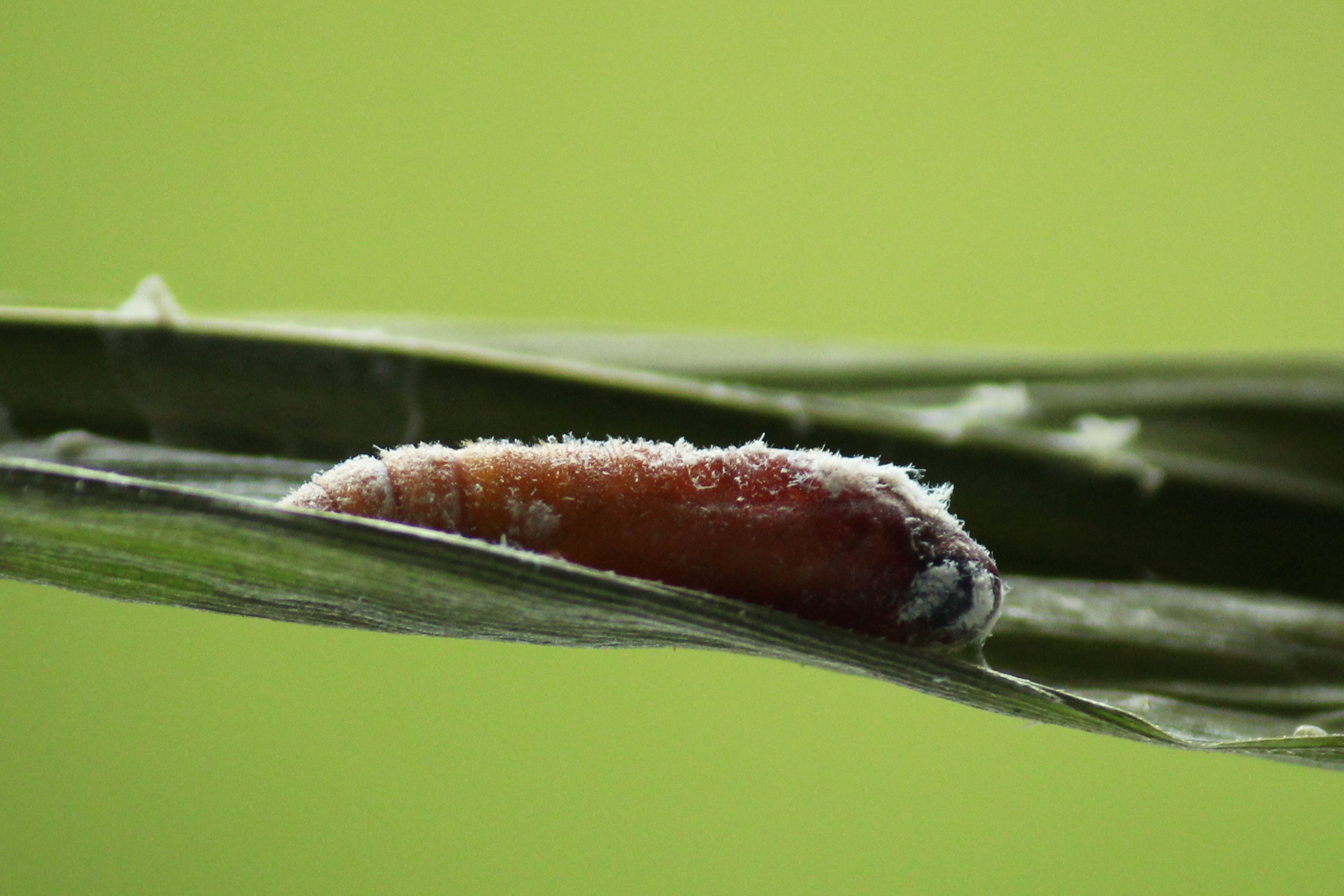
Pupa

===== Telicota colon (pale palm dart) =====
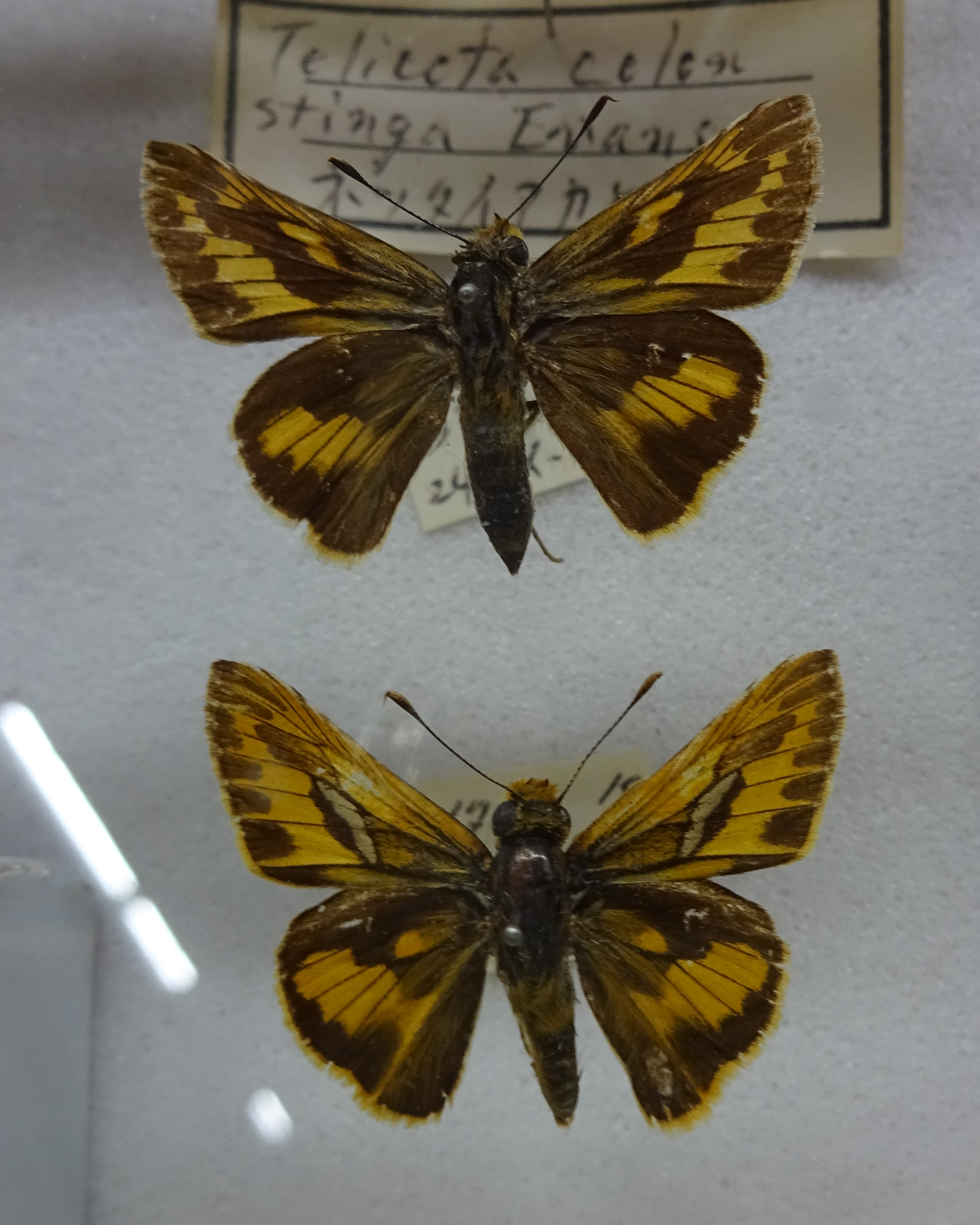
Museum specimen

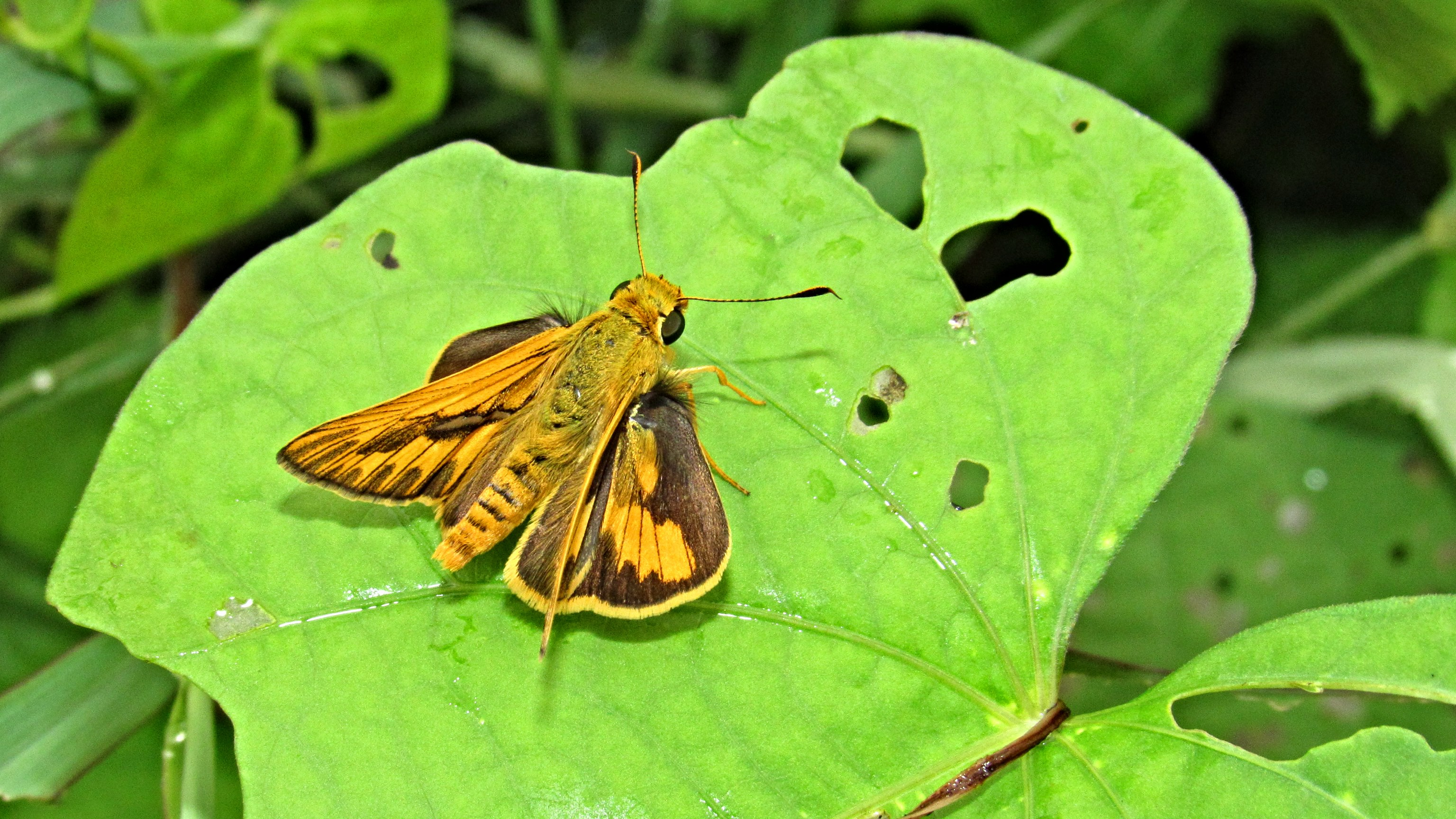
Dorsal view

==== Genus: Thoressa ====
===== Thoressa astigmata (southern spotted ace) =====
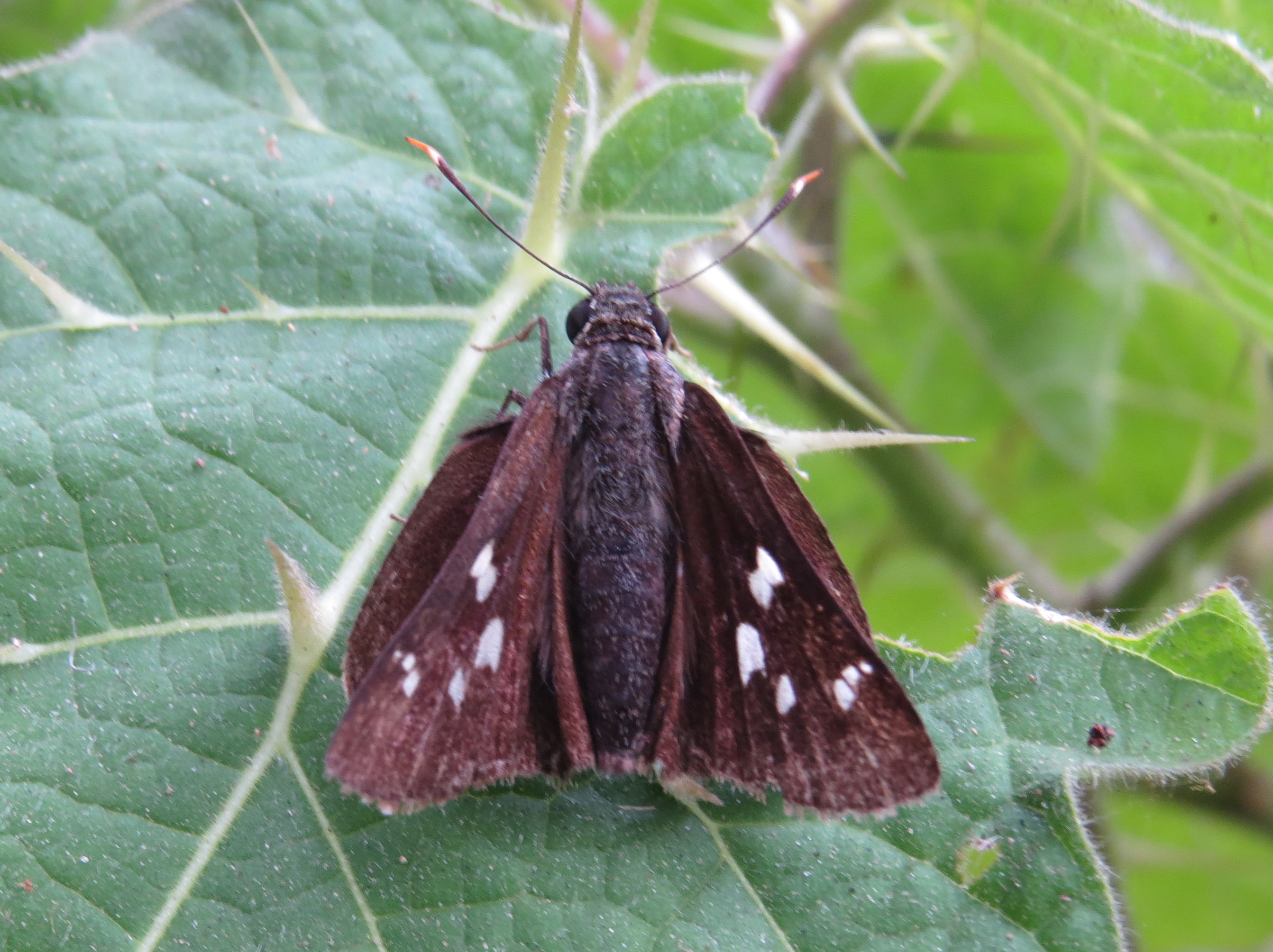
Dorsal view

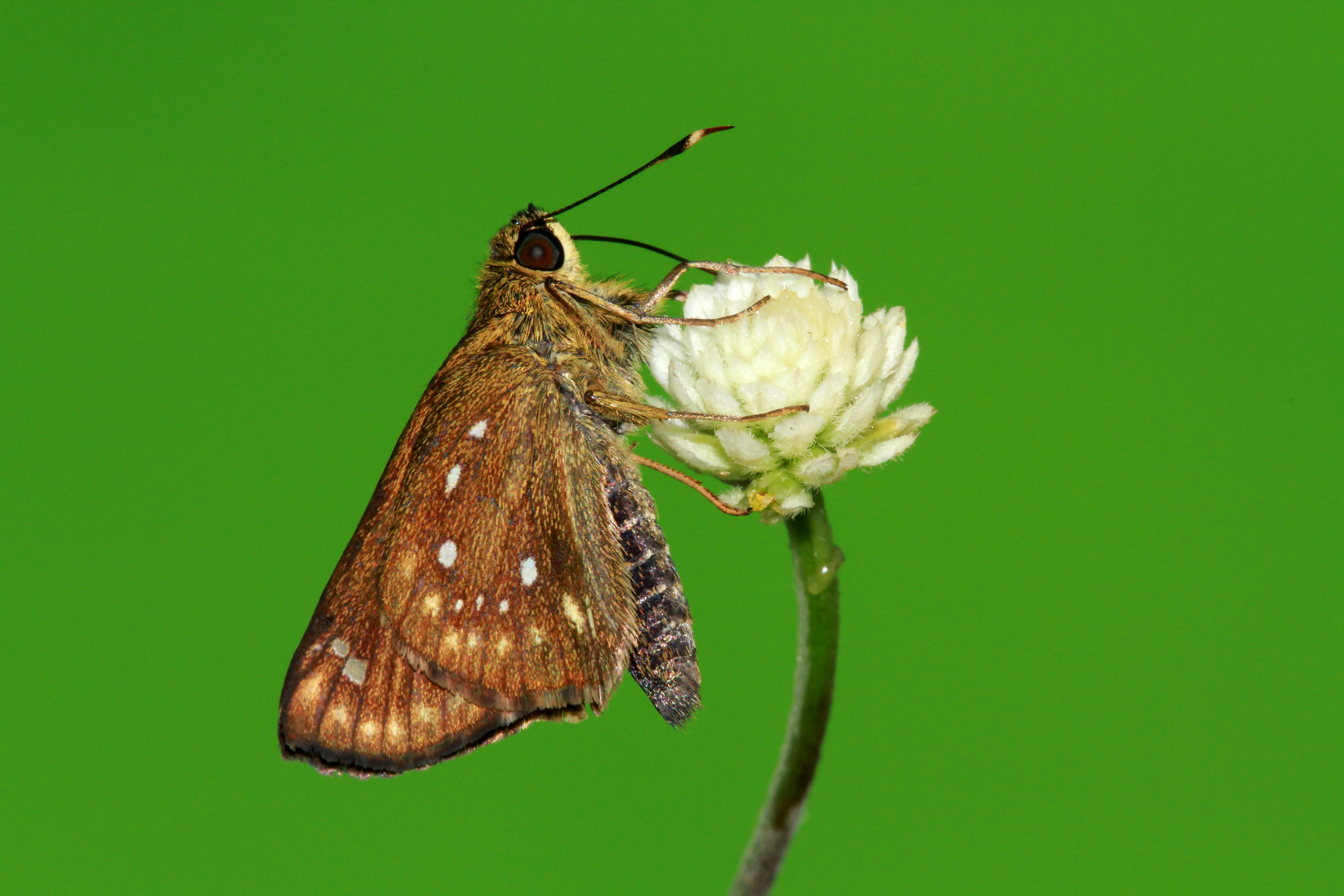
Ventral view

===== Thoressa evershedi (Evershed's ace) =====
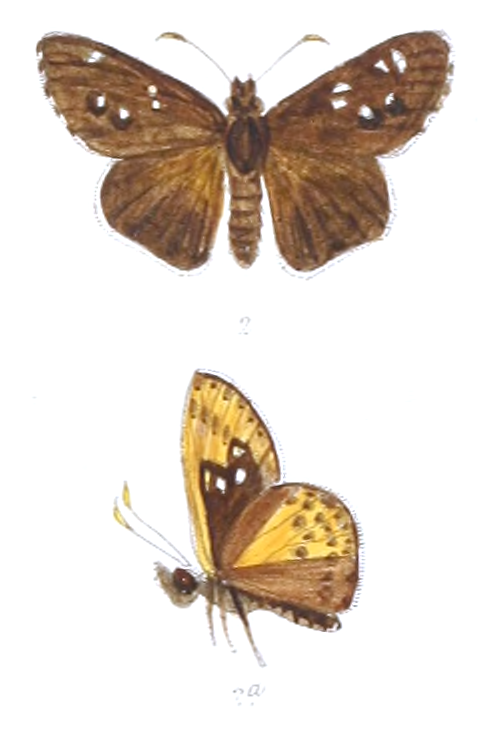
Illustration

===== Thoressa honorei (Madras ace) =====
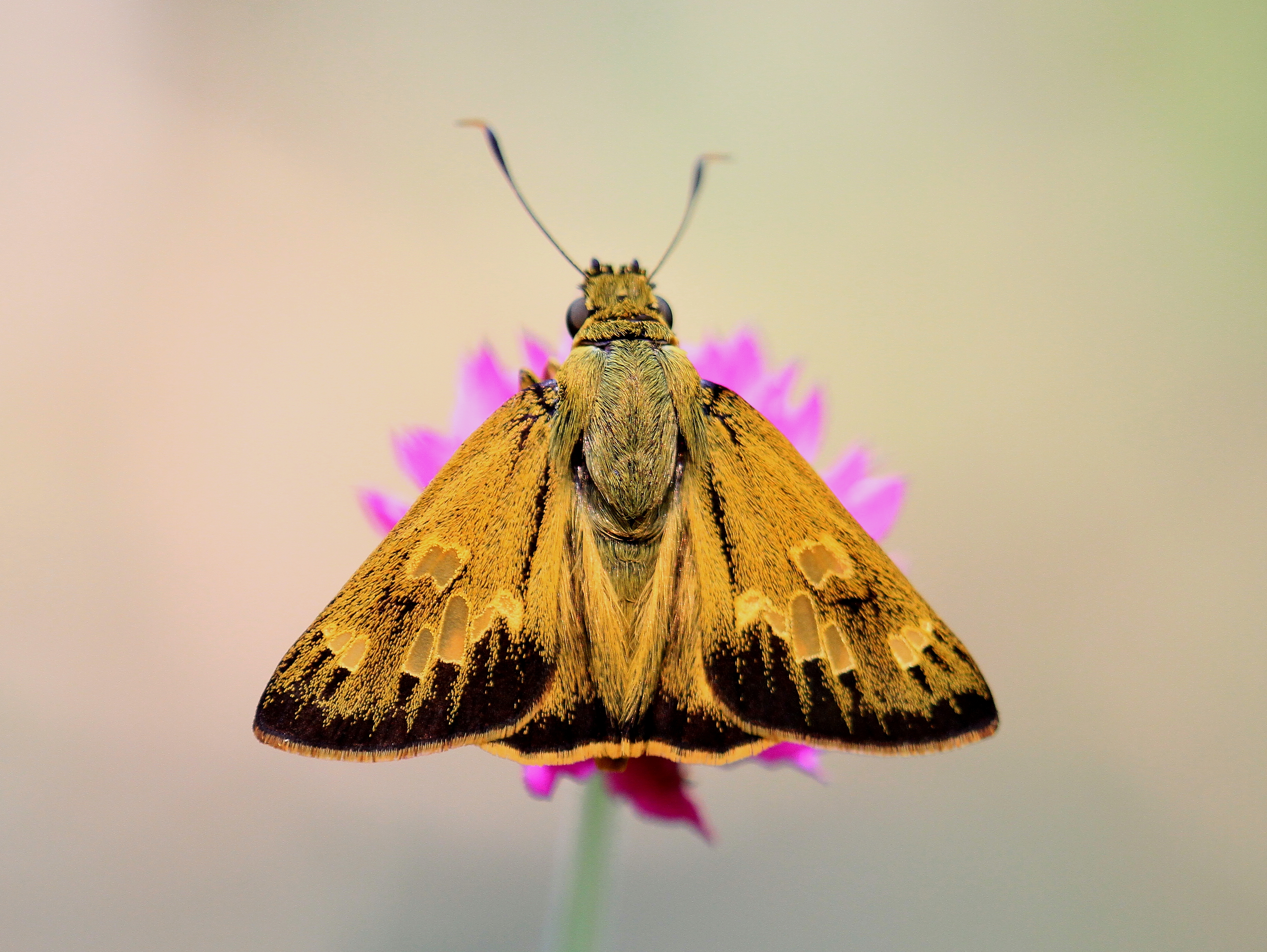
Dorsal view

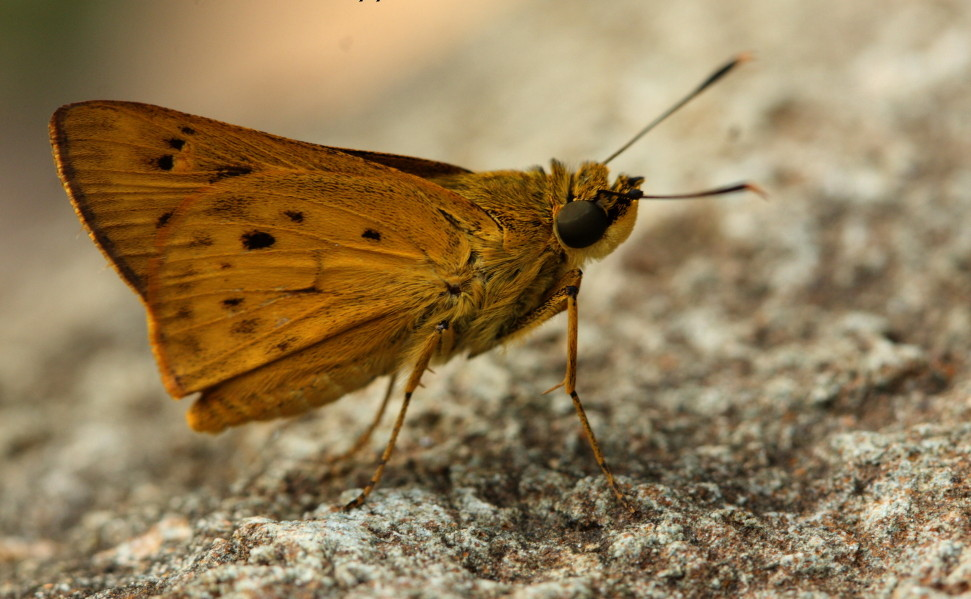
Lateral view

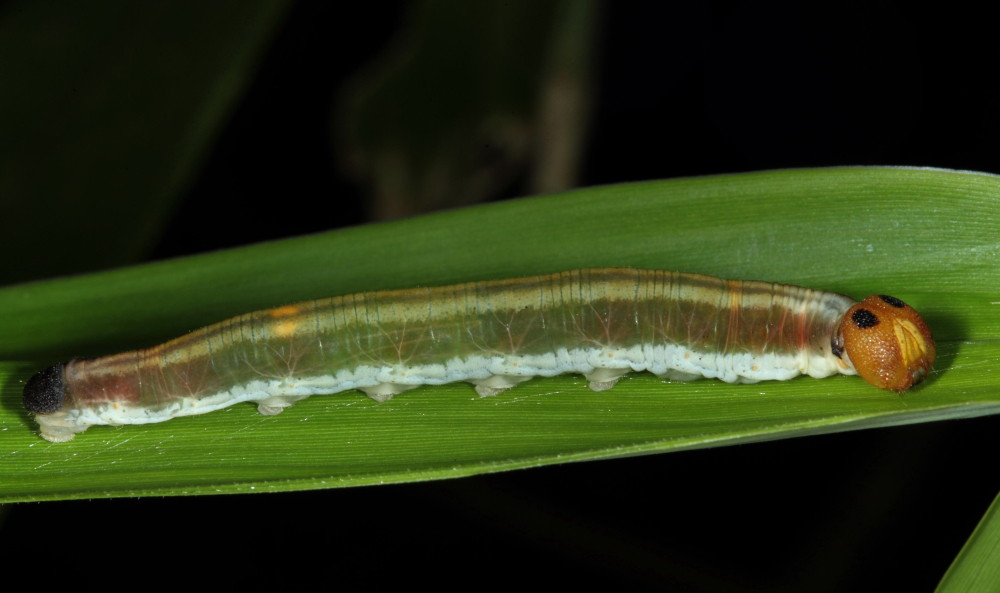
Larva

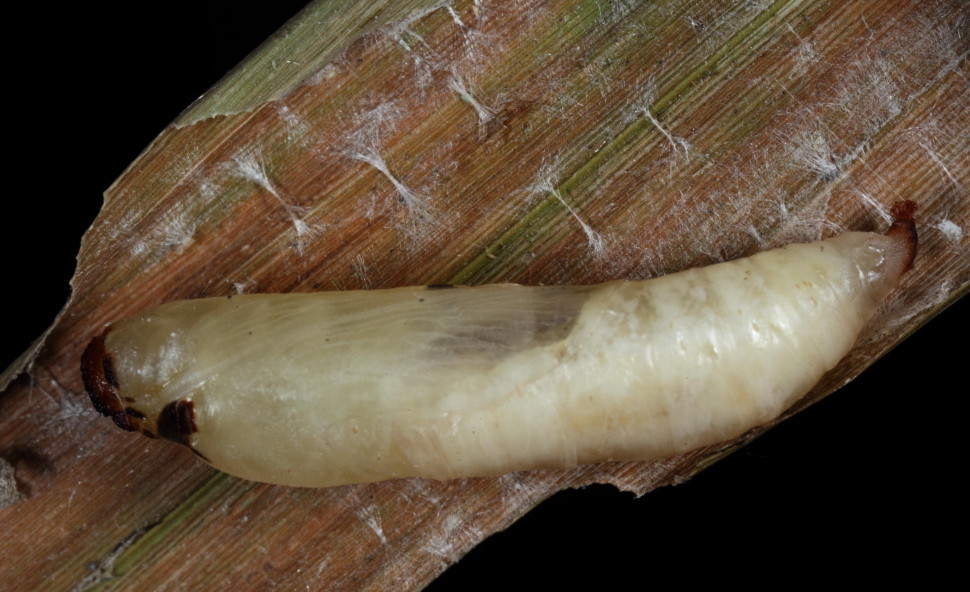
Chrysalis

===== Thoressa sitala (Tamil ace) =====
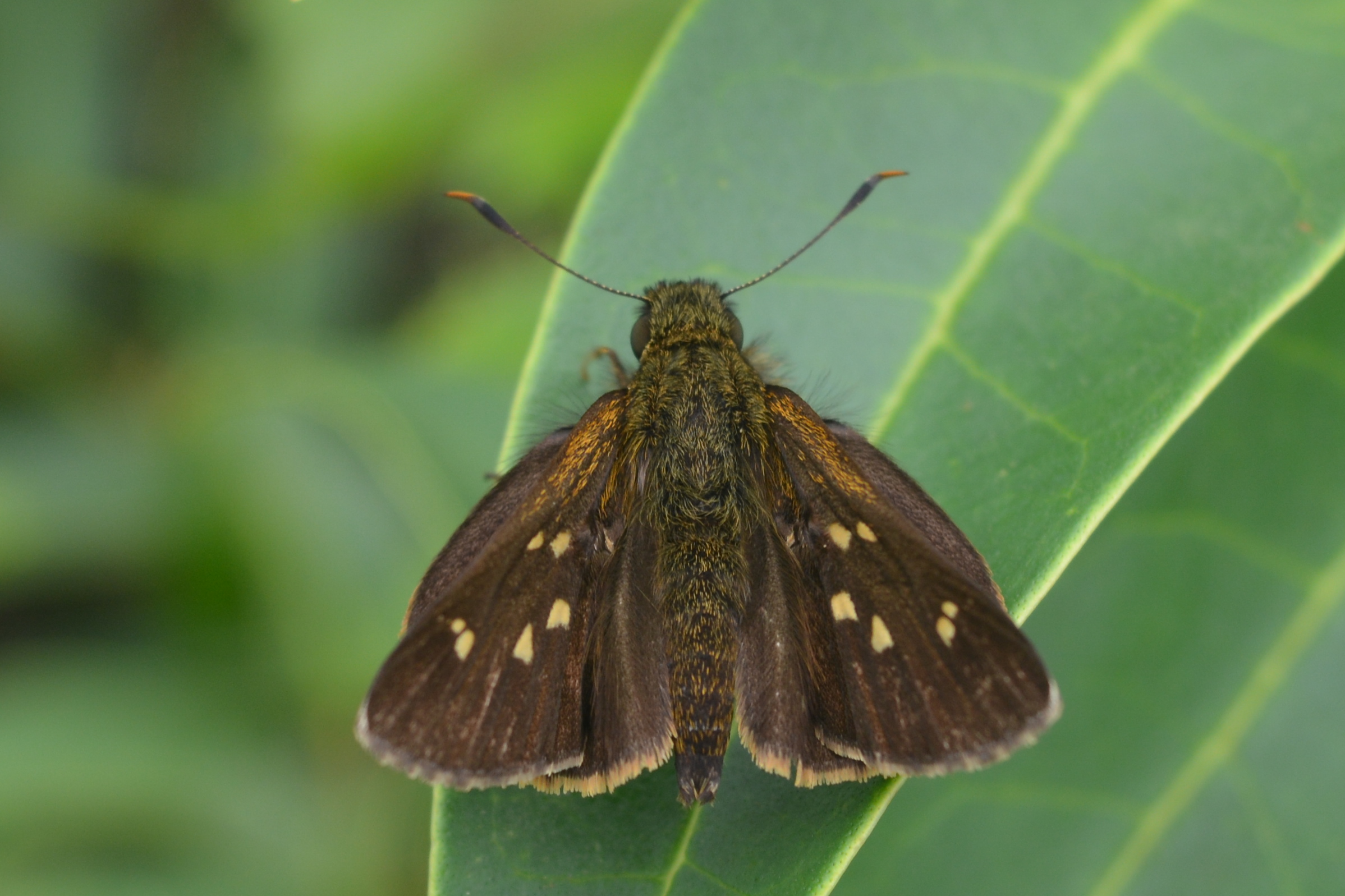
Dorsal view

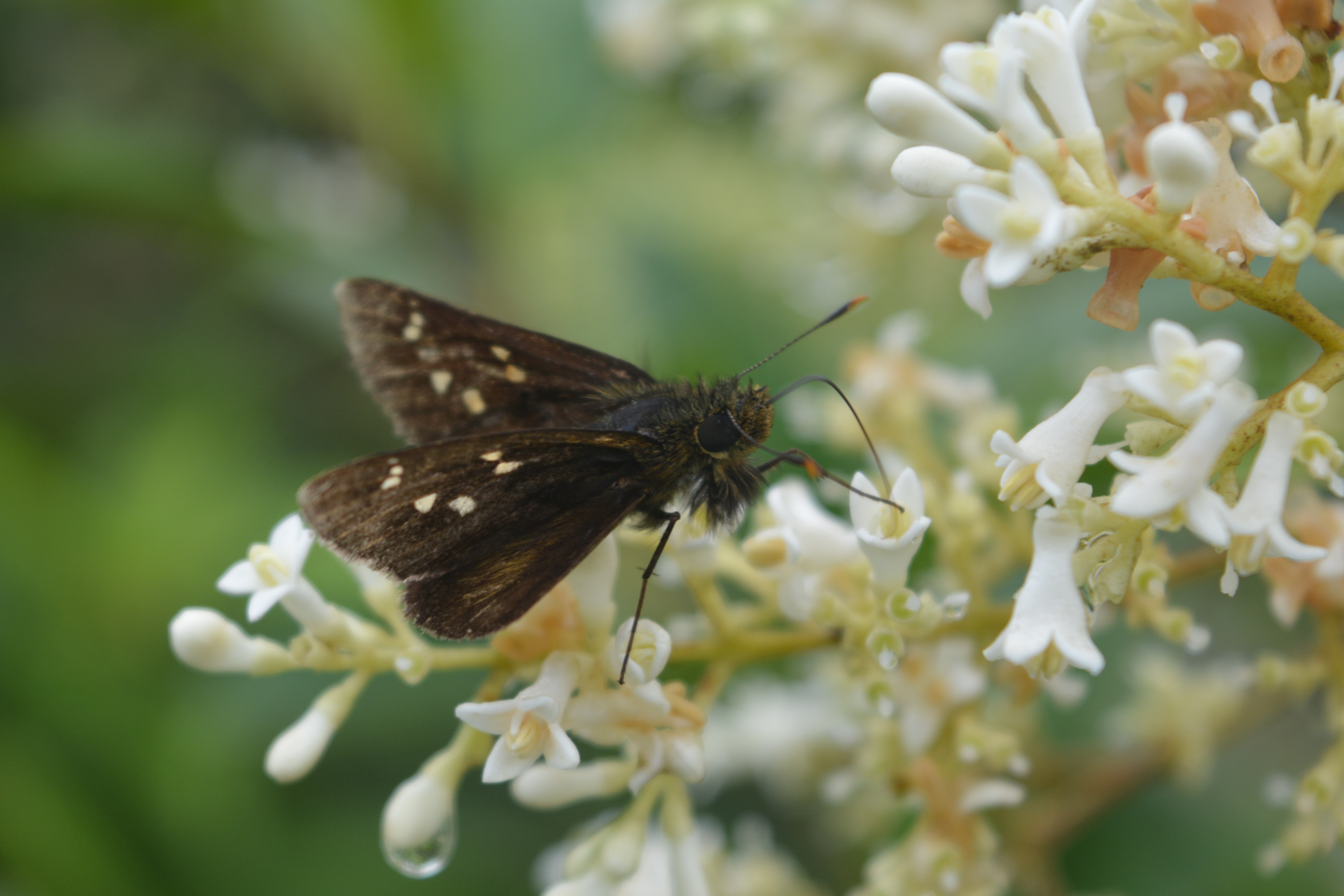
Ventral view

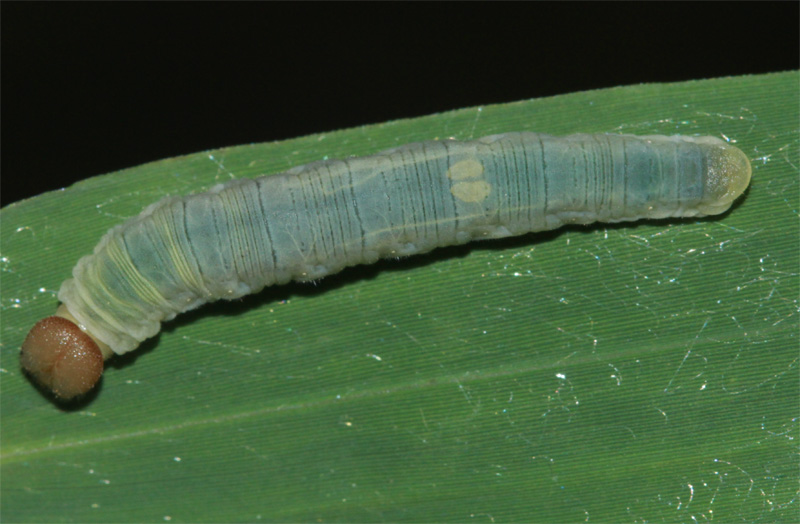
Larva

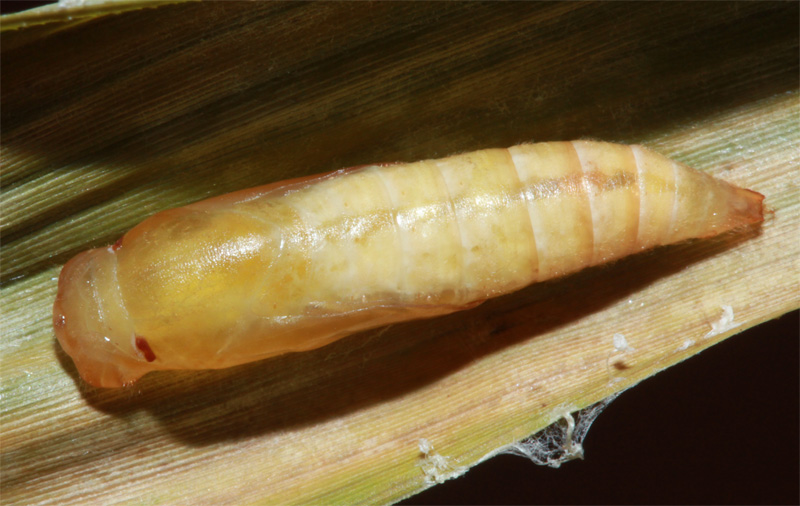
Pupa

==== Genus: Udaspes ====
===== Udaspes folus (grass demon) =====
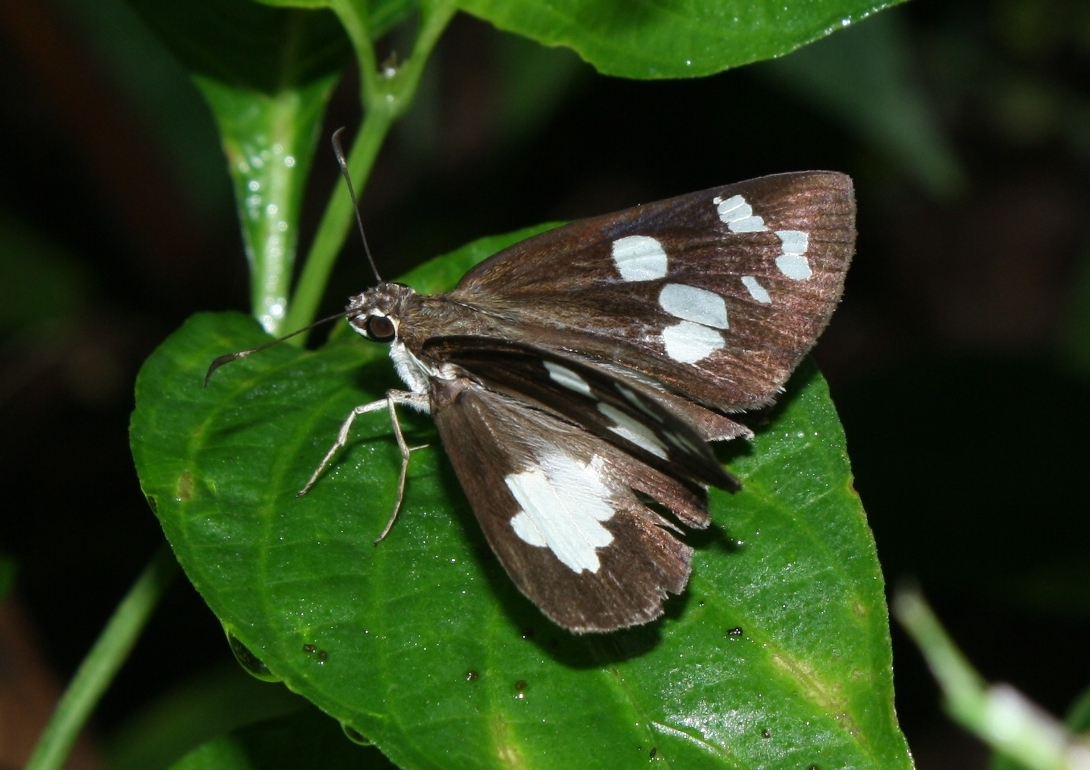
Dorsal view

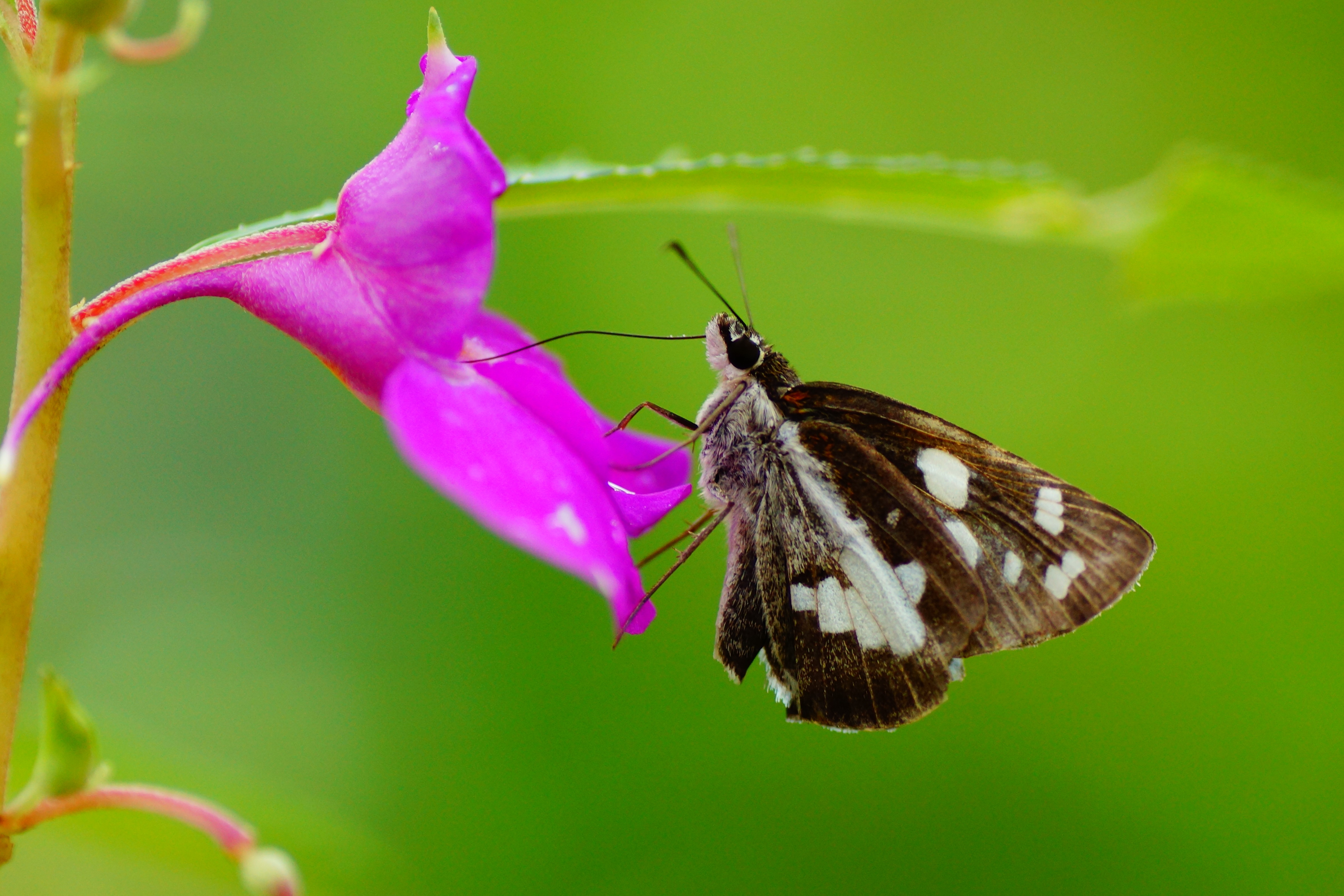
Ventral view

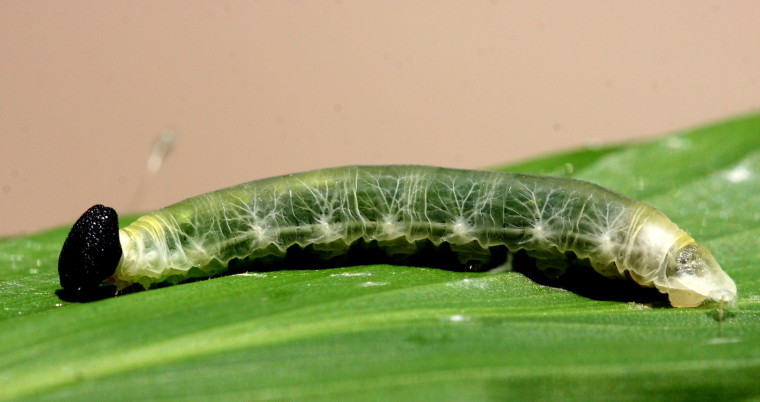
Larva

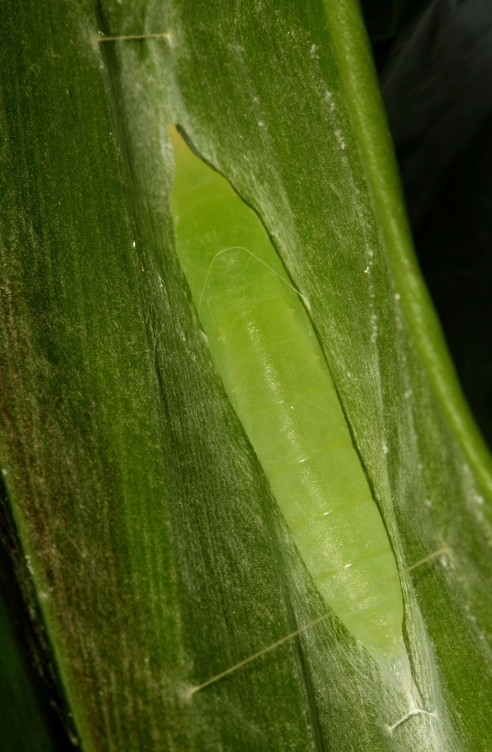
Pupa

==== Genus: Zographetus ====
===== Zographetus ogygia (purple-spotted flitter) =====
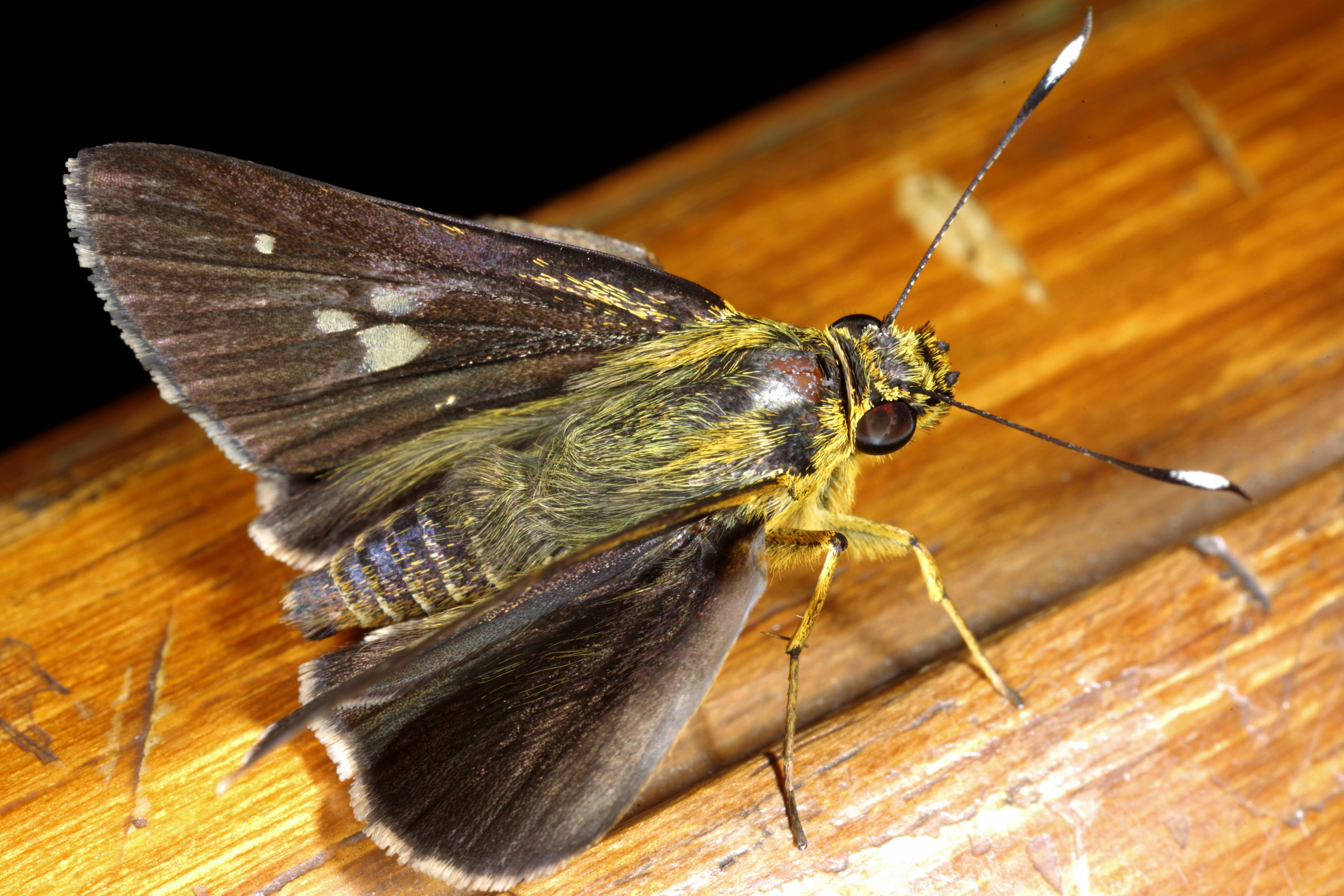
Dorsal view

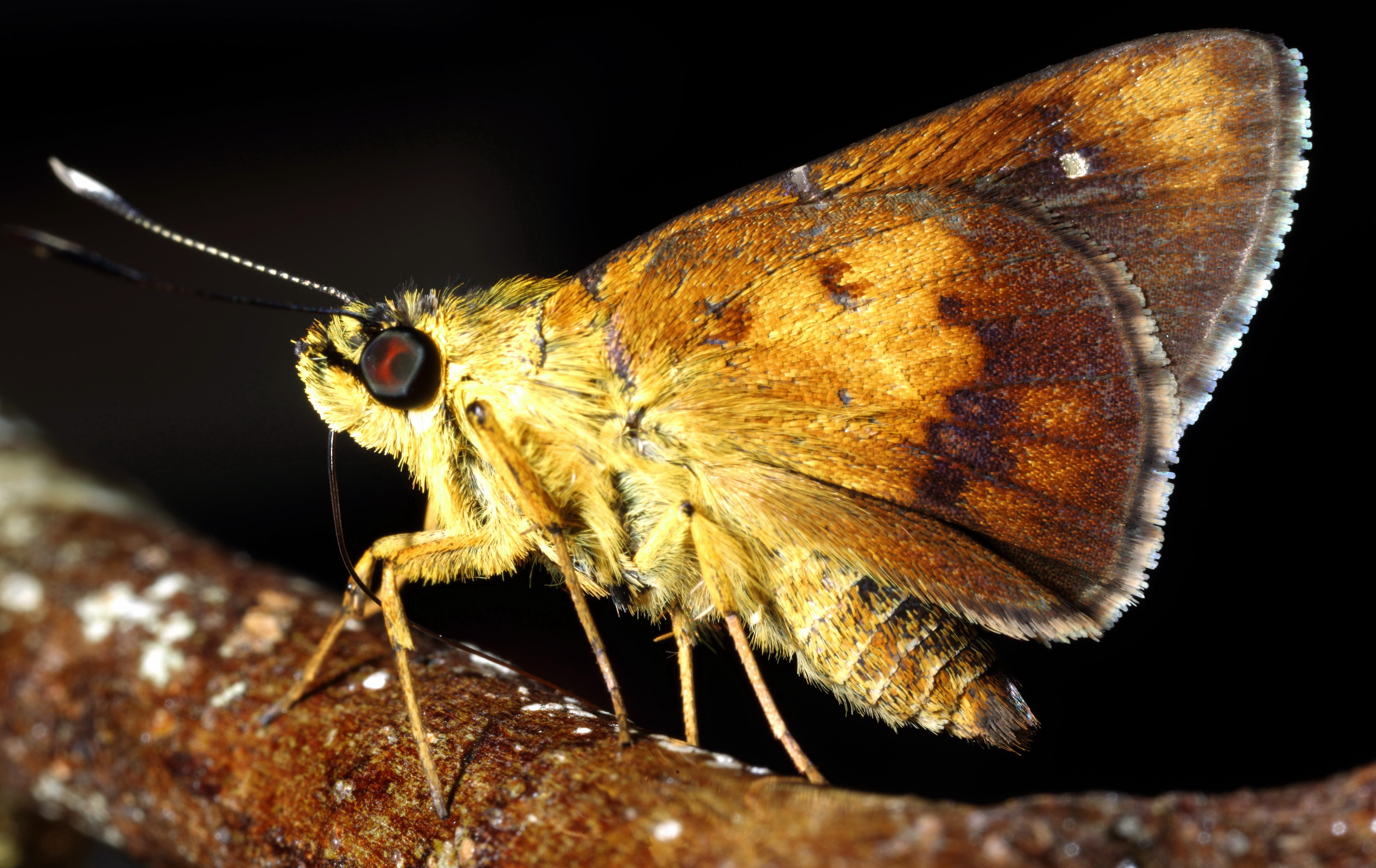
Ventral view

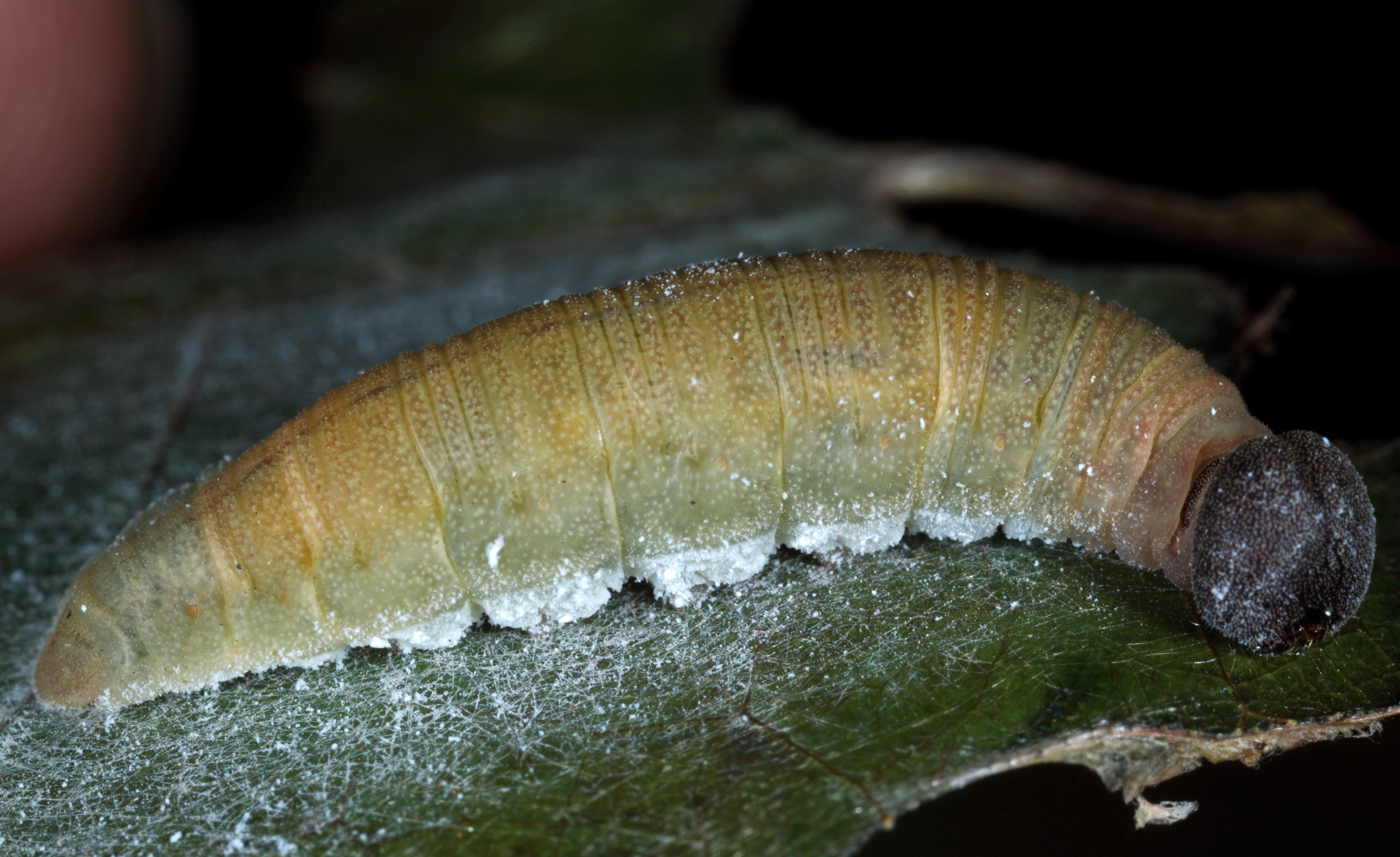
Larva

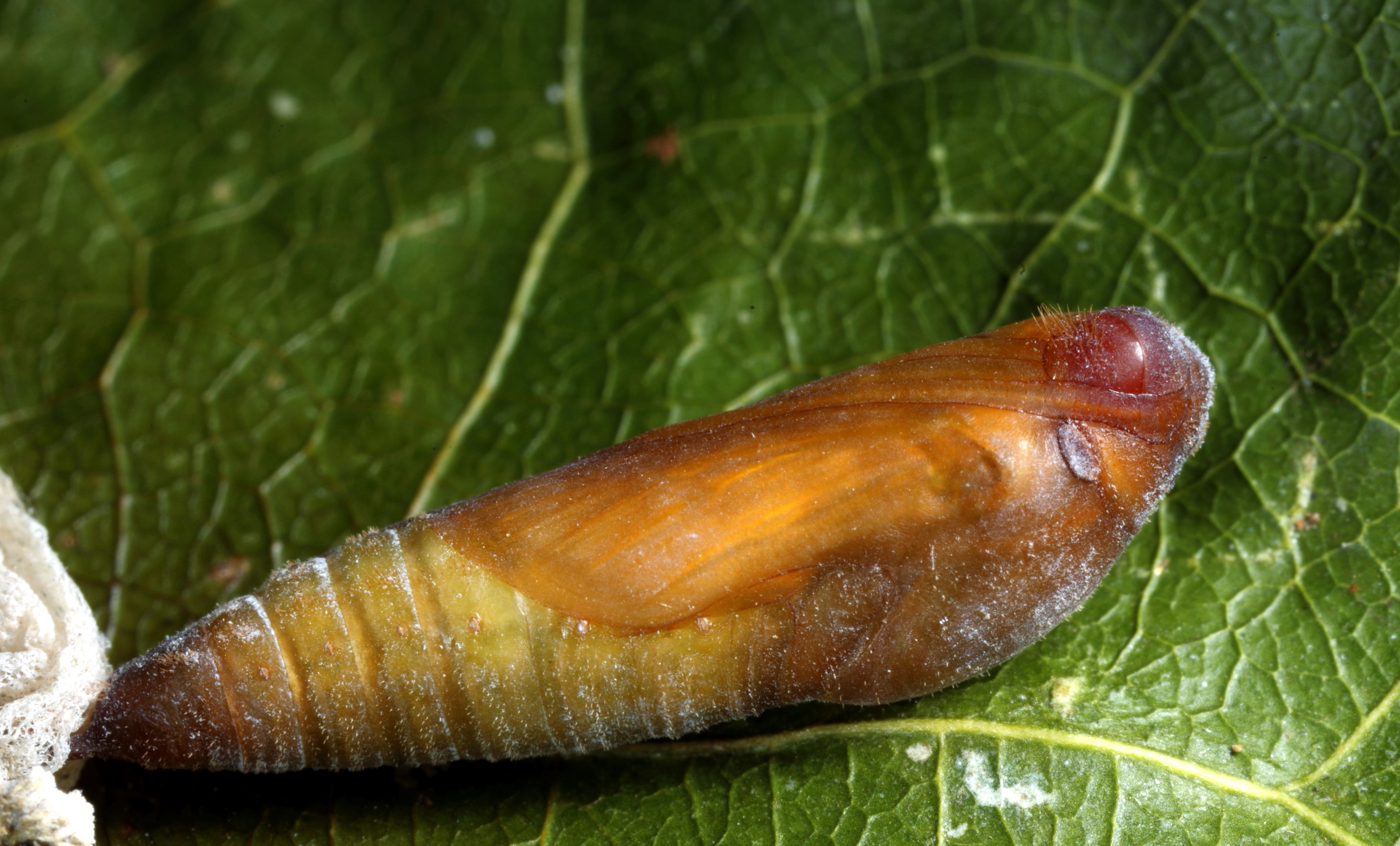
Pupa

=== Subfamily: Pyrginae ===
==== Genus: Caprona ====
===== Caprona agama (spotted angle) =====
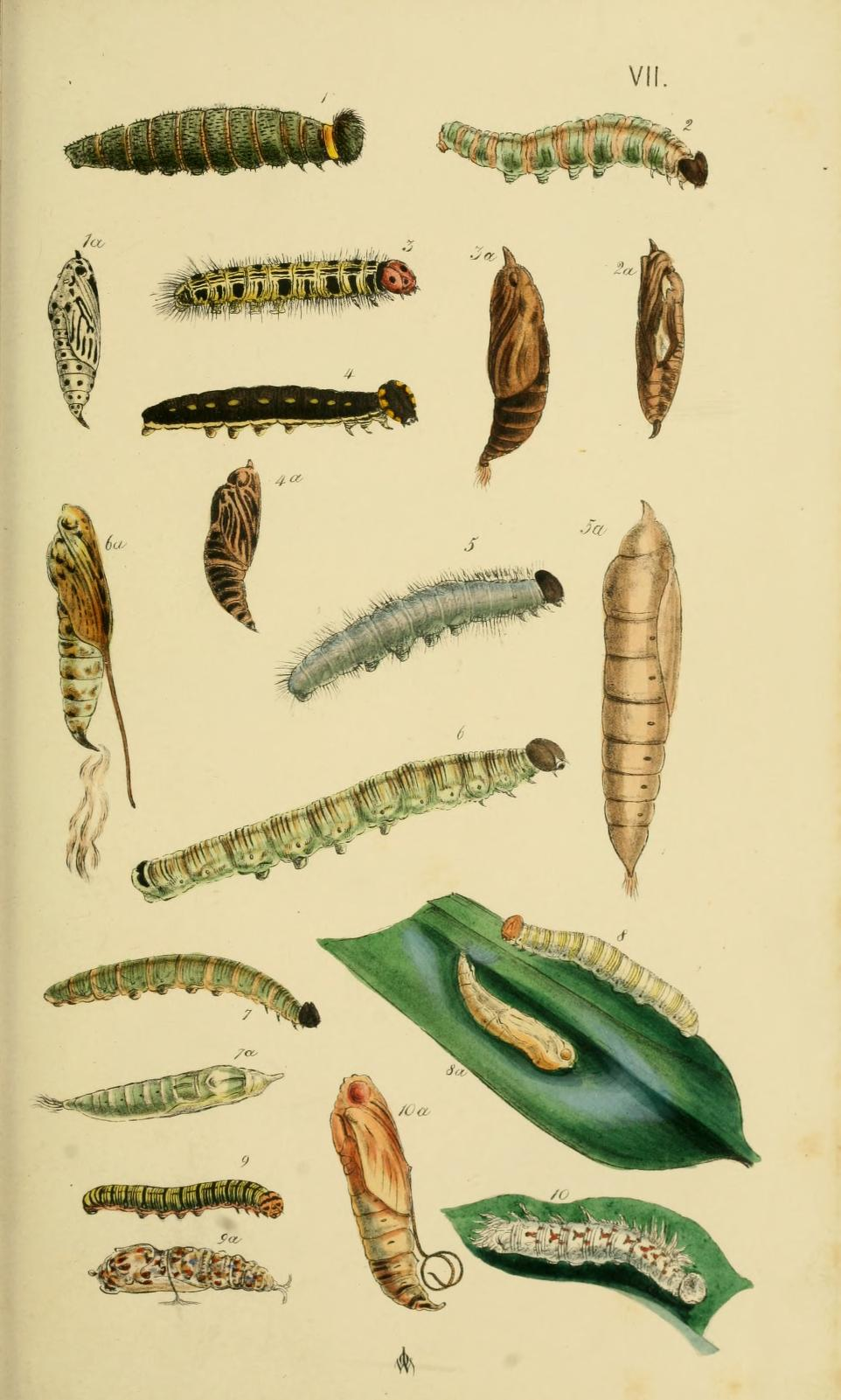
Illustration

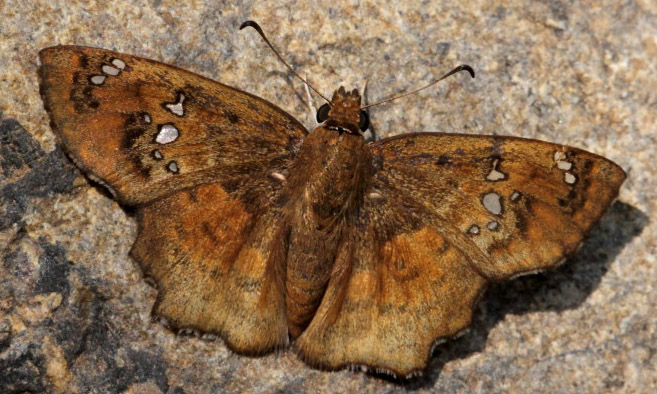
Dorsal view (DSF)

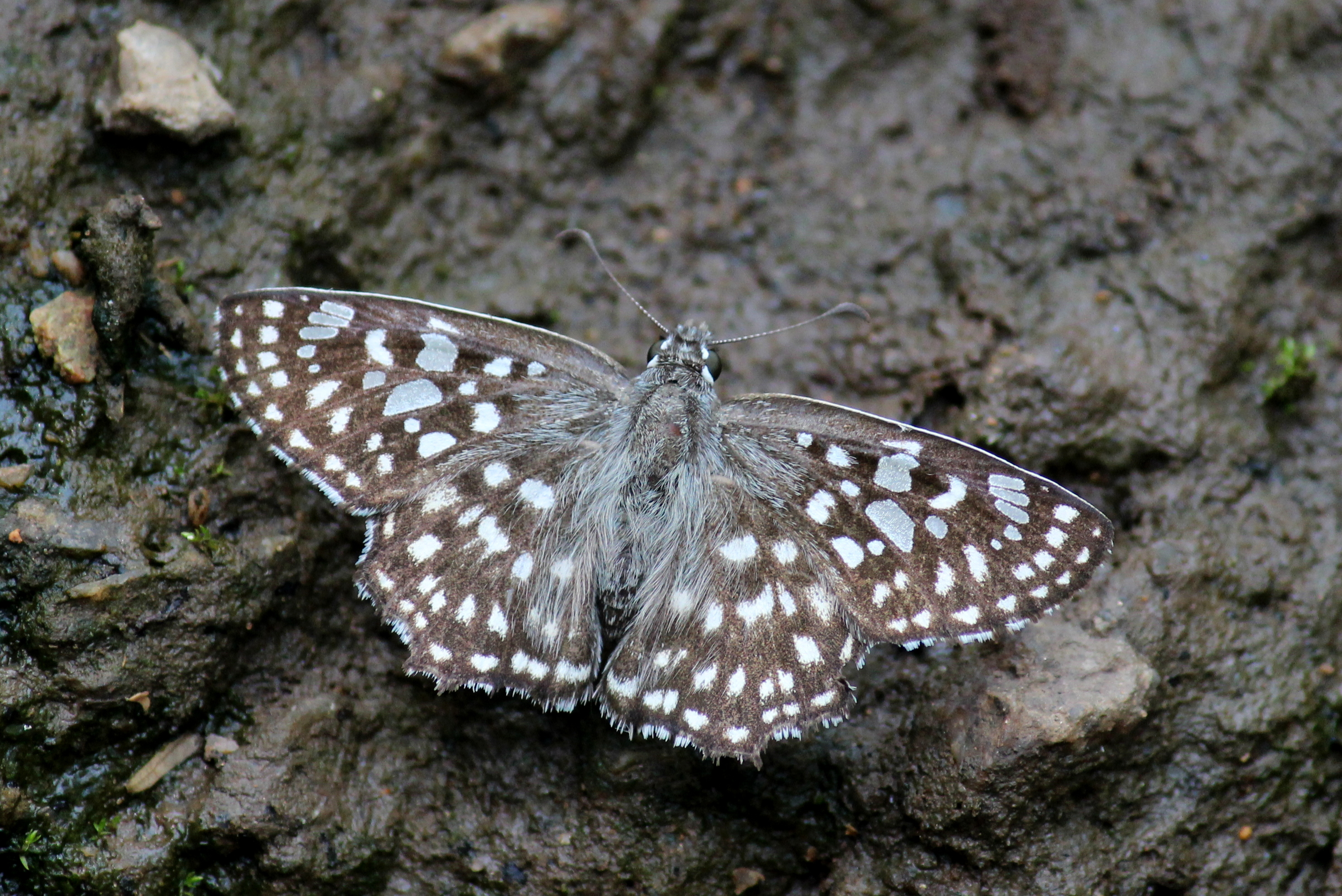
Dorsal view (WSF)

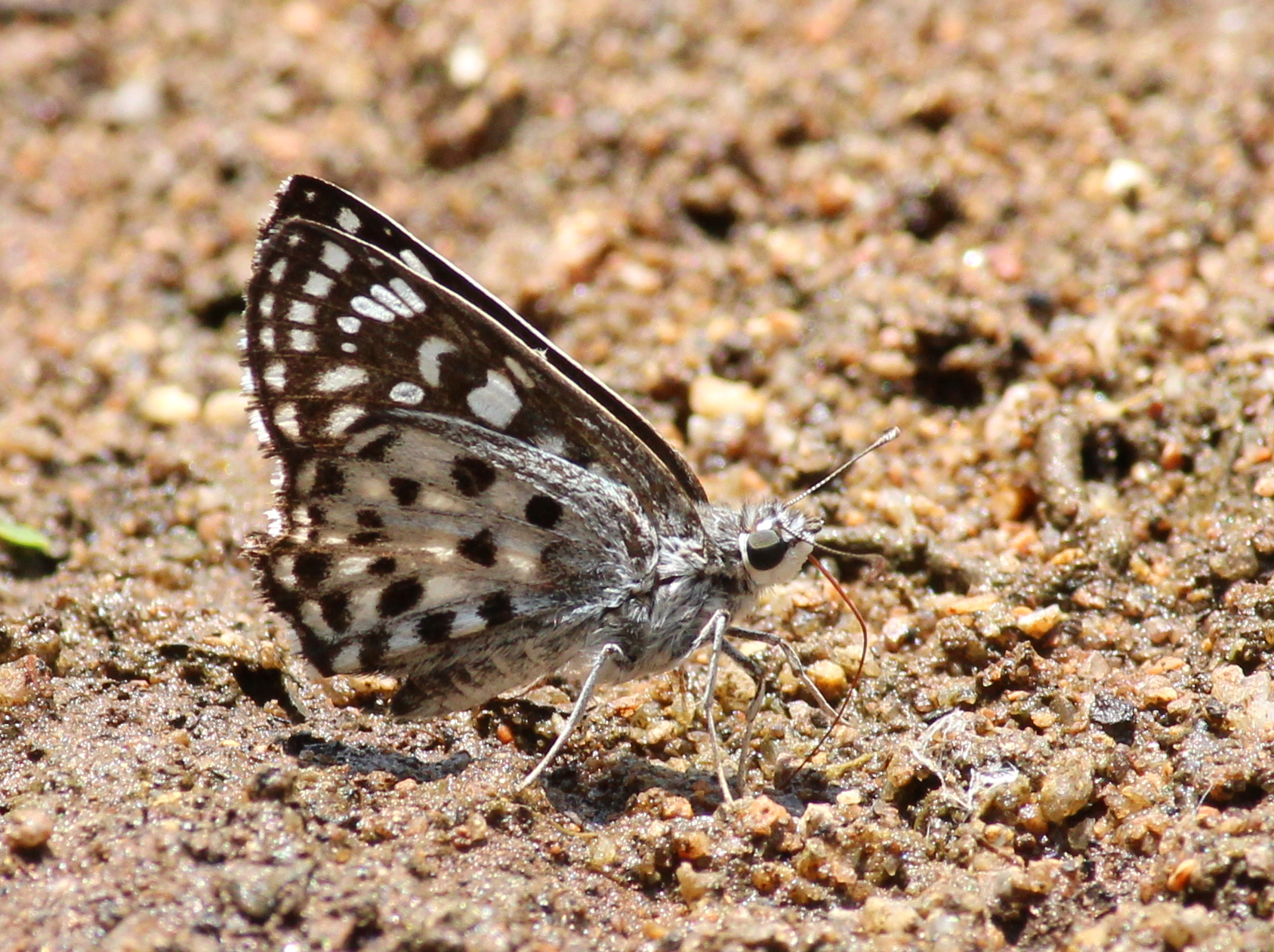
Ventral view (WSF)

===== Caprona alida (Alida angle) =====
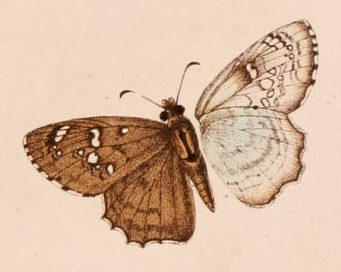
Illustration

===== Caprona ransonnetii (golden angle) =====
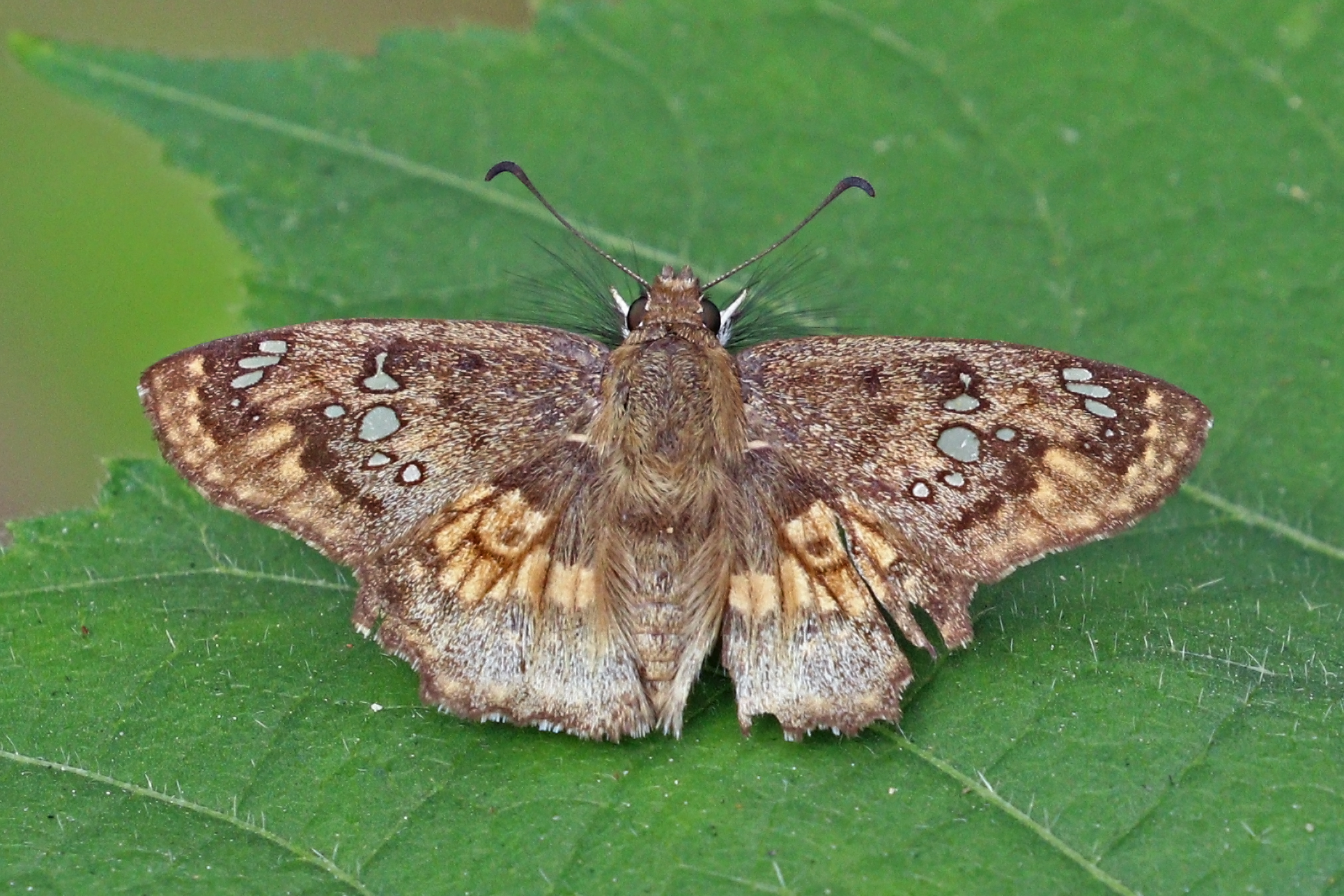
Dorsal view

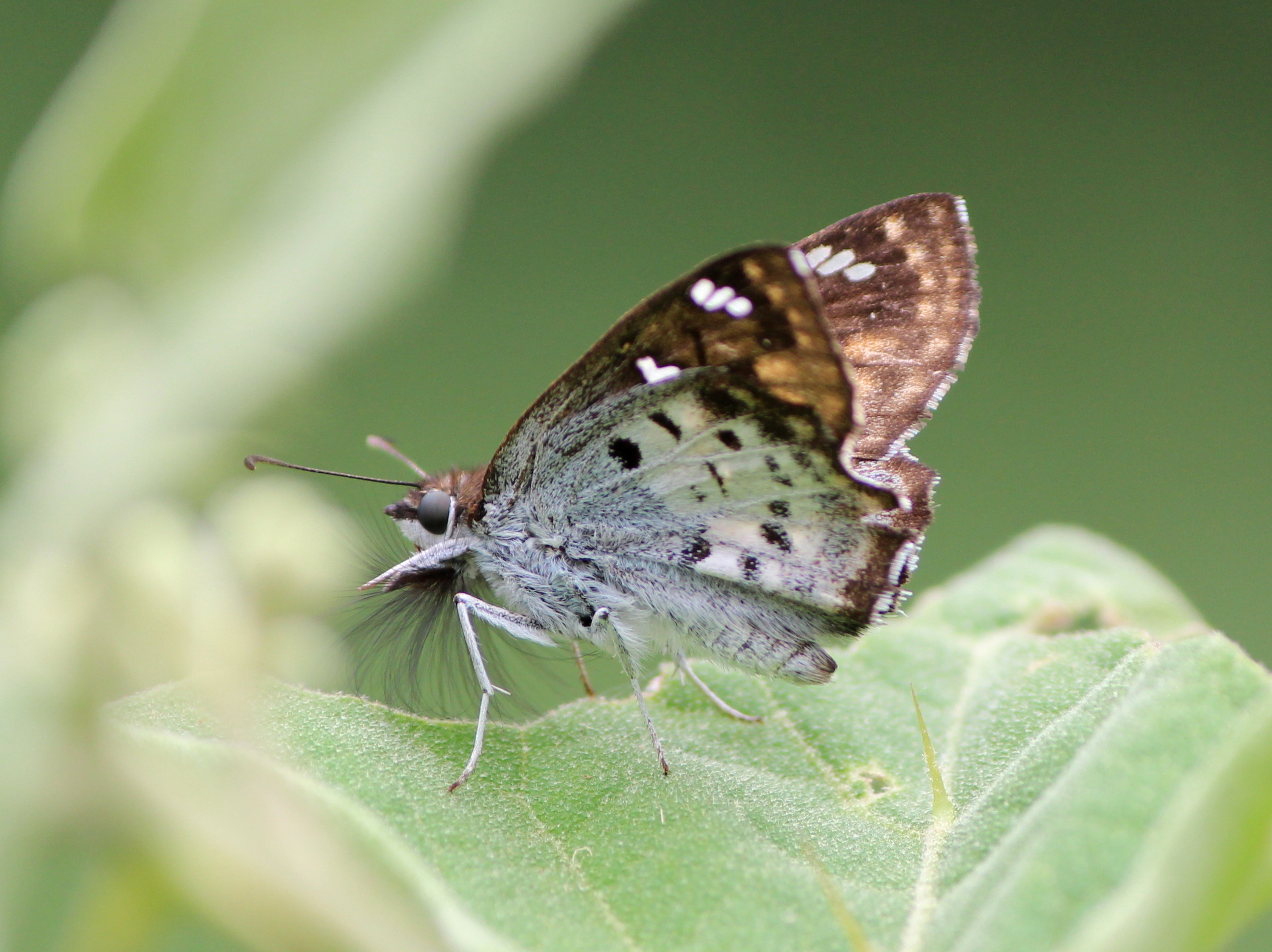
Ventral view

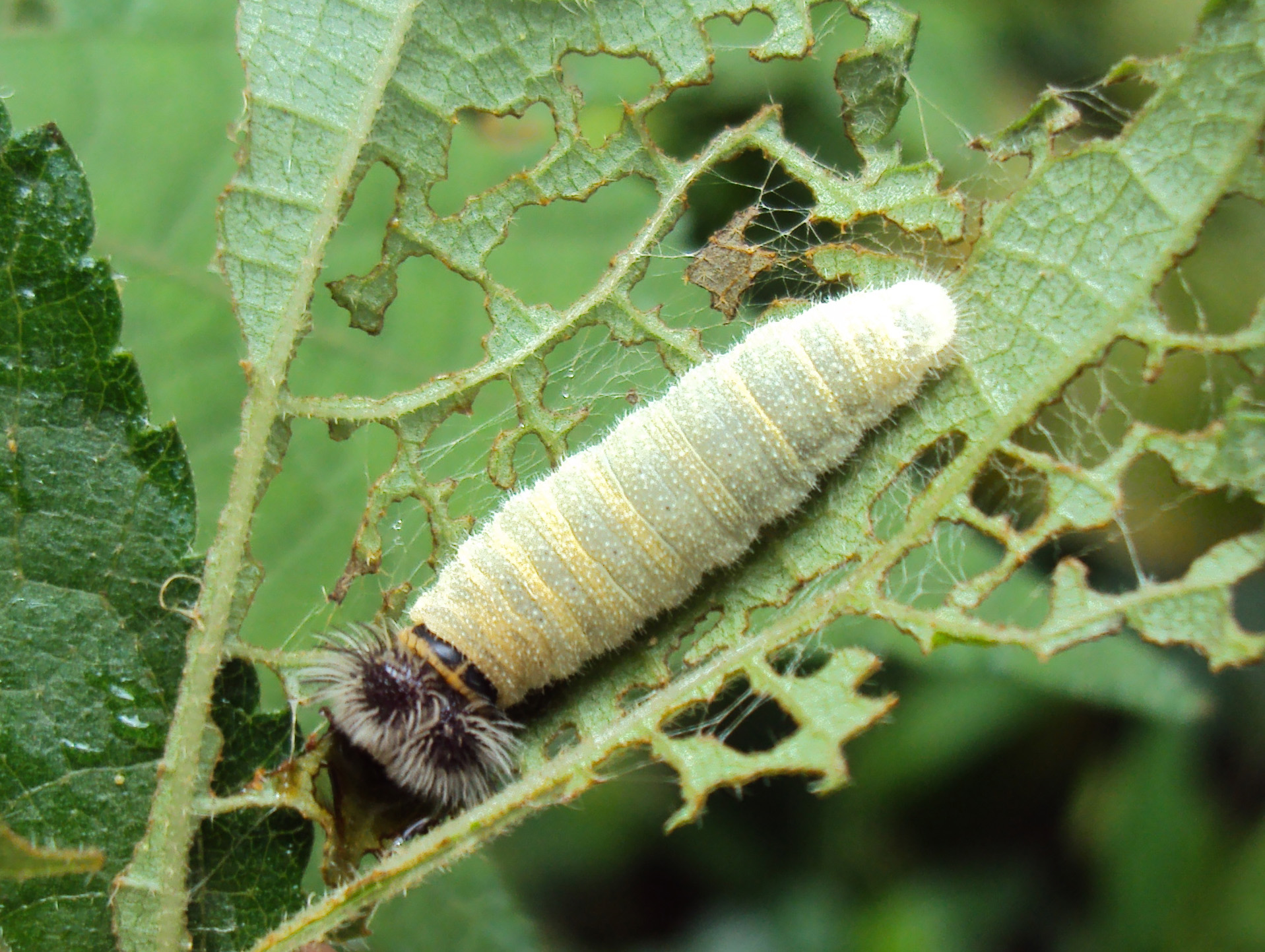
Larva

==== Genus: Celaenorrhinus ====
===== Celaenorrhinus ambareesa (Malabar spotted flat) =====
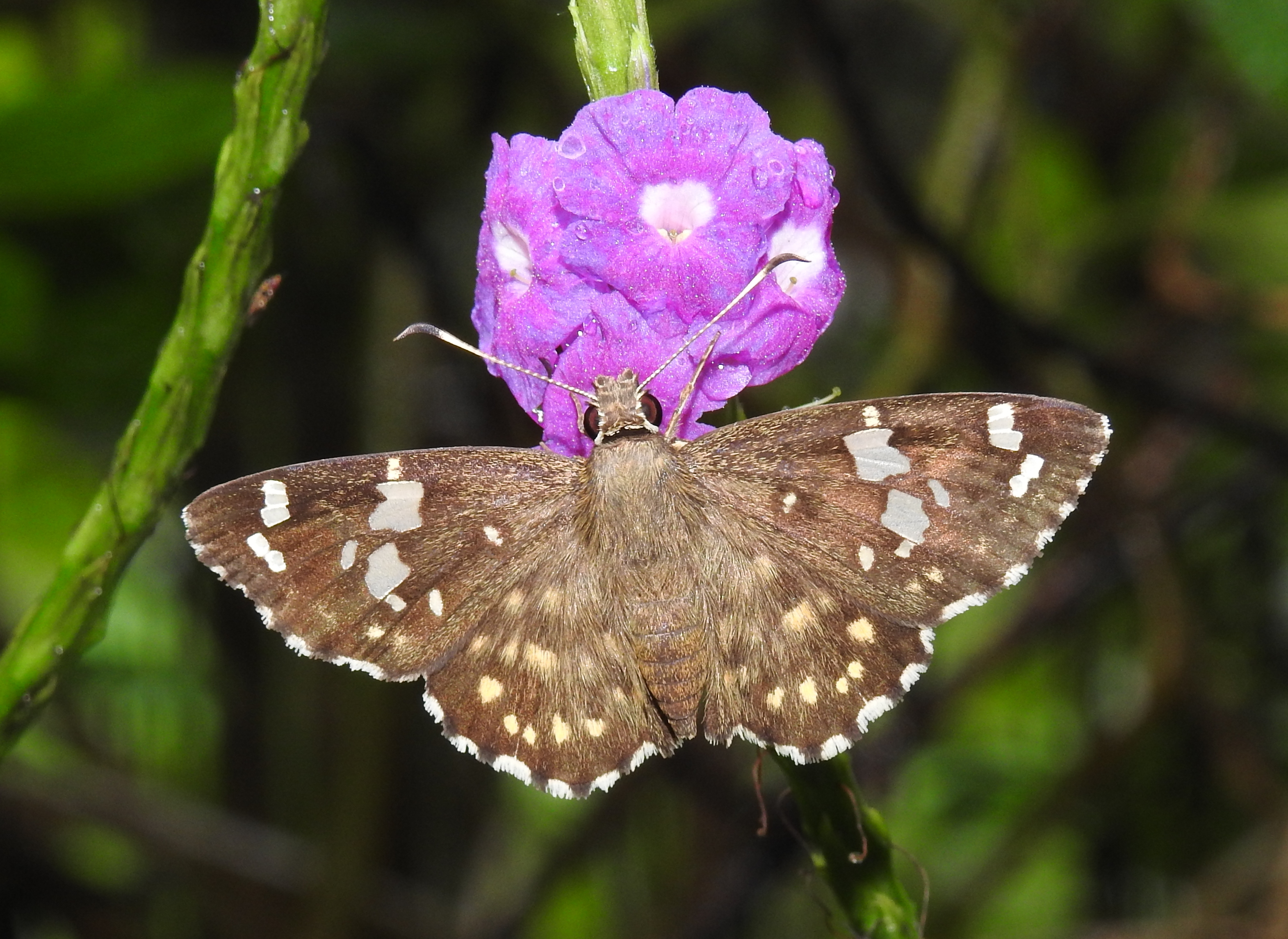
Dorsal view

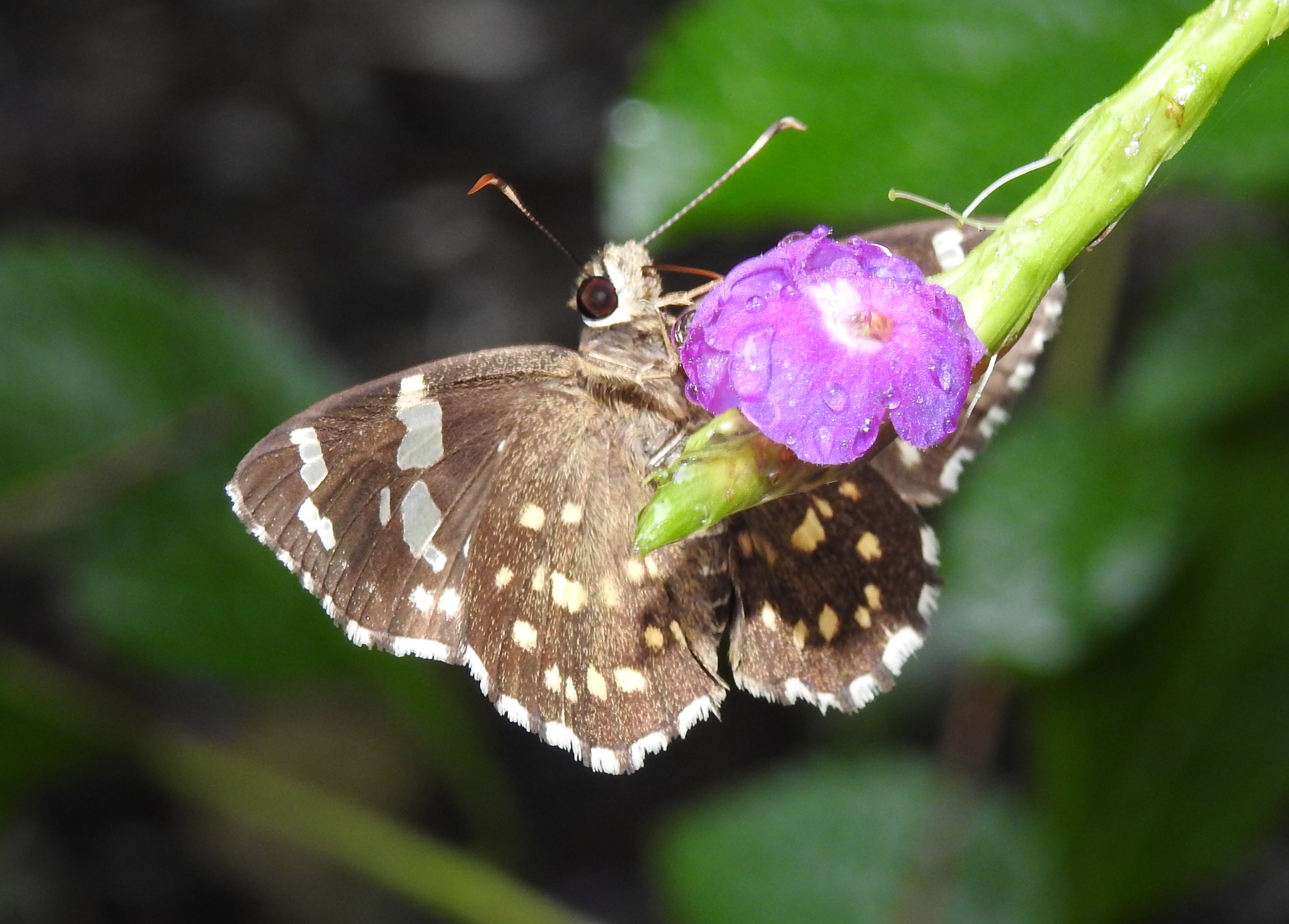
Ventral view

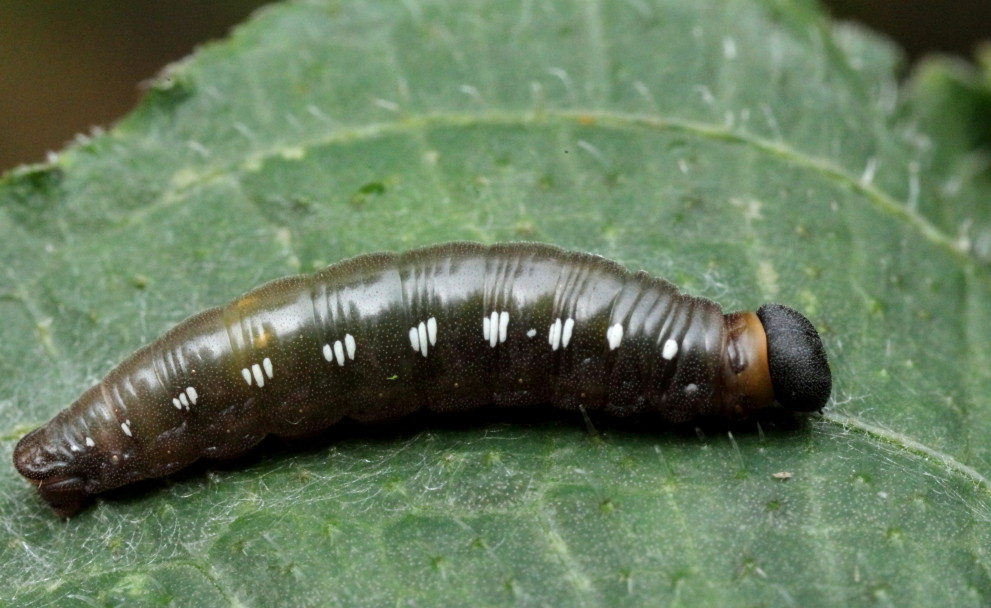
Larva

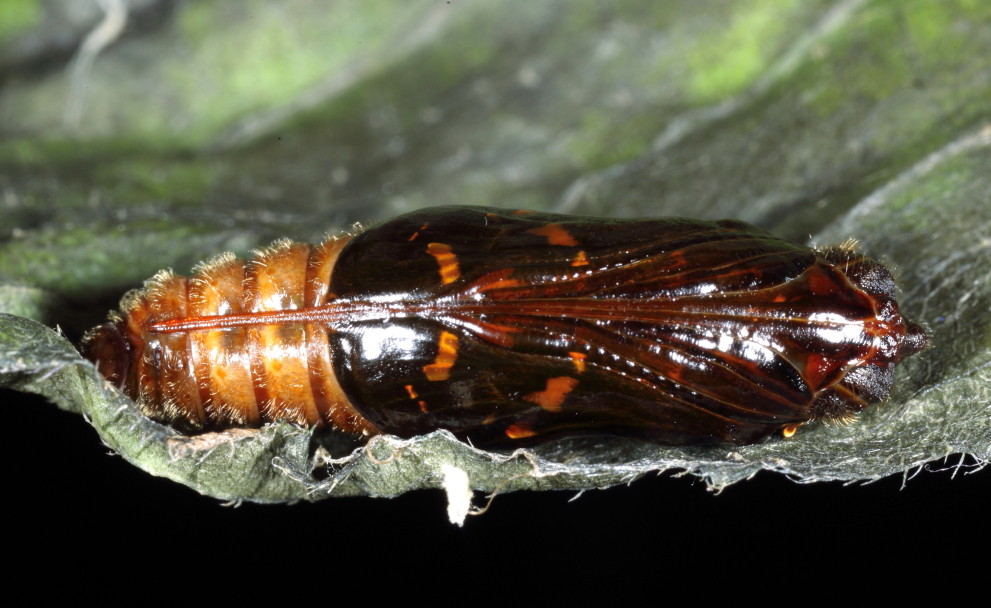
Chrysalis

===== Celaenorrhinus leucocera (common spotted flat) =====
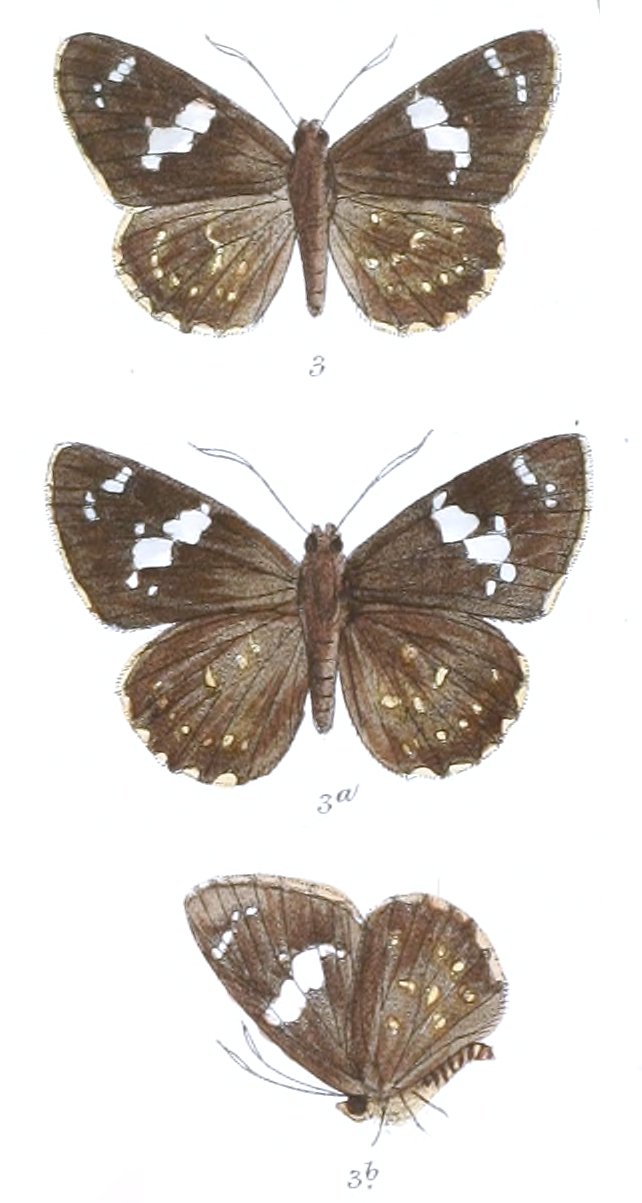
Illustration

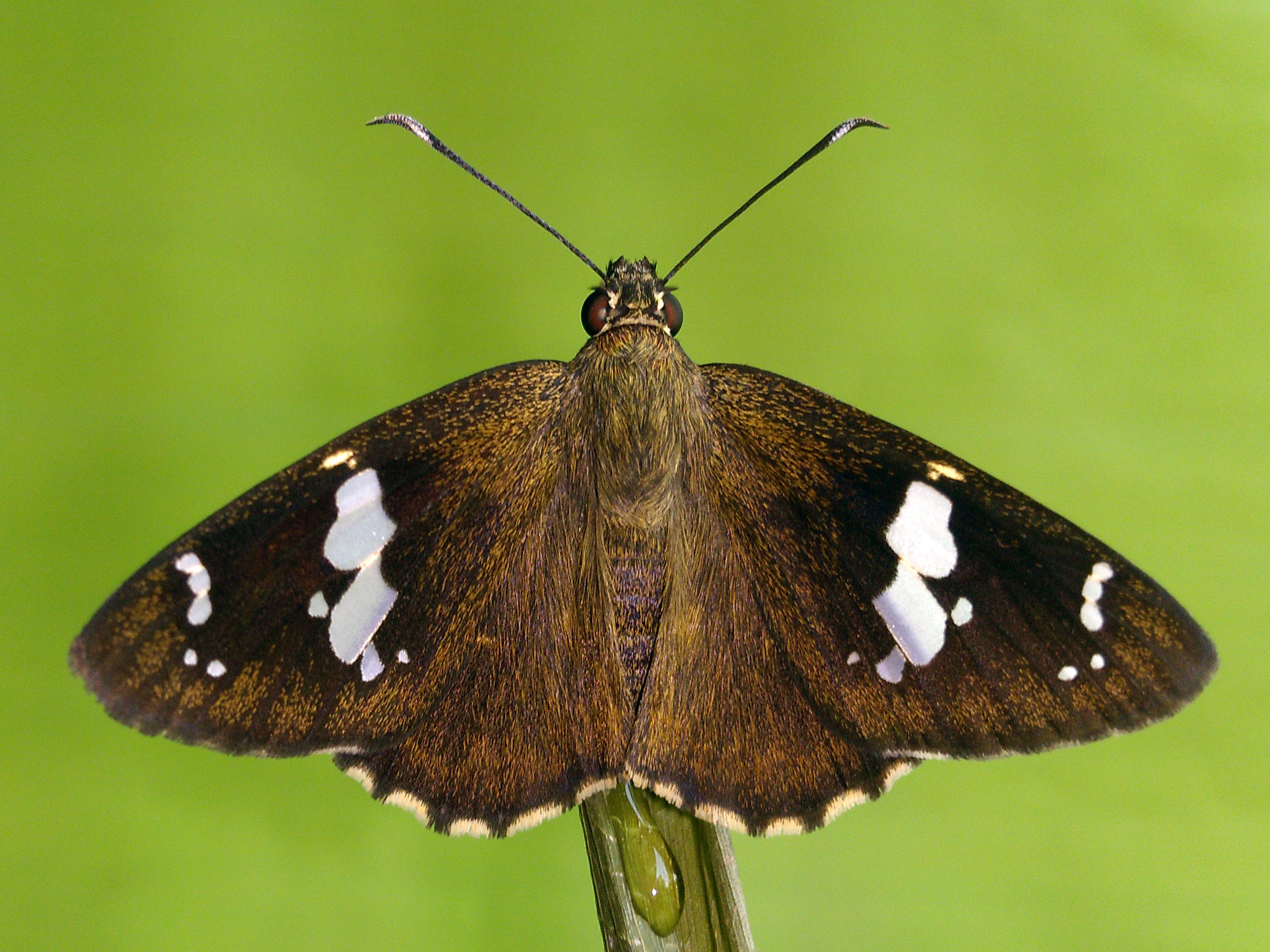
Dorsal view

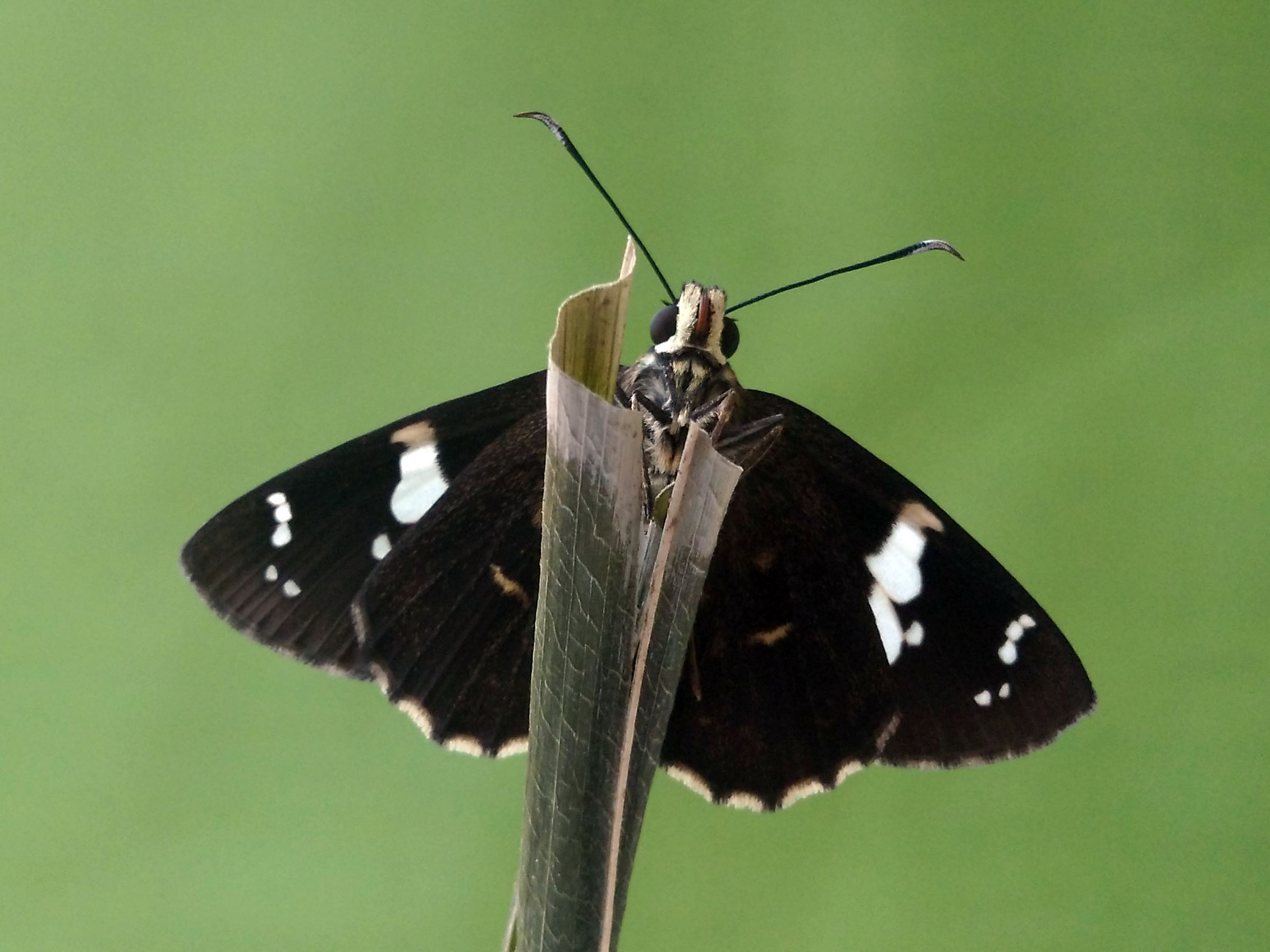
Ventral view

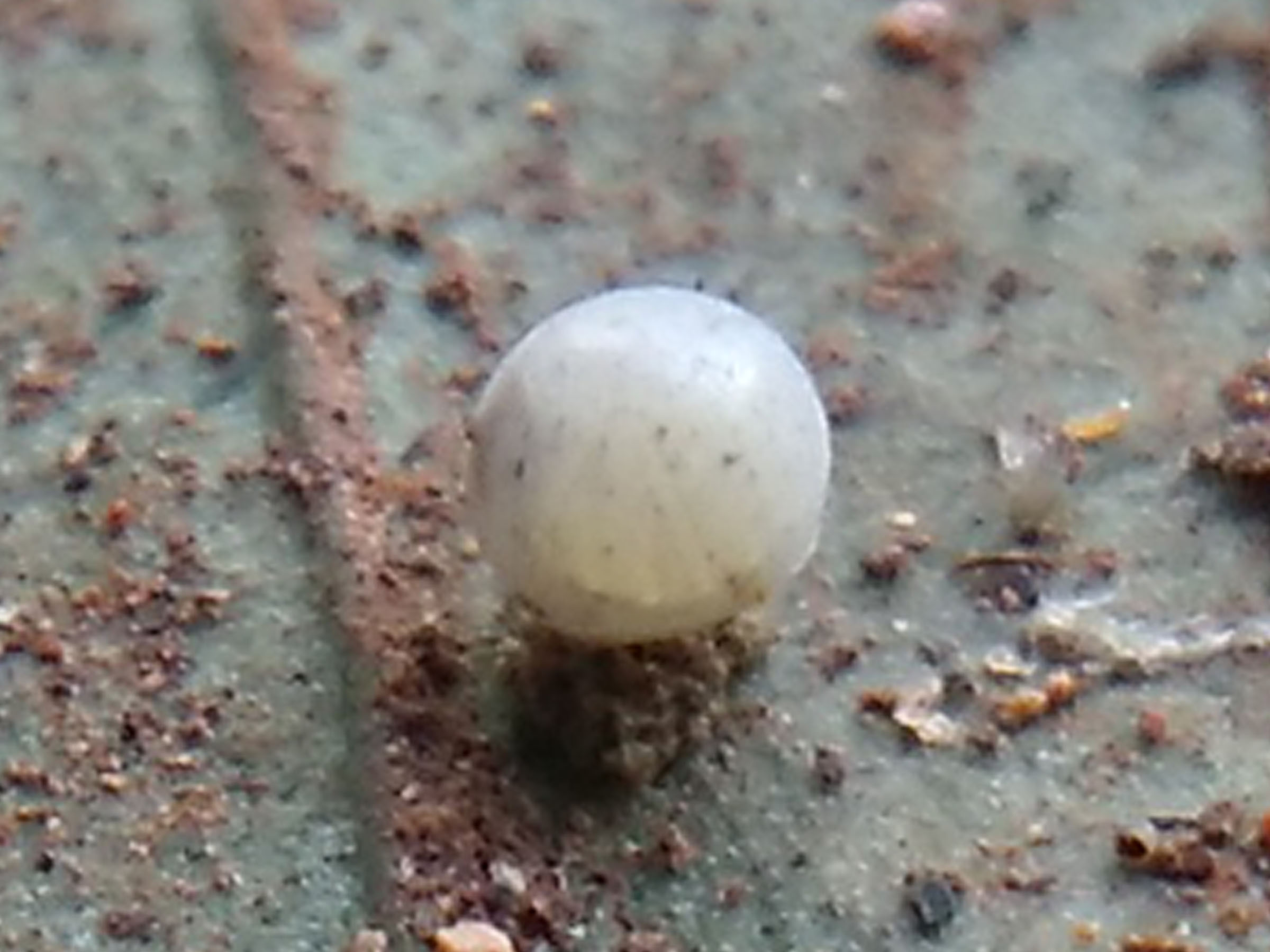
Egg

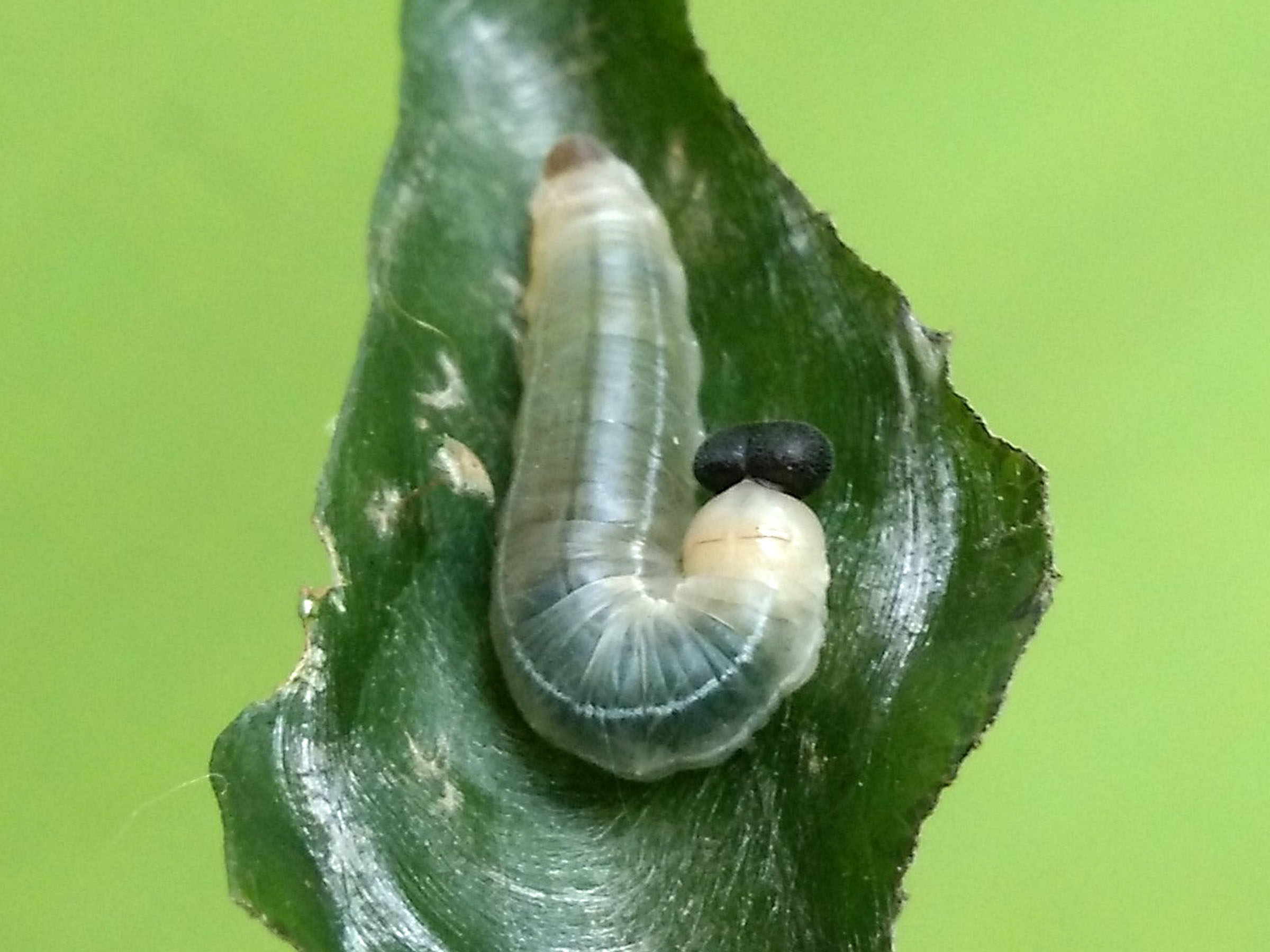
Larva

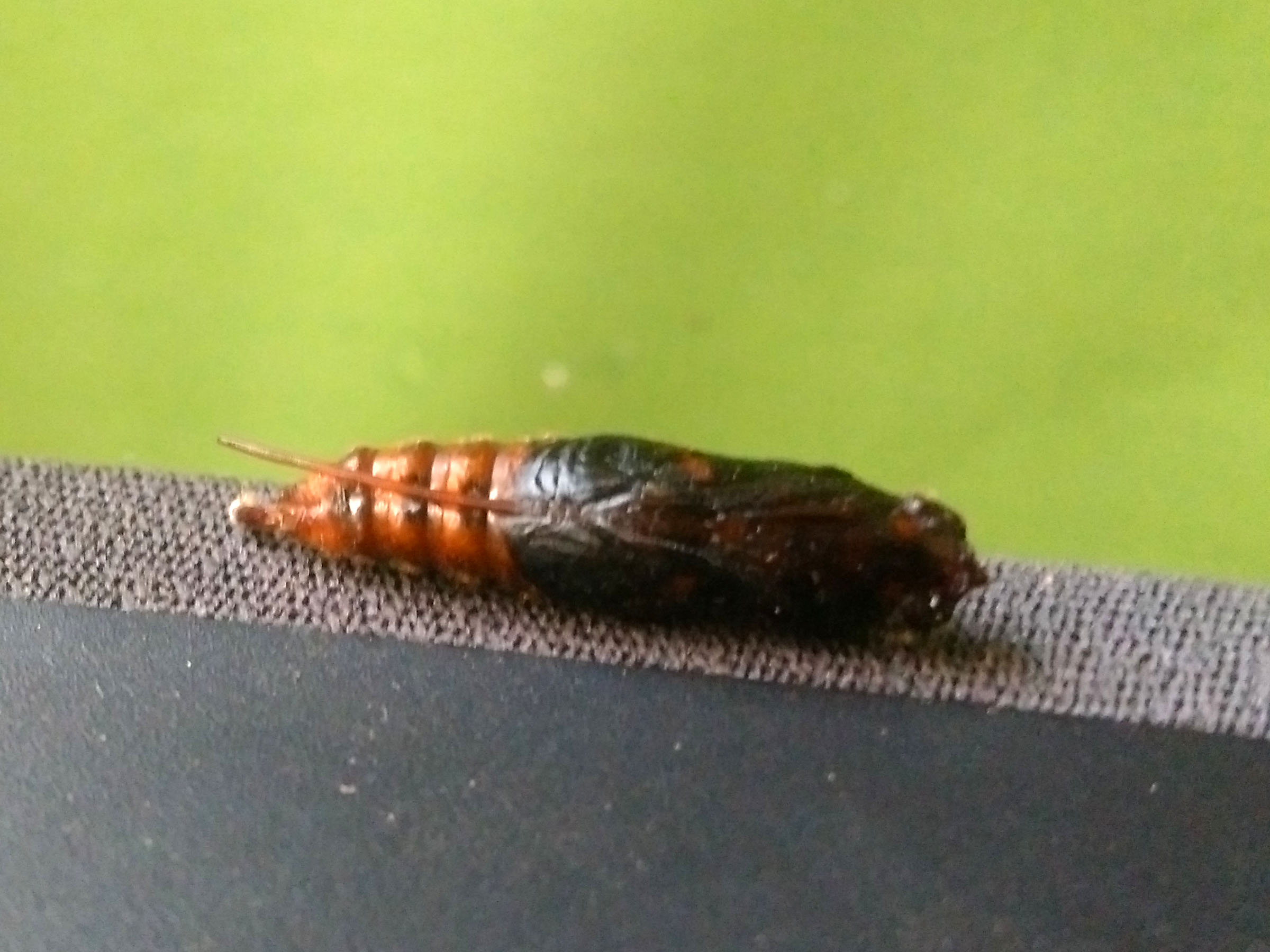
Pupa

===== Celaenorrhinus putra (restricted spotted flat) =====
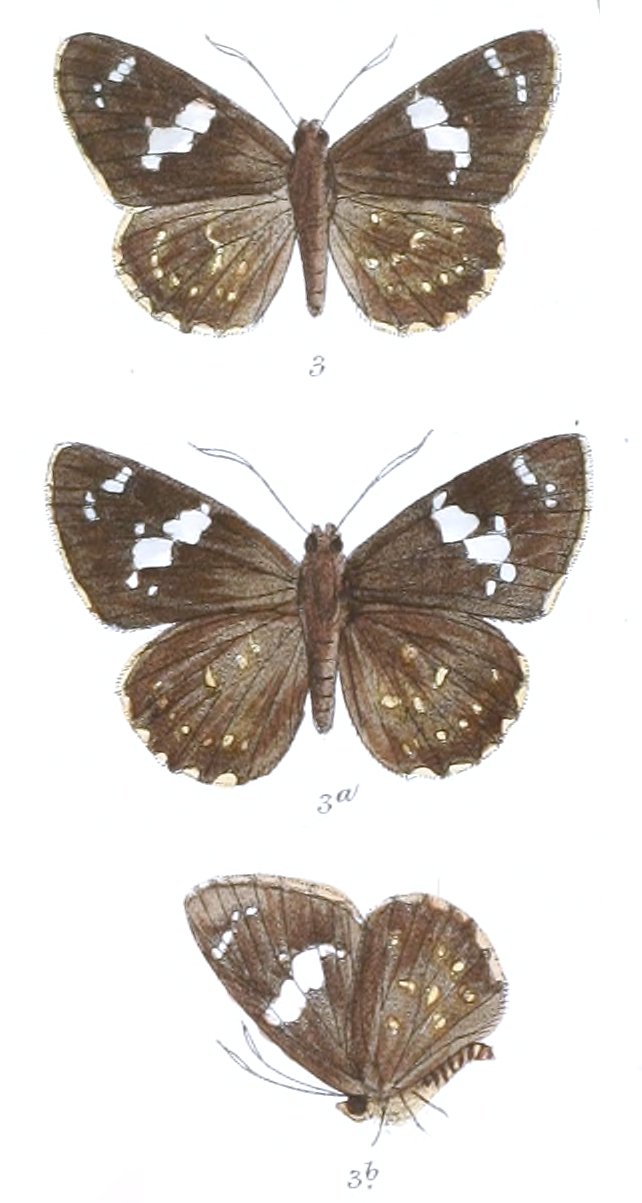
Illustration

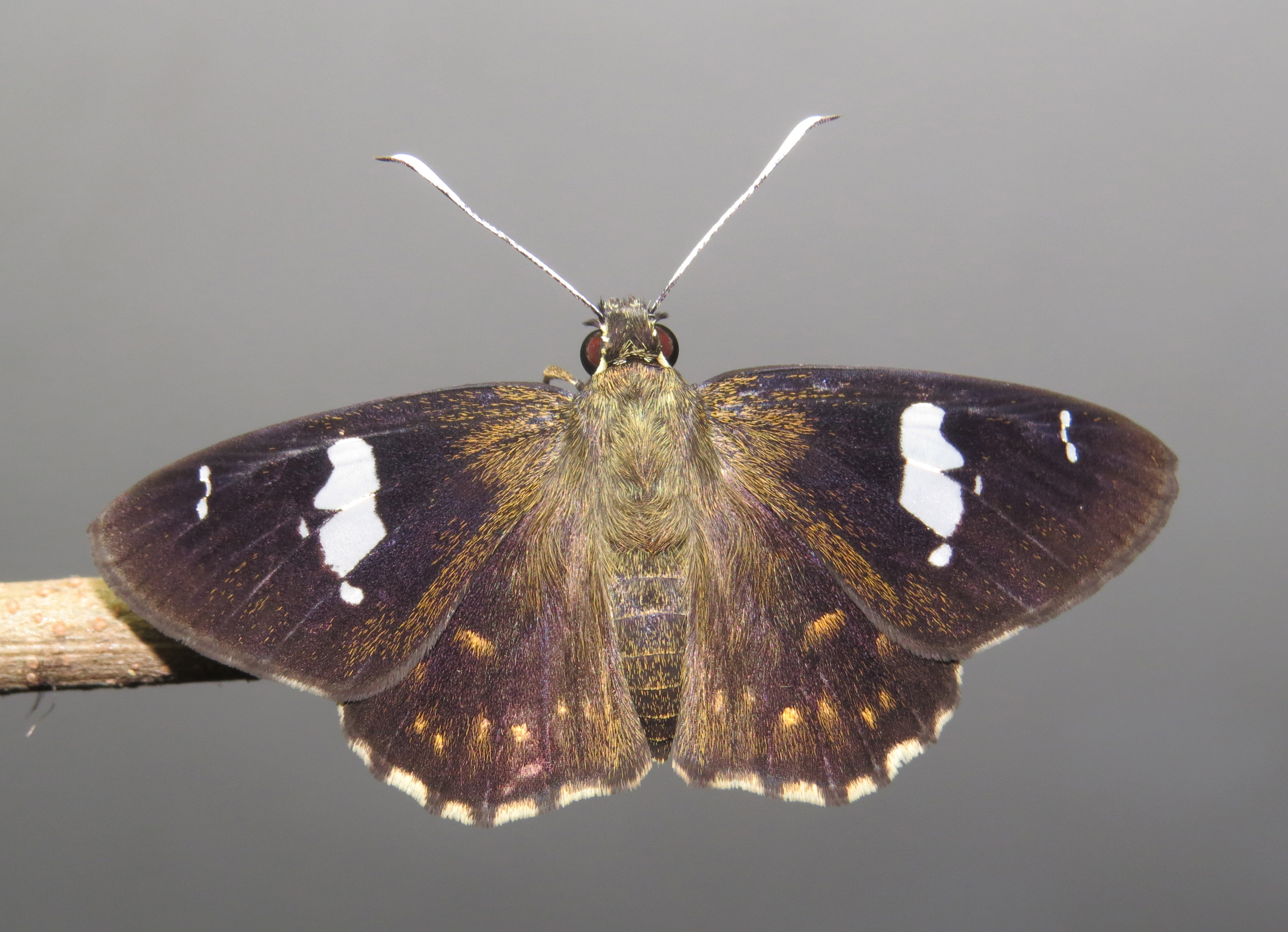
Dorsal view

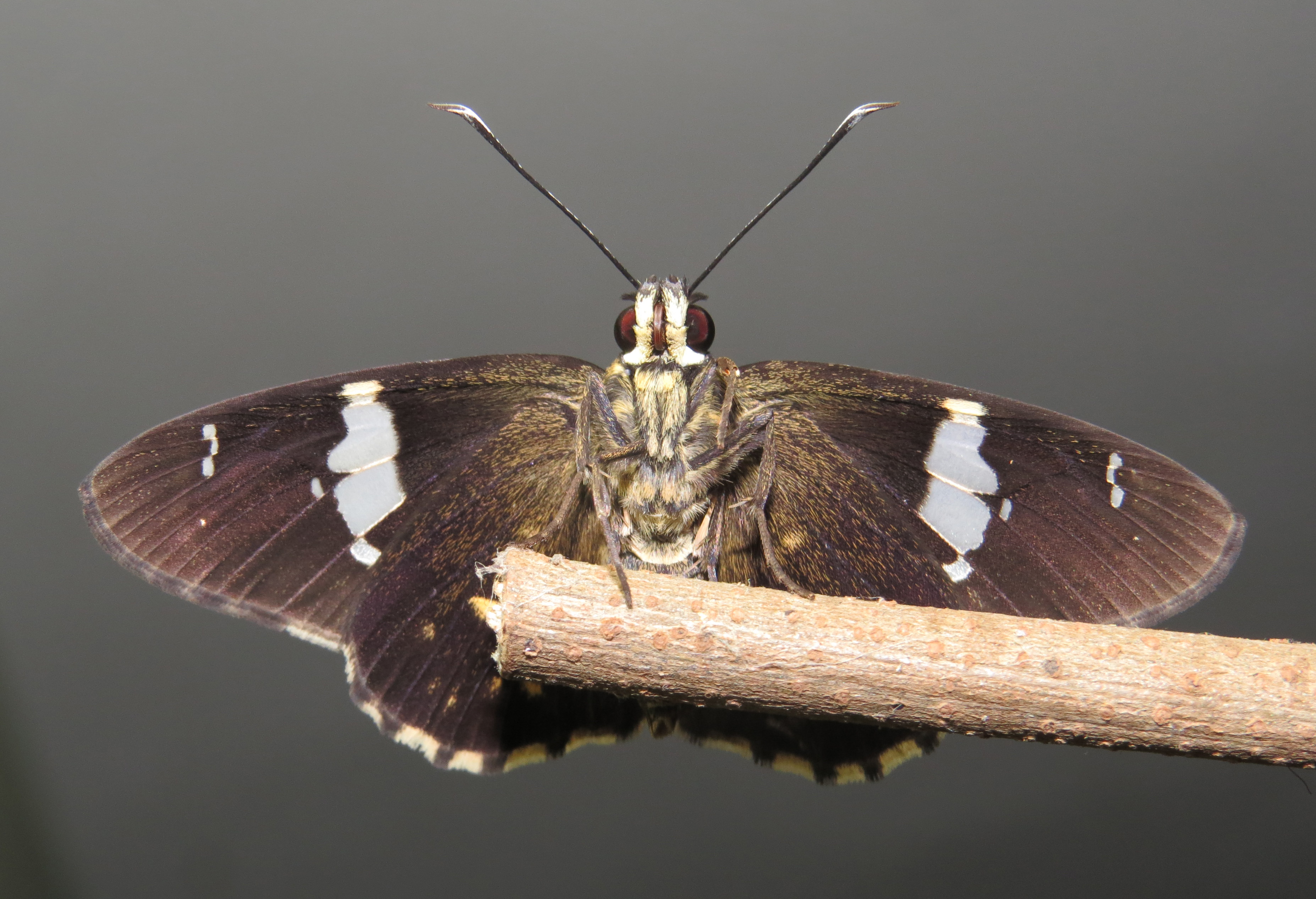
Ventral view

===== Celaenorrhinus ruficornis fusca (Tamil spotted flat) =====
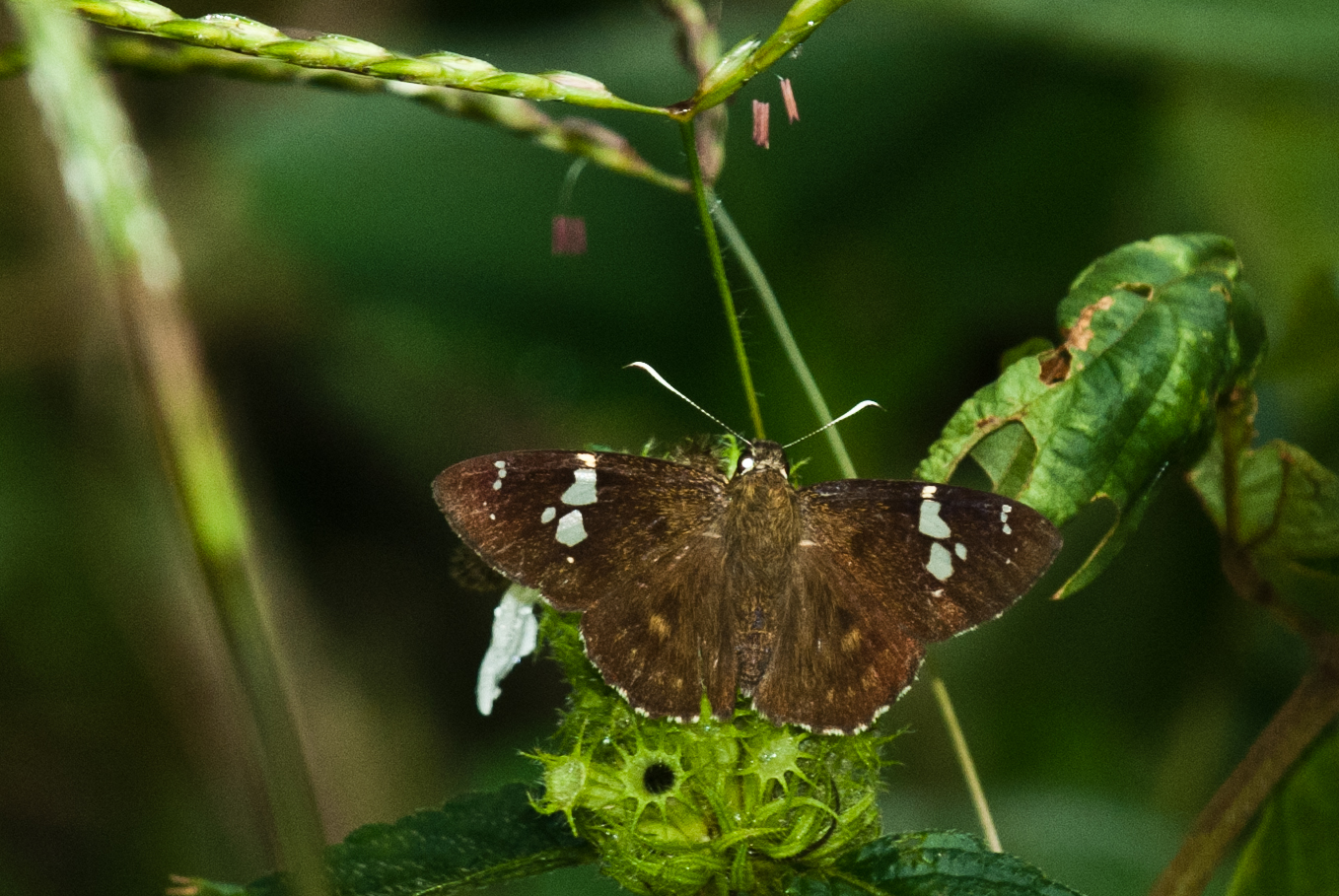
Dorsal view

==== Genus: Coladenia ====
===== Coladenia indrani (tricolour pied flat) =====
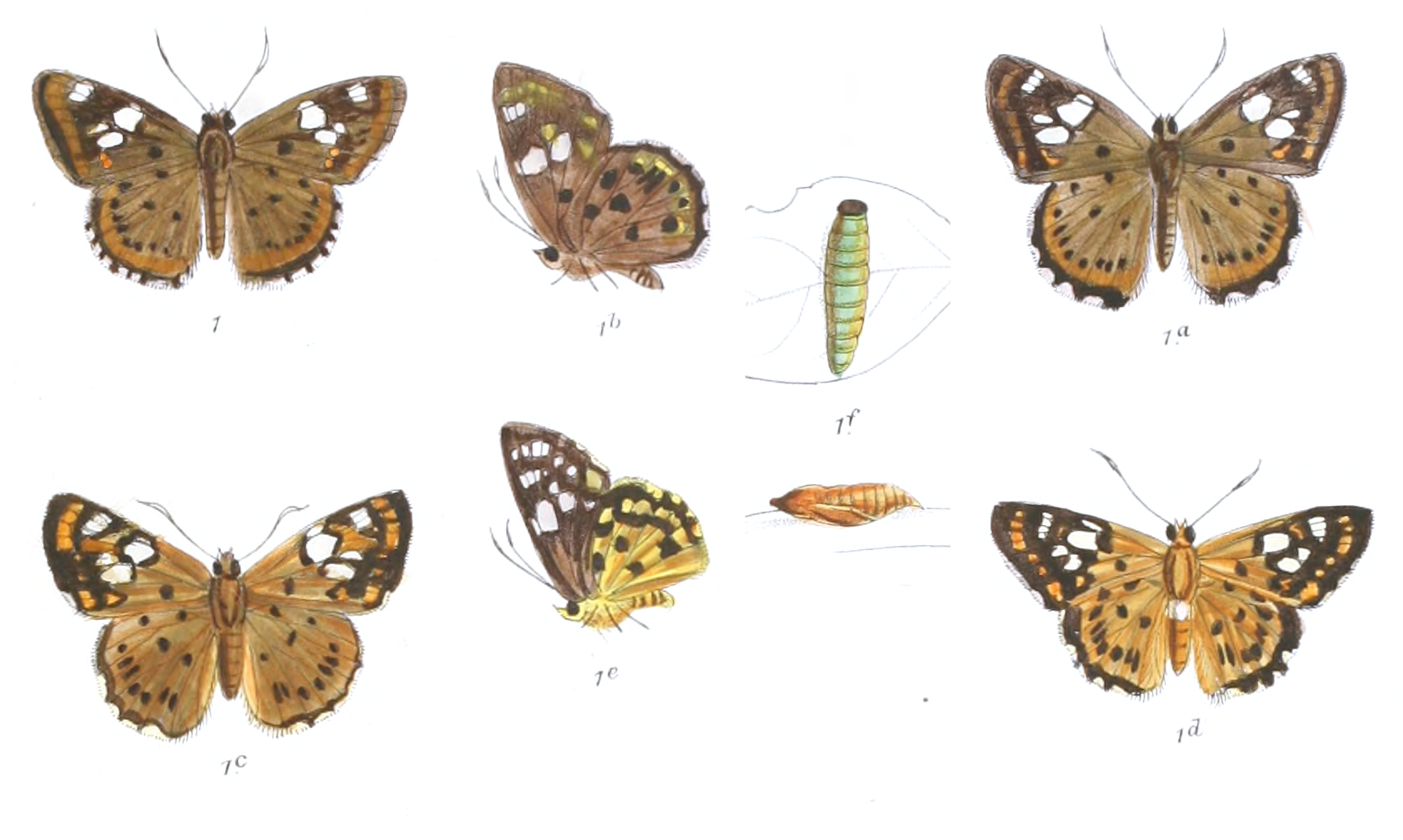
Illustration

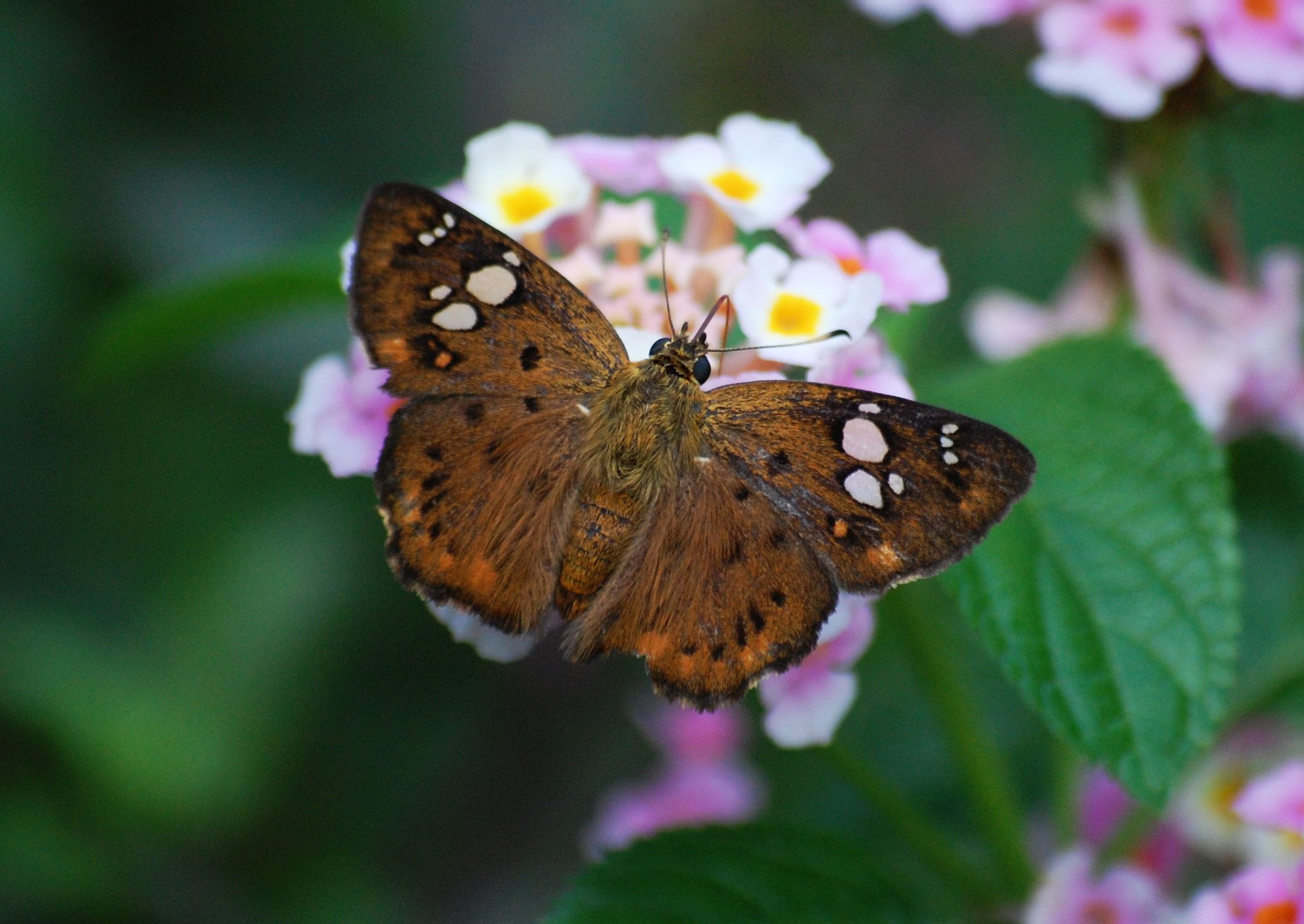
Dorsal view

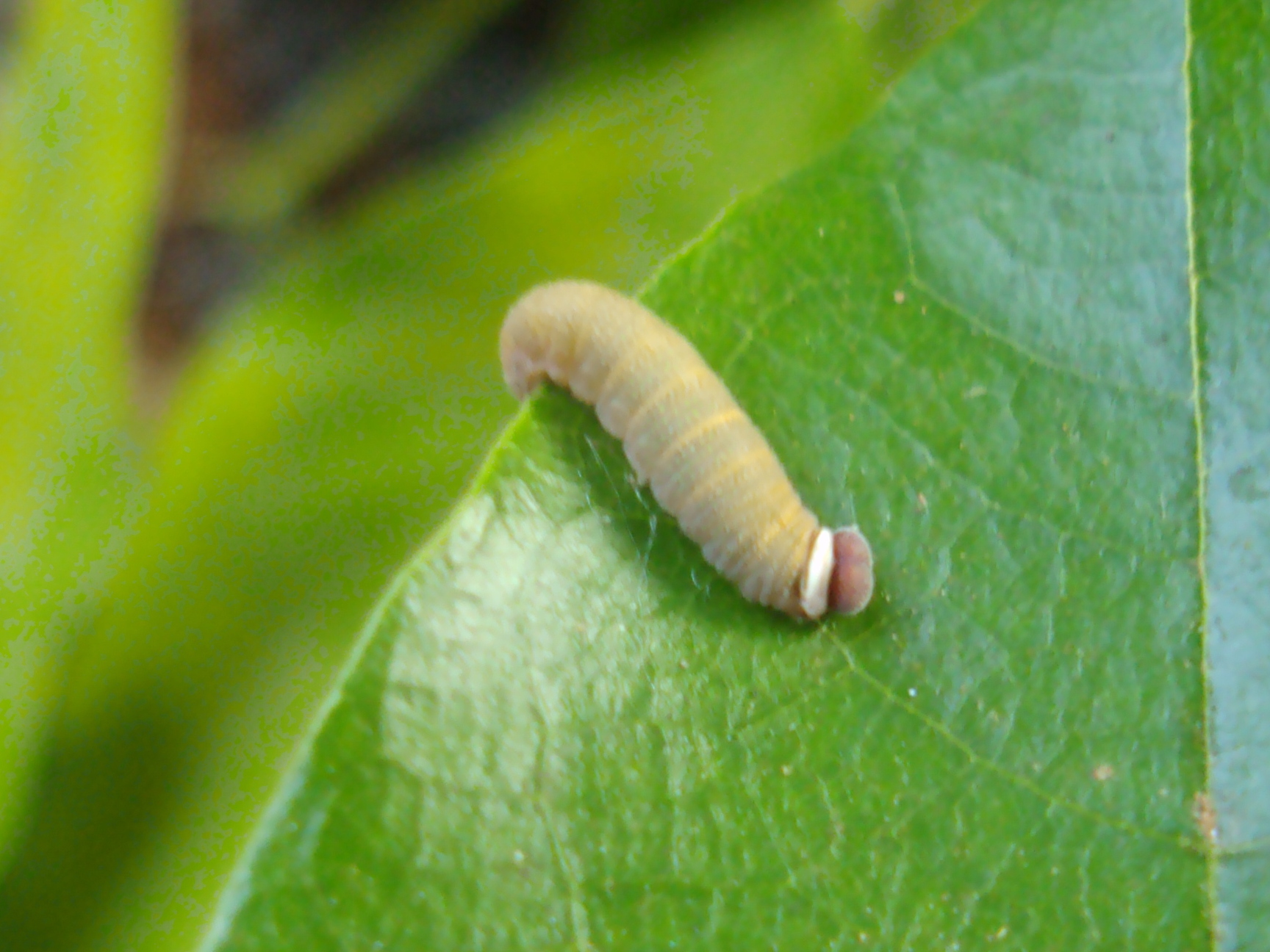
Larva

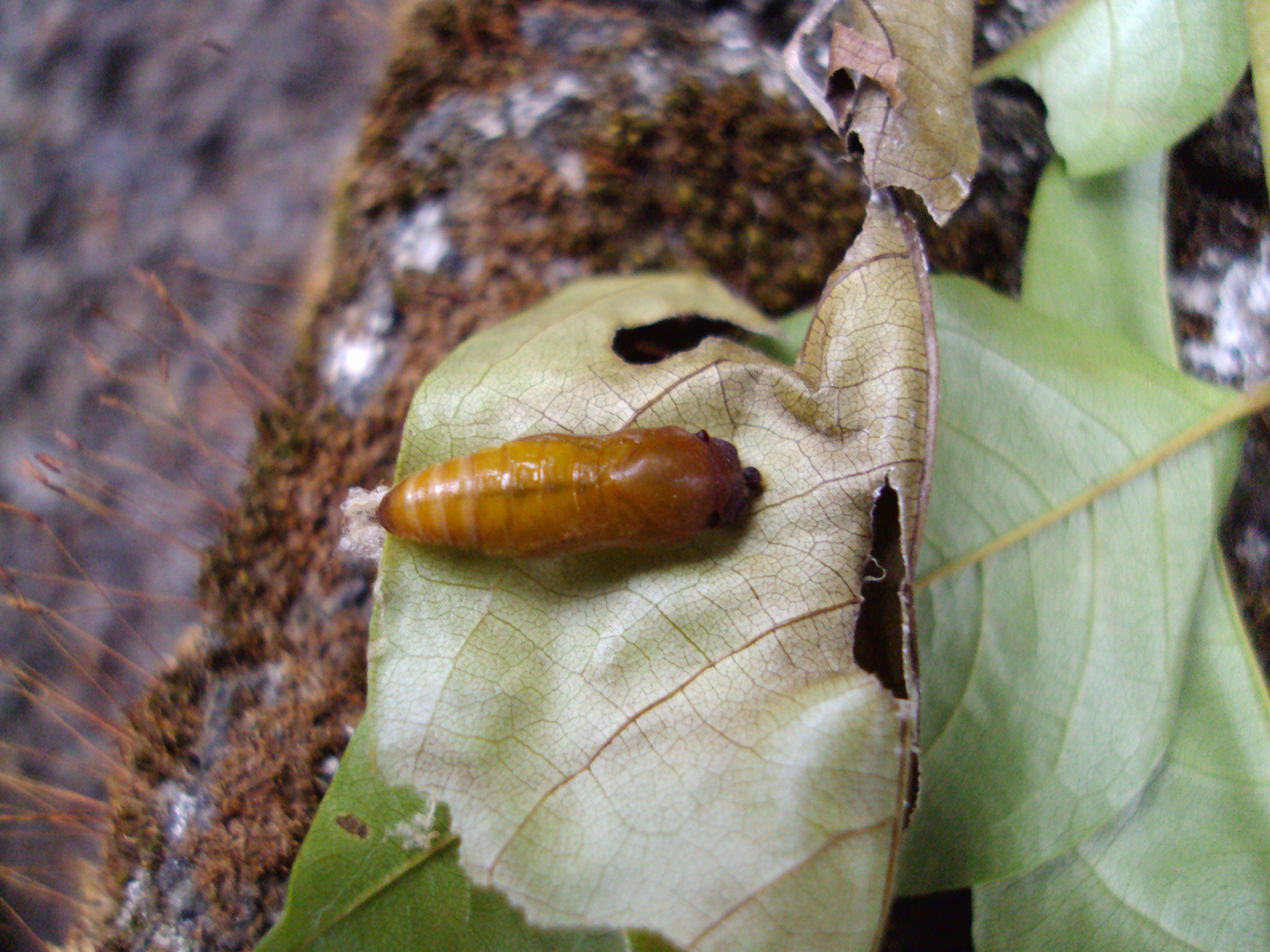
Pupa

==== Genus: Gerosis ====
===== Gerosis bhagava (common yellowbreast flat) =====
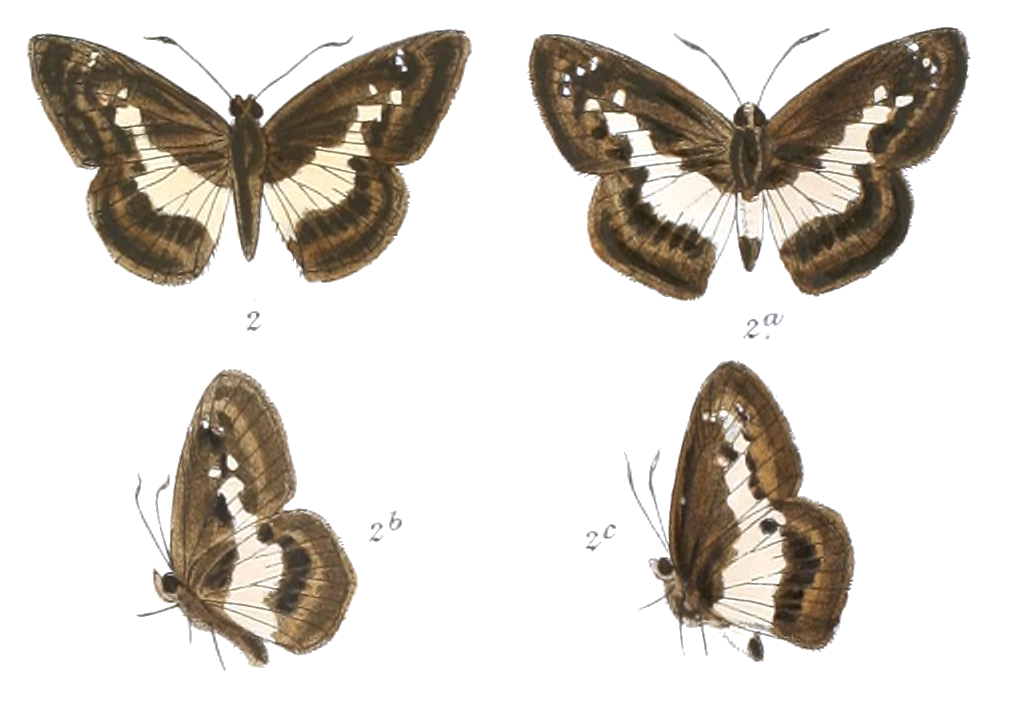
Illustration

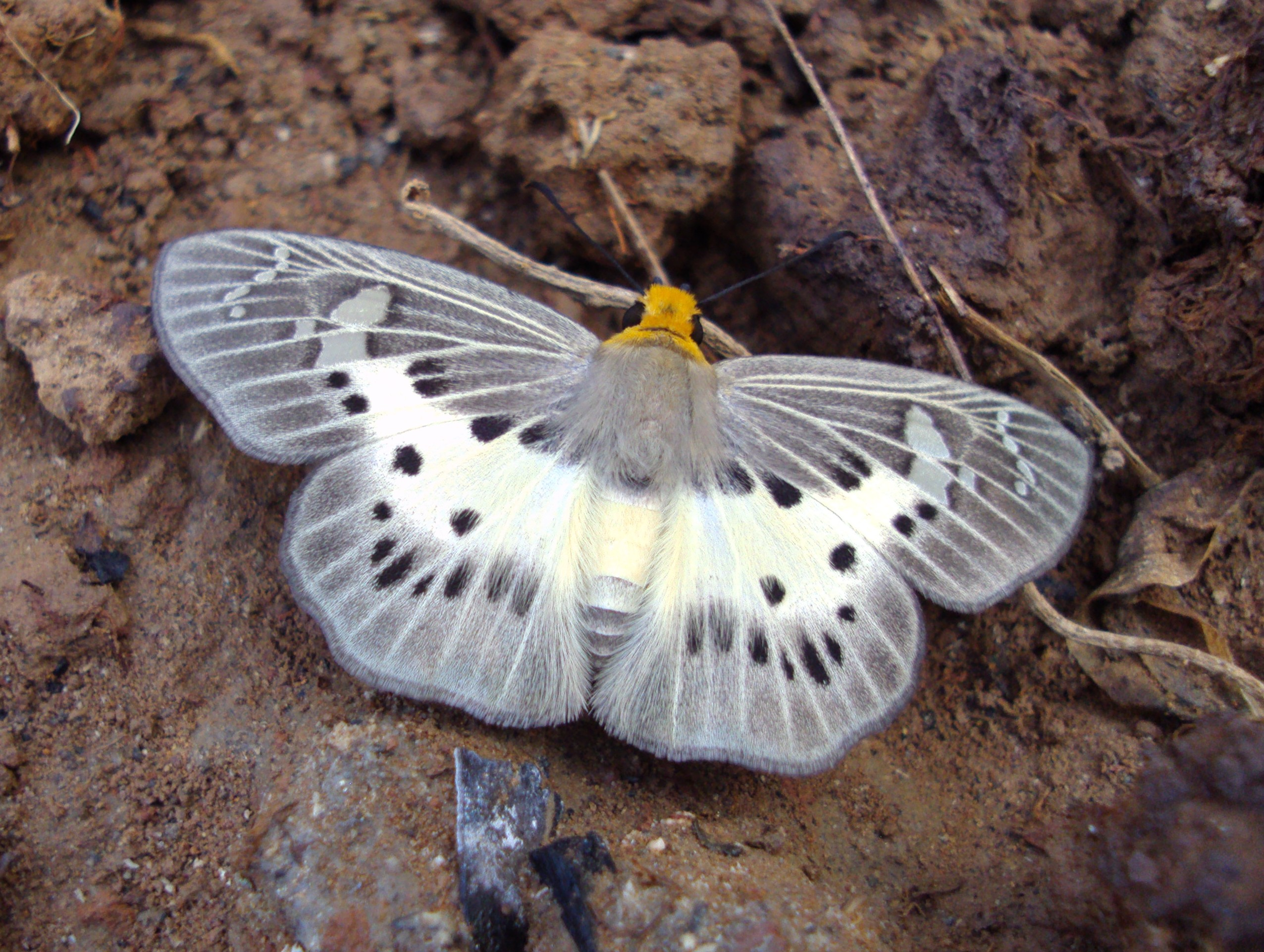
Dorsal view

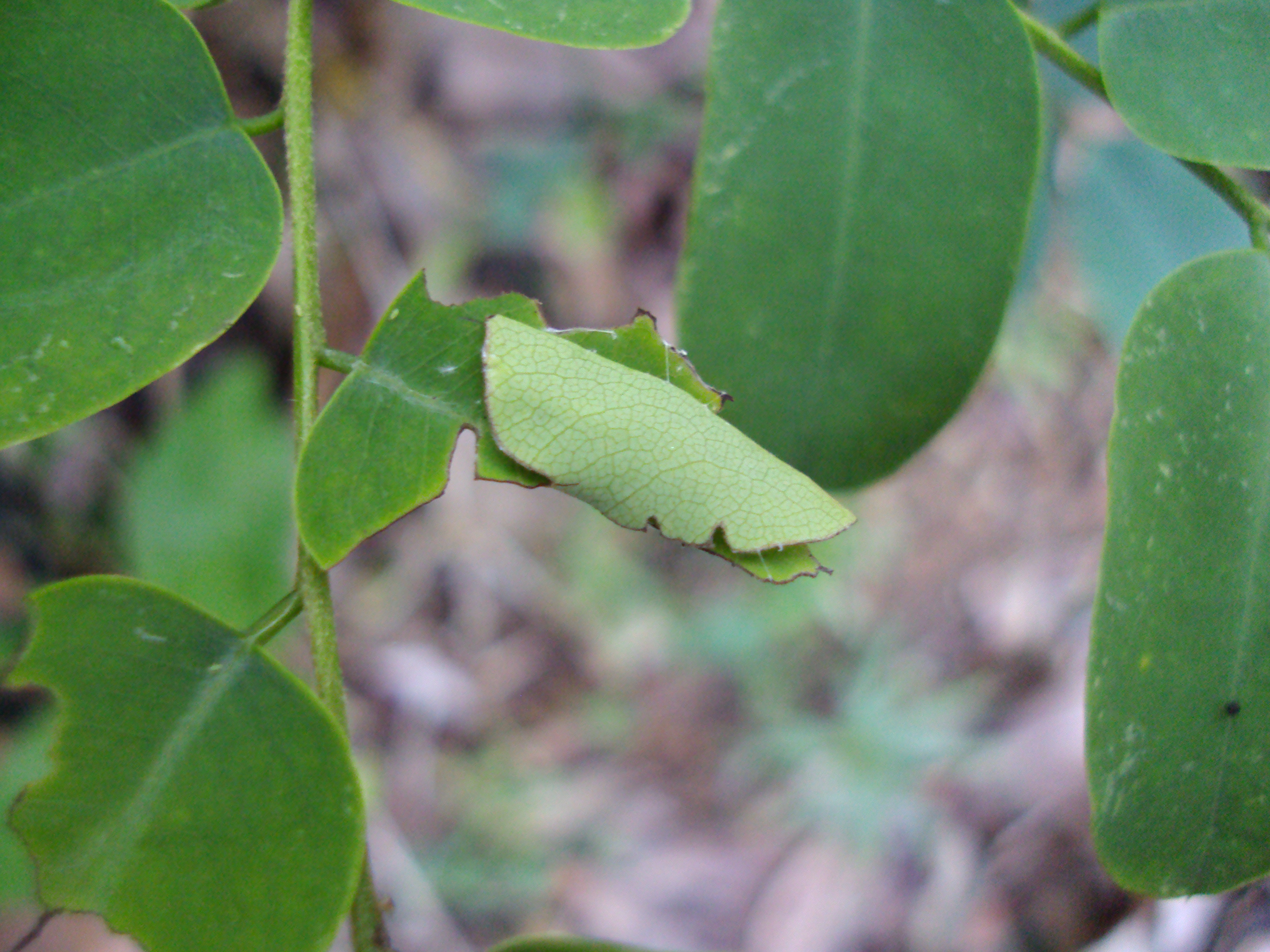
Larva

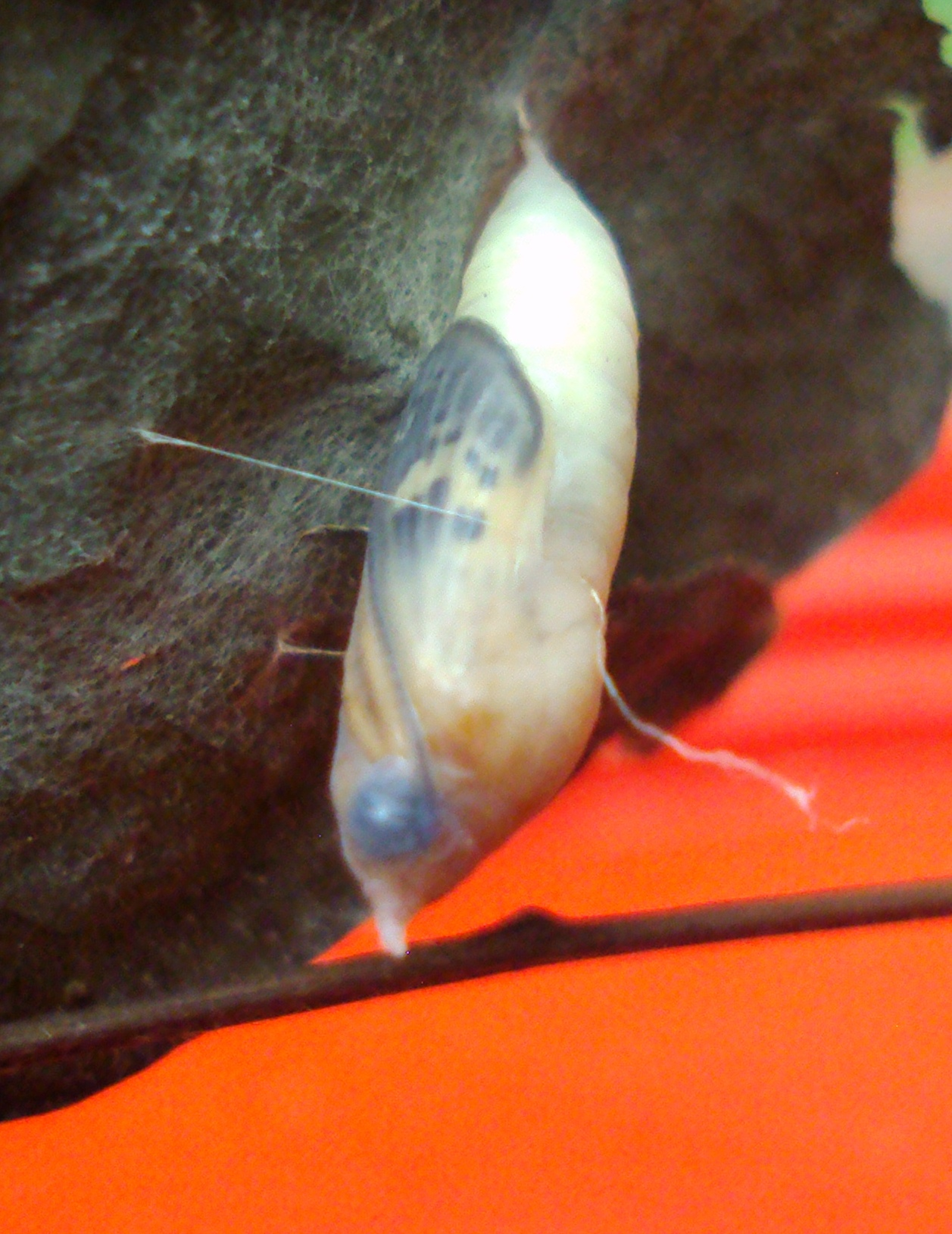
Pupa

==== Genus: Gomalia ====
===== Gomalia elma (African marbled skipper) =====
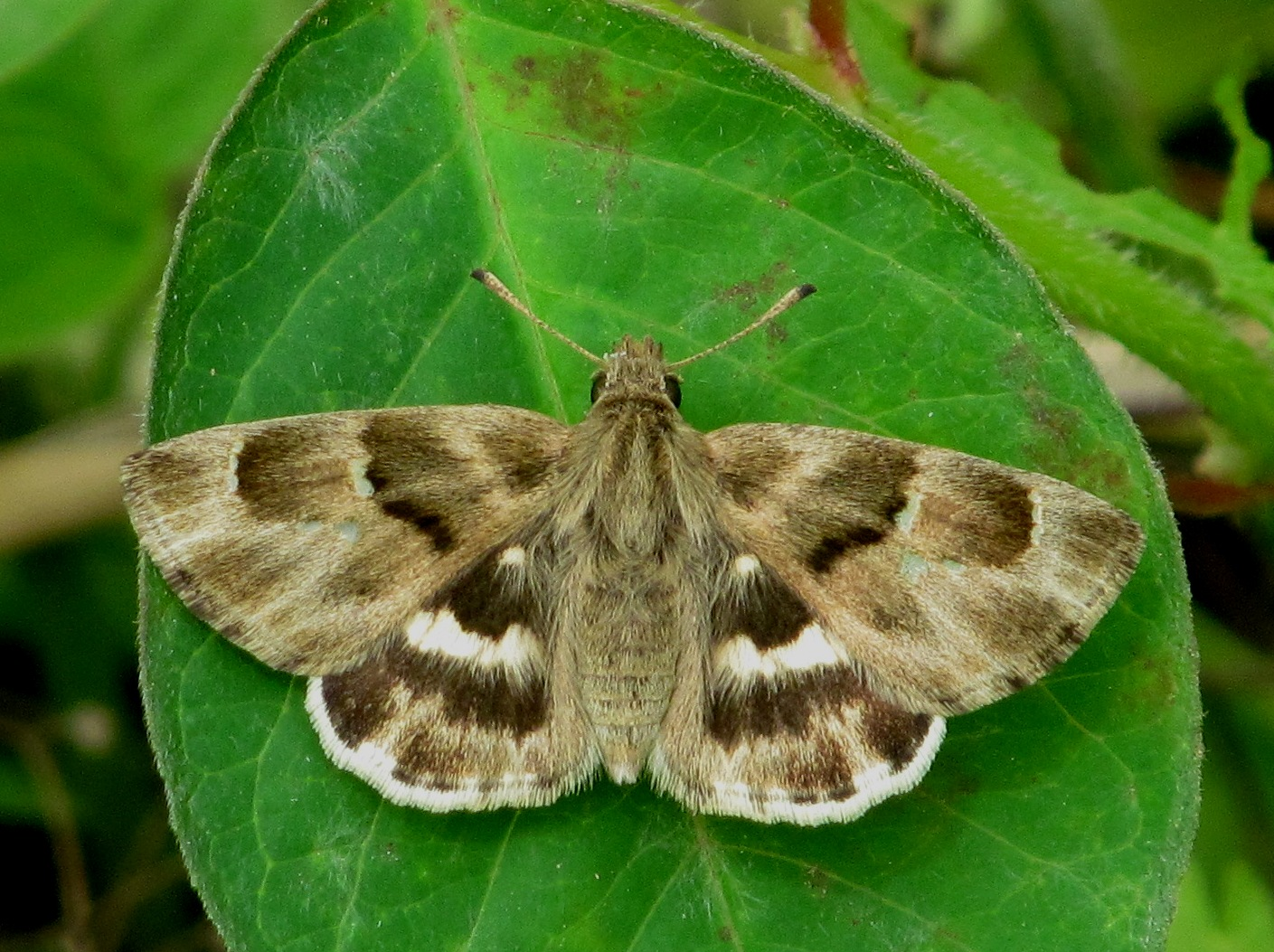
Dorsal view

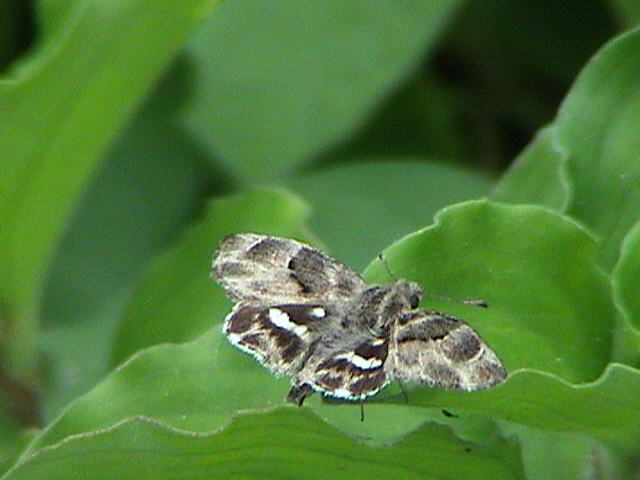
Dorsal view

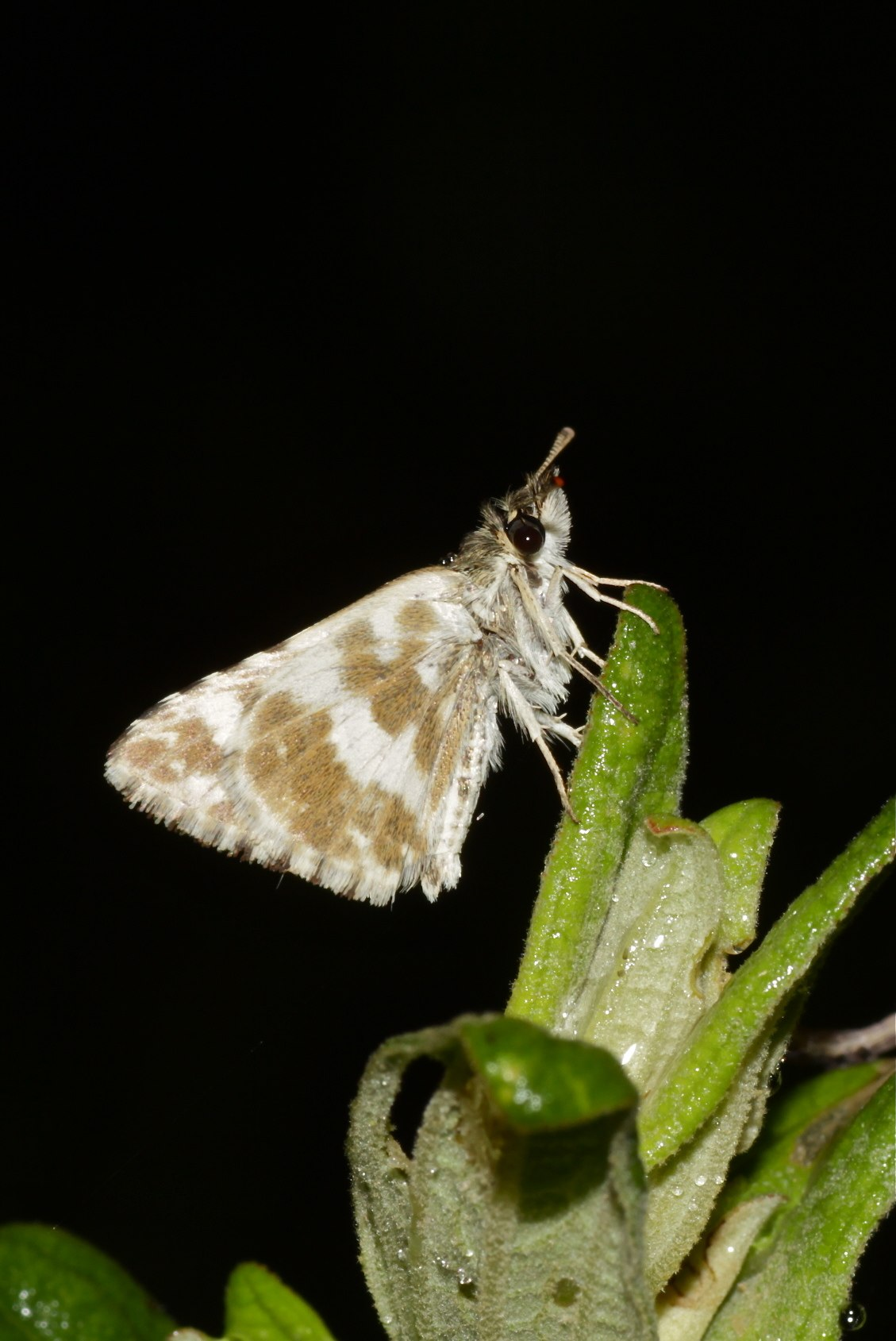
Ventral view

==== Genus: Odontoptilum ====
===== Odontoptilum angulata (chestnut angle) =====
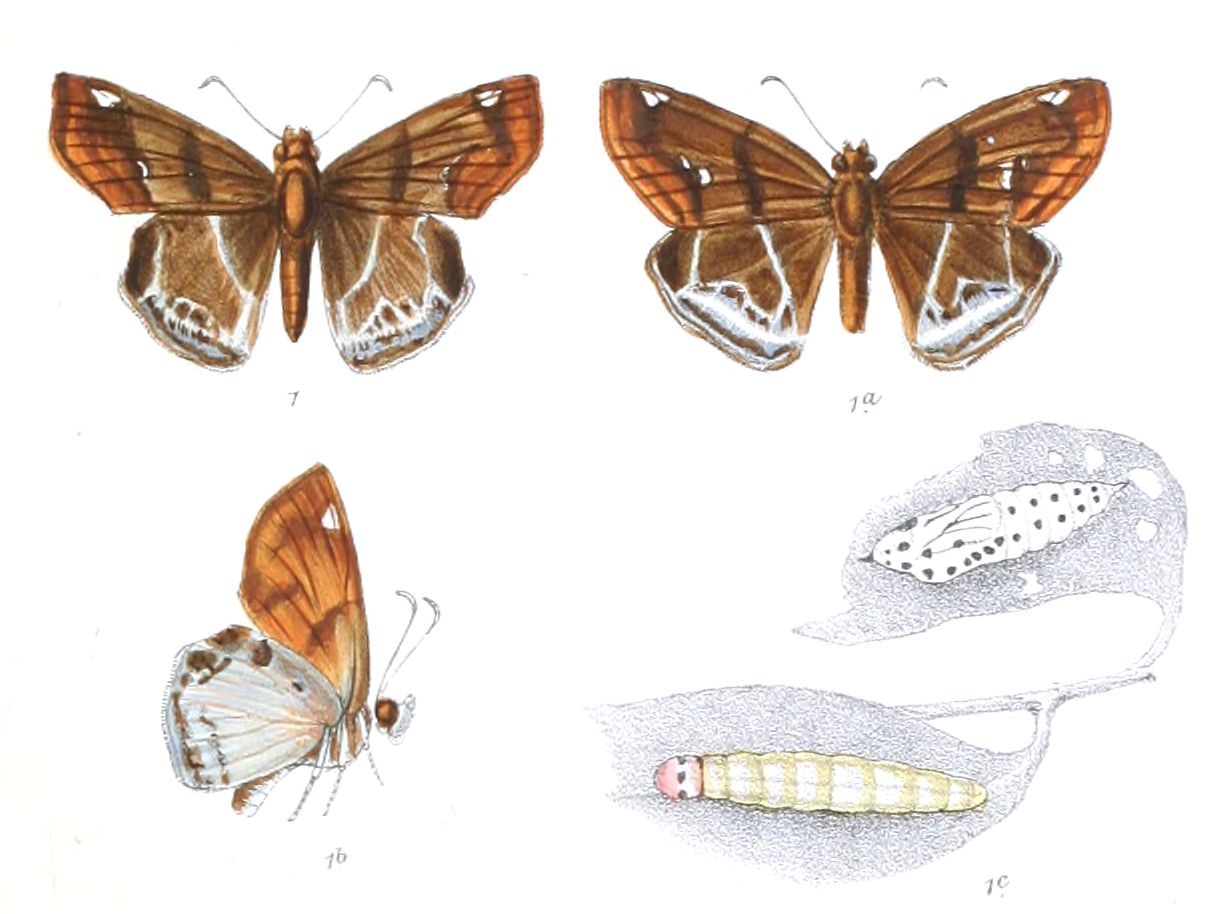
Illustration

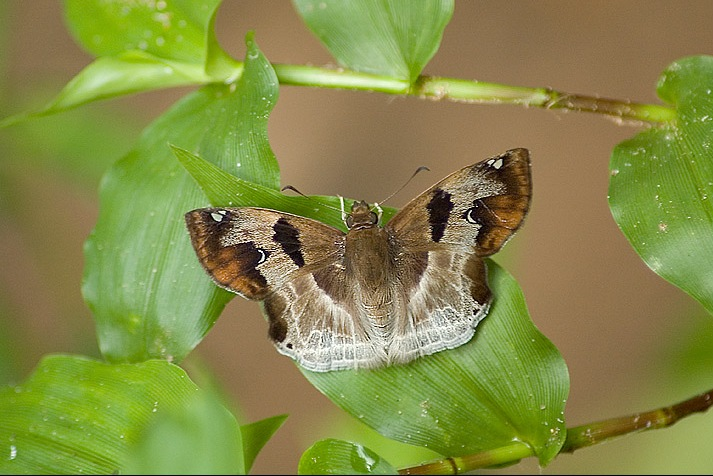
Dorsal view

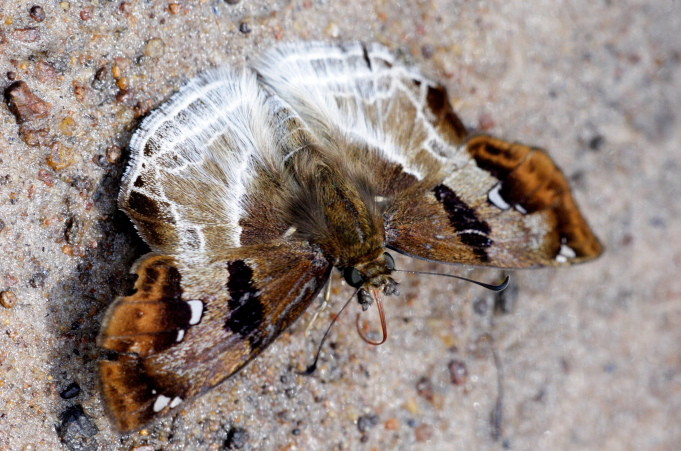
Dorsal view

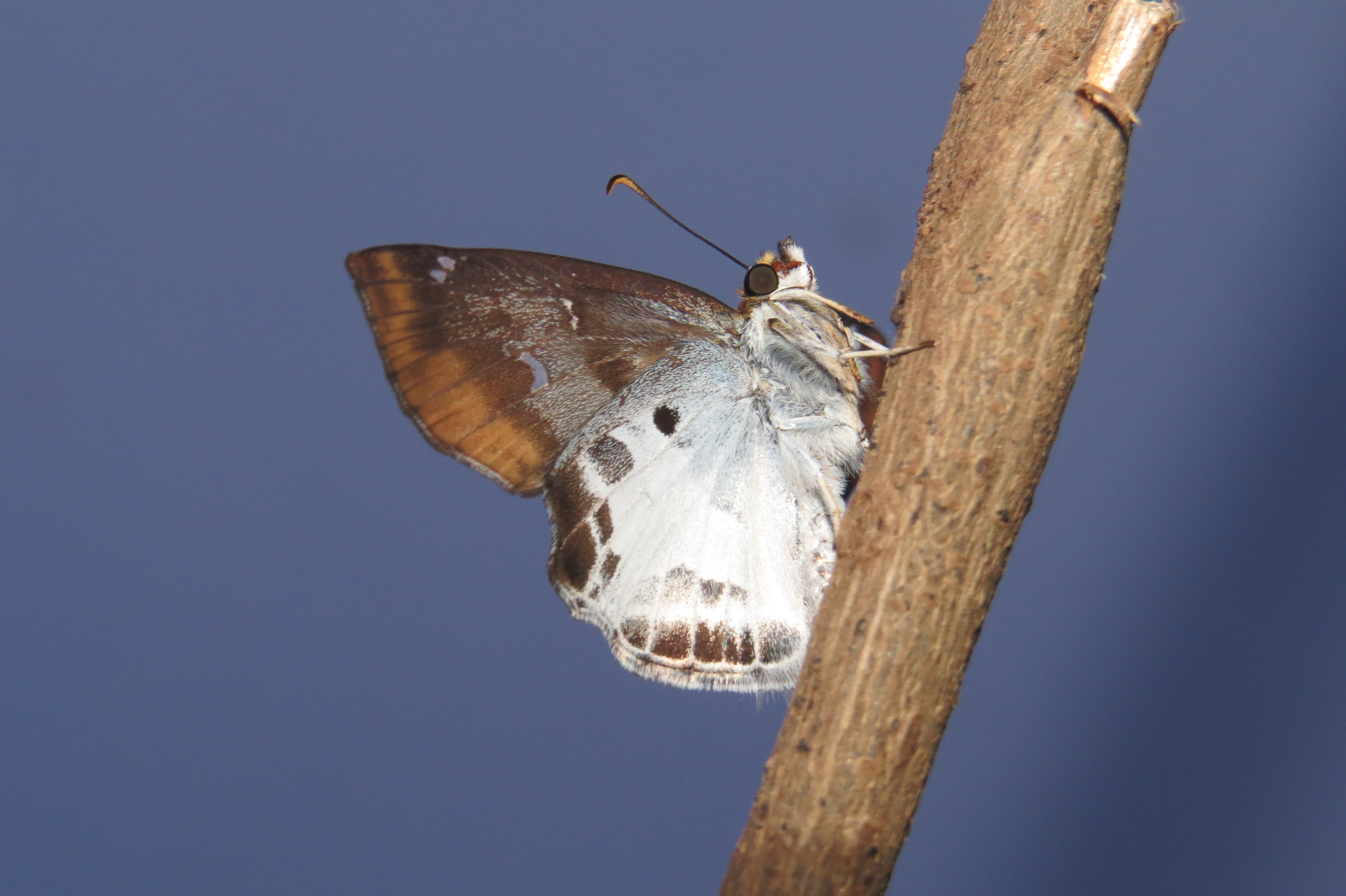
ventral view

==== Genus: Pseudocoladenia ====
===== Pseudocoladenia dan (fulvous pied flat) =====
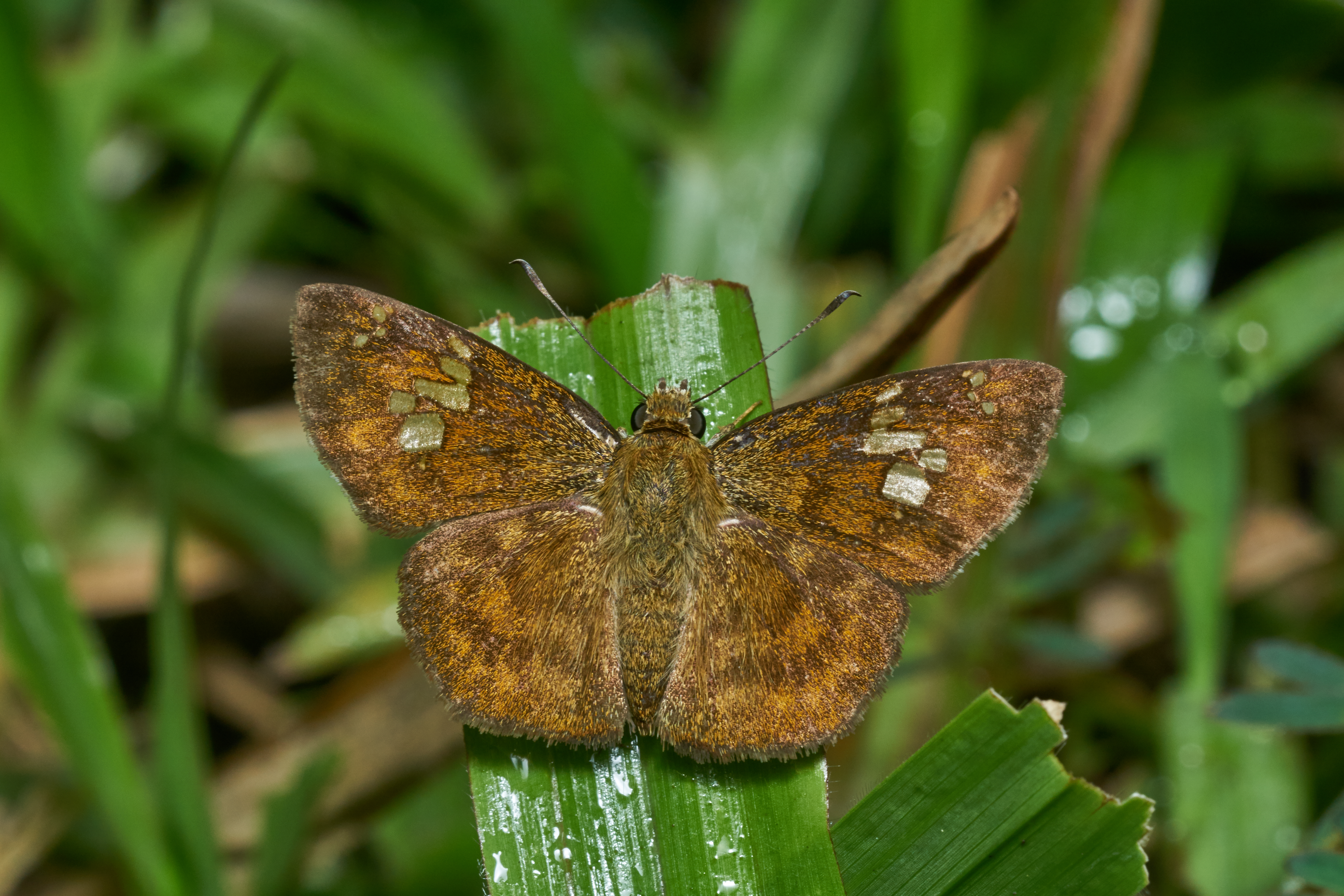
Dorsal view

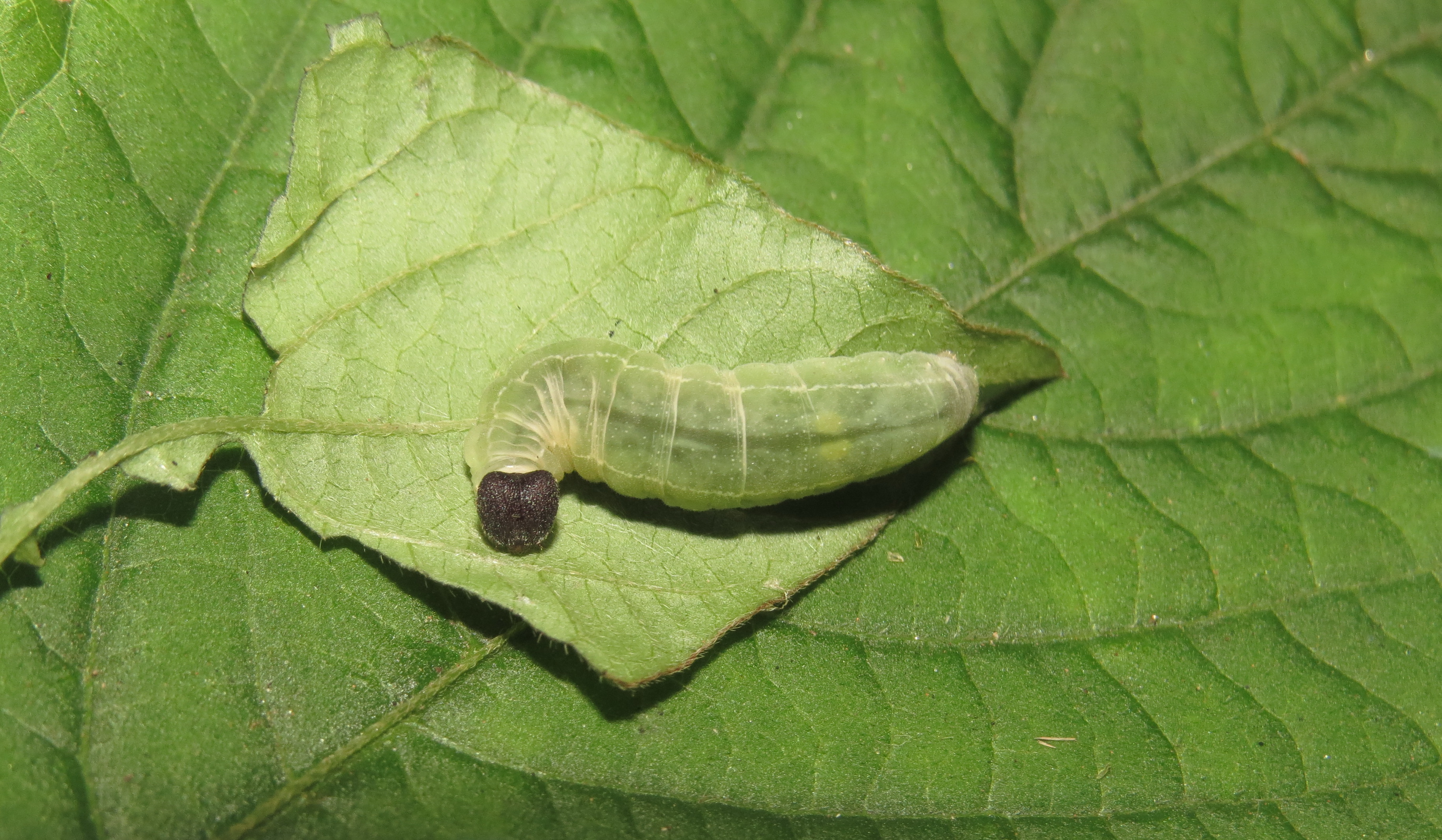
Larva

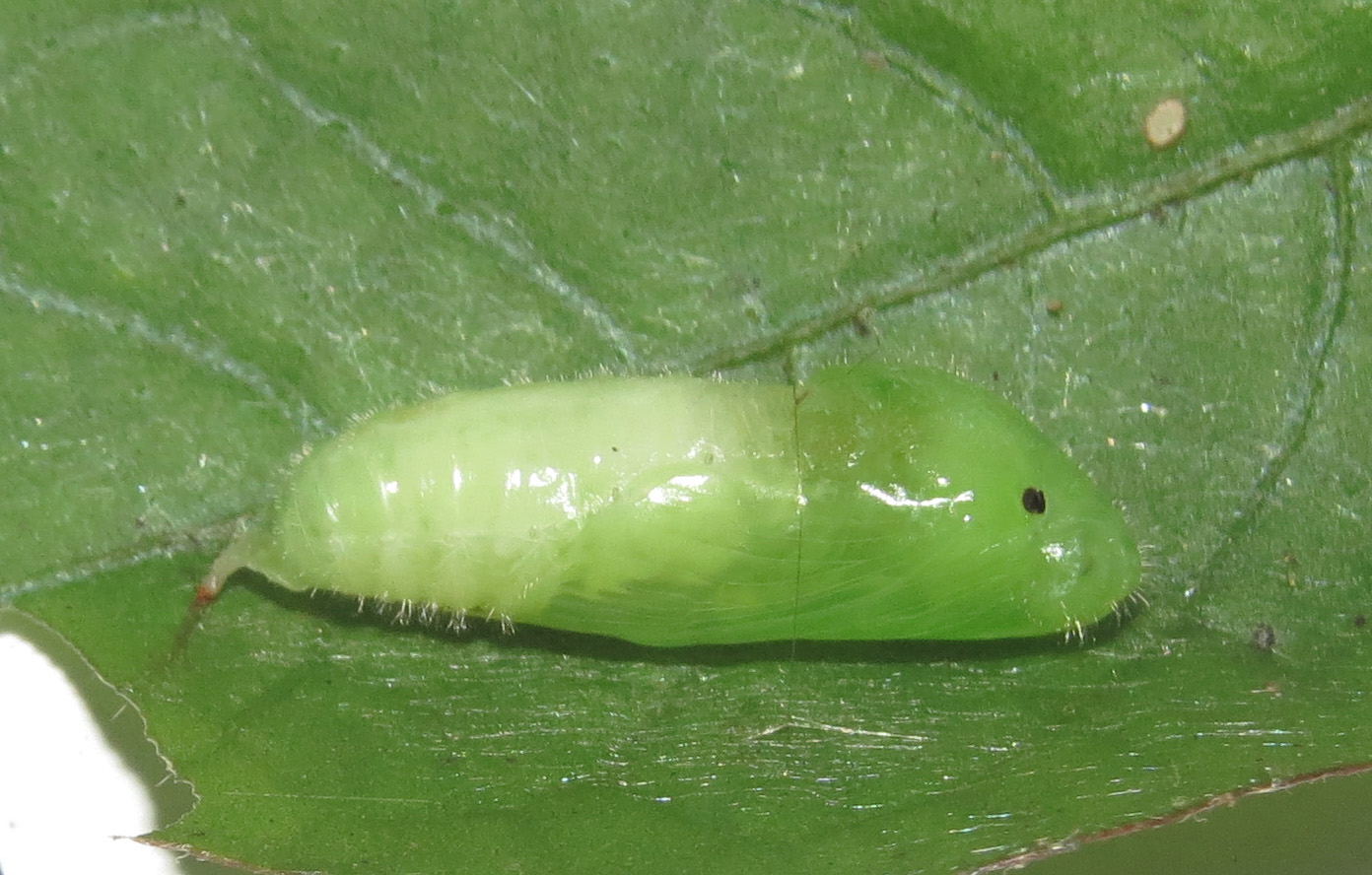
Pupa

==== Genus: Sarangesa ====
===== Sarangesa dasahara (common small flat) =====
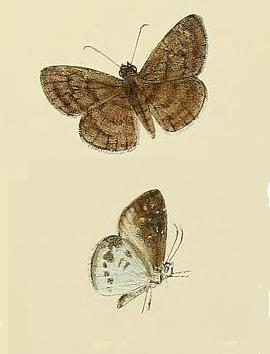
Illustration

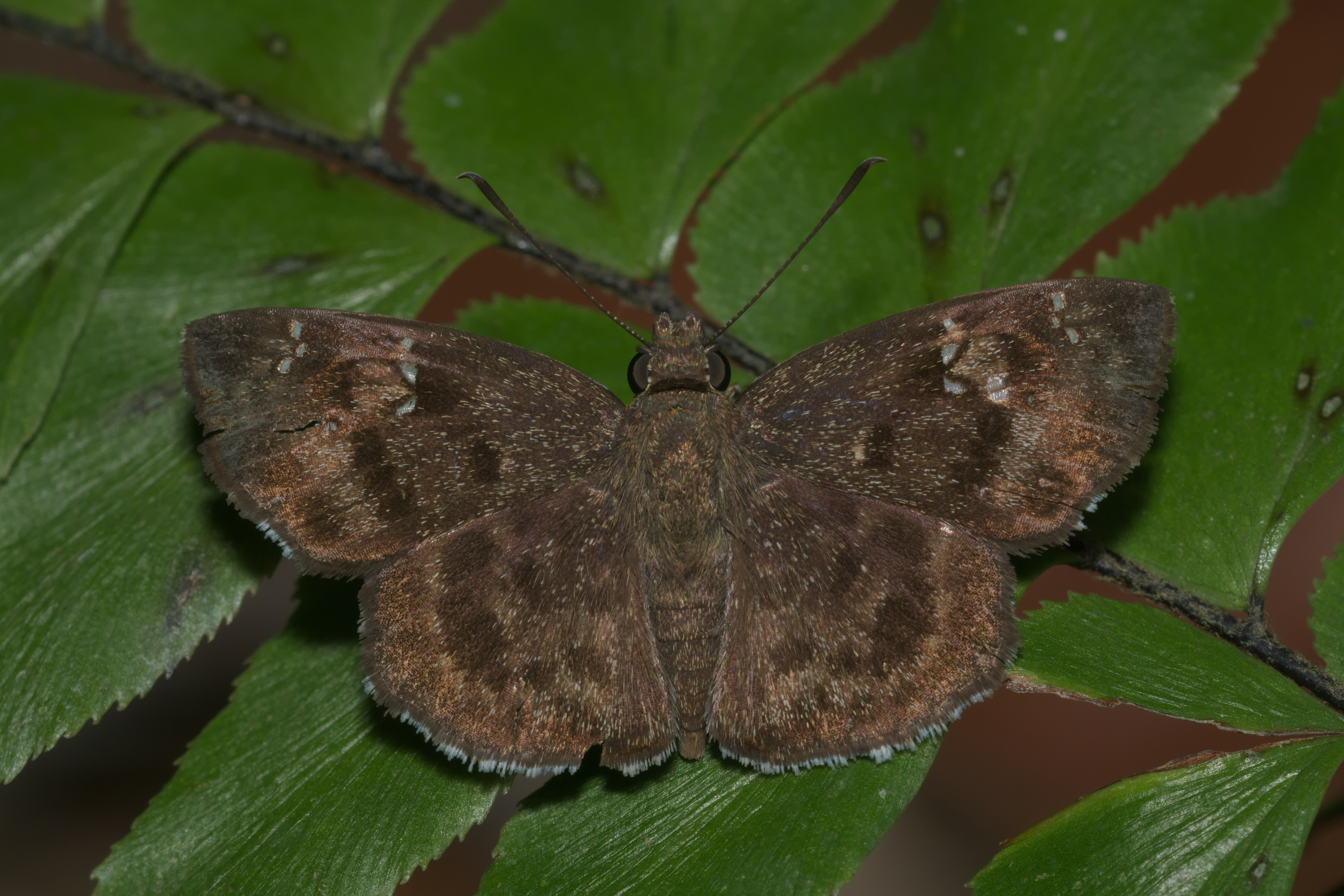
Dorsal view

===== Sarangesa purendra (spotted small flat) =====
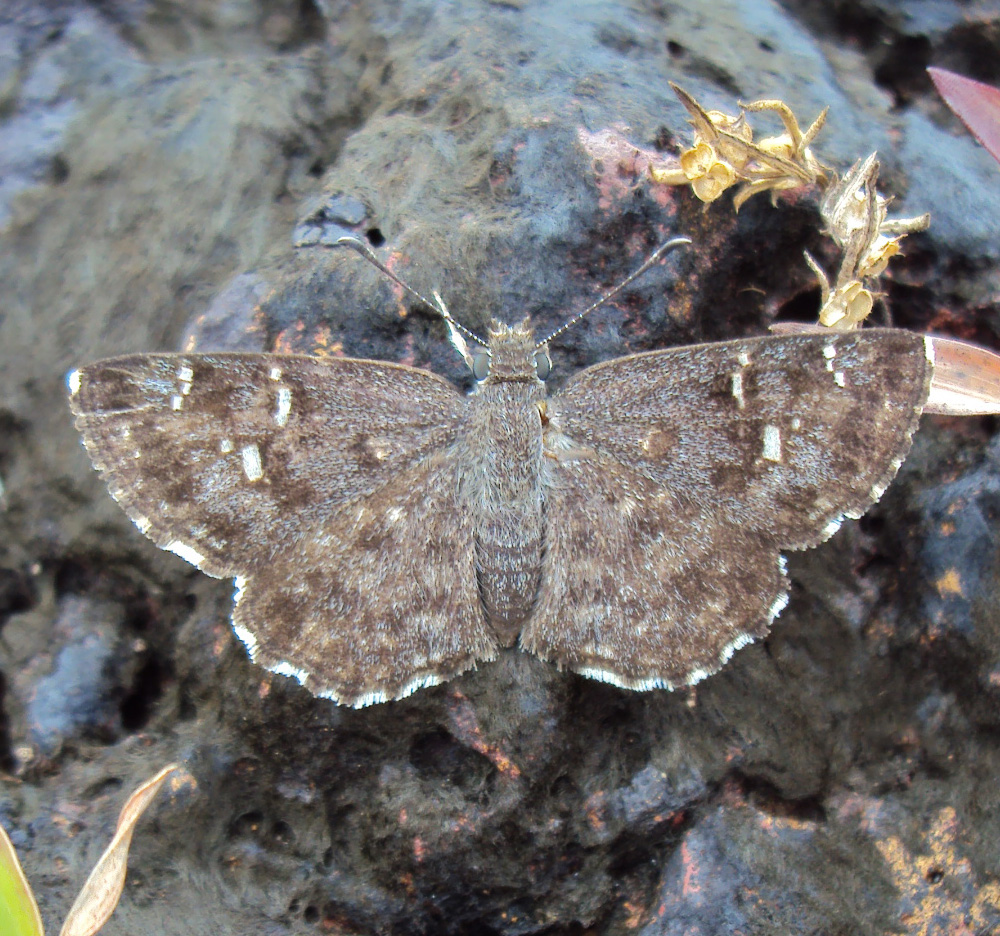
Dorsal view

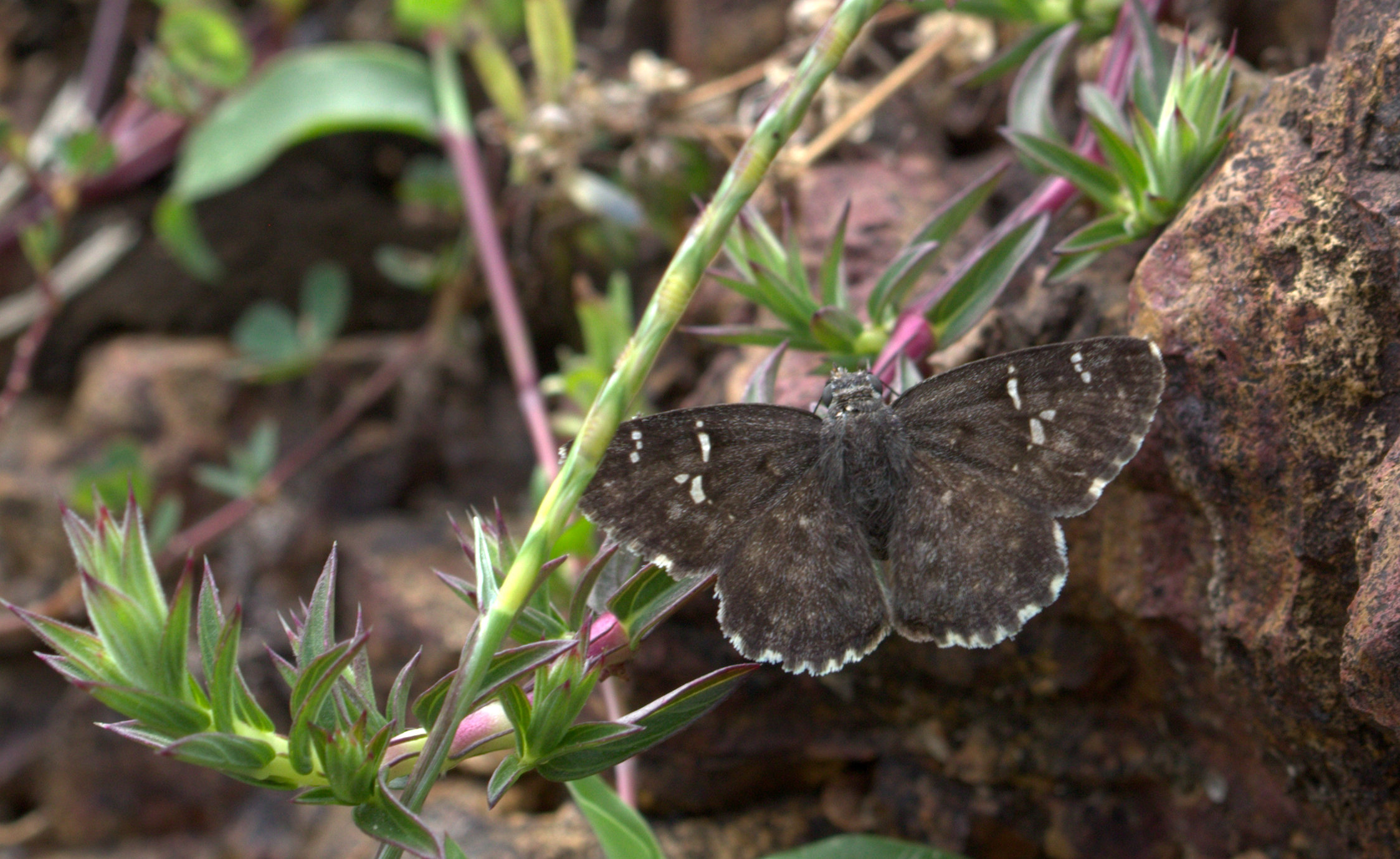
Spotted small flat laying eggs on Lepidagathis keralensis at Madayipara

==== Genus: Spialia ====
===== Spialia galba (Indian skipper) =====
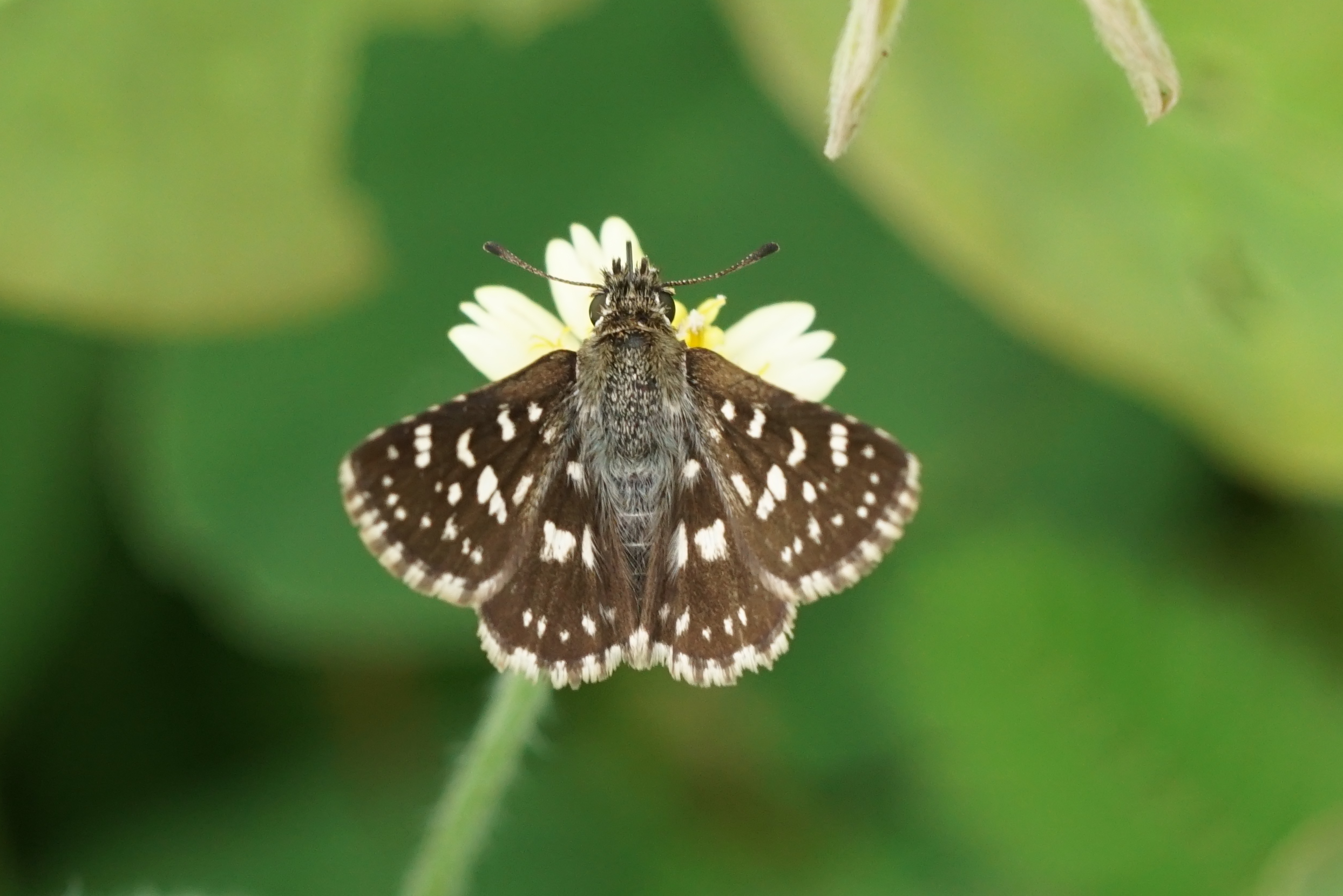
Dorsal view

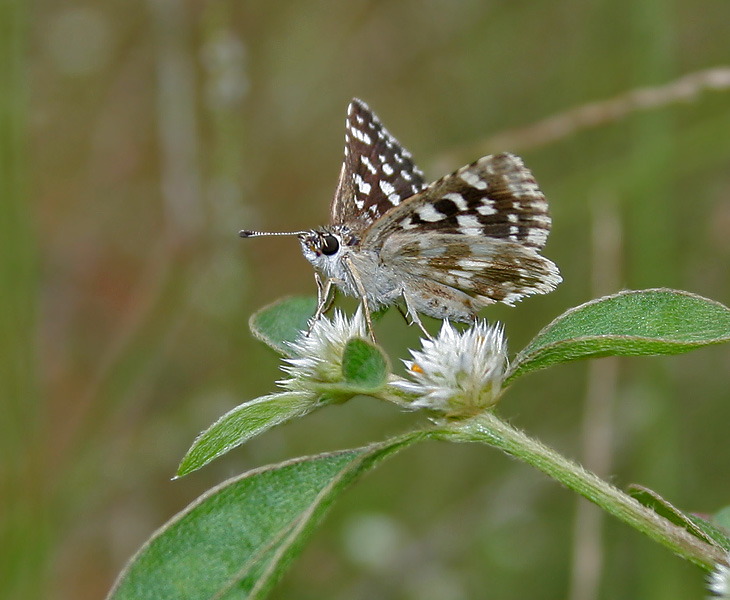
Ventral view

==== Genus: Tagiades ====
===== Tagiades gana (large/suffused snow flat) =====
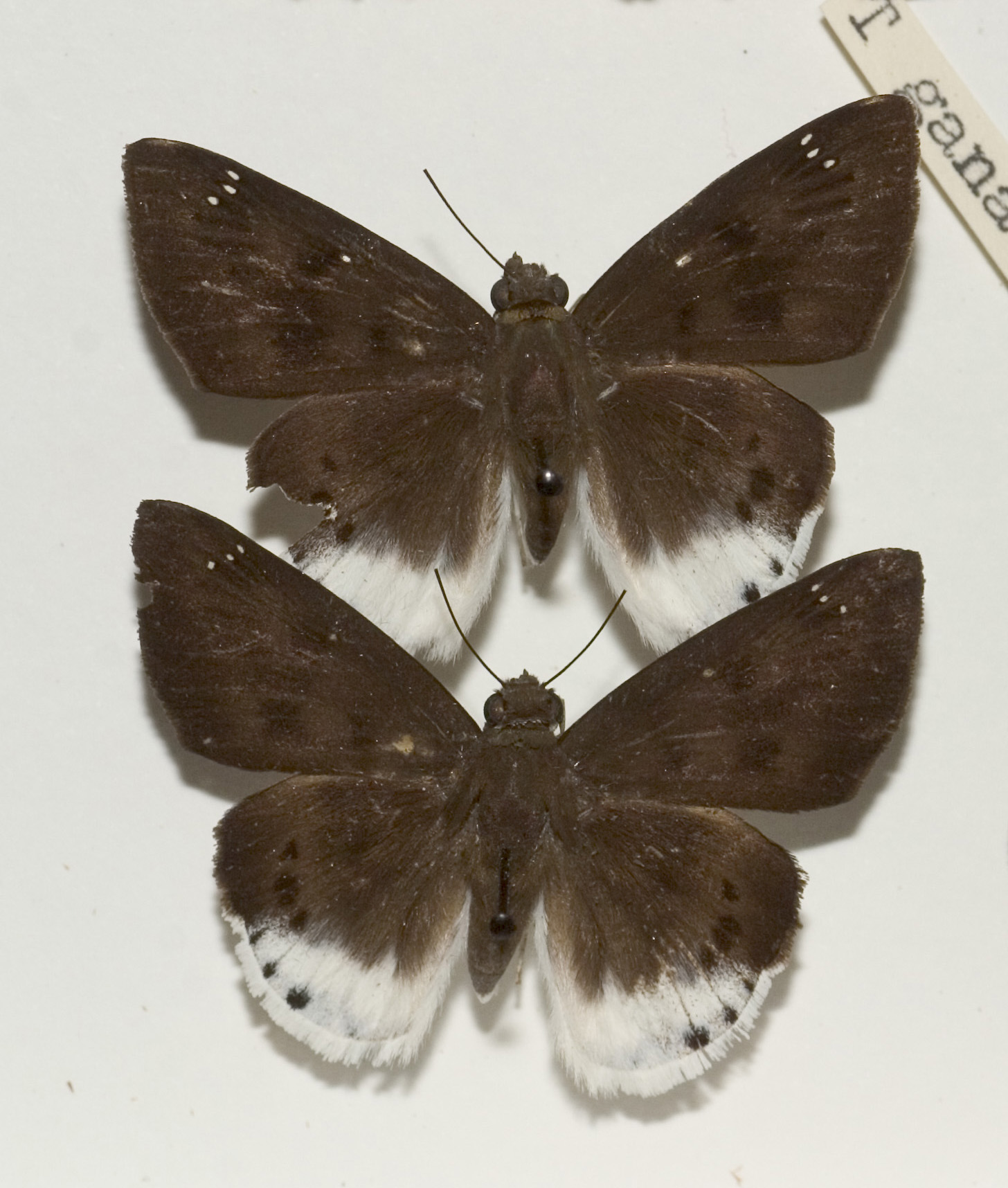
Museum specimen

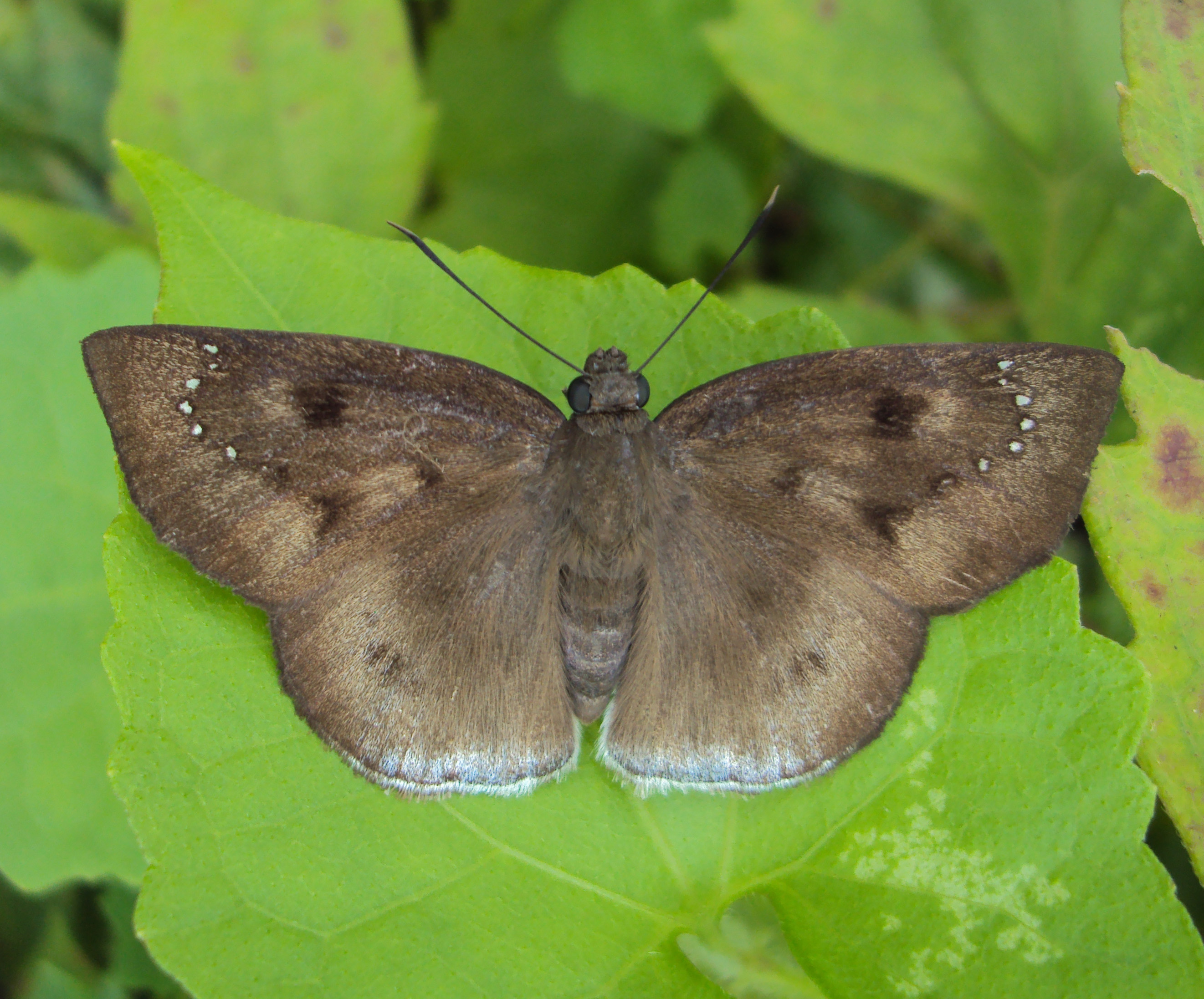
Dorsal view

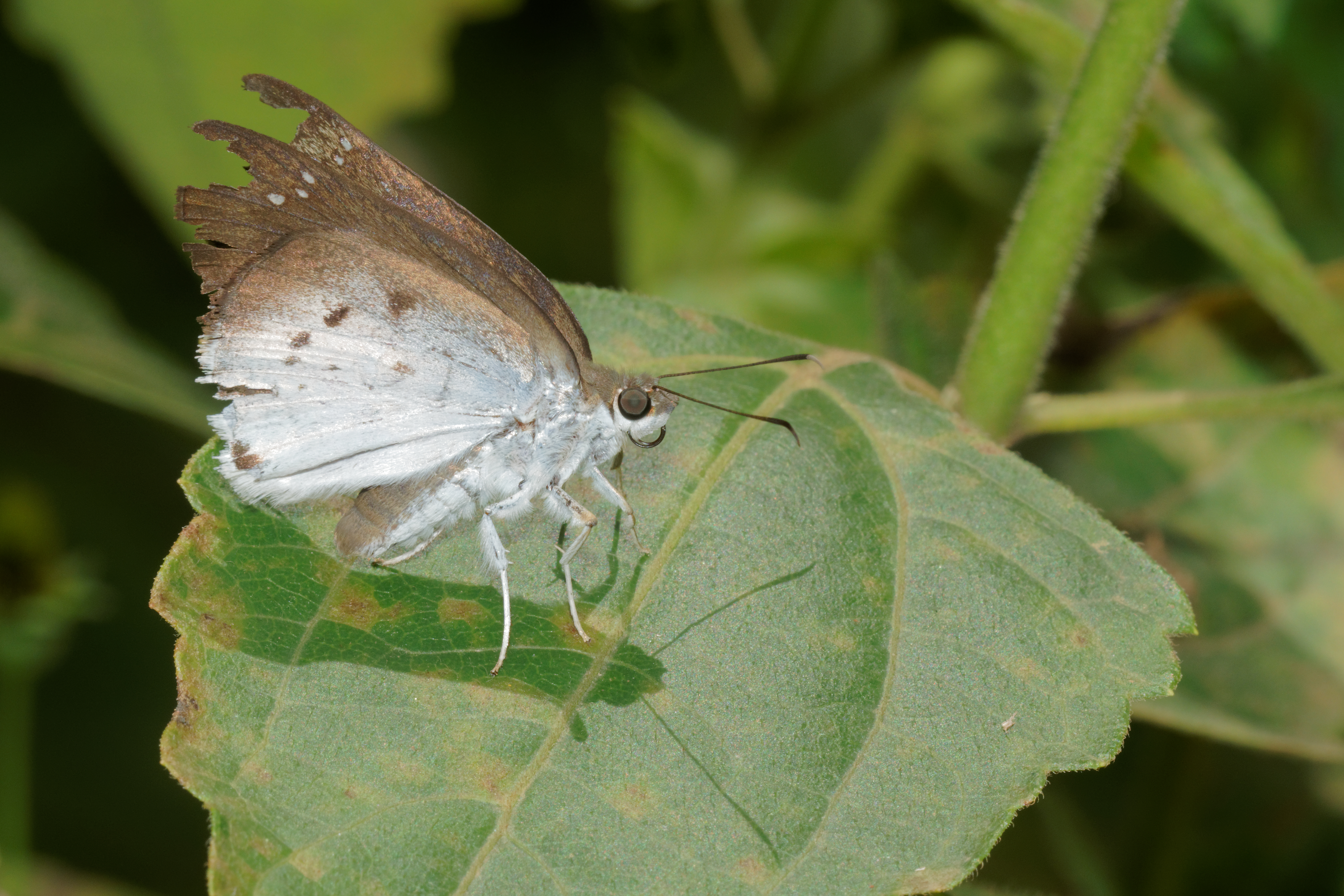
Ventral view

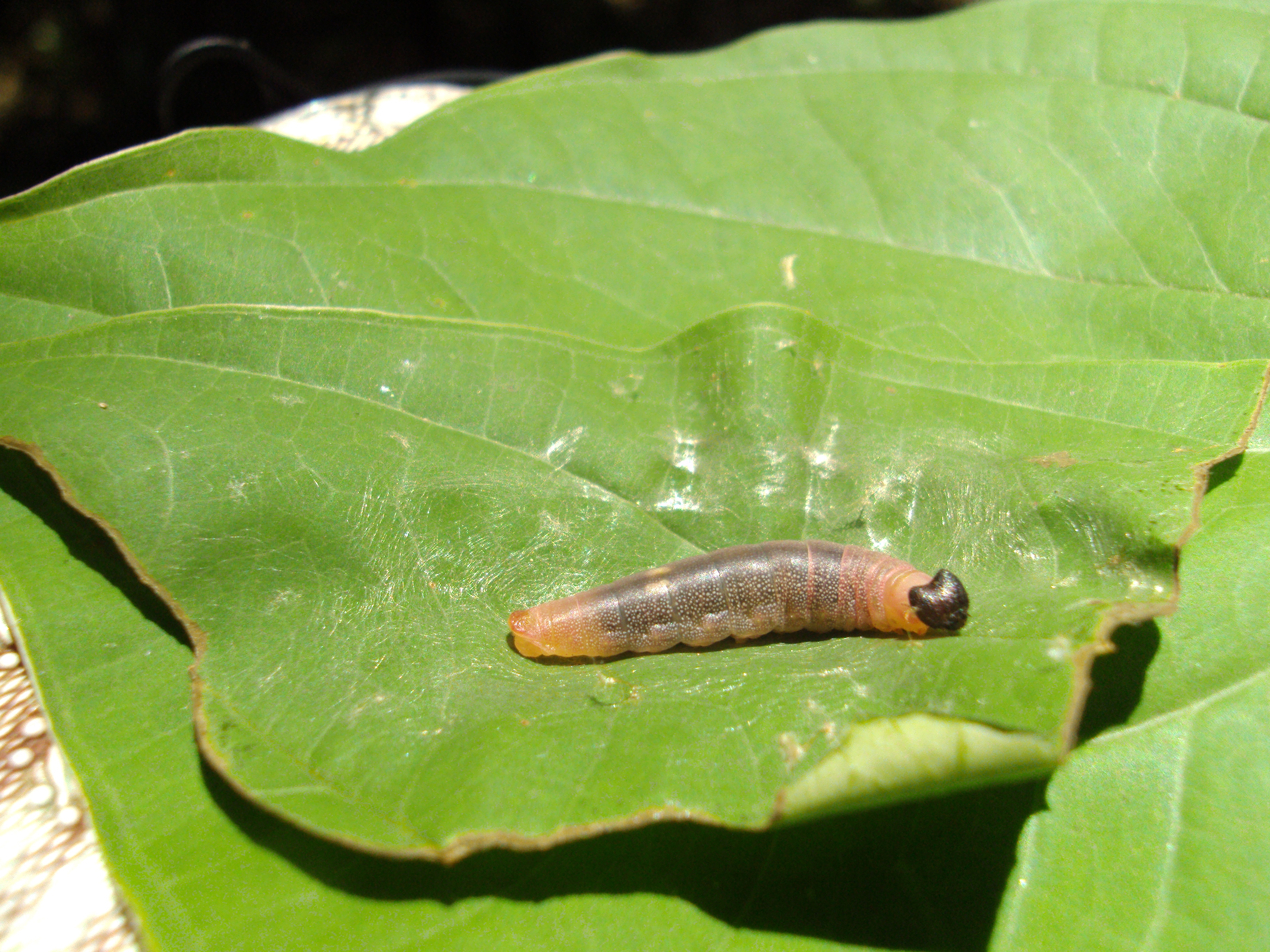
Larva

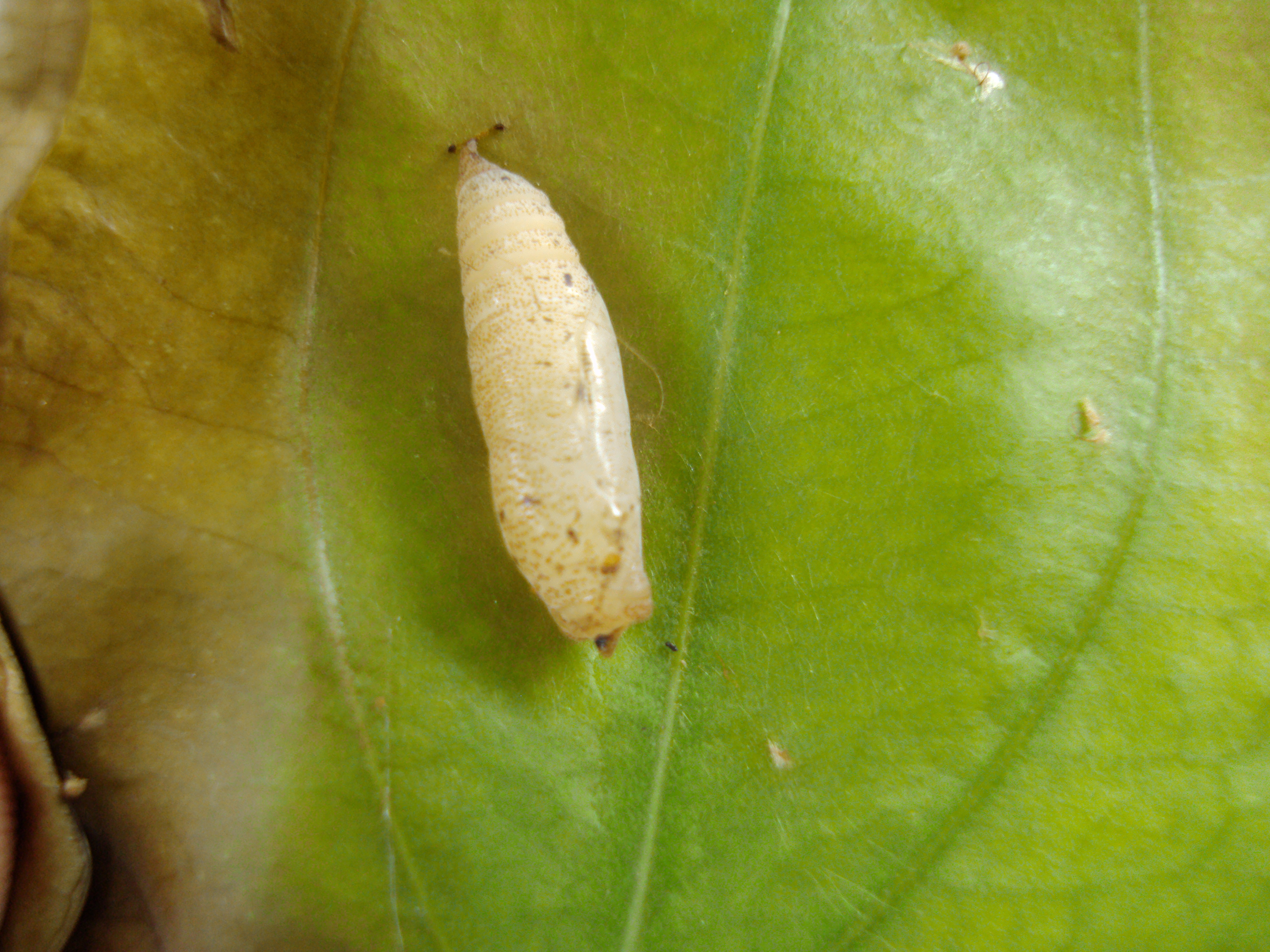
Pupa

===== Tagiades japetus (common snow flat) =====
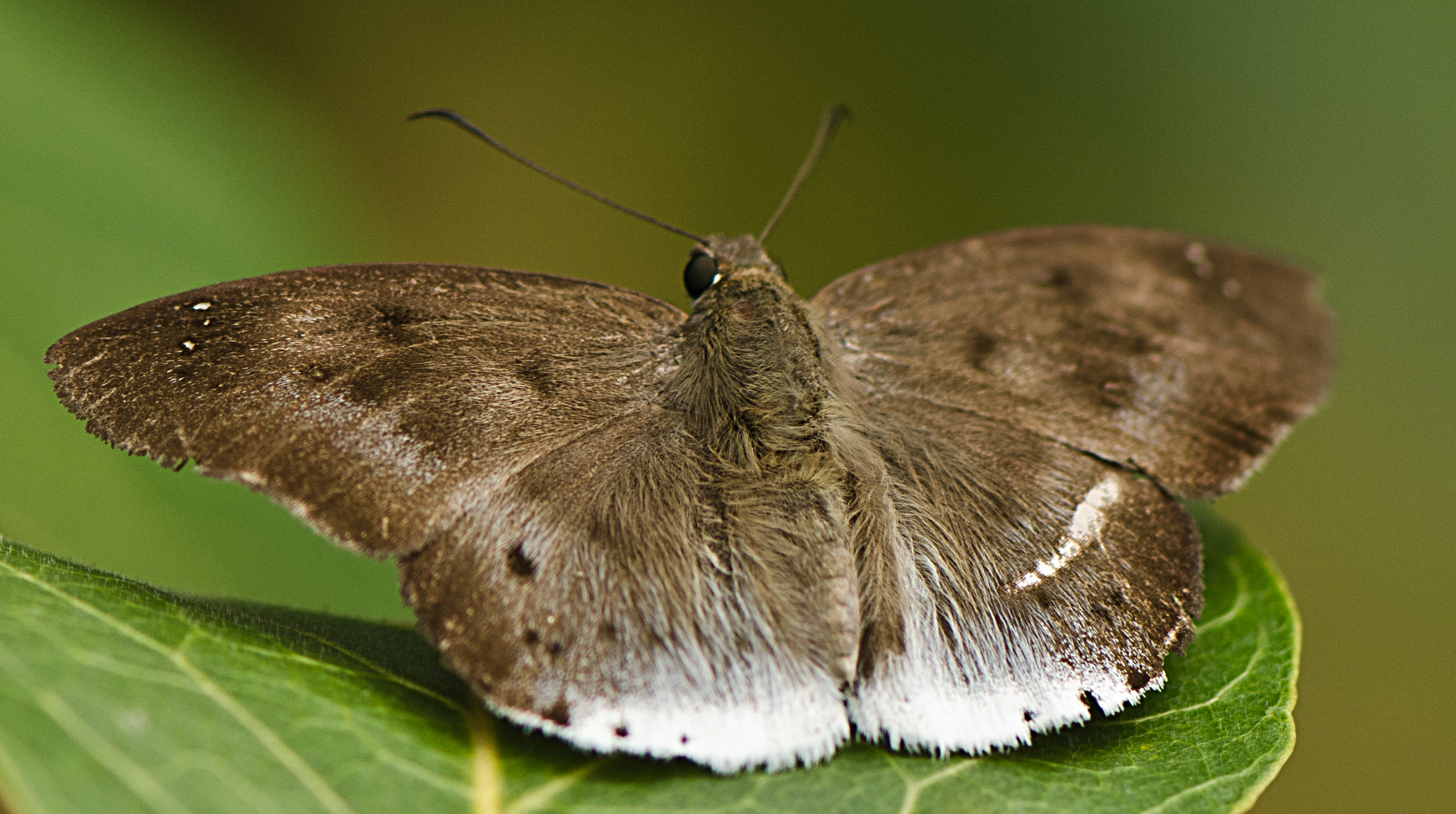
Dorsal view

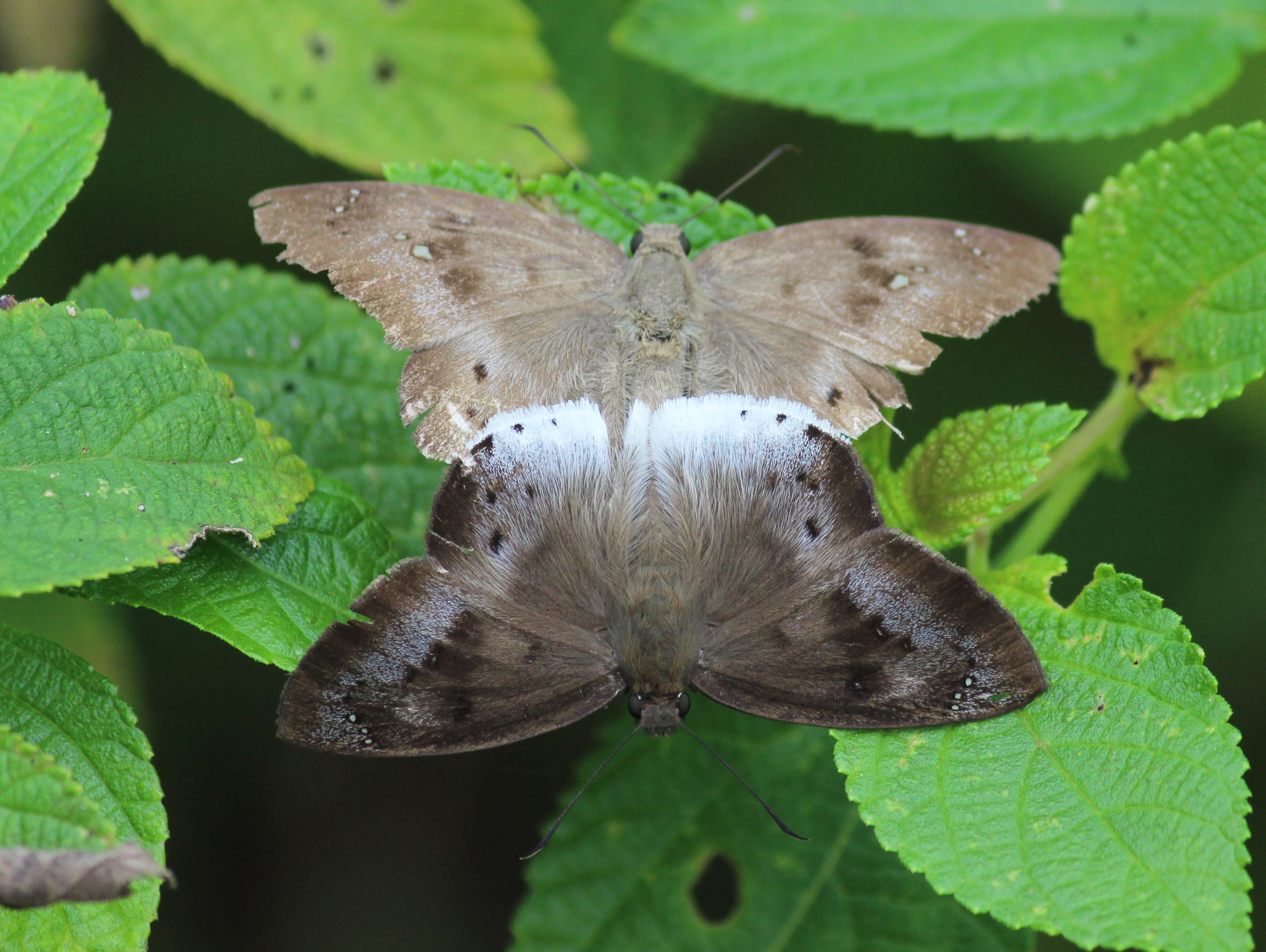
Mating pair

===== Tagiades litigiosa (water snow flat) =====
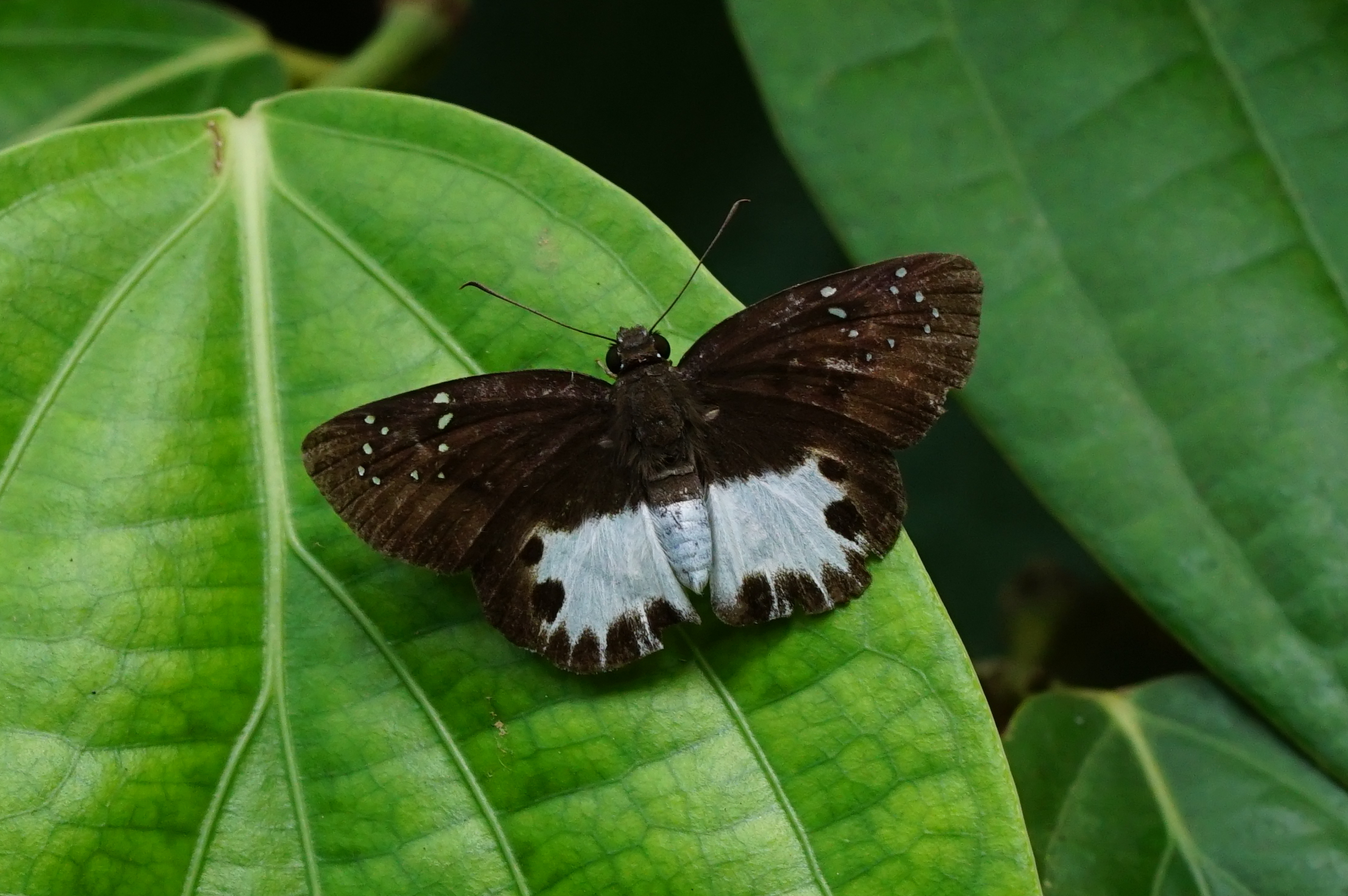
Dorsal view

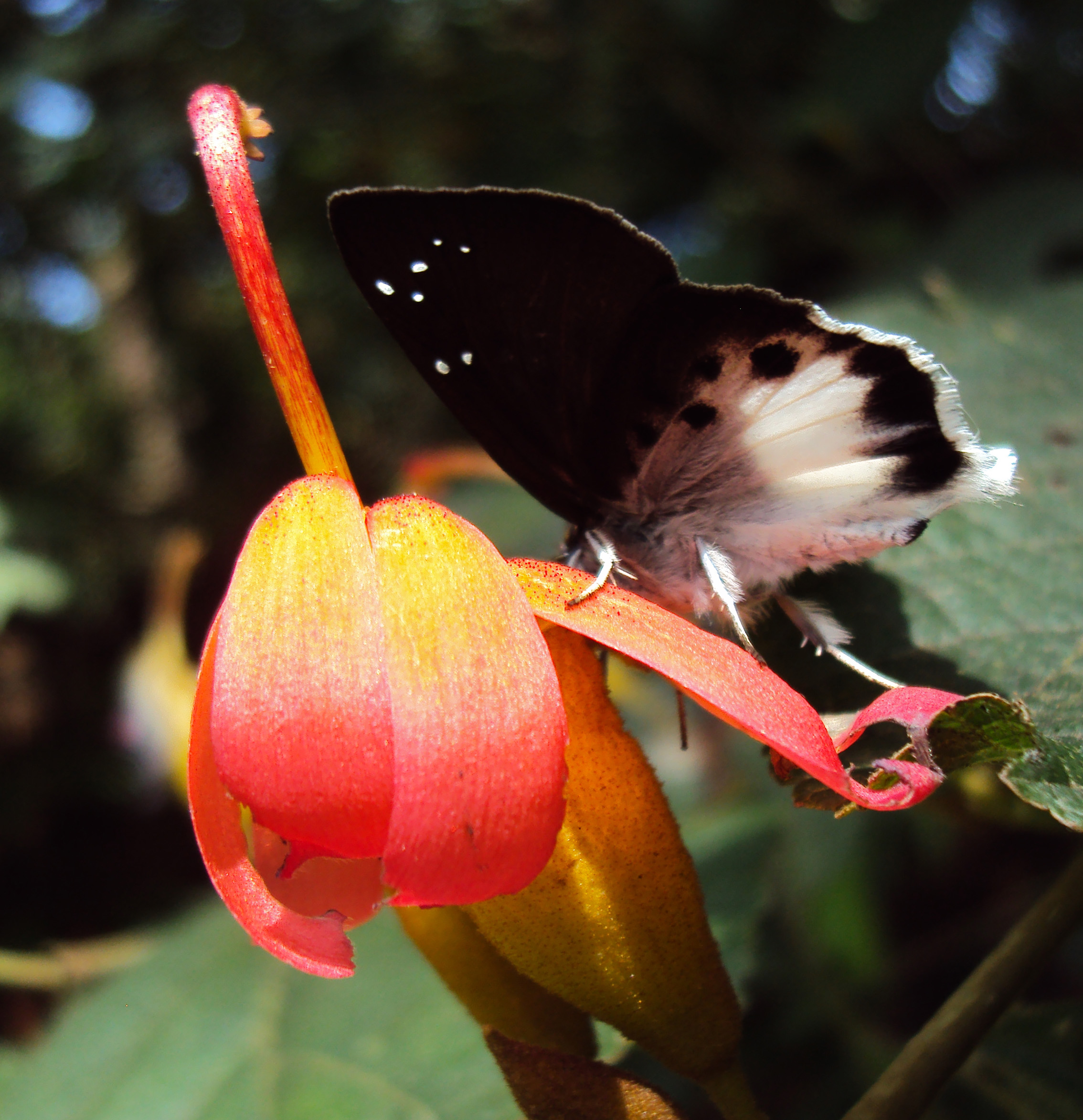
Ventral view

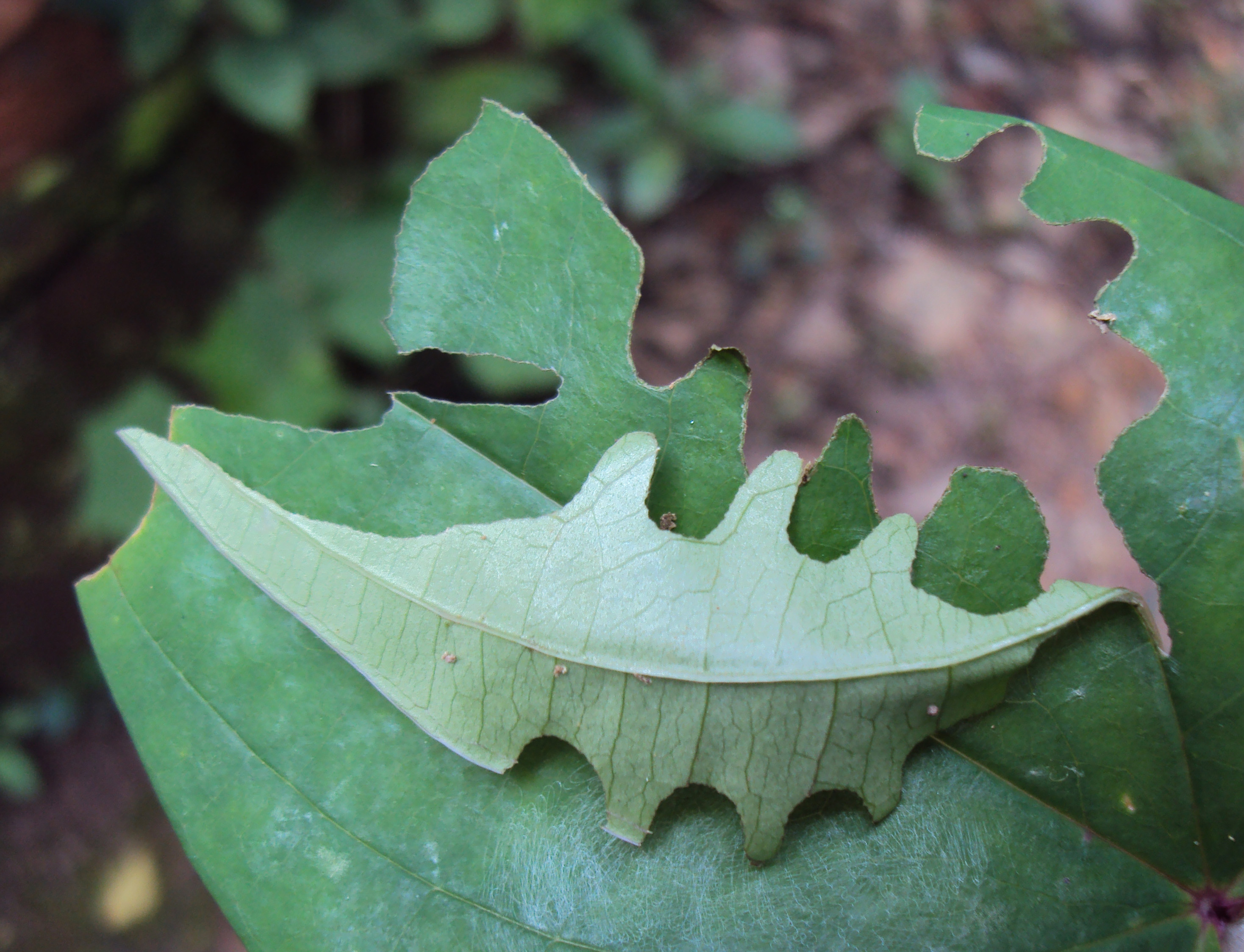
Larva case

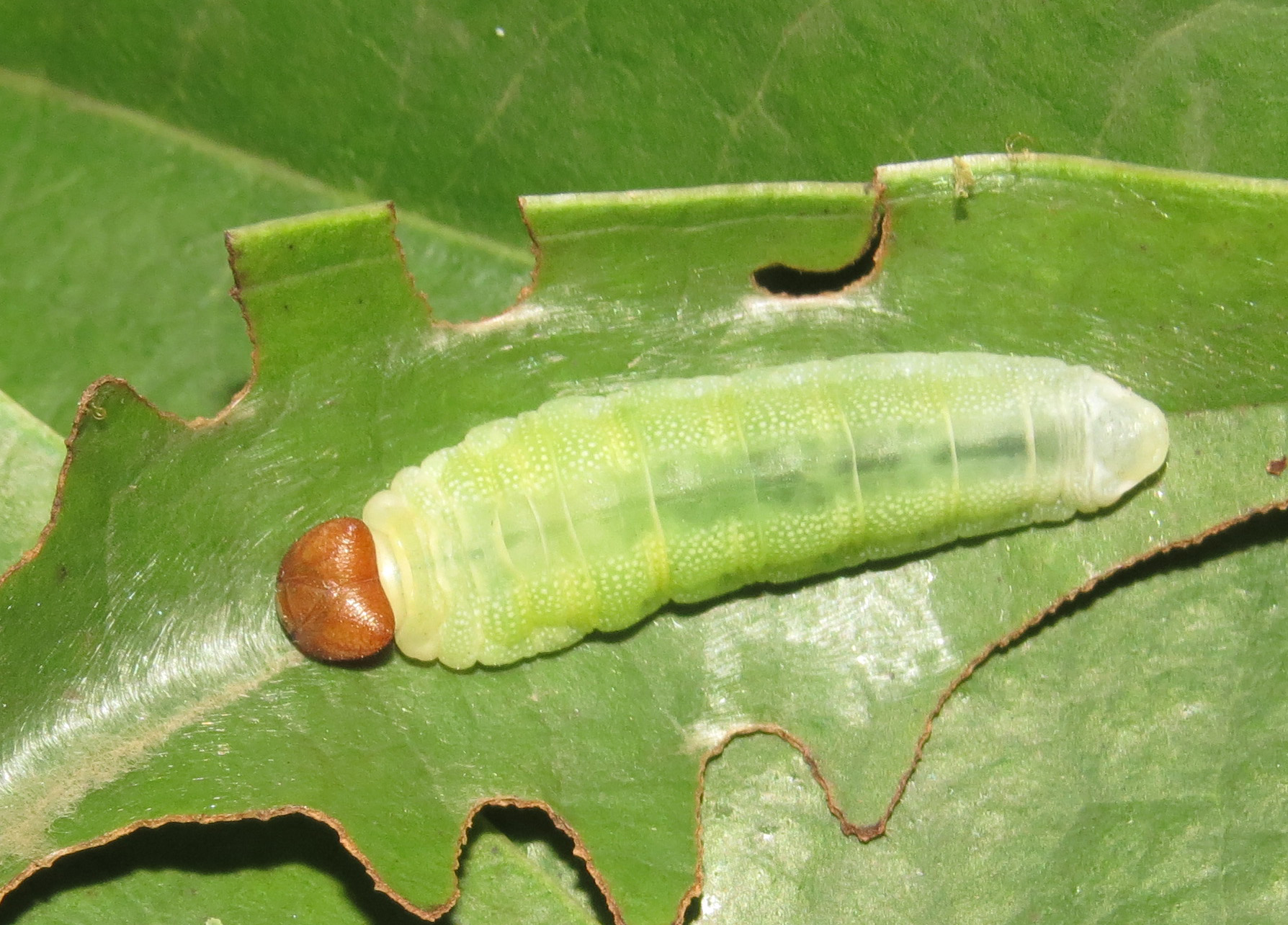
Larva

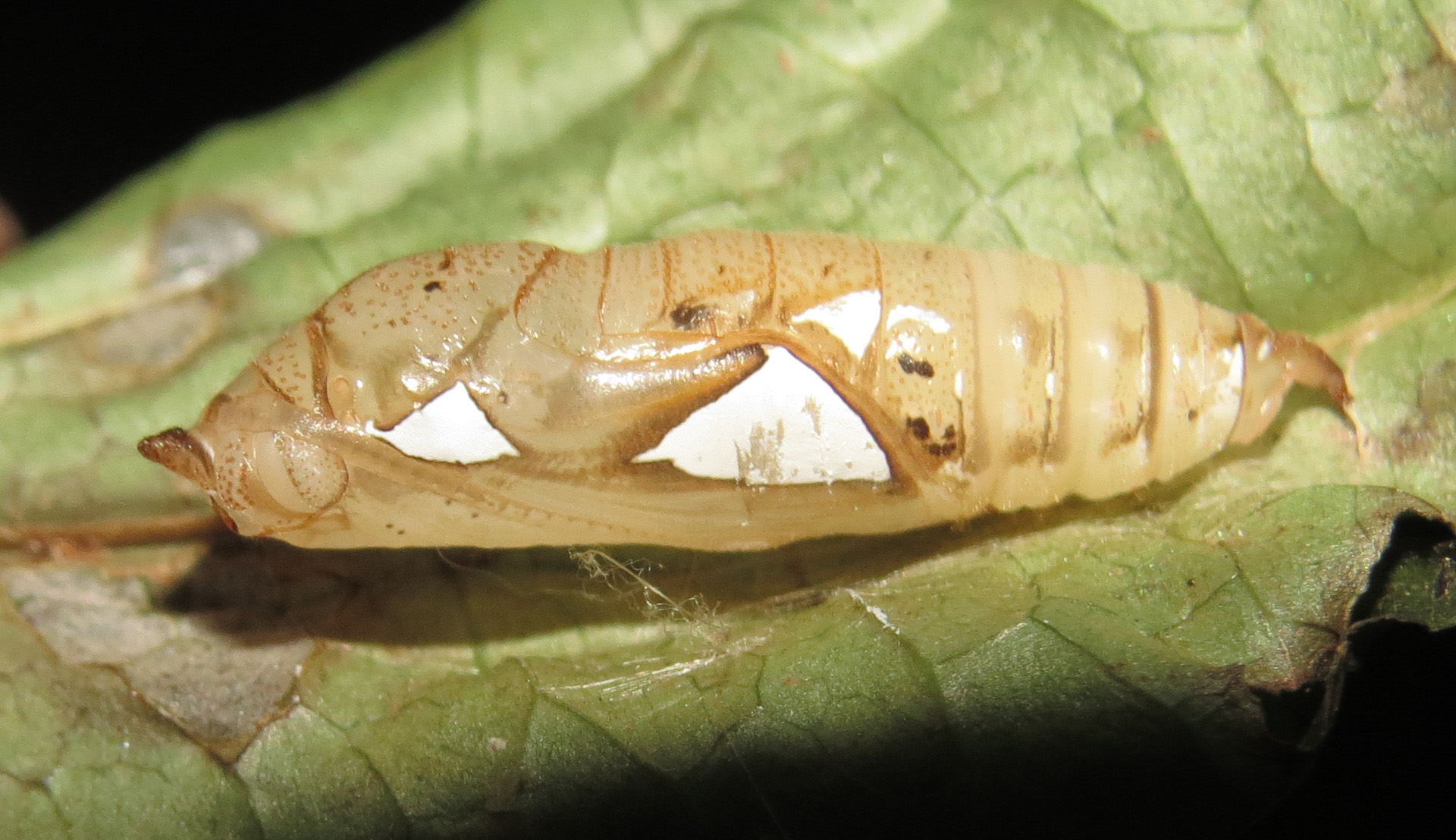
Pupa

==== Genus: Tapena ====
===== Tapena thwaitesi (black angle) =====
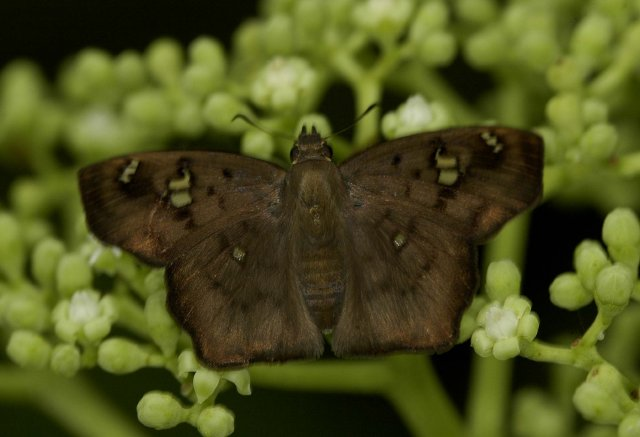
Dorsal view (wet-season form)

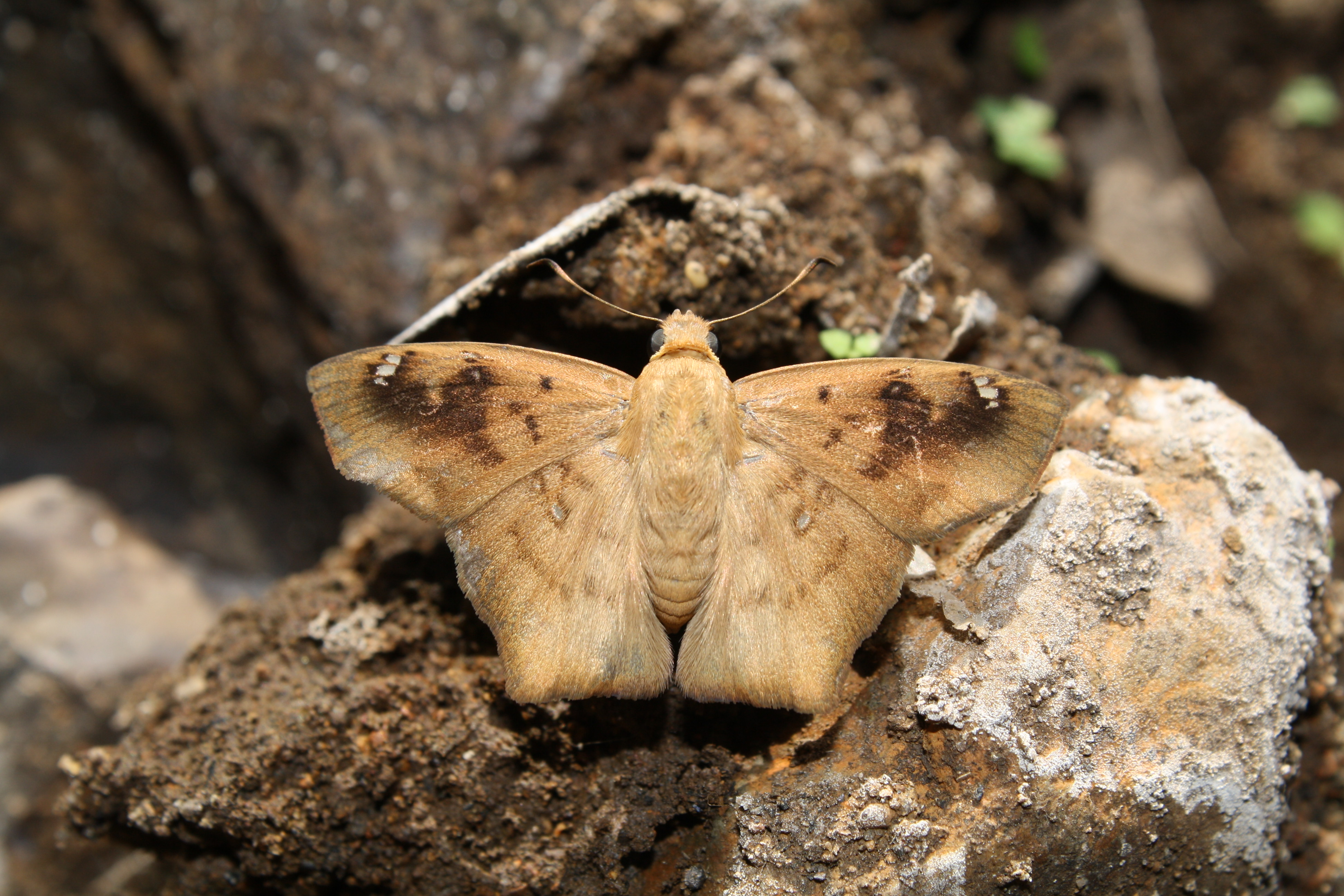
Dorsal view (dry-season form)

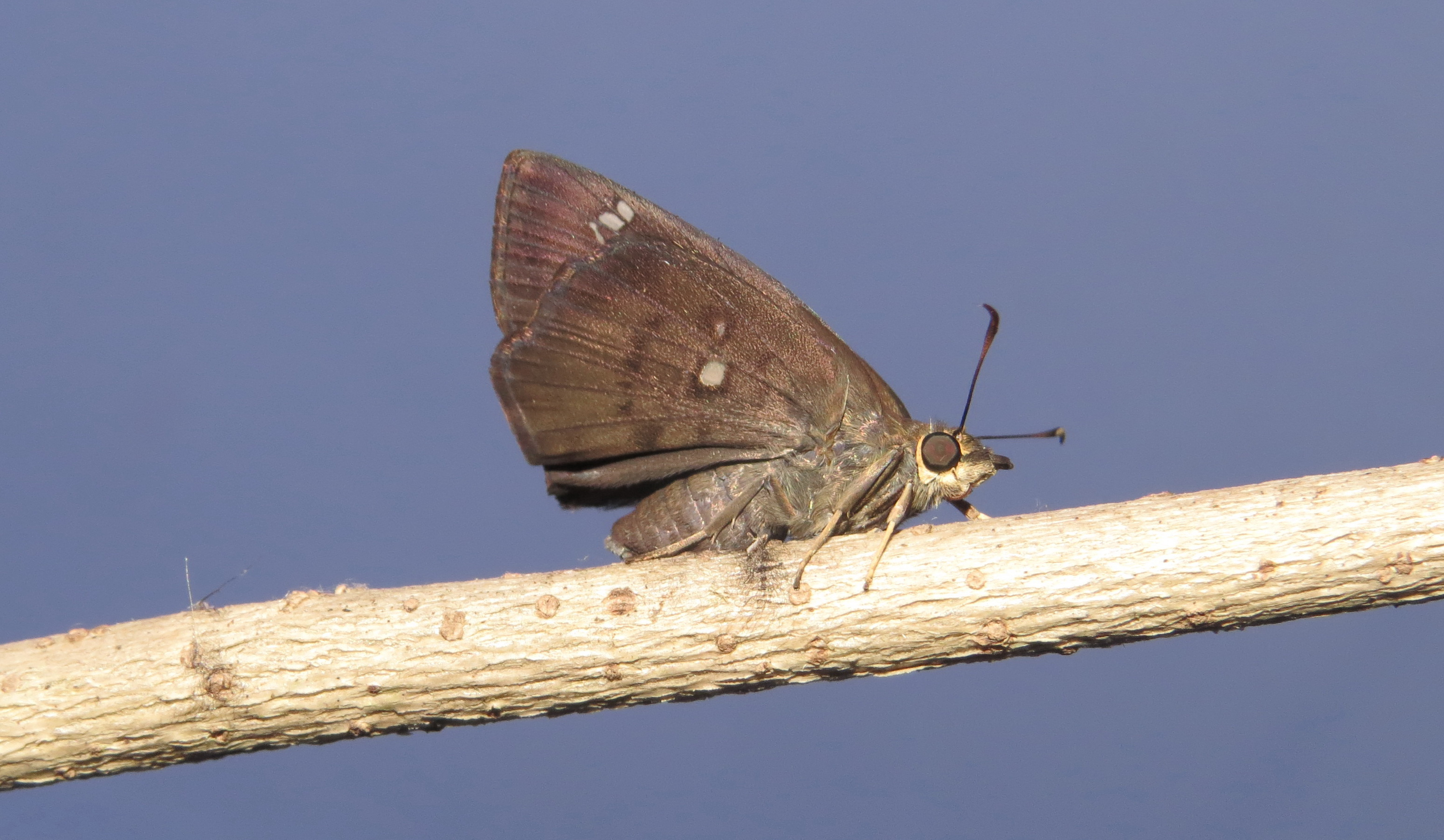
Ventral view

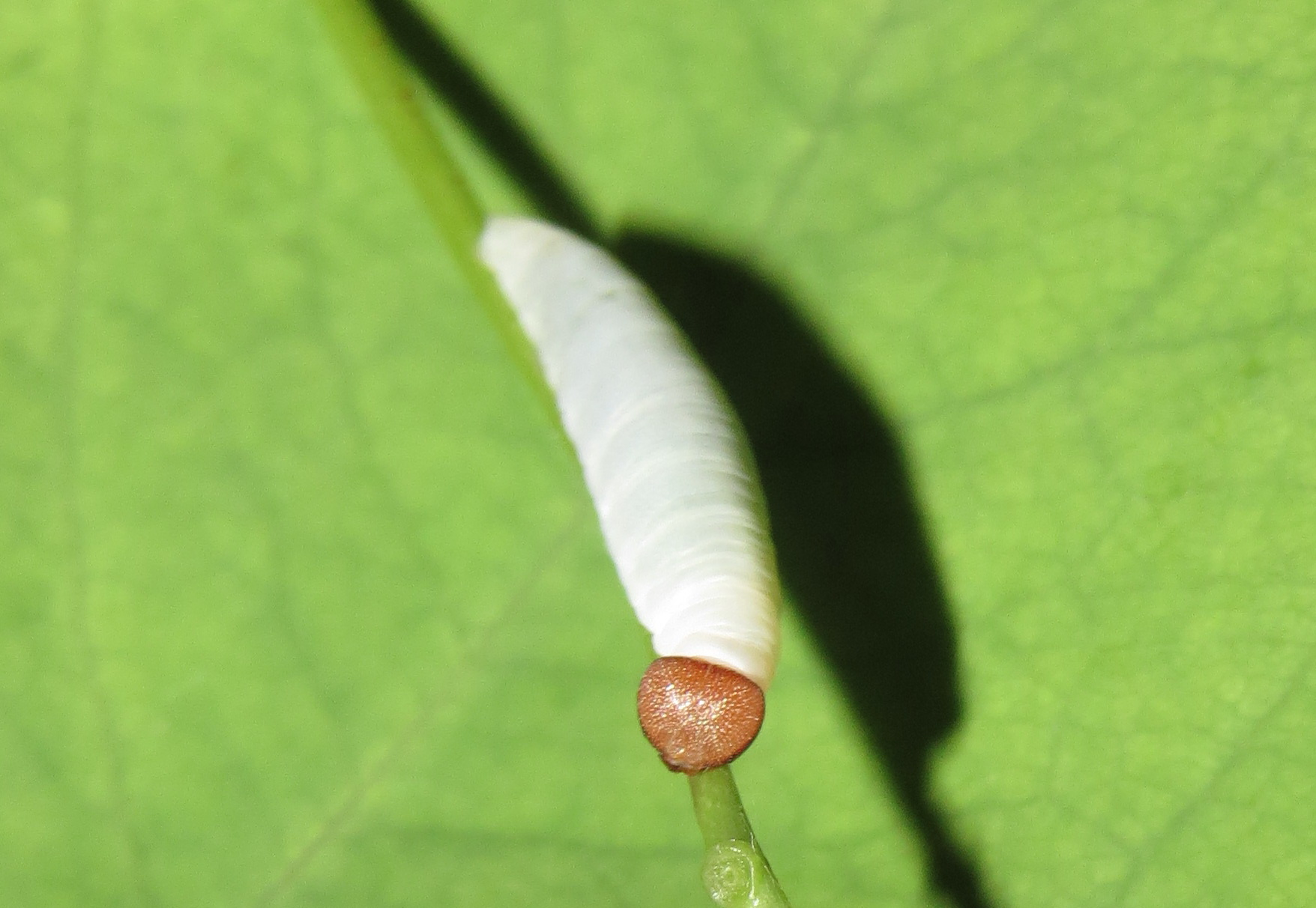
Larva

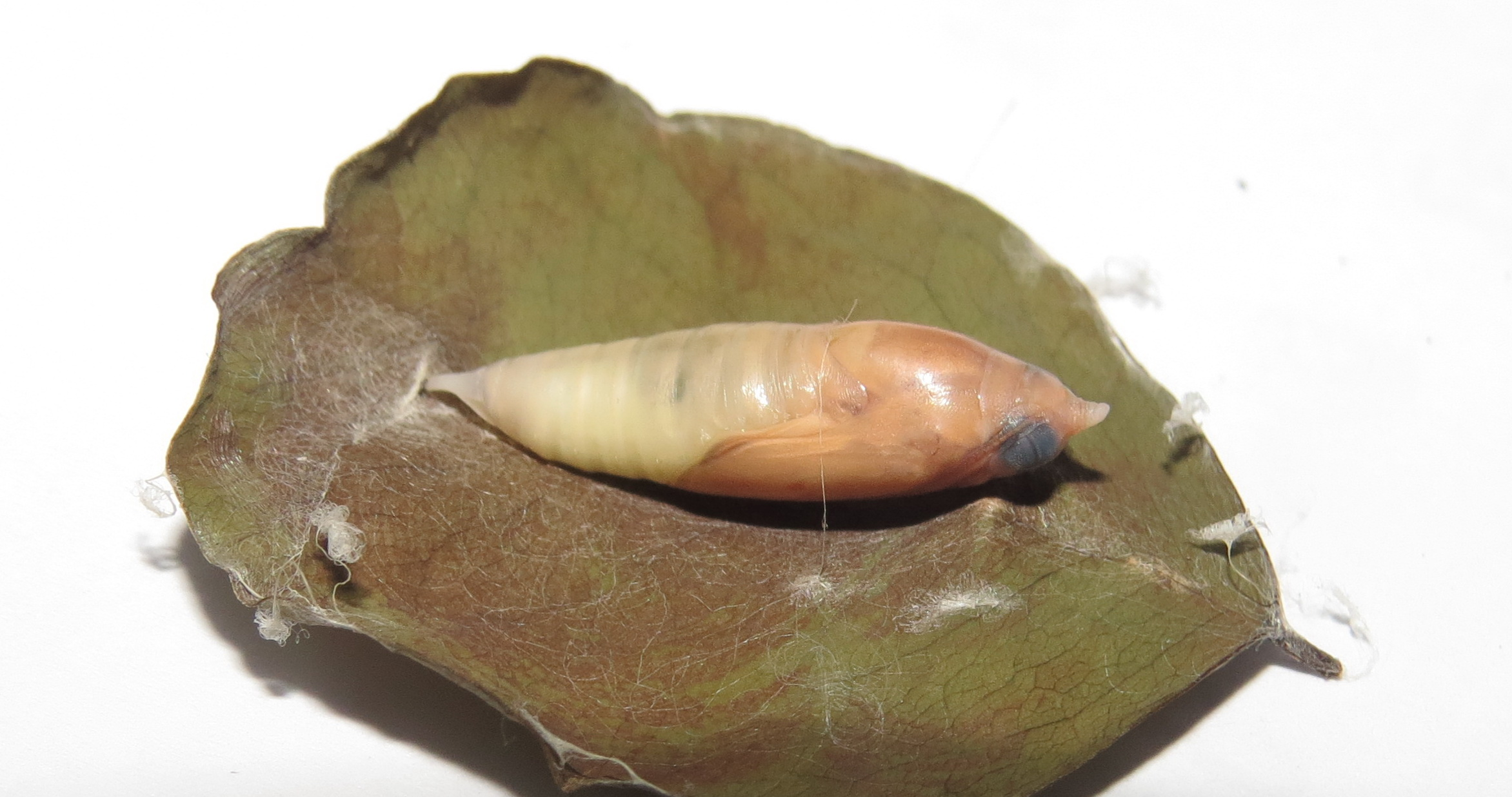
Pupa

== See also ==
- Butterfly
- List of butterflies of India
- List of butterflies of the Western Ghats
- Fauna of India
