= List of butterflies of West Bengal =

This is a list of butterfly species and subspecies found in West Bengal, India.

== Family: Papilionidae ==
=== Subfamily: Papilioninae ===
Tribe: Leptocircini

==== Genus: Graphium (swordtails, bluebottles and jays) ====
===== Species: Graphium agamemnon (tailed jay) =====
Subspecies: Graphium agamemnon agamemnon (Oriental tailed jay)

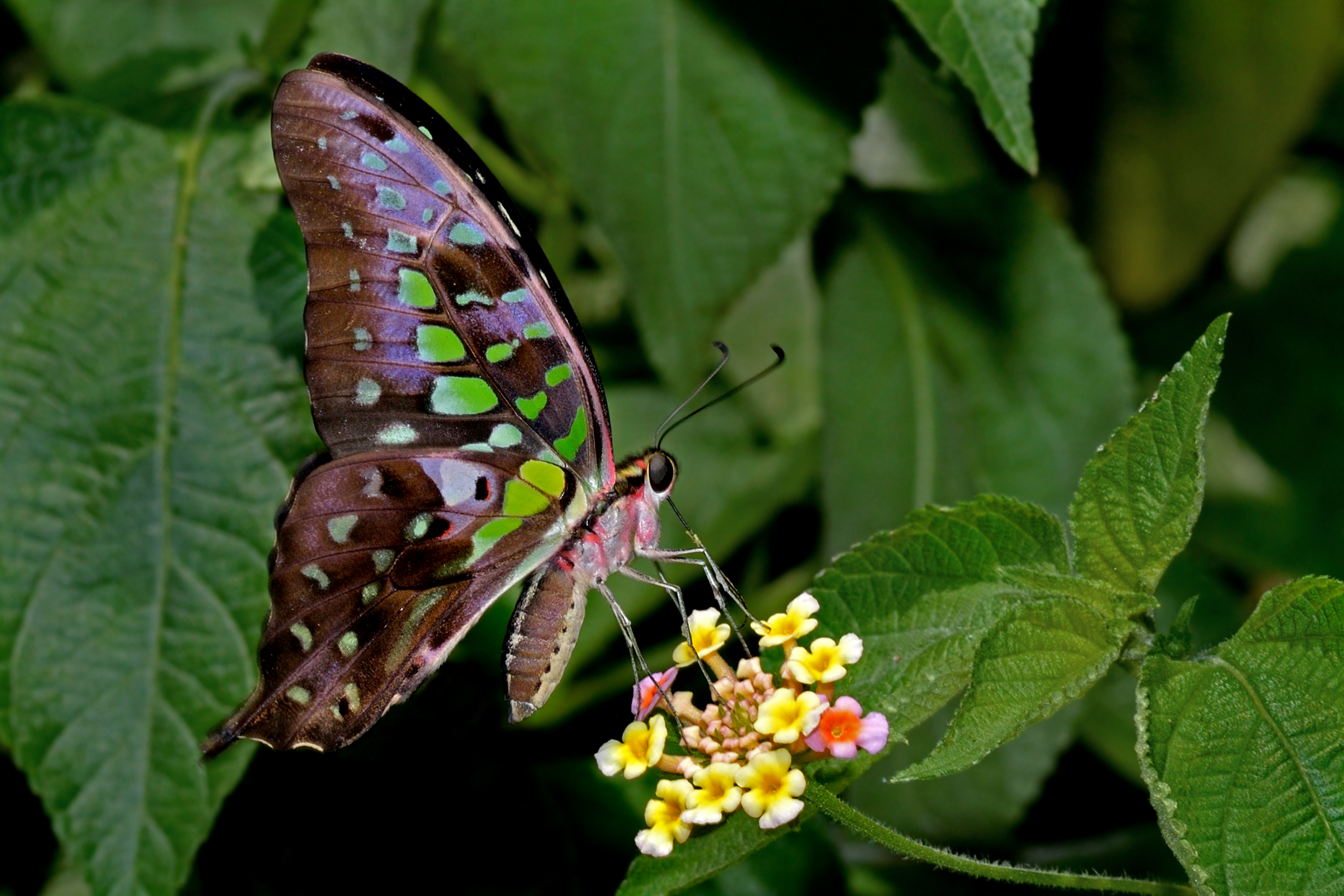
Ventral view

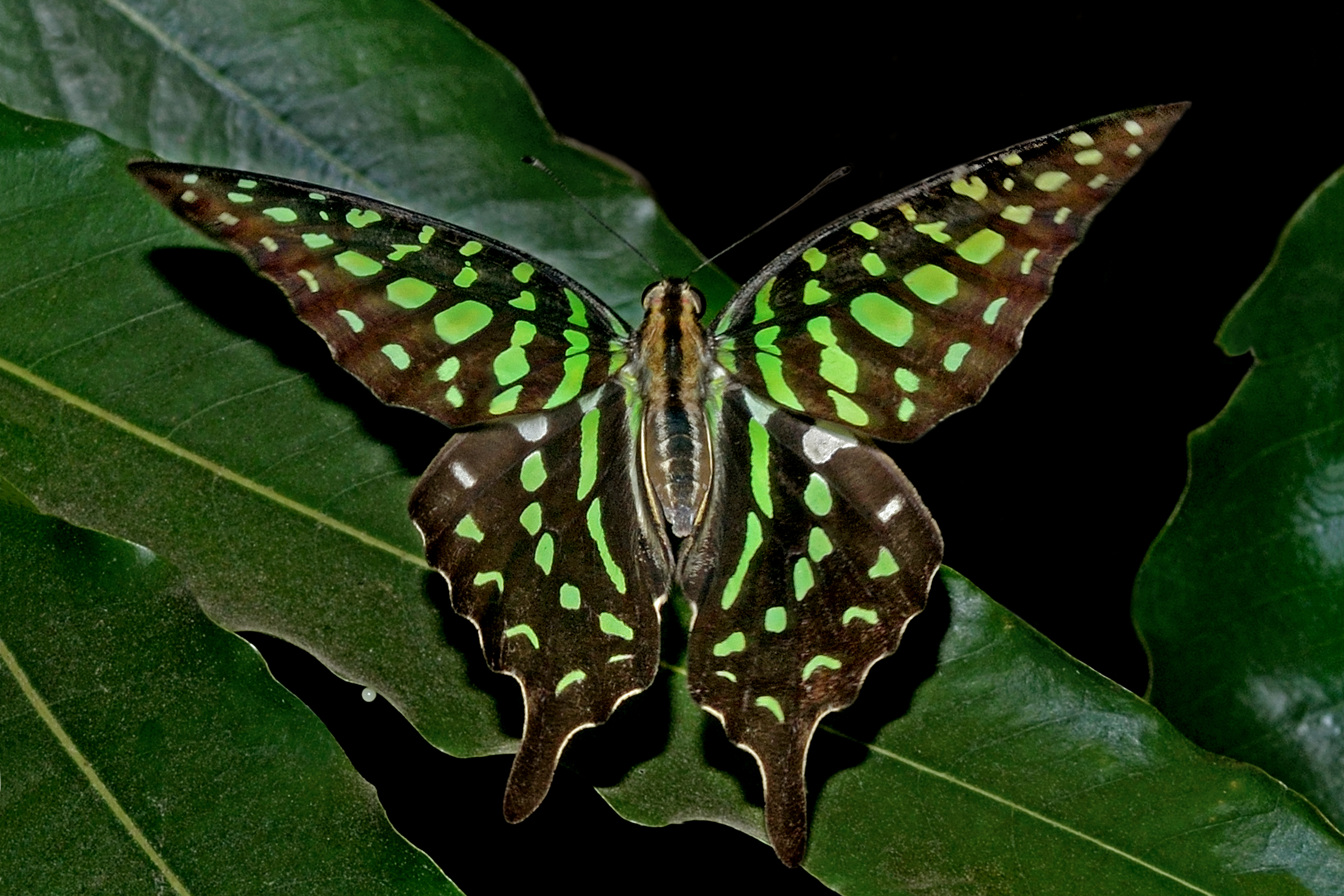
Dorsal view

===== Species: Graphium agetes (four-bar swordtail) =====
Subspecies: Graphium agetes agetes (Assam four-bar swordtail)

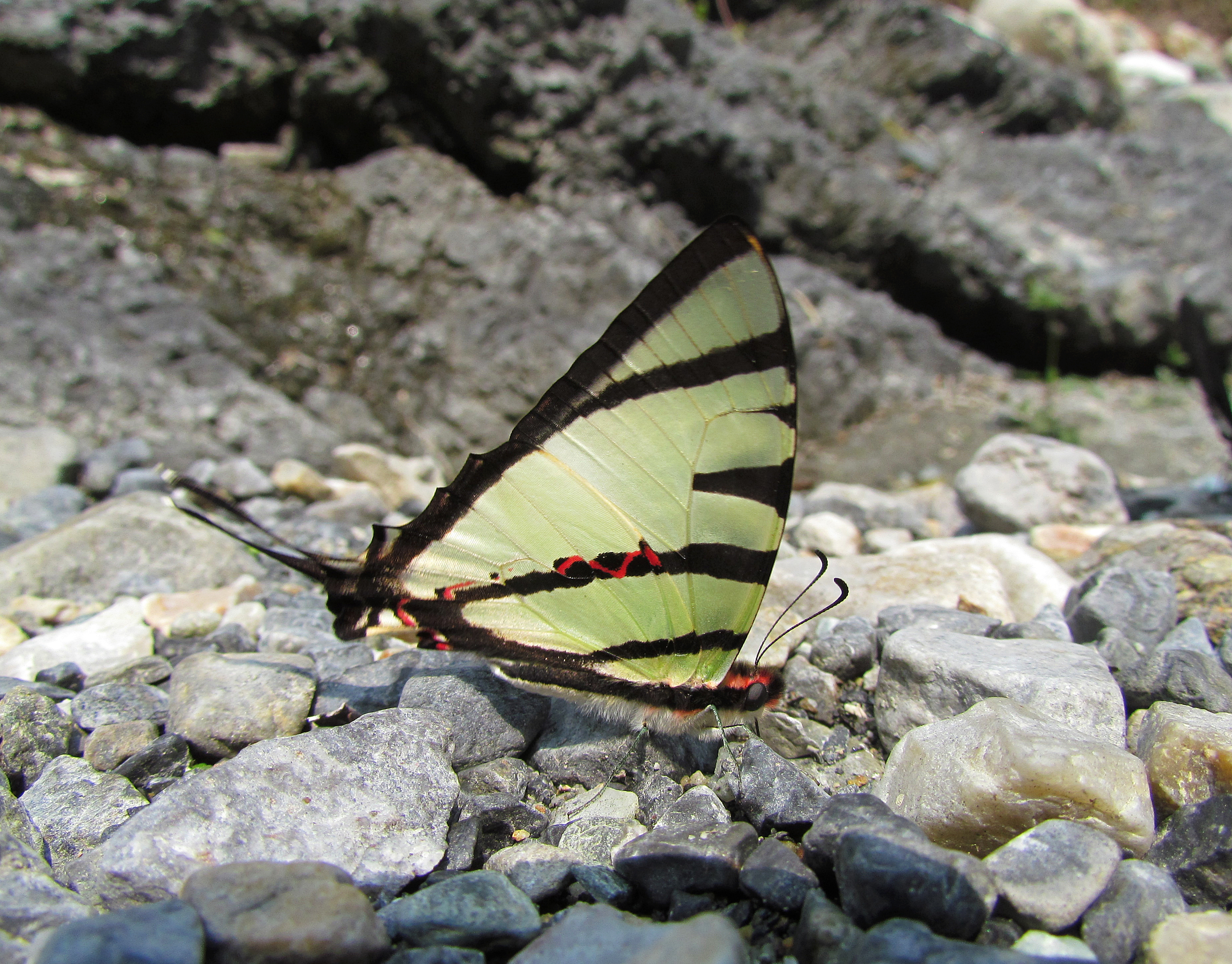
Ventral view (male)

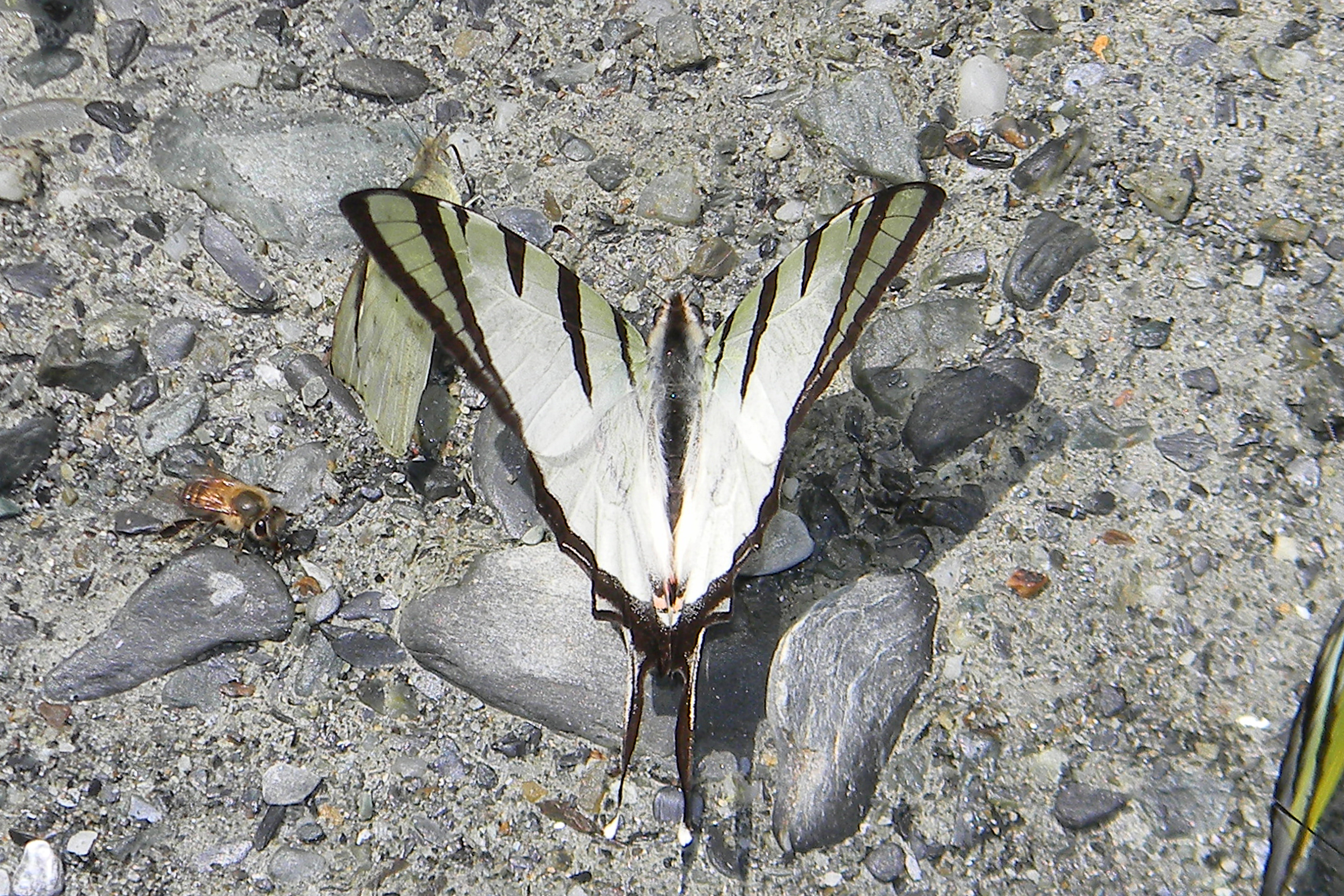
Dorsal view (male)

===== Species: Graphium antiphates (five-bar swordtail) =====
Subspecies: Graphium antiphates pompilius (Indo-Chinese five-bar swordtail)

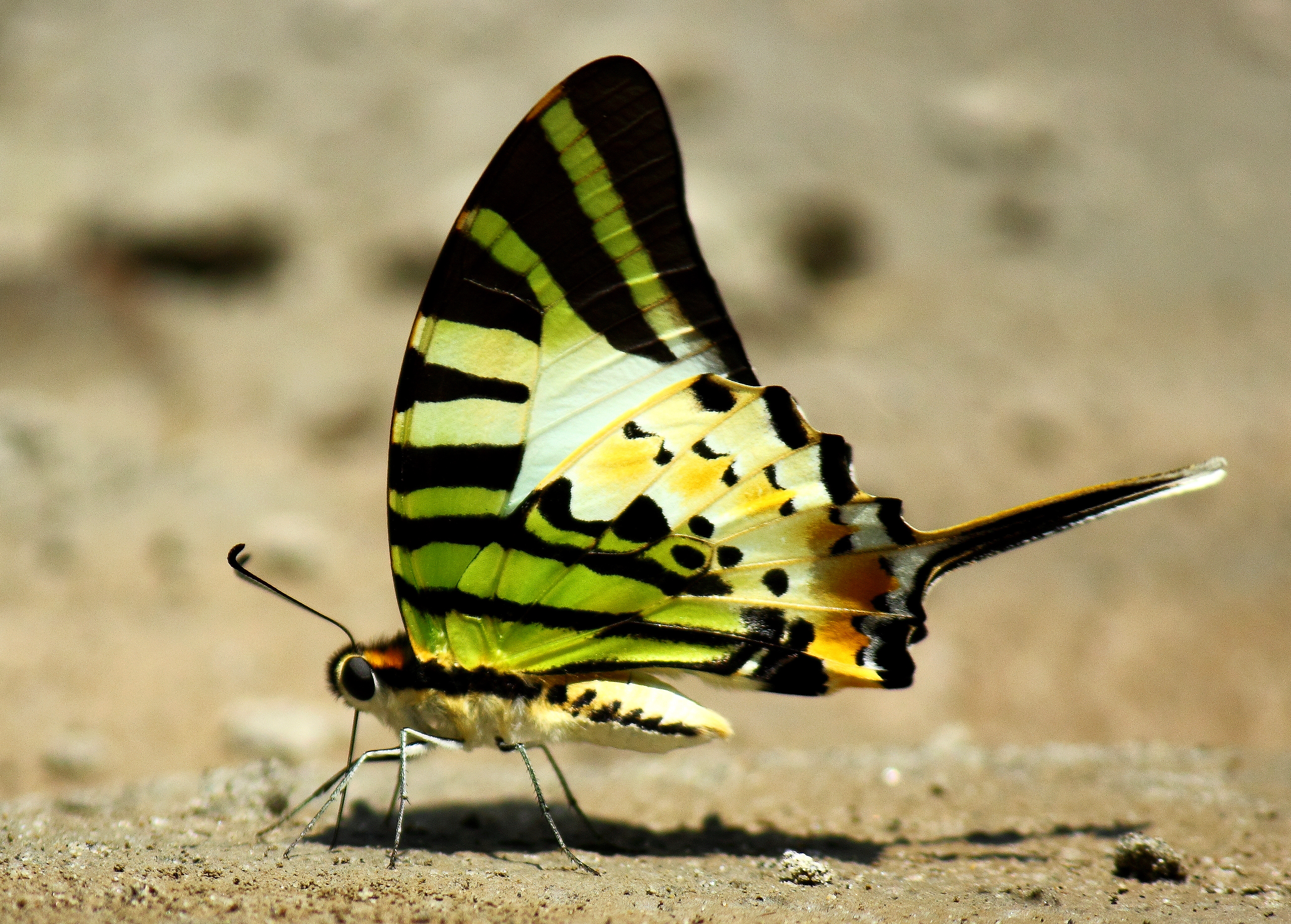
Ventral view

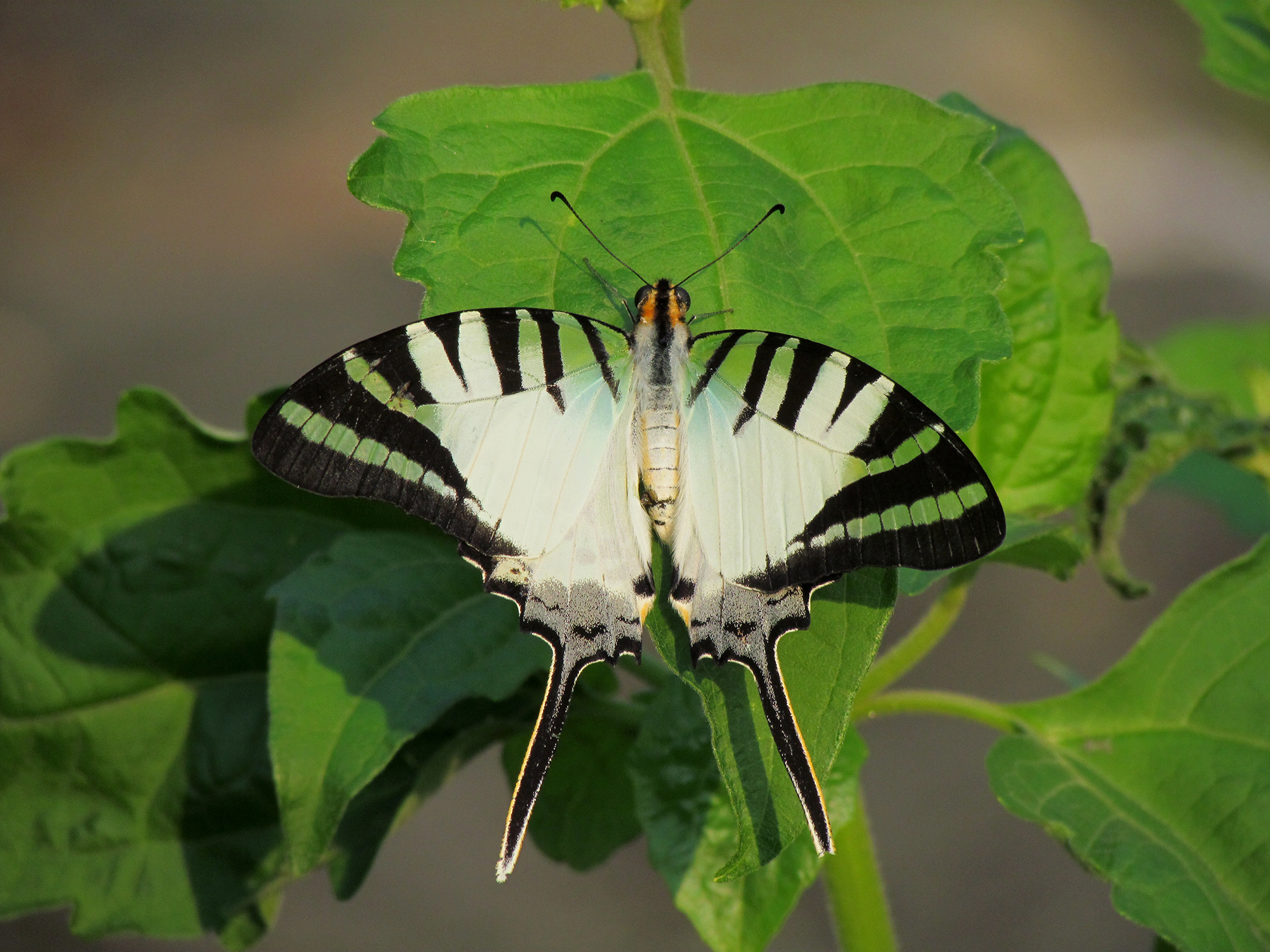
Dorsal view

===== Species: Graphium aristeus (chain swordtail) =====
Subspecies: Graphium aristeus anticrates (Assam chain swordtail)

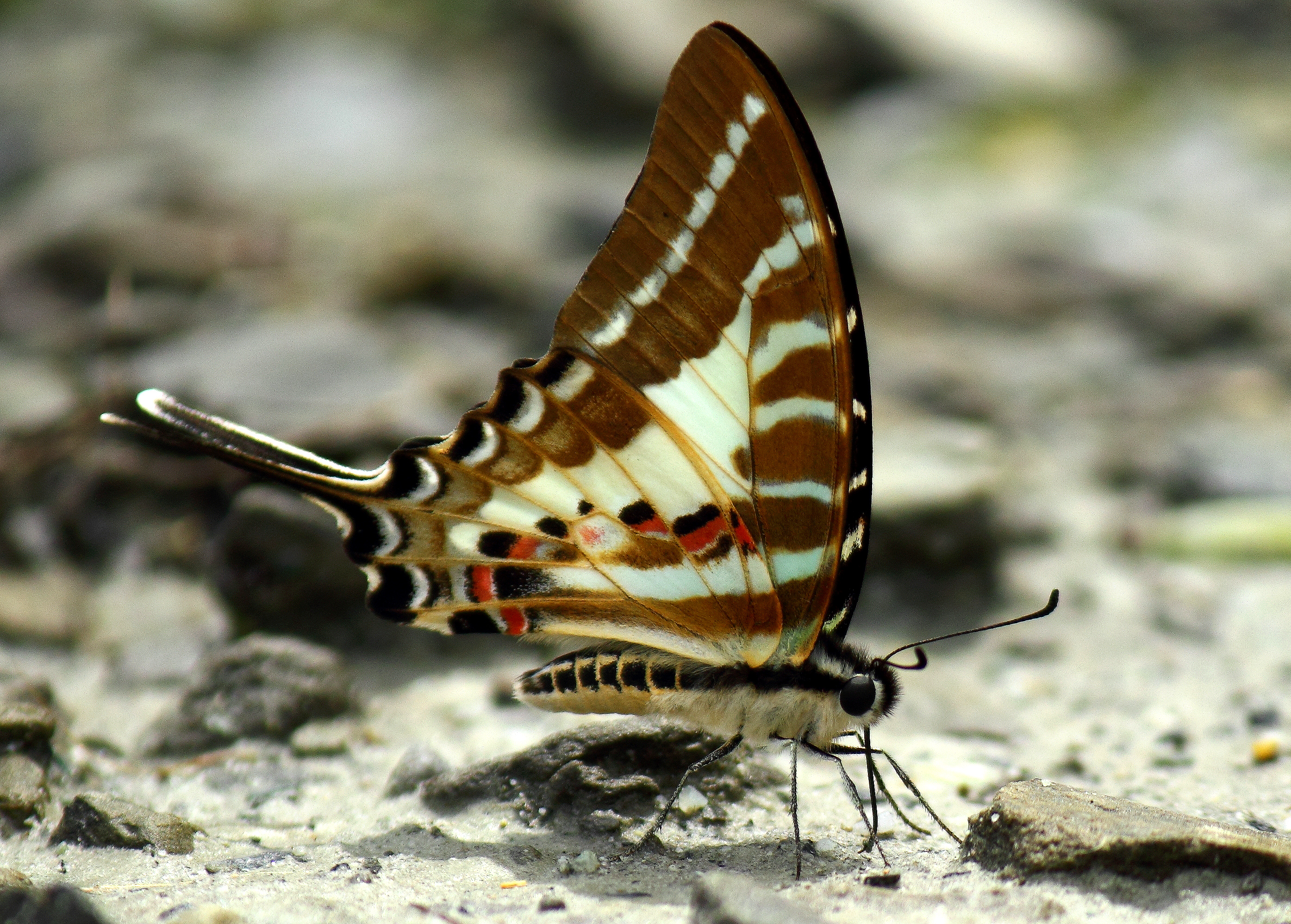
Ventral view

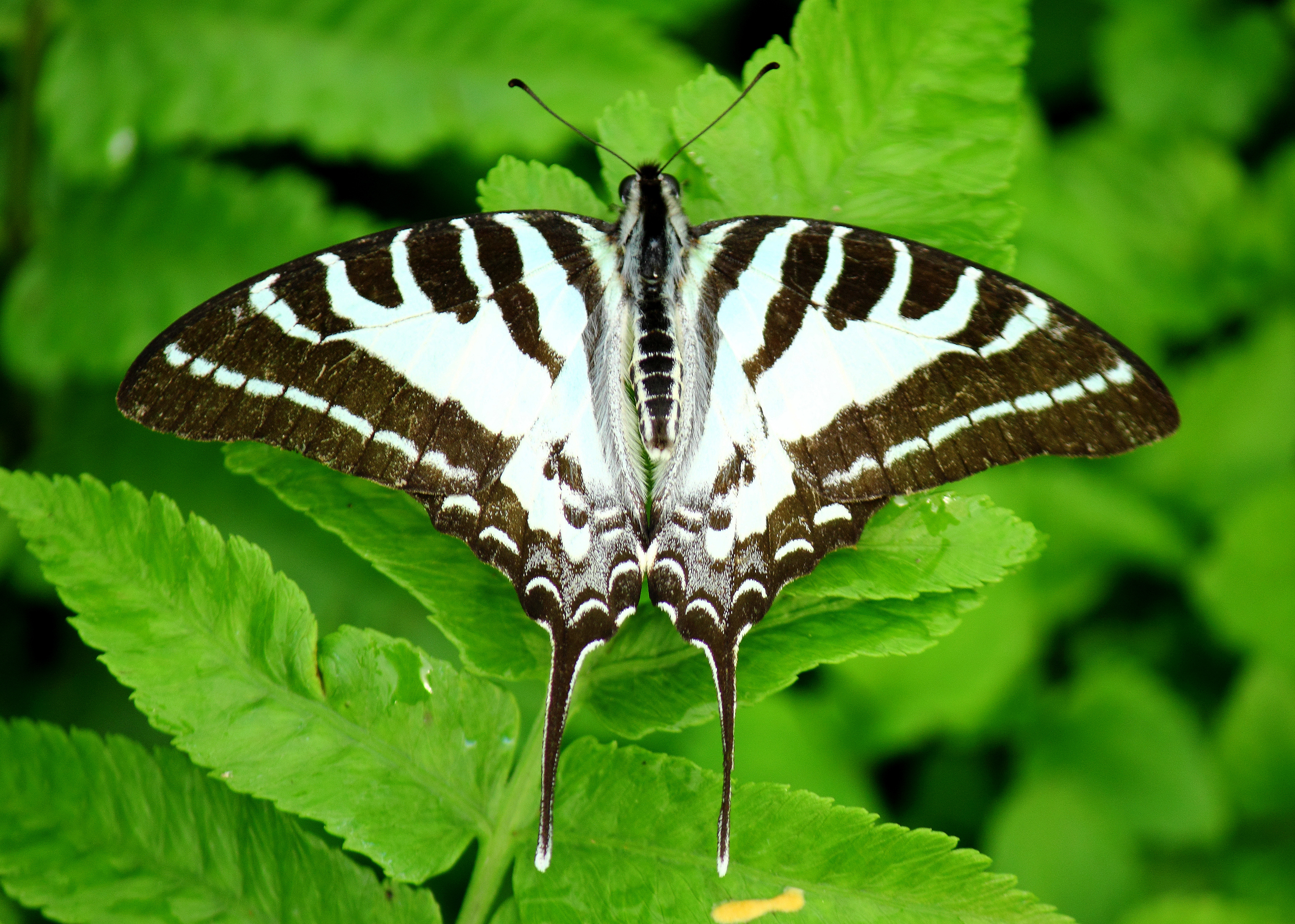
Dorsal view

===== Species: Graphium cloanthus (glassy bluebottle) =====
Subspecies: Graphium cloanthus cloanthus (Himalayan glassy bluebottle)

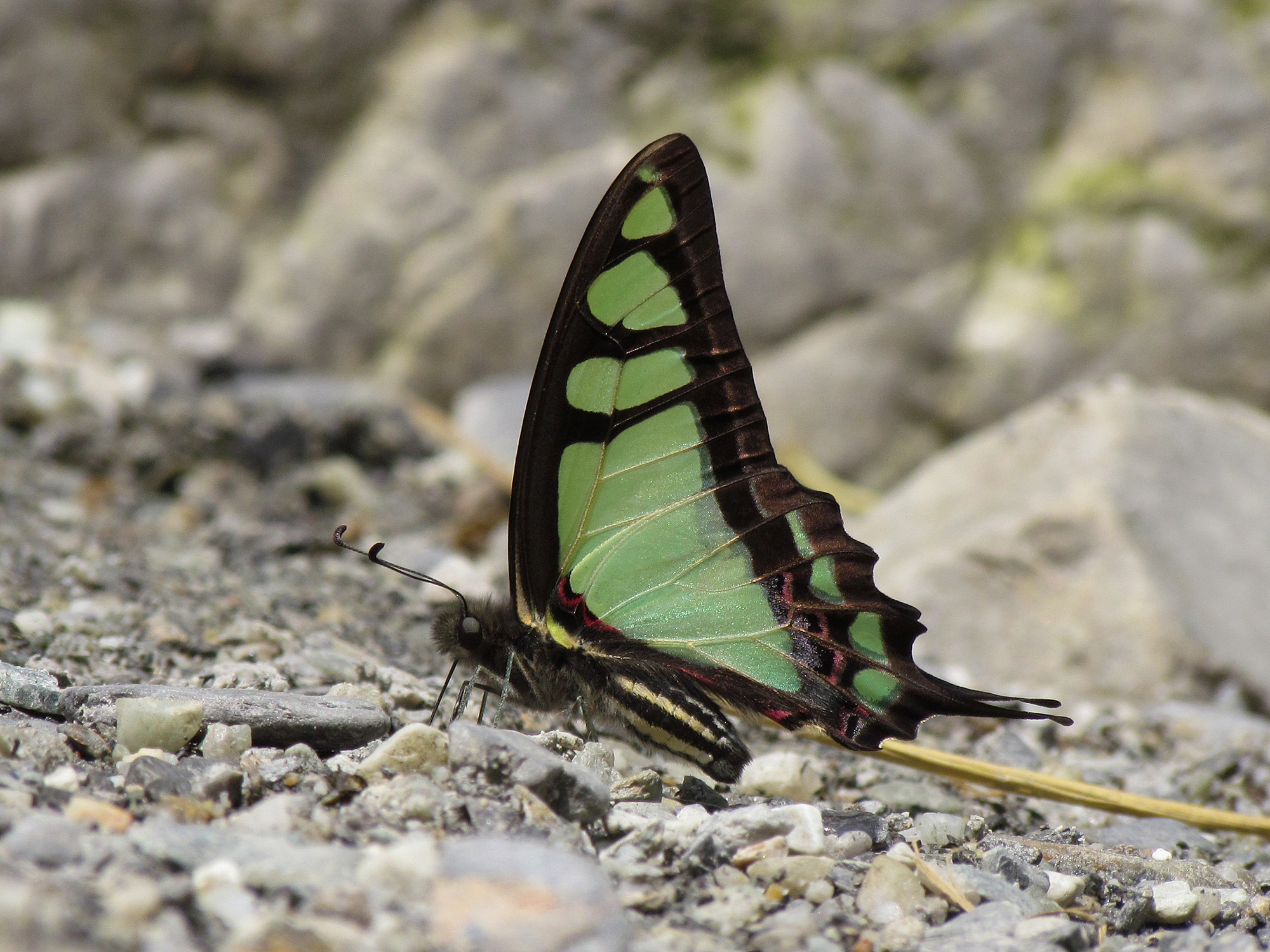
Ventral view

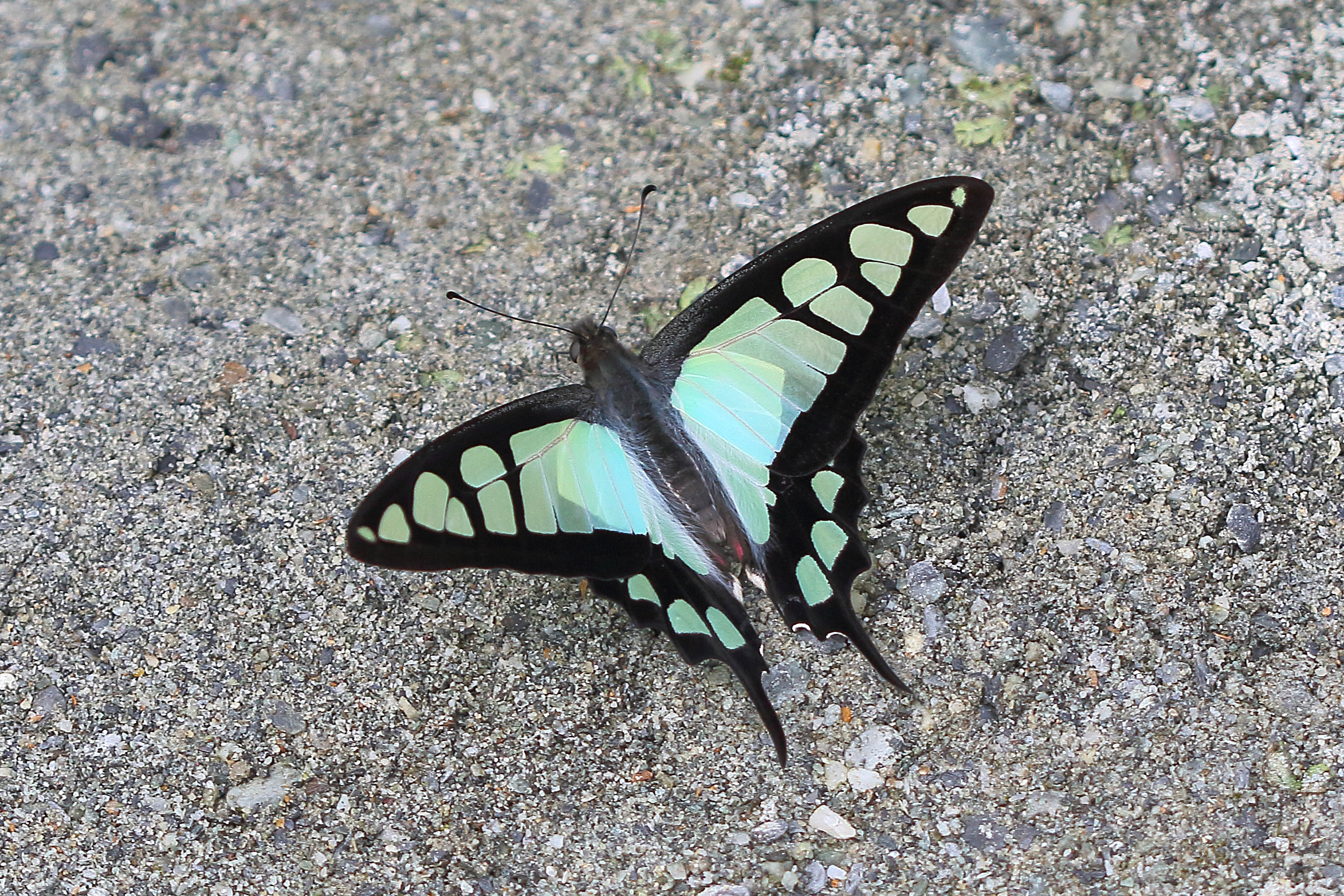
Dorsal view

===== Species: Graphium doson (common jay) =====
Subspecies: Graphium doson axionides (Himalayan common jay)

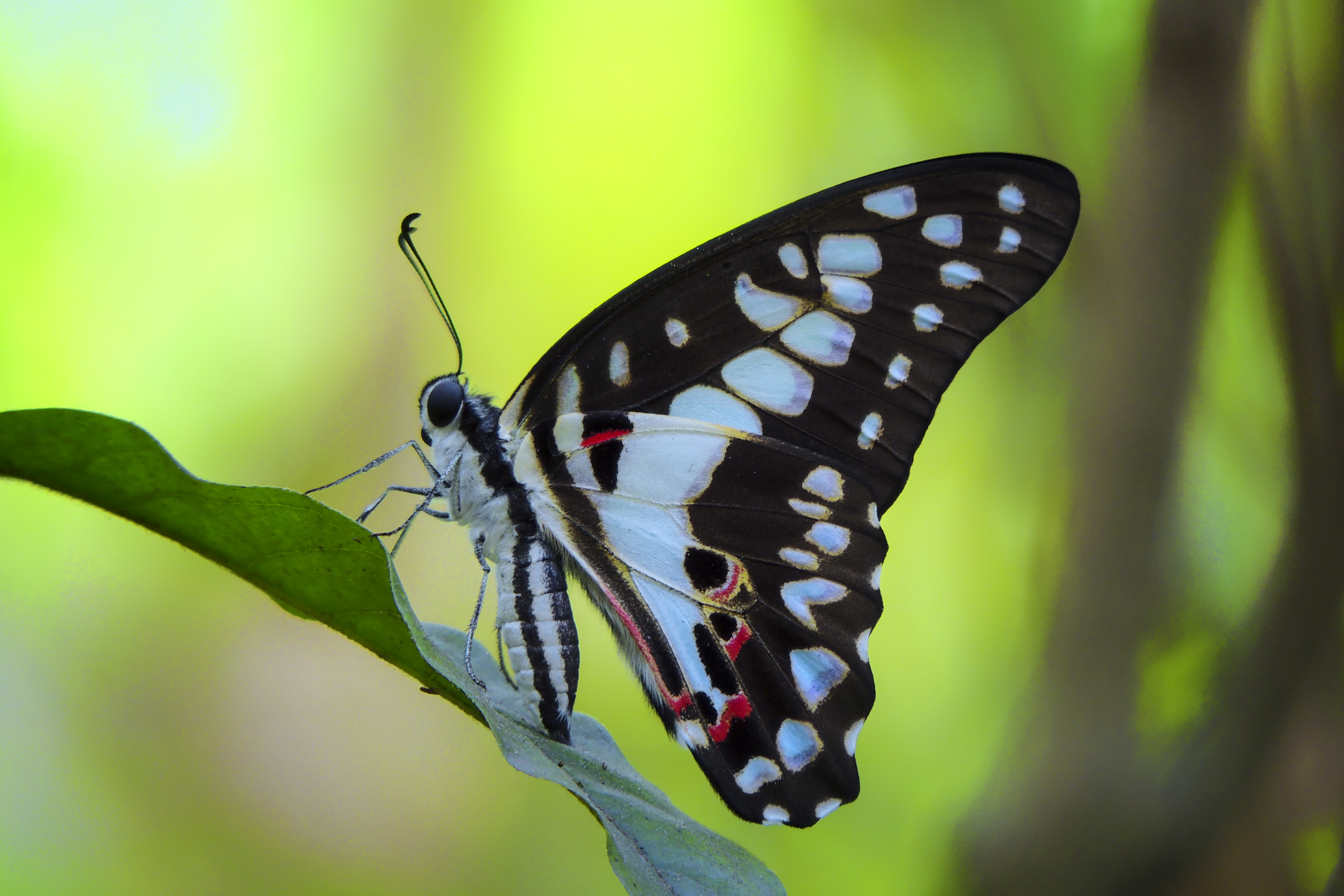
Ventral view

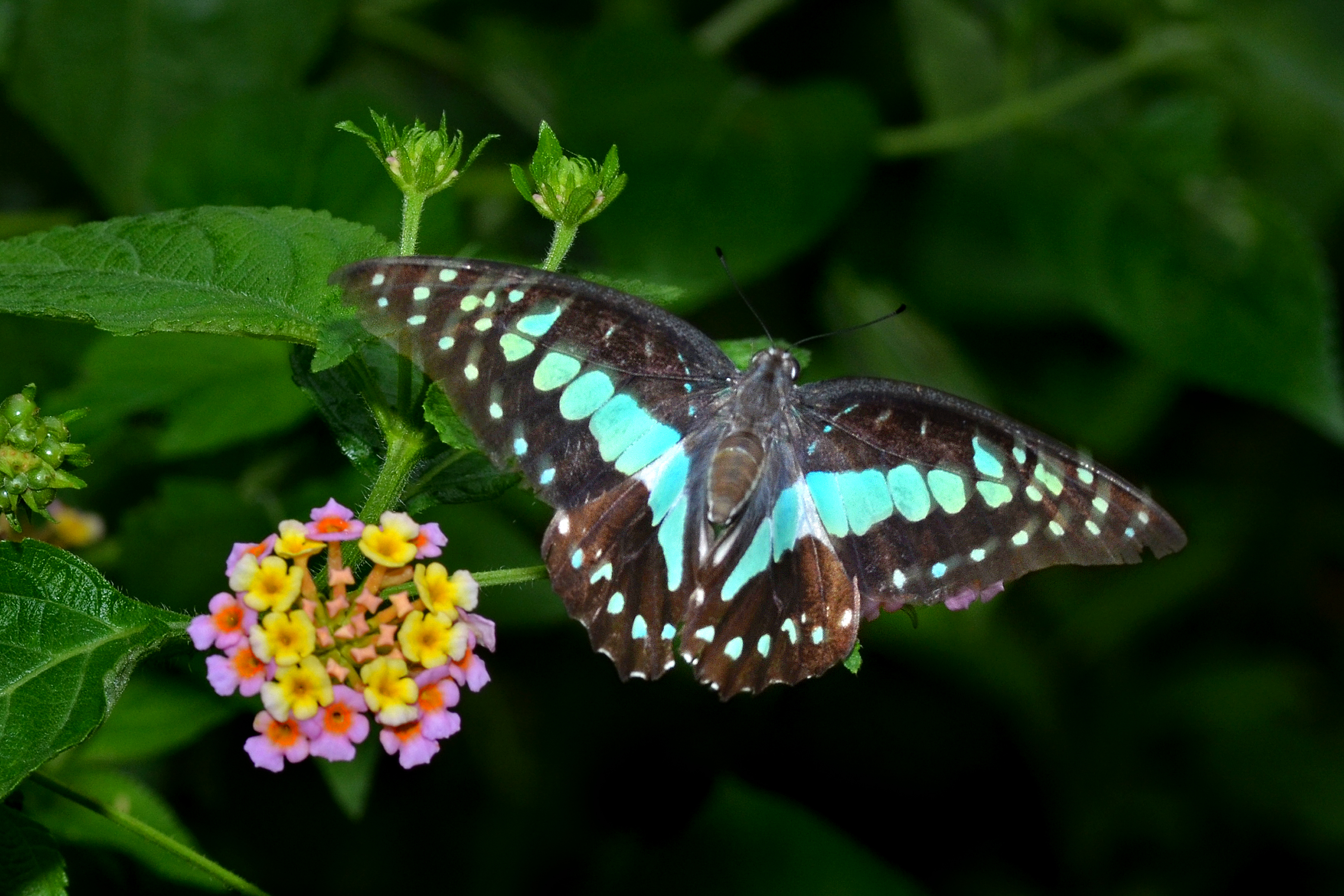
Dorsal view

===== Species: Graphium macareus (lesser zebra) =====
Subspecies: Graphium macareus indicus (east Himalayan lesser zebra)

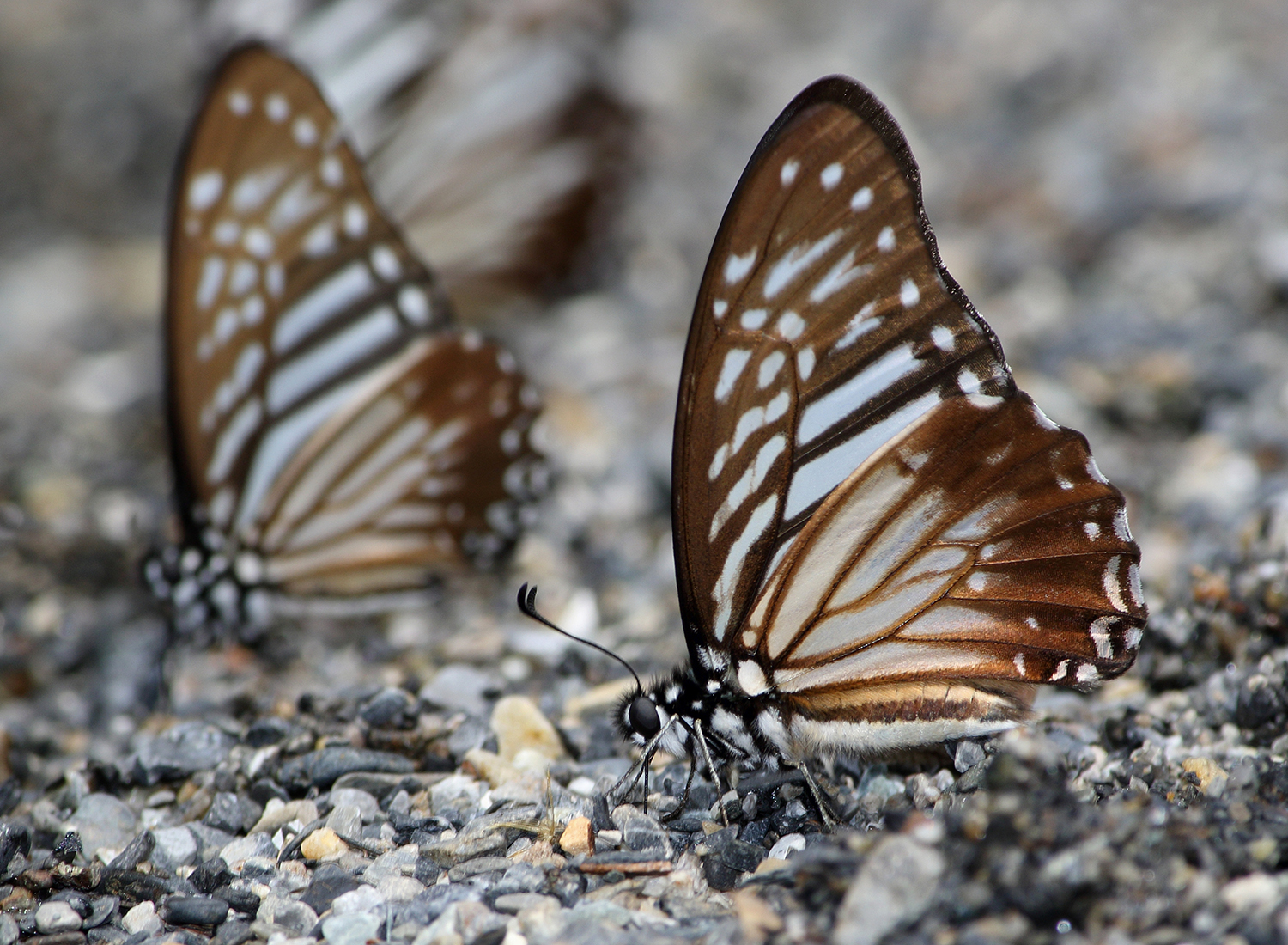
Ventral view

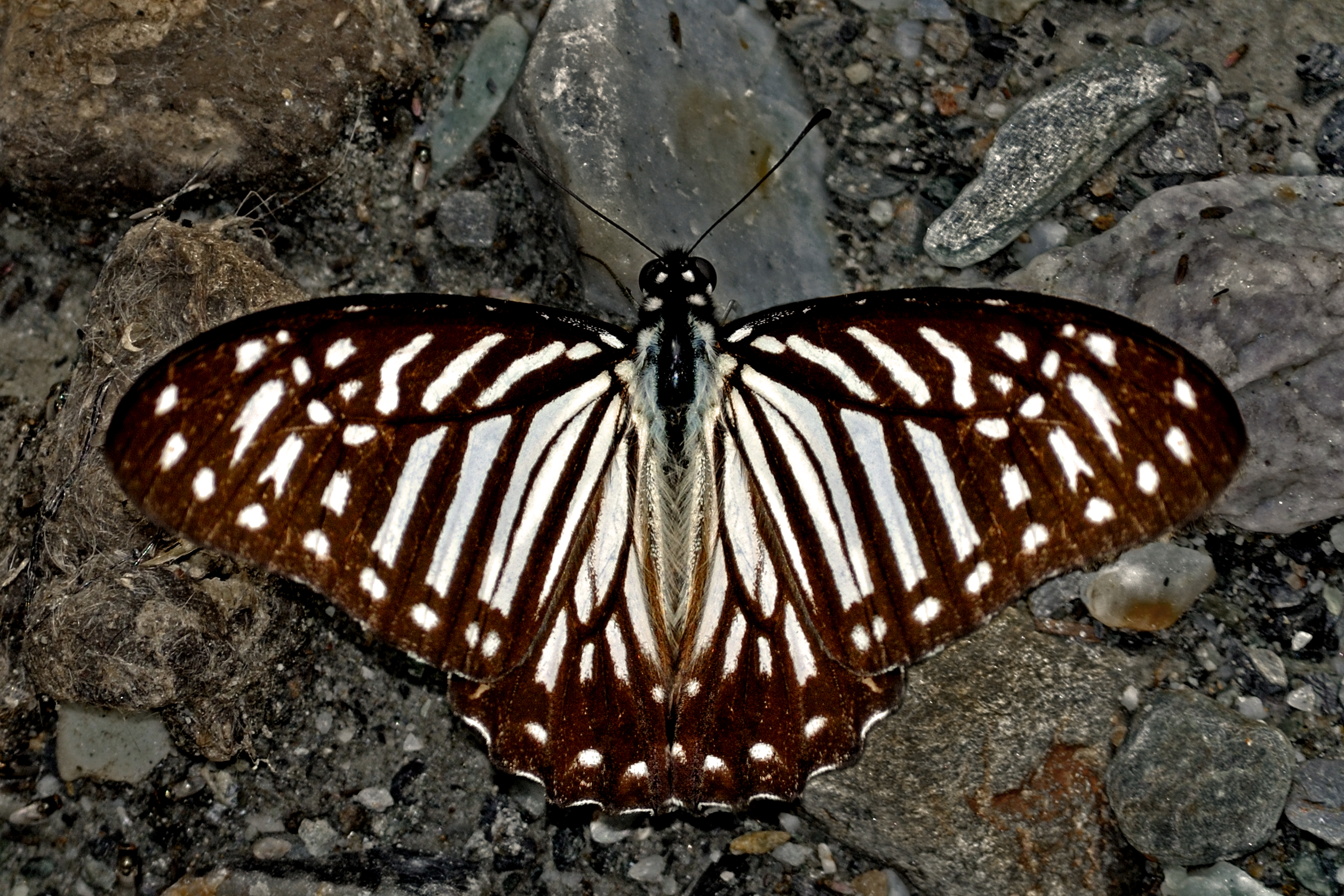
Dorsal view

===== Species: Graphium nomius (spot swordtail) =====
Subspecies: Graphium nomius nomius (Indian spot swordtail)

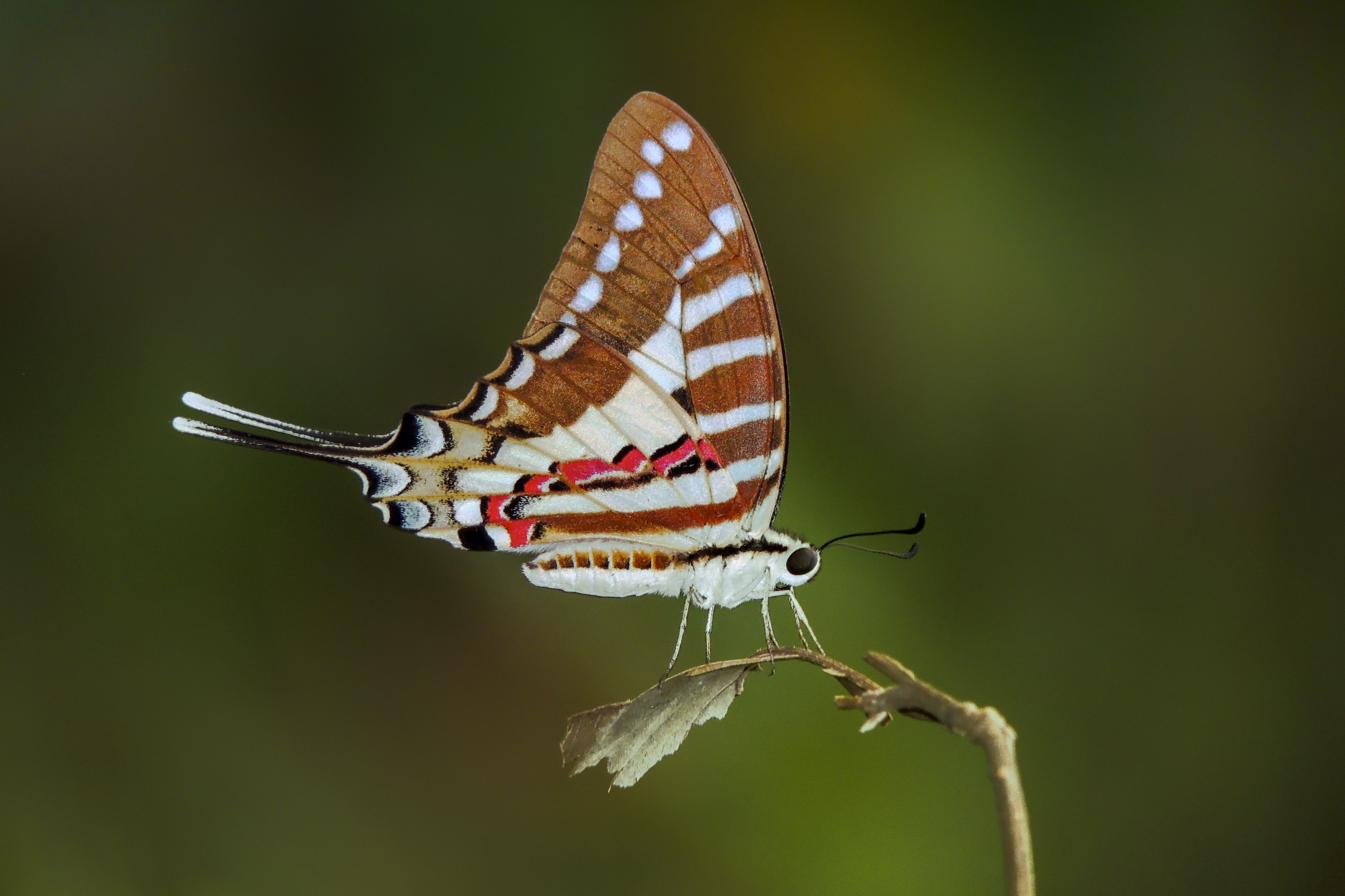
Ventral view

===== Species: Graphium sarpedon (common bluebottle) =====
Subspecies: Graphium sarpedon sarpedon (Oriental common bluebottle)

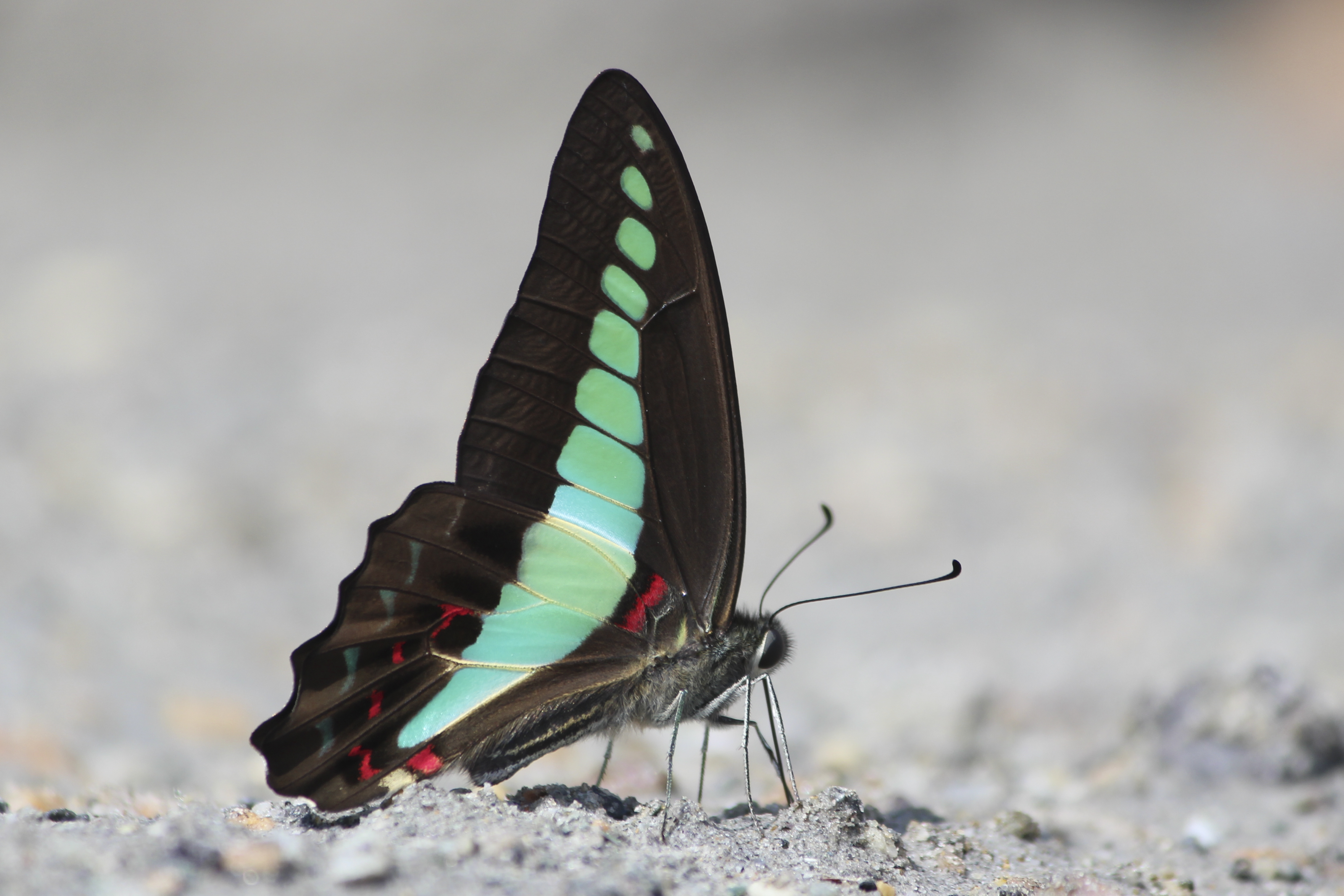
Ventral view

Tribe: Papilionini

==== Genus: Papilio (swallowtails, mimes) ====
===== Species: Papilio alcmenor (redbreast) =====
Subspecies: Papilio alcmenor alcmenor (Khasi redbreast)

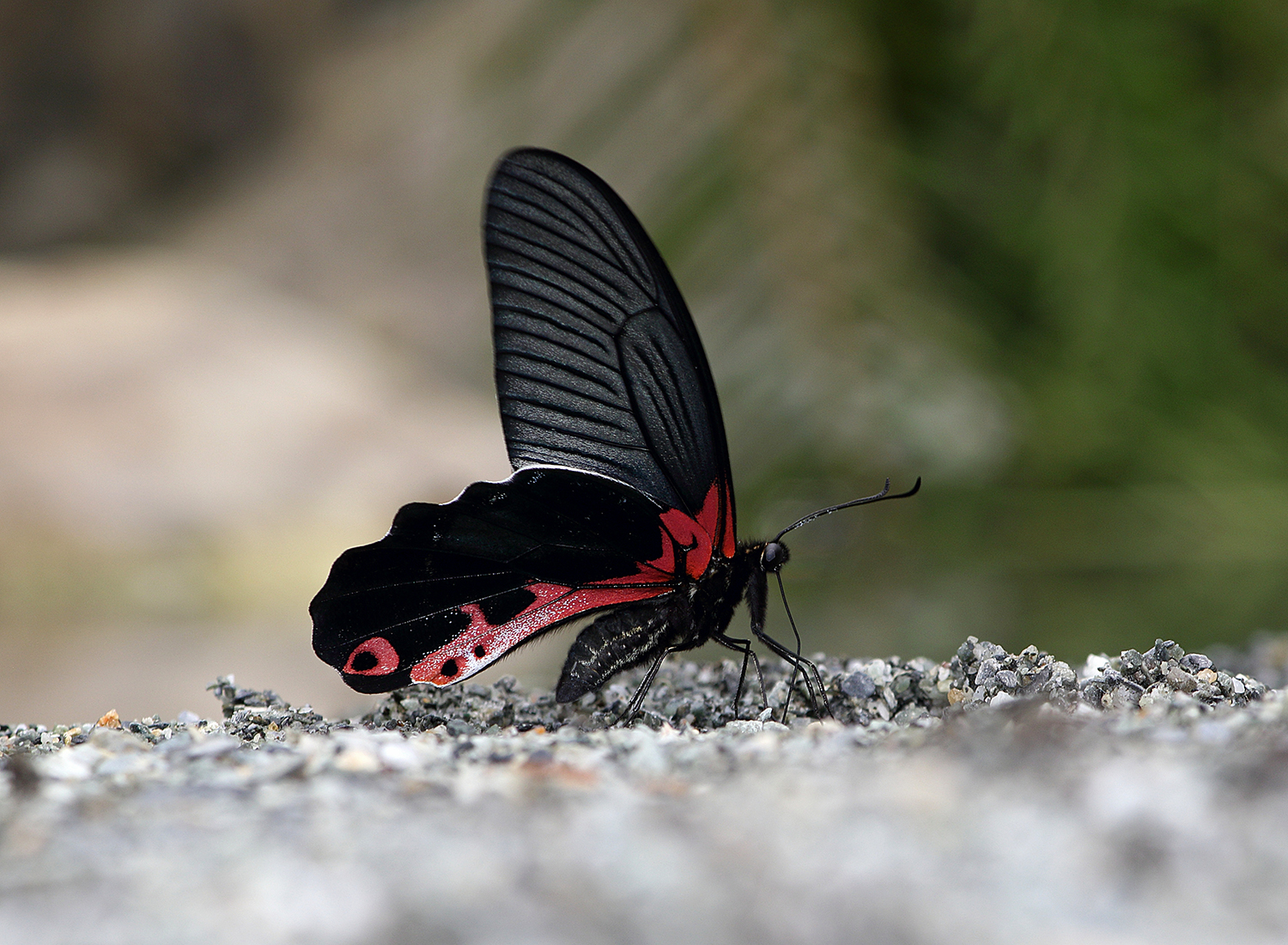
Ventral view

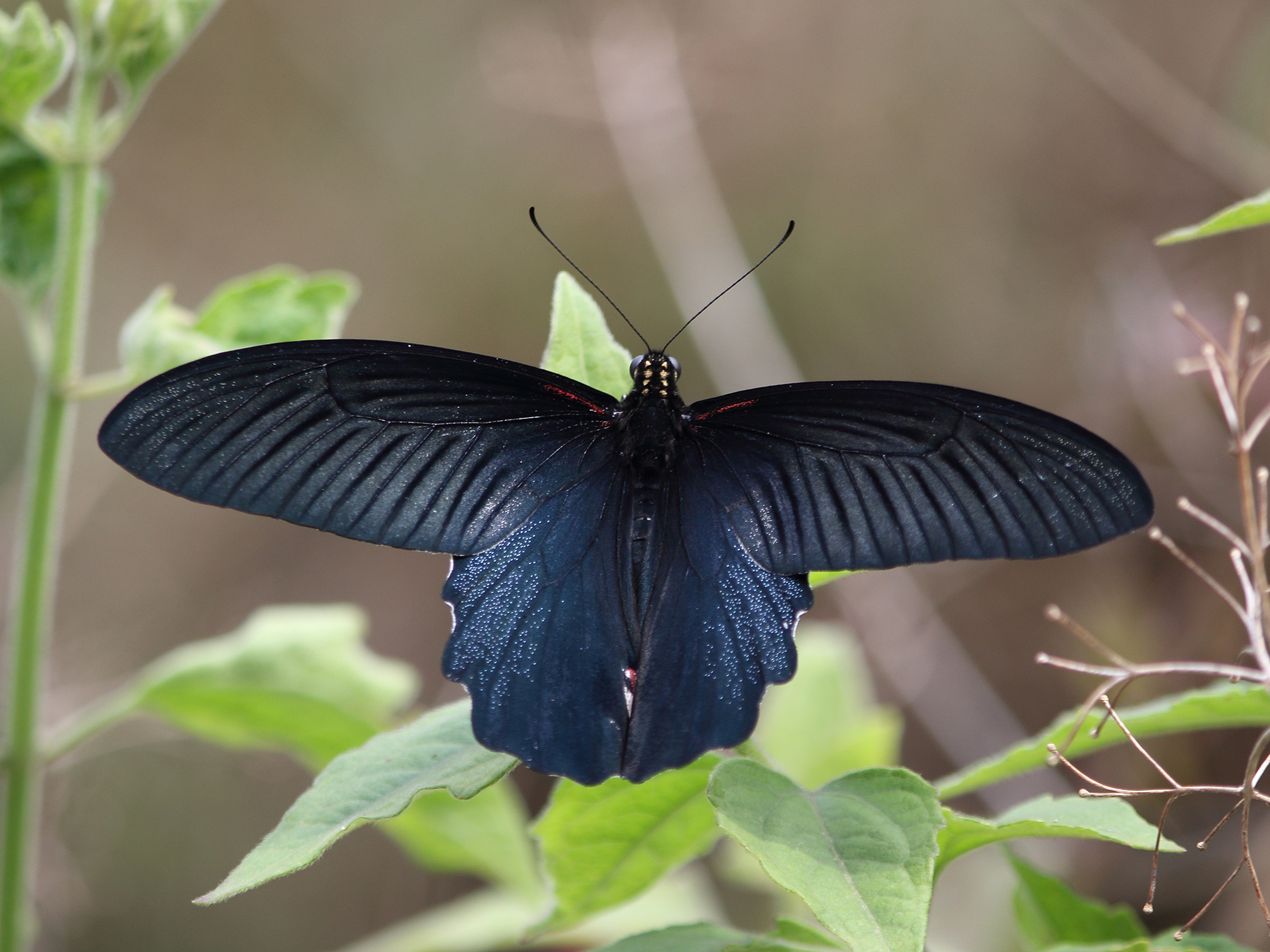
Dorsal view

===== Species: Papilio bianor (common peacock) =====
Subspecies: Papilio bianor ganesa (east Himalayan common peacock)

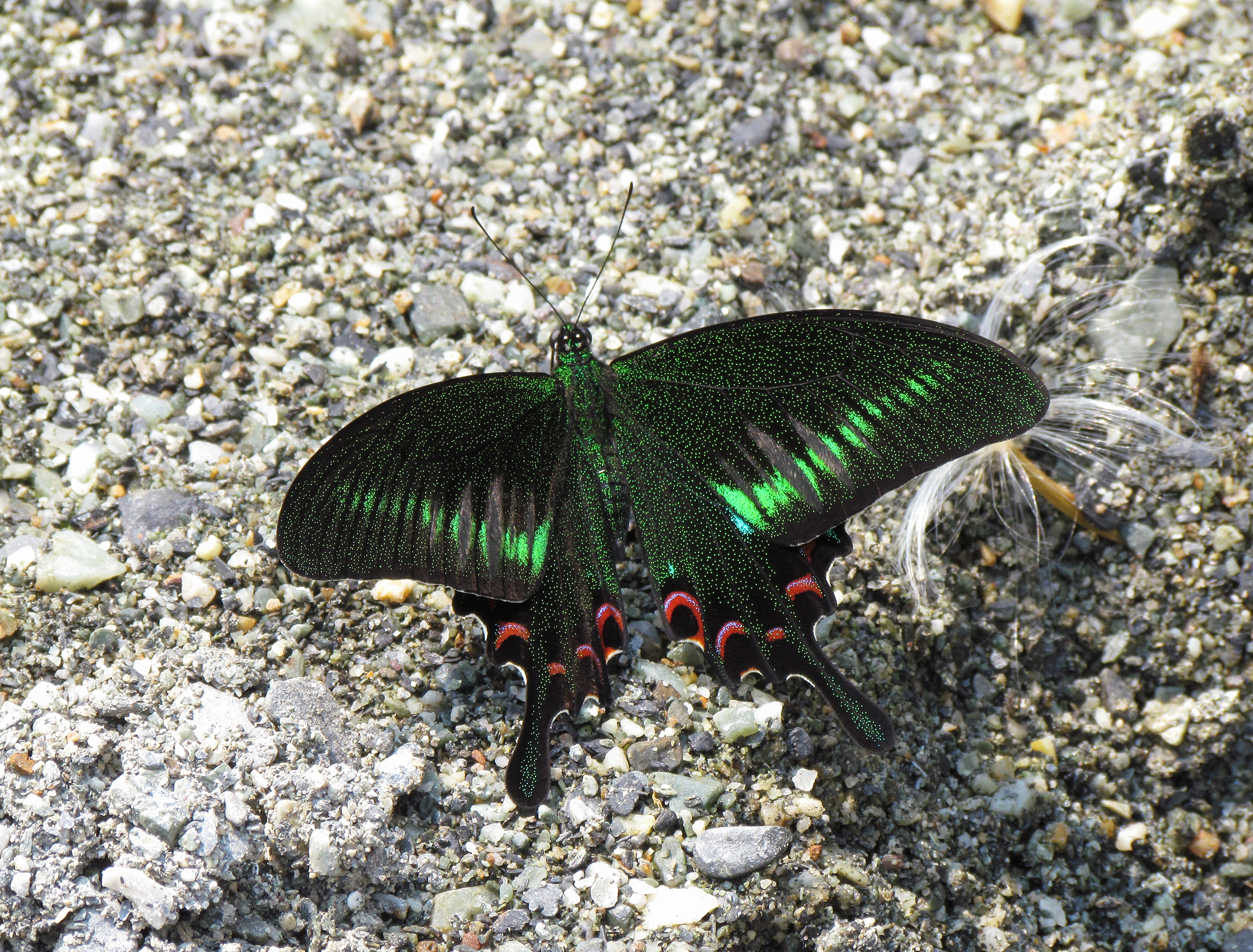
Dorsal view

===== Species: Papilio castor (common raven) =====
Subspecies: Papilio castor polias (Himalayan common raven)

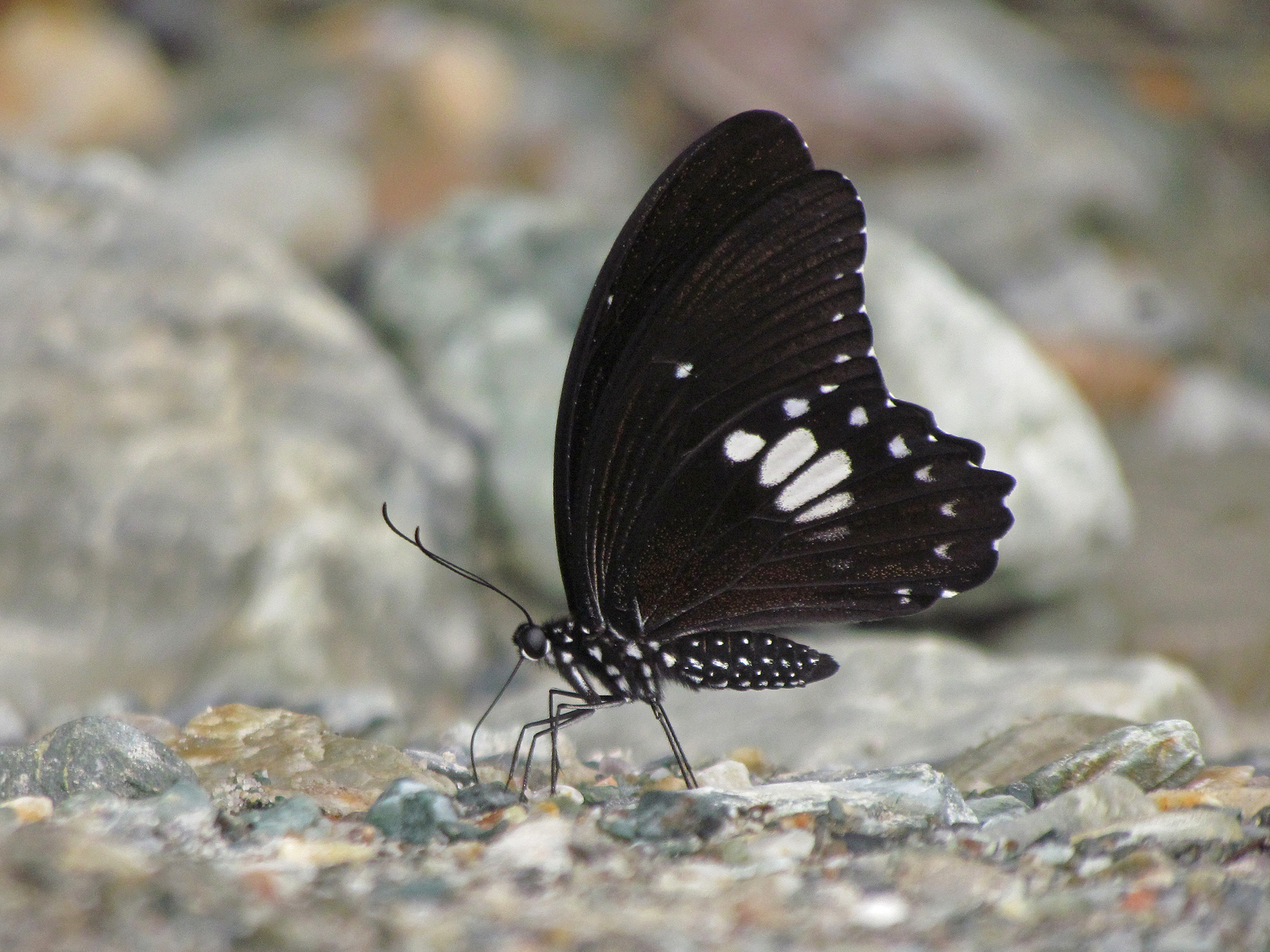
Ventral view

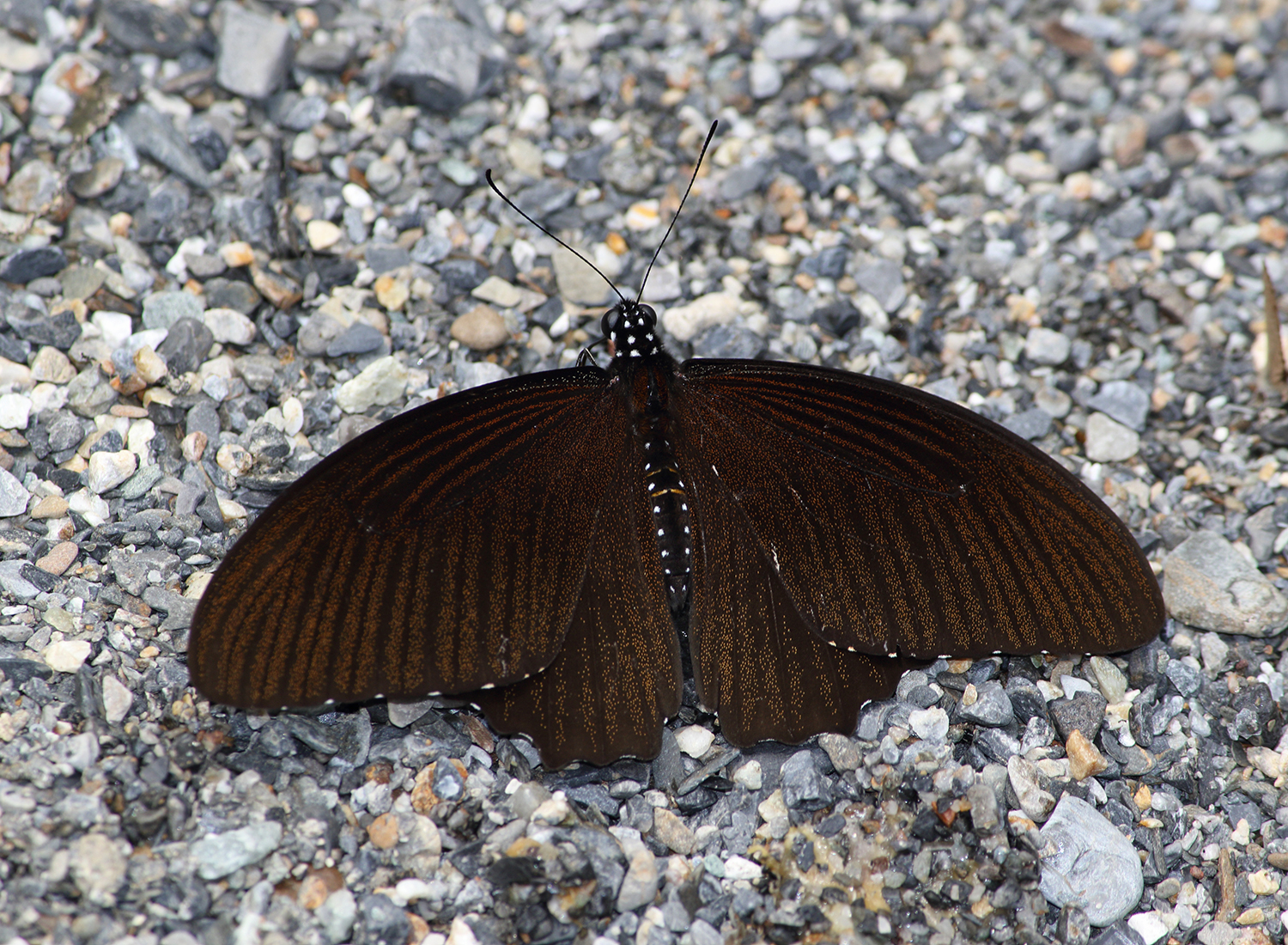
Dorsal view

===== Species: Papilio clytia (common mime) =====
Subspecies: Papilio clytia clytia (Oriental common mime)

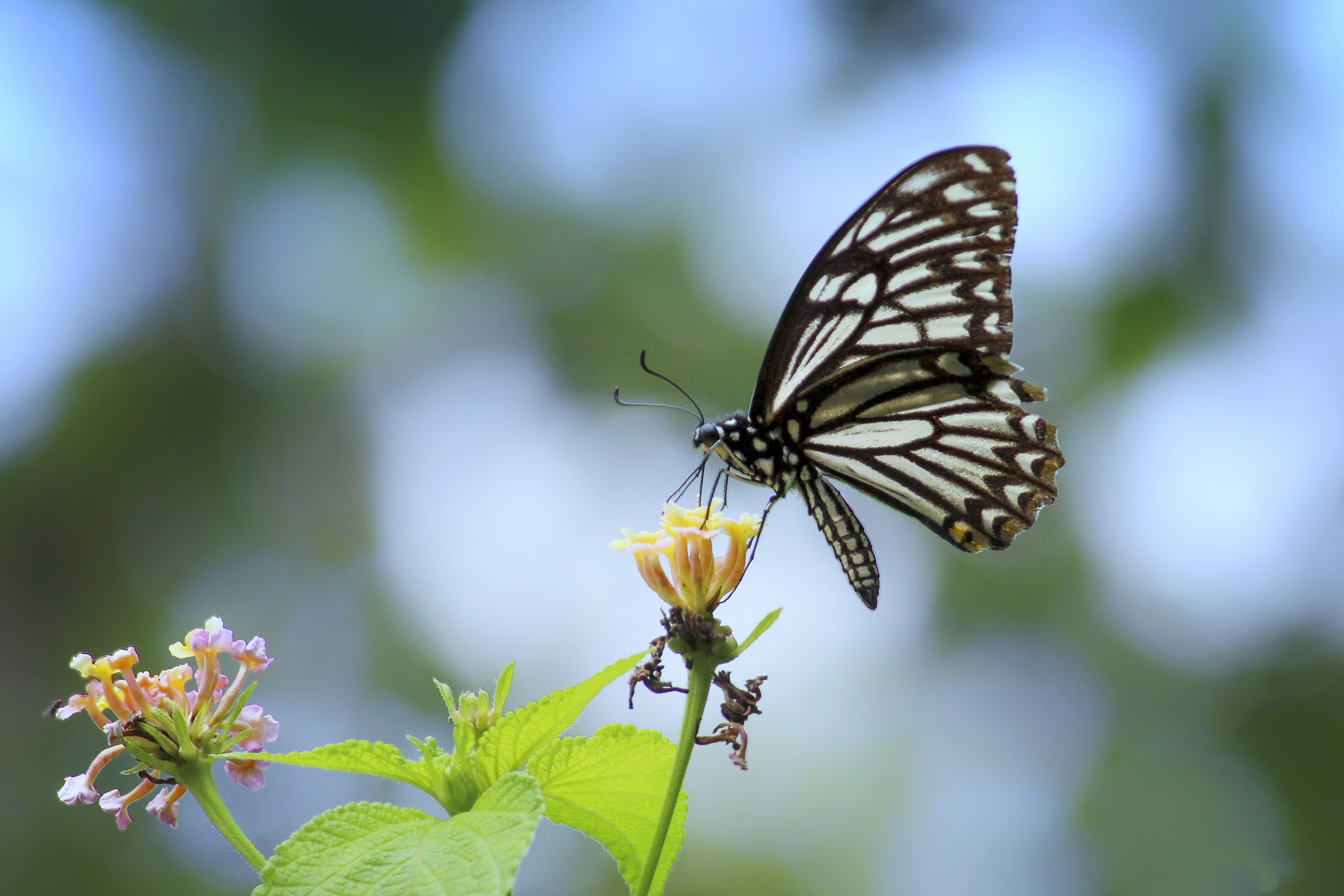
Ventral view (form dissimilis)

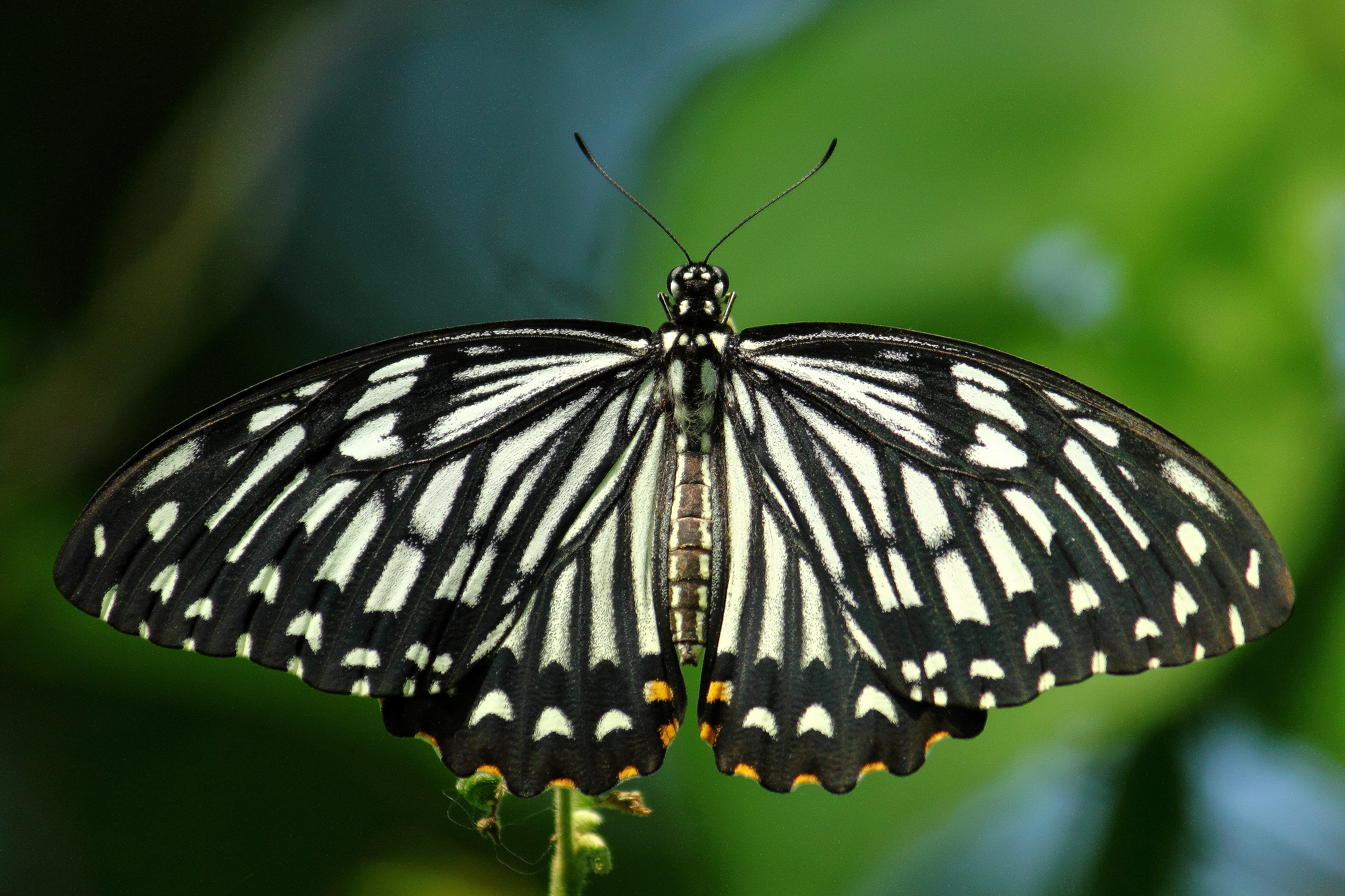
Dorsal view (form dissimilis)

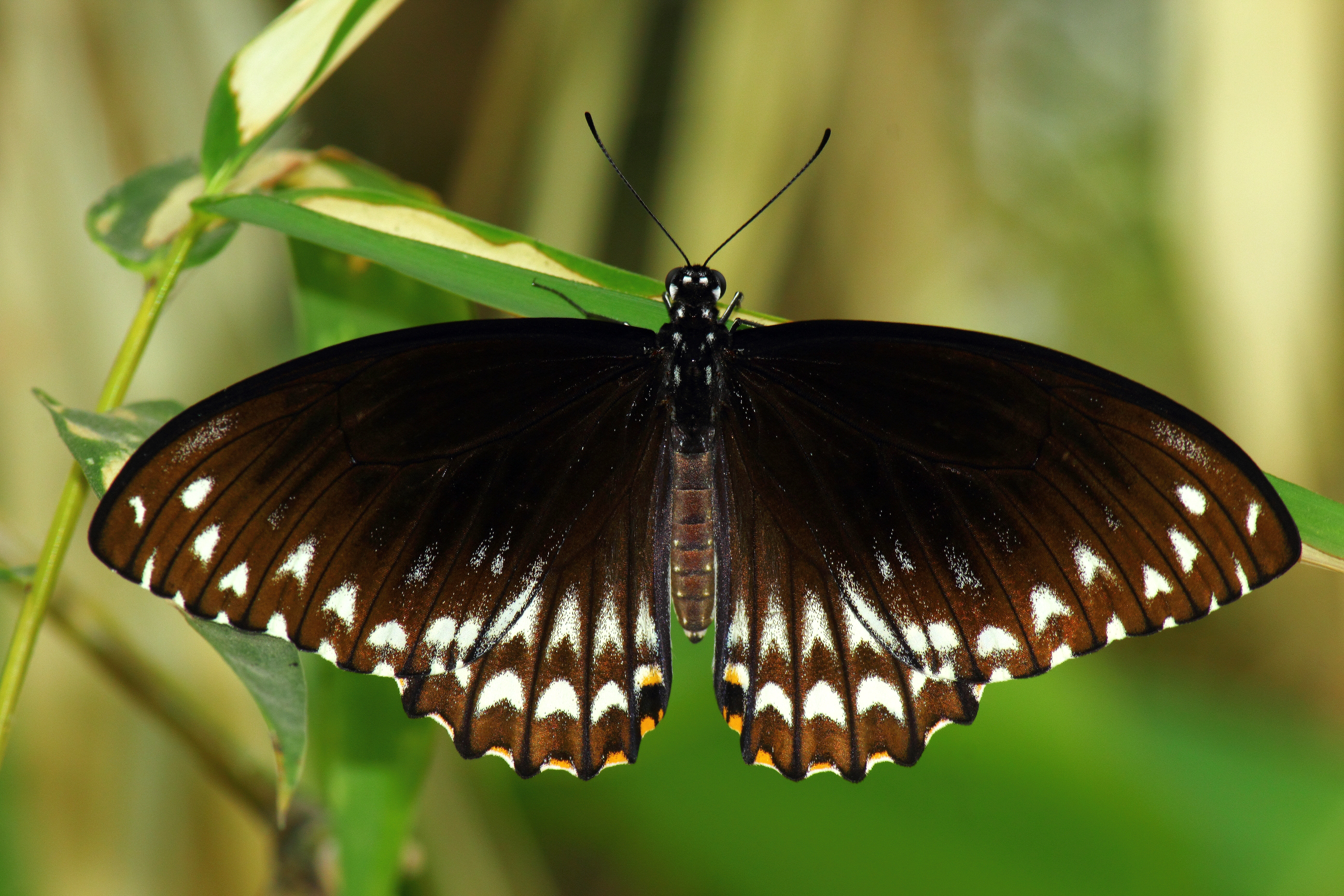
Dorsal view (form clytia)

===== Species: Papilio crino (common banded peacock) =====
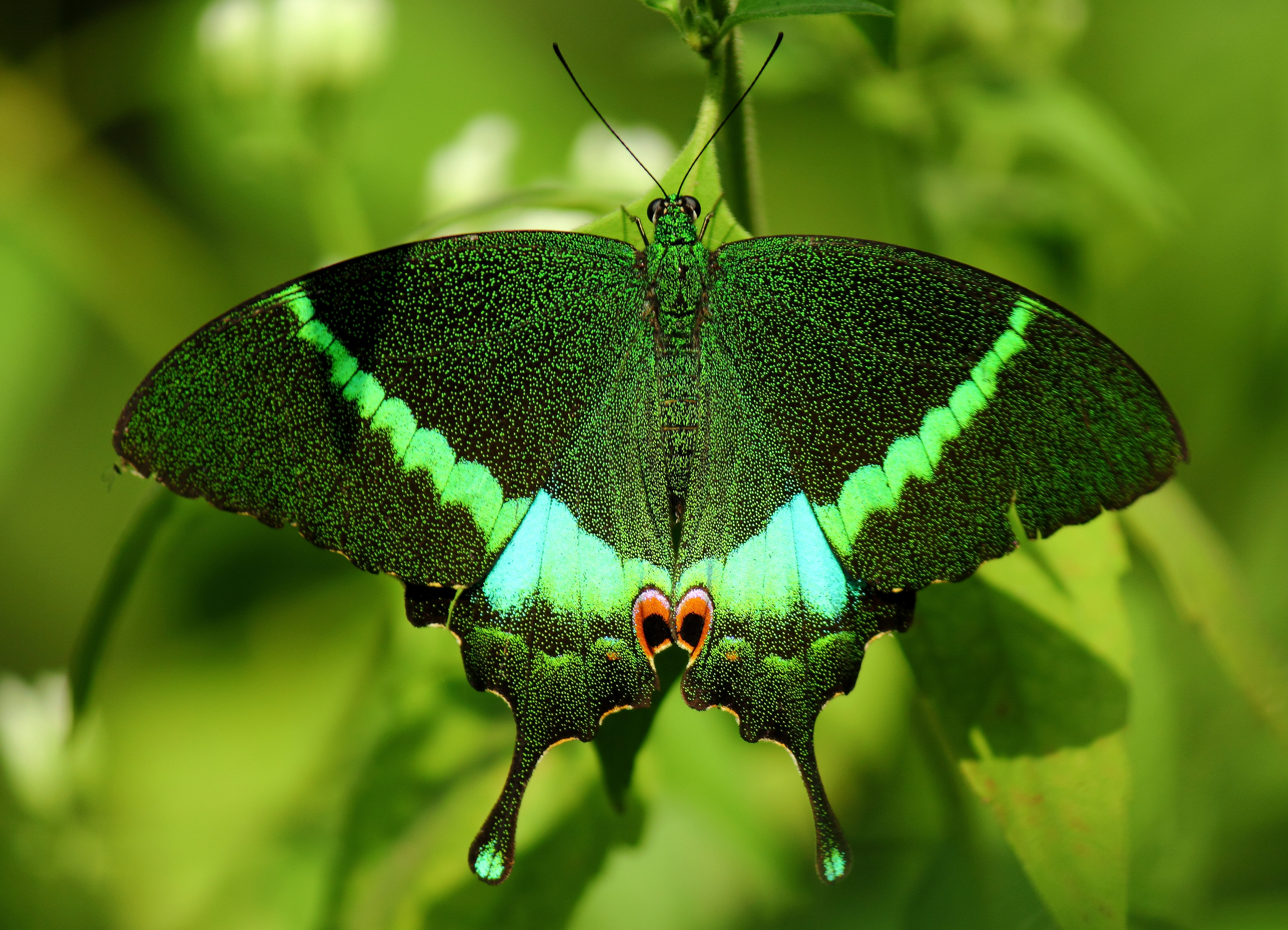
Dorsal view

===== Species: Papilio demoleus (lime swallowtail) =====
Subspecies: Papilio demoleus demoleus (northern lime swallowtail or lime butterfly)

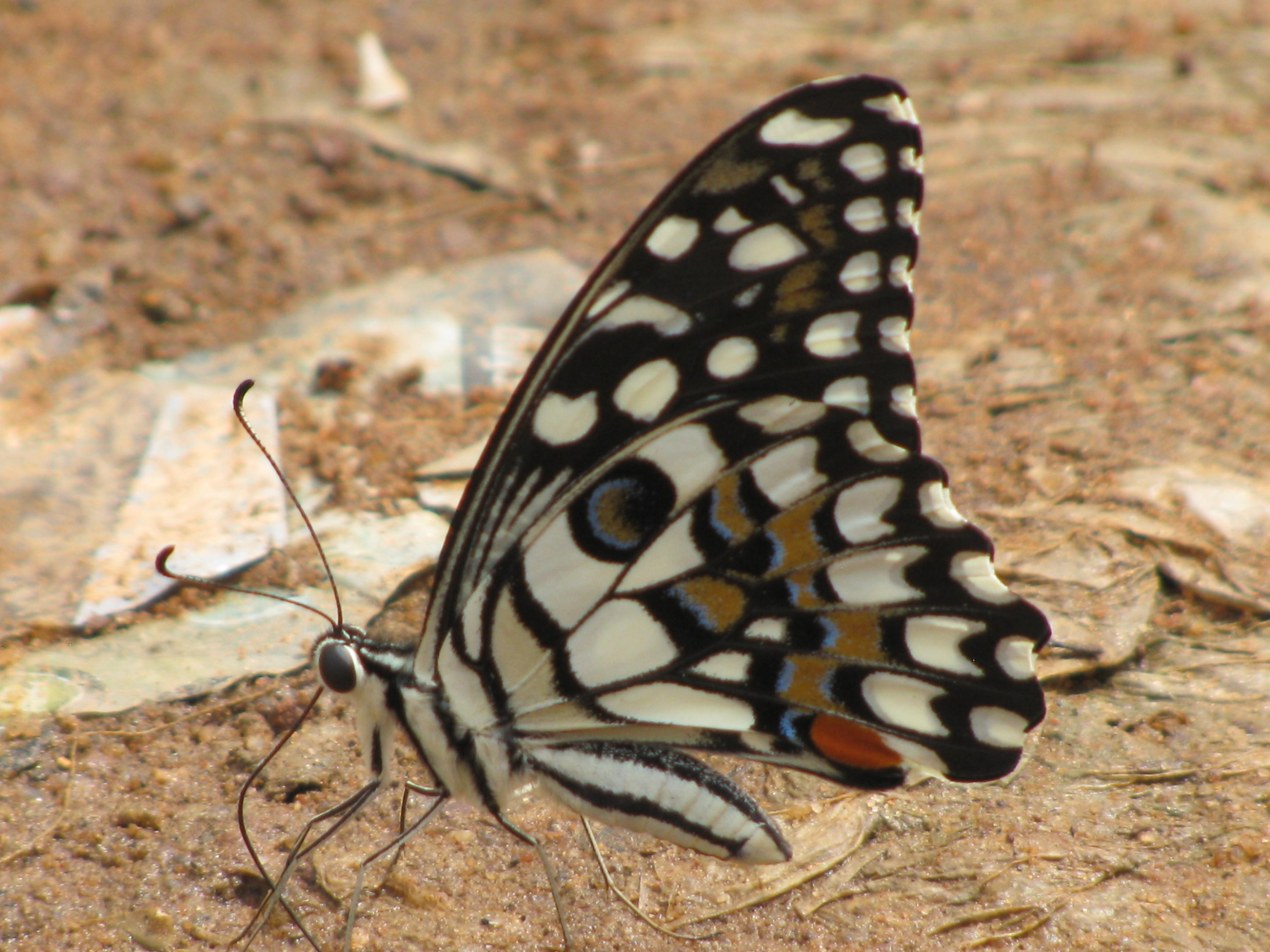
Ventral view

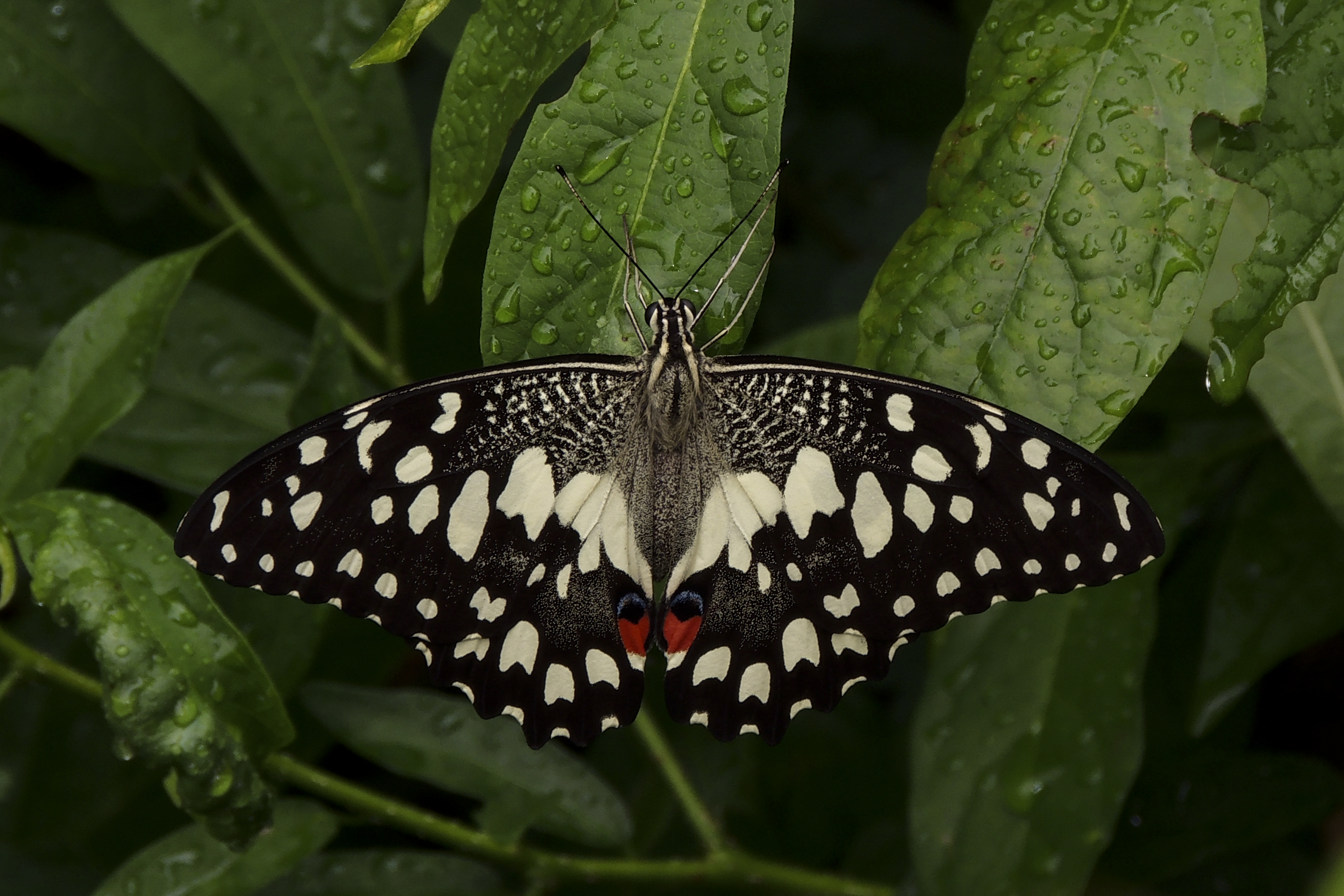
Dorsal view

===== Species: Papilio epycides (lesser mime) =====
Subspecies: Papilio epycides epycides (Himalayan lesser mime)

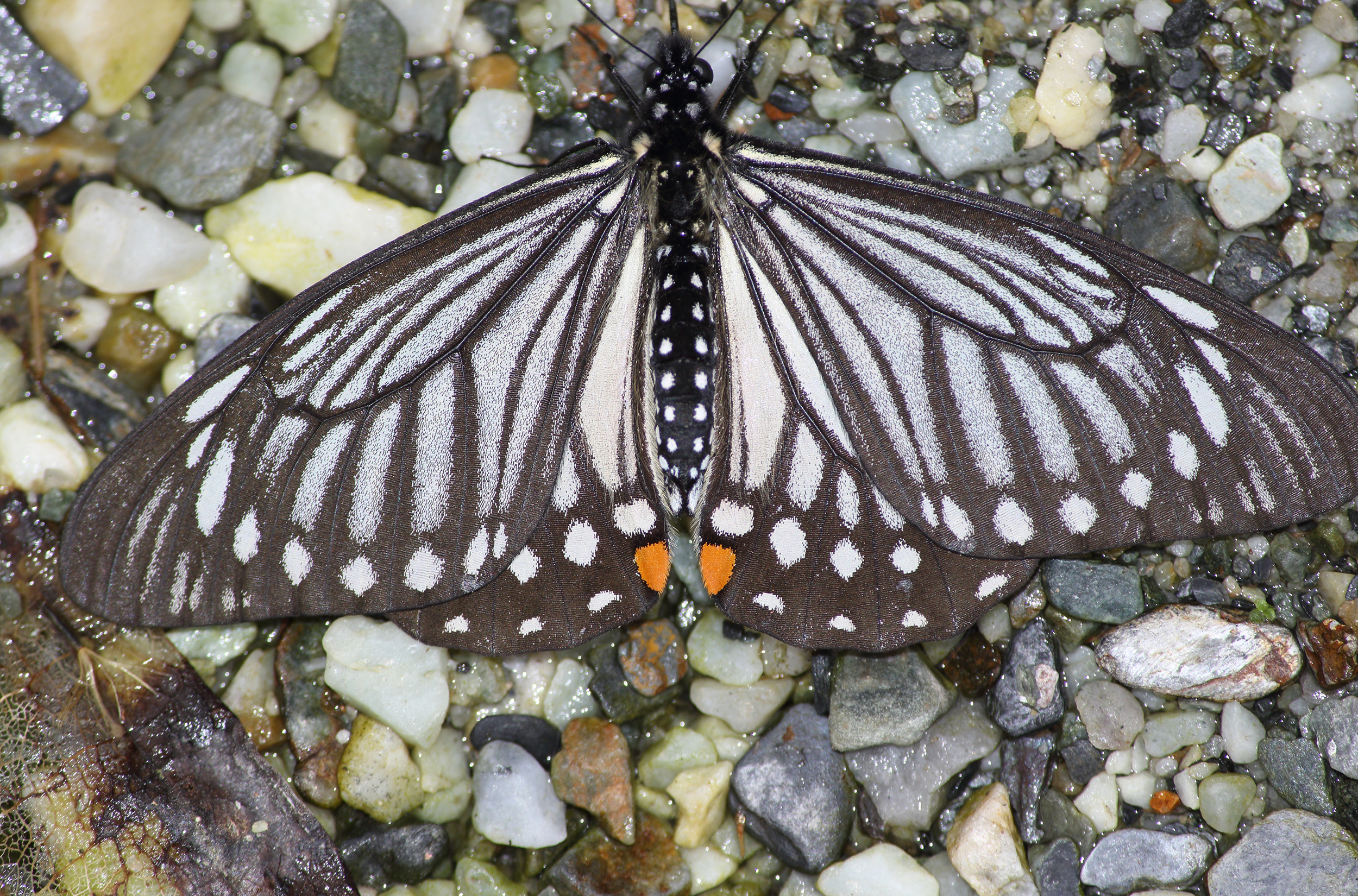
Dorsal view

===== Species: Papilio memnon (great Mormon) =====
Subspecies: Papilio memnon agenor (continental great Mormon)

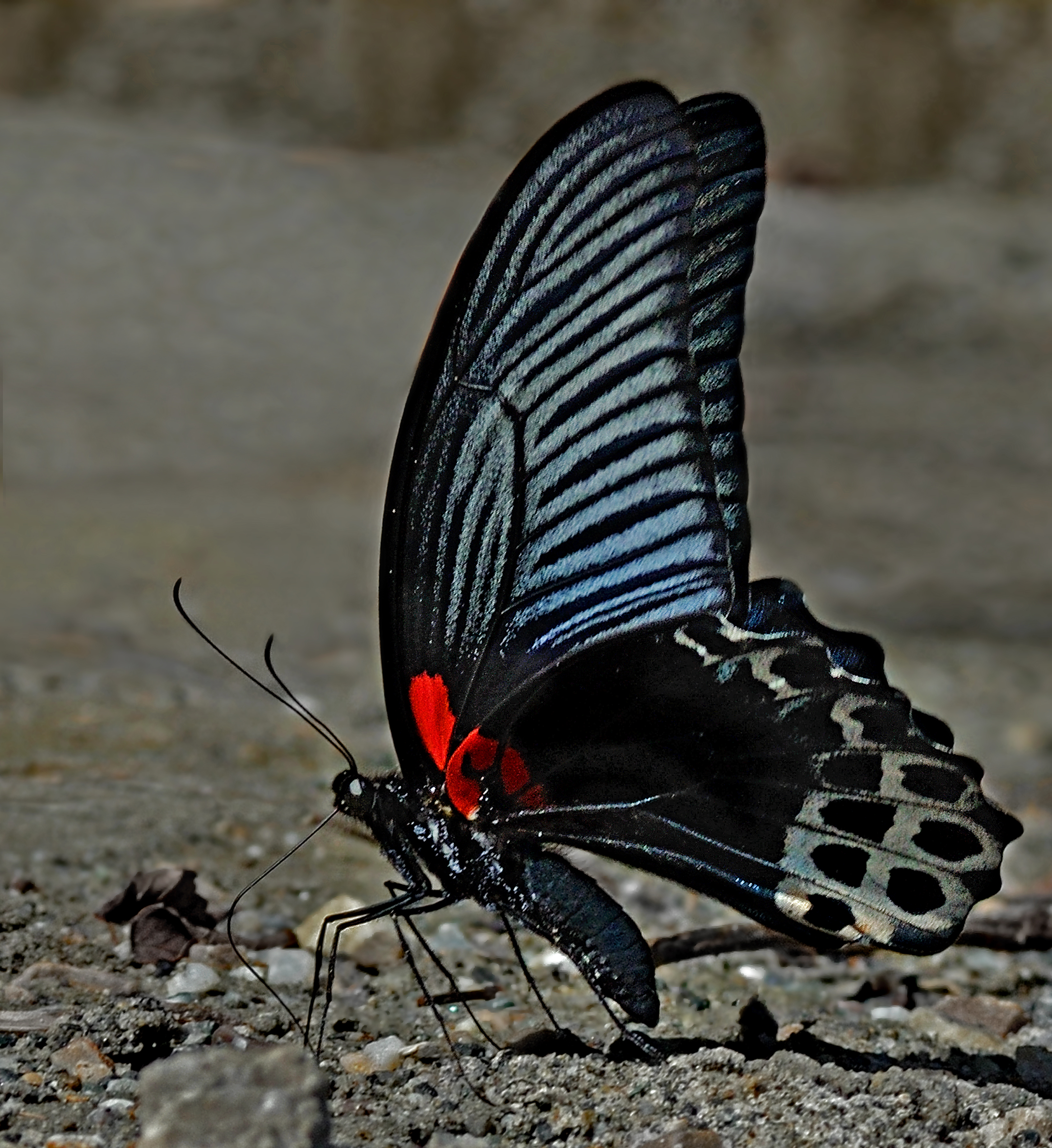
Ventral view

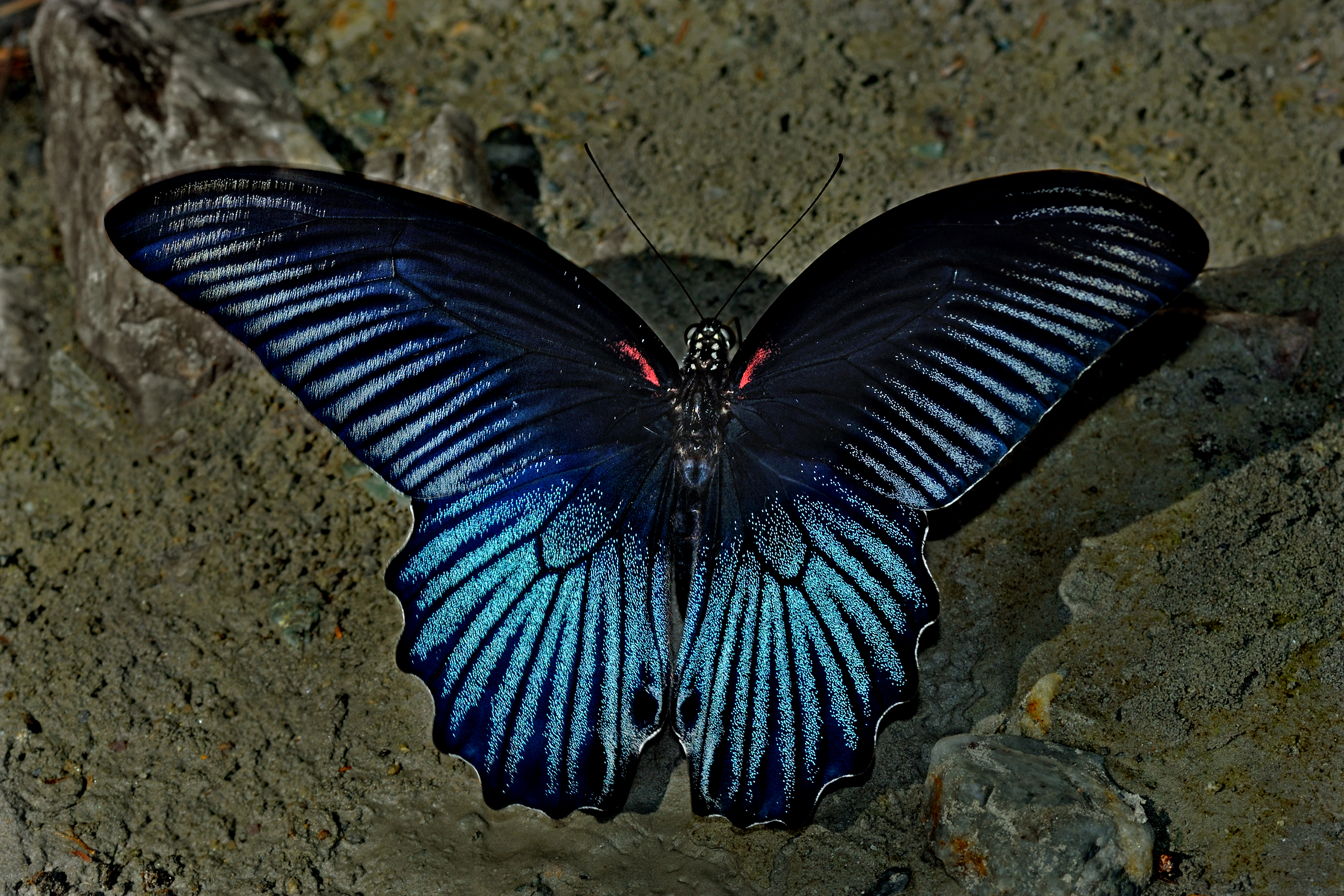
Dorsal view

===== Species: Papilio nephelus (yellow Helen) =====
Subspecies: Papilio nephelus chaon (Khasi yellow Helen)

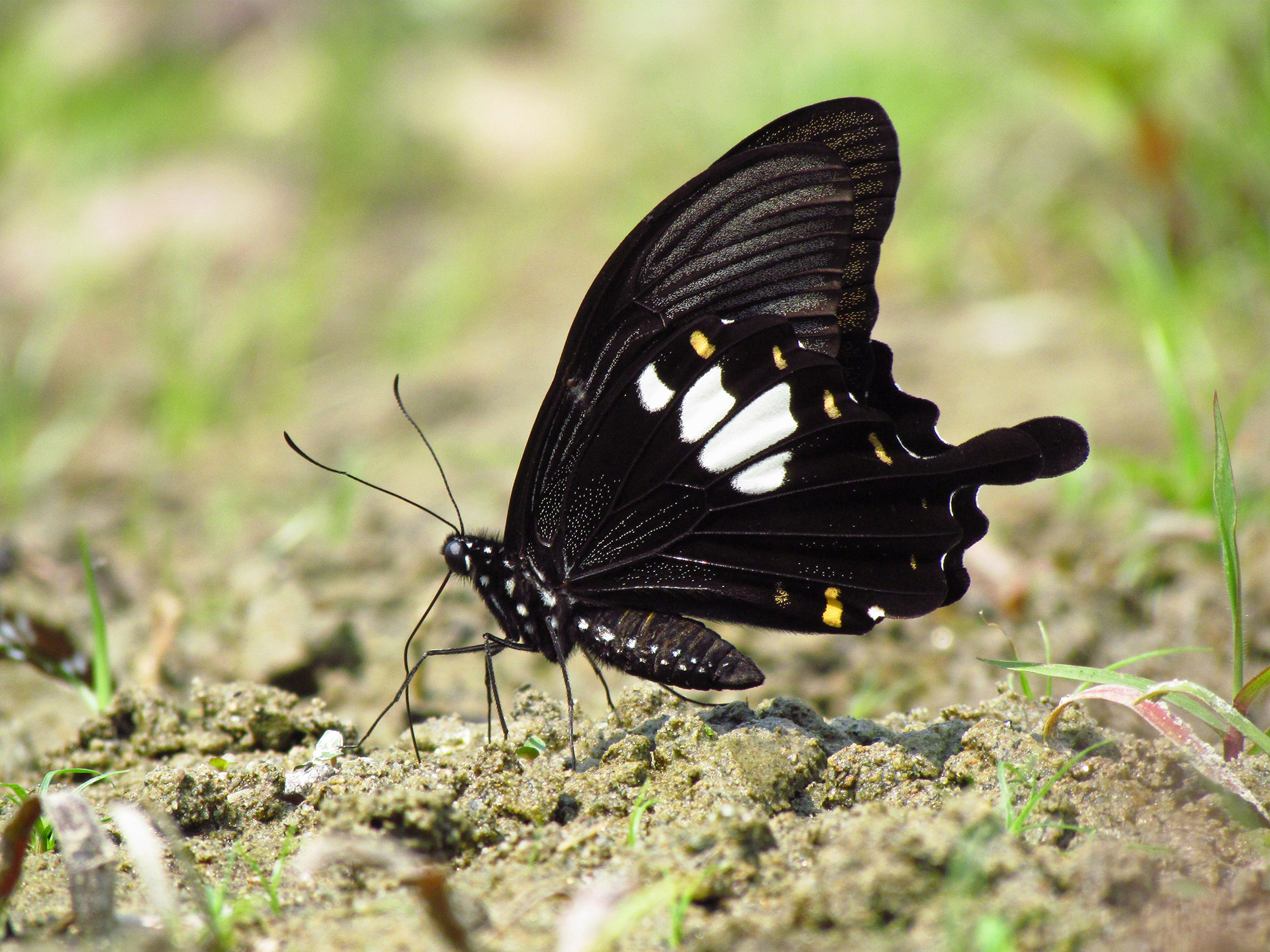
Ventral view

===== Species: Papilio paris (Paris peacock) =====
Subspecies: Papilio paris paris (Chinese Paris peacock)

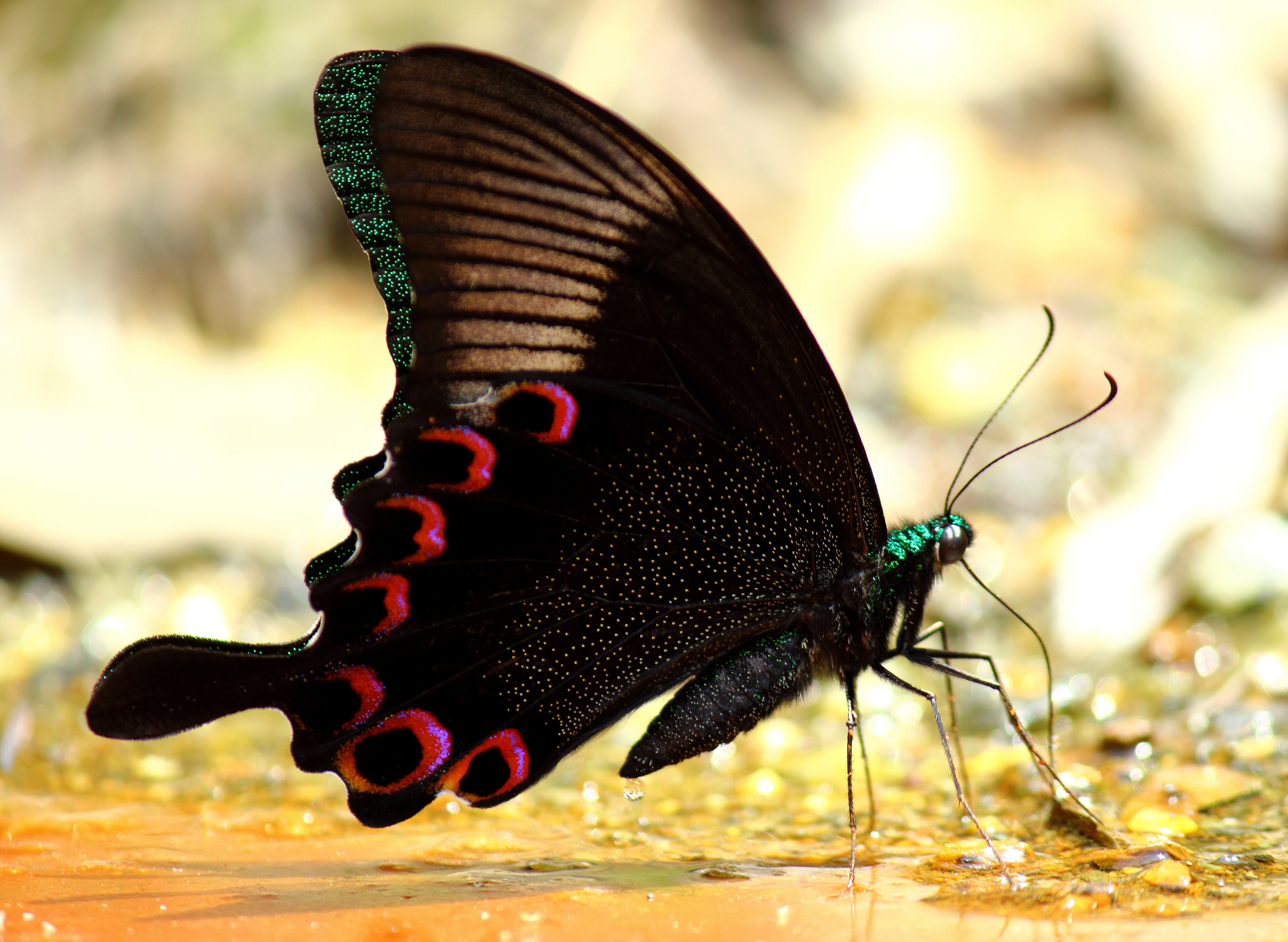
Ventral view

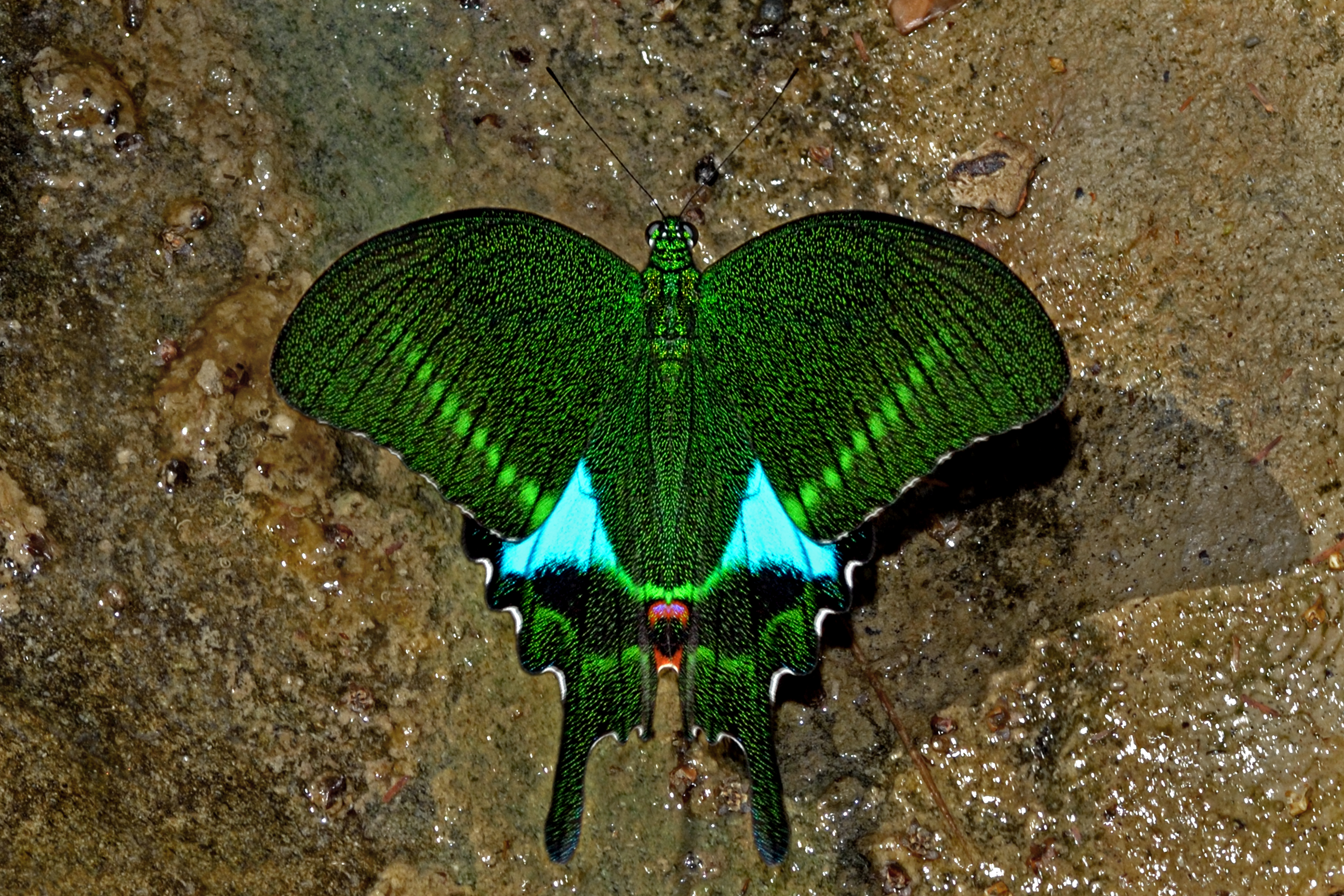
Dorsal view

===== Species: Papilio polymnestor (blue Mormon) =====
Subspecies: Papilio polymnestor polymnestor (Indian blue Mormon)

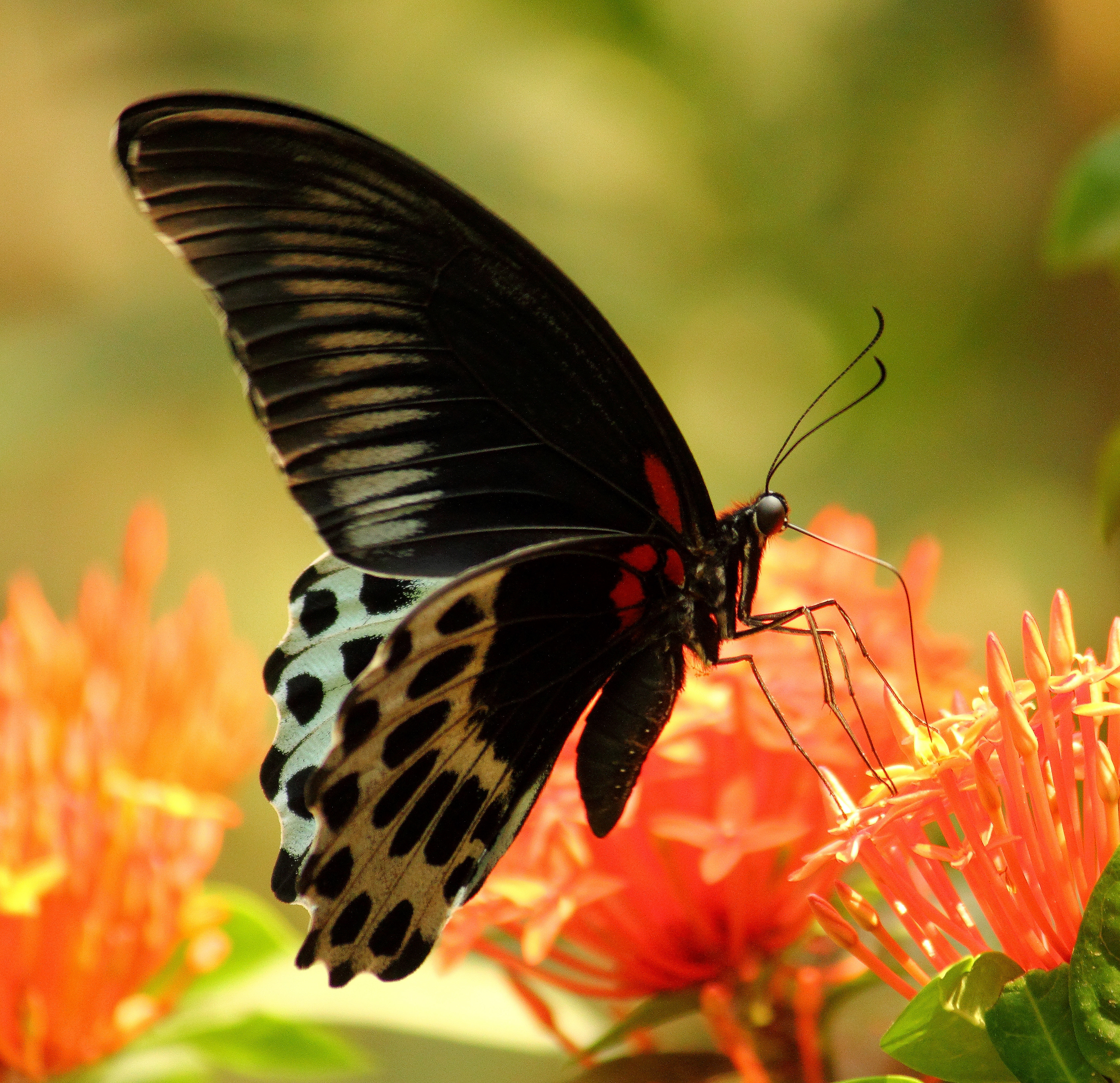
Ventral view

===== Species: Papilio polytes (common Mormon) =====
Subspecies: Papilio polytes romulus (Indian common Mormon)

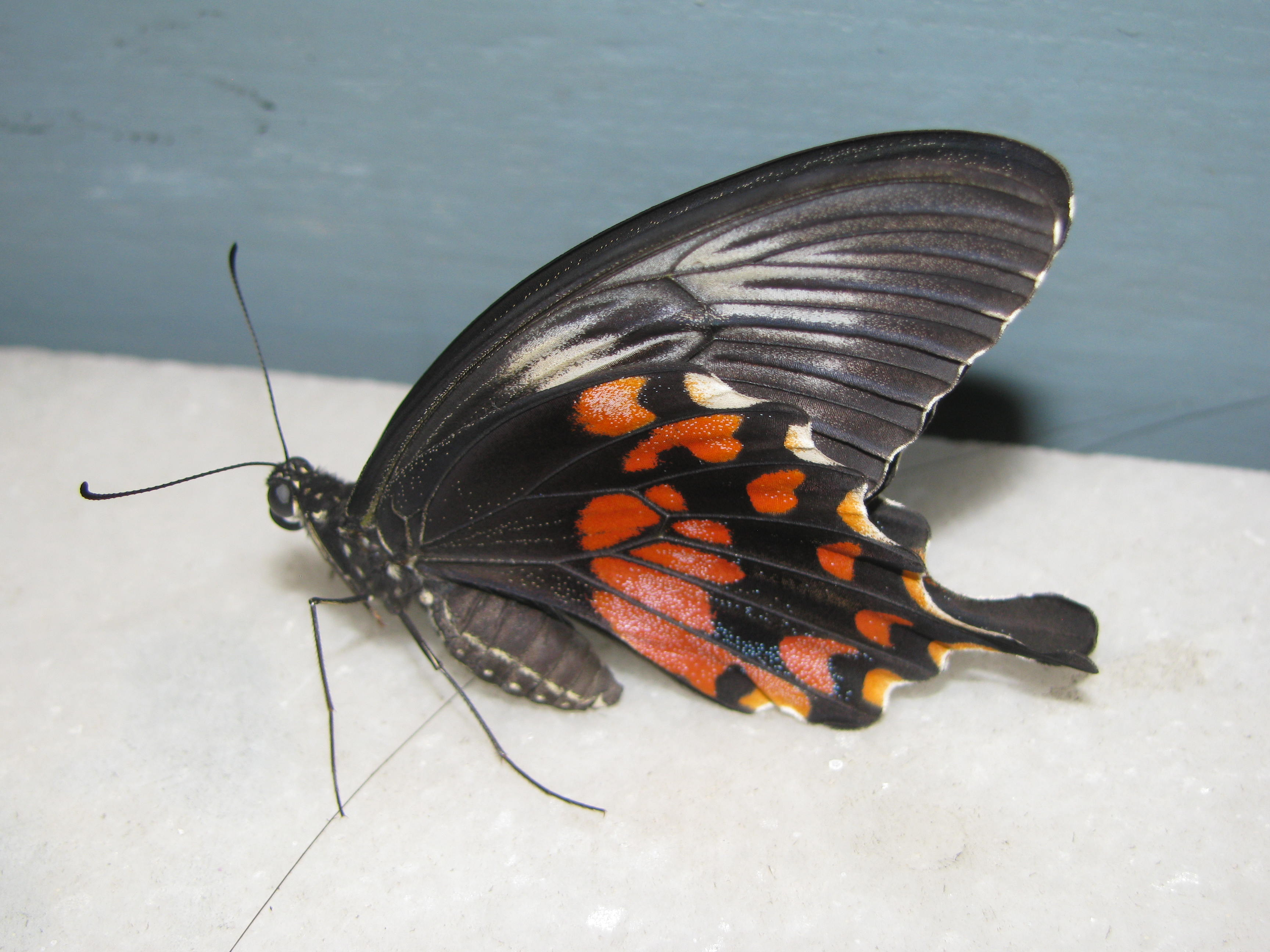
Ventral view female (romulus form)

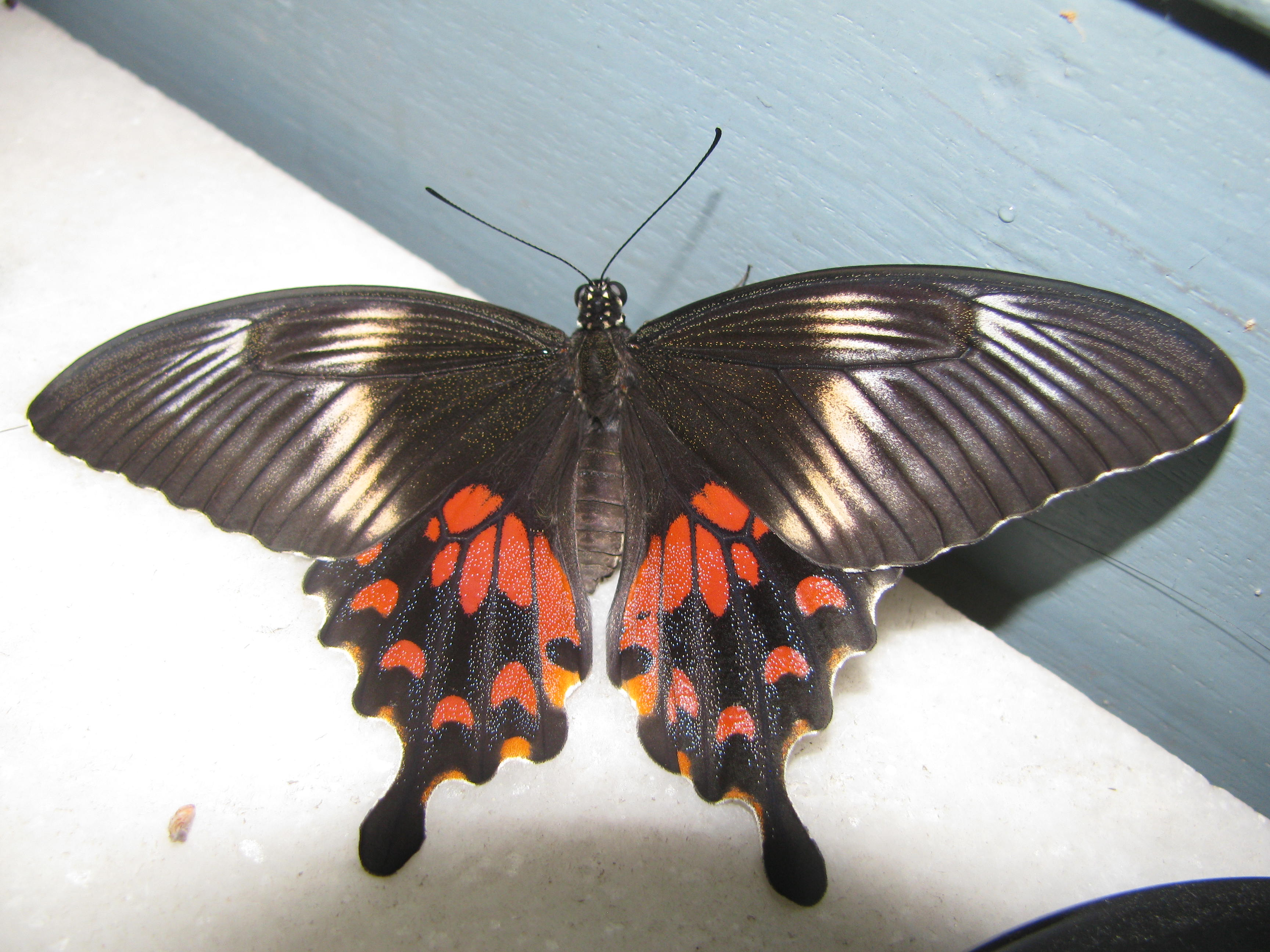
Dorsal view female (romulus form)

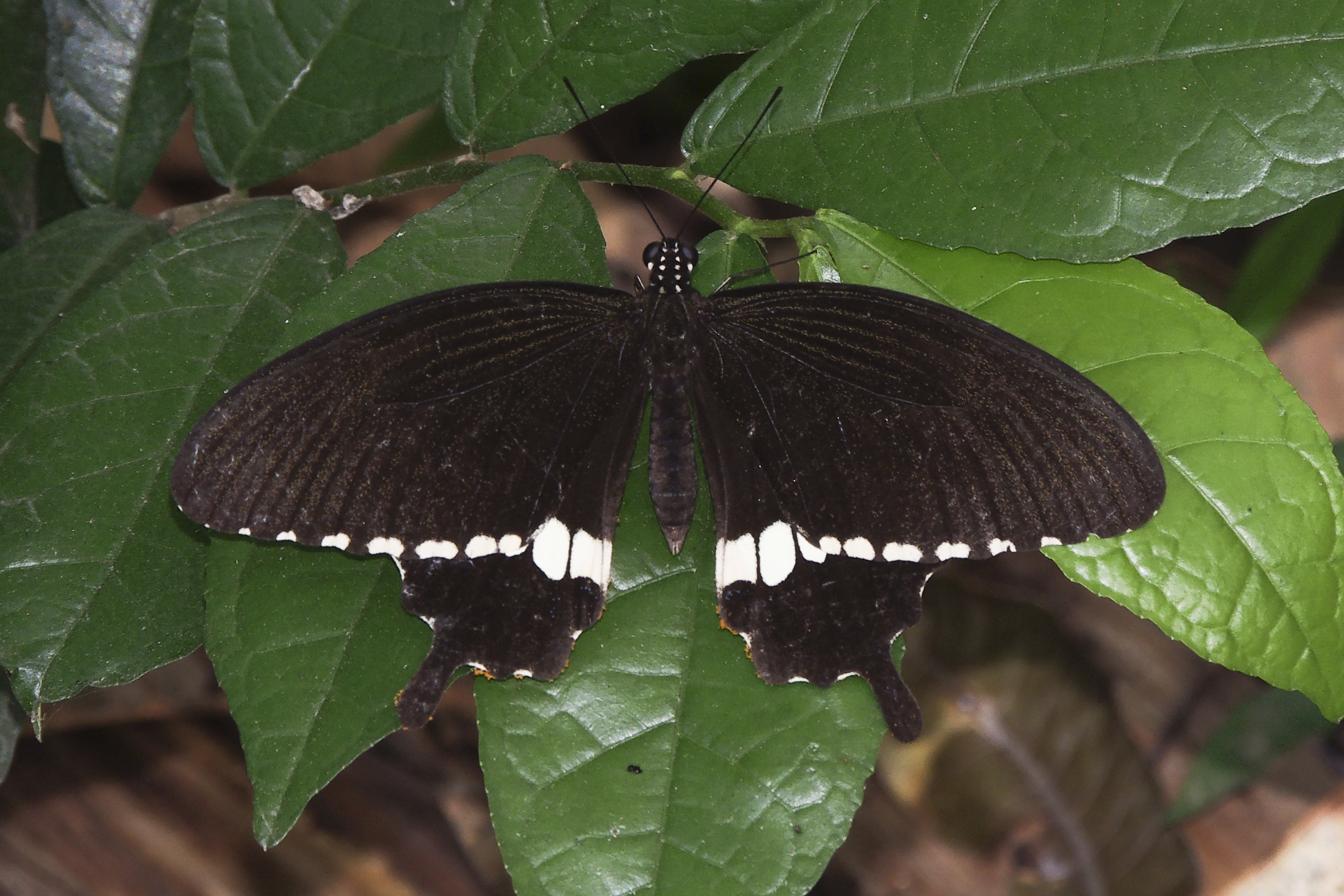
Dorsal view (male)

===== Species: Papilio protenor (spangle) =====
Subspecies: Papilio protenor euprotenor (Himalayan spangle)

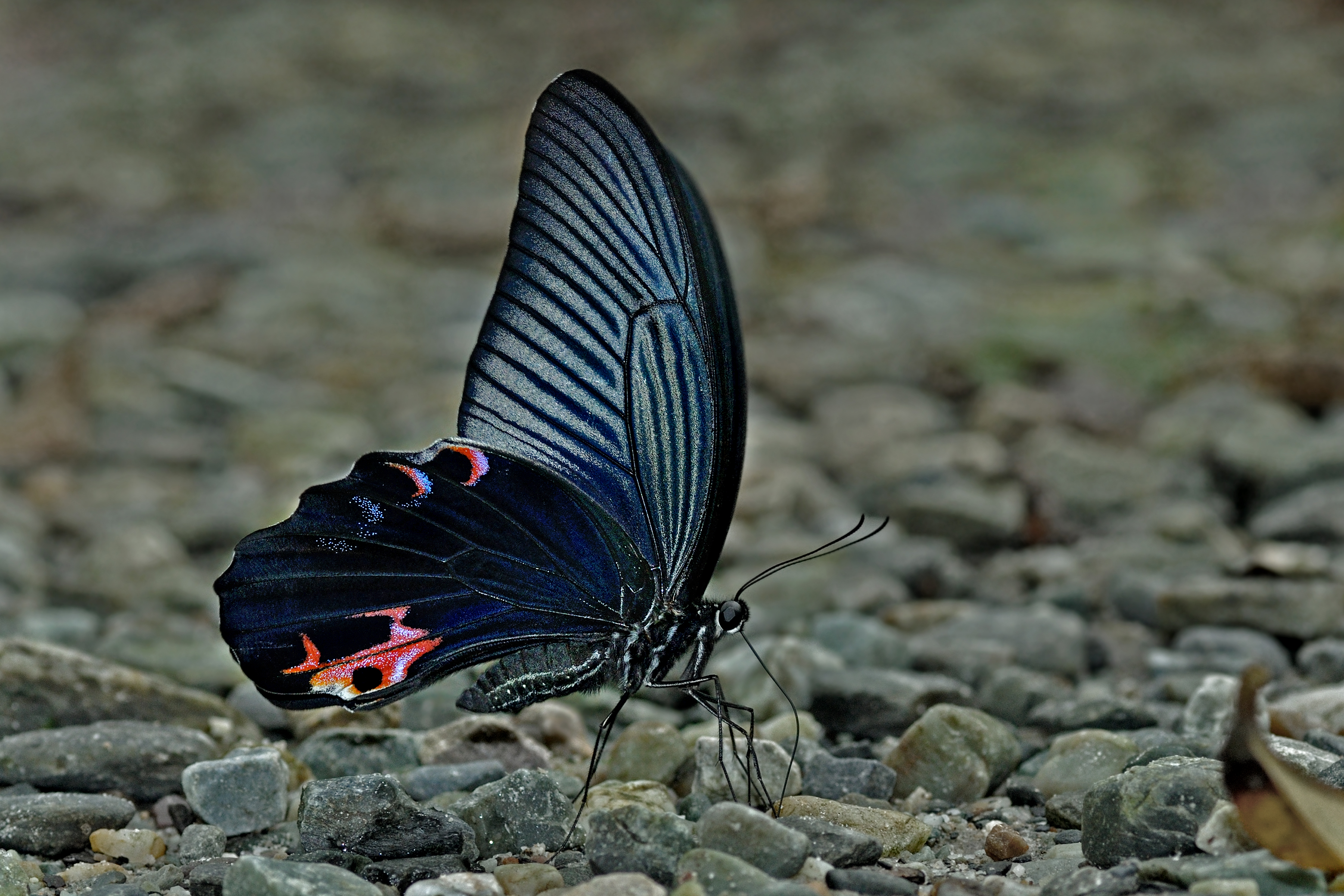
Ventral view

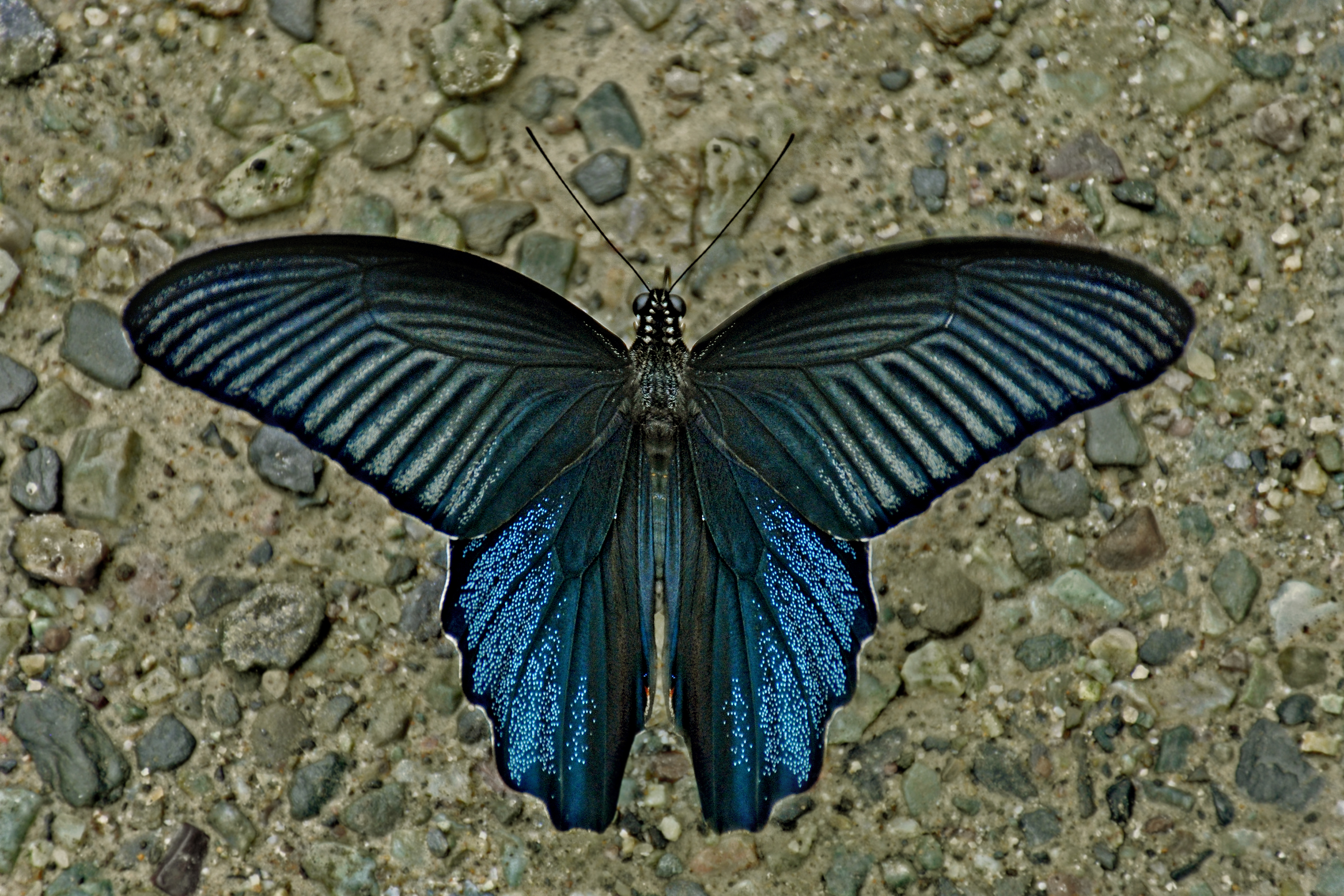
Dorsal view

Tribe: Teinopalpini

==== Genus: Meandrusa ====
===== Species: Meandrusa payeni (yellow gorgon) =====
Subspecies: Meandrusa payeni evan (Sikkim yellow gorgon)

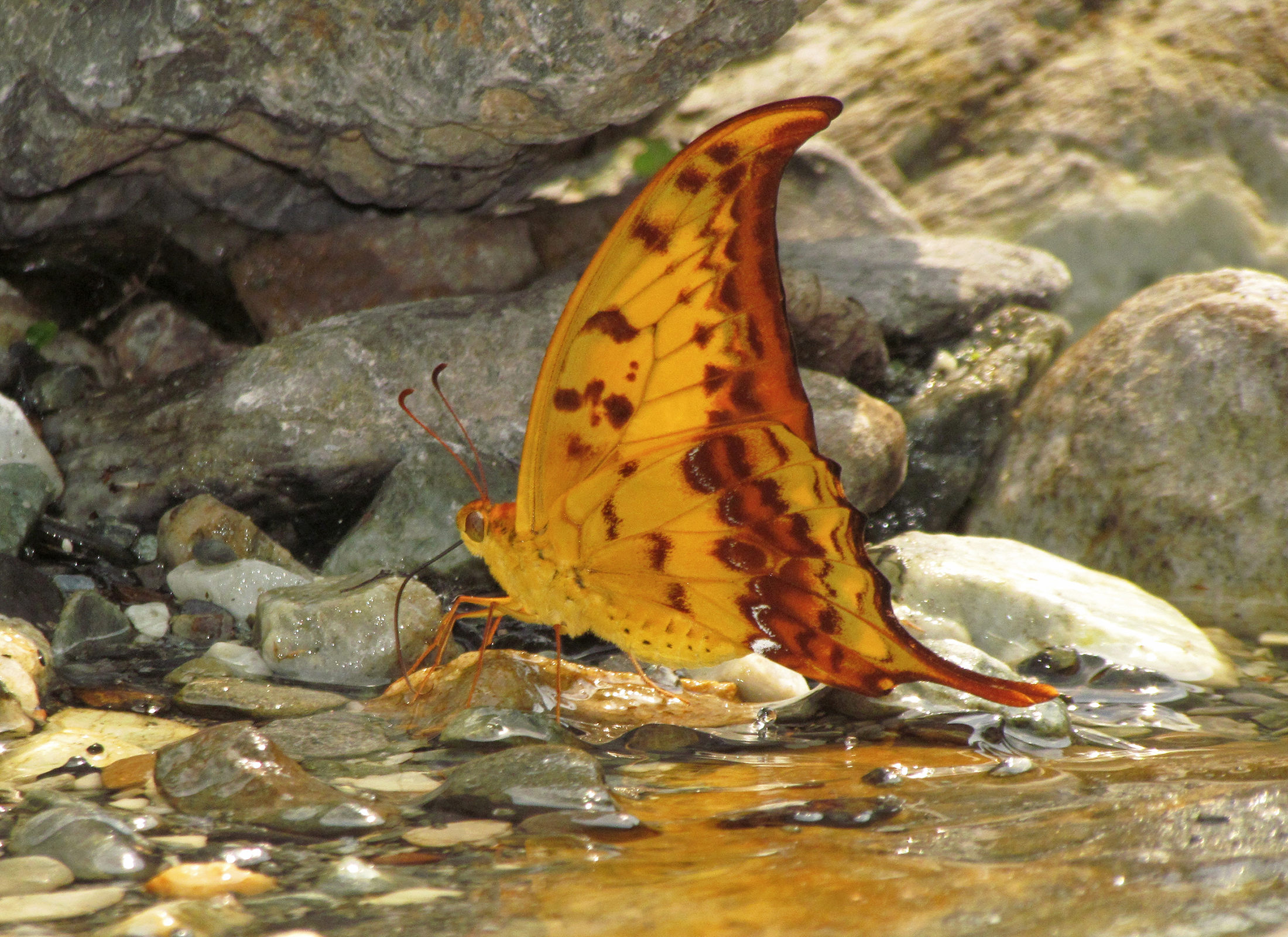
Ventral view

Tribe: Troidini

==== Genus: Atrophaneura ====
===== Species: Atrophaneura polyeuctes (common windmill) =====
Subspecies: Atrophaneura polyeuctes polyeuctes (Sylhet common windmill)

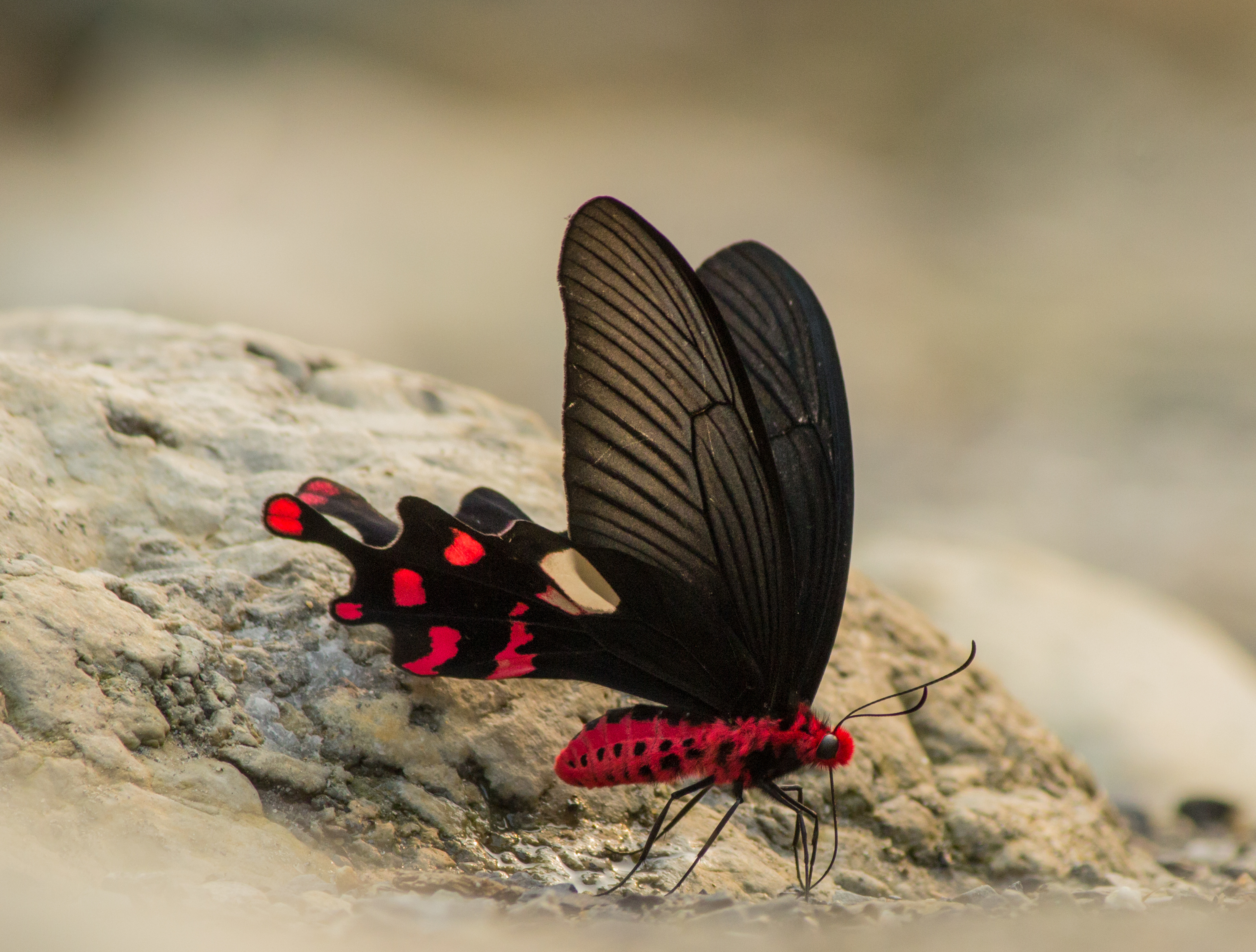
Ventral view

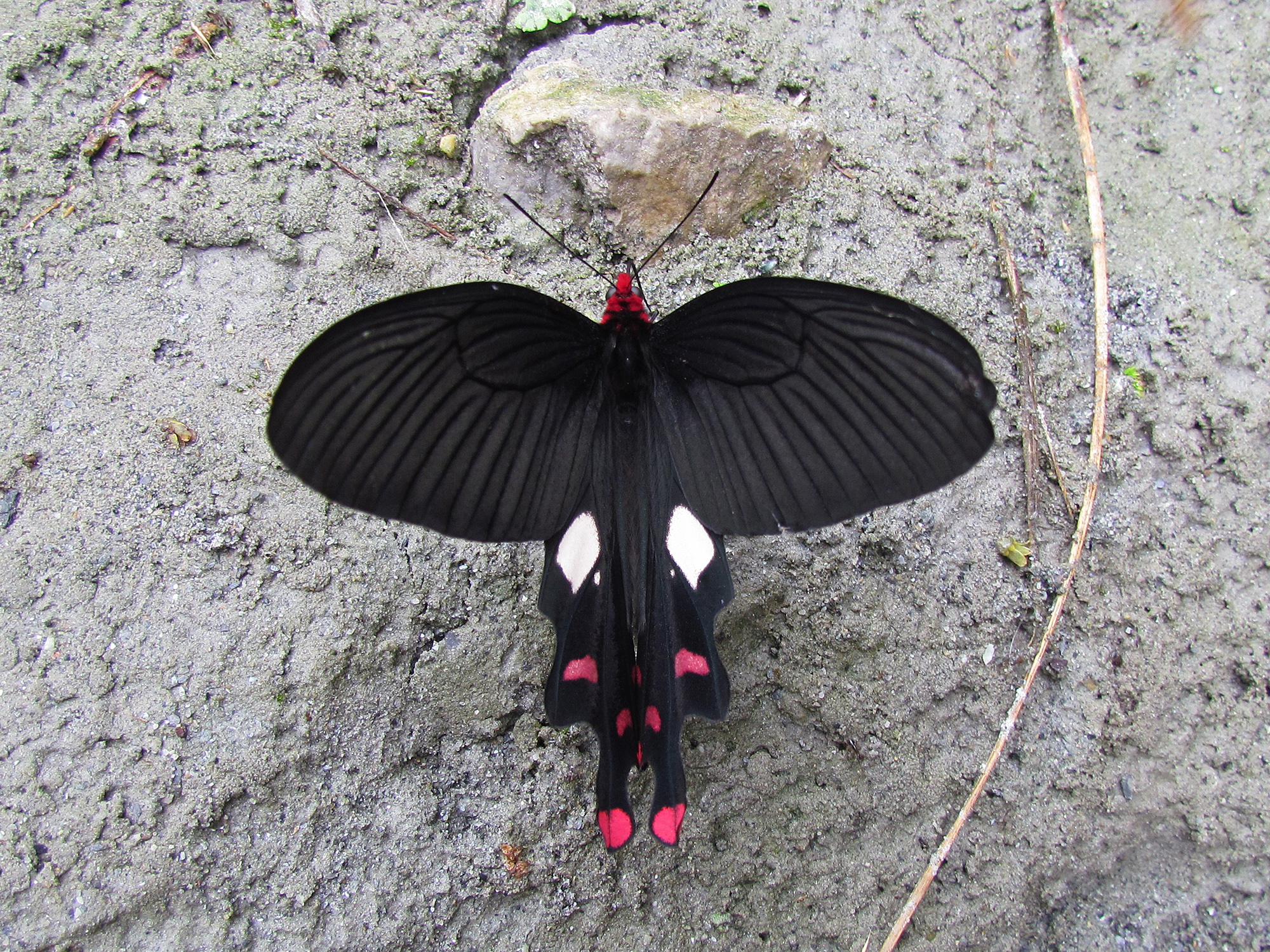
Dorsal view

==== Genus: Pachliopta ====
===== Species: Pachliopta aristolochiae (common rose) =====
Subspecies: Pachliopta aristolochiae aristolochiae (Indian common rose)

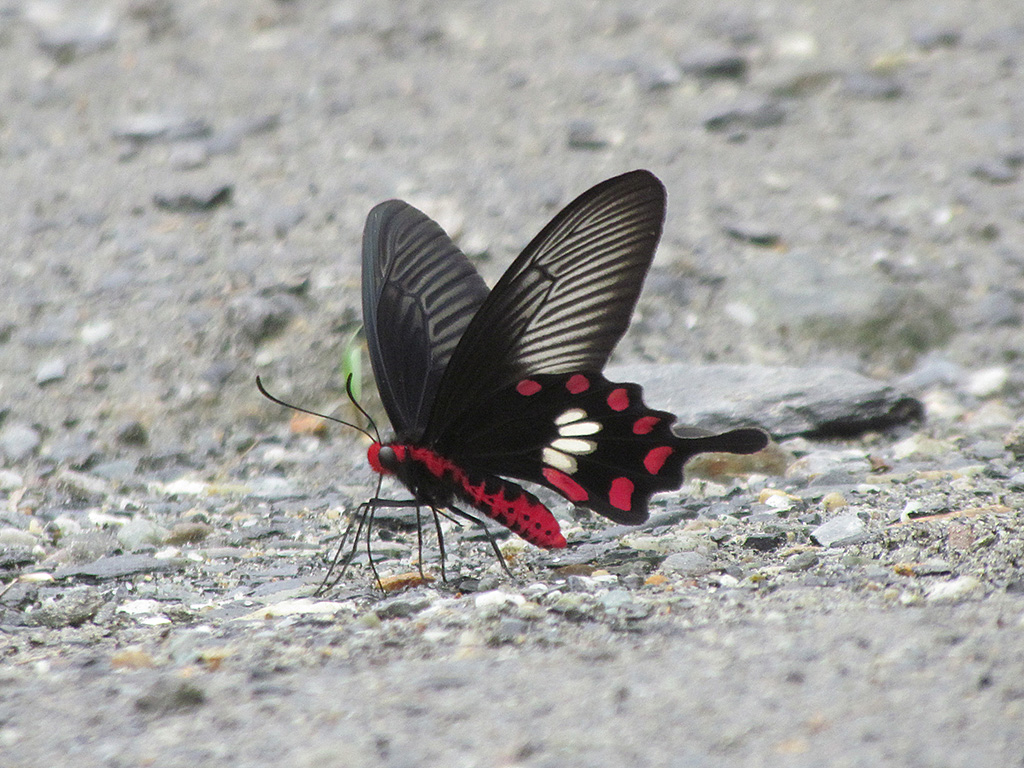
Ventral view

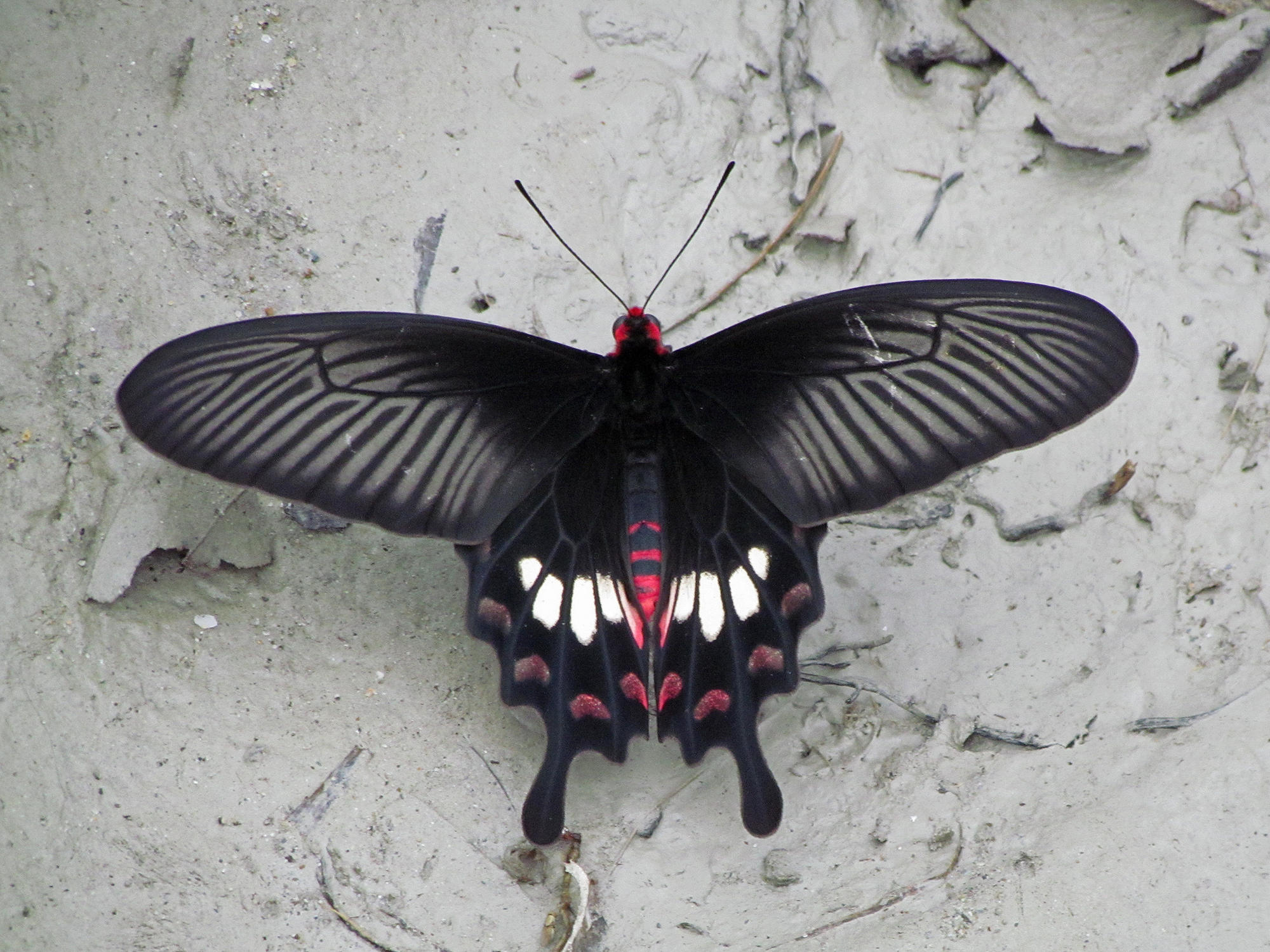
Dorsal view

==== Genus: Troides ====
===== Species: Troides helena (common birdwing) =====
Subspecies: Troides helena cerberus (Khasi common birdwing)

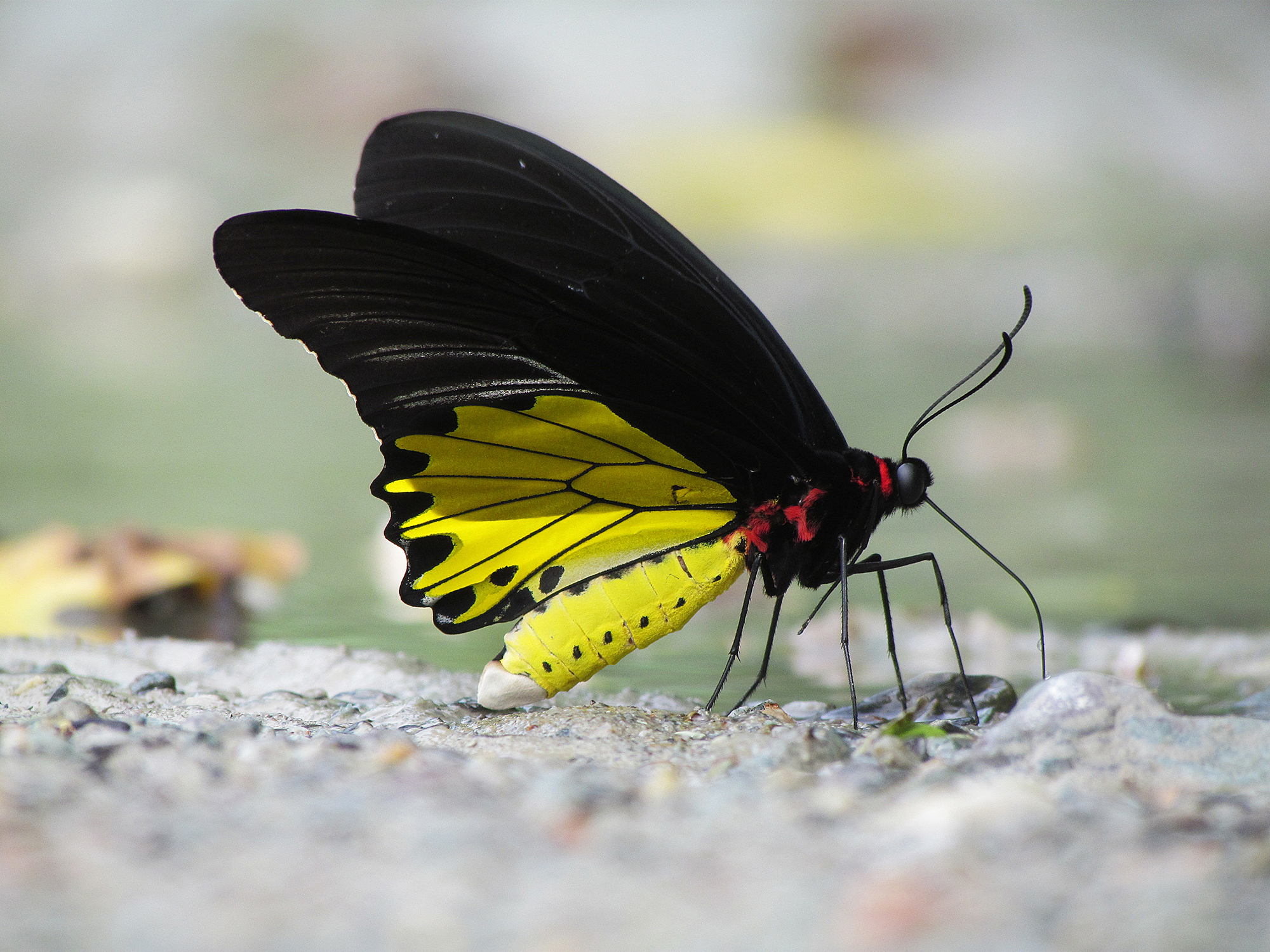
Ventral view

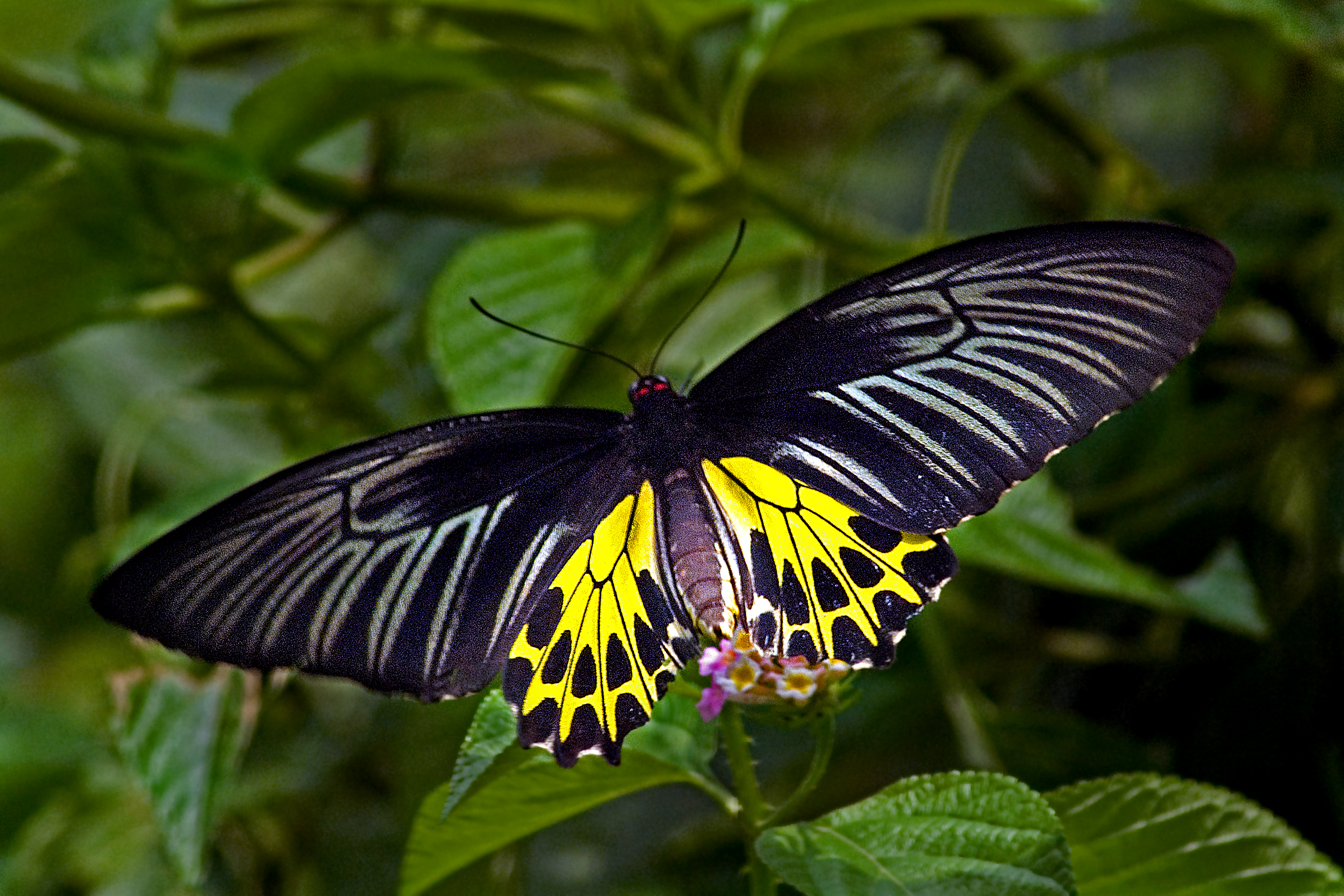
Dorsal view

== Family: Pieridae ==
=== Subfamily: Coliadinae ===
==== Genus: Catopsilia (emigrants) ====
===== Species: Catopsilia pomona (lemon emigrant or common emigrant) =====
Subspecies: Catopsilia pomona pomona (Oriental lemon emigrant)

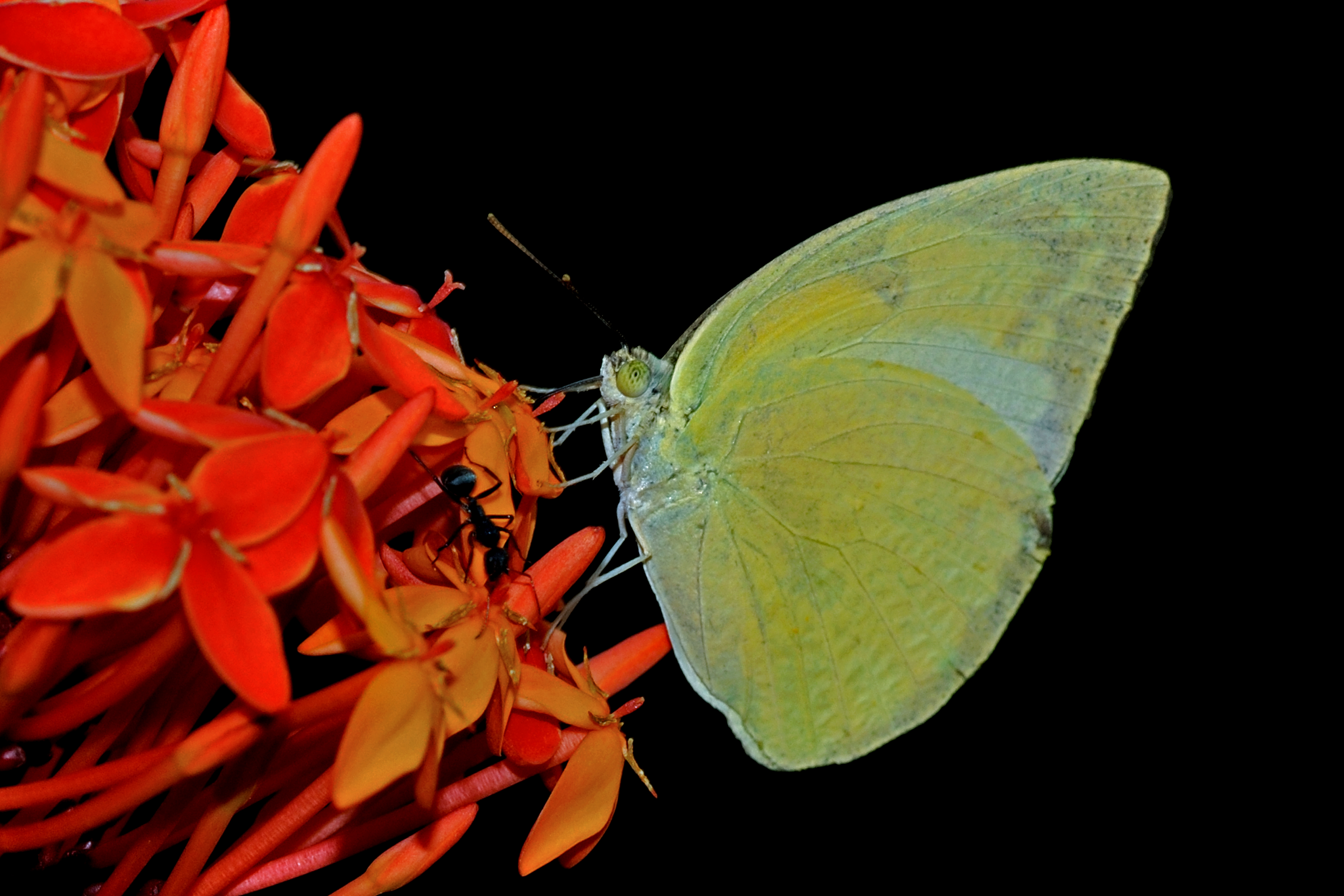
Ventral view

===== Species: Catopsilia pyranthe (mottled emigrant) =====
Subspecies: Catopsilia pyranthe pyranthe (Oriental mottled emigrant)

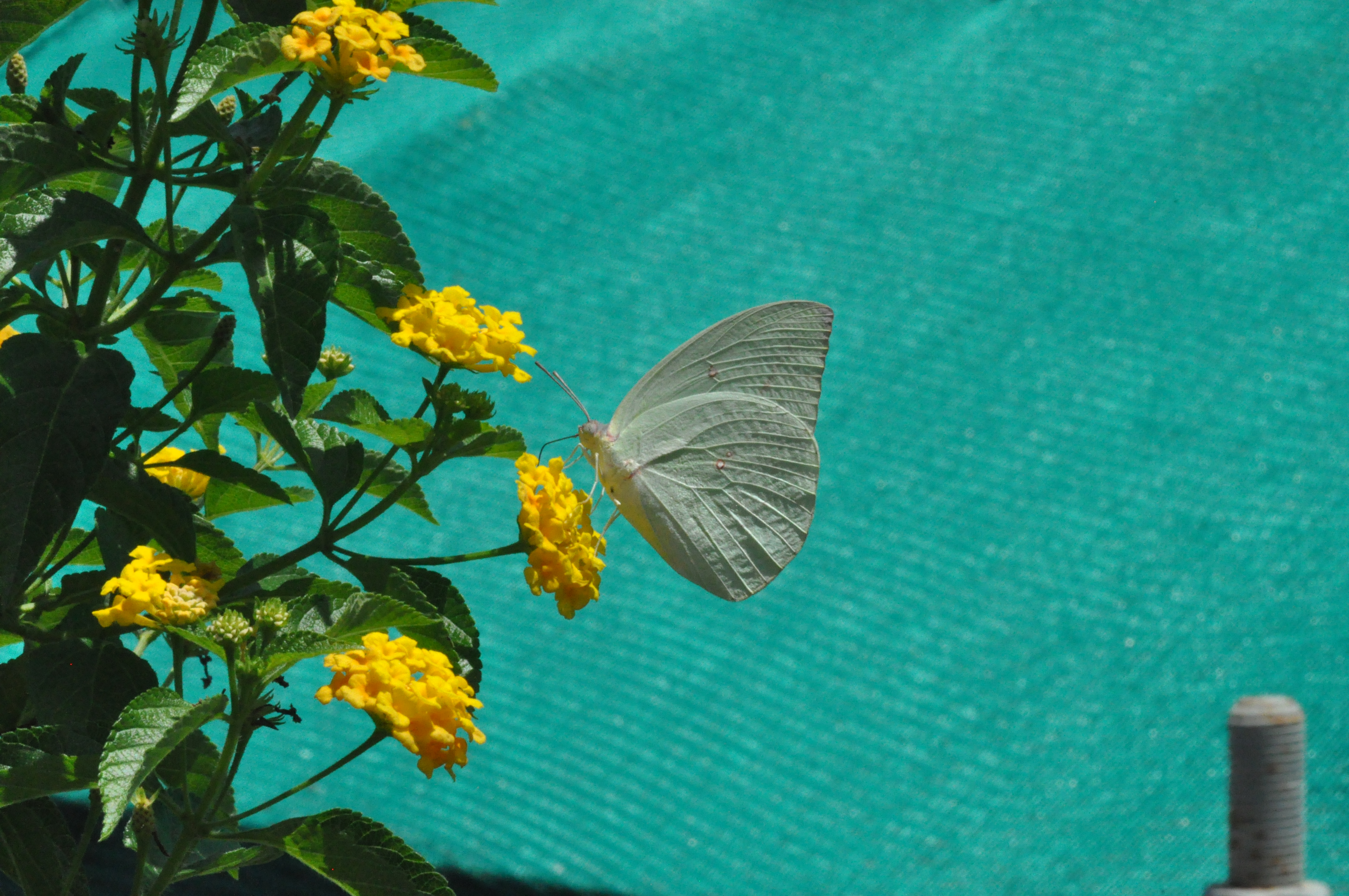
Ventral view

==== Genus: Eurema (grass yellows) ====
===== Species: Eurema andersonii (one-spot grass yellow) =====
Subspecies: Eurema andersonii jordani (Sikkim one-spot grass yellow or Jordan's grass yellow)

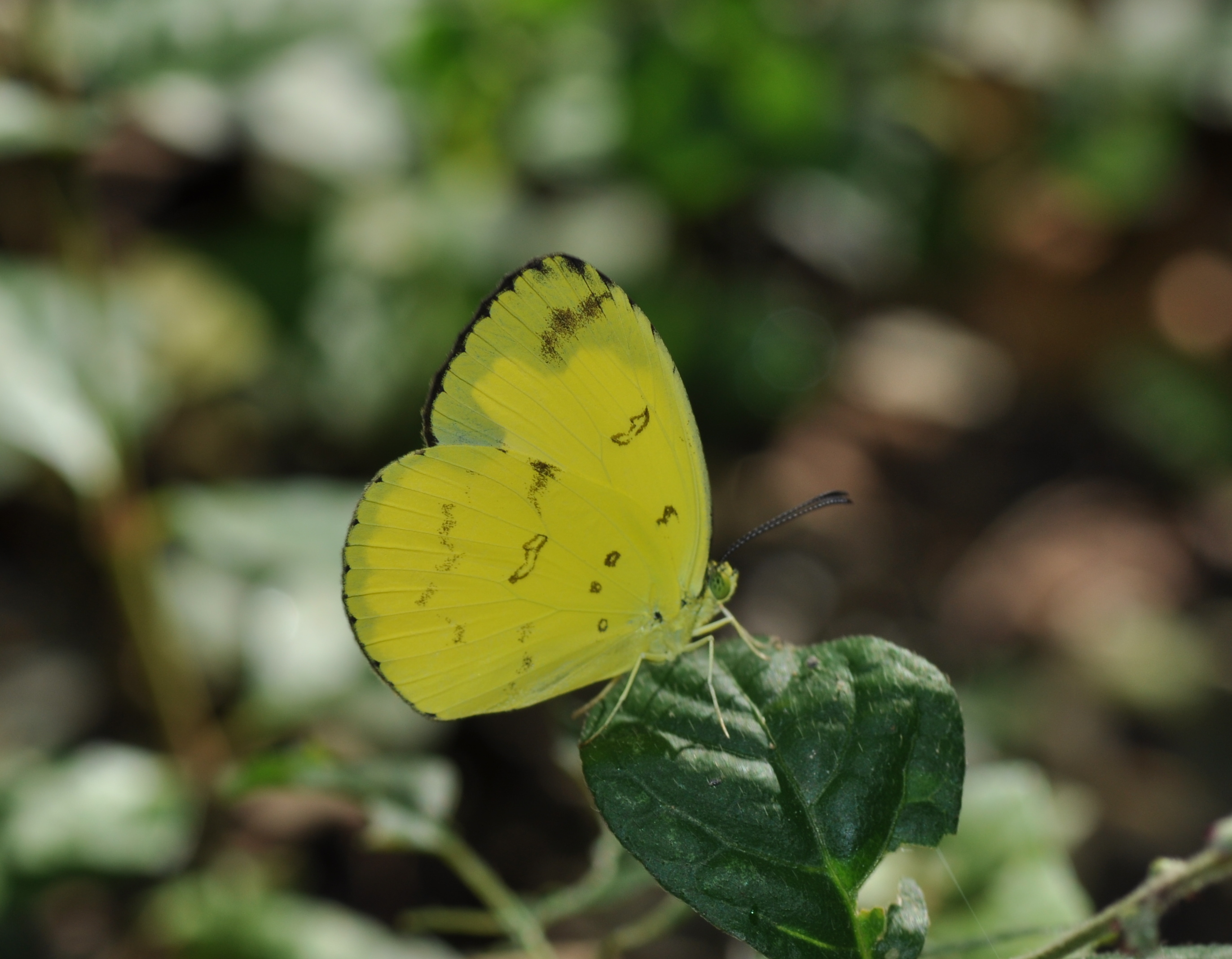
Ventral view

===== Species: Eurema hecabe (common grass yellow) =====
Subspecies: Eurema hecabe hecabe (Oriental common grass yellow)

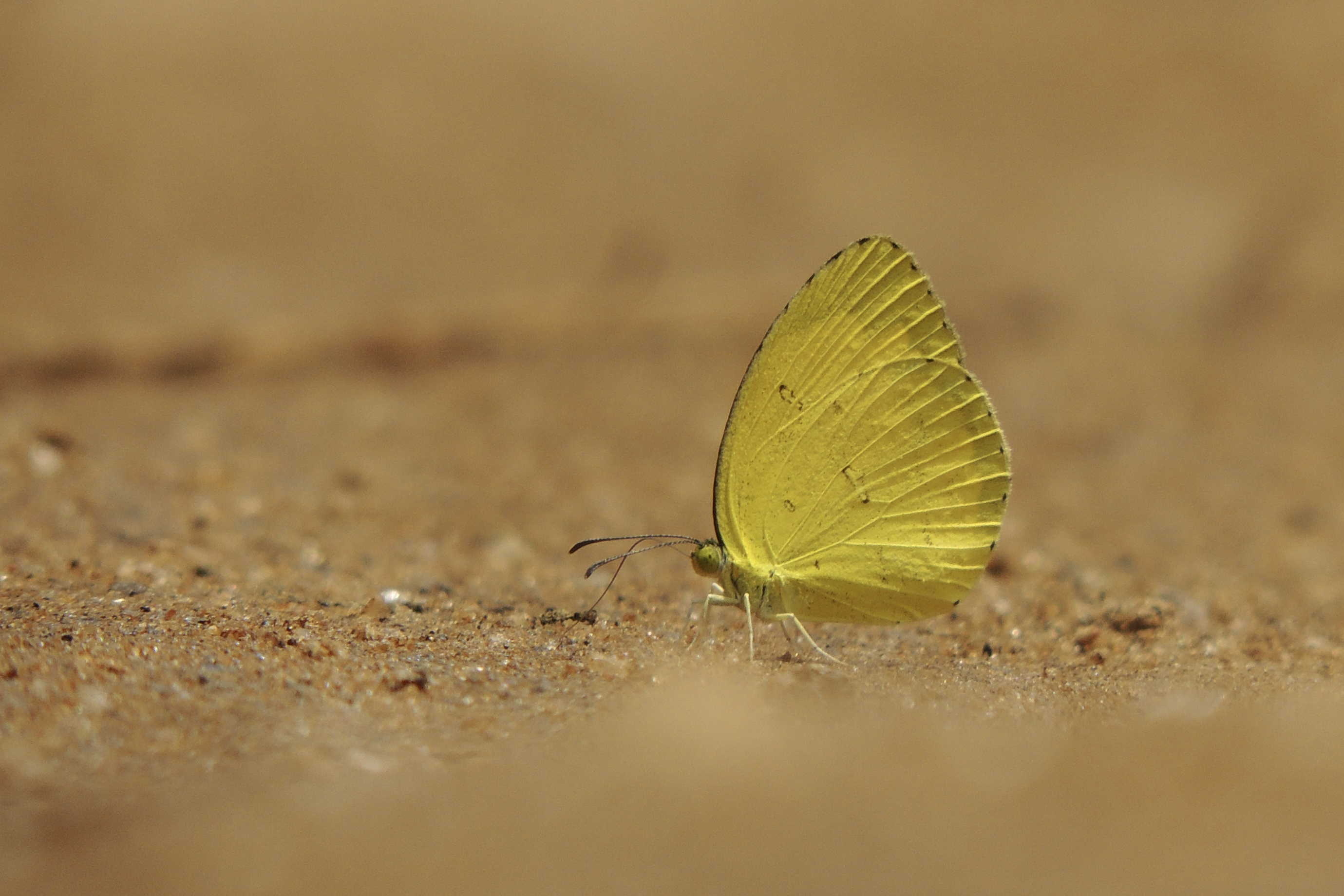
Ventral view

==== Genus: Gandaca ====
===== Species: Gandaca harina (tree yellow) =====
Subspecies: Gandaca harina assamica (Assam tree yellow)

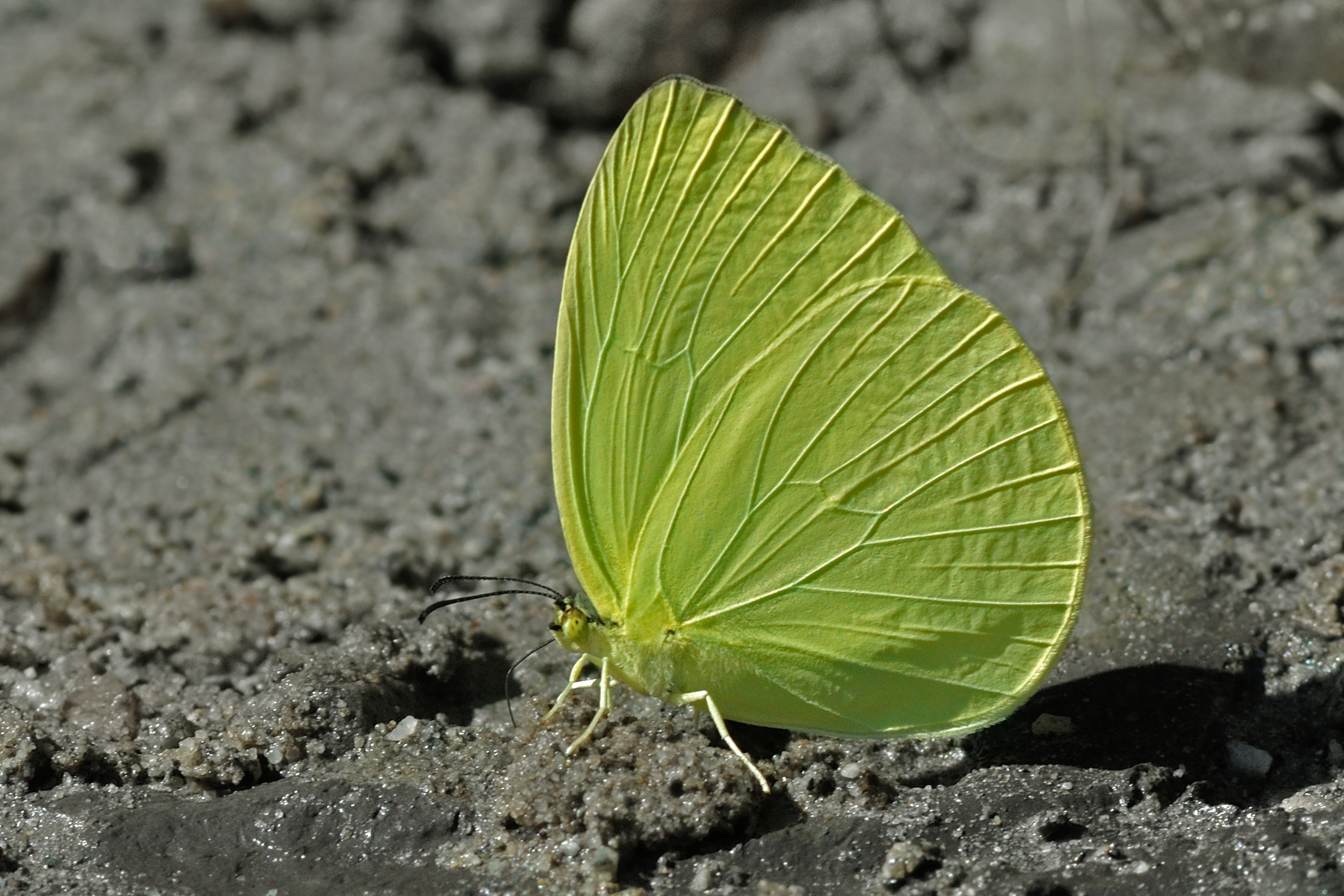
Ventral view

=== Subfamily: Pierinae ===
Tribe: Anthocharidini

==== Genus: Hebomoia ====
===== Species: Hebomoia glaucippe (great orange-tip) =====
Subspecies: Hebomoia glaucippe glaucippe (Oriental great orange-tip)

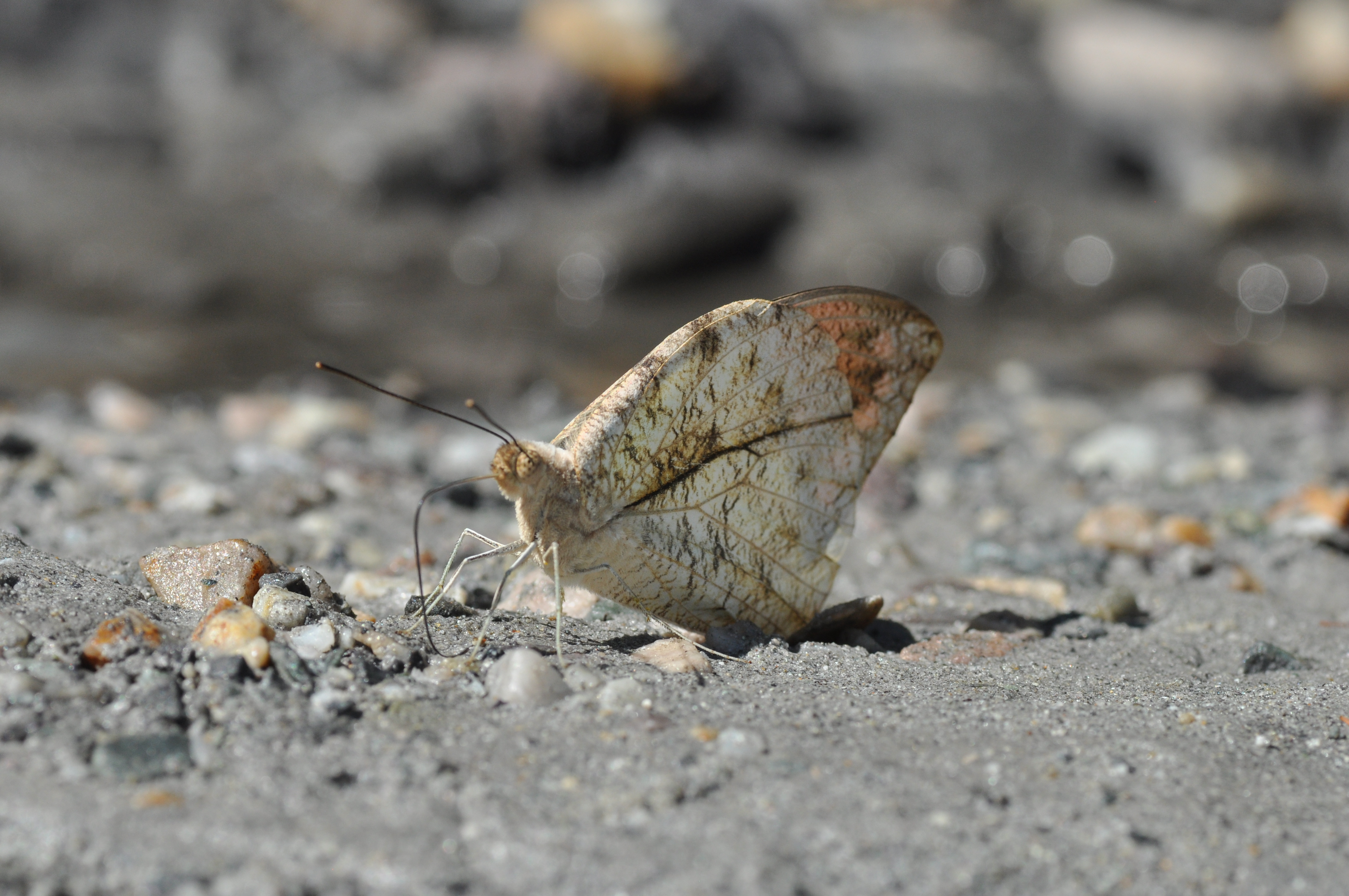
Ventral view

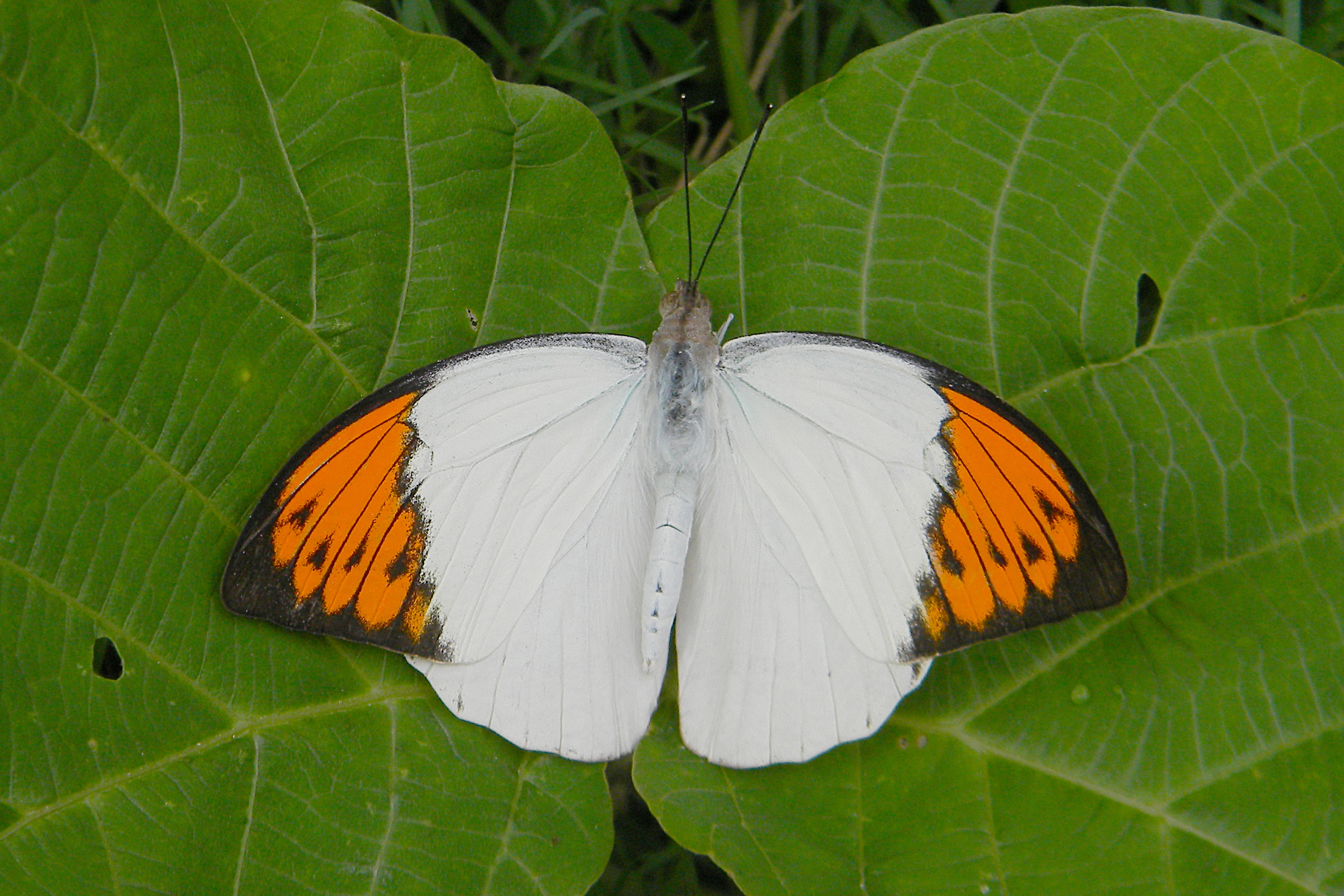
Dorsal view

Tribe: Leptosiaini

==== Genus: Leptosia ====
===== Species: Leptosia nina (psyche) =====
Subspecies: Leptosia nina nina (Oriental psyche)

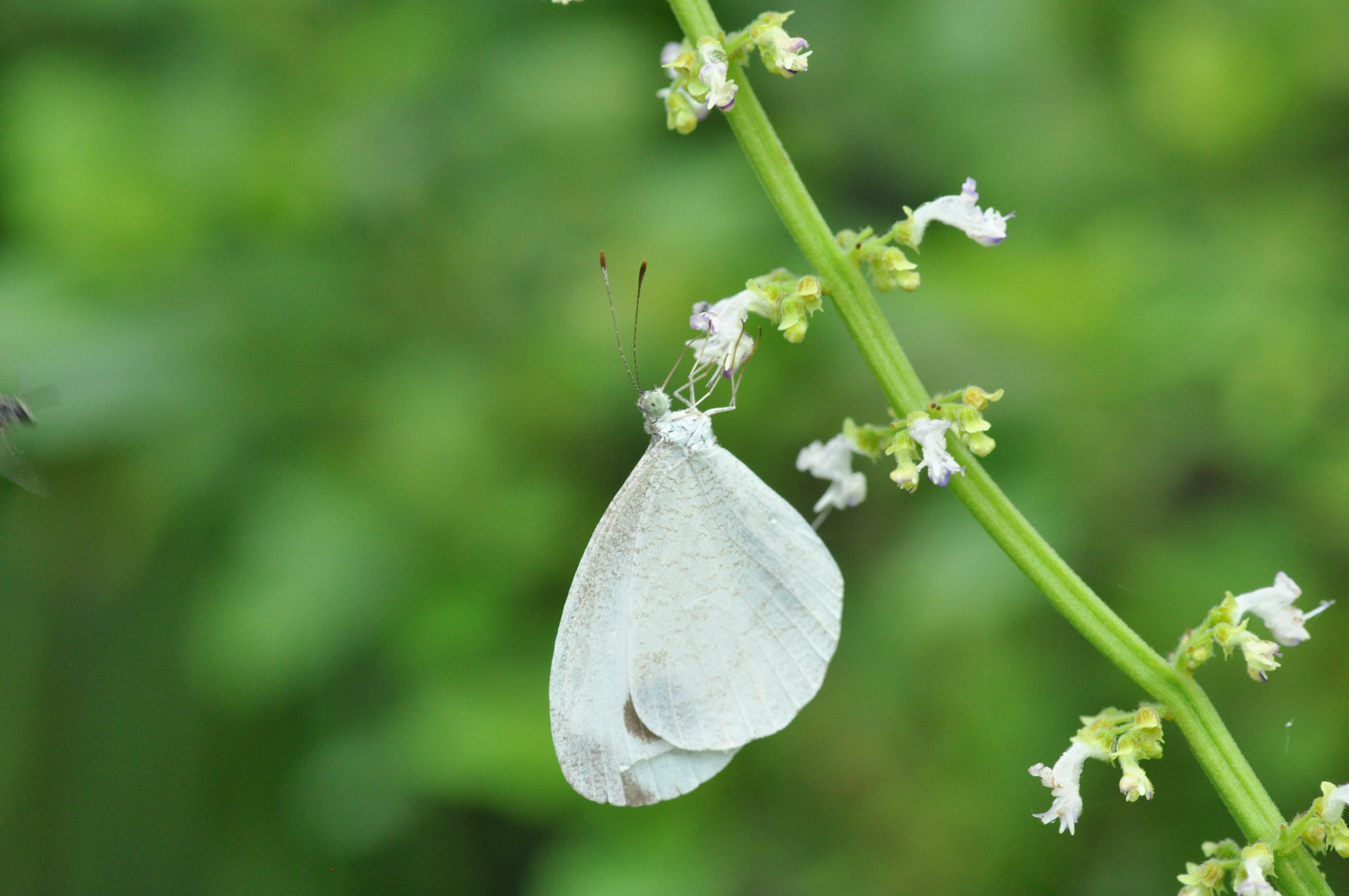
Ventral view

Tribe: Pierini

==== Genus: Appias ====
===== Species: Appias albina (common albatross) =====
Subspecies: Appias albina darada (Sylhet common albatross)

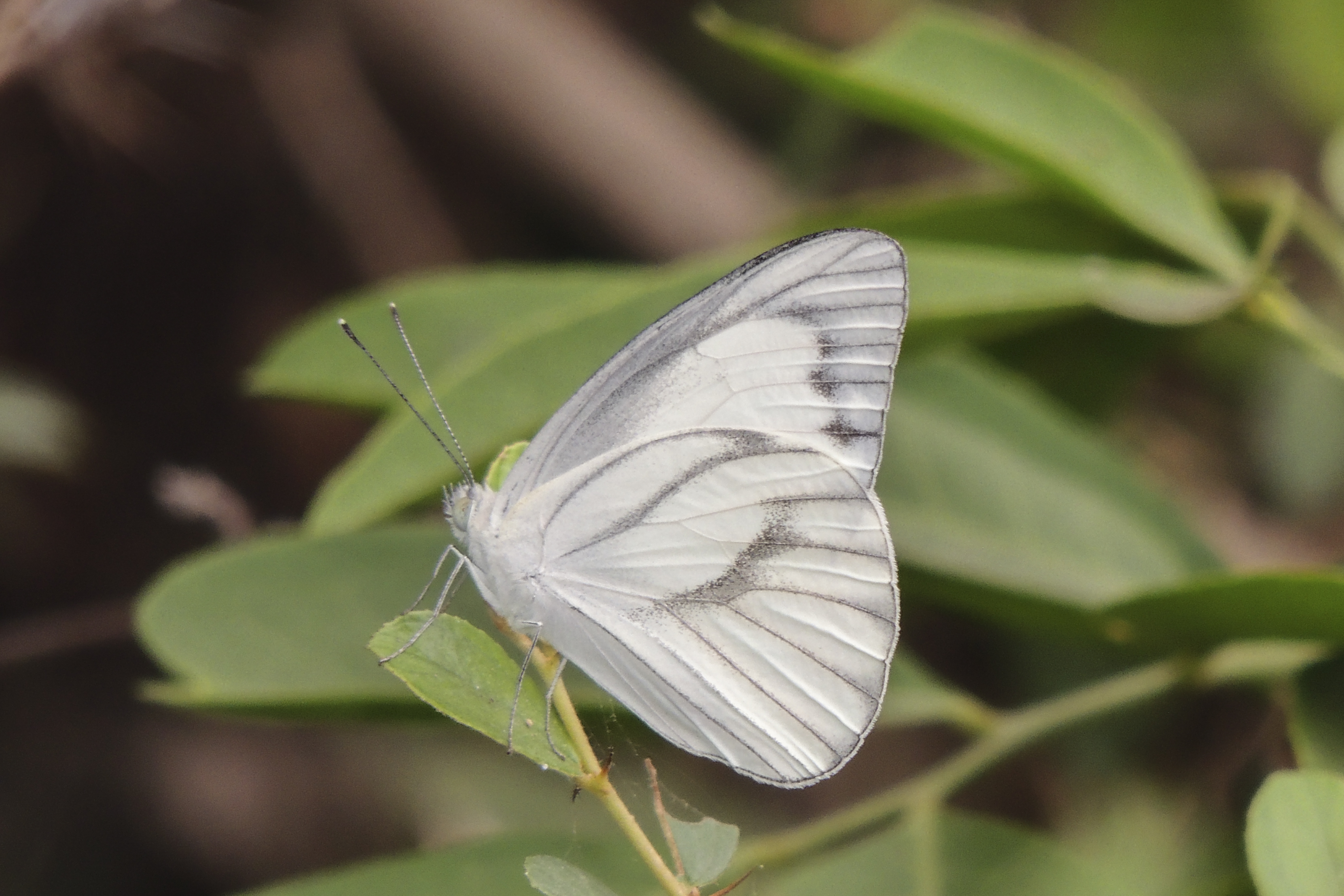
Ventral view

===== Species: Appias lalage (spot puffin) =====
Subspecies: Appias lalage lalage (Himalayan spot puffin)

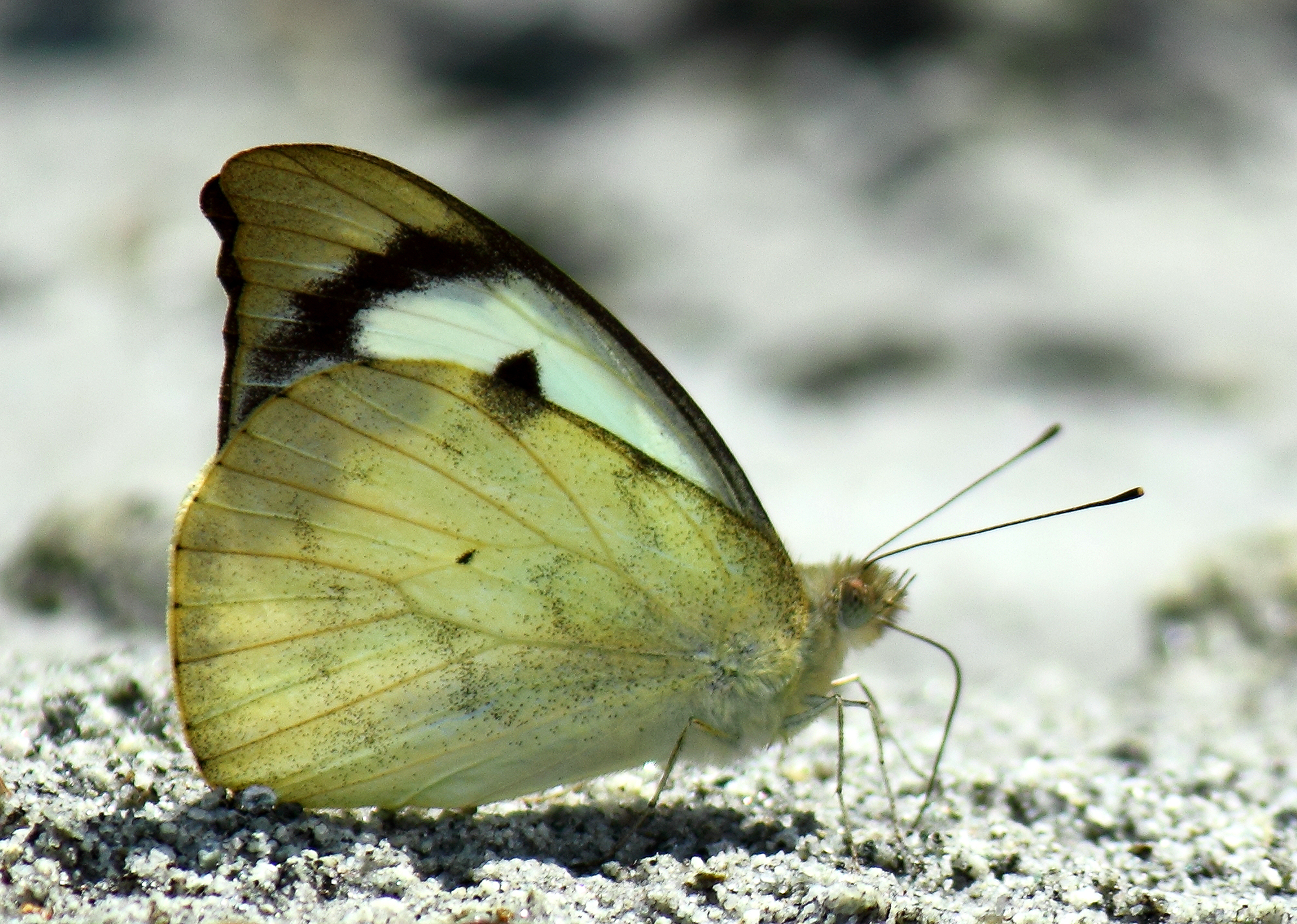
Ventral view

===== Species: Appias libythea (western striped albatross) =====
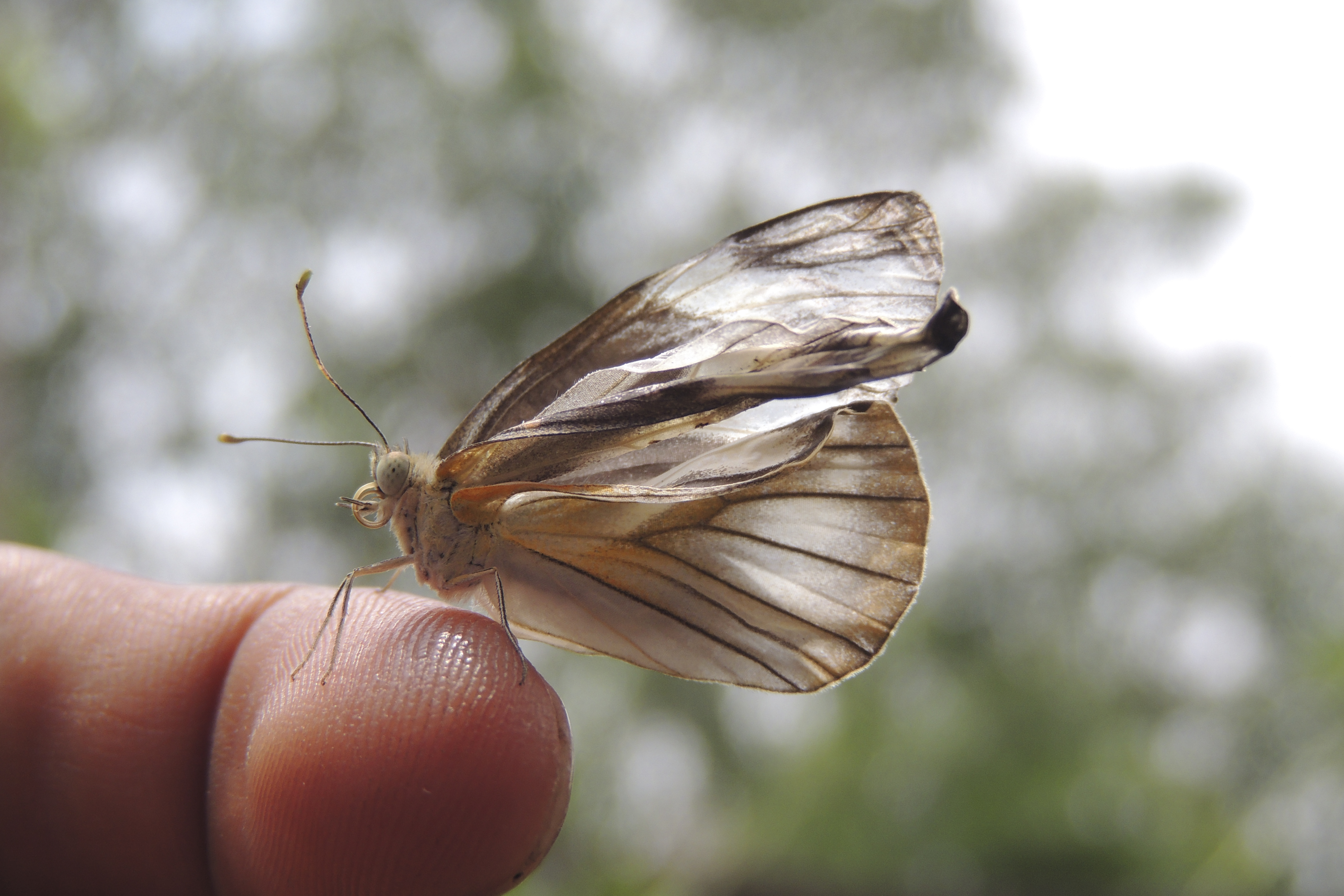
Ventral view

===== Species: Appias lyncida (chocolate albatross) =====
Subspecies: Appias lyncida eleonora (Indo-Chinese chocolate albatross)

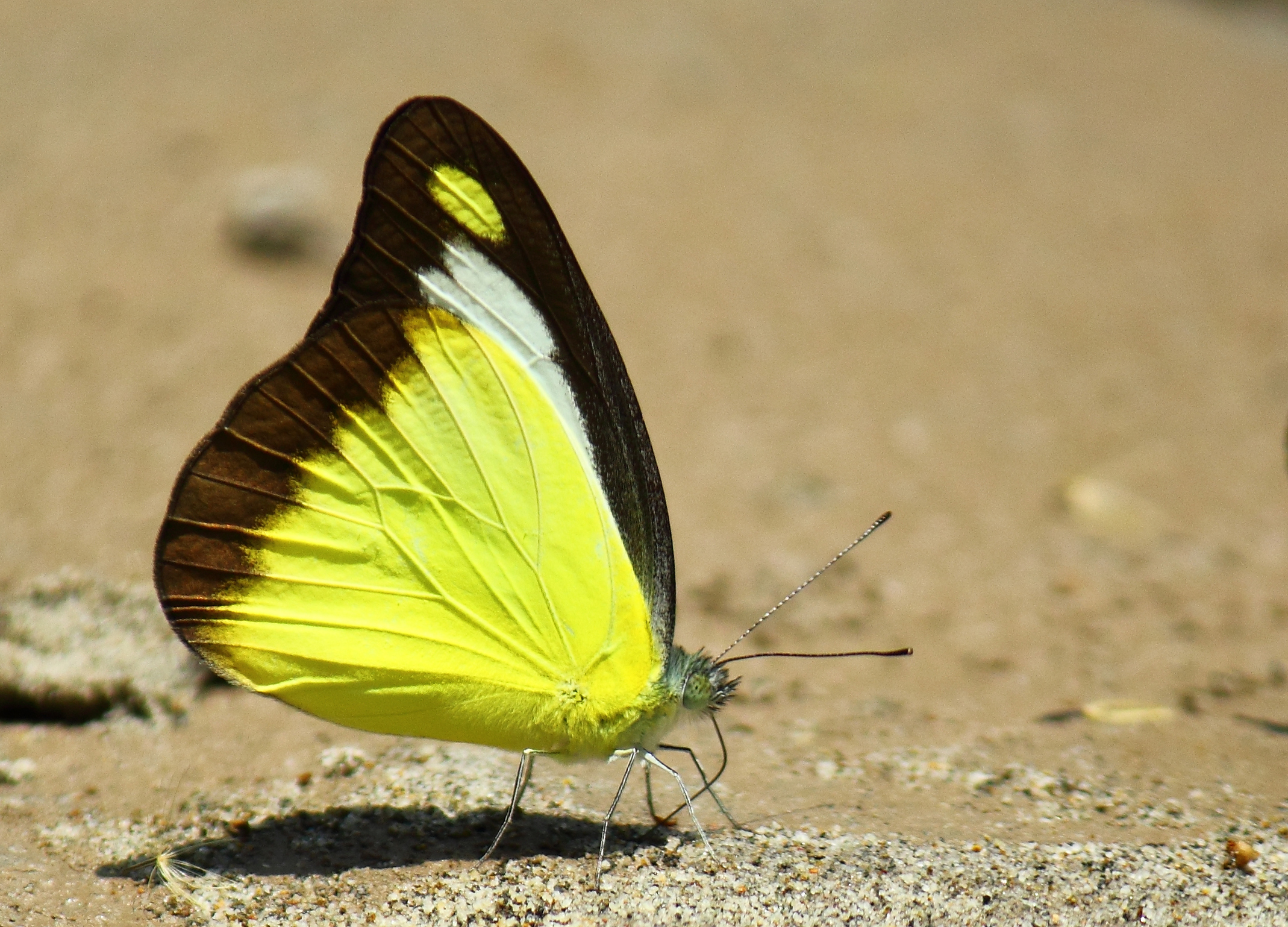
Ventral view (male)

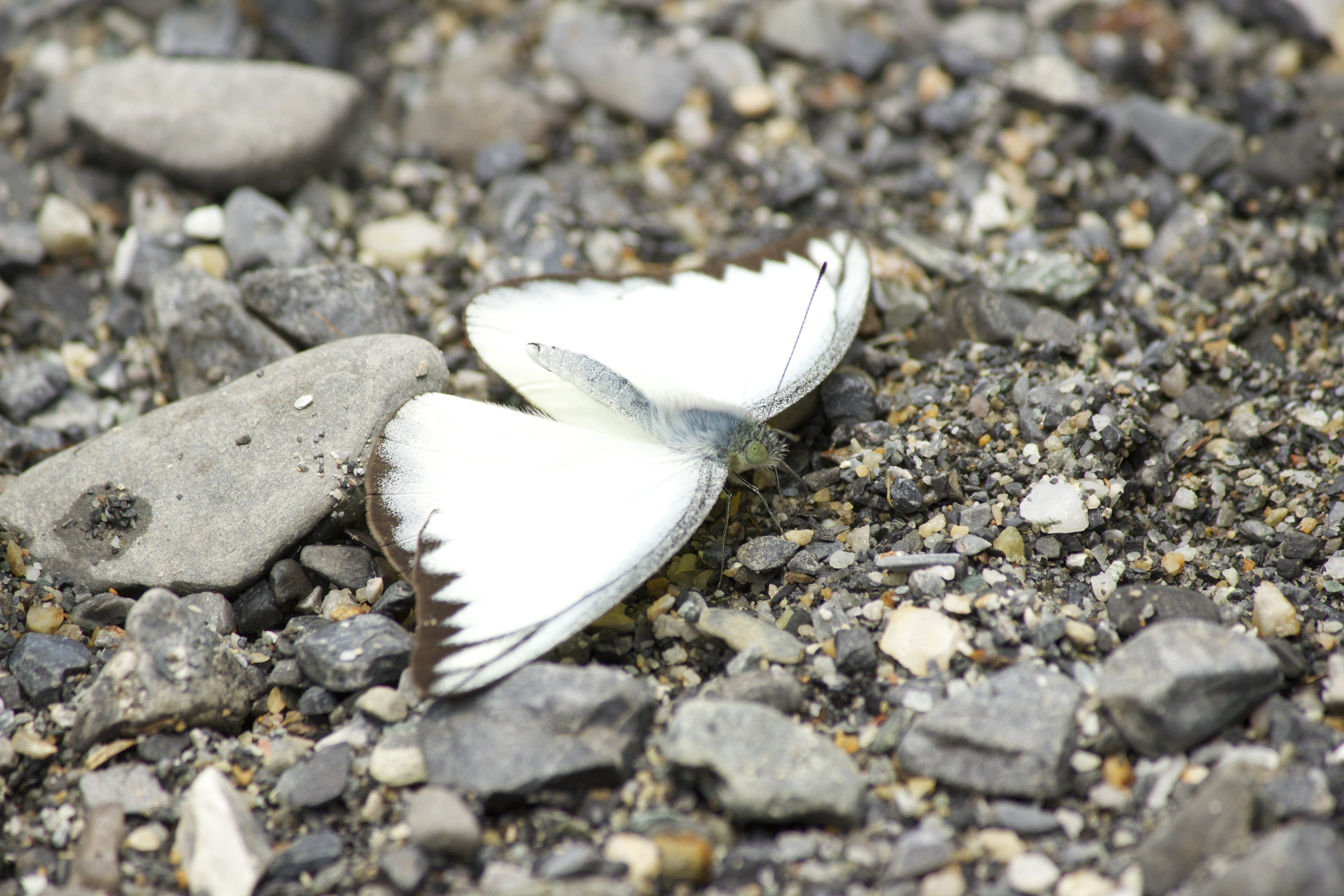
Dorsal view (male)

==== Genus: Delias (Jezebels) ====
===== Species: Delias acalis (redbreast Jezebel) =====
Subspecies: Delias acalis pyramus (Himalayan redbreast Jezebel)

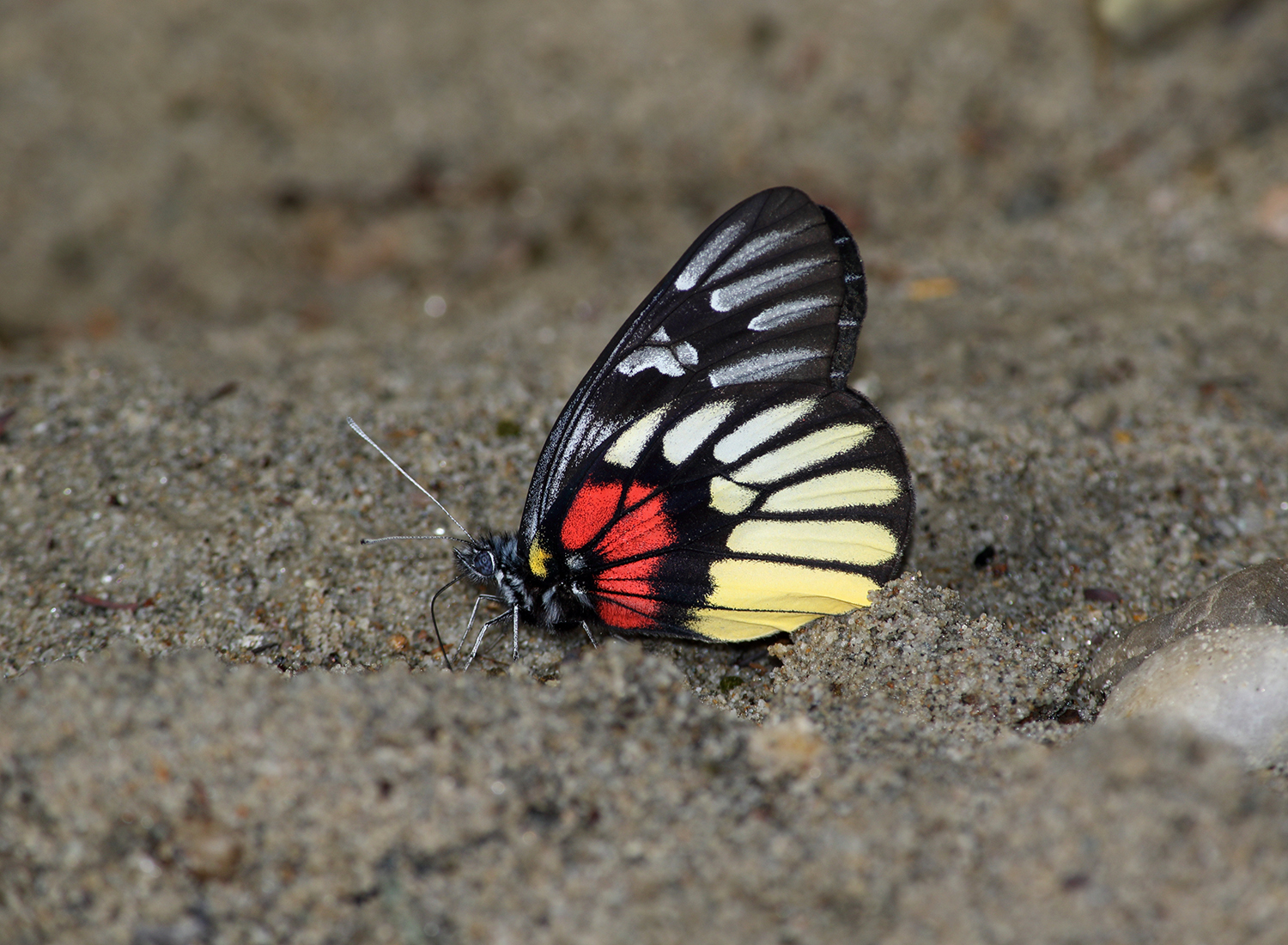
Ventral view

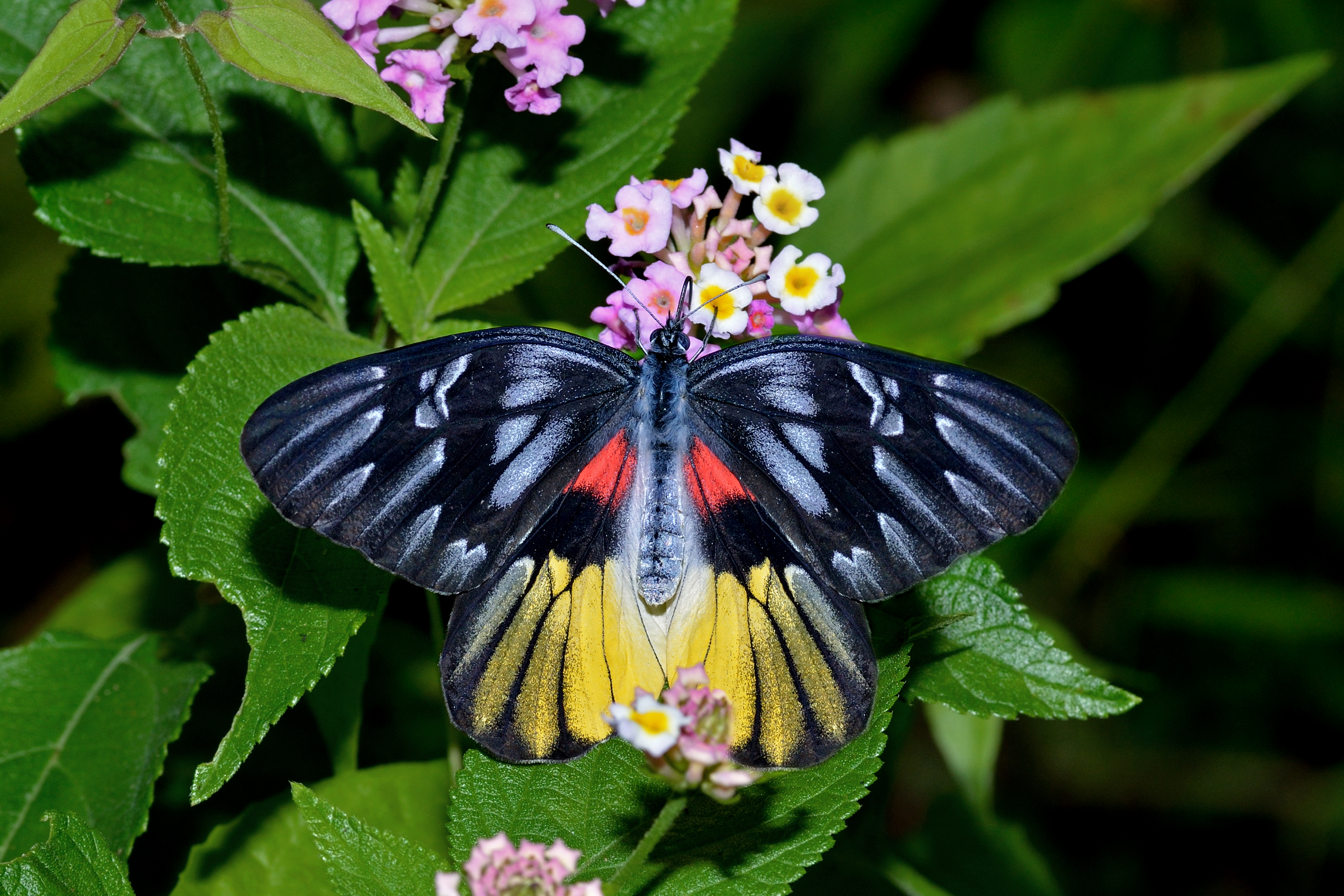
Dorsal view

===== Species: Delias agostina (yellow Jezebel) =====
Subspecies: Delias agostina agostina (Sikkim yellow Jezebel)

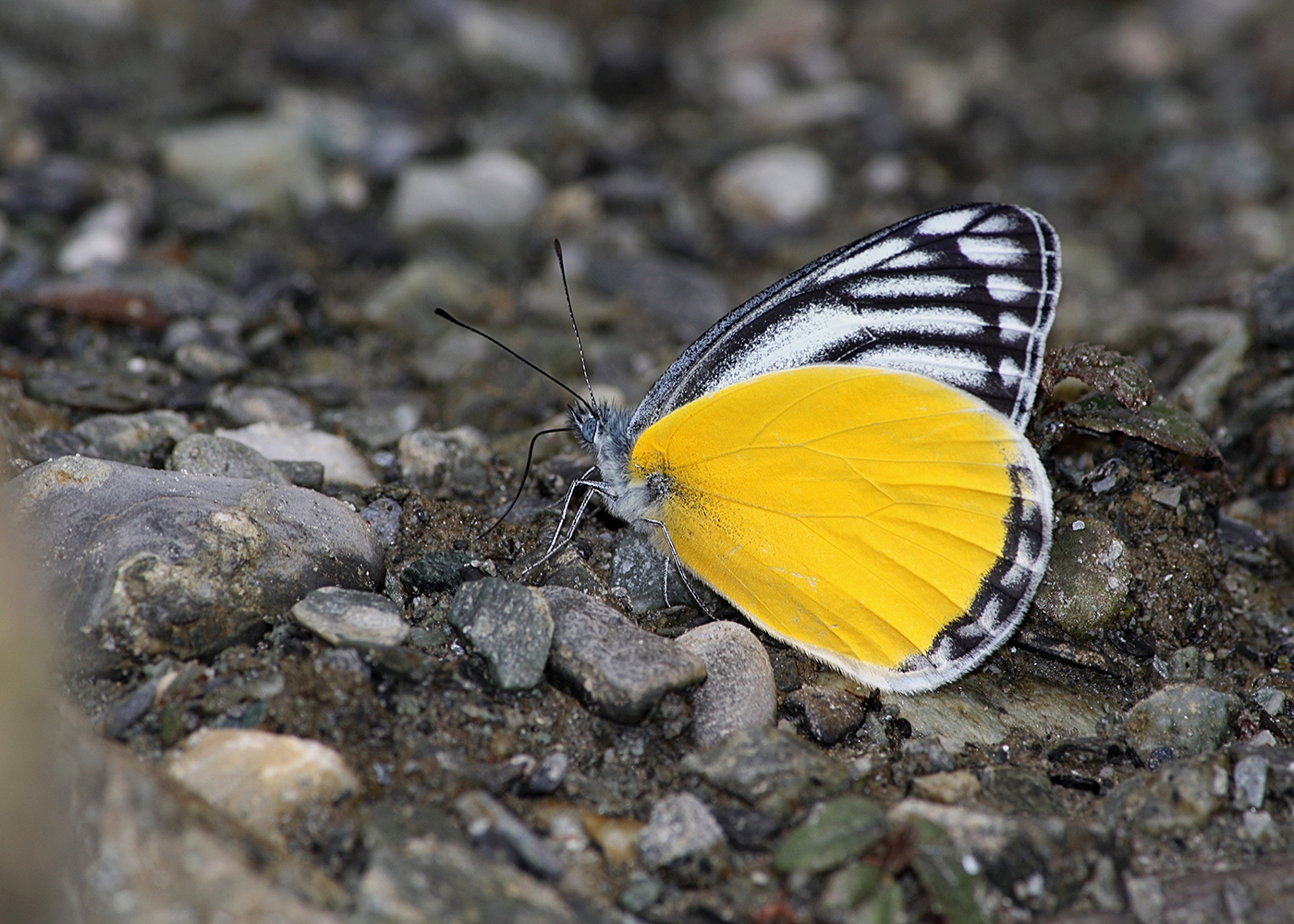
Ventral view

===== Species: Delias belladonna (hill Jezebel) =====
Subspecies: Delias belladonna ithiela (Sikkim hill Jezebel)

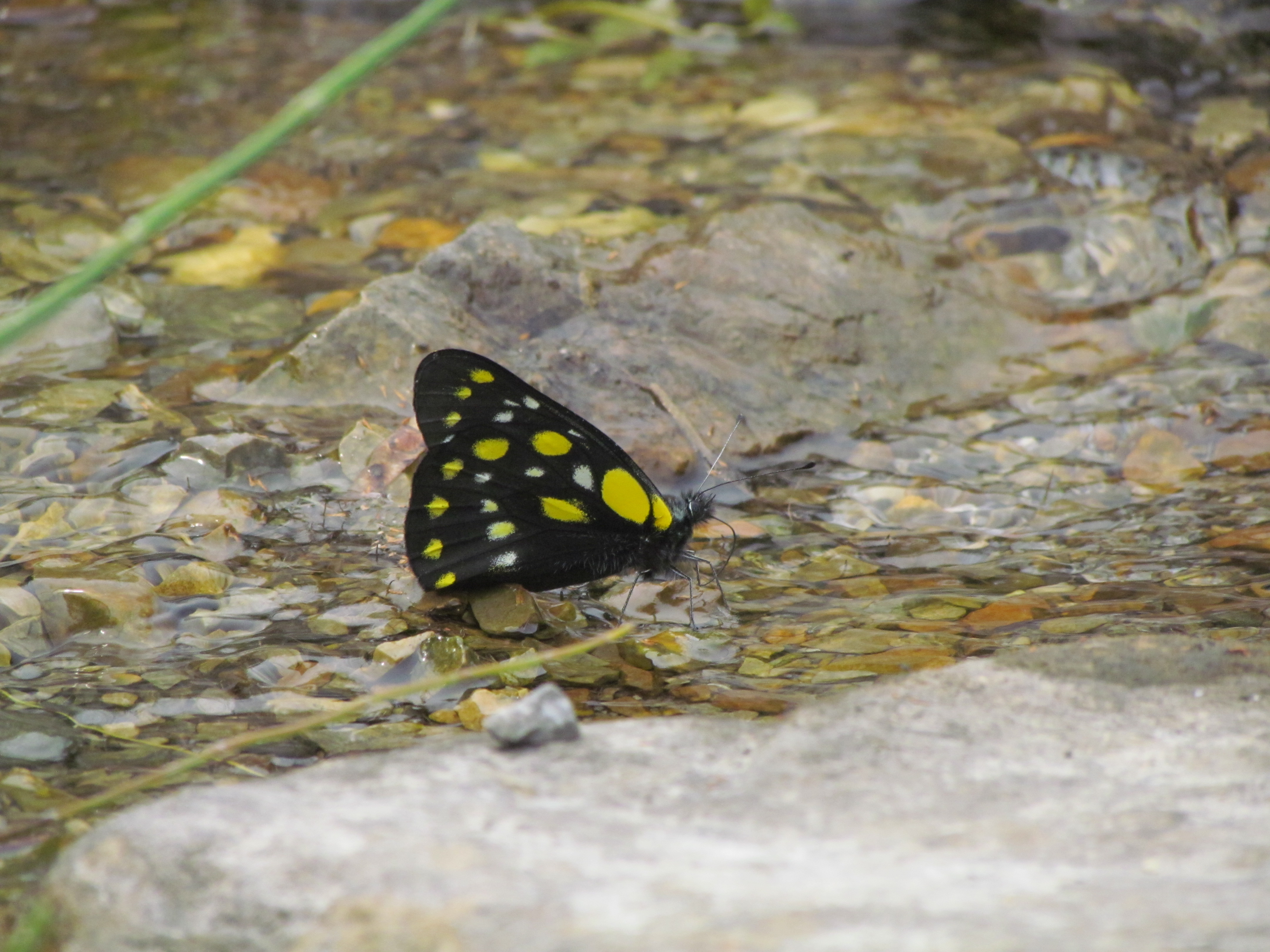
Ventral view

===== Species: Delias descombesi (red-spot Jezebel) =====
Subspecies: Delias descombesi descombesi (Vietnamese red-spot Jezebel)

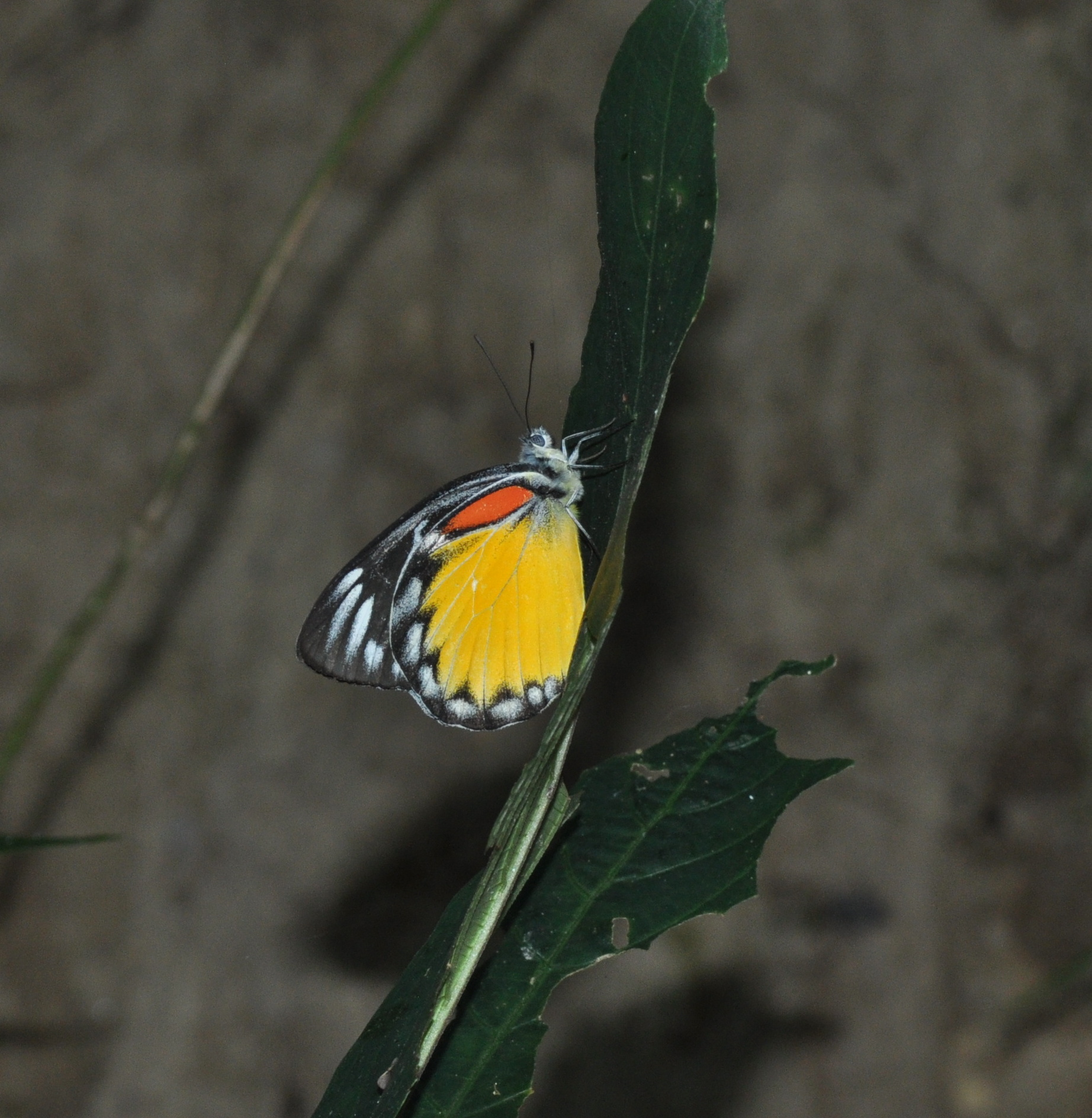
Ventral view

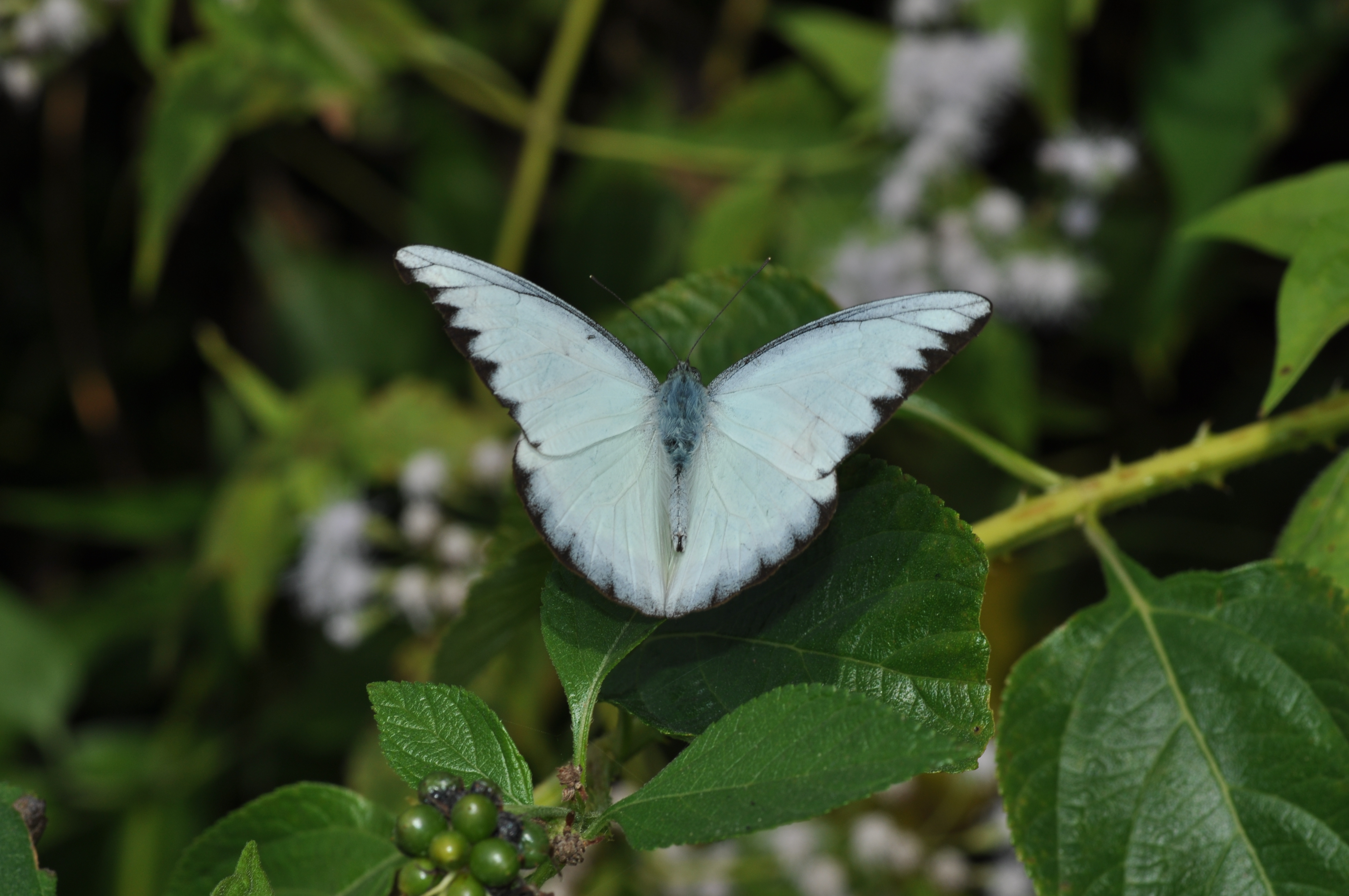
Dorsal view

===== Species: Delias eucharis (Indian Jezebel) =====
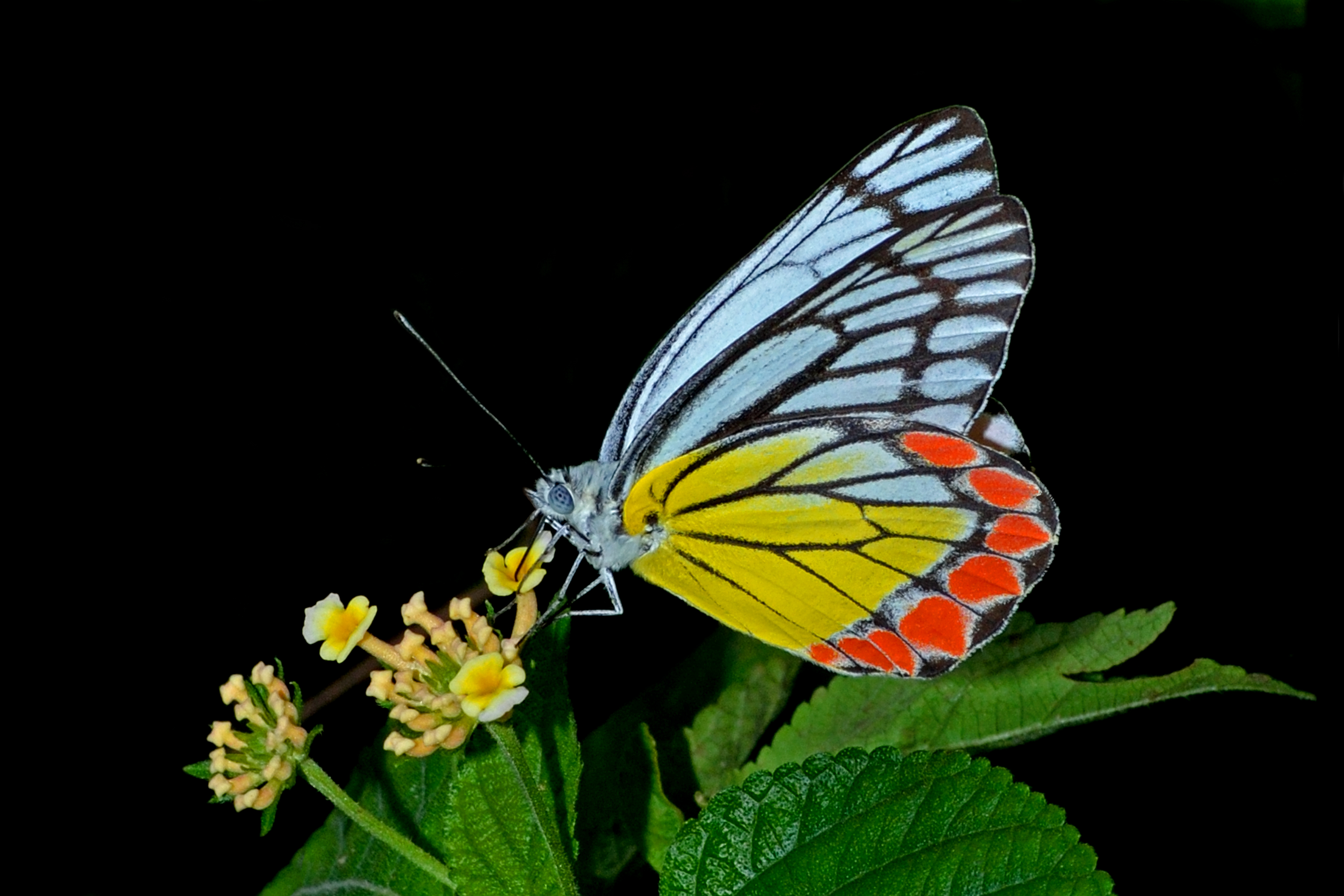
Ventral view

===== Species: Delias hyparete (painted Jezebel) =====
Subspecies: Delias hyparete indica (Indian painted Jezebel)

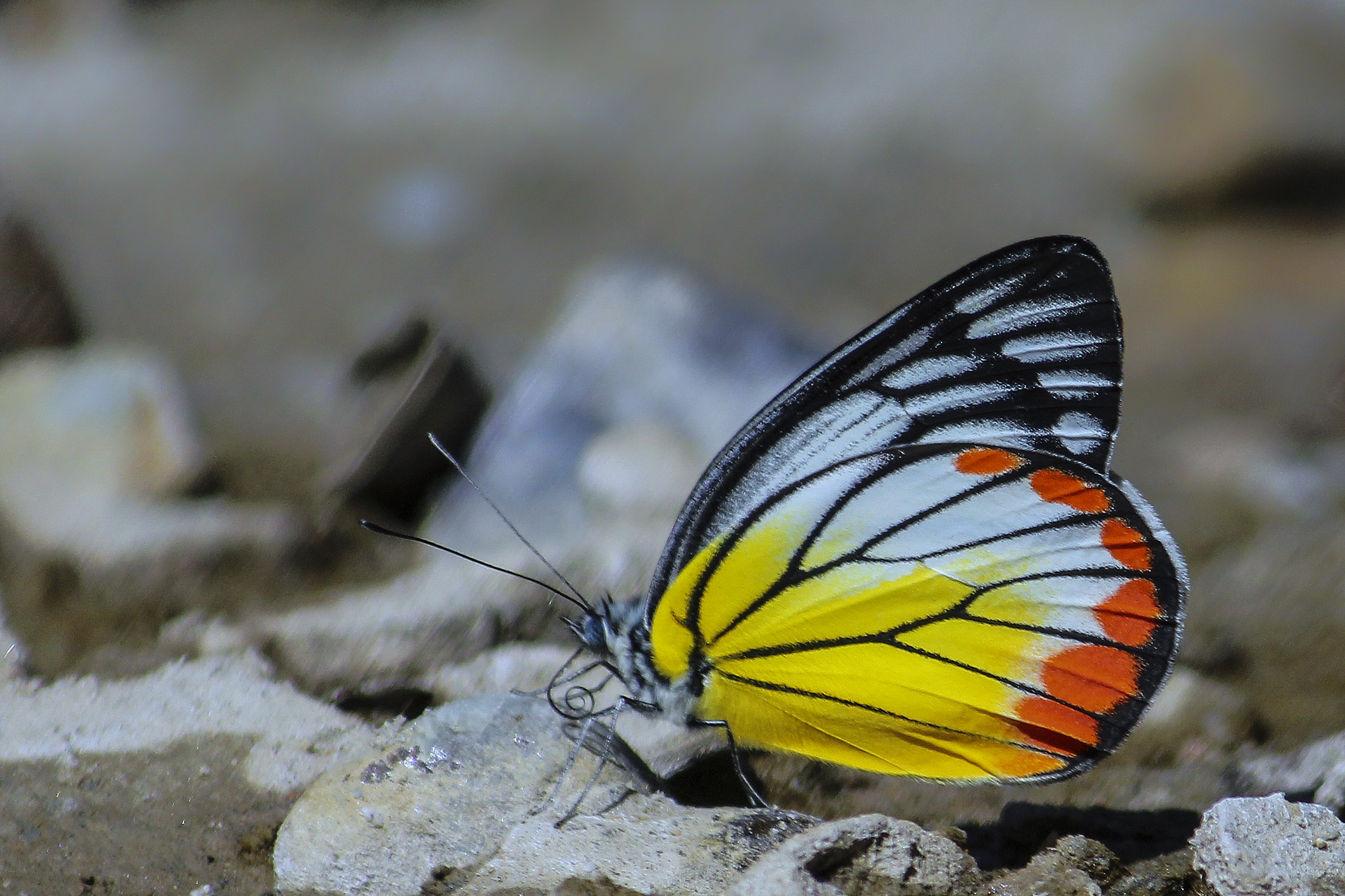
Ventral view

===== Species: Delias pasithoe (red-base Jezebel) =====
Subspecies: Delias pasithoe pasithoe (Chinese red-base Jezebel)

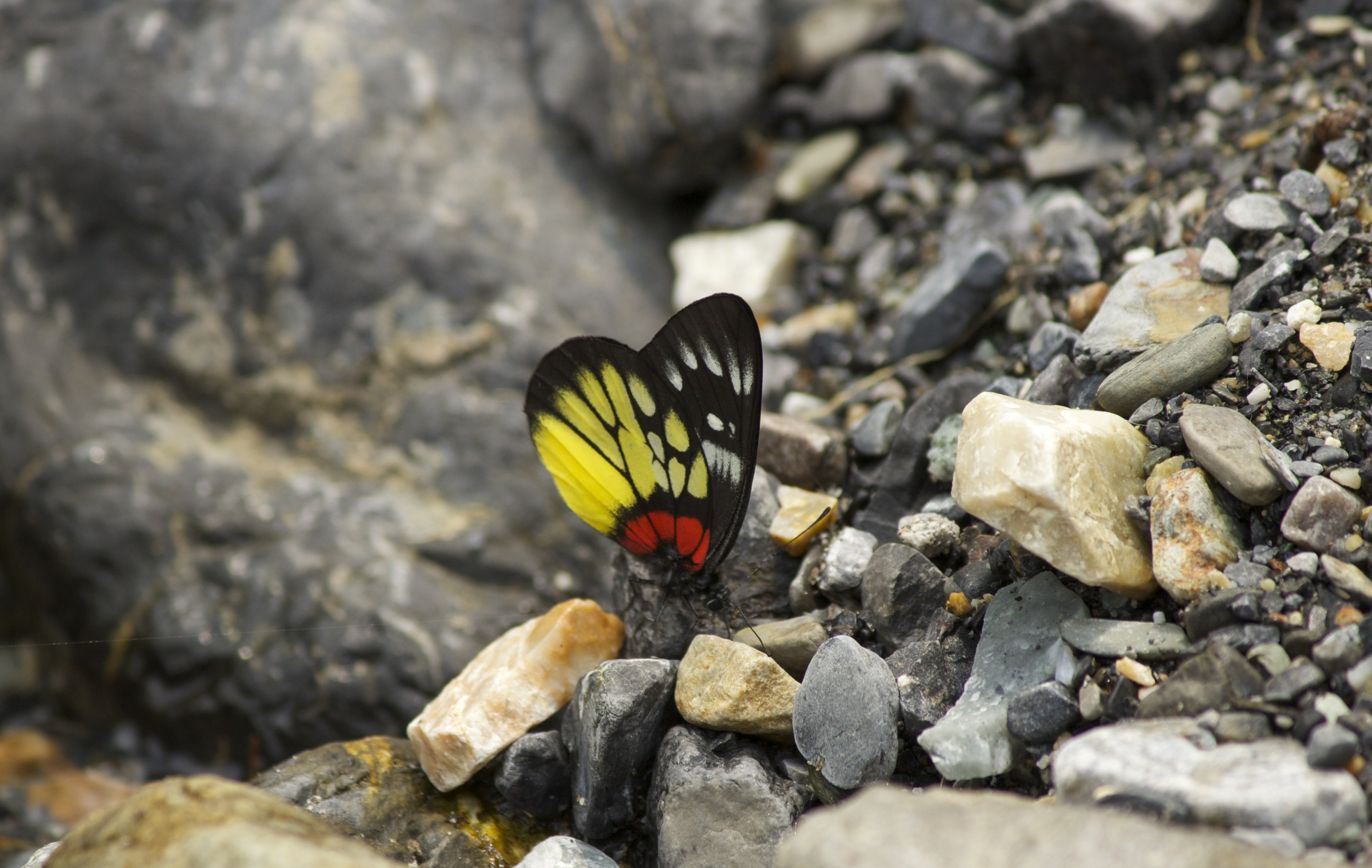
Ventral view

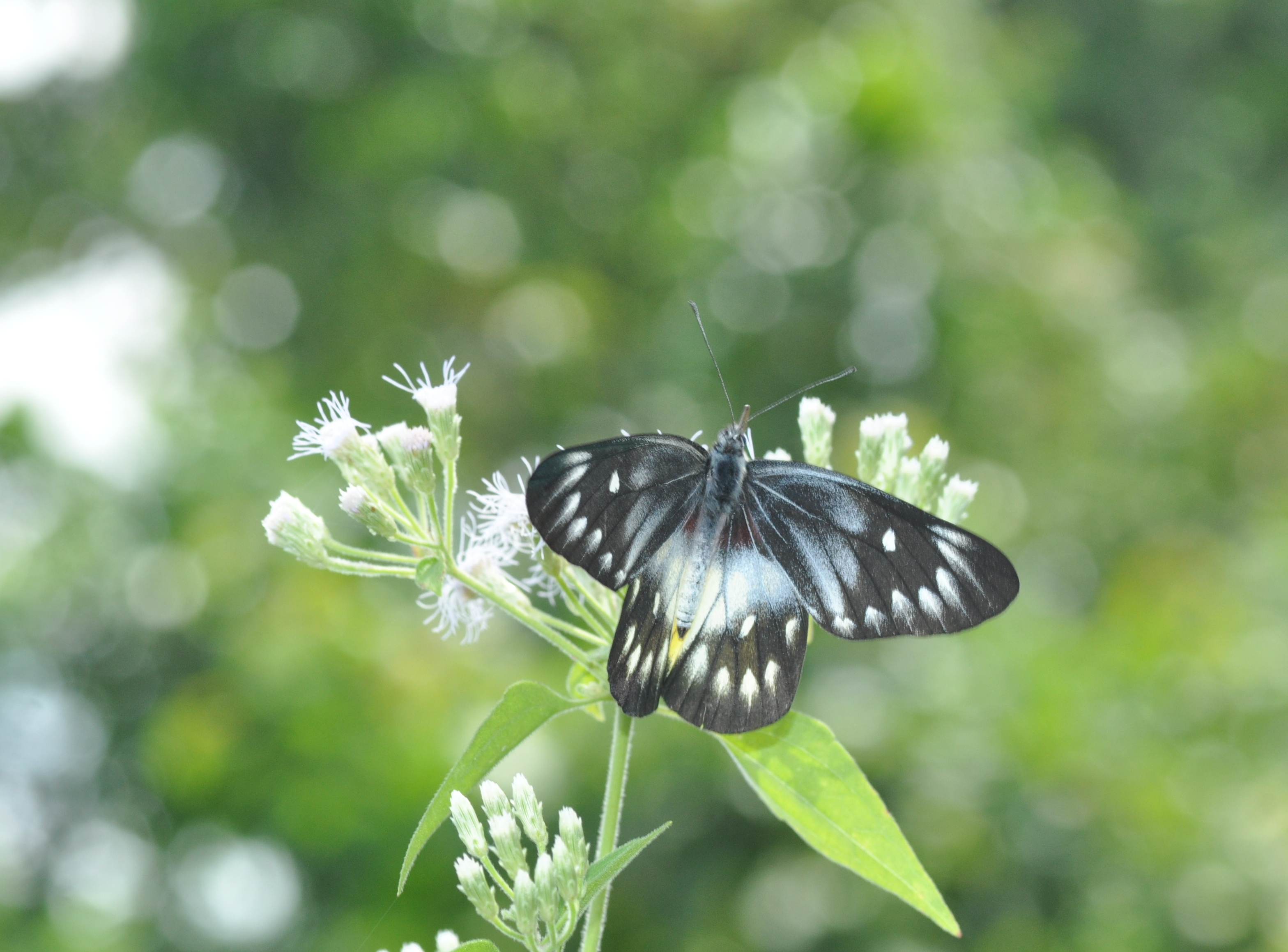
Dorsal view

==== Genus: Prioneris ====
===== Species: Prioneris philonome (redspot sawtooth) =====
Subspecies: Prioneris philonome clemanthe (Burmese redspot sawtooth)

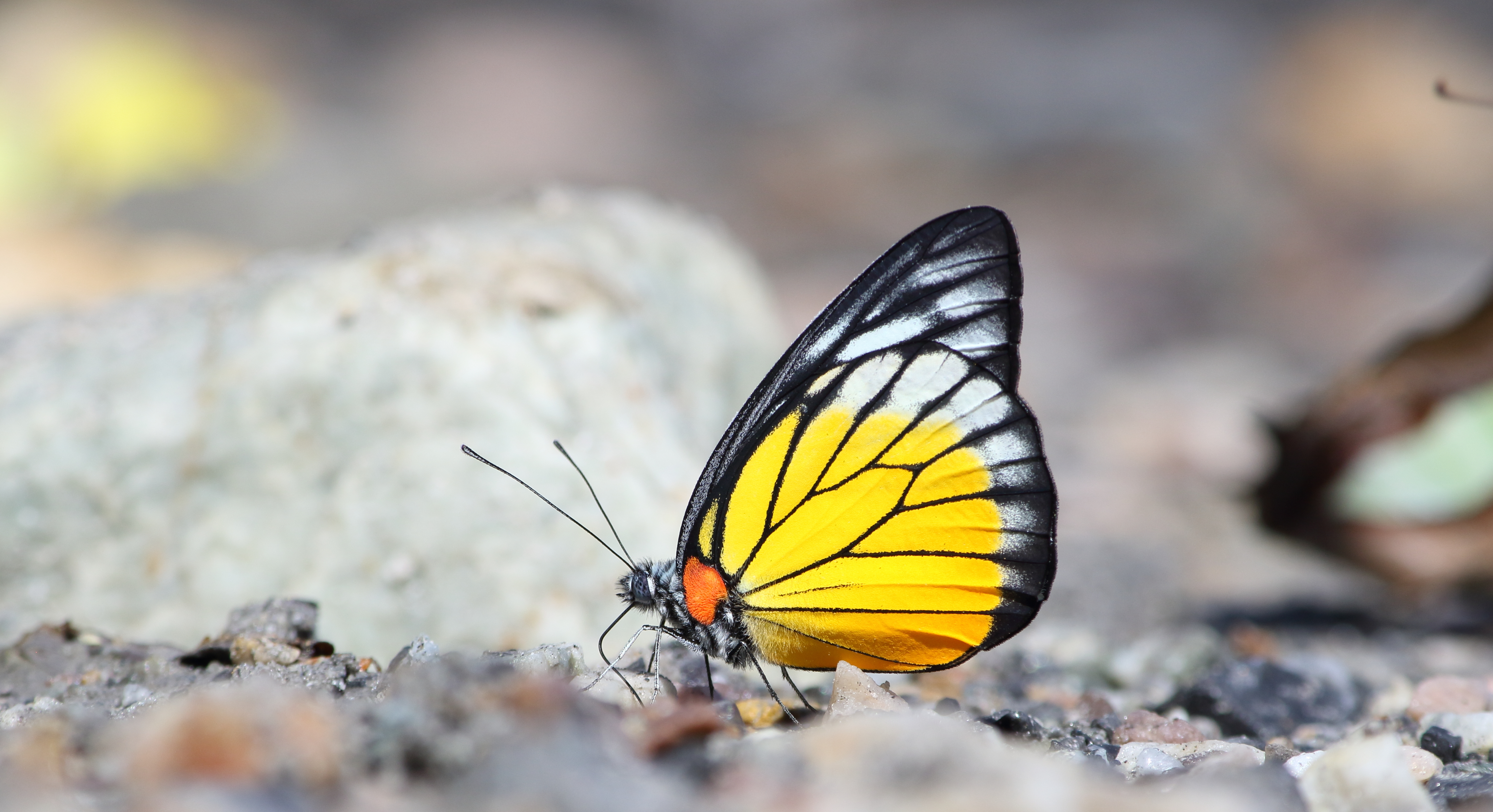
Ventral view

===== Species: Prioneris thestylis (spotted sawtooth) =====
Subspecies: Prioneris thestylis thestylis (Himalayan spotted sawtooth)

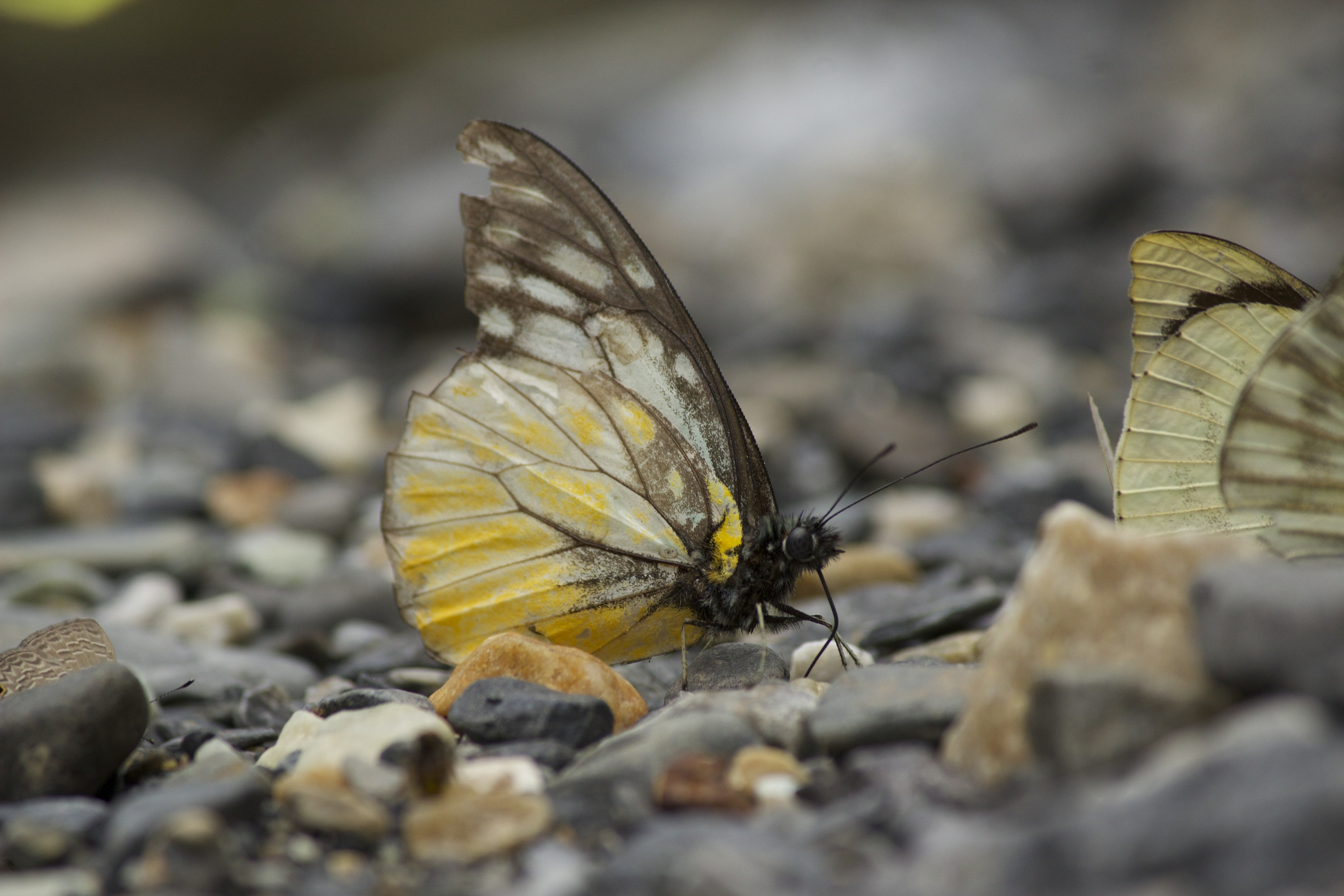
Ventral view

Tribe: Teracolini

==== Genus: Ixias ====
===== Species: Ixias pyrene (yellow orange-tip) =====
Subspecies: Ixias pyrene familiaris (east Himalayan yellow orange-tip)

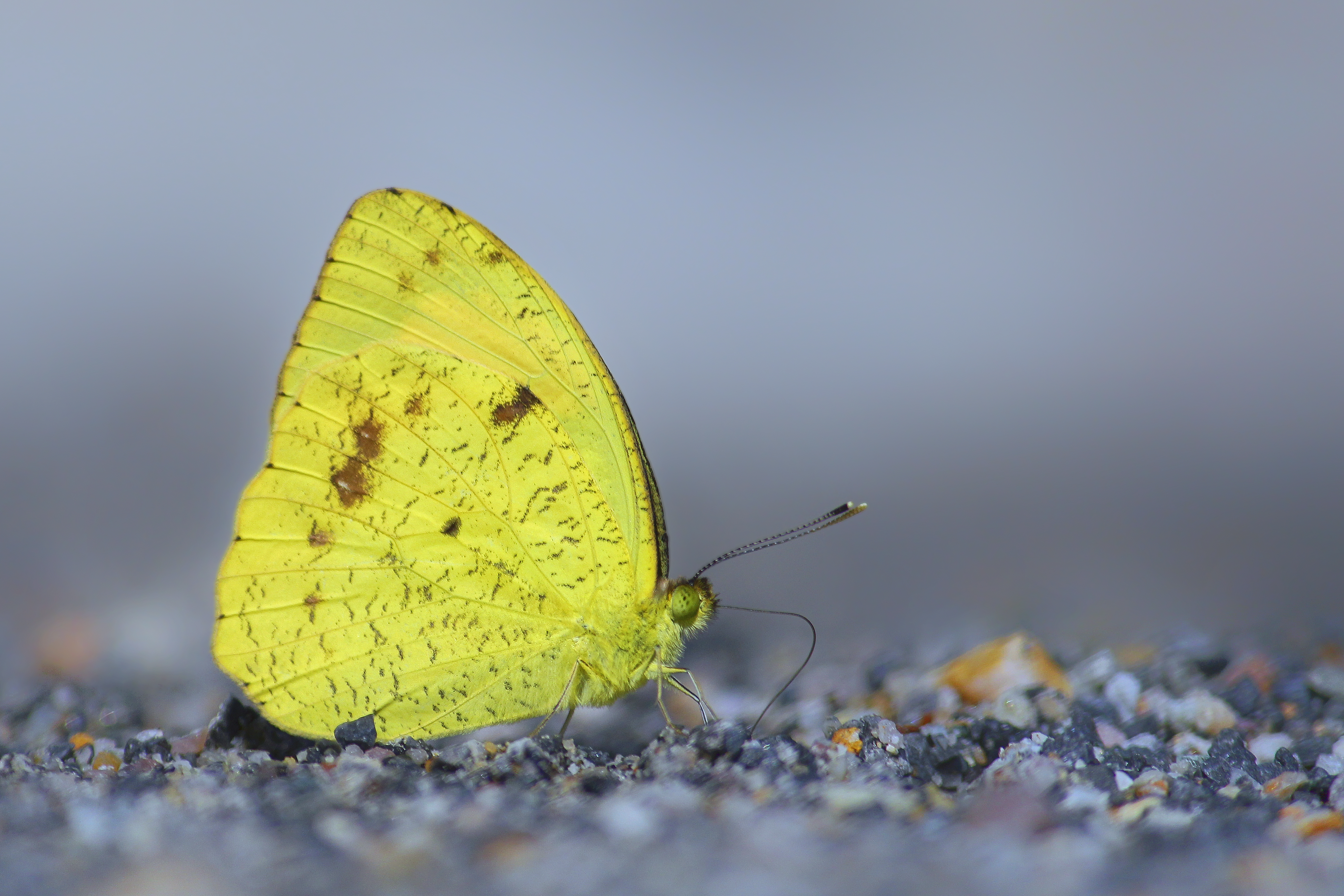
Ventral view

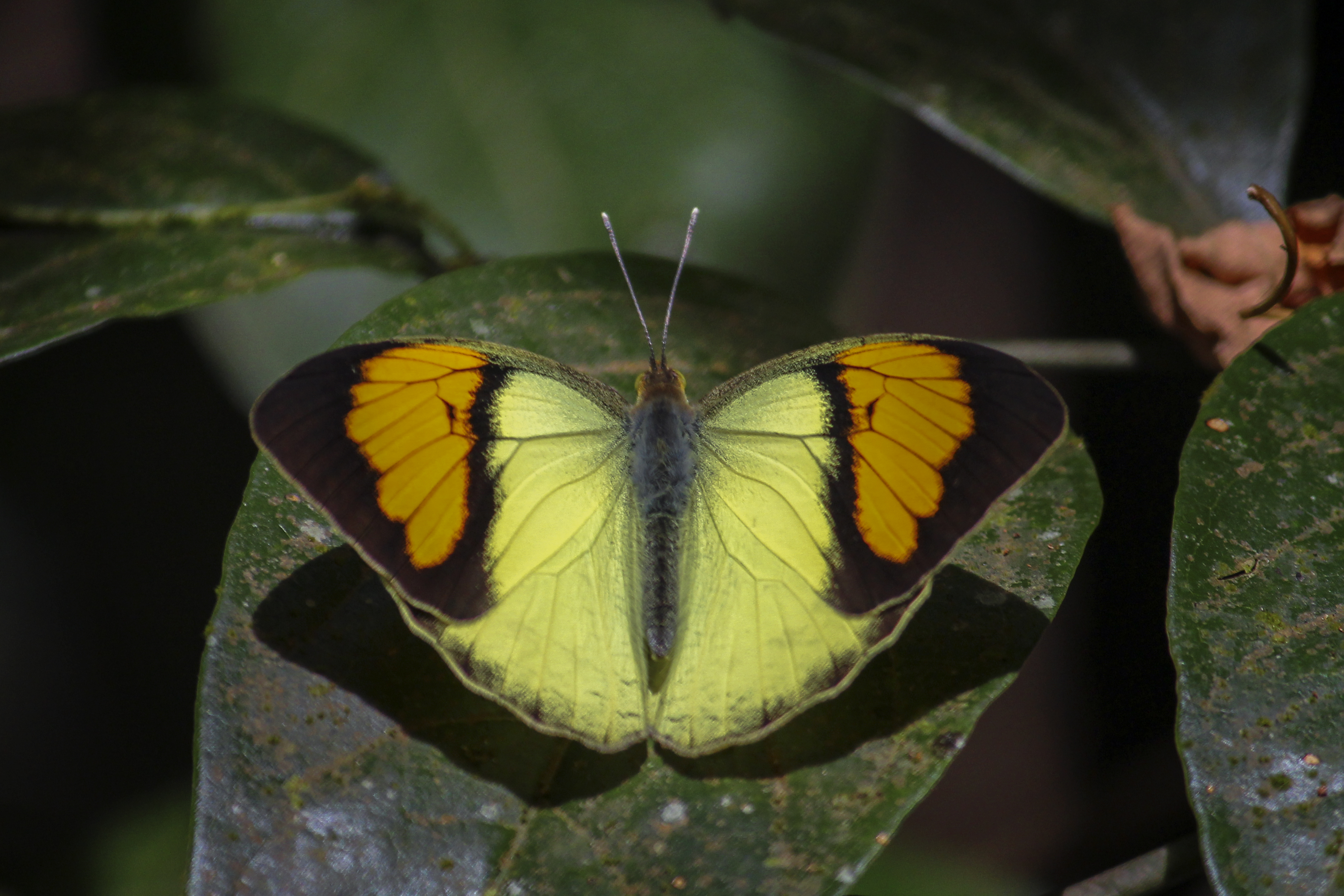
Dorsal view

== Family: Nymphalidae ==
=== Subfamily: Apaturinae ===
Tribe: Apaturini

==== Genus: Euripus ====
===== Species: Euripus nyctelius (courtesan) =====
Subspecies: Euripus nyctelius nyctelius (Sylhet Circe)

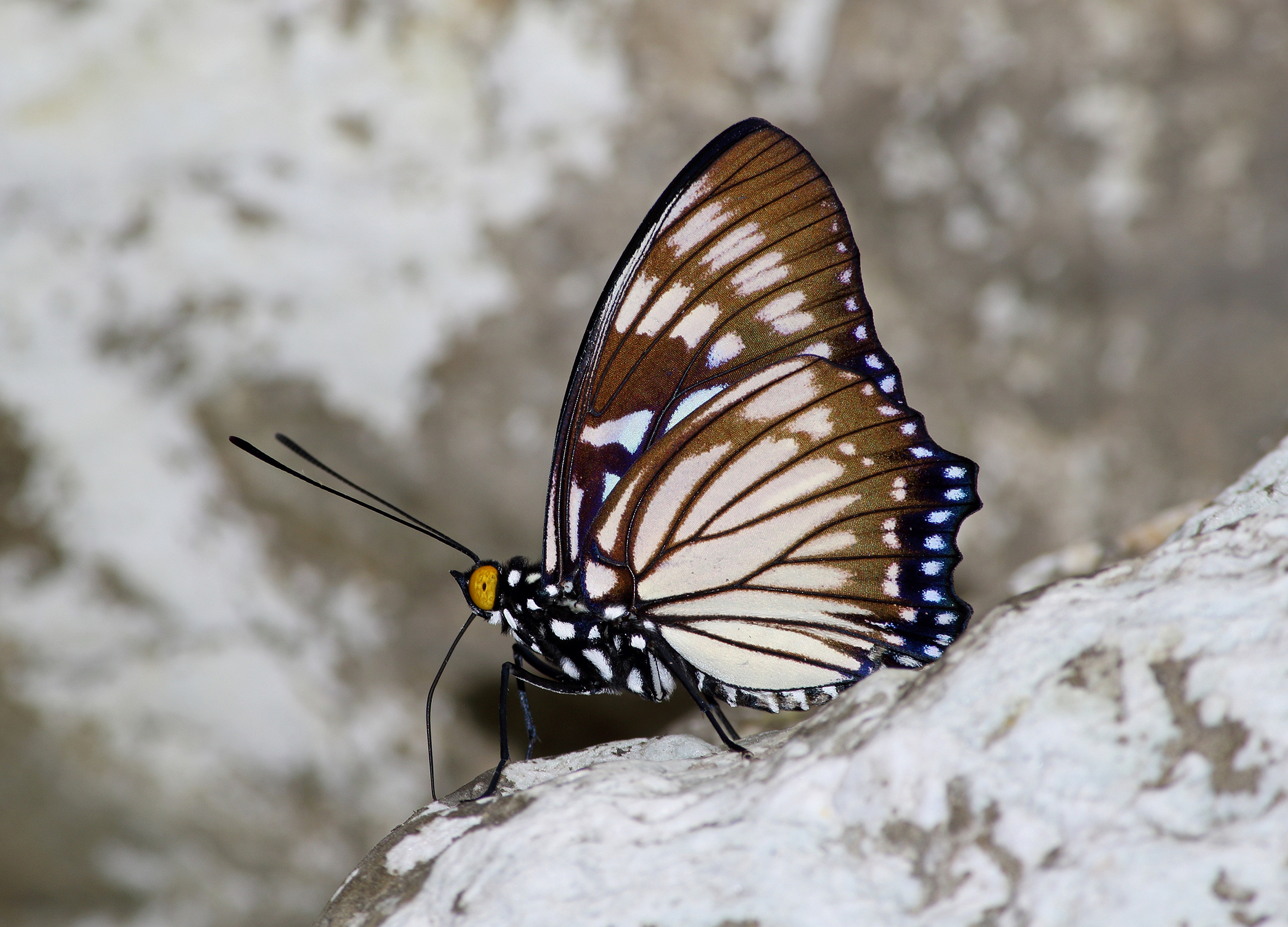
Ventral view (male)

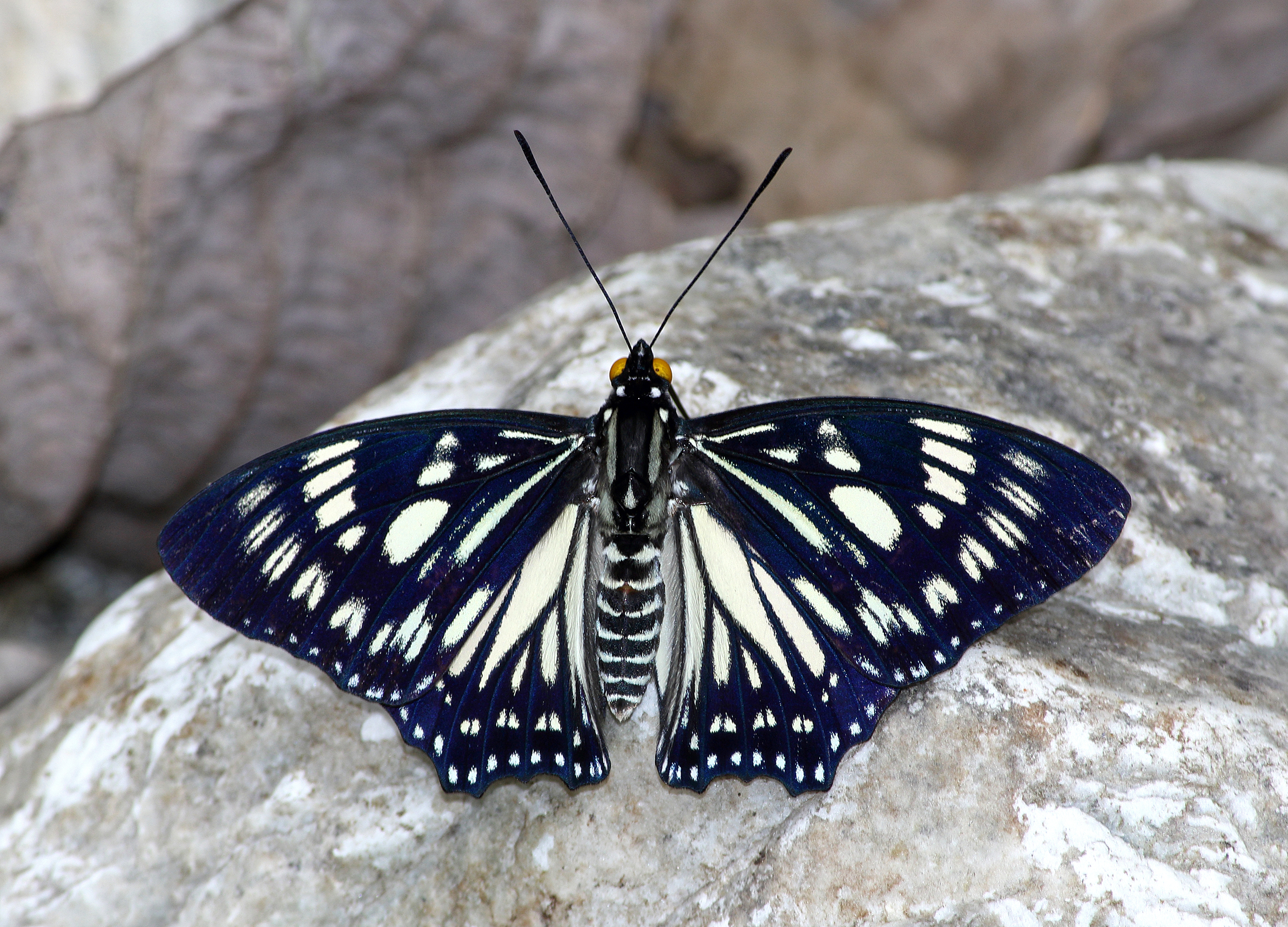
Dorsal view (male)

==== Genus: Hestinalis ====
===== Species: Hestinalis nama (Circe) =====
Subspecies: Hestinalis nama nama (Sylhet courtesan)

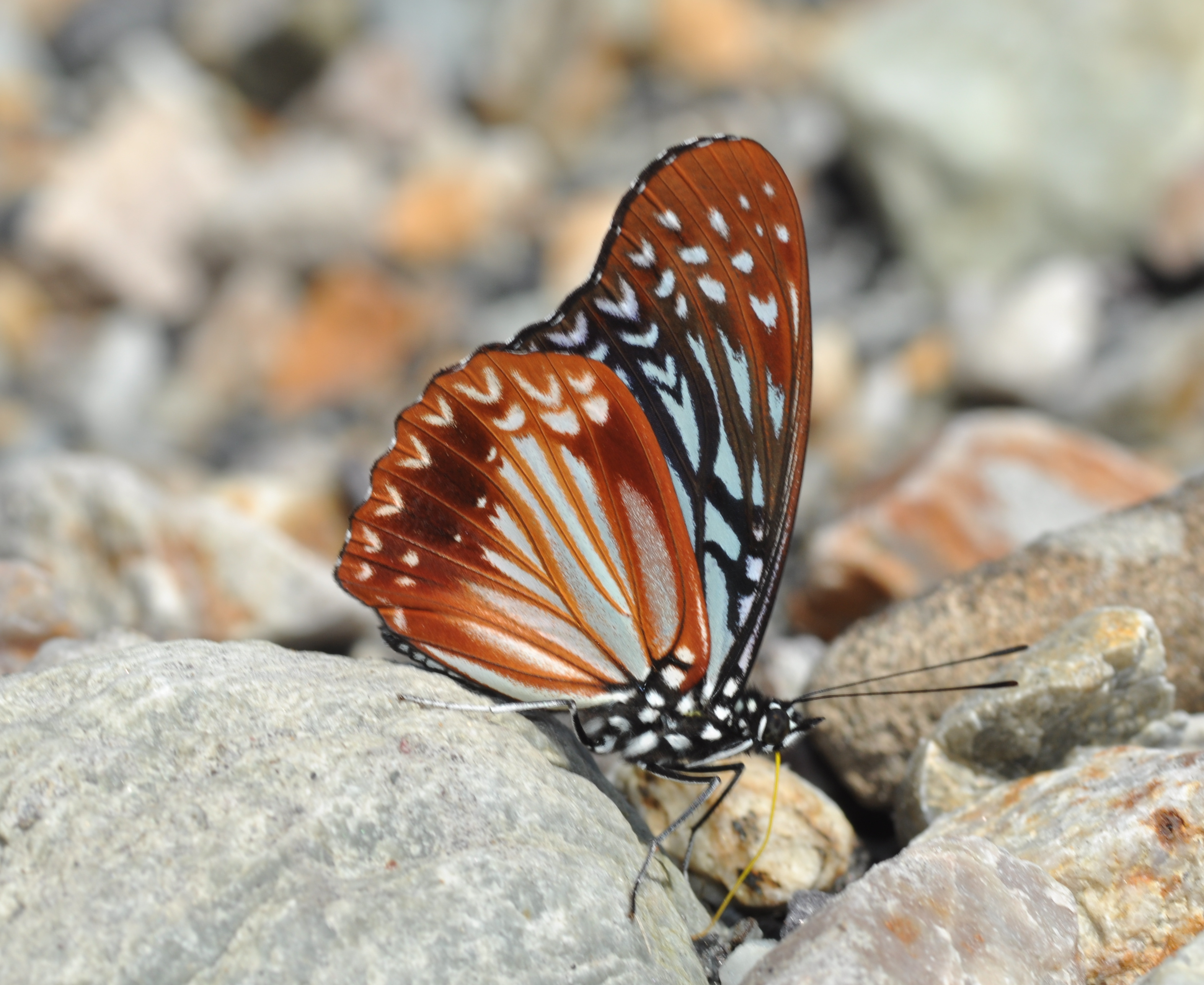
Ventral view

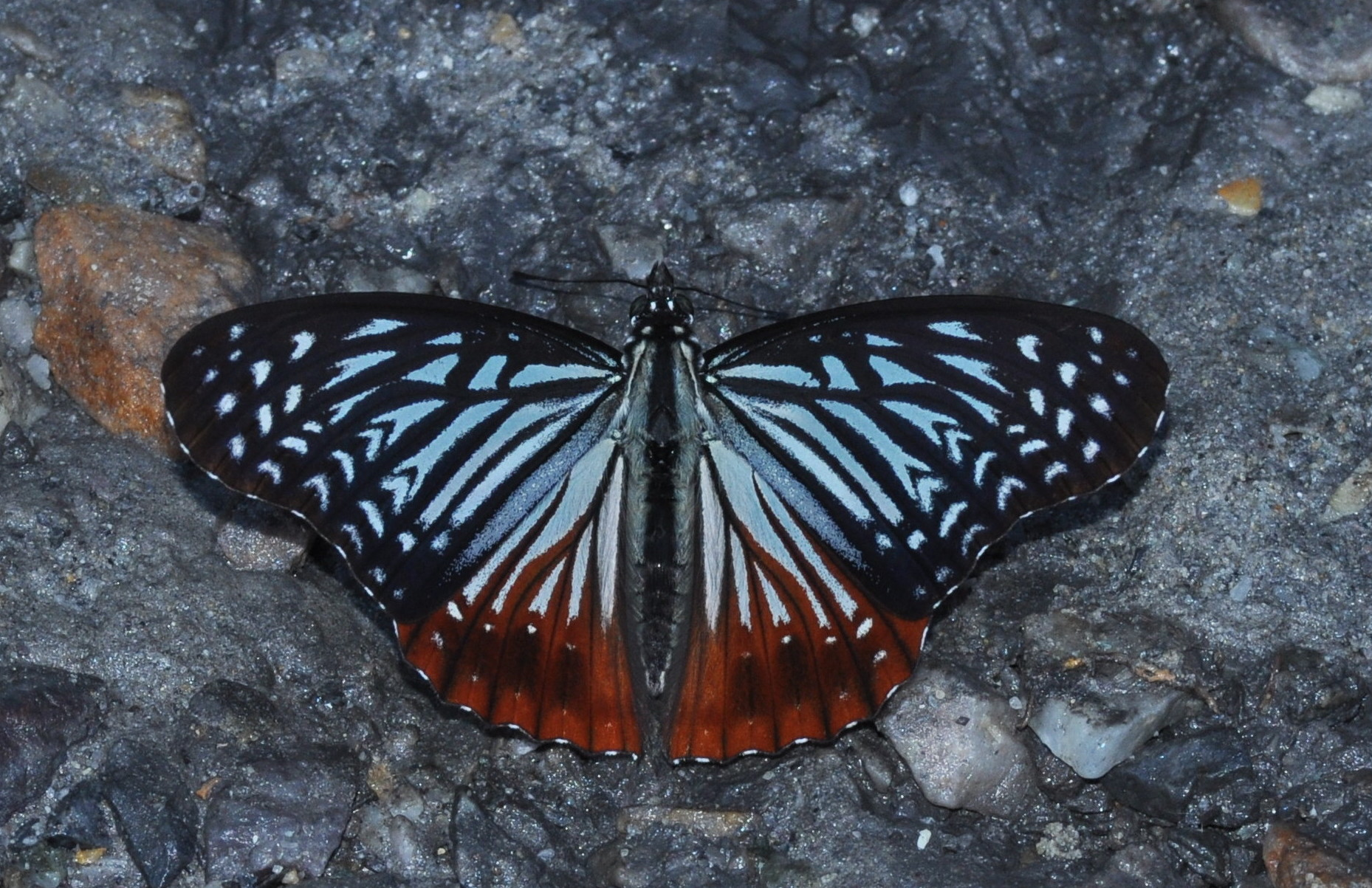
Dorsal view

==== Genus: Mimathyma ====
===== Species: Mimathyma ambica (Indian purple emperor) =====
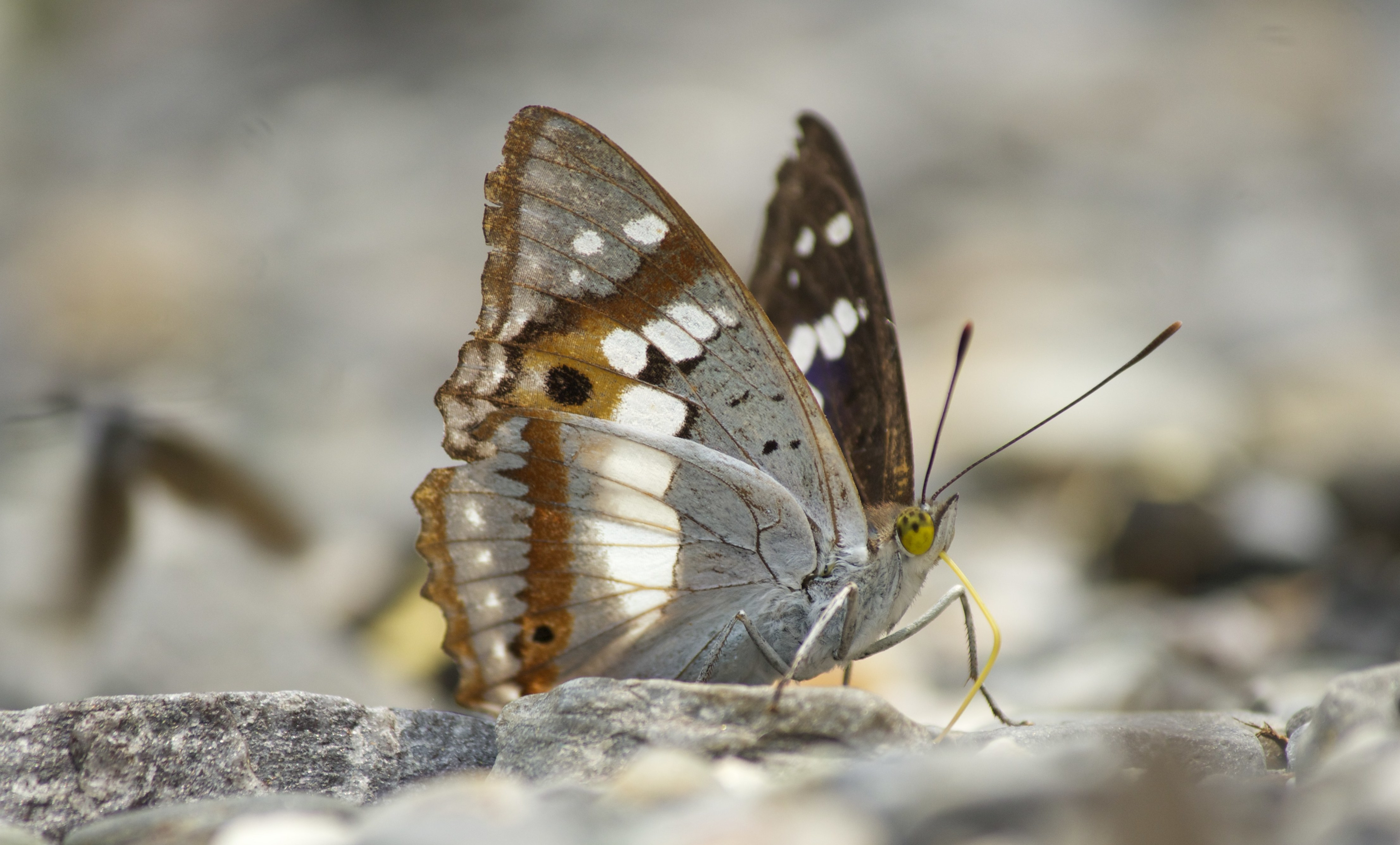
Ventral view

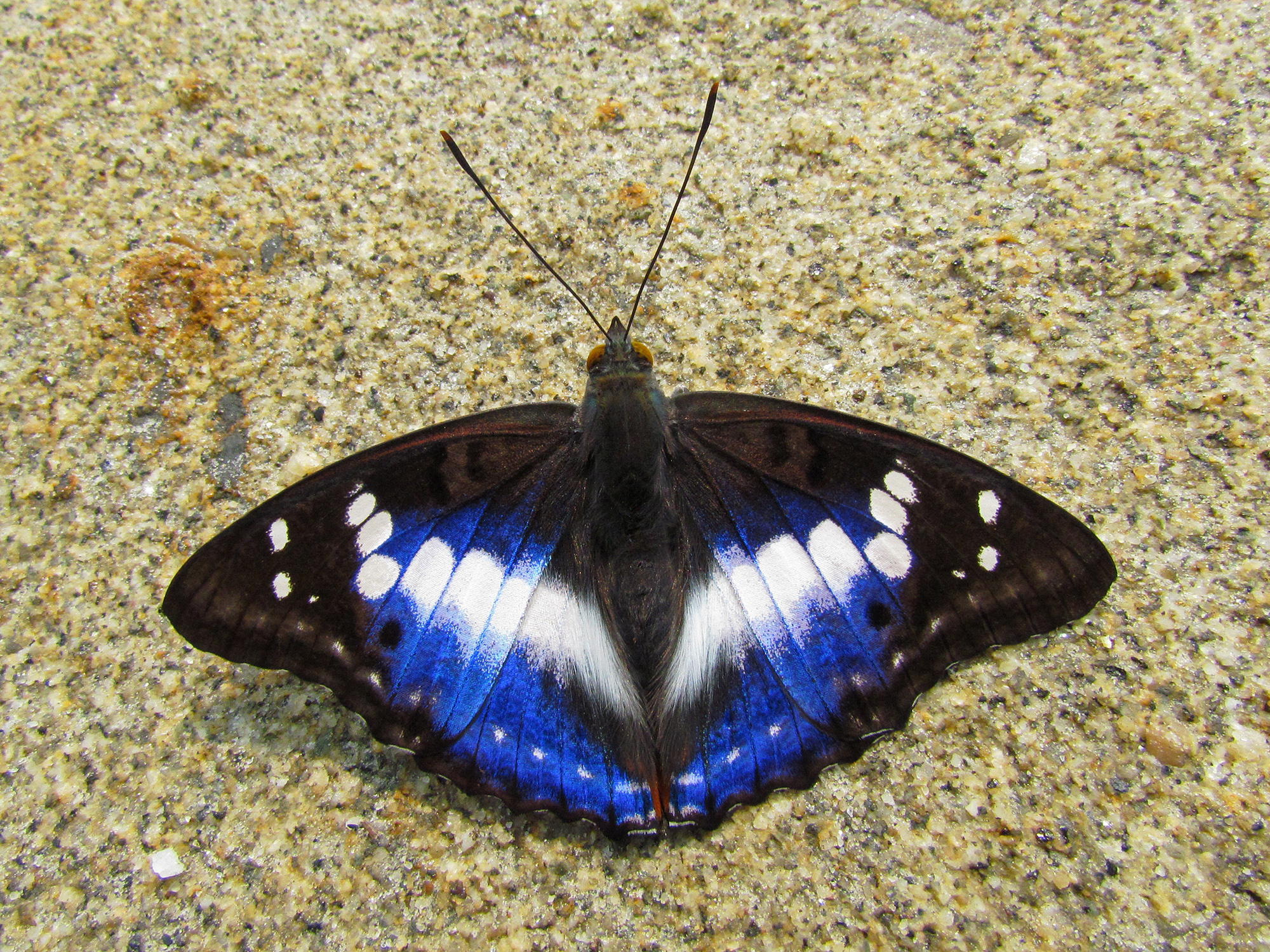
Dorsal view

==== Genus: Rohana (princes) ====
===== Species: Rohana parisatis (black prince) =====
Subspecies: Rohana parisatis parisatis (Assam black prince)

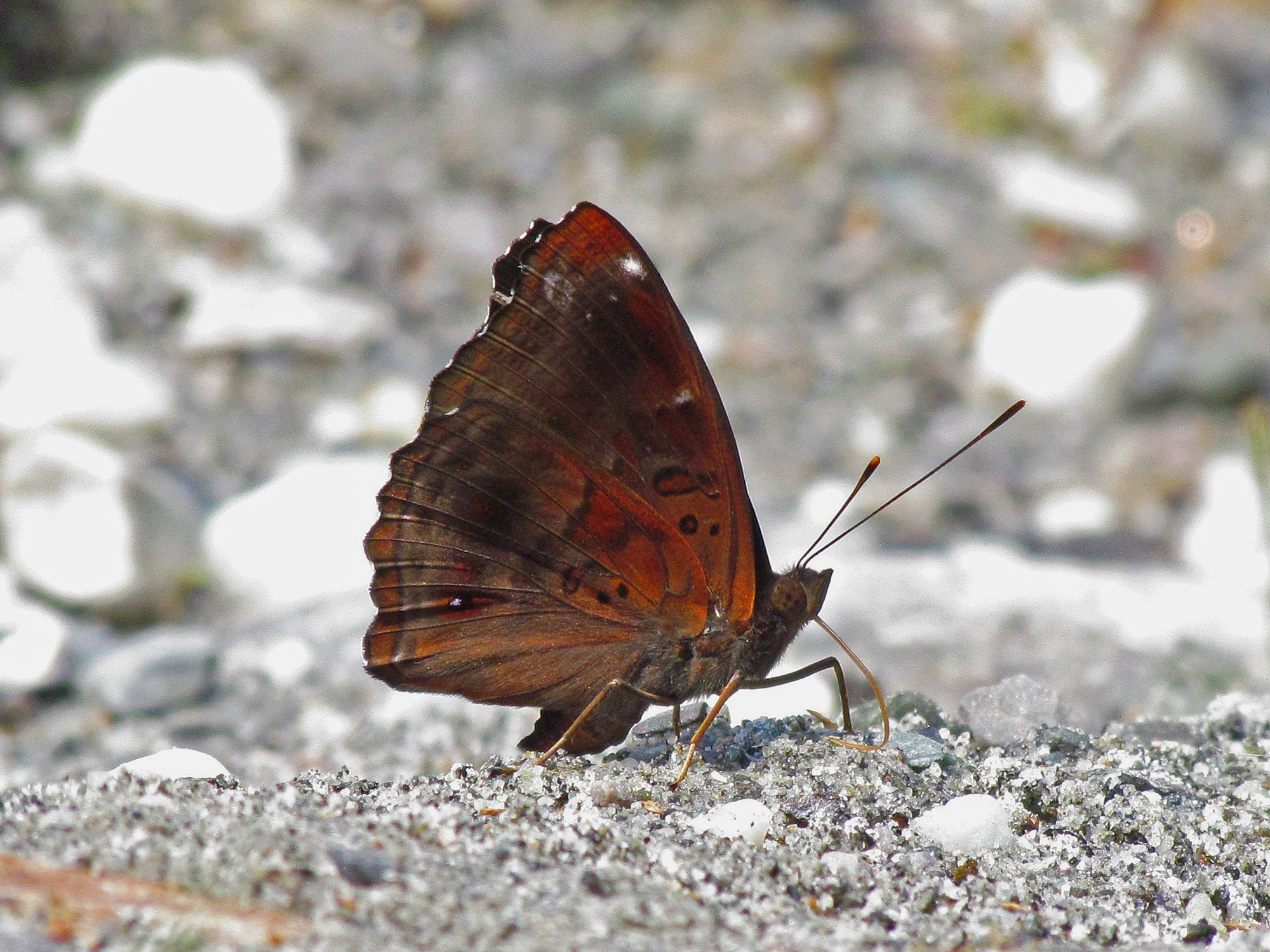
Ventral view

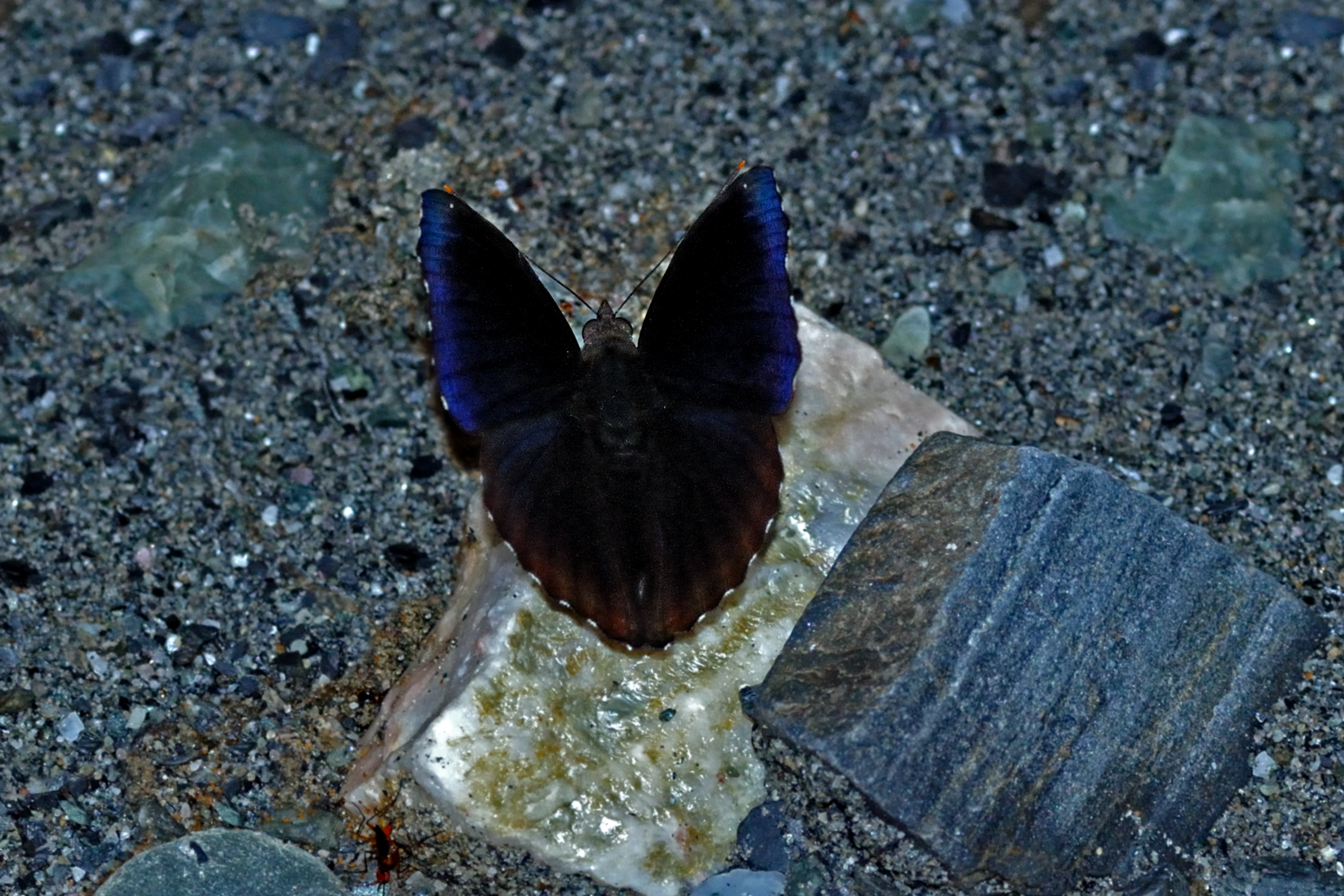
Dorsal view

=== Subfamily: Biblidinae ===
Tribe: Danaini

==== Genus: Ariadne (castors) ====
===== Species: Ariadne ariadne (angled castor) =====
Subspecies: Ariadne ariadne indica (Indian angled castor)

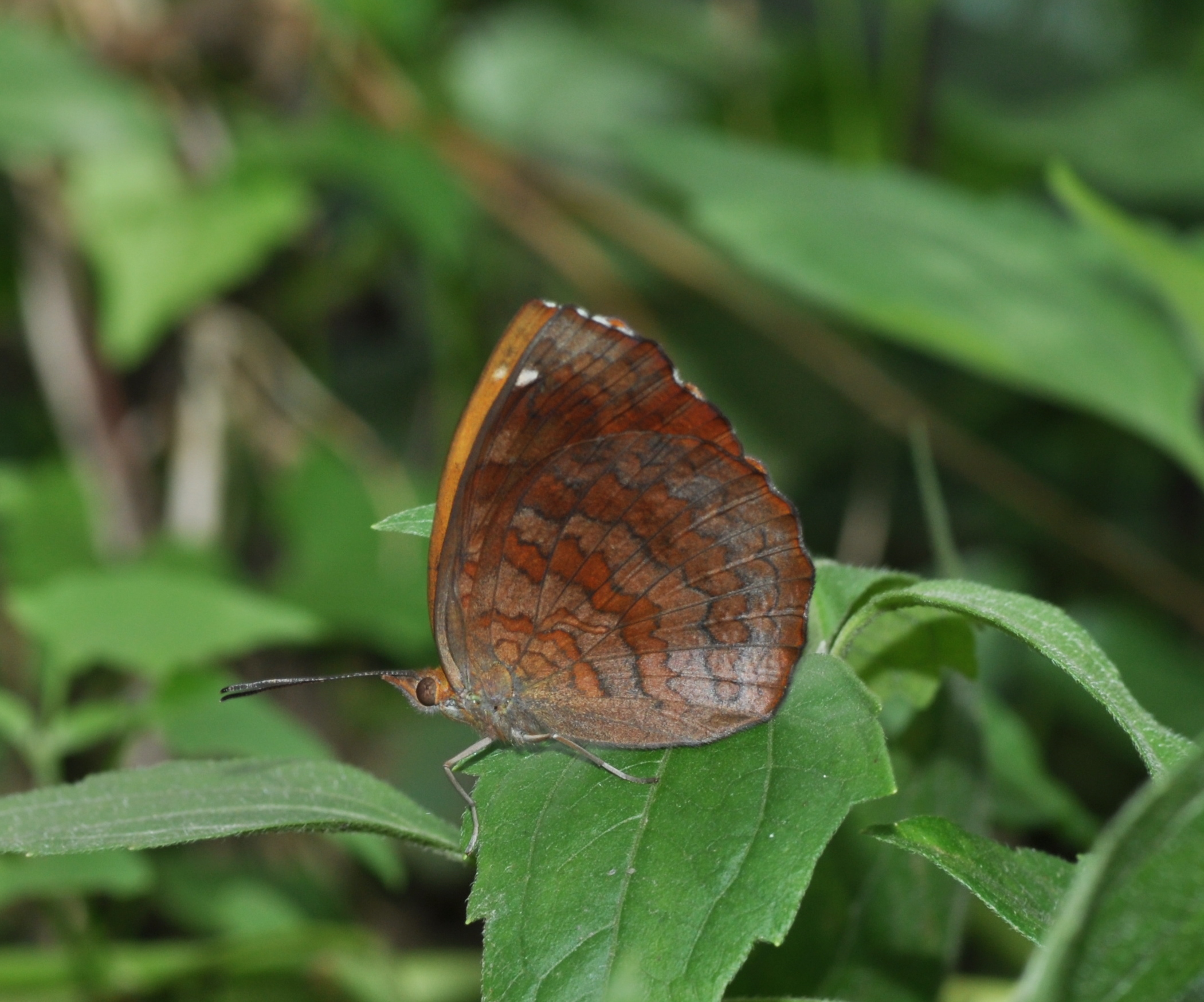
Ventral view

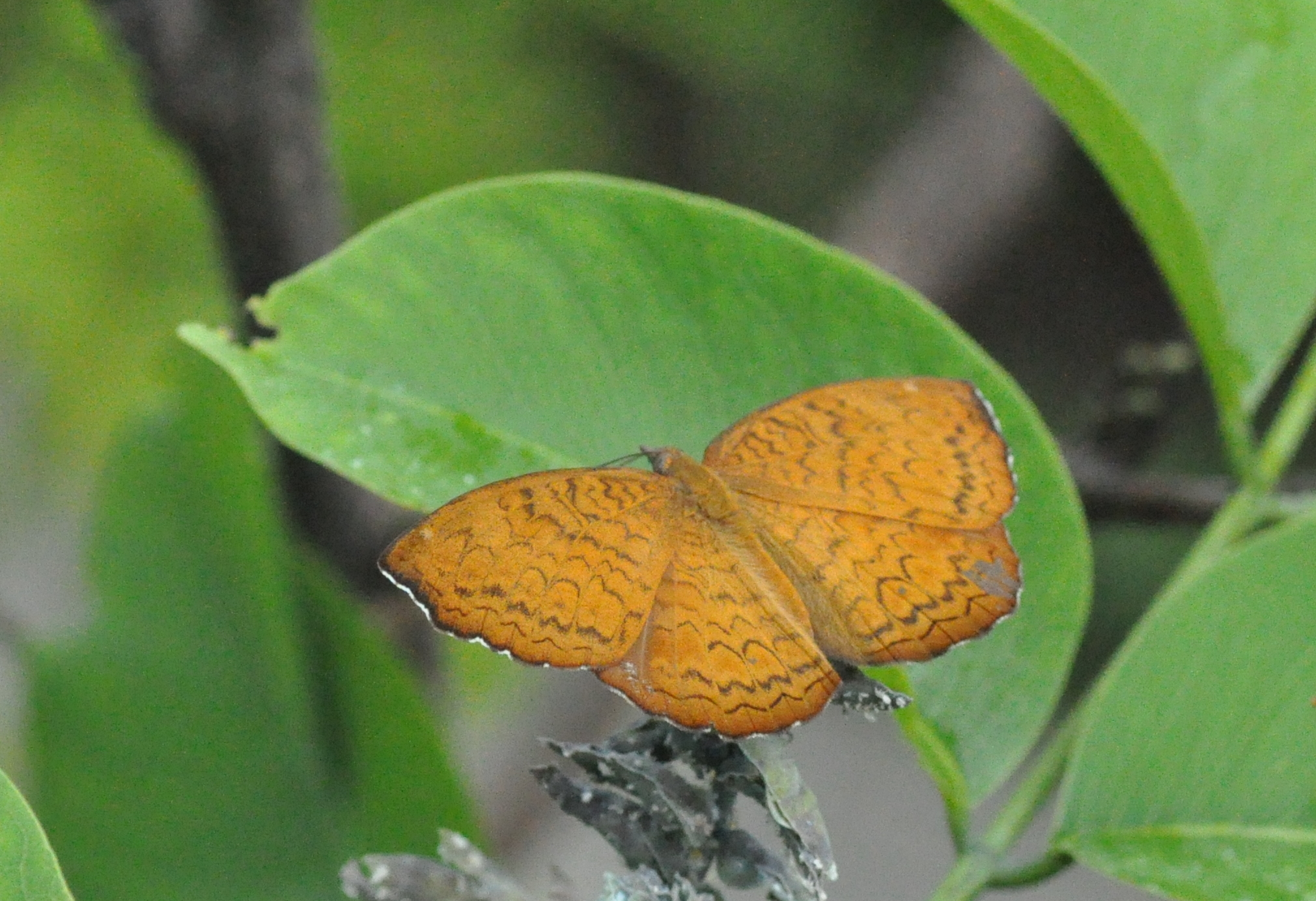
Dorsal view

===== Species: Ariadne merione (common castor) =====
Subspecies: Ariadne merione tapestrina (intricate common castor)

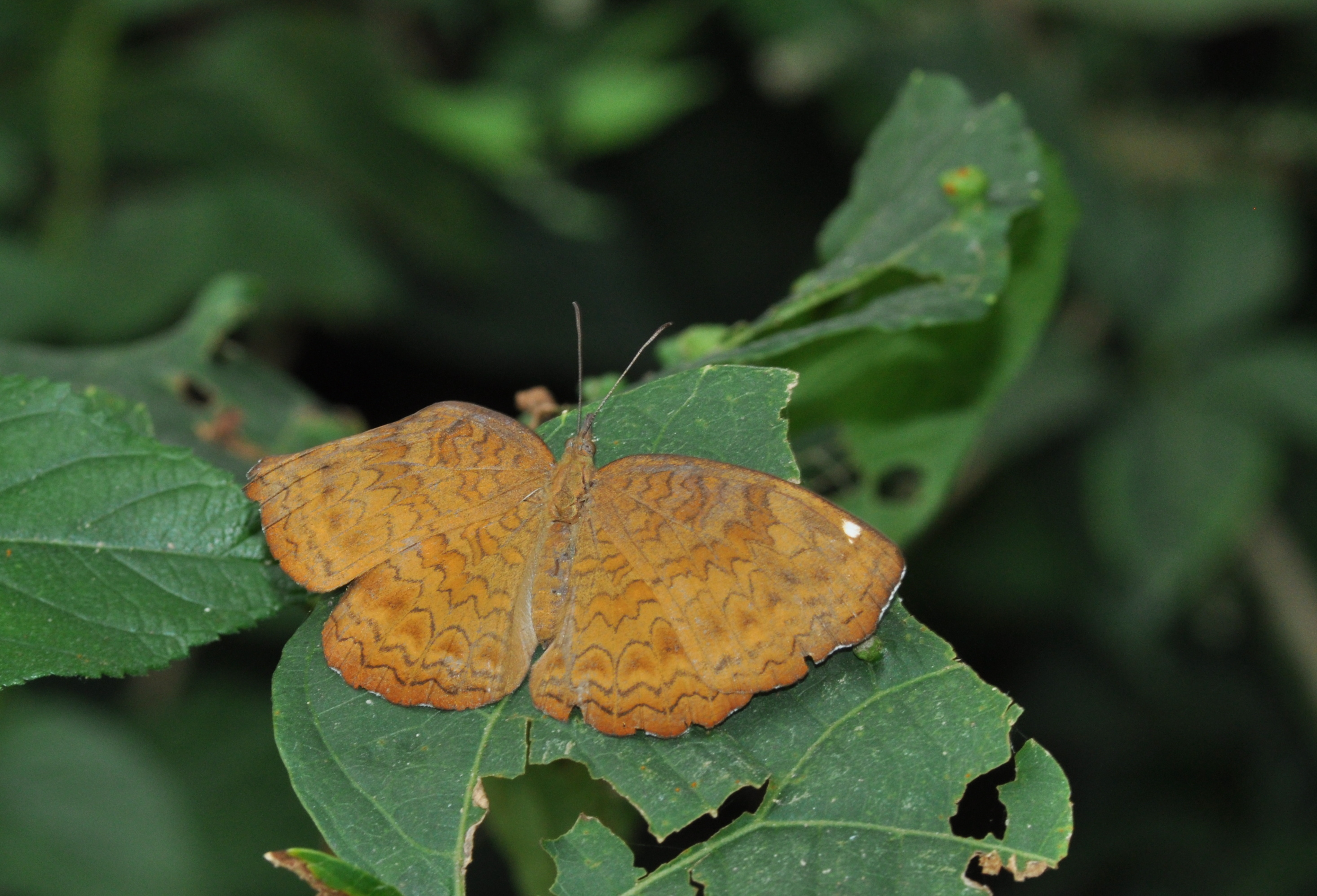
Dorsal view

=== Subfamily: Charaxinae ===
==== Genus: Charaxes (rajahs and nawabs) ====
===== Species: Charaxes arja (pallid nawab) =====
Subspecies: Charaxes arja arja (Bengal pallid nawab)

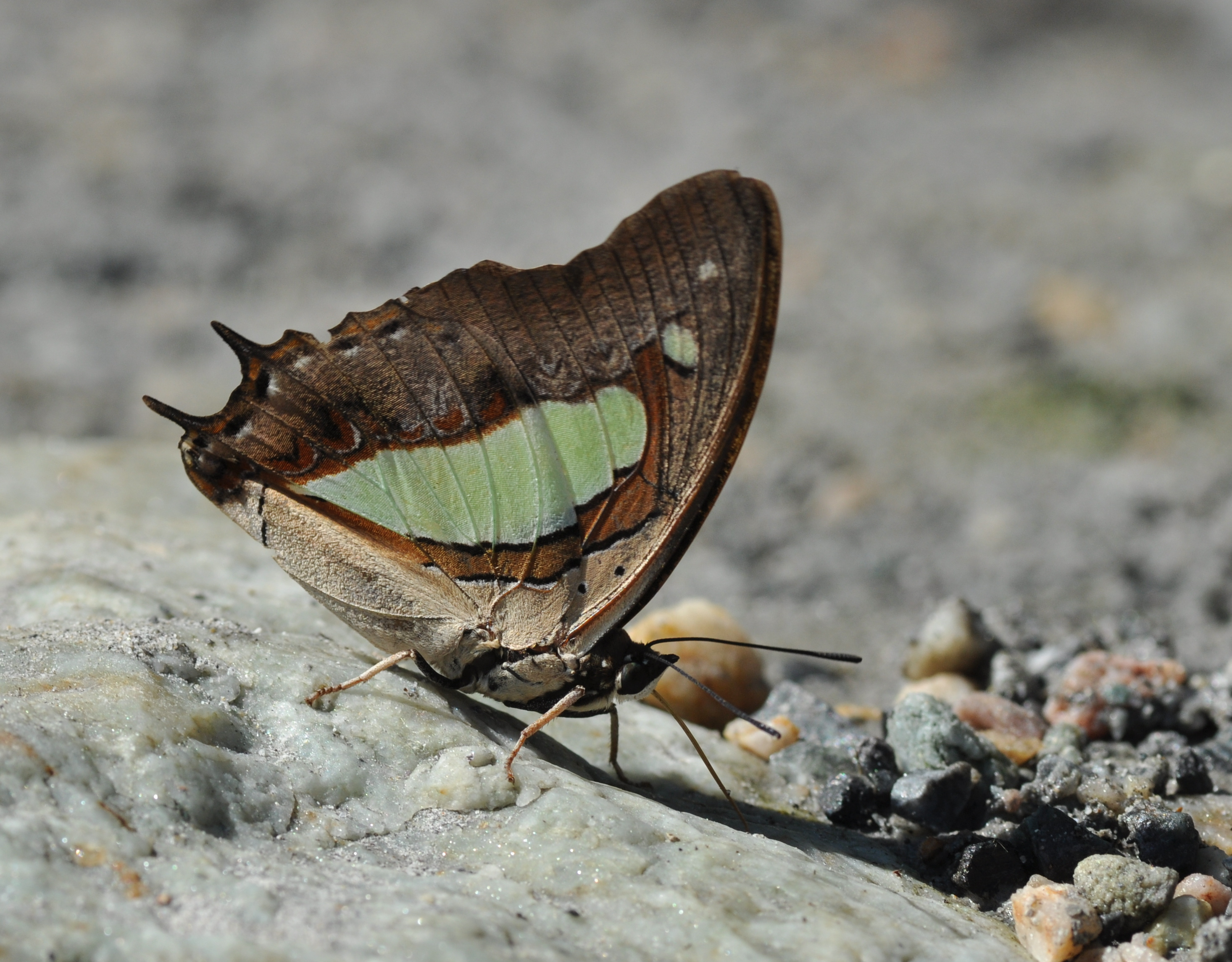
Ventral view

===== Species: Charaxes bernardus (tawny rajah) =====
Subspecies: Charaxes bernardus hierax (variable tawny rajah)

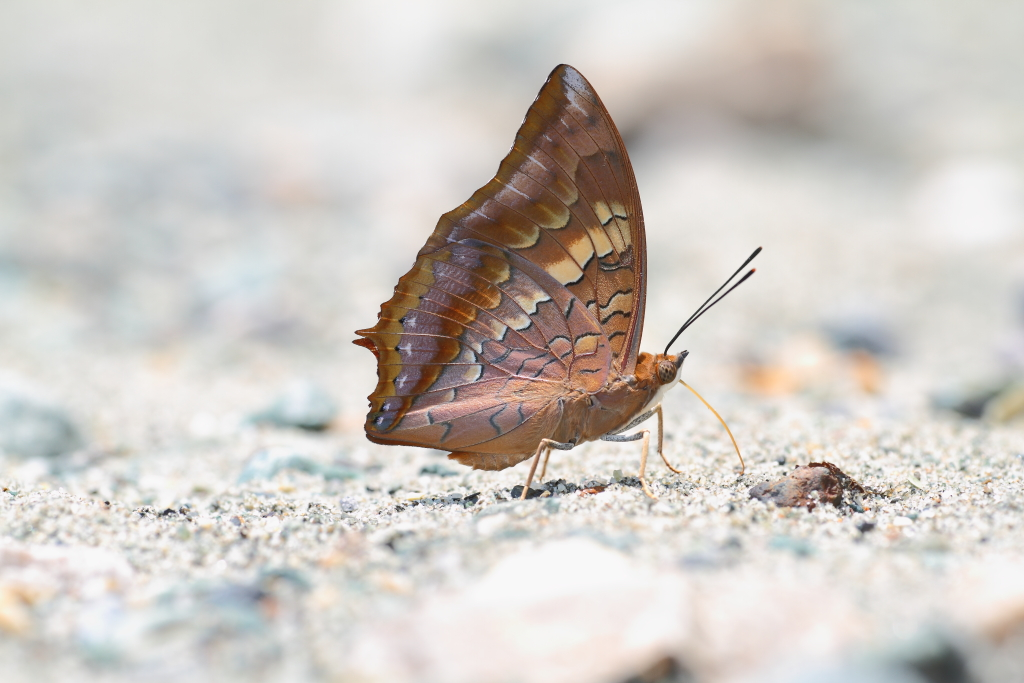
Ventral view

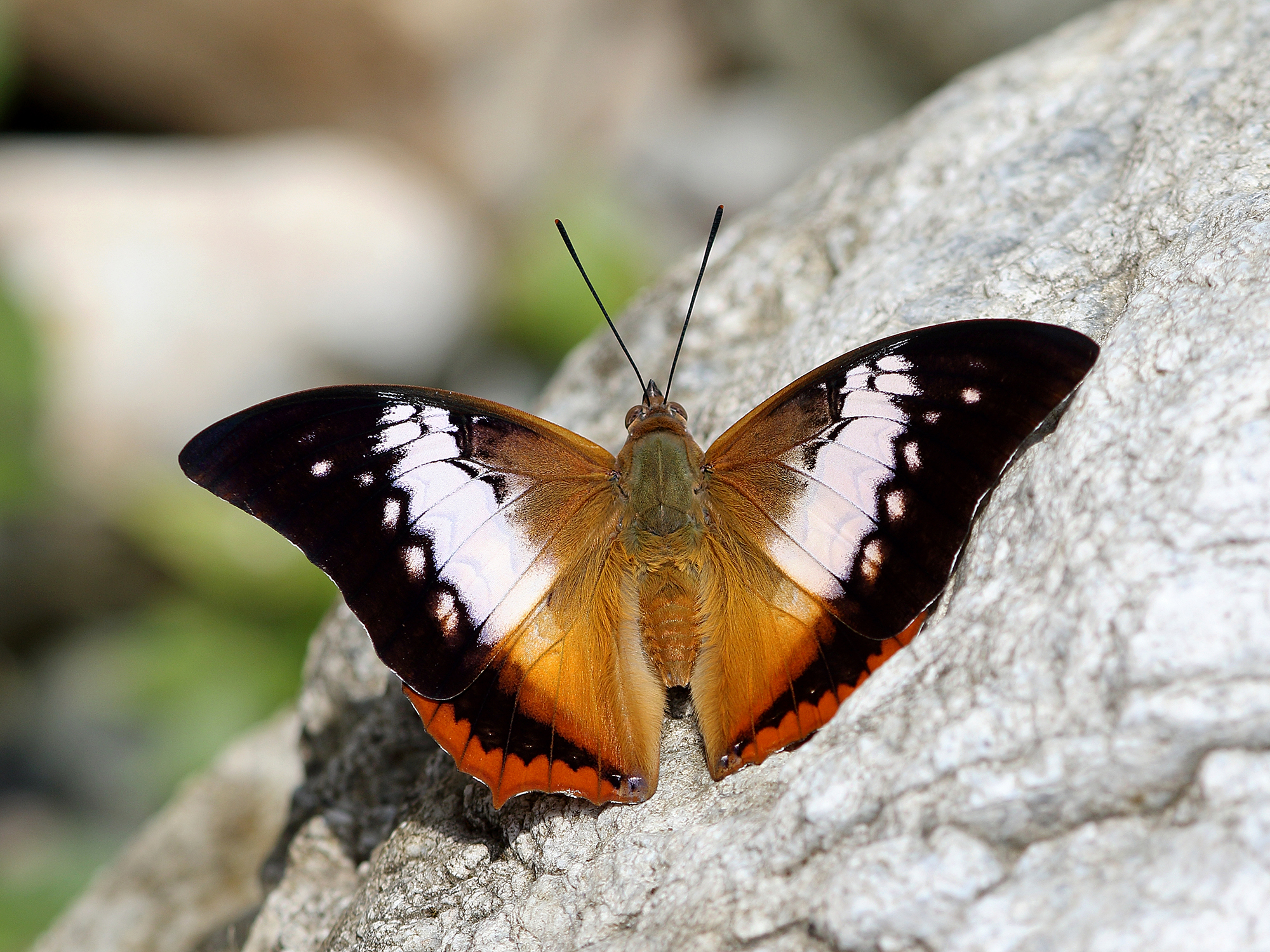
Dorsal view

===== Charaxes athamas (common nawab) =====
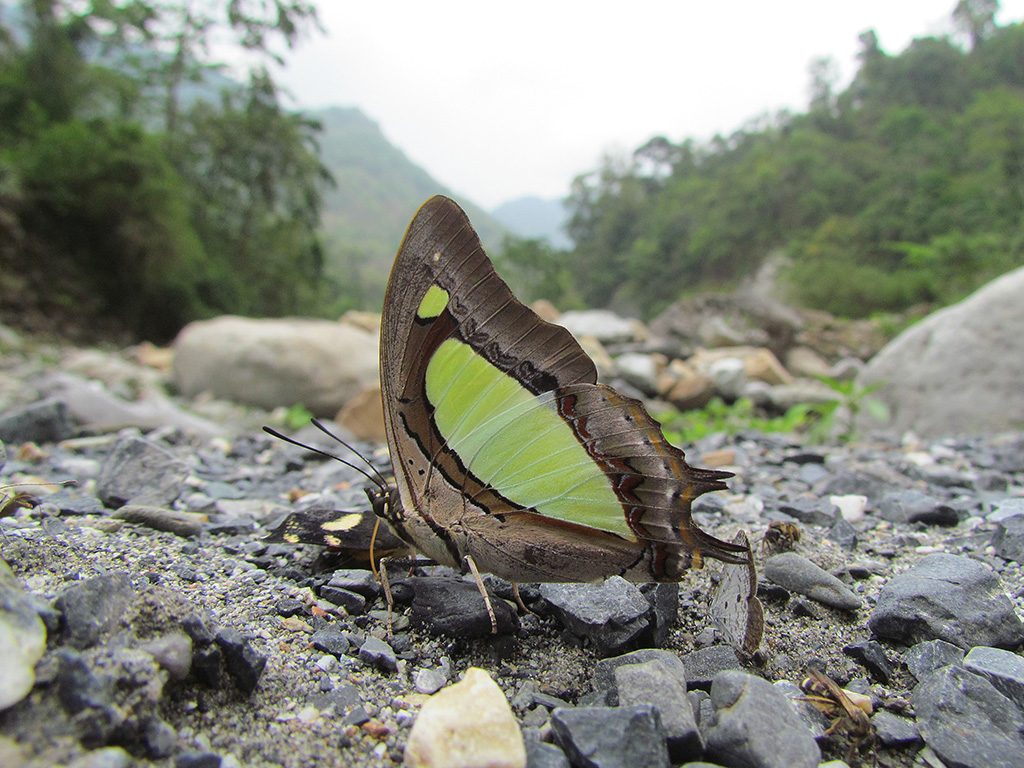
Ventral view

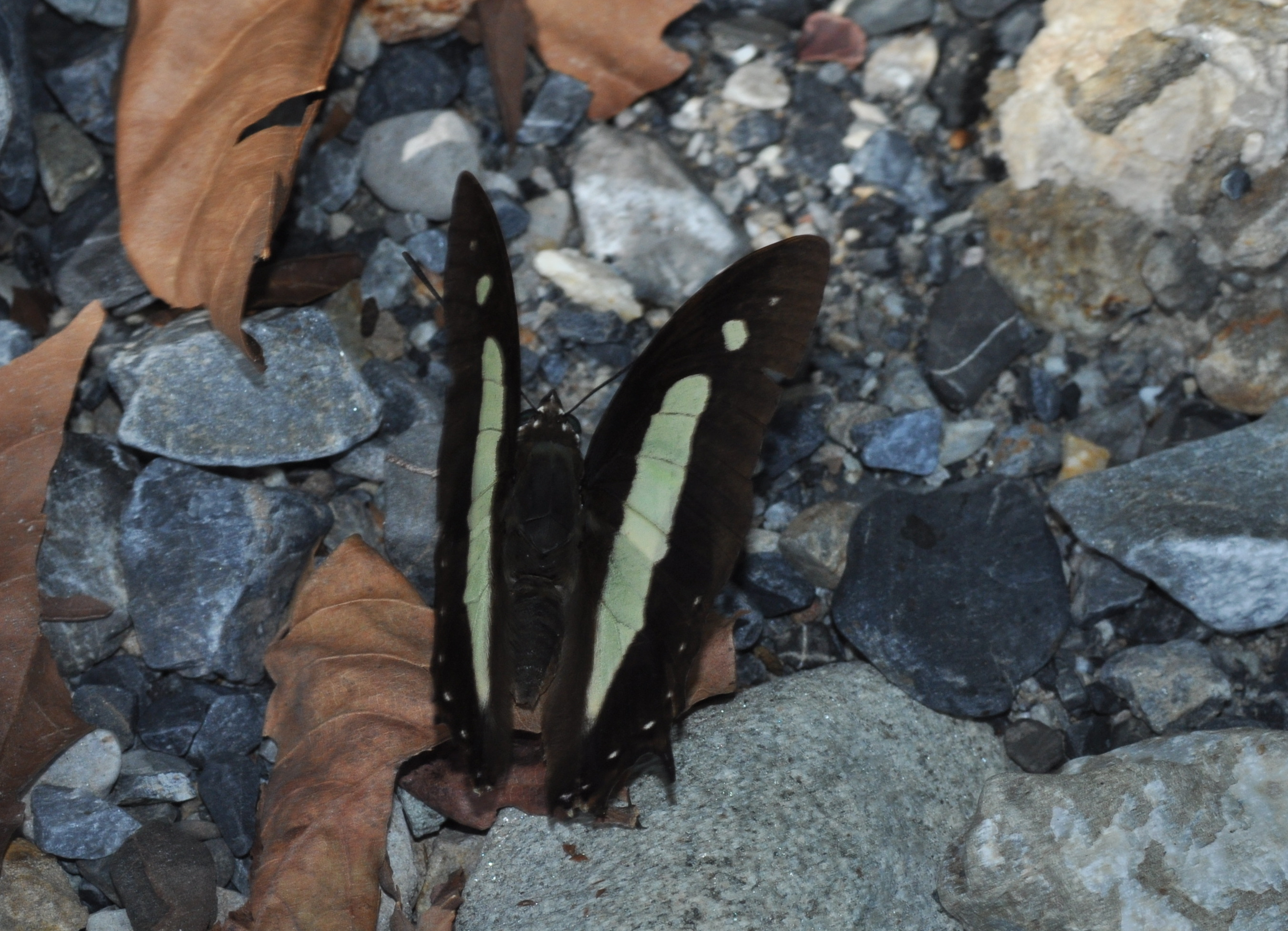
Dorsal view

===== Species: Charaxes eudamippus (great nawab) =====
Subspecies: Charaxes eudamippus eudamippus (Himalayan great nawab)

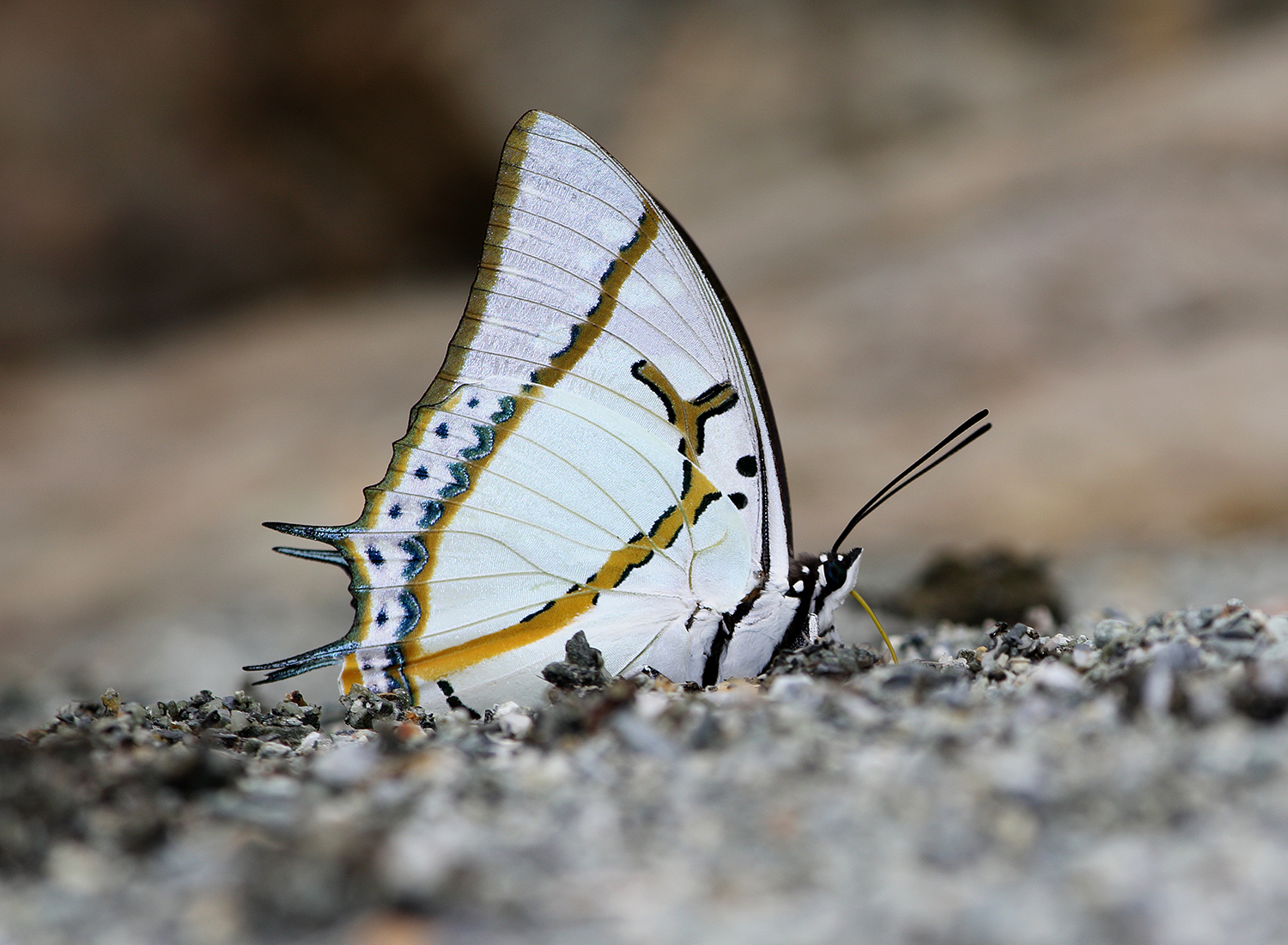
Ventral view

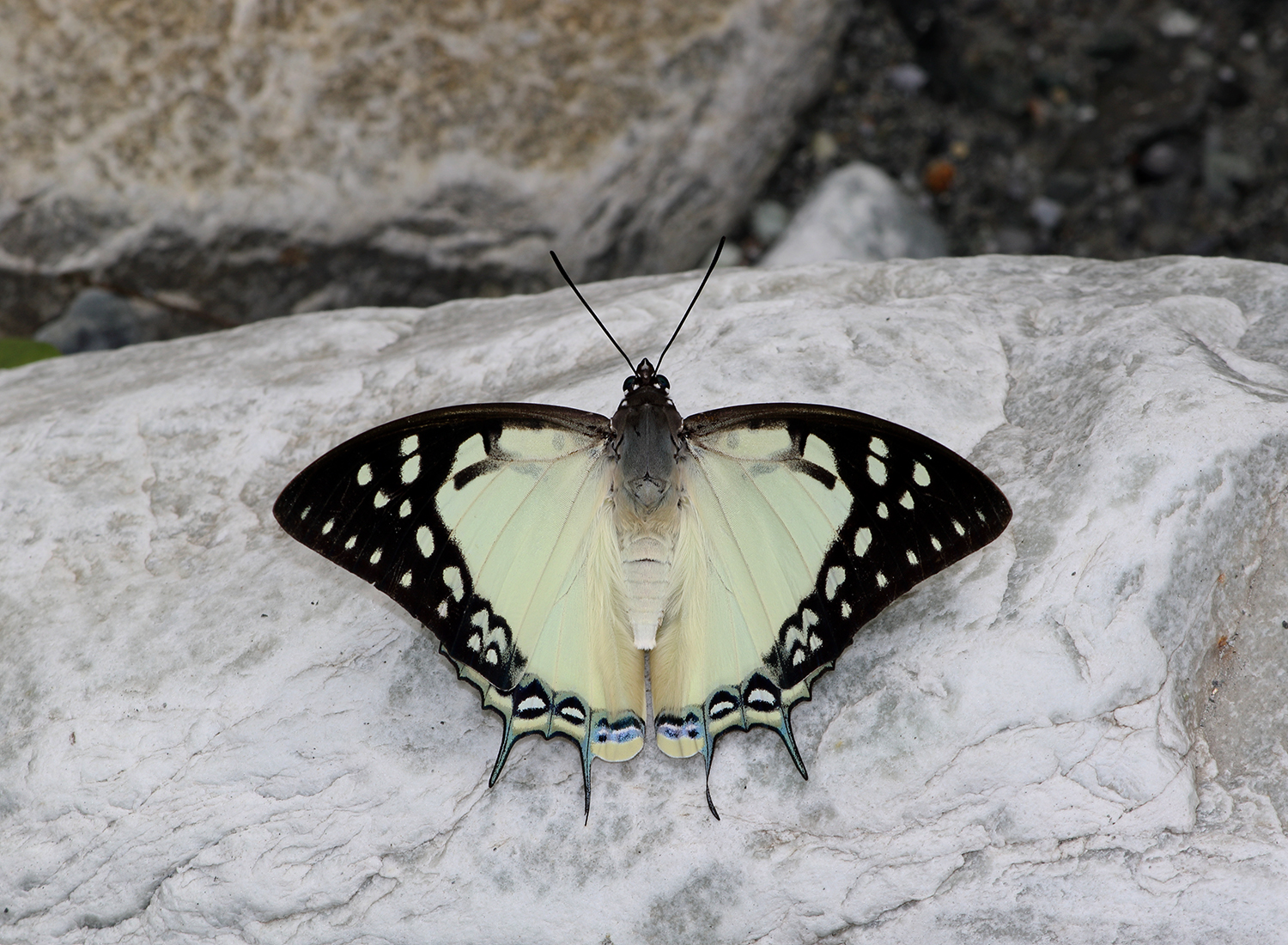
Dorsal view

===== Species: Charaxes marmax (yellow rajah) =====
Subspecies: Charaxes marmax marmax (Sylhet yellow rajah)

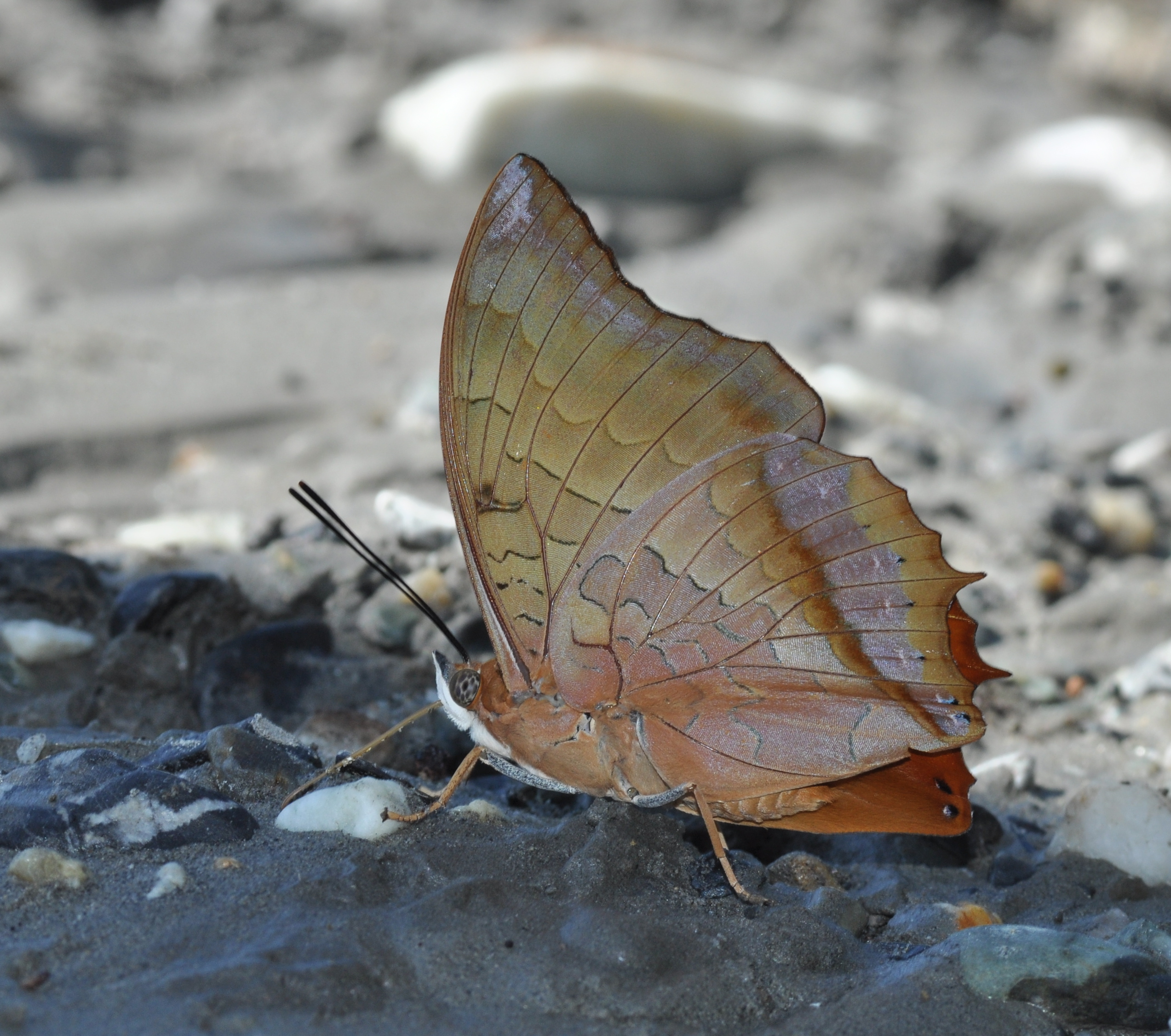
Ventral view

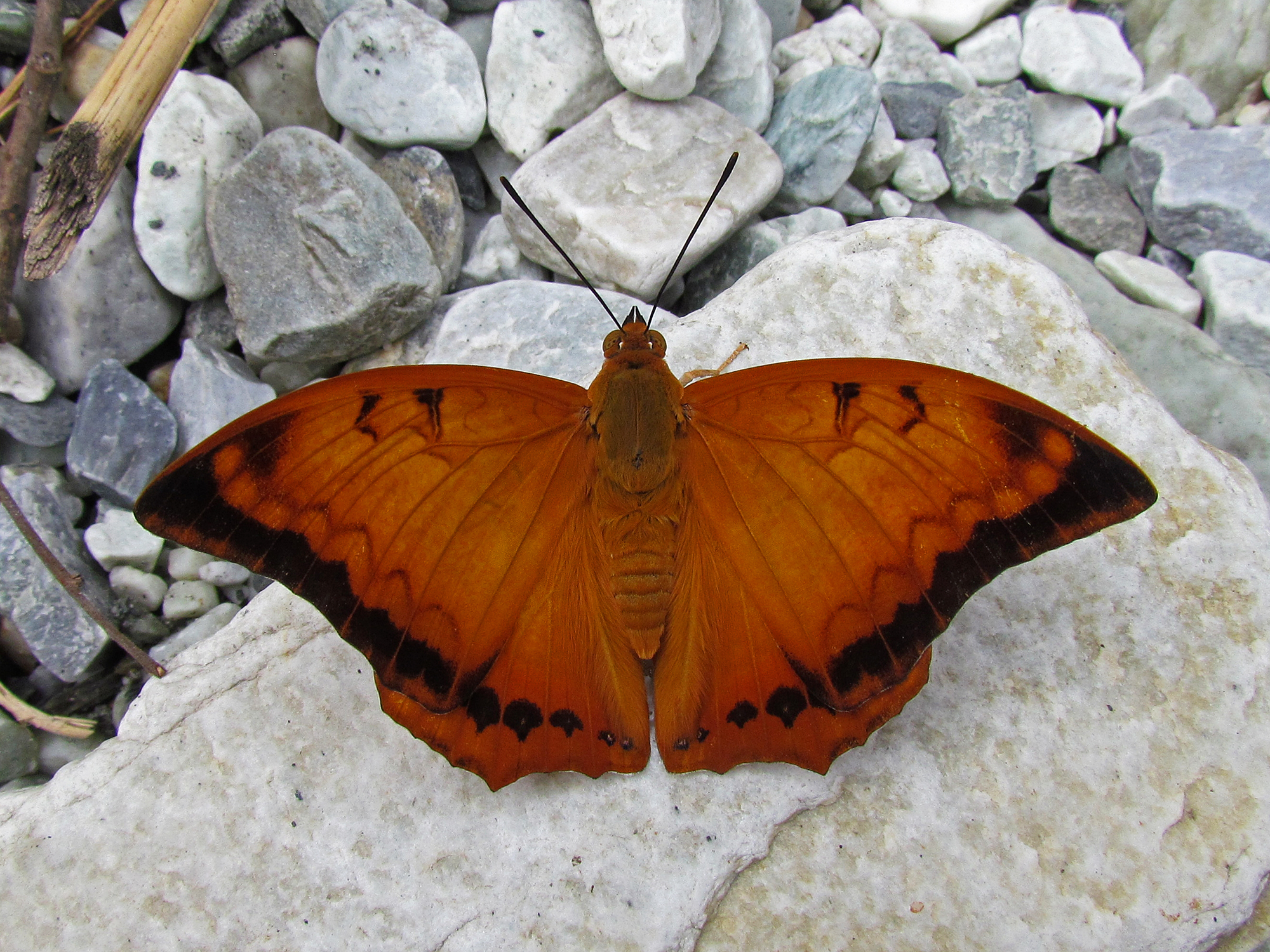
Dorsal view

===== Species: Charaxes solon (black rajah) =====
Subspecies: Charaxes solon solon (pale black rajah)

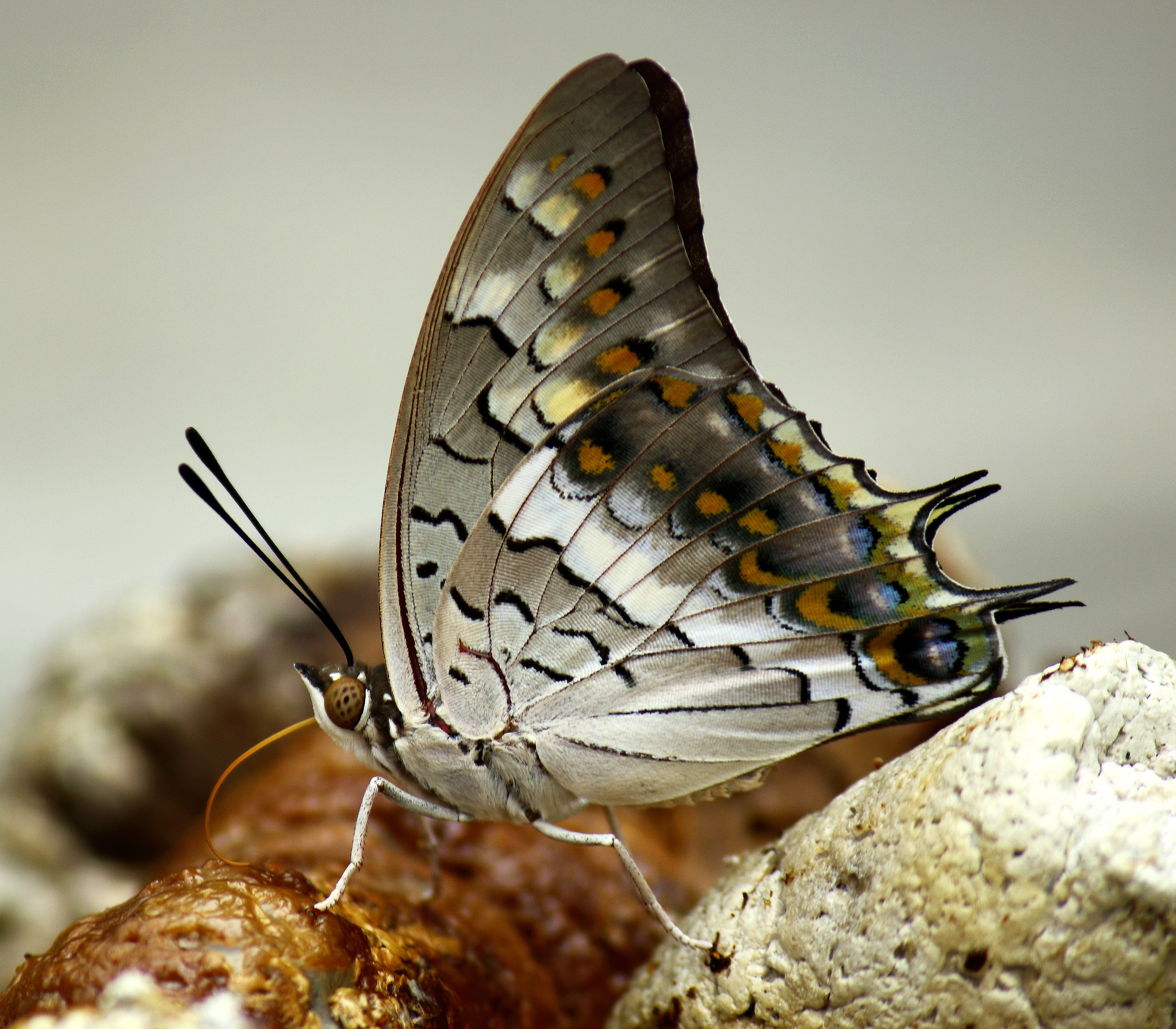
Ventral view

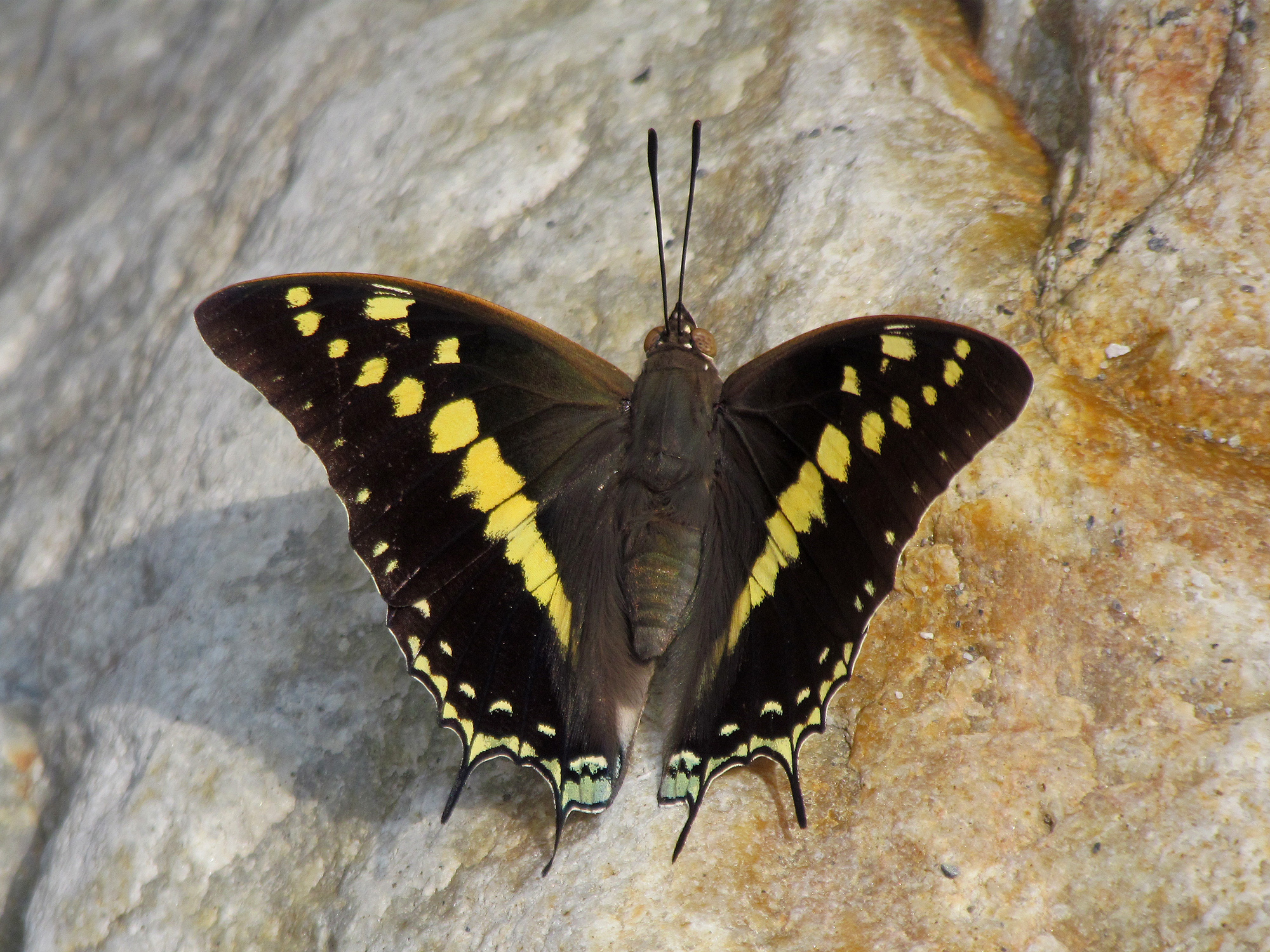
Dorsal view

=== Subfamily: Cyrestinae ===
==== Genus: Cyrestis (maps) ====
===== Species: Cyrestis thyodamas (map butterfly) =====
Subspecies: Cyrestis thyodamas thyodamas (Oriental map butterfly)

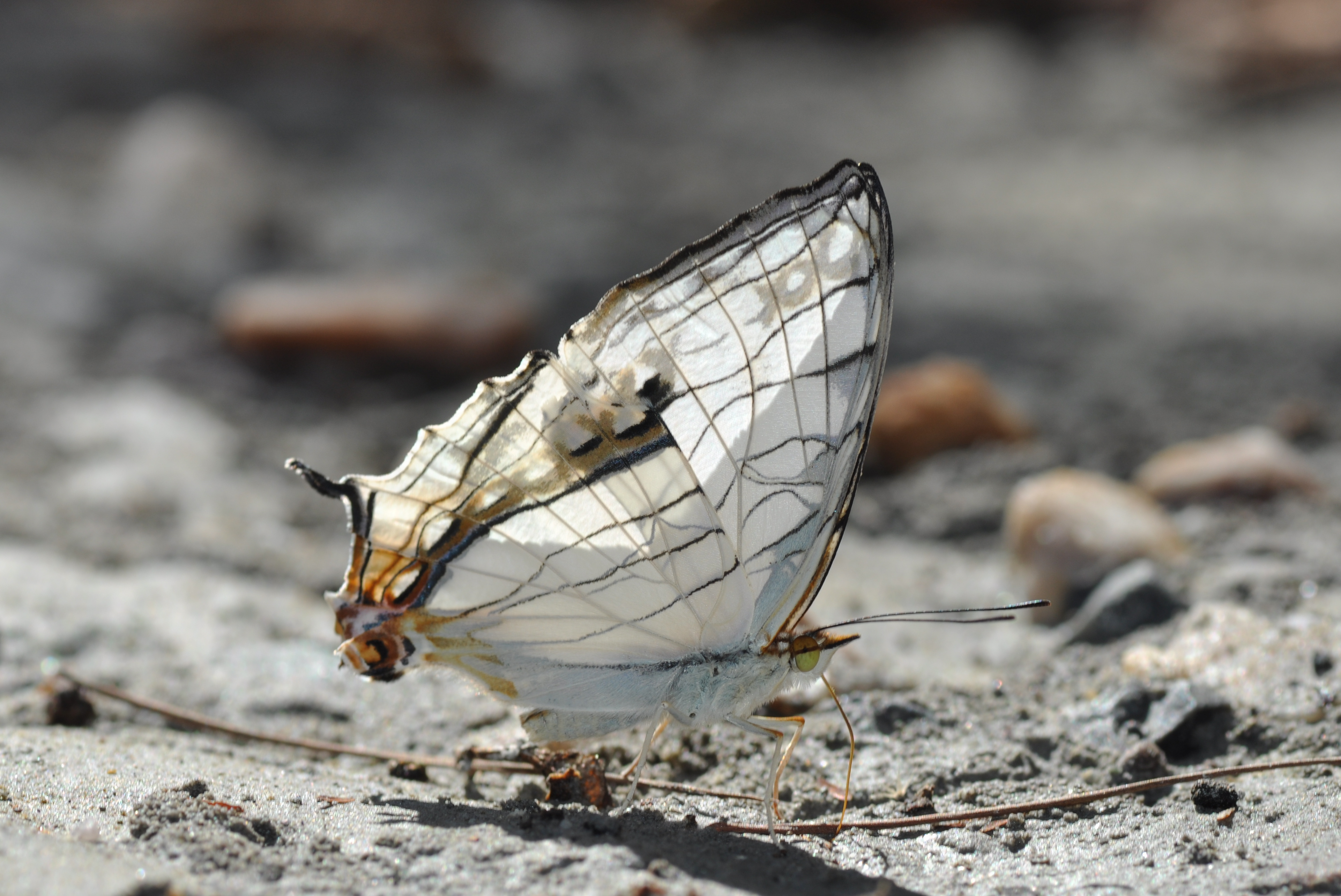
Ventral view

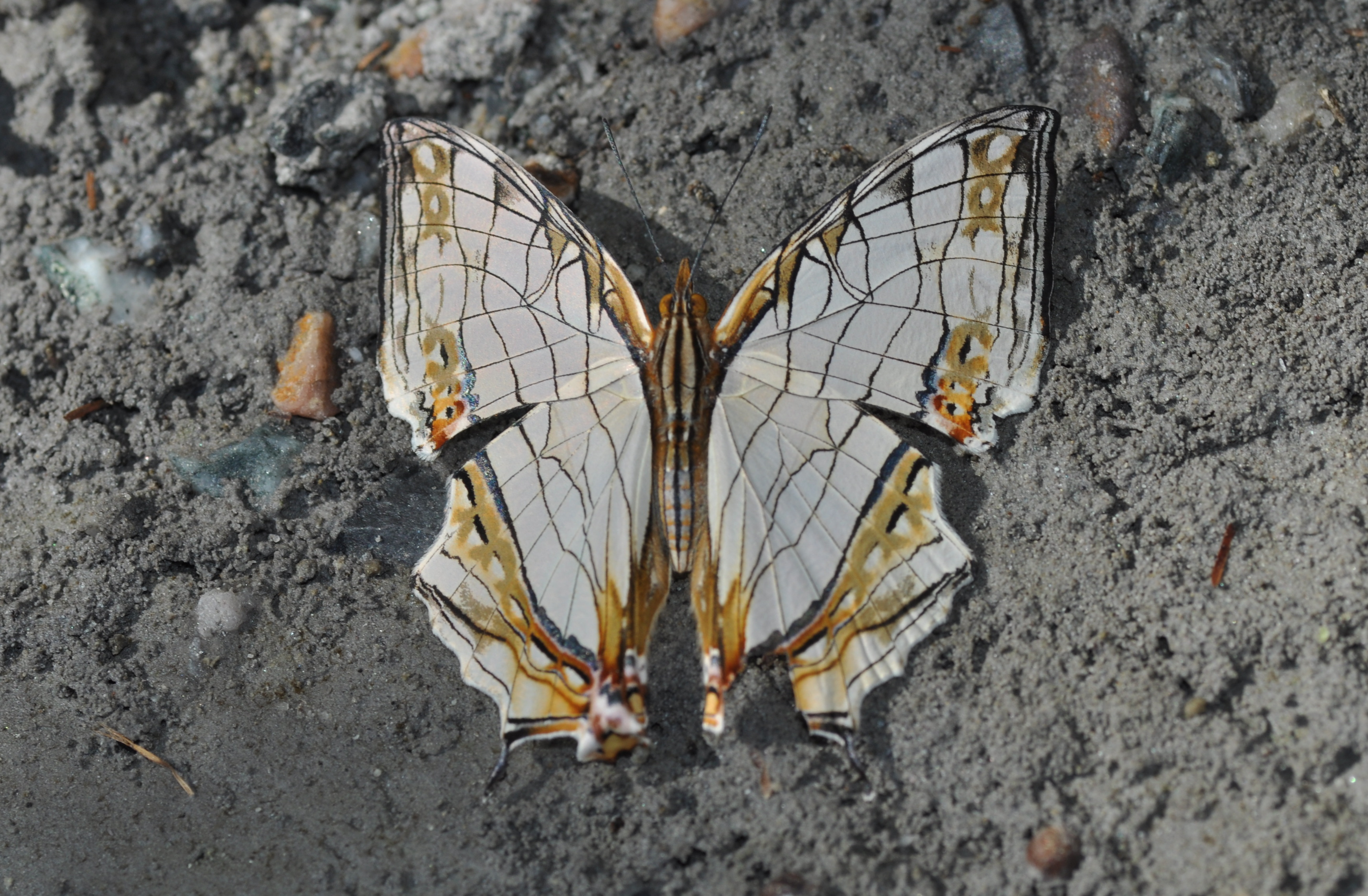
Dorsal view

=== Subfamily: Danainae ===
Tribe: Danaini

==== Genus: Danaus ====
===== Species: Danaus chrysippus (plain tiger) =====
Subspecies: Danaus chrysippus chrysippus (Oriental plain tiger)

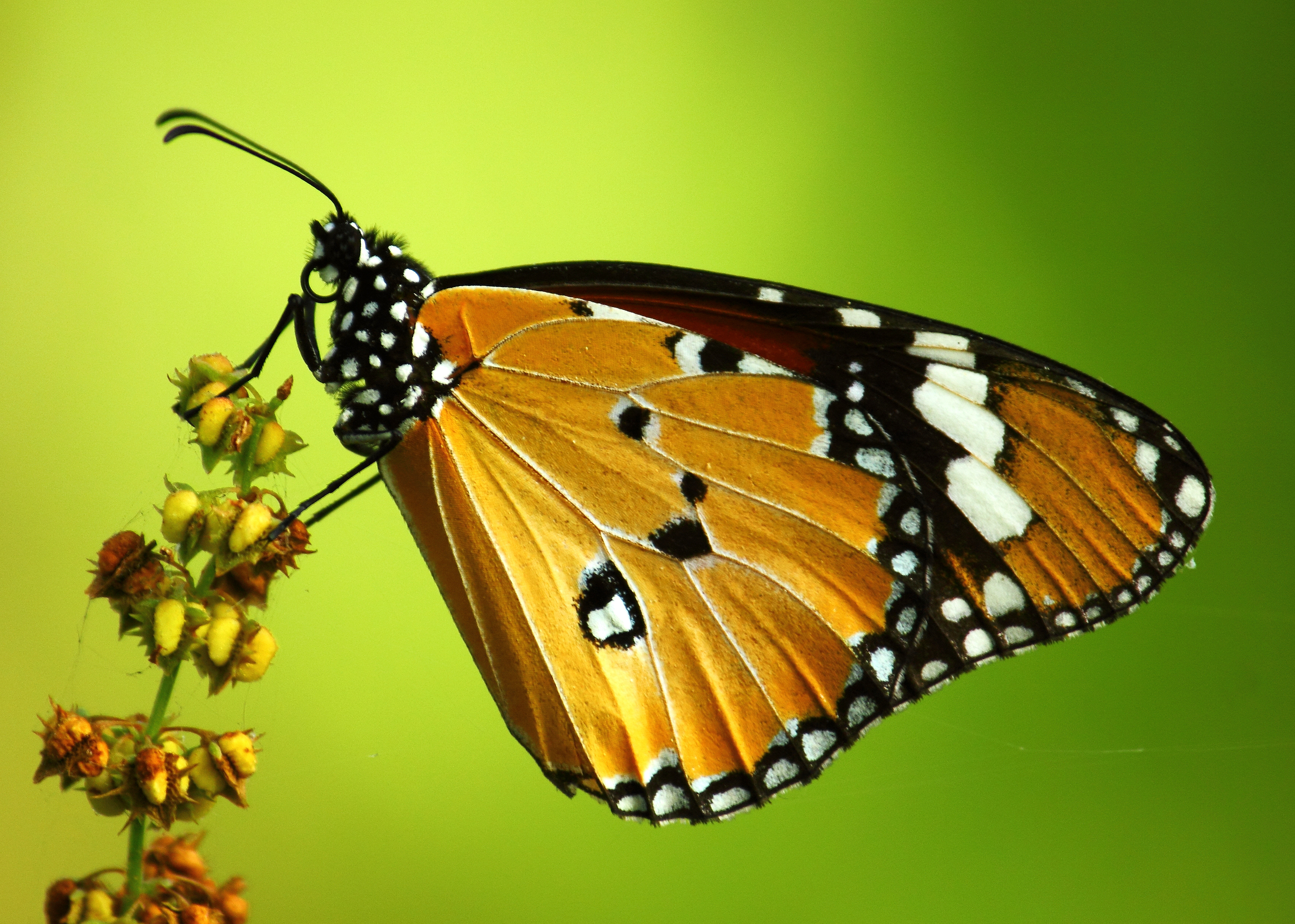
Ventral view

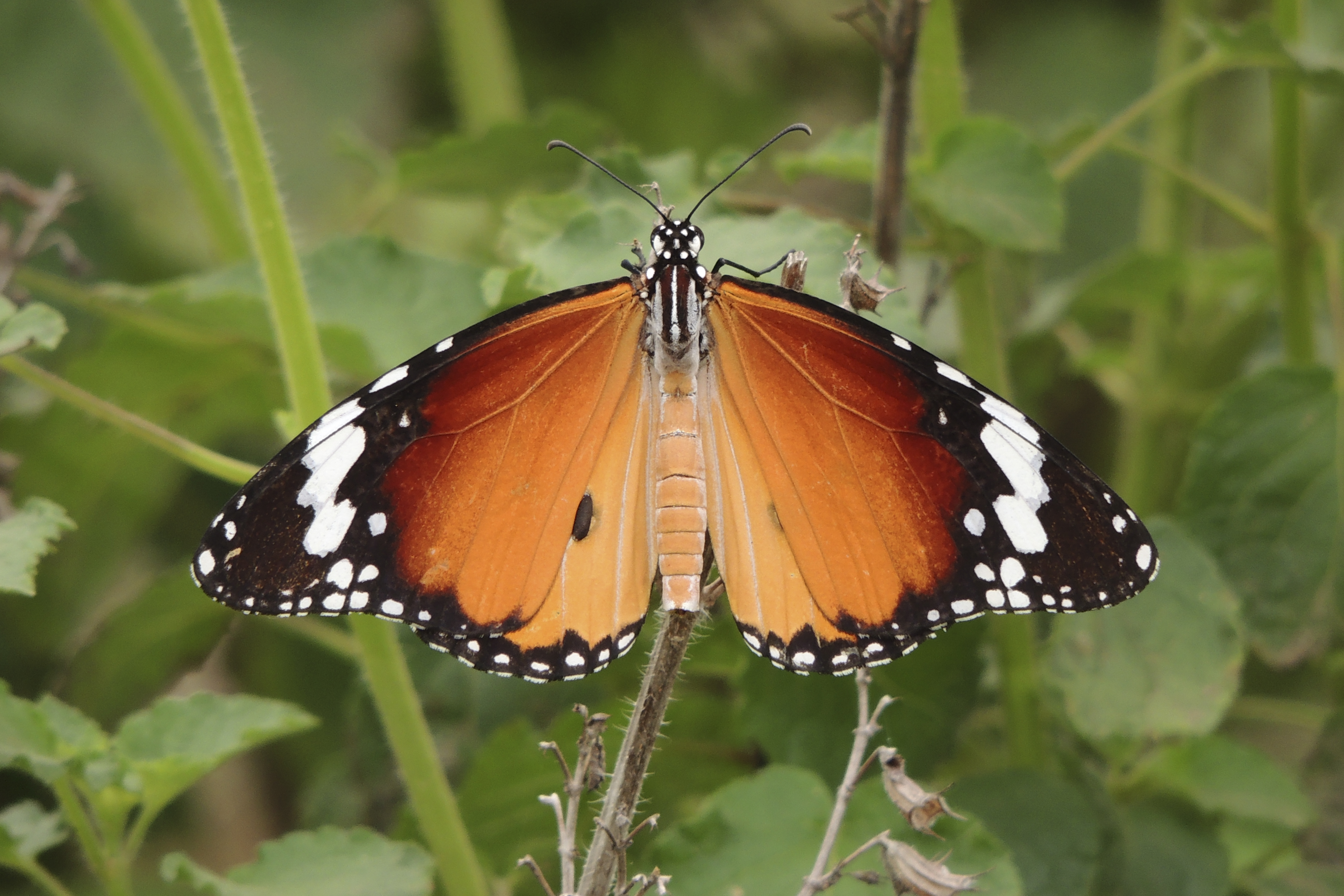
Dorsal view

===== Species: Danaus genutia (striped tiger) =====
Subspecies: Danaus genutia genutia (Oriental striped tiger)

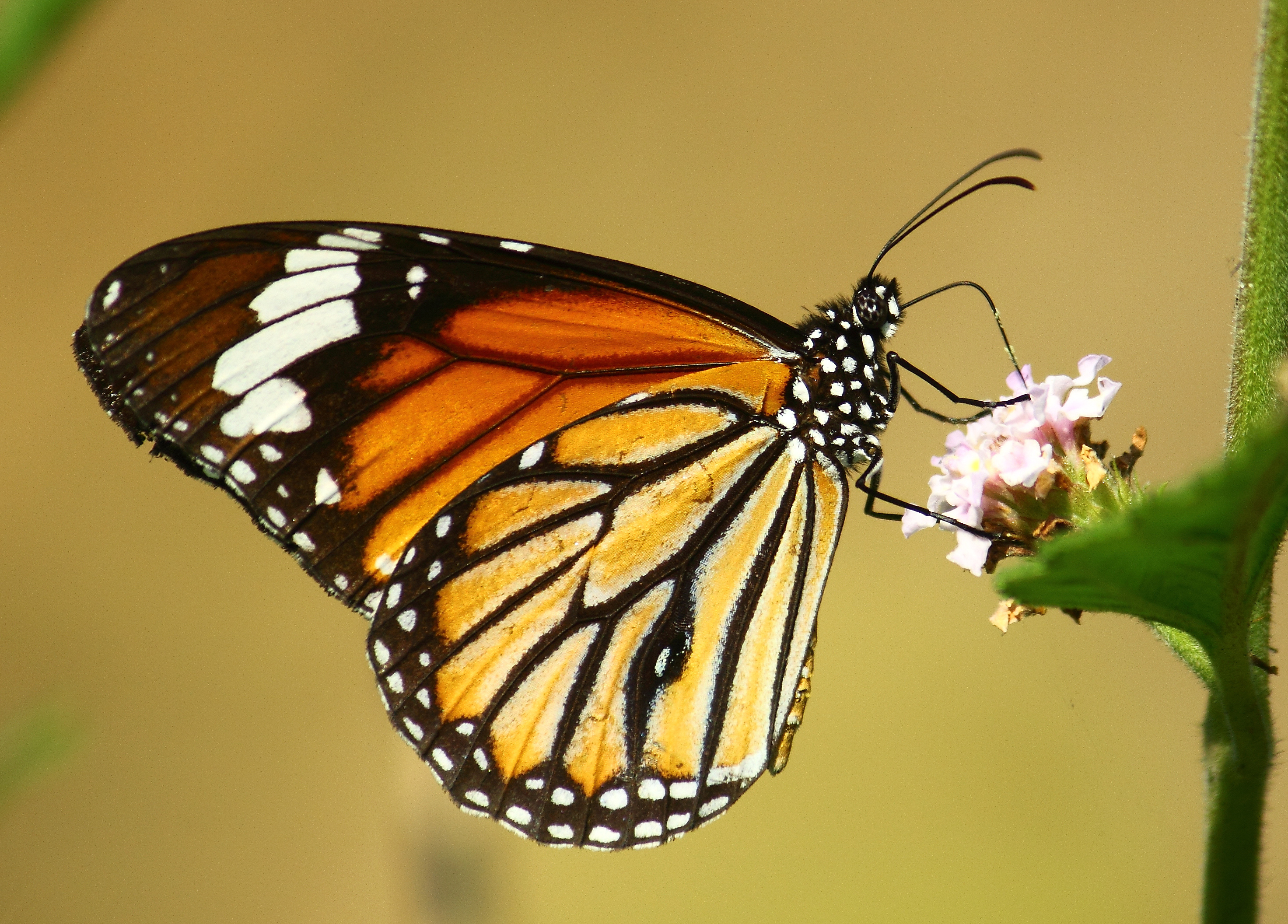
Ventral view

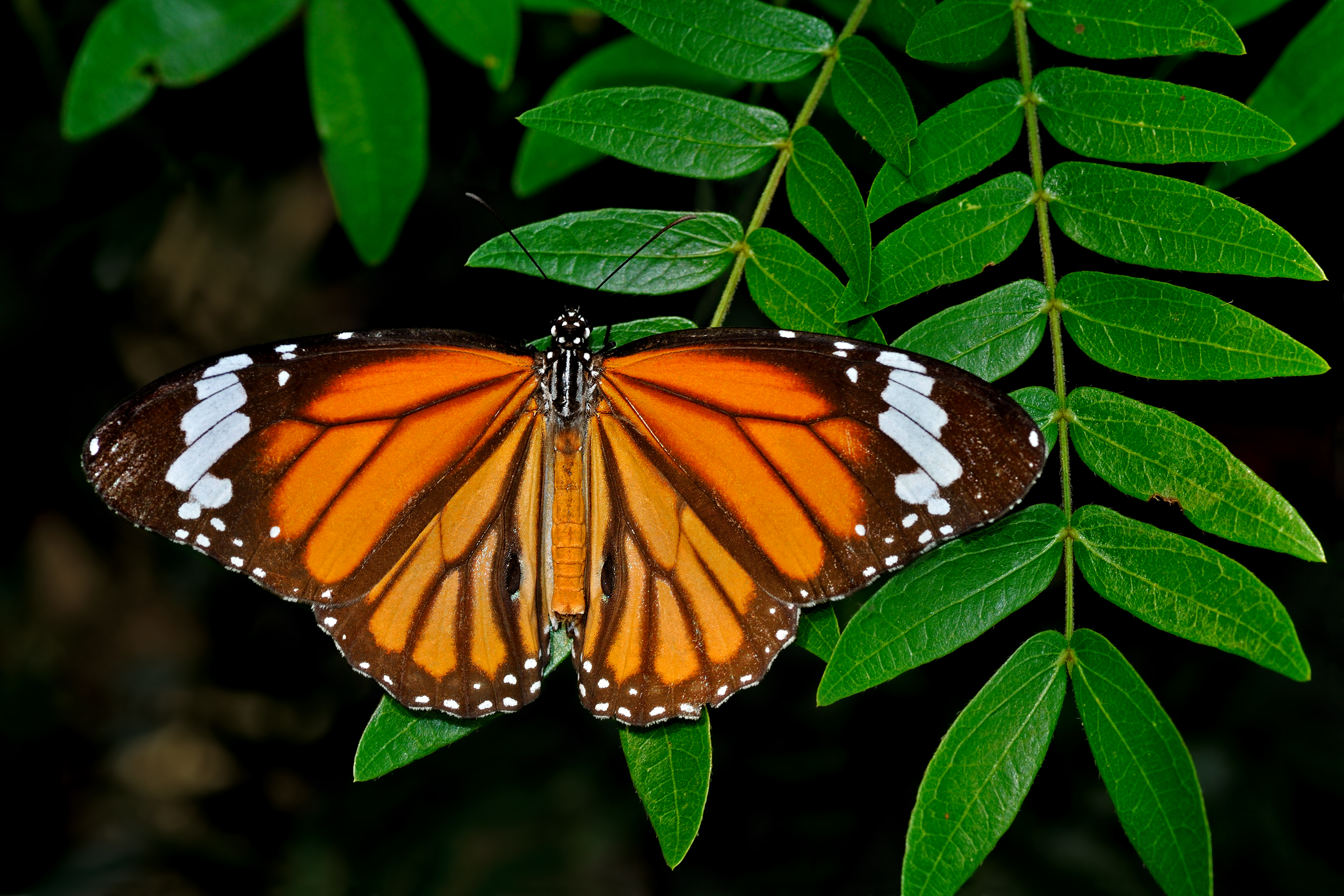
Dorsal view

===== Species: Euploea klugii (king crow) =====
Subspecies: Euploea klugii kollari (brown king crow)

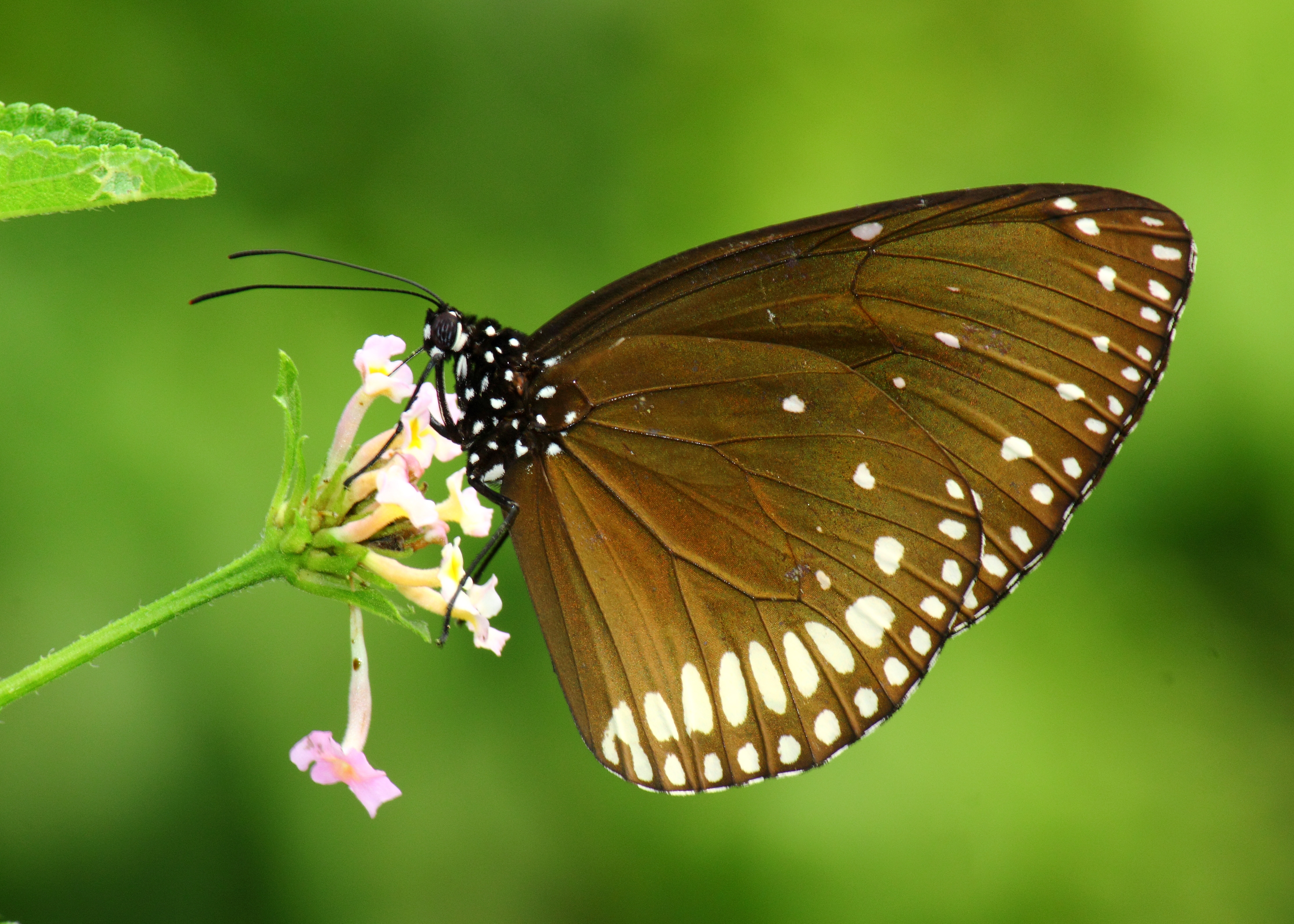
Ventral view

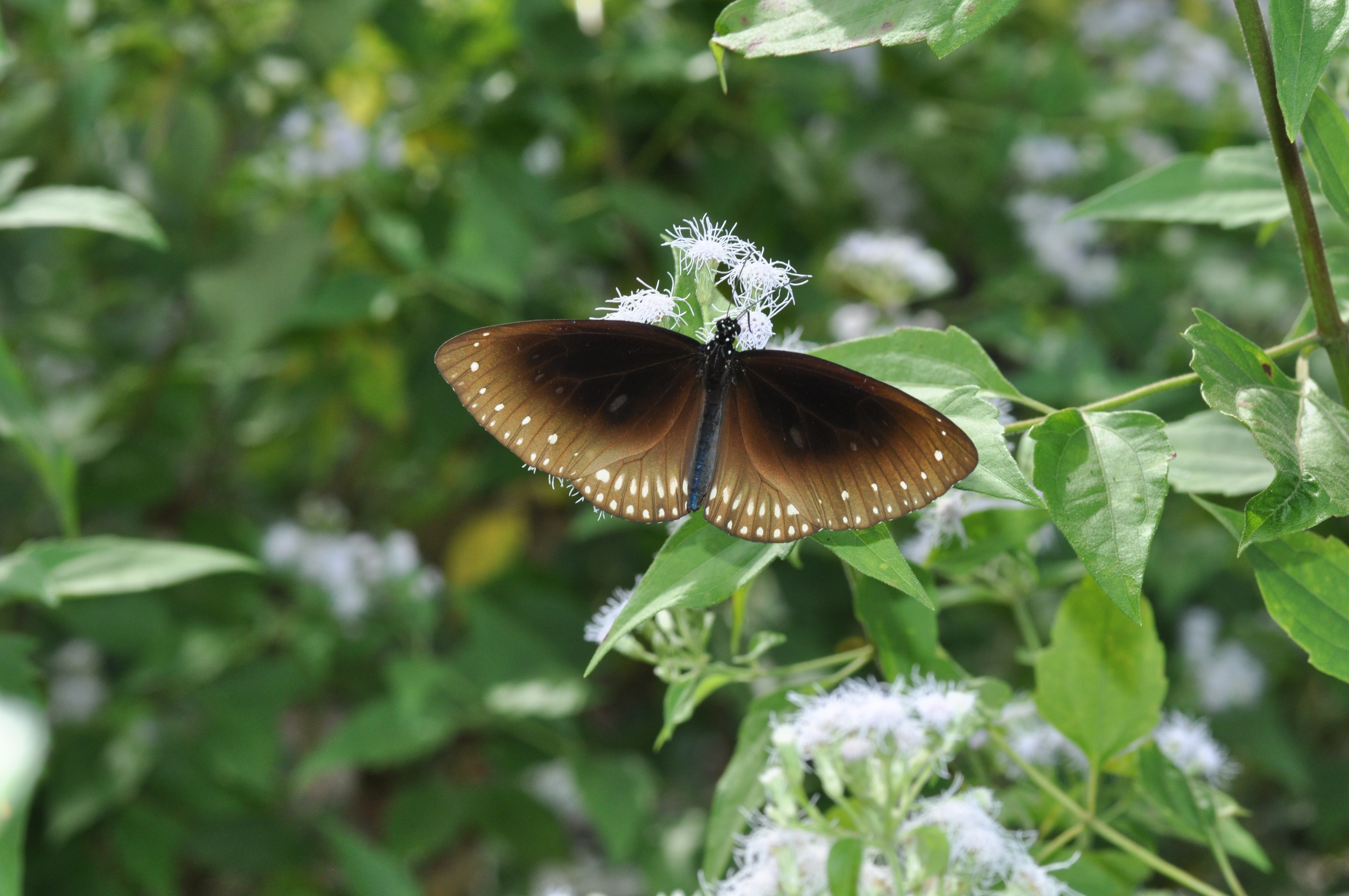
Dorsal view

===== Species: Euploea radamanthus (magpie crow) =====
Subspecies: Euploea radamanthus radamanthus (Oriental magpie crow)

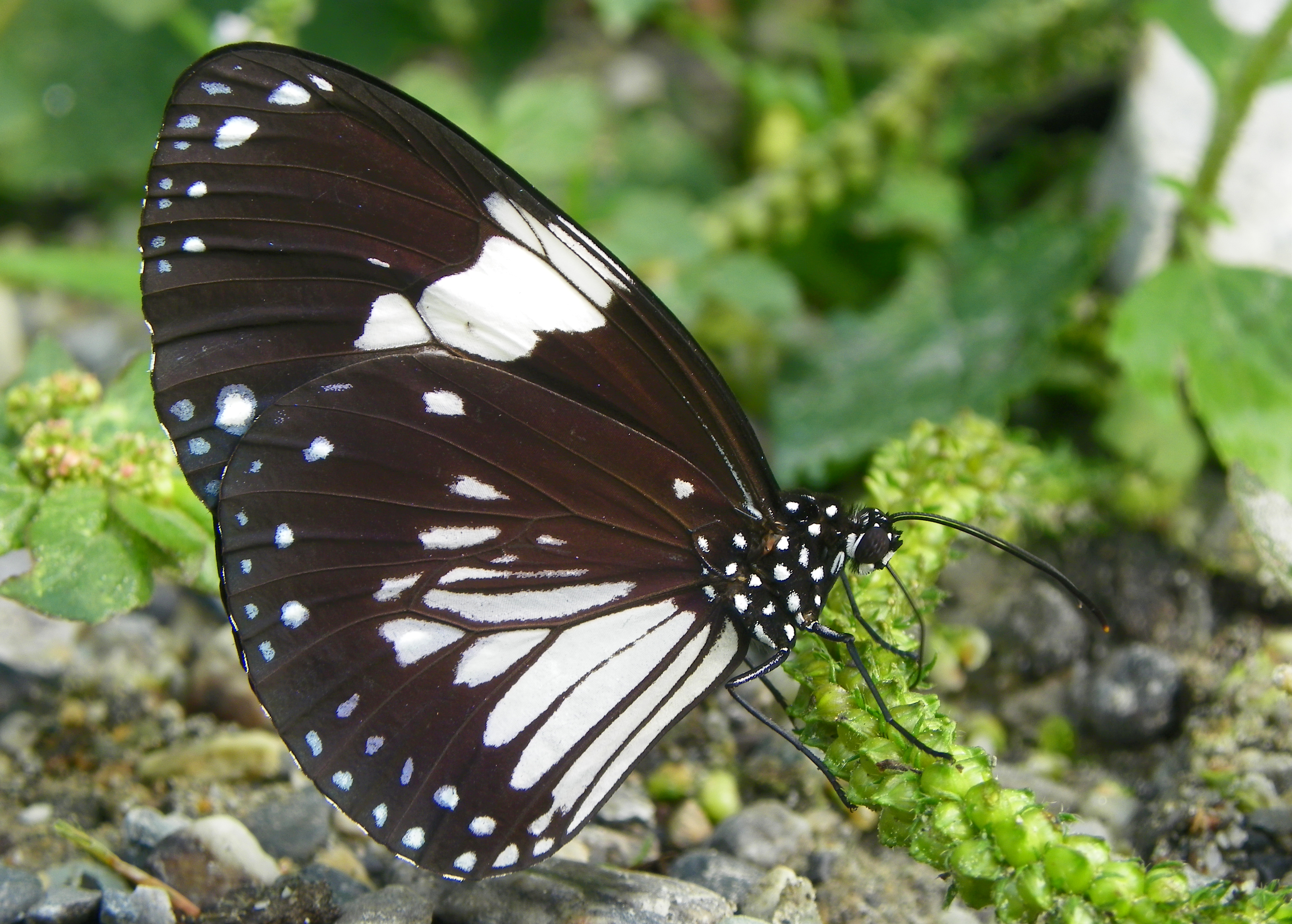
Ventral view

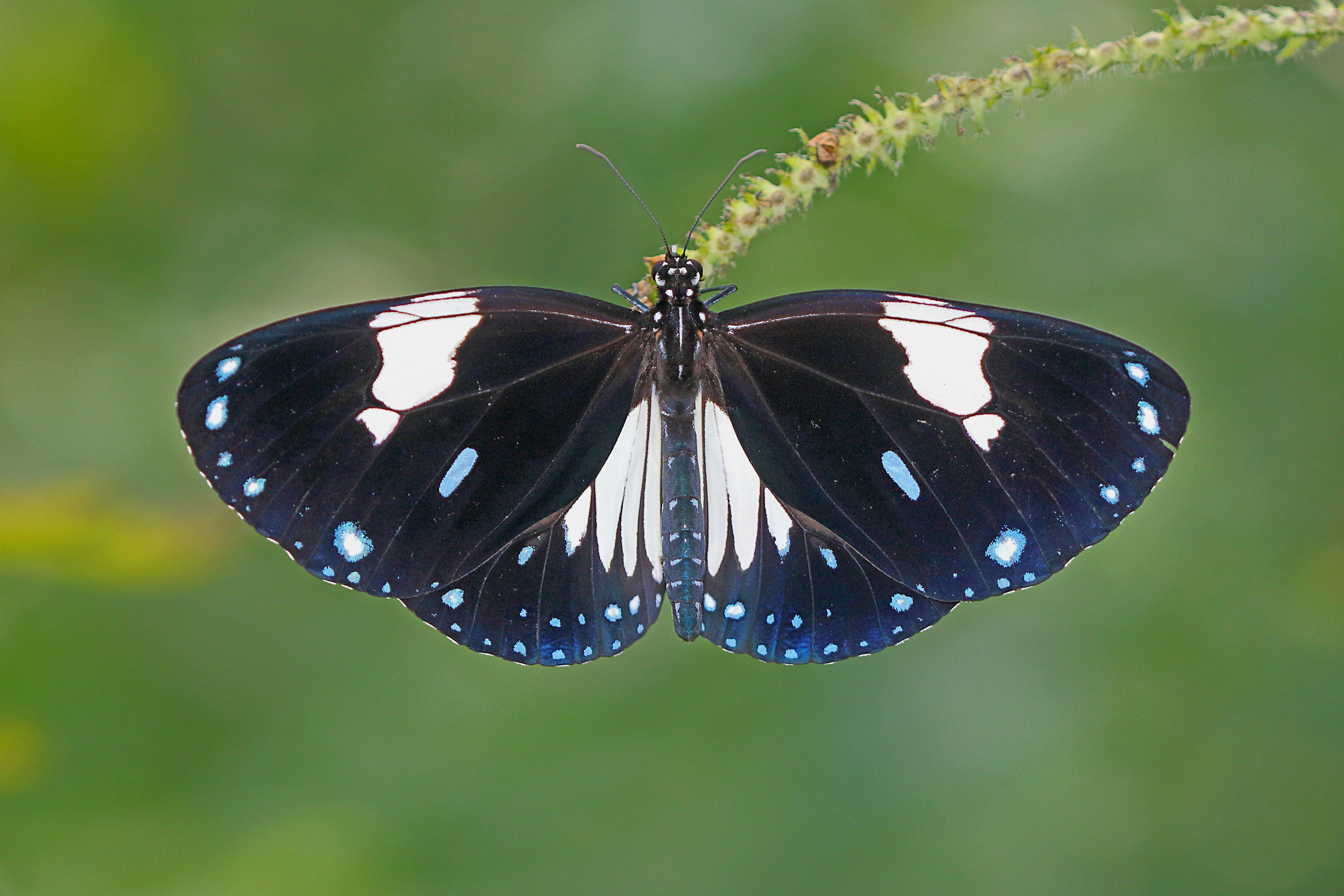
Dorsal view

===== Species: Euploea sylvester (magpie crow) =====
Subspecies: Euploea sylvester hopei (Cachar double-branded blue crow)

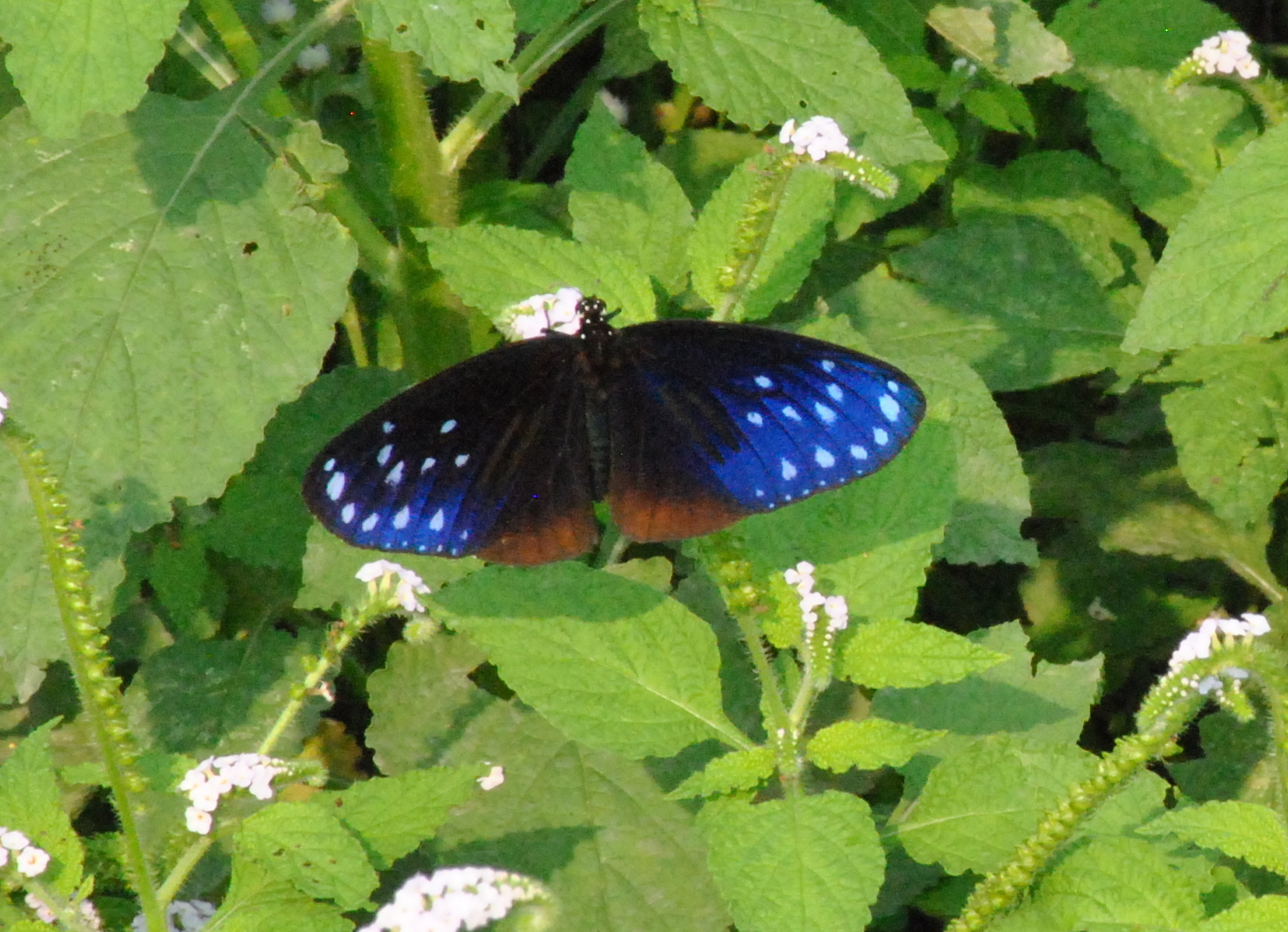
Dorsal view

===== Species: Euploea mulciber (striped blue crow) =====
Subspecies: Euploea mulciber mulciber (Bengal striped blue crow)

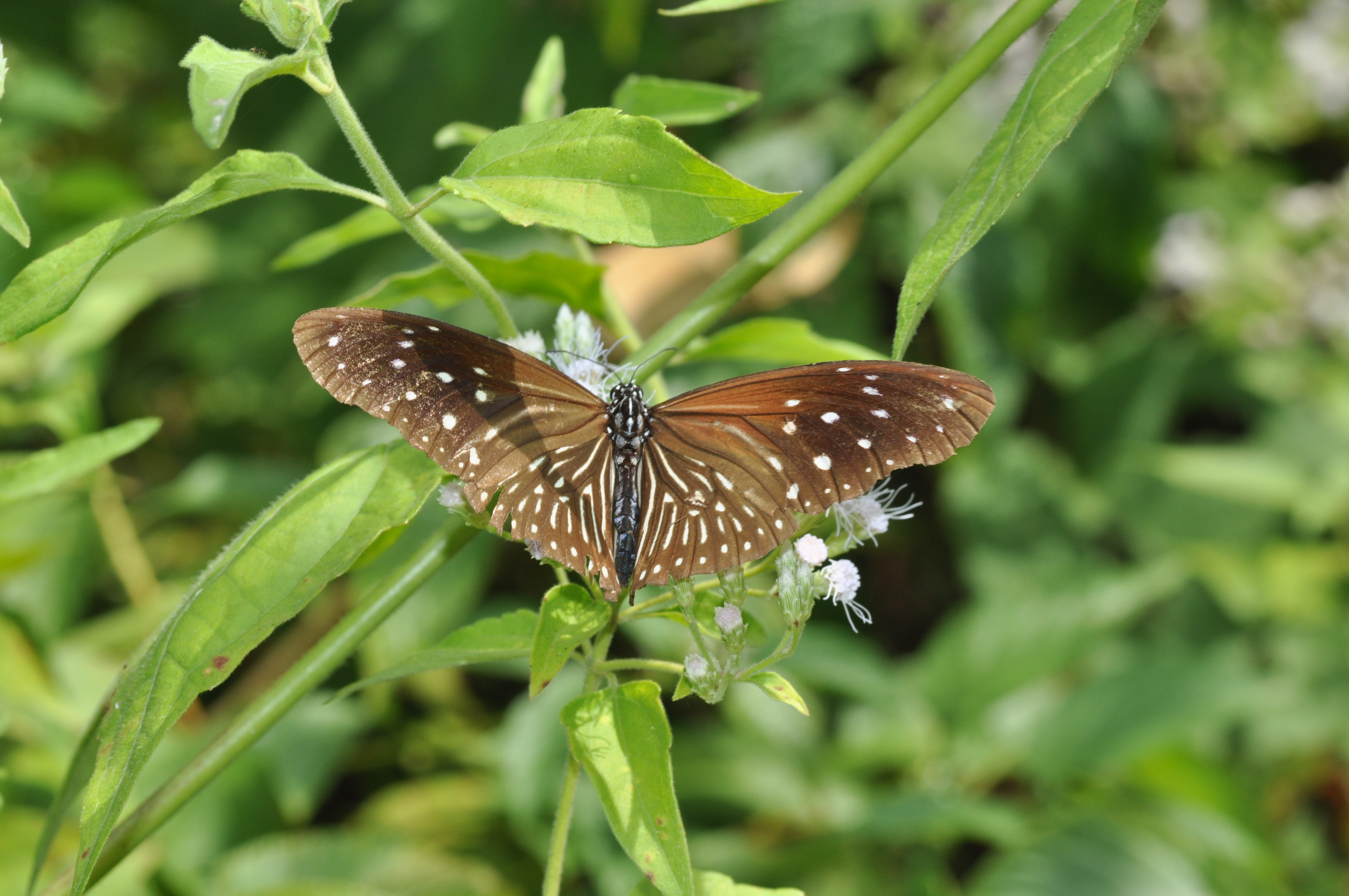
Dorsal view (female)

==== Genus: Parantica ====
===== Species: Parantica aglea (glassy tiger) =====
Subspecies: Parantica aglea melanoides (Himalayan glassy tiger)

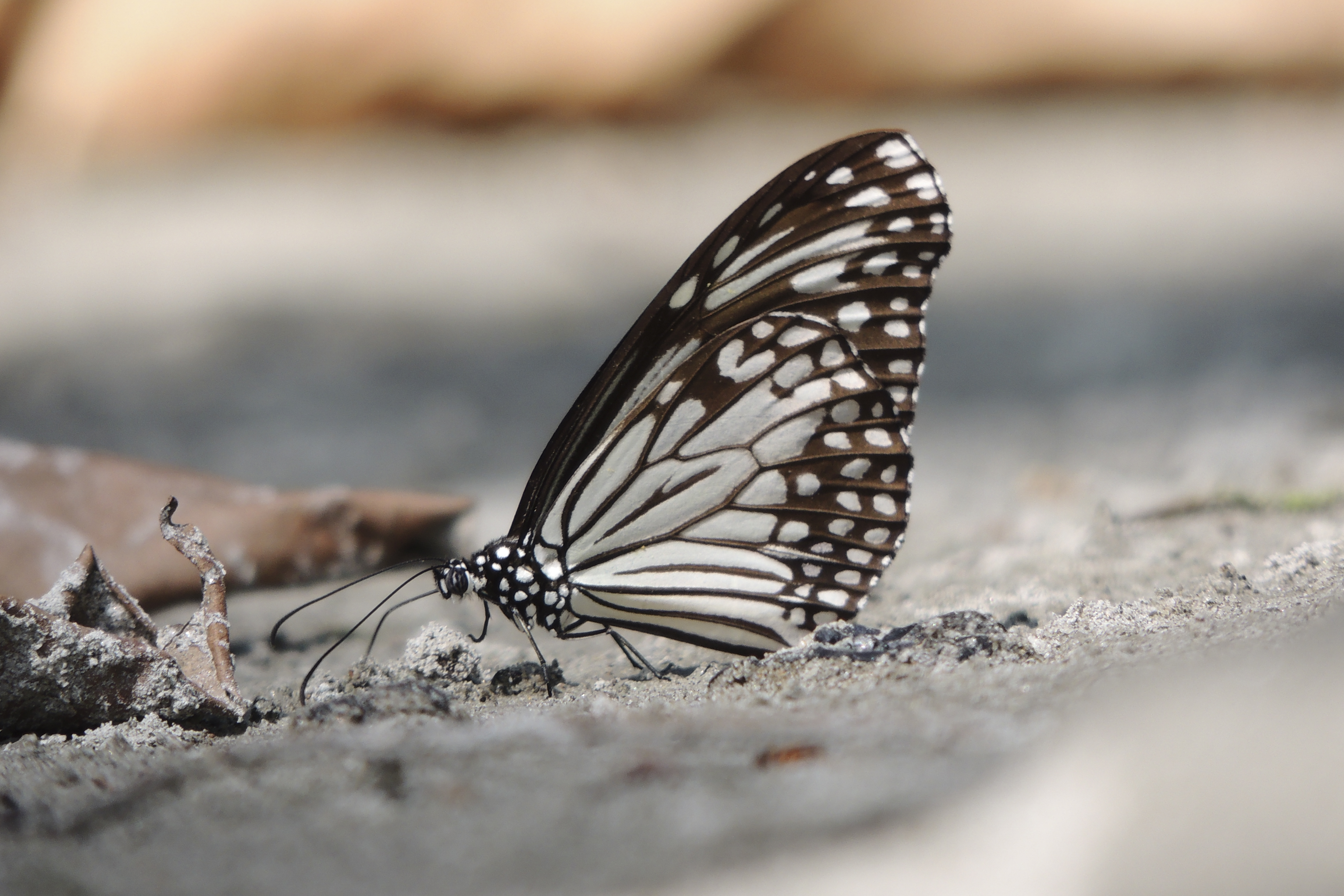
Ventral view

===== Species: Parantica melaneus (chocolate tiger) =====
Subspecies: Parantica melaneus plataniston (Himalayan chocolate tiger)

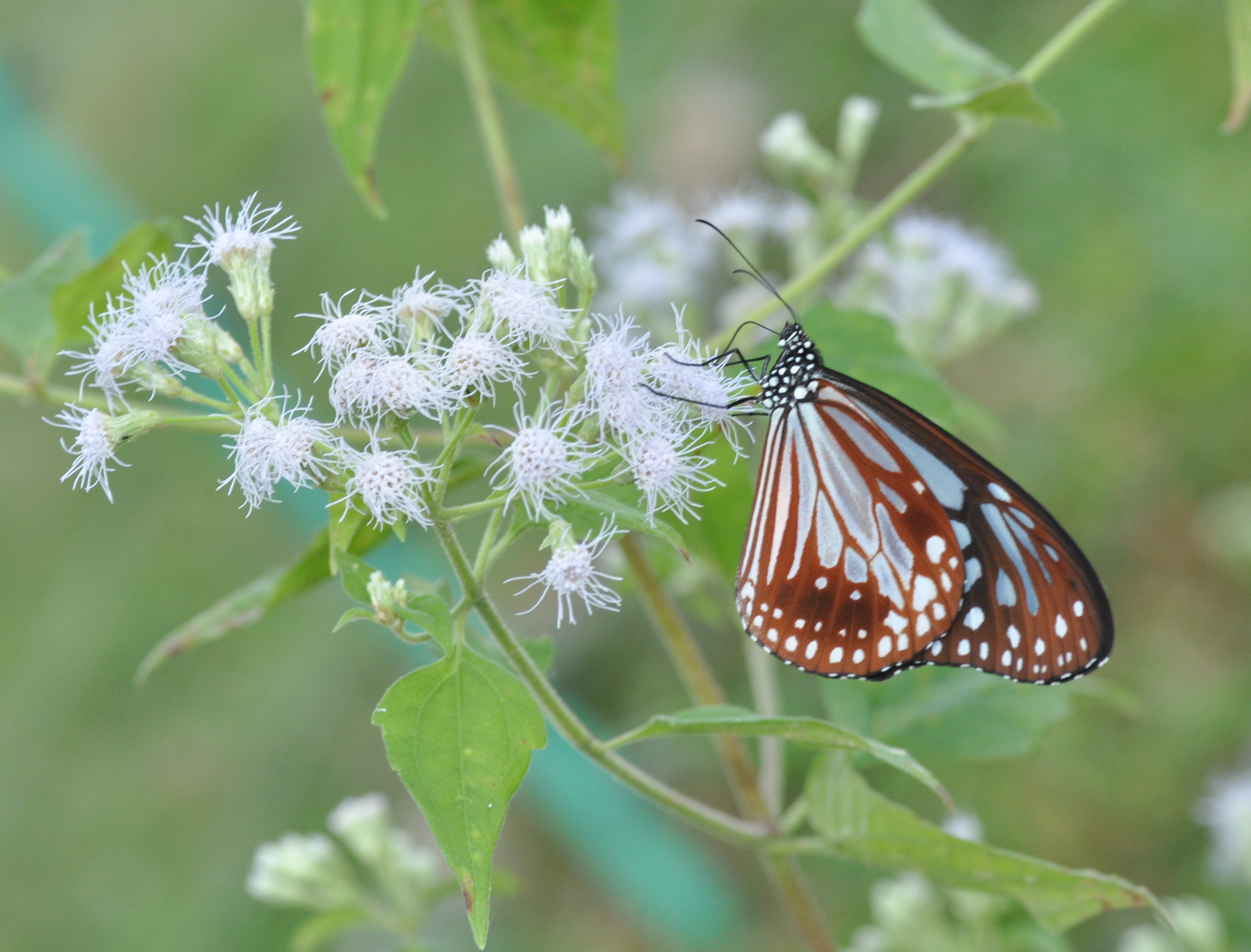
Ventral view

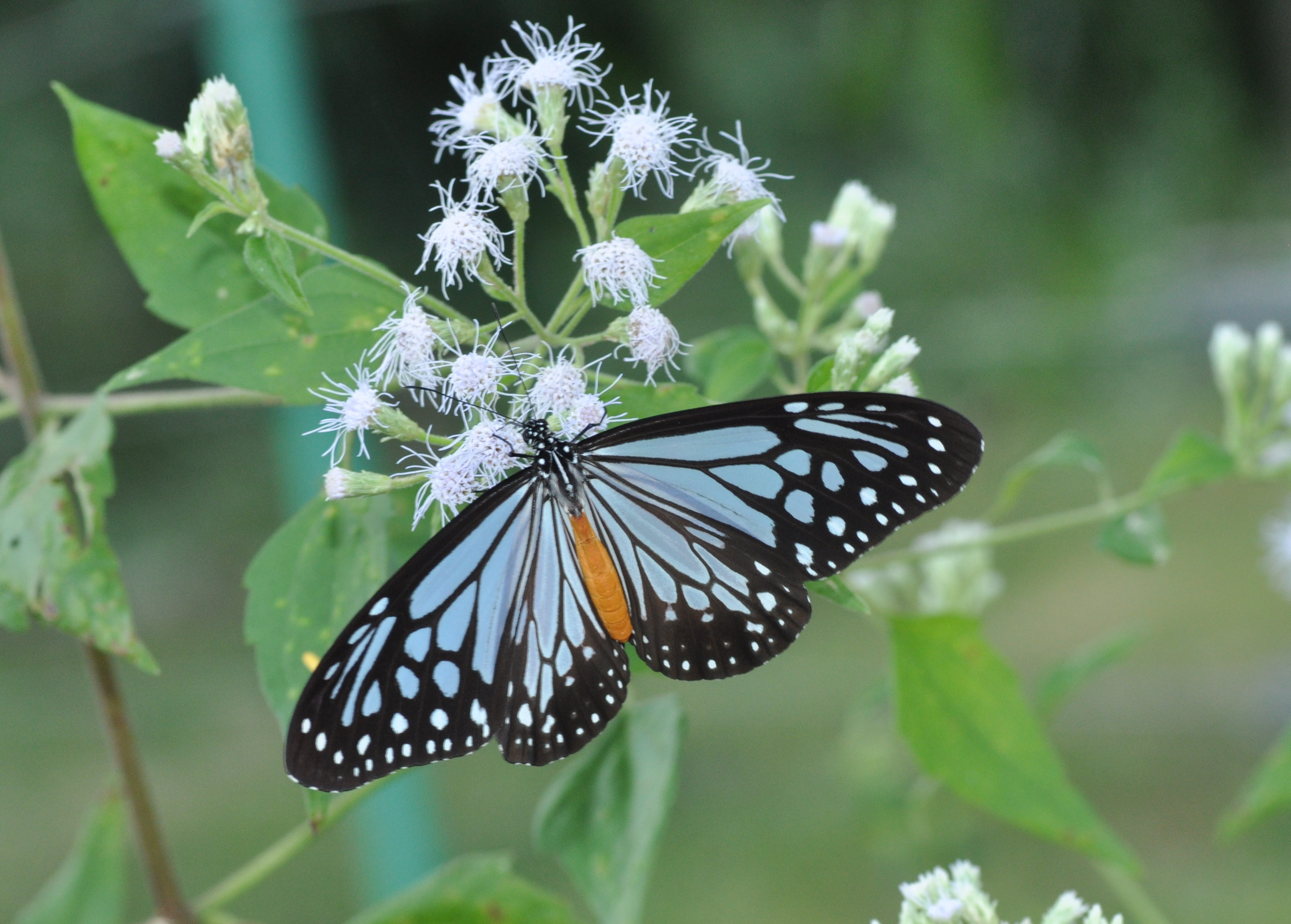
Dorsal view

==== Genus: Tirumala ====
===== Species: Tirumala limniace (blue tiger) =====
Subspecies: Tirumala limniace exoticus (Oriental blue tiger)

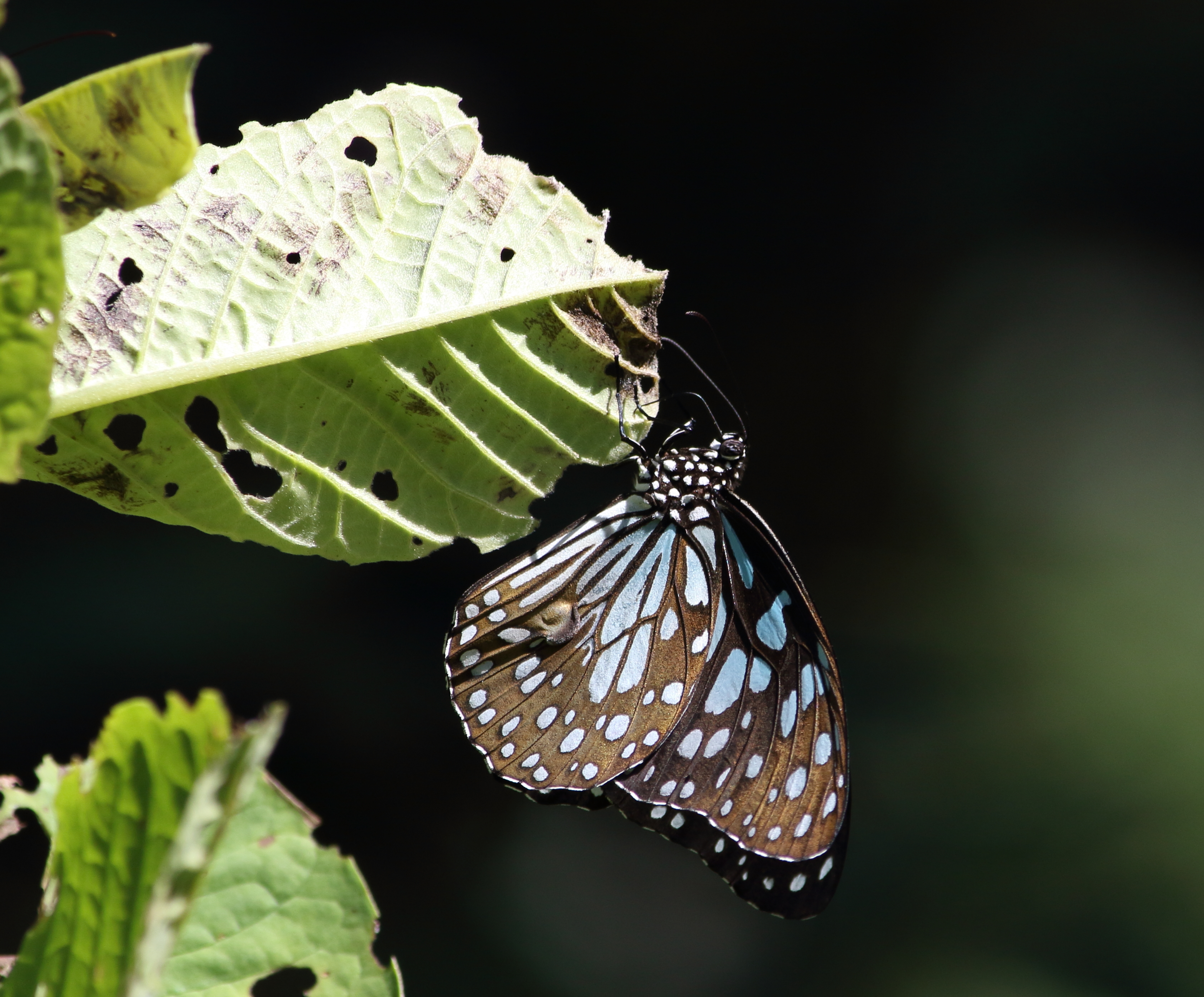
Ventral view

===== Species: Tirumala septentrionis (dark blue tiger) =====
Subspecies: Tirumala septentrionis septentrionis (Oriental dark blue tiger)

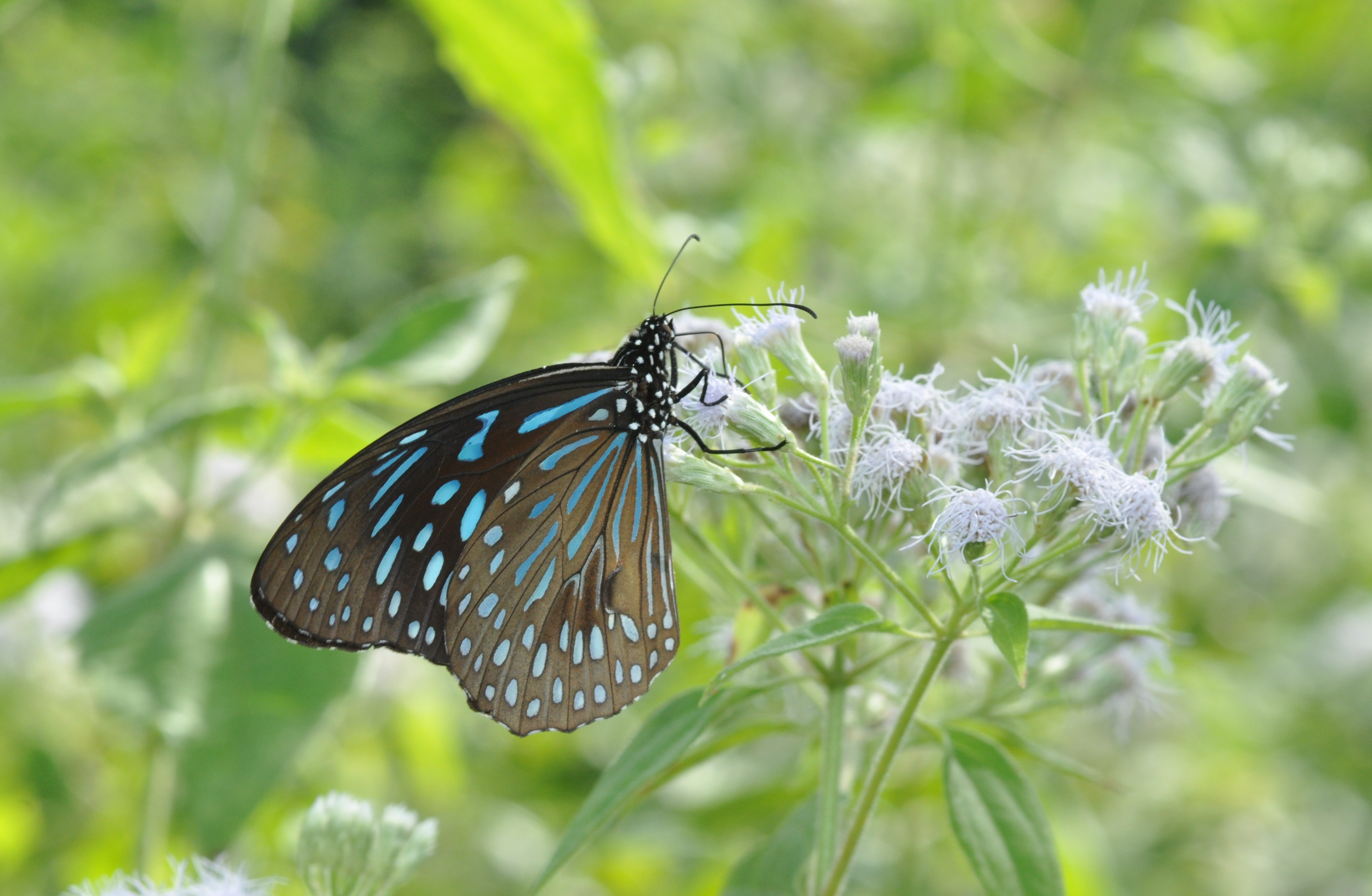
Ventral view

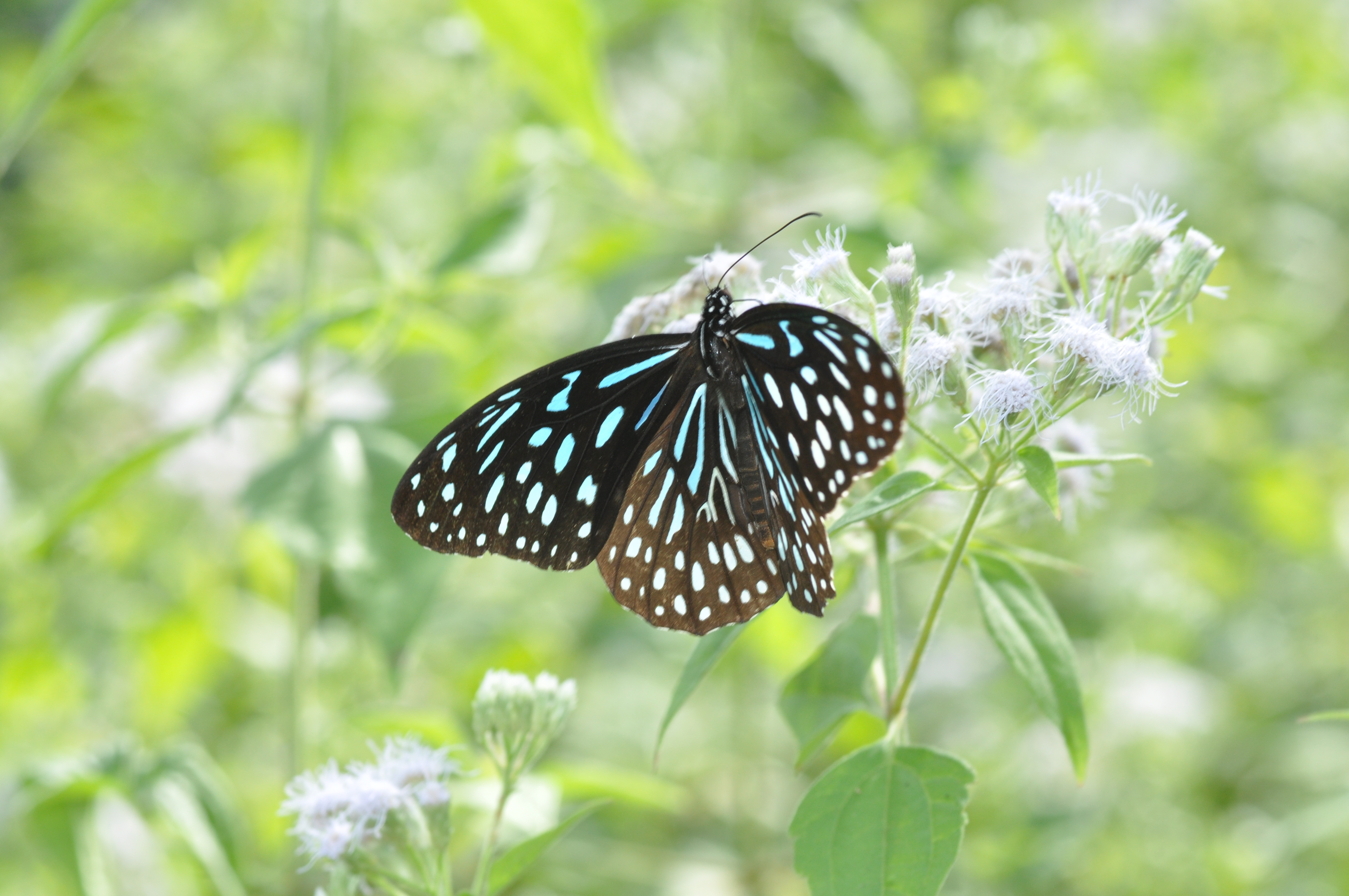
Dorsal view

=== Subfamily: Heliconiinae ===
Tribe: Acraeini

==== Genus: Acraea ====
===== Species: Acraea terpsicore (tawny coster) =====
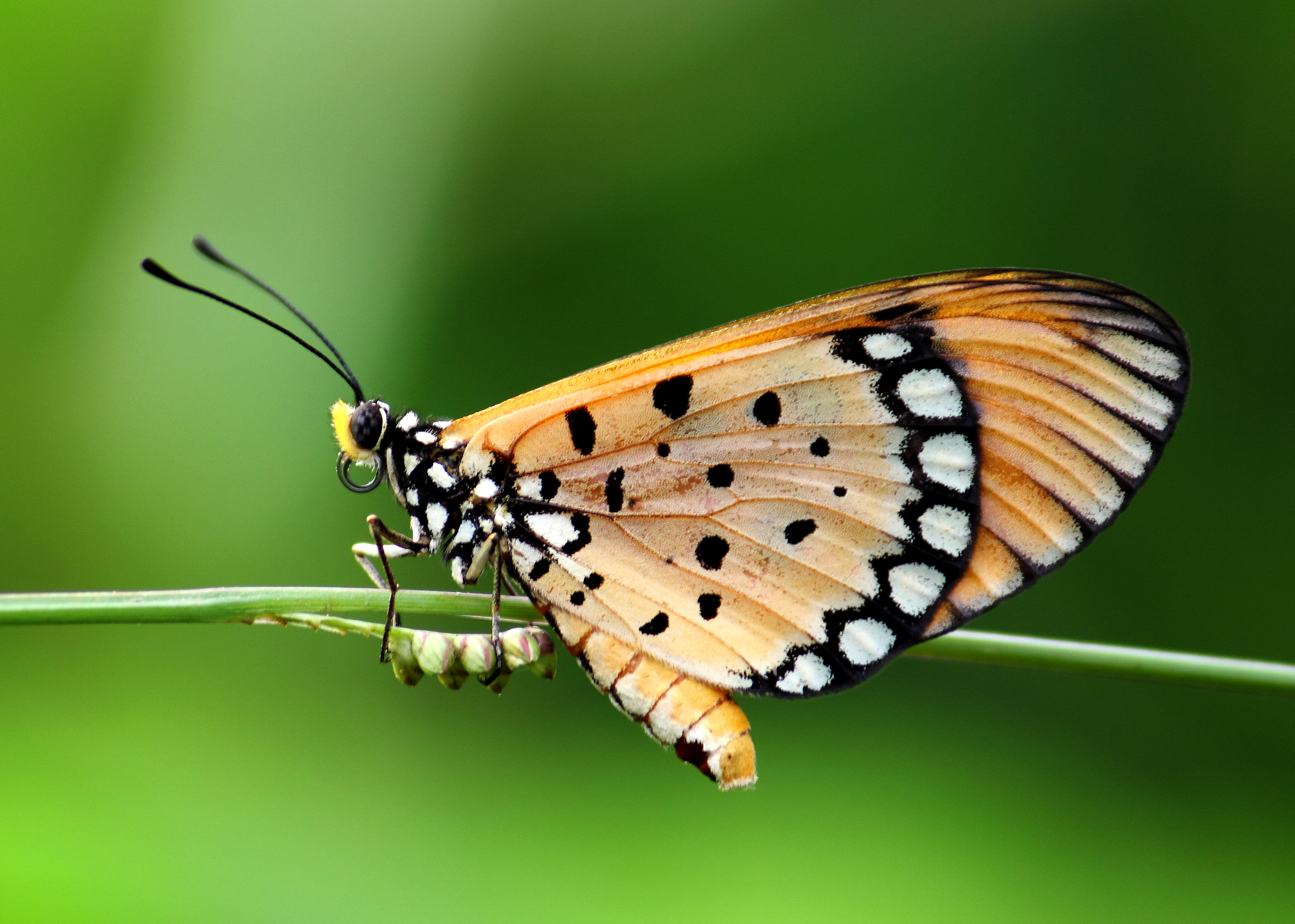
Ventral view

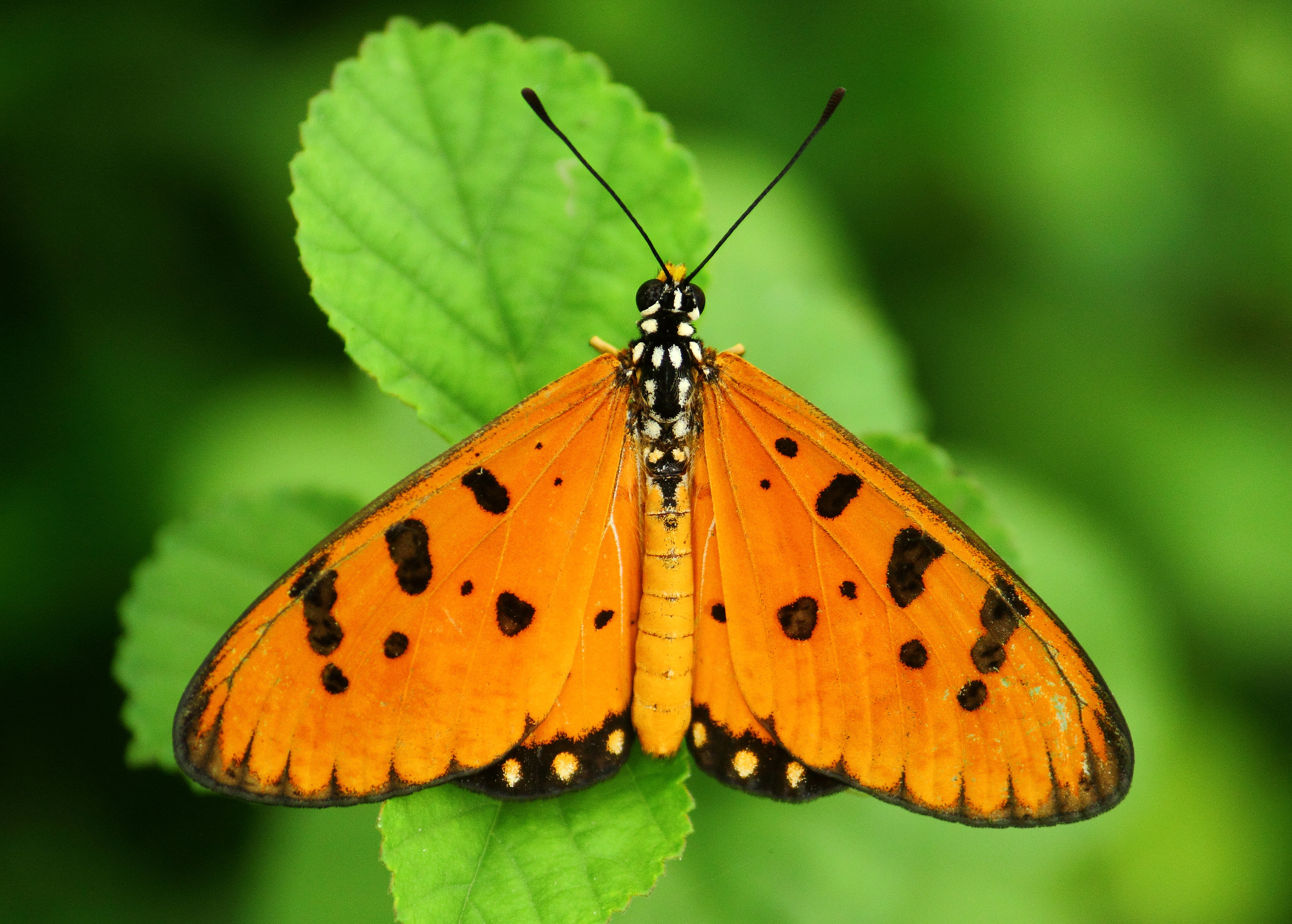
Dorsal view

==== Genus: Cethosia ====
===== Species: Cethosia biblis (red lacewing) =====
Subspecies: Cethosia biblis tisamena (Himalayan red lacewing)

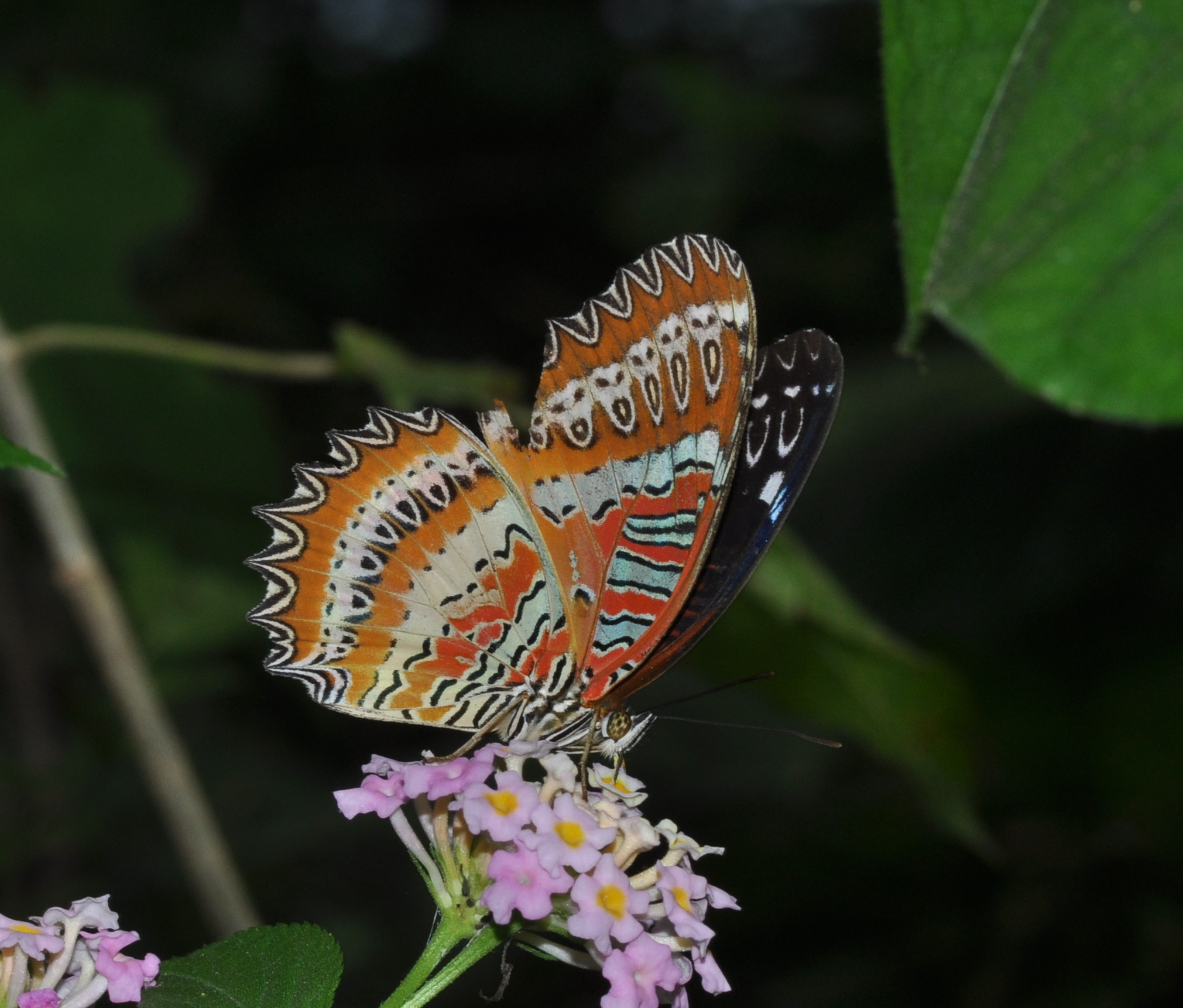
Ventral view (male)

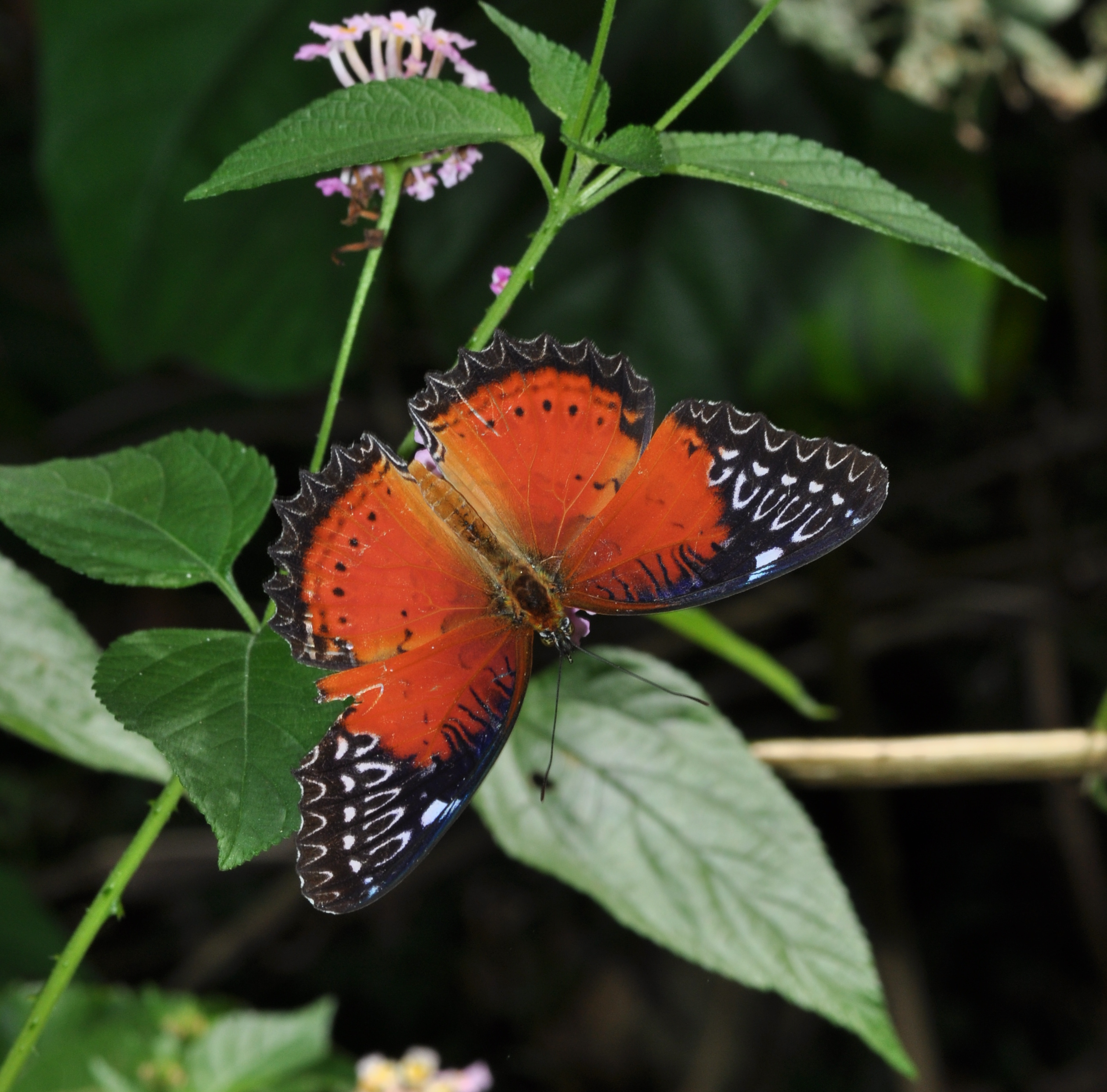
Dorsal view (male)

===== Species: Cethosia cyane (leopard lacewing) =====
Subspecies: Cethosia cyane cyane (Bengal leopard lacewing)

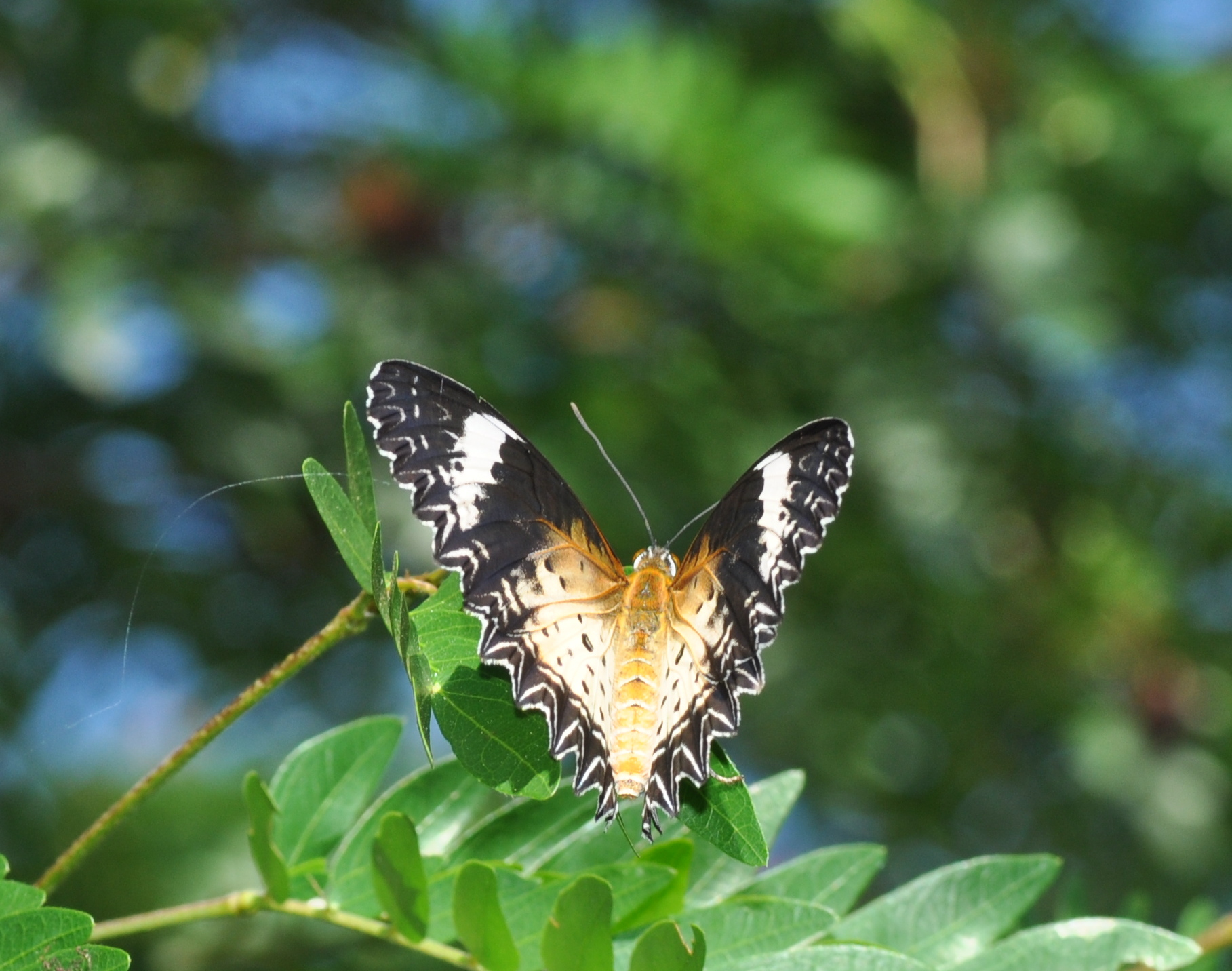
Dorsal view (female)

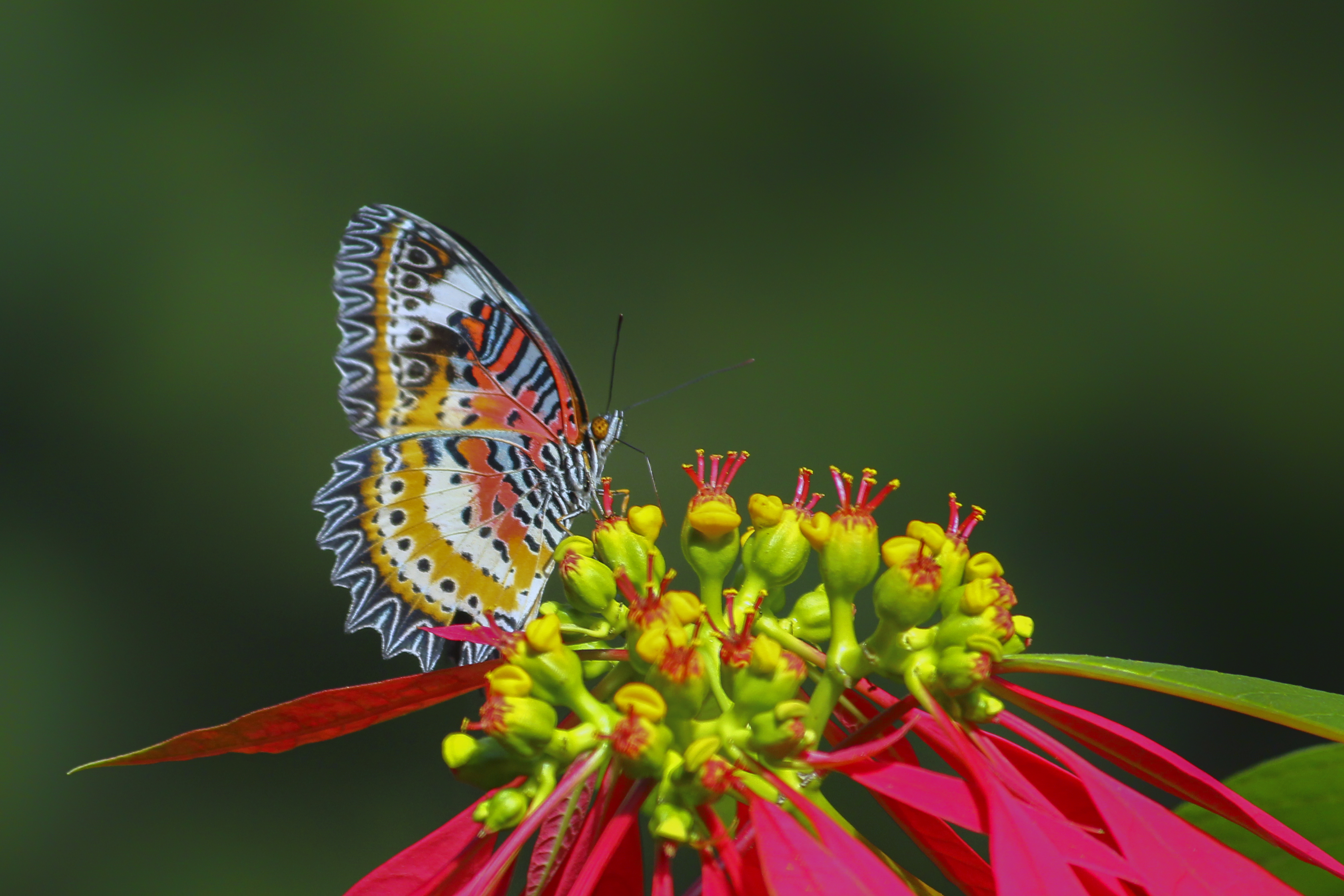
Ventral view

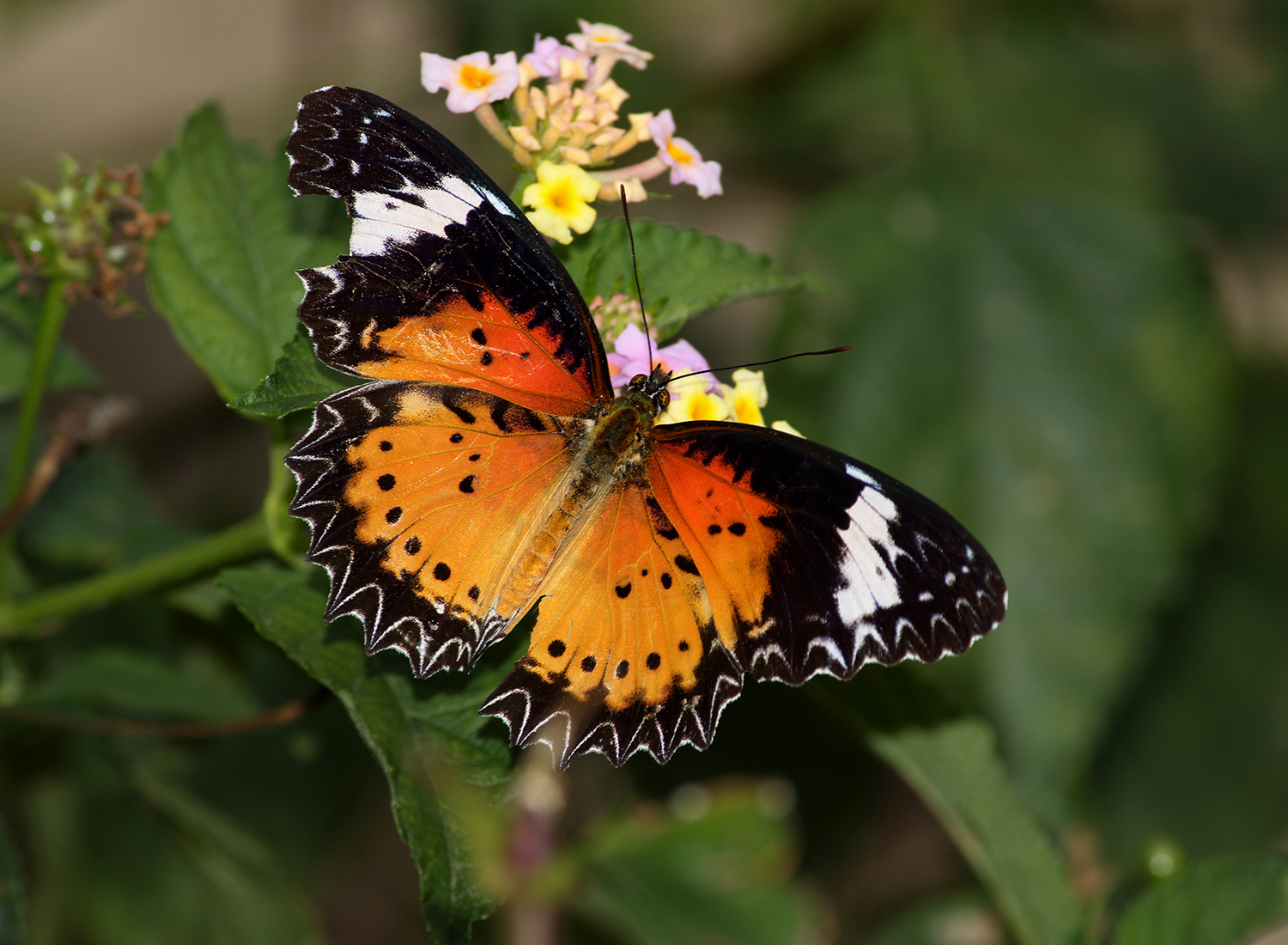
Dorsal view

Tribe: Argynnini

==== Genus: Argynnis ====
===== Species: Argynnis hyperbius (tropical fritillary) =====
Subspecies: Argynnis hyperbius hyperbius (Chinese tropical fritillary)

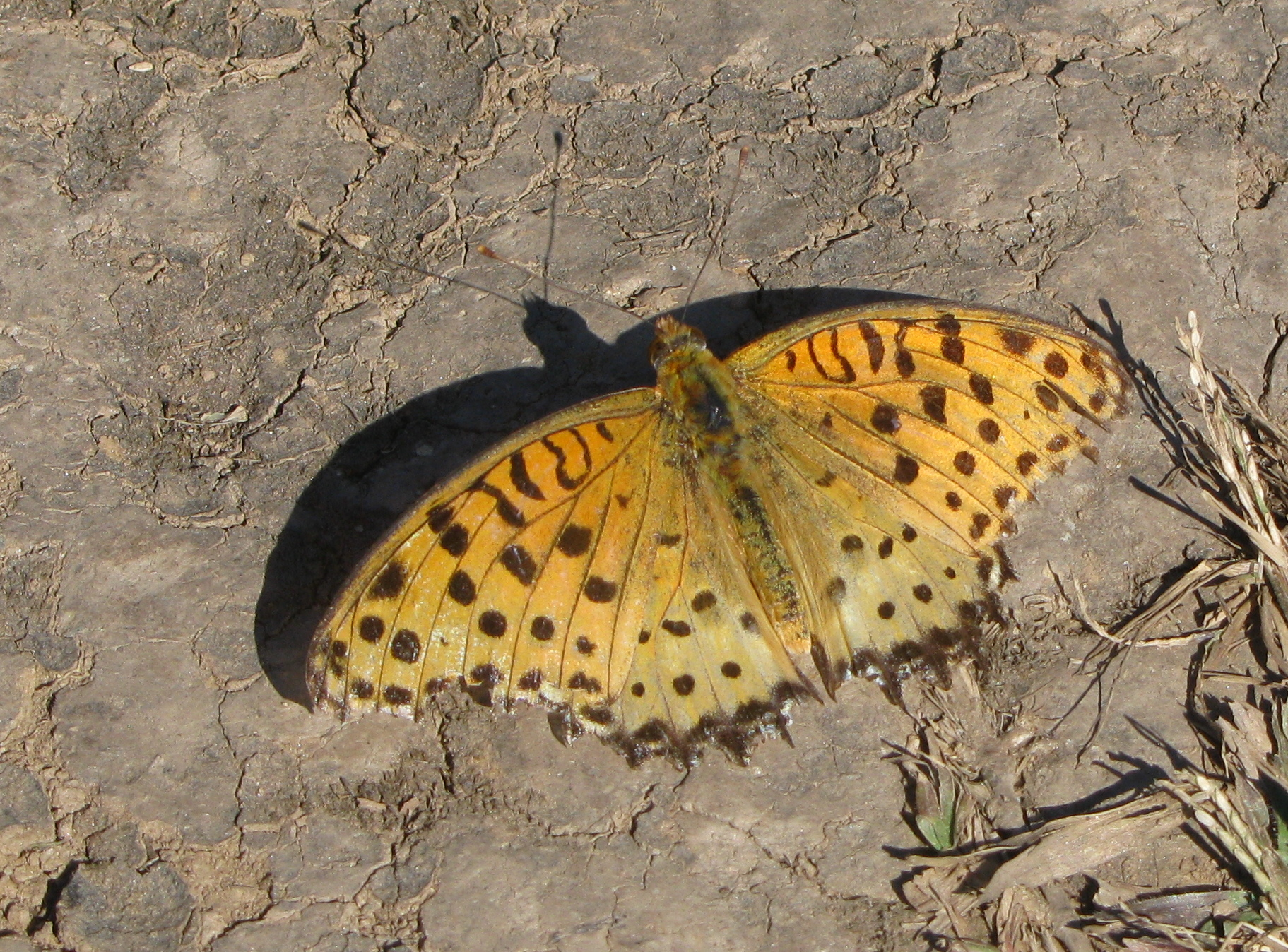
Dorsal view (male)

Tribe: Vagrantini

==== Genus: Cirrochroa ====
===== Species: Cirrochroa aoris (large yeoman) =====
Subspecies: Cirrochroa aoris aoris (Himalayan large yeoman)

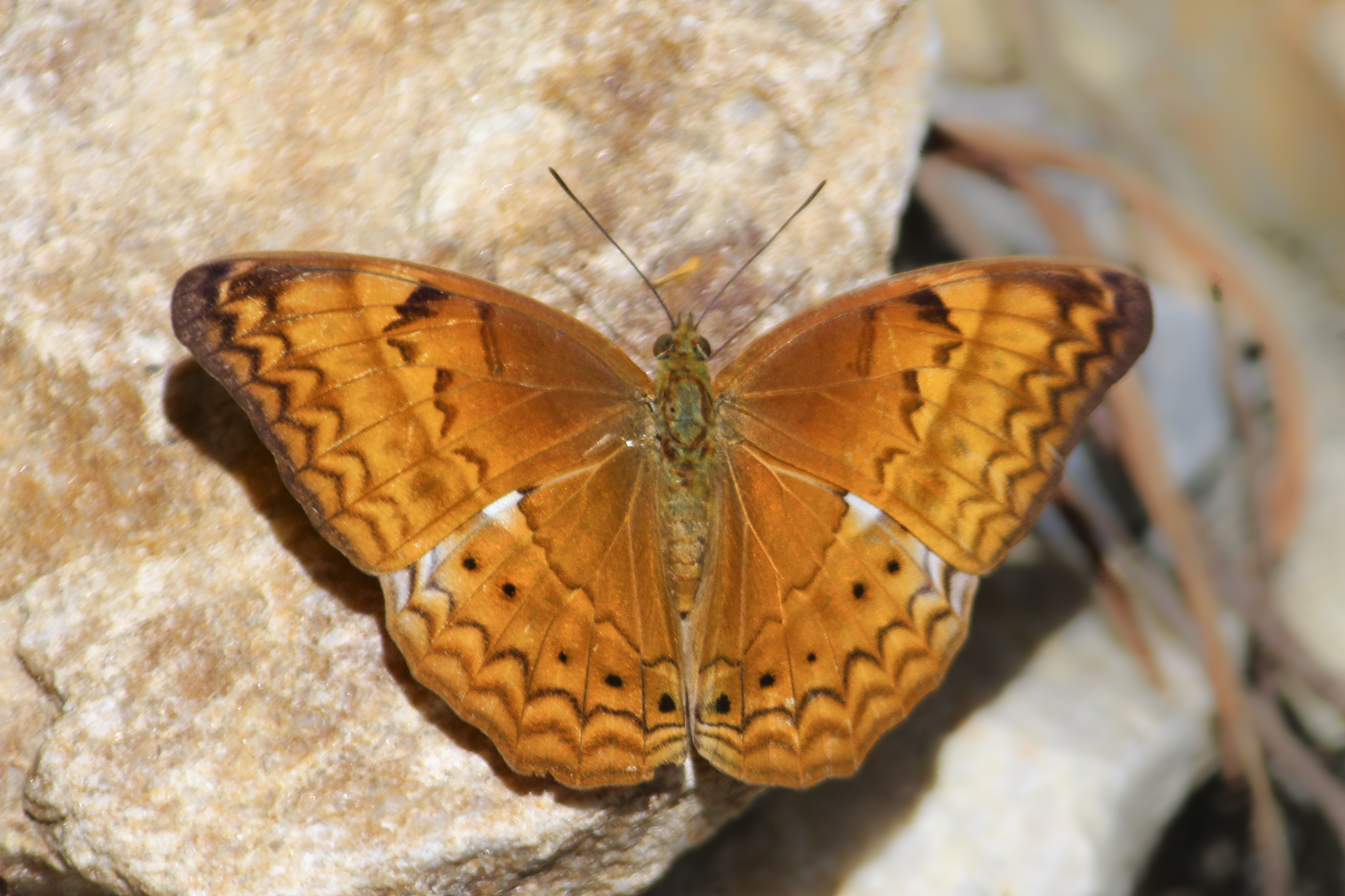
Dorsal view (female)

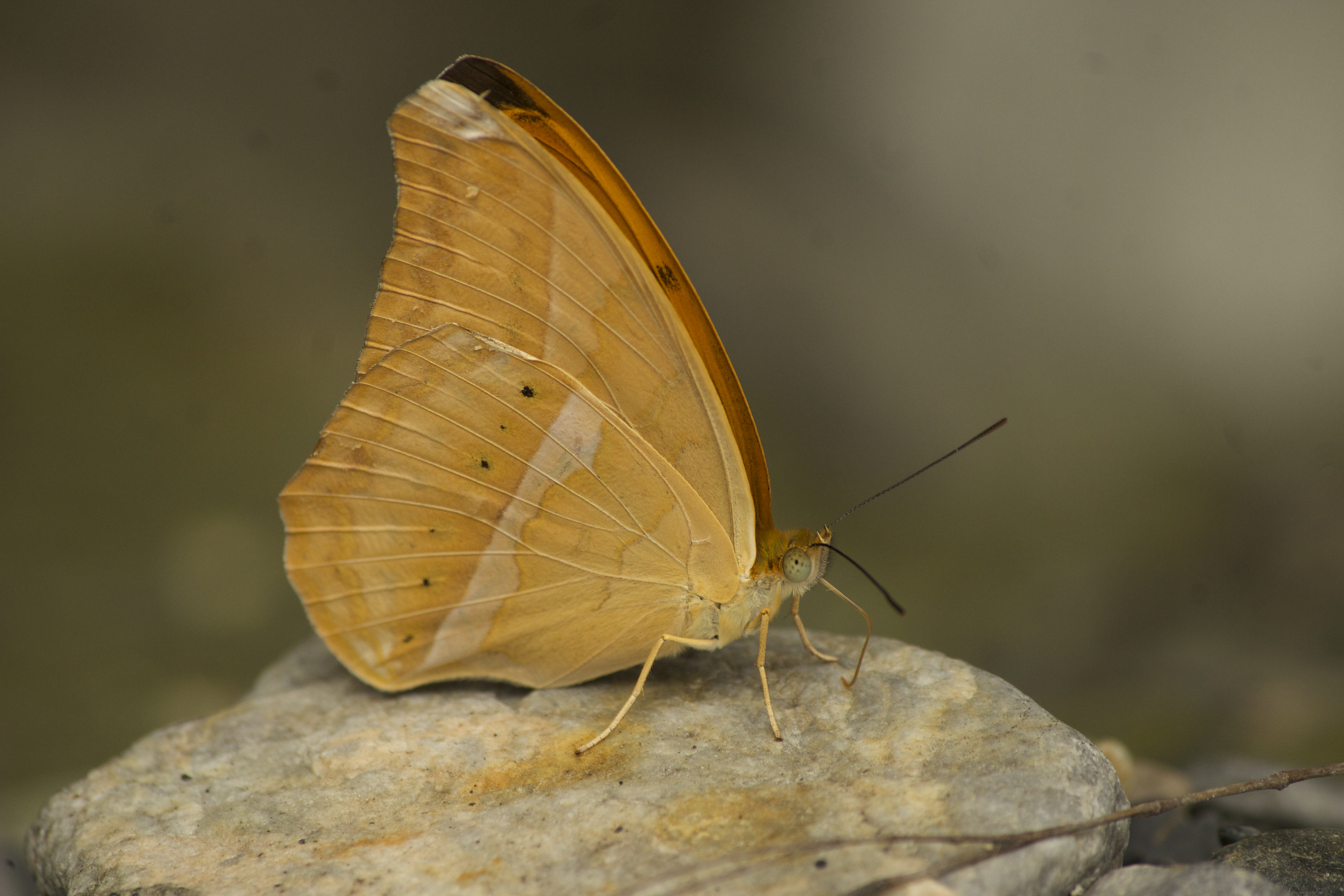
Ventral view (male)

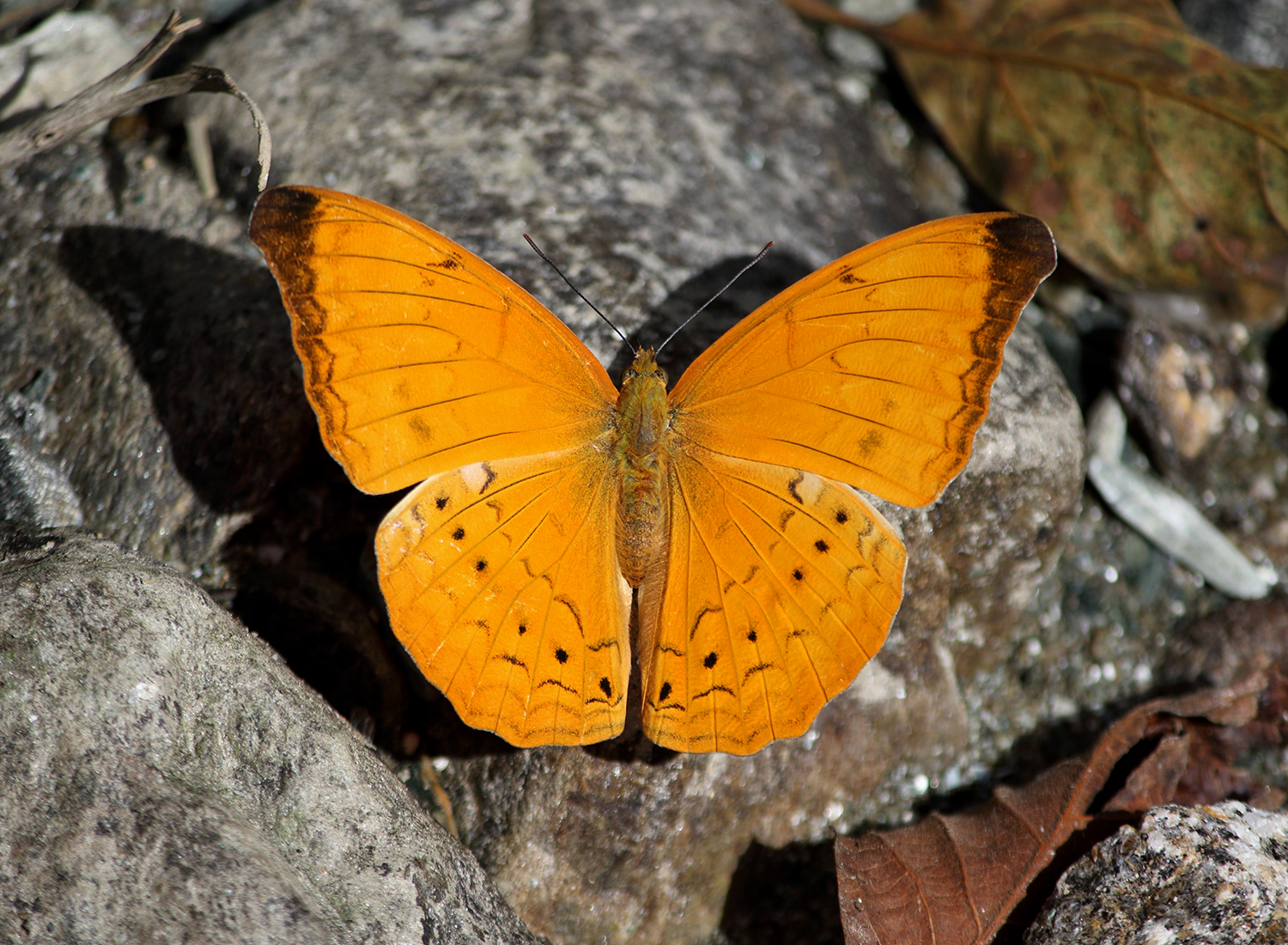
Dorsal view (male)

===== Species: Cirrochroa tyche (common yeoman) =====
Subspecies: Cirrochroa tyche mithila (Bengal common yeoman)

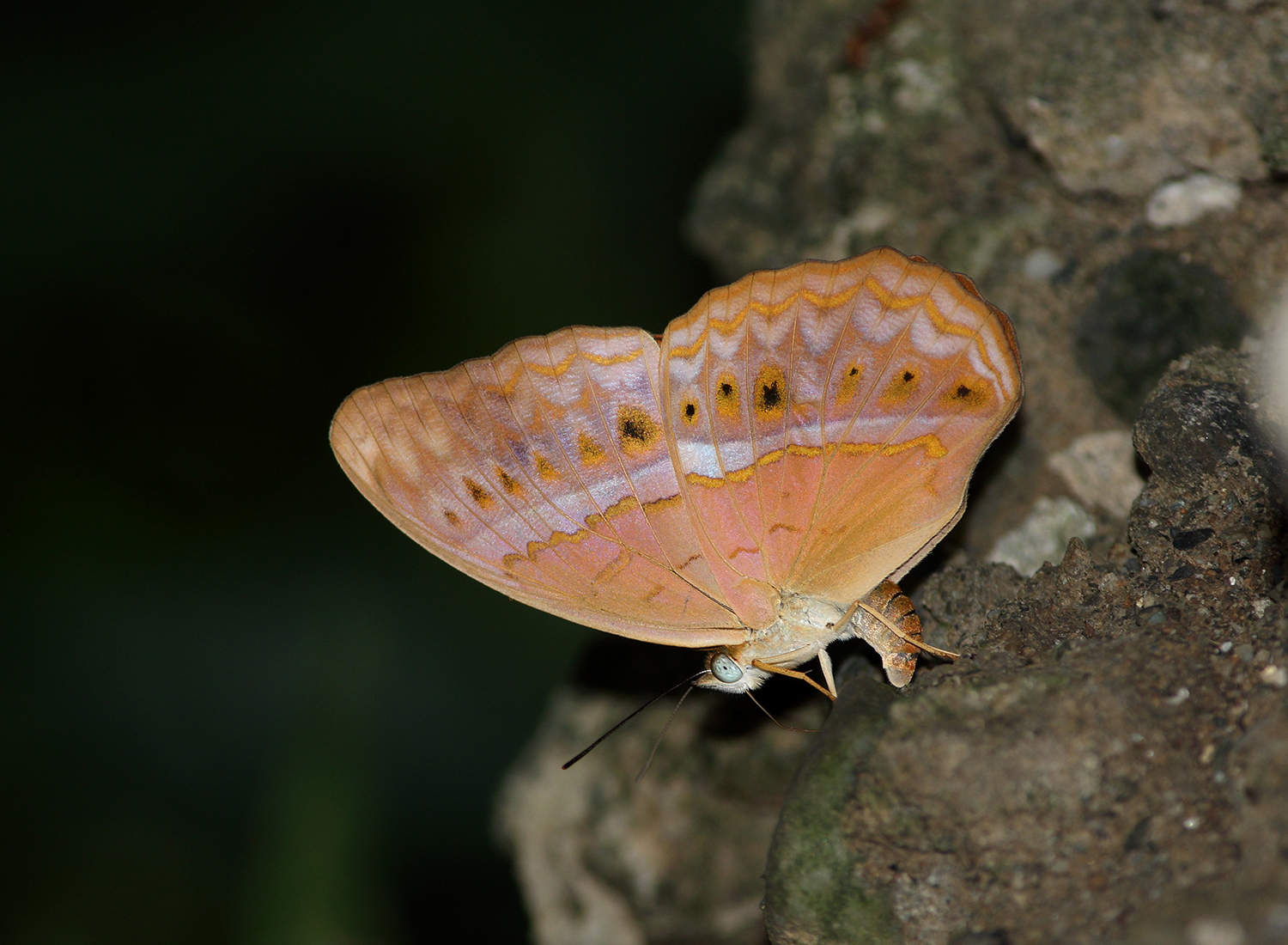
Ventral view

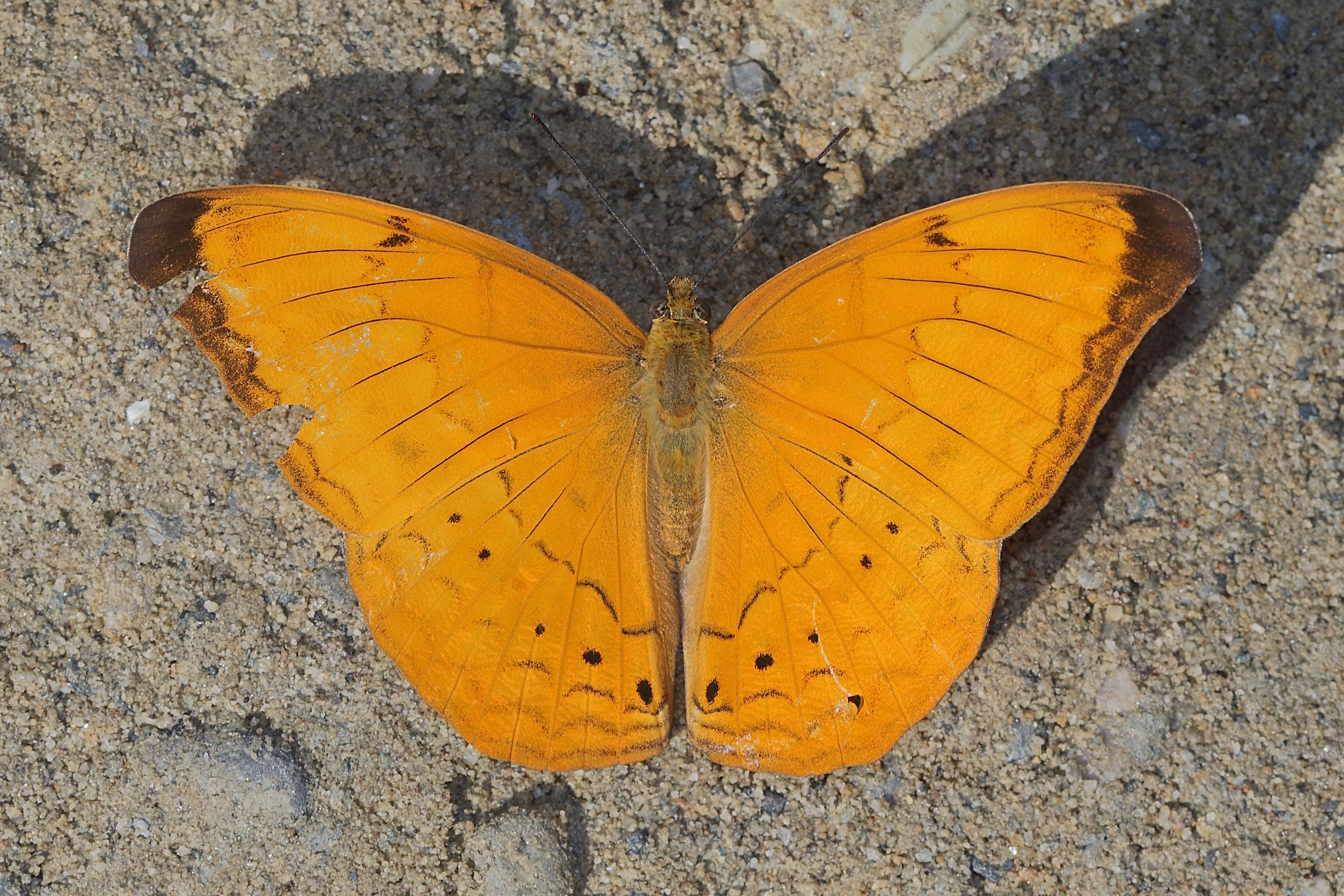
Dorsal view

==== Genus: Phalanta ====
===== Species: Phalanta phalantha (common leopard) =====
Subspecies: Phalanta phalantha phalantha (Oriental common leopard)

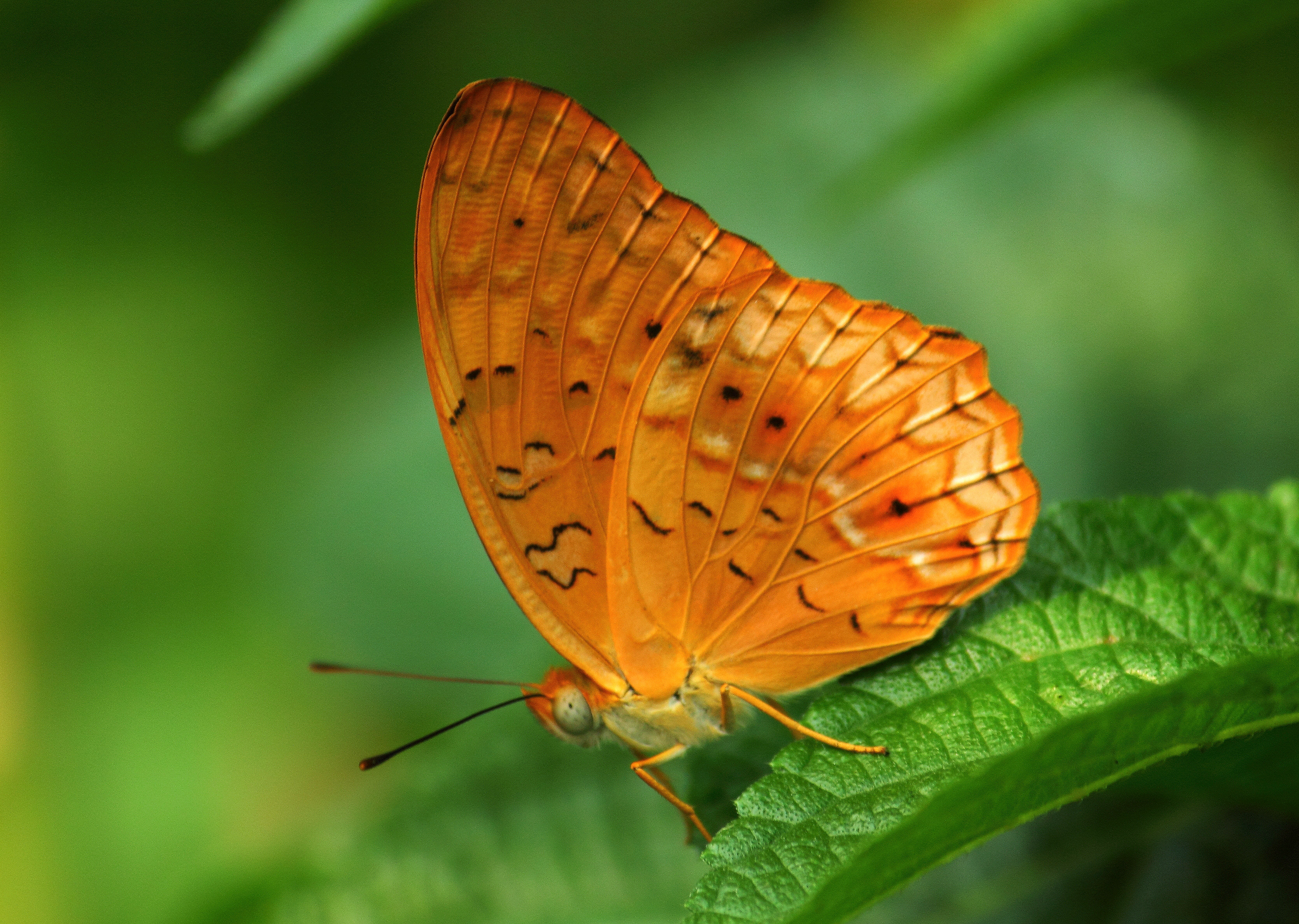
Ventral view

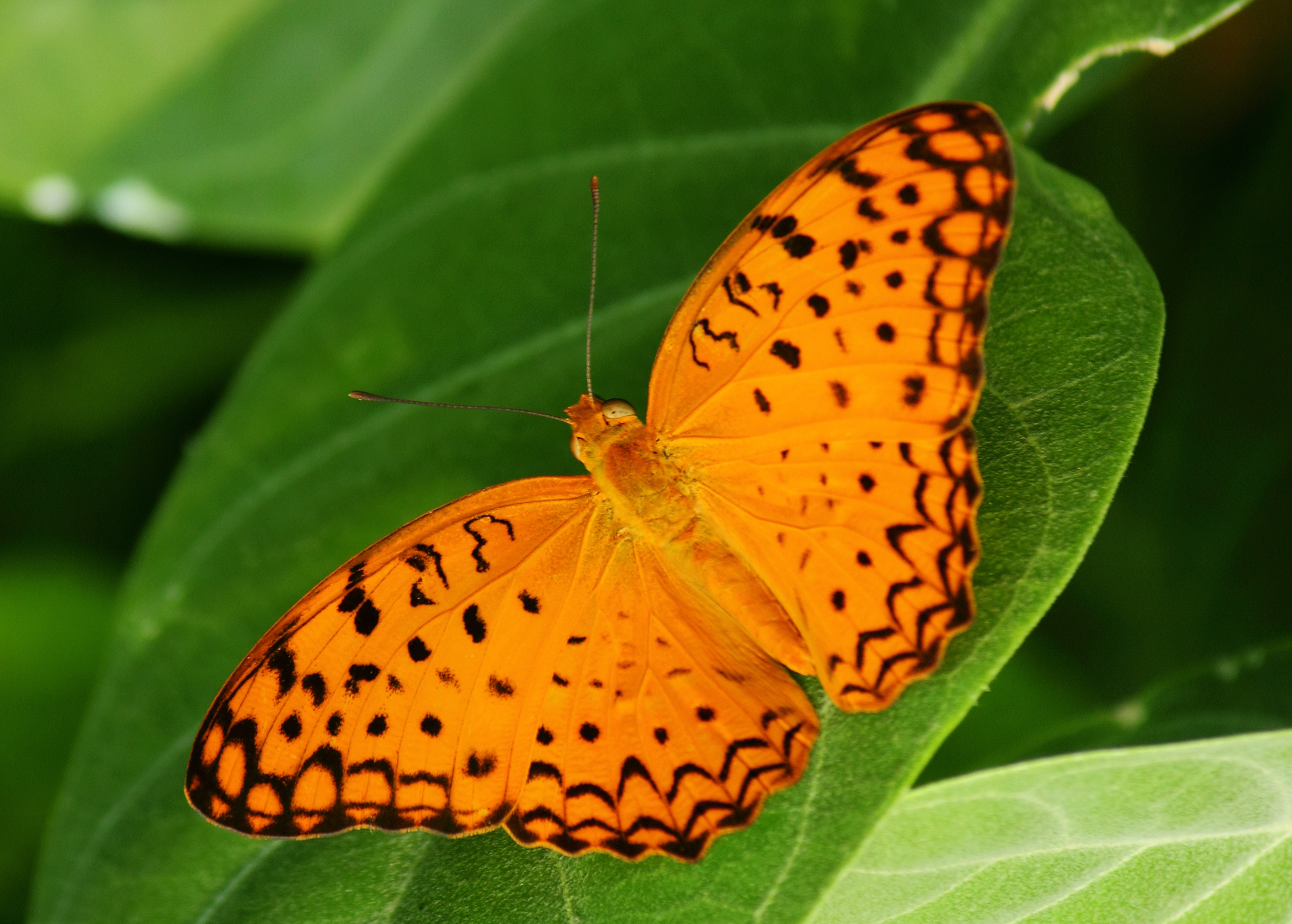
Dorsal view

==== Genus: Vagrans ====
===== Species: Vagrans egista (vagrant) =====
Subspecies: Vagrans egista sinha (Himalayan vagrant)

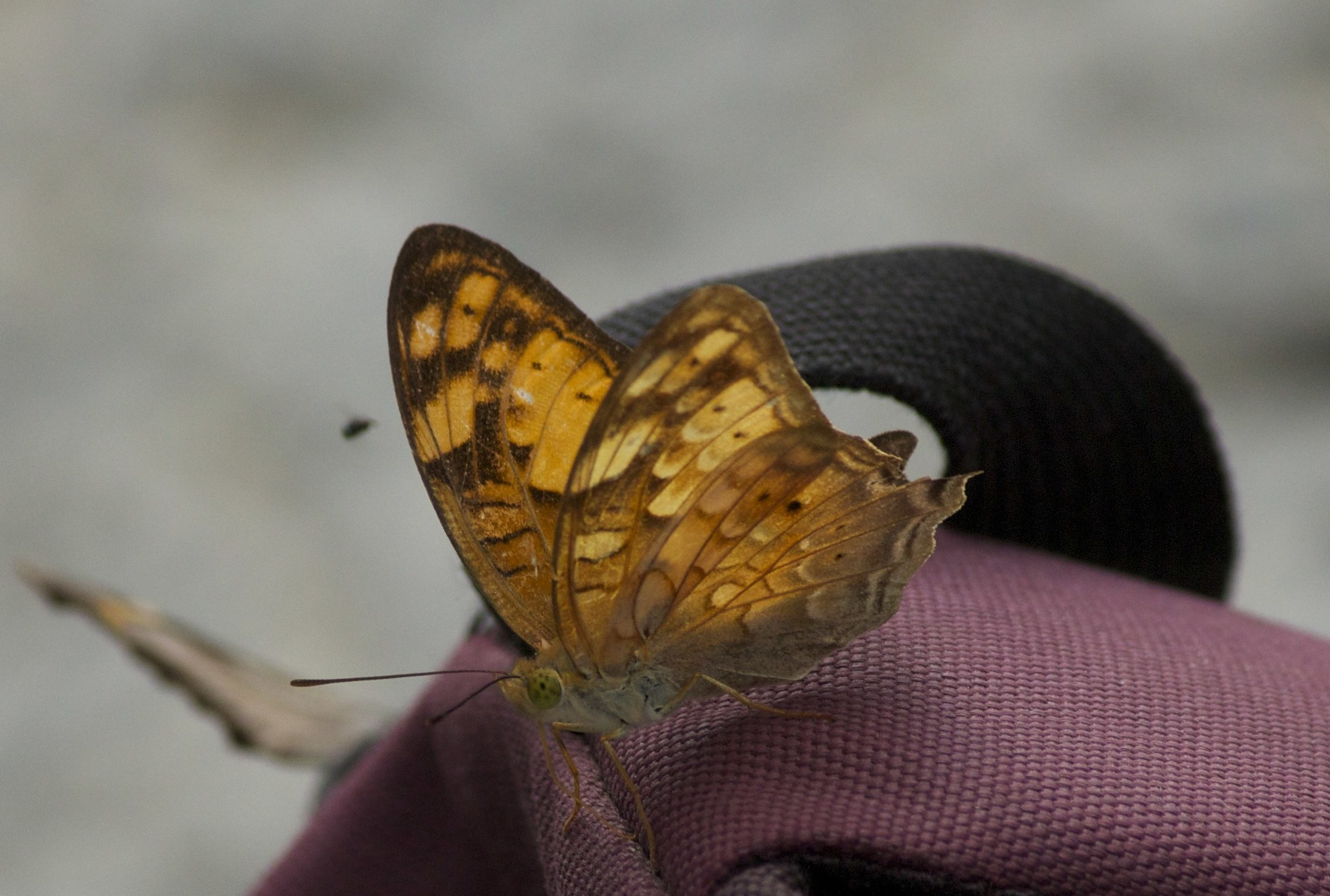
Ventral view

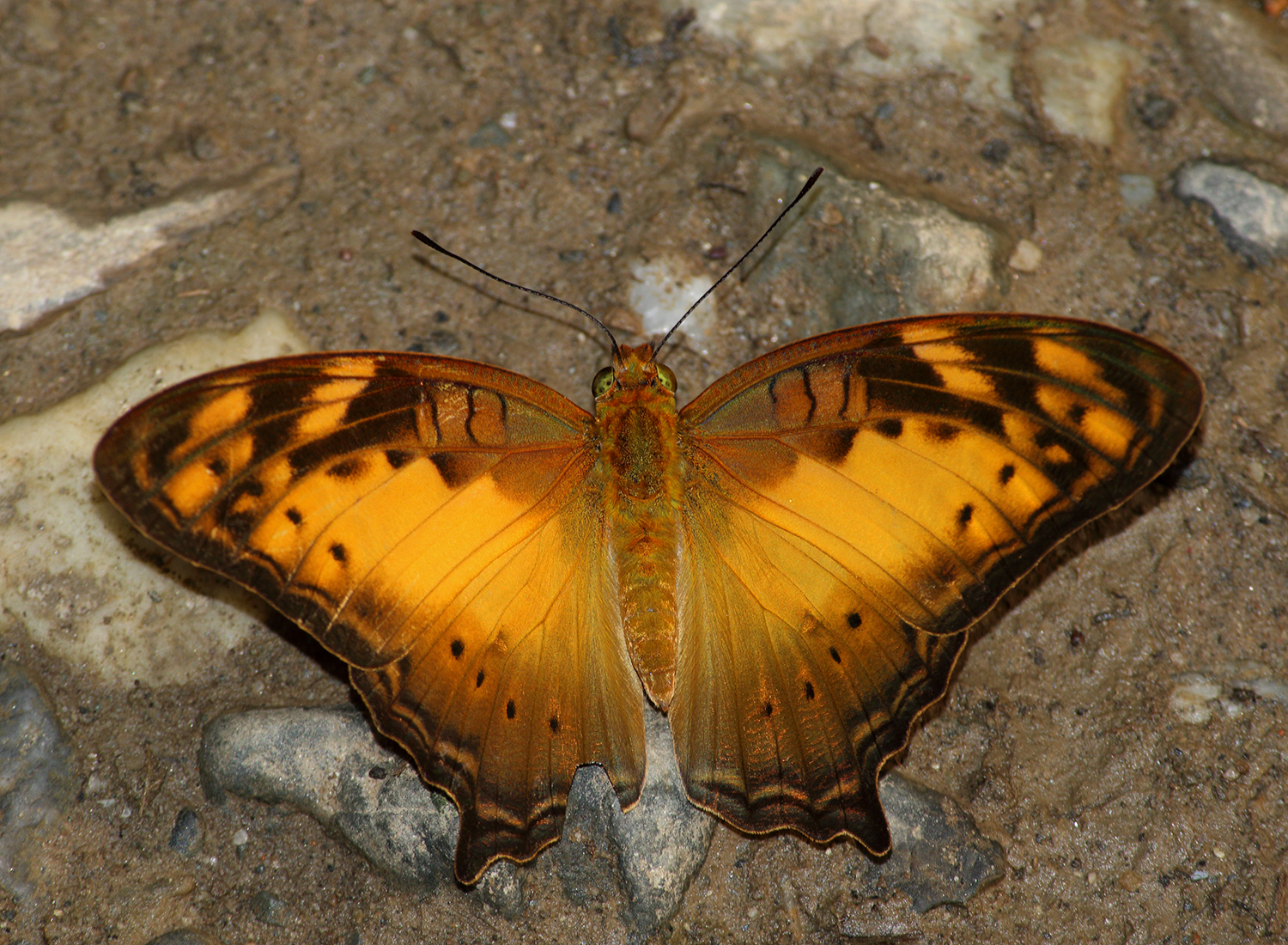
Dorsal view

==== Genus: Vindula ====
===== Species: Vindula erota (cruiser) =====
Subspecies: Vindula erota erota (Thai cruiser)

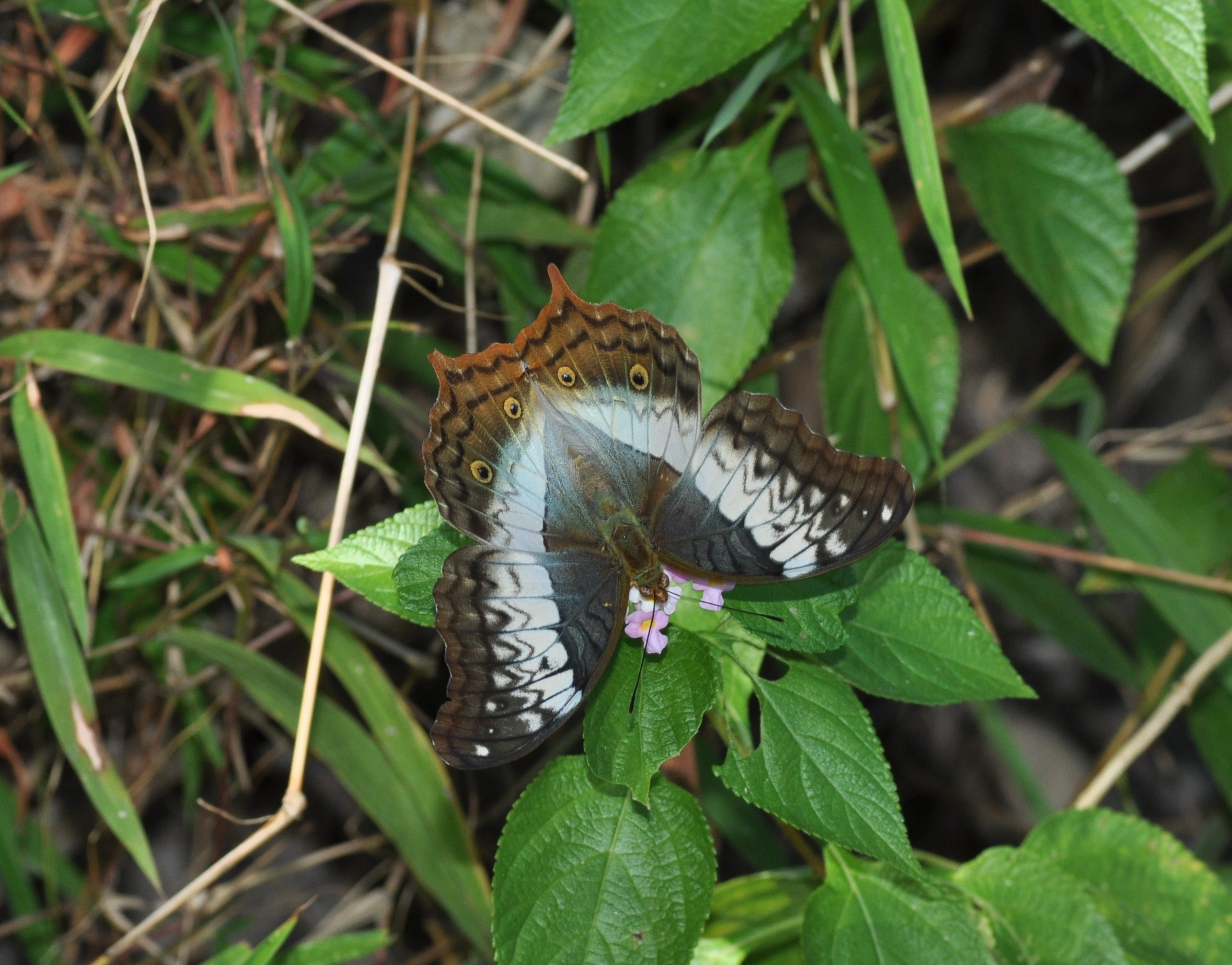
Dorsal view (female)

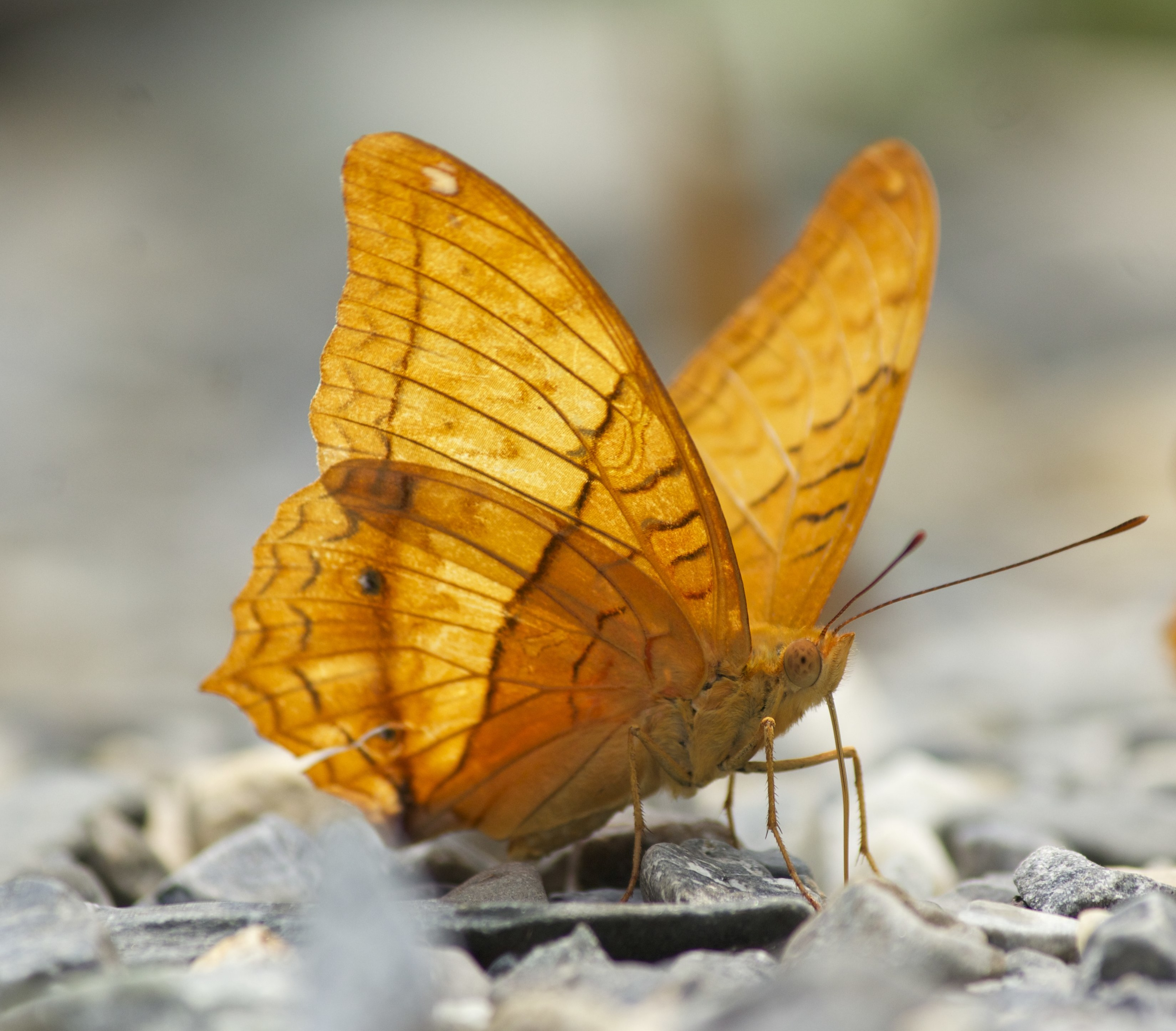
Ventral view (male)

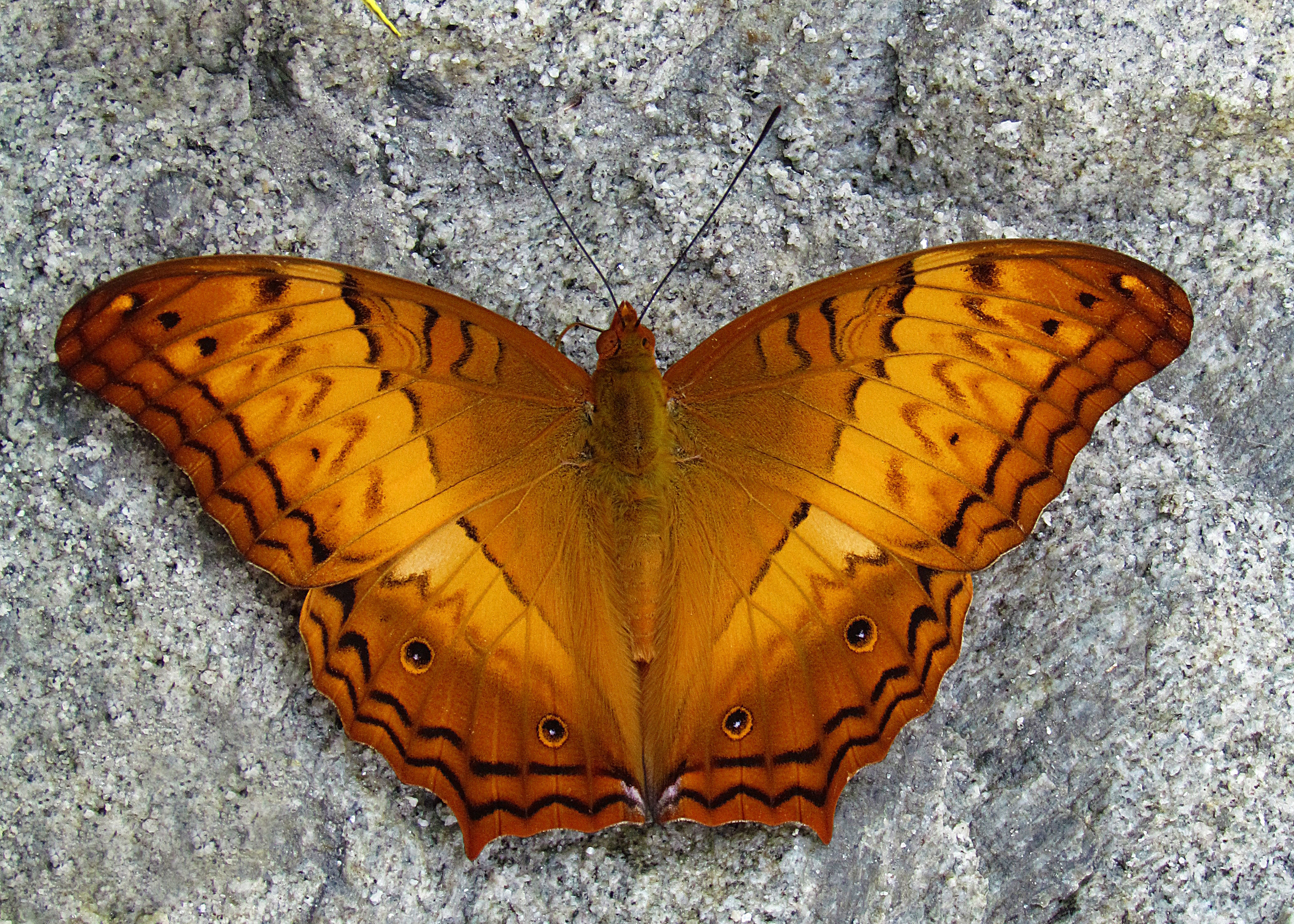
Dorsal view (male)

=== Subfamily: Limenitidinae ===
Tribe: Adoliadini

==== Genus: Euthalia ====
===== Species: Euthalia lubentina (gaudy baron) =====
Subspecies: Euthalia lubentina lubentina (Chinese gaudy baron)

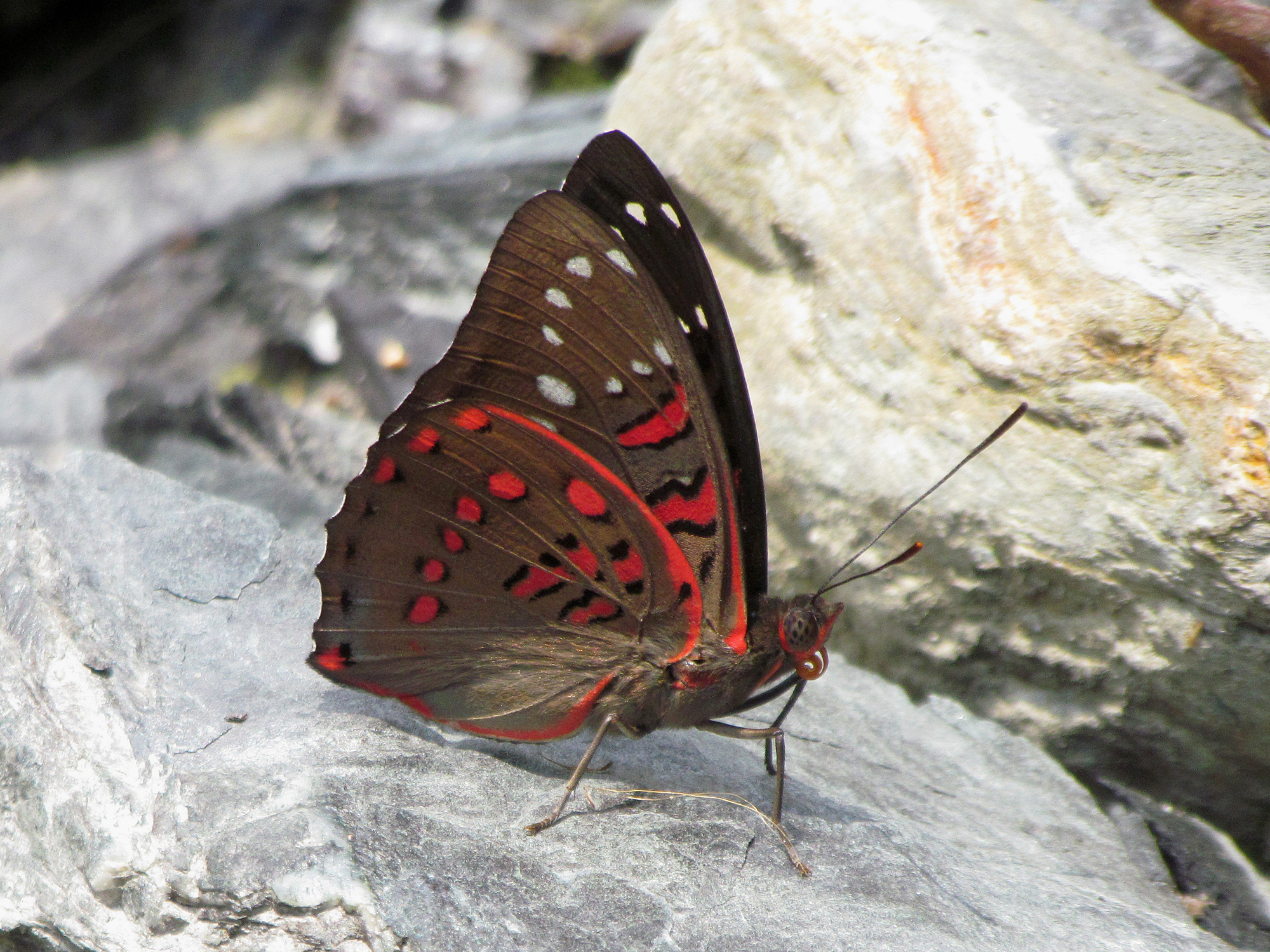
Ventral view

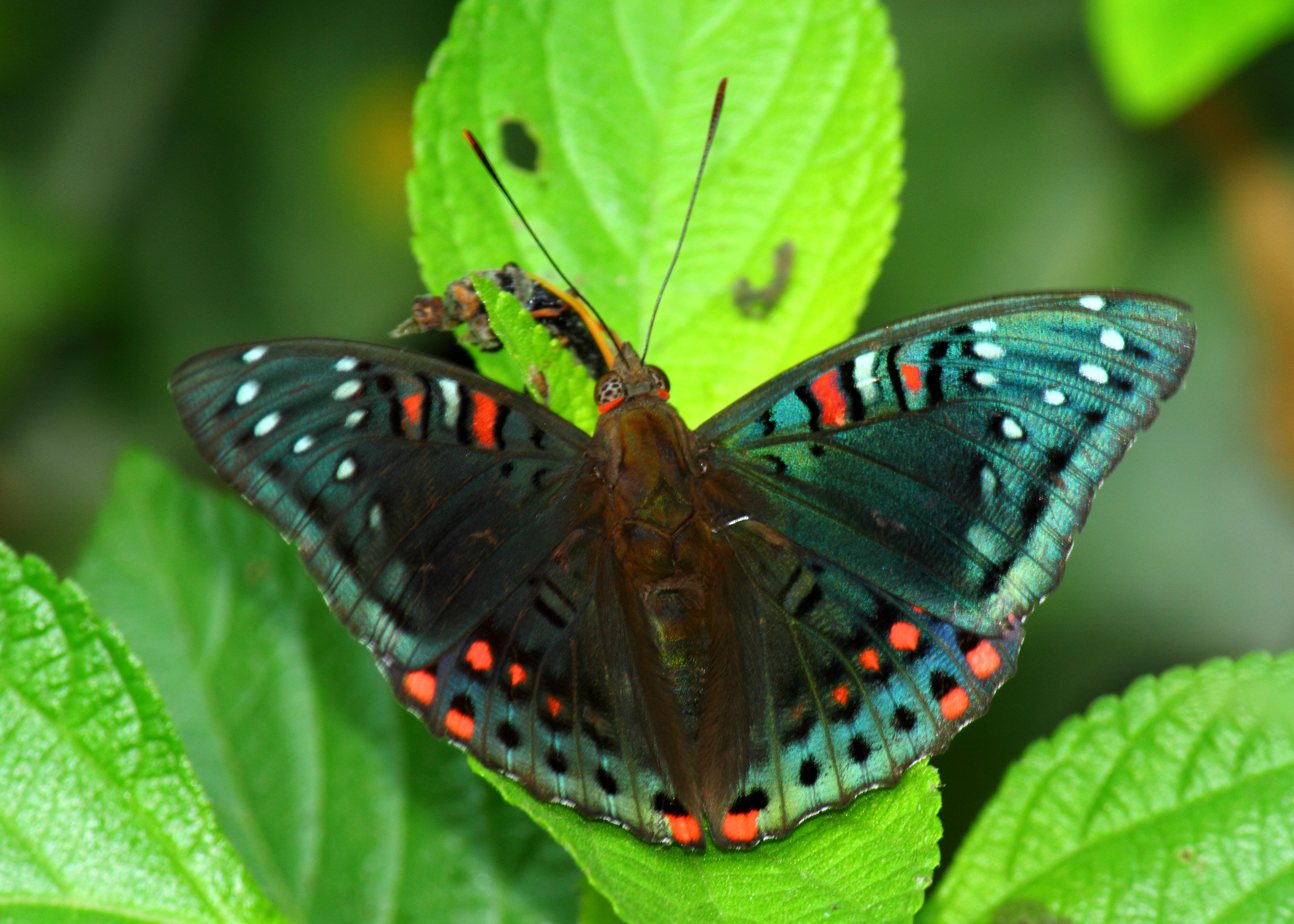
Dorsal view

===== Species: Euthalia monina (powdered baron) =====
Subspecies: Euthalia monina kesava (Assam powdered baron)

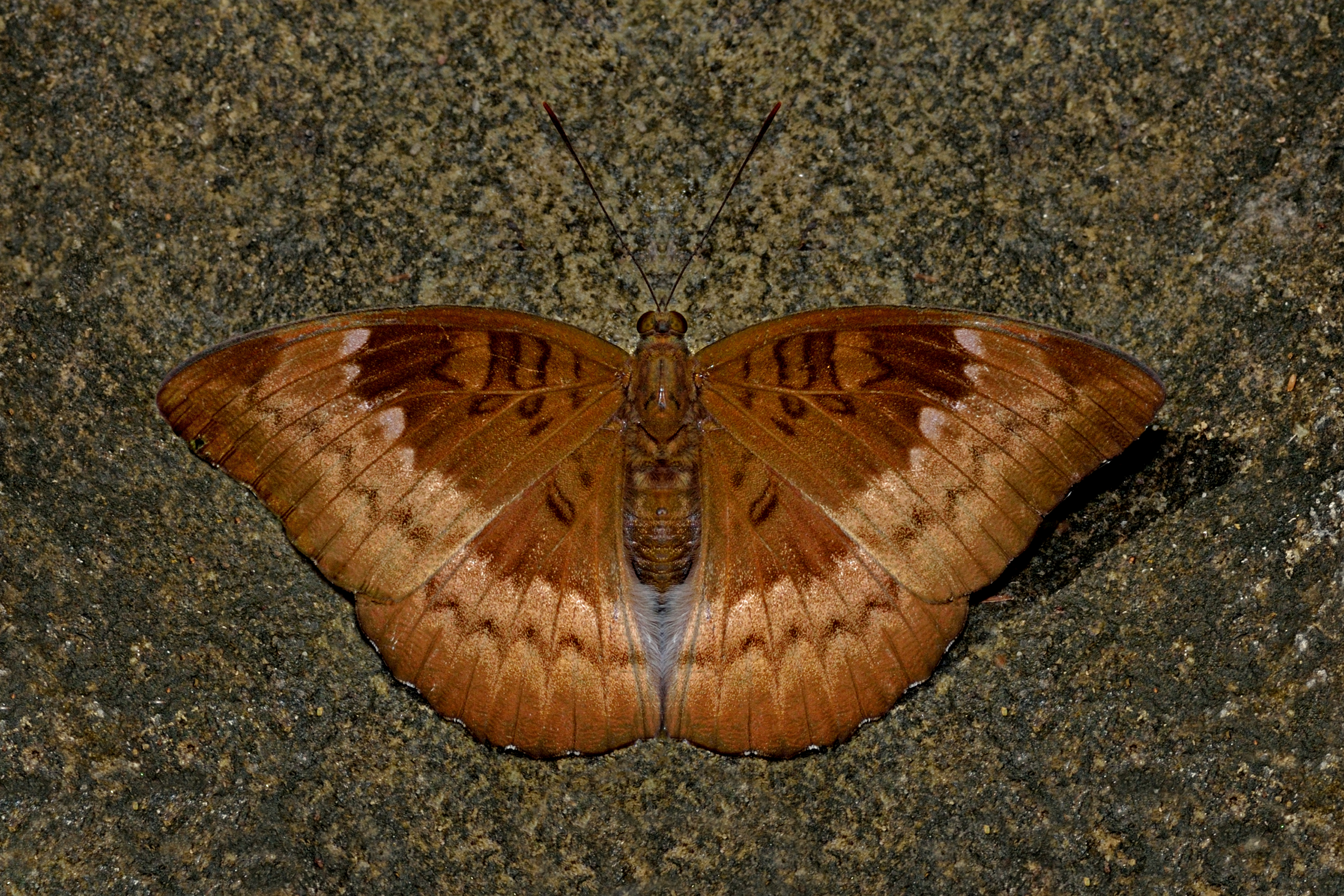
Dorsal view (female)

===== Species: Euthalia phemius (white-edged blue baron) =====
Subspecies: Euthalia phemius phemius (Sylhet white-edged blue baron)

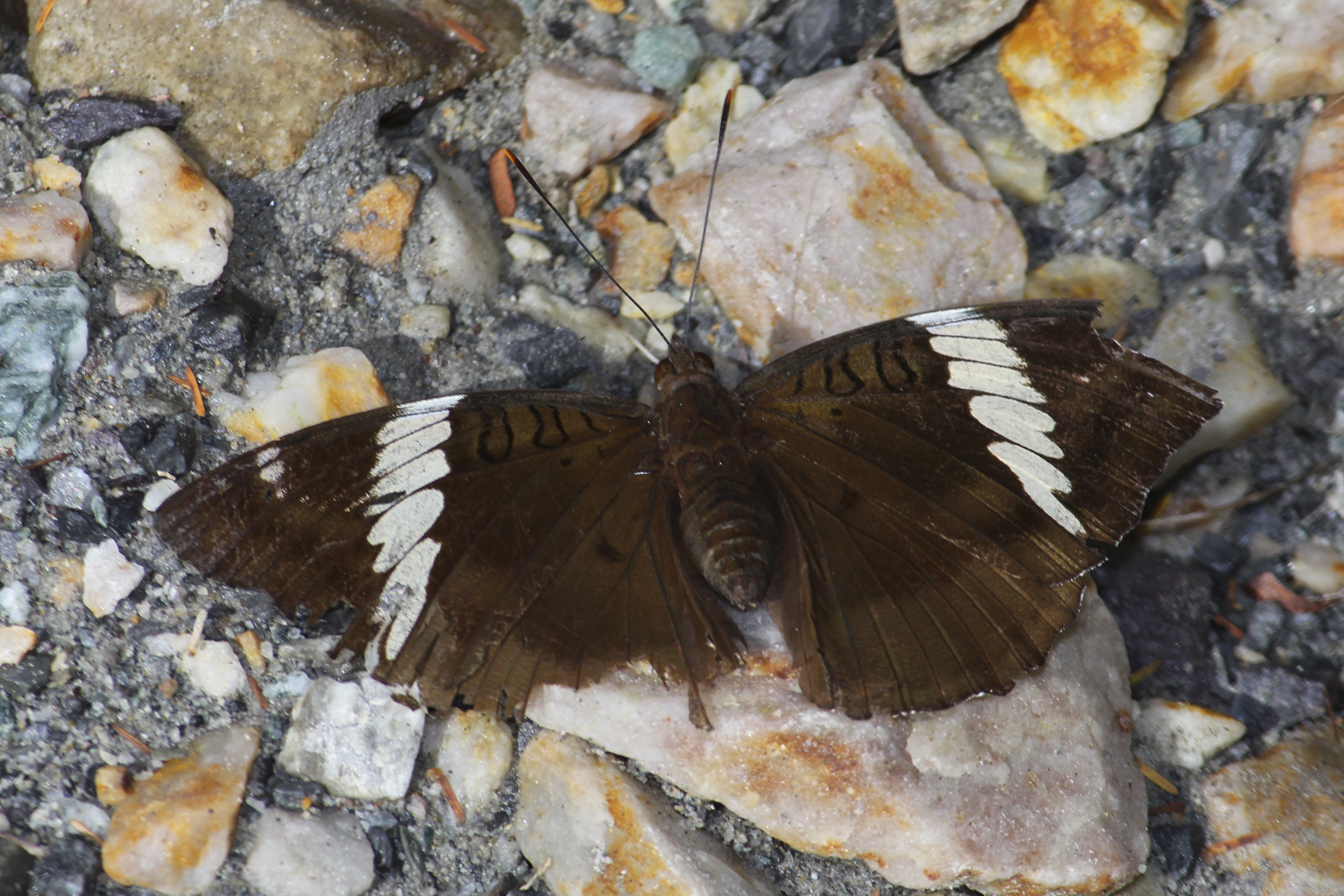
Dorsal view (female)

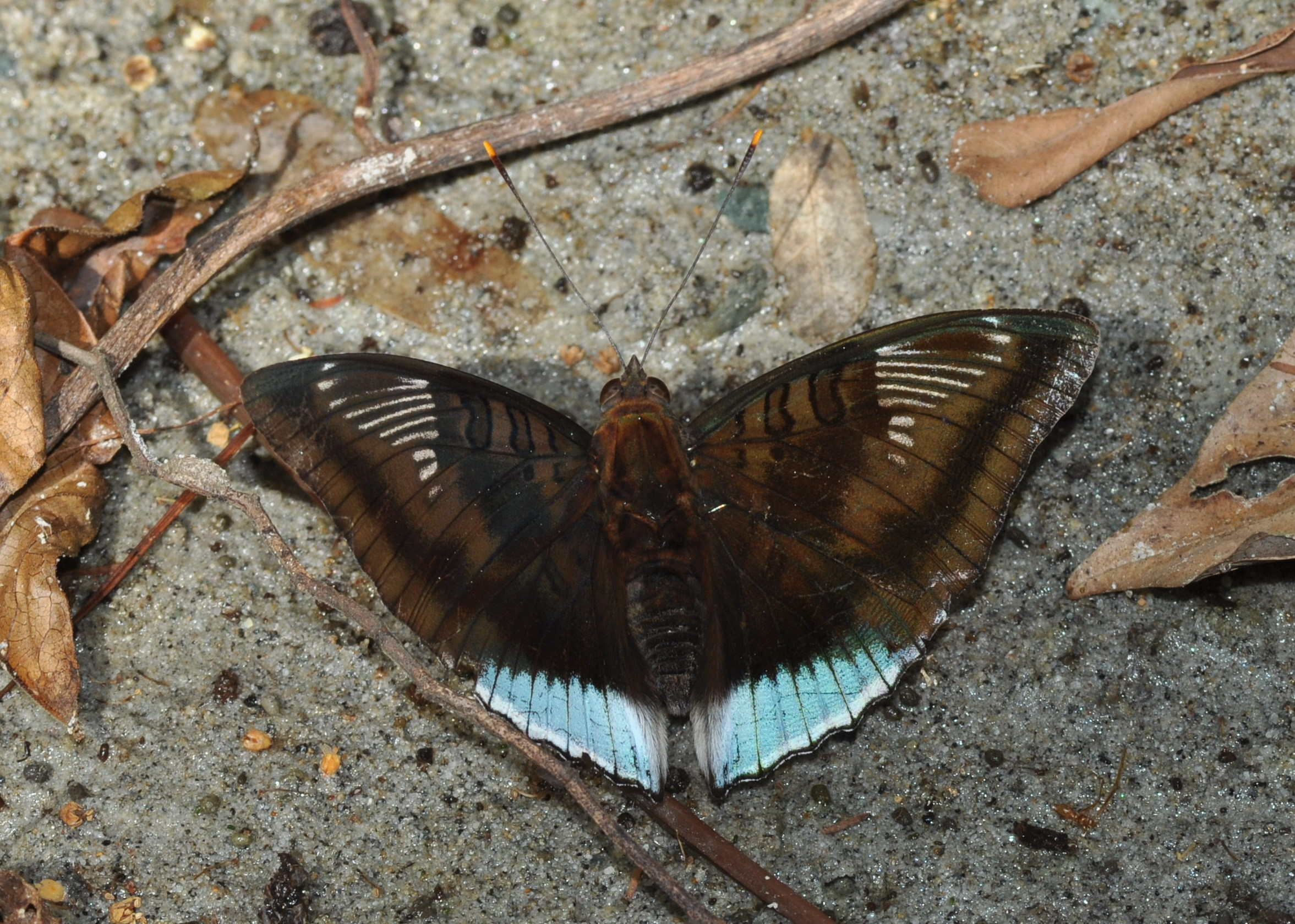
Dorsal view (male)

==== Genus: Symphaedra ====
===== Species: Symphaedra nais (baronet) =====
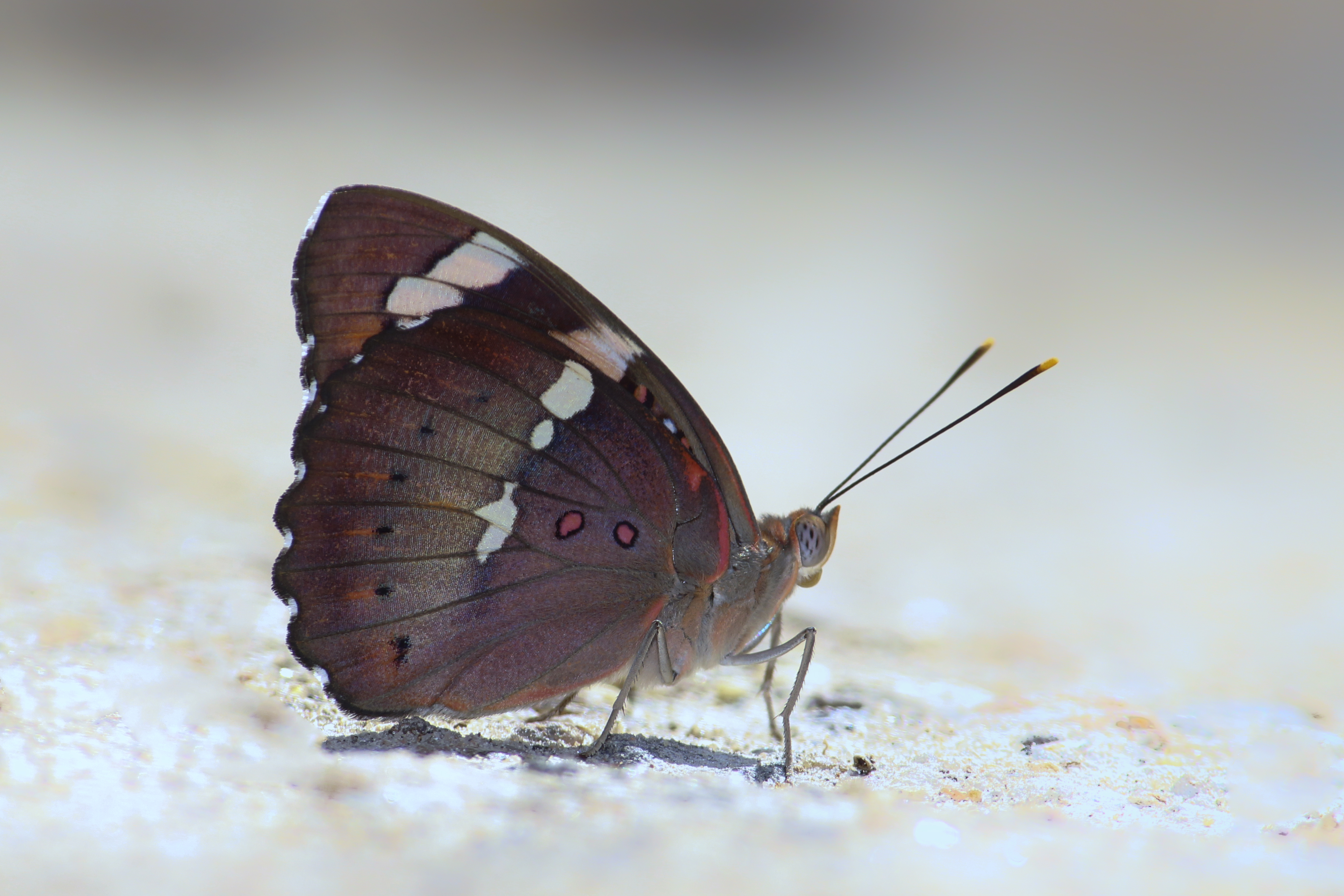
Ventral view

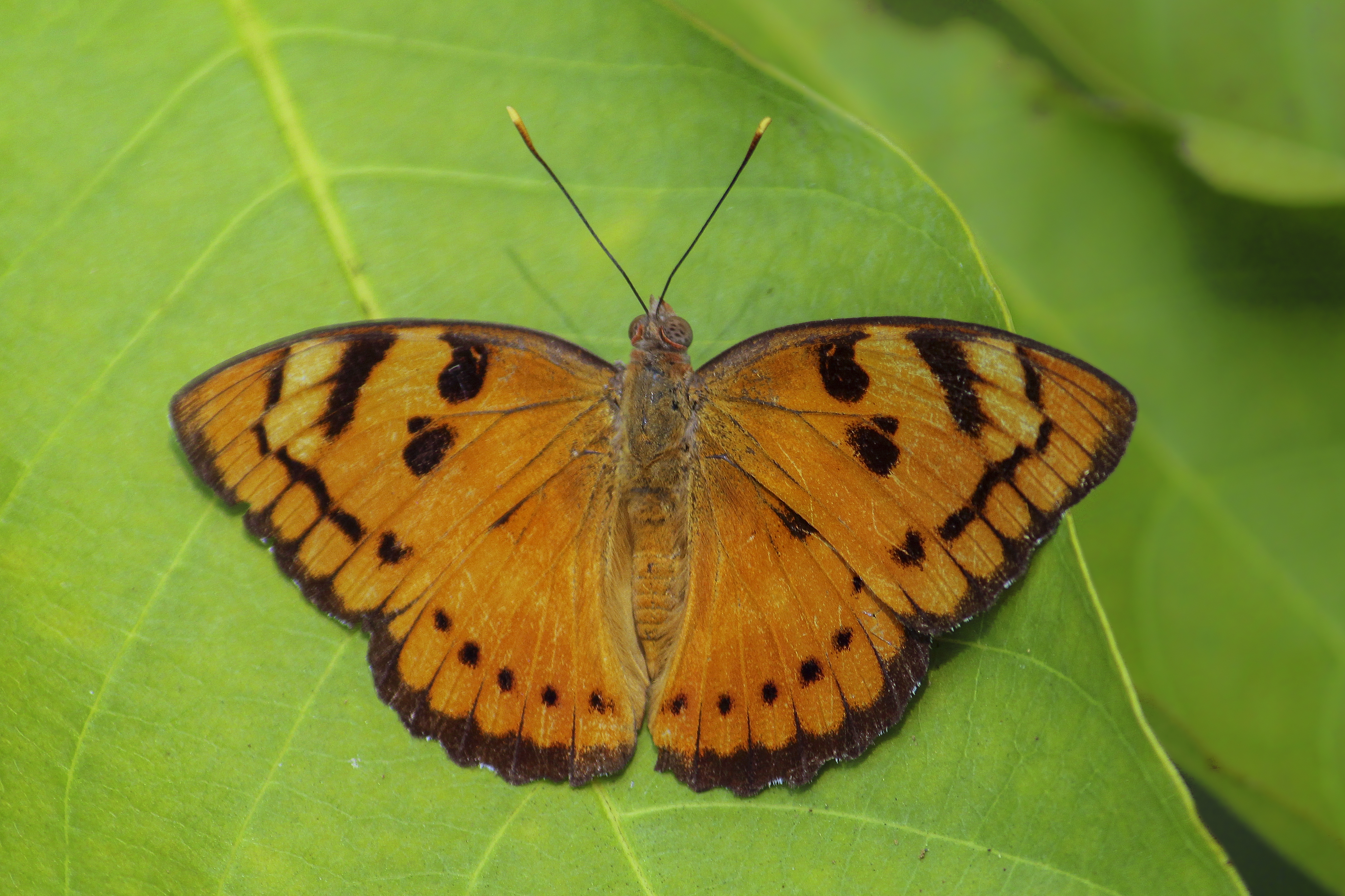
Dorsal view

==== Genus: Tanaecia ====
===== Species: Tanaecia jahnu (plain earl) =====
Subspecies: Tanaecia jahnu jahnu (Darjeeling plain earl)

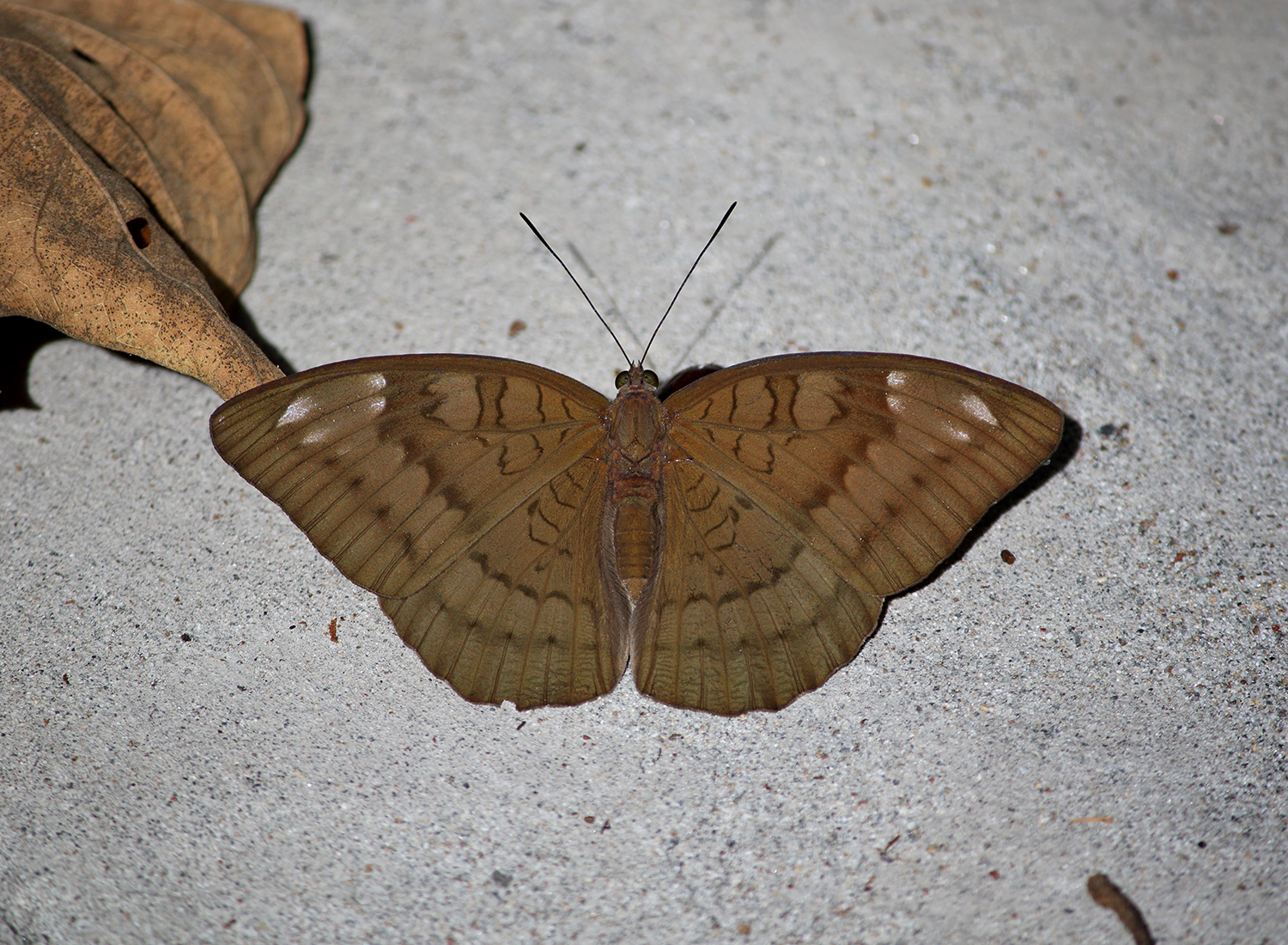
Dorsal view (female)

===== Species: Tanaecia julii (common earl) =====
Subspecies: Tanaecia julii appiades (changeable common earl)

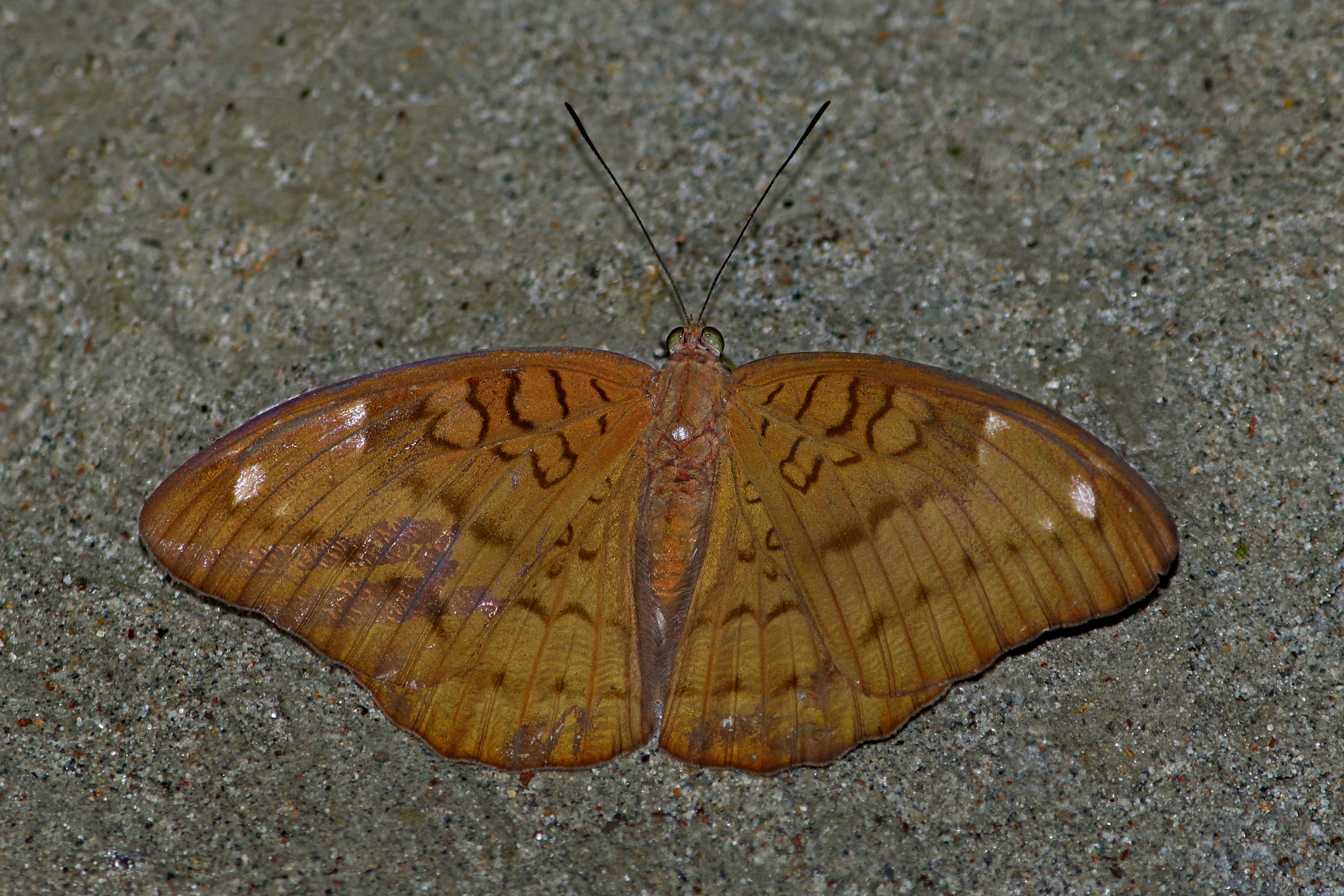
Dorsal view (female)

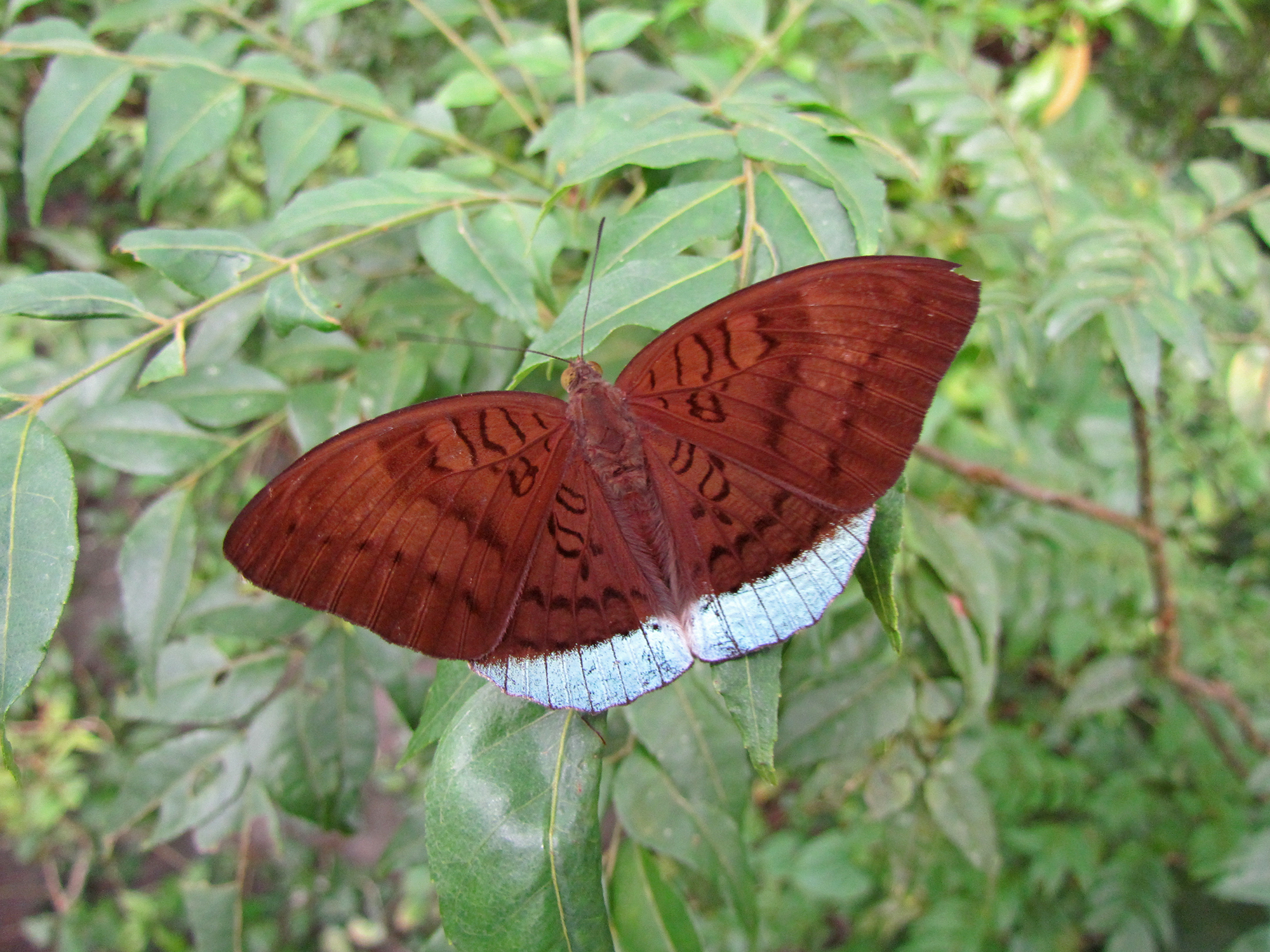
Dorsal view (male)

===== Species: Tanaecia lepidea (grey count) =====
Subspecies: Tanaecia lepidea lepidea (Himalayan grey count)

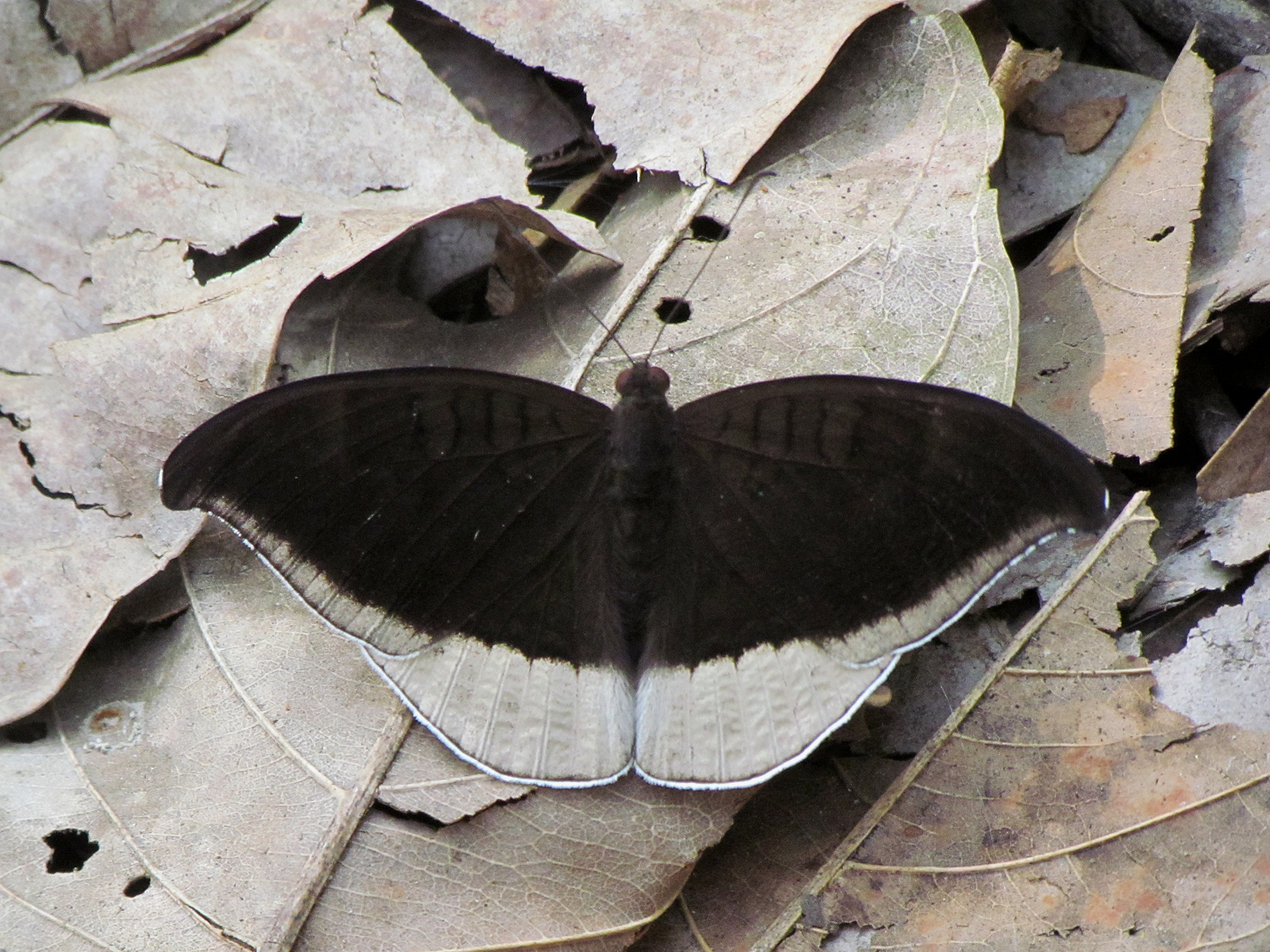
Dorsal view

Tribe: Limenitidini

==== Genus: Athyma ====
===== Species: Athyma cama (orange staff sergeant) =====
Subspecies: Athyma cama cama (Himalayan orange staff sergeant)

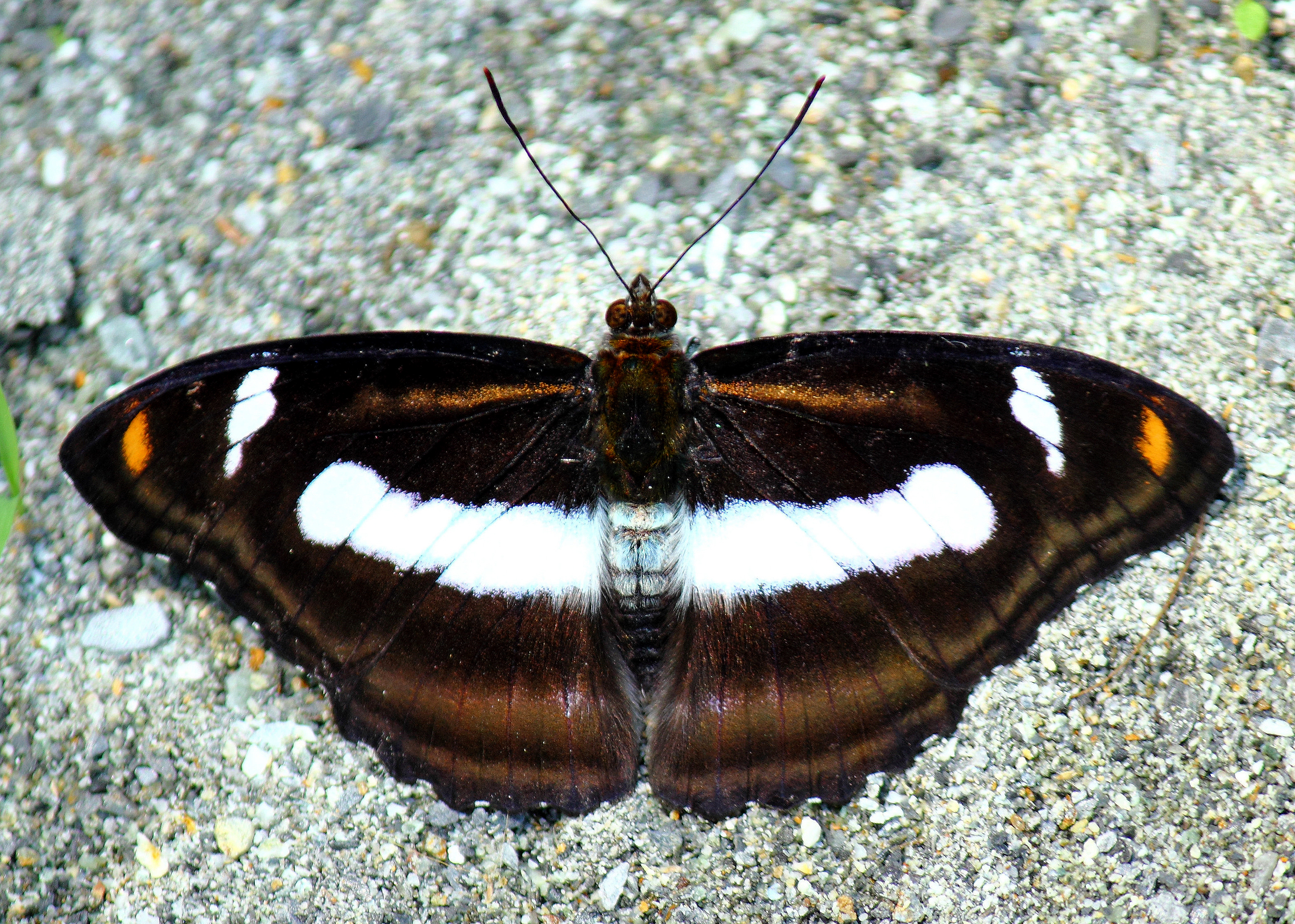
Dorsal view

===== Species: Athyma inara (colour sergeant) =====
Subspecies: Athyma inara inara (Himalayan colour sergeant)

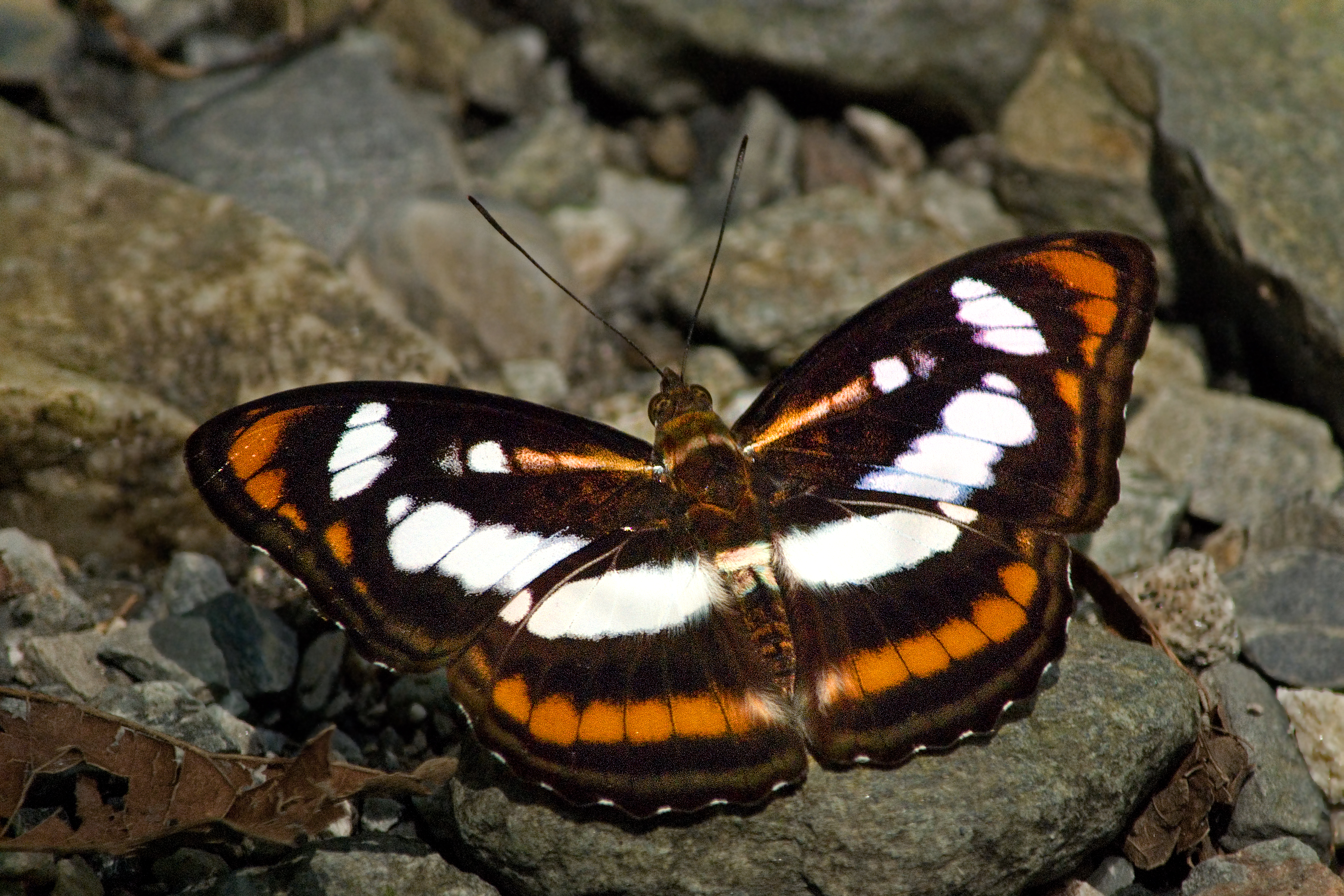
Dorsal view

==== Genus: Auzakia ====
===== Species: Auzakia danava (commodore) =====
Subspecies: Auzakia danava danava (Indian commodore)

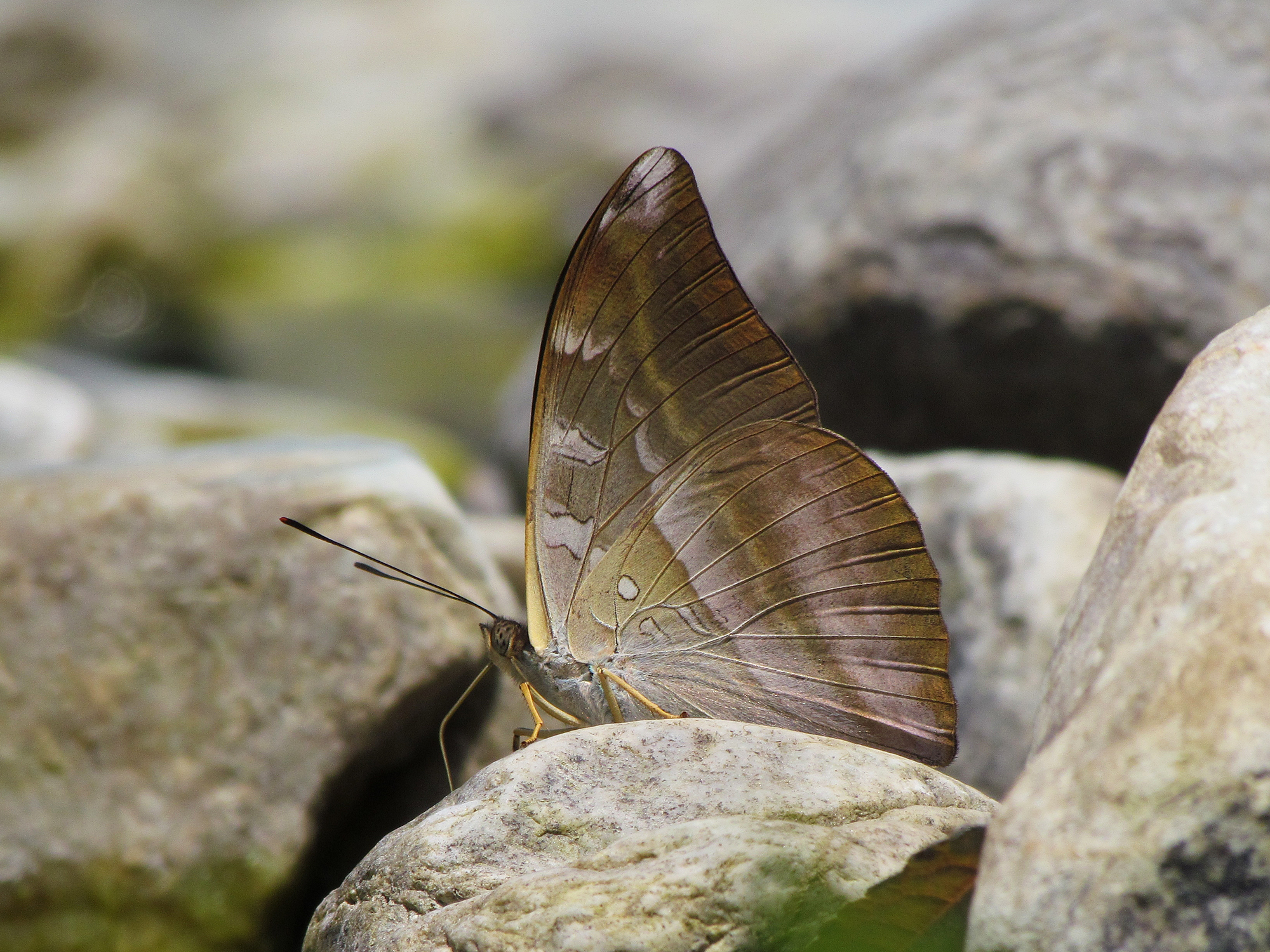
Ventral view

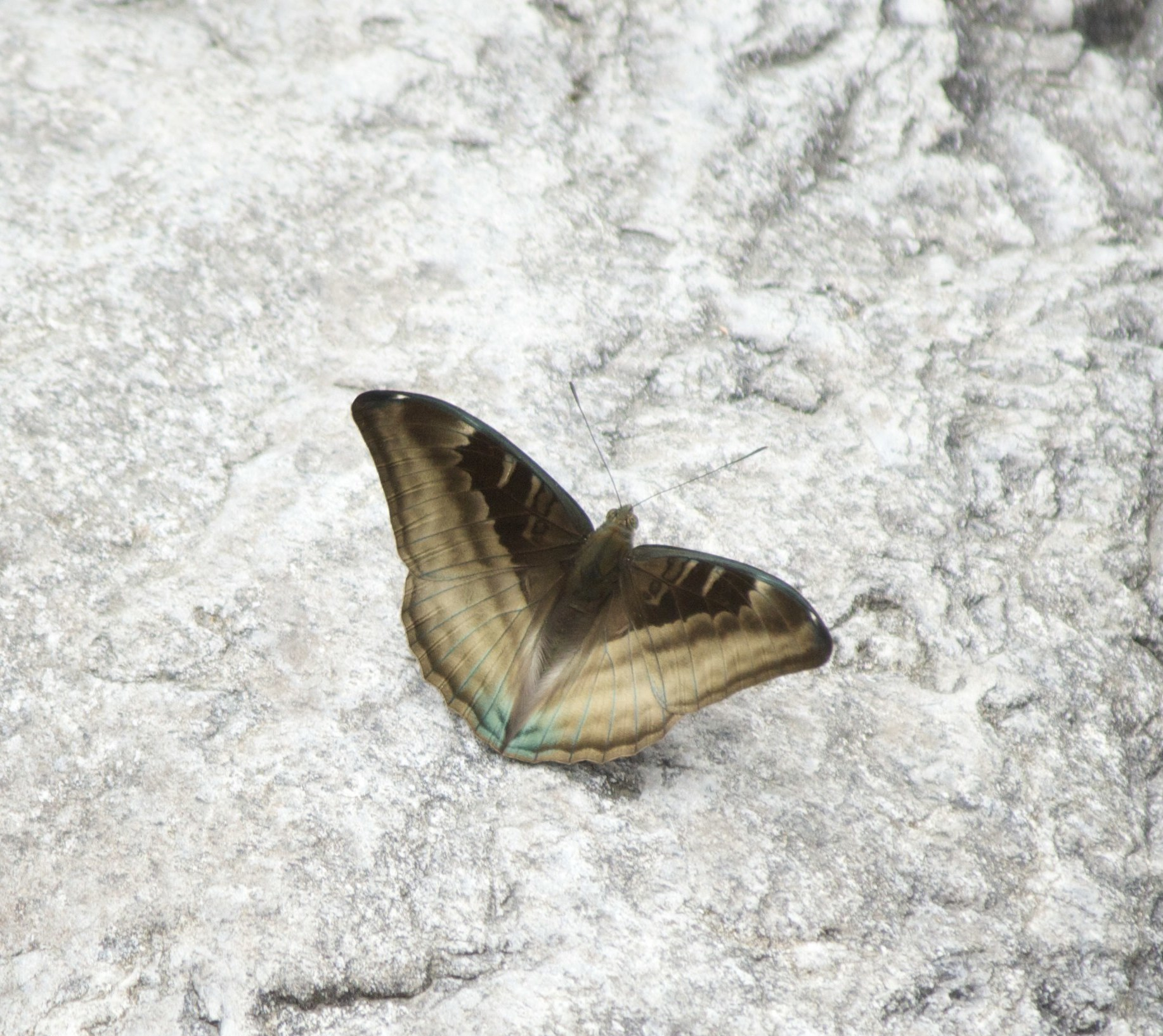
Dorsal view

==== Genus: Lebadea ====
===== Species: Lebadea martha (knight) =====
Subspecies: Lebadea martha martha (Thai knight)

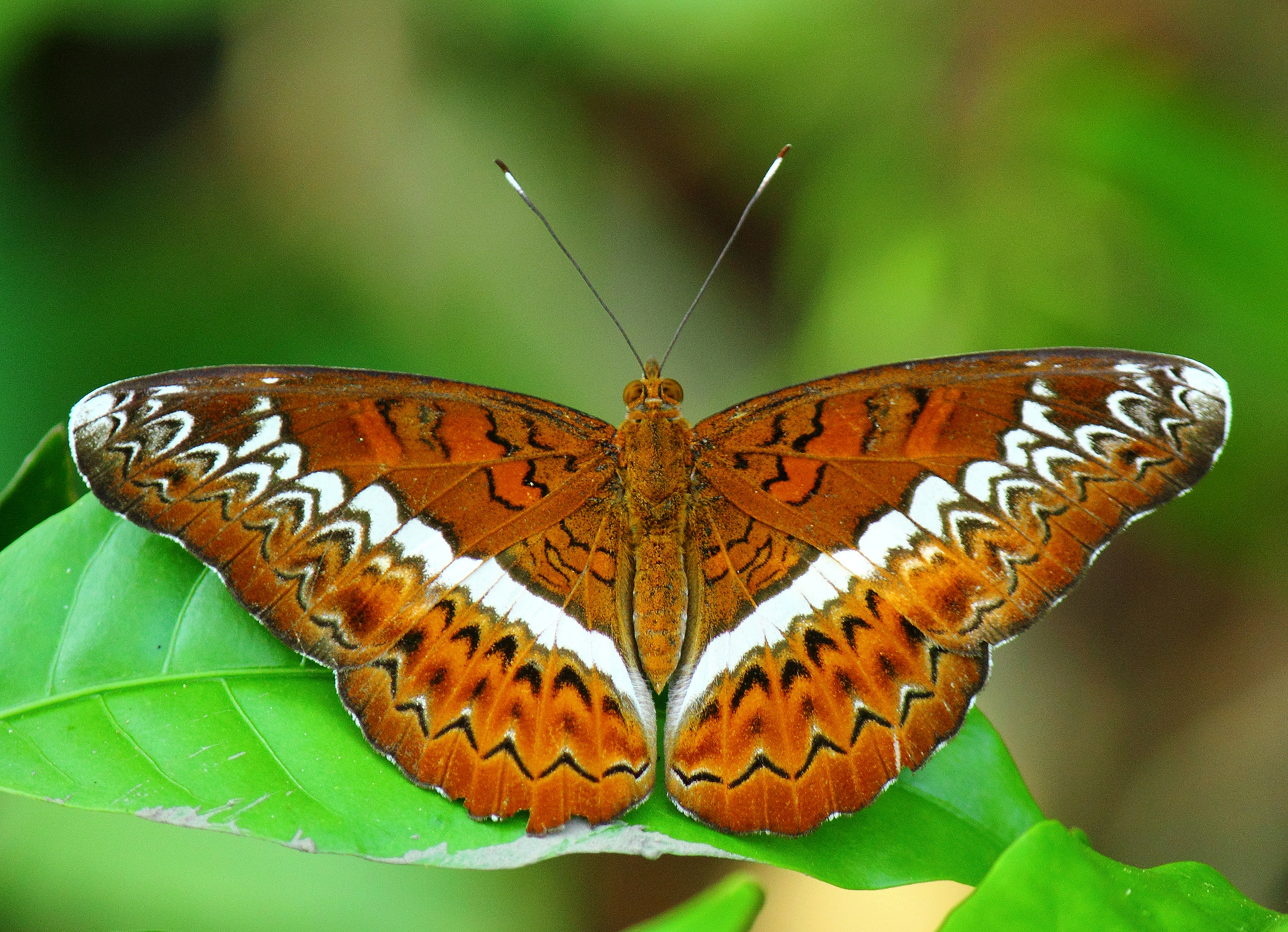
Dorsal view

==== Genus: Moduza ====
===== Species: Moduza procris (commander) =====
Subspecies: Moduza procris procris (Oriental commander)

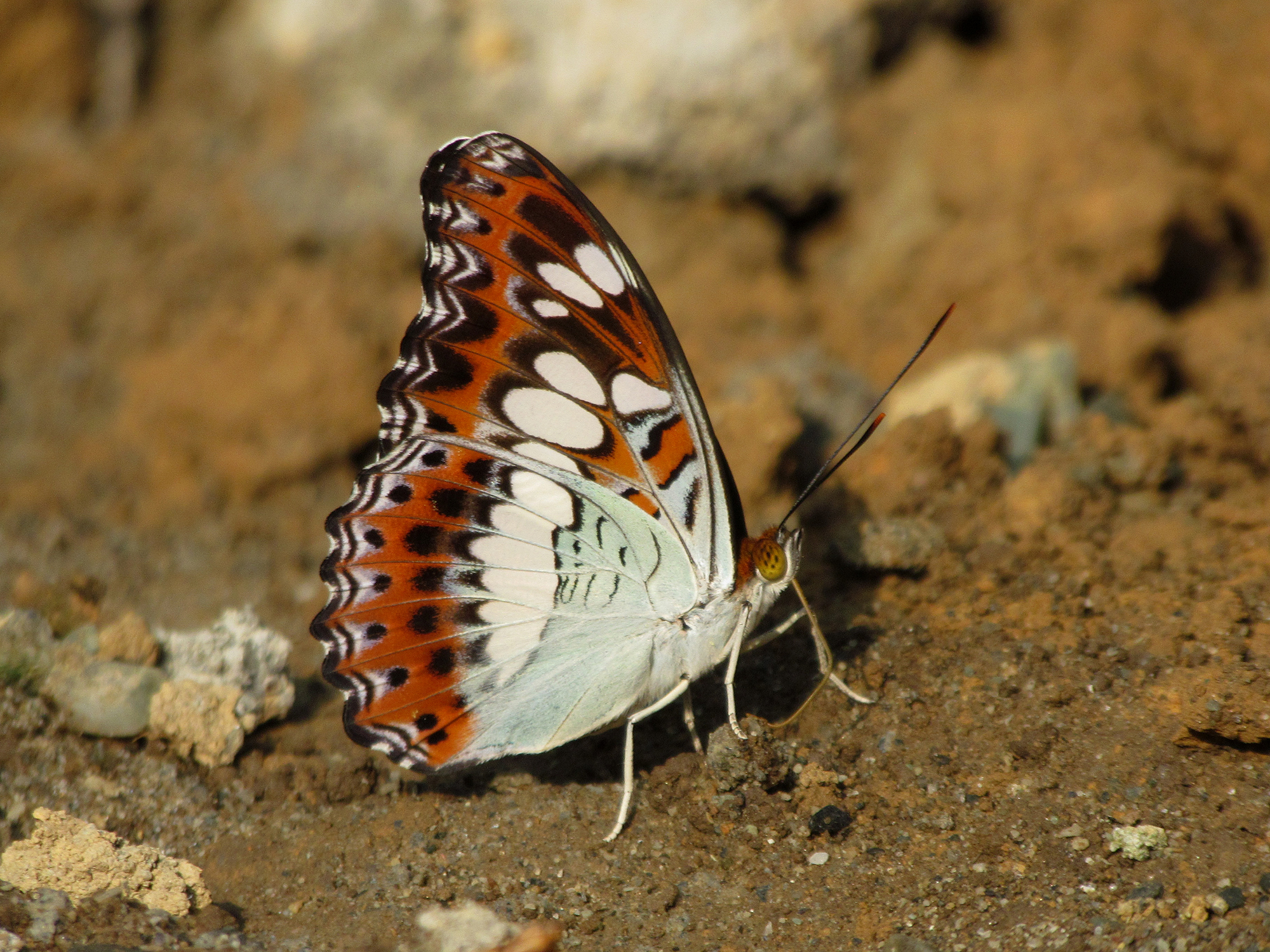
Ventral view

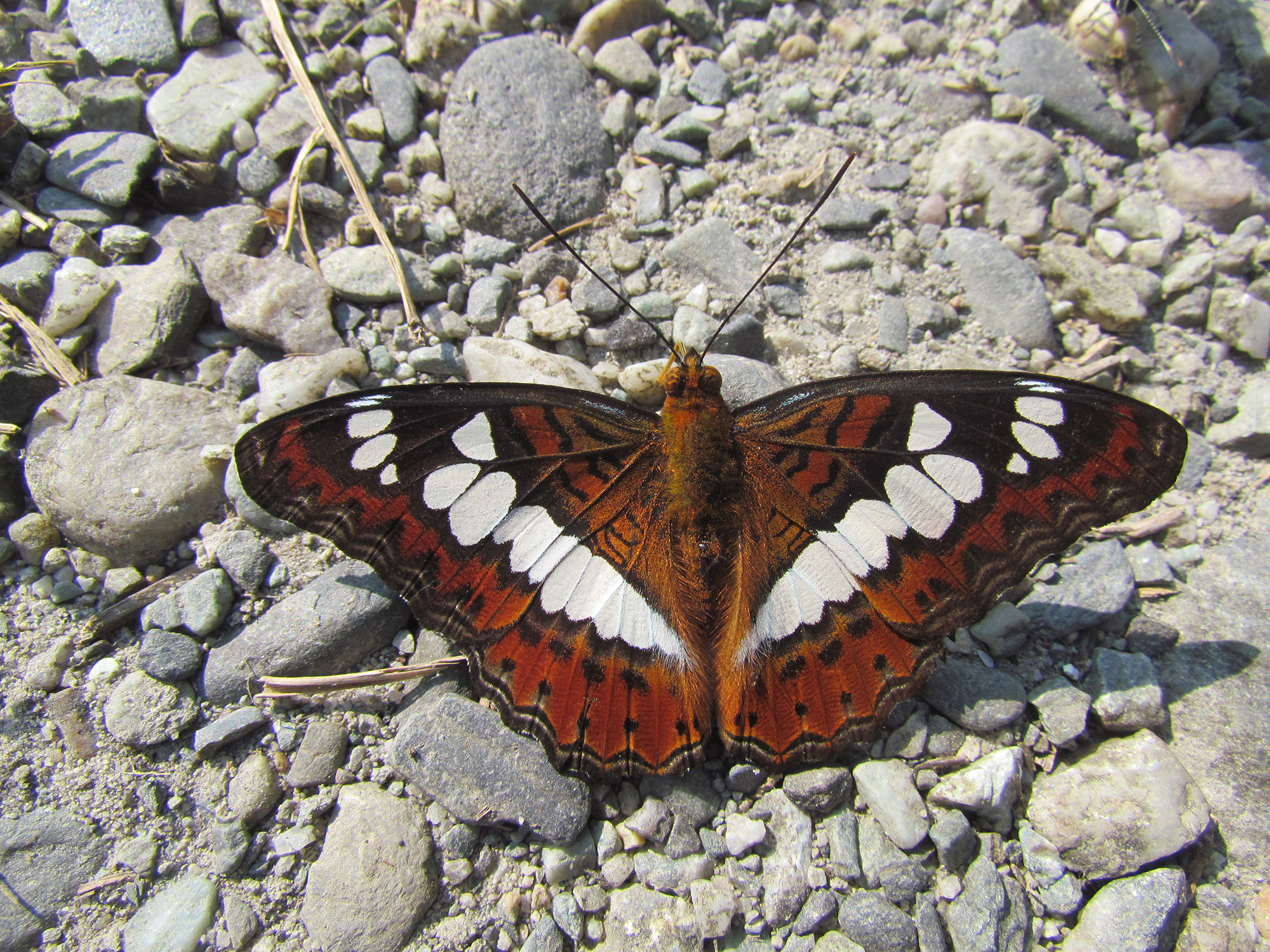
Dorsal view

==== Genus: Parasarpa ====
===== Species: Parasarpa dudu (white commodore) =====
Subspecies: Parasarpa dudu dudu (Sylhet white commodore)

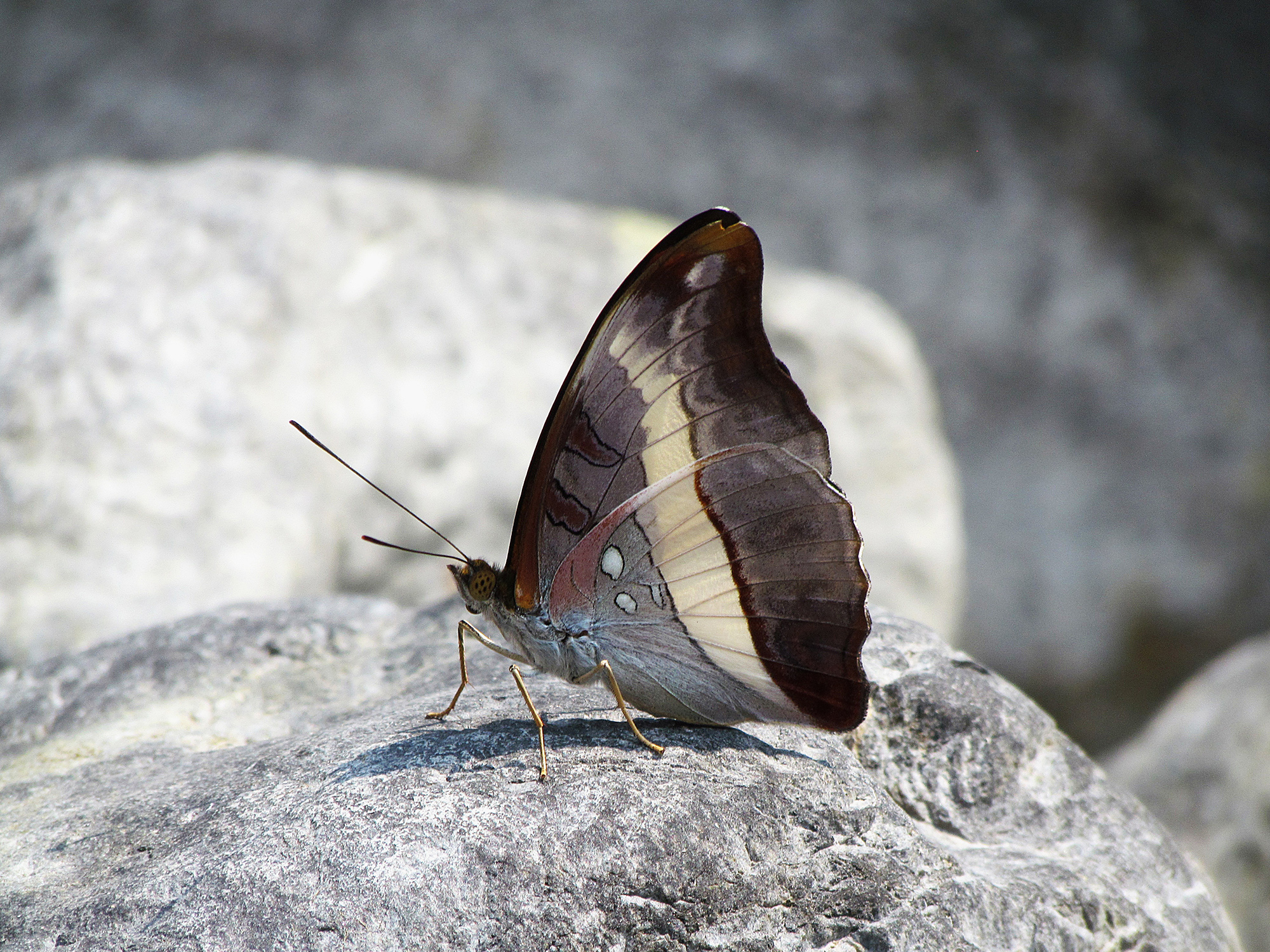
Ventral view

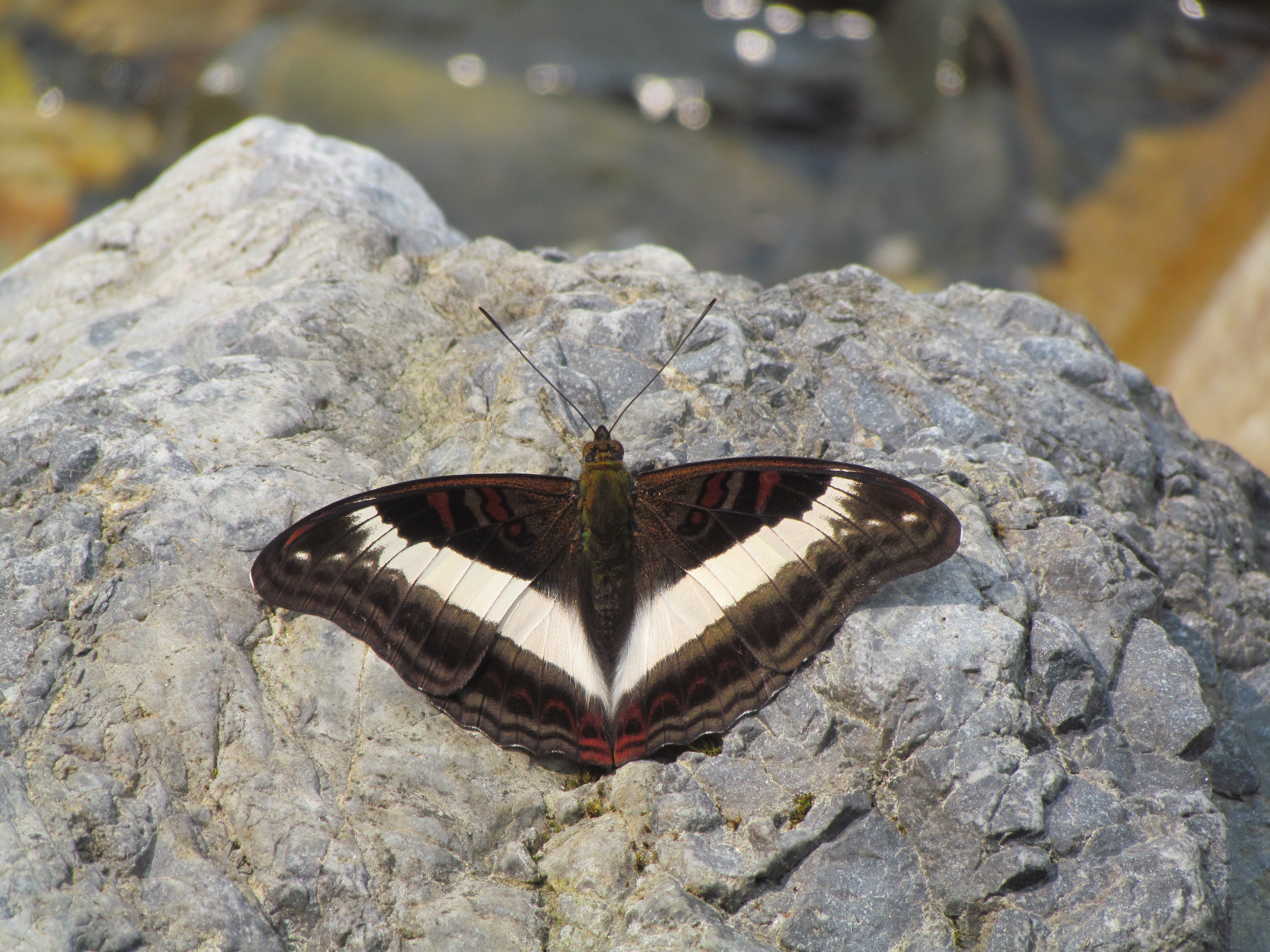
Dorsal view

Tribe: Neptini

==== Genus: Lasippa ====
===== Species: Lasippa viraja (yellowjack sailer) =====
Subspecies: Lasippa viraja viraja (Bengal yellowjack sailer)

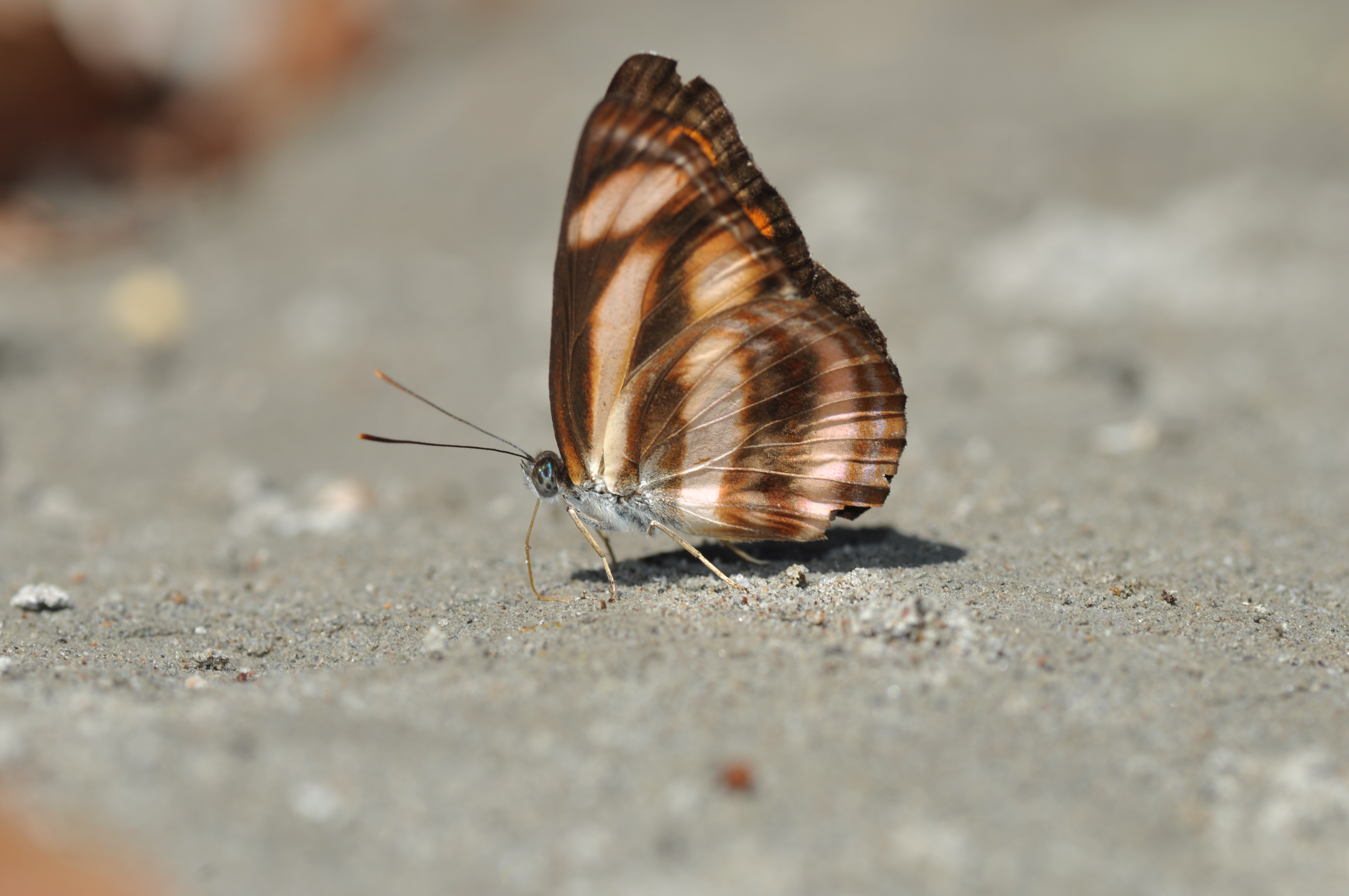
Ventral view

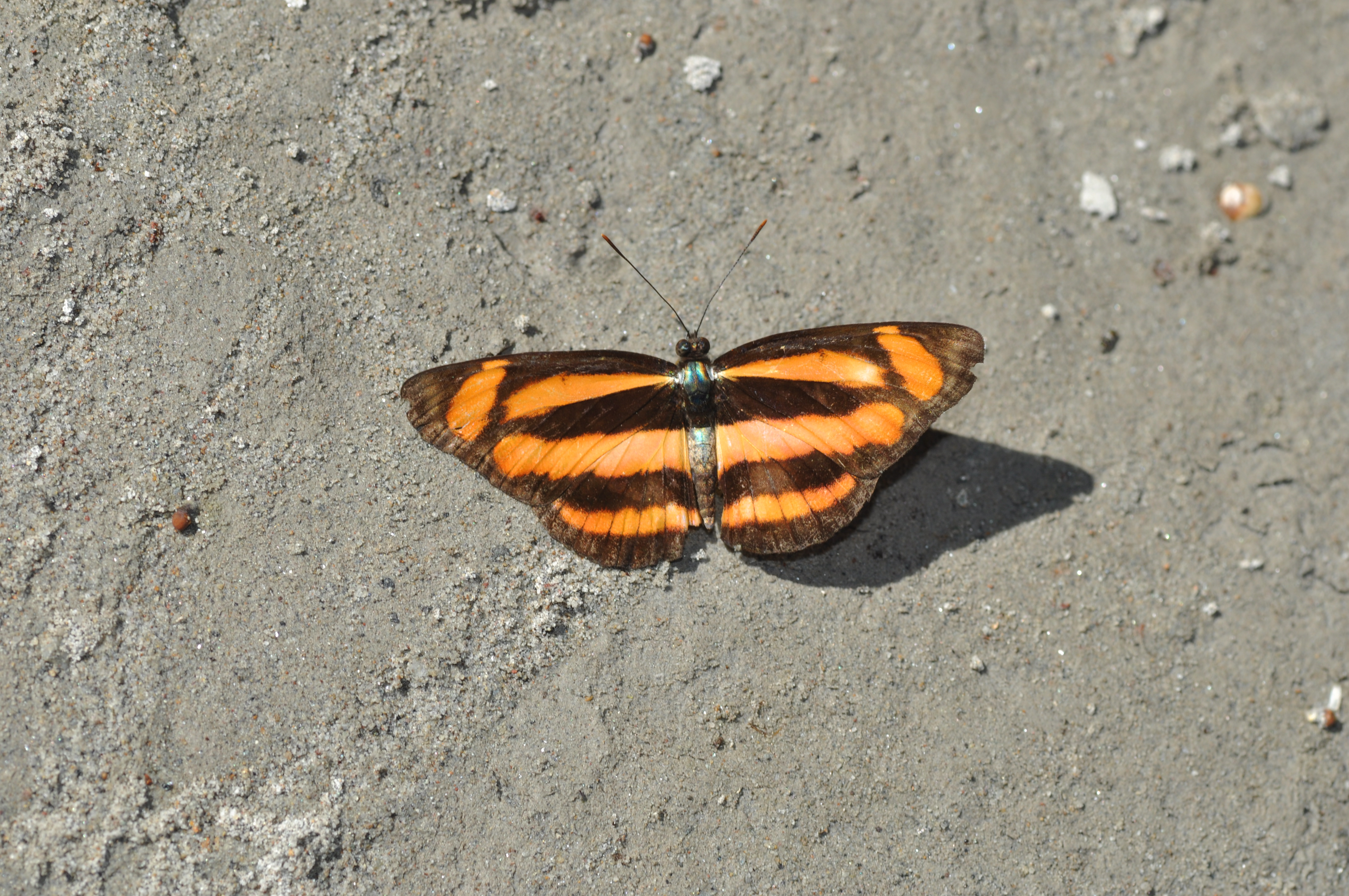
Dorsal view

==== Genus: Neptis ====
===== Species: Neptis hylas (common sailer) =====
Subspecies: Neptis hylas varmona (Indian common sailer)

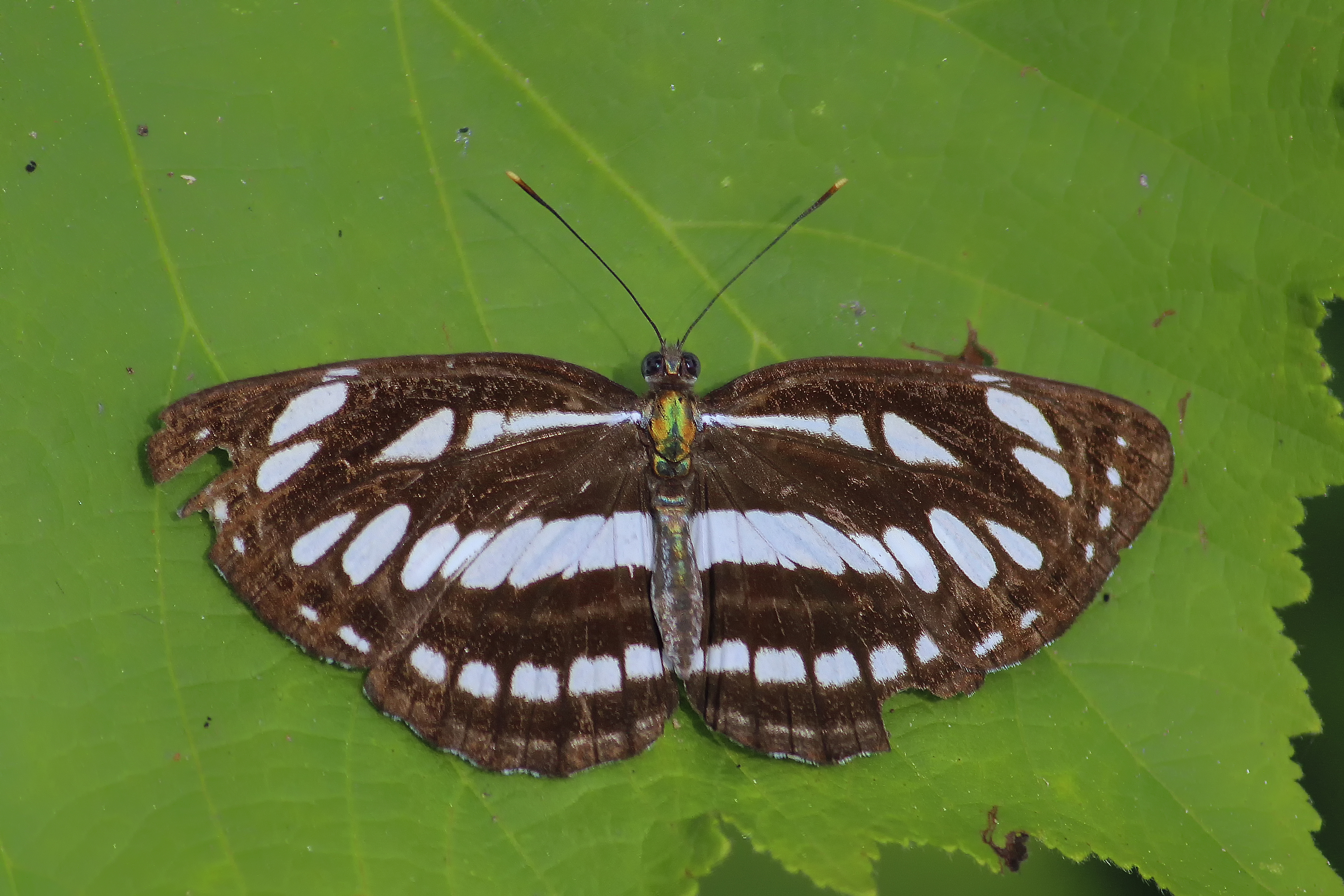
Dorsal view

===== Species: Neptis zaida (pale green sailer) =====
Subspecies: Neptis zaida bhutanica (east Himalayan pale green sailer)

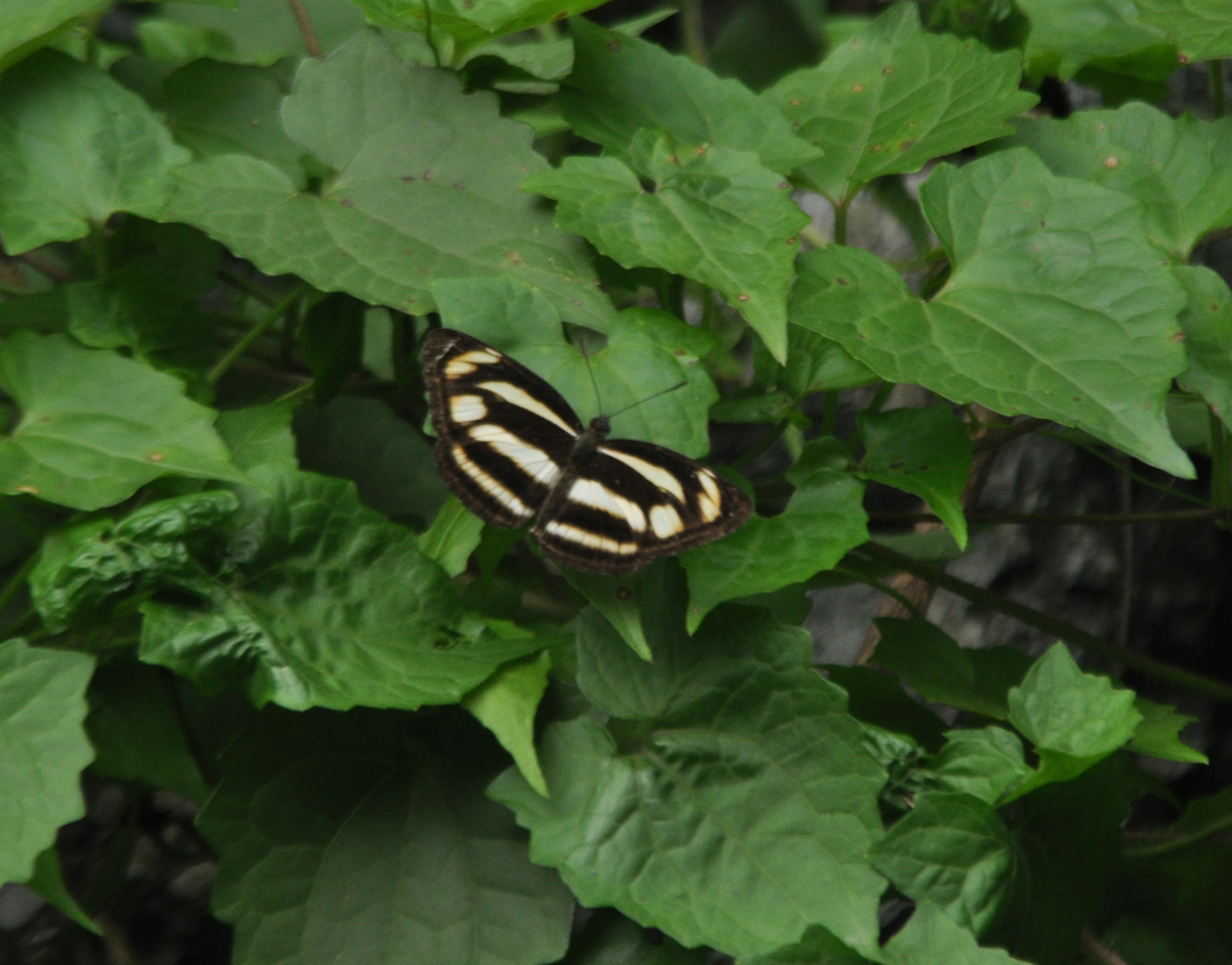
Dorsal view

==== Genus: Pantoporia ====
===== Species: Pantoporia hordonia (common lascar) =====
Subspecies: Pantoporia hordonia hordonia (Oriental common lascar)

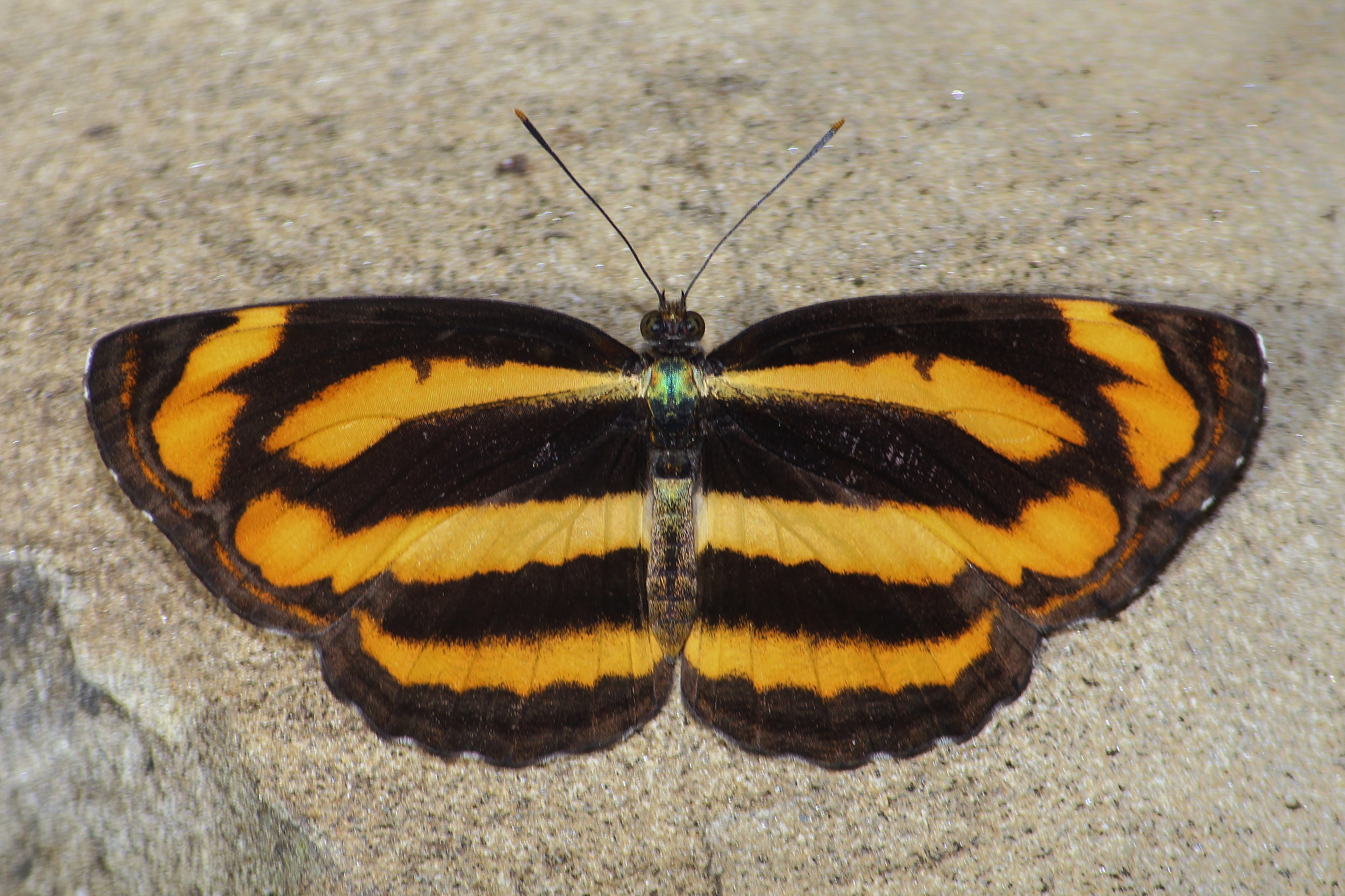
Dorsal view

=== Subfamily: Nymphalinae ===
Tribe: Junoniini

==== Genus: Hypolimnas ====
===== Species: Hypolimnas bolina (great eggfly) =====
Subspecies: Hypolimnas bolina jacintha (Oriental great eggfly)

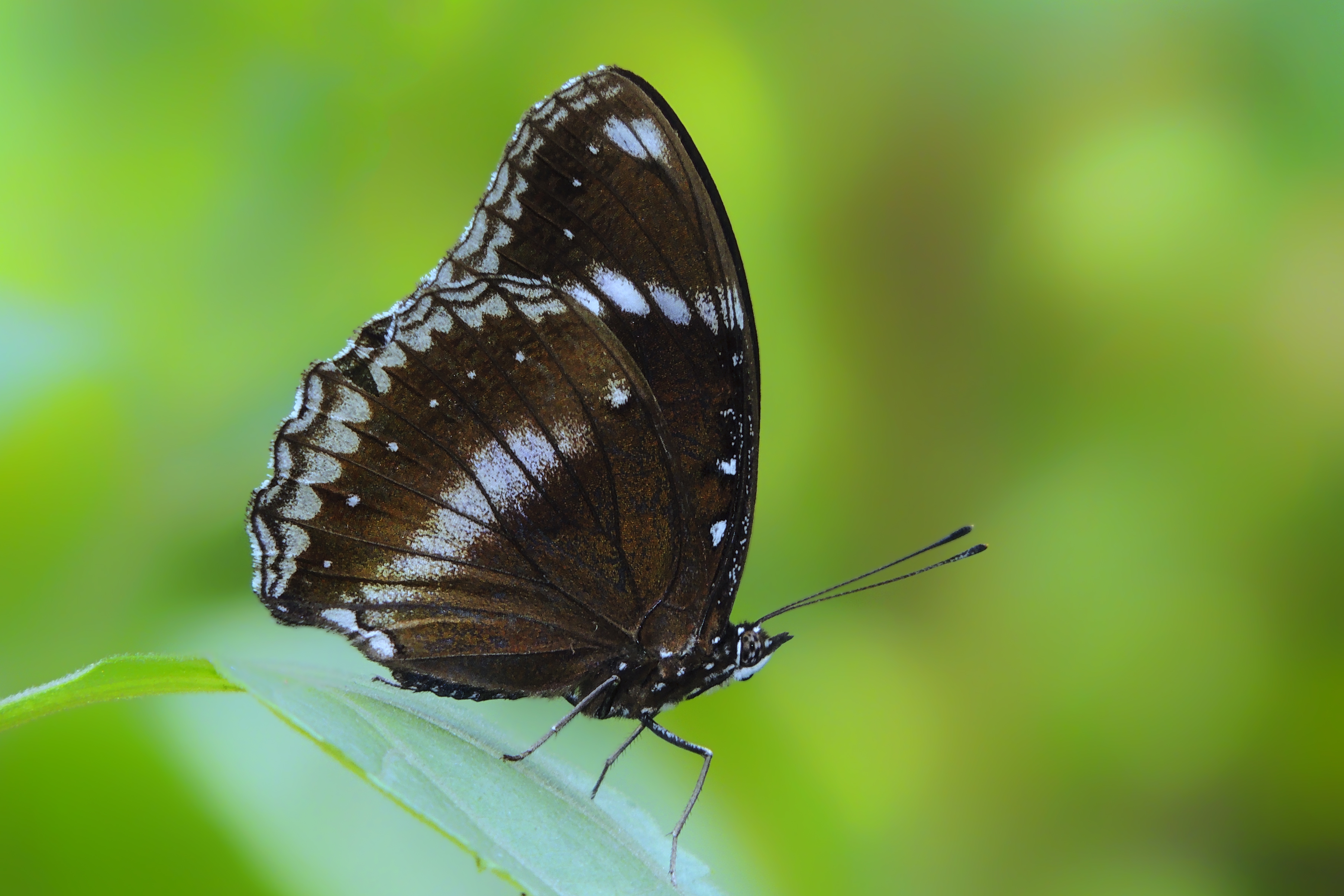
Ventral view

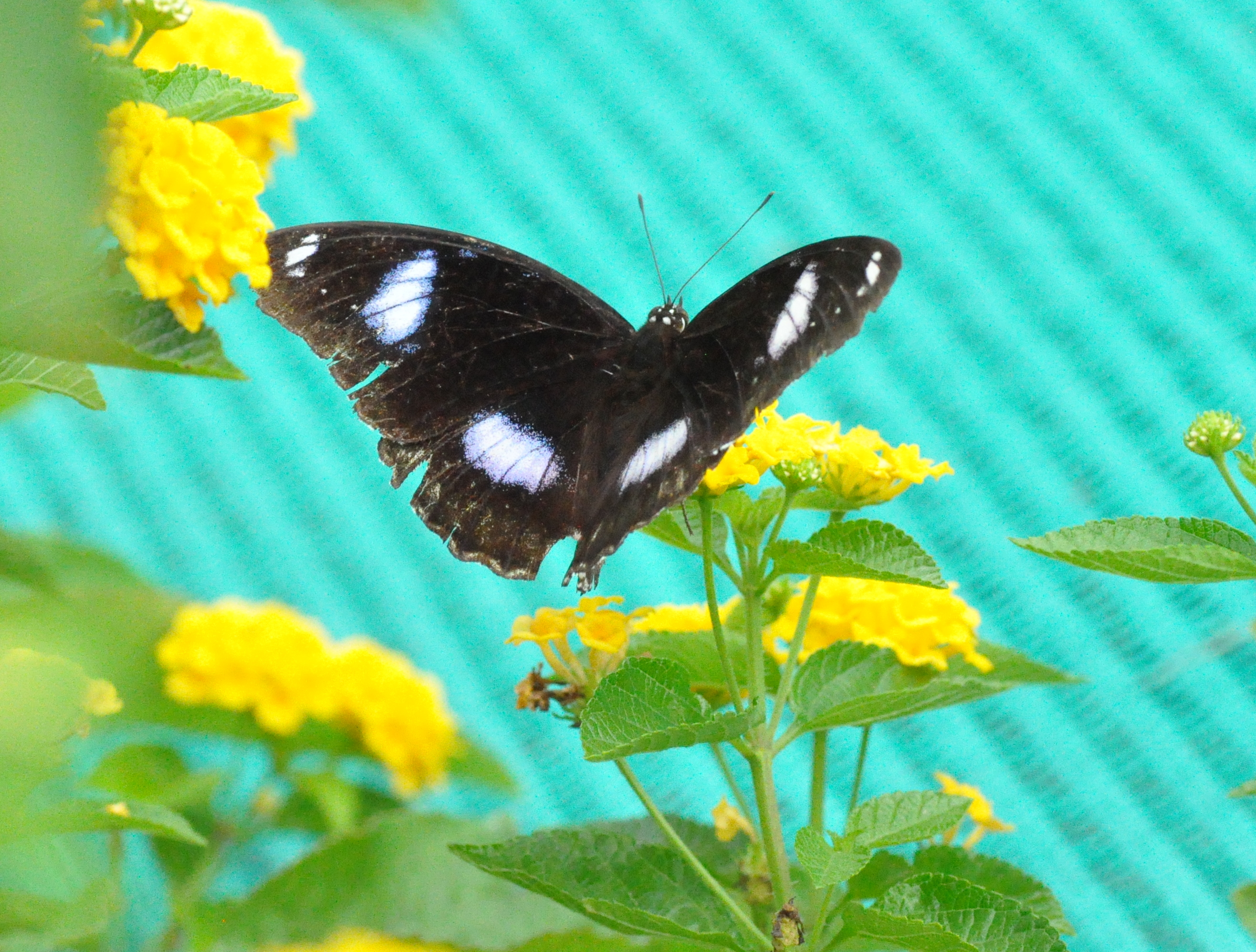
Dorsal view

==== Genus: Junonia ====
===== Species: Junonia almana (peacock pansy) =====
Subspecies: Junonia almana almana (Oriental peacock pansy)

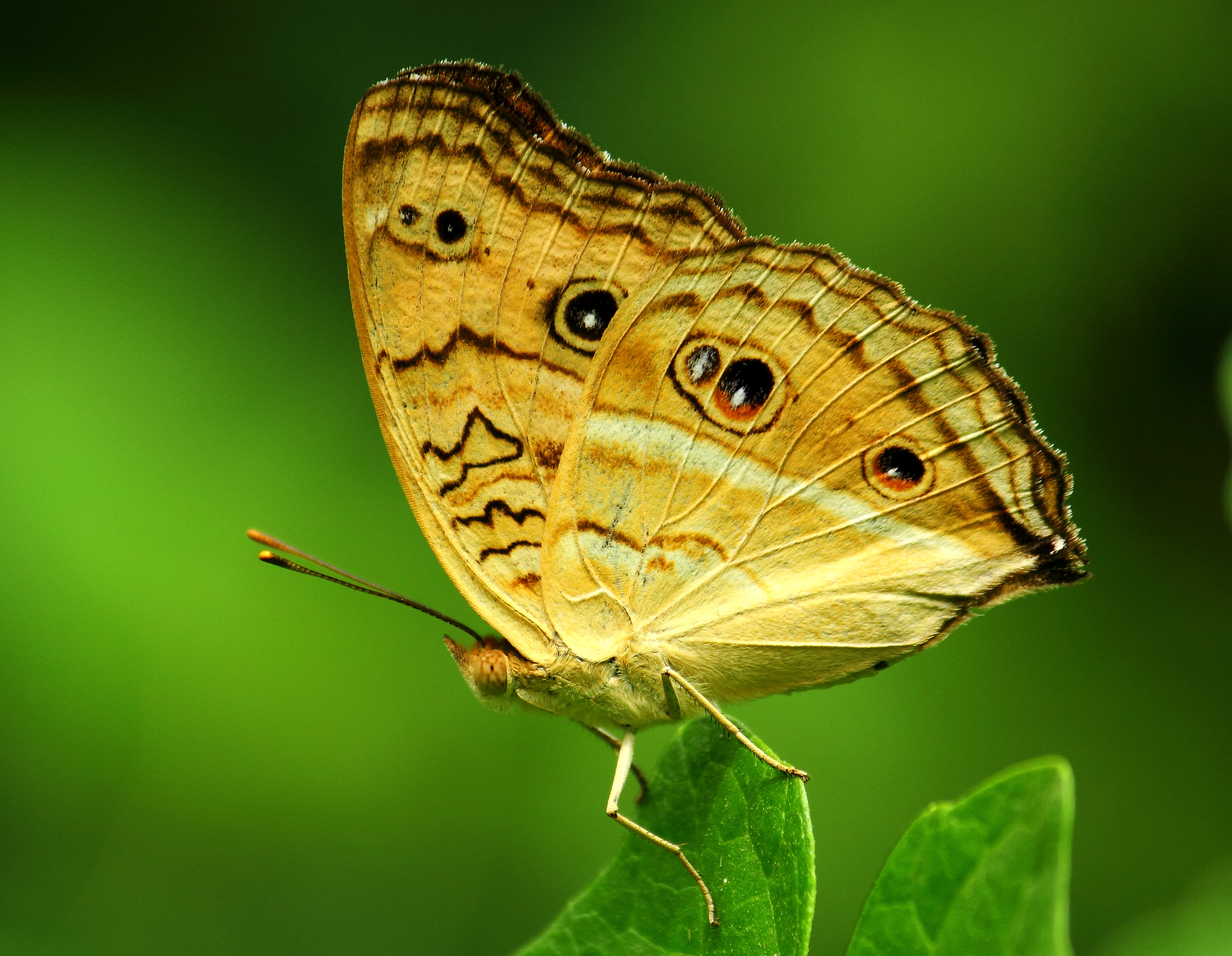
Ventral view

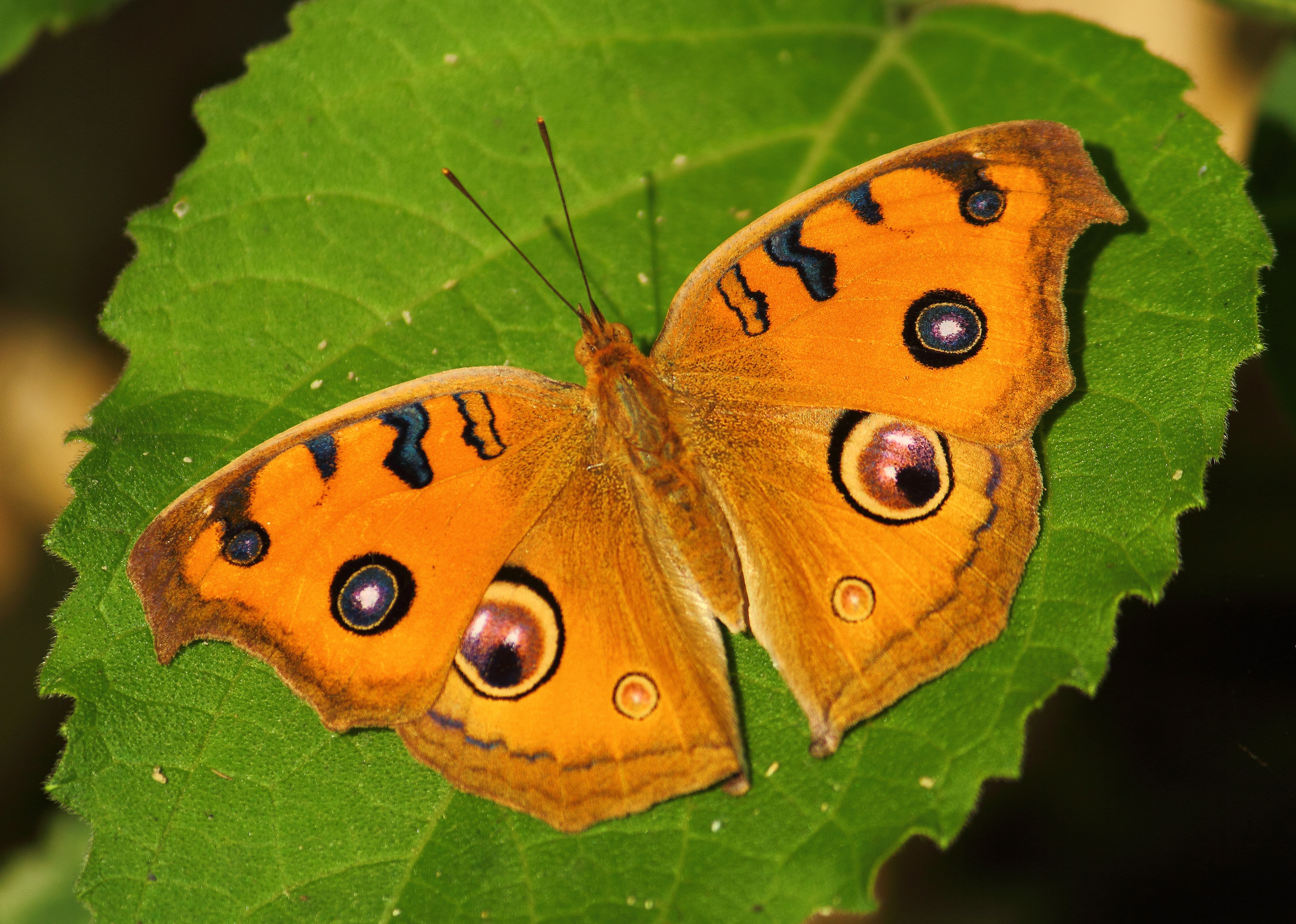
Dorsal view

===== Species: Junonia atlites (grey pansy) =====
Subspecies: Junonia atlites atlites (Oriental grey pansy)

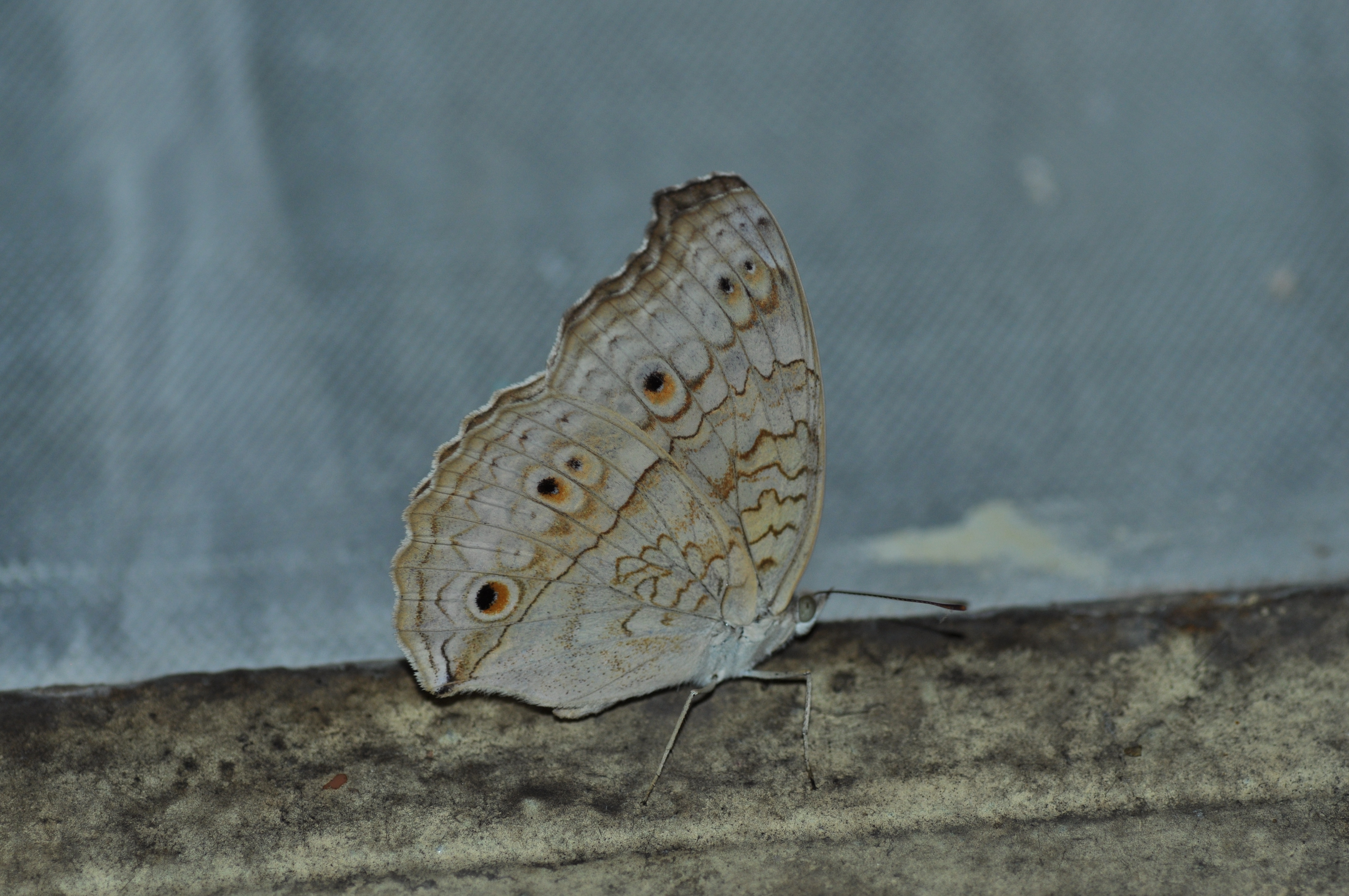
Ventral view

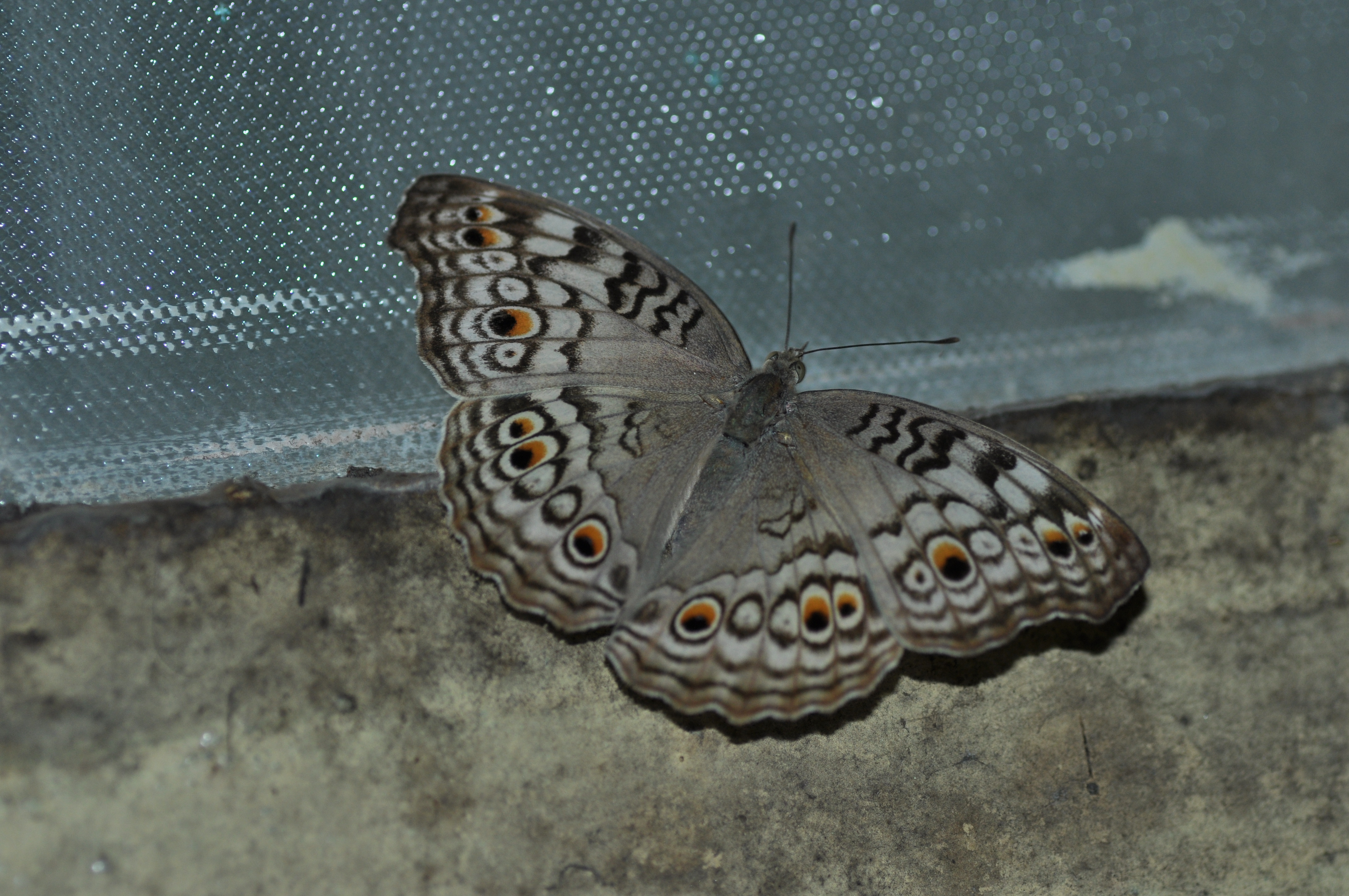
Dorsal view

===== Species: Junonia hierta (yellow pansy) =====
Subspecies: Junonia hierta hierta (Oriental yellow pansy)

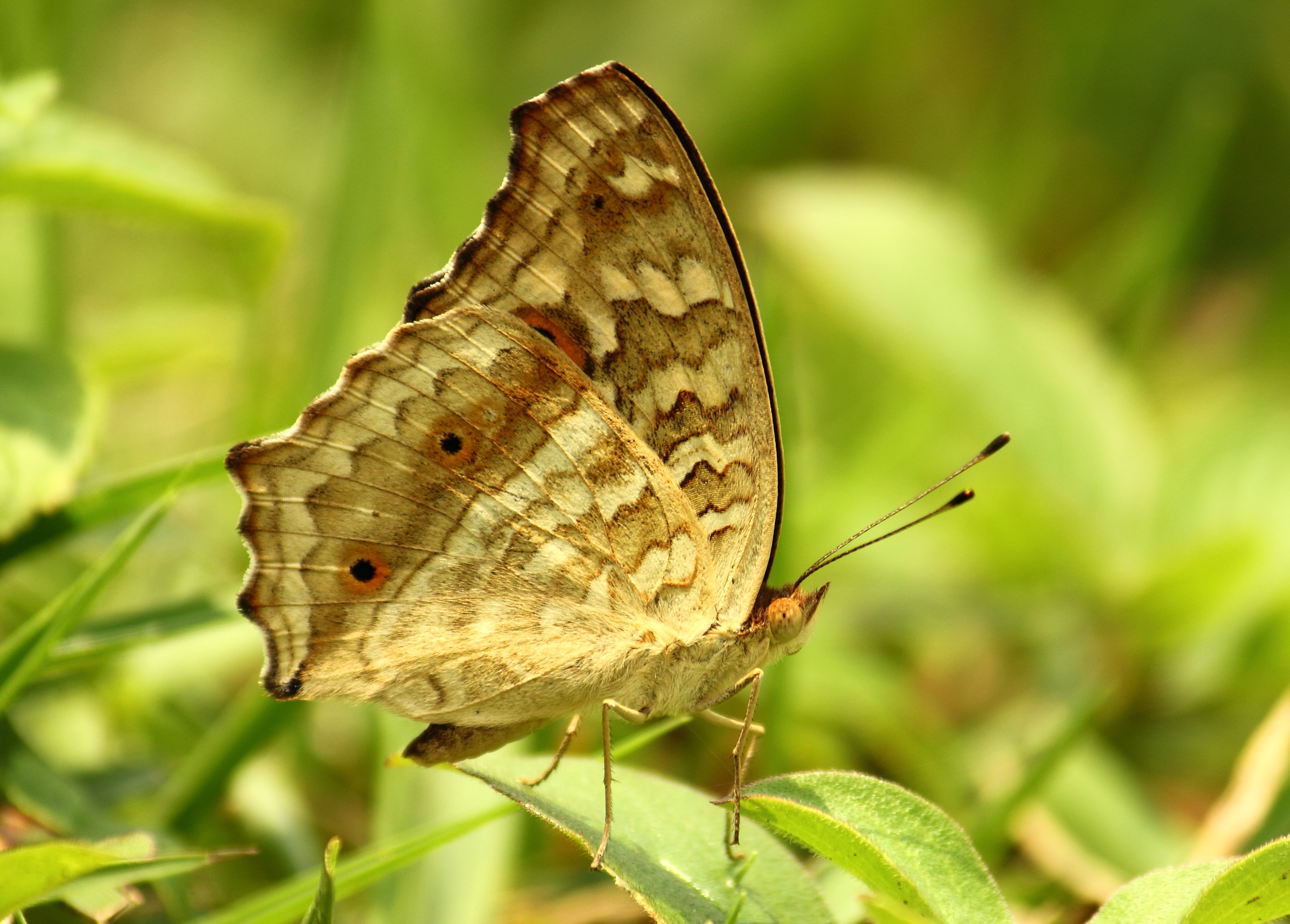
Ventral view

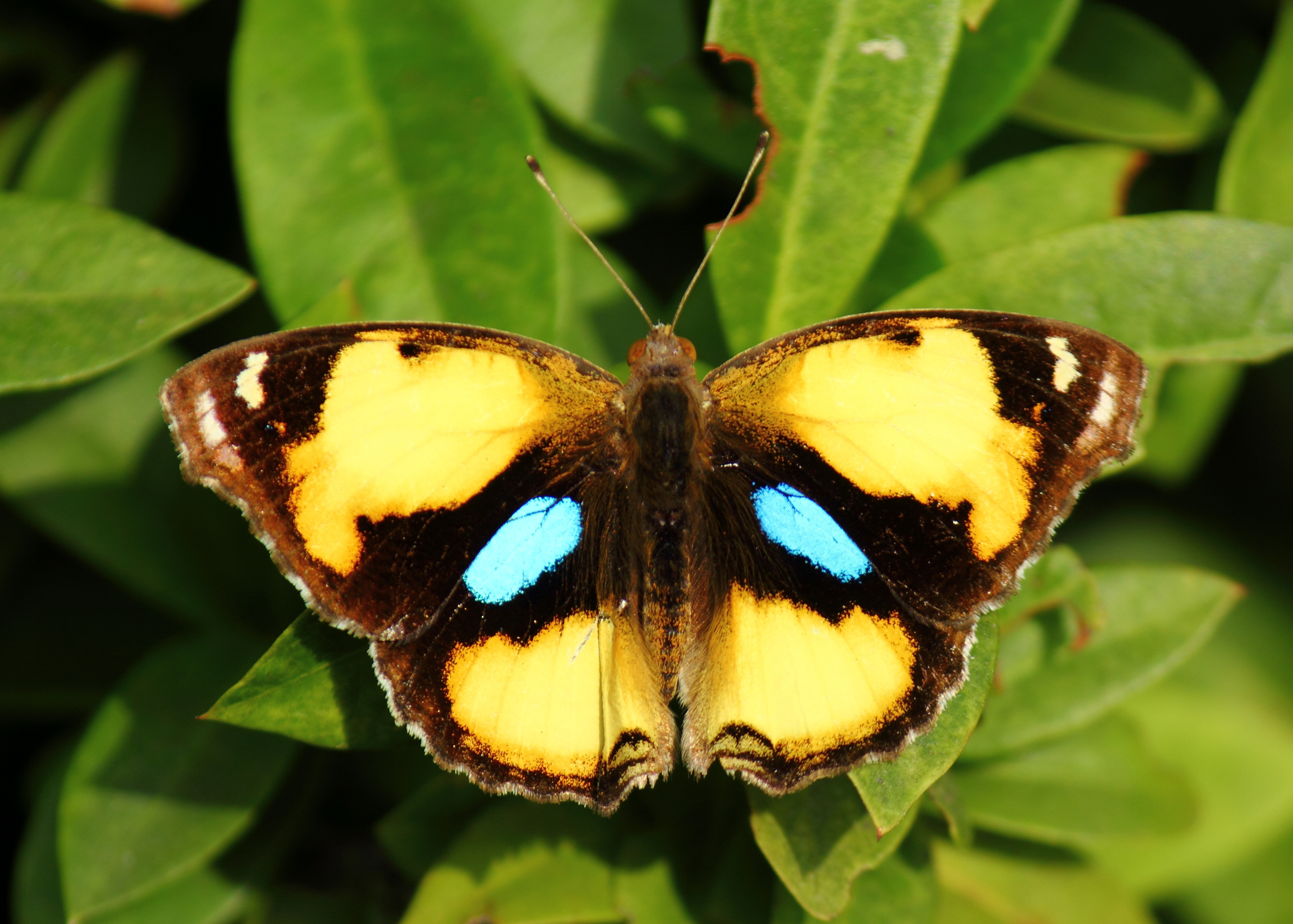
Dorsal view

===== Species: Junonia iphita (chocolate pansy) =====
Subspecies: Junonia iphita iphita (Oriental chocolate pansy)

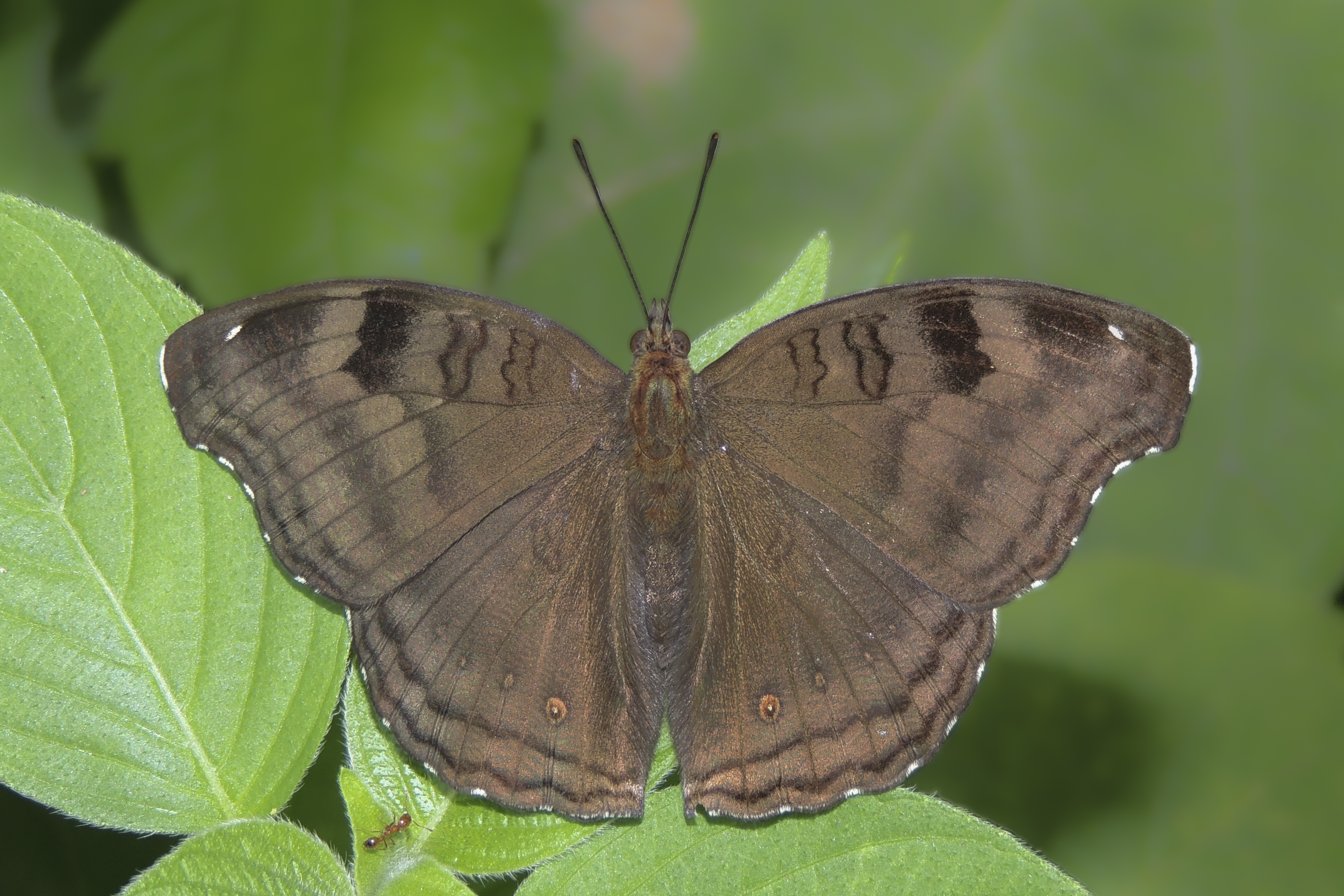
Dorsal view

===== Species: Junonia lemonias (lemon pansy) =====
Subspecies: Junonia lemonias lemonias (Chinese lemon pansy)

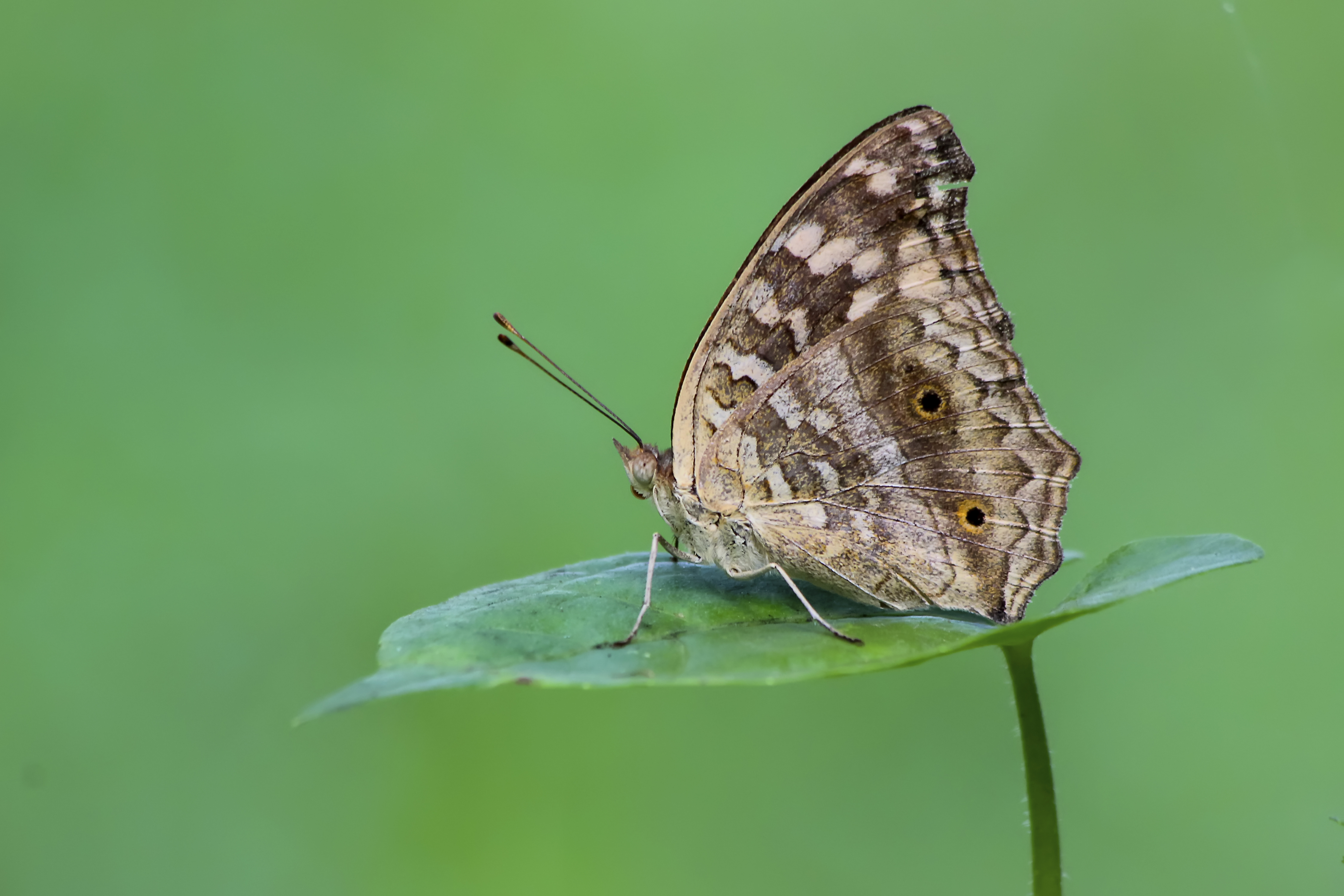
Ventral view

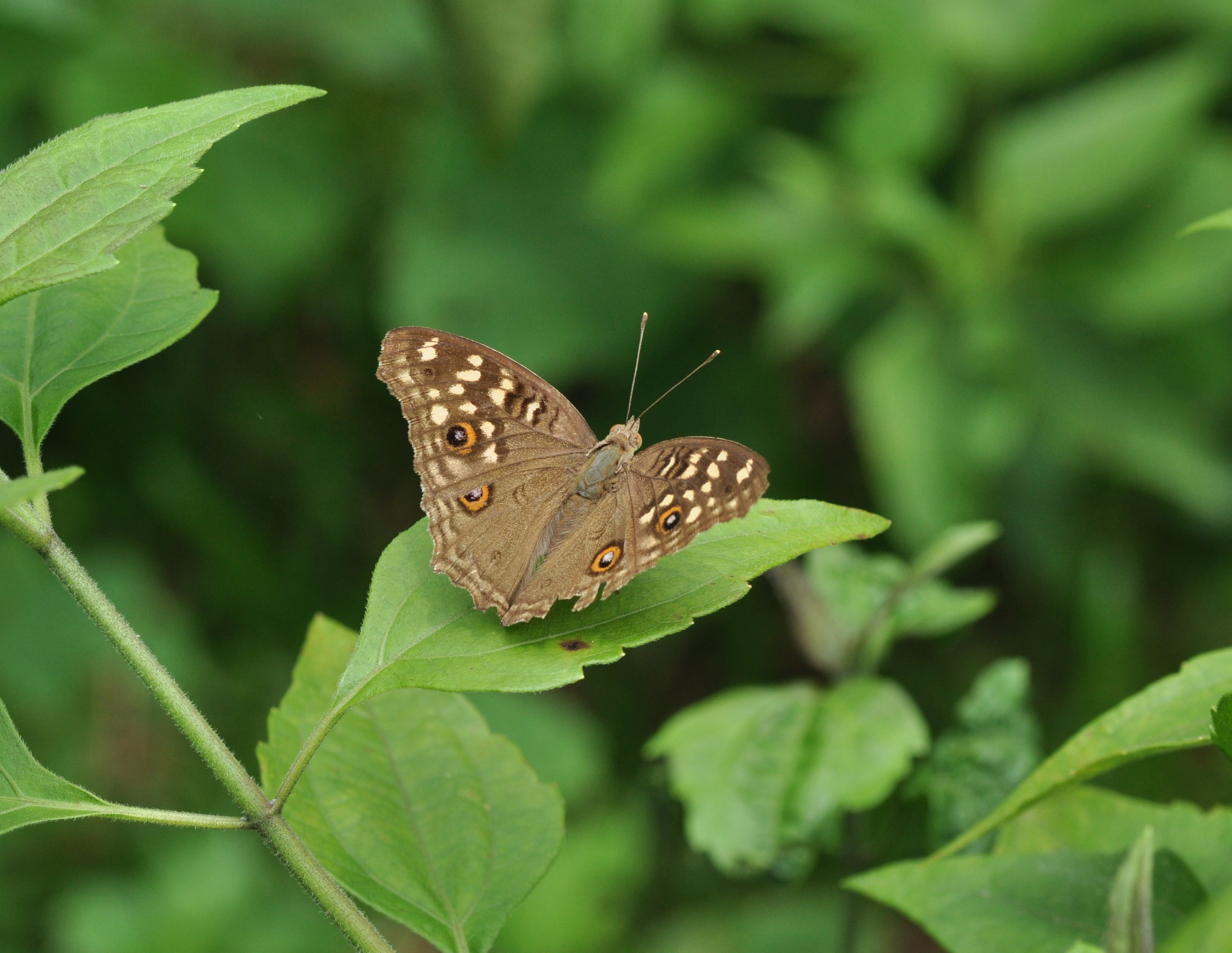
Dorsal view

===== Species: Junonia orithya (blue pansy) =====
Subspecies: Junonia orithya ocyale (dark blue pansy)

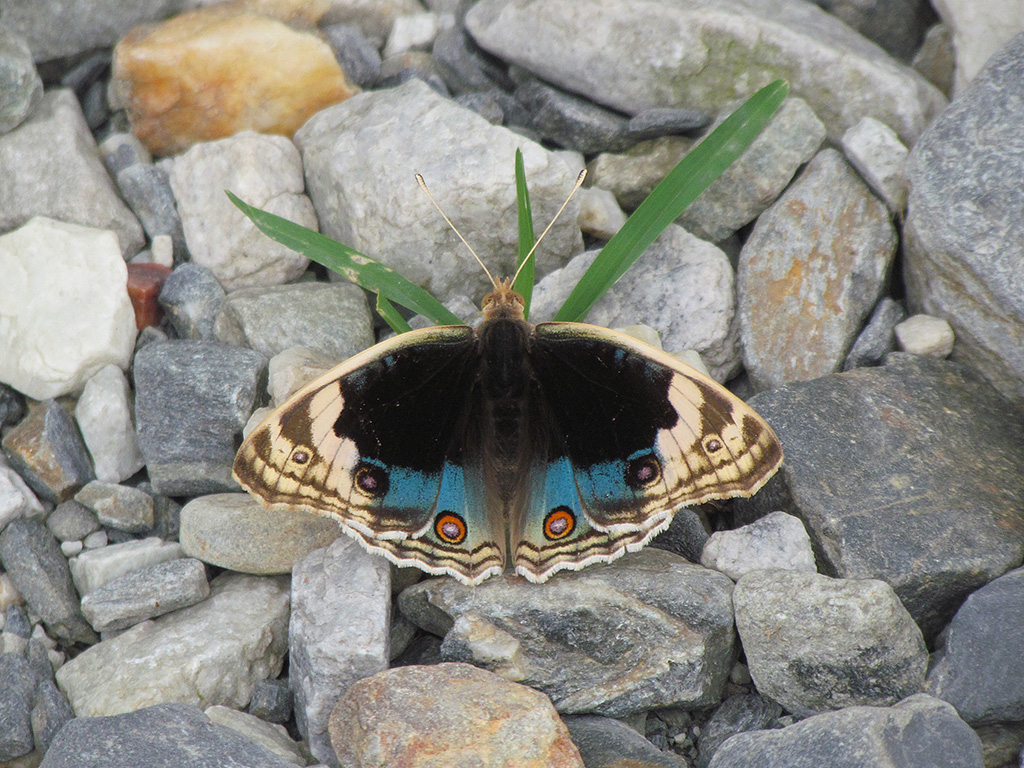
Dorsal view

Tribe: Kallimini

==== Genus: Doleschallia ====
===== Species: Doleschallia bisaltide (autumn leaf) =====
Subspecies: Doleschallia bisaltide indica (Himalayan autumn leaf)

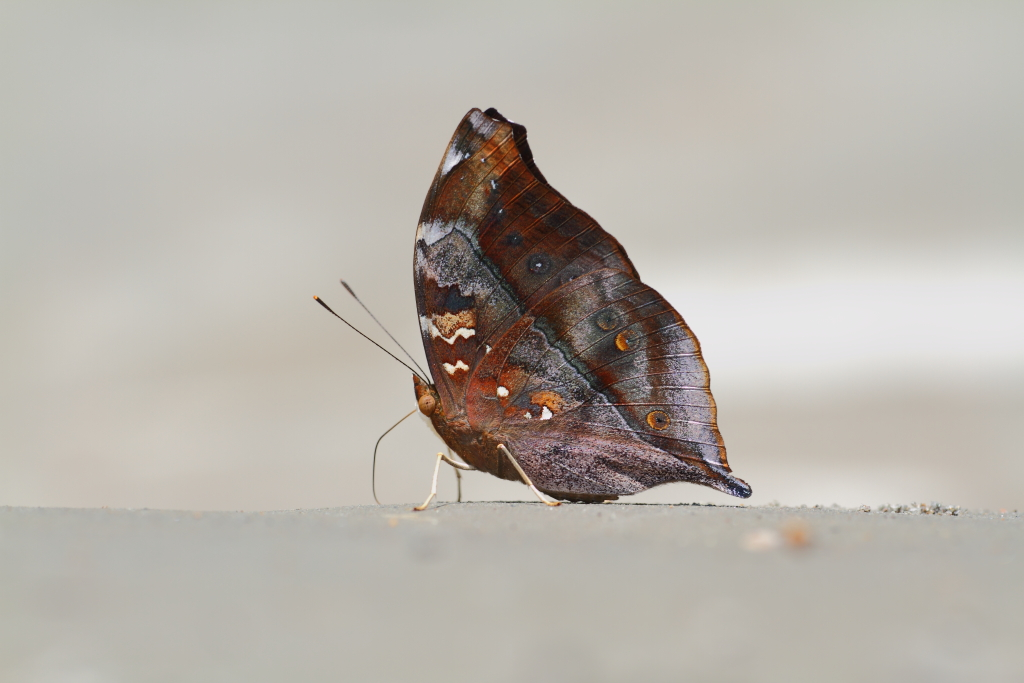
Ventral view

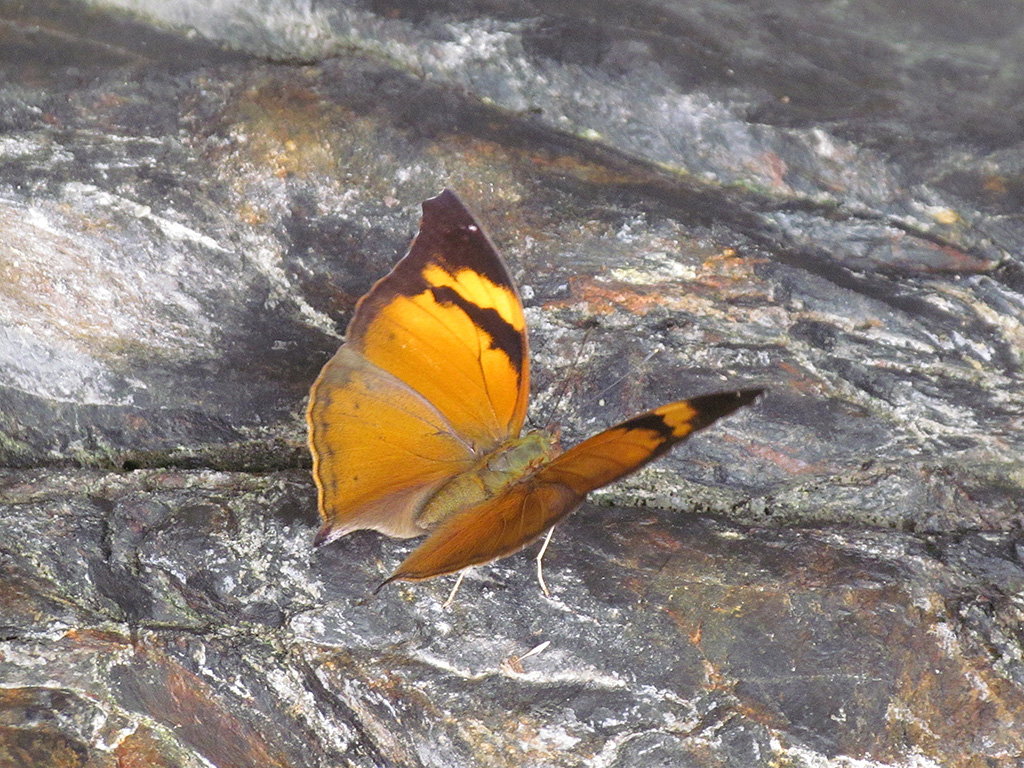
Dorsal view

==== Genus: Kallima ====
===== Species: Kallima inachus (orange oakleaf) =====
Subspecies: Kallima inachus inachus (Himalayan orange oakleaf)

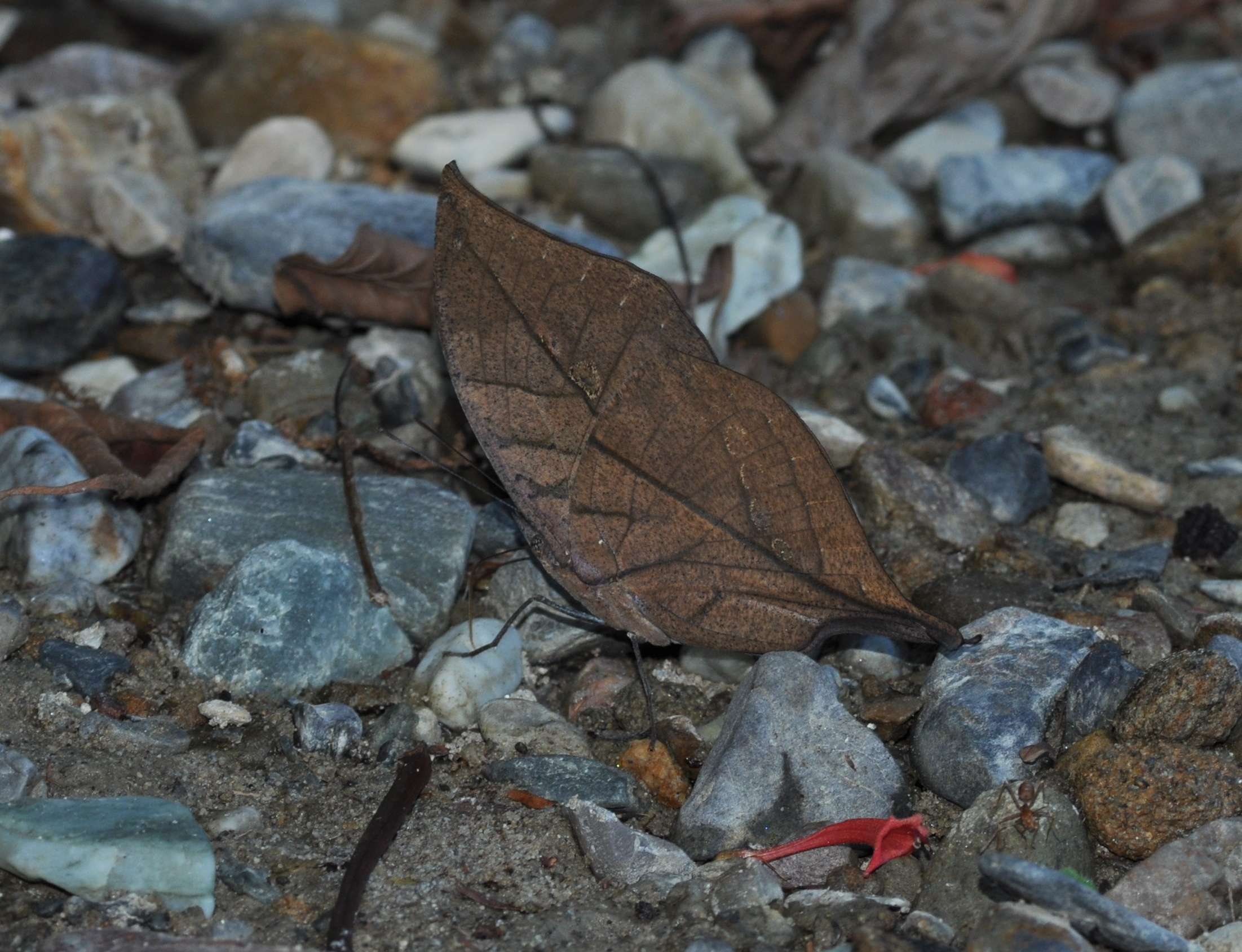
Ventral view

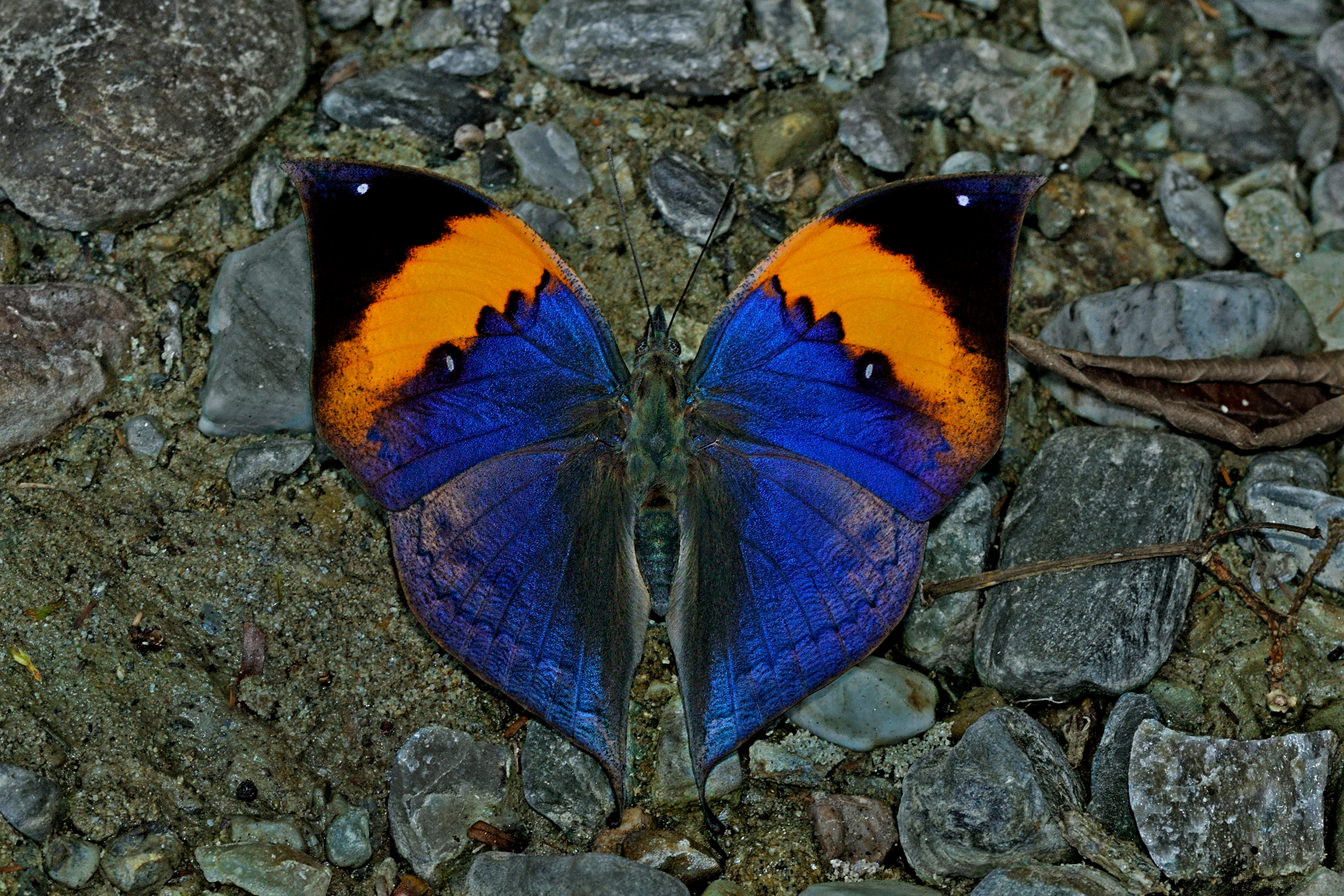
Dorsal view

Tribe: Nymphalini

==== Genus: Aglais ====
===== Species: Aglais caschmirensis (Indian tortoiseshell) =====
Subspecies: Aglais caschmirensis aesis (Himalayan tortoiseshell)

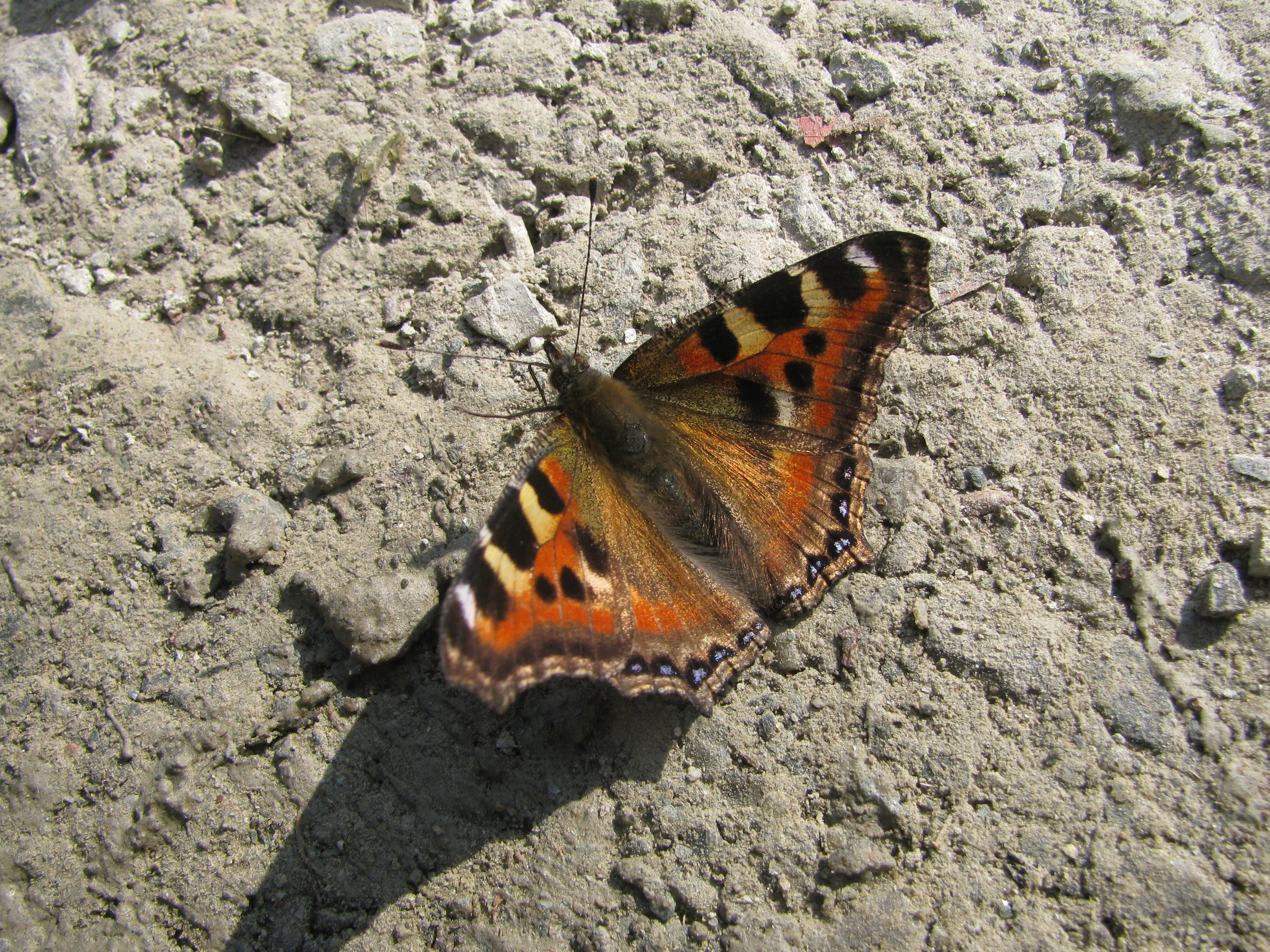
Dorsal view

==== Genus: Symbrenthia ====
===== Species: Symbrenthia lilaea (northern common jester) =====
Subspecies: Symbrenthia lilaea khasiana (Khasi common mester)

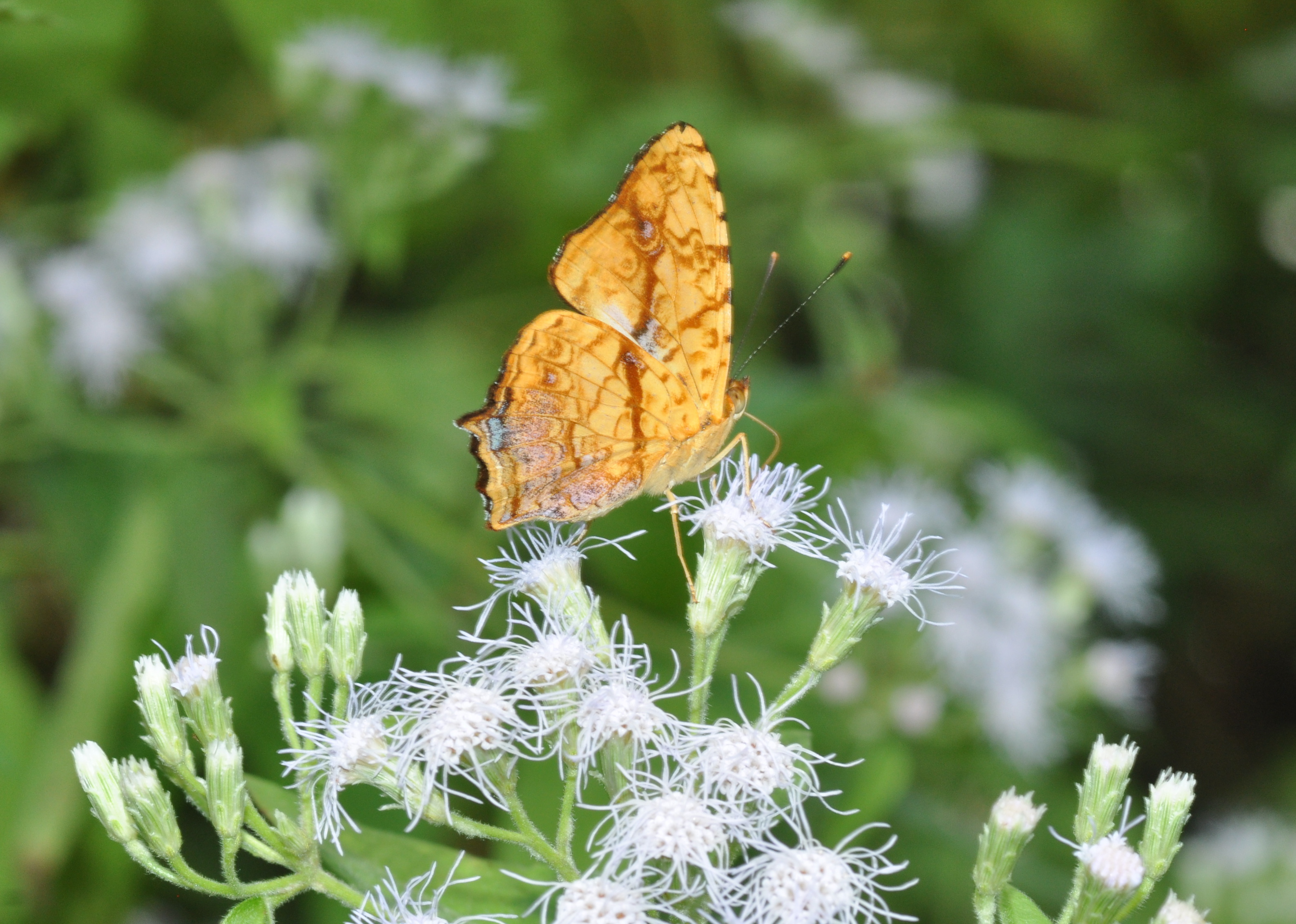
Ventral view

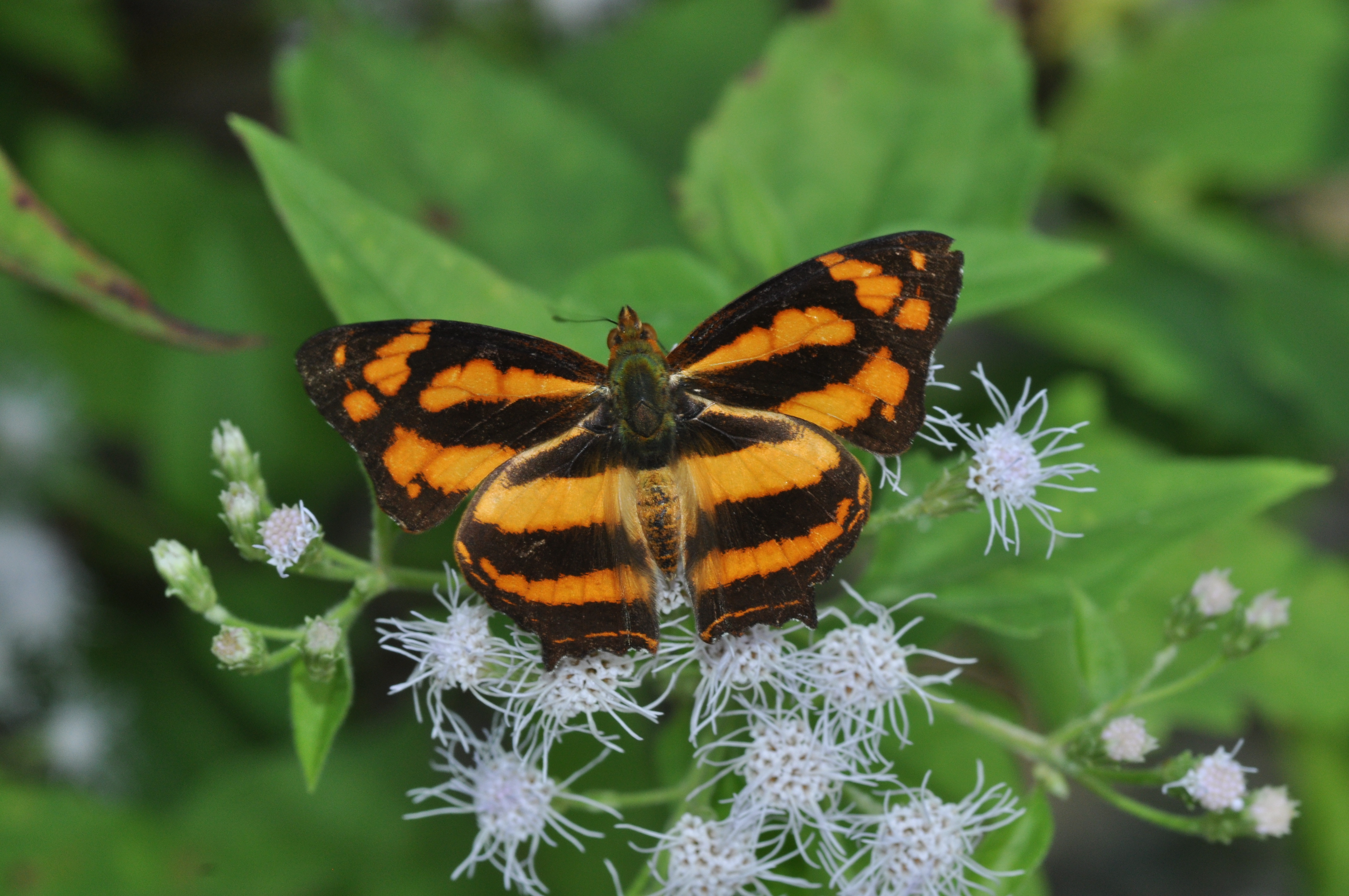
Dorsal view

==== Genus: Vanessa ====
===== Species: Vanessa cardui (painted lady) =====
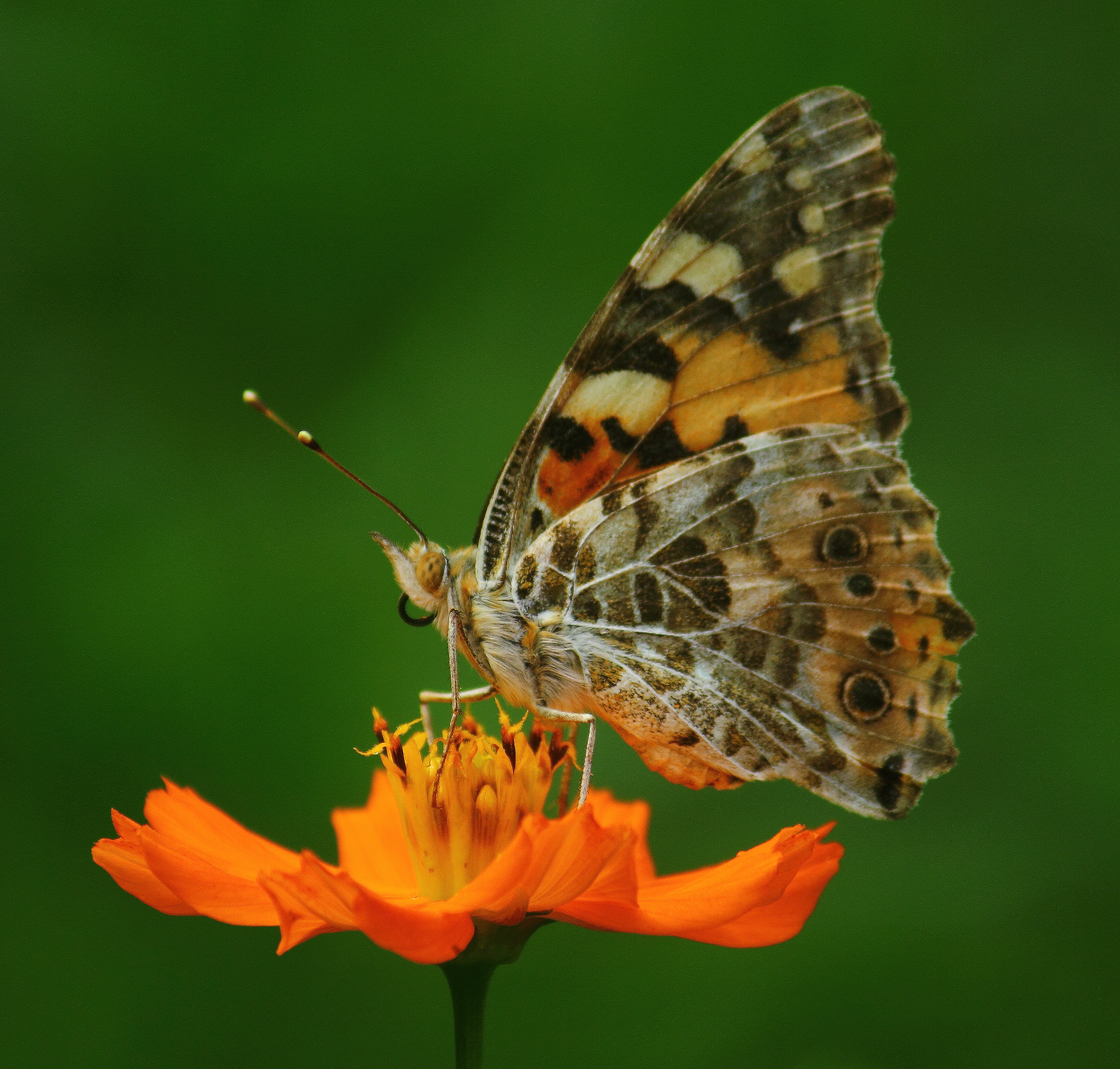
Ventral view

===== Species: Vanessa indica (Indian red admiral) =====
Subspecies: Vanessa indica indica (Himalayan red admiral)

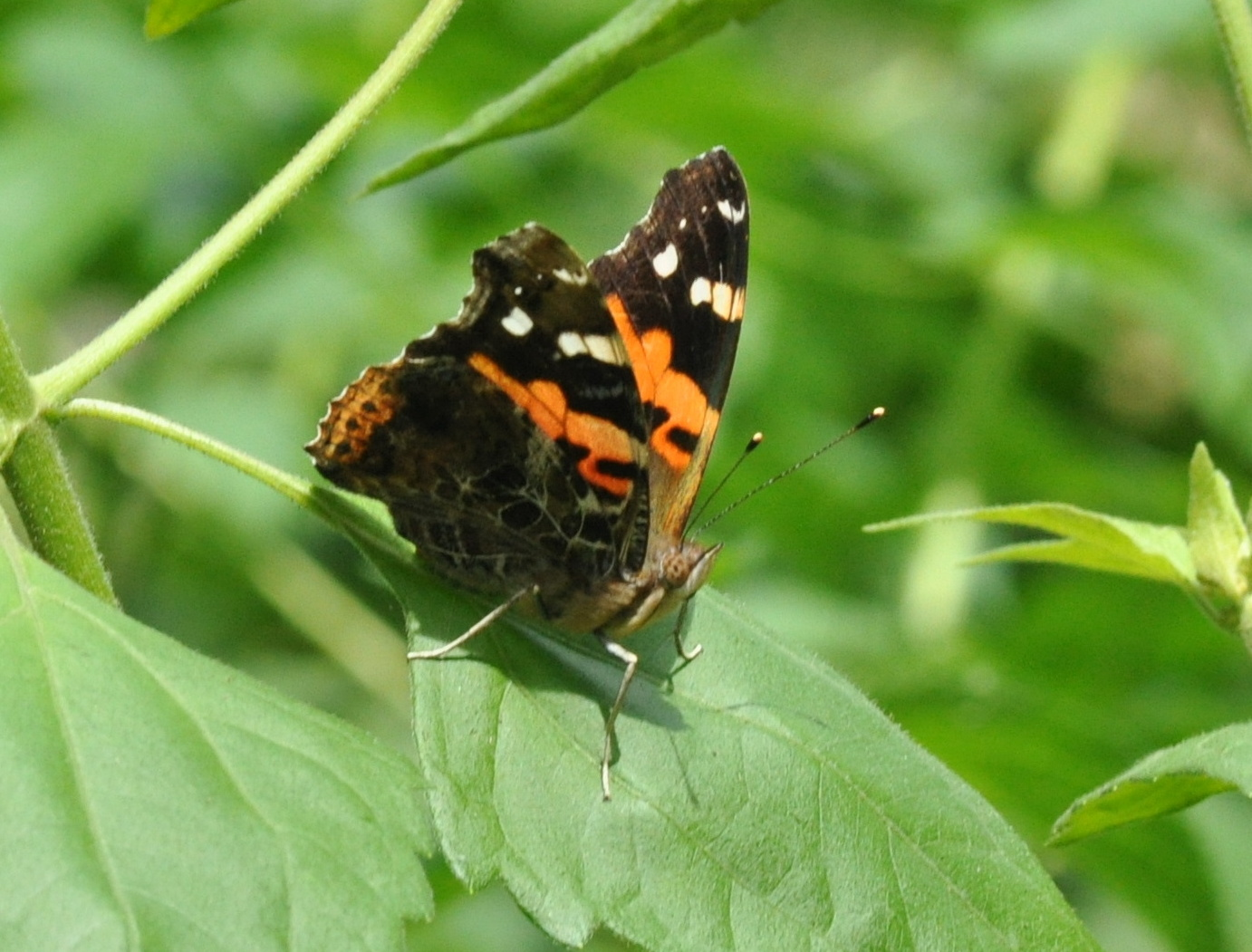
Ventral view

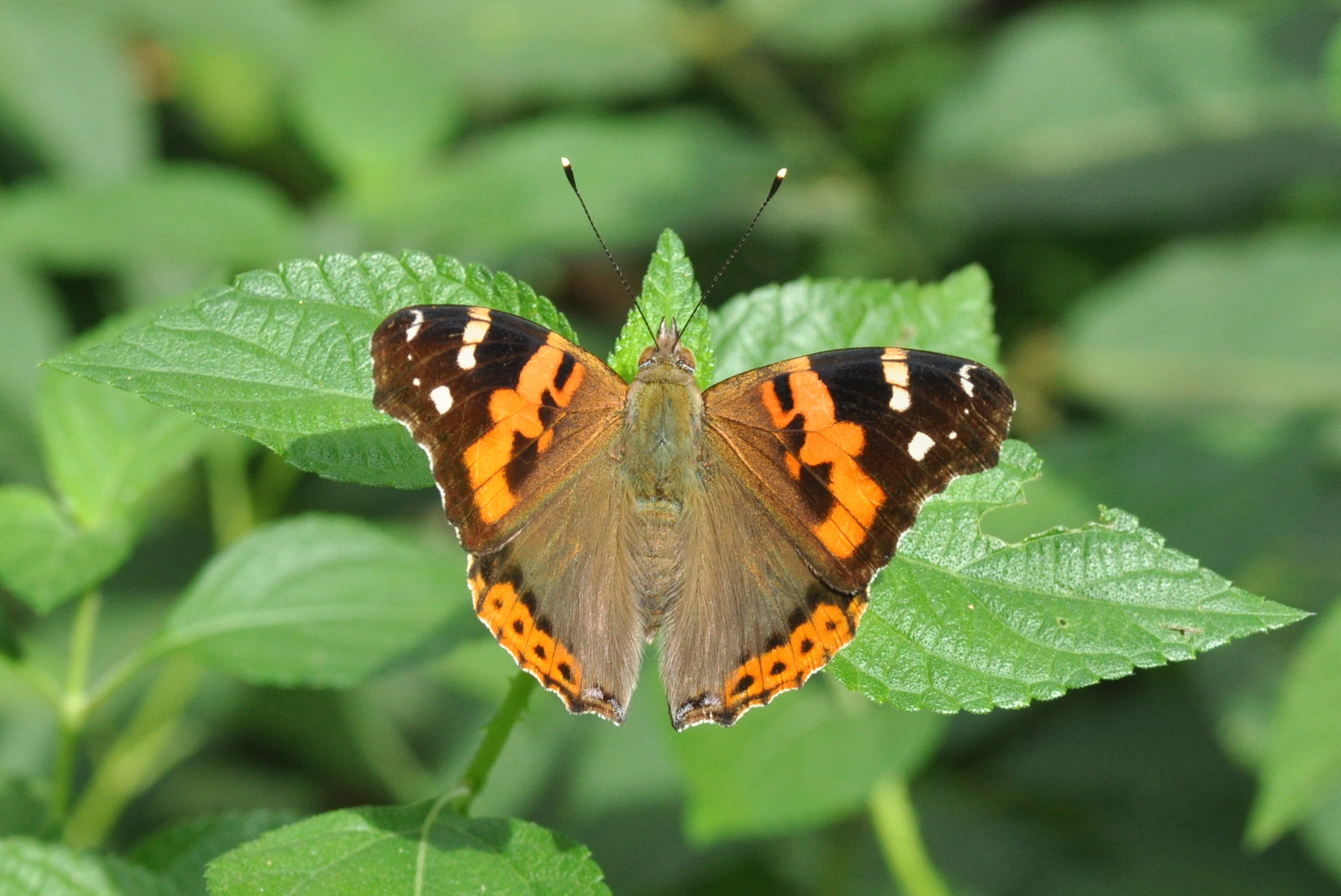
Dorsal view

=== Subfamily: Pseudergolinae ===
Tribe: Pseudergolini

==== Genus: Pseudergolis ====
===== Species: Pseudergolis wedah (tabby) =====
Subspecies: Pseudergolis wedah wedah (Himalayan tabby)

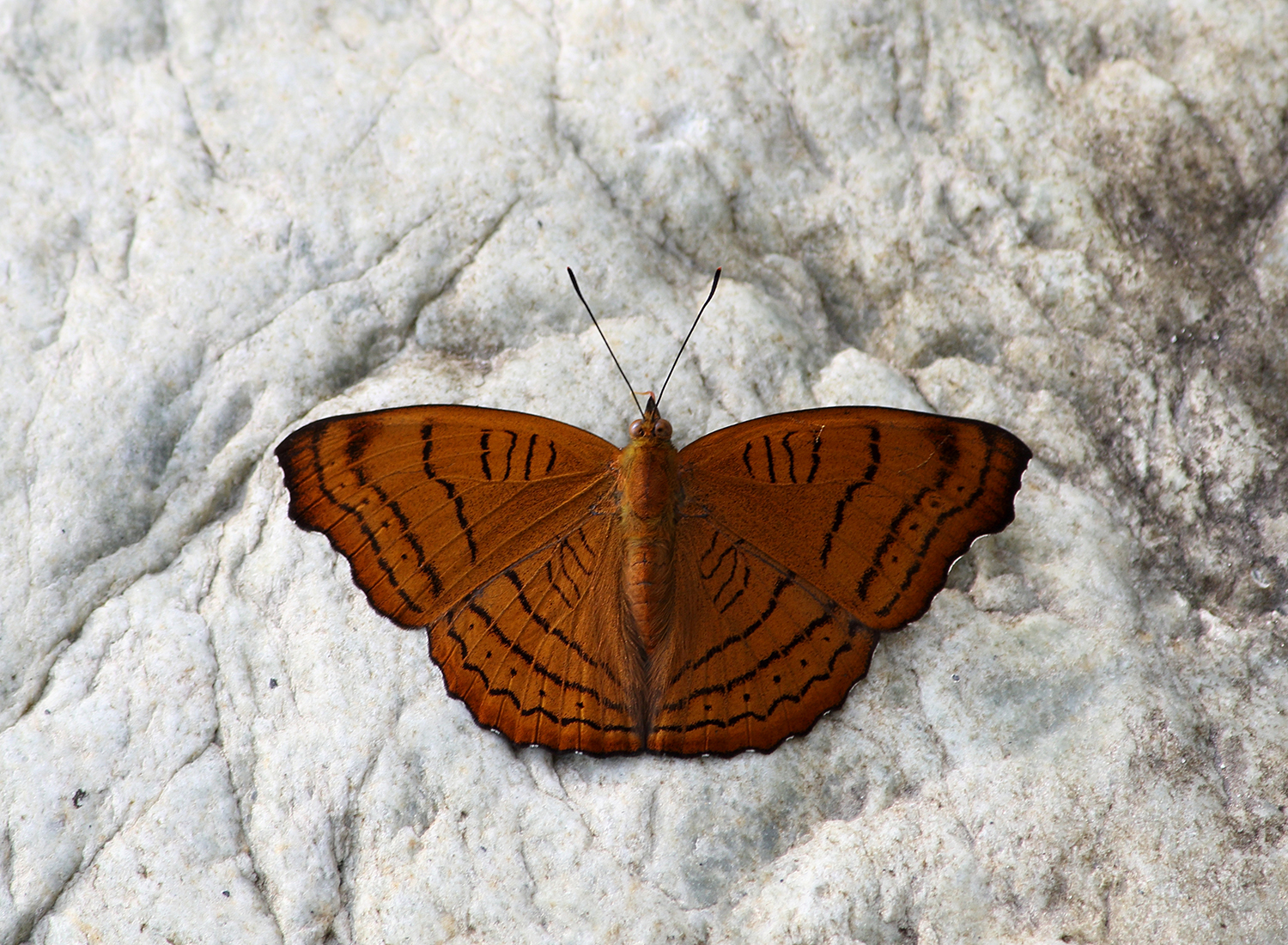
Dorsal view

==== Genus: Stibochiona ====
===== Species: Stibochiona nicea (popinjay) =====
Subspecies: Stibochiona nicea nicea (Himalayan popinjay)

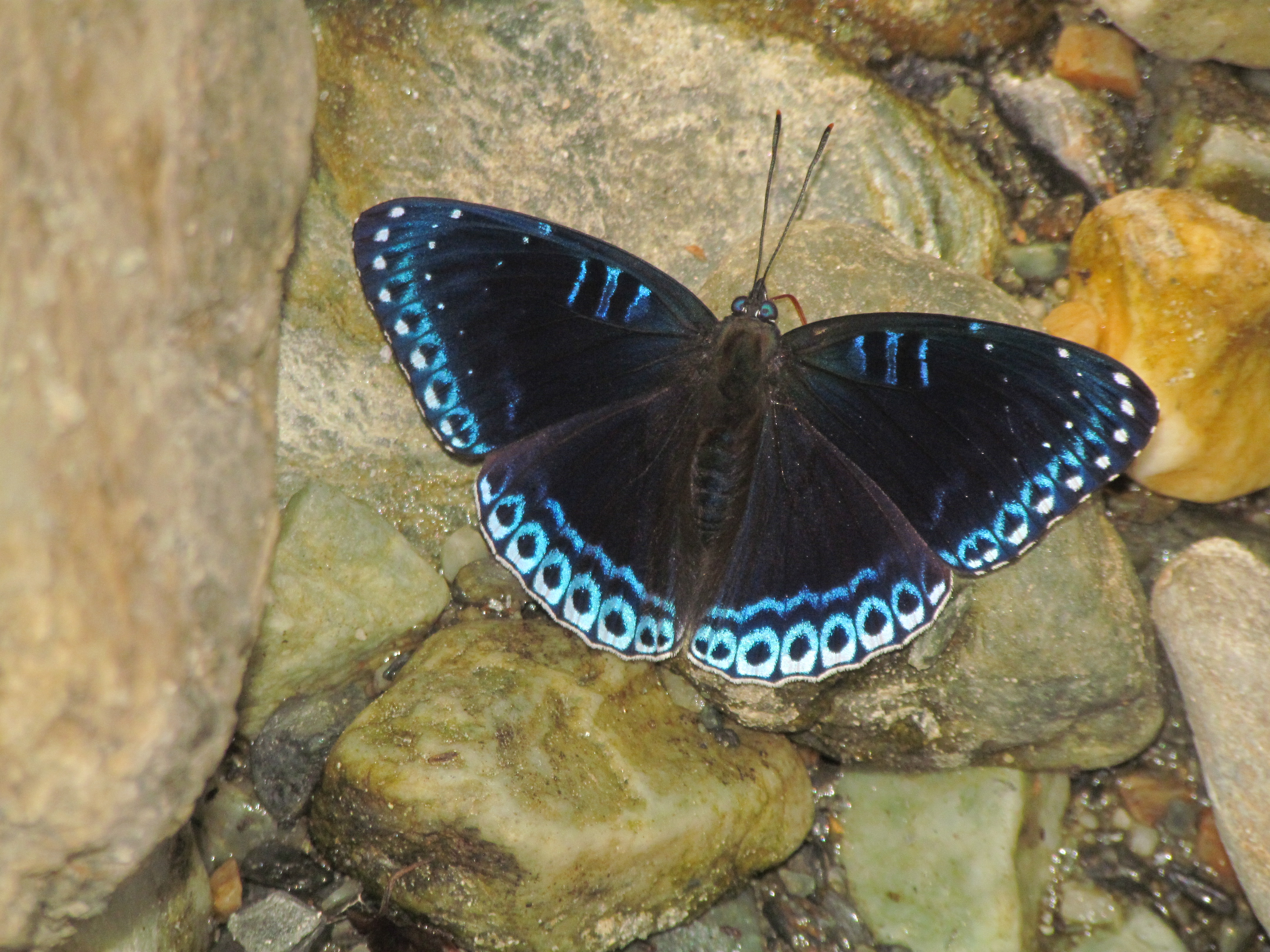
Dorsal view

=== Subfamily: Satyrinae ===
Tribe: Elymniini

==== Genus: Elymnias ====
===== Species: Elymnias hypermnestra (common palmfly) =====
Subspecies: Elymnias hypermnestra undularis (wavy common palmfly)

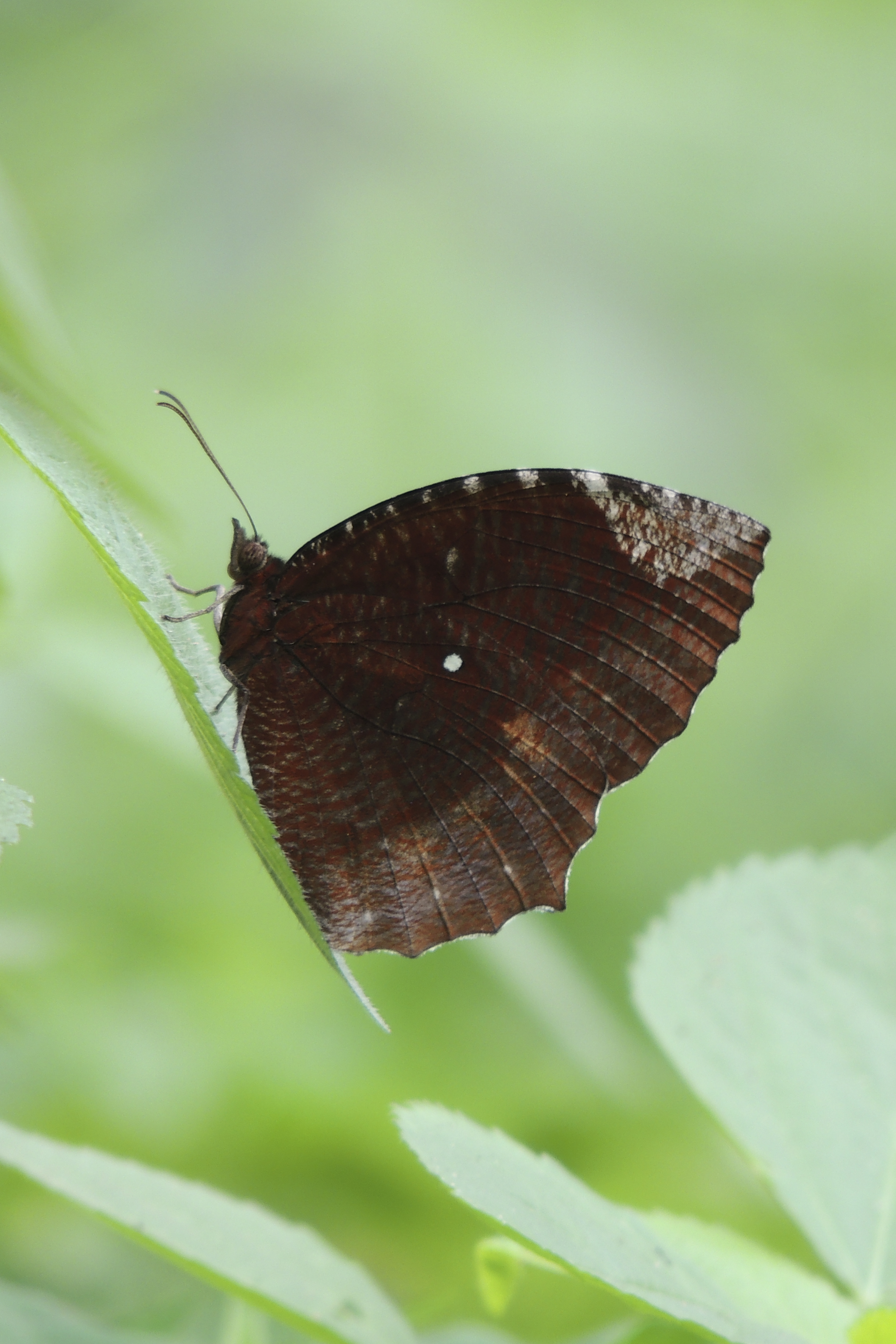
Ventral view

===== Species: Elymnias malelas (spotted palmfly) =====
Subspecies: Elymnias malelas malelas (Bengal spotted palmfly)

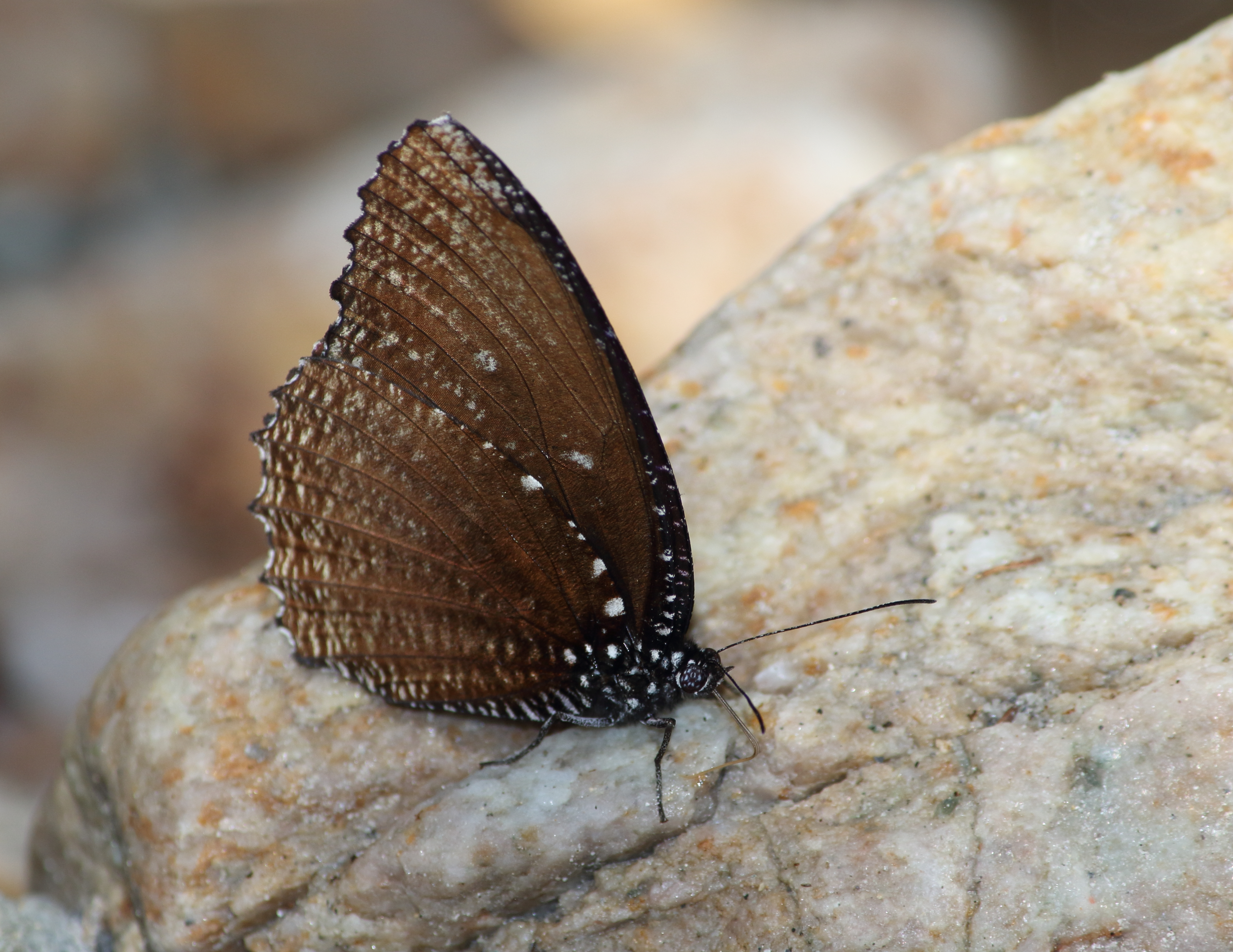
Ventral view

===== Species: Elymnias vasudeva (Jezebel palmfly) =====
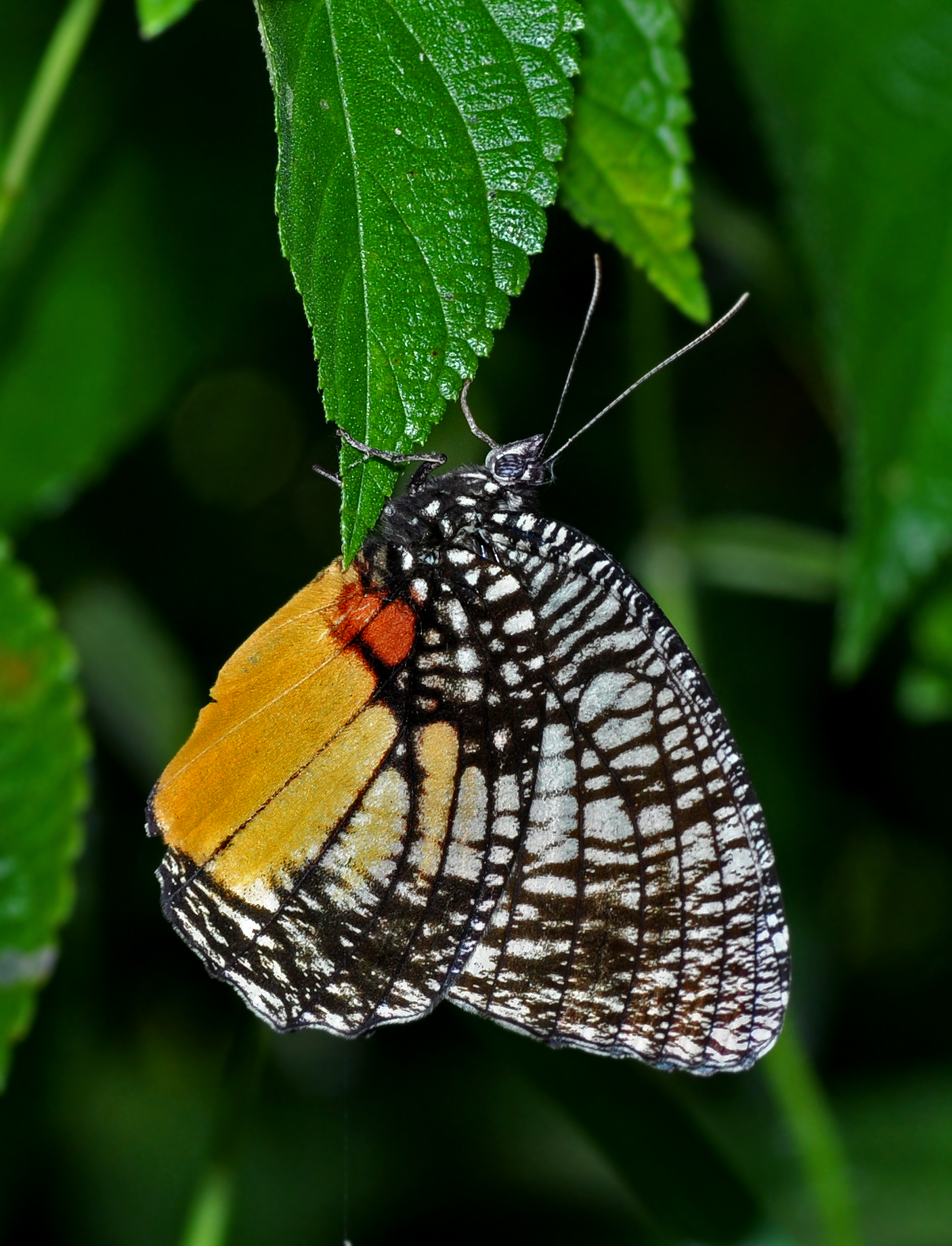
Ventral view

Tribe: Melanitini

==== Genus: Melanitis ====
===== Species: Melanitis leda (common evening brown) =====
Subspecies: Melanitis leda leda (Oriental common evening brown)

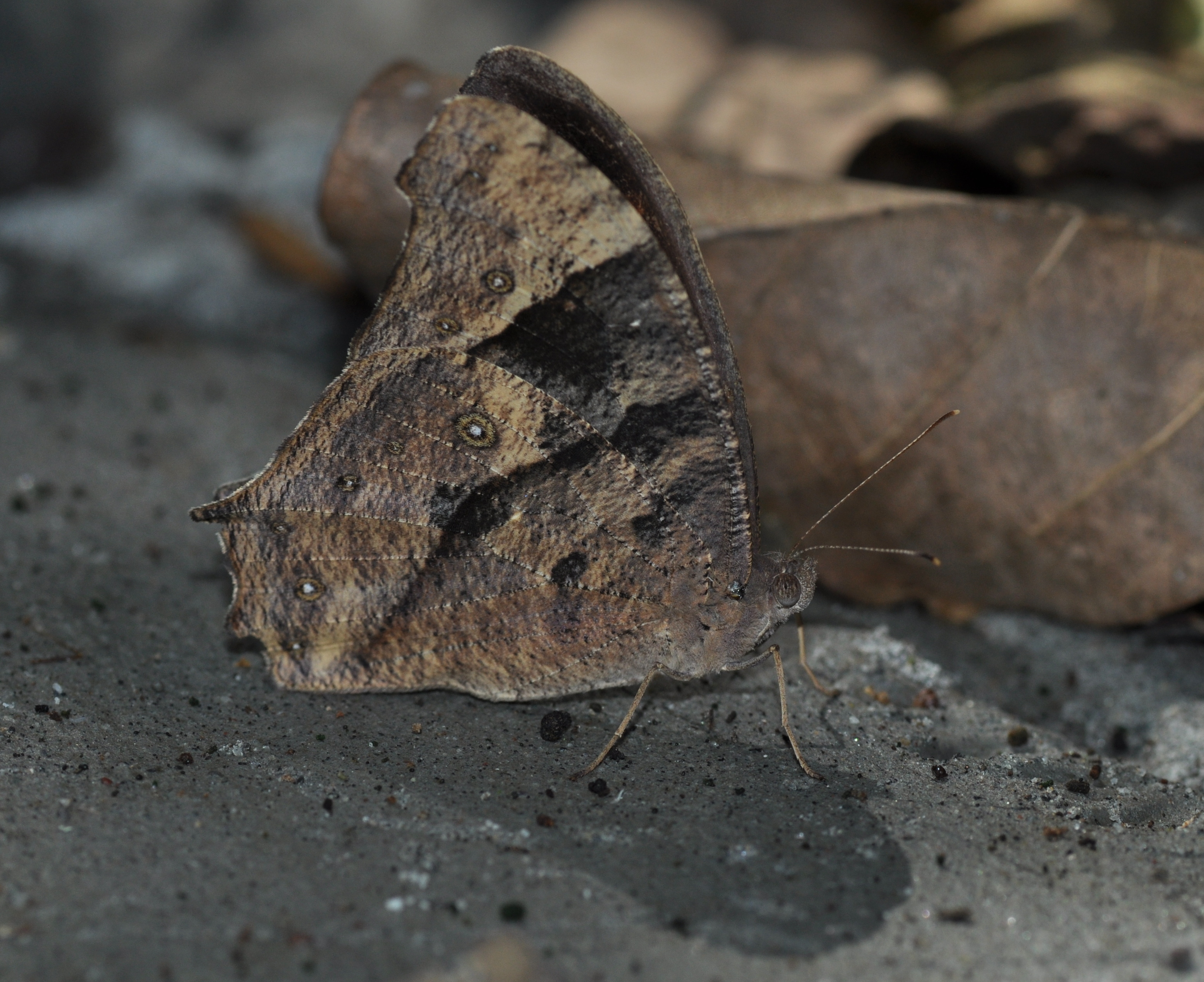
Ventral view (dry-season form)

Tribe: Satyrini

==== Genus: Lethe ====
===== Species: Lethe chandica (angled red forester) =====
Subspecies: Lethe chandica chandica (Darjeeling angled red forester)

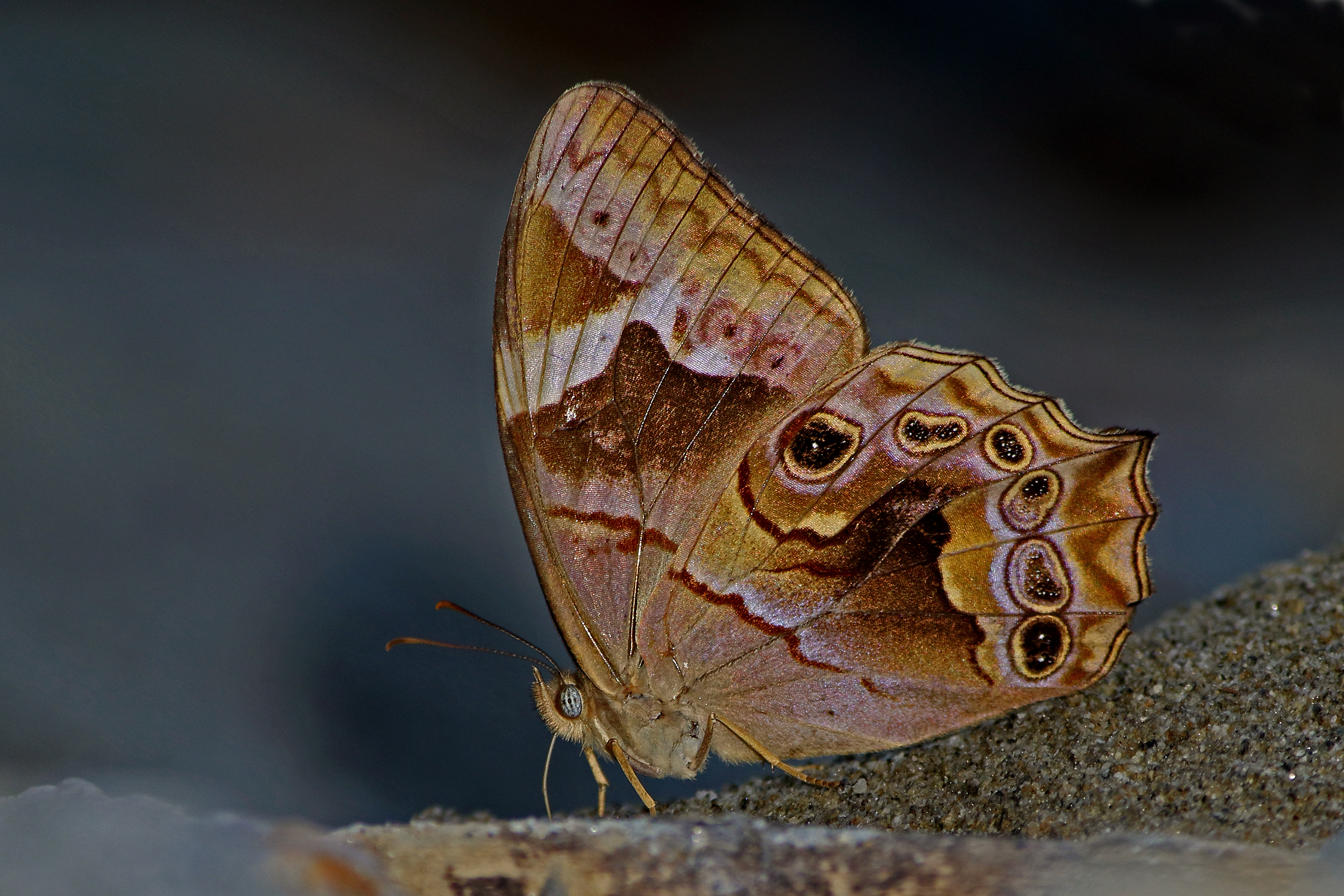
Ventral view (female)

===== Species: Lethe confusa (banded treebrown) =====
Subspecies: Lethe confusa confusa (Himalayan banded treebrown)

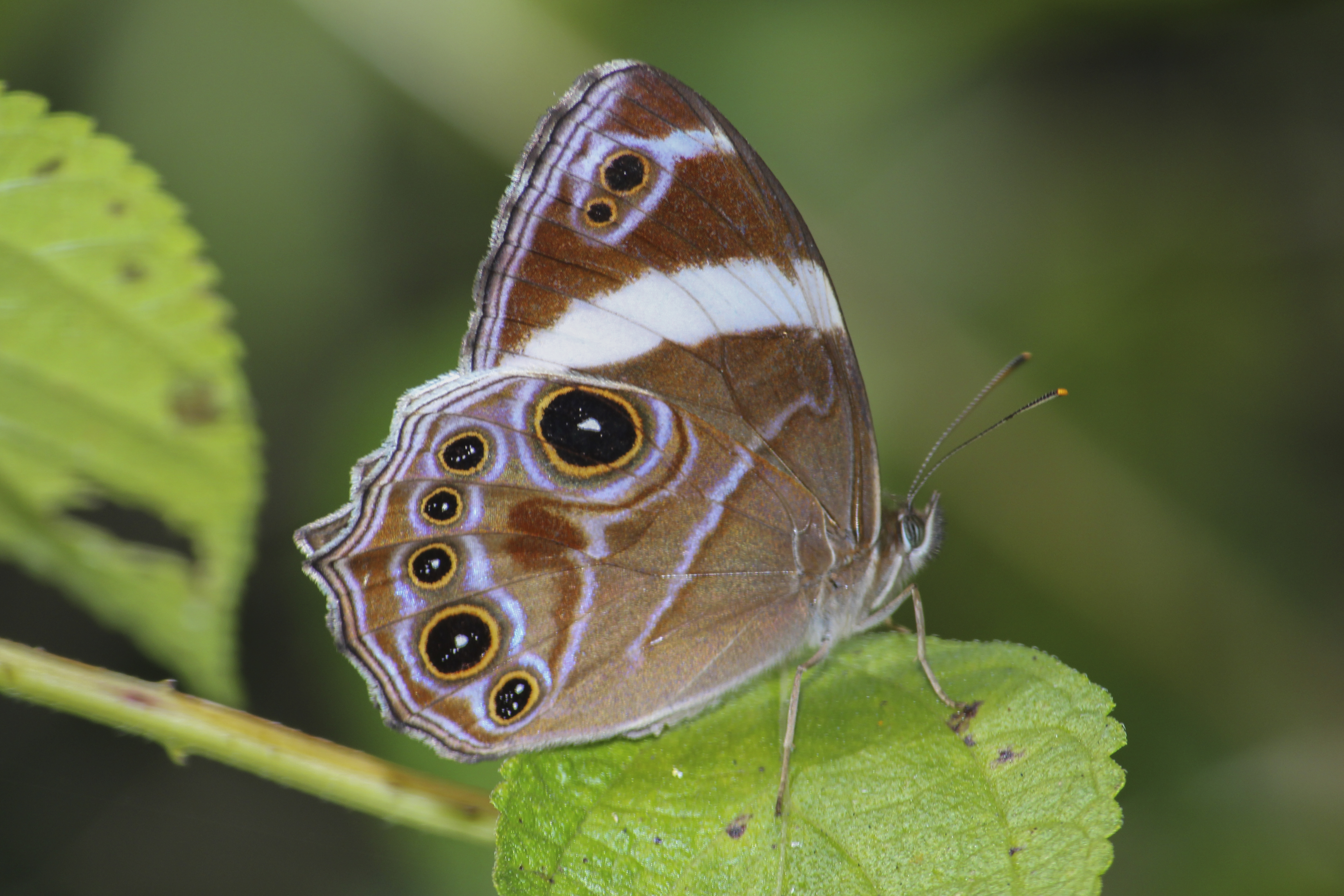
Ventral view

==== Genus: Mycalesis ====
===== Species: Mycalesis anaxias (white-bar bushbrown) =====
Subspecies: Mycalesis anaxias aemate (Indo-Chinese white-bar bushbrown)

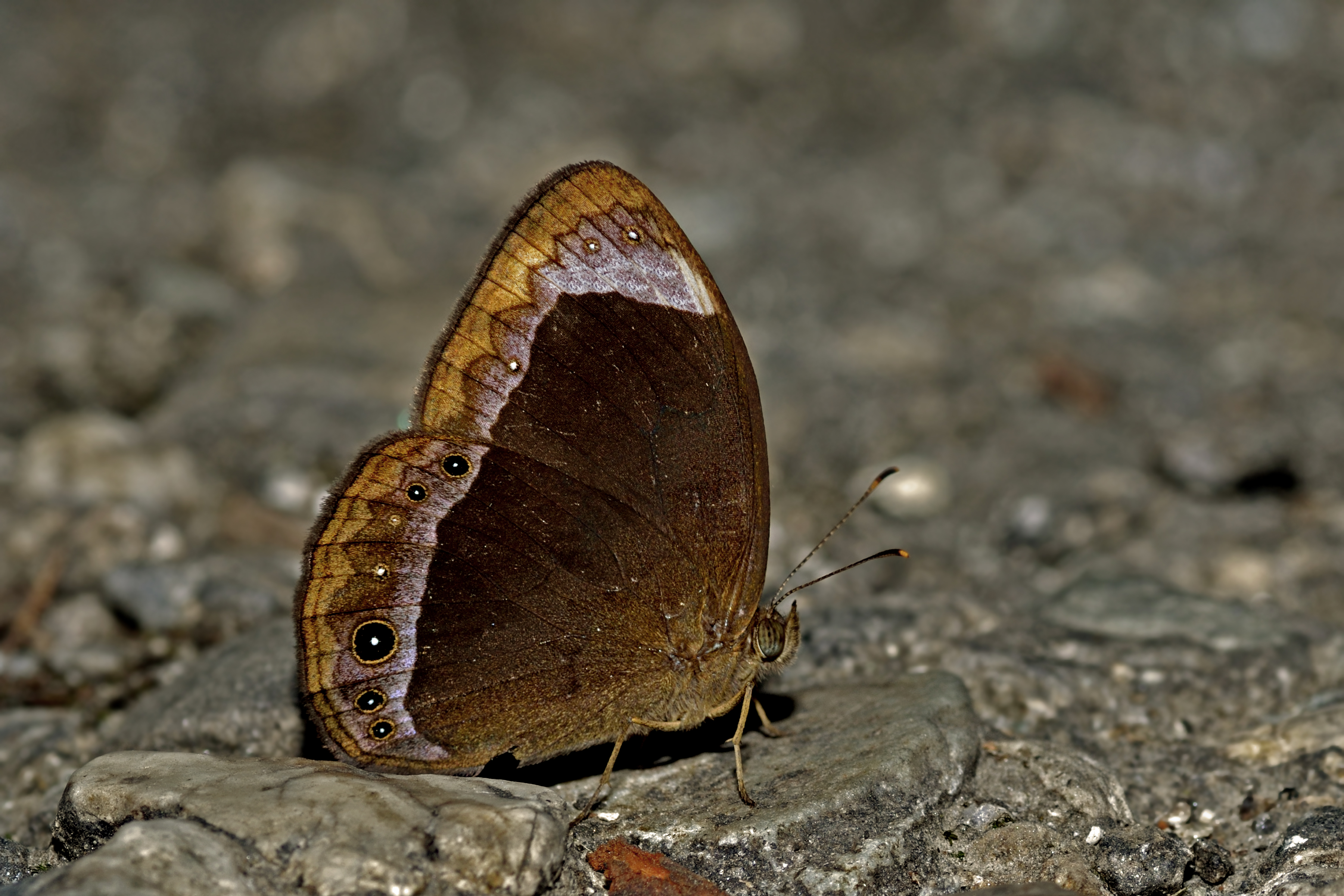
Ventral view

===== Species: Mycalesis malsara (white-line bushbrown) =====
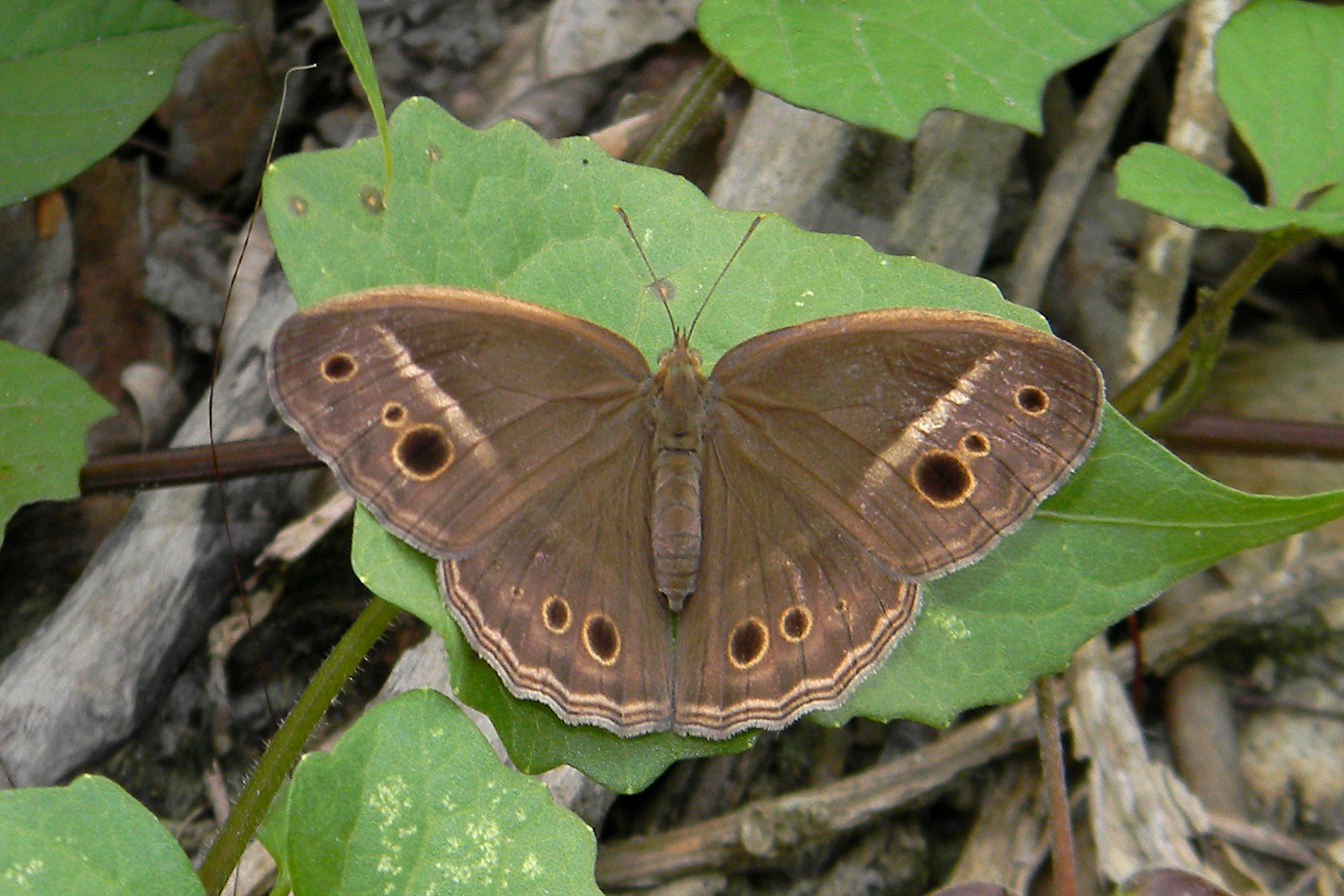
Dorsal view (female)

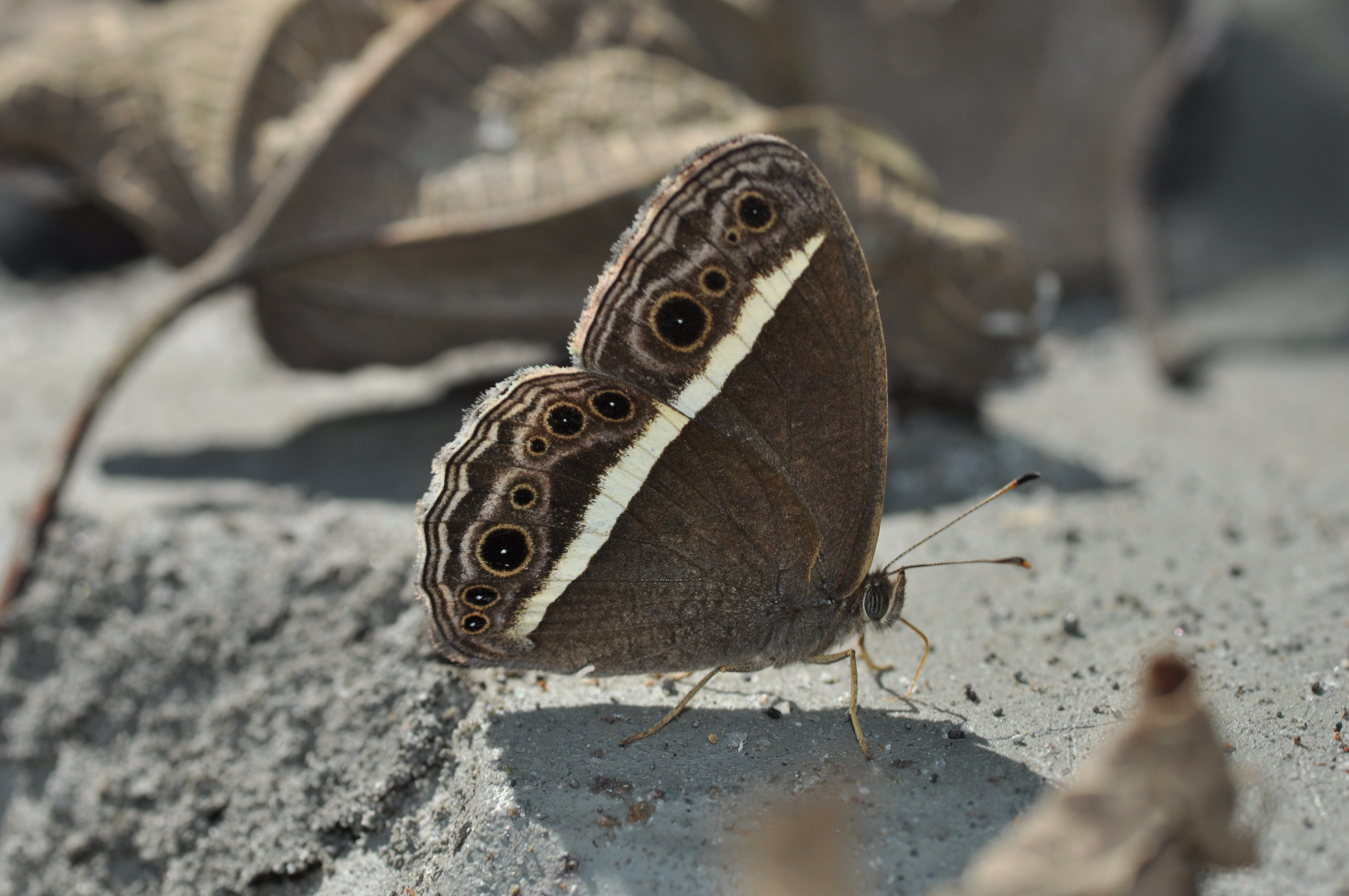
Ventral view

==== Genus: Ypthima ====
===== Species: Ypthima baldus (common five-ring) =====
Subspecies: Ypthima baldus baldus (Himalayan common five-ring)

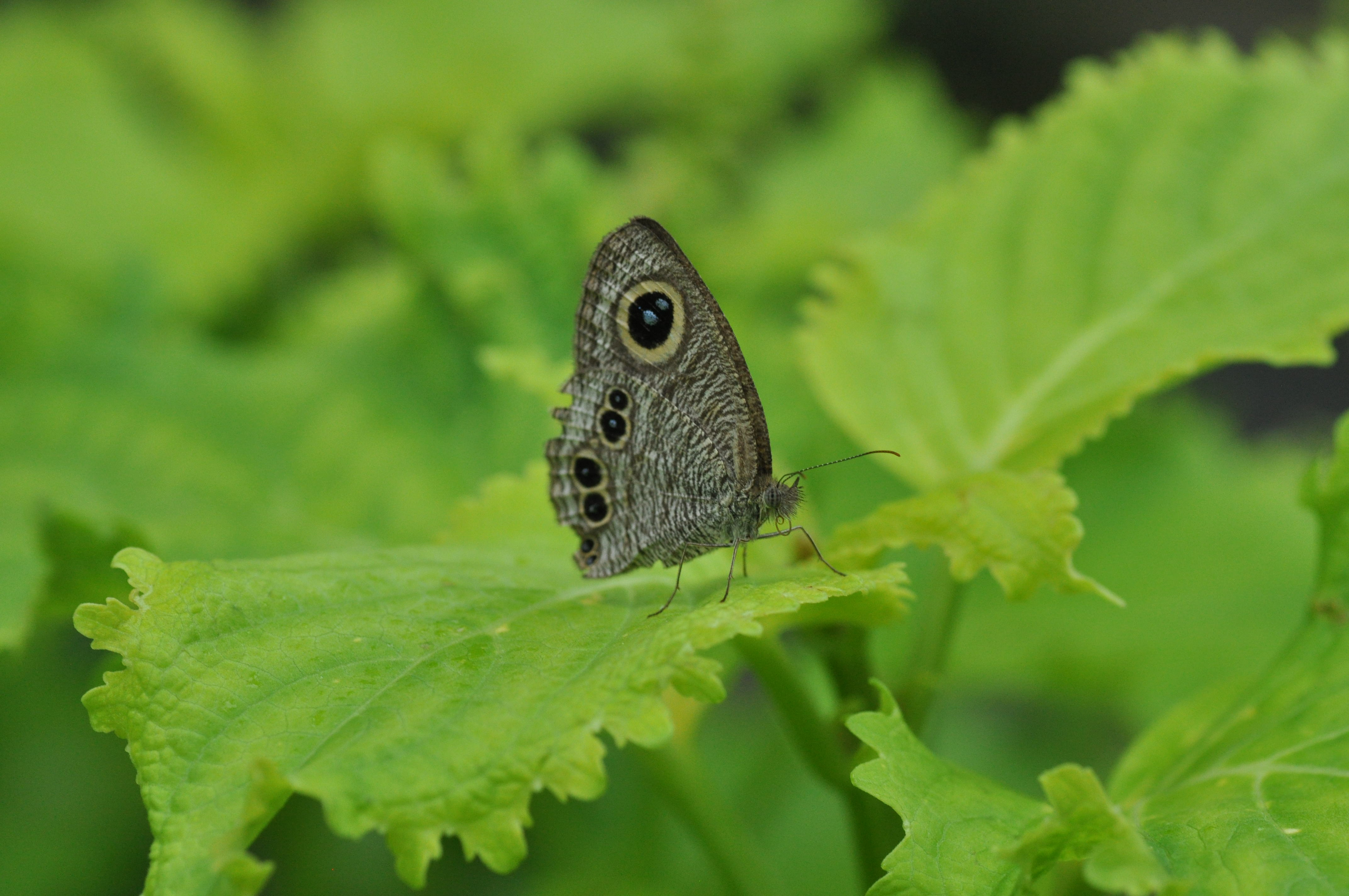
Ventral view

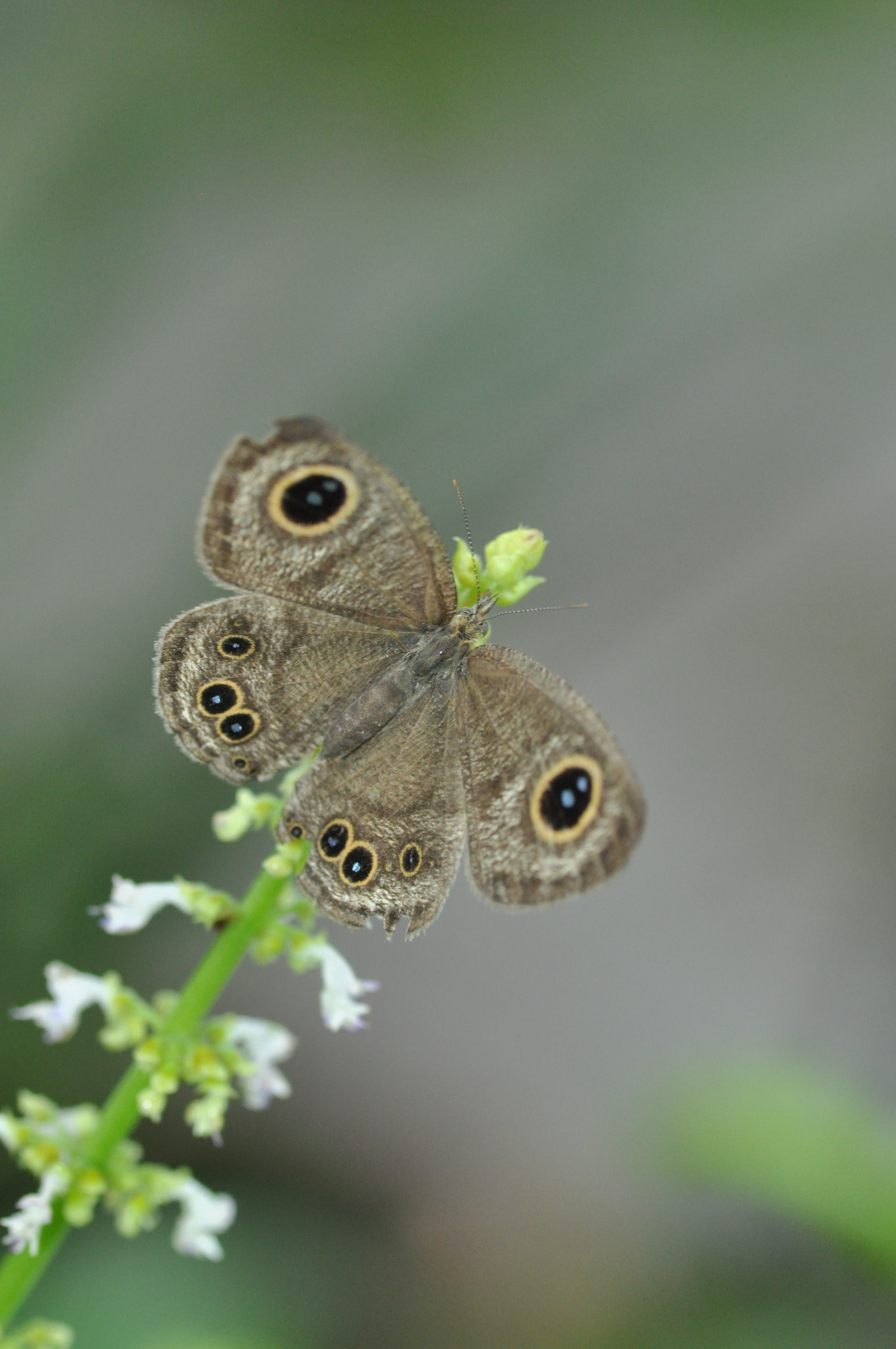
Dorsal view

===== Species: Ypthima huebneri (common four-ring) =====
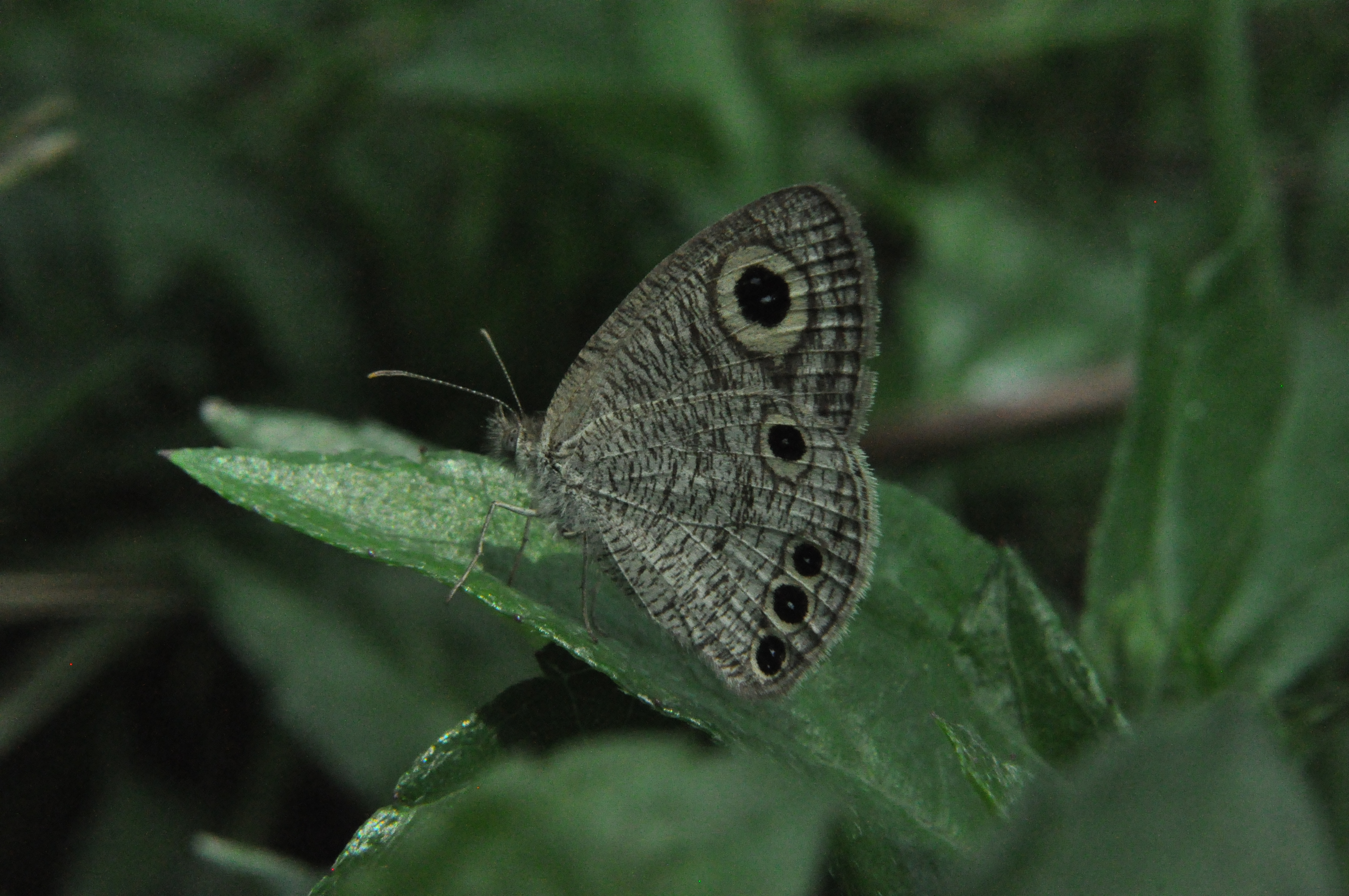
Ventral view

== Family: Lycaenidae ==
=== Subfamily: Curetinae ===
==== Genus: Curetis ====
===== Species: Curetis acuta (acute sunbeam) =====
Subspecies: Curetis acuta dentata (Indian acute sunbeam)

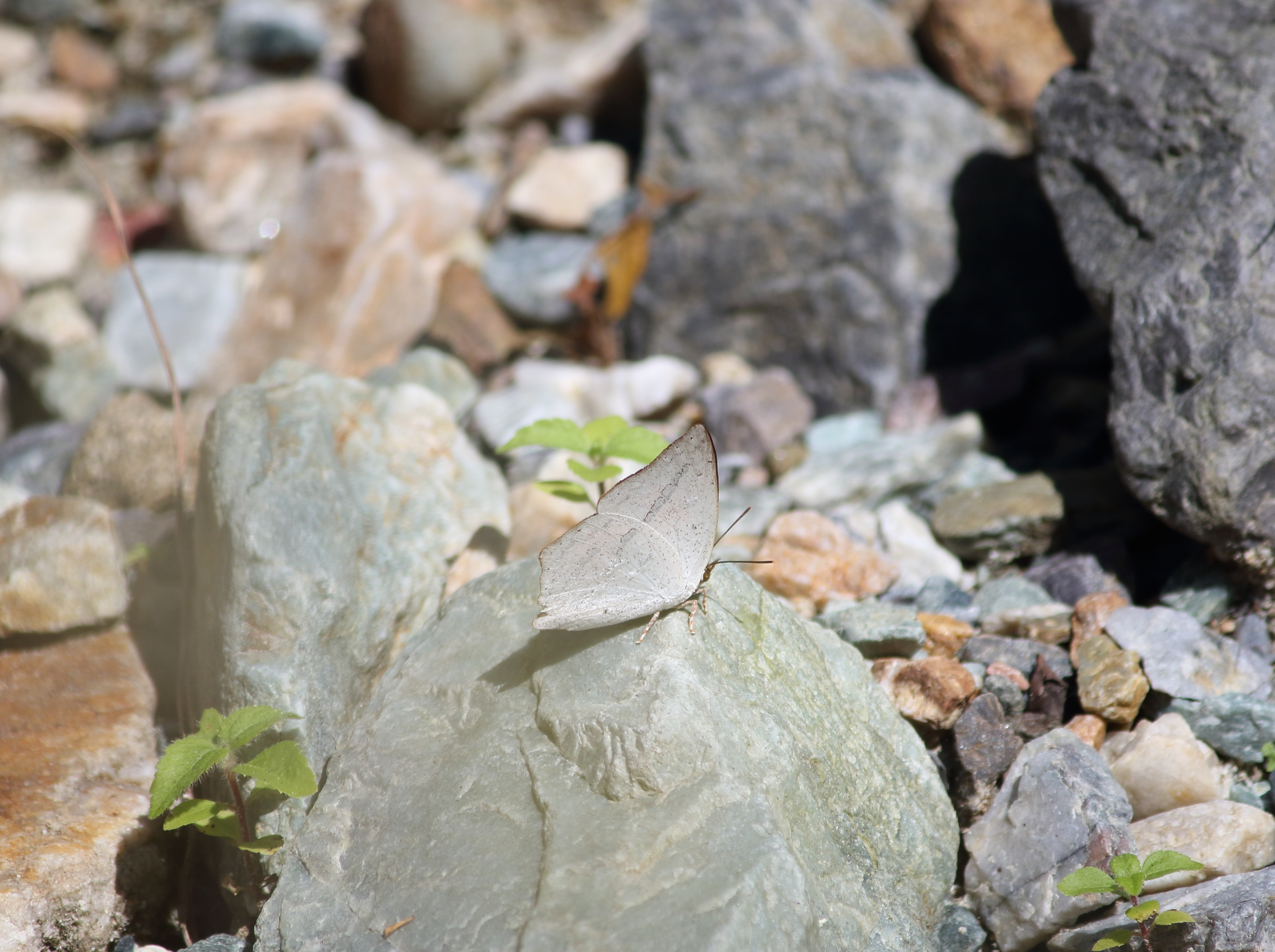
Ventral view (female)

===== Species: Curetis bulis (bright sunbeam) =====
Subspecies: Curetis bulis bulis (Himalayan bright sunbeam)

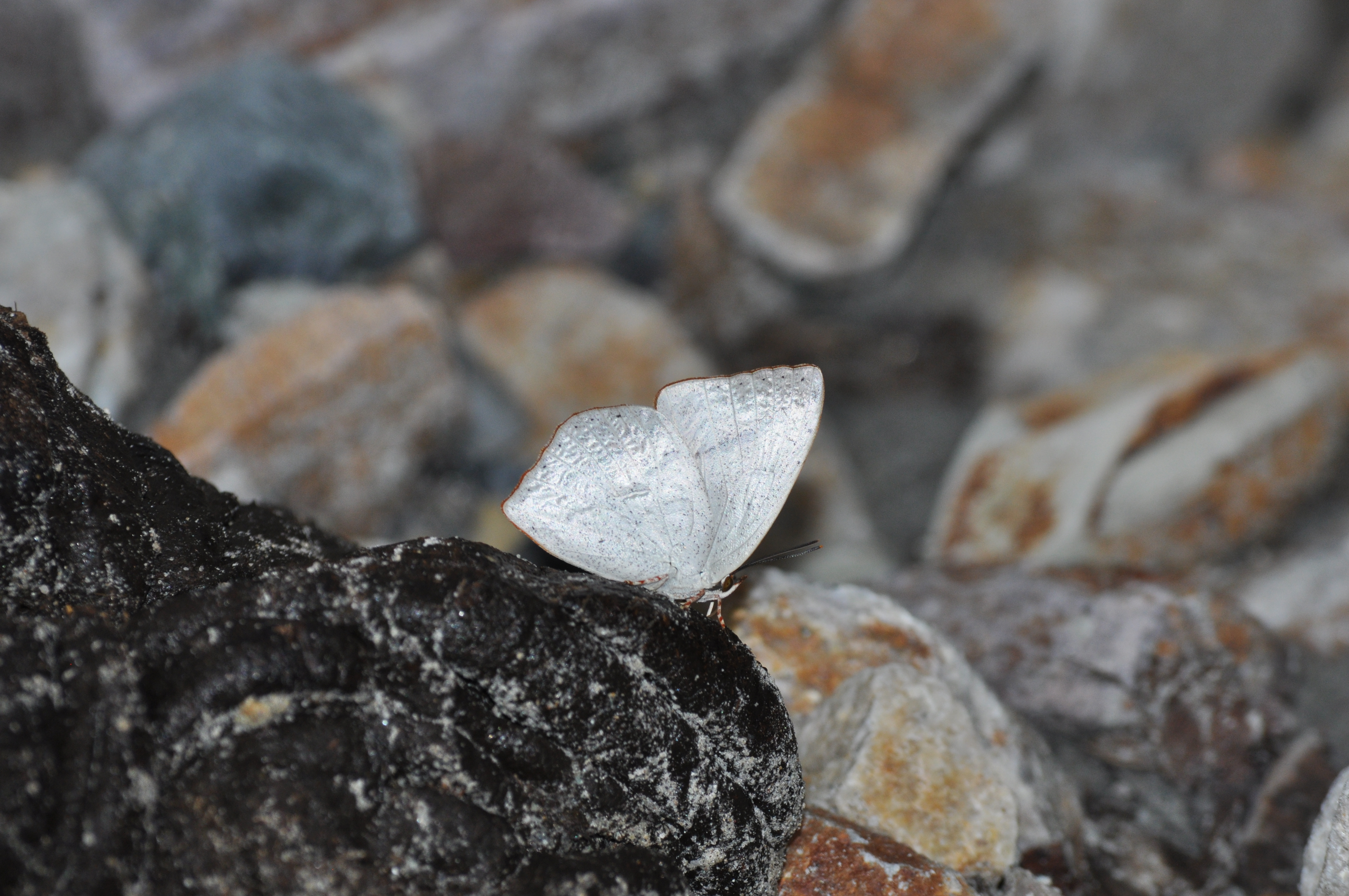
Ventral view

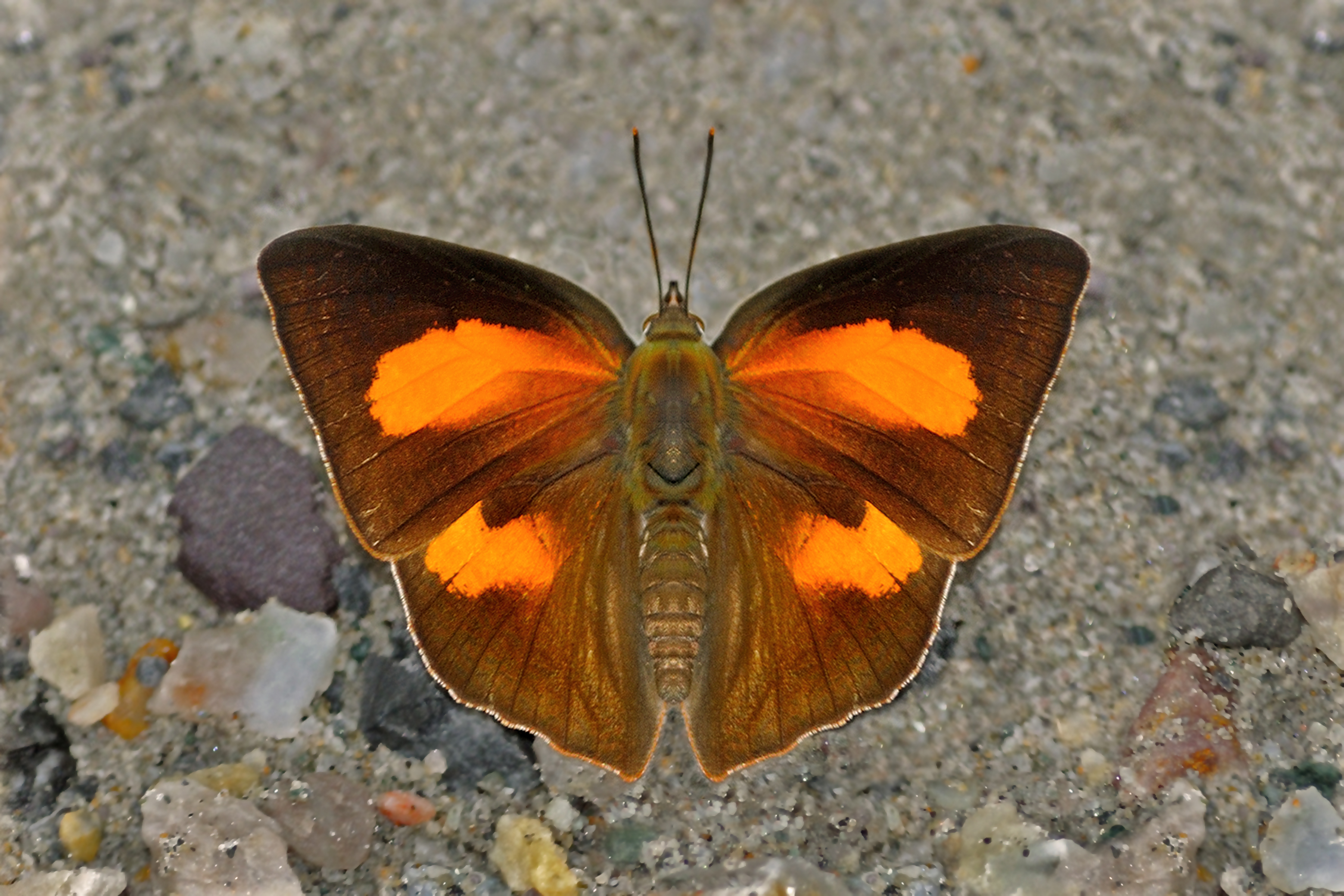
Dorsal view (male)

===== Species: Curetis thetis (Indian sunbeam) =====
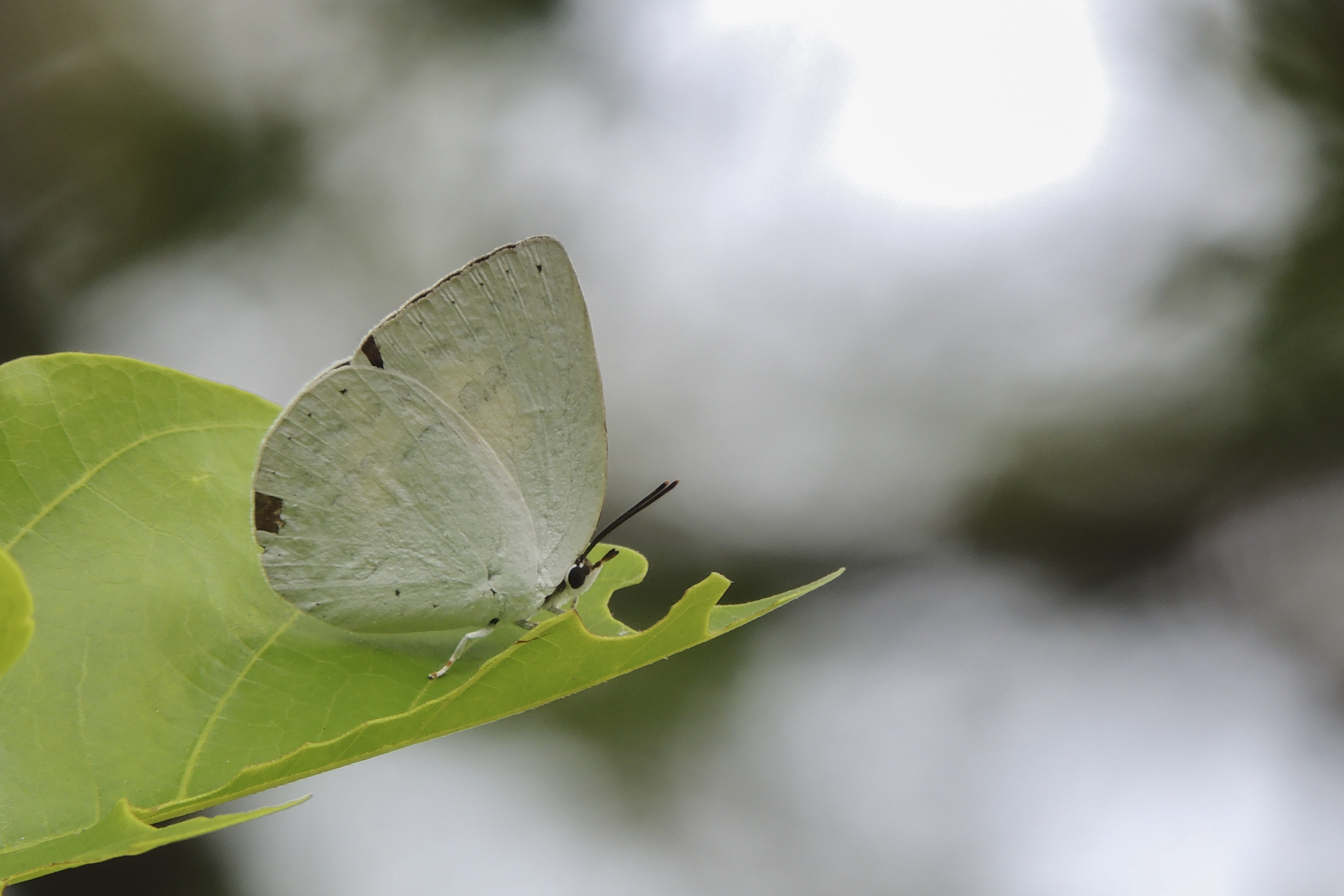
Ventral view (female)

=== Subfamily: Lycaeninae ===
==== Genus: Heliophorus ====
===== Species: Heliophorus brahma (golden sapphire) =====
Subspecies: Heliophorus brahma brahma (Himalayan golden sapphire)

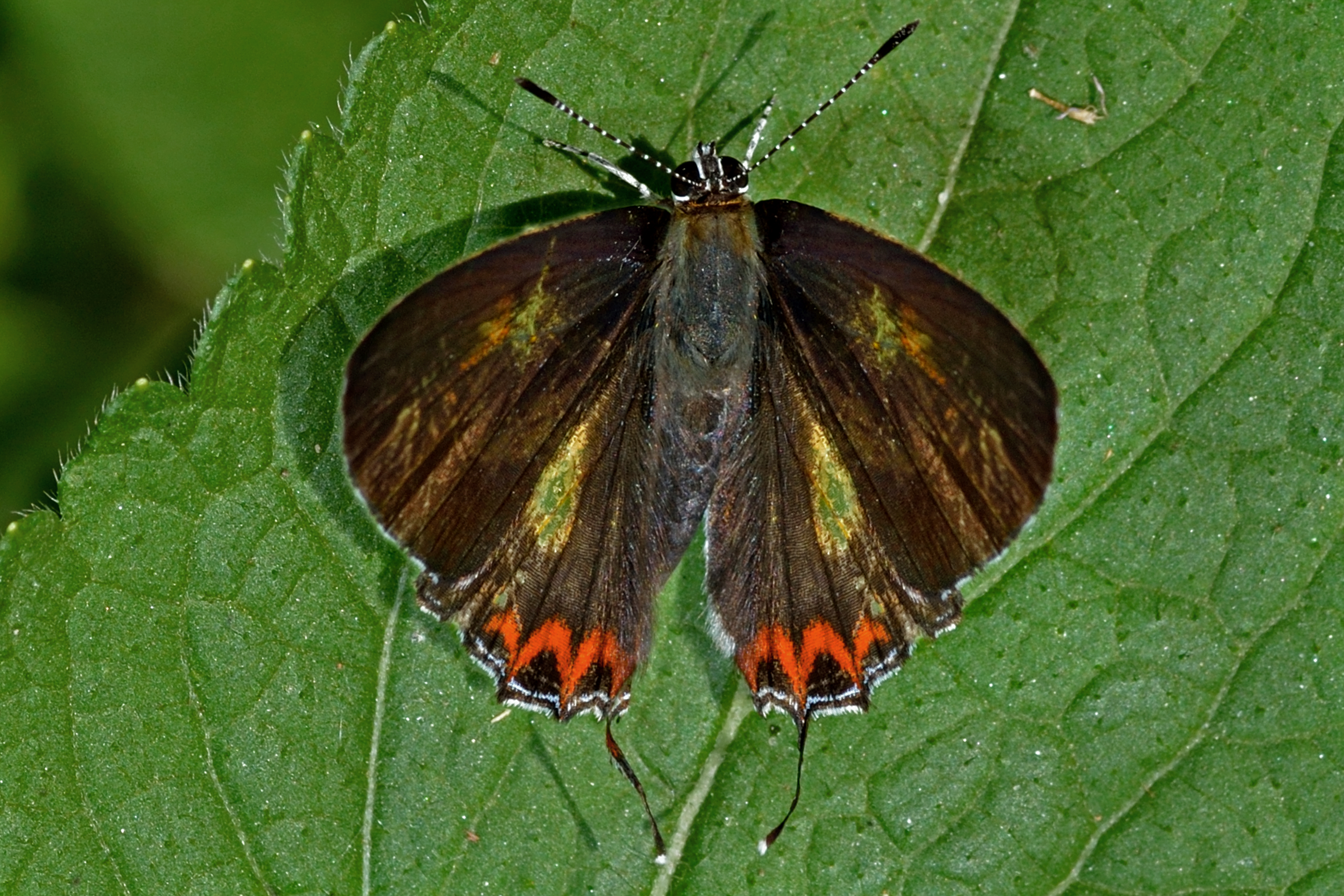
Dorsal view (male)

=== Subfamily: Polyommatinae ===
Tribe: Lycaenesthini

==== Genus: Anthene ====
===== Species: Anthene emolus (common ciliate blue) =====
Subspecies: Anthene emolus emolus (Bengal common ciliate blue)

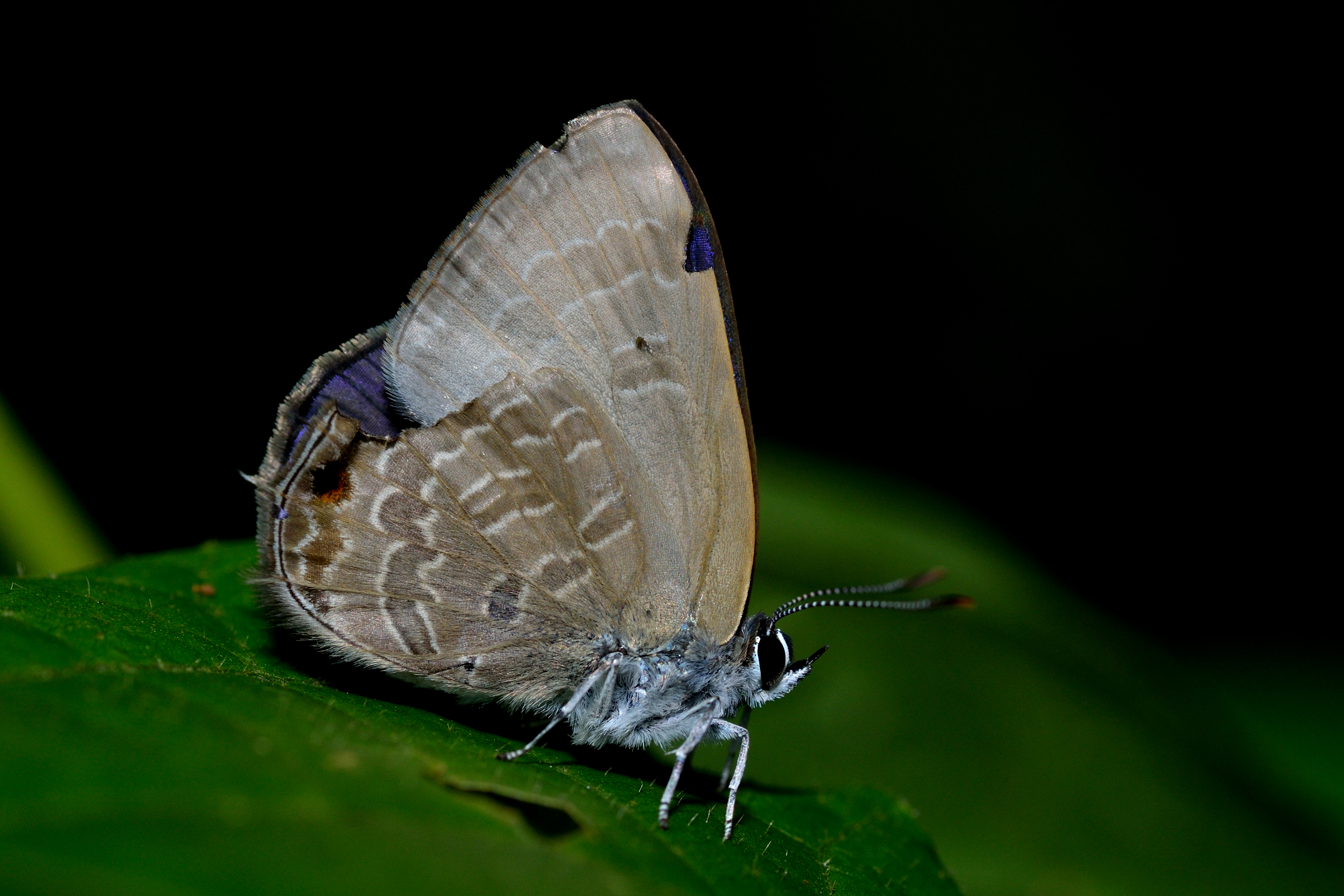
Ventral view

Tribe: Polyommatini

==== Genus: Acytolepis ====
===== Species: Acytolepis puspa (common hedge blue) =====
Subspecies: Acytolepis puspa gisca (Himalayan common hedge blue)

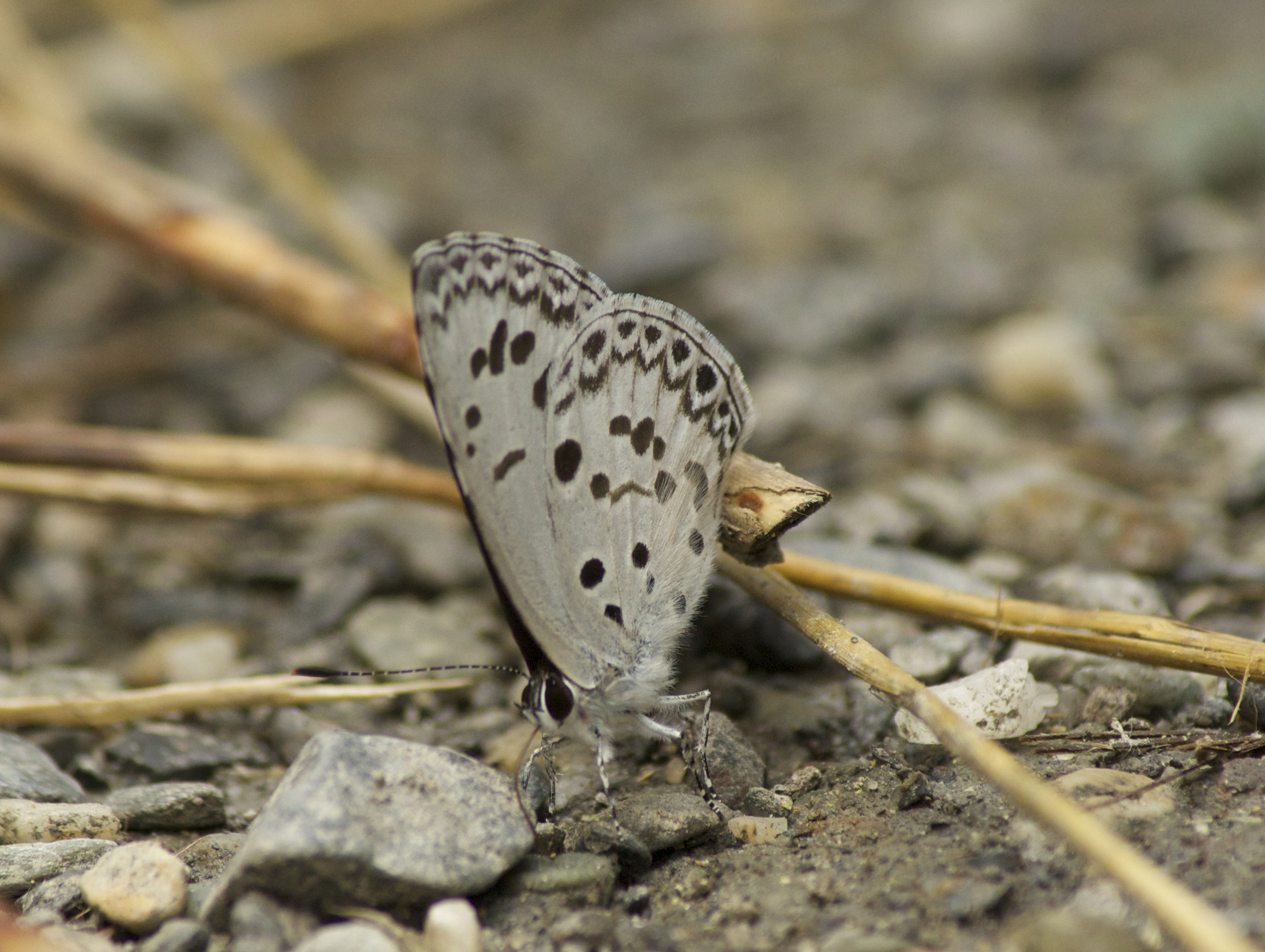
Ventral view

==== Genus: Caleta ====
===== Species: Caleta elna (elbowed Pierrot) =====
Subspecies: Caleta elna noliteia (Indo-Chinese elbowed Pierrot)

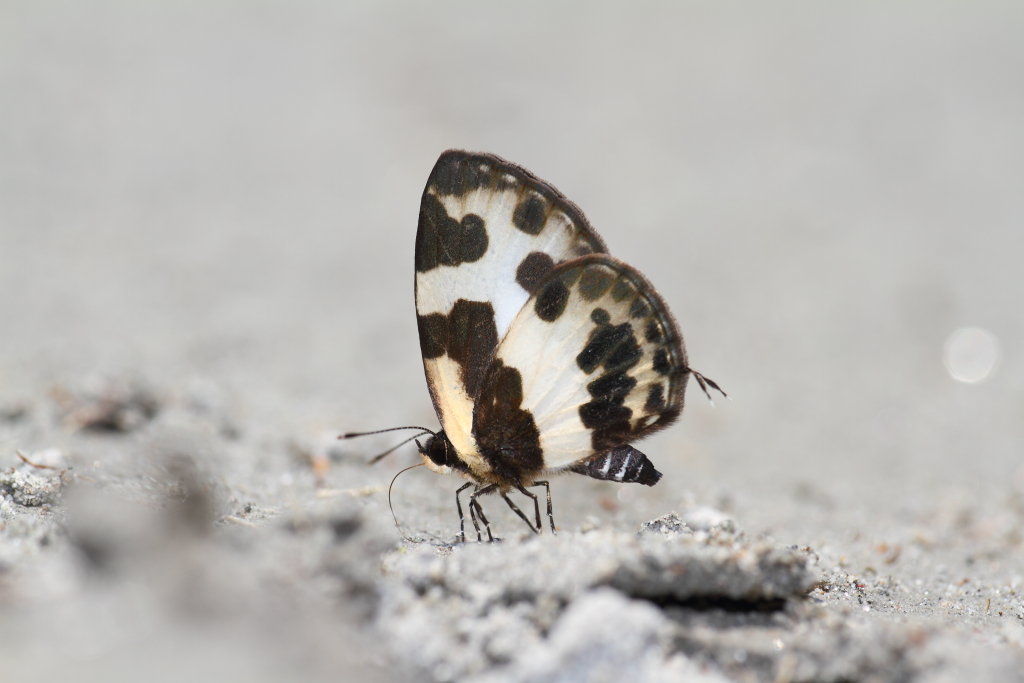
Ventral view

==== Genus: Castalius ====
===== Species: Castalius rosimon (common Pierrot) =====
Subspecies: Castalius rosimon rosimon (Continental common Pierrot)

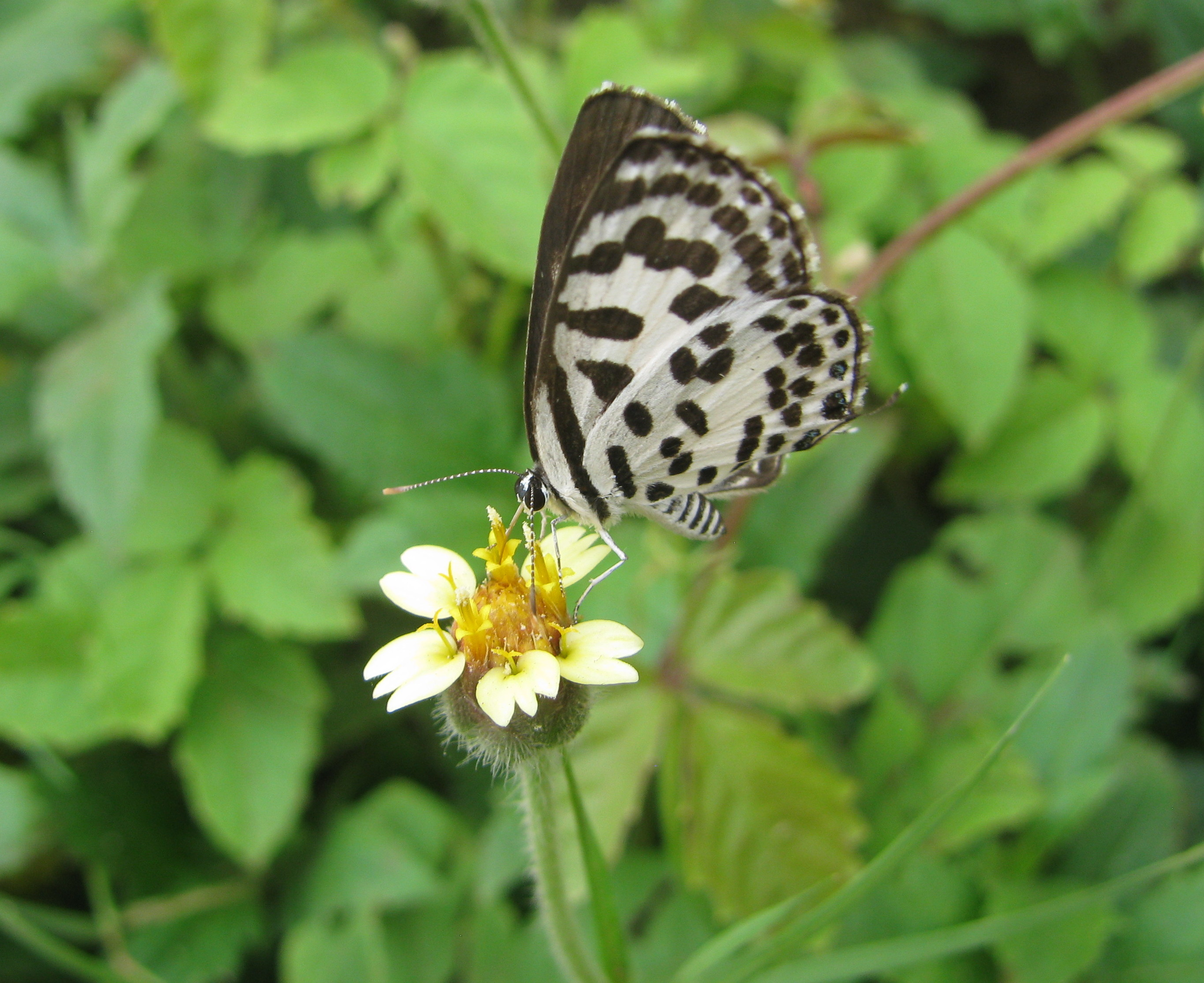
Ventral view

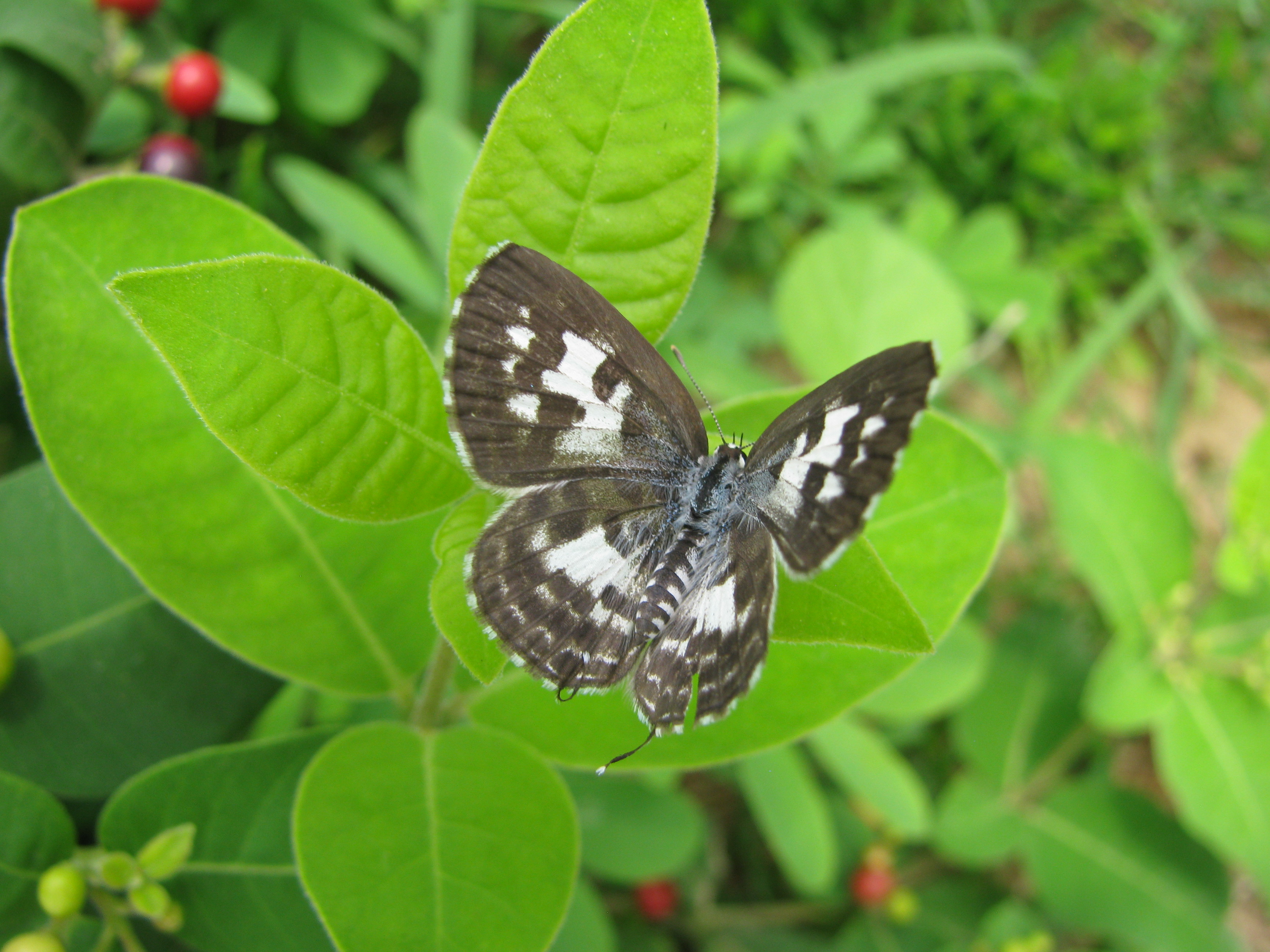
Dorsal view

==== Genus: Catochrysops ====
===== Species: Catochrysops panormus (silver forget-me-not) =====
Subspecies: Catochrysops panormus exiguus (Malay silver forget-me-not)

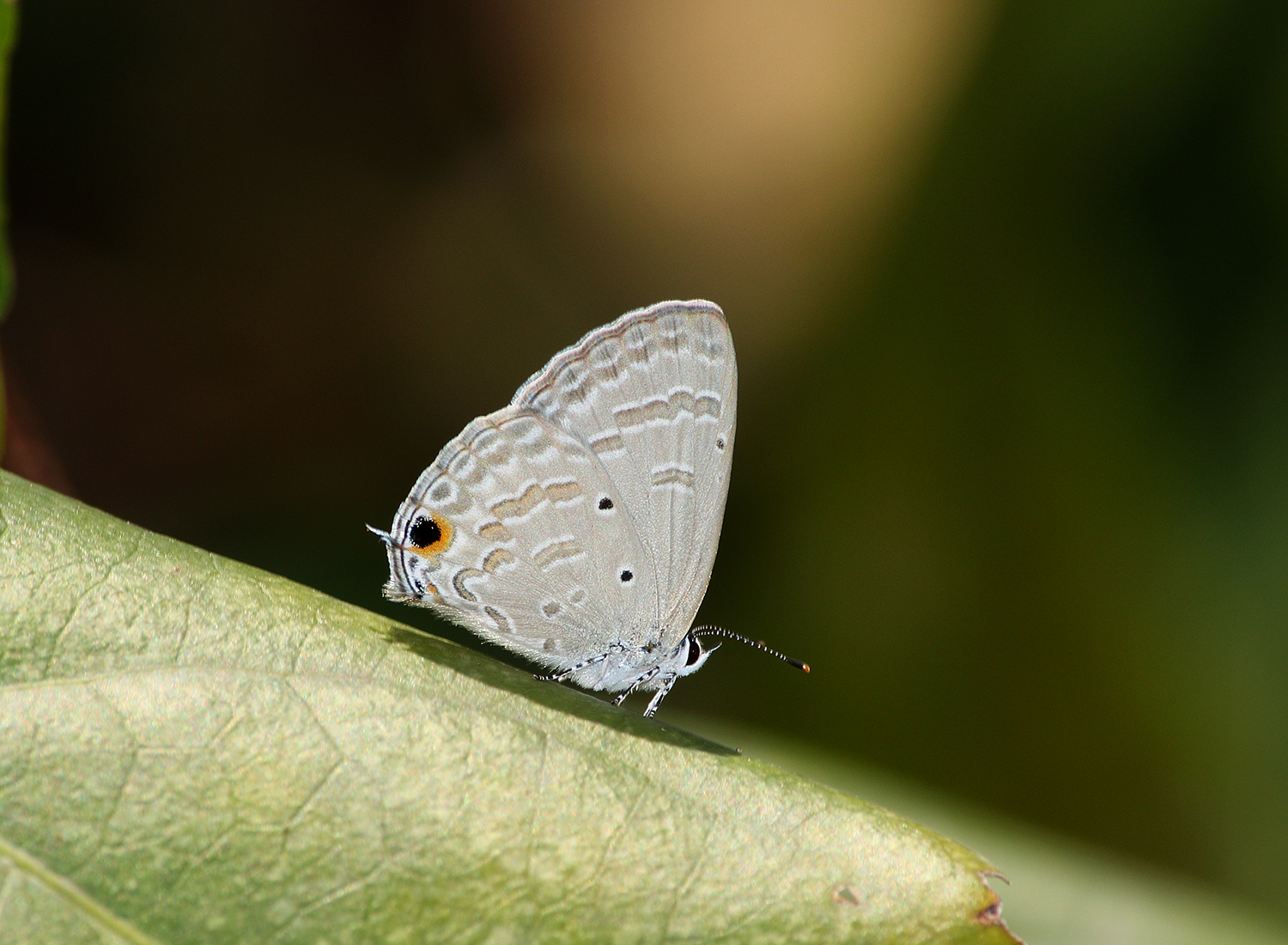
Ventral view

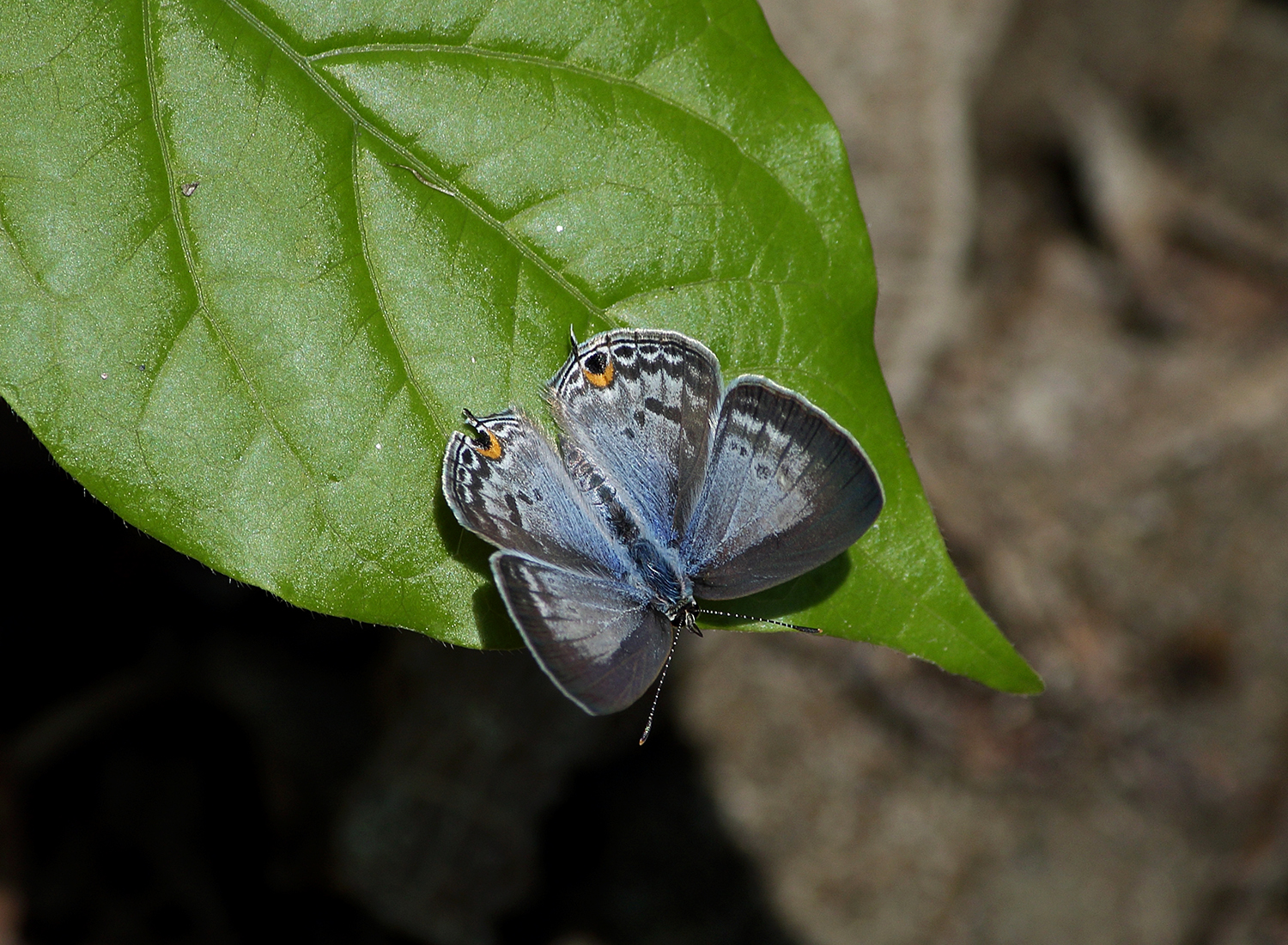
Dorsal view

===== Species: Catochrysops strabo (forget-me-not) =====
Subspecies: Catochrysops strabo strabo (Oriental forget-me-not)

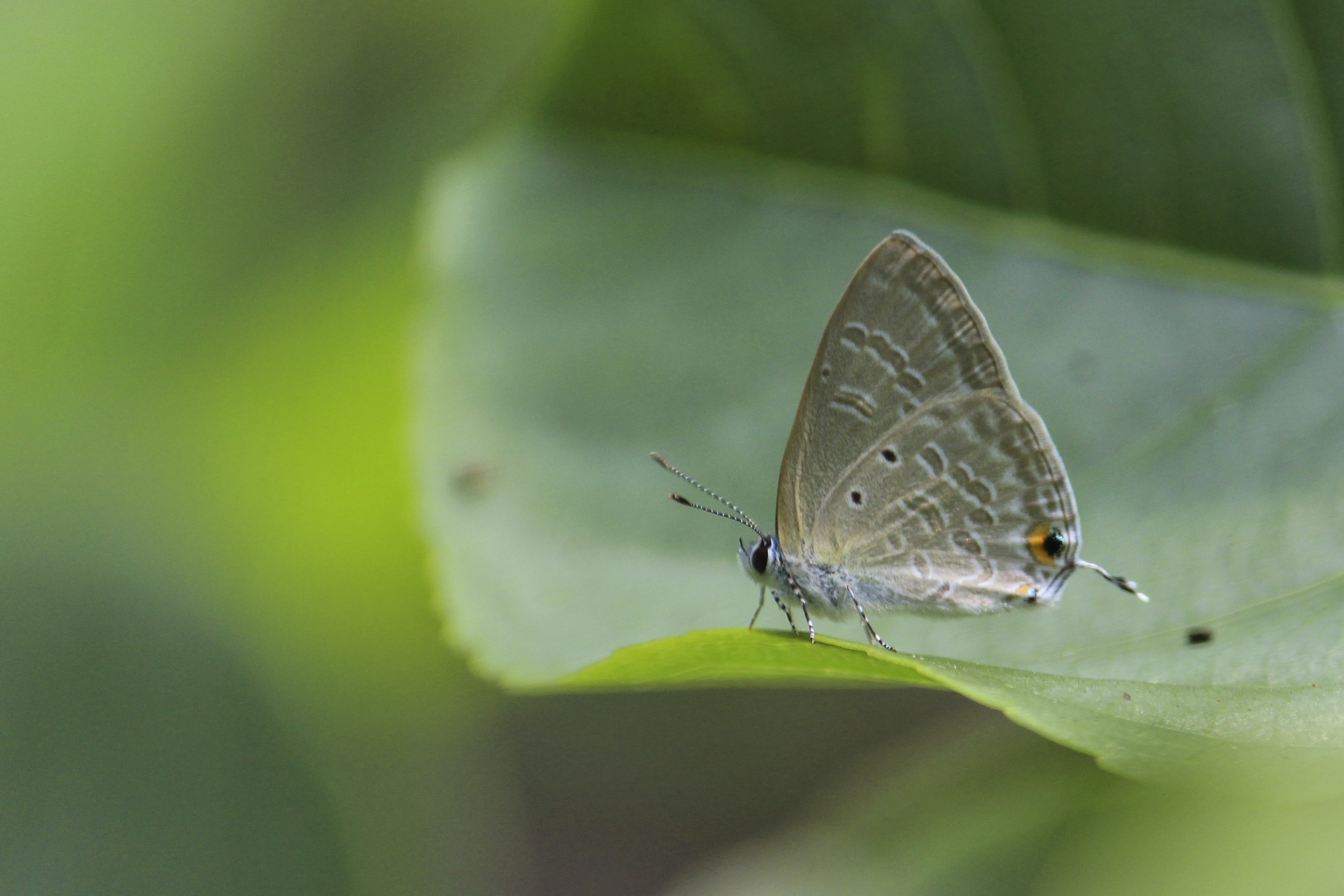
Ventral view

==== Genus: Luthrodes ====
===== Species: Luthrodes pandava (plains Cupid) =====
Subspecies: Luthrodes pandava pandava (Oriental plains Cupid)

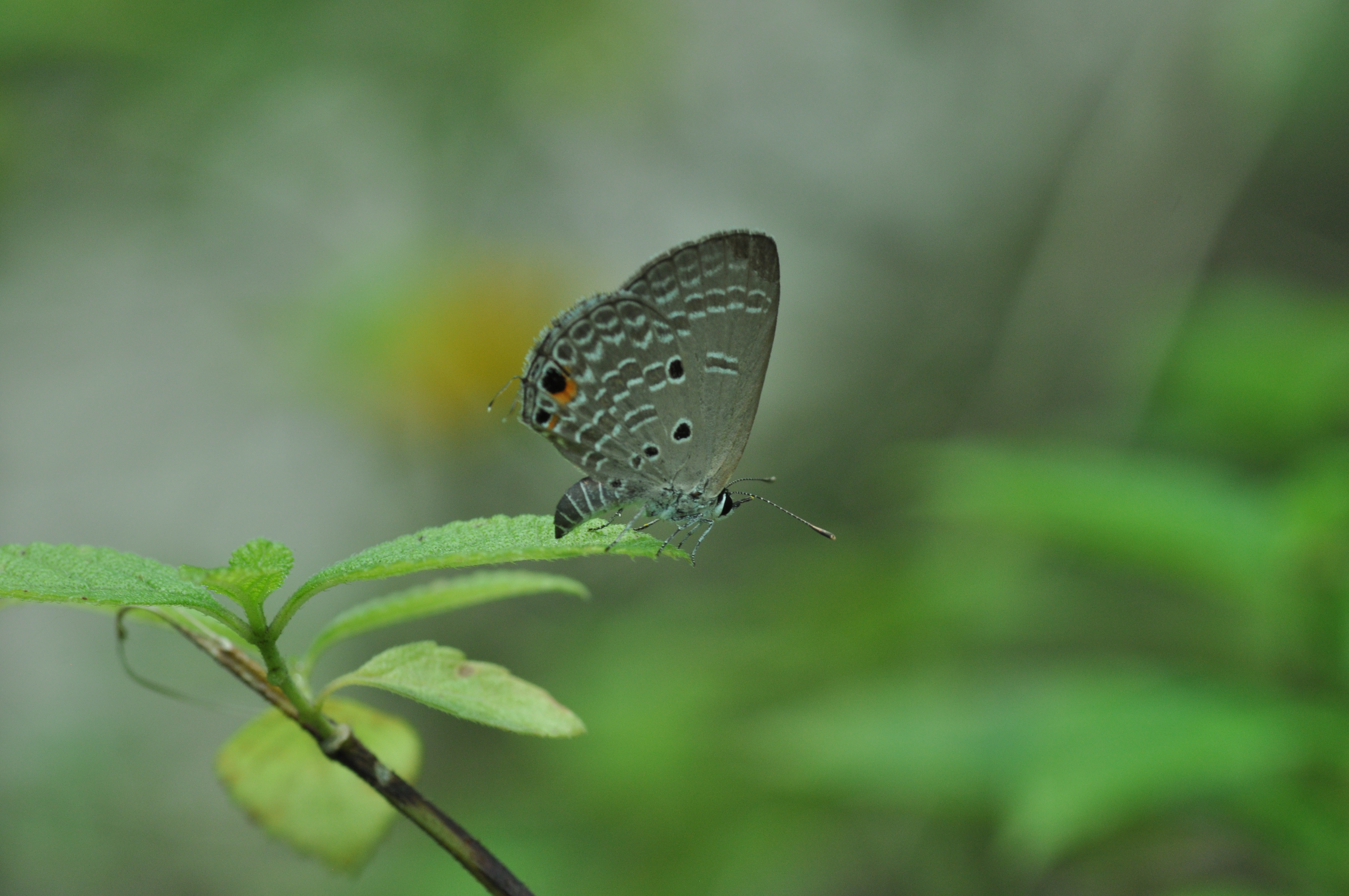
Ventral view

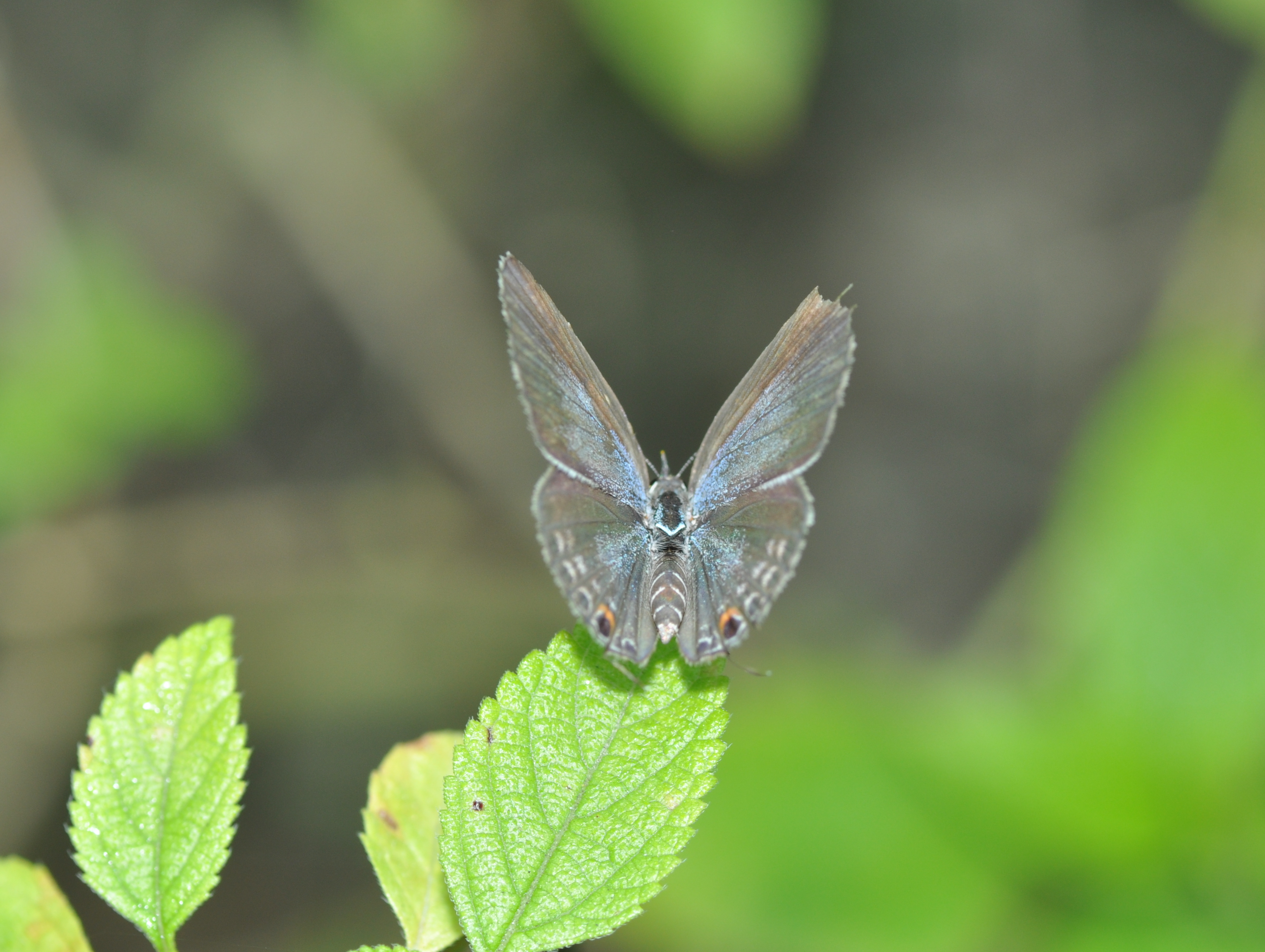
Dorsal view

==== Genus: Everes ====
===== Species: Everes lacturnus (Oriental Cupid) =====
Subspecies: Everes lacturnus syntala (Dakhan Cupid)

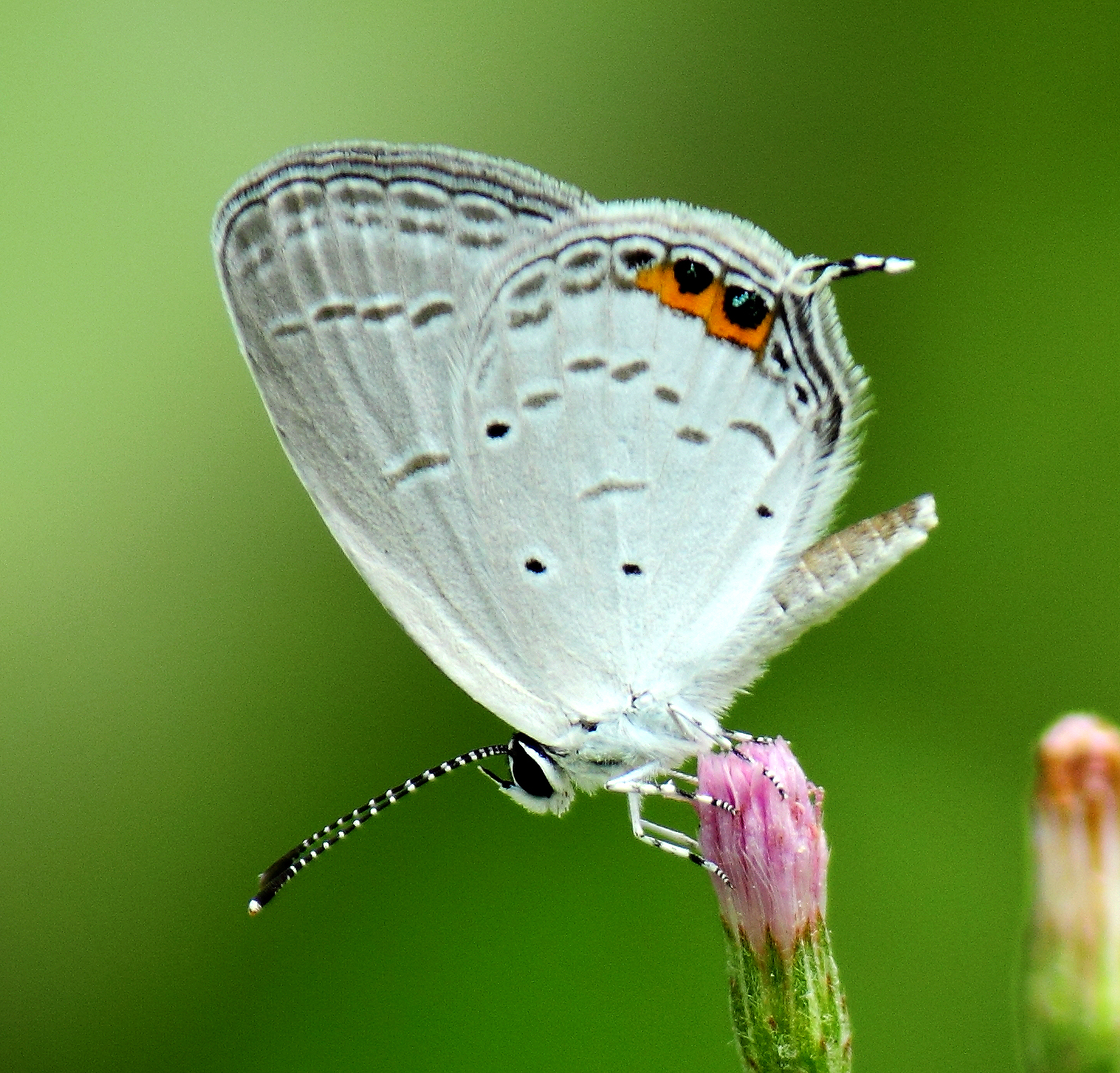
Ventral view (male)

==== Genus: Jamides ====
===== Species: Jamides bochus (dark cerulean) =====
Subspecies: Jamides bochus bochus (Indian dark cerulean)

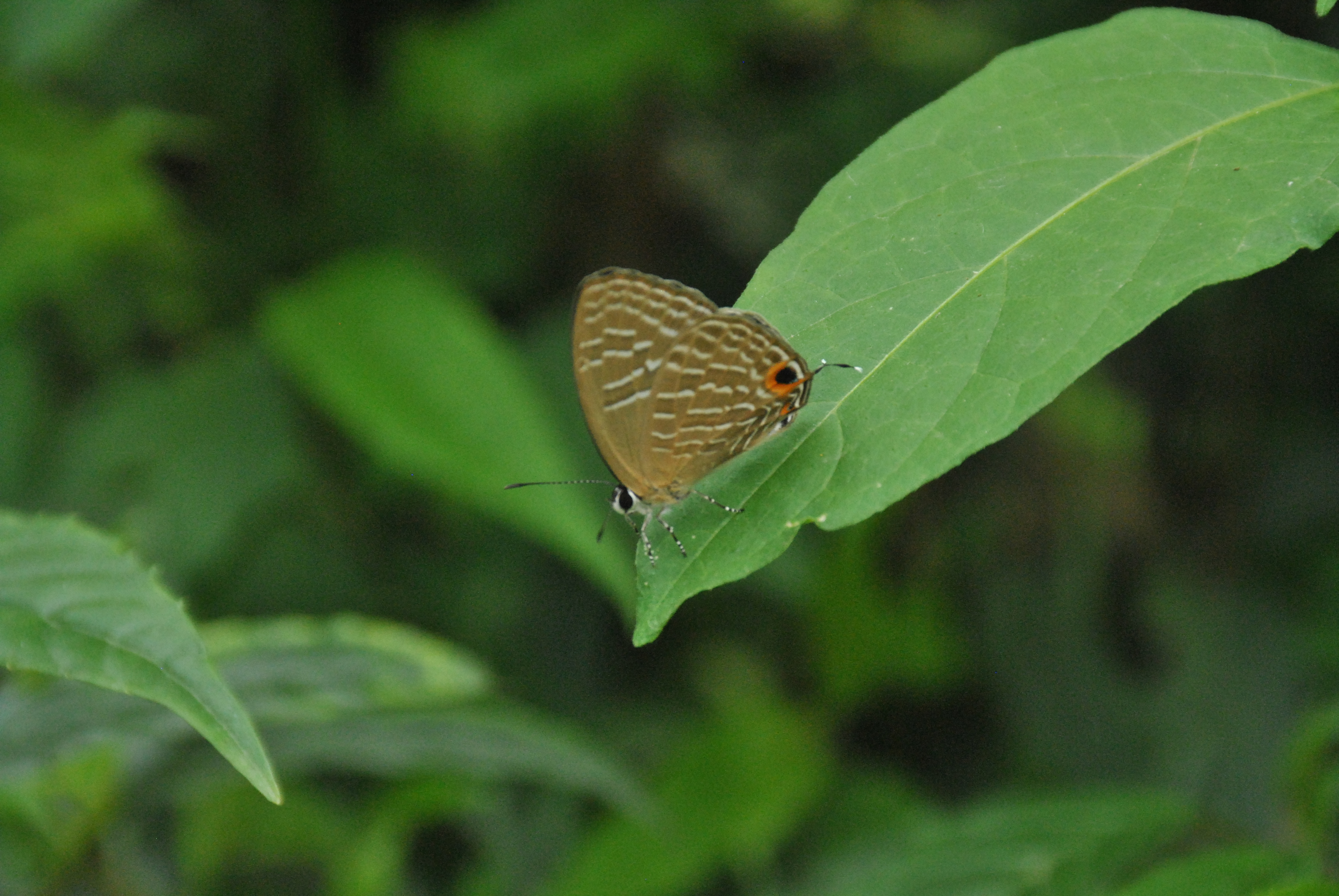
Ventral view

===== Species: Jamides celeno (common cerulean) =====
Subspecies: Jamides celeno celeno (Oriental common cerulean)

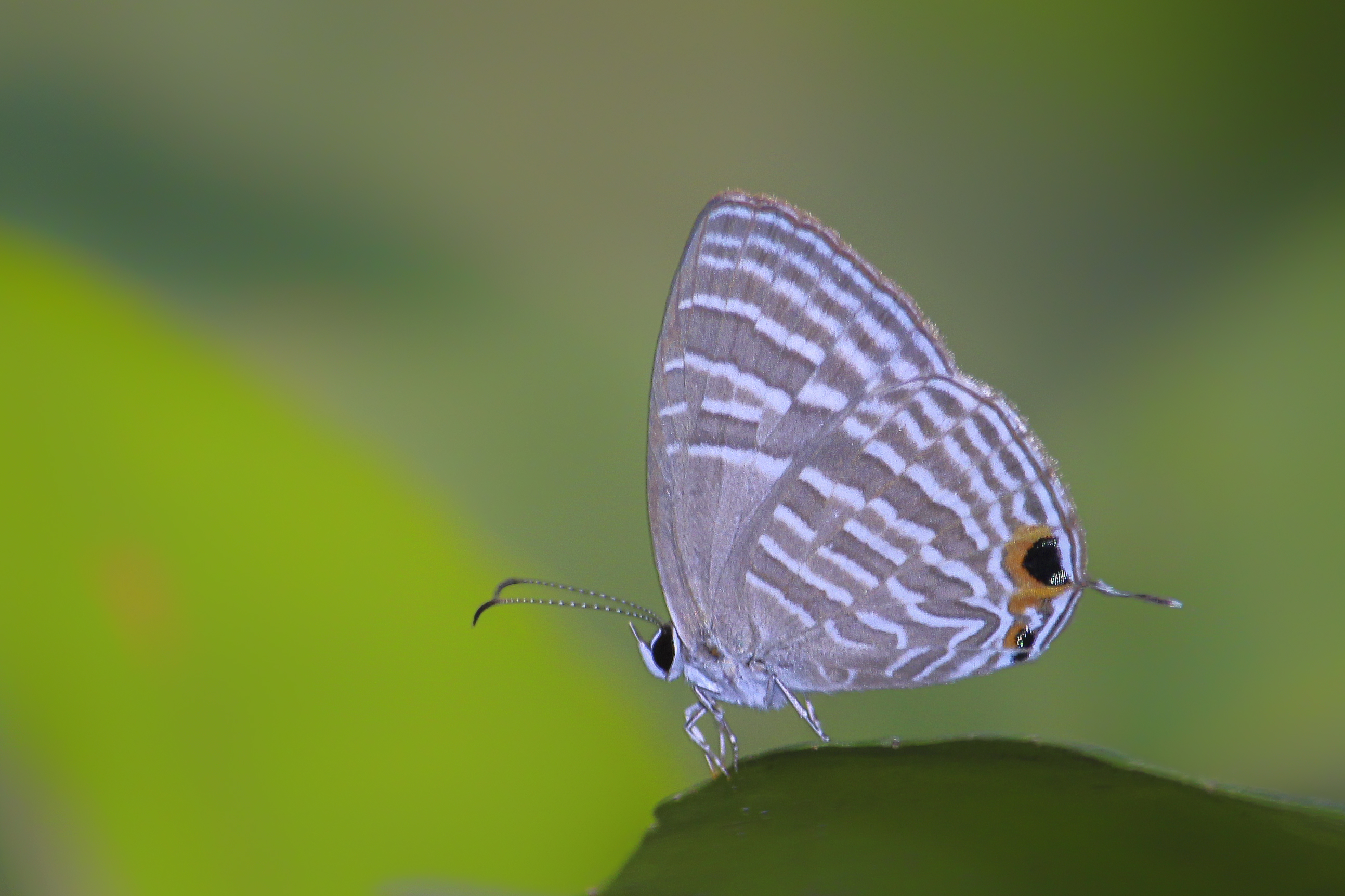
Ventral view

==== Genus: Leptotes ====
===== Species: Leptotes plinius (zebra blue) =====
Subspecies: Leptotes plinius plinius (Asian zebra blue)

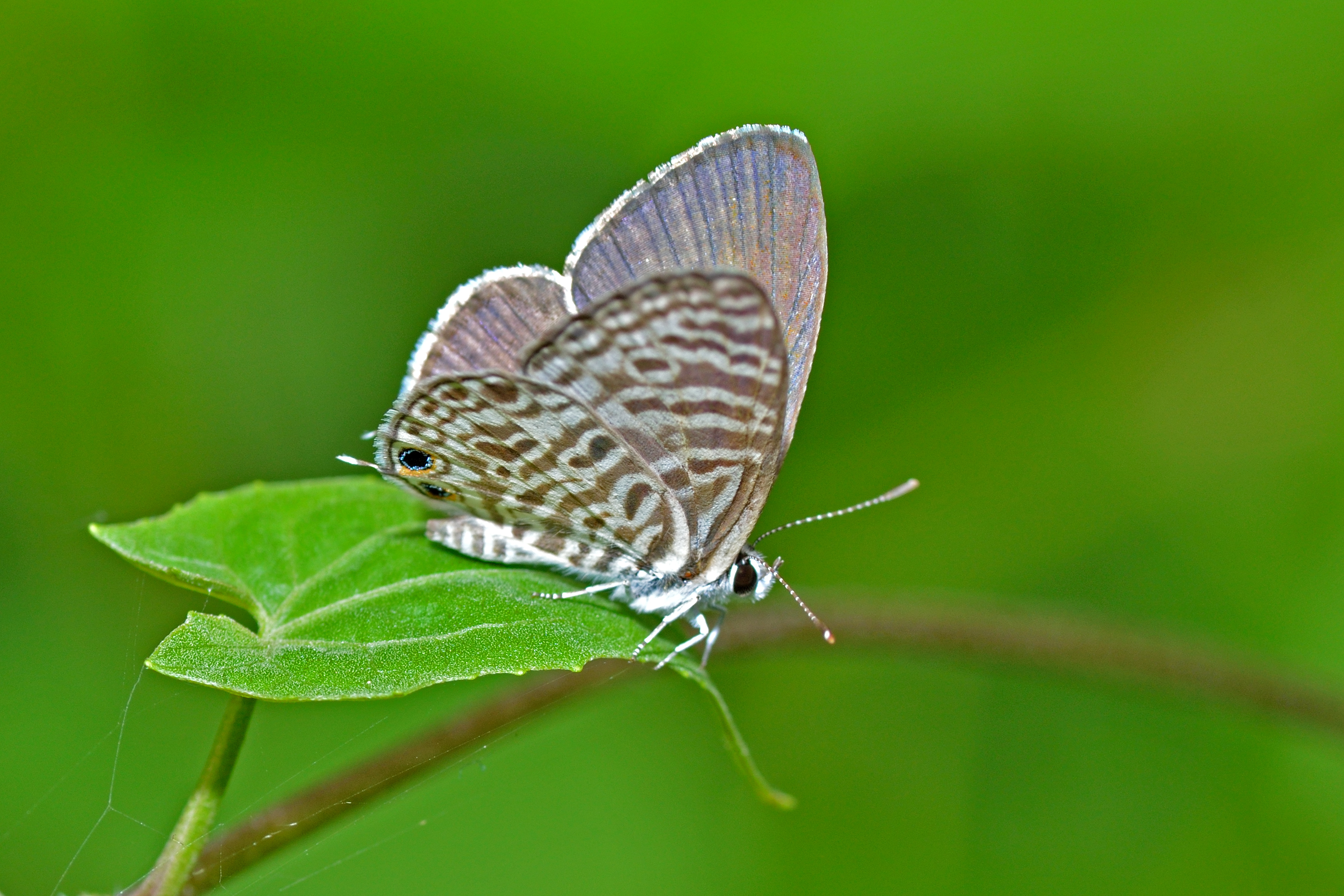
Ventral view

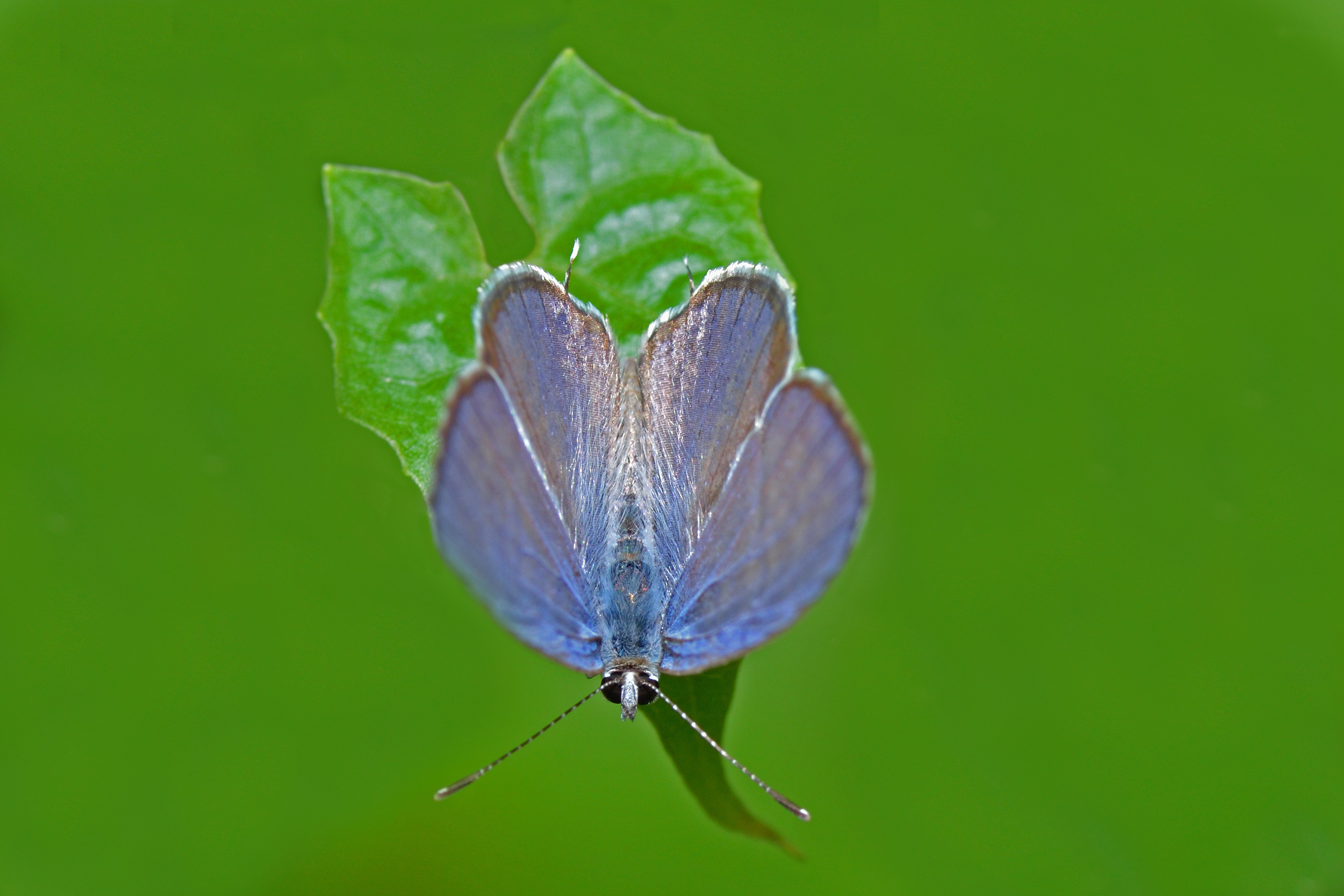
Dorsal view

==== Genus: Neopithecops ====
===== Species: Neopithecops zalmora (common Quaker) =====
Subspecies: Neopithecops zalmora zalmora (Myanmar common Quaker)

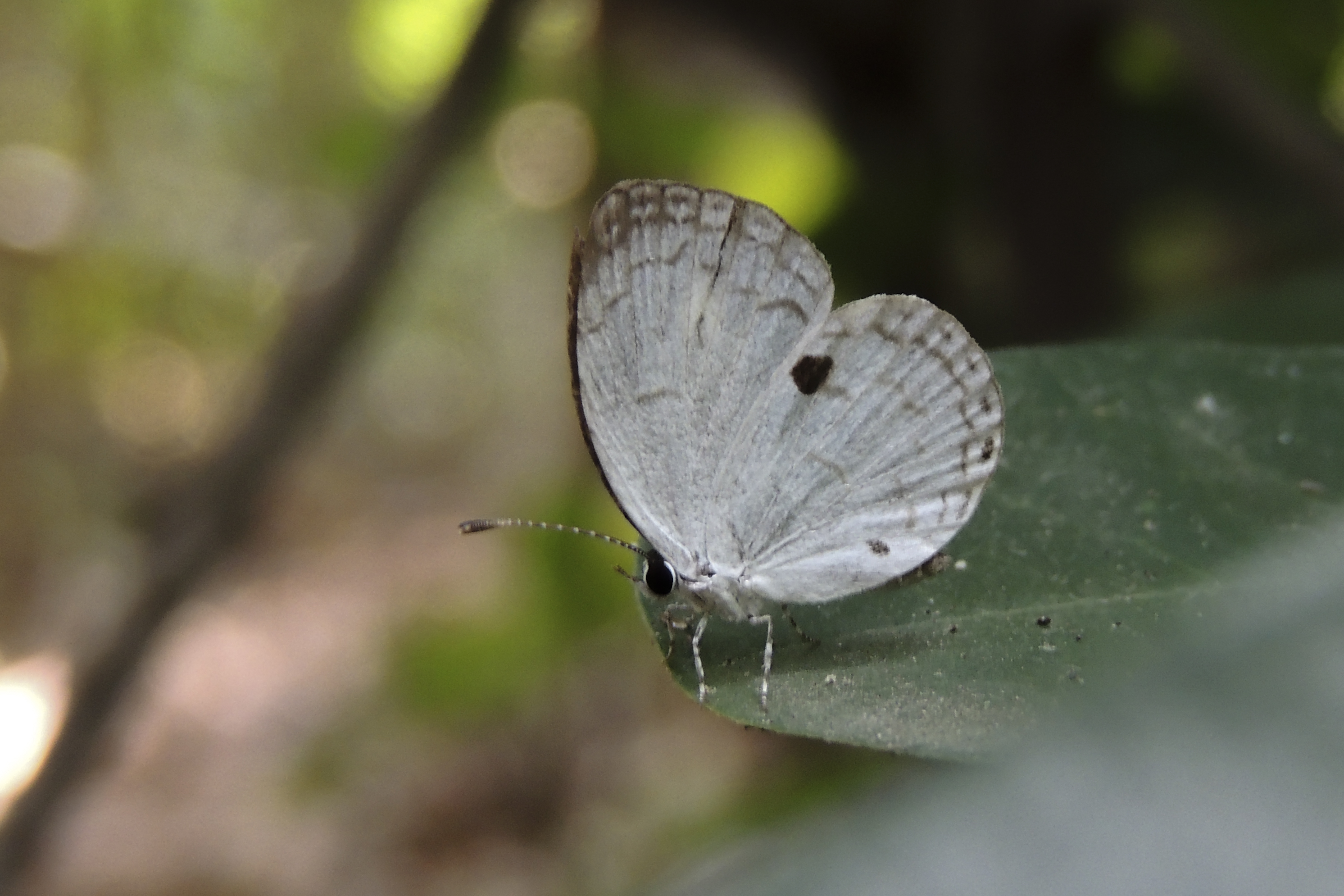
Ventral view

==== Genus: Prosotas ====
===== Species: Prosotas dubiosa (tailless lineblue) =====
Subspecies: Prosotas dubiosa indica (Indian tailless lineblue)

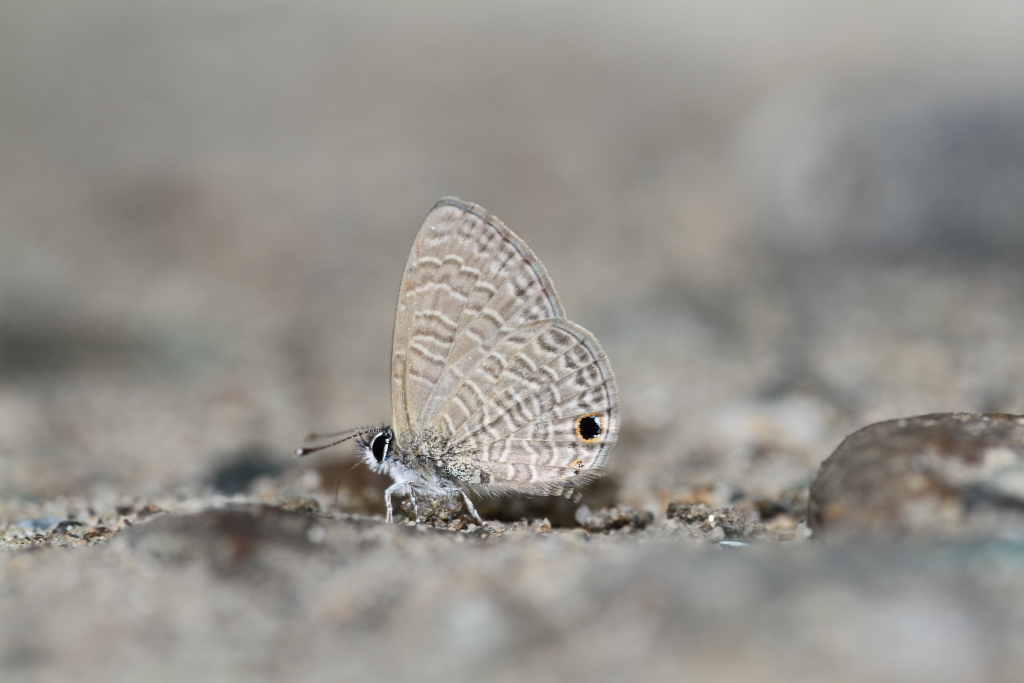
Ventral view

===== Species: Prosotas nora (common lineblue) =====
Subspecies: Prosotas nora ardates (Indian common lineblue)

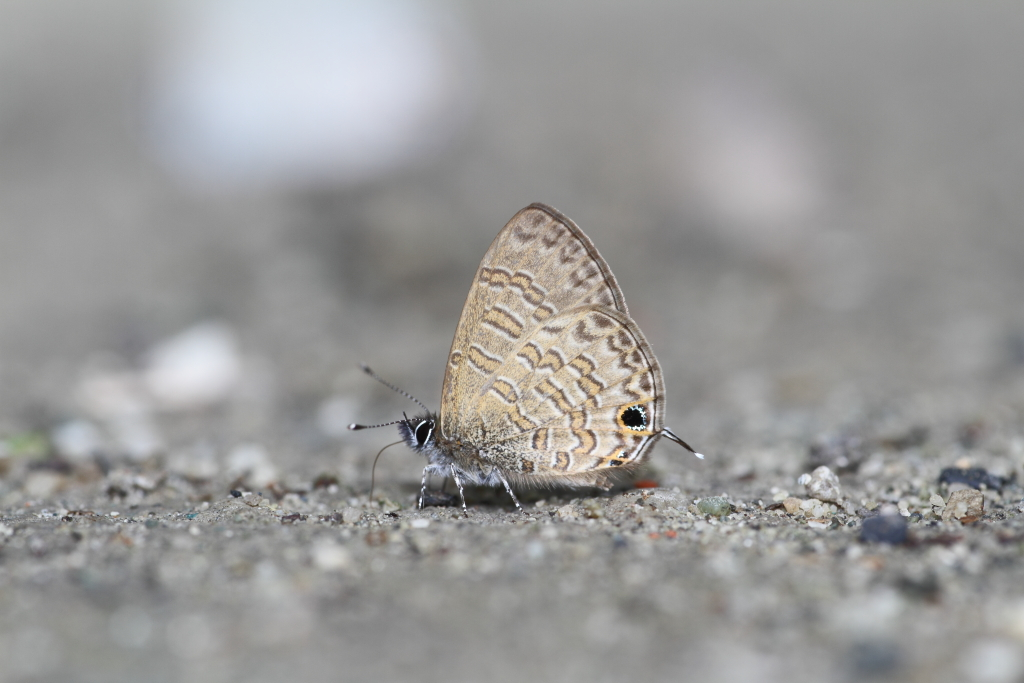
Ventral view

==== Genus: Pseudozizeeria ====
===== Species: Pseudozizeeria maha (pale grass blue) =====
Subspecies: Pseudozizeeria maha maha (Himalayan pale grass blue)

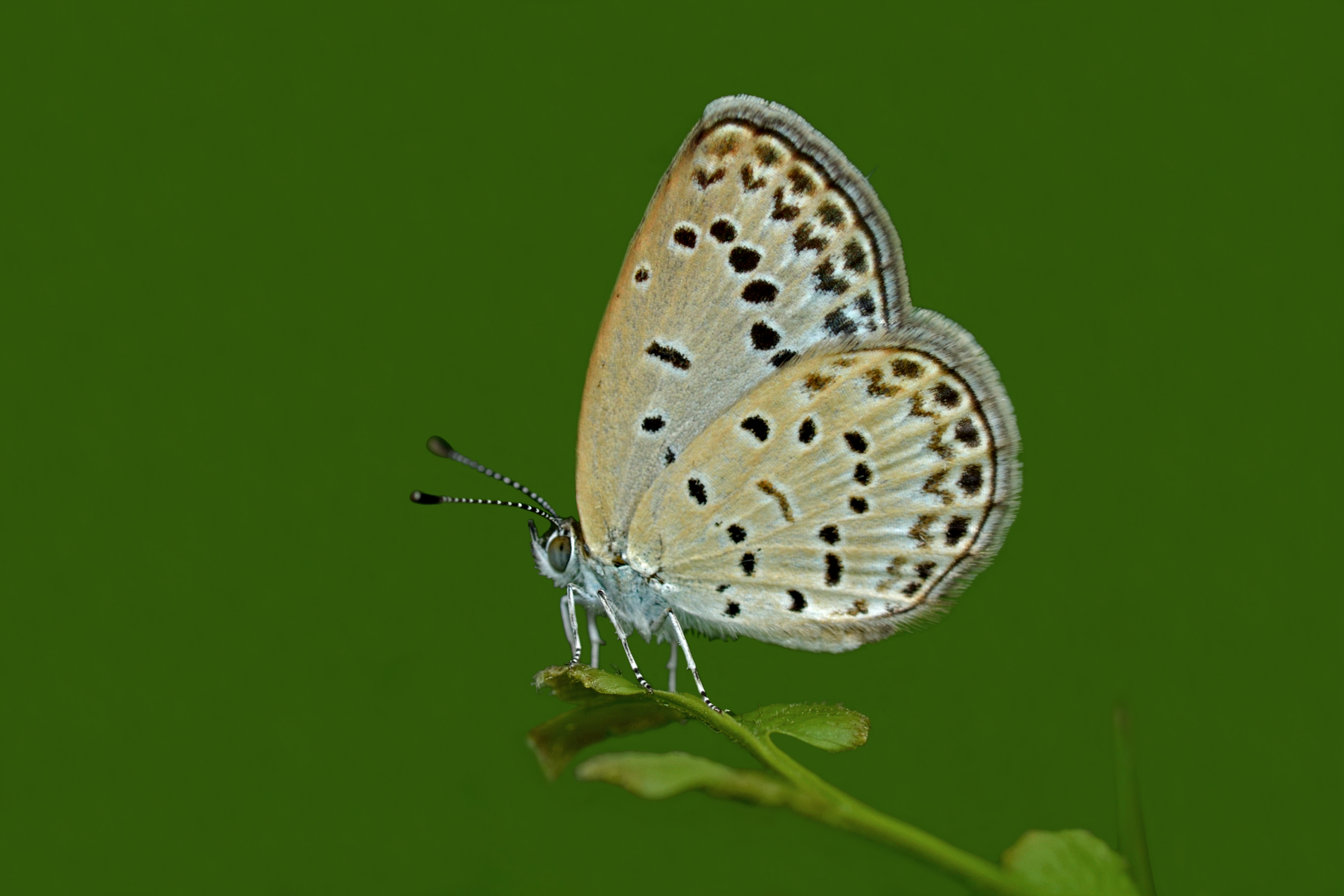
Ventral view

==== Genus: Zizeeria ====
===== Species: Zizeeria karsandra (dark grass blue) =====
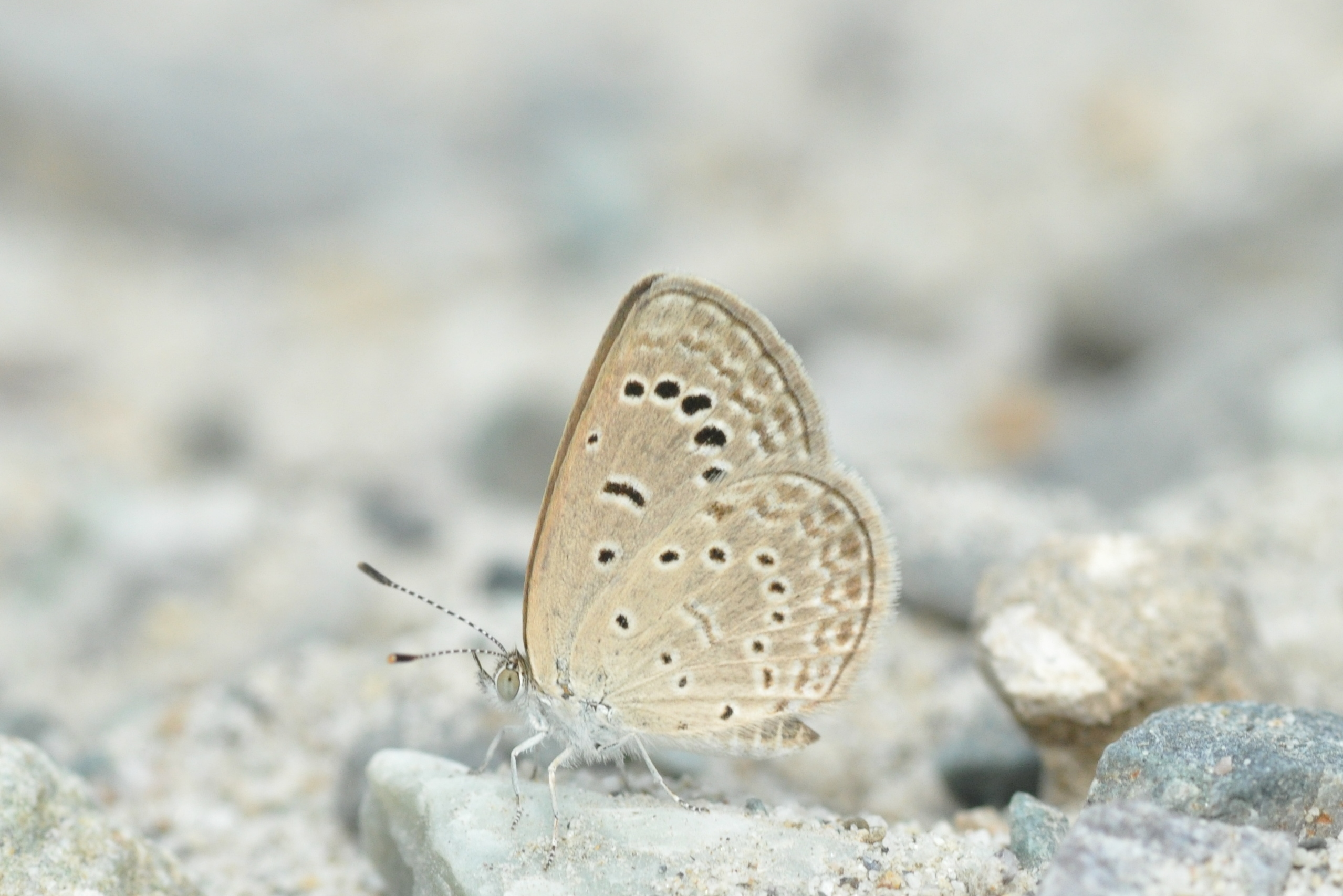
Ventral view

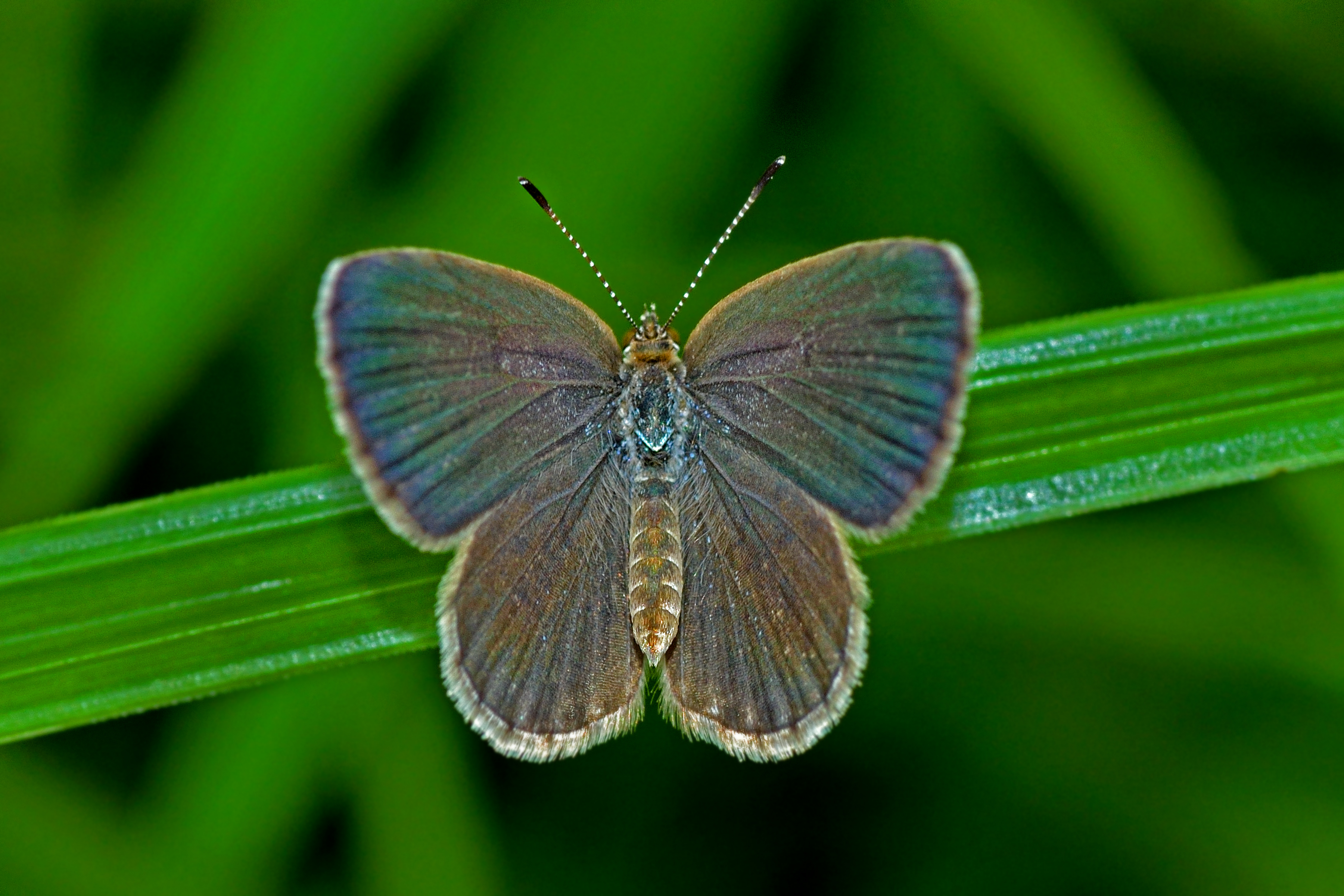
Dorsal view (female)

==== Genus: Zizina ====
===== Species: Zizina otis (lesser grass blue) =====
Subspecies: Zizina otis otis (Oriental lesser grass blue)

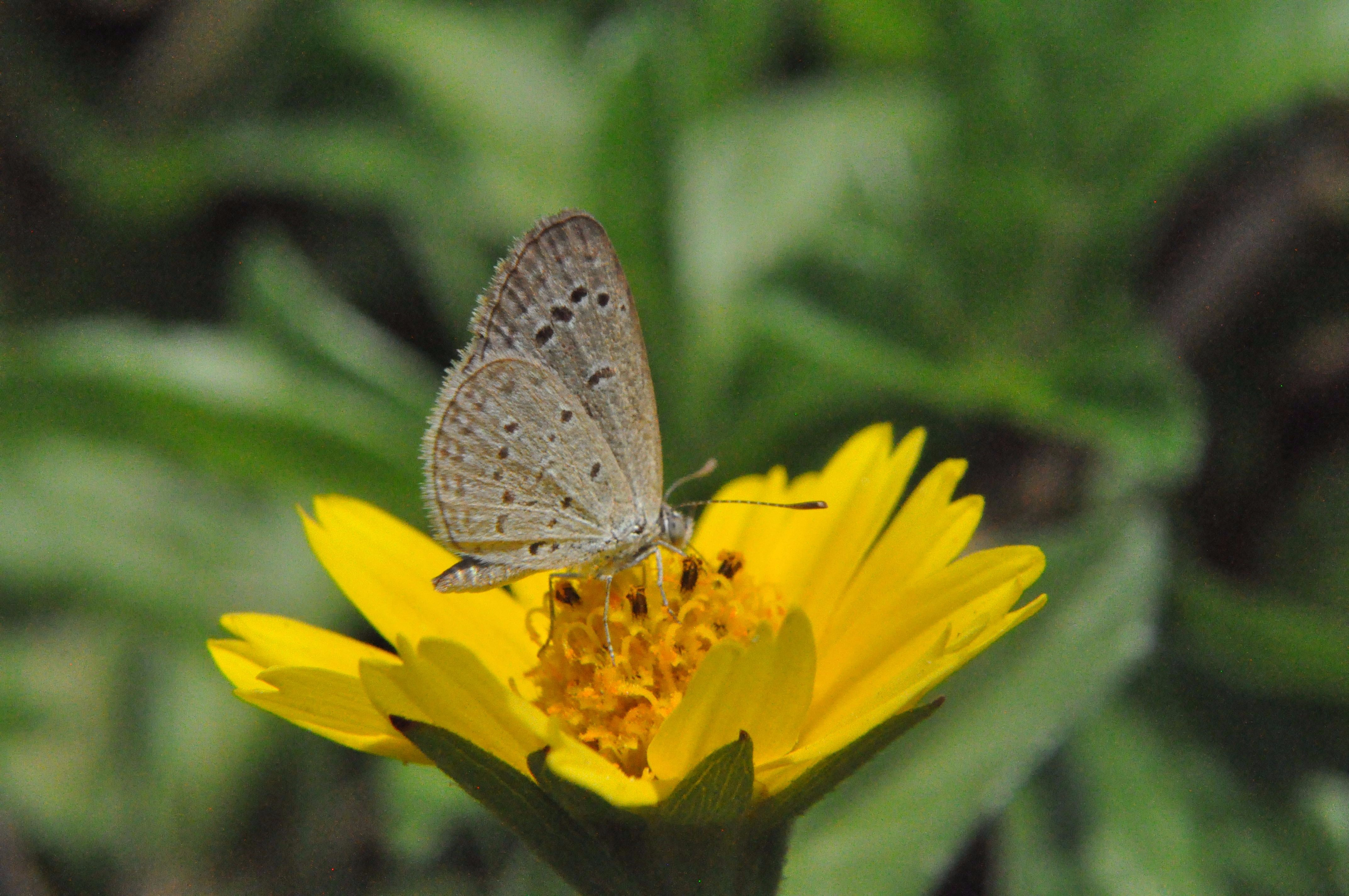
Ventral view

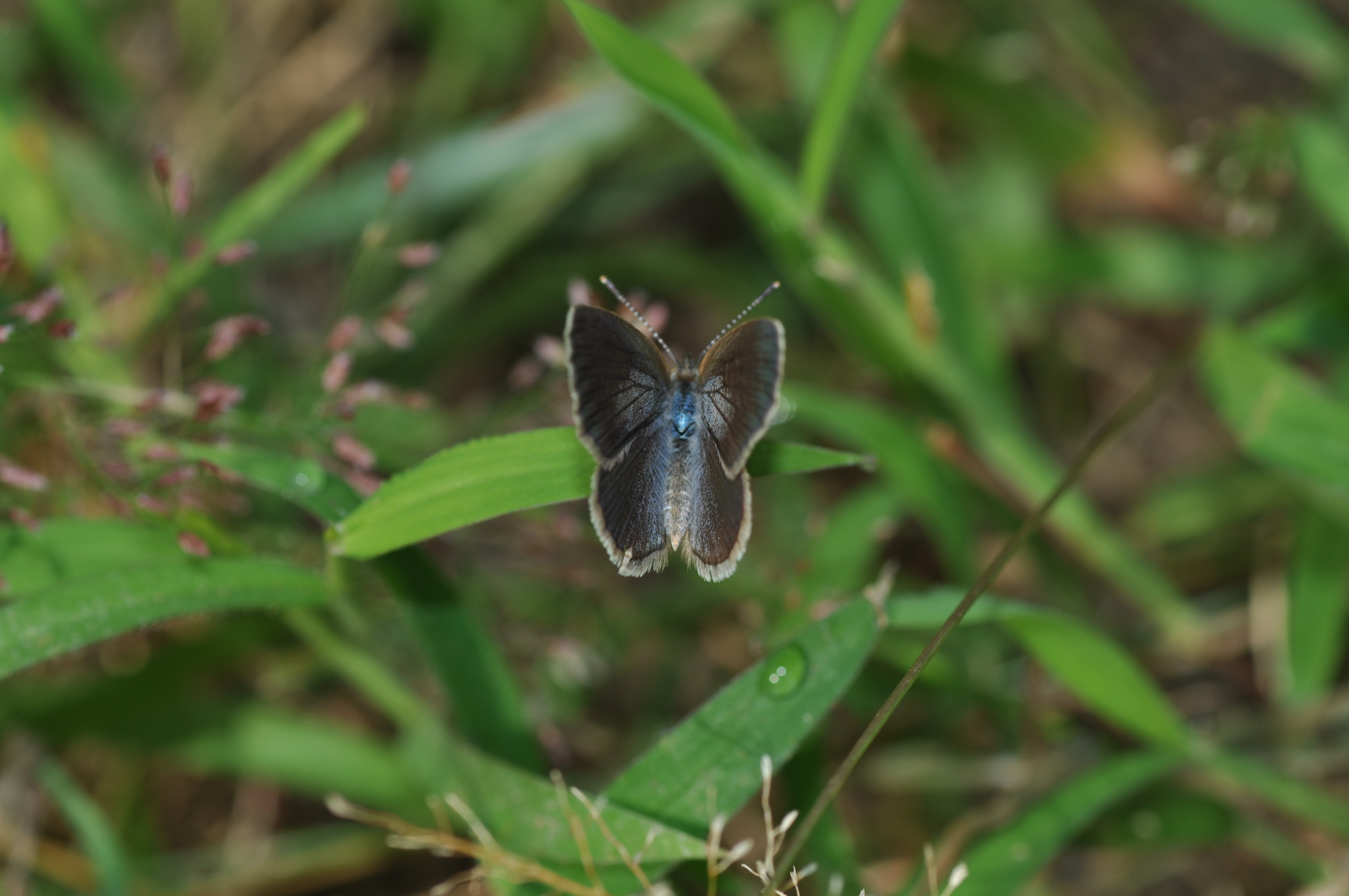
Dorsal view (female)

=== Subfamily: Poritiinae ===
Tribe: Poritiini

==== Genus: Poritia ====
===== Species: Poritia hewitsoni (common gem) =====
Subspecies: Poritia hewitsoni hewitsoni (Himalayan common gem)

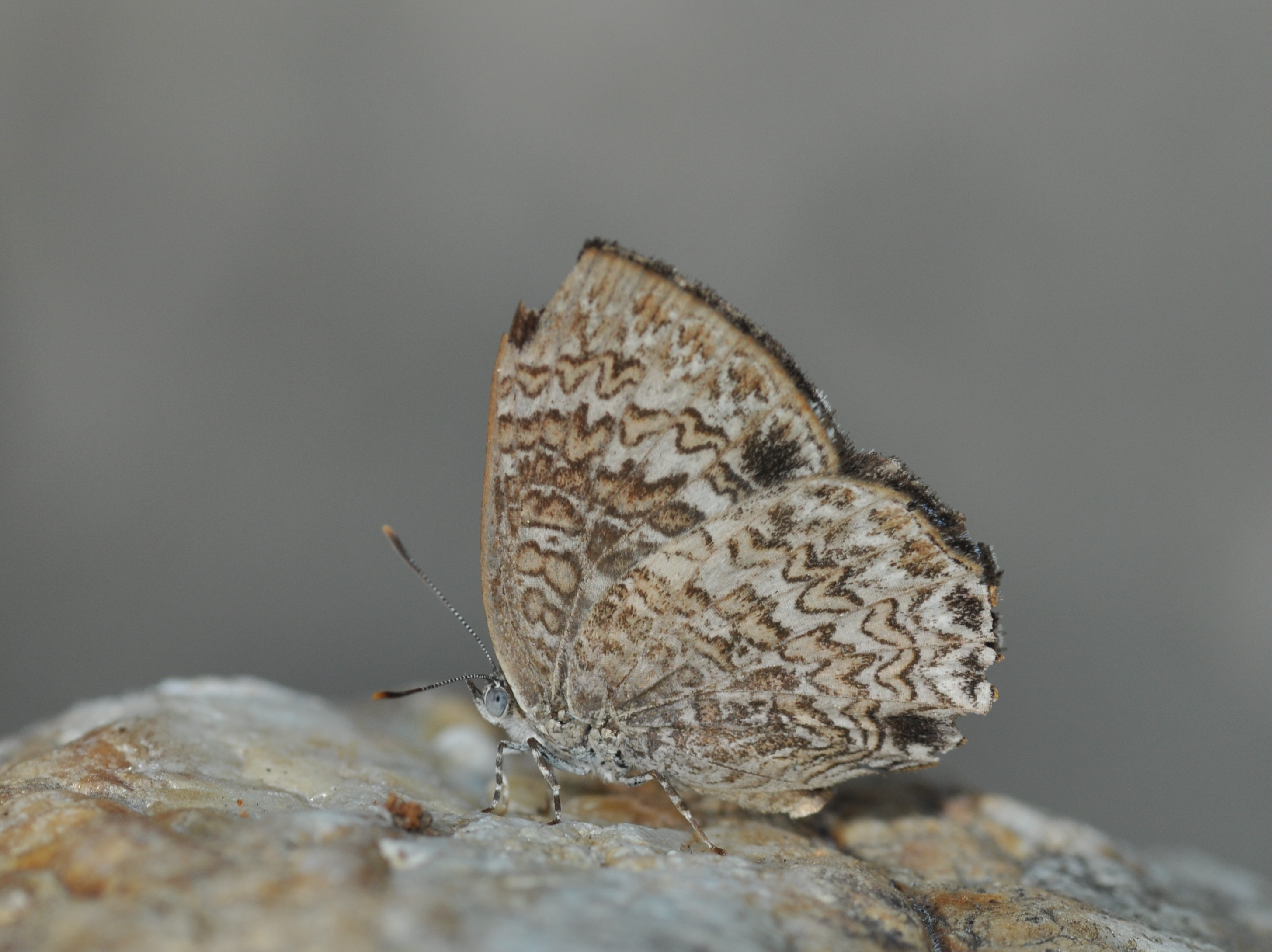
Ventral view (female)

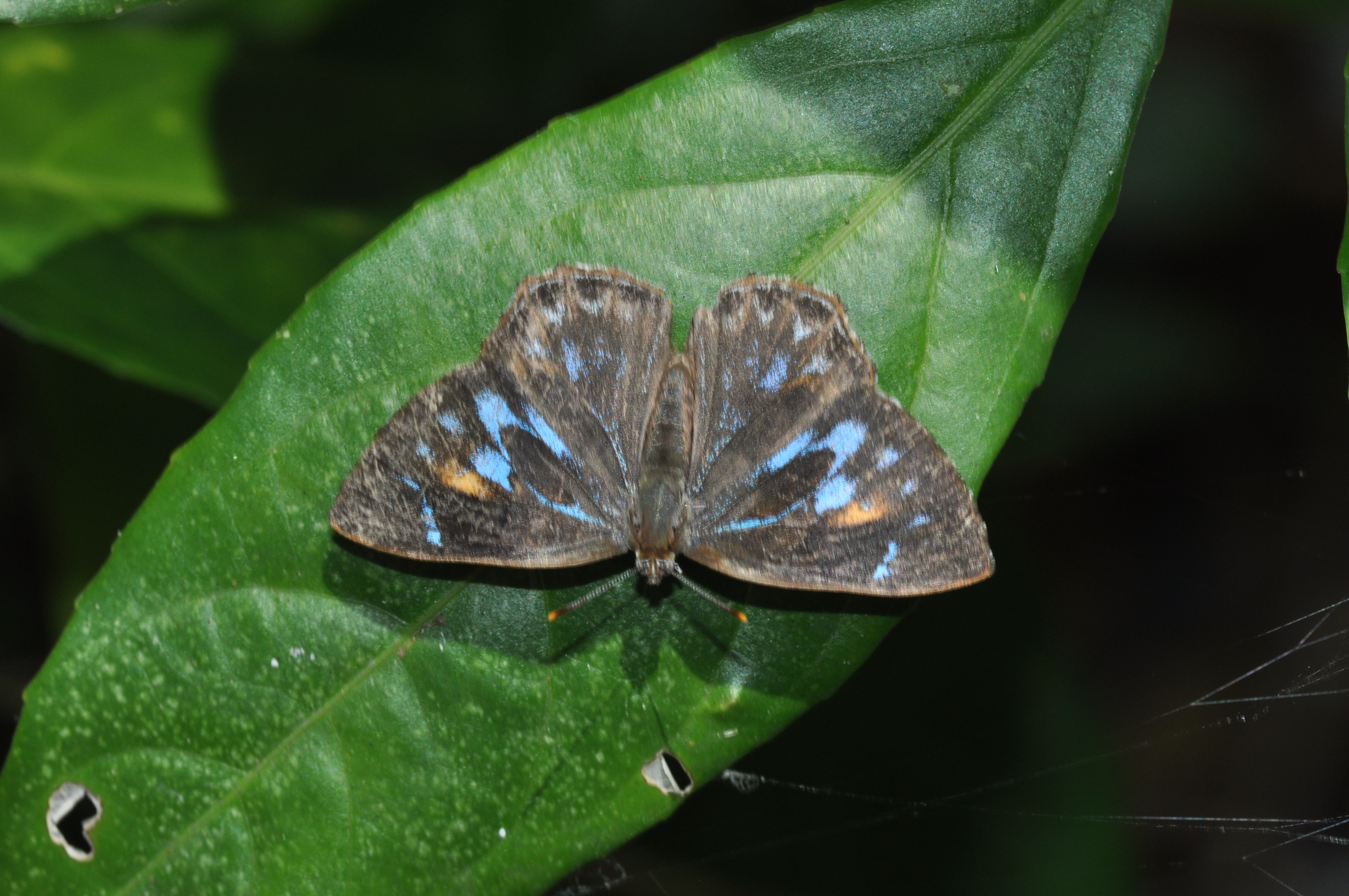
Dorsal view (female)

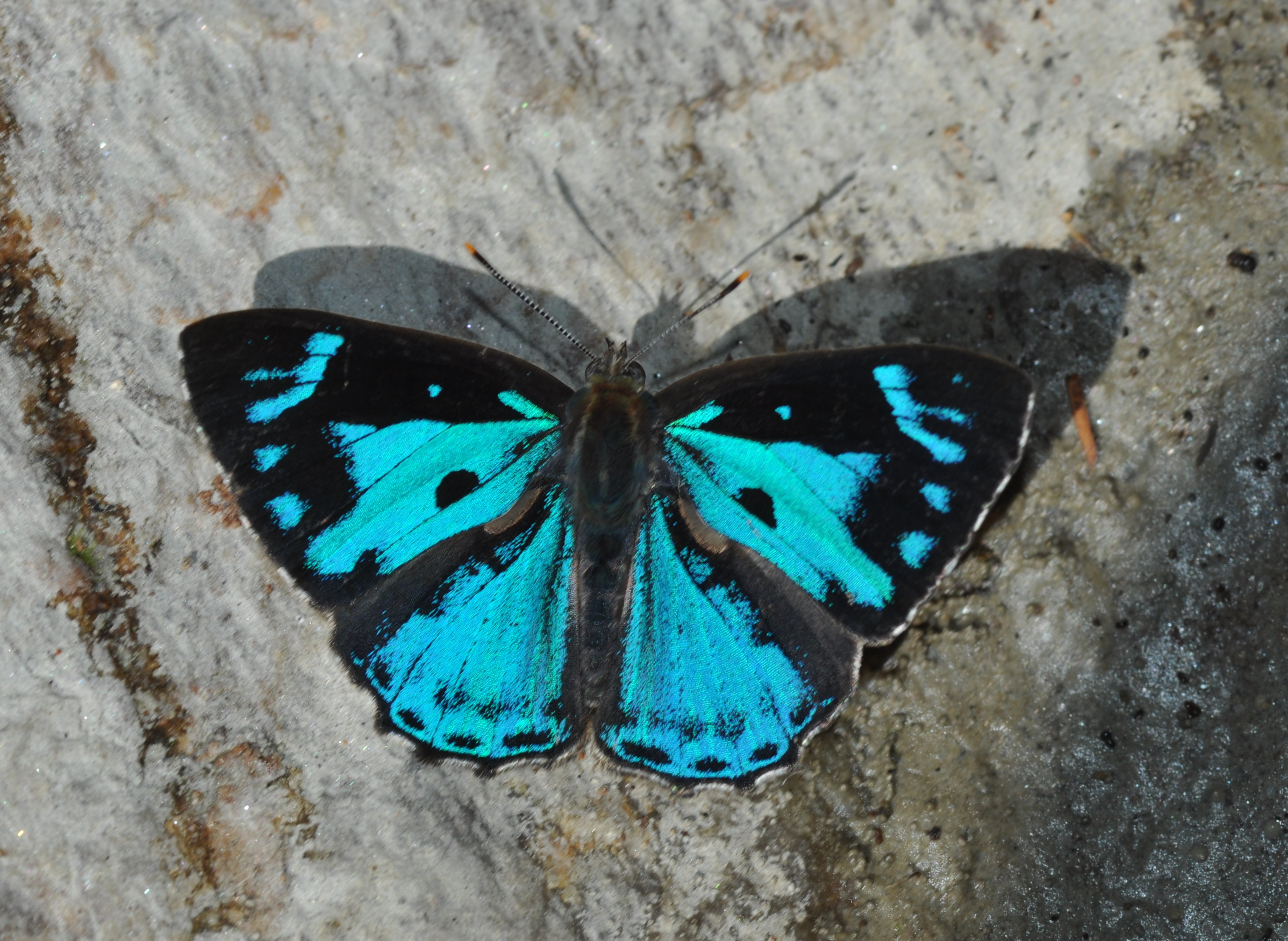
Dorsal view (male)

=== Subfamily: Theclinae ===
Tribe: Amblypodiini

==== Genus: Amblypodia ====
===== Species: Amblypodia anita (purple leaf blue) =====
Subspecies: Amblypodia anita dina (Indian purple leaf blue)

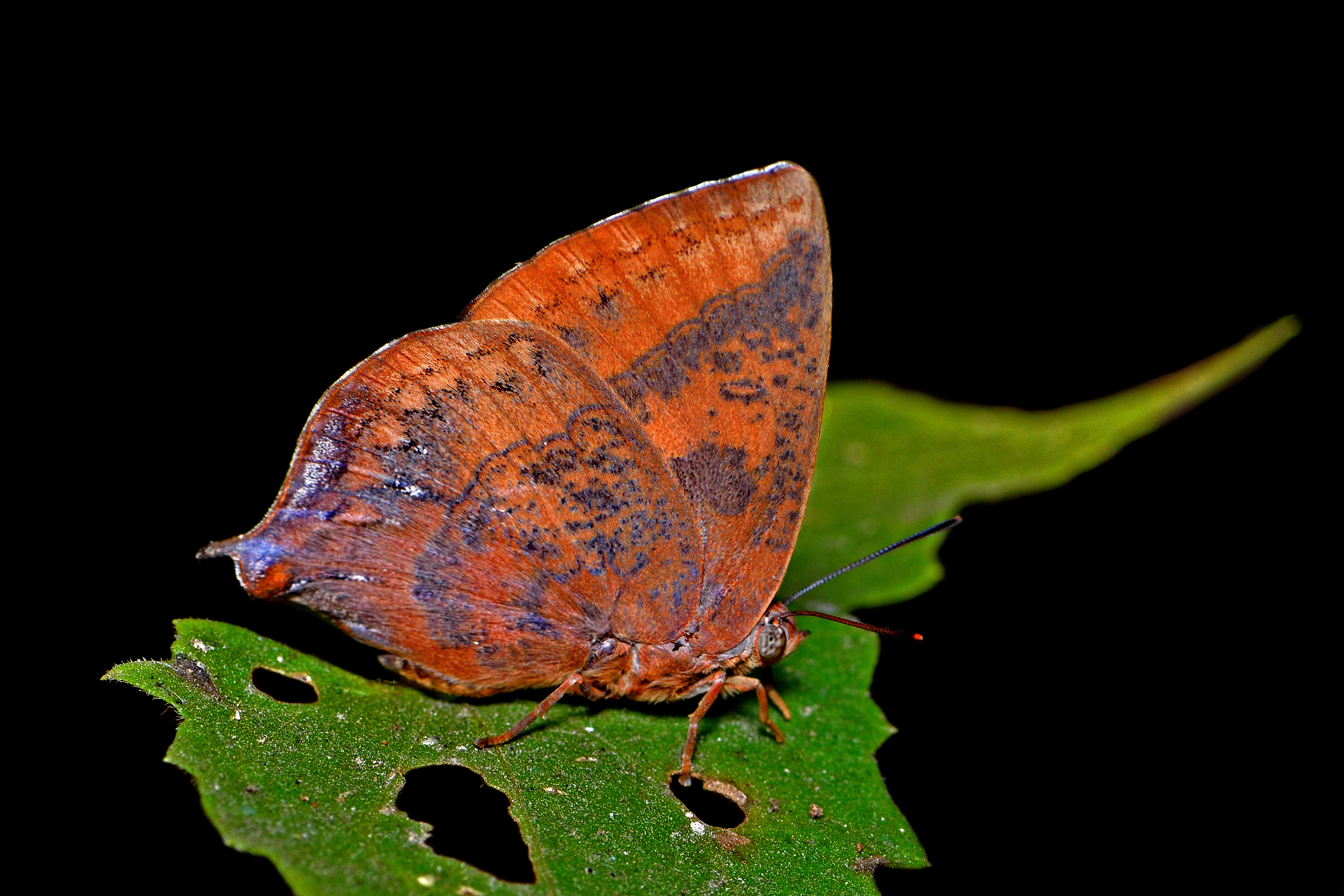
Ventral view (male)

==== Genus: Iraota ====
===== Species: Iraota rochana (scarce silverstreak blue) =====
Subspecies: Iraota rochana boswelliana (Malayan scarce silverstreak blue)

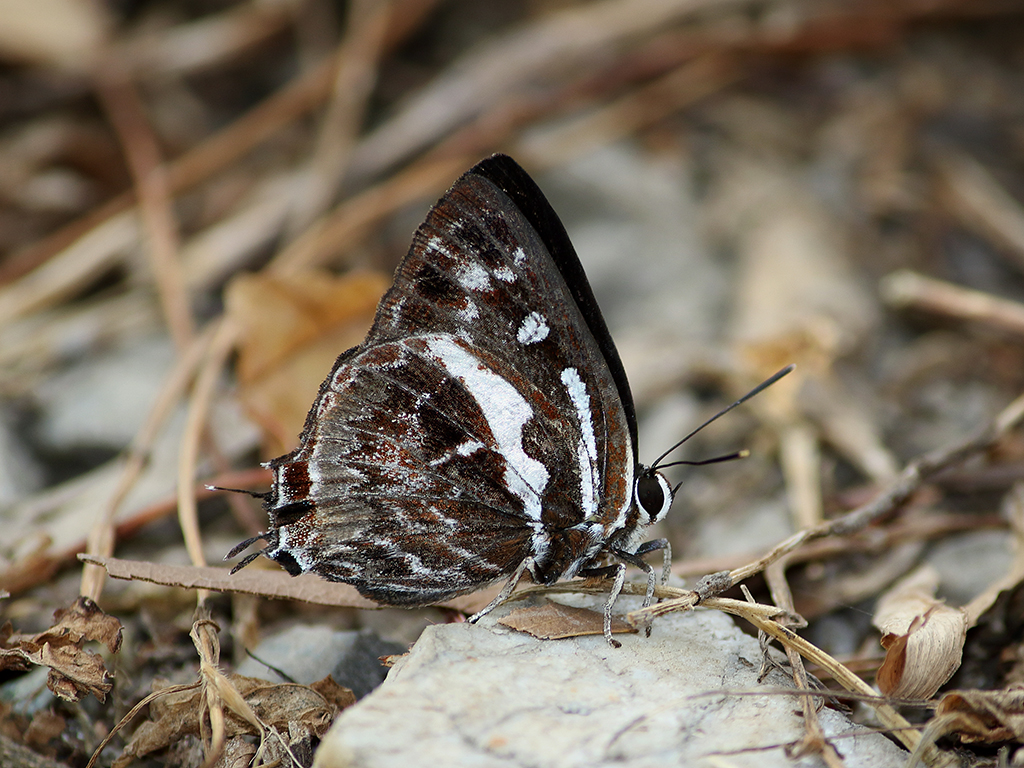
Ventral view (male)

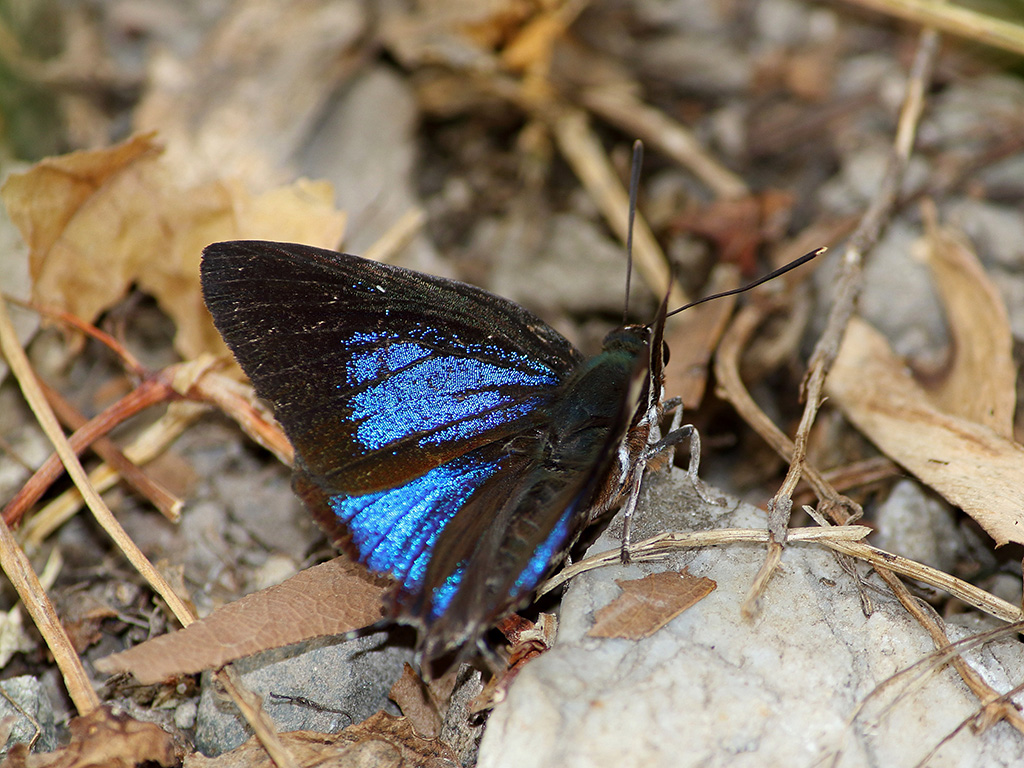
Dorsal view (male)

Tribe: Arhopalini

==== Genus: Arhopala ====
===== Species: Arhopala abseus (aberrant oakblue) =====
Subspecies: Arhopala abseus indicus (Indian aberrant oakblue)

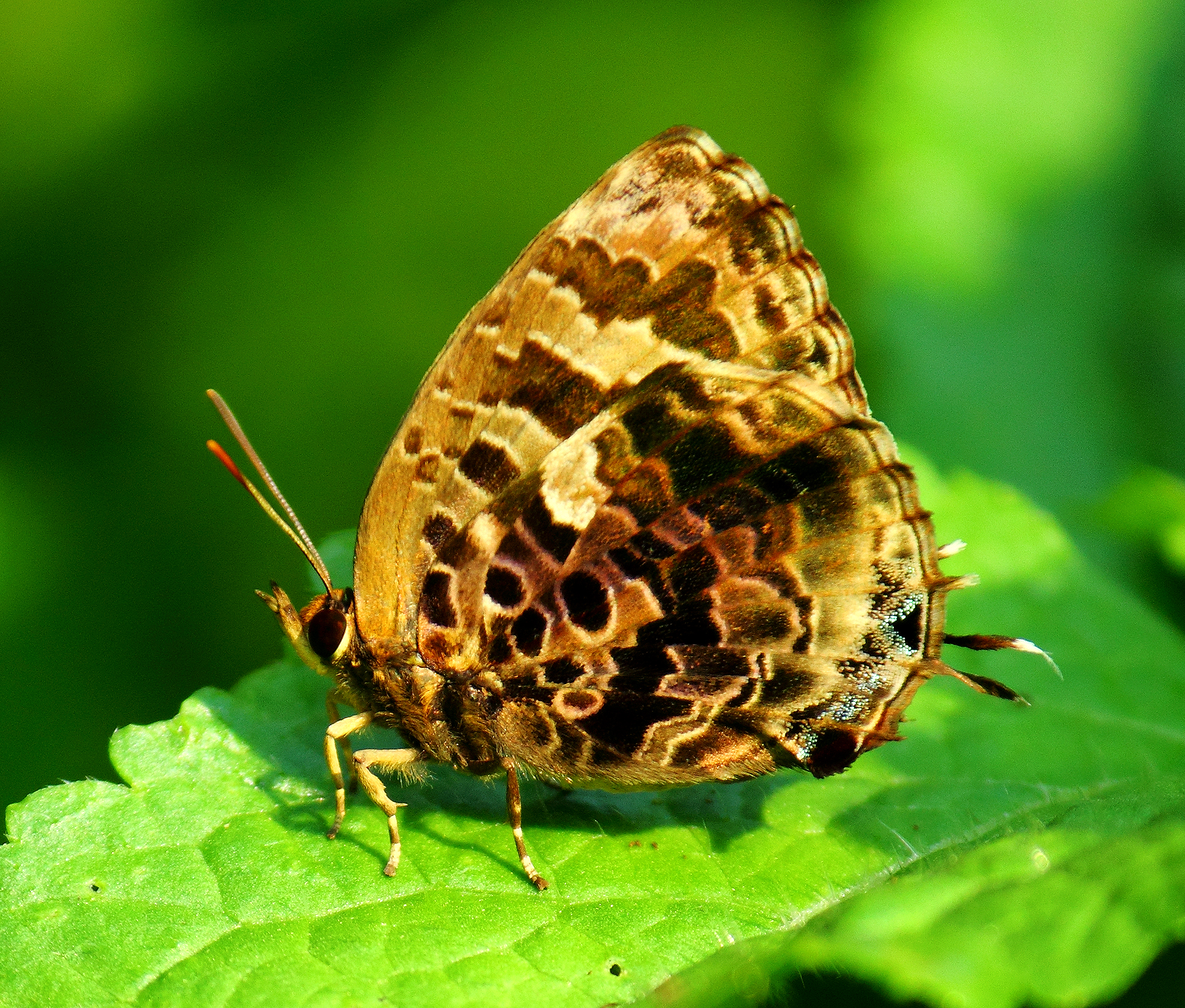
Ventral view

===== Species: Arhopala atrax (Indian oakblue) =====
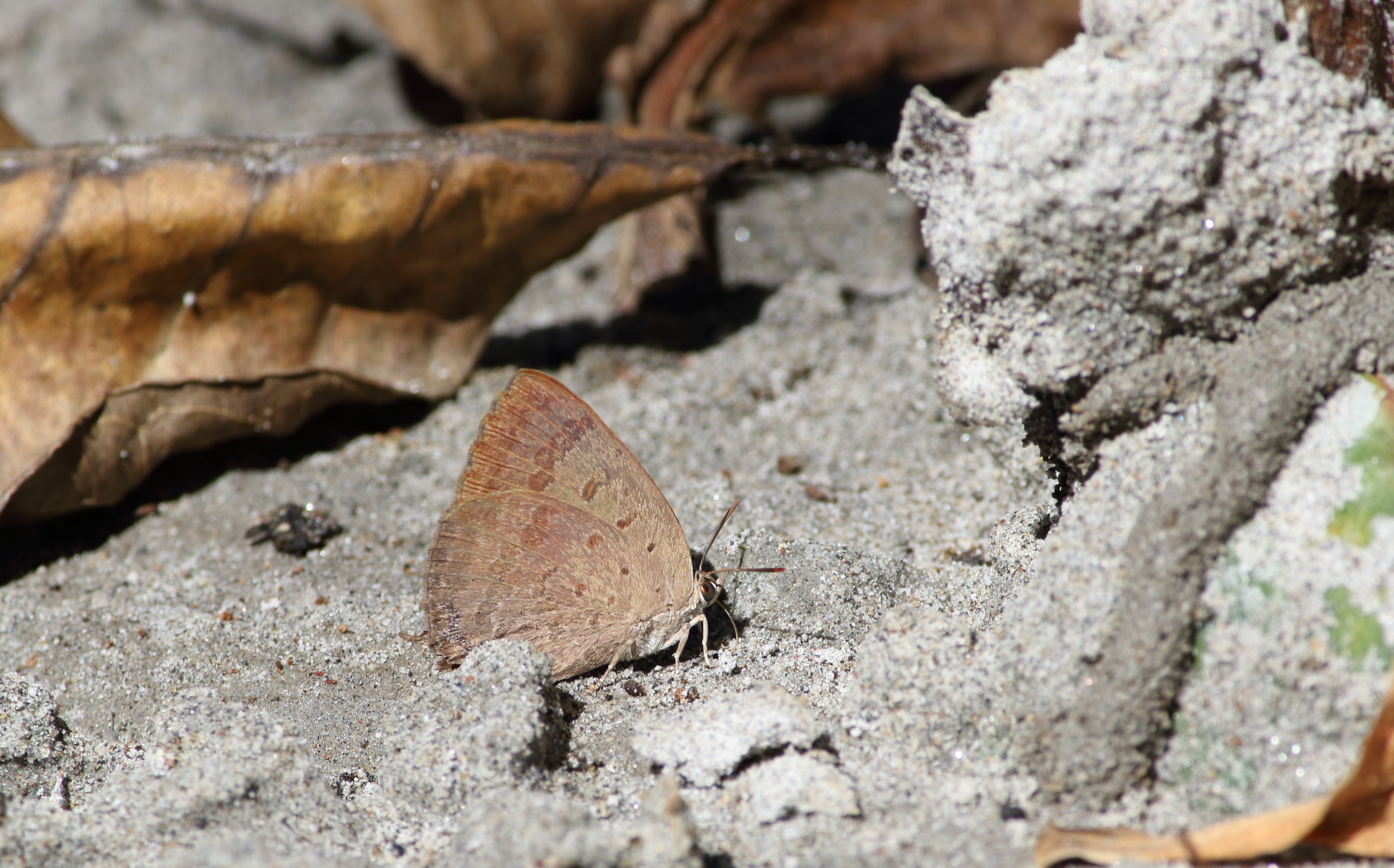
Ventral view

===== Species: Arhopala bazalus (powdered oakblue) =====
Subspecies: Arhopala bazalus teesta (Teesta powdered oakblue)

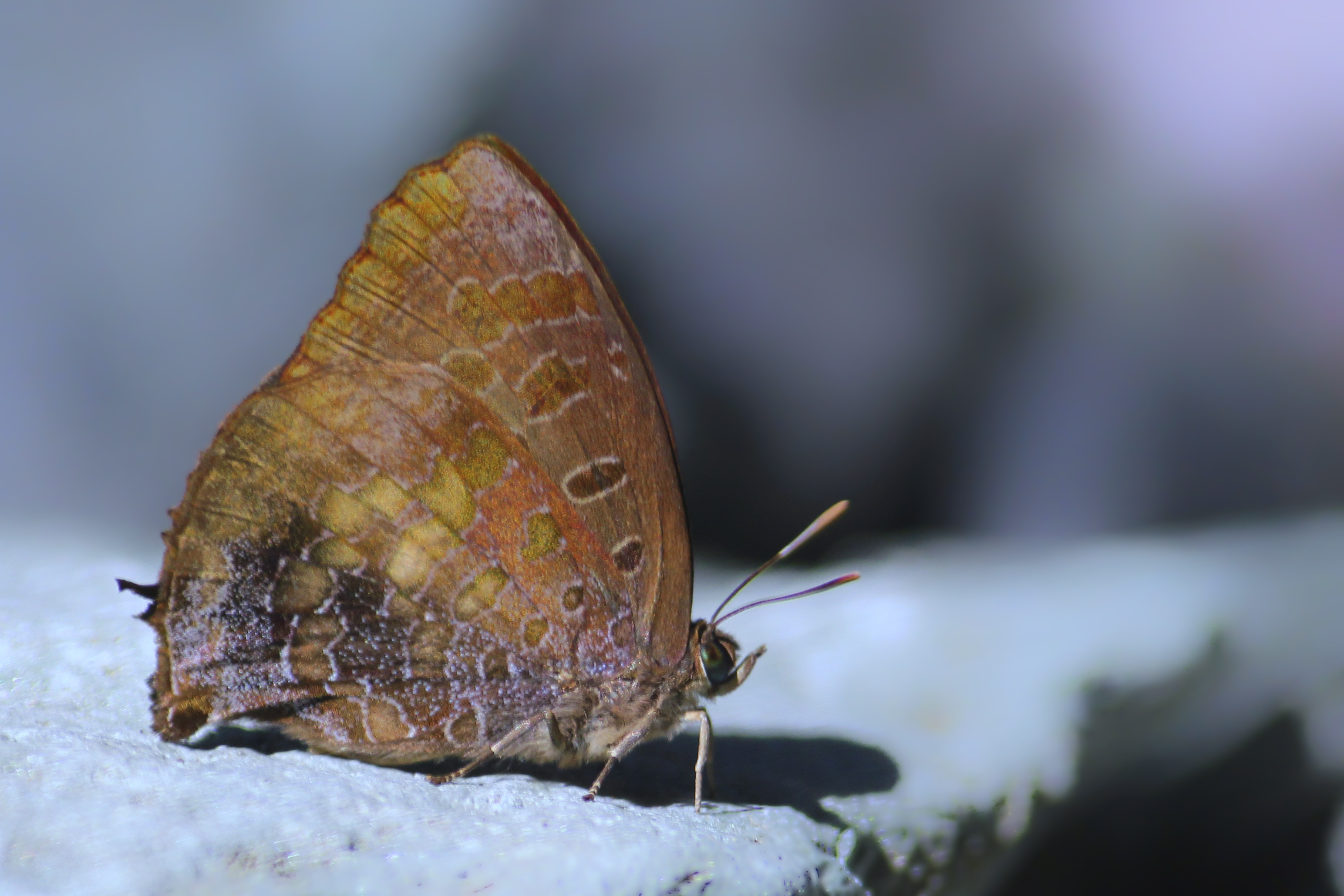
Ventral view

===== Species: Arhopala centaurus (centaur oakblue) =====
Subspecies: Arhopala centaurus pirithous (Bengal centaur oakblue)

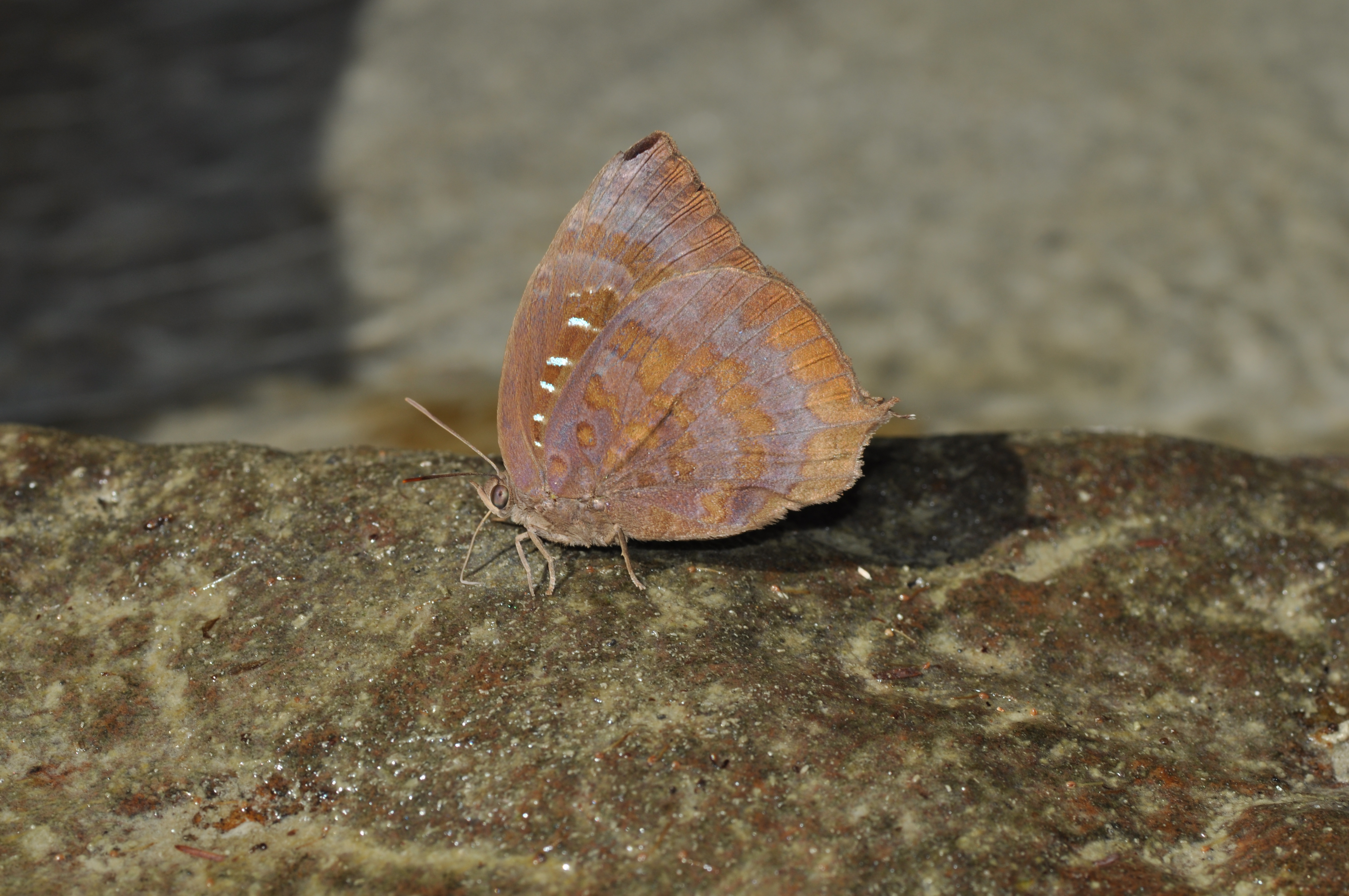
Ventral view

==== Genus: Flos ====
===== Species: Flos adriana (variegated plushblue) =====
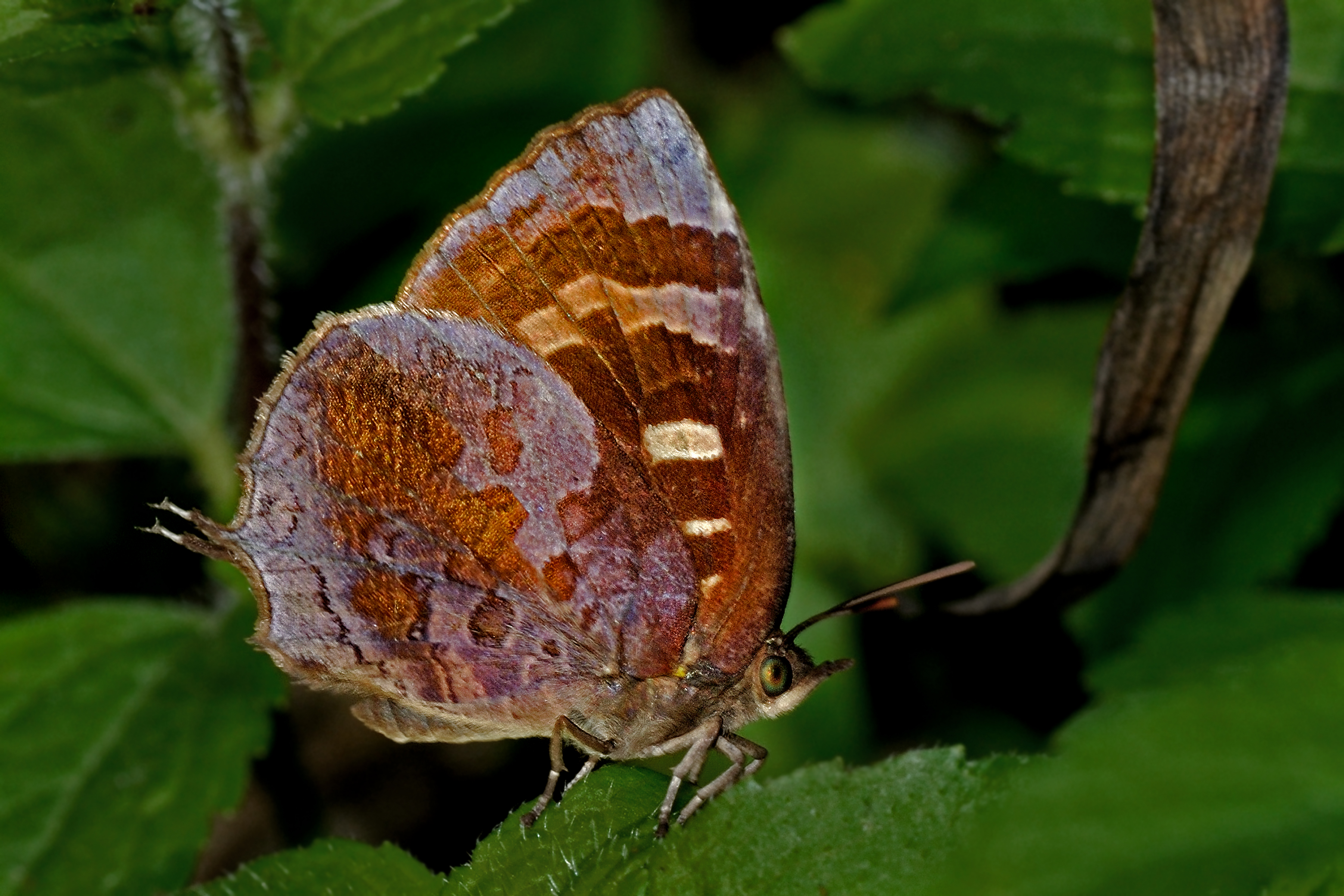
Ventral view

===== Species: Flos areste (tailless plushblue) =====
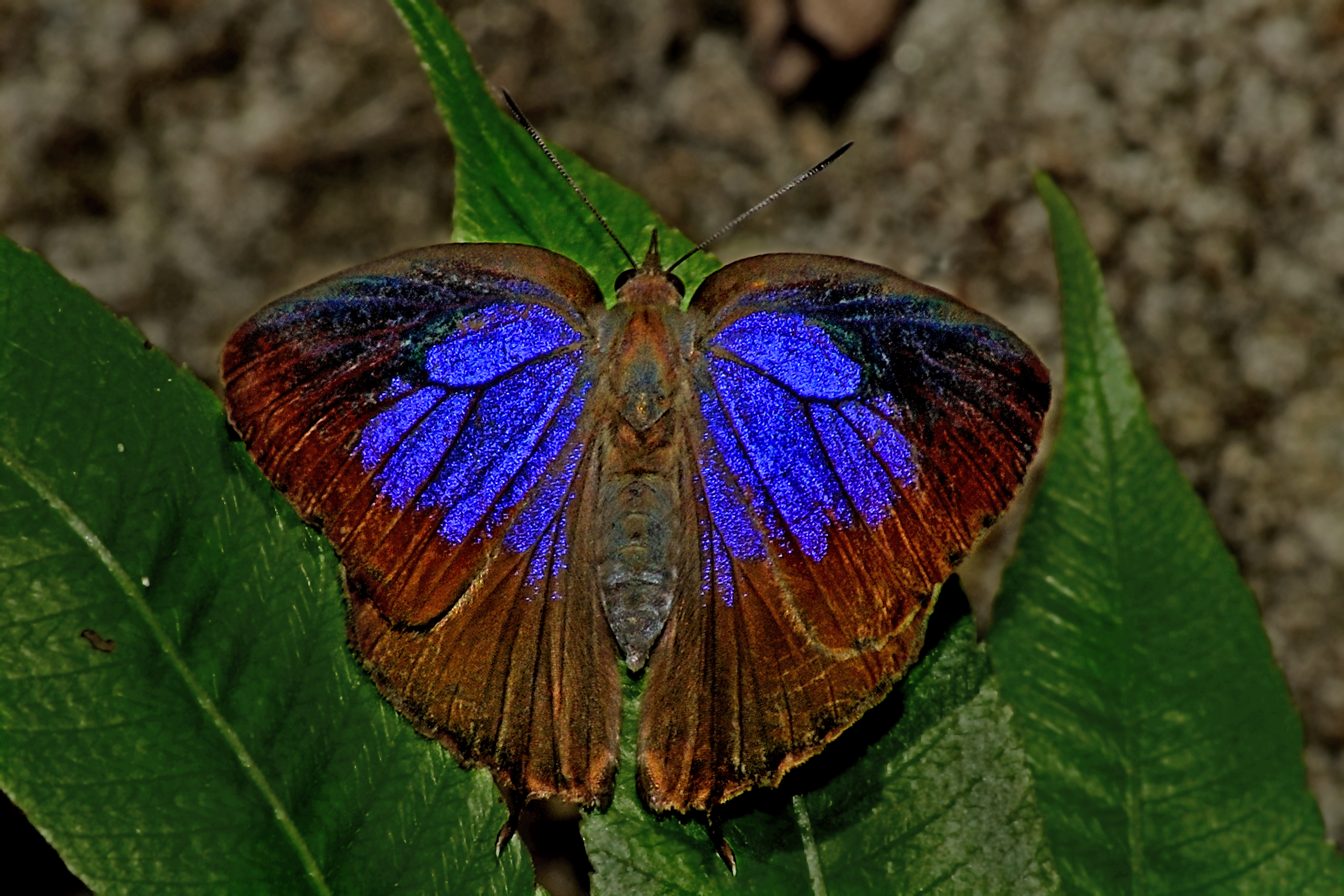
Dorsal view (female)

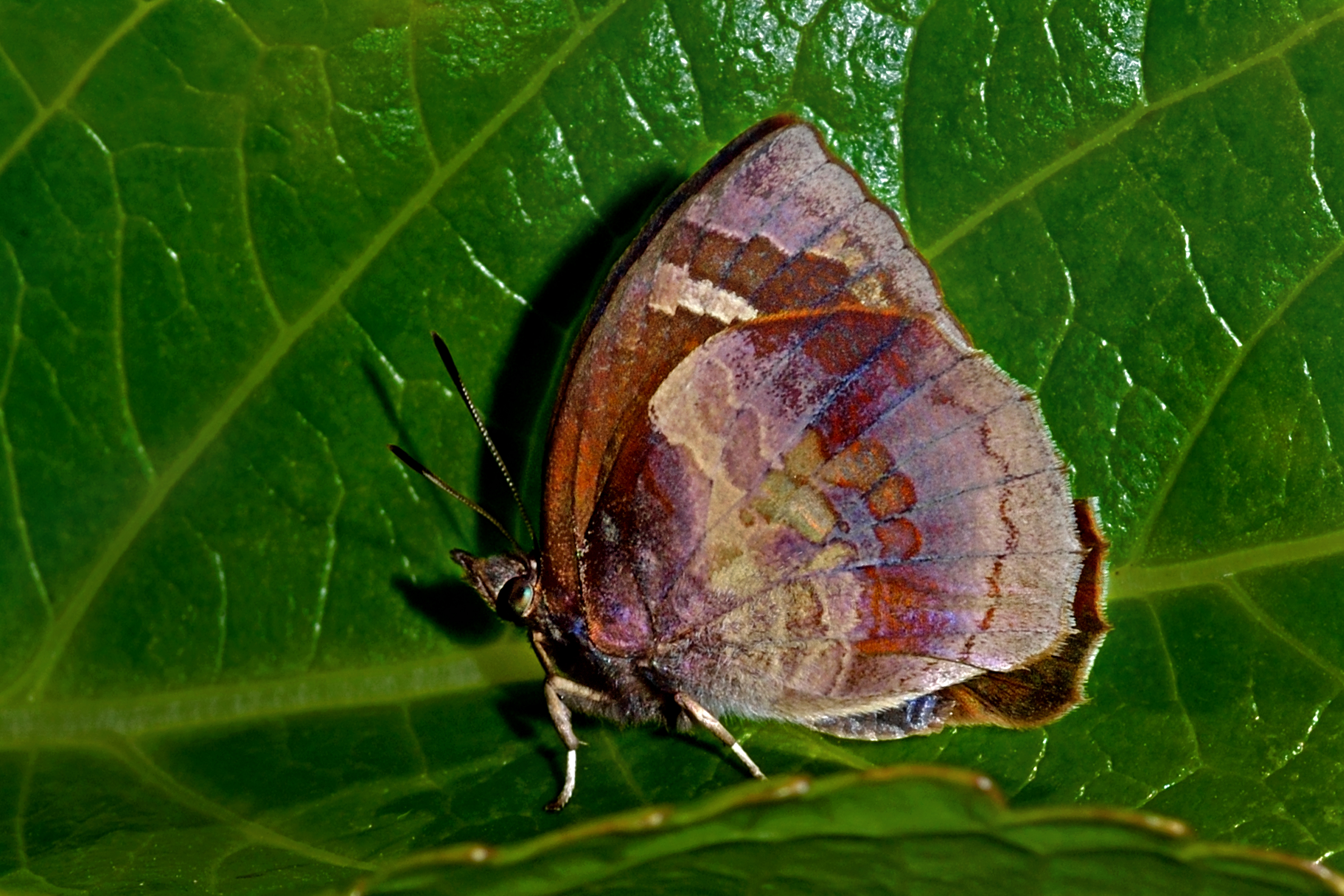
Ventral view (male)

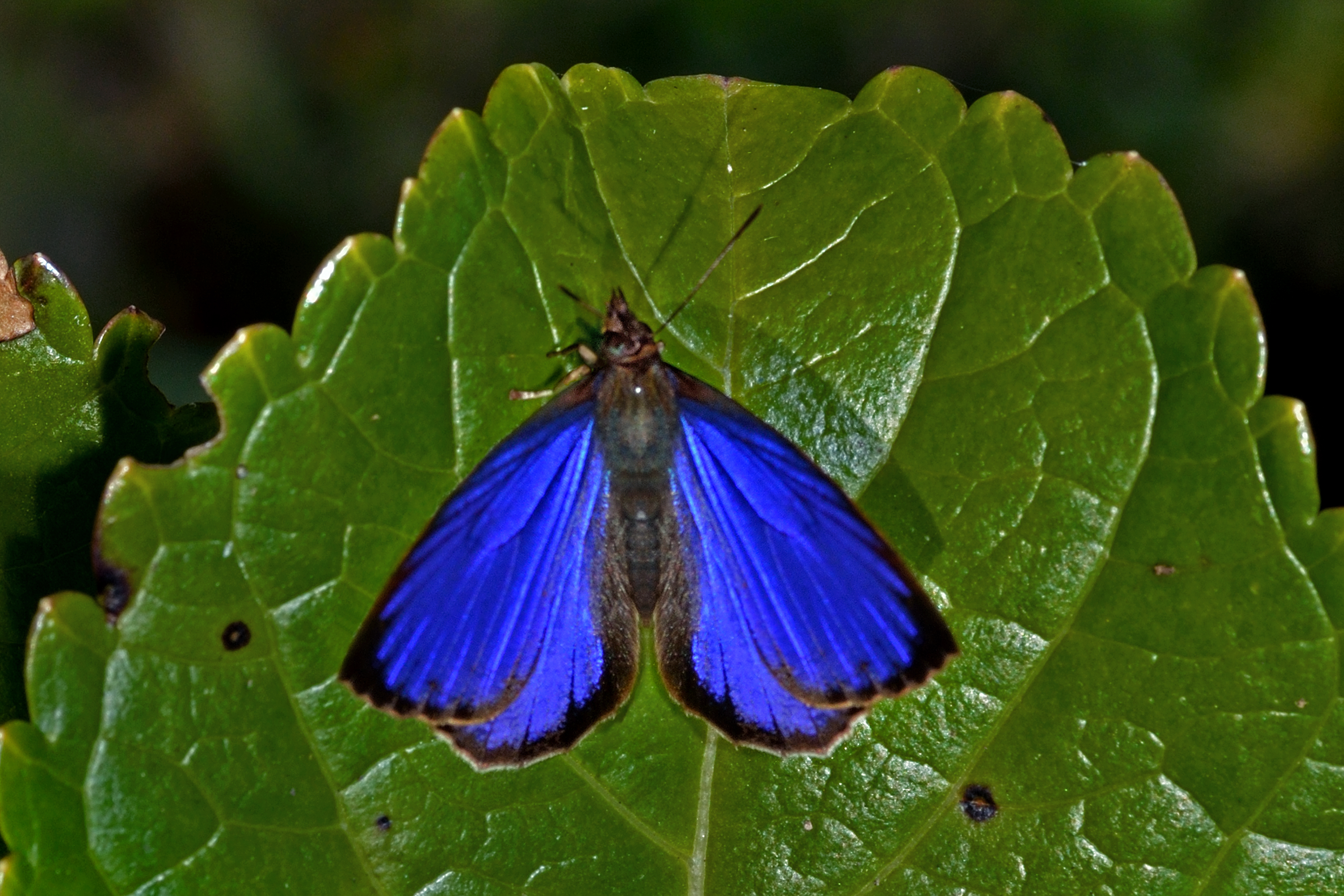
Dorsal view (male)

==== Genus: Surendra ====
===== Species: Surendra quercetorum (common acacia blue) =====
Subspecies: Surendra quercetorum quercetorum (Himalayan common acacia blue)

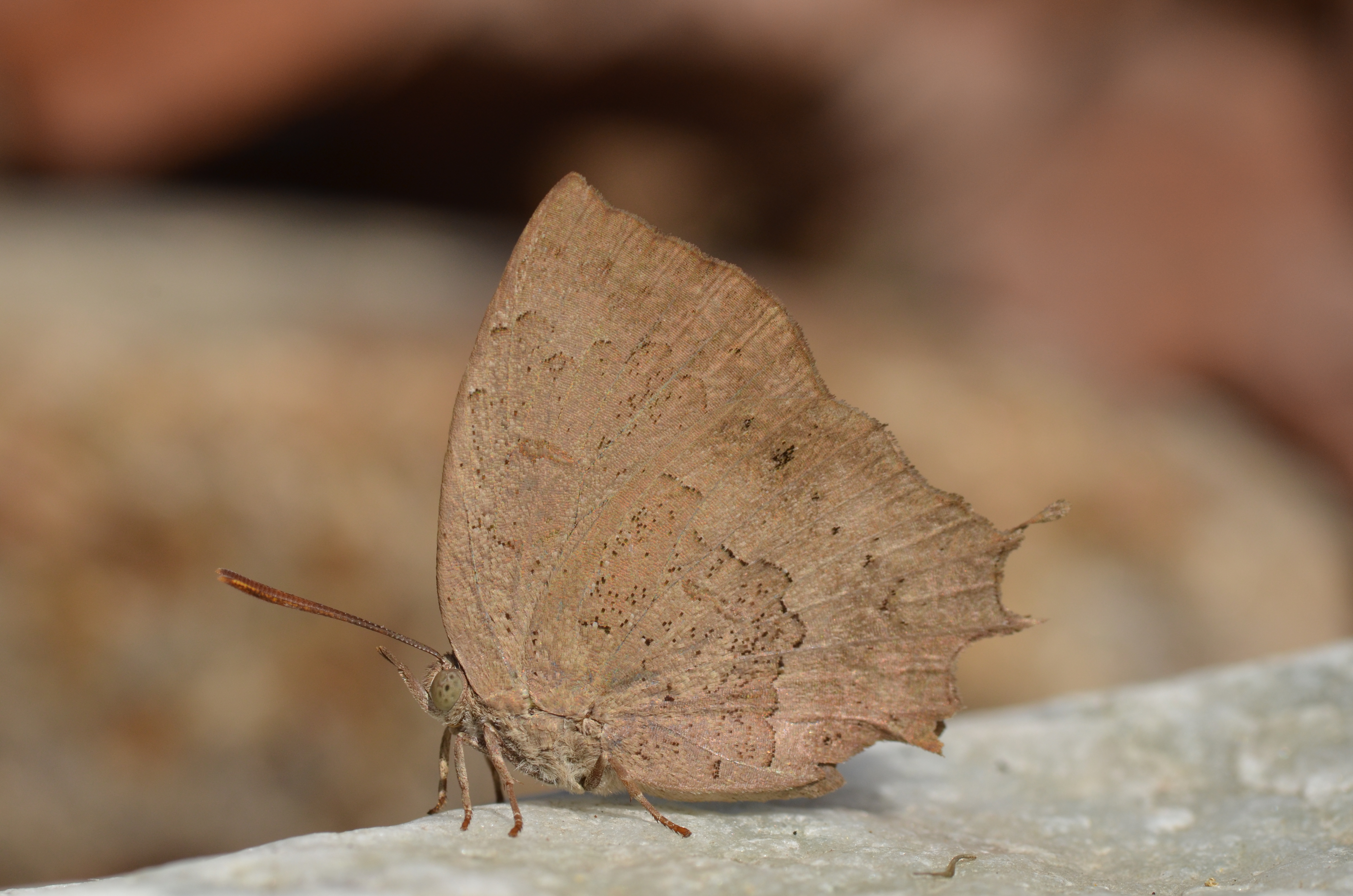
Ventral view

Tribe: Catapaecilmini

==== Genus: Catapaecilma ====
===== Species: Catapaecilma major (common tinsel) =====
Subspecies: Catapaecilma major major (Himalayan common tinsel)

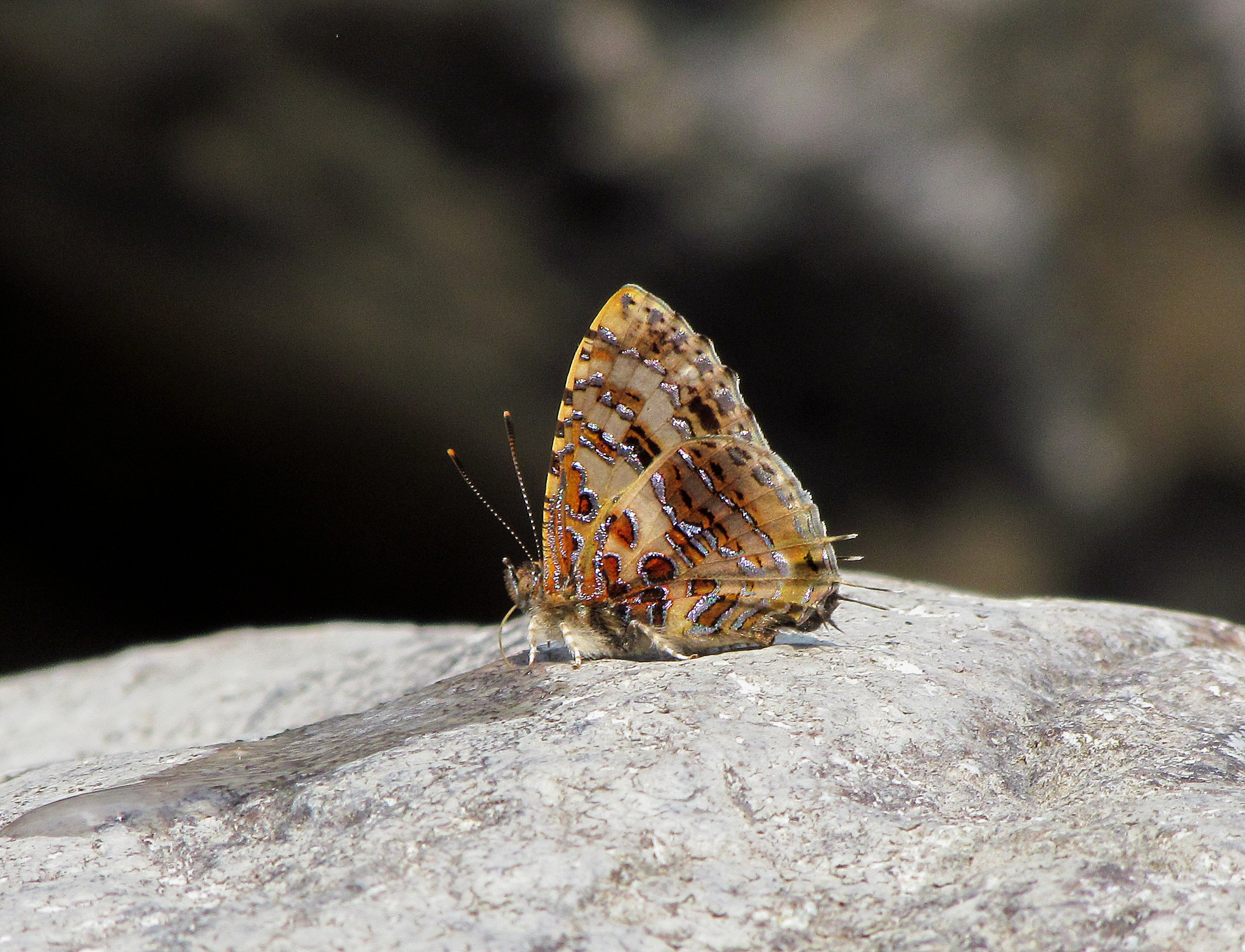
Ventral view

Tribe: Cheritrini

==== Genus: Cheritra ====
===== Species: Cheritra freja (common imperial) =====
Subspecies: Cheritra freja evansi (Khasi common imperial)

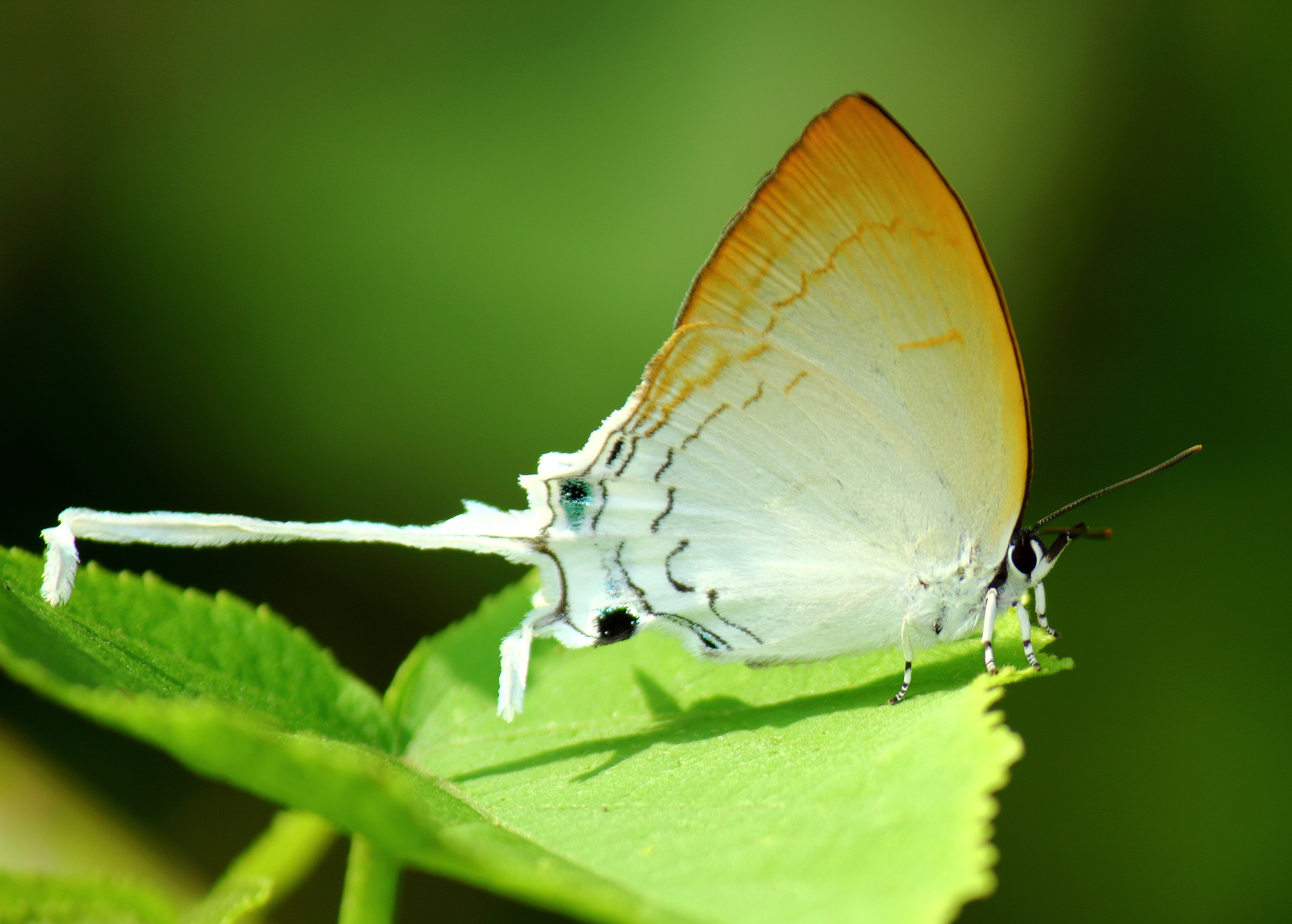
Ventral view

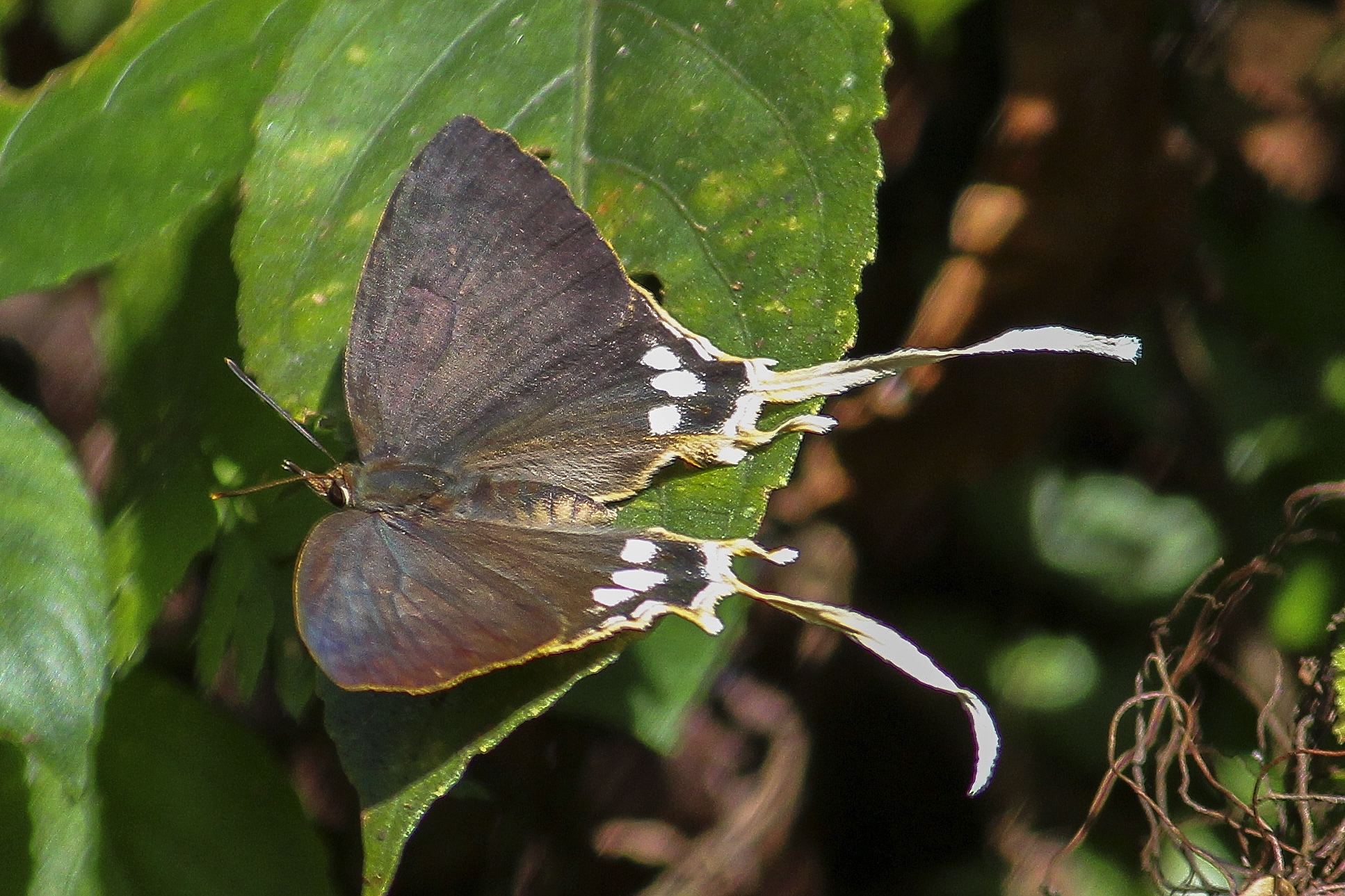
Dorsal view

==== Genus: Ticherra ====
===== Species: Ticherra acte (blue imperial) =====
Subspecies: Ticherra acte acte (Himalayan blue imperial)

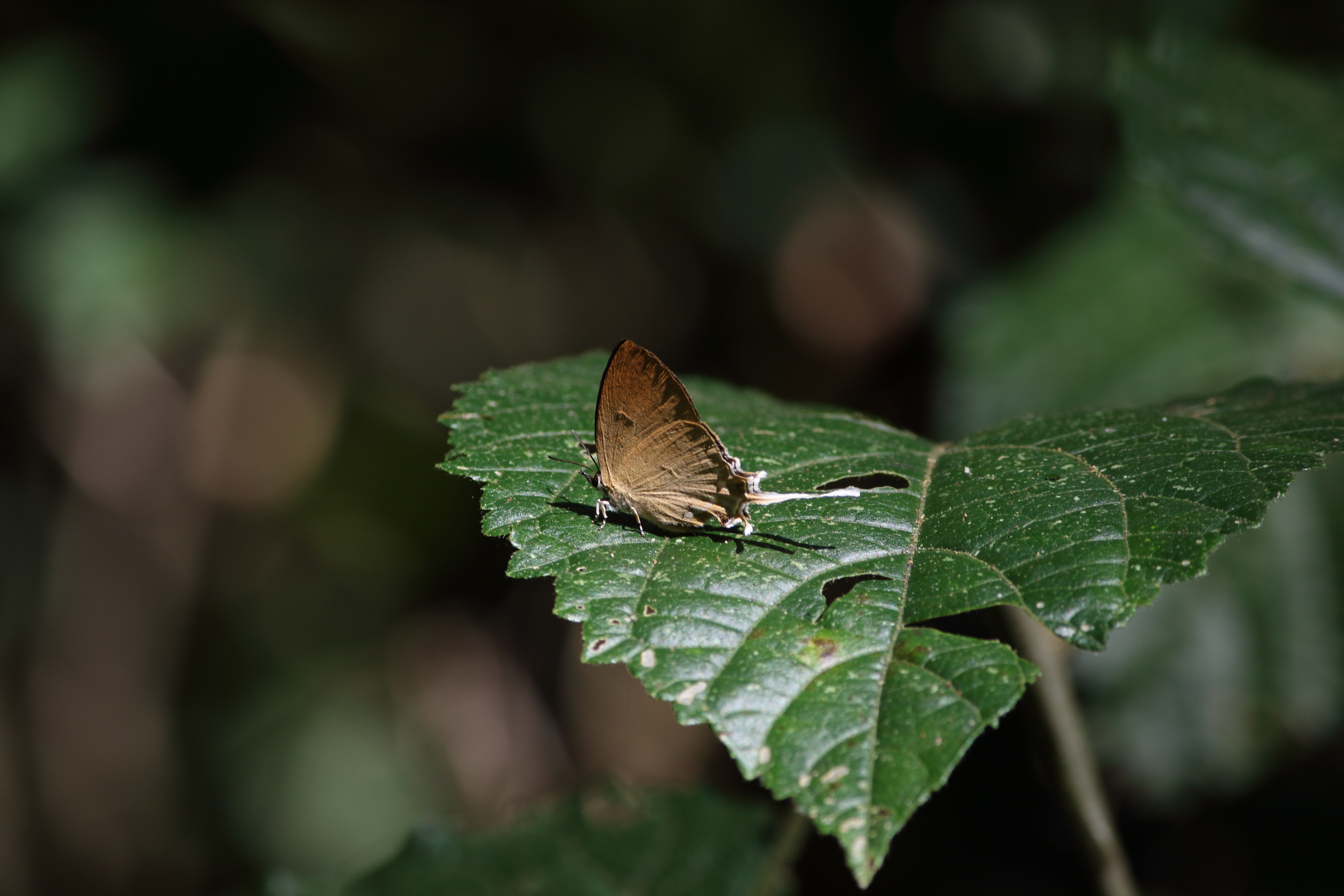
Ventral view

Tribe: Deudorigini

==== Genus: Rapala ====
===== Species: Rapala iarbus (common red flash) =====
Subspecies: Rapala iarbus iarbus (Oriental red flash)

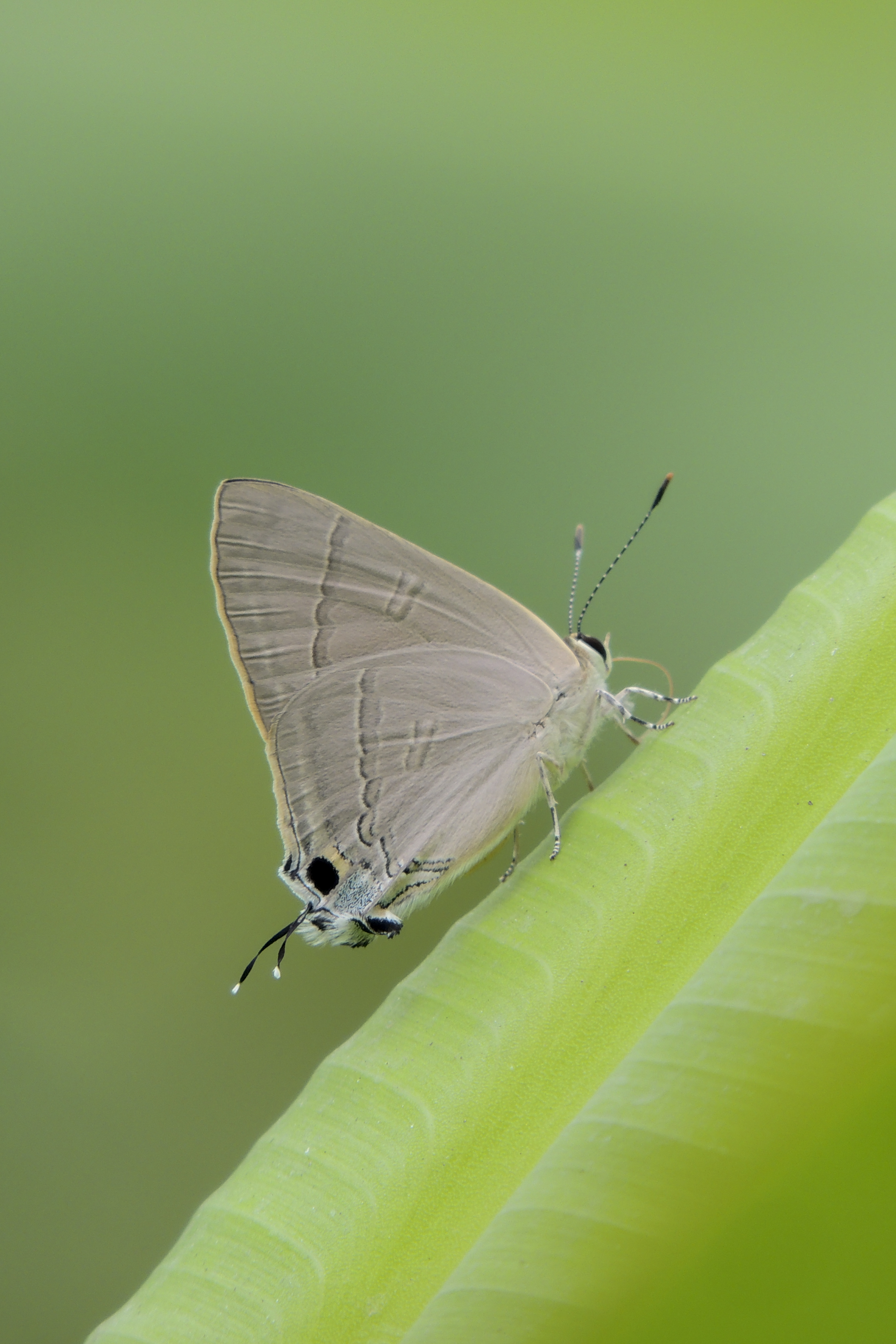
Ventral view

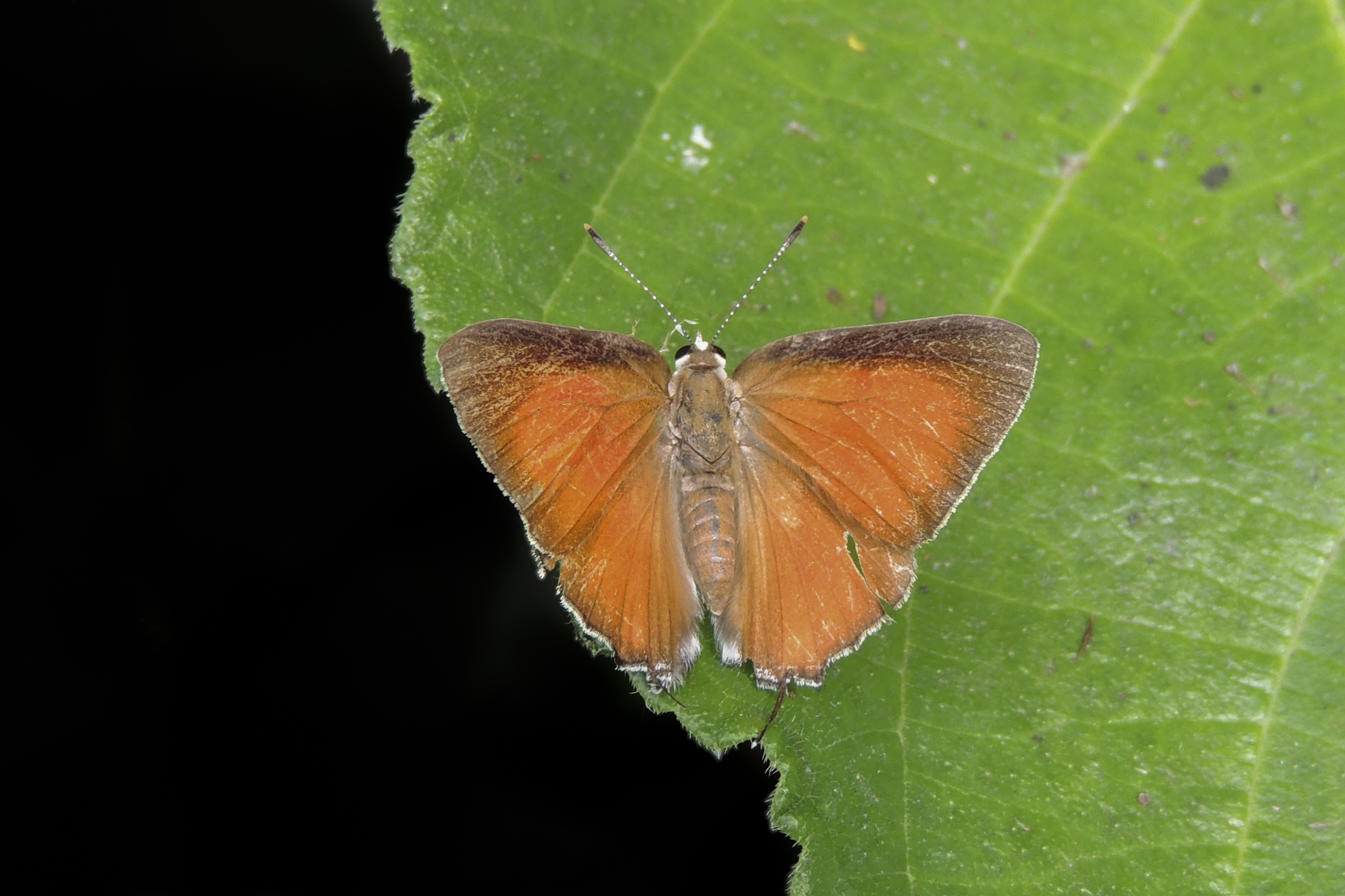
Dorsal view

===== Species: Rapala pheretima (copper flash) =====
Subspecies: Rapala pheretima petosiris (Indian copper flash)

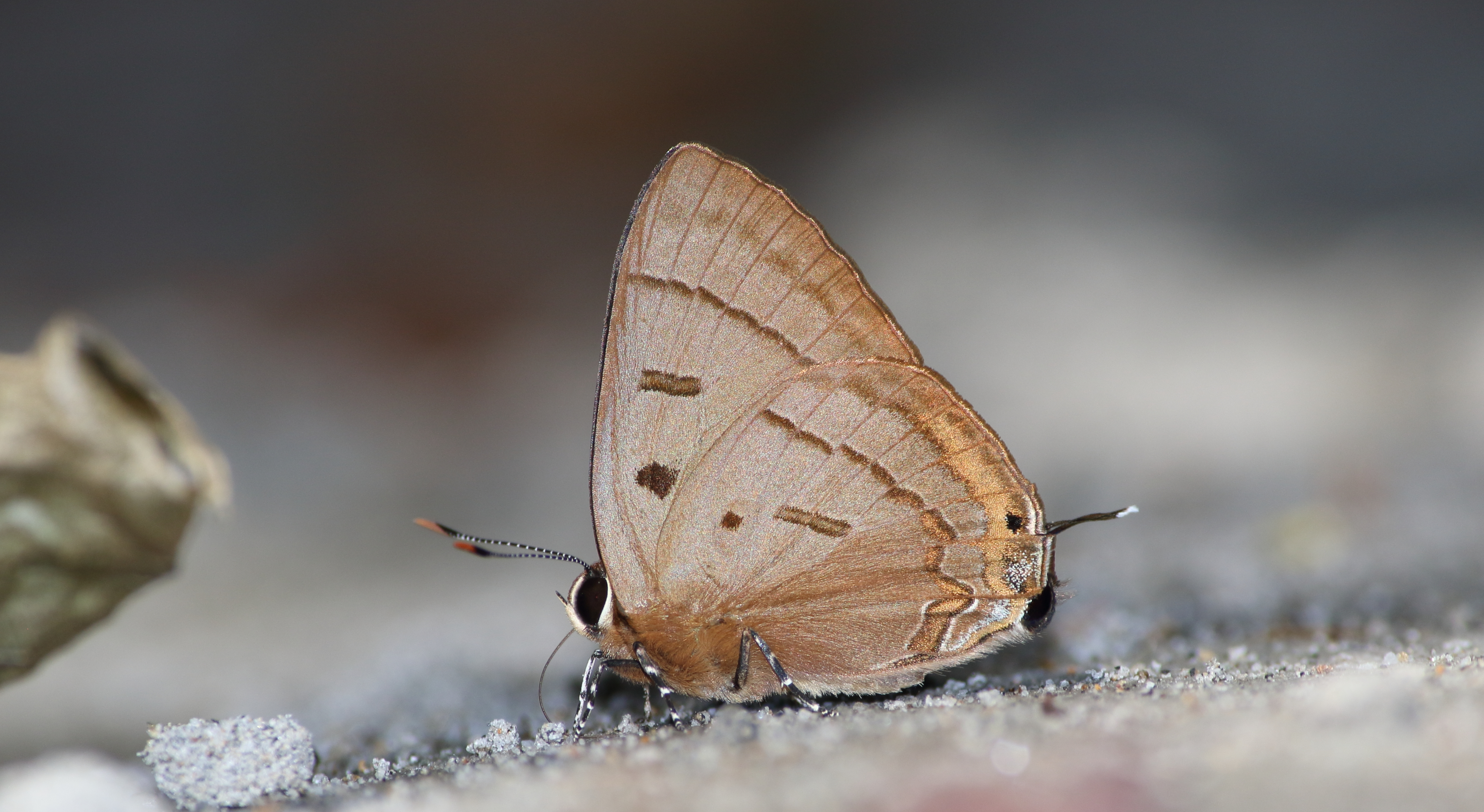
Ventral view

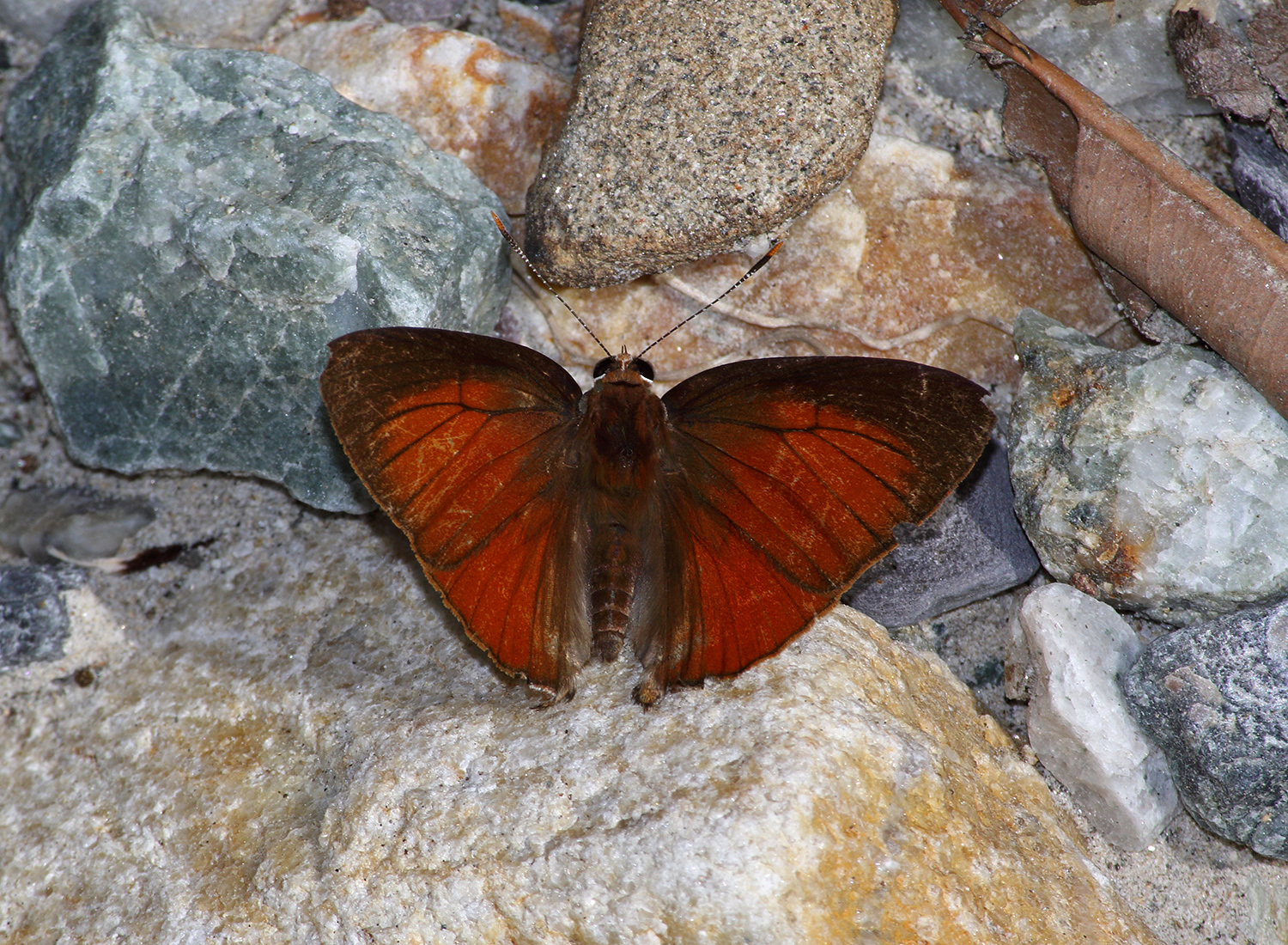
Dorsal view

==== Genus: Virachola ====
===== Species: Virachola perse (large guava blue) =====
Subspecies: Virachola perse perse (Himalayan large guava blue)

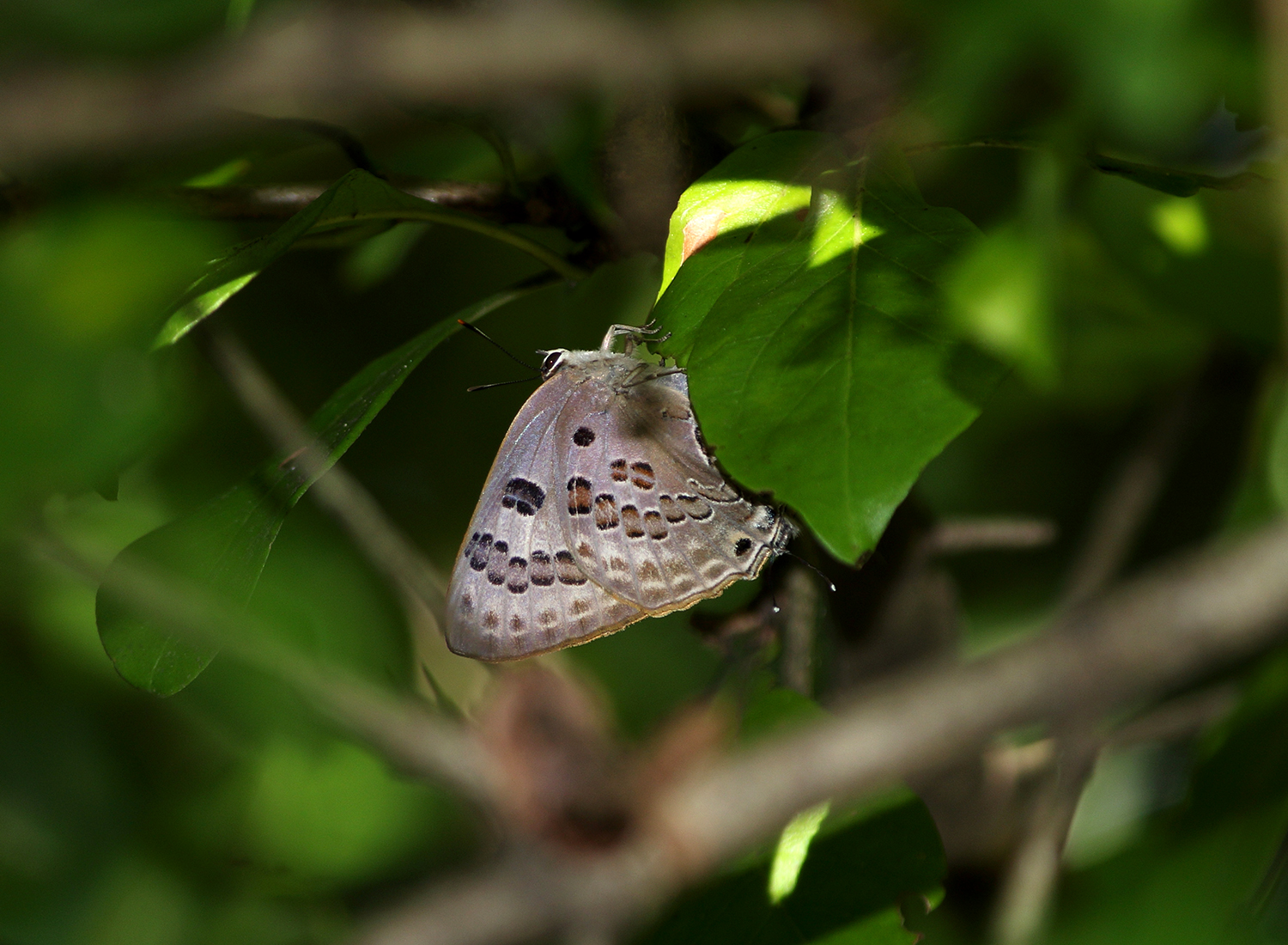
Ventral view

Tribe: Iolaini

==== Genus: Creon ====
===== Species: Creon cleobis (broad-tail royal) =====
Subspecies: Creon cleobis cleobis (Bengal broad-tail royal)

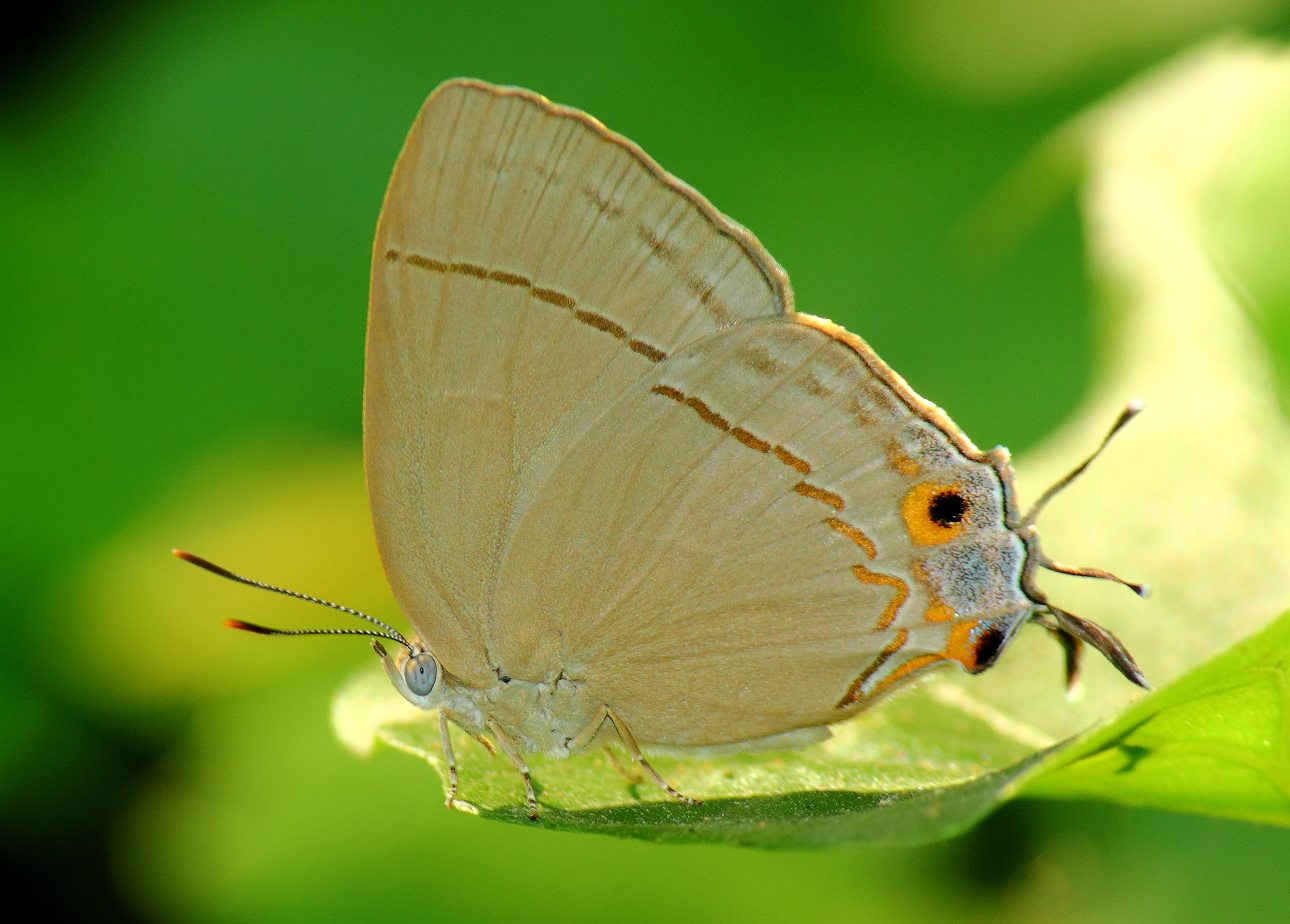
Ventral view

Tribe: Horagini

==== Genus: Horaga ====
===== Species: Horaga onyx (common onyx) =====
Subspecies: Horaga onyx onyx (variable common onyx)

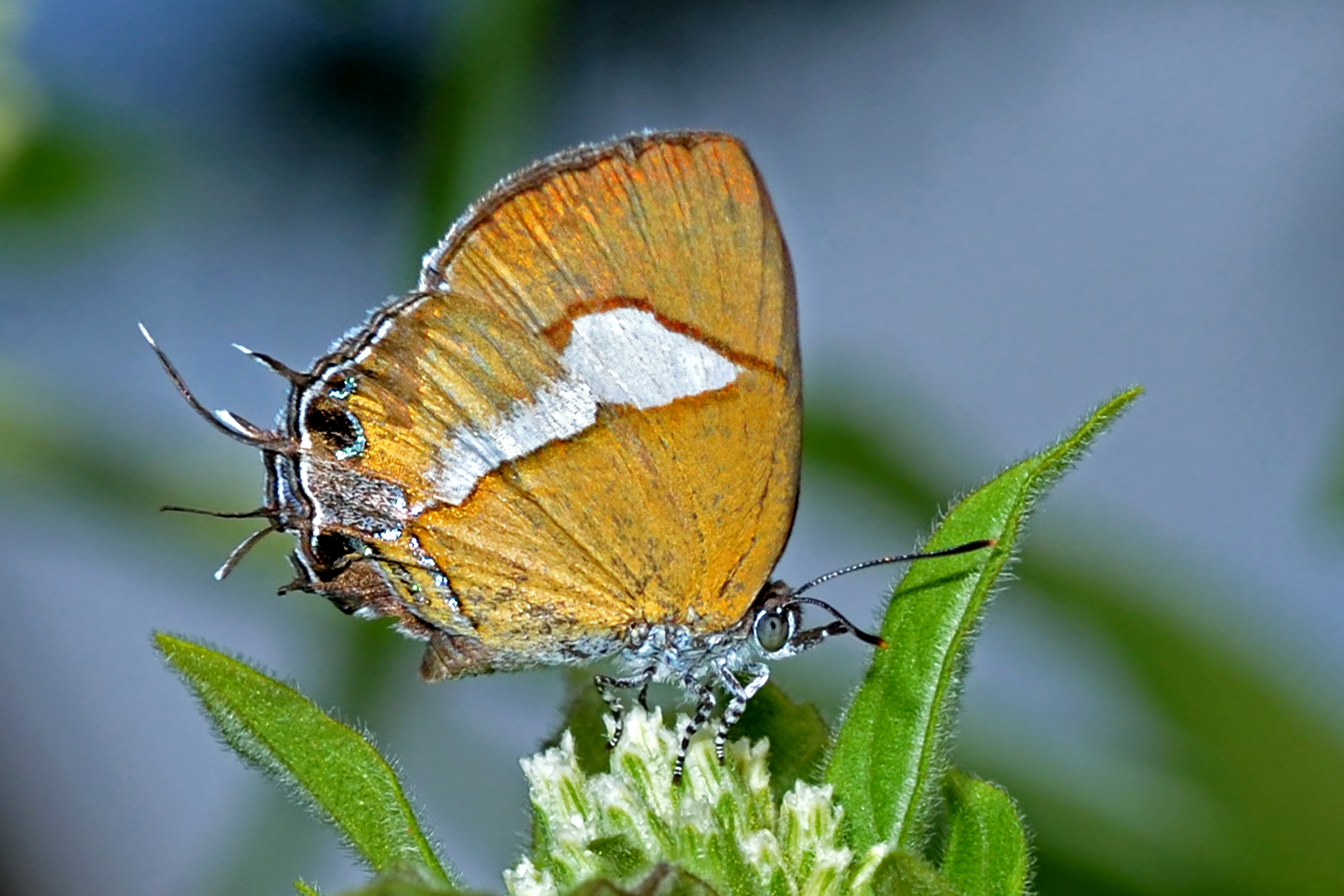
Ventral view

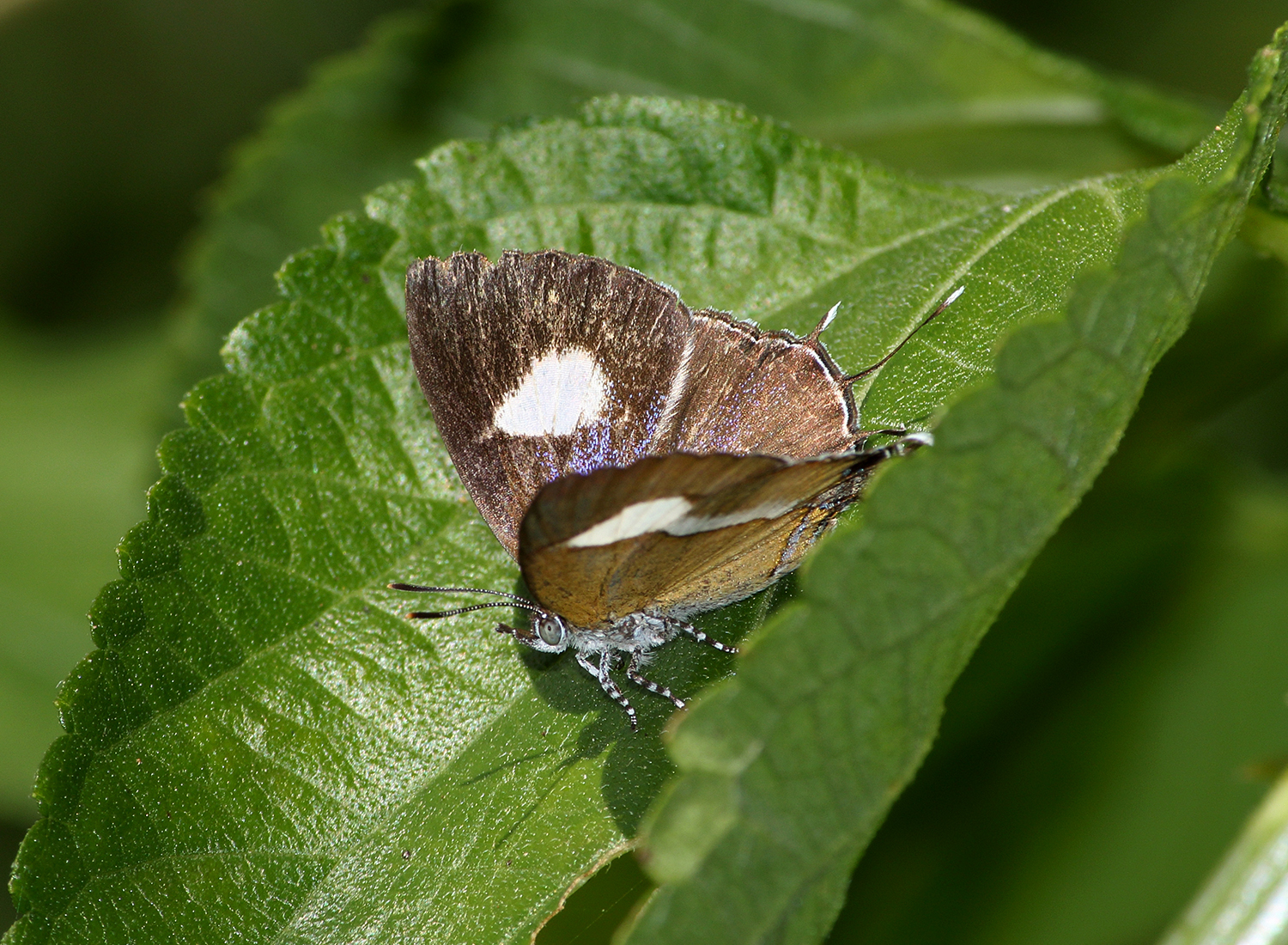
Dorsal view

==== Genus: Rathinda ====
===== Species: Rathinda amor (monkey puzzle) =====
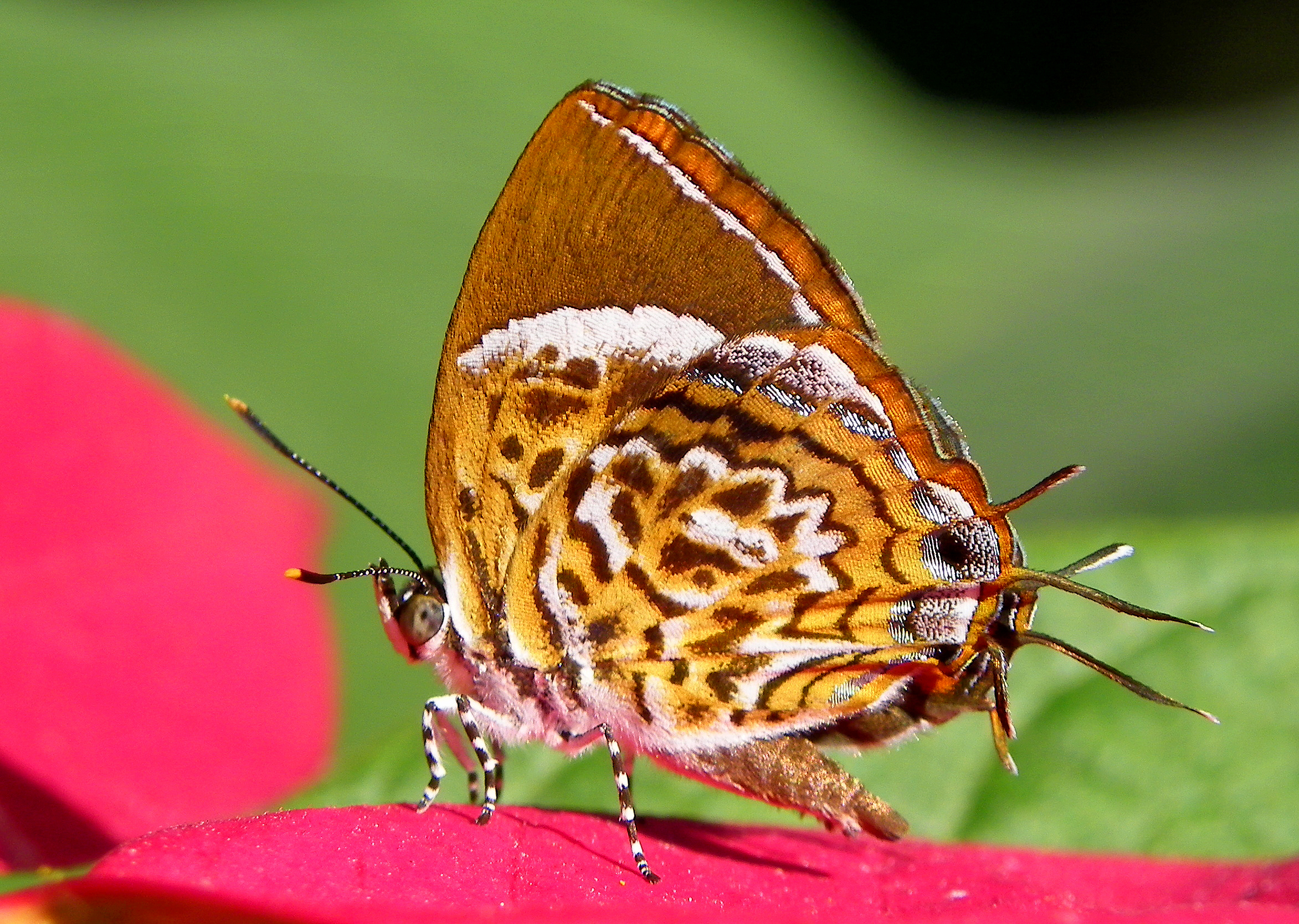
Ventral view

Tribe: Hypolycaenini

==== Genus: Hypolycaena ====
===== Species: Hypolycaena erylus (common tit) =====
Subspecies: Hypolycaena erylus himavantus (Sikkim common tit)

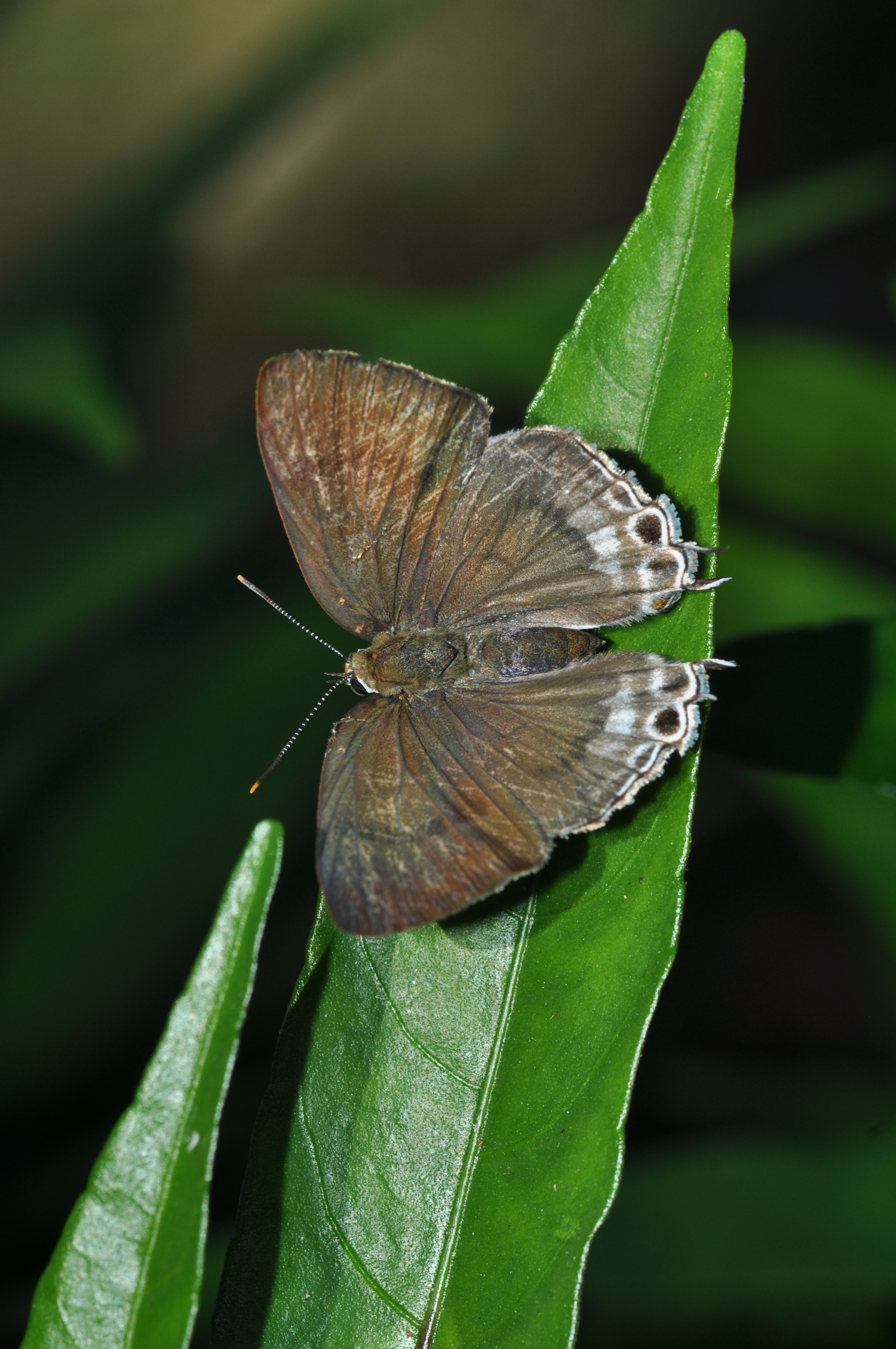
Dorsal view (female)

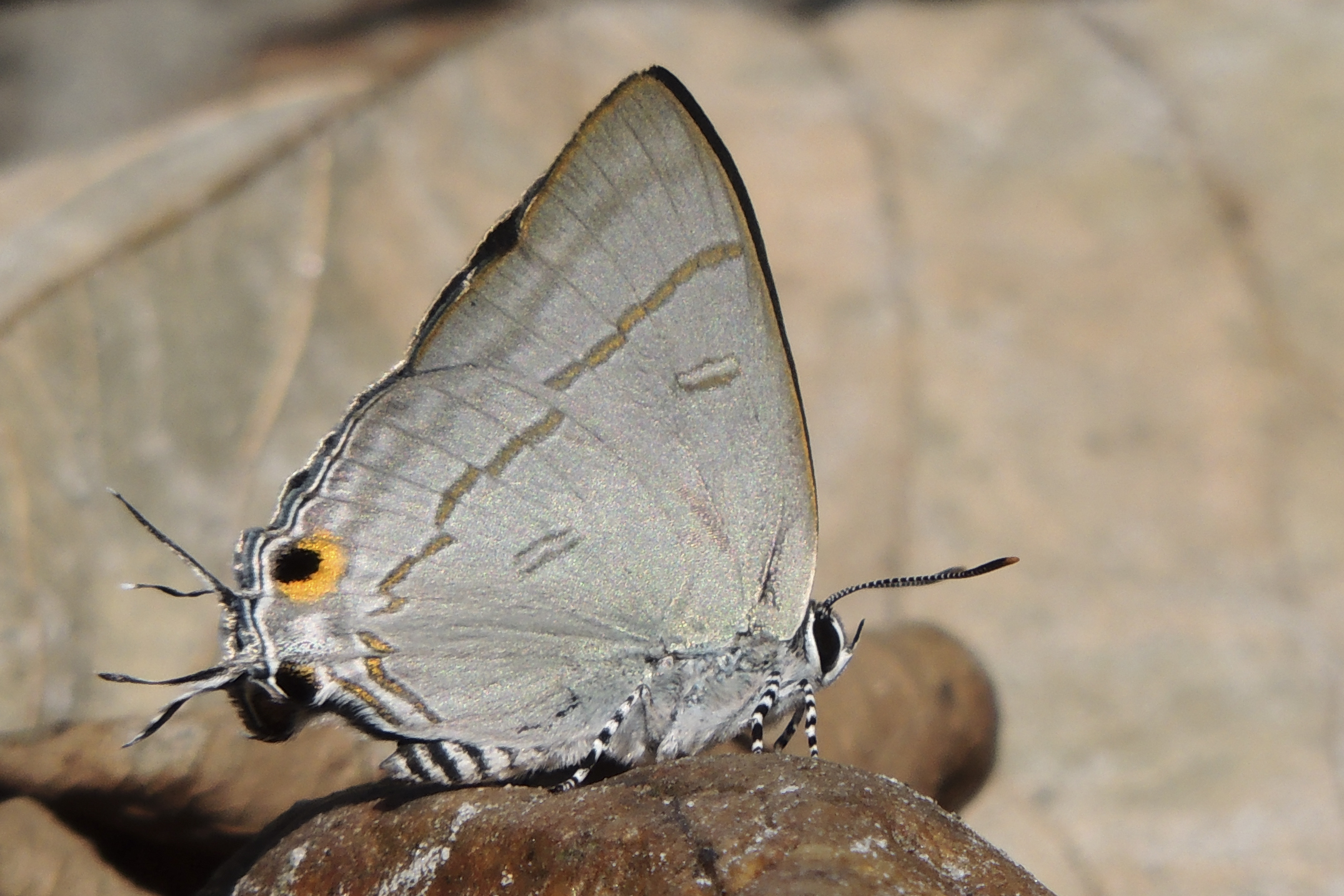
Ventral view (male)

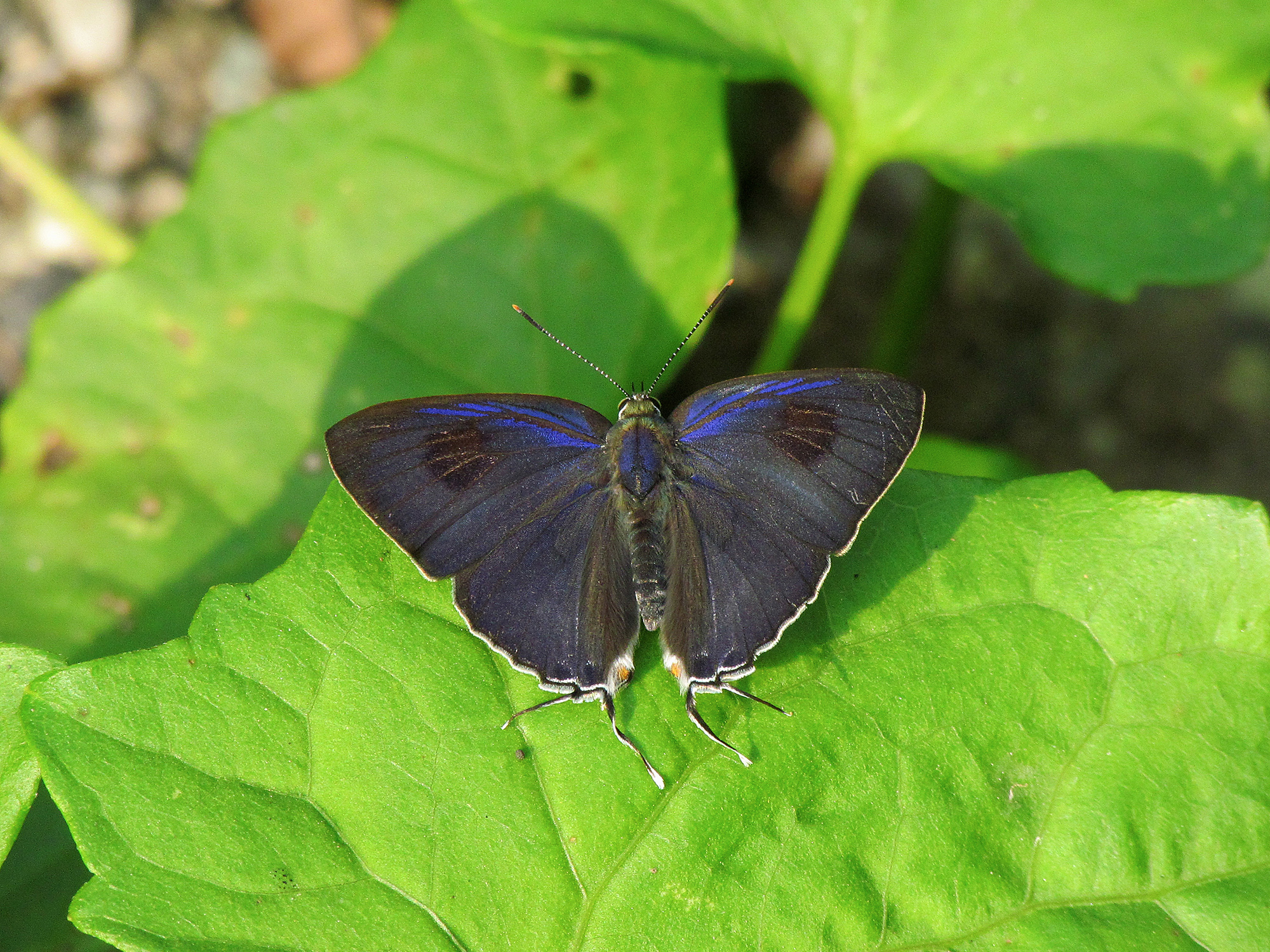
Dorsal view (male)

===== Species: Hypolycaena othona (orchid tit) =====
Subspecies: Hypolycaena othona othona (Oriental orchid tit)

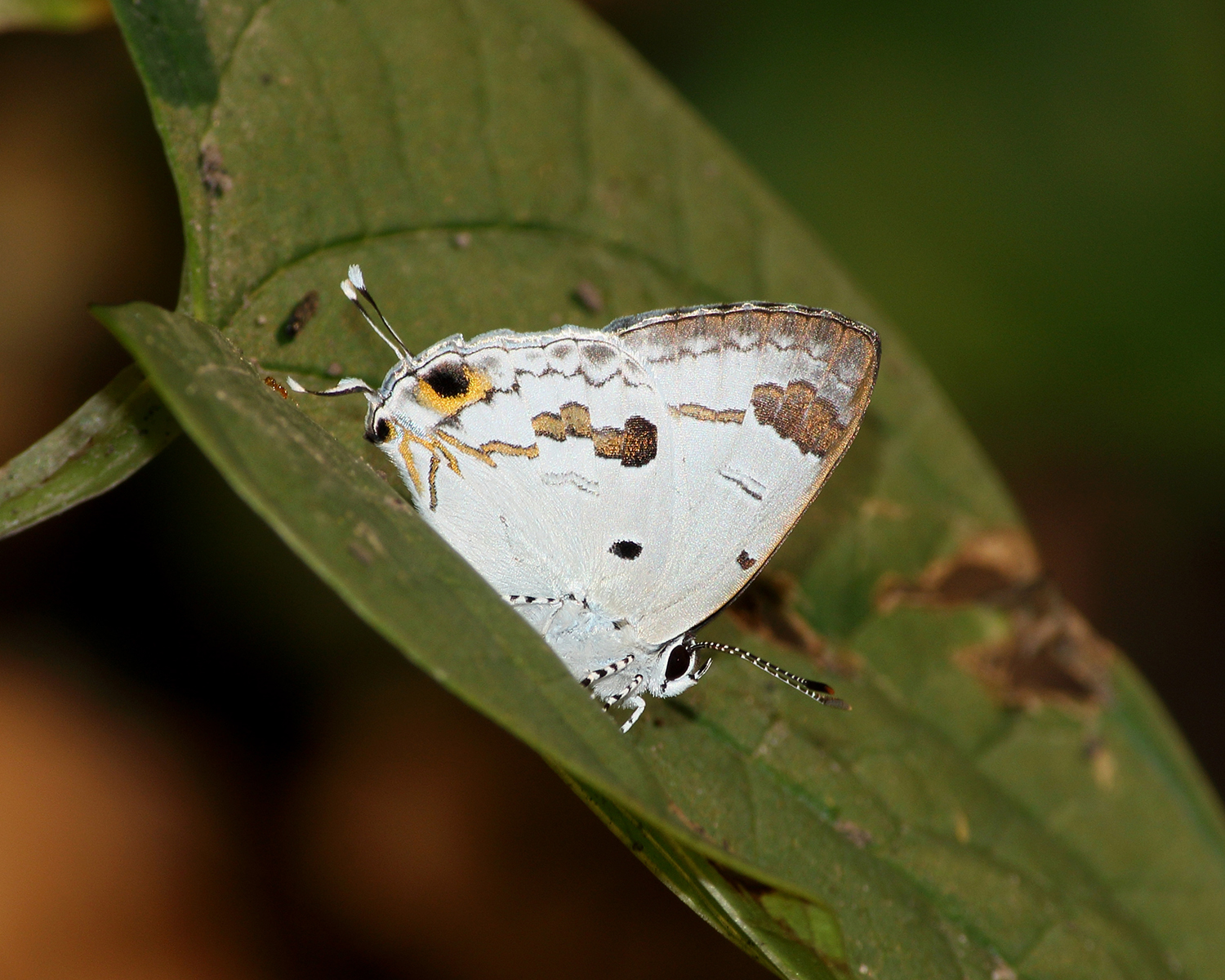
Ventral view

==== Genus: Zeltus ====
===== Species: Zeltus amasa (fluffy tit) =====
Subspecies: Zeltus amasa amasa (Indian fluffy tit)

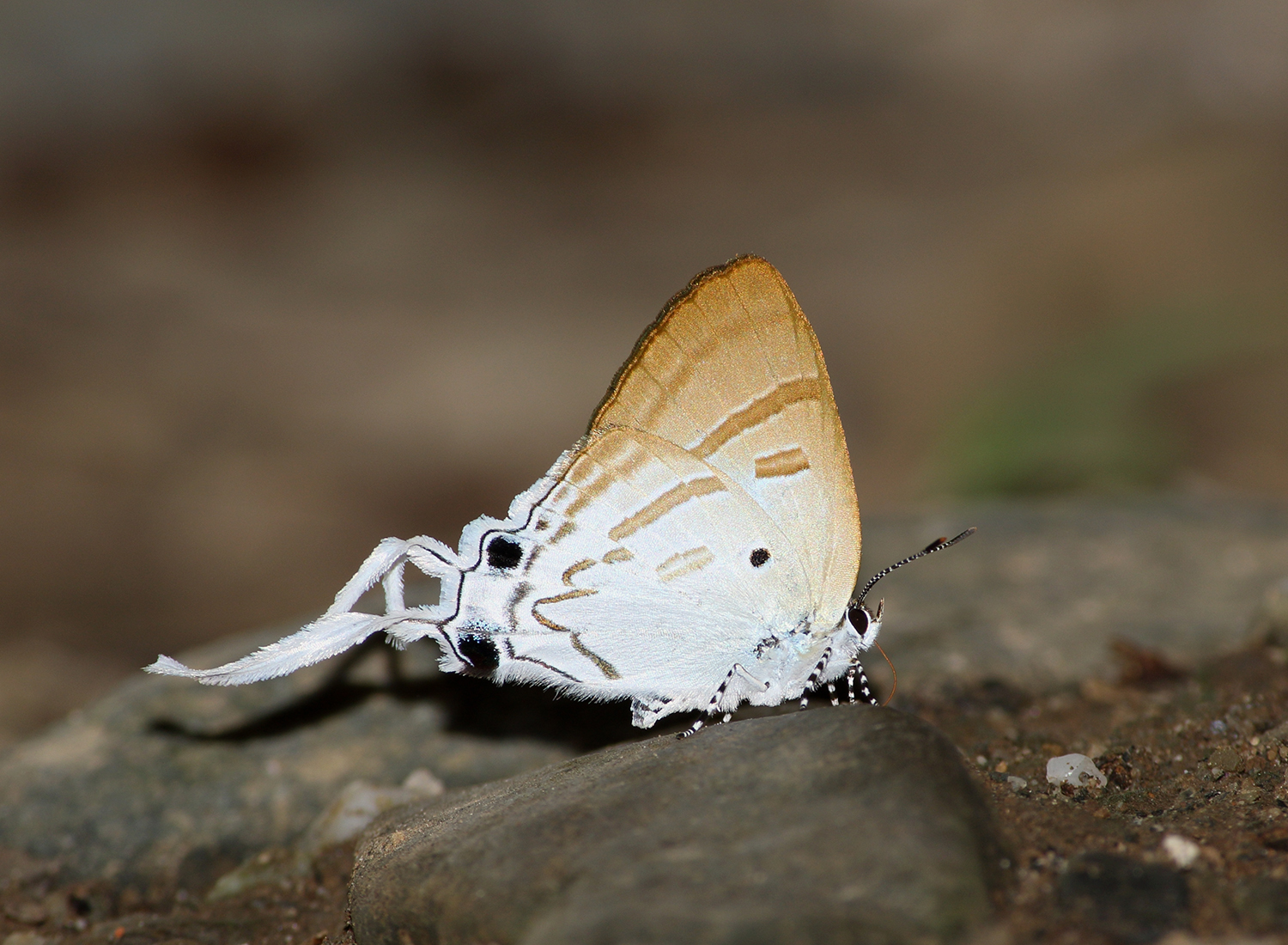
Ventral view

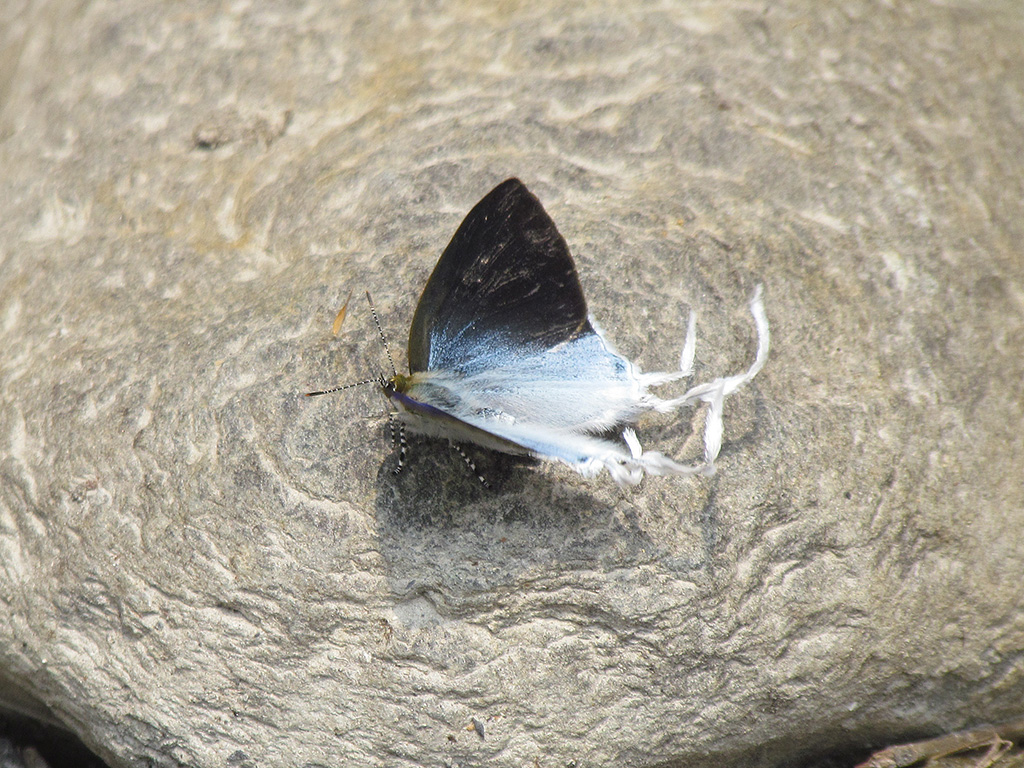
Dorsal view

Tribe: Remelanini

==== Genus: Ancema ====
===== Species: Ancema blanka (silver royal) =====
Subspecies: Ancema blanka minturna (blue-streaked silver royal)

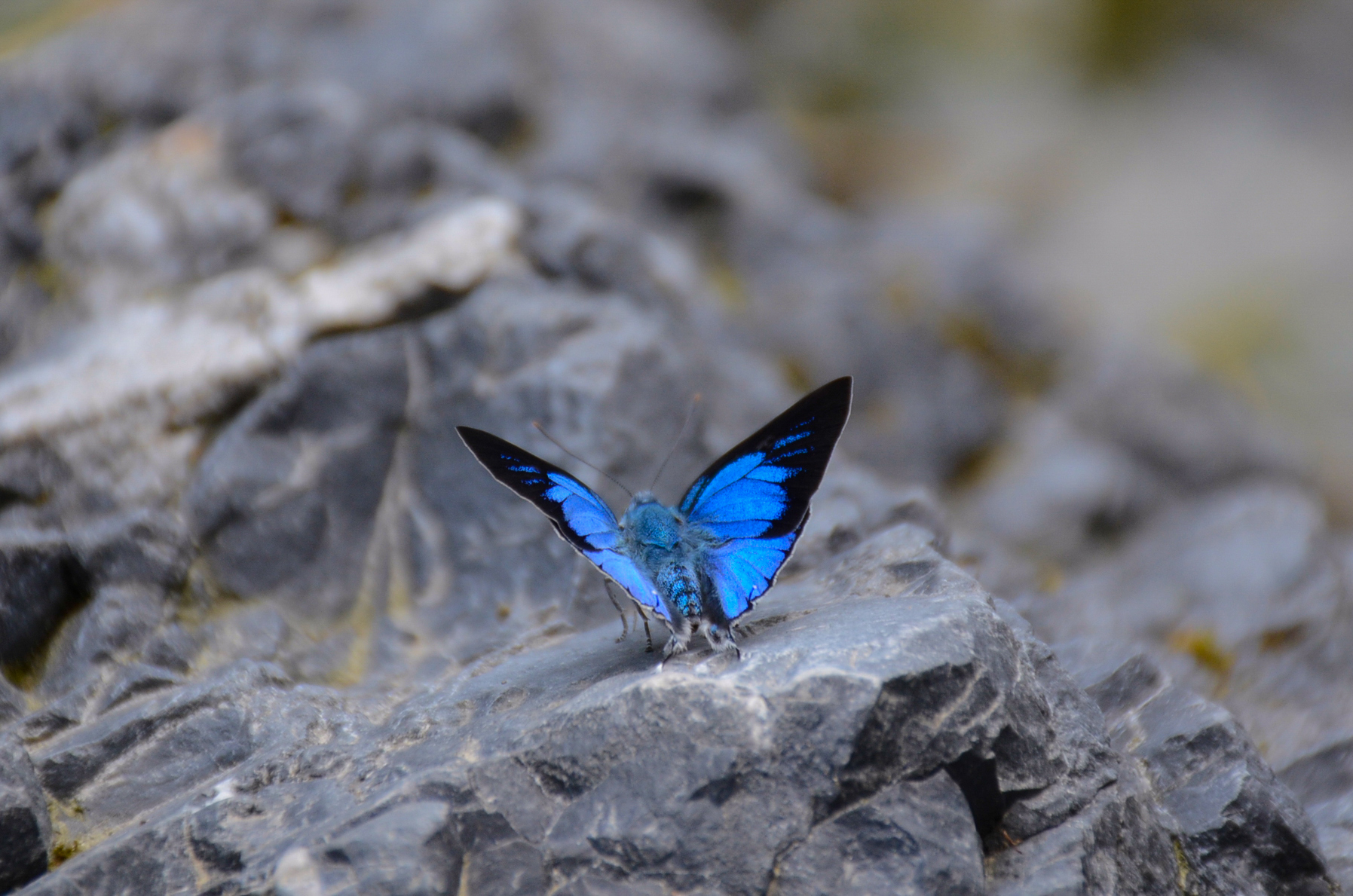
Dorsal view (male)

==== Genus: Remelana ====
===== Species: Remelana jangala (chocolate royal) =====
Subspecies: Remelana jangala ravata (northern chocolate royal)

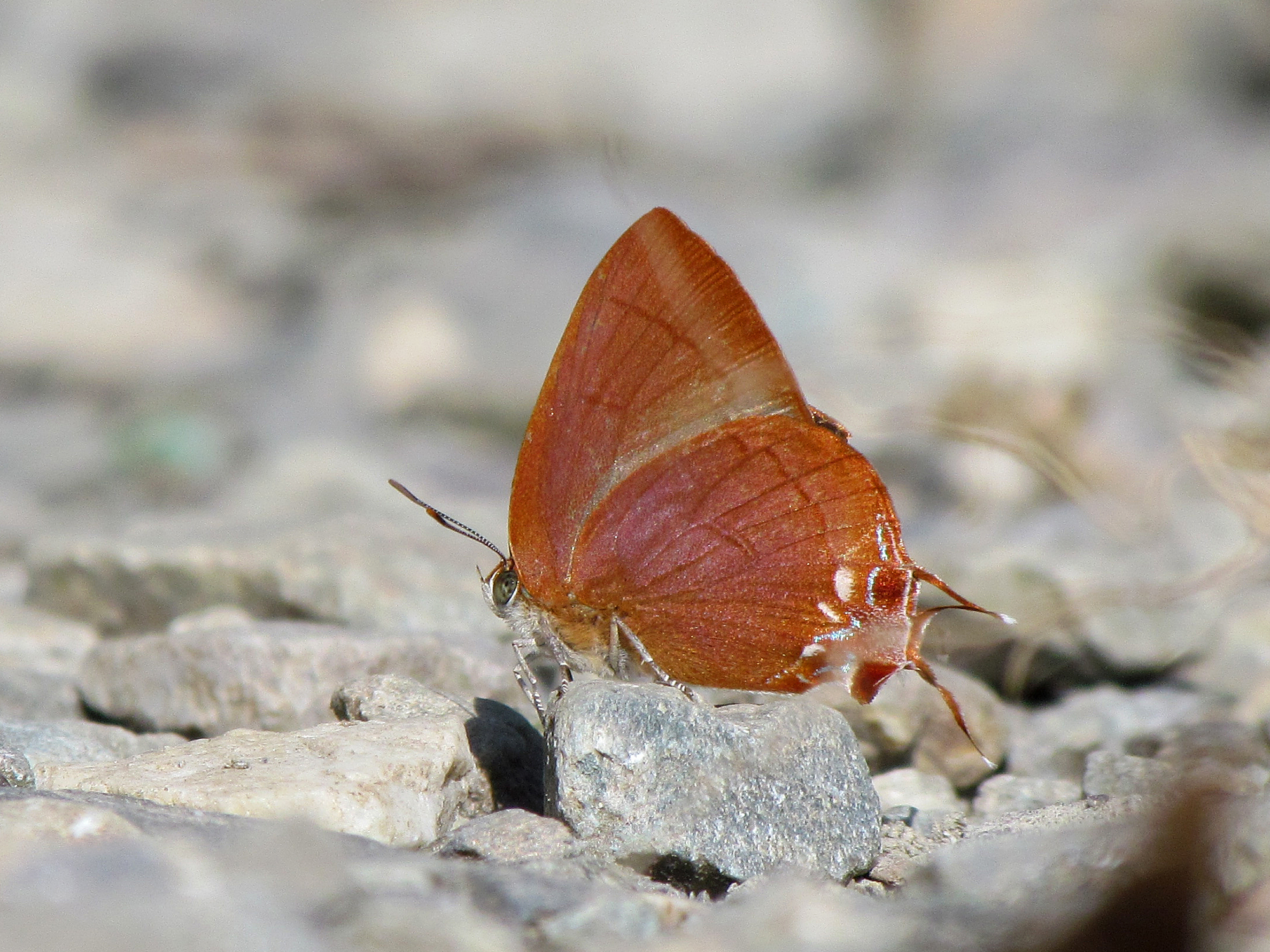
Ventral view

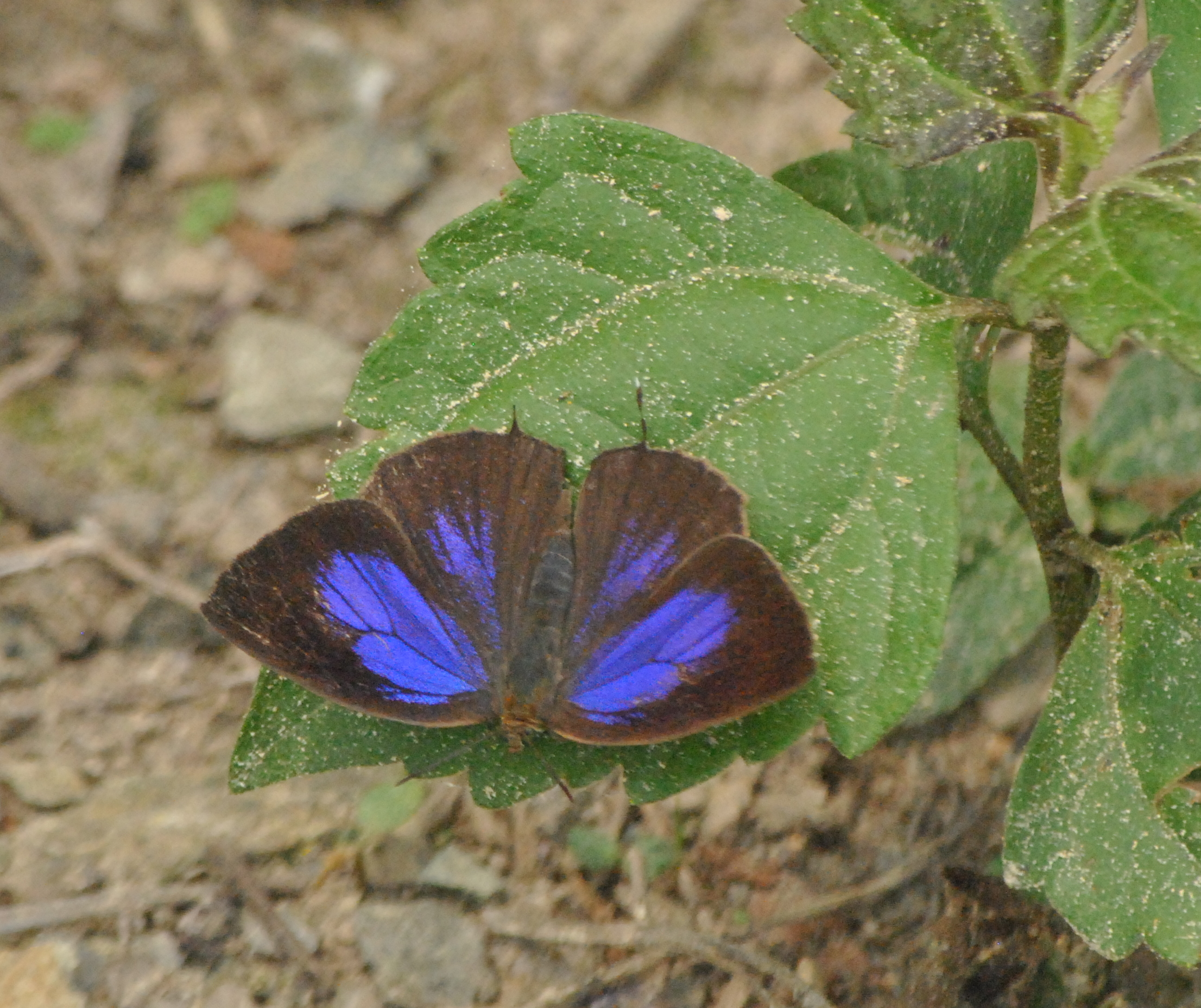
Dorsal view

== Family: Riodinidae ==
=== Subfamily: Nemeobiinae ===
Tribe: Abisarini

==== Genus: Abisara ====
===== Species: Abisara bifasciata (double-banded Judy) =====
Subspecies: Abisara bifasciata angulata (angled double-banded Judy)

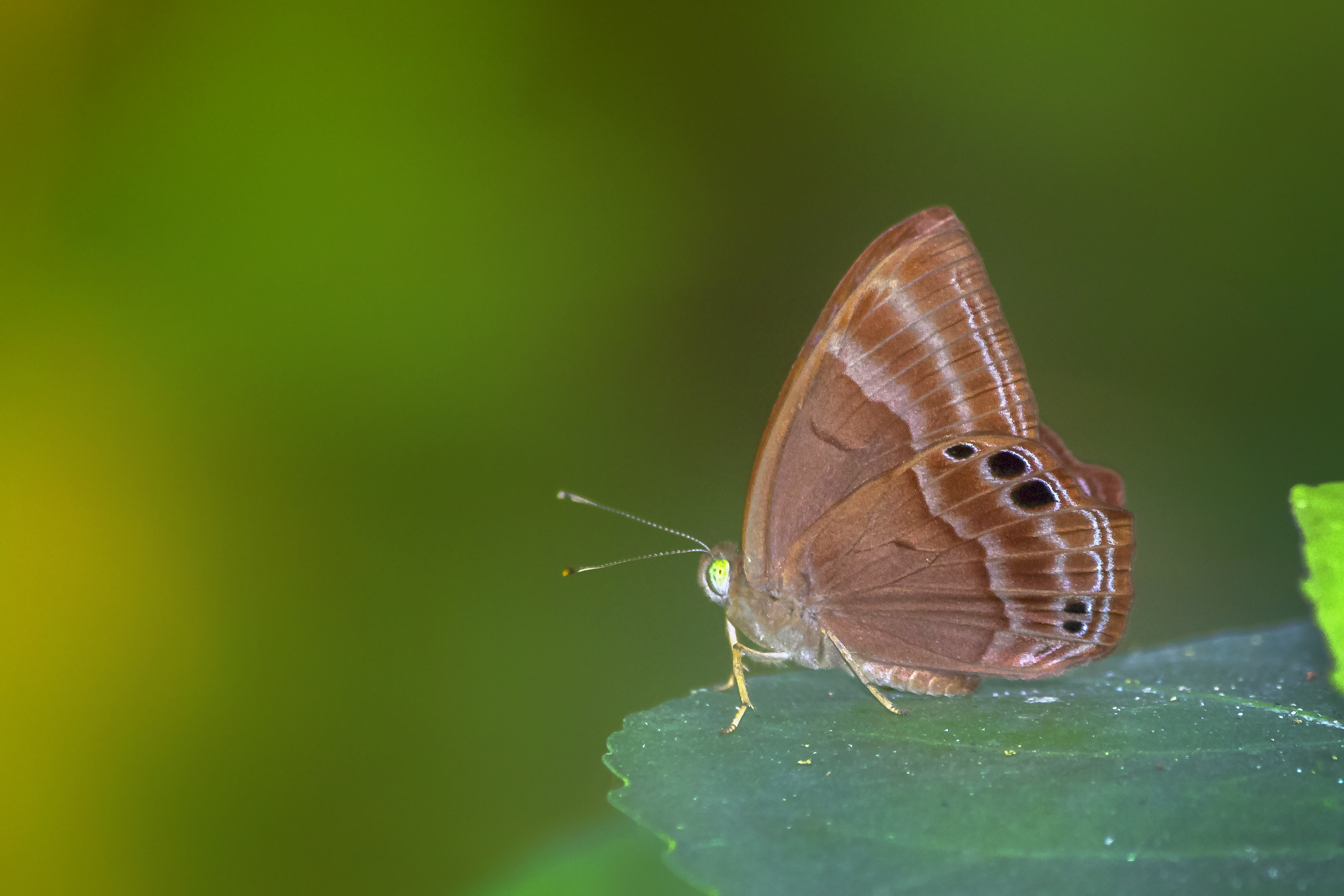
Ventral view (male)

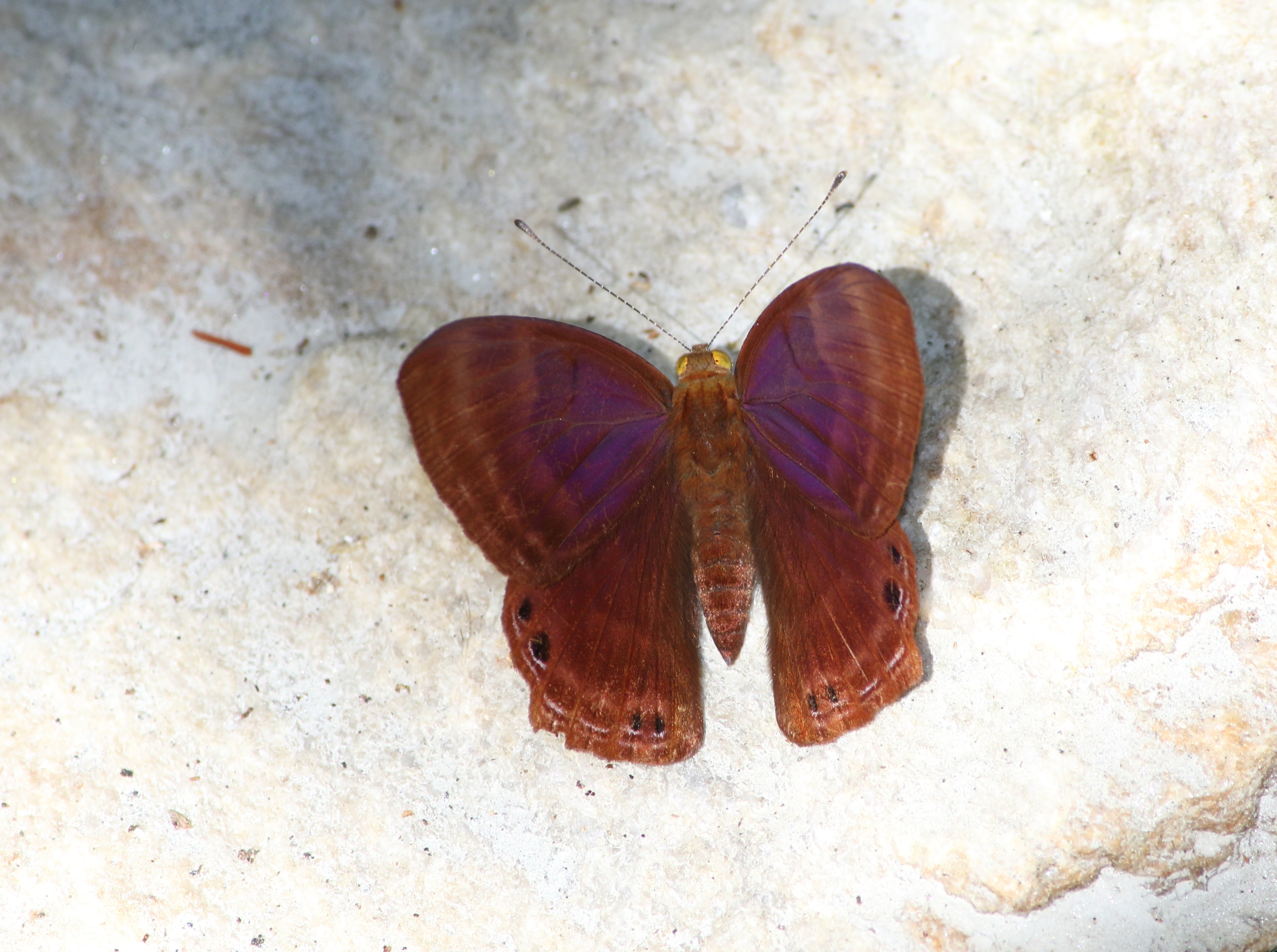
Dorsal view

===== Species: Abisara echerius (plum Judy) =====
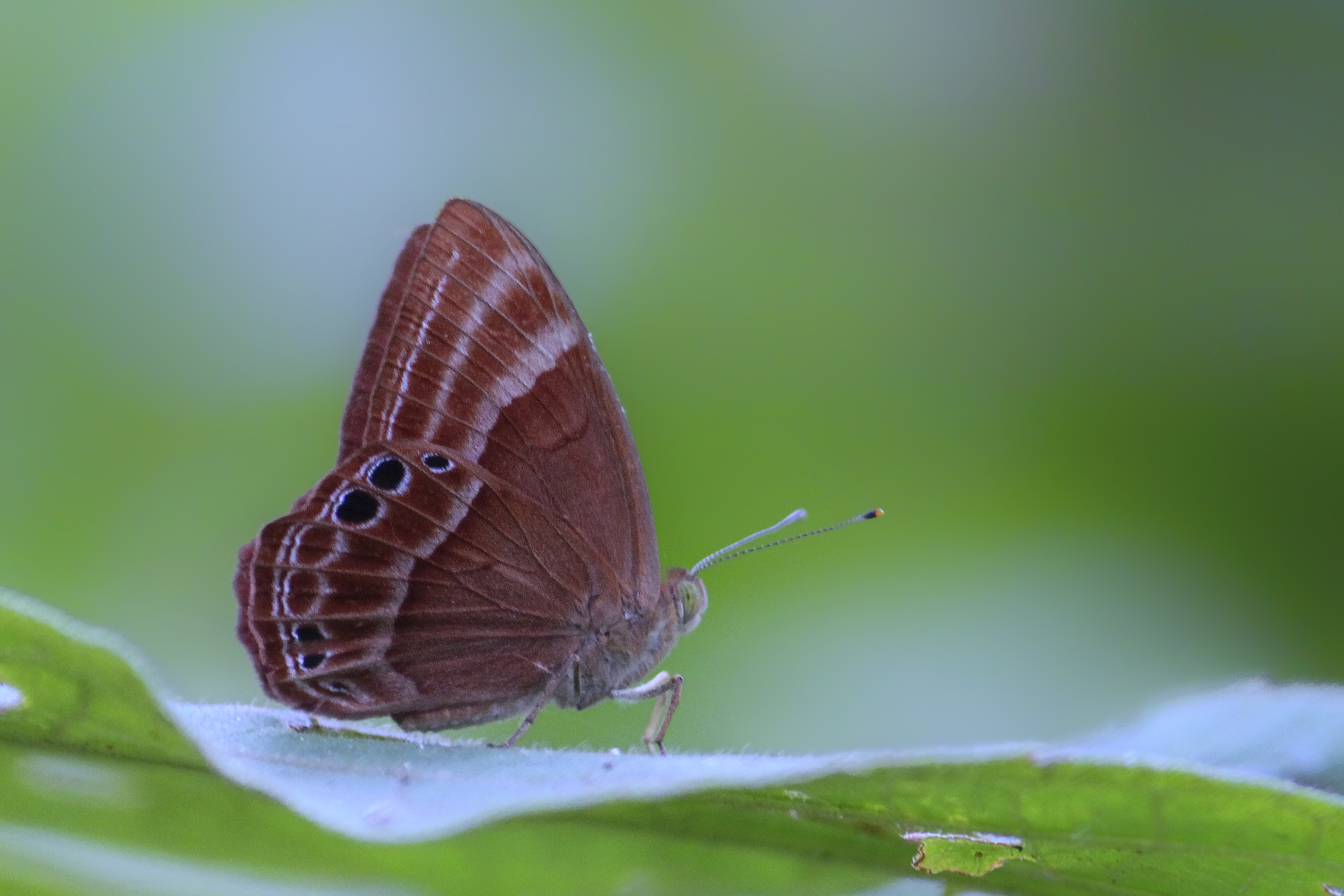
Ventral view

===== Species: Abisara fylla (dark Judy) =====
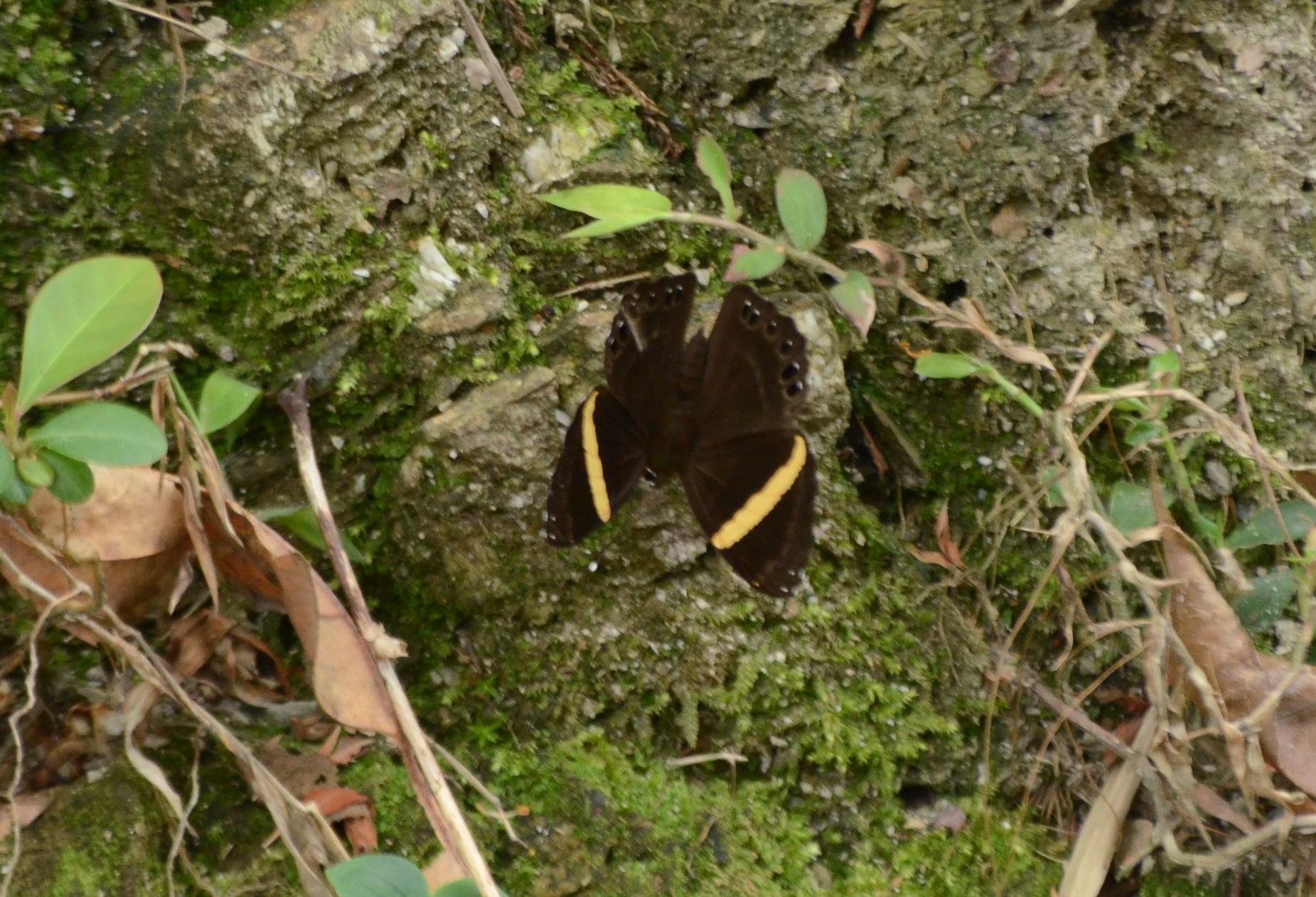
Dorsal view

Tribe: Nemeobiini

==== Genus: Dodona ====
===== Species: Dodona dipoea (lesser Punch) =====
Subspecies: Dodona dipoea dipoea (Himalayan lesser Punch)

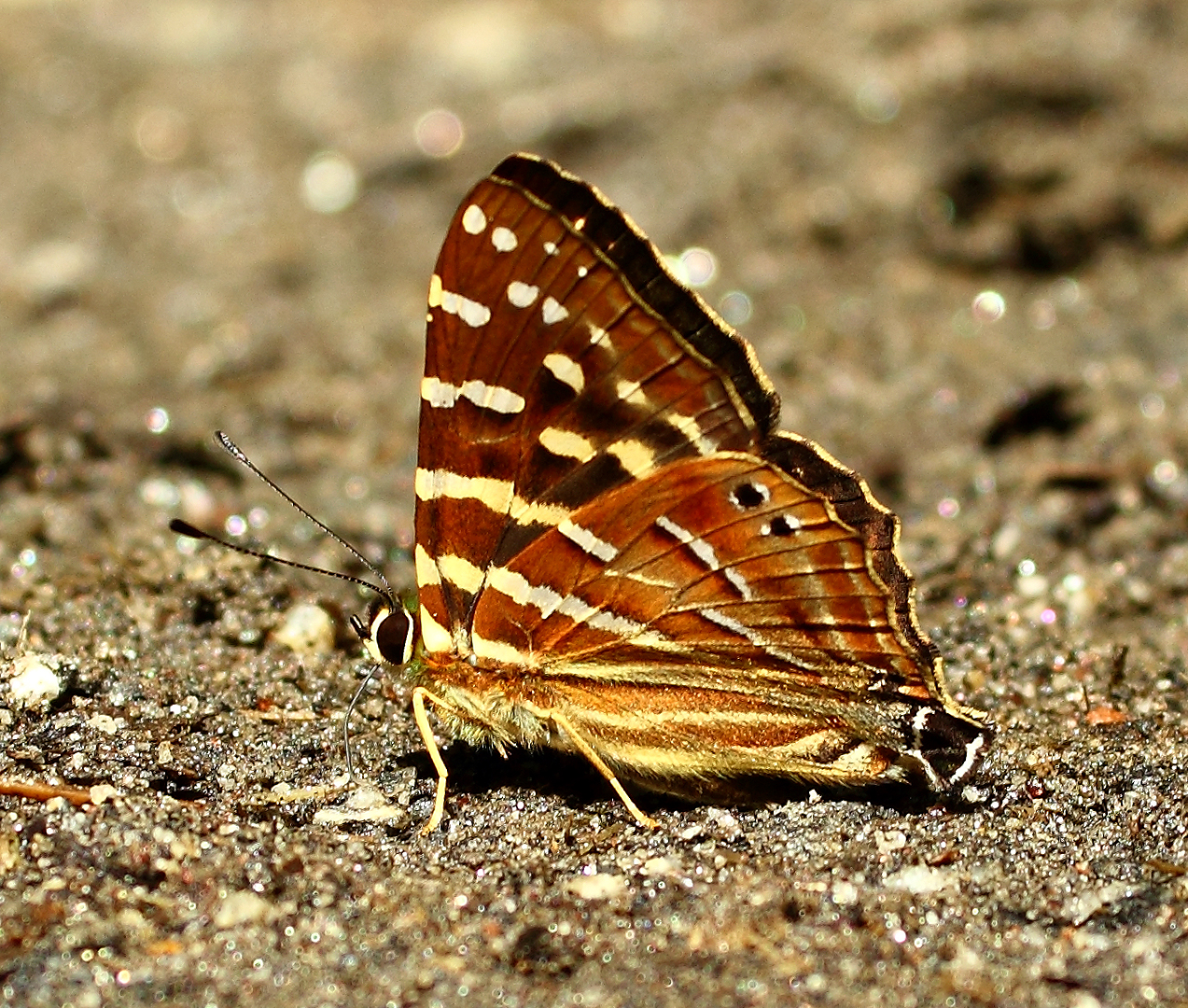
Ventral view

===== Species: Dodona egeon (orange Punch) =====
Subspecies: Dodona egeon egeon (Himalayan orange Punch)

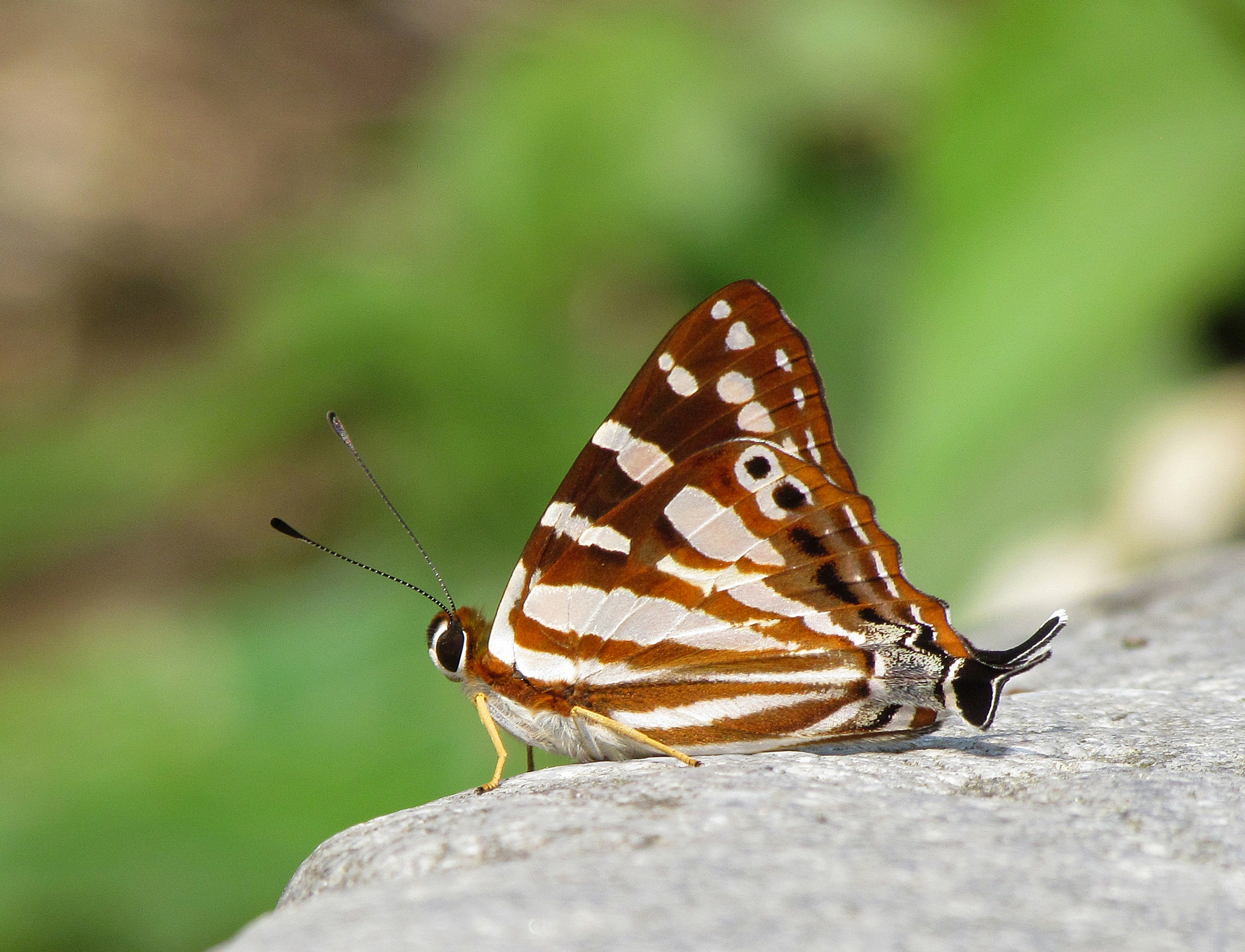
Ventral view

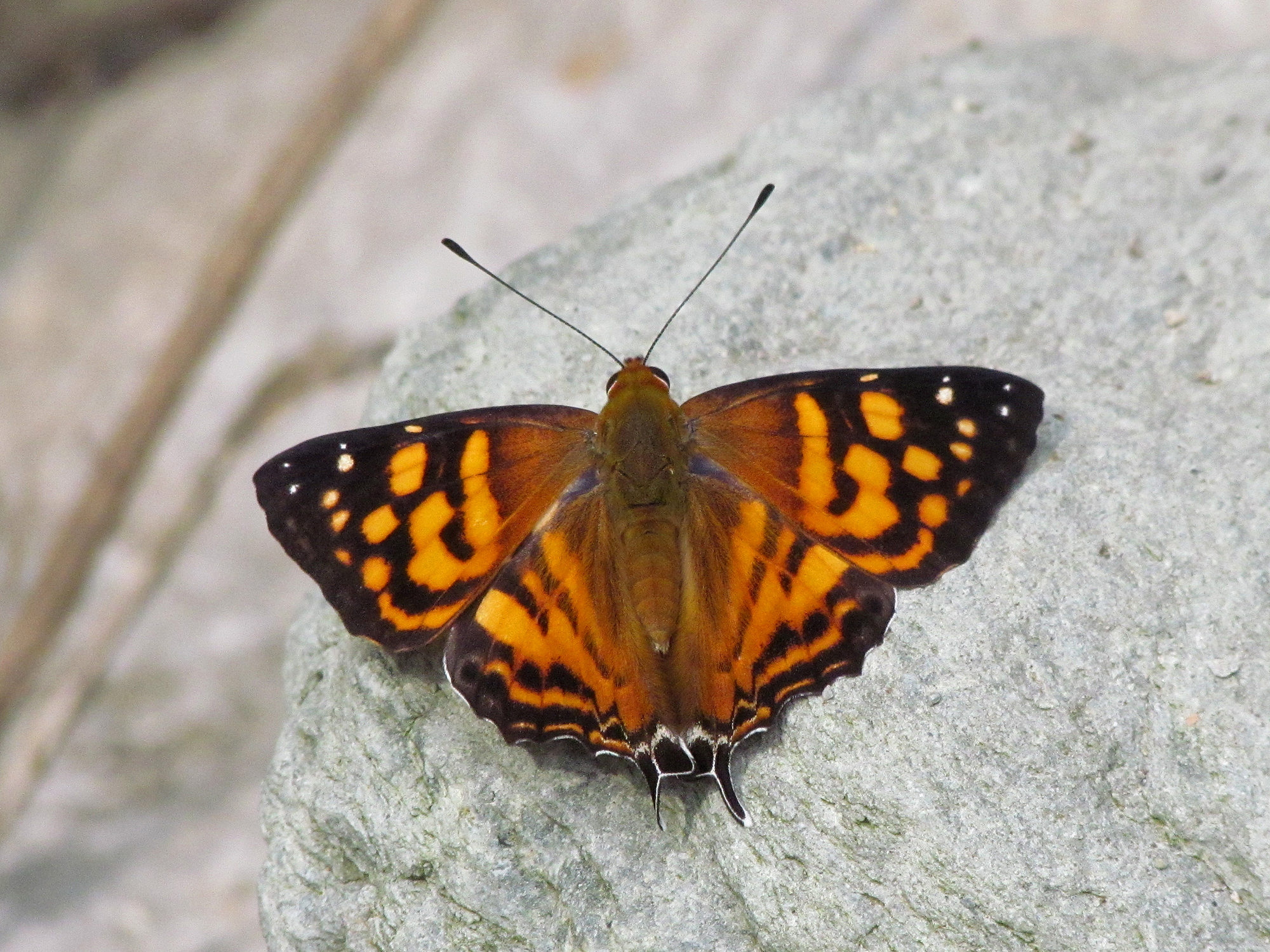
Dorsal view

==== Genus: Zemeros ====
===== Species: Zemeros flegyas (Punchinello) =====
Subspecies: Zemeros flegyas flegyas (Himalayan Punchinello)

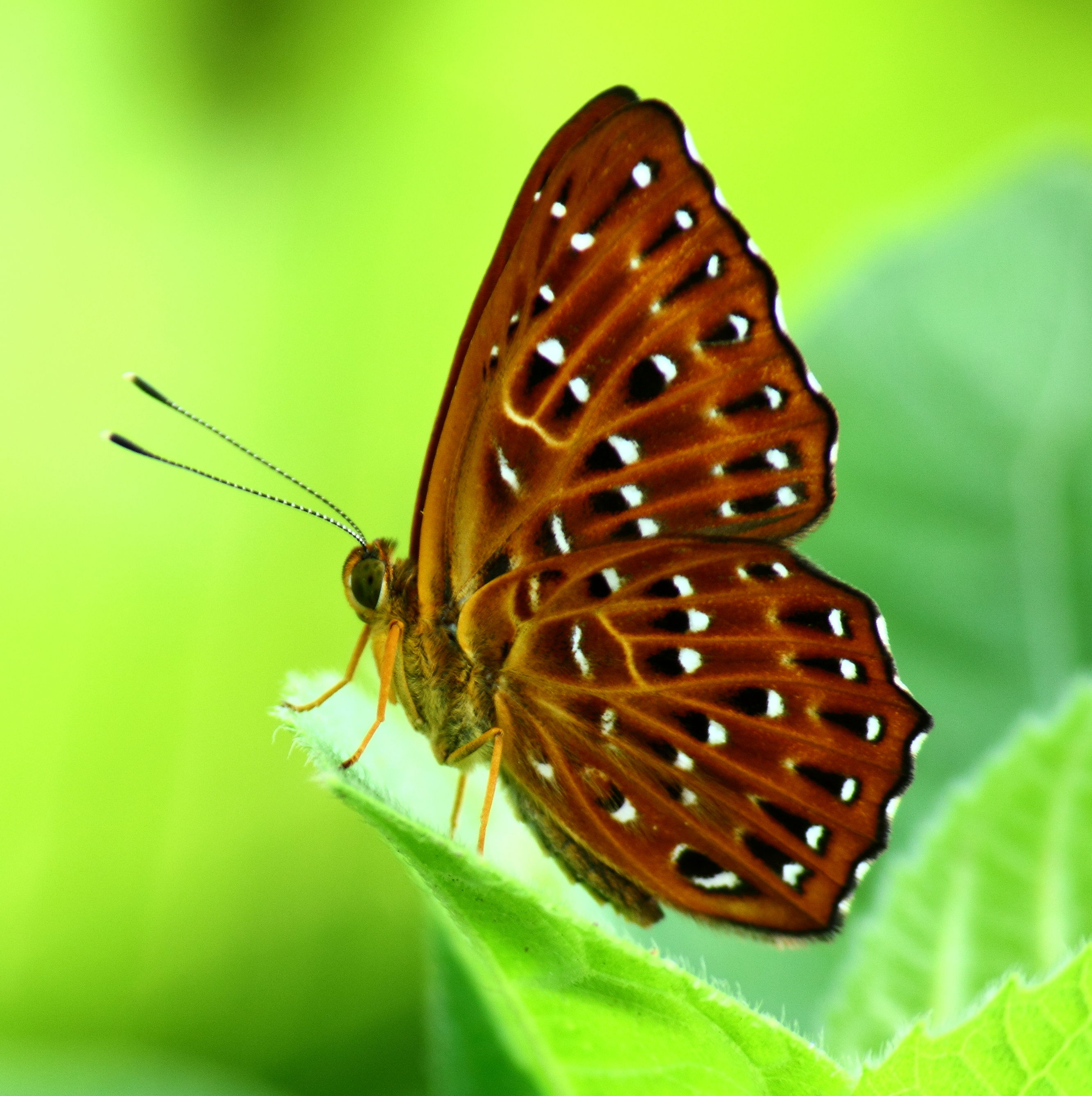
Ventral view

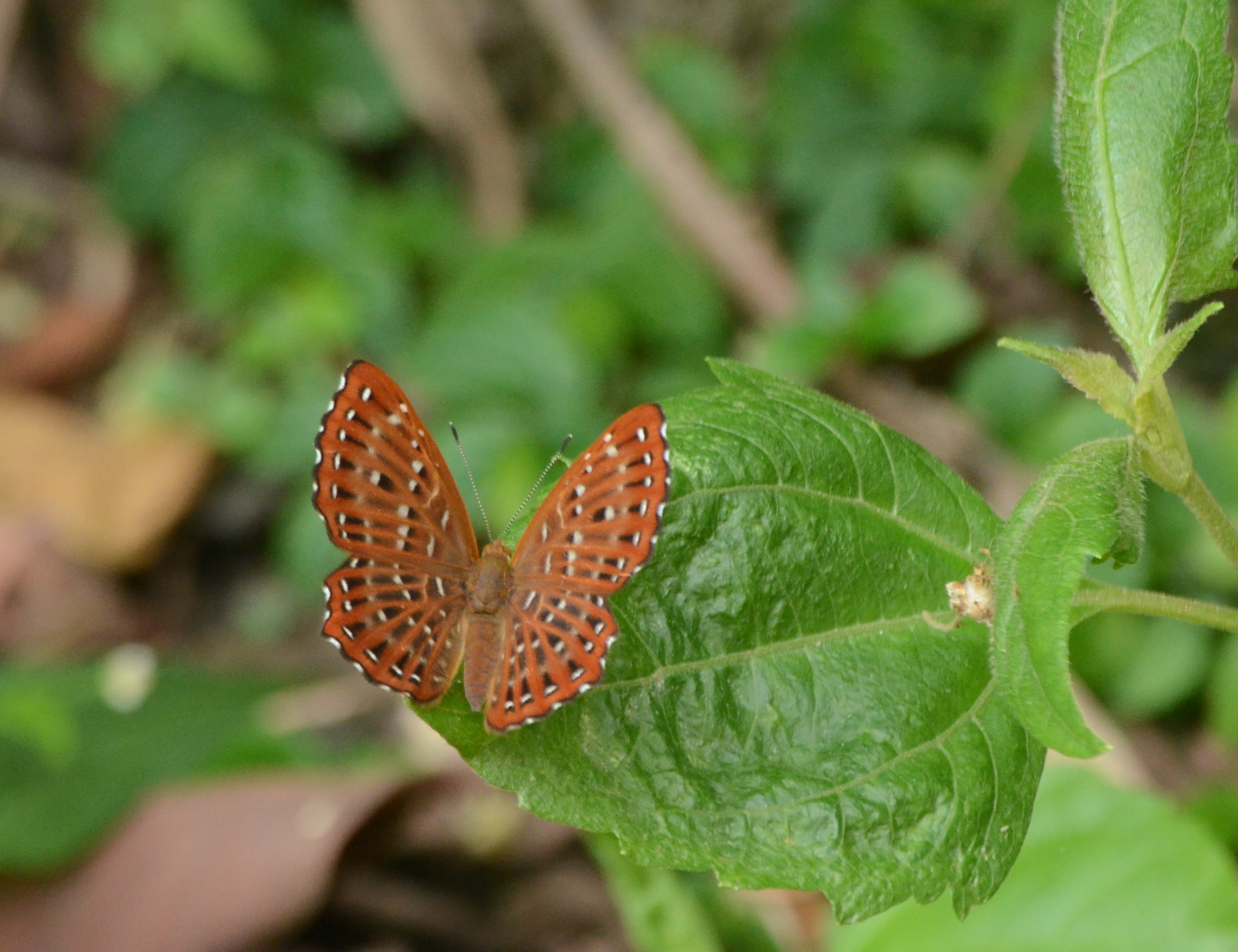
Dorsal view

== Family: Hesperiidae ==
=== Subfamily: Coeliadinae ===
==== Genus: Badamia ====
===== Species: Badamia exclamationis (brown awl) =====
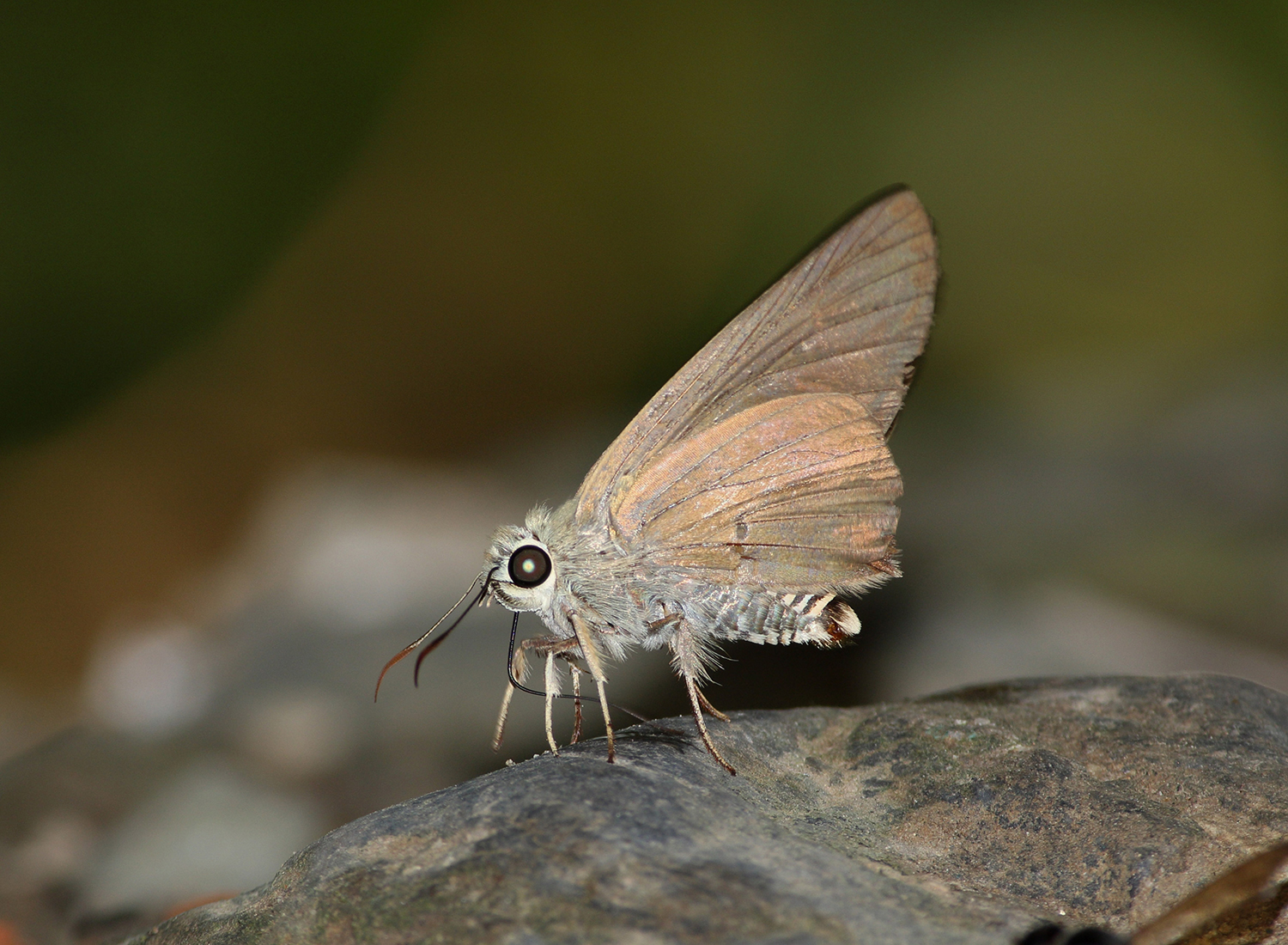
Ventral view

==== Genus: Bibasis ====
===== Species: Bibasis sena (orangetail awl) =====
Subspecies: Bibasis sena sena (Indian orangetail awl)

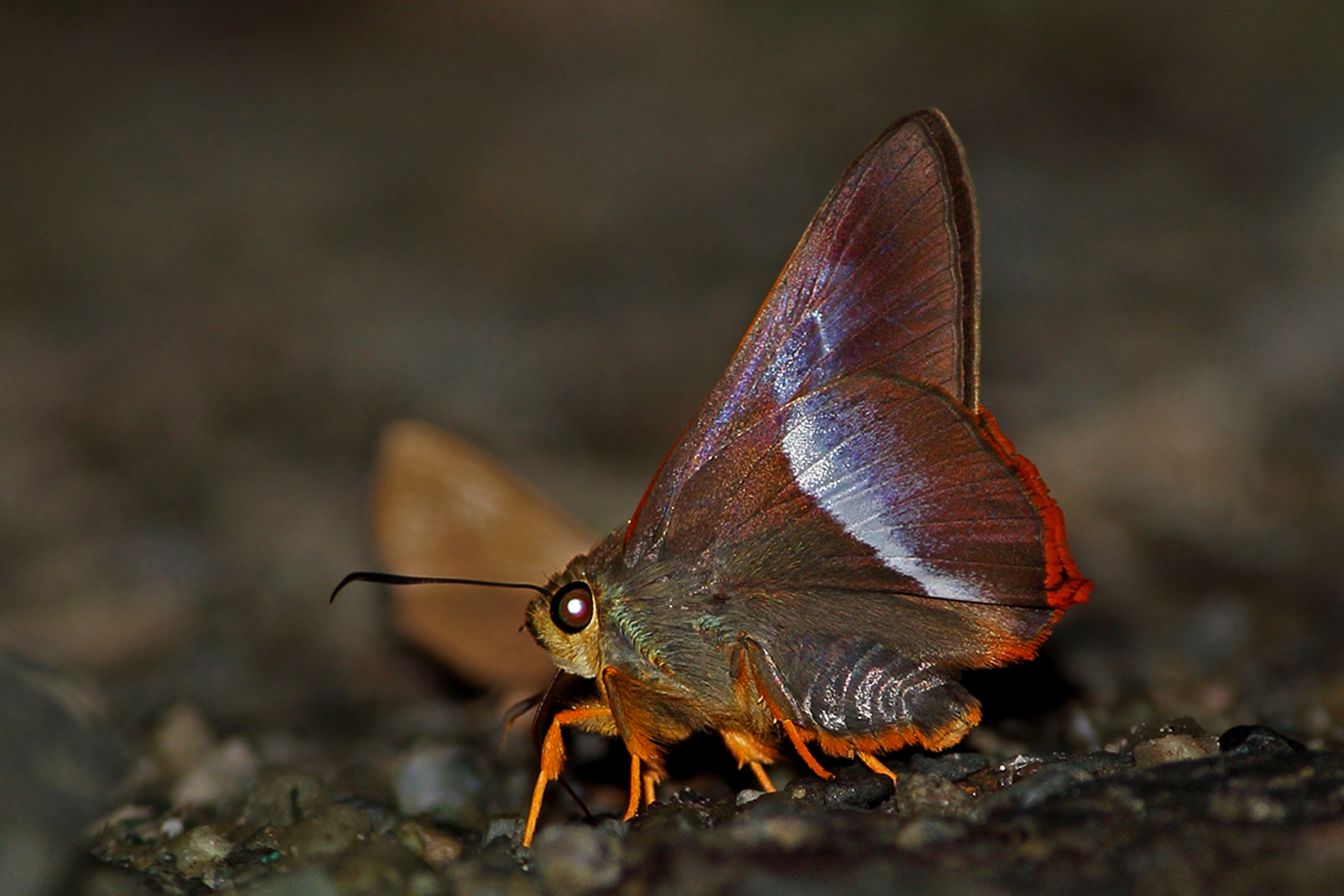
Ventral

==== Genus: Choaspes ====
===== Species: Choaspes benjaminii (common awlking) =====
Subspecies: Choaspes benjaminii japonica (Oriental common awlking)

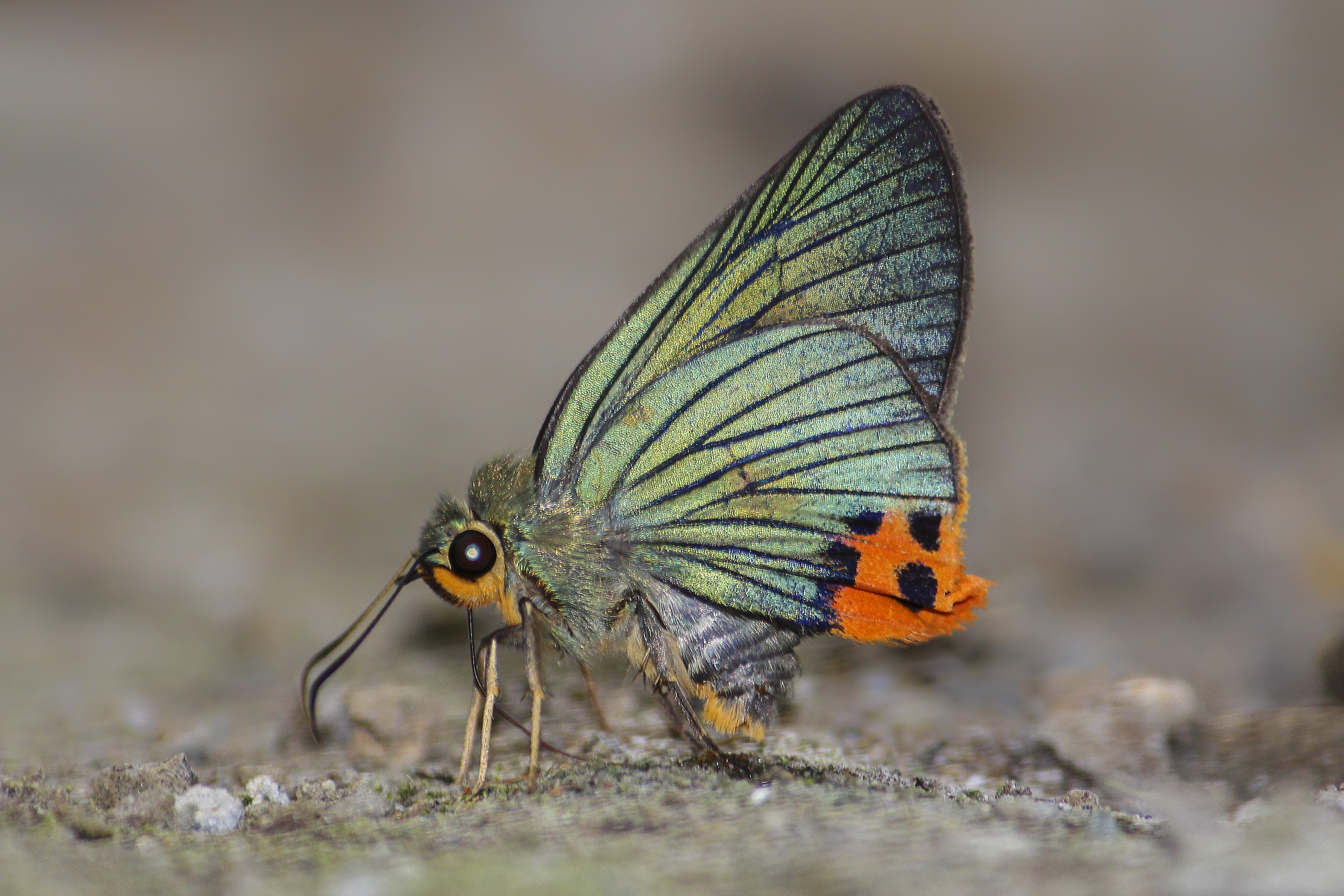
Ventral view

===== Species: Choaspes furcata (hooked awlking) =====
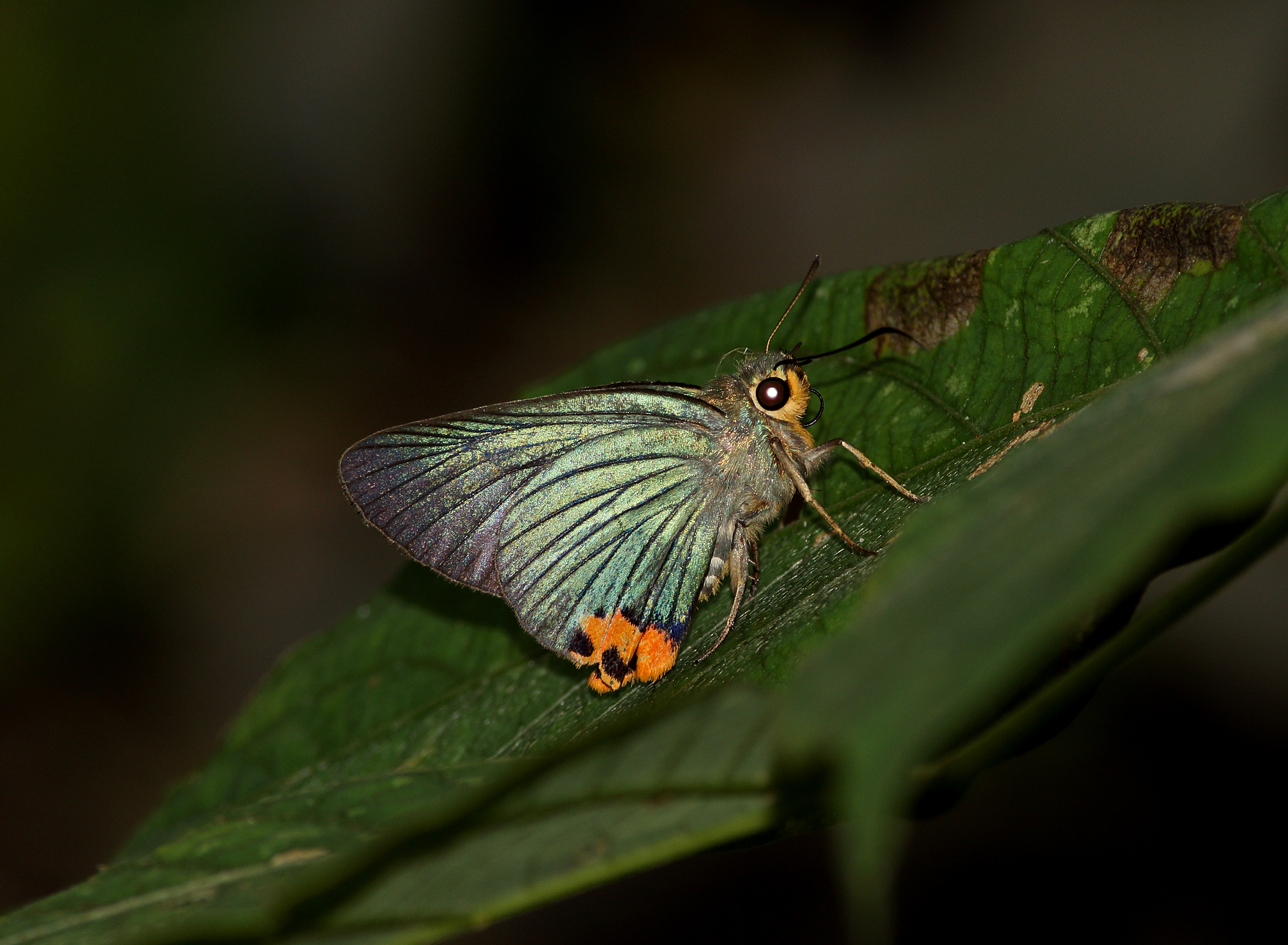
Ventral view

==== Genus: Hasora ====
===== Species: Hasora badra (common awl) =====
Subspecies: Hasora badra badra (Oriental common awl)

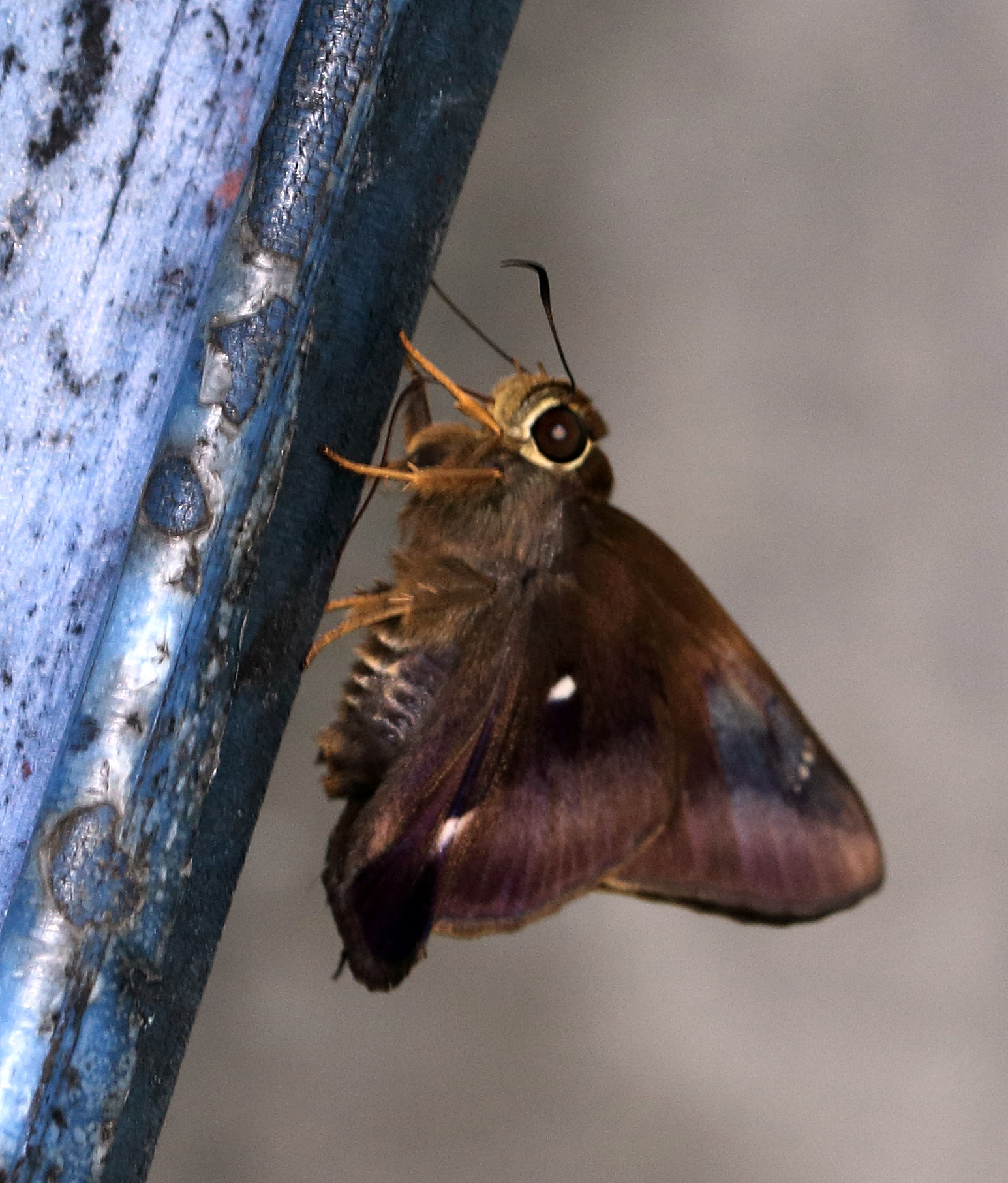
Ventral

=== Subfamily: Hesperiinae ===
Tribe: Aeromachini

==== Genus: Matapa ====
===== Species: Matapa aria (common branded redeye or common redeye) =====
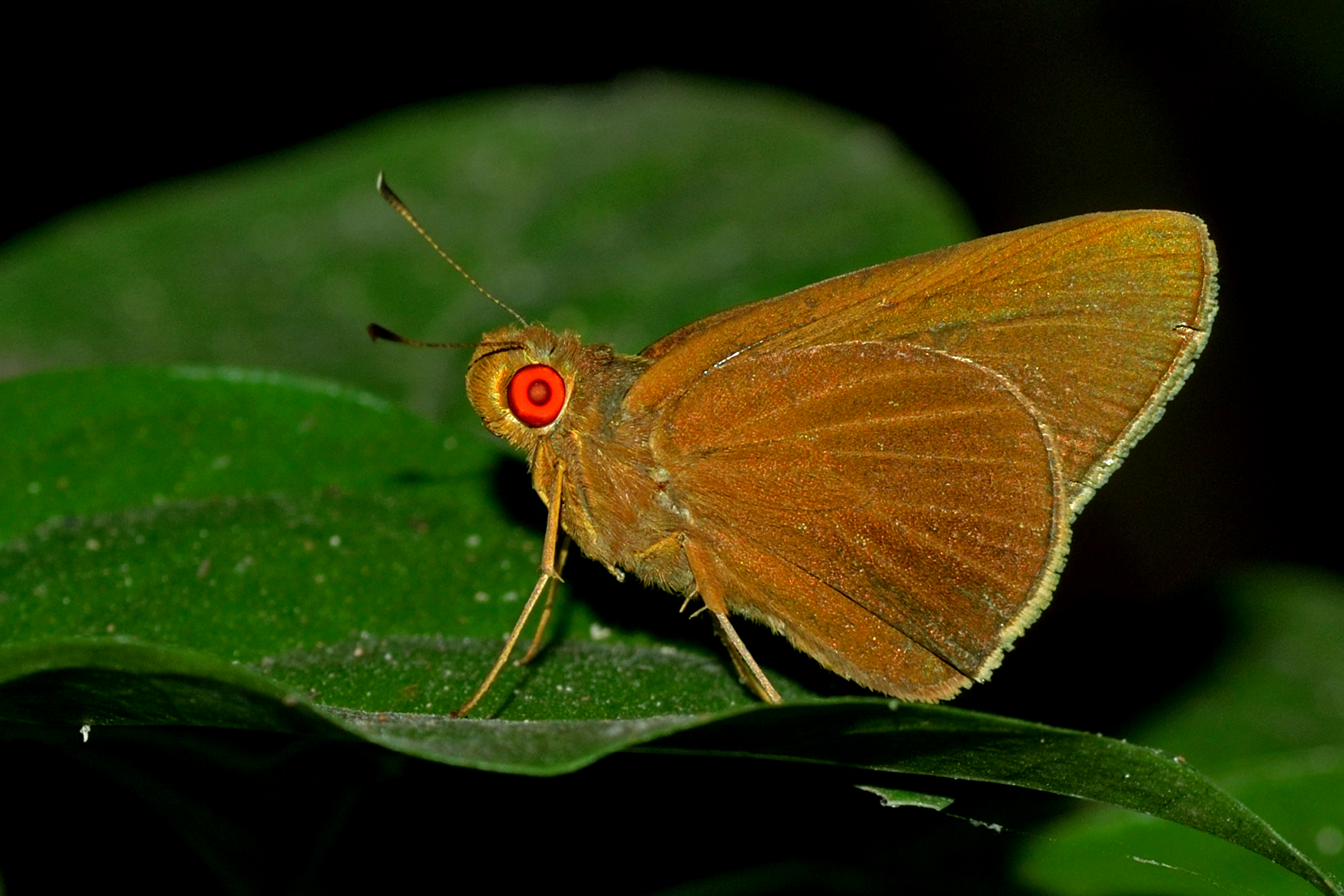
Ventral view

==== Genus: Ochus ====
===== Species: Ochus subvittatus (tiger hopper) =====
Subspecies: Ochus subvittatus subradiatus (Khasi tiger hopper)

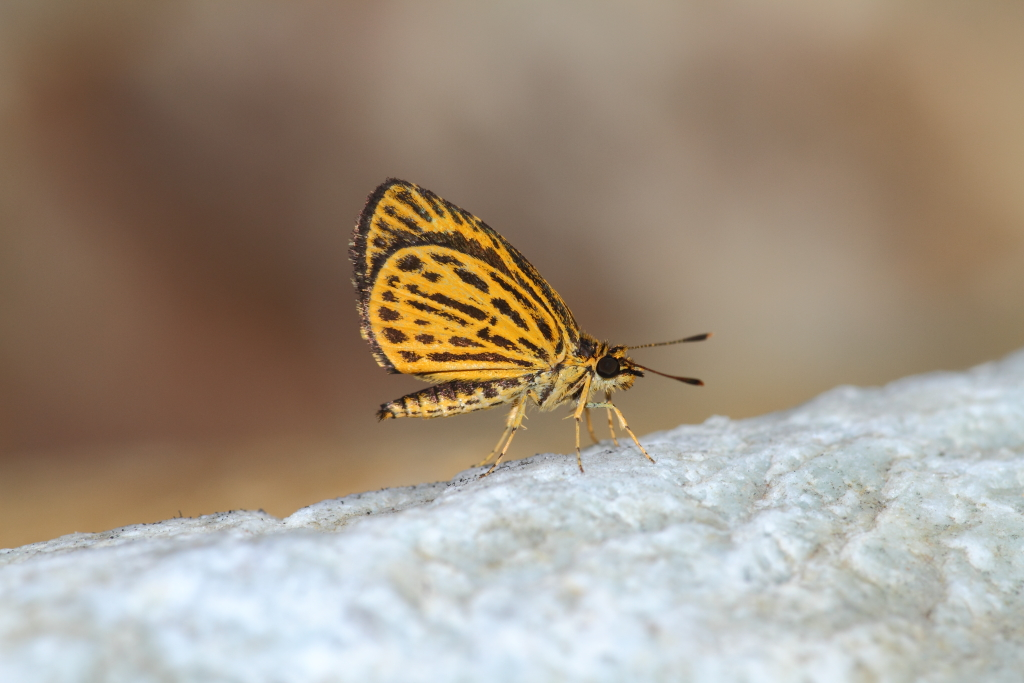
Ventral view

==== Genus: Suastus ====
===== Species: Suastus gremius (Oriental palm bob) =====
Subspecies: Suastus gremius gremius ( Indian palm bob)

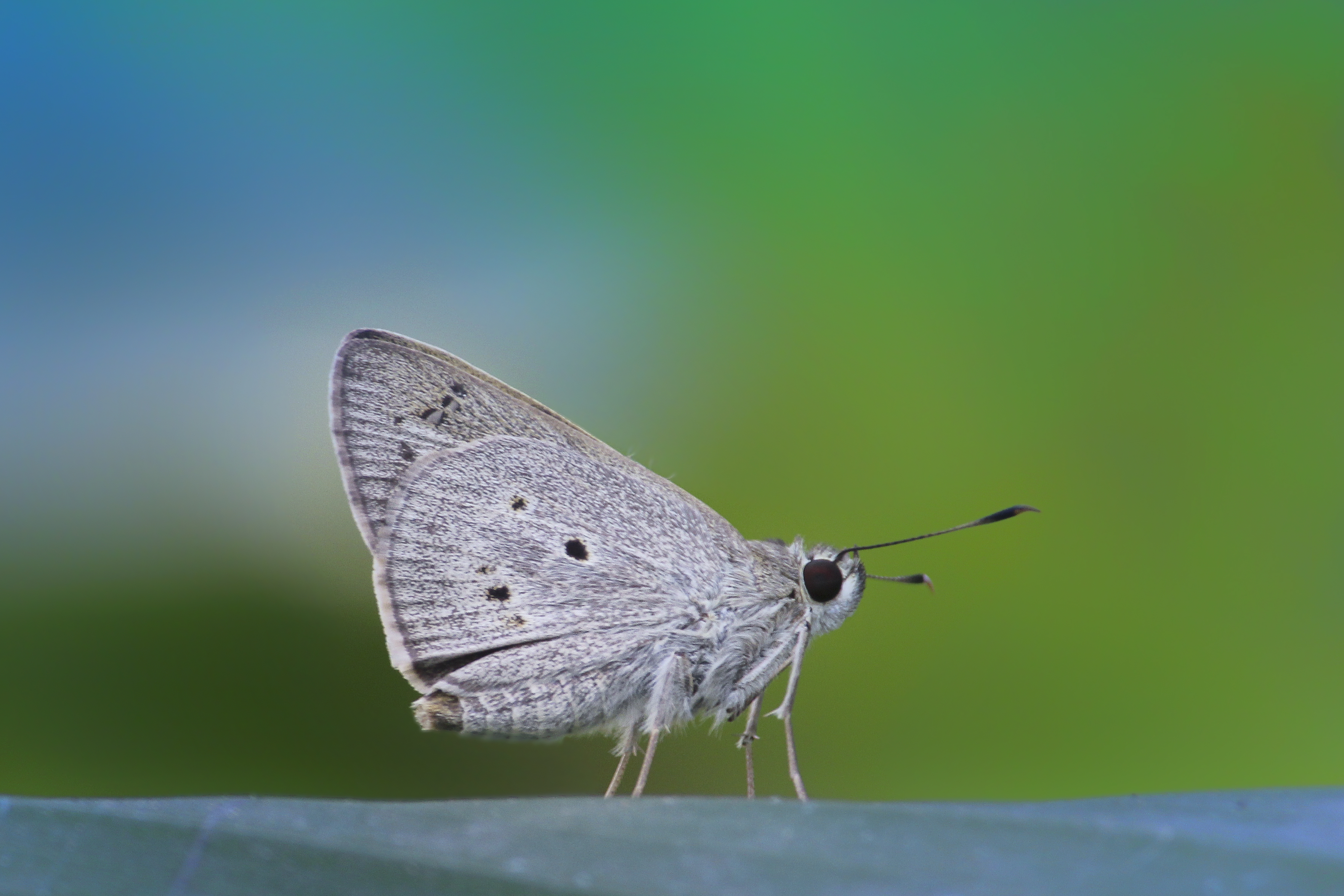
Ventral view

==== Genus: Udaspes ====
===== Species: Udaspes folus (grass demon) =====
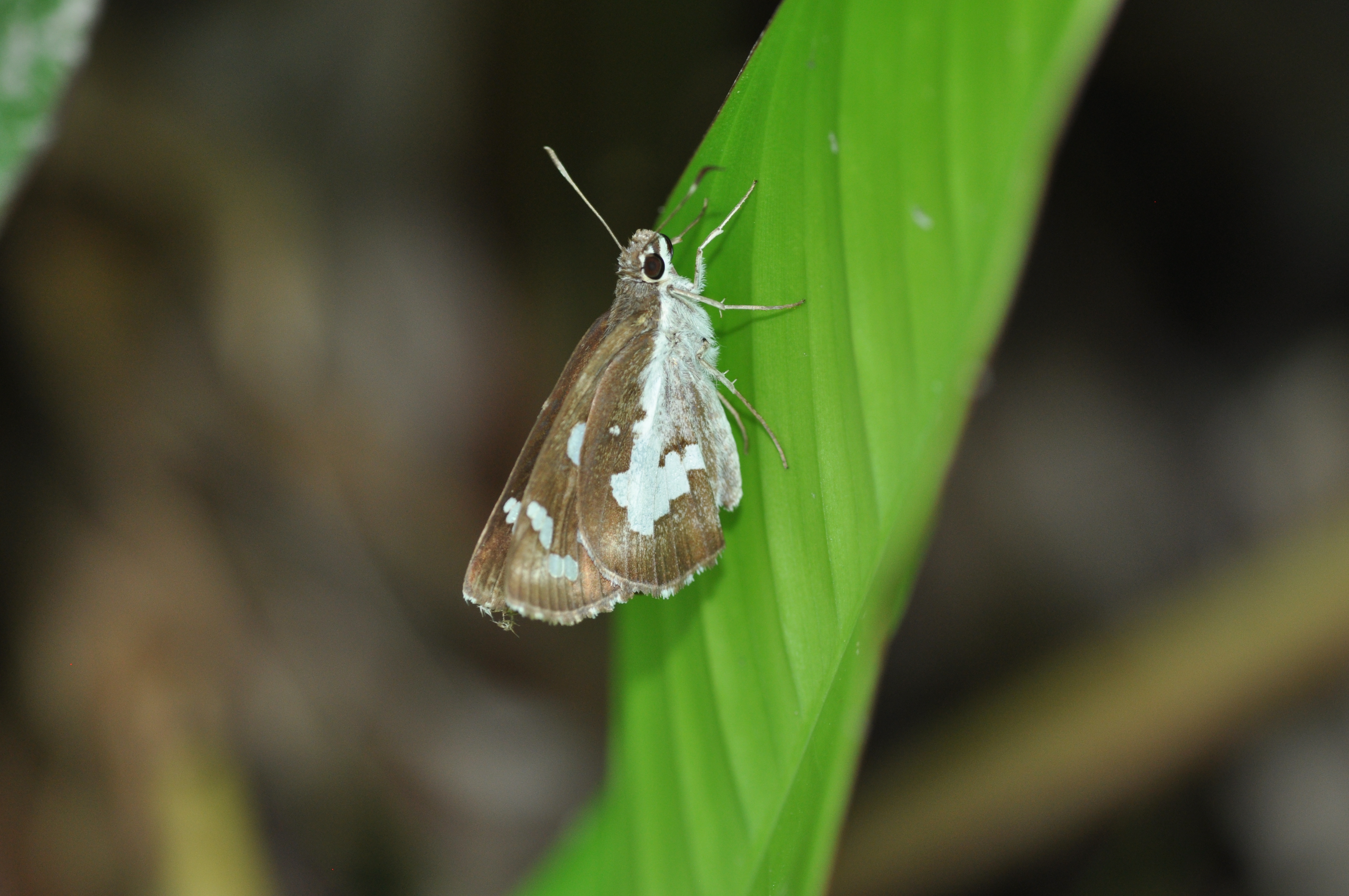
Ventral view

==== Genus: Zographetus ====
===== Species: Zographetus ogygia (purple-spotted flitter) =====
Subspecies: Zographetus ogygia ogygia (continental purple-spotted flitter)

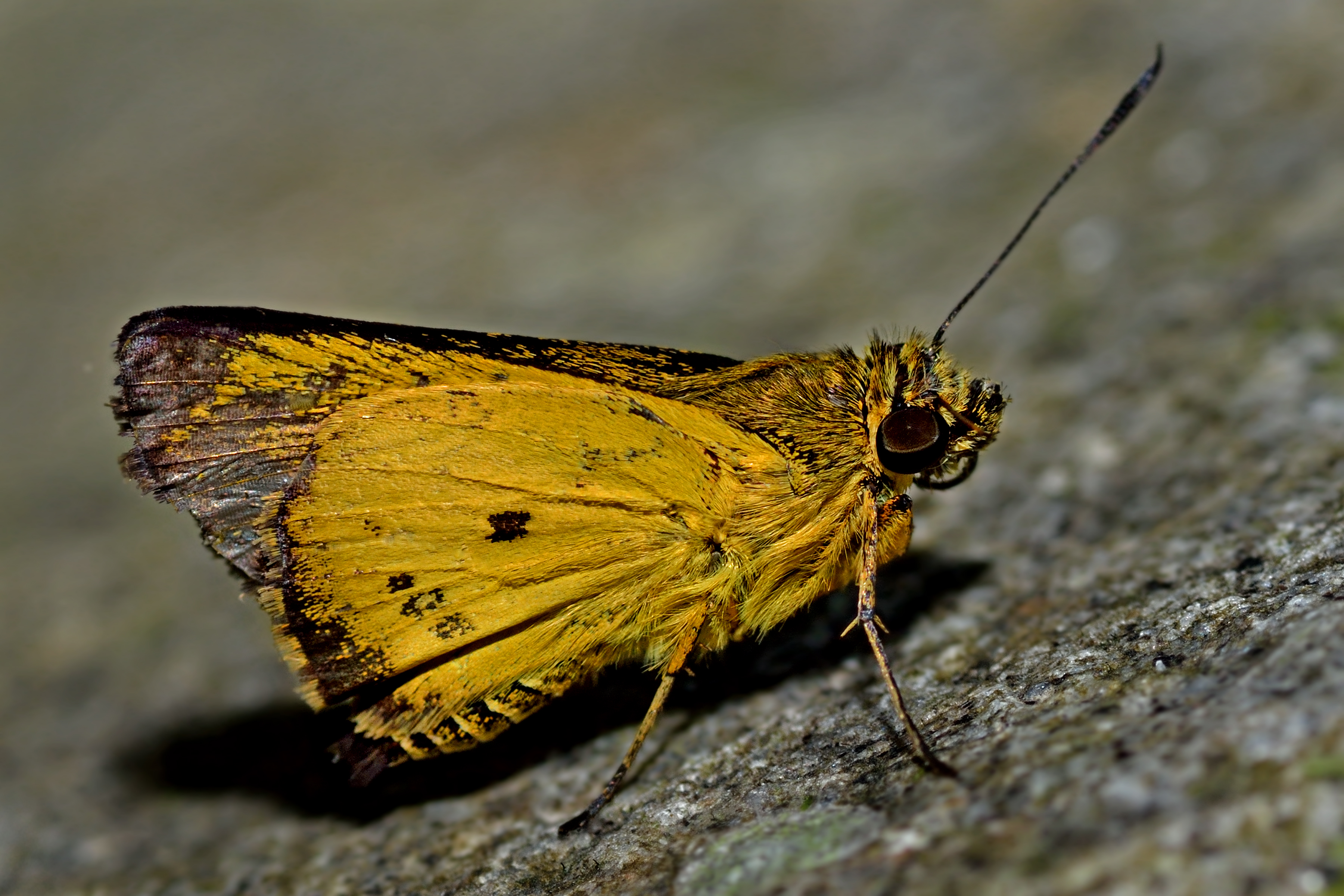
Ventral view

Tribe: Erionotini

==== Genus: Ancistroides ====
===== Species: Ancistroides nigrita (chocolate demon) =====
Subspecies: Ancistroides nigrita diocles (Bengal chocolate demon)

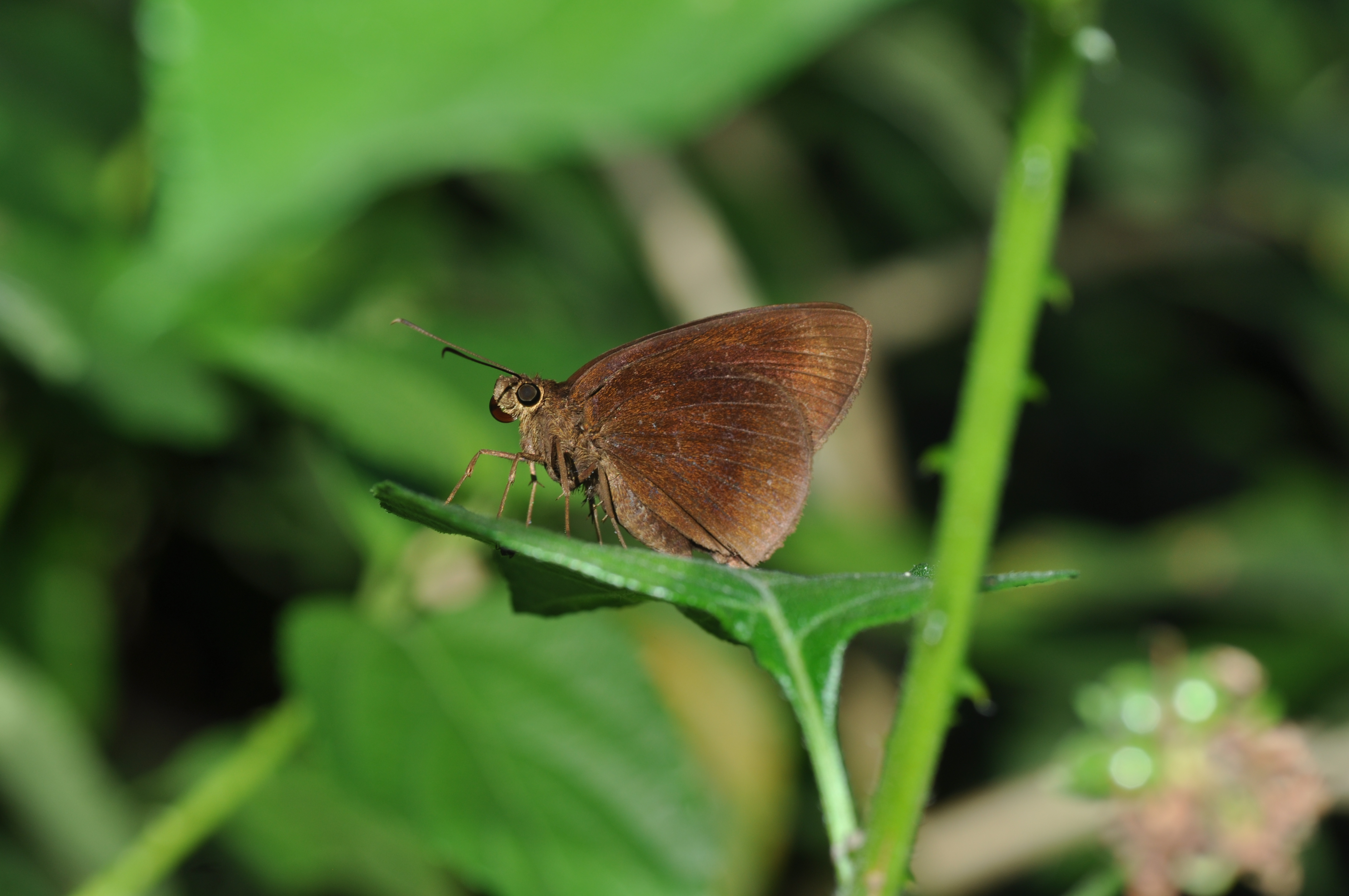
Ventral view

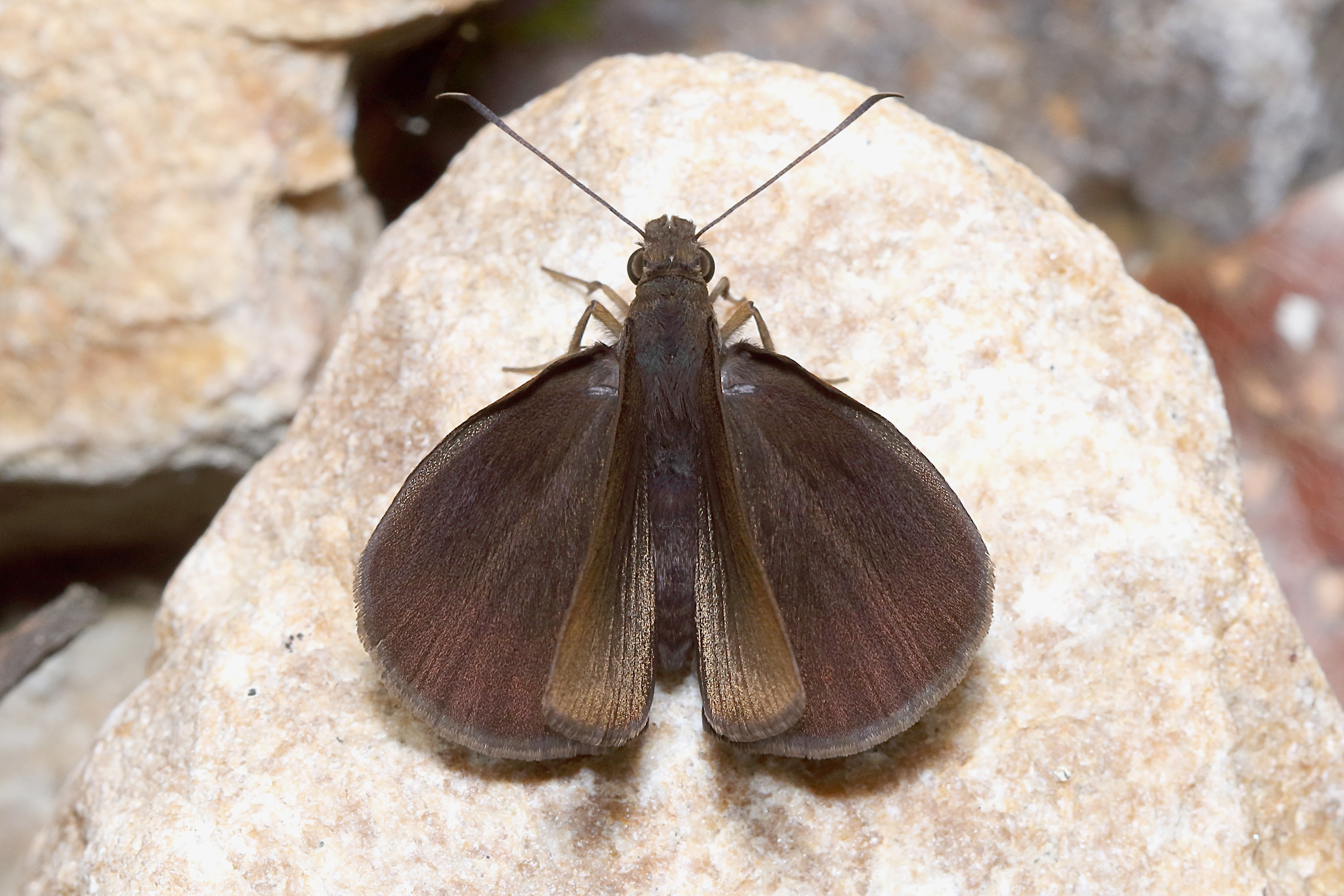
Dorsal view

==== Genus: Arnetta ====
===== Species: Arnetta atkinsoni (black-tufted bob or Atkinson's bob) =====
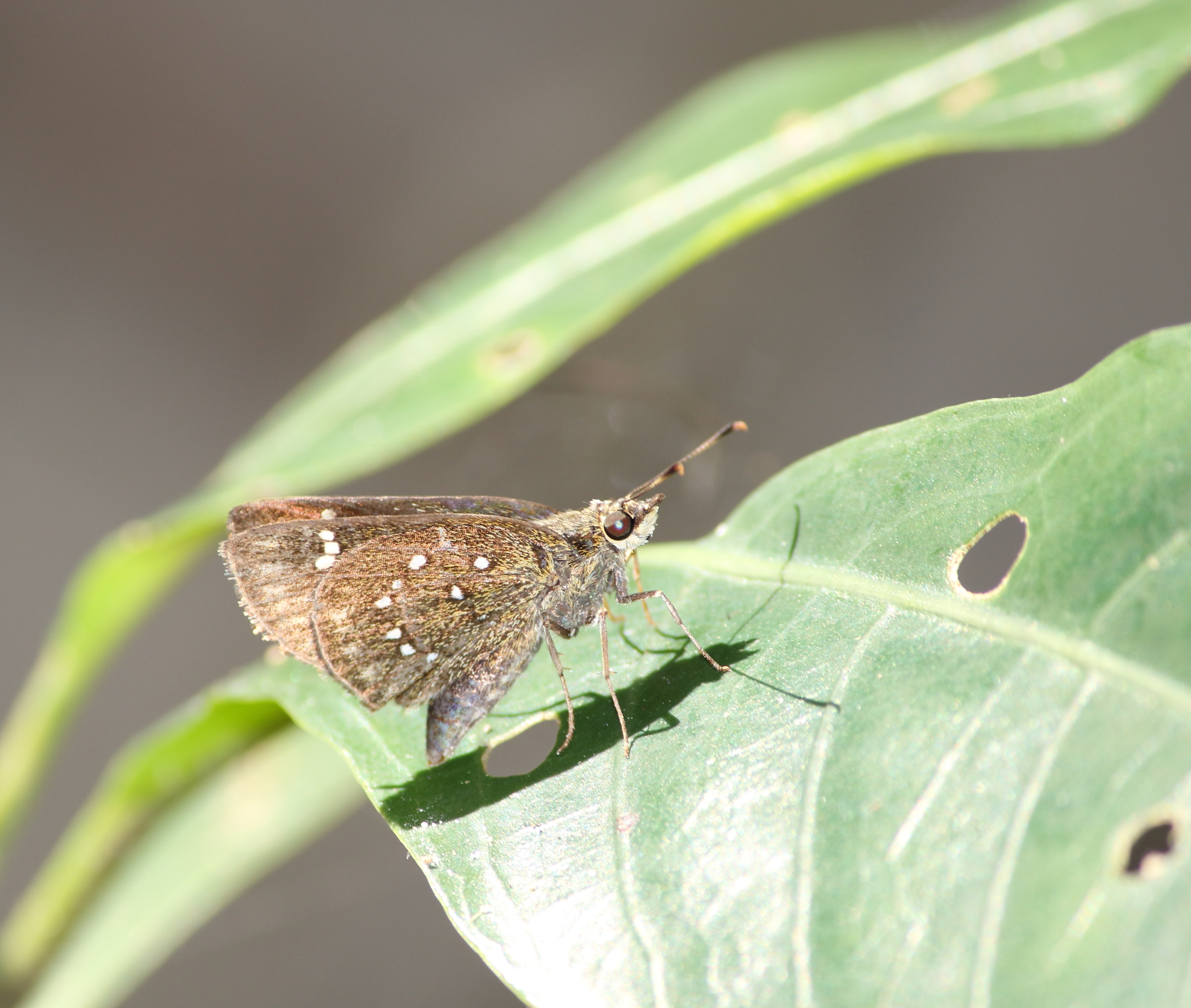
Ventral view

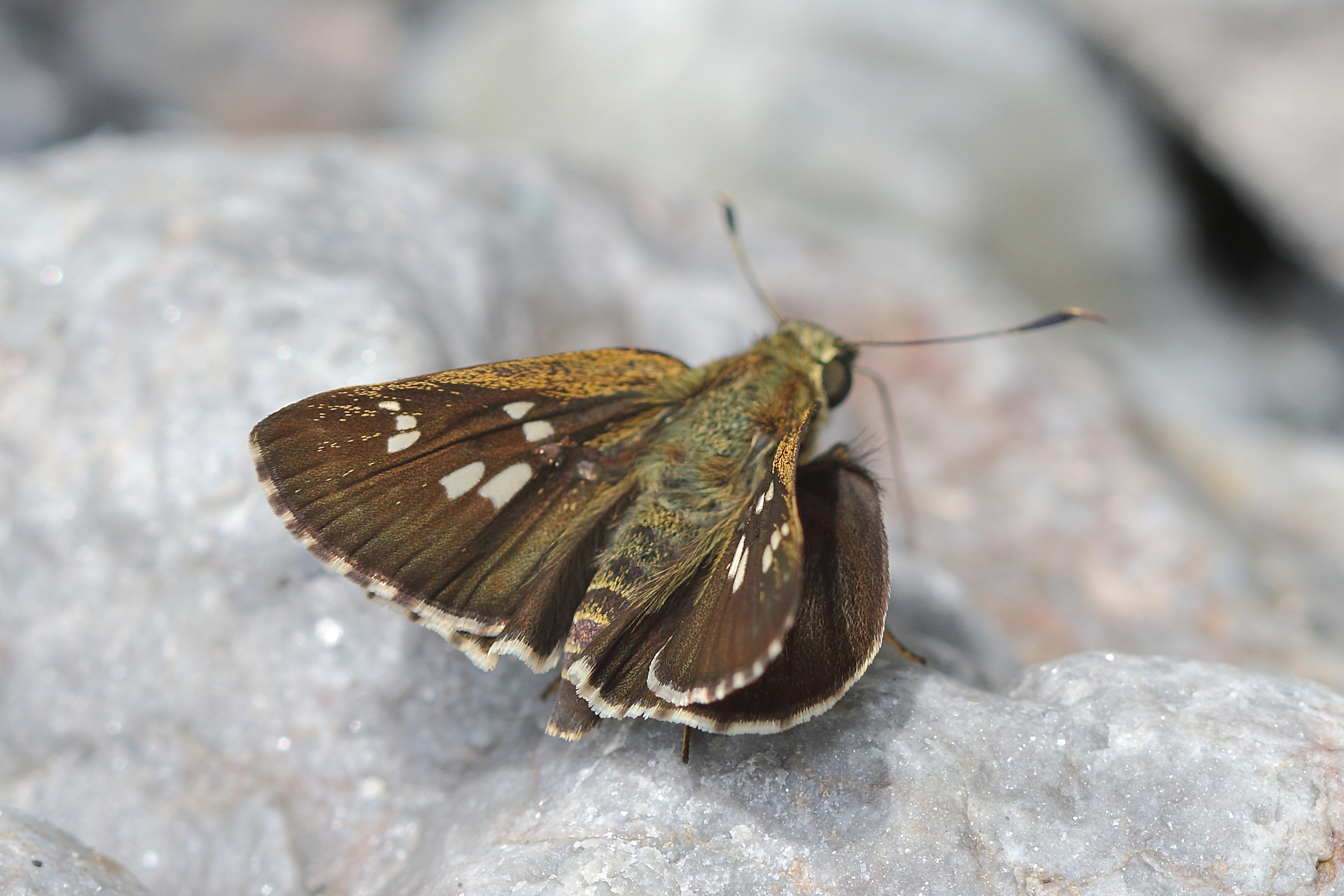
Dorsal view

==== Genus: Iambrix ====
===== Species: Iambrix salsala (chestnut bob) =====
Subspecies: Iambrix salsala salsala (eastern chestnut bob)

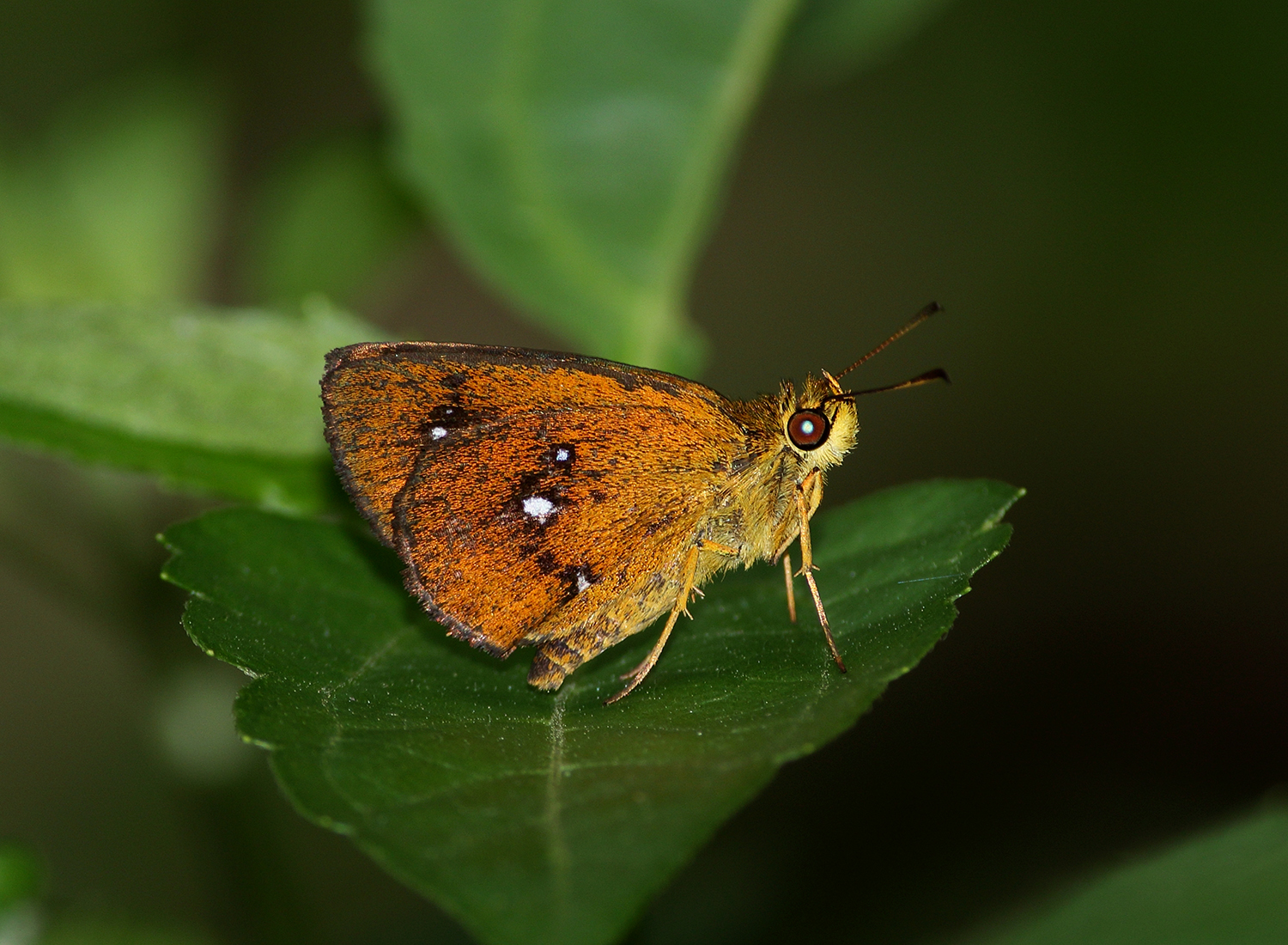
Ventral view

Tribe: Baorini

==== Genus: Borbo ====
===== Species: Borbo bevani (lesser rice swift or Bevan's swift) =====
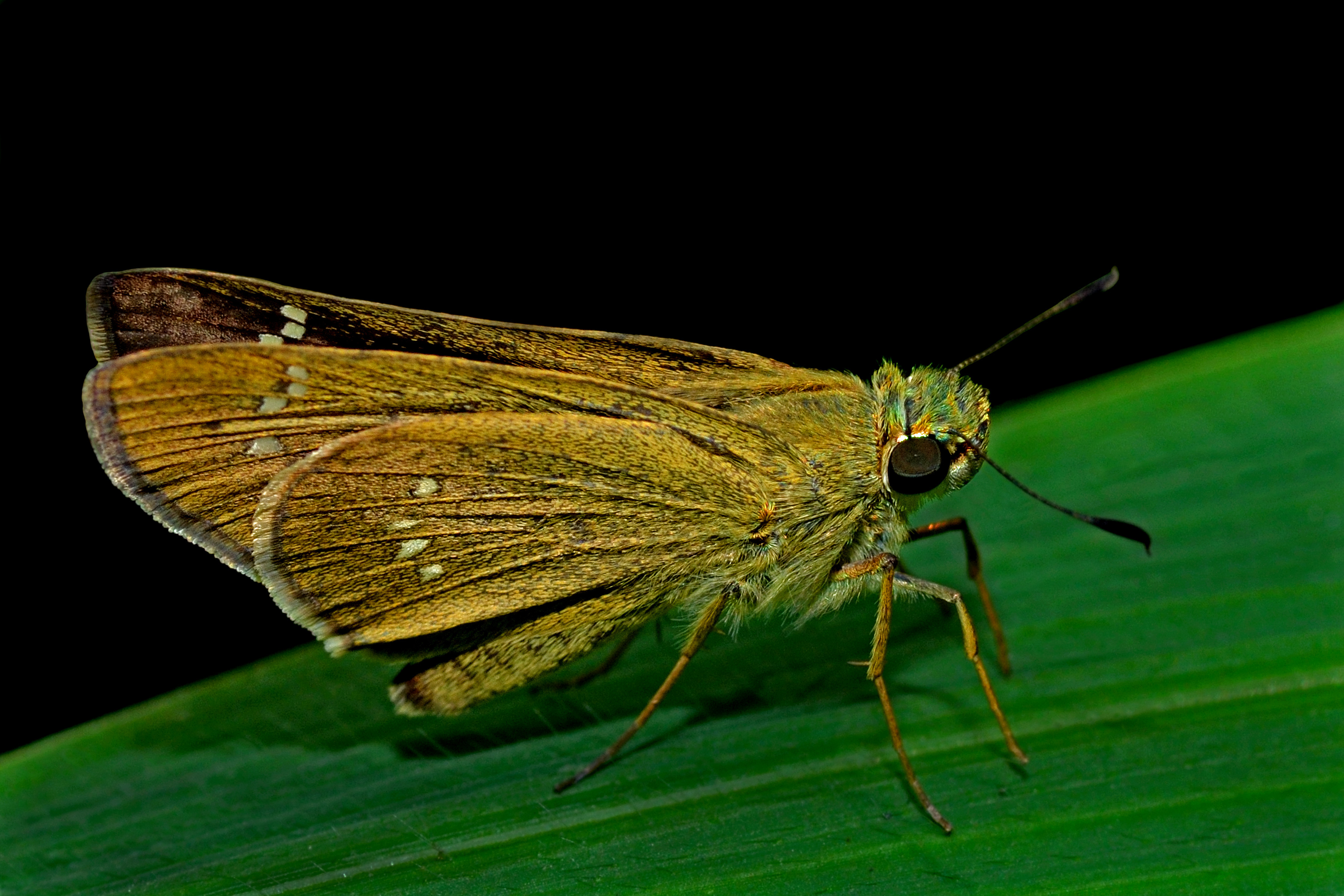
Ventral view

=== Subfamily: Pyrginae ===
Tribe: Carcharodini

==== Genus: Spialia ====
===== Species: Spialia galba (Indian grizzled skipper) =====
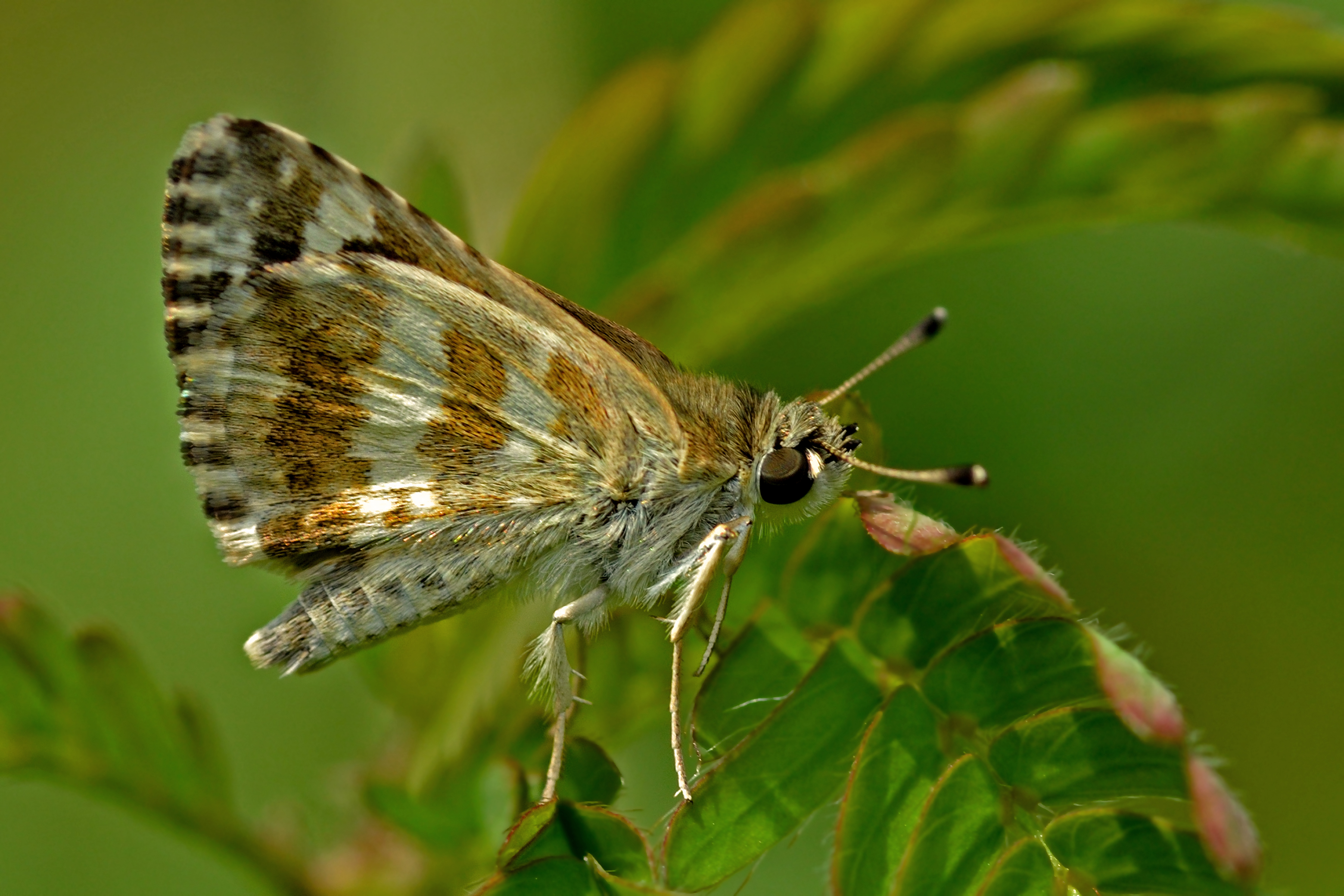
Ventral view

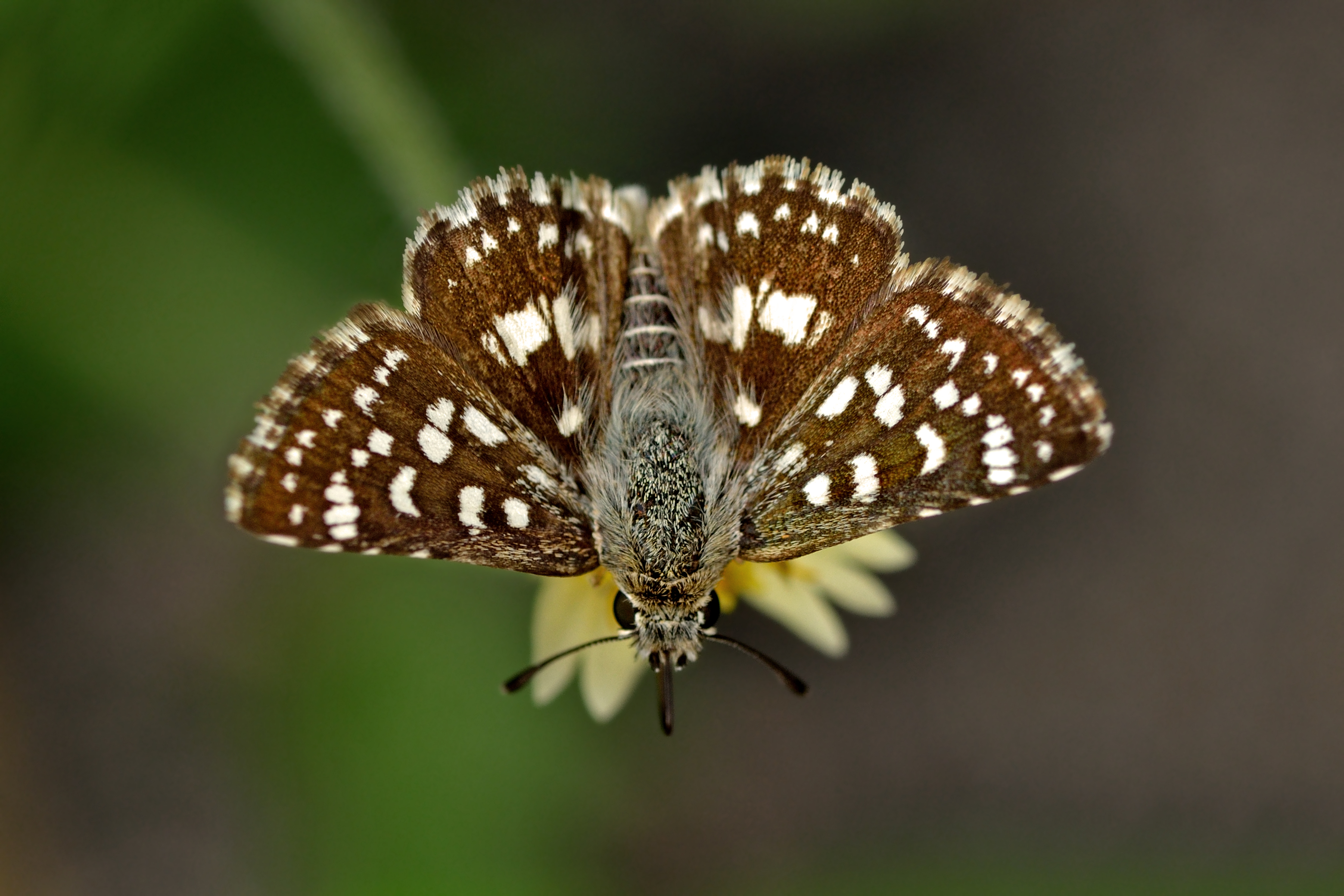
Dorsal view

Tribe: Celaenorrhinini

==== Genus: Celaenorrhinus ====
===== Species: Celaenorrhinus putra (restricted spotted flat) =====
Subspecies: Celaenorrhinus putra putra (Bengal restricted spotted flat)

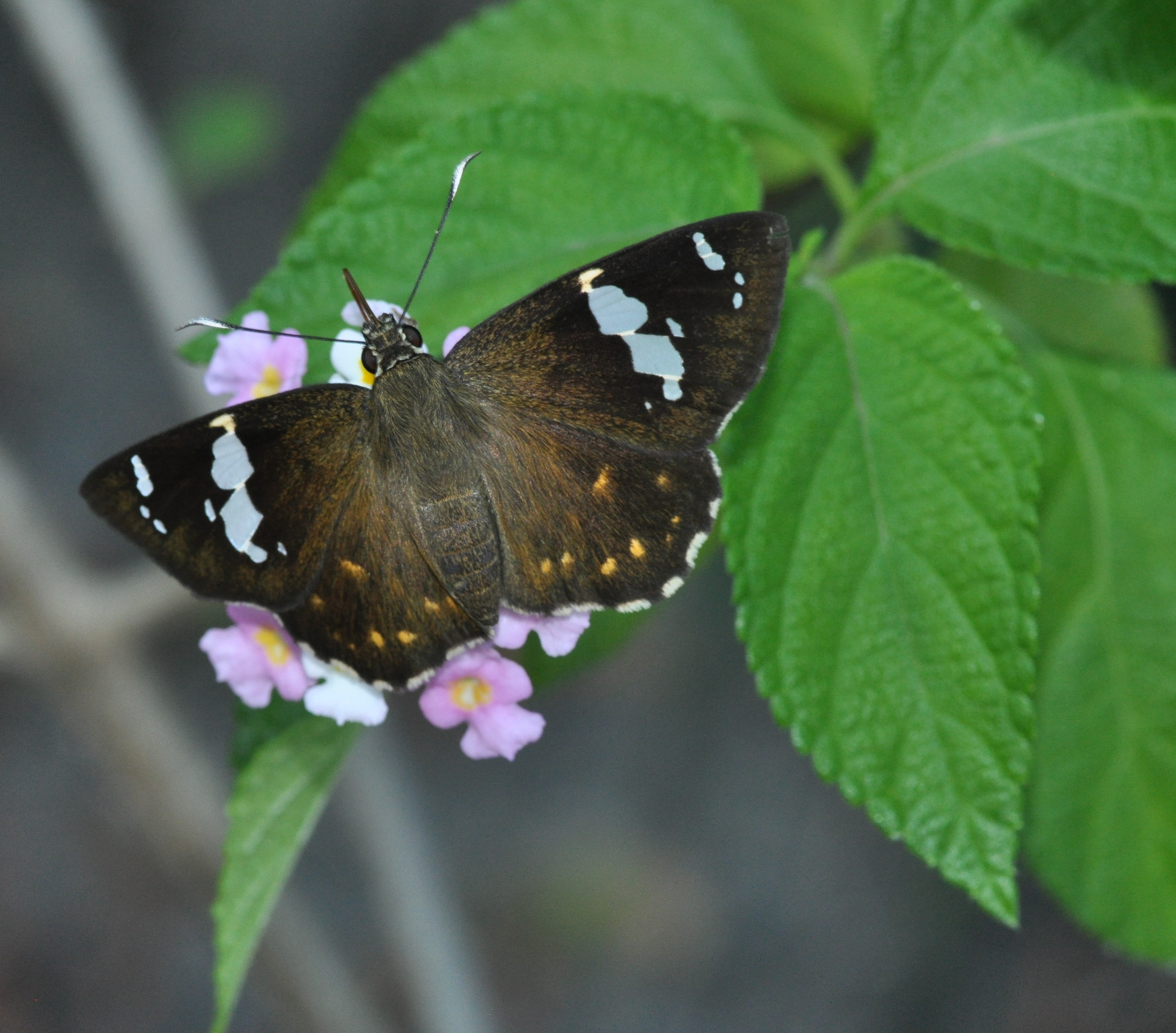
Dorsal view

==== Genus: Pseudocoladenia ====
===== Species: Pseudocoladenia dan (fulvous pied flat) =====
Subspecies: Pseudocoladenia dan fabia (Himalayan fulvous pied flat)

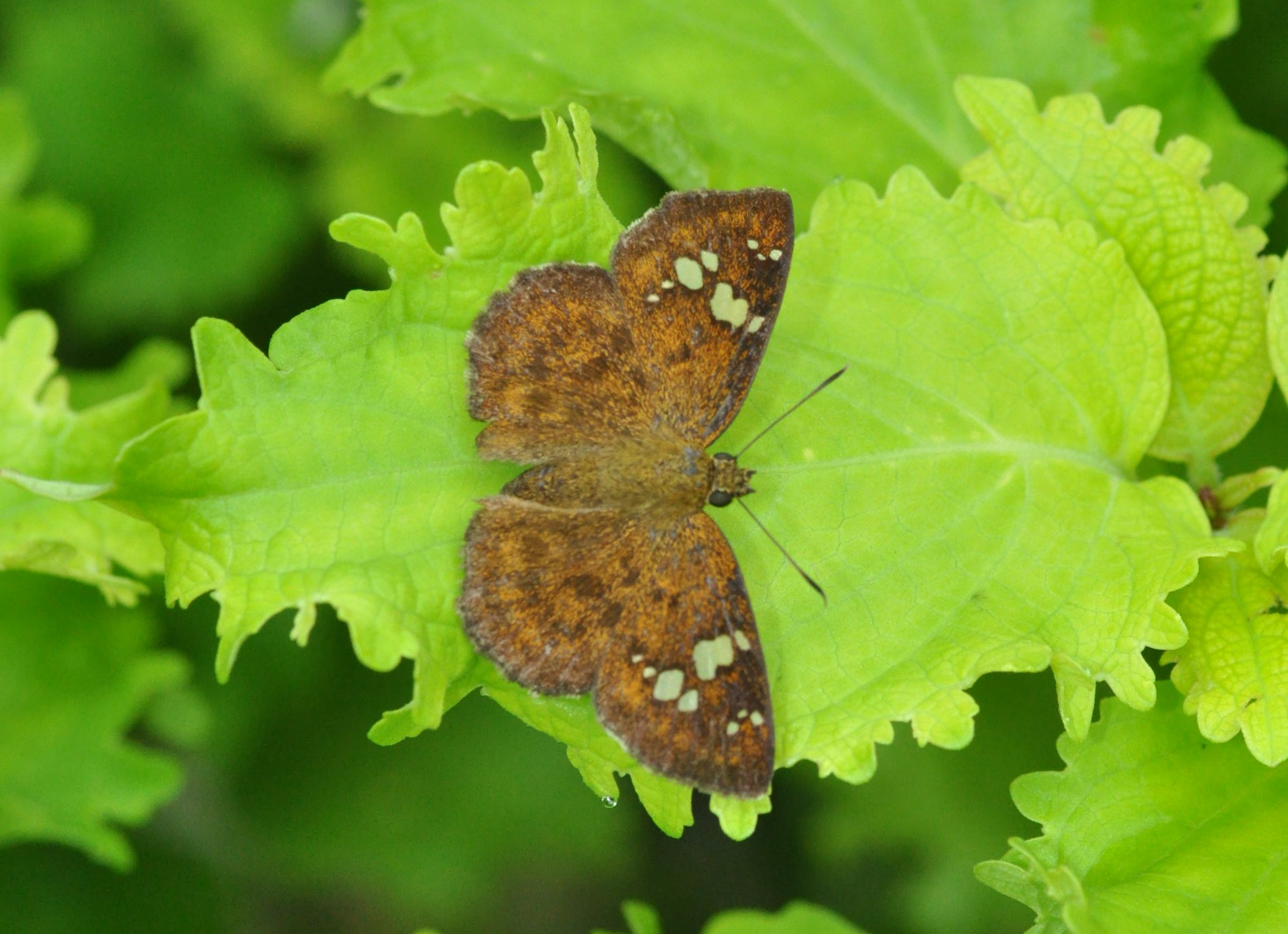
Dorsal view

==== Genus: Sarangesa ====
===== Species: Sarangesa dasahara (common small flat) =====
Subspecies: Sarangesa dasahara dasahara (Indian common small flat)

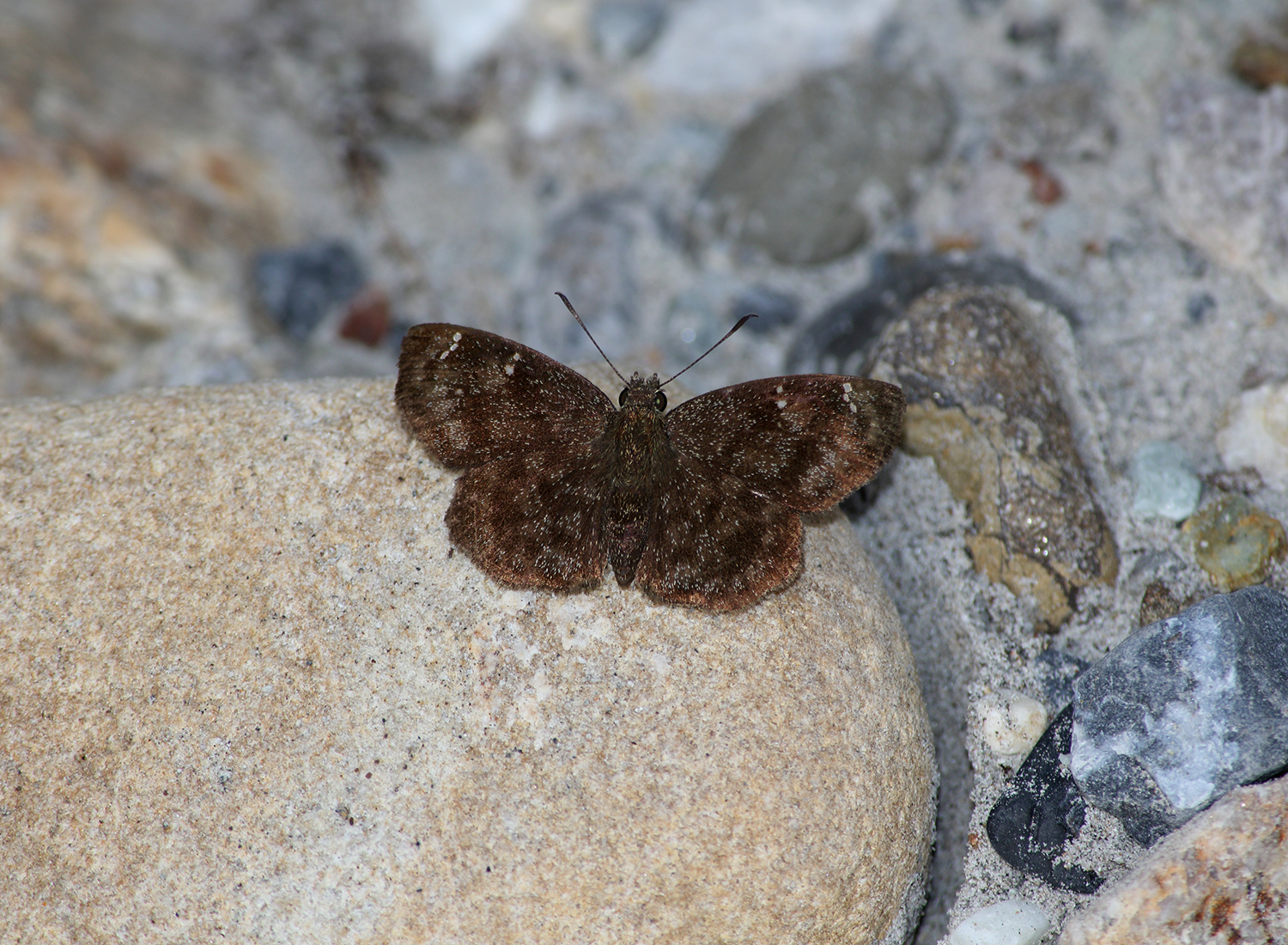
Dorsal view

Tribe: Tagiadini

==== Genus: Caprona ====
===== Species: Caprona ransonnetii (golden angle) =====
Subspecies: Caprona ransonnetii potiphera (Dakhan golden angle)

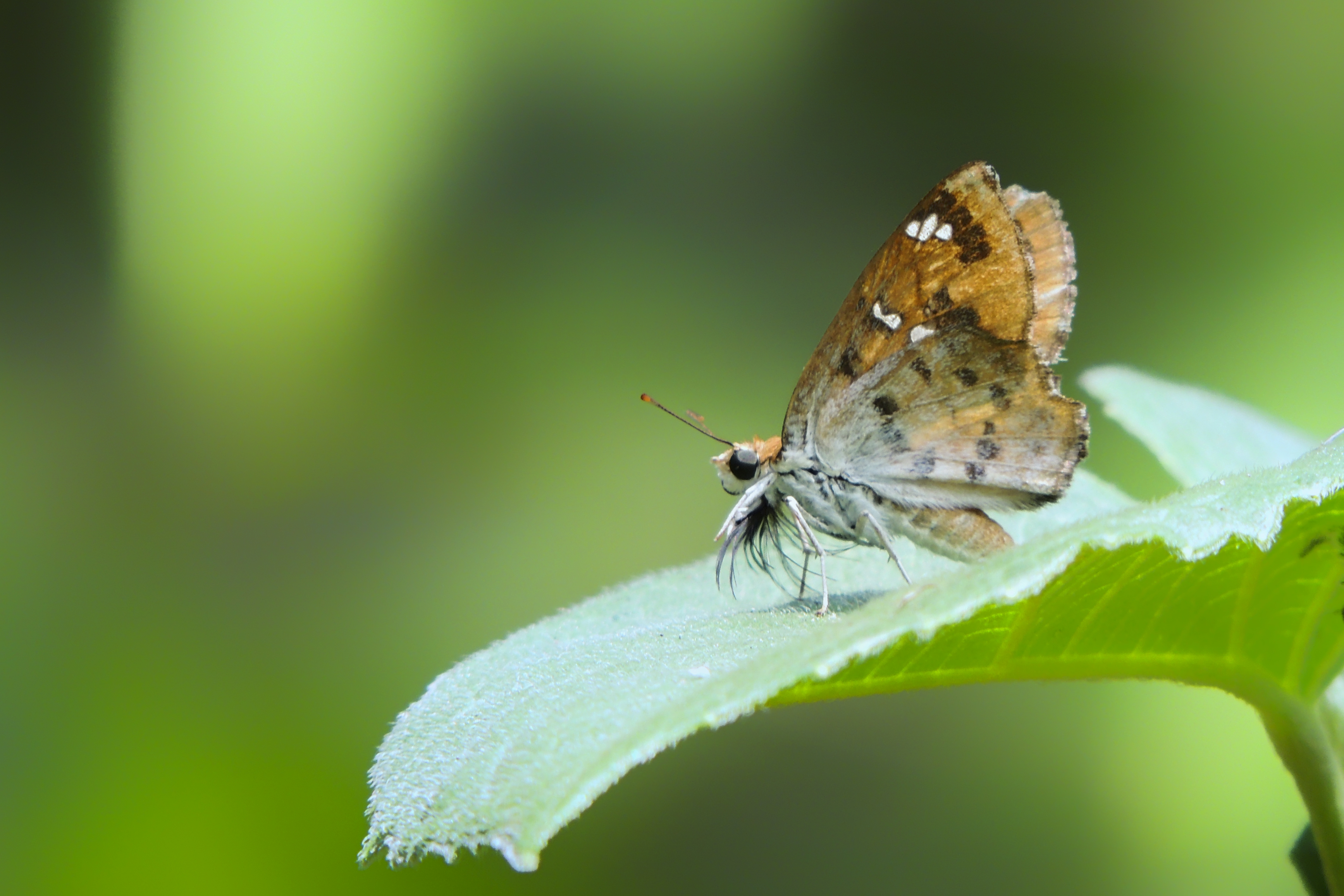
Ventral view

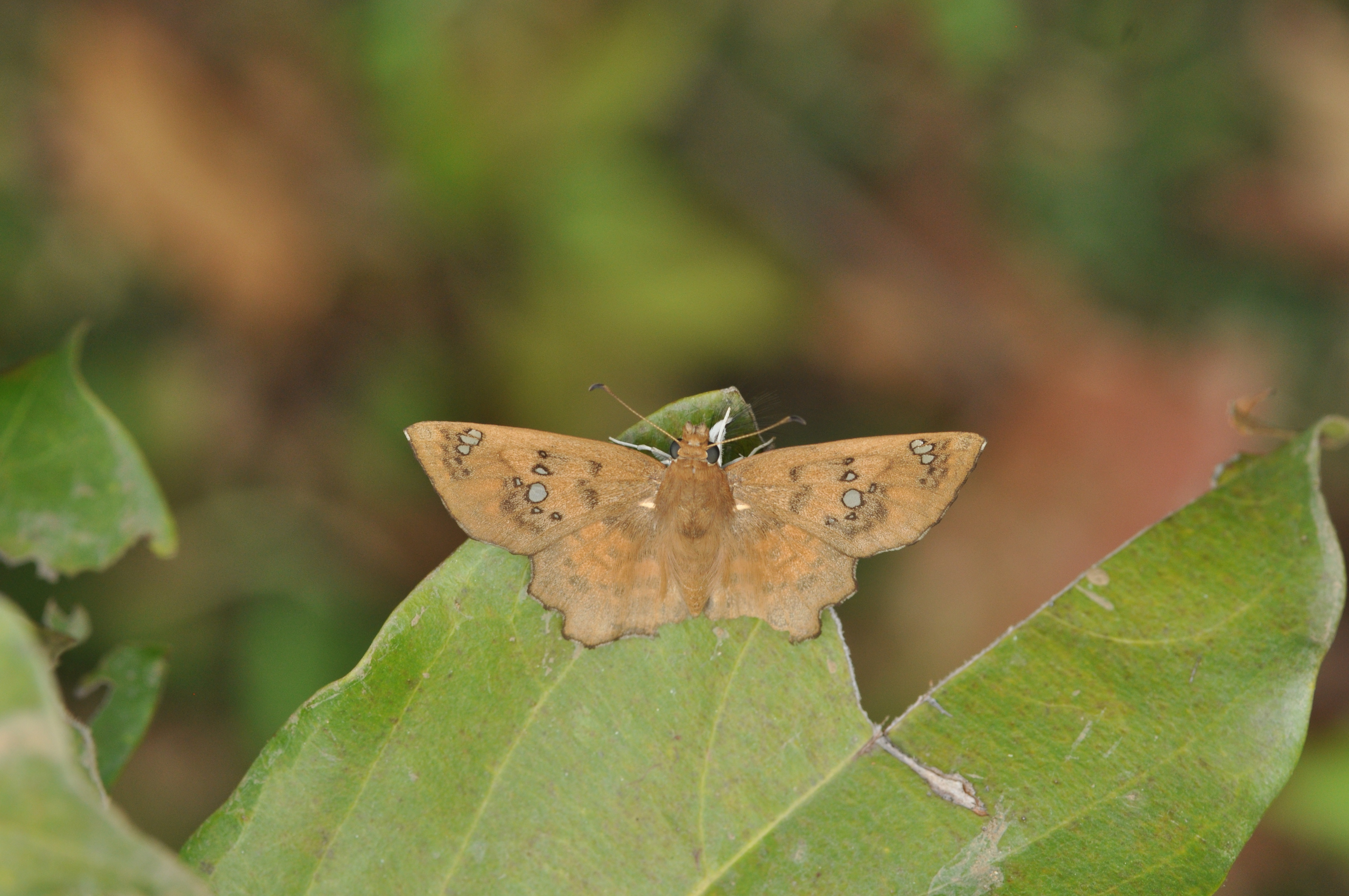
Dorsal view

==== Genus: Coladenia ====
===== Species: Coladenia agni (brown pied flat) =====
Subspecies: Coladenia agni agni (Himalayan brown pied flat)

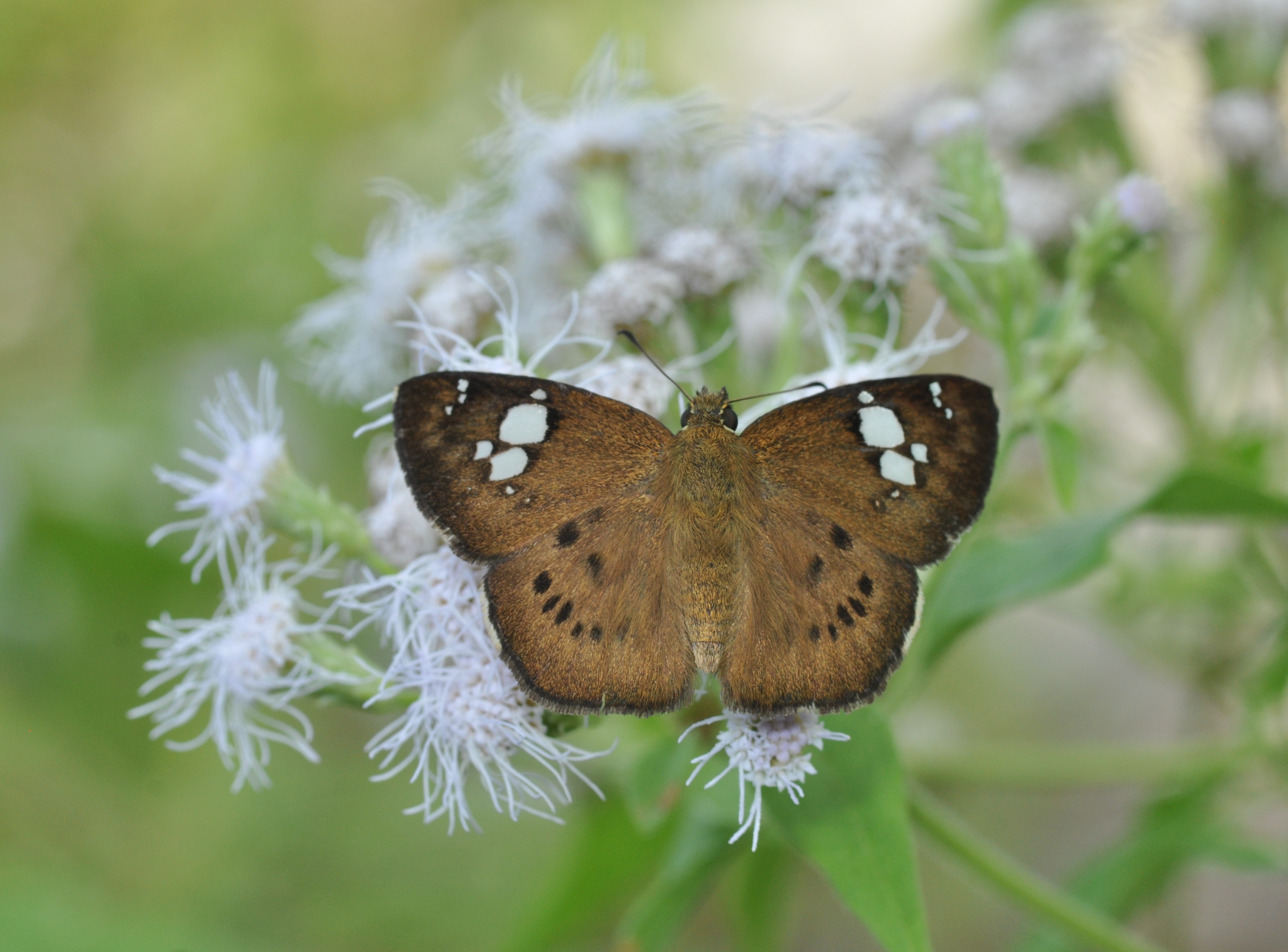
Dorsal view

==== Genus: Ctenoptilum ====
===== Species: Ctenoptilum vasava (tawny angle) =====
Subspecies: Ctenoptilum vasava vasava (Himalayan tawny angle)

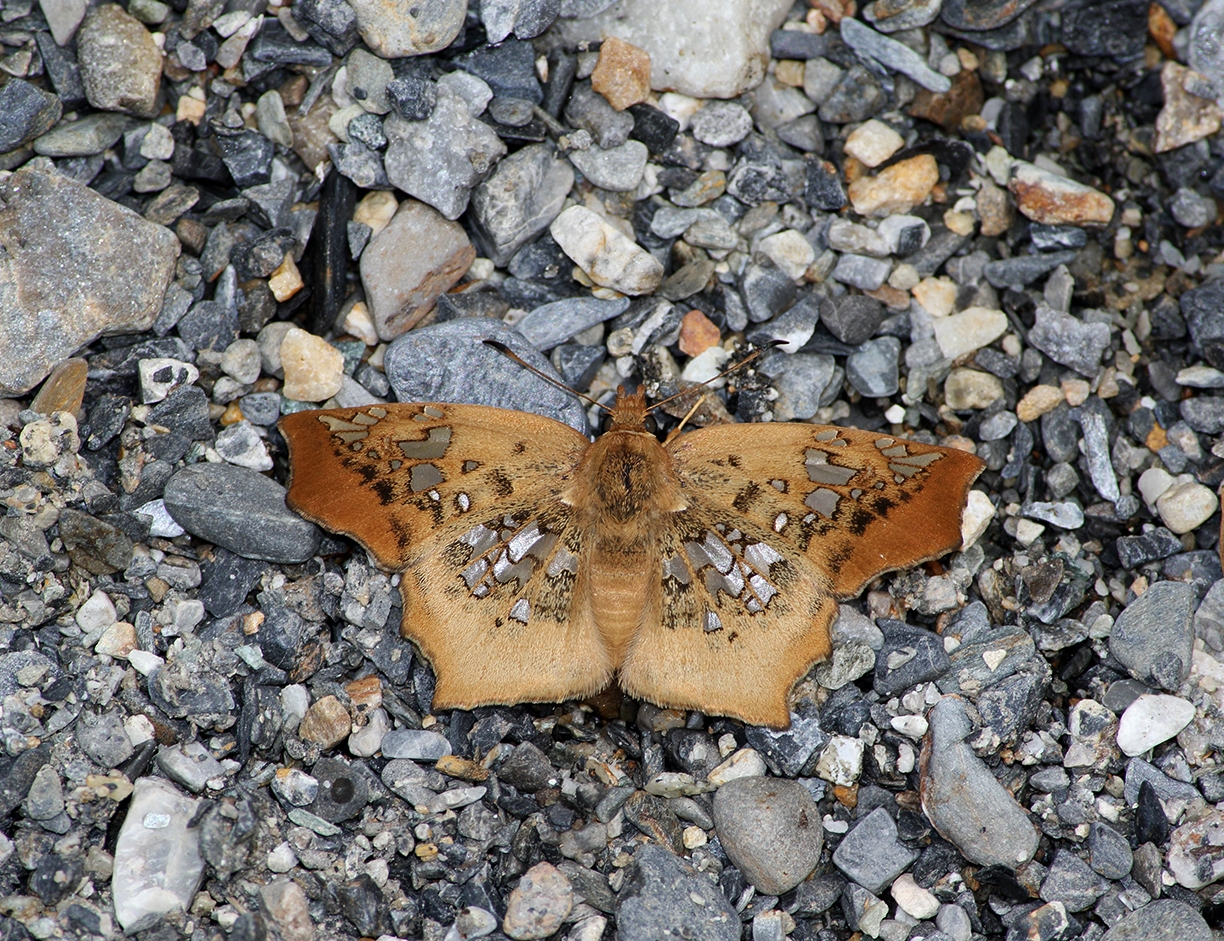
Dorsal view

==== Genus: Gerosis ====
===== Species: Gerosis phisara (dusky yellow-breast flat) =====
Subspecies: Gerosis phisara phisara (Khasi dusky yellow-breast flat)

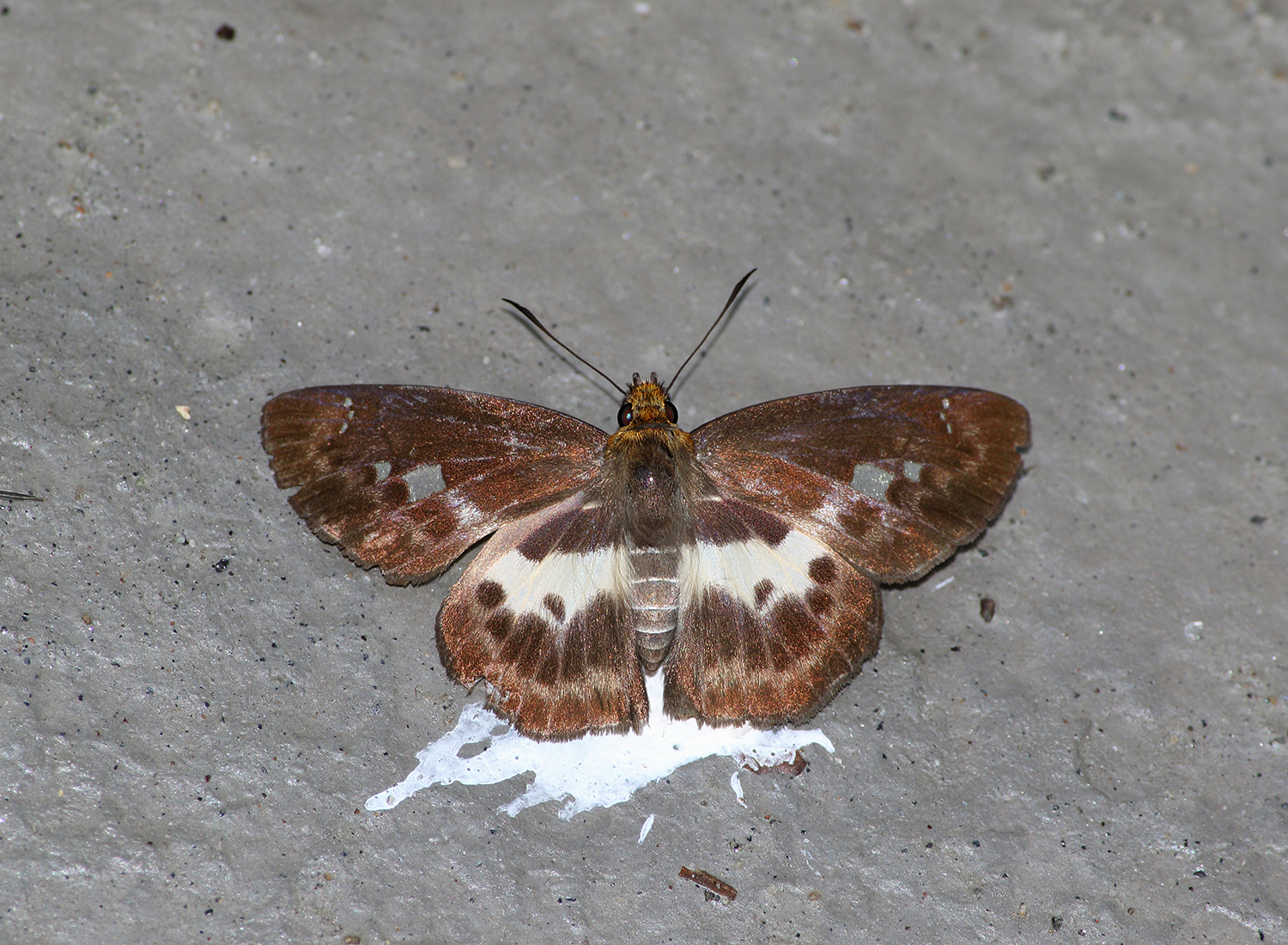
Dorsal view

==== Genus: Mooreana ====
===== Species: Mooreana trichoneura (yellow flat) =====
Subspecies: Mooreana trichoneura pralaya (yellow-veined flat)

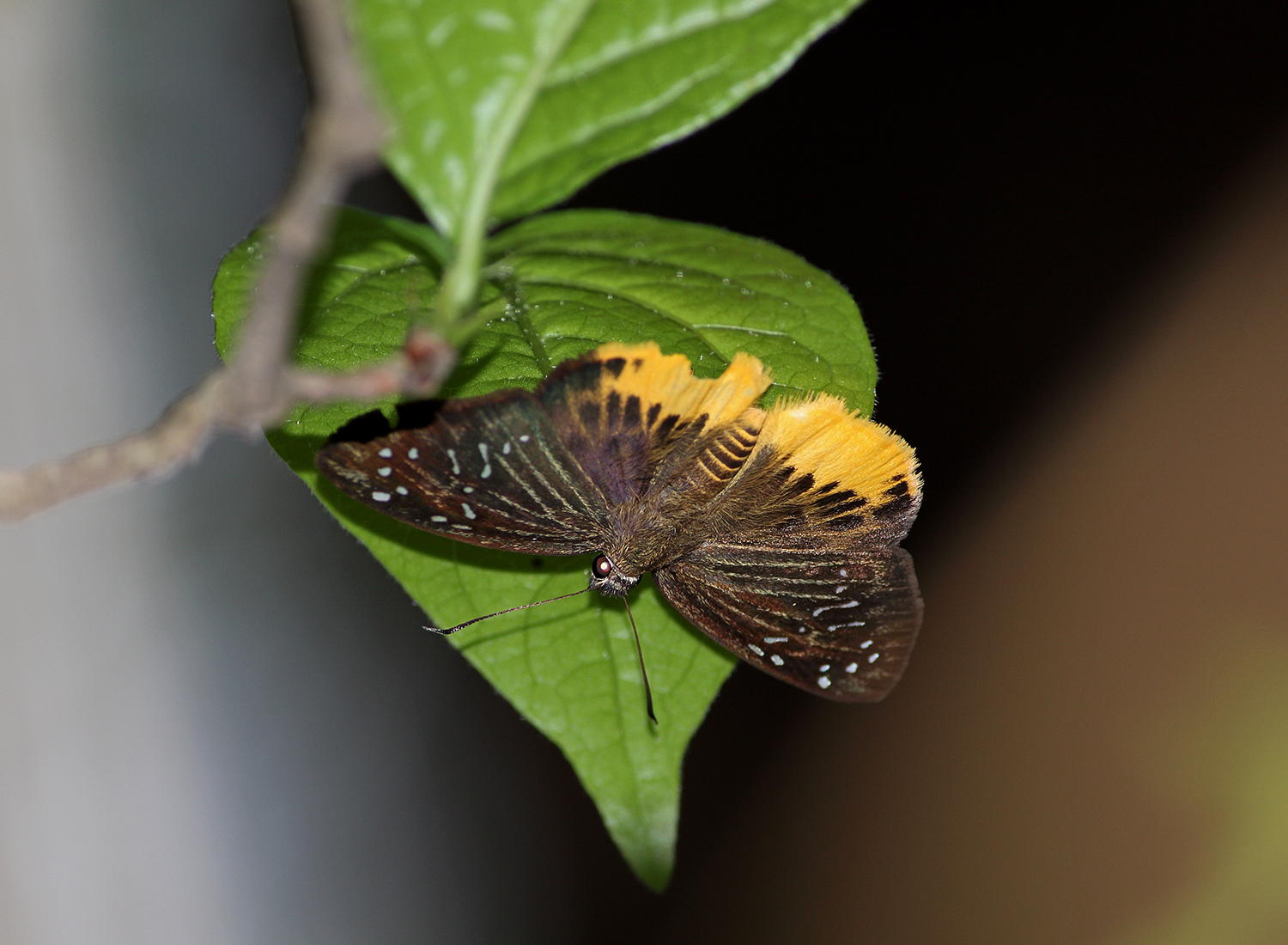
Dorsal view

==== Genus: Odontoptilum ====
===== Species: Odontoptilum angulata (chestnut angle) =====
Subspecies: Odontoptilum angulata angulata (Oriental chestnut angle)

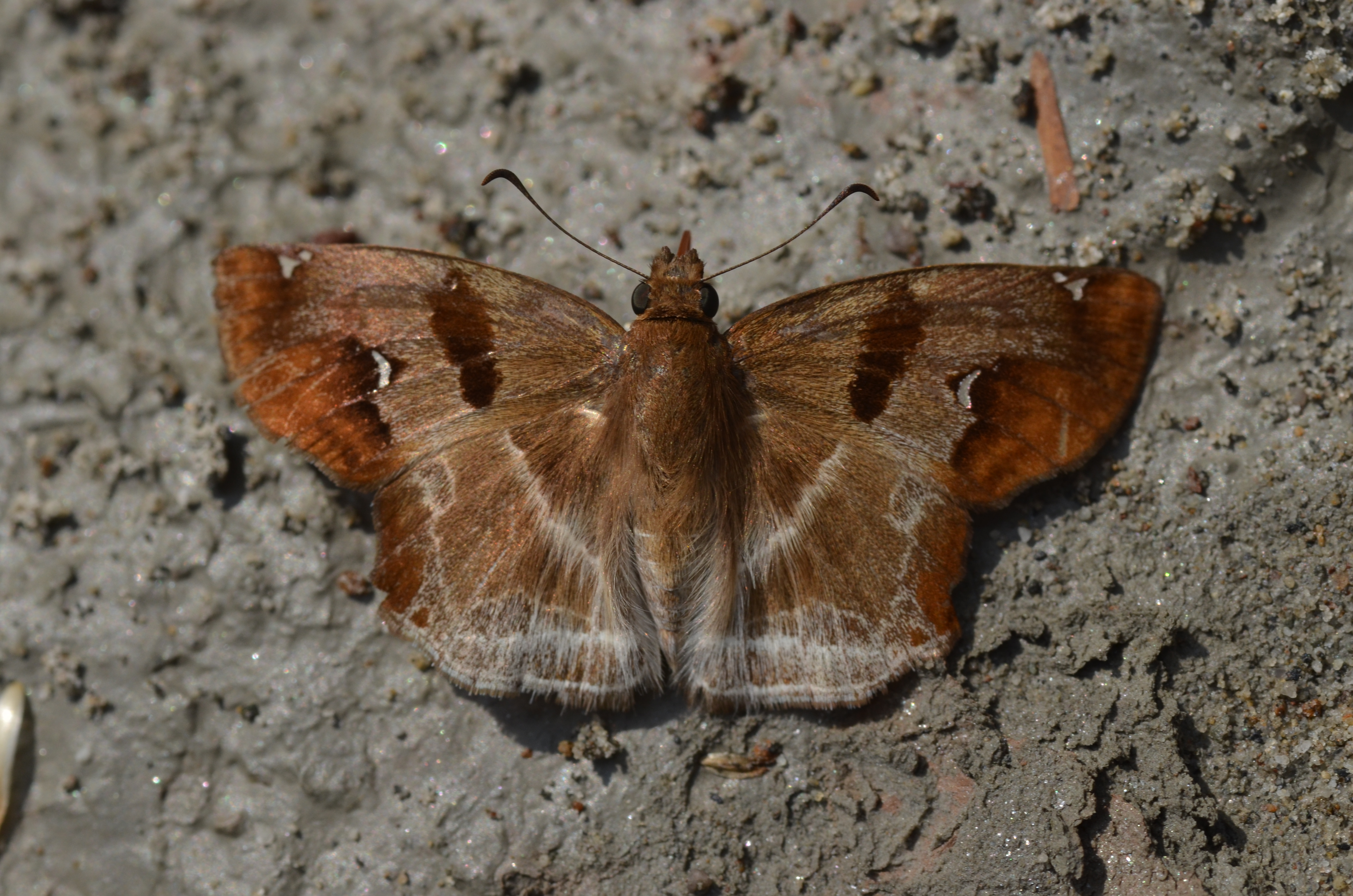
Dorsal view

==== Genus: Seseria ====
===== Species: Seseria dohertyi (contiguous seseria) =====
Subspecies: Seseria dohertyi dohertyi (Himalayan contiguous seseria or Himalayan white flat)

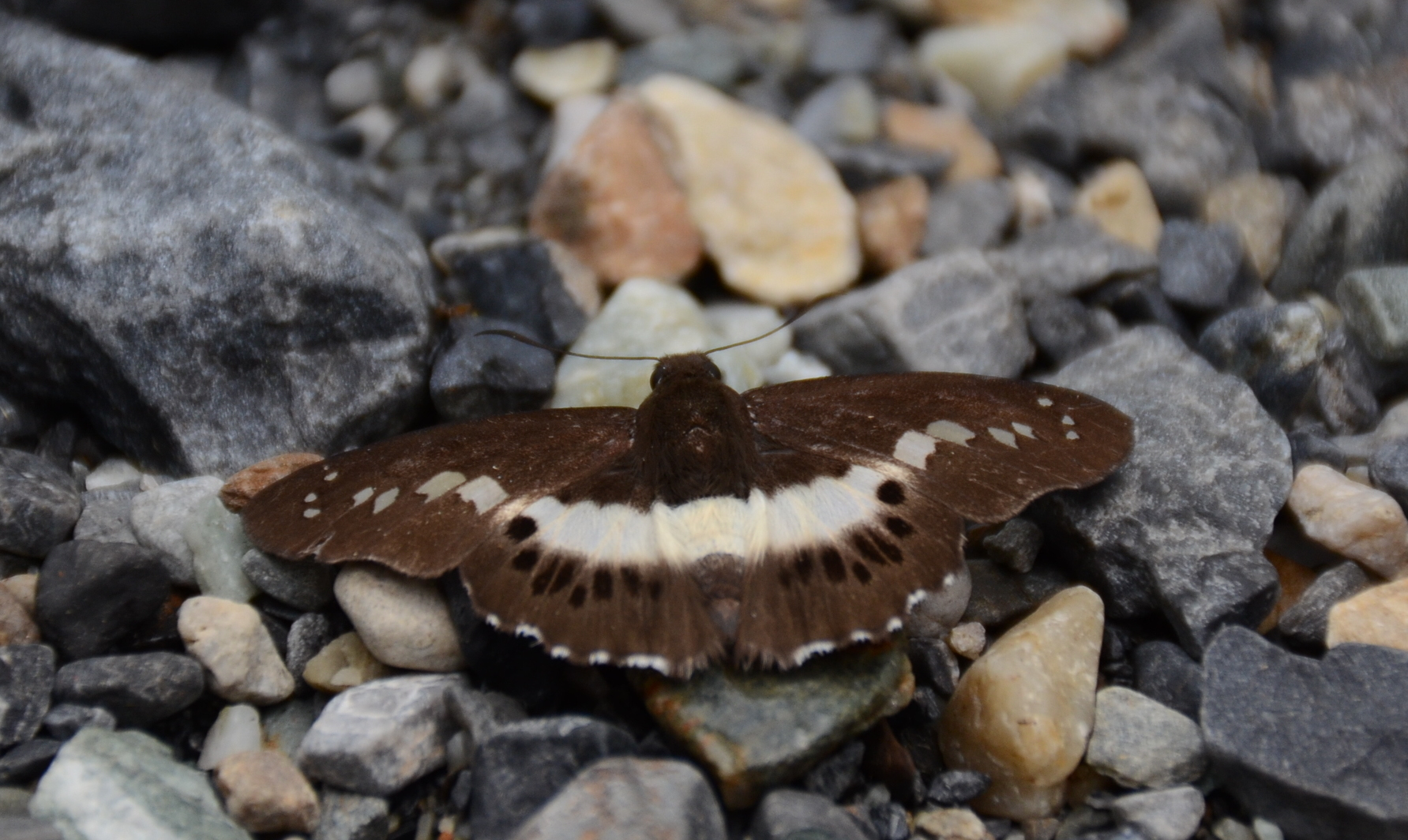
Dorsal view

===== Species: Seseria sambara (notched seseria) =====
Subspecies: Seseria sambara sambara (Himalayan notched seseria or Sikkim white flat)

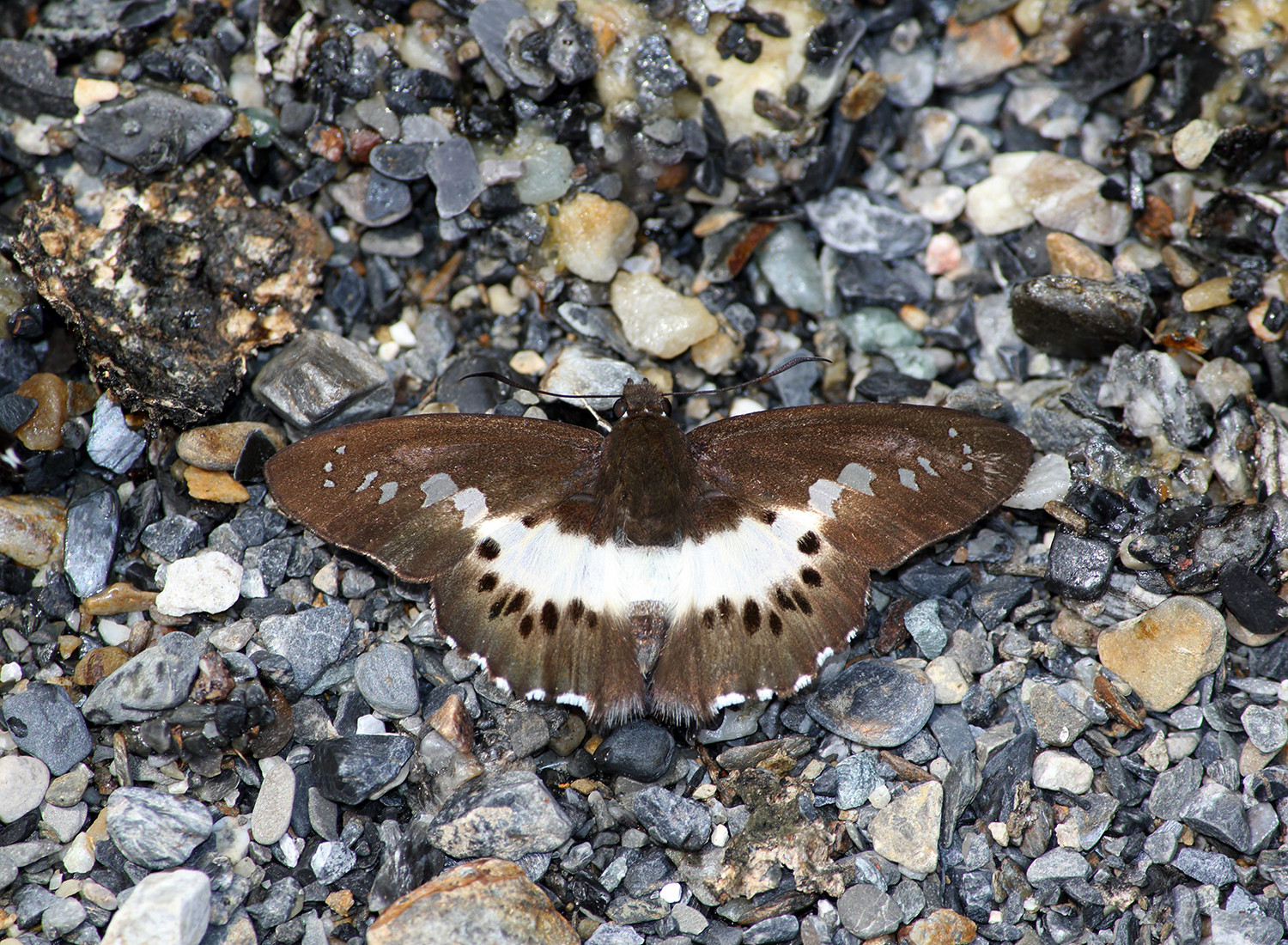
Dorsal view

==== Genus: Tagiades ====
===== Species: Tagiades japetus (common snow flat) =====
Subspecies: Tagiades japetus ravi (Himalayan common snow flat)

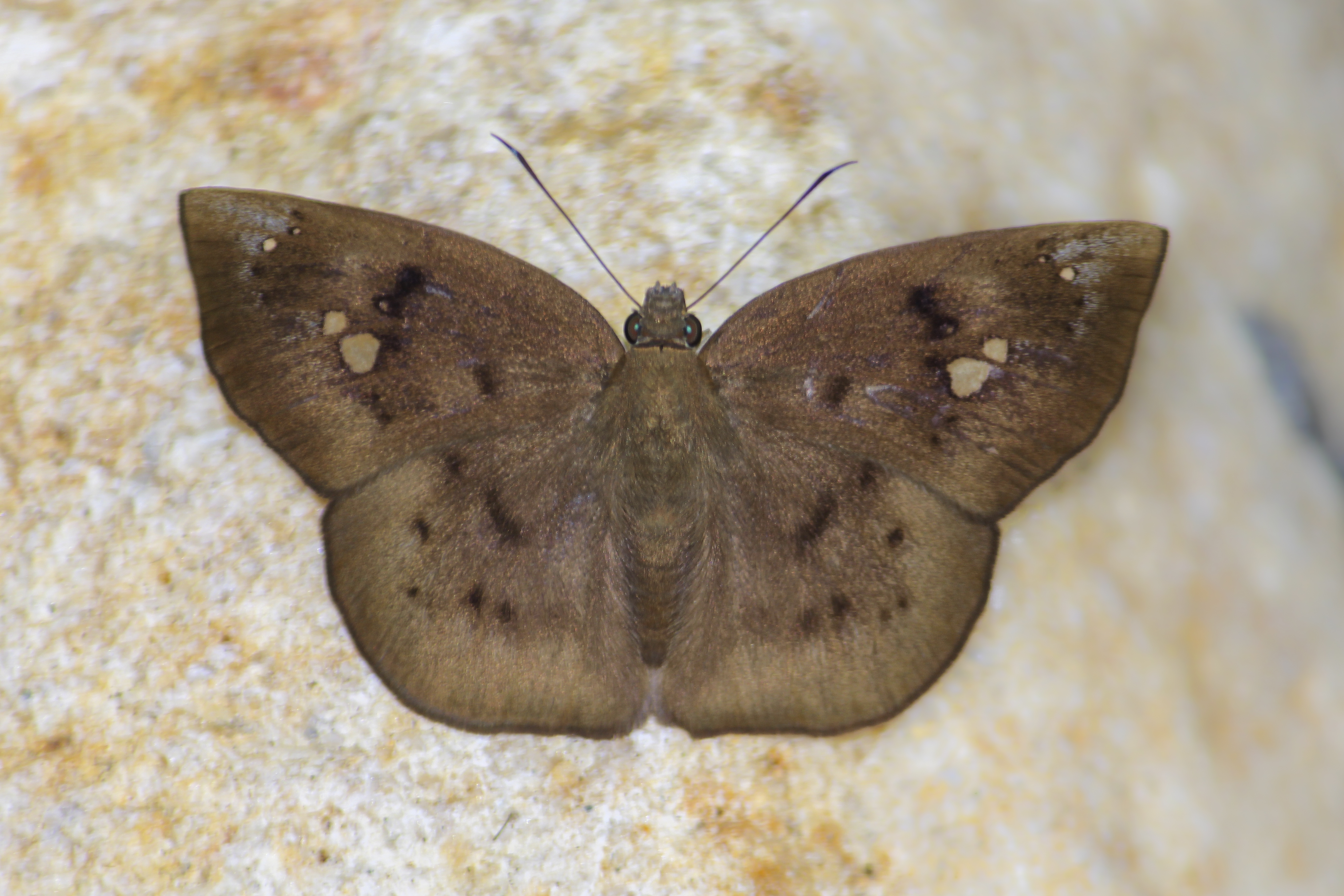
Dorsal view

== See also ==
- Butterfly
- List of butterflies of India
