= List of lycaenid genera: D =

The large butterfly family Lycaenidae contains the following genera starting with the letter D:

- Dacalana
- Danis
- Dapidodigma
- Decussata
- Deloneura
- Deramas
- Deudorix
- Dicya
- Diminutina
- Discolampa
- Dolymorpha
- Drina
- Drupadia
- Durbania
- Durbaniella
- Durbaniopsis
