= Decussata =

Decussata may refer to:

- Decussata (alga), a diatom genus in the family Naviculaceae
- Decussata (butterfly), a butterfly genus in the family Lycaenidae
