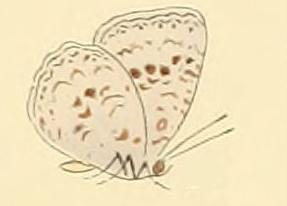

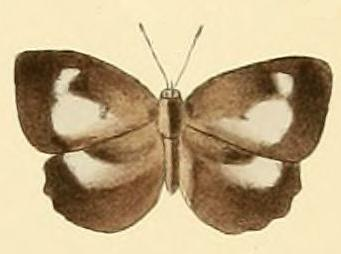

Scientific classification
- Kingdom: Animalia
- Phylum: Arthropoda
- Class: Insecta
- Order: Lepidoptera
- Family: Lycaenidae
- Genus: Cyaniriodes
- Species: C. libna

Binomial name
- Cyaniriodes libna (Hewitson, 1869)

Synonyms
- Hypolycaena libna Hewitson, 1869; Logania andersonii Moore, 1884

= Cyaniriodes libna =

Species of butterfly

Cyaniriodes libna is a species of butterfly of the family Lycaenidae. It is found in South-East Asia.Above more lustrous green than blue, the black marginal band in the forewing equally broad, not as in phakos broader in the apical portion, but in the hindwing it is broader in the anal portion. Beneath white strewn with small dark fine dots and hooks.

== Subspecies ==
- C. l. libna (Borneo)
- C. l. andersonii (Moore, 1884) (southern Burma, Mergui, Thailand, Peninsular Malaya, Langkawi)
- C. l. klossi Riley [1945] (Indonesia: Mentawi Island)
- C. l. miotsukushi Hayashi, 1976 (Philippines: Palawan)
- C. l. samarana Schröder & Treadaway, 1994 (Philippines: Samar)
- C. l. tawicolana Schröder & Treadaway, 1994 (Philippines: Tawitawi)

== Gallery ==
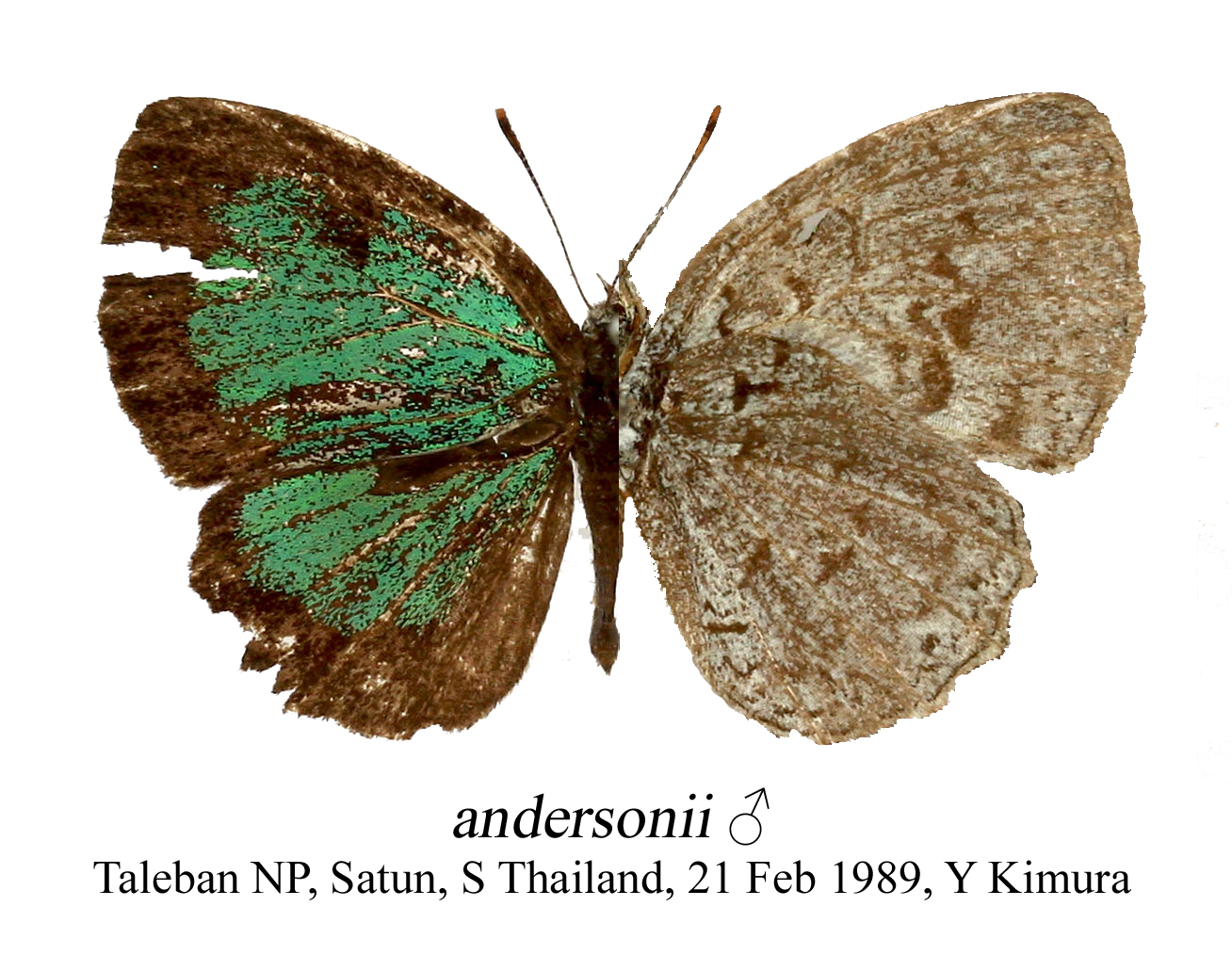
C. l. andersonii

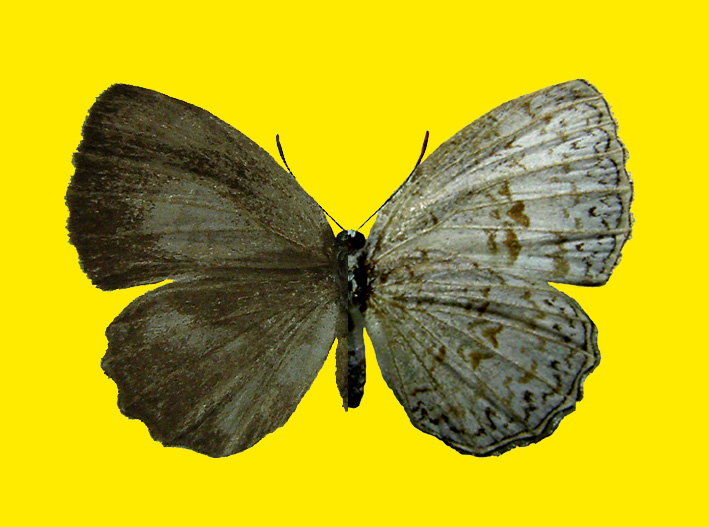
C. l. miotsukushi female

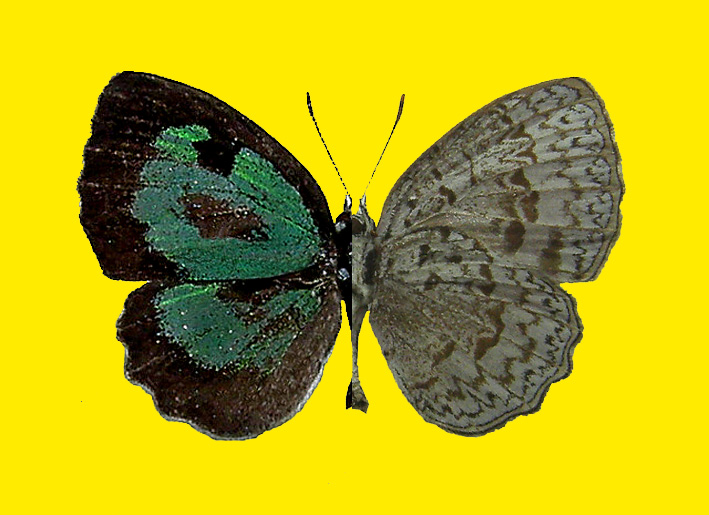
C. l. miotsukushi male
