= Congdonia =

Congonia may refer to:

- Congdonia (butterfly) Henning & Henning, 2004, a genus of insects in the family Lycaenidae
- Congdonia Jeps. (1925), a genus of plants in the family Crassulaceae, currently treated as a synonym of Sedum
- Congdonia Müll.Arg. (1876), a genus of plants in the family Rubiaceae, currently treated as a synonym of Declieuxia
