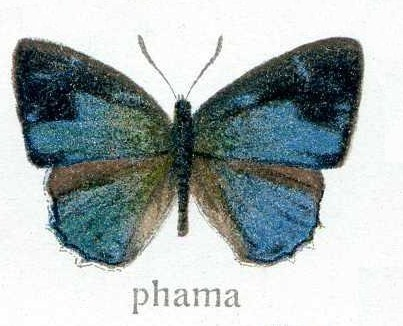
- Poritia phama

Scientific classification
- Domain: Eukaryota
- Kingdom: Animalia
- Phylum: Arthropoda
- Class: Insecta
- Order: Lepidoptera
- Superfamily: Papilionoidea
- Family: Lycaenidae
- Subfamily: Poritiinae; Doherty, 1886

= Poritiinae =

Subfamily of insects

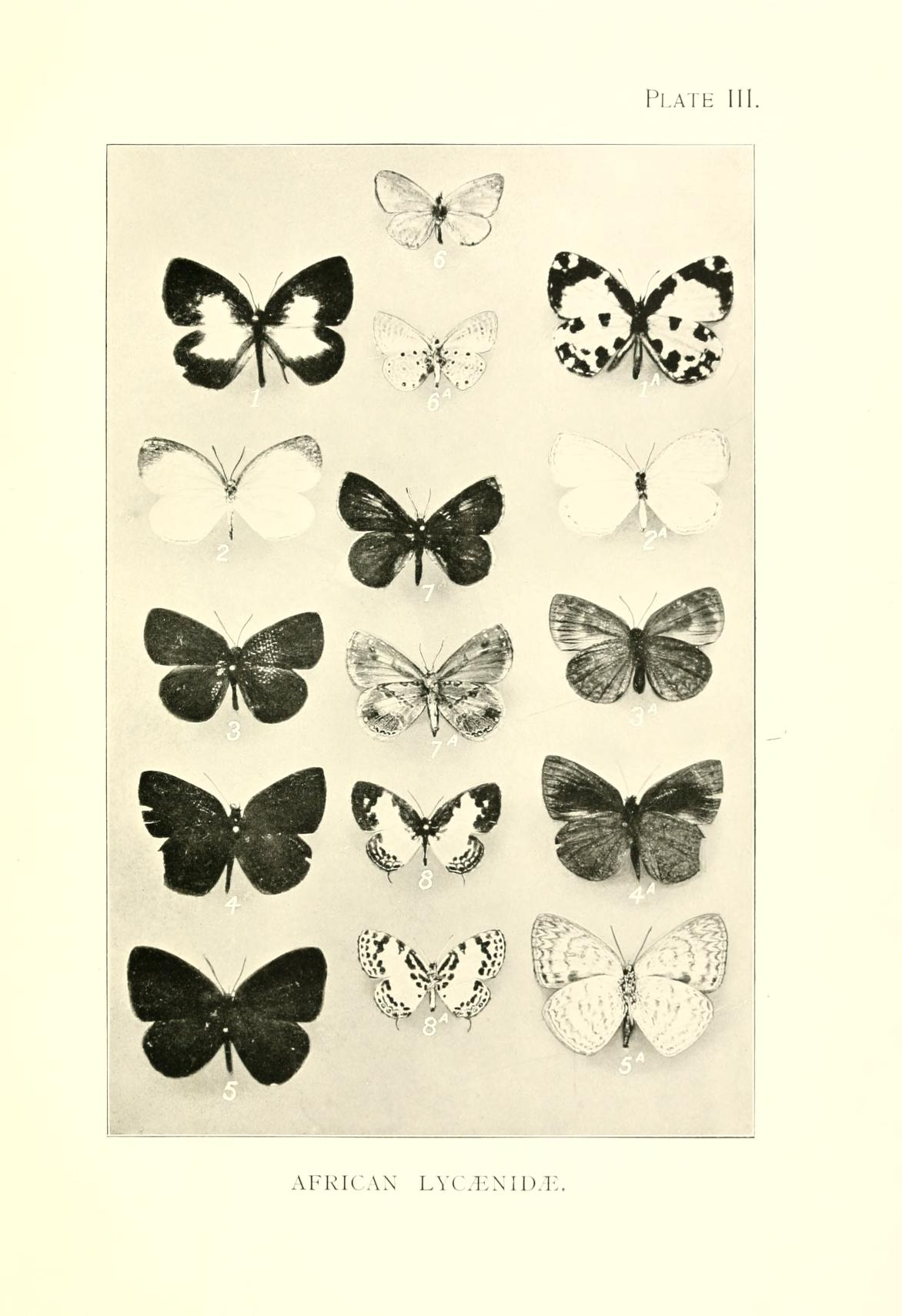
Plate from Hamilton Herbert Druce's Illustrations of African Lycaenidae, figures 1-4: Falcuna, Liptena, Cephetola and Geritola are Poritiinae

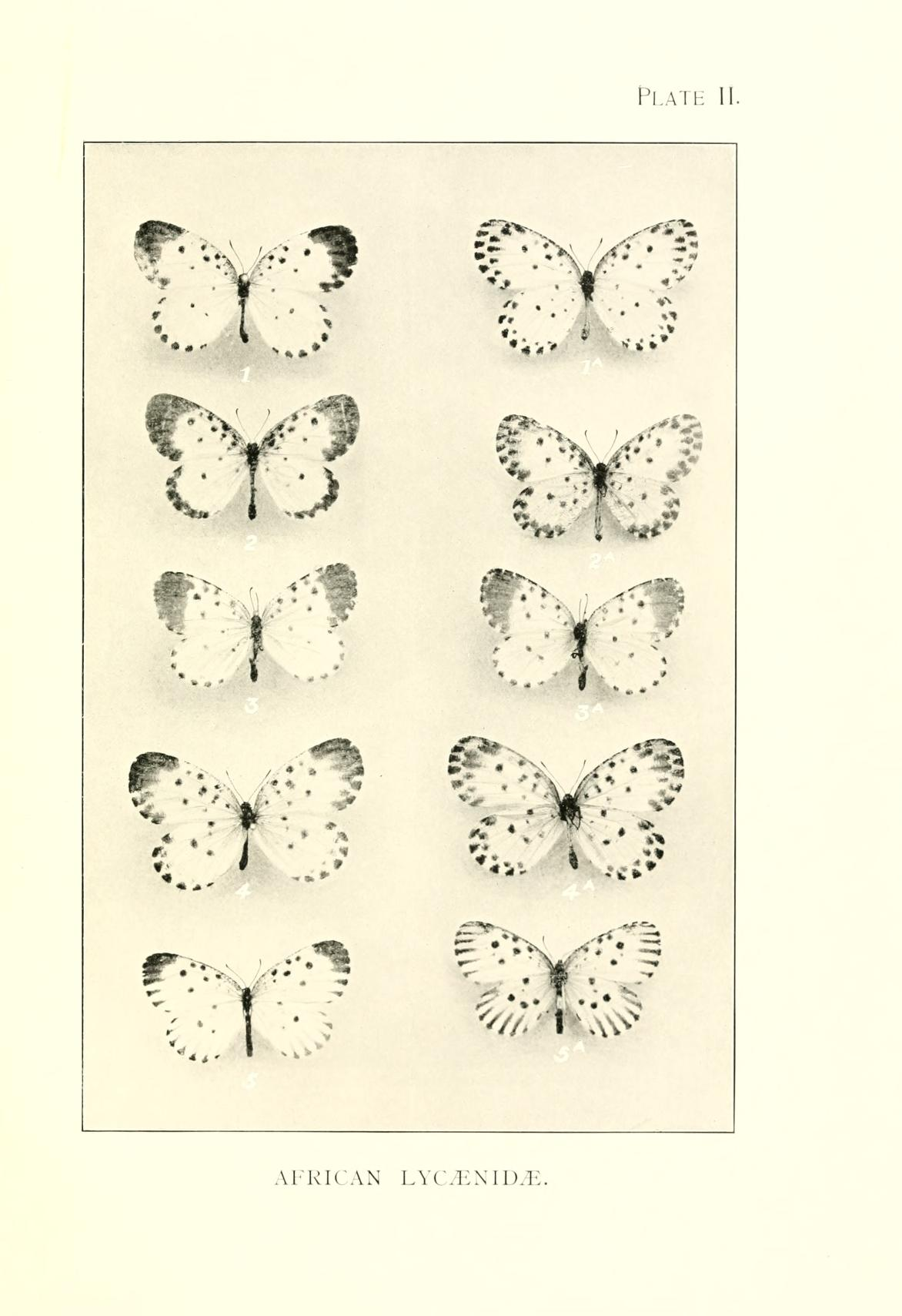
Plate from Illustrations of African Lycaenidae genus Pentila

Poritiinae is a subfamily of butterflies, the larvae of which are unusual for feeding on algae and foliate lichen.

== Systematics ==
- Tribe Poritiini - Oriental
  - Cyaniriodes de Nicéville, 1890 (sometimes placed in Lycaeninae)
  - Poriskina Druce, 1895
  - Poritia Moore, 1886
  - Simiskina Distant, 1886
  - Deramas Distant, 1886
- Tribe Liptenini - Afrotropical (sometimes ranked as a subfamily: Lipteninae)
  - Subtribe Pentilina
    - Alaena Boisduval, 1847
    - Ptelina Clench, 1965
    - Telipna Aurivillius, 1895
    - Liptenara Bethune-Baker, 1915
    - Pentila Westwood, 1851
    - Ornipholidotos Bethune-Baker, 1914
    - Torbenia Libert, 2000
  - Subtribe Durbaniina
    - Durbania Trimen, 1862
    - Durbaniella van Son, 1959
    - Durbaniopsis van Son, 1959
  - Subtribe Mimacraeina
    - Cooksonia Druce, 1905
    - Mimacraea Butler, 1872
    - Mimeresia Stempffer, 1961
  - Subtribe Liptenina
    - Pseuderesia Butler, 1874
    - Teriomima Kirby, 1887
    - Euthecta Bennett, 1954
    - Baliochila Stempffer & Bennett, 1953
    - Cnodontes Stempffer & Bennett, 1953
    - Congdonia Henning & Henning, 2004
    - Eresinopsides Strand, 1911
    - Eresina Aurivillius, 1898
    - Toxochitona Stempffer, 1956
    - Argyrocheila Staudinger, 1892
    - Citrinophila Kirby, 1887
    - Liptena Westwood, 1851
    - Obania Collins & Larsen, 1998
    - Kakumia Collins & Larsen, 1998
    - Falcuna Stempffer & Bennett, 1963
    - Tetrarhanis Karsch, 1893
    - Larinopoda Butler, 1871
    - Micropentila Aurivillius, 1895
  - Subtribe Epitolina
    - Epitola Westwood, 1851
    - Cerautola Libert, 1999
    - Geritola Libert, 1999
    - Stempfferia Jackson, 1962
    - Cephetola Libert, 1999
    - Deloneura Trimen, 1868
    - Batelusia Druce, 1910
    - Tumerepedes Bethune-Baker, 1913
    - Pseudoneaveia Stempffer, 1964
    - Neaveia Druce, 1910
    - Epitolina Aurivillius, 1895
    - Hypophytala Clench, 1965
    - Phytala Westwood, 1851
    - Neoepitola Jackson, 1964
    - Aethiopana Bethune-Baker, 1915
    - Hewitsonia Kirby, 1871
    - Powellana Bethune-Baker, 1908
    - Iridana Aurivillius, 1921
    - Teratoneura Dudgeon, 1909
