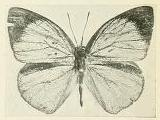

Scientific classification
- Domain: Eukaryota
- Kingdom: Animalia
- Phylum: Arthropoda
- Class: Insecta
- Order: Lepidoptera
- Family: Lycaenidae
- Genus: Epitola
- Species: E. urania

Binomial name
- Epitola urania Kirby, 1887

Synonyms
- Epitola urania tanganikensis Joicey and Talbot, 1921

= Epitola urania =

Species of butterfly

Epitola urania, the purple giant epitola, is a butterfly in the family Lycaenidae. It is found in Sierra Leone, Liberia, Ivory Coast, Ghana, Togo, Nigeria (south and the Cross River loop), Cameroon, Gabon, the Republic of the Congo, the Central African Republic, Angola, the Democratic Republic of the Congo and Uganda.
