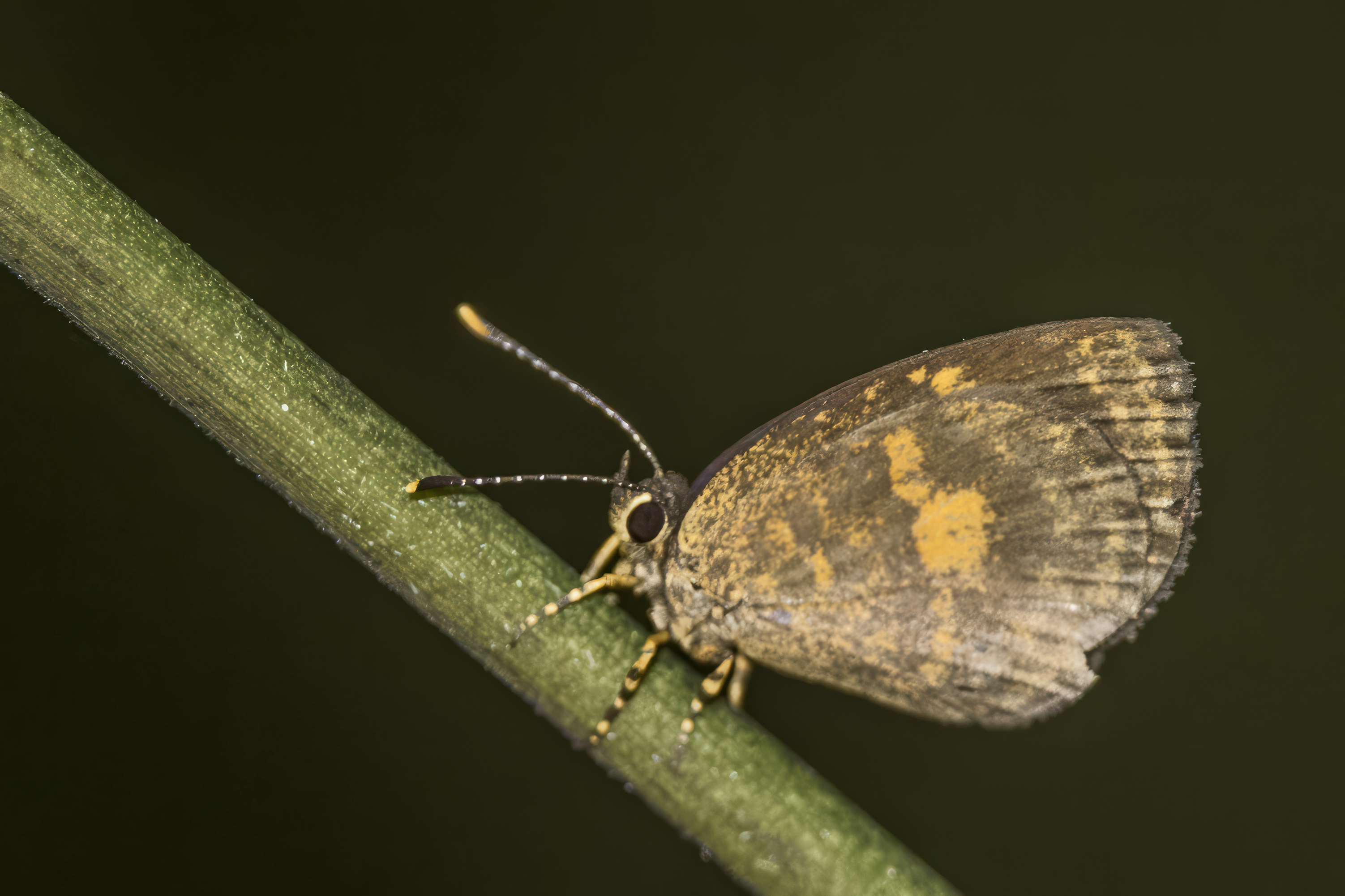
- female in Ghana

Scientific classification
- Kingdom: Animalia
- Phylum: Arthropoda
- Clade: Pancrustacea
- Class: Insecta
- Order: Lepidoptera
- Family: Lycaenidae
- Genus: Epitolina
- Species: E. dispar

Binomial name
- Epitolina dispar (Kirby, 1887)

Synonyms
- Teriomima dispar Kirby, 1887; Liptena mnestra Möschler, 1887; Teriomima dubia Kirby, 1890

= Epitolina dispar =

Species of butterfly

Epitolina dispar, the common epitolina, is a butterfly in the family Lycaenidae. It is found in Guinea, Sierra Leone, Liberia, Ivory Coast, Ghana, Togo, Nigeria (south and the Cross River loop), Cameroon, Equatorial Guinea, Gabon, the Republic of the Congo, the Central African Republic, Angola, the Democratic Republic of the Congo (Katako-Kombe and Sankuru), Uganda and north-western Tanzania. Its habitat consists of primary and secondary forests.

Adults have been recorded feeding from the secretions of ant-attended coccids.

Torben Larsen developed a species numbering system for his 2005 publication Butterflies of West Africa. This species is #347. The 'Larsen' numbers have since been used with permission in A Sharp Eye on Butterflies of Ghana.
