= Cyaniriodes siraspiorum =

Scientific classification
- Domain: Eukaryota
- Kingdom: Animalia
- Phylum: Arthropoda
- Class: Insecta
- Order: Lepidoptera
- Family: Lycaenidae
- Genus: Cyaniriodes
- Species: C. siraspiorum

Binomial name
- Cyaniriodes siraspiorum Schröder & Treadaway, 1979

Synonyms
- Cyaniriodes libna siraspiorum Schröder & Treadaway, 1979; Cyaniriodes siraspiorum leyte Medicielo, 1993

Species of butterfly

Cyaniriodes siraspiorum is a species of butterfly of the family Lycaenidae. It is found on Luzon and Samar in the Philippines.
