= Toxochitona ankole =

Scientific classification
- Domain: Eukaryota
- Kingdom: Animalia
- Phylum: Arthropoda
- Class: Insecta
- Order: Lepidoptera
- Family: Lycaenidae
- Genus: Toxochitona
- Species: T. ankole

Binomial name
- Toxochitona ankole Stempffer, 1967

Species of butterfly

Toxochitona ankole is a butterfly in the family Lycaenidae. It is found in Uganda (from the western part of the country to the Kibale and Kalinzu forests). The habitat consists of forests.
