= Kakumia ideoides =

Scientific classification
- Kingdom: Animalia
- Phylum: Arthropoda
- Clade: Pancrustacea
- Class: Insecta
- Order: Lepidoptera
- Family: Lycaenidae
- Genus: Kakumia
- Species: K. ideoides

Binomial name
- Kakumia ideoides (Dewitz, 1887)

Synonyms
- Liptena ideoides Dewitz, 1887; Liptena girthii Dewitz, 1887

Species of butterfly

Kakumia ideoides is a butterfly in the family Lycaenidae. It is found in Gabon, the Republic of the Congo, the Democratic Republic of the Congo (Uele, Tshopo, Sankuru and Lualaba), Uganda and western Tanzania. The habitat consists of forests at altitudes between 900 and 1,400 metres.
