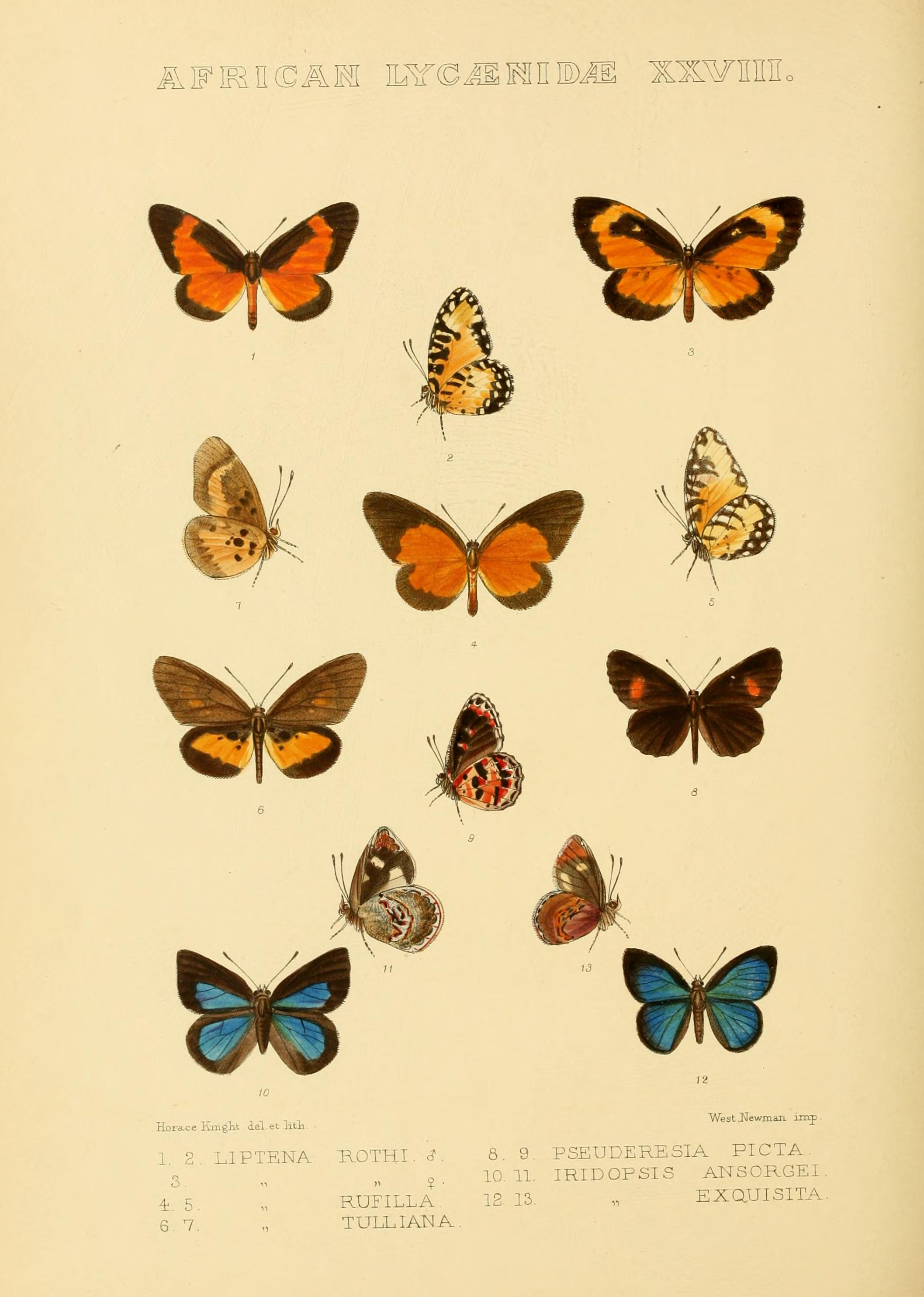
- Figures 6 and 7

Scientific classification
- Kingdom: Animalia
- Phylum: Arthropoda
- Class: Insecta
- Order: Lepidoptera
- Family: Lycaenidae
- Genus: Obania
- Species: O. tulliana

Binomial name
- Obania tulliana (Grose-Smith, 1901)

Synonyms
- Liptena tulliana Grose-Smith, 1901

= Obania tulliana =

Species of butterfly

Obania tulliana is a butterfly in the family Lycaenidae. It is found in the Democratic Republic of the Congo (Uele, North Kivu and Sankuru).
