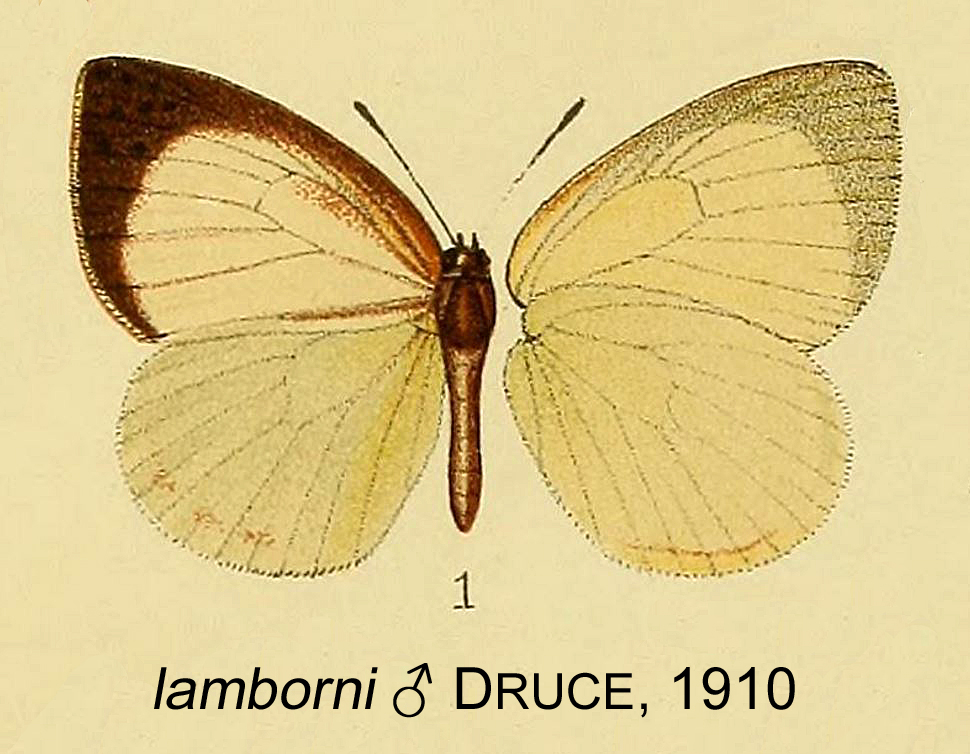

Scientific classification
- Kingdom: Animalia
- Phylum: Arthropoda
- Clade: Pancrustacea
- Class: Insecta
- Order: Lepidoptera
- Family: Lycaenidae
- Subfamily: Poritiinae
- Genus: Neaveia; H. H. Druce, 1910
- Species: N. lamborni

Binomial name
- Neaveia lamborni H. H. Druce, 1910

= Neaveia =

Monotypic butterfly genus in family Lycaenidae

Neaveia is a monotypic butterfly genus in the family Lycaenidae which is endemic to the Afrotropical realm. Its only species, Neaveia lamborni, the pierine blue, is found in Ivory Coast, Ghana, Nigeria, Cameroon, the Republic of the Congo, the Democratic Republic of the Congo, Uganda, Kenya and Tanzania. Both the genus and species were first described by Hamilton Herbert Druce in 1910. The habitat consists of forests and open areas.

== Subspecies ==
- Neaveia lamborni lamborni (Ivory Coast, Ghana, Nigeria: south and the Cross River loop, Cameroon)
- Neaveia lamborni orientalis Jackson, 1962 (Congo, Democratic Republic of the Congo: Uele, western Uganda, western Kenya, north-western Tanzania)

Torben Larsen developed a species numbering system for his 2005 publication Butterflies of West Africa. The nominate subspecies is #352. The 'Larsen' numbers have since been used with permission in A Sharp Eye on Butterflies of Ghana.
