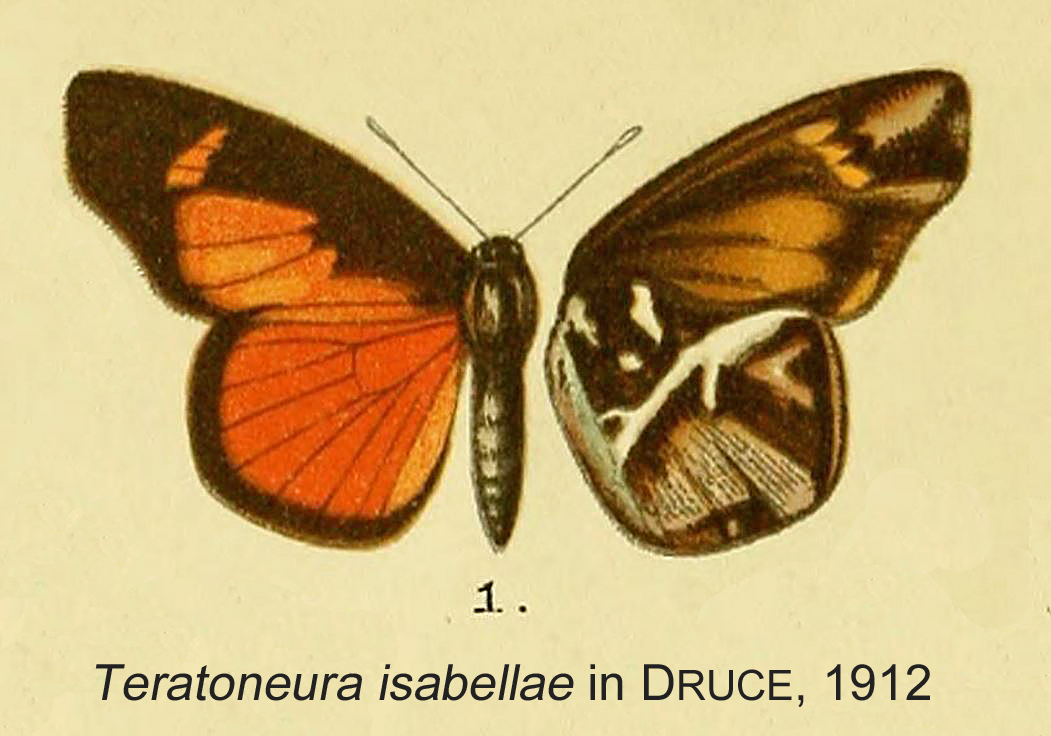
- Teratoneura isabellae

Scientific classification
- Domain: Eukaryota
- Kingdom: Animalia
- Phylum: Arthropoda
- Class: Insecta
- Order: Lepidoptera
- Family: Lycaenidae
- Subfamily: Poritiinae
- Genus: Teratoneura; Dudgeon, 1909

= Teratoneura =

Butterfly genus in family Lycaenidae

Teratoneura is a genus of butterflies in the family Lycaenidae, endemic to the Afrotropical realm.

== Species ==
- Teratoneura congoensis Stempffer, 1954
- Teratoneura isabellae Dudgeon, 1909
