= Deloneura sheppardi =

Sheppard's buff

Scientific classification
- Kingdom: Animalia
- Phylum: Arthropoda
- Class: Insecta
- Order: Lepidoptera
- Family: Lycaenidae
- Genus: Deloneura
- Species: D. sheppardi

Binomial name
- Deloneura sheppardi Stevenson, 1934

Species of butterfly

Deloneura sheppardi, the Sheppard's buff, is a butterfly in the family Lycaenidae. It is found in eastern Zimbabwe and western Mozambique. Larvae have a blue body and a brown head, and adults are primarily on wing in March and April.
