= Pseudoneaveia =

Scientific classification
- Kingdom: Animalia
- Phylum: Arthropoda
- Class: Insecta
- Order: Lepidoptera
- Family: Lycaenidae
- Subfamily: Poritiinae
- Genus: Pseudoneaveia; Stempffer, 1964
- Species: P. jacksoni

Binomial name
- Pseudoneaveia jacksoni Stempffer, 1964

Monotypic butterfly genus in family Lycaenidae

Pseudoneaveia is a genus of butterflies in the family Lycaenidae, endemic to the Afrotropical realm. It consists of only one species, Pseudoneaveia jacksoni, which is found in the Republic of the Congo.
