= Deloneura subfusca =

Dusky buff

Scientific classification
- Kingdom: Animalia
- Phylum: Arthropoda
- Class: Insecta
- Order: Lepidoptera
- Family: Lycaenidae
- Genus: Deloneura
- Species: D. subfusca

Binomial name
- Deloneura subfusca Hawker-Smith, 1933

Synonyms
- Deloneura innesi van Son, 1949

Species of butterfly

Deloneura subfusca, the dusky buff, is a butterfly in the family Lycaenidae. It is found in the Democratic Republic of the Congo (from the southern part of the country to Lualaba), Tanzania (from the south-west to Mpanda), Zambia, Malawi and Zimbabwe (the Harare district). Its habitat consists of woodland.
