= Epitolina larseni =

Scientific classification
- Domain: Eukaryota
- Kingdom: Animalia
- Phylum: Arthropoda
- Class: Insecta
- Order: Lepidoptera
- Family: Lycaenidae
- Genus: Epitolina
- Species: E. larseni

Binomial name
- Epitolina larseni Libert, 2000

Species of butterfly

Epitolina larseni, the Larsen's epitolina, is a butterfly in the family Lycaenidae. It is found in eastern Nigeria, Cameroon, Gabon, the Republic of the Congo and the Central African Republic. Its habitat consists of forests.
