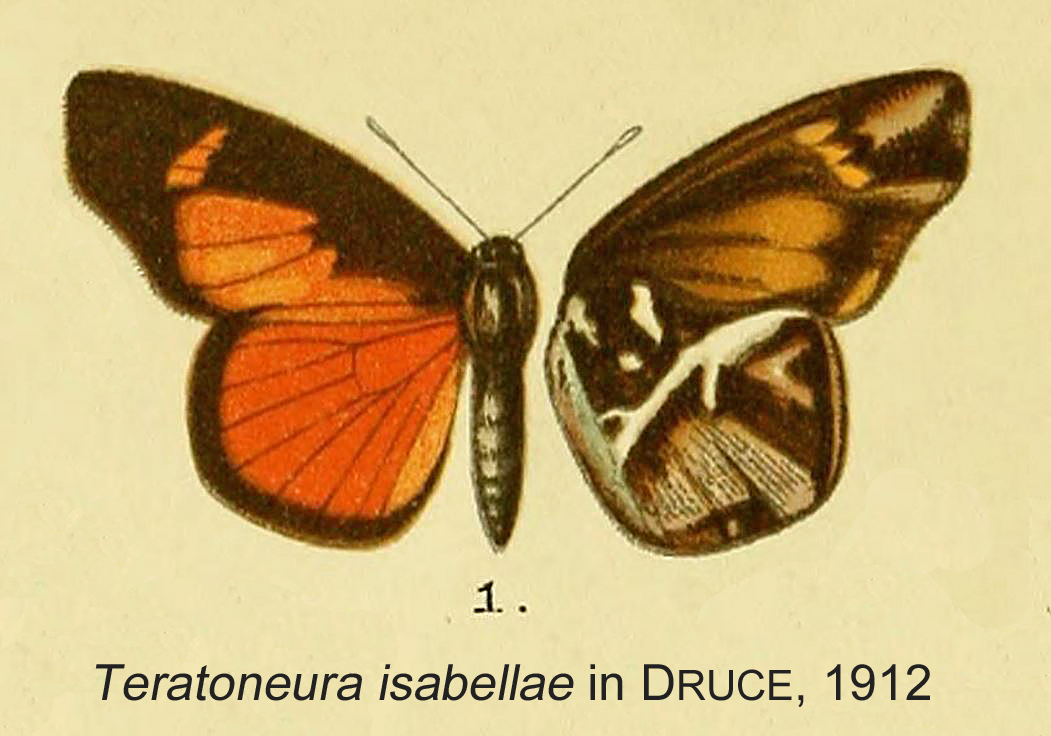

Scientific classification
- Kingdom: Animalia
- Phylum: Arthropoda
- Class: Insecta
- Order: Lepidoptera
- Family: Lycaenidae
- Genus: Teratoneura
- Species: T. isabellae

Binomial name
- Teratoneura isabellae Dudgeon, 1909

= Teratoneura isabellae =

Species of butterfly

Teratoneura isabellae, the western Isabella, is a butterfly in the family Lycaenidae. It is found in Sierra Leone, Ivory Coast, southern Nigeria and Cameroon. The habitat consists of forests.

Adults are on wing from December to March.
