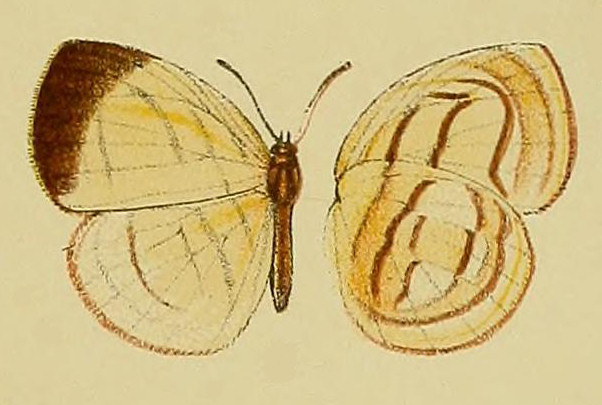

Scientific classification
- Domain: Eukaryota
- Kingdom: Animalia
- Phylum: Arthropoda
- Class: Insecta
- Order: Lepidoptera
- Family: Lycaenidae
- Subfamily: Poritiinae
- Genus: Batelusia; H. H. Druce, 1910
- Species: B. zebra

Binomial name
- Batelusia zebra Druce, 1910

= Batelusia =

Monotypic butterfly genus in family Lycaenidae

Batelusia is a genus of butterflies in the family Lycaenidae. The genus contains only one species Batelusia zebra from Cameroon and the Republic of the Congo and endemic to the Afrotropical realm. Both the genus and species were first described by Hamilton Herbert Druce in 1910.
