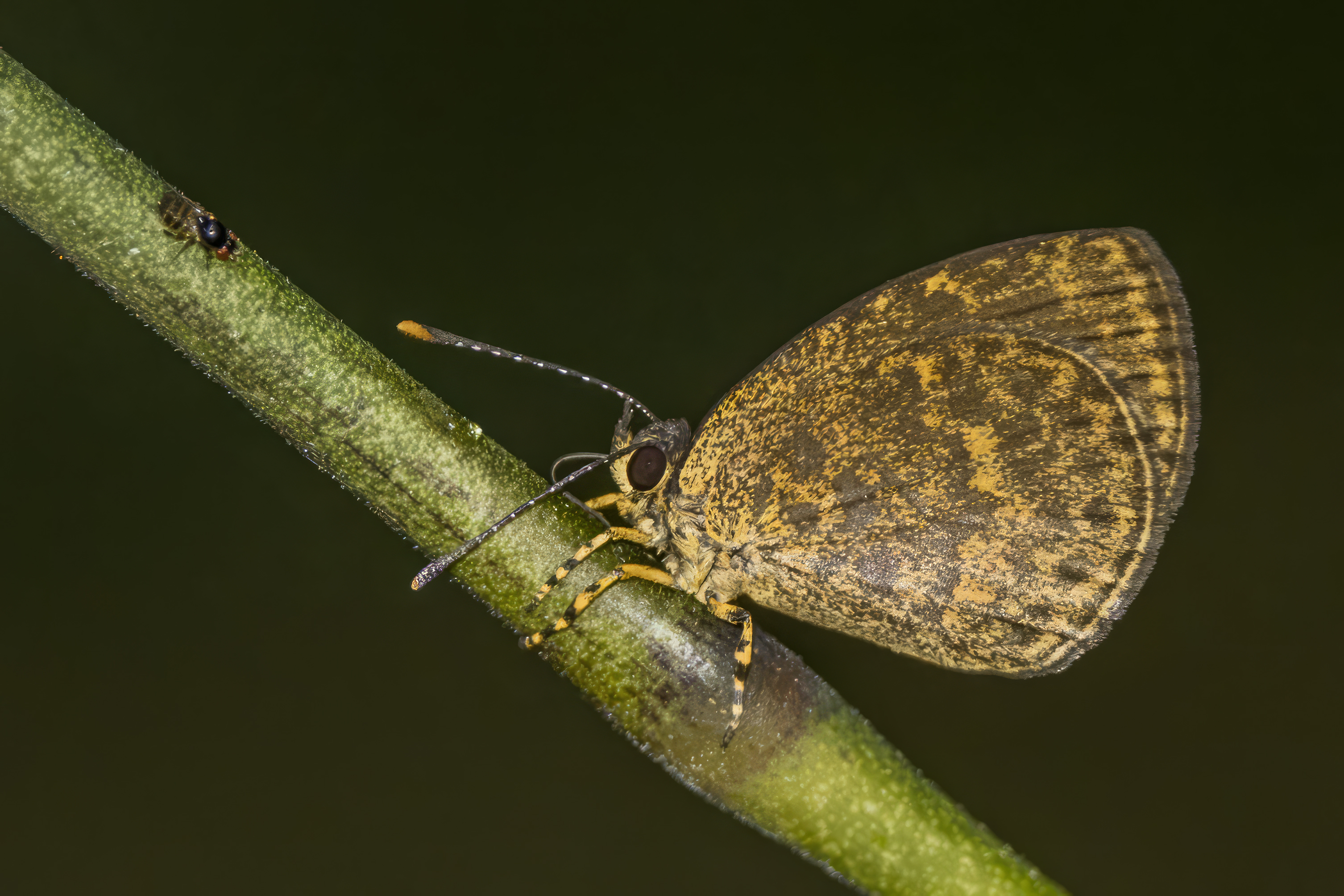
- female Epitolina melissa

Scientific classification
- Domain: Eukaryota
- Kingdom: Animalia
- Phylum: Arthropoda
- Class: Insecta
- Order: Lepidoptera
- Family: Lycaenidae
- Tribe: Liptenini
- Genus: Epitolina; Aurivillius, 1895

= Epitolina =

Butterfly genus in family Lycaenidae

Epitolina is a genus of butterflies in the family Lycaenidae. Confusingly, it is also the name of a subtribe within the subfamily Poritiinae and the tribe Liptenini.

== Species ==
- Epitolina dispar group
  - Epitolina collinsi Libert, 2000
  - Epitolina dispar (Kirby, 1887)
  - Epitolina melissa (Druce, 1888)
- Epitolina catori group
  - Epitolina catori Bethune-Baker, 1904
  - Epitolina larseni Libert, 2000
