= Argyrocheila bitje =

Scientific classification
- Domain: Eukaryota
- Kingdom: Animalia
- Phylum: Arthropoda
- Class: Insecta
- Order: Lepidoptera
- Family: Lycaenidae
- Genus: Argyrocheila
- Species: A. bitje

Binomial name
- Argyrocheila bitje Bethune-Baker, 1915

Species of butterfly

Argyrocheila bitje is a butterfly in the family Lycaenidae. It is found in Cameroon and Zambia. Its habitat consists of primary forests.
