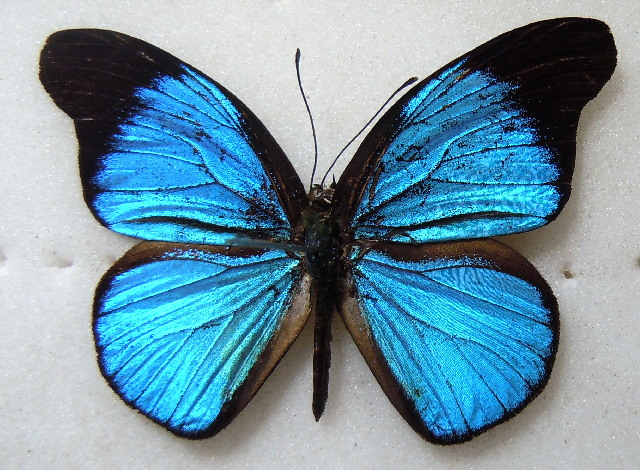

Scientific classification
- Domain: Eukaryota
- Kingdom: Animalia
- Phylum: Arthropoda
- Class: Insecta
- Order: Lepidoptera
- Family: Lycaenidae
- Genus: Epitola
- Species: E. uranoides

Binomial name
- Epitola uranoides Libert, 1999

= Epitola uranoides =

Species of butterfly

Epitola uranoides, the Libert's giant epitola, is a butterfly in the family Lycaenidae. It is found in Guinea, Sierra Leone, Liberia, Ivory Coast, Ghana, Togo, Cameroon, the Republic of the Congo, the Central African Republic, the Democratic Republic of the Congo and Uganda. Its habitat consists of forests.

== Subspecies ==
- Epitola uranoides uranoides (Cameroon, Congo, Central African Republic, Democratic Republic of the Congo, Uganda)
- Epitola uranoides occidentalis Libert, 1999 (Guinea, Sierra Leone, Liberia, Ivory Coast, Ghana, Togo)
