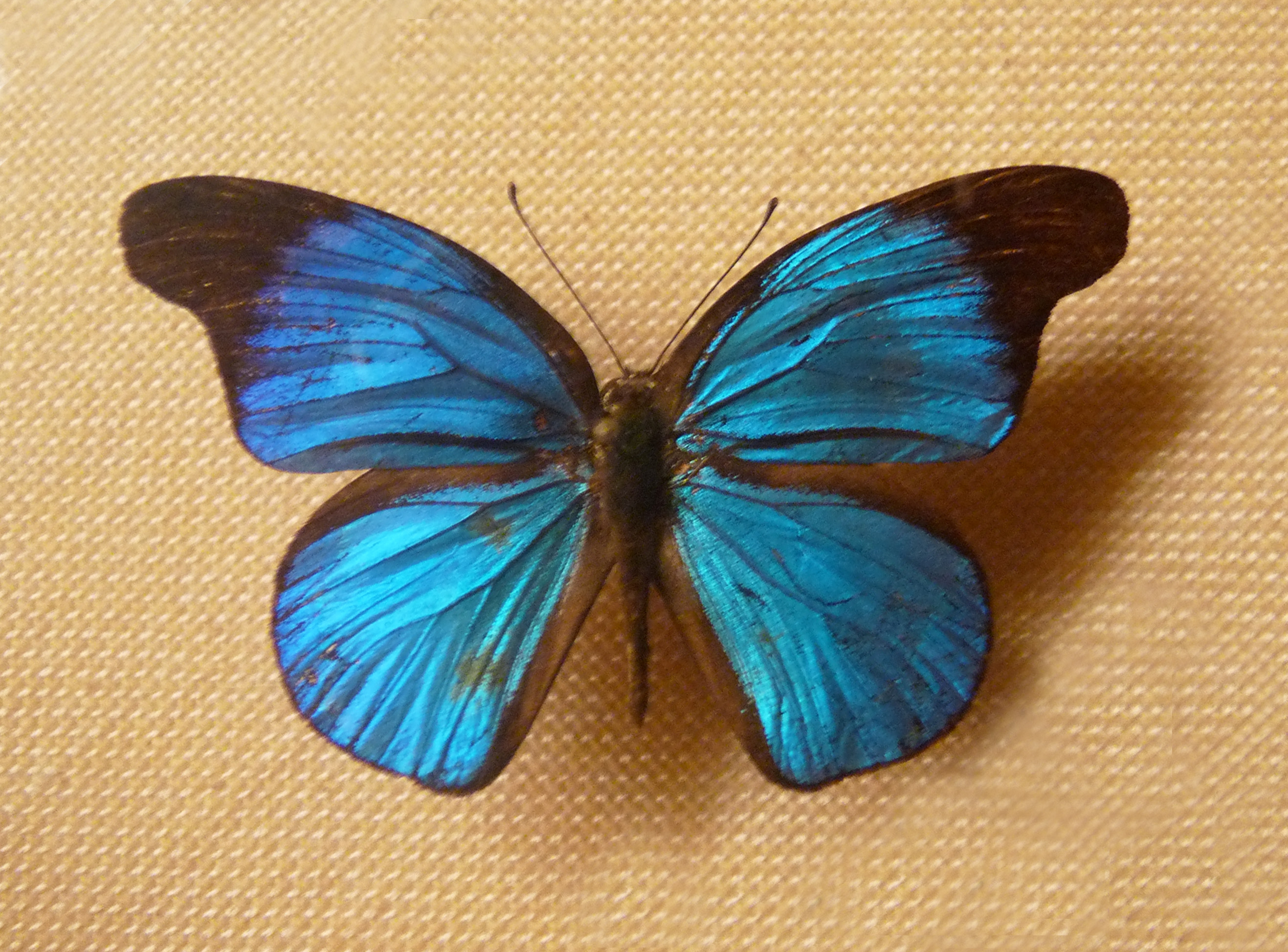
- Epitola posthumus

Scientific classification
- Domain: Eukaryota
- Kingdom: Animalia
- Phylum: Arthropoda
- Class: Insecta
- Order: Lepidoptera
- Family: Lycaenidae
- Subfamily: Poritiinae
- Genus: Epitola; Westwood, 1851

= Epitola =

Butterfly genus in family Lycaenidae

Epitola is a genus of butterflies in the family Lycaenidae. The species of this genus are endemic to the Afrotropical realm. Epitola was erected by John O. Westwood in 1851.

== Species ==
- Epitola posthumus (Fabricius, 1793)
- Epitola urania Kirby, 1887
- Epitola uranoides Libert, 1999
- Epitola concepcion Suffert, 1904

== Species of unknown status ==
- Epitola lamborni Bethune-Baker, 1922 (nomen dubium)
- Epitola pulverulentula Dufrane, 1953 (spelled as Epitola pulverulenta in Ackery, et al., 1995) (nomen dubium)
- Epitola ernesti Karsch, 1895 (nomen dubium)
