= Toxochitona sankuru =

Scientific classification
- Domain: Eukaryota
- Kingdom: Animalia
- Phylum: Arthropoda
- Class: Insecta
- Order: Lepidoptera
- Family: Lycaenidae
- Genus: Toxochitona
- Species: T. sankuru

Binomial name
- Toxochitona sankuru Stempffer, 1961

Species of butterfly

Toxochitona sankuru is a butterfly in the family Lycaenidae. It is found in the Republic of the Congo, the Democratic Republic of the Congo (Sankuru), Uganda and Zambia.
