= Epitolina collinsi =

Scientific classification
- Domain: Eukaryota
- Kingdom: Animalia
- Phylum: Arthropoda
- Class: Insecta
- Order: Lepidoptera
- Family: Lycaenidae
- Genus: Epitolina
- Species: E. collinsi

Binomial name
- Epitolina collinsi Libert, 2000

Species of butterfly

Epitolina collinsi, the Collins' epitolina, is a butterfly in the family Lycaenidae. It is found in Nigeria, Cameroon, the Republic of the Congo, the Central African Republic and possibly Sierra Leone. Its habitat consists of forests.
