= Argyrocheila inundifera =

Scientific classification
- Domain: Eukaryota
- Kingdom: Animalia
- Phylum: Arthropoda
- Class: Insecta
- Order: Lepidoptera
- Family: Lycaenidae
- Genus: Argyrocheila
- Species: A. inundifera

Binomial name
- Argyrocheila inundifera Hawker-Smith, 1933

Species of butterfly

Argyrocheila inundifera is a butterfly in the family Lycaenidae. It is found in the Democratic Republic of the Congo (Lualaba), Uganda, western Kenya and north-western Tanzania. Its habitat consists of primary forests.
