= Euthecta cordeiroi =

Scientific classification
- Kingdom: Animalia
- Phylum: Arthropoda
- Clade: Pancrustacea
- Class: Insecta
- Order: Lepidoptera
- Family: Lycaenidae
- Genus: Euthecta
- Species: E. cordeiroi

Binomial name
- Euthecta cordeiroi Henning & Henning, 2004

Species of butterfly

Euthecta cordeiroi, the Cordeiro's buff, is a butterfly in the family Lycaenidae. It is found in north-eastern Tanzania. The habitat consists of gallery forests at altitudes above 1,000 meters.

Adults have been recorded on wing in March, May and August.
