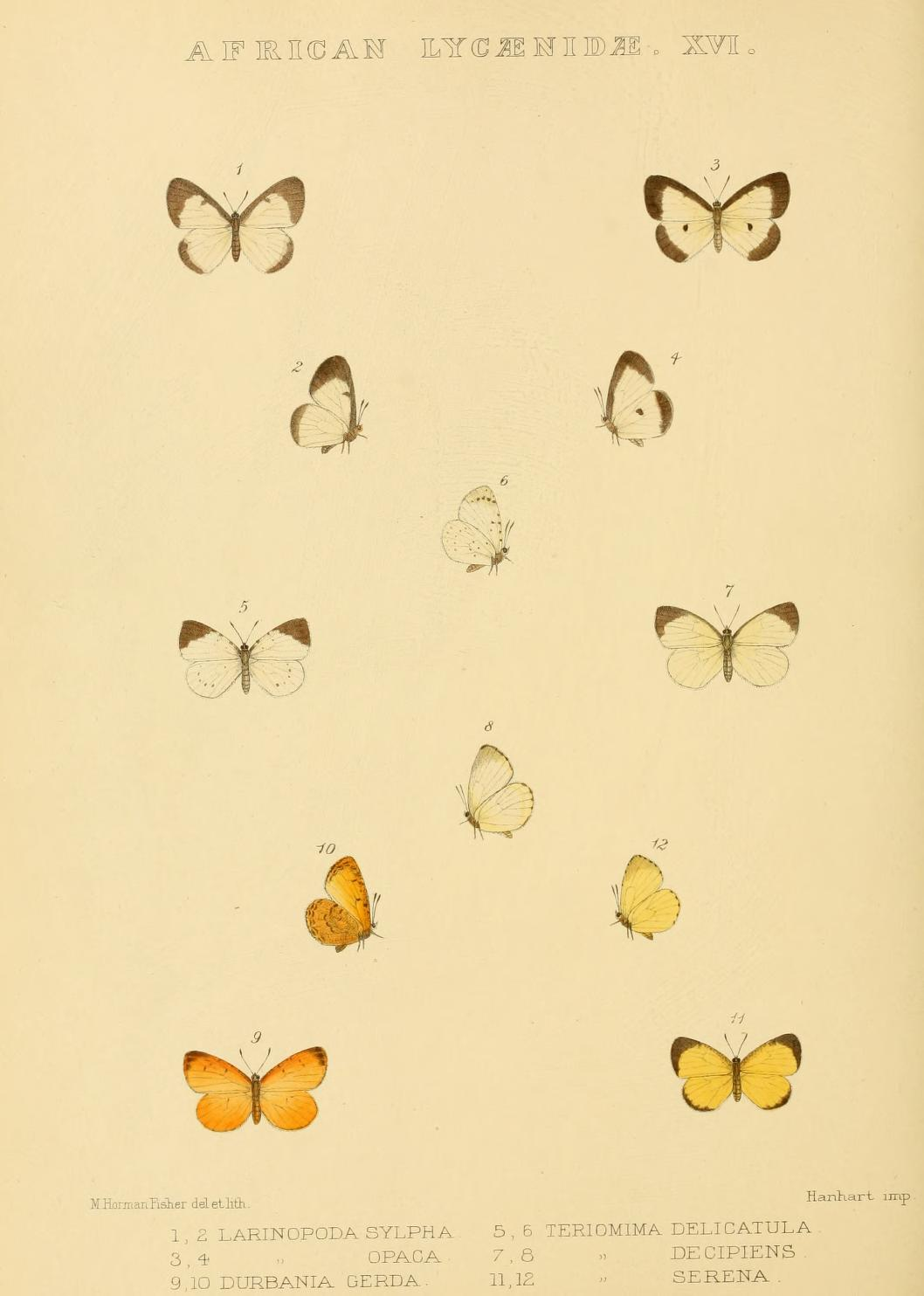

Scientific classification
- Kingdom: Animalia
- Phylum: Arthropoda
- Class: Insecta
- Order: Lepidoptera
- Family: Lycaenidae
- Genus: Toxochitona
- Species: T. gerda

Binomial name
- Toxochitona gerda (Kirby, 1890)

Synonyms
- Durbania gerda Kirby, 1890; Eresina gerda var. unicolor Aurivillius, 1899; Eresina bitjensis Bethune-Baker, 1926

= Toxochitona gerda =

Species of butterfly

Toxochitona gerda, the Gerda's buff, is a butterfly in the family Lycaenidae. It is found in Nigeria (the Cross River loop), Cameroon, the Republic of the Congo, the Democratic Republic of the Congo (Kwilu), Uganda, western Kenya and western Tanzania. The habitat consists of forests.
