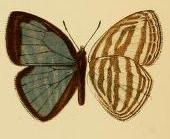

Scientific classification
- Domain: Eukaryota
- Kingdom: Animalia
- Phylum: Arthropoda
- Class: Insecta
- Order: Lepidoptera
- Family: Lycaenidae
- Subfamily: Poritiinae
- Genus: Powellana; Bethune-Baker, 1908
- Species: P. cottoni

Binomial name
- Powellana cottoni Bethune-Baker, 1908

Synonyms
- Genus: Satyrimima Holland, 1913; Species: Satyrimima weberi Holland, 1913; Powellana virginea Birket-Smith, 1960

= Powellana =

Monotypic butterfly genus in family Lycaenidae

Powellana is a genus of butterflies in the family Lycaenidae, endemic to the Afrotropical realm. Powellana is monotypic, containing the single species Powellana cottoni found in Cameroon, the Republic of the Congo, the Democratic Republic of the Congo (Equateur and Sankuru) and Uganda (from the western part of the country to the Bwamba Valley).
