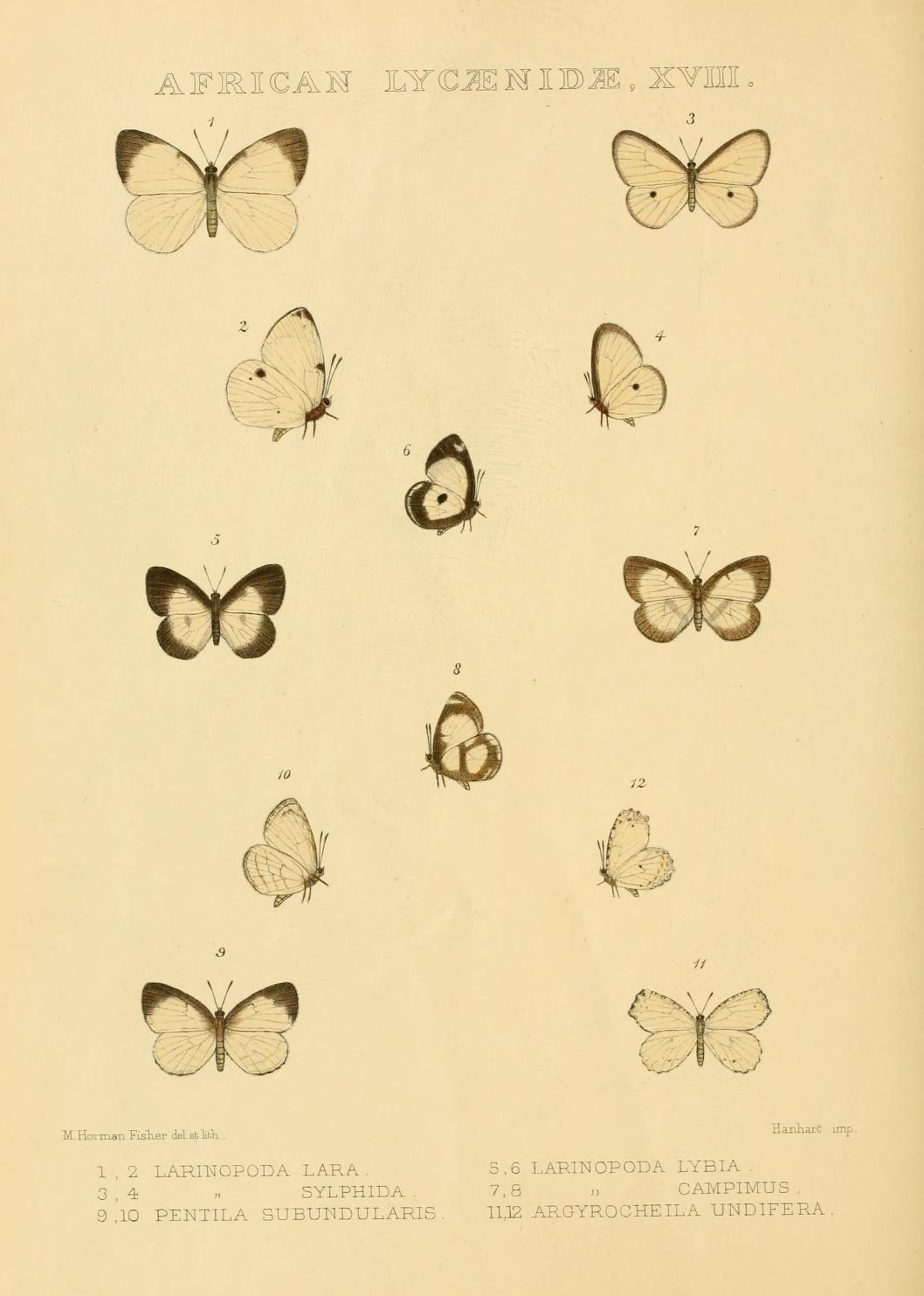
- Figures 11 and 12

Scientific classification
- Domain: Eukaryota
- Kingdom: Animalia
- Phylum: Arthropoda
- Class: Insecta
- Order: Lepidoptera
- Family: Lycaenidae
- Genus: Argyrocheila
- Species: A. undifera

Binomial name
- Argyrocheila undifera Staudinger, 1892

= Argyrocheila undifera =

Species of butterfly

Argyrocheila undifera, the fairy white, is a butterfly in the family Lycaenidae. It is found in Sierra Leone, Ivory Coast, Ghana, Nigeria, Cameroon, Gabon, the Republic of the Congo, the Central African Republic, the Democratic Republic of the Congo, Uganda and Tanzania. Its habitat consists of primary forests.

== Subspecies ==
- Argyrocheila undifera undifera (Sierra Leone, Ivory Coast, Ghana, southern and eastern Nigeria, Cameroon, Gabon, Congo, Central African Republic, Democratic Republic of the Congo: Lualaba)
- Argyrocheila undifera ugandae Hawker-Smith, 1933 (north-eastern Democratic Republic of the Congo, Uganda, north-western Tanzania)
