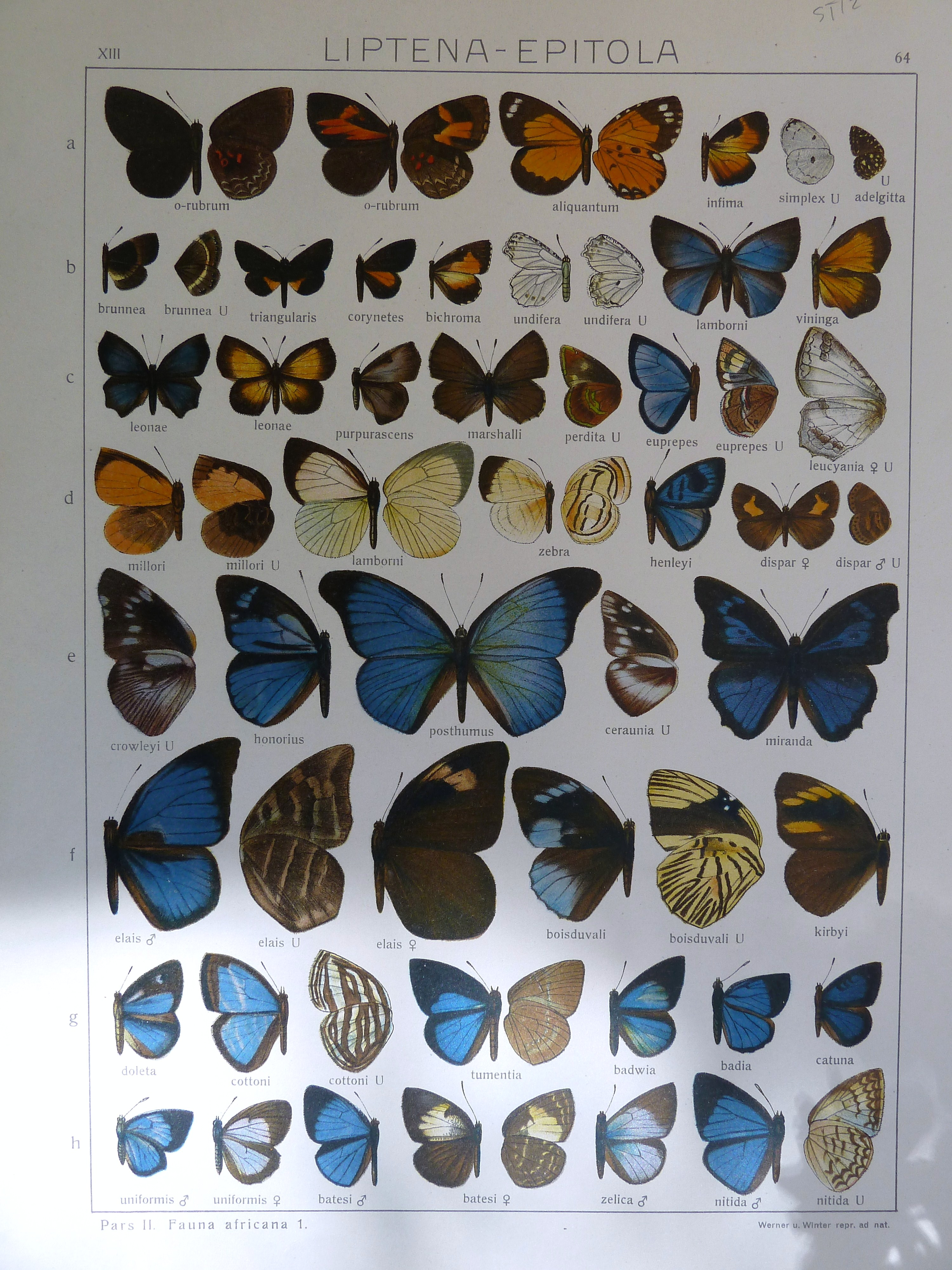
- E. bichroma in Seitz b

Scientific classification
- Domain: Eukaryota
- Kingdom: Animalia
- Phylum: Arthropoda
- Class: Insecta
- Order: Lepidoptera
- Family: Lycaenidae
- Subfamily: Poritiinae
- Genus: Eresinopsides; Strand, 1911

= Eresinopsides =

Butterfly genus in family Lycaenidae

Eresinopsides is a genus of butterflies in the family Lycaenidae. This genus is endemic to the Afrotropical realm.

== Species ==
- Eresinopsides bamptoni Henning & Henning, 2004
- Eresinopsides bichroma Strand, 1911
