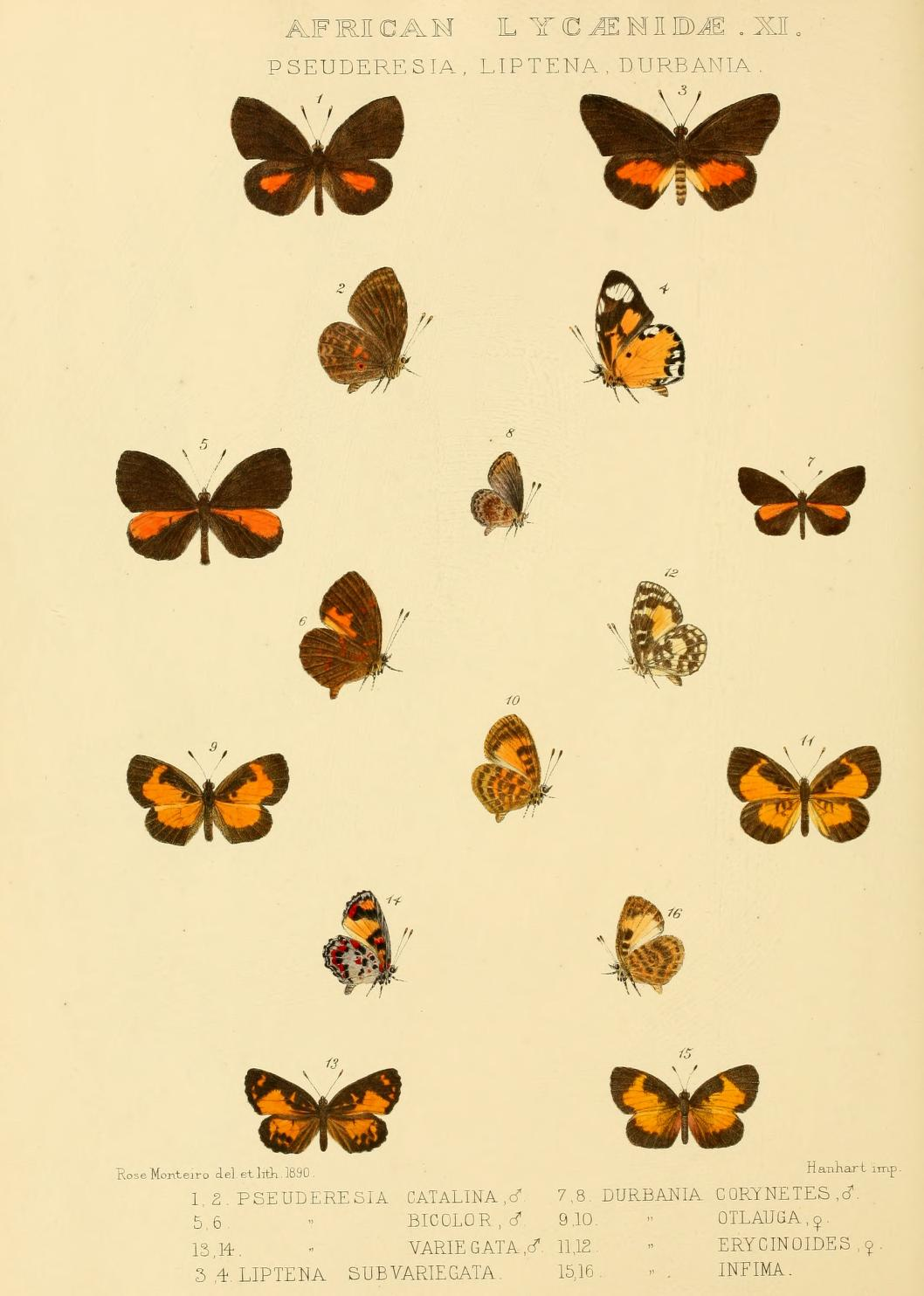
- Obania subvariegata as Liptena subvariegata figures 3 and 4

Scientific classification
- Domain: Eukaryota
- Kingdom: Animalia
- Phylum: Arthropoda
- Class: Insecta
- Order: Lepidoptera
- Family: Lycaenidae
- Subfamily: Poritiinae
- Genus: Obania; Collins & Larsen, 1998

= Obania =

Genus of butterflies

Obania is a genus of butterflies in the family Lycaenidae. Obania is endemic to the Afrotropical realm.

== Species ==
- Obania subvariegata (Grose-Smith & Kirby, 1890)
- Obania tullia (Staudinger, 1892)
- Obania tulliana (Grose-Smith, 1901)
