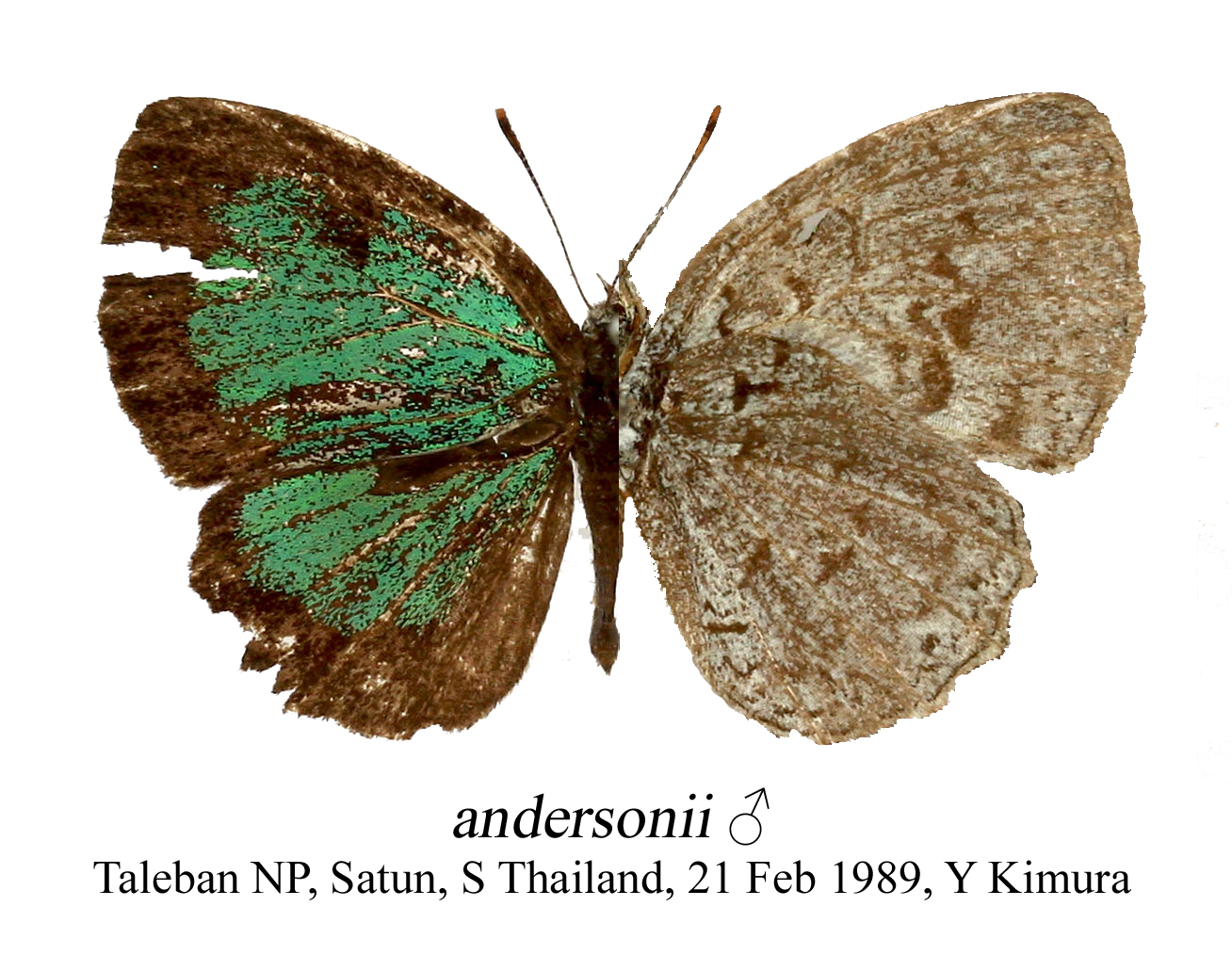
- Cyaniriodes libna

Scientific classification
- Domain: Eukaryota
- Kingdom: Animalia
- Phylum: Arthropoda
- Class: Insecta
- Order: Lepidoptera
- Family: Lycaenidae
- Subfamily: Poritiinae
- Genus: Cyaniriodes de Nicéville, 1890

= Cyaniriodes =

Butterfly genus in family Lycaenidae

Cyaniriodes is a genus of butterflies in the family Lycaenidae. The genus was erected by Lionel de Nicéville in 1890.

== Species ==
- Cyaniriodes libna (Hewitson, 1869) southern Burma (Mergui), Thailand, Peninsular Malaysia, Langkawi Island
- Cyaniriodes siraspiorum Schröder & Treadaway, 1979 Philippines
