= Eresinopsides bamptoni =

Scientific classification
- Kingdom: Animalia
- Phylum: Arthropoda
- Class: Insecta
- Order: Lepidoptera
- Family: Lycaenidae
- Genus: Eresinopsides
- Species: E. bamptoni

Binomial name
- Eresinopsides bamptoni Henning & Henning, 2004

Species of butterfly

Eresinopsides bamptoni is a butterfly in the family Lycaenidae. It is found in south-eastern Tanzania. The habitat consists of lowland forests.

Adults have been recorded on wing in February and March.
