= Epitolina catori =

Scientific classification
- Kingdom: Animalia
- Phylum: Arthropoda
- Clade: Pancrustacea
- Class: Insecta
- Order: Lepidoptera
- Family: Lycaenidae
- Genus: Epitolina
- Species: E. catori

Binomial name
- Epitolina catori Bethune-Baker, 1904

Species of butterfly

Epitolina catori, the red-patch epitolina, is a butterfly in the family Lycaenidae. It is found in Sierra Leone, Ivory Coast, Ghana, Togo, Nigeria, Cameroon, the Central African Republic, the Democratic Republic of the Congo, Uganda and Tanzania. Its habitat consists of forests.

== Subspecies ==
- Epitolina catori catori (Sierra Leone, Ivory Coast, Ghana, Togo, Nigeria: south and the Cross River loop, western Cameroon)
- Epitolina catori ugandae Jackson, 1962 (Central African Republic, Democratic Republic of the Congo, Uganda, north-western Tanzania)

Torben Larsen developed a species numbering system for his 2005 publication Butterflies of West Africa. The nominate subspecies is #350. The 'Larsen' numbers have since been used with permission in A Sharp Eye on Butterflies of Ghana.
