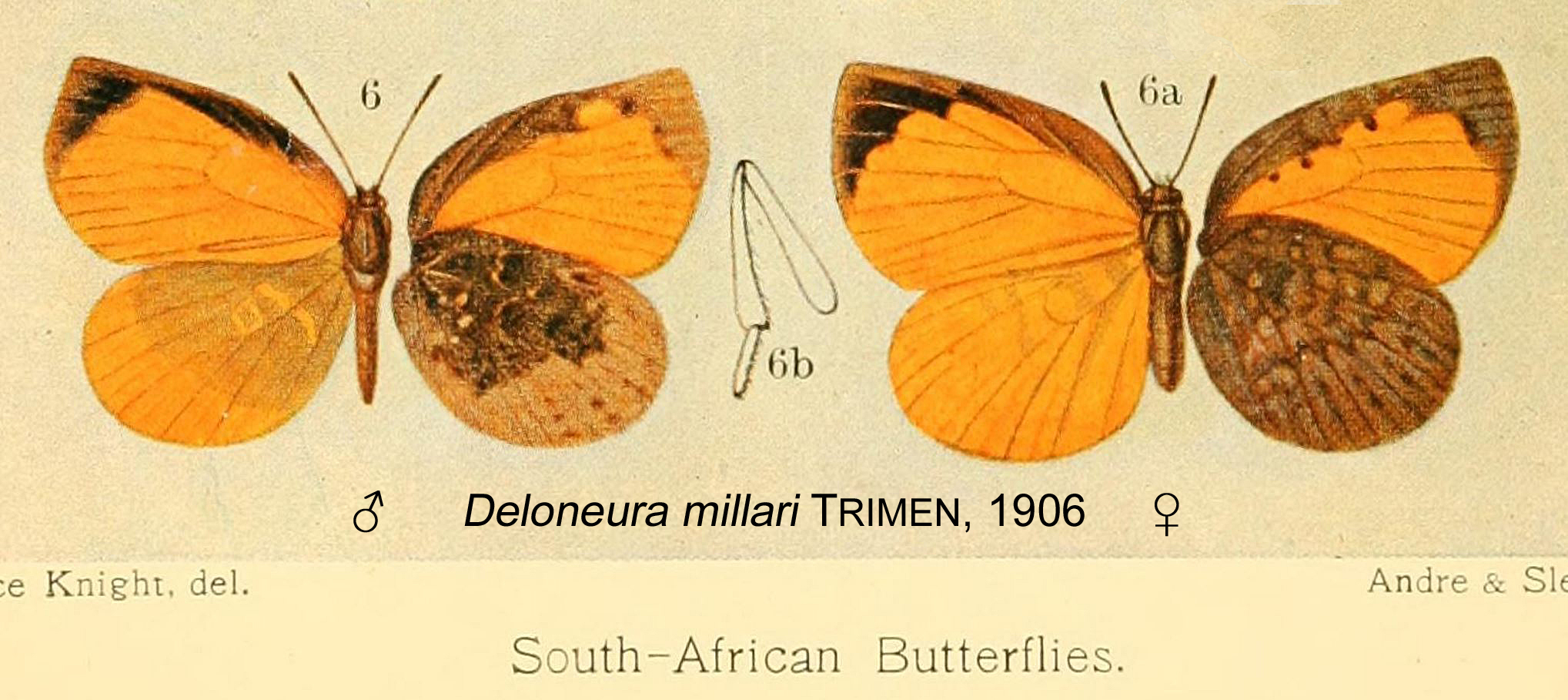

Conservation status
- Least Concern (IUCN 3.1)

Scientific classification
- Kingdom: Animalia
- Phylum: Arthropoda
- Class: Insecta
- Order: Lepidoptera
- Family: Lycaenidae
- Genus: Deloneura
- Species: D. millari

Binomial name
- Deloneura millari Trimen, 1906

= Deloneura millari =

Millar's buff

Species of butterfly

Deloneura millari, the Millar's buff, is a butterfly of the family Lycaenidae. It is found in South Africa, Eswatini and Mozambique. The habitat consists of coastal bush and moist savannah.

The wingspan is 23–27 mm for males and 24–29 mm for females. Adults are on wing from September to October and from March to May. There are two generations per year.

The larvae possibly feed on cyanobacteria species.

== Subspecies ==
- Deloneura millari millari (Eswatini and savannah and open coastal forest from the Eastern Cape along the coast to northern KwaZulu-Natal)
- Deloneura millari dondoensis Pennington, 1953 (Dondo Forest in Mozambigue)
