= Kakumia ferruginea =

Scientific classification
- Domain: Eukaryota
- Kingdom: Animalia
- Phylum: Arthropoda
- Class: Insecta
- Order: Lepidoptera
- Family: Lycaenidae
- Genus: Kakumia
- Species: K. ferruginea

Binomial name
- Kakumia ferruginea (Schultze, 1923)

Synonyms
- Liptena ferruginea Schultze, 1923

Species of butterfly

Kakumia ferruginea is a butterfly in the family Lycaenidae. It is found in southern Cameroon and the Republic of the Congo.
