= Deloneura abri =

Scientific classification
- Kingdom: Animalia
- Phylum: Arthropoda
- Class: Insecta
- Order: Lepidoptera
- Family: Lycaenidae
- Genus: Deloneura
- Species: D. abri

Binomial name
- Deloneura abri Congdon & Collins, 1998

Species of butterfly

Deloneura abri is a butterfly in the family Lycaenidae. It is found in Zanzibar, Tanzania. Its habitat consists of forests.

Adults have been recorded on wing in January.
