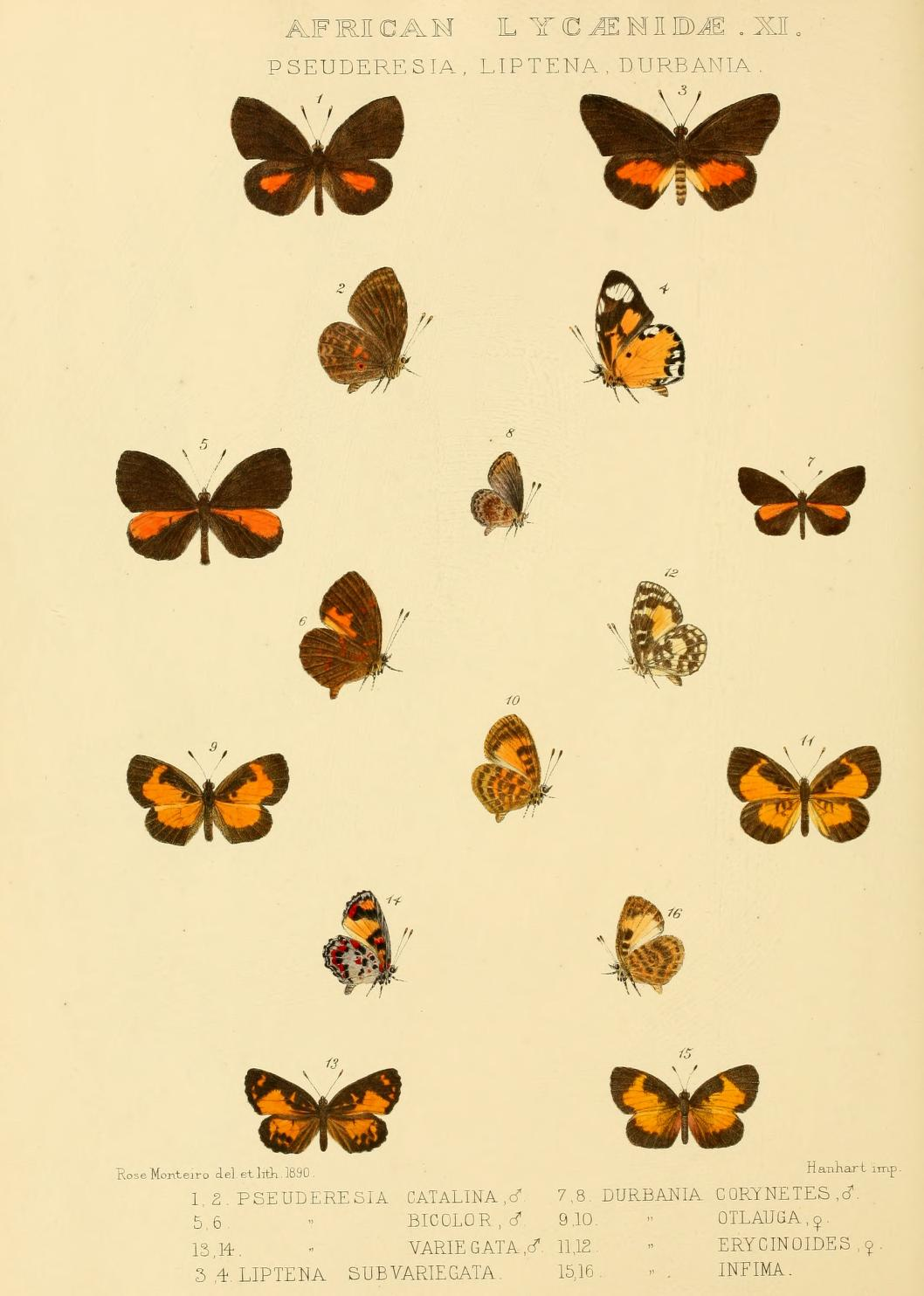

Scientific classification
- Domain: Eukaryota
- Kingdom: Animalia
- Phylum: Arthropoda
- Class: Insecta
- Order: Lepidoptera
- Family: Lycaenidae
- Genus: Kakumia
- Species: K. otlauga

Binomial name
- Kakumia otlauga (Grose-Smith & Kirby, 1890)

Synonyms
- Durbania otlauga Grose-Smith & Kirby, 1890; Pseuderesia gordoni Druce, 1903; Liptena gordoni; Durbania infima Grose-Smith and Kirby, 1890; Pseuderesia bakeriana Cator, 1904

= Kakumia otlauga =

Species of butterfly

Kakumia otlauga, the western kakumia, is a butterfly in the family Lycaenidae. It is found in Guinea, Sierra Leone, Liberia, Ivory Coast, Ghana, Nigeria (south and the Cross River loop), Cameroon, Gabon and possibly western Uganda. The habitat consists of forests.
