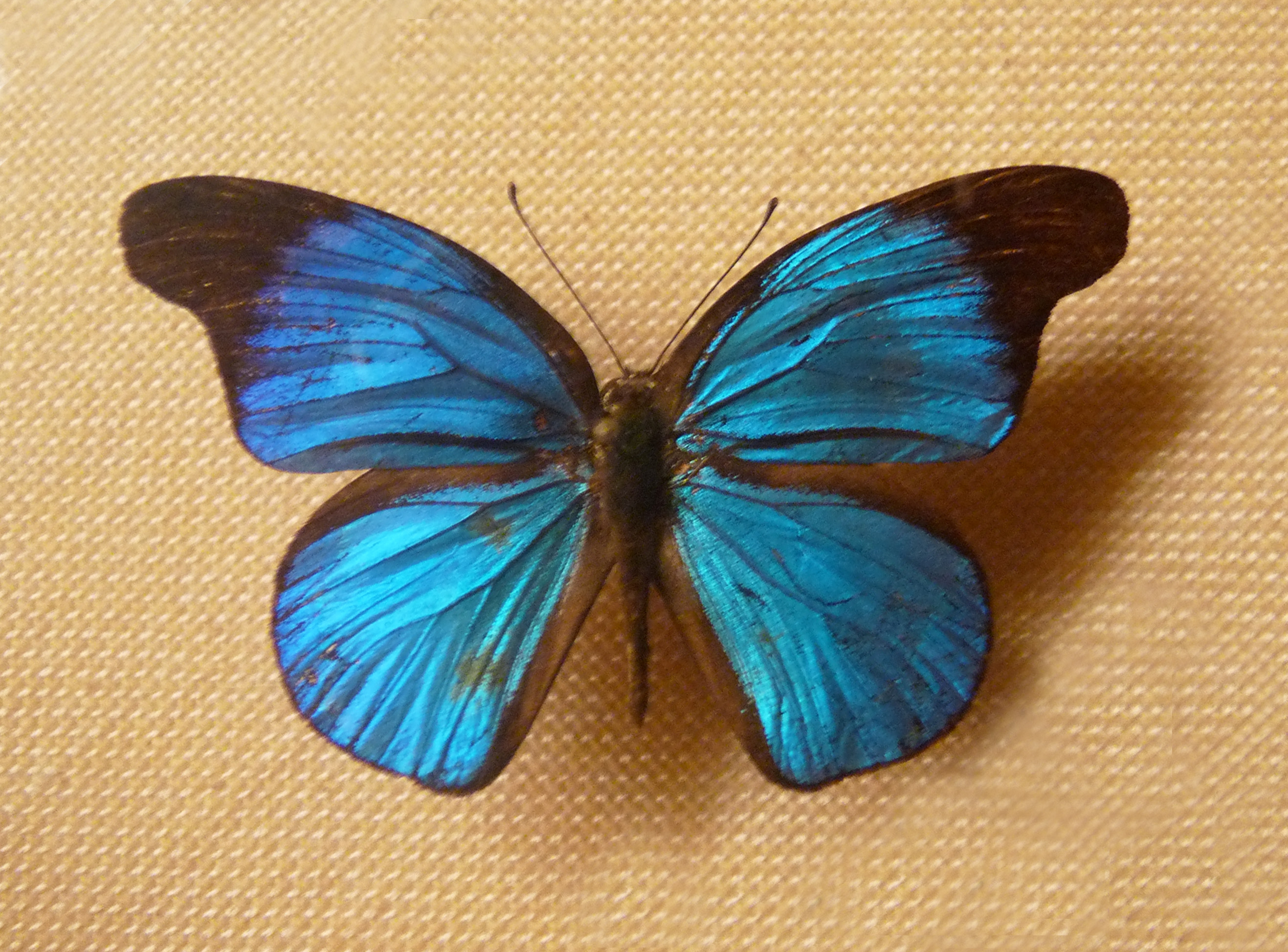

Scientific classification
- Kingdom: Animalia
- Phylum: Arthropoda
- Clade: Pancrustacea
- Class: Insecta
- Order: Lepidoptera
- Family: Lycaenidae
- Genus: Epitola
- Species: E. posthumus

Binomial name
- Epitola posthumus (Fabricius, 1793)

Synonyms
- Papilio posthumus Fabricius, 1793; Epitola elion Westwood, 1851; Epitola belli Hewitson, 1874

= Epitola posthumus =

Species of butterfly

Epitola posthumus, the common giant epitola, is a butterfly in the family Lycaenidae. It is found in Guinea, Sierra Leone, Ivory Coast, Ghana, Togo, Nigeria (south and the Cross River loop), Cameroon, Gabon and the Republic of Congo. Its habitat consists of forests.

Torben Larsen developed a species numbering system for his 2005 publication Butterflies of West Africa. This species is #294. The 'Larsen' numbers have since been used with permission in A Sharp Eye on Butterflies of Ghana.
