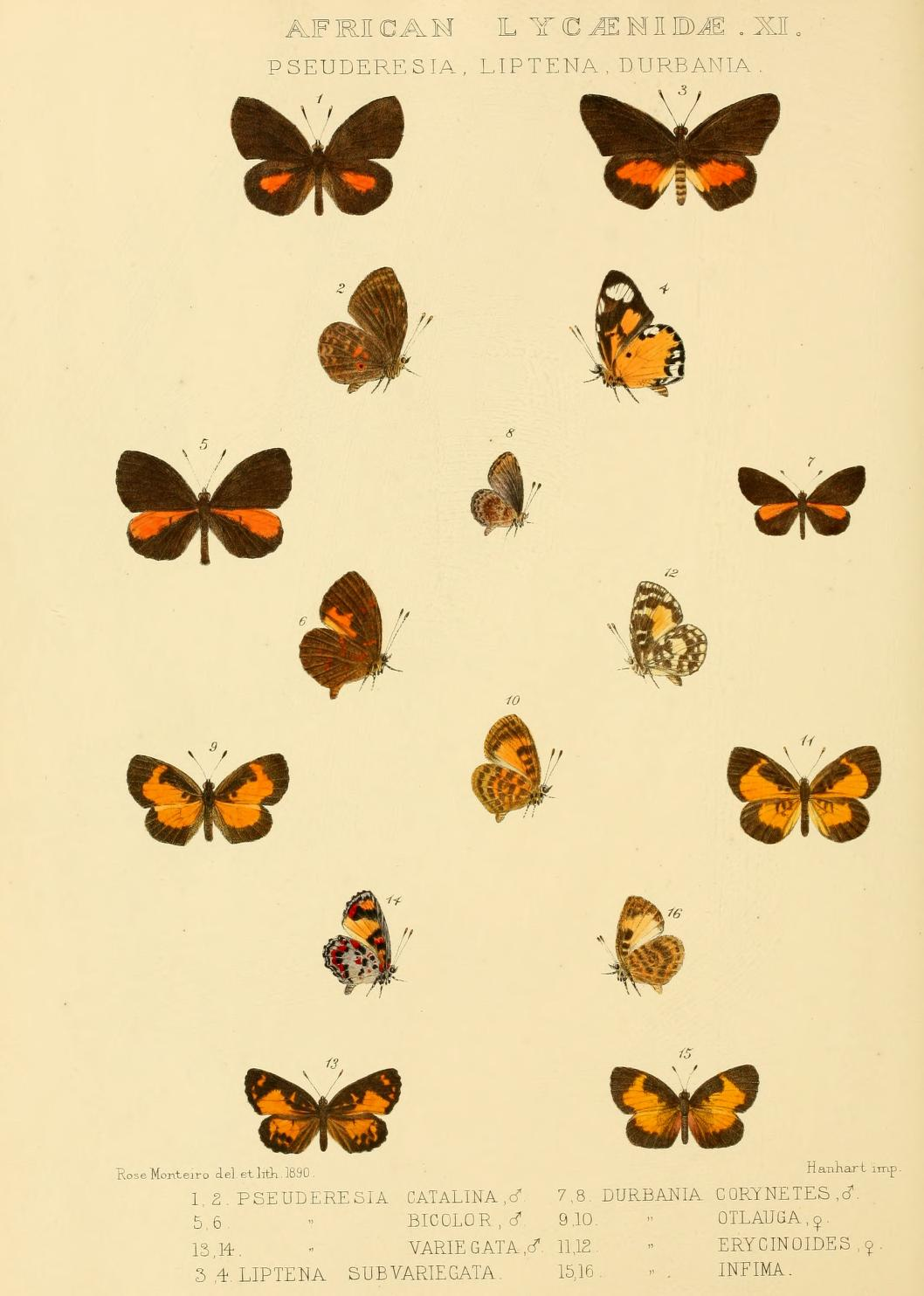
- Kakumia otlauga figures 9, 10, 15 and 16

Scientific classification
- Domain: Eukaryota
- Kingdom: Animalia
- Phylum: Arthropoda
- Class: Insecta
- Order: Lepidoptera
- Family: Lycaenidae
- Subfamily: Poritiinae
- Genus: Kakumia; Collins & Larsen, 1998

= Kakumia =

Genus of butterflies

Kakumia is a genus of butterflies in the family Lycaenidae. The genus is endemic to the Afrotropical realm.

== Species ==
- Kakumia ferruginea (Schultze, 1923)
- Kakumia ideoides (Dewitz, 1887)
- Kakumia otlauga (Grose-Smith & Kirby, 1890)
