= Teratoneura congoensis =

Scientific classification
- Kingdom: Animalia
- Phylum: Arthropoda
- Class: Insecta
- Order: Lepidoptera
- Family: Lycaenidae
- Genus: Teratoneura
- Species: T. congoensis

Binomial name
- Teratoneura congoensis Stempffer, 1954

Synonyms
- Teratoneura isabellae congoensis Stempffer, 1954

Species of butterfly

Teratoneura congoensis, the eastern Isabella, is a butterfly in the family Lycaenidae. It is found in the Republic of the Congo, the Democratic Republic of the Congo (Equateur, Tshuapa, Tshopo, Sankuru and Lualaba), Uganda, north-western Tanzania, Zambia and possibly Cameroon. The habitat consists of forests and woodland.

Adults are on wing in November and December.

The larvae are associated with an ant species of the genus Crematogaster. This ant was found living in burrows in dead wood.
