= Neoepitola =

Scientific classification
- Kingdom: Animalia
- Phylum: Arthropoda
- Class: Insecta
- Order: Lepidoptera
- Family: Lycaenidae
- Subfamily: Poritiinae
- Genus: Neoepitola; Jackson, 1964
- Species: N. barombiensis

Binomial name
- Neoepitola barombiensis (Kirby, 1890)

Synonyms
- Epitola barombiensis Kirby, 1890

Monotypic butterfly genus in family Lycaenidae

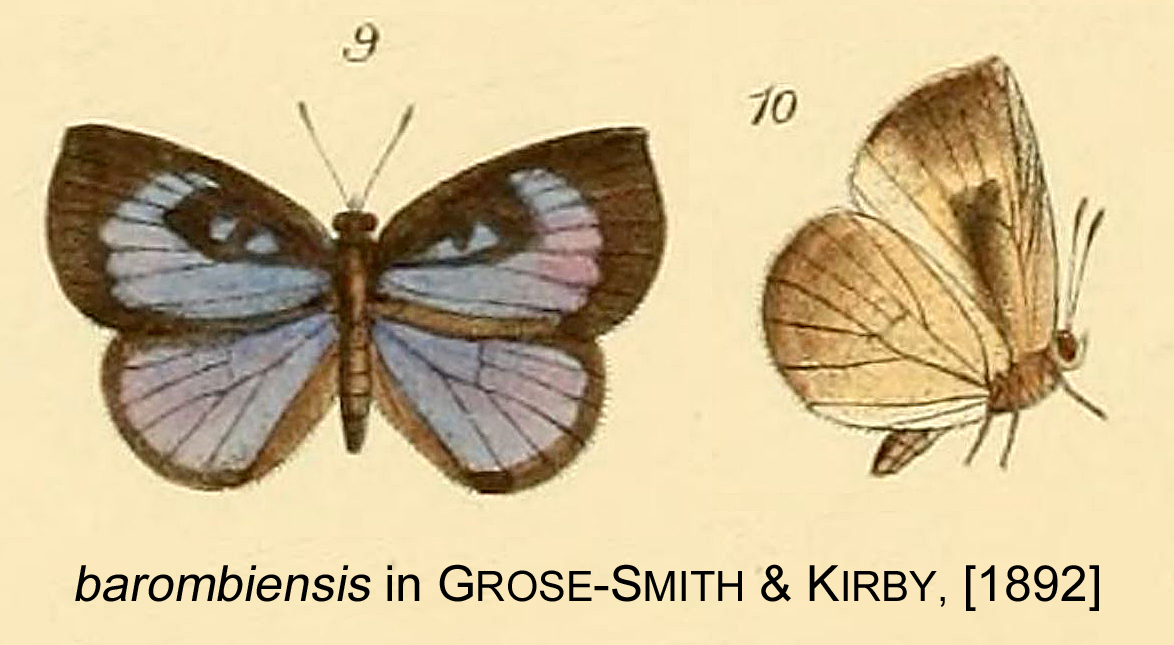
Neoepitola barombiensis from Rhopalocrea Exotica.

Neoepitola is a genus of butterflies in the family Lycaenidae, endemic to the Afrotropical realm. It consists of only one species, Neoepitola barombiensis, which is found in Cameroon, the Republic of the Congo, the Democratic Republic of the Congo (Sankuru) and western Uganda.
