= Toxochitona vansomereni =

Scientific classification
- Domain: Eukaryota
- Kingdom: Animalia
- Phylum: Arthropoda
- Class: Insecta
- Order: Lepidoptera
- Family: Lycaenidae
- Genus: Toxochitona
- Species: T. vansomereni

Binomial name
- Toxochitona vansomereni (Stempffer, 1954)

Synonyms
- Eresina vansomereni Stempffer, 1954

Species of butterfly

Toxochitona vansomereni is a butterfly in the family Lycaenidae. It is found in Uganda (from the south-western part of the country to the Kigezi District).
