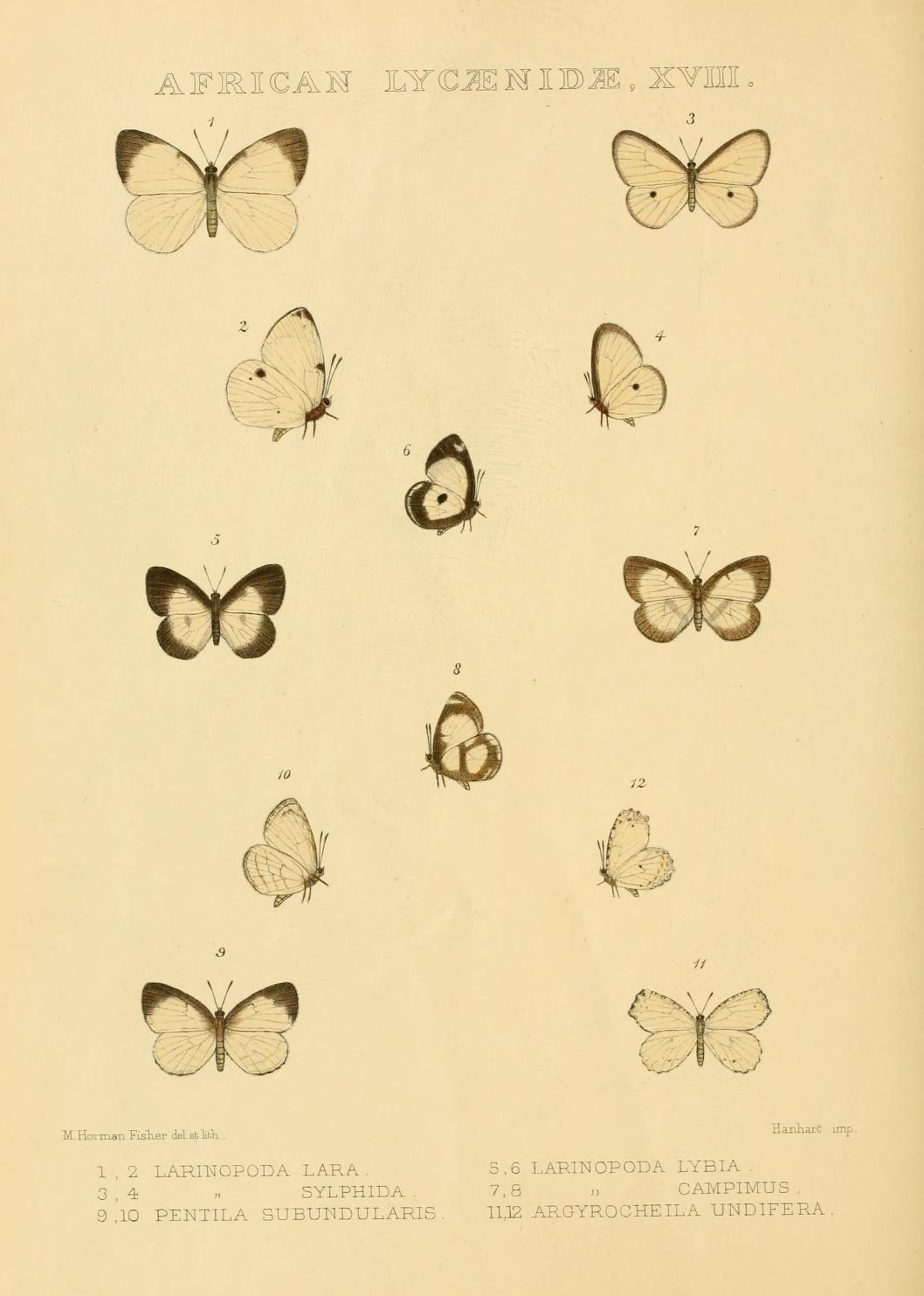
- Argyrocheila undifera figures 11 and 12

Scientific classification
- Kingdom: Animalia
- Phylum: Arthropoda
- Class: Insecta
- Order: Lepidoptera
- Family: Lycaenidae
- Subfamily: Poritiinae
- Genus: Argyrocheila; Staudinger, [1892]

= Argyrocheila =

Butterfly genus in family Lycaenidae

Argyrocheila is a genus of butterflies in the family Lycaenidae. The species of this genus are endemic to the Afrotropical realm.

== Species ==
- Argyrocheila bitje Bethune-Baker, 1915
- Argyrocheila inundifera Hawker-Smith, 1933
- Argyrocheila undifera Staudinger, [1892]
