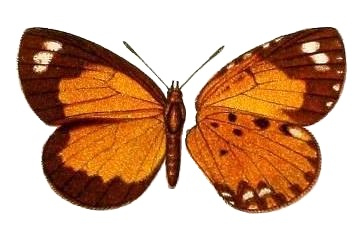
- female

Scientific classification
- Kingdom: Animalia
- Phylum: Arthropoda
- Class: Insecta
- Order: Lepidoptera
- Family: Lycaenidae
- Genus: Obania
- Species: O. subvariegata

Binomial name
- Obania subvariegata (Grose-Smith & Kirby, 1890)

Synonyms
- Liptena subvariegata Grose-Smith & Kirby, 1890; Liptena subvariegata aliquantum Druce, 1910

= Obania subvariegata =

Mimic obania

Species of butterfly

Obania subvariegata, the mimic obania, is a butterfly in the family Lycaenidae. It is found in Nigeria, Cameroon, the Central African Republic and the Democratic Republic of the Congo. The habitat consists of forests.

The species is associated with tree ants.

== Subspecies ==
- Obania subvariegata subvariegata (Nigeria: Cross River loop, Cameroon, Central African Republic)
- Obania subvariegata aliquantum (Druce, 1910) (Democratic Republic of the Congo: Tshopo and Kasai)
