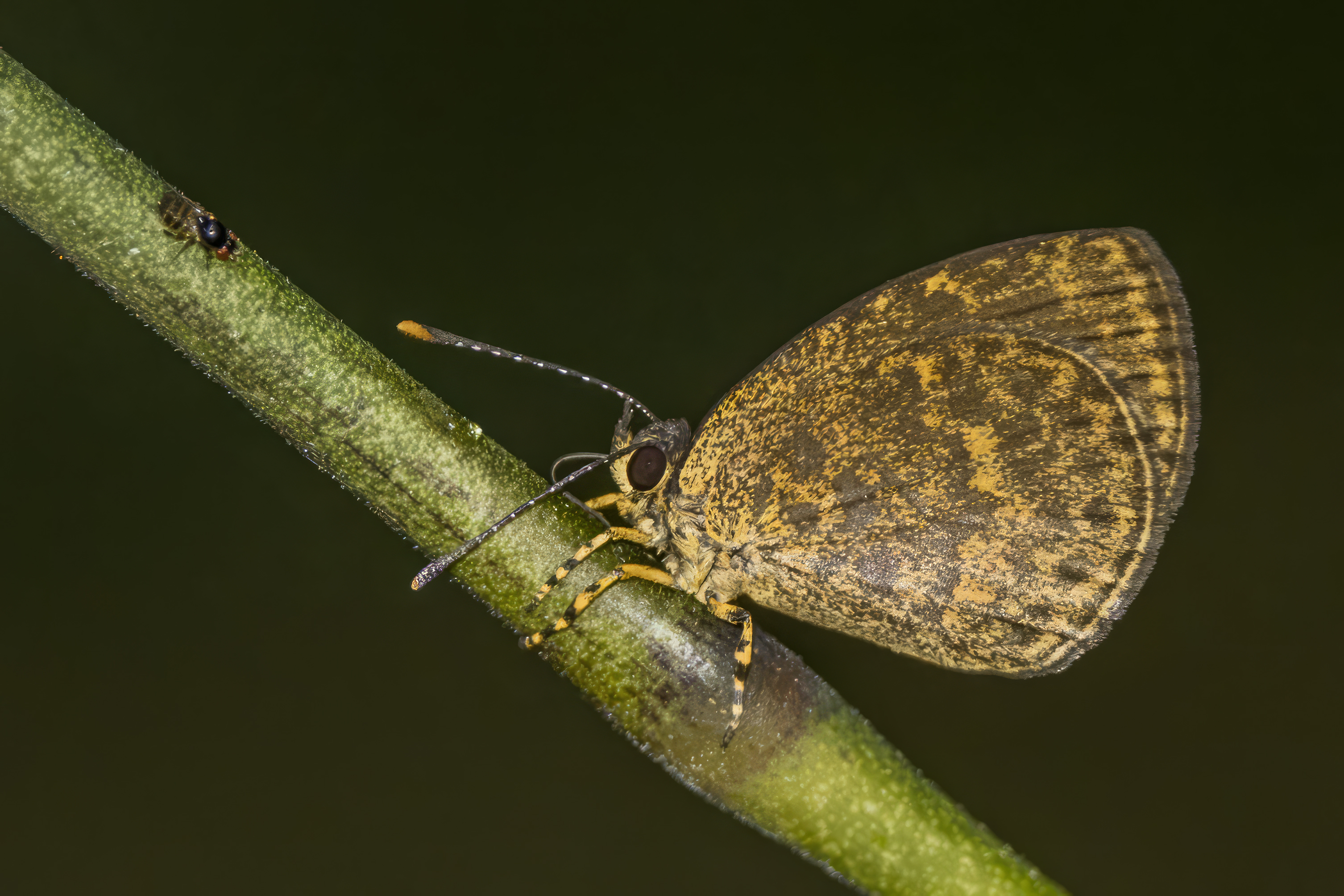
- Female, Ghana
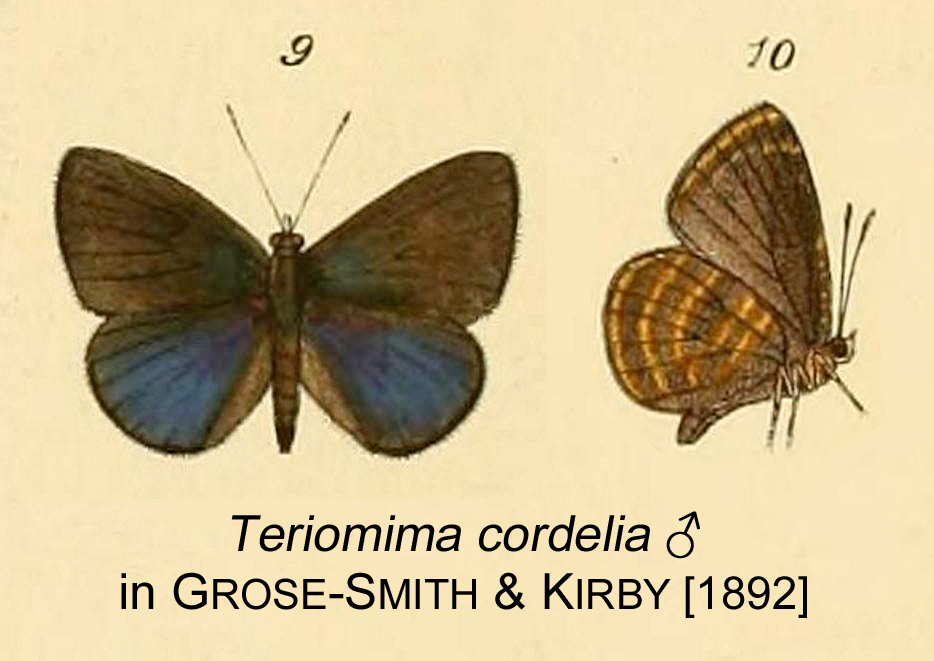

Scientific classification
- Kingdom: Animalia
- Phylum: Arthropoda
- Clade: Pancrustacea
- Class: Insecta
- Order: Lepidoptera
- Family: Lycaenidae
- Genus: Epitolina
- Species: E. melissa

Binomial name
- Epitolina melissa (H. H. Druce, 1888)

Synonyms
- Teriomima melissa H. H. Druce, 1888; Teriomima cordelia Kirby, 1890

= Epitolina melissa =

Species of butterfly

Epitolina melissa, the powdered epitolina, is a butterfly in the family Lycaenidae. The species was first described by Hamilton Herbert Druce in 1888. It is found in Guinea, Sierra Leone, Liberia, Ivory Coast, Ghana, Togo, Nigeria (south and the Cross River loop), Cameroon, Equatorial Guinea, Gabon, the Republic of the Congo, the Central African Republic, Angola, the Democratic Republic of the Congo (Shaba to Kafakumba and Kapanga), Uganda and north-western Tanzania. Its habitat consists of forests.

Torben Larsen developed a species numbering system for his 2005 publication Butterflies of West Africa. This species is #348. The 'Larsen' numbers have since been used with permission in A Sharp Eye on Butterflies of Ghana.
