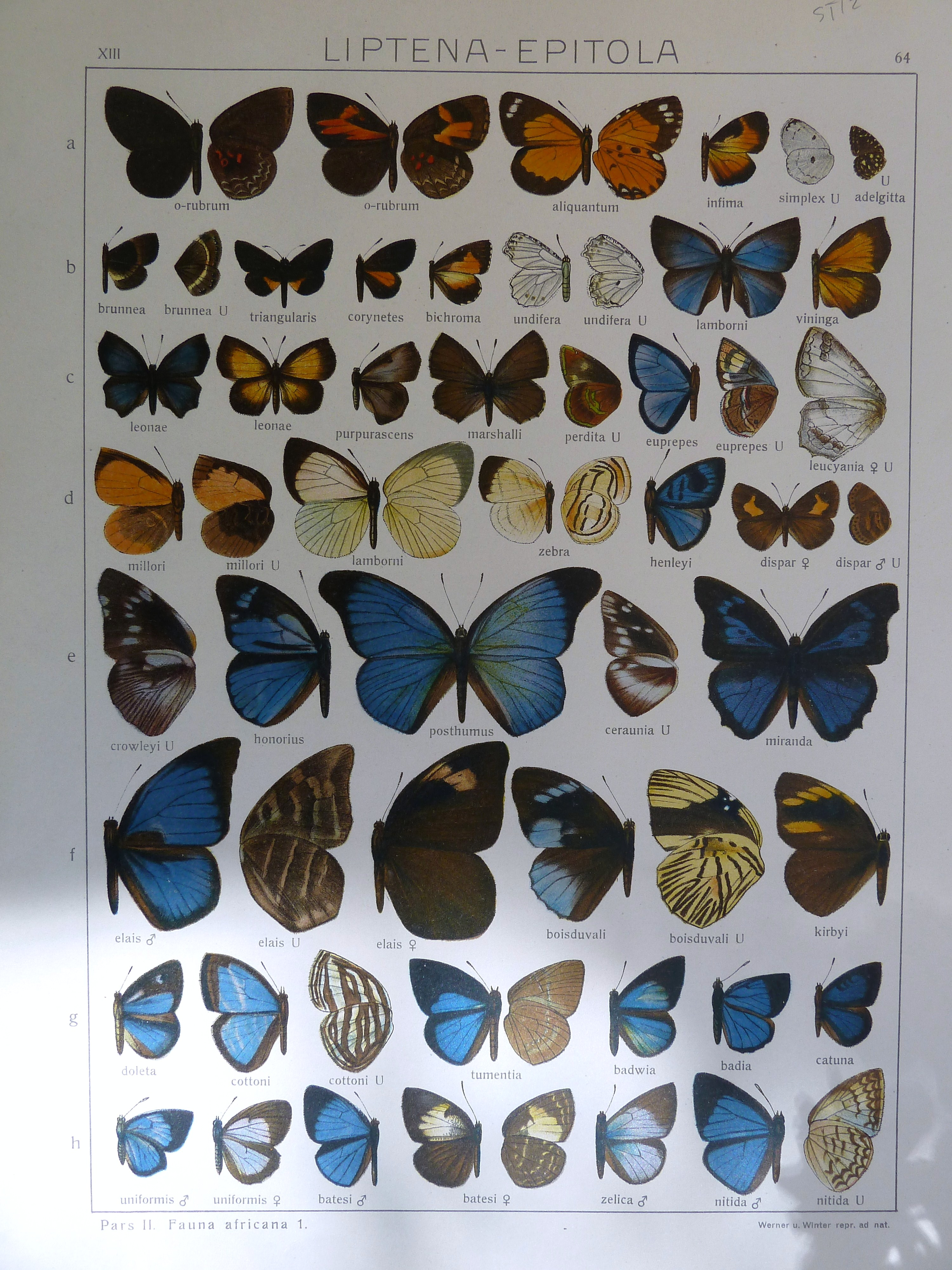
- in Seitz b

Scientific classification
- Domain: Eukaryota
- Kingdom: Animalia
- Phylum: Arthropoda
- Class: Insecta
- Order: Lepidoptera
- Family: Lycaenidae
- Genus: Eresinopsides
- Species: E. bichroma

Binomial name
- Eresinopsides bichroma Strand, 1911

Synonyms
- Pseuderesia staphyla Hulstaert, 1924

= Eresinopsides bichroma =

Species of butterfly

Eresinopsides bichroma is a butterfly in the family Lycaenidae. It is found in Kenya and Tanzania. The habitat consists of dense coastal and lowland forests.

== Subspecies ==
- Eresinopsides bichroma bichroma (north-eastern Tanzania)
- Eresinopsides bichroma jefferyi Stempffer, 1950 (coast of Kenya)
