= Euthecta cooksoni =

Conservation status
- Least Concern (IUCN 3.1)

Scientific classification
- Kingdom: Animalia
- Phylum: Arthropoda
- Class: Insecta
- Order: Lepidoptera
- Family: Lycaenidae
- Genus: Euthecta
- Species: E. cooksoni

Binomial name
- Euthecta cooksoni Bennett, 1954

Species of butterfly

Euthecta cooksoni, the Cookson's buff, is a butterfly in the family Lycaenidae. It is found in Tanzania and Mozambique.

Euthecta cooksoni is a species of the coastal forests of East Africa, currently known from just five localities but three subspecies: from the Kitchi Hills Forest (up to 40 km inland) and the Rondo area of Tanzania, and from the southernmost coastal forests of Mozambique. This area is poorly collected and the species must be highly under reported. Nonetheless, the extent of occurrence is large and also stretches over several thousand kilometres of completely unexplored country between Rondo and Amatongas. Therefore, the species is best classified as being of least concern.

== Subspecies ==
- Euthecta cooksoni cooksoni (Mozambique)
- Euthecta cooksoni marginata Henning & Henning, 2004 (Tanzania)
- Euthecta cooksoni subgrisea Henning & Henning, 2004 (south-eastern Tanzania)
