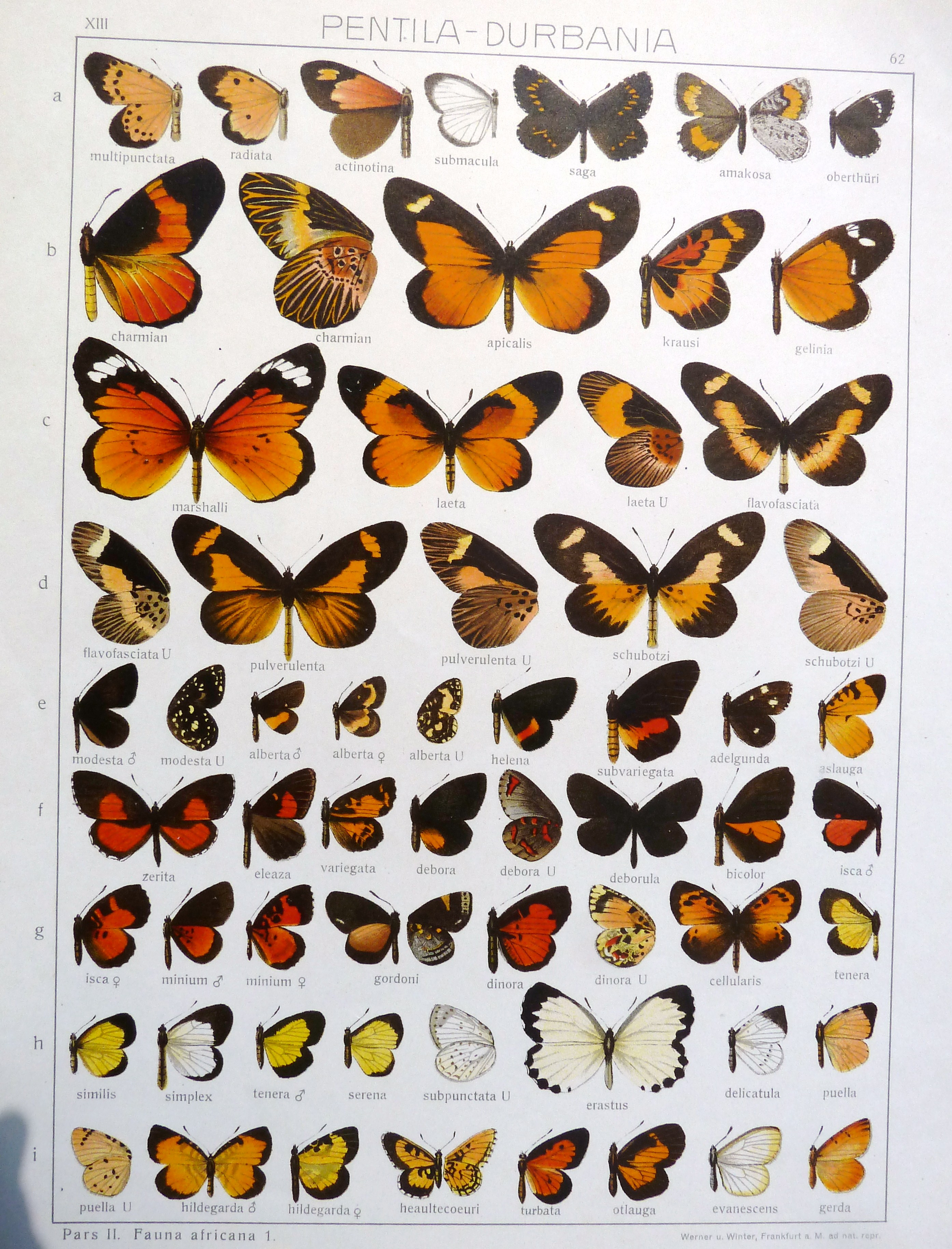
- In Adalbert Seitz's Fauna Africana

Scientific classification
- Domain: Eukaryota
- Kingdom: Animalia
- Phylum: Arthropoda
- Class: Insecta
- Order: Lepidoptera
- Family: Lycaenidae
- Genus: Durbaniopsis
- Species: D. saga

Binomial name
- Durbaniopsis saga (Trimen, 1883)

Synonyms
- Durbania saga Trimen, 1883

= Durbaniopsis saga =

Species of butterfly

Durbaniopsis saga, the Boland rocksitter, is a butterfly of the family Lycaenidae. It is found in South Africa in a wide area in the inland of the Western Cape and Northern Cape mountains, from the Nieuwoudtville mountains south to the Cederberg, Koue Bokkeveld, the Hex River and the Hawequas mountains. It is also present on low altitudes from Lambert's Bay inland to Het Kruis.

The wingspan is 26–39 mm for males and 29–40 mm for females. Adults are on wing from October to December, but as early as September at lower altitudes. There is one generation per year.

The larvae feed on cyanobacteria species.
