= Euthecta =

Scientific classification
- Domain: Eukaryota
- Kingdom: Animalia
- Phylum: Arthropoda
- Class: Insecta
- Order: Lepidoptera
- Family: Lycaenidae
- Subfamily: Poritiinae
- Genus: Euthecta; Bennett, 1954

Butterfly genus in family Lycaenidae

Euthecta is a genus of butterflies in the family Lycaenidae. The two members (species) of this genus are endemic to the Afrotropical realm.

== Species ==
- Euthecta cooksoni Bennett, 1954
- Euthecta cordeiroi Henning & Henning, 2004
