= Obania tullia =

Scientific classification
- Kingdom: Animalia
- Phylum: Arthropoda
- Class: Insecta
- Order: Lepidoptera
- Family: Lycaenidae
- Genus: Obania
- Species: O. tullia

Binomial name
- Obania tullia (Staudinger, 1892)

Synonyms
- Pseuderesia tullia Staudinger, 1892; Liptena tullia

Species of butterfly

Obania tullia, the orange obania, is a butterfly in the family Lycaenidae. It is found in Nigeria (the Cross River loop), Cameroon, Gabon and the Republic of the Congo. Its natural habitat is African tropical forests.
