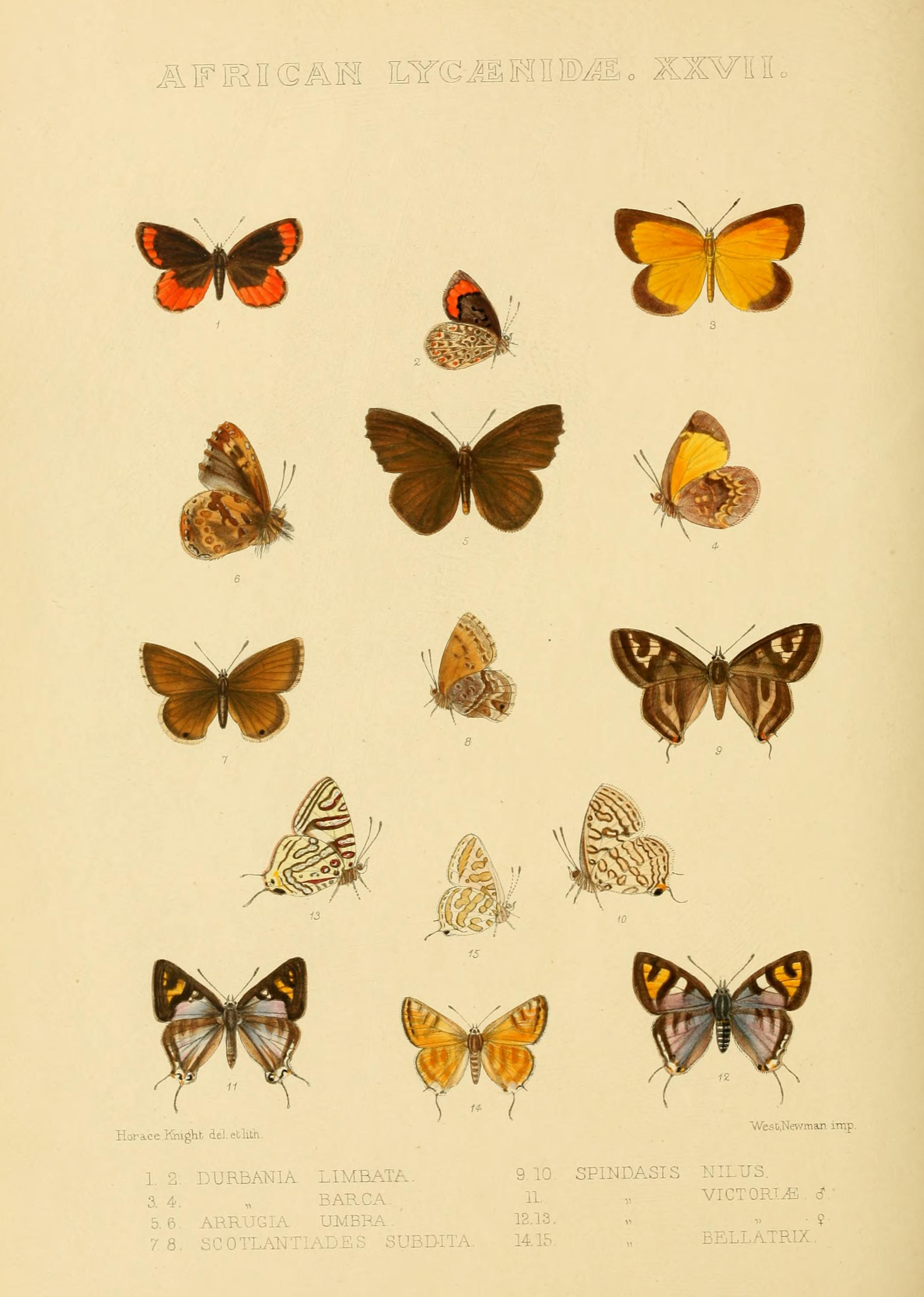
- Figures 3 and 4

Scientific classification
- Domain: Eukaryota
- Kingdom: Animalia
- Phylum: Arthropoda
- Class: Insecta
- Order: Lepidoptera
- Family: Lycaenidae
- Genus: Deloneura
- Species: D. barca

Binomial name
- Deloneura barca (Grose-Smith, 1901)

Synonyms
- Durbania barca Grose-Smith, 1901

= Deloneura barca =

Species of butterfly

Deloneura barca is a butterfly in the family Lycaenidae. It is found in Angola.
