= Toxochitona =

Scientific classification
- Domain: Eukaryota
- Kingdom: Animalia
- Phylum: Arthropoda
- Class: Insecta
- Order: Lepidoptera
- Family: Lycaenidae
- Subfamily: Poritiinae
- Genus: Toxochitona; Stempffer, 1956

Butterfly genus in family Lycaenidae

Toxochitona is a genus of butterflies in the family Lycaenidae. The species of this genus are endemic to the Afrotropical realm.

== Species ==
- Toxochitona ankole Stempffer, 1967
- Toxochitona gerda (Kirby, 1890)
- Toxochitona sankuru Stempffer, 1961
- Toxochitona vansomereni (Stempffer, 1954)
