= Durbaniopsis =

Scientific classification
- Domain: Eukaryota
- Kingdom: Animalia
- Phylum: Arthropoda
- Class: Insecta
- Order: Lepidoptera
- Family: Lycaenidae
- Subfamily: Poritiinae
- Genus: Durbaniopsis van Son, 1959

Butterfly genus in family Lycaenidae

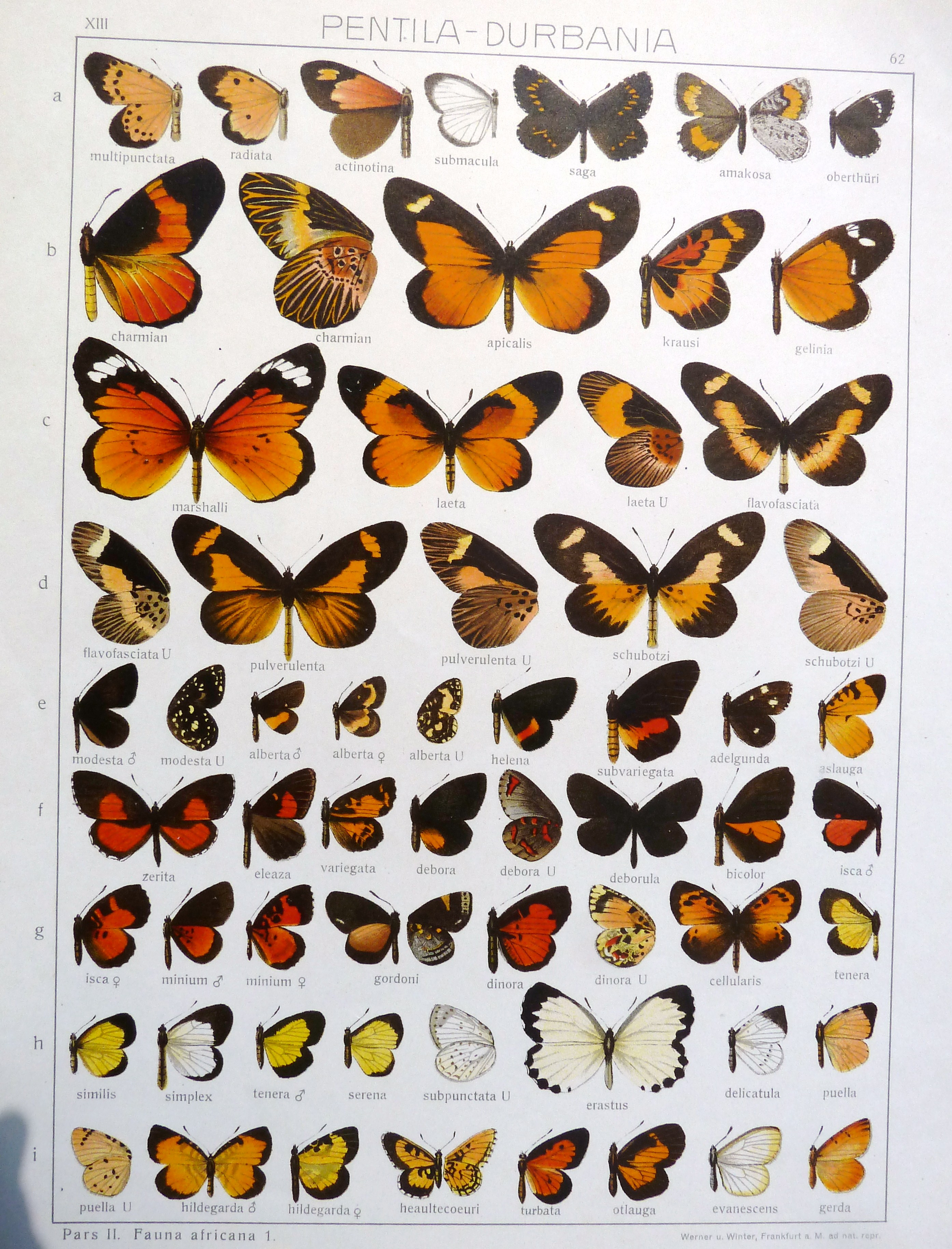

Durbaniopsis is a genus of butterflies in the family Lycaenidae. The single species is endemic to the Afrotropics.

== Species ==
- Durbaniopsis saga (Trimen, 1883)
