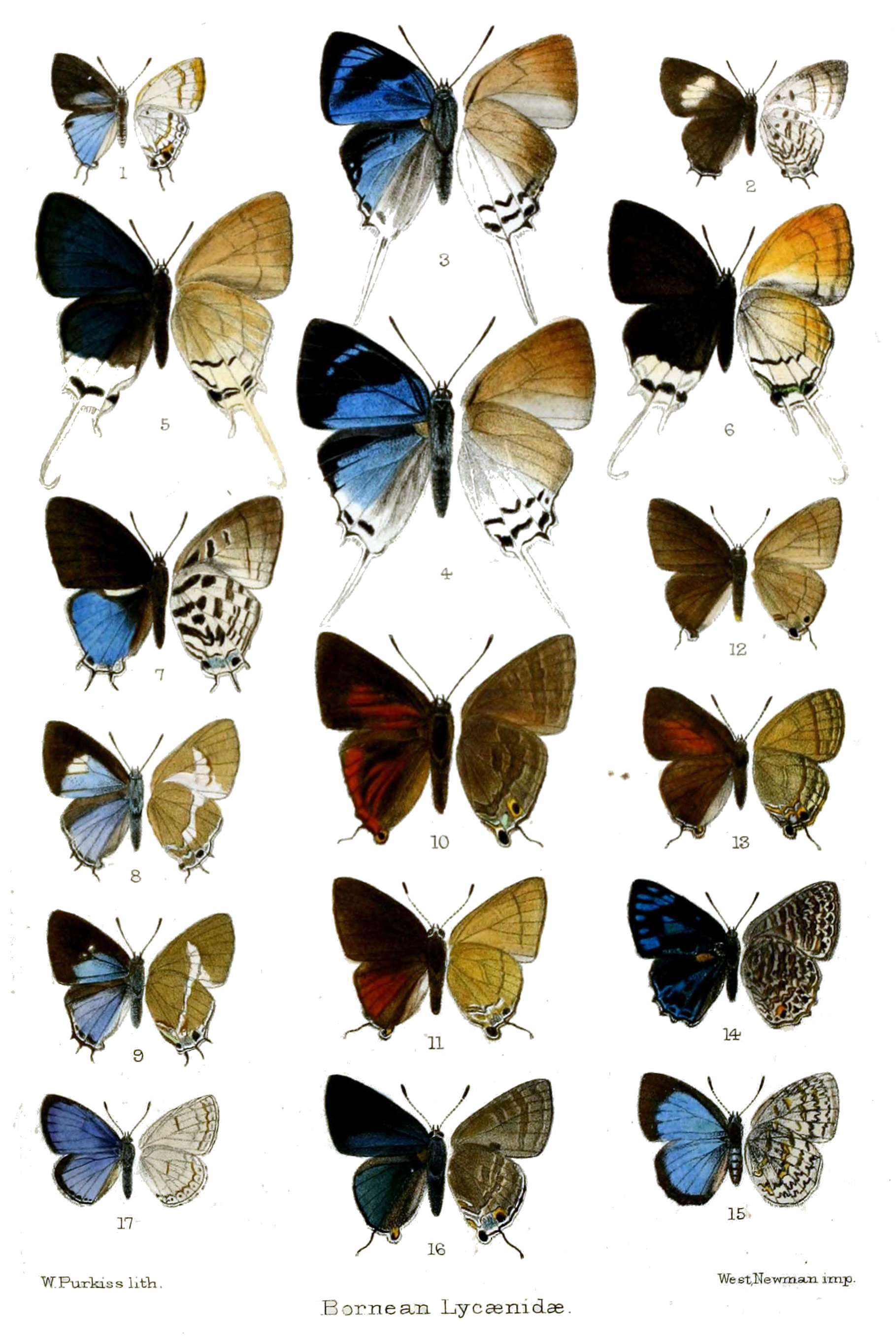
- Poriskina phakos figure 15

Scientific classification
- Domain: Eukaryota
- Kingdom: Animalia
- Phylum: Arthropoda
- Class: Insecta
- Order: Lepidoptera
- Family: Lycaenidae
- Subfamily: Poritiinae
- Genus: Poriskina; H. H. Druce, 1895
- Species: P. phakos

Binomial name
- Poriskina phakos H. H. Druce, 1895

= Poriskina =

Monotypic butterfly genus in family Lycaenidae

Poriskina is a monotypic butterfly genus in the family Lycaenidae. Its sole species, Poriskina phakos, is known from Mindanao in the Philippines. Both the genus and the species were first described by Hamilton Herbert Druce in 1895.
