= Congdonia duplex =

Scientific classification
- Kingdom: Animalia
- Phylum: Arthropoda
- Clade: Pancrustacea
- Class: Insecta
- Order: Lepidoptera
- Family: Lycaenidae
- Subfamily: Poritiinae
- Tribe: Liptenini
- Subtribe: Liptenina
- Genus: Congdonia; Henning & Henning, 2004
- Species: C. duplex

Binomial name
- Congdonia duplex Henning & Henning, 2004

Species of butterfly

Congdonia is a genus of butterflies in the family Lycaenidae. It contains only one species, Congdonia duplex, which is found in south-eastern Tanzania (the genus is endemic to the Afrotropics). Its habitat consists of montane forests.

Adults have been recorded on wing in February.
