= Diminutina =

Scientific classification
- Kingdom: Animalia
- Phylum: Arthropoda
- Class: Insecta
- Order: Lepidoptera
- Family: Lycaenidae
- Genus: Diminutina

Butterfly genus in family Lycaenidae

Diminutina is a genus of butterflies in the family Lycaenidae. Its type species is Diminutina tyriam.
