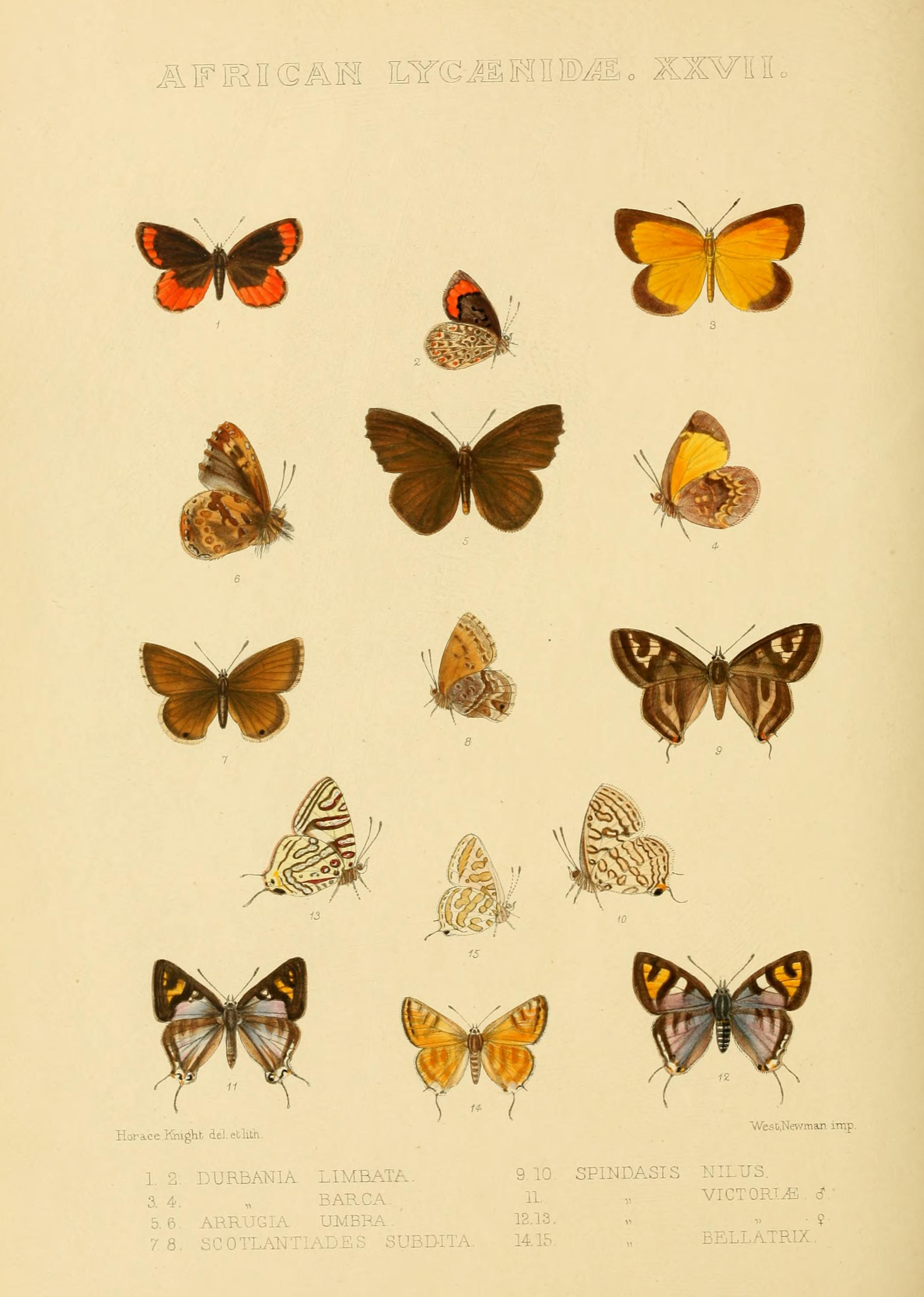
- Deloneura barca figures 3, 4

Scientific classification
- Domain: Eukaryota
- Kingdom: Animalia
- Phylum: Arthropoda
- Class: Insecta
- Order: Lepidoptera
- Family: Lycaenidae
- Subfamily: Poritiinae
- Genus: Deloneura; Trimen, 1868

Synonyms
- Poultonia Neave, 1904; Ebepius Hemming, 1964

= Deloneura =

Butterfly genus in family Lycaenidae

Deloneura is a genus of butterflies in the family Lycaenidae, endemic to the Afrotropics.

== Species ==
- Deloneura abri Congdon & Collins, 1998
- Deloneura barca (Grose-Smith, 1901)
- Deloneura immaculata Trimen, 1868
- Deloneura millari Trimen, 1906
- Deloneura ochrascens (Neave, 1904)
- Deloneura sheppardi Stevenson, 1934
- Deloneura subfusca Hawker-Smith, 1933
