= Decussata (butterfly) =

Scientific classification
- Domain: Eukaryota
- Kingdom: Animalia
- Phylum: Arthropoda
- Class: Insecta
- Order: Lepidoptera
- Family: Lycaenidae
- Genus: Decussata; Johnson, Austin, Le Crom & Salazar, 1997

Butterfly genus in family Lycaenidae

Decussata is a genus of butterflies in the family Lycaenidae. It is a junior synonym of Ostrinotes Johnson, Austin, Le Crom & Salazar, 1997
