= Durbaniella =

Clark's rocksitter

Scientific classification
- Kingdom: Animalia
- Phylum: Arthropoda
- Class: Insecta
- Order: Lepidoptera
- Family: Lycaenidae
- Genus: Durbaniella
- Species: D. clarki

Binomial name
- Durbaniella clarki (van Son, 1941)

Synonyms
- Durbania clarki van Son, 1941

Butterfly genus in family Lycaenidae

Durbaniella is a genus of butterflies in the family Lycaenidae. The single species, Durbaniella clarki, the Clark's rocksitter, is found in South Africa.

The wingspan is 18–24 mm for males and 18–26 mm for females. Adults are on wing from September to December. There is one generation per year.

The larvae feed on cyanobacteria.

== Subspecies ==
- D. c. clarki (Western Cape from Langeberg along Swartberg to Kammanassieberg, Schoemanspoort and along Witteberge to Willowmore)
- D. c. belladonna Ball, 1994 (low altitude rocky riverbeds near Jansenville in the Eastern Cape)
- D. c. jenniferae Ball, 1994 (along the Outeniqua range, the Tsitsikamma and Baviaanskloof ranges to Uitenhage)
- D. c. phaea Ball, 1994 (Riviersonderend Mountains and the hills between Worcester and Montagu in the Western Cape)
