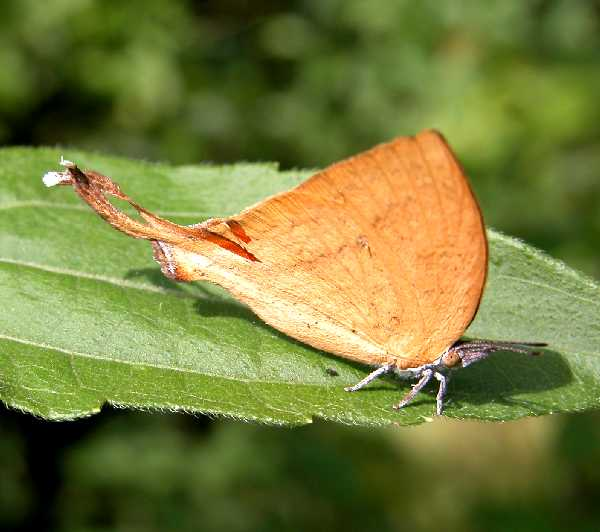
- Yamfly, Loxura atymnus

Scientific classification
- Kingdom: Animalia
- Phylum: Arthropoda
- Clade: Pancrustacea
- Class: Insecta
- Order: Lepidoptera
- Family: Lycaenidae
- Subfamily: Theclinae
- Tribe: Loxurini; Eliot, 1973

Genera
- See text

= Loxurini =

Tribe of butterflies

The Loxurini are a small tribe of butterflies in the family Lycaenidae.

== Genera ==
As not all Theclinae have been assigned to tribes, the genus list is preliminary. Dapidodigma, sometimes placed here, rather seems to belong to the Cheritrini, however.

- Drina
- Eooxylides
- Loxura
- Neomyrina
- Thamala
- Yasoda
