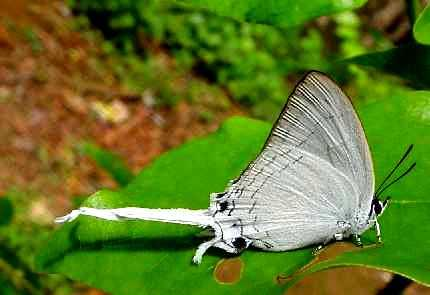
- Common imperial, Cheritra freja

Scientific classification
- Kingdom: Animalia
- Phylum: Arthropoda
- Clade: Pancrustacea
- Class: Insecta
- Order: Lepidoptera
- Family: Lycaenidae
- Subfamily: Theclinae
- Tribe: Cheritrini; Swinhoe, 1910

Genera
- Seven, and see text

= Cheritrini =

Tribe of butterflies

The Cheritrini are a small tribe of butterflies in the family Lycaenidae; they contain the imperials and allies. Their closest living relatives seem to be the Horagini; indeed, the genus Ahmetia (formerly called Cowania) was in the past often placed there.

== Genera ==
As not all Theclinae have been assigned to tribes, the genus list is preliminary. Dapidodigma, sometimes allied with the Loxurini instead (though this seems to be in error), is the most basal living genus of Cheritrini. The others seem to form a close-knit and more apomorphic radiation.

1. Ahmetia (formerly Cowania)
2. Cheritra Moore, 1881 – typical imperials
3. Cheritrella – truncate Imperial (monotypic)
4. Dapidodigma Karsch, 1895
5. Drupadia – posies
6. Ritra de Nicéville, 1890
7. Ticherra – blue imperial

== Footnotes ==
- Media related to Cheritrini at Wikimedia Commons
