= Cowania =

Cowania may refer to:

- Cowania (plant), a flowering plant genus in family Rosaceae, often included within the genus Purshia
- Cowania (fly), a genus of fly in the family Tachinidae
- Cowania (butterfly), a gossamer-winged butterfly genus now called Ahmetia
