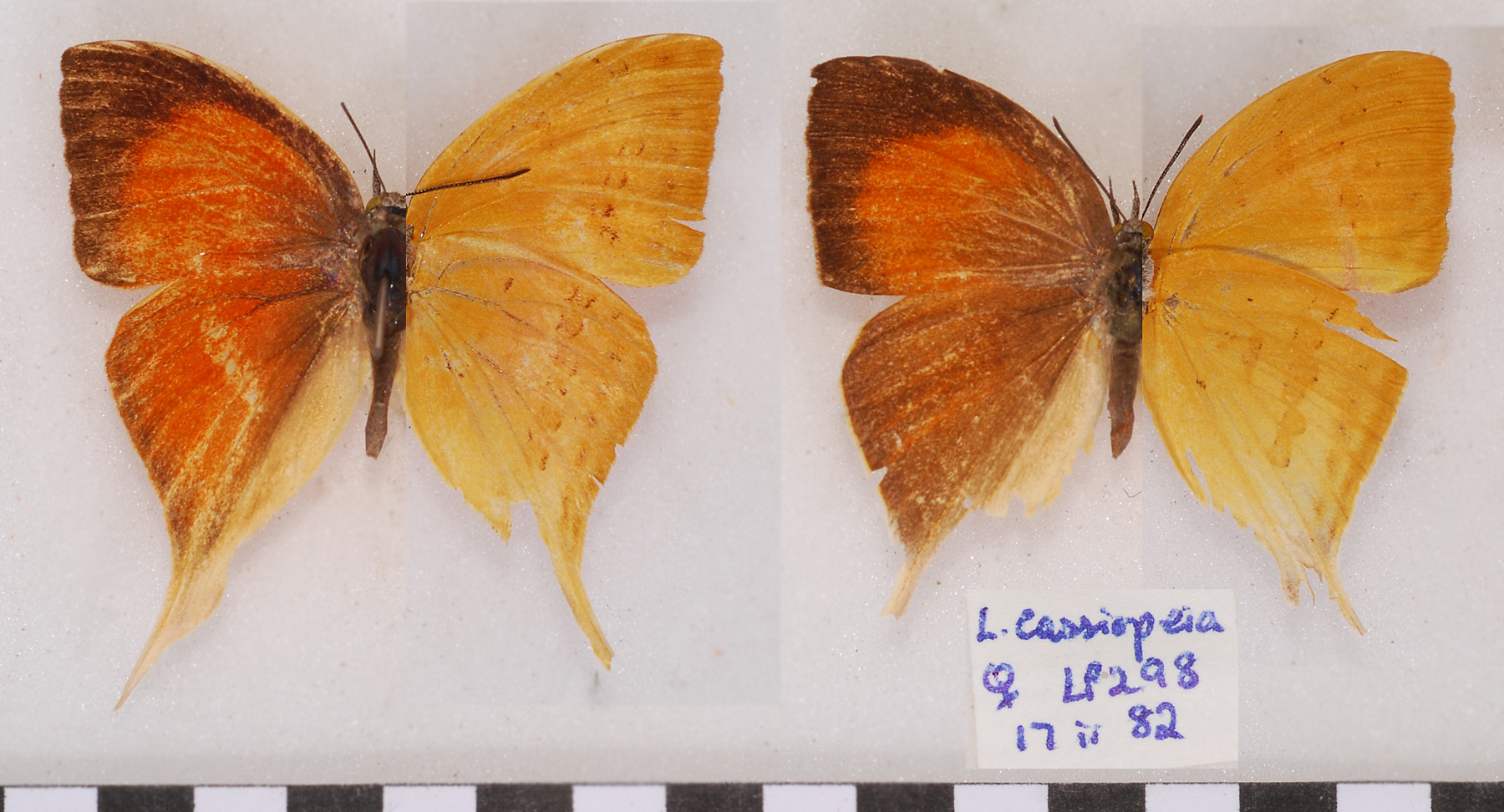

Scientific classification
- Kingdom: Animalia
- Phylum: Arthropoda
- Clade: Pancrustacea
- Class: Insecta
- Order: Lepidoptera
- Family: Lycaenidae
- Genus: Loxura
- Species: L. cassiopeia

Binomial name
- Loxura cassiopeia Distant, 1884

= Loxura cassiopeia =

Species of butterfly

Loxura cassiopeia is a butterfly in the family Lycaenidae.It was described by William Lucas Distant in 1884. It is found in the Indomalayan realm. It differs from Loxura atymnus by the invariably longer tails not being powdered with black

== Subspecies ==
- Loxura cassiopeia cassiopeia (Peninsular Malaysia, Thailand)
- Loxura cassiopeia amatica Fruhstorfer, 1912 (northern Borneo, Palawan)
- Loxura cassiopeia numana Fruhstorfer, 1912 (western Sumatra)
- Loxura cassiopeia fuscicaudata Fruhstorfer, 1912 (Nias)
- Loxura cassiopeia batunensis Fruhstorfer, 1913 (Batu)
- Loxura cassiopeia yilma Fruhstorfer, 1926 (Mindanao)
- Loxura cassiopeia ptesia Riley, 1945 (Mentawi)
- Loxura cassiopeia takioi Hayashi, 1976 (Palawan)
- Loxura cassiopeia owadai Hayashi, 1976 (Mindanao)
