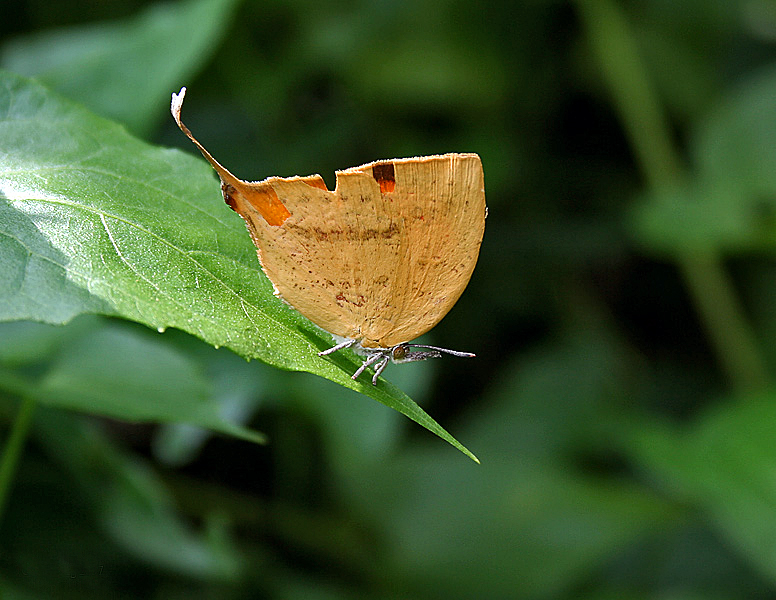
- Yamfly (Loxura atymnus)

Scientific classification
- Kingdom: Animalia
- Phylum: Arthropoda
- Clade: Pancrustacea
- Class: Insecta
- Order: Lepidoptera
- Family: Lycaenidae
- Tribe: Loxurini
- Genus: Loxura; Horsfield, 1829

= Loxura =

Butterfly genus in family Lycaenidae

Loxura is a genus of butterflies in the family Lycaenidae. The species in this genus are found in the Indomalayan realm (in southern and eastern Asia).

== Species ==
The genus includes the following species:

- Loxura atymnus (Stoll, [1780]) – yamfly
- Loxura cassiopeia Distant, 1884
