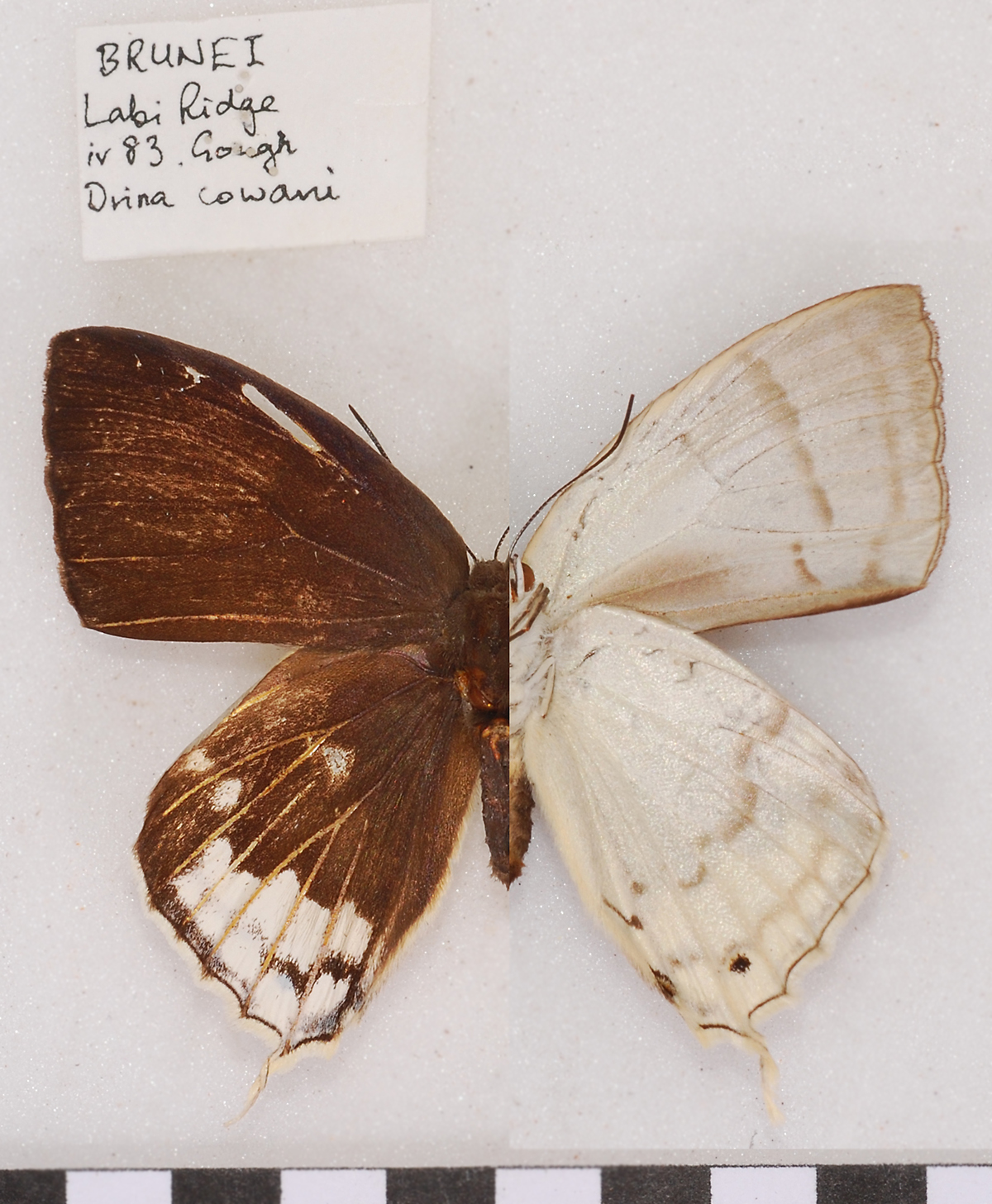
- Drina cowani

Scientific classification
- Domain: Eukaryota
- Kingdom: Animalia
- Phylum: Arthropoda
- Class: Insecta
- Order: Lepidoptera
- Family: Lycaenidae
- Genus: Drina
- Species: D. cowani

Binomial name
- Drina cowani Corbet, 1940.

= Drina cowani =

Species of butterfly

Drina cowani is a species of butterfly belonging to the lycaenid family described by Alexander Steven Corbet in 1940. It is found in the Indomalayan realm (Peninsular Malaya, Singapore).
