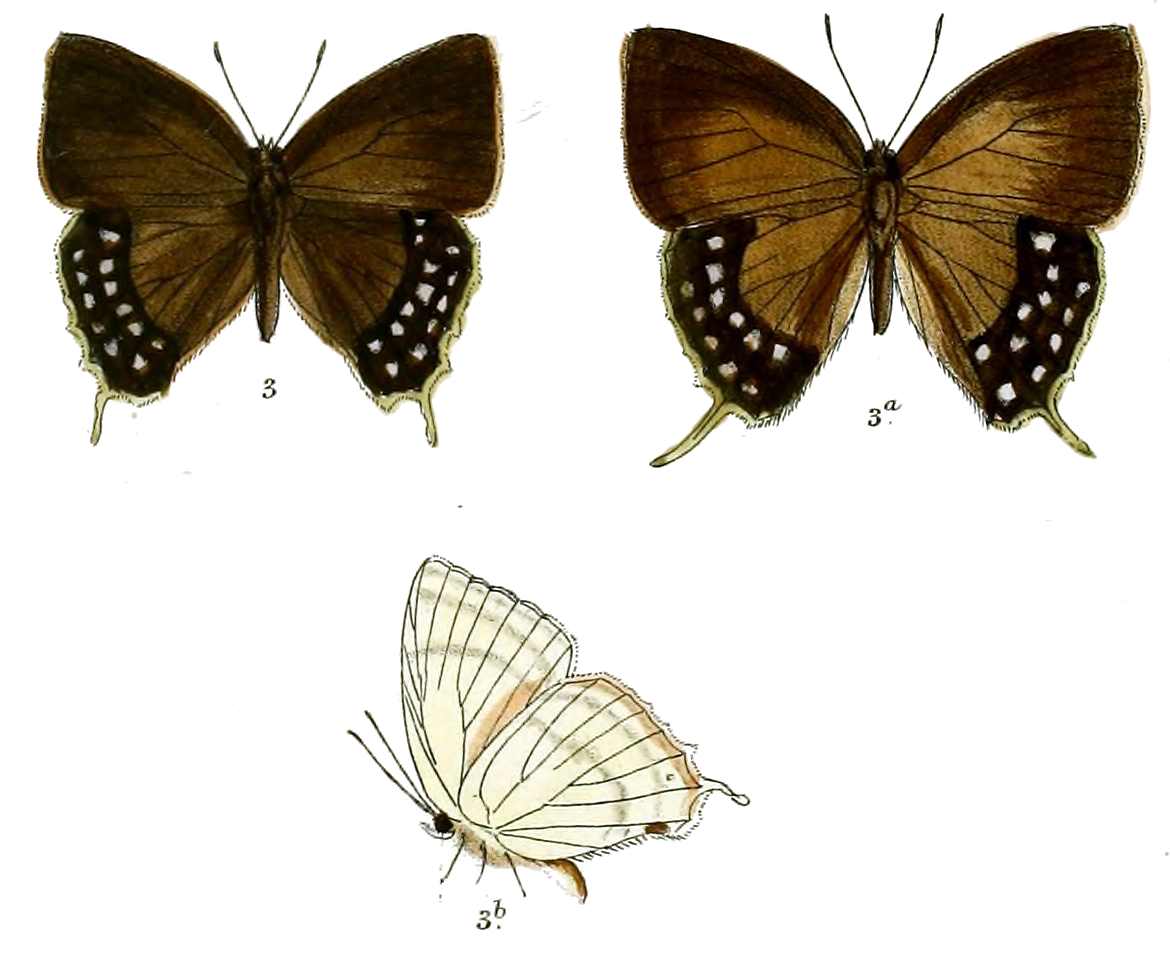

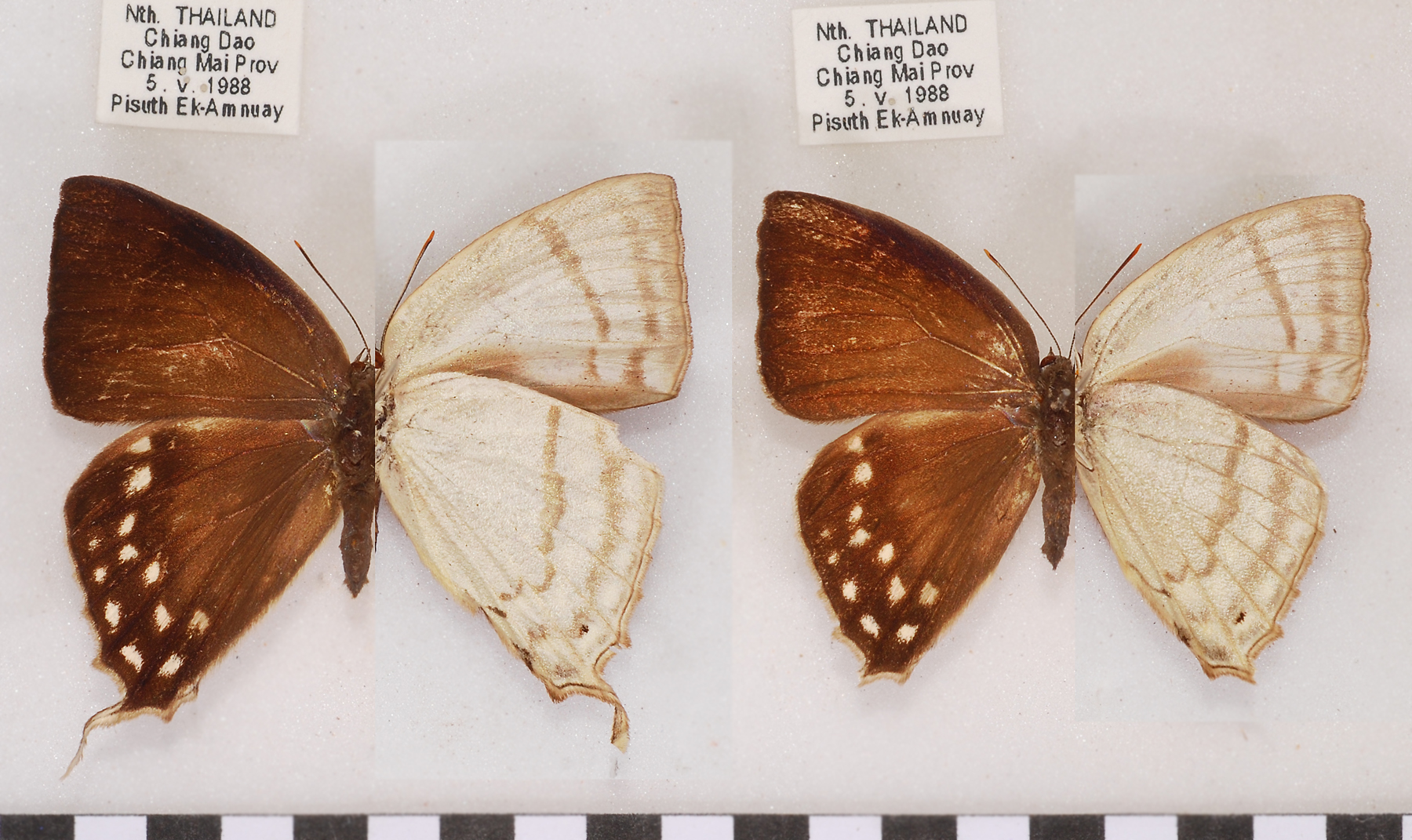

Scientific classification
- Kingdom: Animalia
- Phylum: Arthropoda
- Class: Insecta
- Order: Lepidoptera
- Family: Lycaenidae
- Genus: Drina
- Species: D. donina

Binomial name
- Drina donina (Hewitson, 1863)

= Drina donina =

Brown yamfly

Species of butterfly

Drina donina, the brown yamfly is a species of blue butterfly (Lycaenidae) found in Asia.

== Range ==
The butterfly occurs in India in the Lushai hills (Mizoram) and across to the Dawnas in Myanmar. The range extends eastwards to Indochina and southern Thailand, Peninsular Malaysia and Langkawi.

== Status ==
Not rare.

== See also ==
- List of butterflies of India (Lycaenidae)
