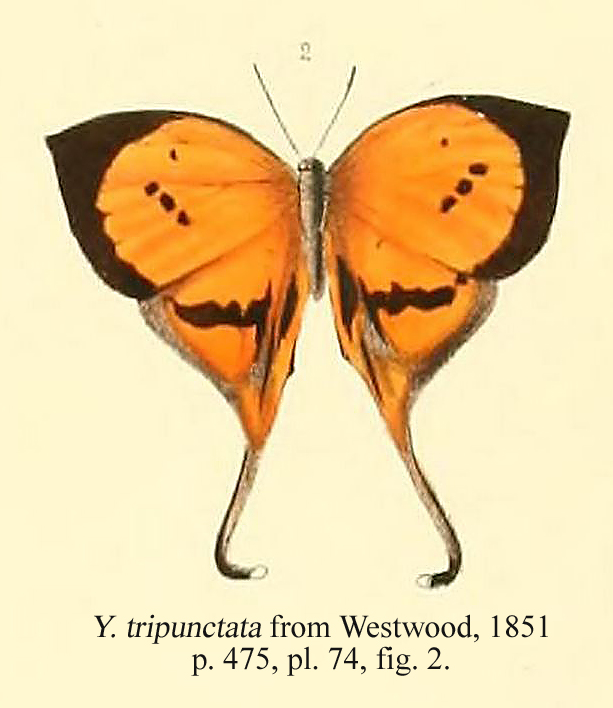

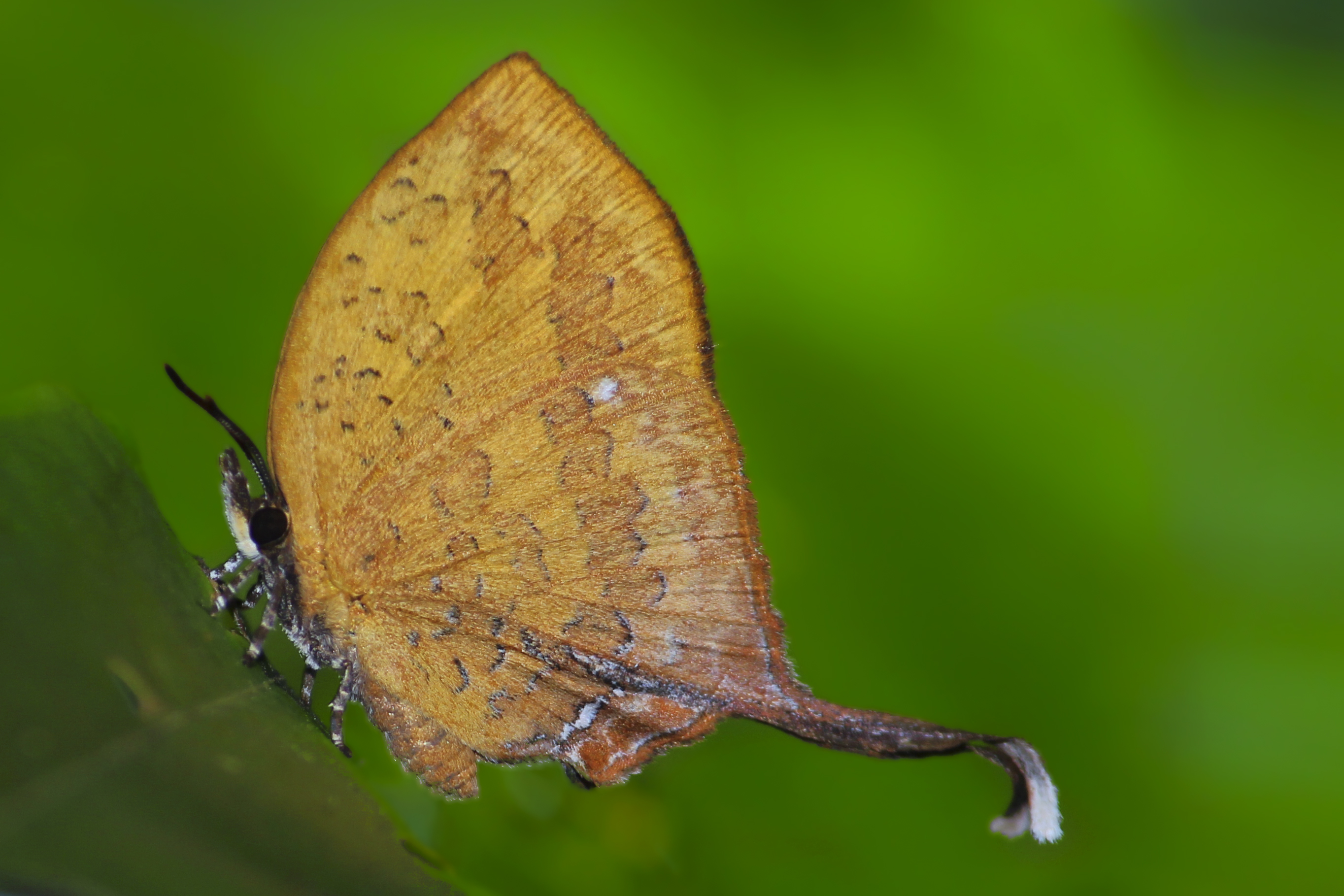

Scientific classification
- Kingdom: Animalia
- Phylum: Arthropoda
- Clade: Pancrustacea
- Class: Insecta
- Order: Lepidoptera
- Family: Lycaenidae
- Genus: Yasoda
- Species: Y. tripunctata

Binomial name
- Yasoda tripunctata (Hewitson, 1863)

= Yasoda tripunctata =

Branded yamfly

Species of butterfly

Yasoda tripunctata, the branded yamfly, is a species of blue butterfly (Lycaenidae) found in Asia.

== Range ==
The butterfly occurs in India in the Himalayas from Sikkim right across to central Myanmar and the Naga Hills. The range extends south-eastwards to Thailand, Laos, northern Vietnam and southern Yunnan.

== See also ==
- List of butterflies of India (Lycaenidae)
