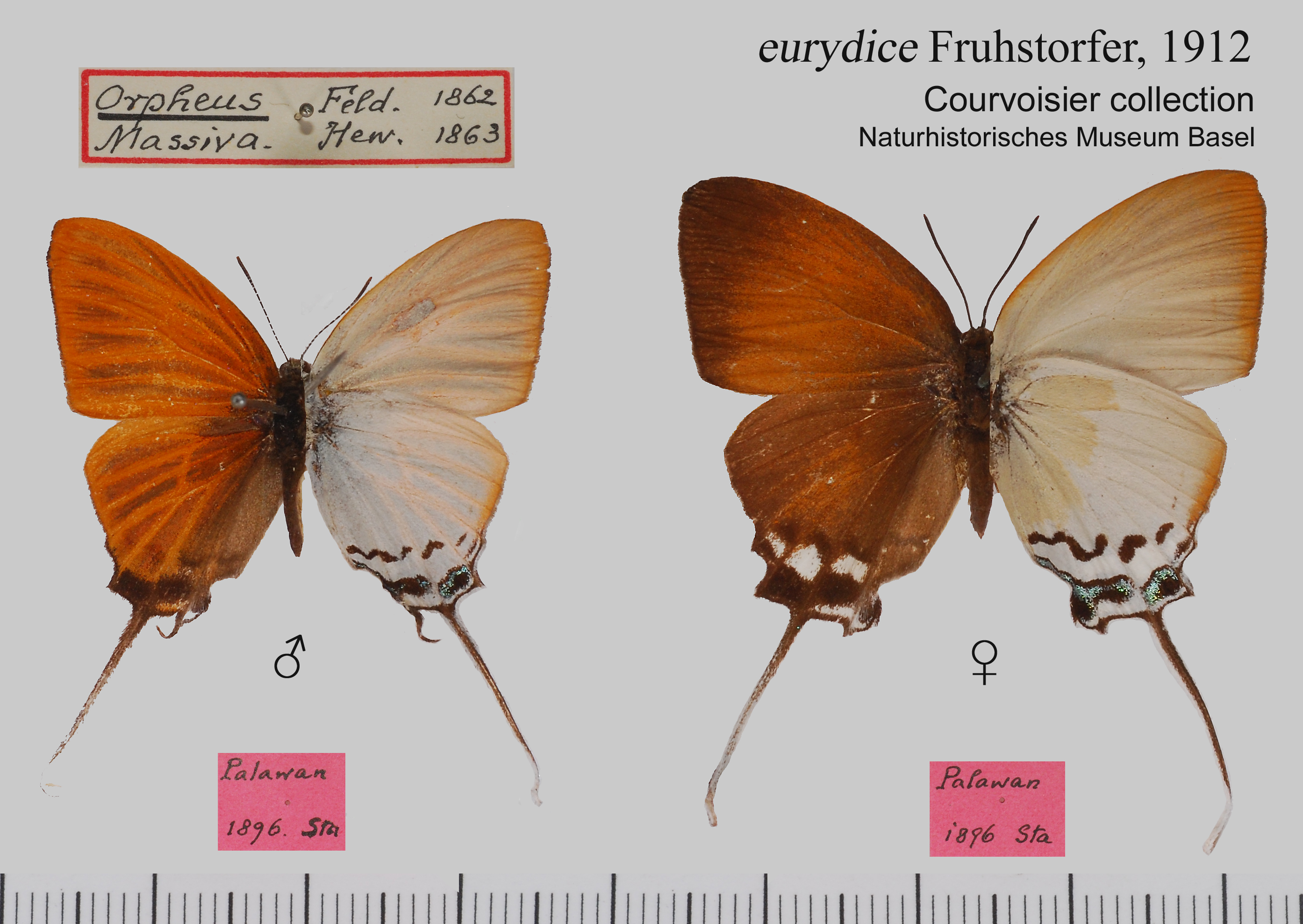
- Cheritra orpheus eurydice Courvoisier Collection, Basel

Scientific classification
- Kingdom: Animalia
- Phylum: Arthropoda
- Class: Insecta
- Order: Lepidoptera
- Family: Lycaenidae
- Genus: Cheritra
- Species: C. orpheus

Binomial name
- Cheritra orpheus (C. & R. Felder, 1862)

Synonyms
- Myrina orpheus C. & R. Felder, 1862; Cheritra massiva Hewitson, 1863

= Cheritra orpheus =

Species of butterfly

Cheritra orpheus is a butterfly in the family Lycaenidae. It was described by Cajetan Felder and Rudolf Felder in 1862. It is found in the Philippines in the Indomalayan realm.

== Subspecies ==
- C. o. orpheus (Philippines: Luzon, Mindoro, Ticao)
- C. o. eurydice Fruhstorfer, 1912 (Palawan)
- C. o. orphnine Cowan, 1967 (Philippines: Mindanao)
