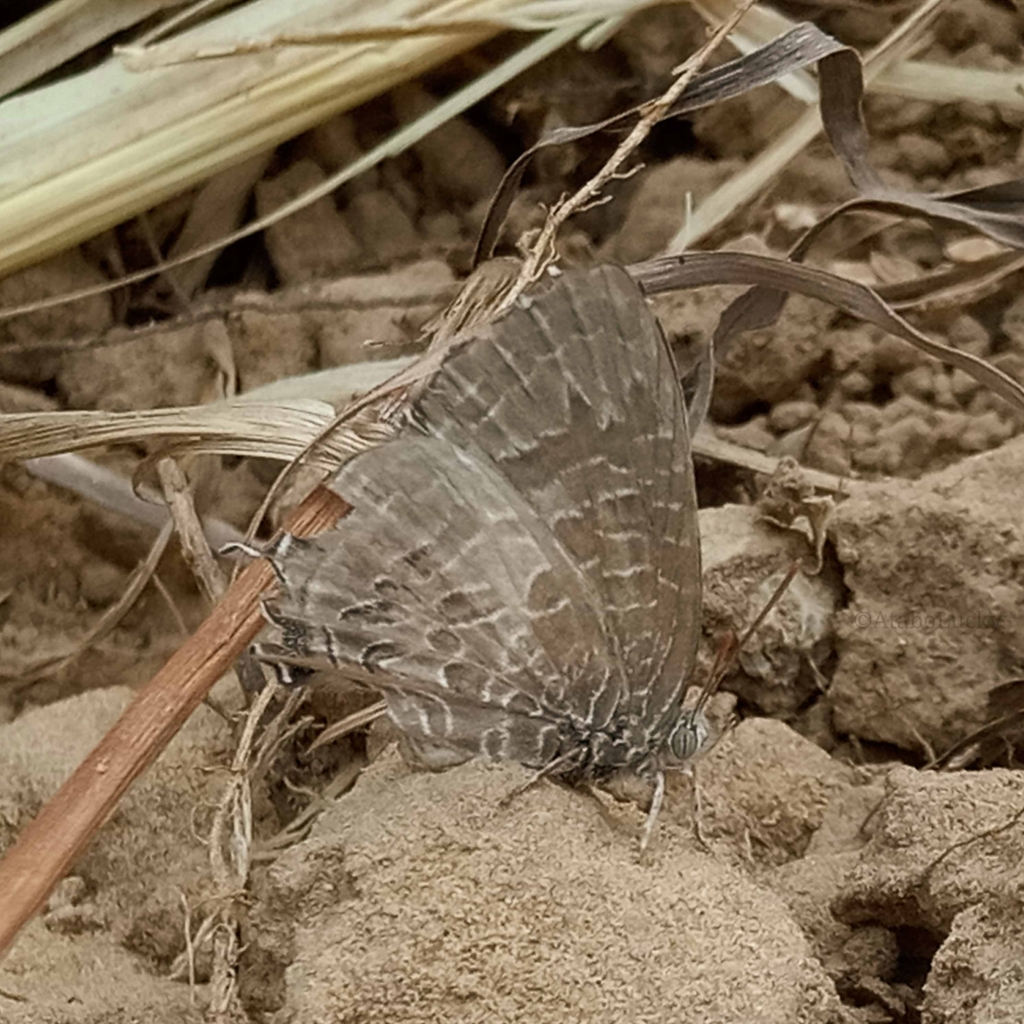

Scientific classification
- Kingdom: Animalia
- Phylum: Arthropoda
- Class: Insecta
- Order: Lepidoptera
- Family: Lycaenidae
- Genus: Dapidodigma
- Species: D. demeter

Binomial name
- Dapidodigma demeter Clench, 1961

= Dapidodigma demeter =

Species of butterfly

Dapidodigma demeter, the eastern virgin, is a butterfly in the family Lycaenidae. It is found in Africa, specially in the Ivory Coast, Ghana, Benin, Nigeria, Cameroon, the Republic of the Congo, Sudan, Angola, the Democratic Republic of the Congo, Zambia and Uganda. The habitat consists of rainforests.

The larvae feed on Albizia and Homalium species. Both the larvae and pupae are attended by ants.

== Images ==
External images from Royal Museum of Central Africa.

== Subspecies ==
- Dapidodigma demeter demeter (Ivory Coast, Ghana, Benin, Nigeria: south and the Cross River Loop, Cameroon, Congo)
- Dapidodigma demeter nuptus Clench, 1961 (Angola, Zambia, Uganda, Democratic Republic of the Congo: Uele, Tshuapa, Equateur, Kinshasa, Sankuru and Lualaba)
- Dapidodigma demeter sudsudana d'Abrera, 1980 (southern Sudan)
