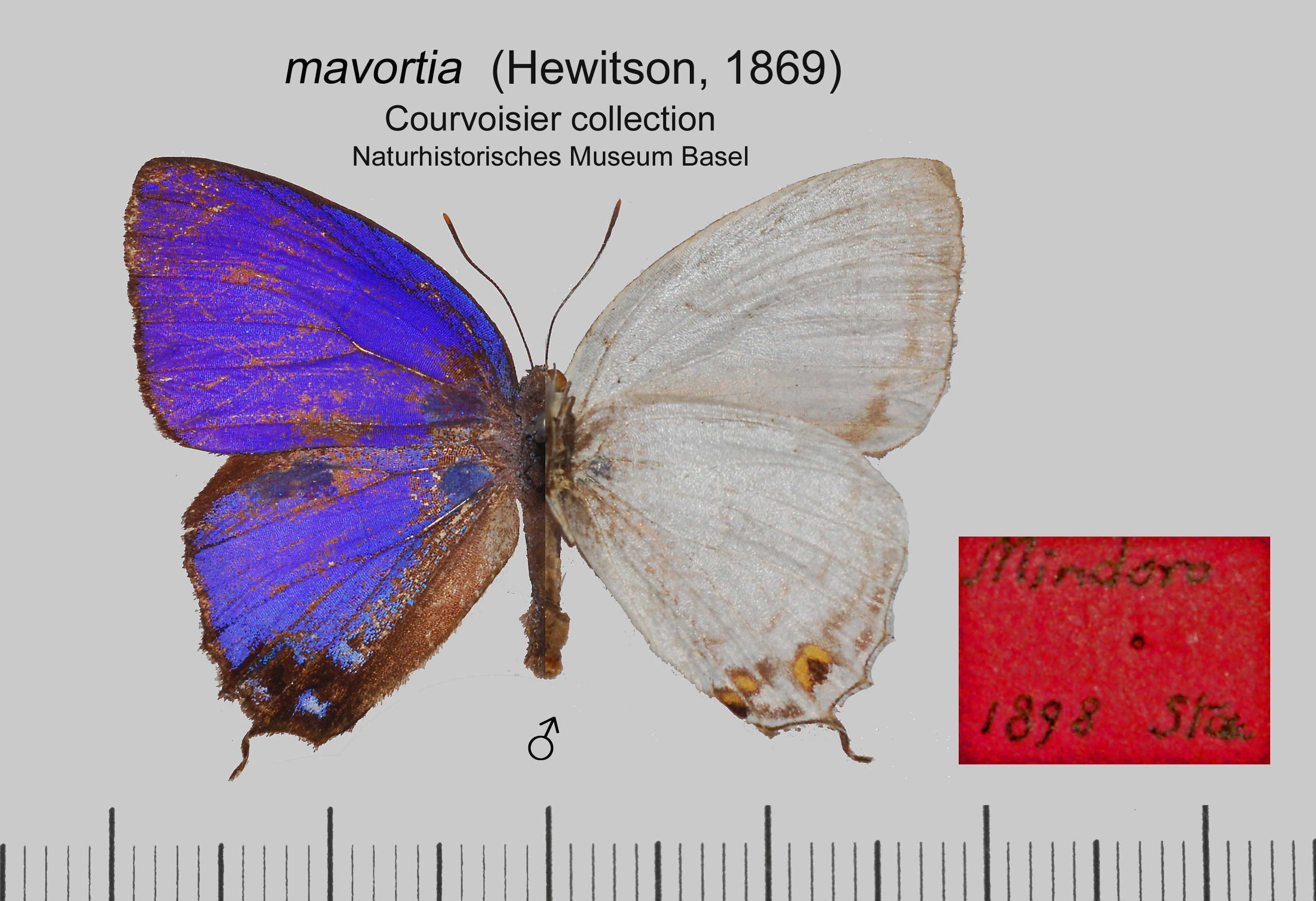
- Drina mavortia Courvoisier Collection, Basel

Scientific classification
- Domain: Eukaryota
- Kingdom: Animalia
- Phylum: Arthropoda
- Class: Insecta
- Order: Lepidoptera
- Family: Lycaenidae
- Genus: Drina
- Species: D. mavortia

Binomial name
- Drina mavortia (Hewitson, 1869)

Synonyms
- Myrina mavortia Hewitson, 1869

= Drina mavortia =

Species of butterfly

Drina mavortia is a butterfly in the family Lycaenidae. It was described by William Chapman Hewitson in 1869. It is endemic to the Philippines in the Indomalayan realm.
