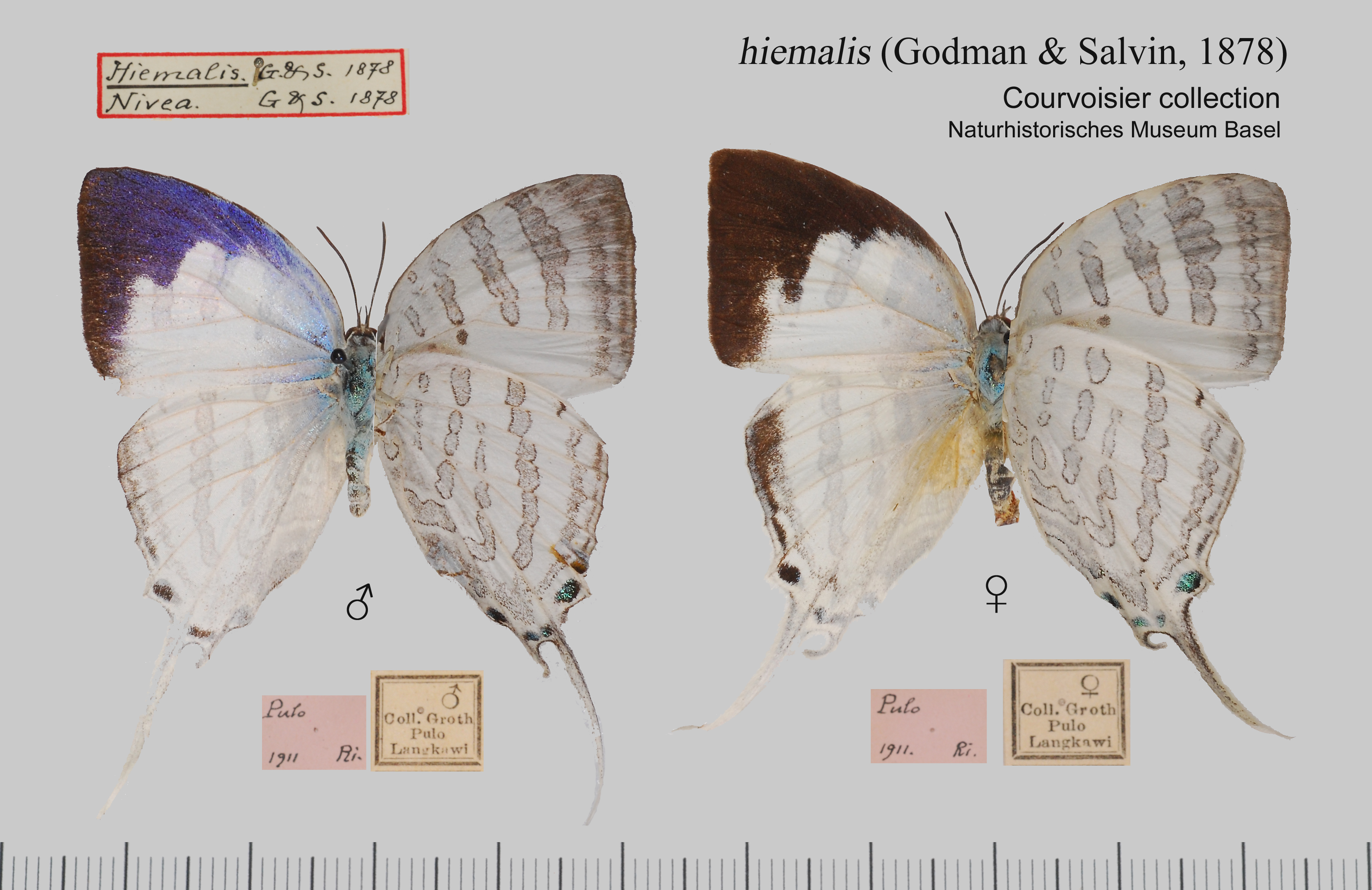

Scientific classification
- Domain: Eukaryota
- Kingdom: Animalia
- Phylum: Arthropoda
- Class: Insecta
- Order: Lepidoptera
- Family: Lycaenidae
- Tribe: Loxurini
- Genus: Neomyrina; Distant, 1884
- Species: N. nivea

Binomial name
- Neomyrina nivea (Godman & Salvin, 1878)

= Neomyrina =

Monotypic butterfly genus in family Lycaenidae

Neomyrina is a butterfly genus in the family Lycaenidae described by William Lucas Distant in 1884. It is monotypic, containing only the species Neomyrina nivea. Neomyrina nivea was described by Frederick DuCane Godman and Osbert Salvin in 1878. It is found in the Indomalayan realm.

== Subspecies ==
- N. n. nivea Belitung
- N. n. hiemalis (Godman & Salvin, 1878) Thailand, Malaysia
- N. n. periculosa Fruhstorfer, 1913 southern Myanmar - Thailand, Peninsular Malaya, Lankawi, Sumatra

== Biology ==
The larva feeds on Balanocarpus heimii (with ants).
