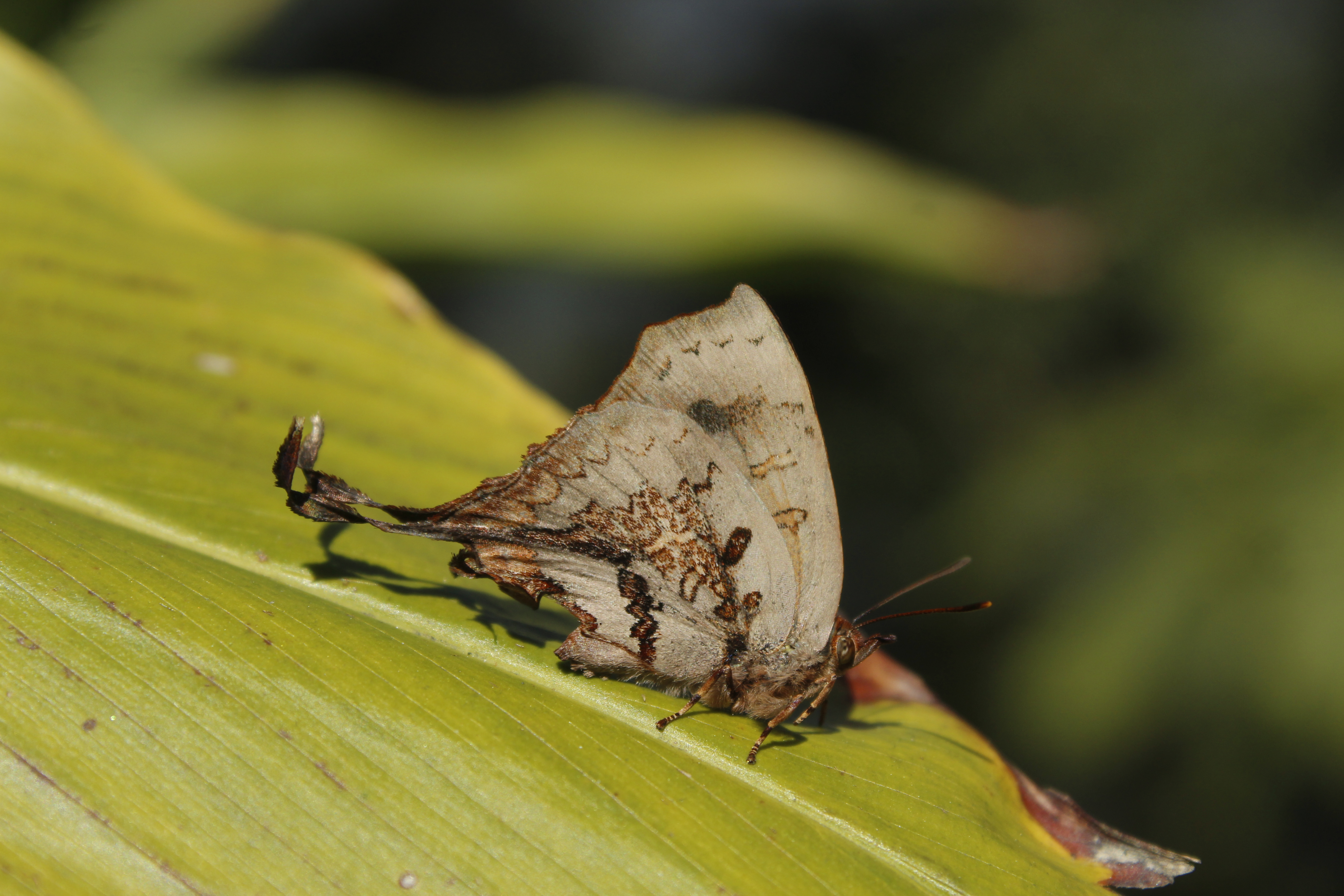

Scientific classification
- Kingdom: Animalia
- Phylum: Arthropoda
- Class: Insecta
- Order: Lepidoptera
- Family: Lycaenidae
- Subfamily: Theclinae
- Tribe: Cheritrini
- Genus: Cheritrella de Nicéville, 1887
- Species: C. truncipennis

Binomial name
- Cheritrella truncipennis de Nicéville 1887

= Cheritrella =

Truncate imperial

Genus of butterfly

Cheritrella truncipennis, the truncate imperial, is a small butterfly found in India (Sikkim - Assam), Burma and West China (Yunnan) that belongs to the lycaenids or blues family. Its genus, Cheritrella, was erected by Lionel de Nicéville and is monotypic.
