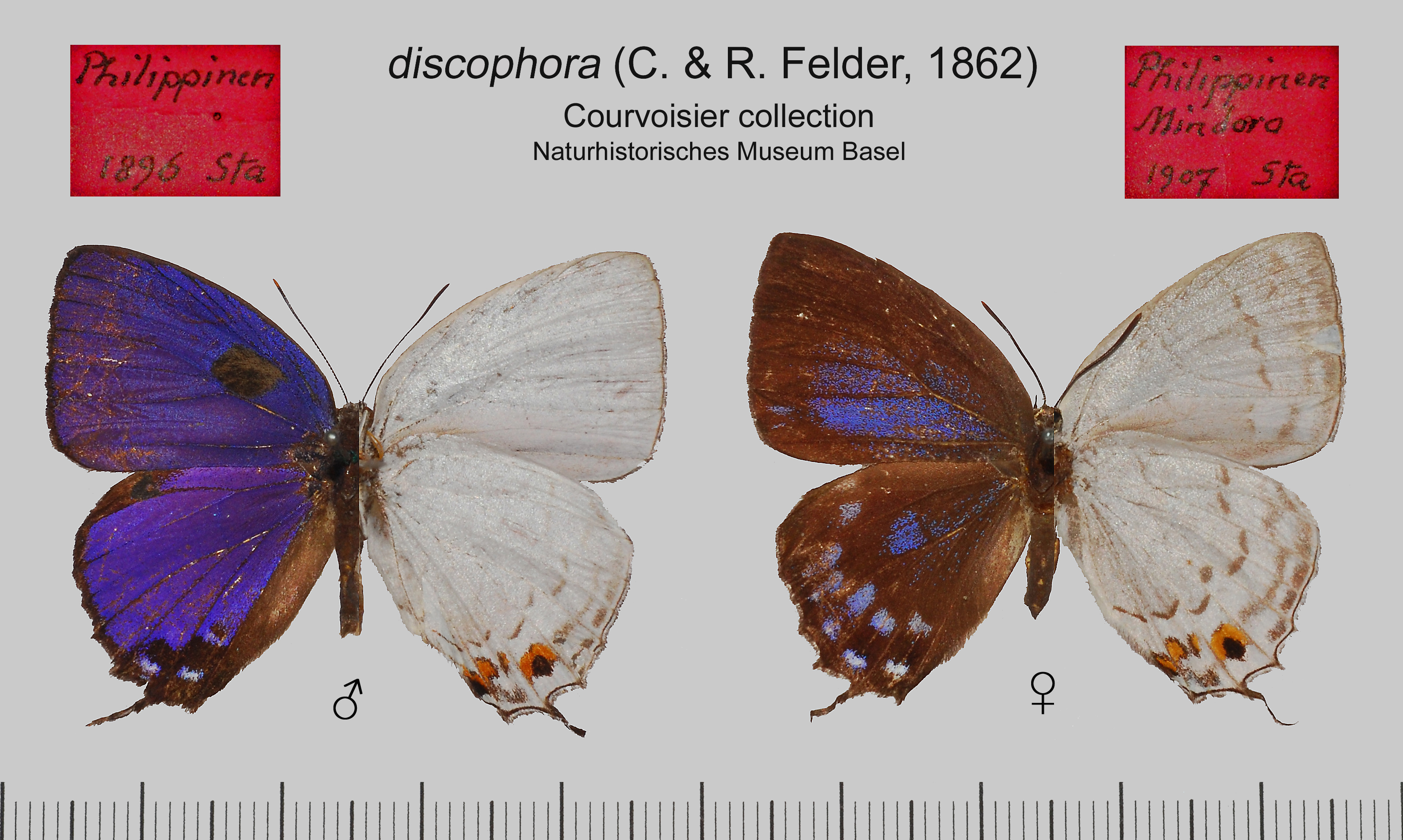
- Drina discophora Courvoisier Collection, Basel

Scientific classification
- Kingdom: Animalia
- Phylum: Arthropoda
- Class: Insecta
- Order: Lepidoptera
- Family: Lycaenidae
- Genus: Drina
- Species: D. discophora

Binomial name
- Drina discophora (C. Felder & R. Felder, 1862)

Synonyms
- Myrina discophora C. & R. Felder, 1862

= Drina discophora =

Species of butterfly

Drina discophora is a butterfly in the family Lycaenidae. It was described by Cajetan Felder and Rudolf Felder in 1862. It is endemic to the Philippines (Mindoro).
