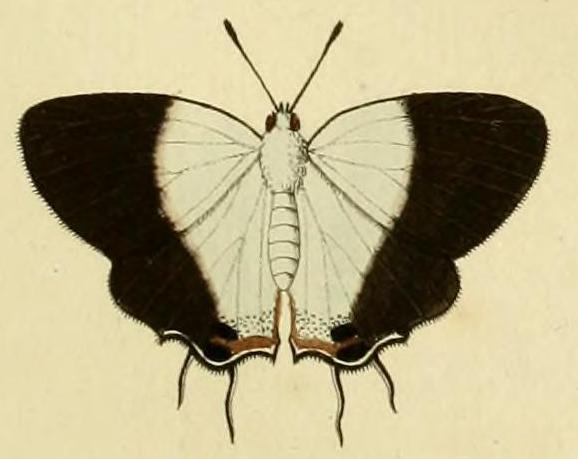

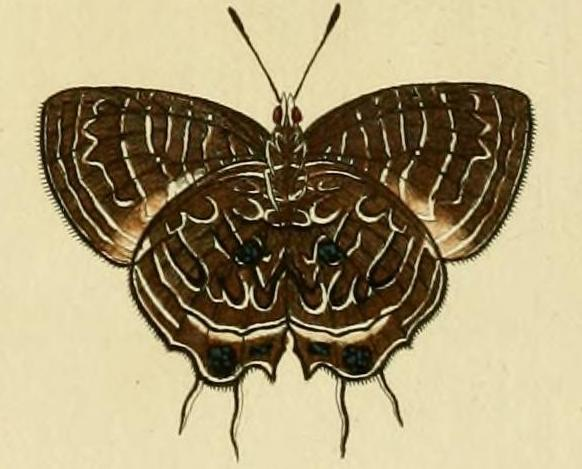

Scientific classification
- Kingdom: Animalia
- Phylum: Arthropoda
- Clade: Pancrustacea
- Class: Insecta
- Order: Lepidoptera
- Family: Lycaenidae
- Genus: Dapidodigma
- Species: D. hymen

Binomial name
- Dapidodigma hymen (Fabricius, 1775)

Synonyms
- Papilio hymen Fabricius, 1775; Papilio liger Cramer, 1779

= Dapidodigma hymen =

Western virgin

Species of butterfly

Dapidodigma hymen, the western virgin, is a butterfly in the family Lycaenidae. It is found in Senegal, the Gambia, Guinea-Bissau, Guinea, Burkina Faso, Sierra Leone, Liberia, Ivory Coast, Ghana, Togo, Nigeria (south and the Cross River Loop) and western Cameroon. The habitat consists of forests and scrubland.

The larvae possibly feed on Alchornea species, a plant usually colonized by tailor ants of the genus Oecophylla.

Torben Larsen developed a species numbering system for his 2005 publication Butterflies of West Africa. This species is #359. The 'Larsen' numbers have since been used with permission in A Sharp Eye on Butterflies of Ghana.
