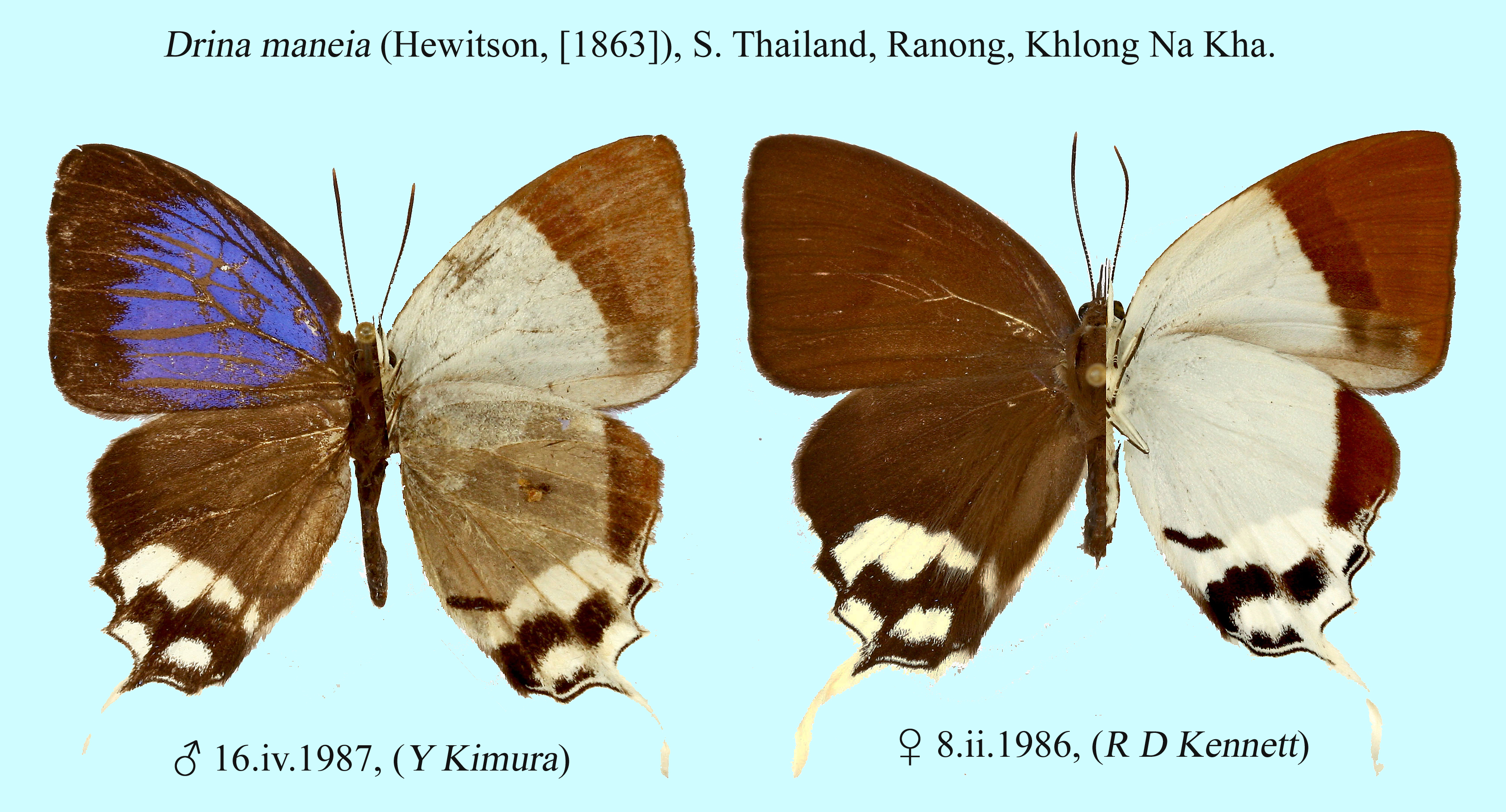

Scientific classification
- Kingdom: Animalia
- Phylum: Arthropoda
- Class: Insecta
- Order: Lepidoptera
- Family: Lycaenidae
- Genus: Drina
- Species: D. maneia

Binomial name
- Drina maneia (Hewitson, 1863)

Synonyms
- Myrina maneia Hewitson, 1863; Drina borromeorum Schröder & Treadaway, 1991

= Drina maneia =

Species of butterfly

Drina maneia is a species of butterfly belonging to the lycaenid family described by William Chapman Hewitson in 1863. It is found in the Indomalayan realm.

== Subspecies ==
- Drina maneia maneia (southern Thailand, Peninsular Malaysia, Singapore, Sumatra)
- Drina maneia borromeorum Schröder & Treadaway, 1991 (Philippines: Tawi-Tawi)
