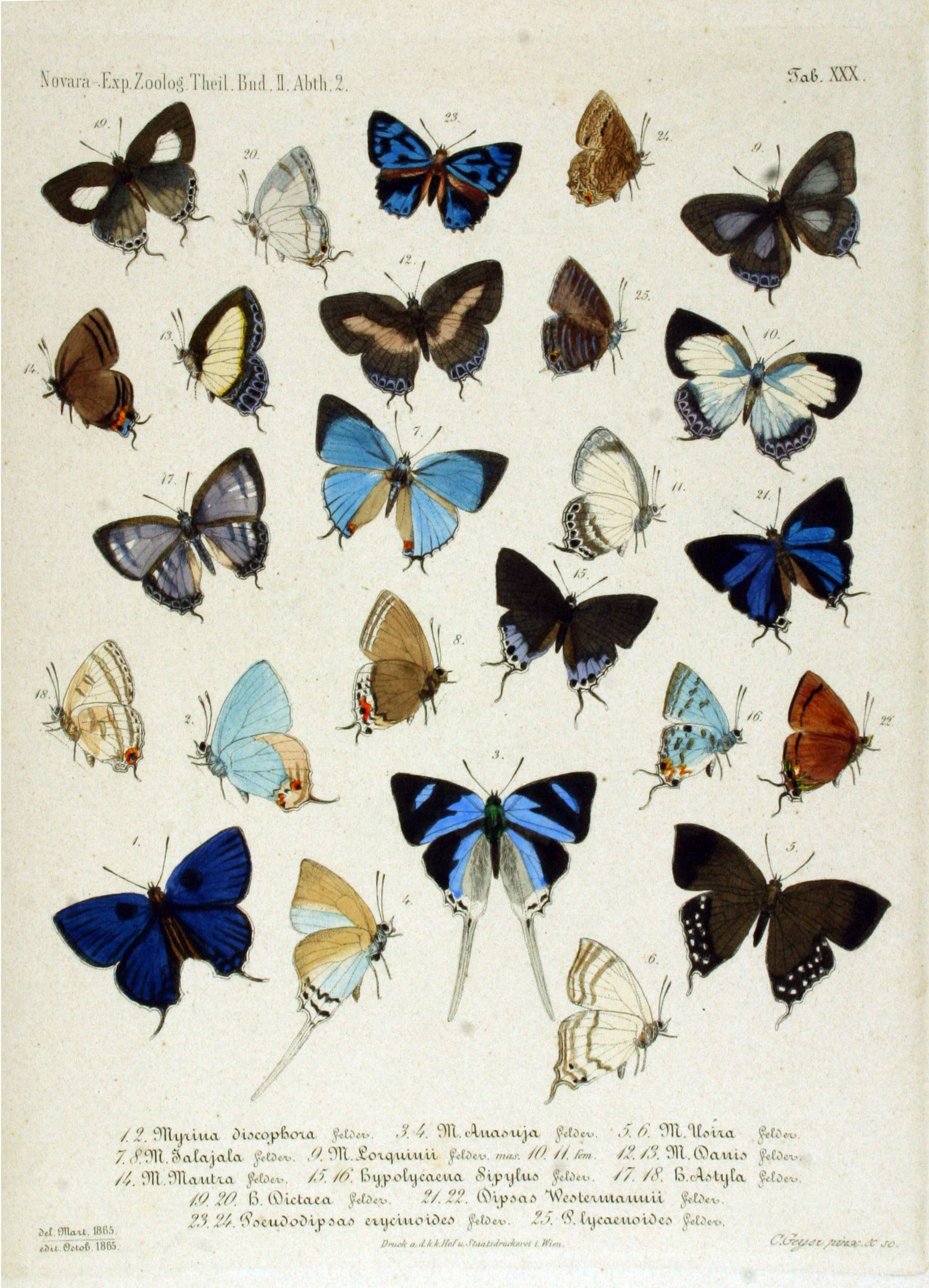
- Drina discophora and Drina donina in Cajetan Felder's Reise der Österreichischen Fregatte Novara um die Erde

Scientific classification
- Kingdom: Animalia
- Phylum: Arthropoda
- Class: Insecta
- Order: Lepidoptera
- Family: Lycaenidae
- Tribe: Loxurini
- Genus: Drina de Nicéville, 1890

= Drina (butterfly) =

Butterfly genus in family Lycaenidae

Drina is a genus of butterflies in the family Lycaenidae. The species of this genus are found in the Indomalayan realm.

== Species ==
- Drina ninoda Druce, 1895
- Drina donina (Hewitson, 1865) - brown yamfly
- Drina cowani Corbet, 1940
- Drina maneia (Hewitson, 1863)
- Drina mariae Eliot, 1969
- Drina mavortia (Hewitson, 1869)
- Drina discophora (C. & R. Felder, 1862)
