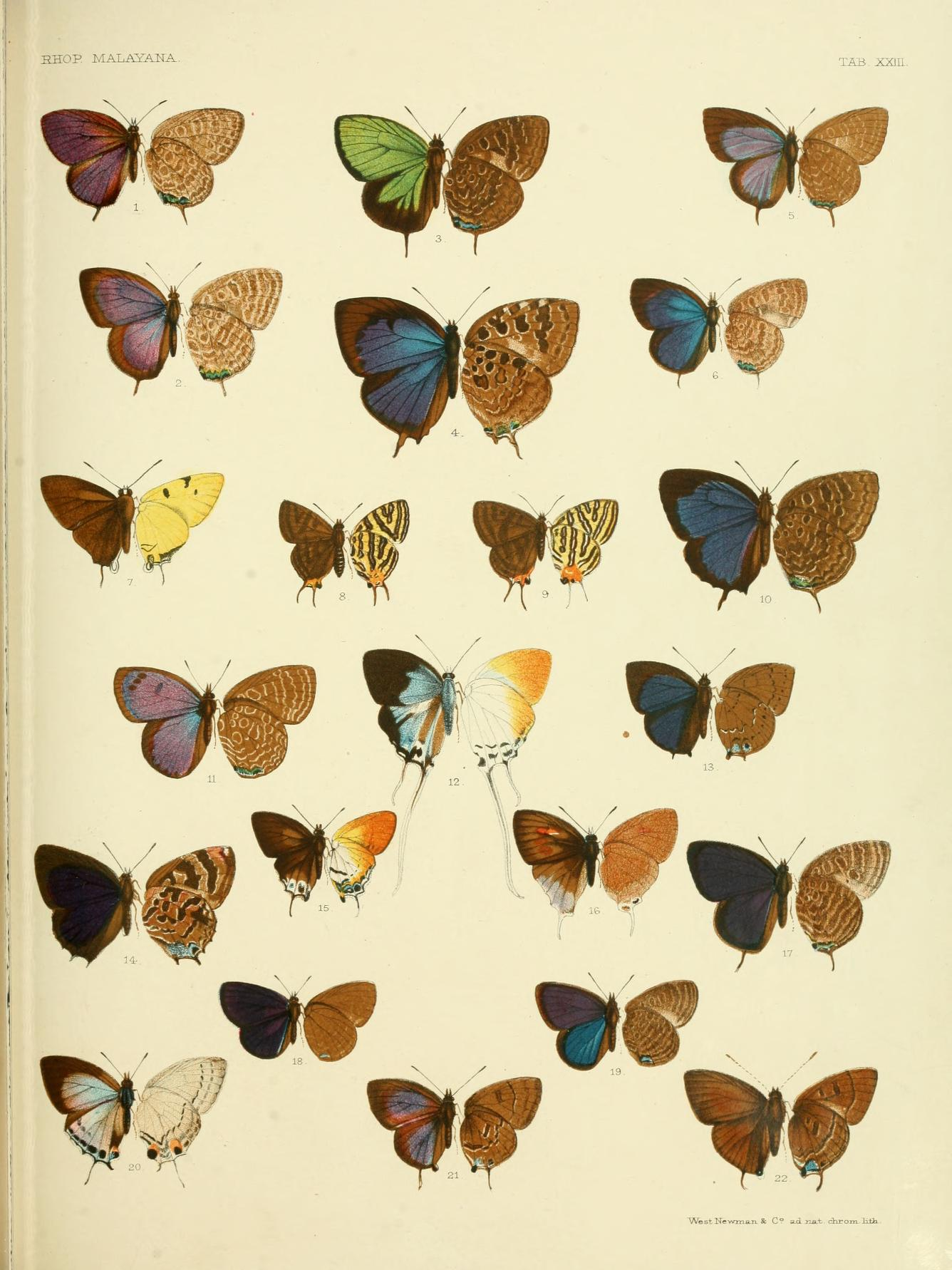
- Thamala marciana in Rhopalocera Malayana (figure 16)

Scientific classification
- Kingdom: Animalia
- Phylum: Arthropoda
- Class: Insecta
- Order: Lepidoptera
- Family: Lycaenidae
- Tribe: Loxurini
- Genus: Thamala; Moore, 1879

= Thamala =

Butterfly genus in family Lycaenidae

Thamala is an Indomalayan genus of butterflies in the family Lycaenidae.

== Species ==
- Thamala marciana (Hewitson, 1863)
- Thamala moultoni Corbet, 1942 Borneo
