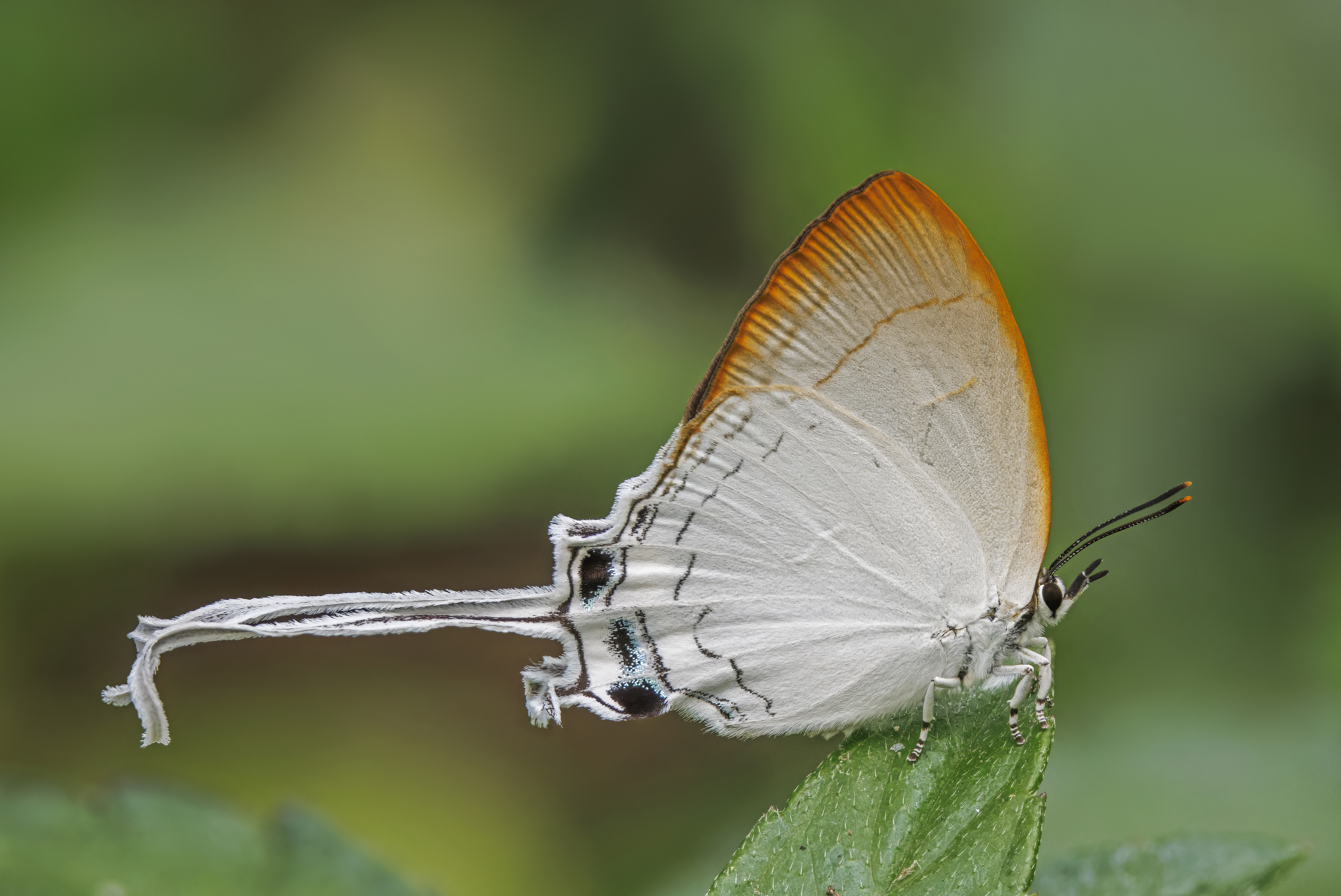
- C. freja evansi, Cambodia

Scientific classification
- Kingdom: Animalia
- Phylum: Arthropoda
- Class: Insecta
- Order: Lepidoptera
- Family: Lycaenidae
- Tribe: Cheritrini
- Genus: Cheritra; Moore, [1881]

= Cheritra =

Genus of butterflies

Cheritra is the genus of "typical" imperials, butterflies in the family Lycaenidae. The species of this genus are found in the Indomalayan realm.

== Species ==
The Global Biodiversity Information Facility includes:

1. Cheritra aenea Semper, 1890 - Philippines
2. Cheritra aenigma Cowan, 1967 - Sumatra
3. Cheritra freja (Fabricius, 1793) - type species – "common imperial";
  now considered subspecies:
  1. Cheritra jafra (Godart, 1823)
  2. Cheritra pallida (Druce, 1873)
  3. Cheritra pseudojafra Moore, 1881
4. Cheritra orpheus (Felder, 1862) - Philippines
5. Cheritra regia Evans, 1925
6. Cheritra teunga Grose-Smith
