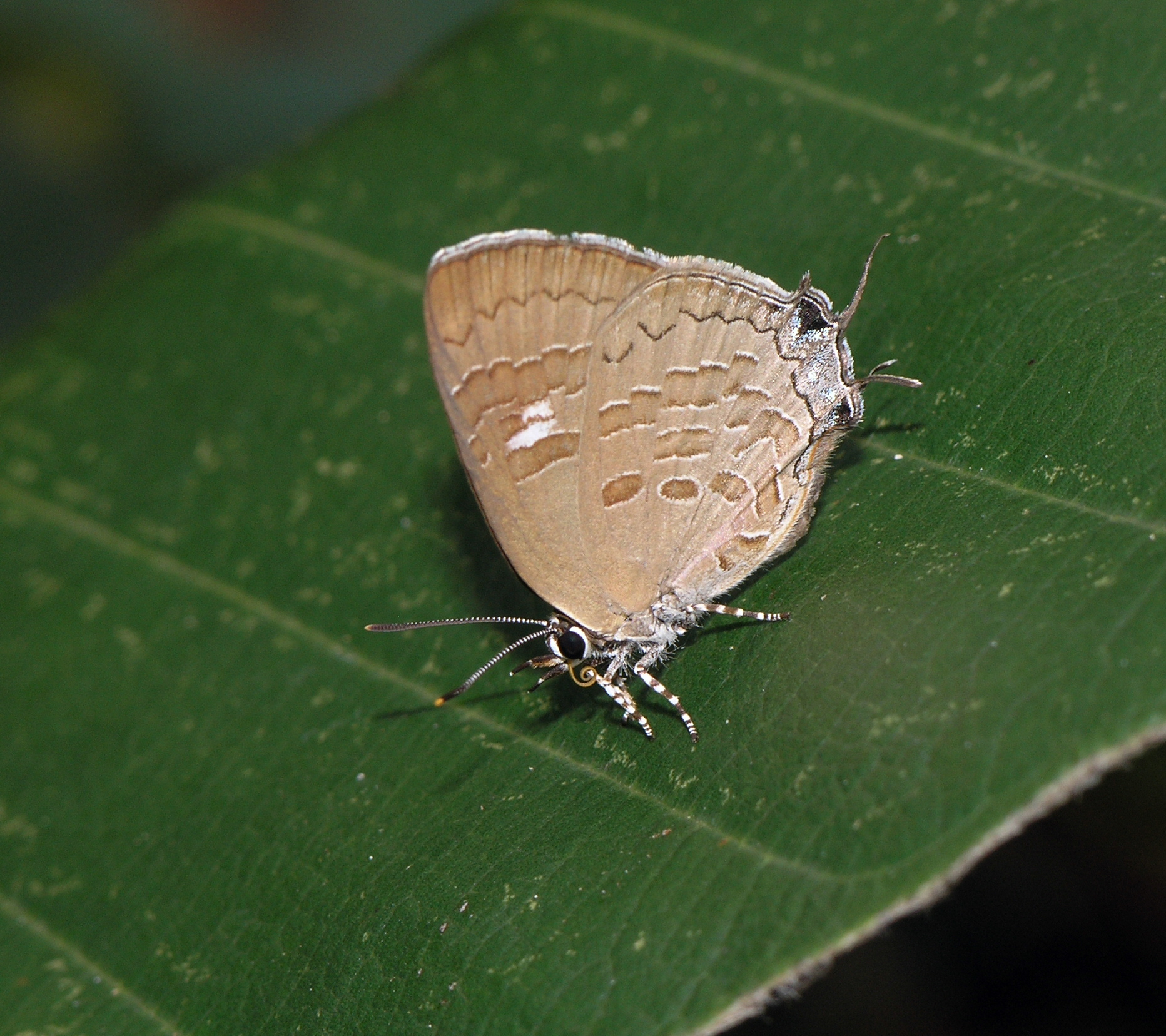

Scientific classification
- Kingdom: Animalia
- Phylum: Arthropoda
- Clade: Pancrustacea
- Class: Insecta
- Order: Lepidoptera
- Family: Lycaenidae
- Tribe: Cheritrini
- Genus: Ahmetia; Özdikmen, 2008
- Species: A. achaja

Binomial name
- Ahmetia achaja (Fruhstorfer 1912)

Synonyms
- Genus-level: Cowania Eliot, 1973 (non Reinhard, 1952: preoccupied); Species-level: Cowania achaja (Fruhstorfer 1912); Horaga achaja Fruhstorfer 1912

= Ahmetia =

Genus of butterflies

Ahmetia achaja is a species of butterfly in the family Lycaenidae. It belongs to the monotypic genus Ahmetia, formerly known as Cowania (which actually refers to a tachina fly genus). It is sometimes assigned to the tribe Horagini, but it is more probably a member of the closely related Cheritrini. It is found in Thailand and Vietnam.

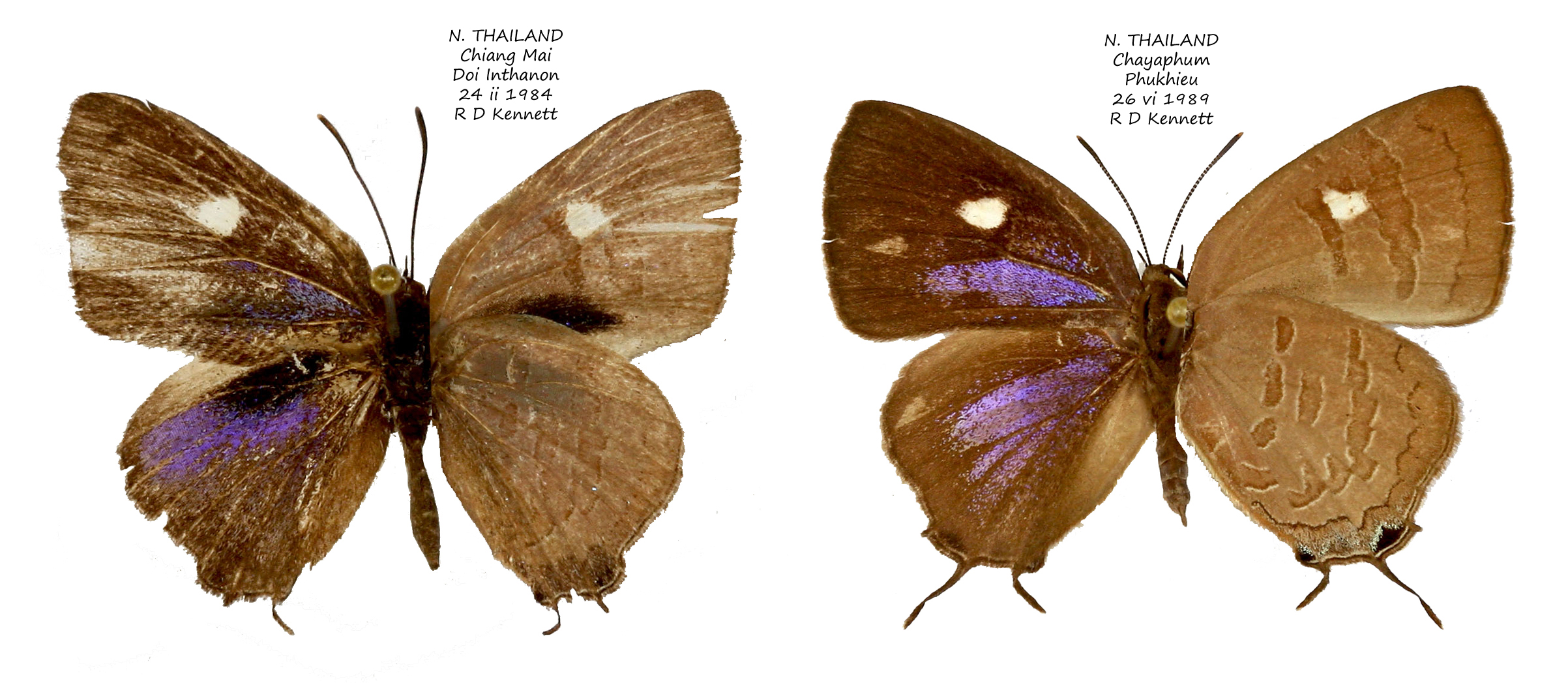
