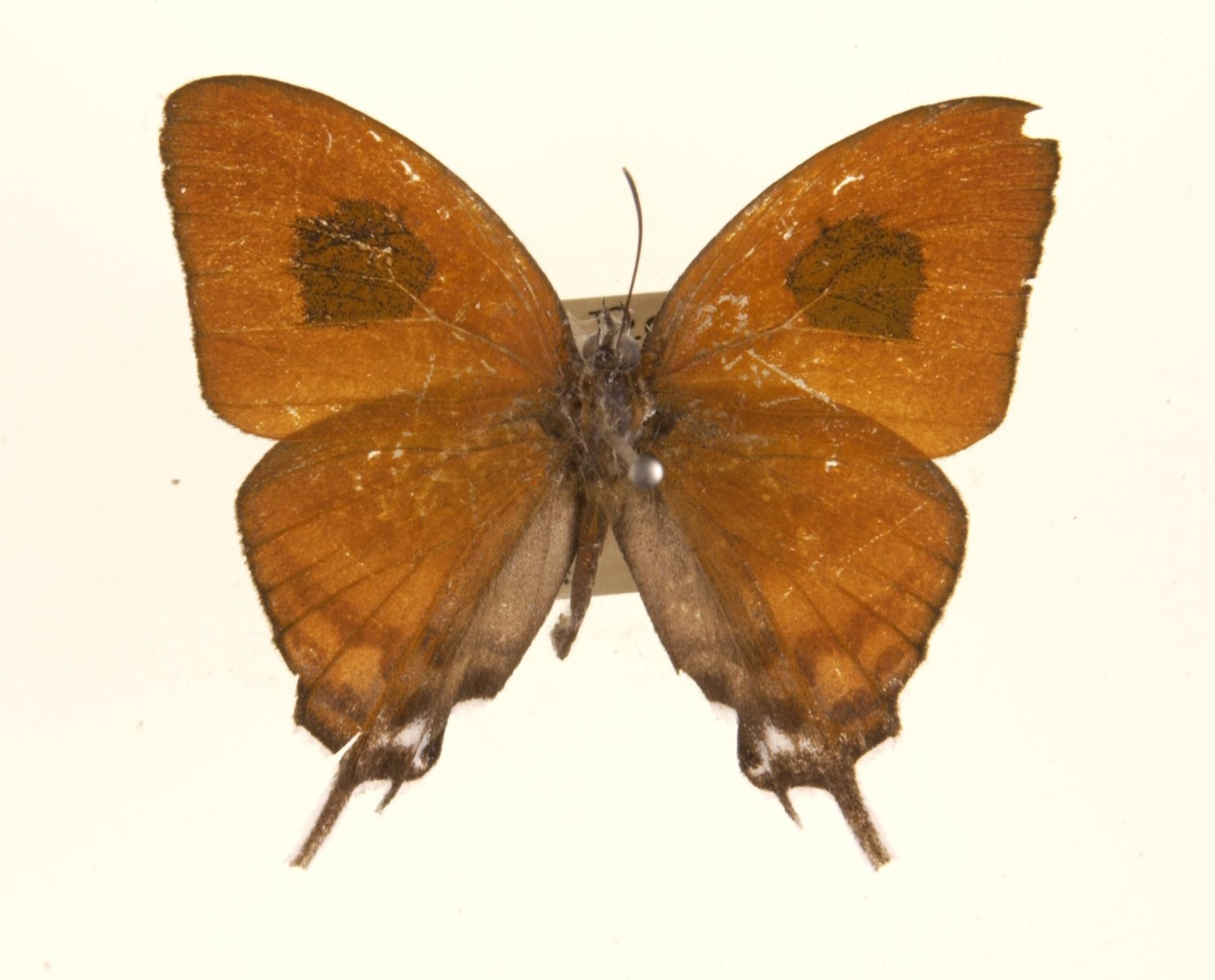
- Ritra aurea cuprea Fruhstorfer; Museum specimen from Malaya

Scientific classification
- Kingdom: Animalia
- Phylum: Arthropoda
- Clade: Pancrustacea
- Class: Insecta
- Order: Lepidoptera
- Family: Lycaenidae
- Genus: Ritra de Nicéville, 1890

= Ritra =

Butterfly genus in family Lycaenidae

Ritra is a butterfly genus in the family Lycaenidae. It is found in the Indomalayan realm .

== Species ==
- Ritra aurea (Druce, 1873)
