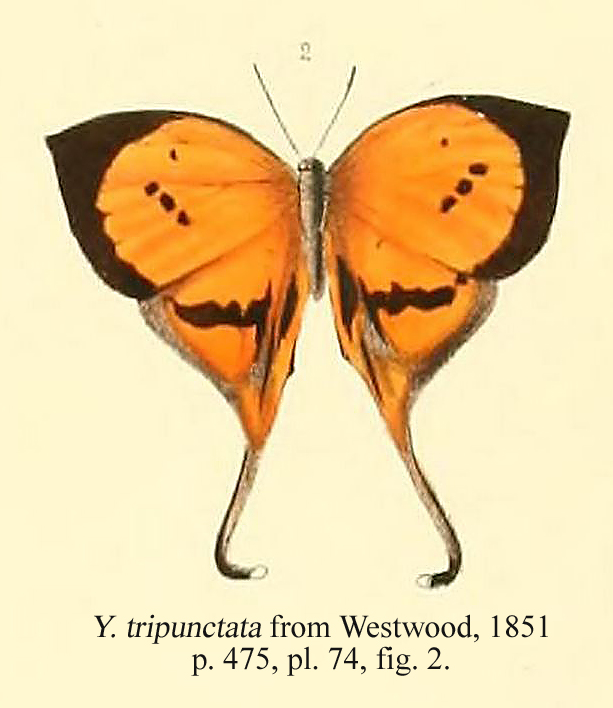
- Yasoda tripunctata

Scientific classification
- Domain: Eukaryota
- Kingdom: Animalia
- Phylum: Arthropoda
- Class: Insecta
- Order: Lepidoptera
- Family: Lycaenidae
- Genus: Yasoda; Doherty, 1889

= Yasoda (butterfly) =

Butterfly genus in family Lycaenidae

Yasoda is a genus of butterflies in the family Lycaenidae. The species in this genus are found in the Indomalayan realm.

== Species ==
- Yasoda tripunctata (Hewitson, 1863) - branded yamfly
- Yasoda pita (Horsfield, [1829])
- Yasoda androconifera Fruhstorfer, 1912
- Yasoda robinsoni Holloway, 1986
- Yasoda pitane de Nicéville, 1893
