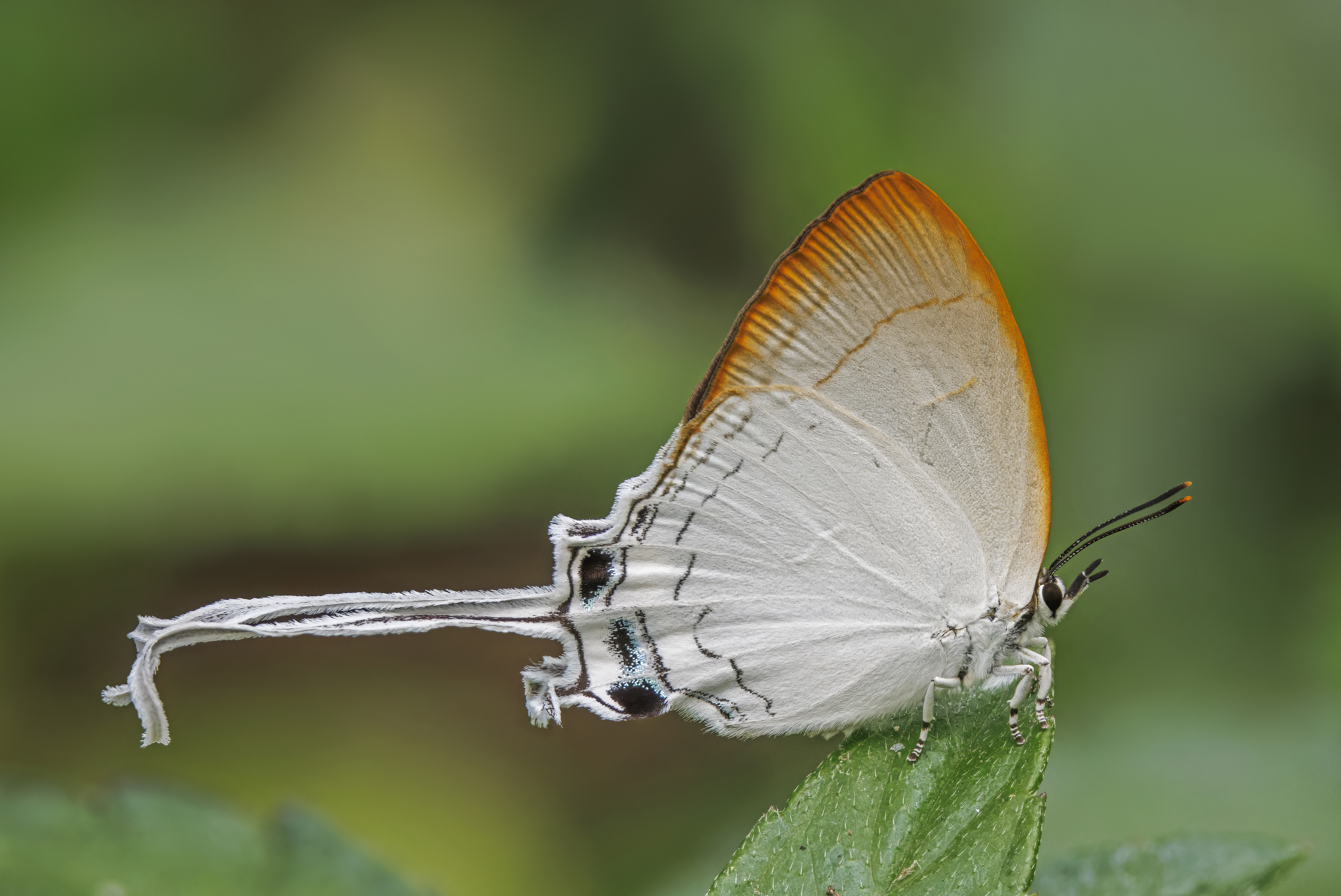
- C. f. evansi, Cambodia

Scientific classification
- Kingdom: Animalia
- Phylum: Arthropoda
- Clade: Pancrustacea
- Class: Insecta
- Order: Lepidoptera
- Family: Lycaenidae
- Genus: Cheritra
- Species: C. freja

Binomial name
- Cheritra freja (Fabricius 1793)

= Cheritra freja =

Common imperial

Species of butterfly

Cheritra freja, the common imperial, is a small butterfly found in India, Indochina, Malaysia and Sri Lanka that belongs to the gossamer-winged butterflies family (Lycaenidae).

== Subspecies ==
The subspecies of Cheritra freja are-

- Cheritra freja freja - Myanmar, Thailand
- Cheritra freja butleri Cowan, 1965 – south India
- Cheritra freja evansi Cowan, 1965 – northeast India, Myanmar, Thailand, Laos, Vietnam
- Cheritra freja fracta Cowan, 1967 – Bangka
- Cheritra freja frigga Fruhstorfer, 1912 – peninsular Malaya, Singapore, Sumatra
- Cheritra freja jafra (Godart, [1824]) – Java, Bali
- Cheritra freja pallida (Druce, 1873) – Borneo, Pulau Laut
- Cheritra freja pseudojafra Moore, [1881] – Sri Lanka
- Cheritra freja sabanga Toxopeus, 1929 – Pulau Weh

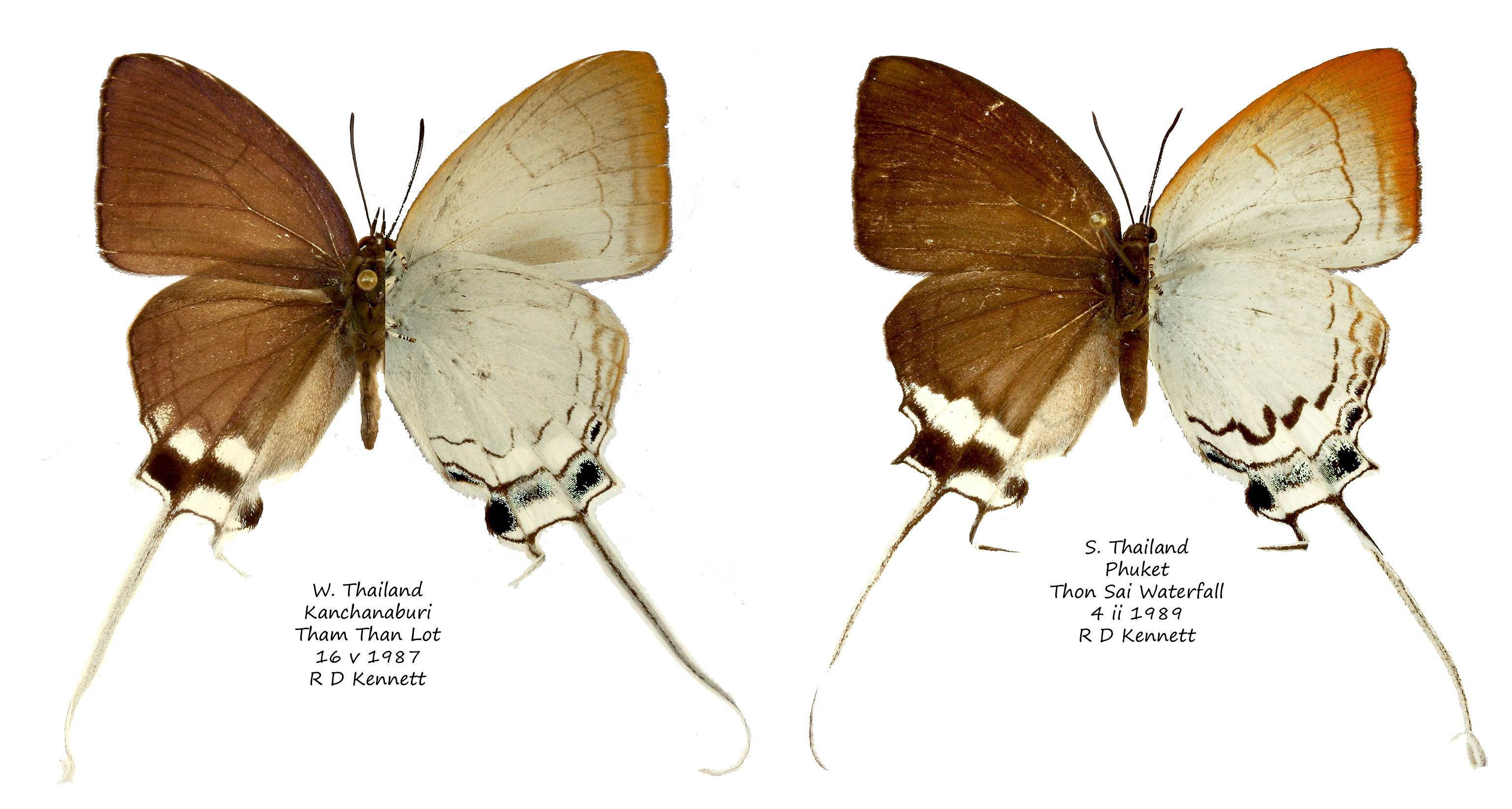
Cheritra freja freja Museum specimens Thailand

== Description ==
The butterfly has a brown upperside with white bands. The hindwings consist of a tail. It is coloured from pale yellow to white on the lower side with black margins.

Life cycle

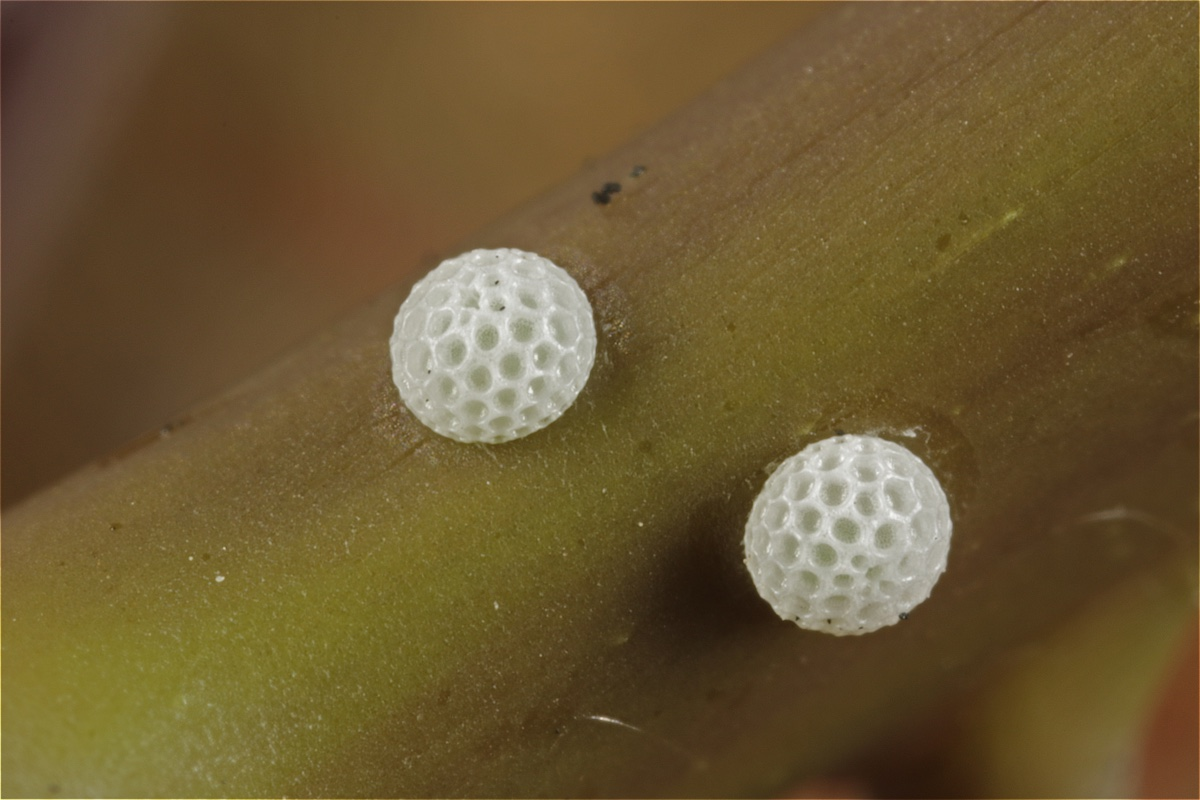
Eggs

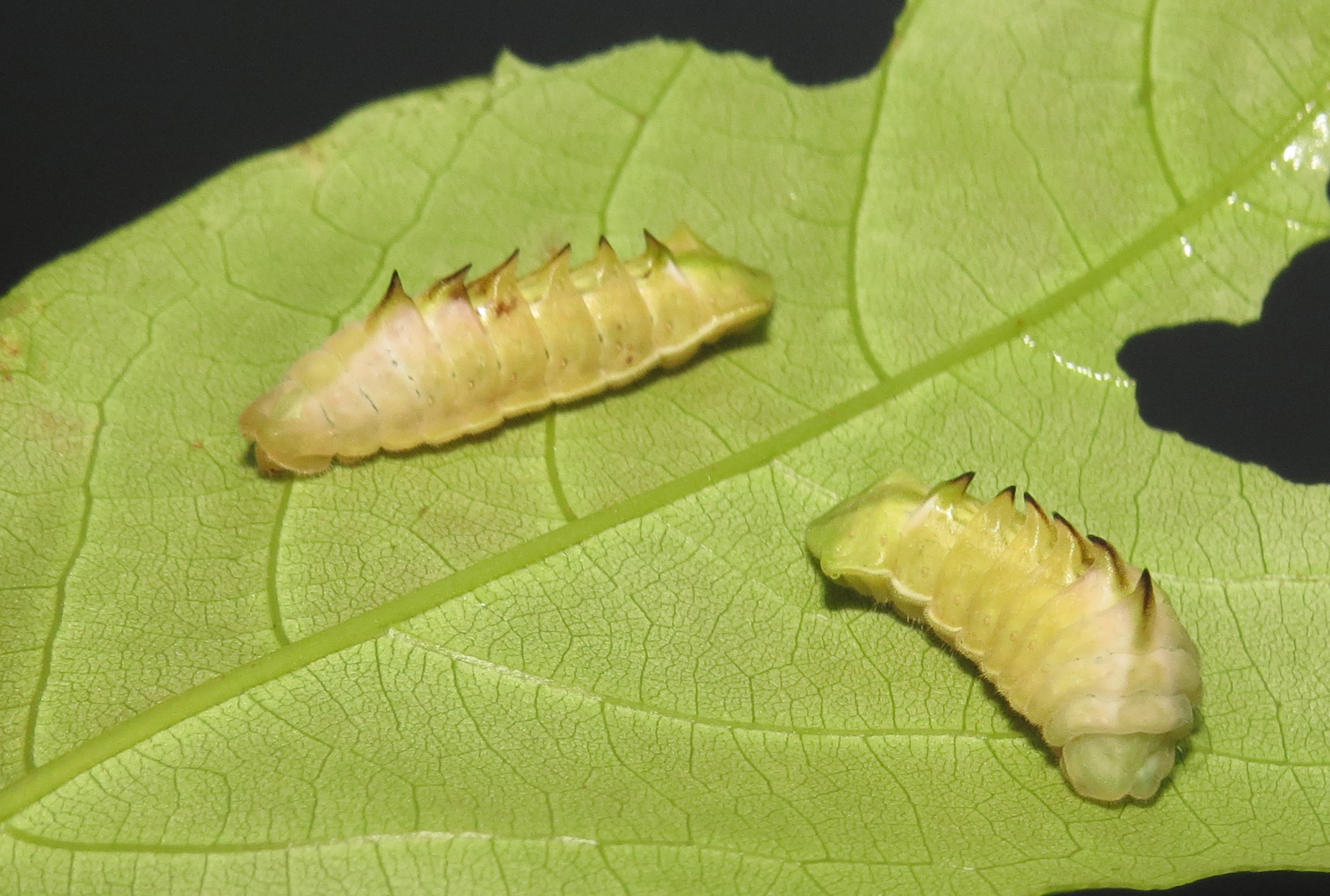
Larvae

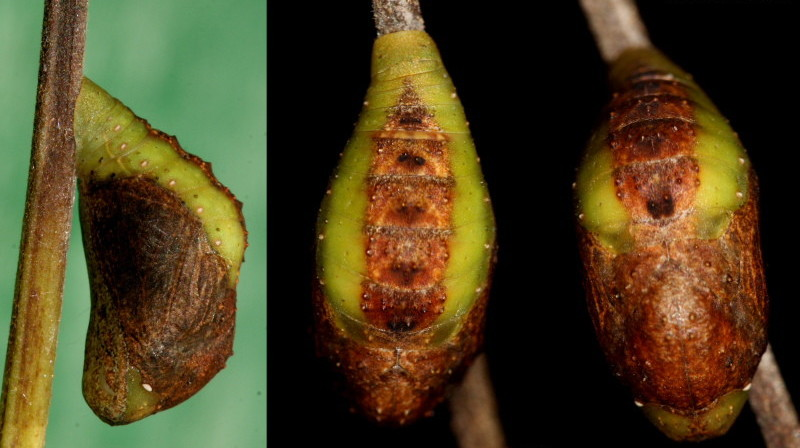
Chrysalis

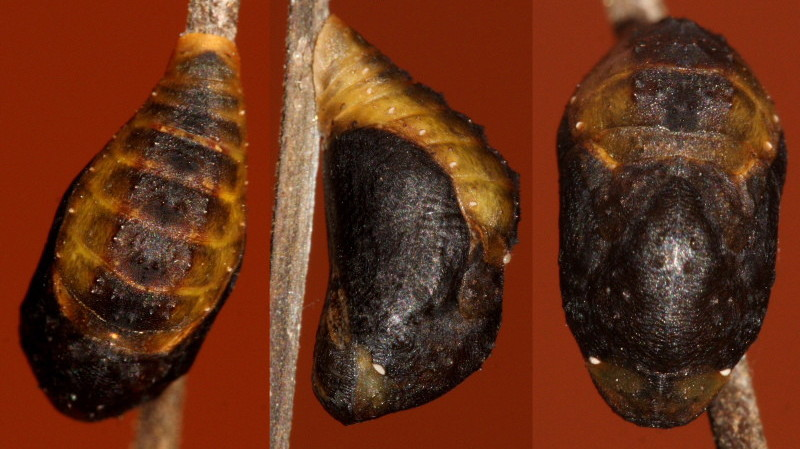
Chrysalis

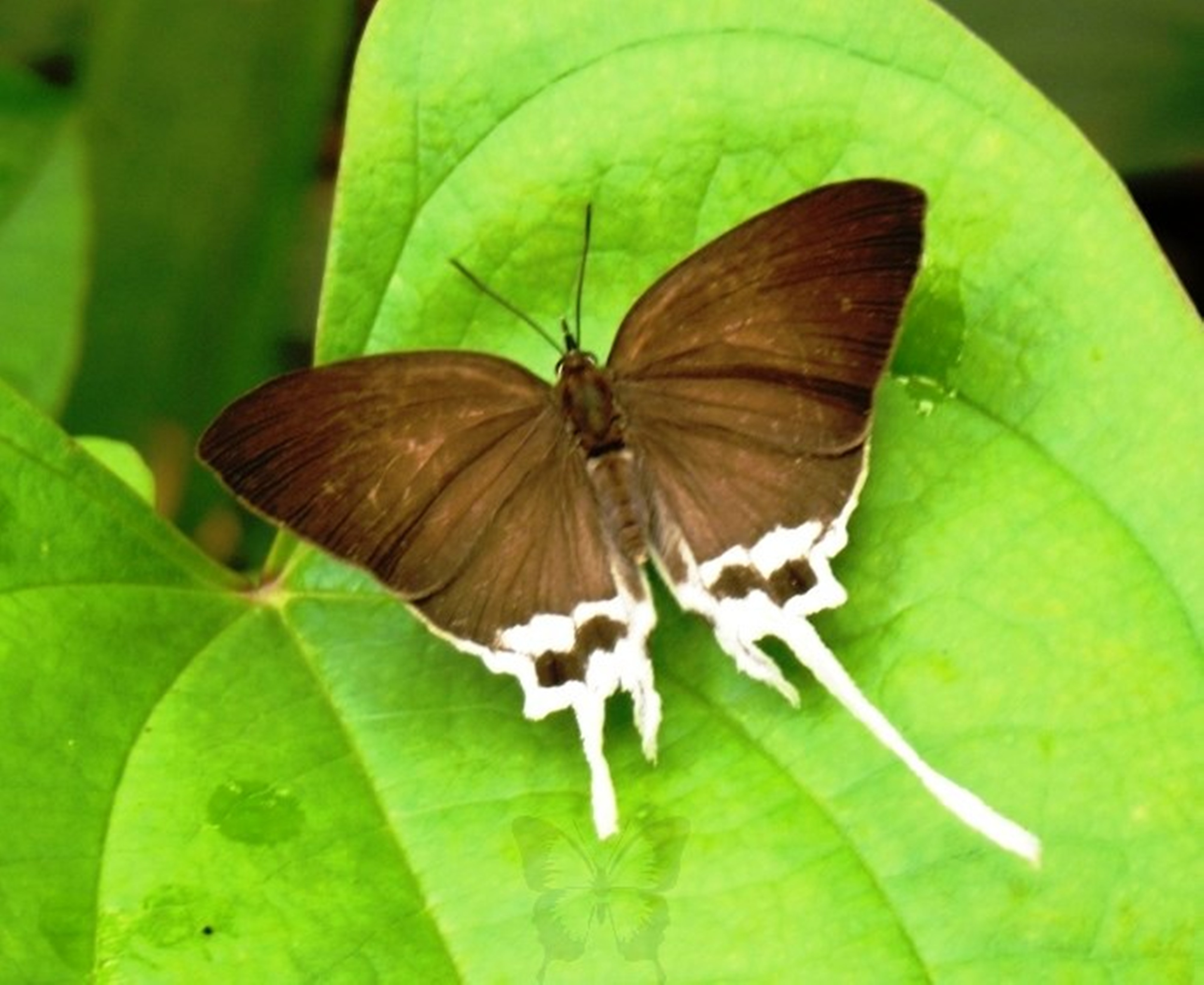
Imago (dorsal view)

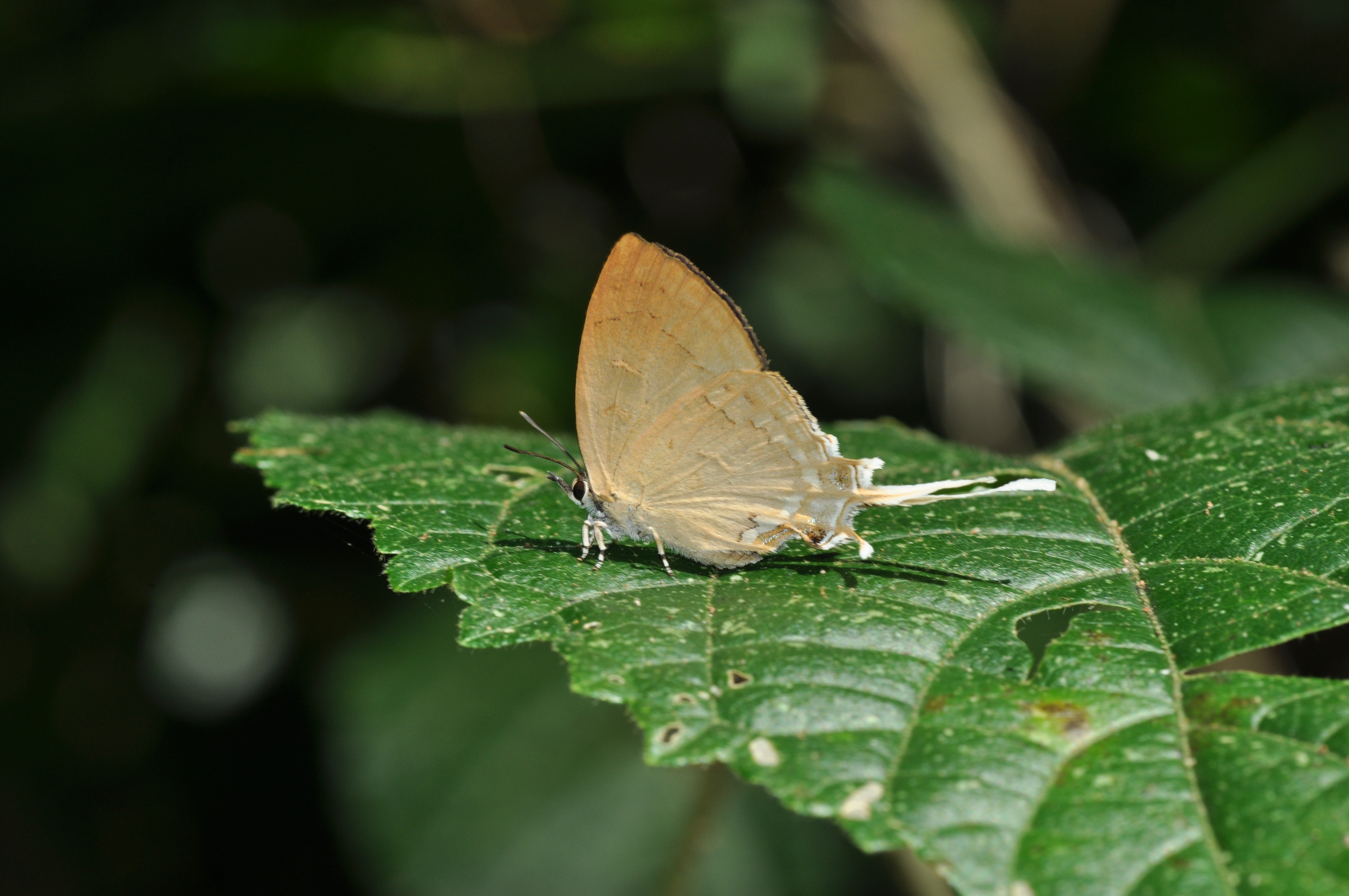
Imago (ventral view)

== See also ==
- List of butterflies of India
- List of butterflies of India (Lycaenidae)
