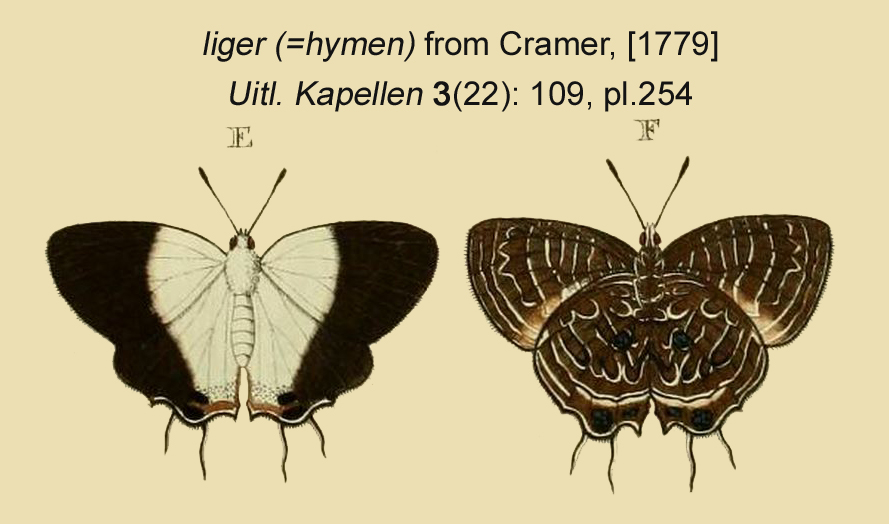

Scientific classification
- Kingdom: Animalia
- Phylum: Arthropoda
- Clade: Pancrustacea
- Class: Insecta
- Order: Lepidoptera
- Family: Lycaenidae
- Tribe: Cheritrini
- Genus: Dapidodigma; Karsch, 1895

= Dapidodigma =

Butterfly genus in family Lycaenidae

Dapidodigma is a butterfly genus in the family Lycaenidae. The two species are found in the Afrotropical realm.

== Species ==
- Dapidodigma demeter Clench, 1961
- Dapidodigma hymen (Fabricius, 1775)
