= Cowania (fly) =

Scientific classification
- Kingdom: Animalia
- Phylum: Arthropoda
- Clade: Pancrustacea
- Class: Insecta
- Order: Diptera
- Family: Tachinidae
- Subfamily: Dexiinae
- Tribe: Voriini
- Genus: Cowania; Reinhard, 1952

Type species
- Cowania wheeleri Reinhard, 1952

Genus of flies

Cowania is a genus of flies in the family Tachinidae.

== Species ==
- Cowania wheeleri Reinhard, 1952

== Distribution ==
Mexico.
