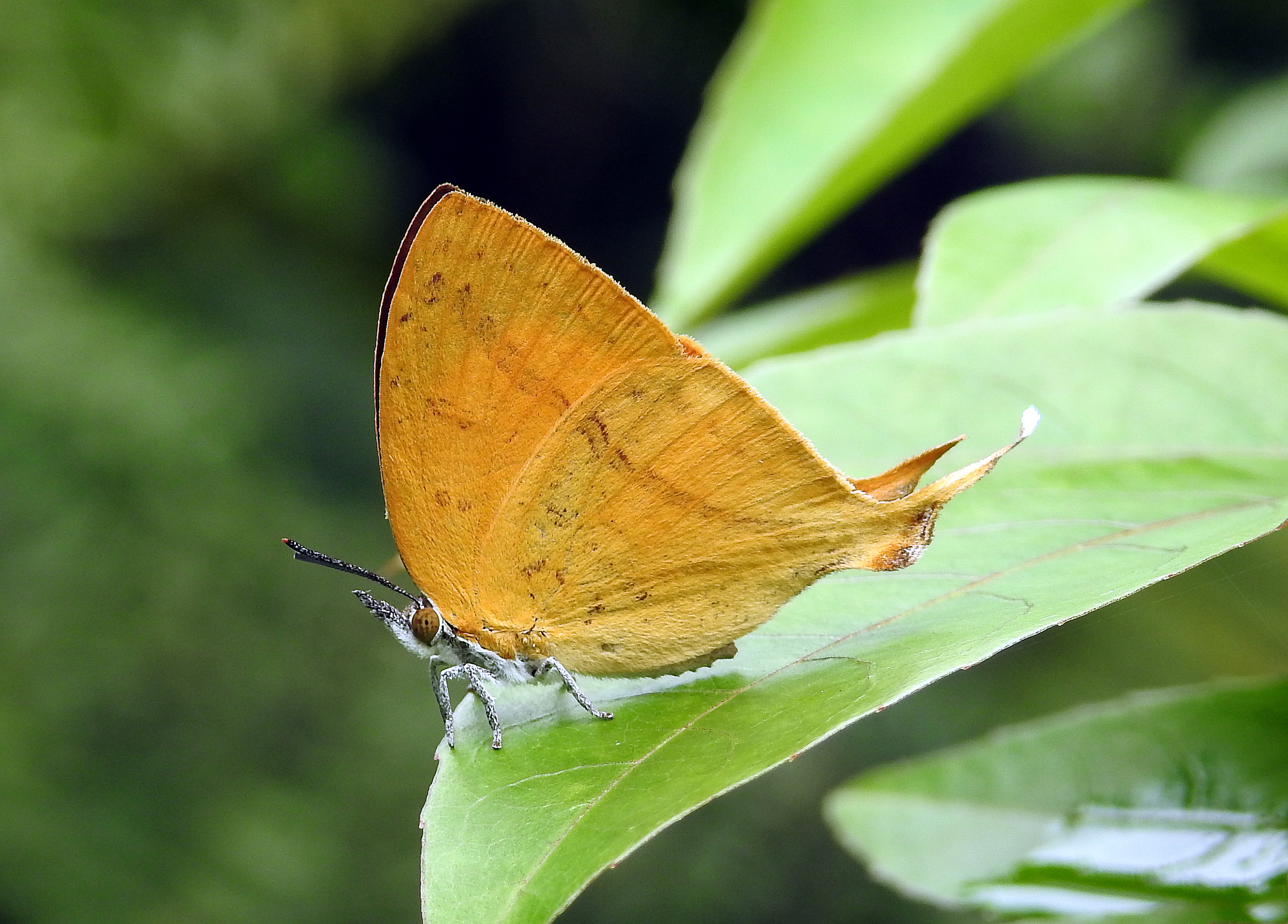

Scientific classification
- Domain: Eukaryota
- Kingdom: Animalia
- Phylum: Arthropoda
- Class: Insecta
- Order: Lepidoptera
- Family: Lycaenidae
- Genus: Loxura
- Species: L. atymnus

Binomial name
- Loxura atymnus (Cramer, 1782)

= Loxura atymnus =

Yamfly

Species of butterfly

Loxura atymnus, the yamfly, is a species of lycaenid or blue butterfly found in Asia.

== Description ==
Male. Uppersicle bright fulvous. Forewing with the apical margin from the middle of the costa increasingly black, and continued down the outer margin, gradually decreasing in width, the inner margin of the black band being in an almost continuous curve. Hindwing with a very narrow, pale ochreous-brown band on the outer margin, some suffusion of this colour being at the base of both wings and continued down the hindwing (the abdominal fold being similarly coloured) and to the end of the tail. Underside dark ochreous-yellow, markings pale blackish. Forewing with two conjoined ring-spots across the middle of the cell, and two similar spots across the end, both somewhat indistinct, the latter with, sometimes, an indistinct spot alcove it, near the costa, a discal, nearly straight band of conjoined ring-spots, the middle one double, the series ending in two black marks in the interno-median interspace, a very indistinct series of sub-marginal lunules. Hindwing with two sub-basal ring-spots, two in the cell and two at the end, all very indistinct; a discal band, slightly inwardly curved, composed as in the forewing and an indistinct submarginal series of lunules, some small brown suffusion at the anal angle and the tail brown edged. Antennae black, with white dots beneath, club with an orange tip; head and body brown above, grey beneath.

Female. Upperside somewhat paler than in the male, the marginal bands a little broader, the underside similar.

— Charles Swinhoe, Lepidoptera Indica. Vol. IX

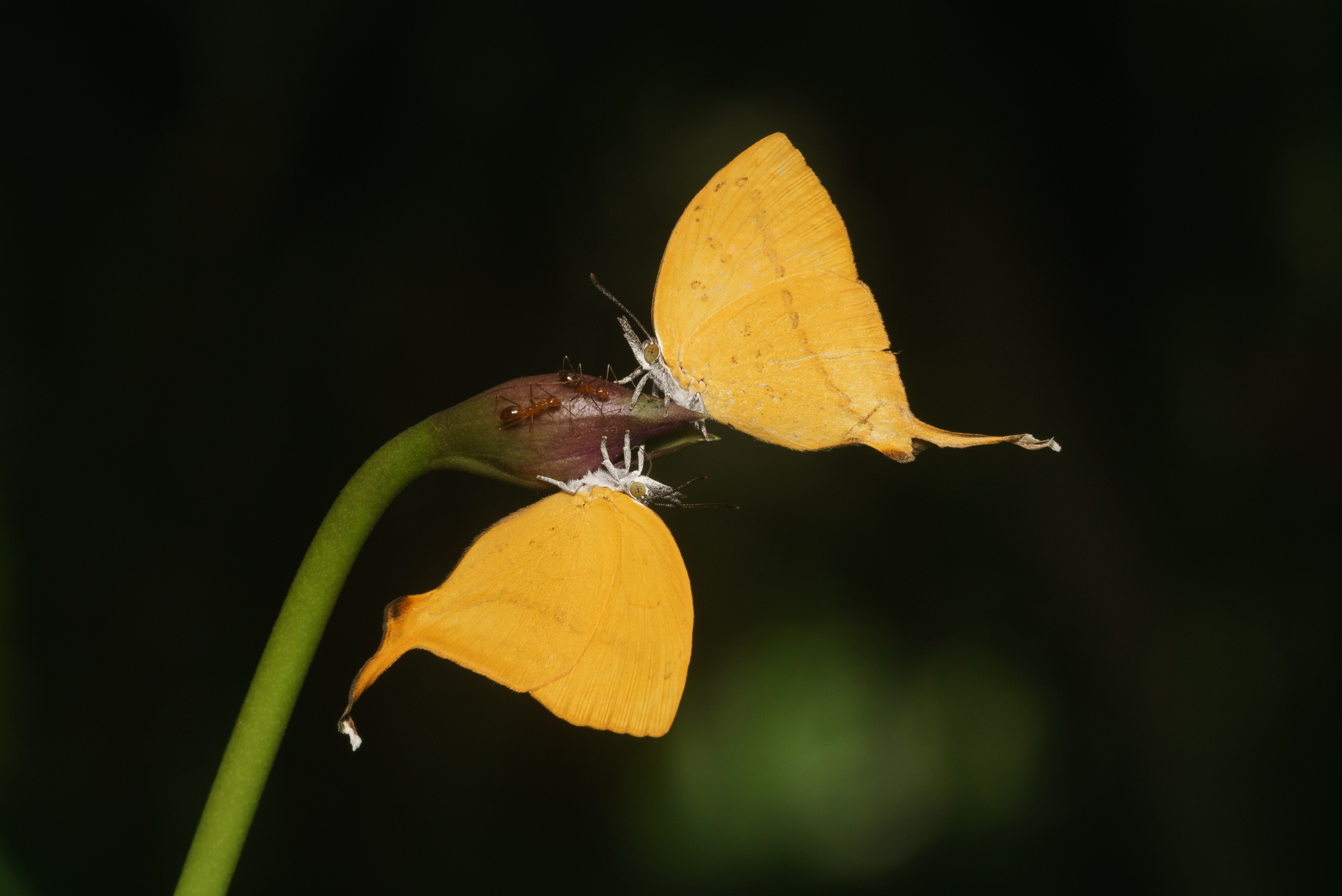
Loxura atymnus is famous for consuming nectar secreted from the extrafloral nectaries stimulated by the ants. Here they are on a Philippine orchid bud along with some yellow crazy ants.

Eggs. Dome shaped, whitish in colour. Diameter: 0.92 (± 0.09) mm.

Caterpillar.
First instar: the dorsal and dorsolateral sides of the caterpillars are greenish yellow in colour with hair like long setae present dorsally and sub-spiracularly, up to 2.98 (± 0.13) mm.
Second instar: greenish yellow with two brownish dorsal bands mid dorsally. The long setae of the first instar larvae are absent in second instar. Anal plate with a prominent depression. The anterior end possessed a crescent shaped lip like swelling with a small groove on the head. Length up to of 6.66 (± 0.34) mm.
Third instar: similar to that of second instar larvae except for greater size reaching a length of 9.7 (± 0.3) mm
Fourth instar: initially similar to that of third instar. But gradually the dorsal bands become darker and wider up to 19.62 (± 0.28) mm

Pupae:
pupae: attached to the leaf surface via its cremaster and a silk girdle to the silk pad. Size 13.61 (± 0.27) mm with a relatively long abdominal portion. Greenish with mid dorsal brown and whiteband of cryptic patterns. After about 7 days the pupae become darker in colour indicating their approach towards maturity. The pupal skin became transparent and the orange patches on the upperside of the forewings are visible through the transparent skin.

== Subspecies ==
The subspecies of Loxura atymnus are:

- Loxura atymnus atymnus Stoll, 1780 – south India
- Loxura atymnus arcuata Moore, [1881] – Sri Lanka
- Loxura atymnus continentalis Fruhstorfer, 1912 – northeast India, Indochina
- Loxura atymnus prabha Moore, 1877 – Andamans
- Loxura atymnus nicobarica Evans, 1932 – Nicobar Island
- Loxura atymnus fuconius Fruhstorfer, 1912 – Borneo, Thailand, peninsular Malaya, Langkawi, Singapore

== Life history ==
Loxura atymnus uses Smilax zeylanica (Order: Smilacaceae) and Dioscorea pentaphylla (Order: Dioscoreaceae) as host plant. Smilax zeylanica is preferred for Oviposition and eggs are laid singly at the base of young shoots. Before hatching parts of the egg shell are consumed. Just after their emergence from the egg shells the hatchlings (1.23 ± 0.11 mm) consumed the remaining part of the egg shell, then they start feeding leaves. The first three instars take 2–3 days. The fourth instar stops feeding after four days and attaches itself with a silk girdle and builds the pupal case. 15 to 16 days after hatching from eggs the pupation takes place. The adult butterflies emerged from the pupae after 7.7 (±0.27) days. The total life cycles were completed in 23–26 days in laboratory conditions and may be change with temperature changes. This short duration of life cycle enables the butterfly species to complete several life cycles within a year.

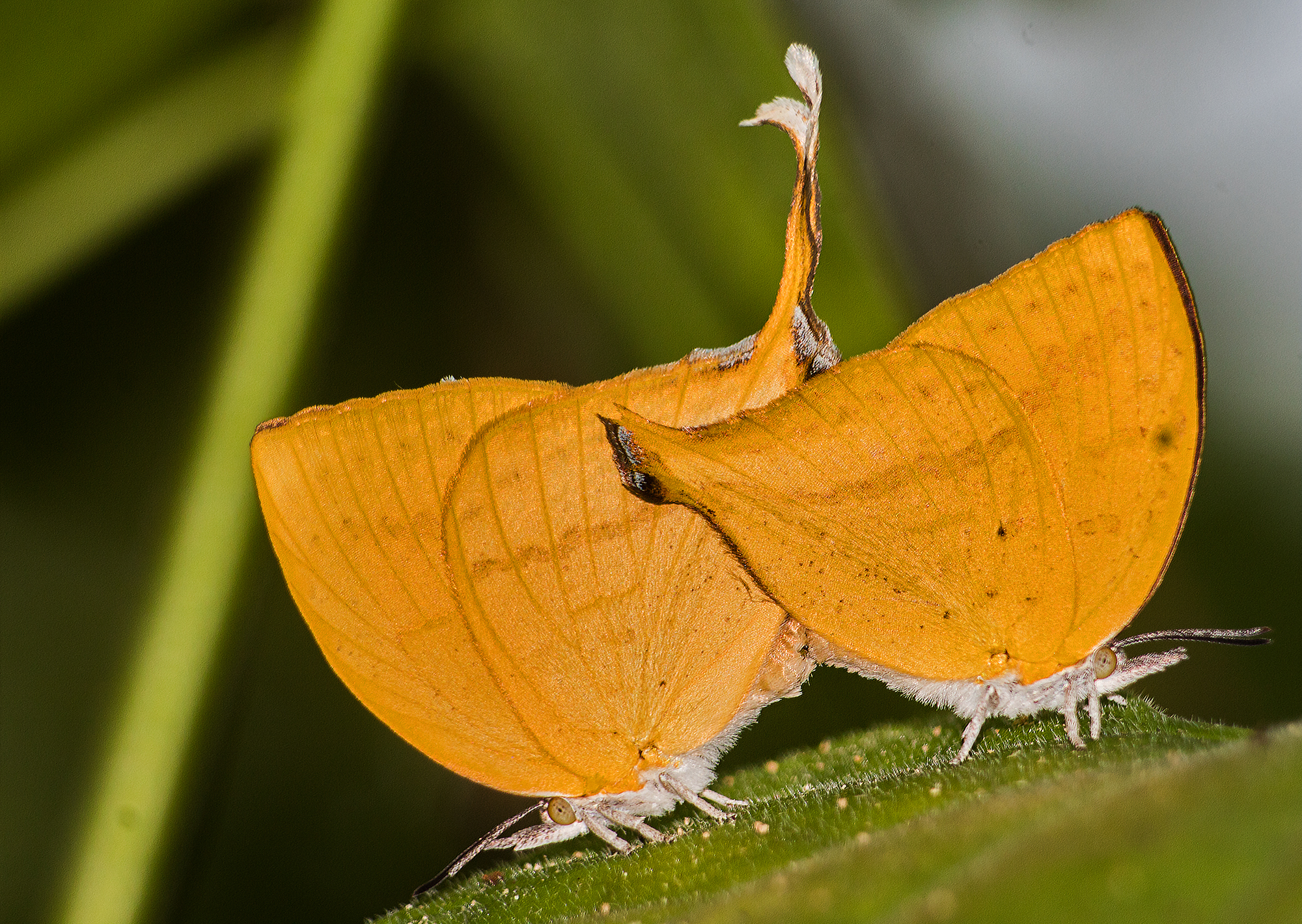
Mating pair

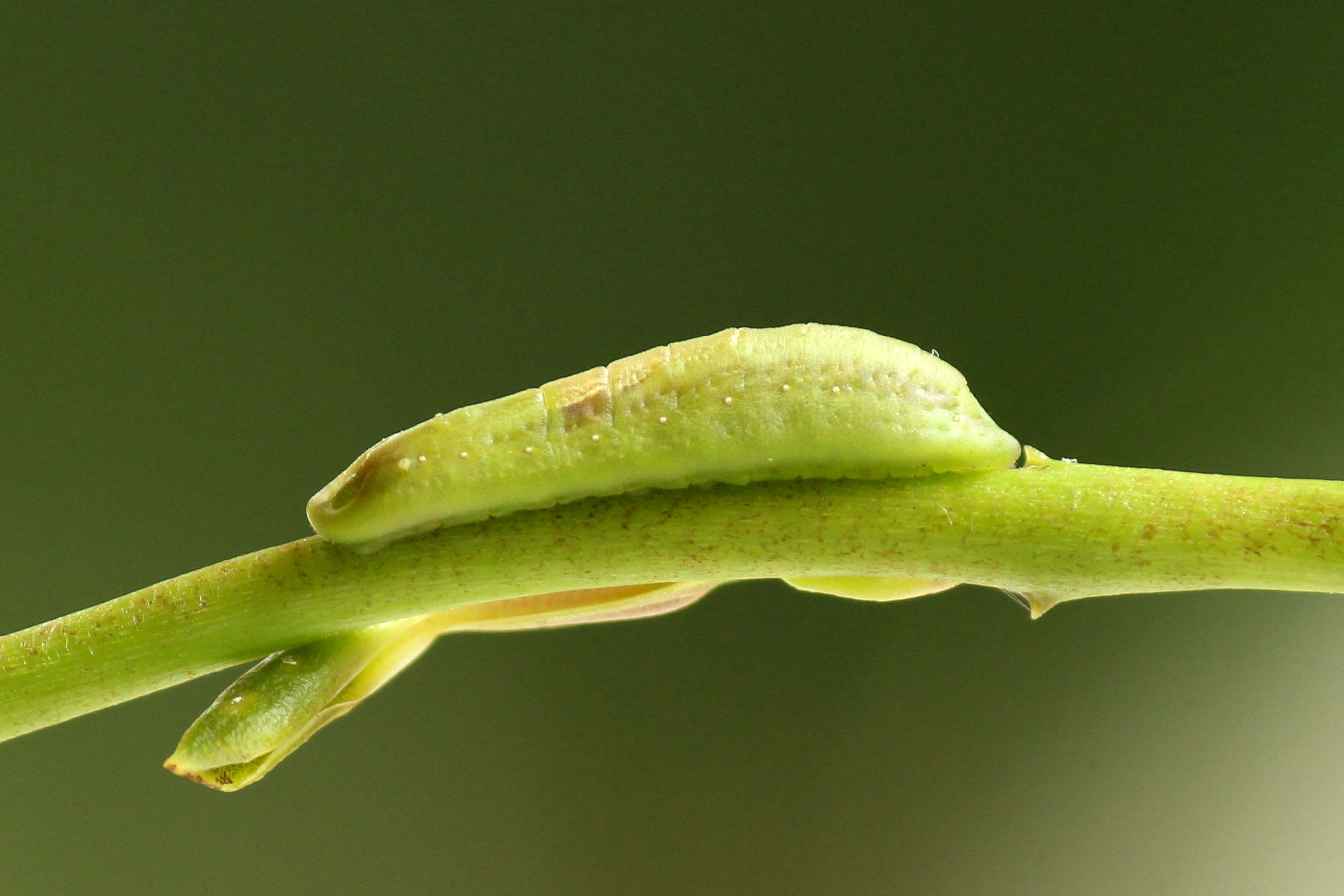
Larva

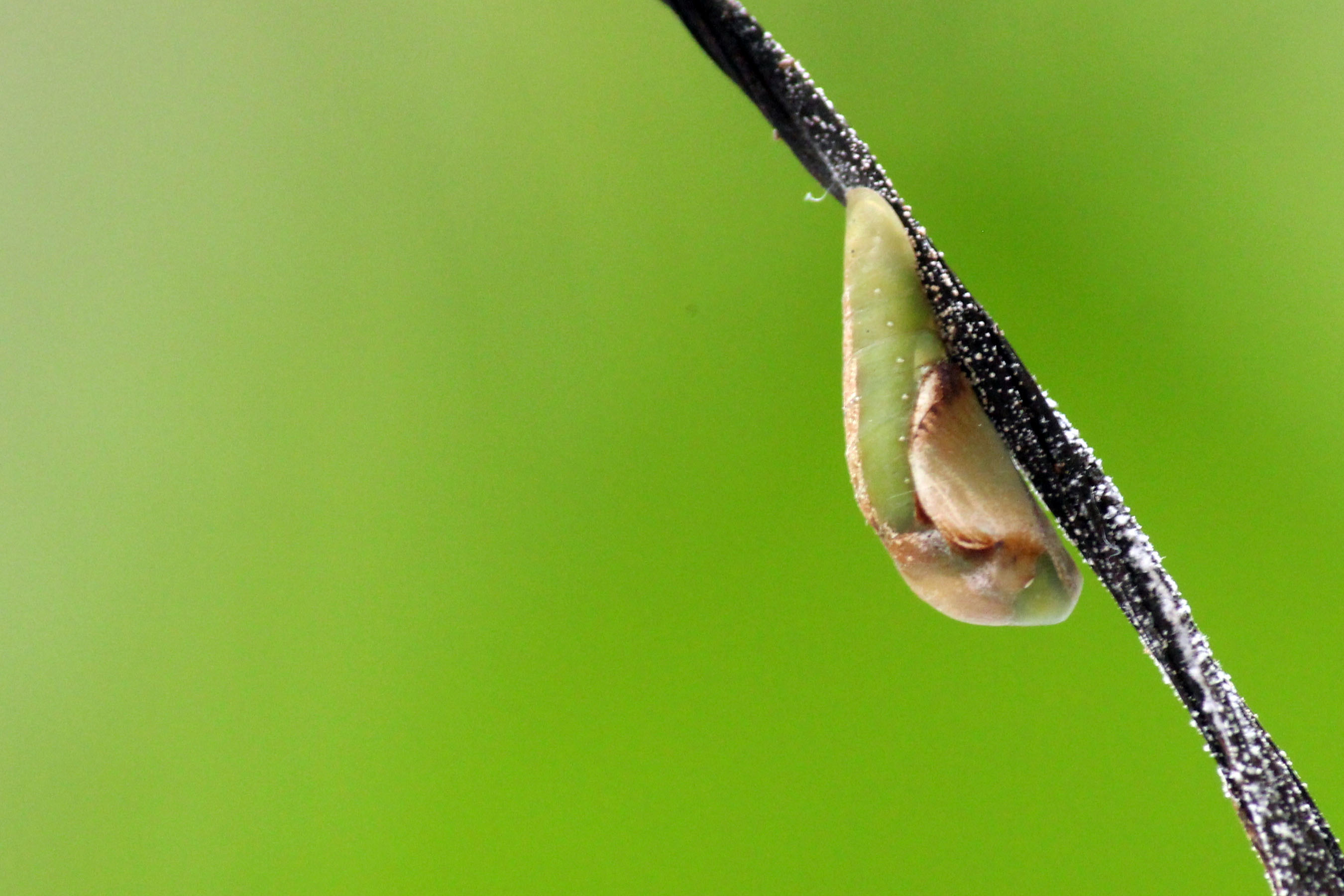
Pupa

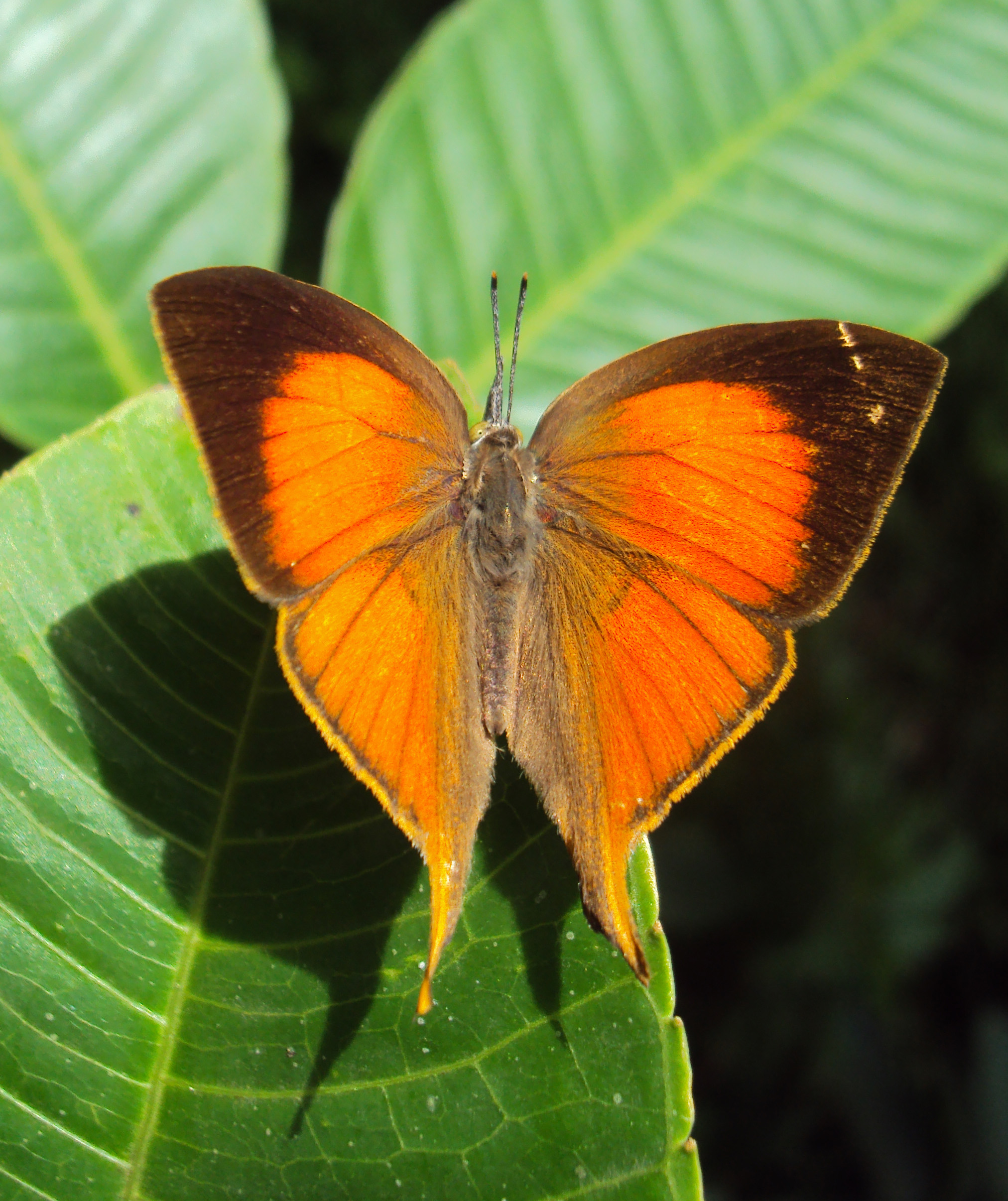
Dorsal view

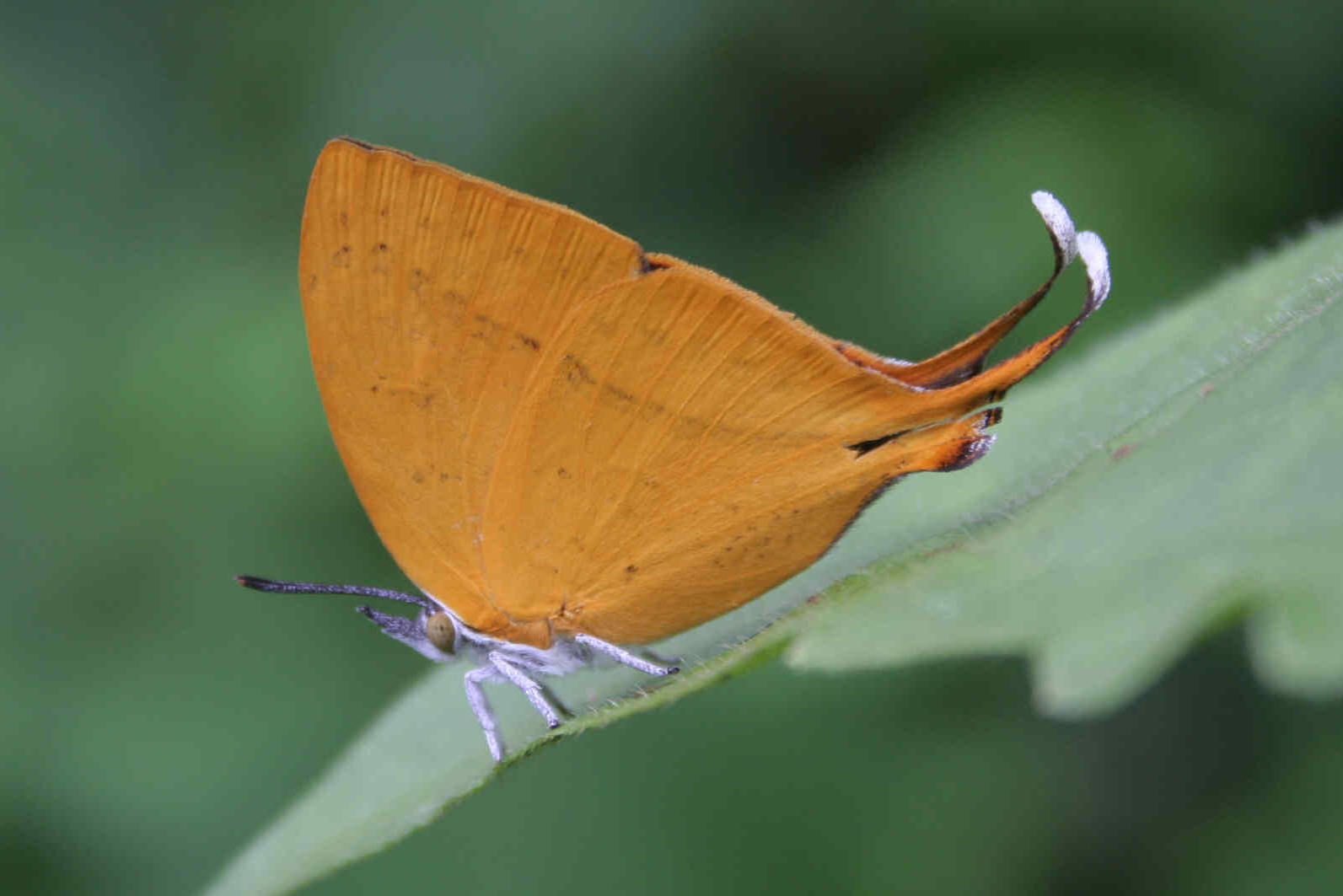
Ventral view

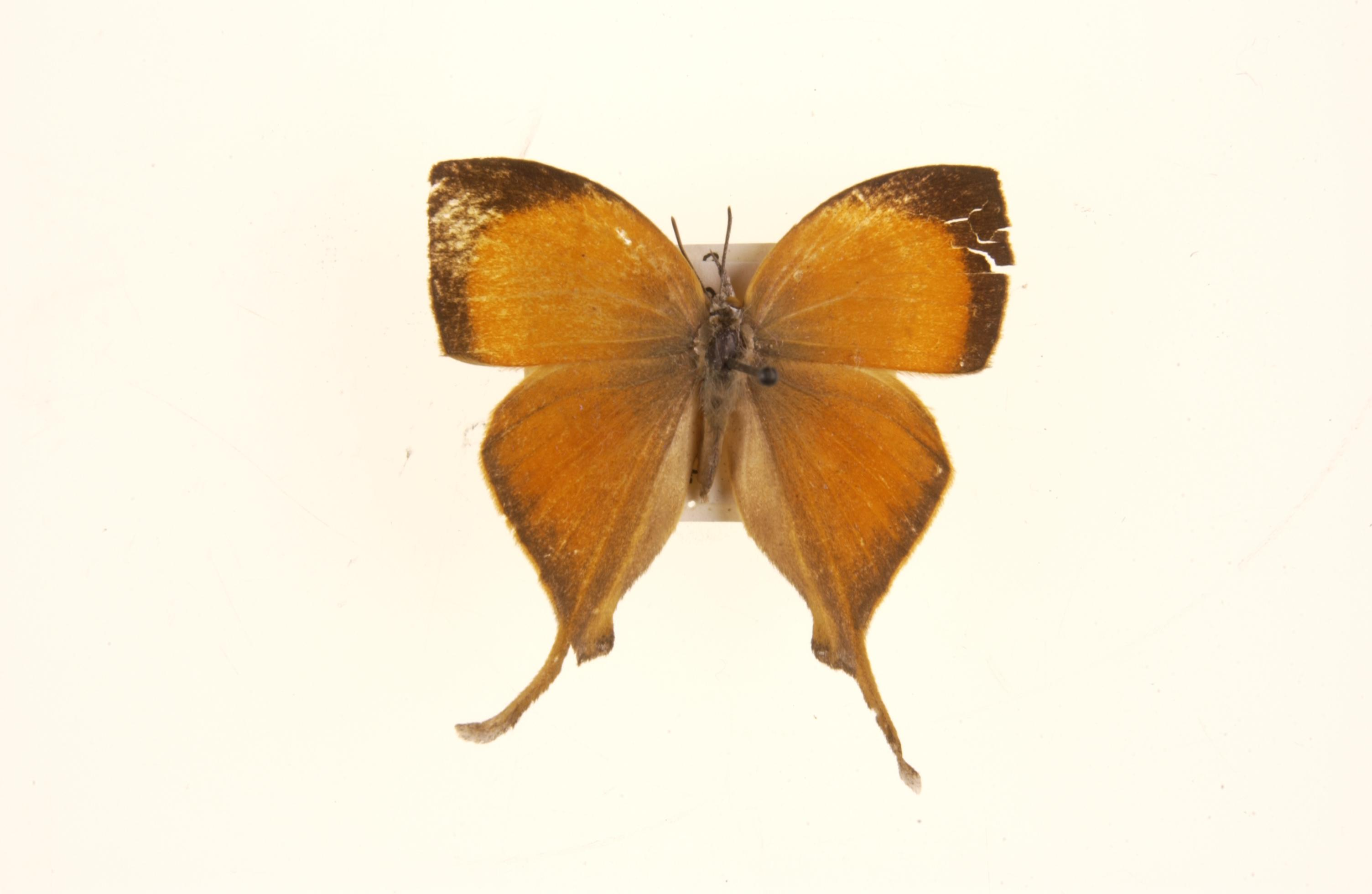
Specimen from Malaya
