= List of lycaenid genera: H =

The large butterfly family Lycaenidae contains the following genera starting with the letter H:

- Habrodais
- Harpendyreus
- Heliophorus
- Hemiargus
- Hemiolaus
- Heoda
- Hewitsonia
- Horaga
- Howarthia
- Hypaurotis
- Hypochlorosis
- Hypochrysops
- Hypolycaena
- Hypomyrina
- Hypophytala
- Hypostrymon
- Hypothecla
- Hyrcanana
