= Hypotheclini =

Scientific classification
- Kingdom: Animalia
- Phylum: Arthropoda
- Clade: Pancrustacea
- Class: Insecta
- Order: Lepidoptera
- Family: Lycaenidae
- Subfamily: Theclinae
- Tribe: Hypotheclini; Eliot, 1973

Genera
- See text

Tribe of butterflies

The Hypotheclini are a small tribe of butterflies in the family Lycaenidae.

== Genera ==
The tribe contains a mere 2 genera at present, but as not all Theclinae have been assigned to tribes, the following list is preliminary:

- Hypochlorosis
- Hypothecla
