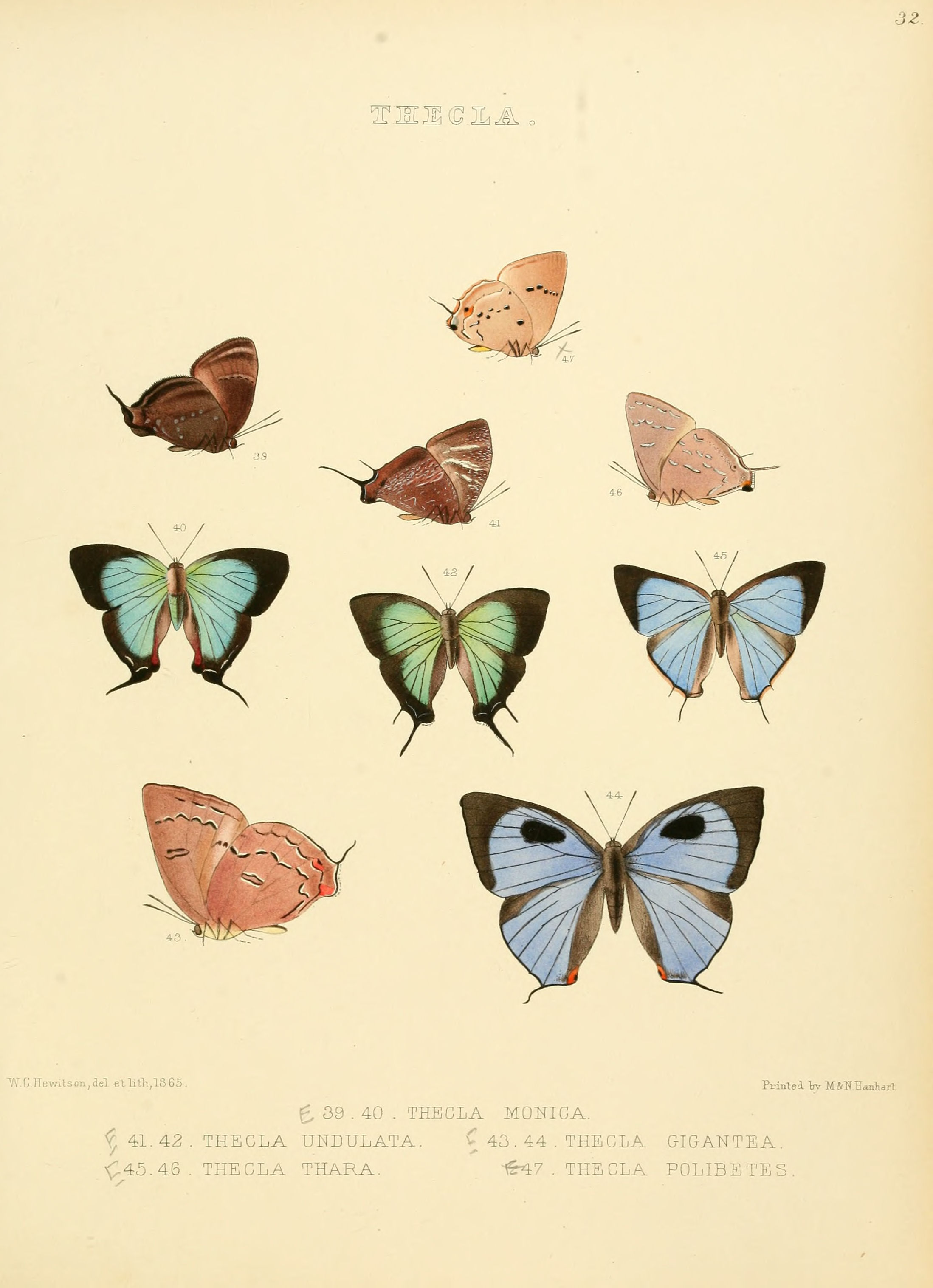
- Megathecla gigantea depicted in William Chapman Hewitson's Illustrations of diurnal Lepidoptera

Scientific classification
- Kingdom: Animalia
- Phylum: Arthropoda
- Class: Insecta
- Order: Lepidoptera
- Family: Lycaenidae
- Tribe: Eumaeini
- Genus: Megathecla; Robbins, 2002

Synonyms
- Cupathecla Bálint, 2006; Gullicaena Bálint, 2002; Gulliveria D'Abrera & Bálint, 2001 (may be nomen nudum; non Castelnau, 1878: preoccupied)

= Megathecla =

Butterfly genus in family Lycaenidae

Megathecla is a gossamer-winged butterfly genus of tribe Eumaeini in the subfamily Theclinae. These butterflies are found in the Neotropical realm. The distinctness of this genus was only recognized after the year 2000, even though the type species M. gigantea has been scientifically known since the late 19th century.

It contains three species at present, but undescribed ones are likely to exist:

- Megathecla corentini Faynel, 2009
- Megathecla cupentus (Stoll, [1781]) (sometimes in Cupathecla)
- Megathecla gigantea (Hewitson, 1867)

The initial name proposed for this lineage was Gulliveria, but some authors do not consider it validly published. In any case, this name was already established for a supposed genus of cardinalfishes earlier and thus cannot be used for the butterflies.

As replacement for "Gulliveria", one of the original authors proposed Gullicaena. But another entomologist had already established Megathecla for exactly the same purpose some months earlier, and this name is thus used today. If, however, "Gulliveria" was never validly published, Megathecla must be formally acknowledged by the ICZN.

M. cupentus – a species described in 1781 – is sometimes separated in a monotypic genus Cupathecla, but considering that the relationships of these species are by no means fully resolved, it seems premature to recognize it.
