= Nivalis =

Nivalis (lat. 'snowy'/'of the snow'/'snow-like', from nix, nivis "snow") may refer to:

- A fictional city in the game Cloudpunk
- A proposed but rejected synonym for the Madeleinea butterfly

== See also ==
- List of Latin and Greek words commonly used in systematic names
