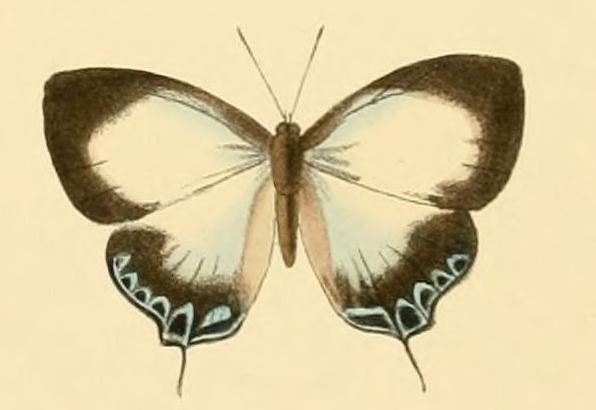

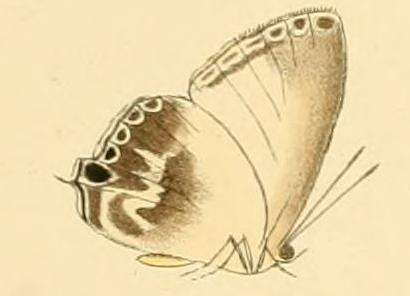

Scientific classification
- Domain: Eukaryota
- Kingdom: Animalia
- Phylum: Arthropoda
- Class: Insecta
- Order: Lepidoptera
- Family: Lycaenidae
- Genus: Hypochlorosis
- Species: H. antipha

Binomial name
- Hypochlorosis antipha (Hewitson, 1869)

Synonyms
- Myrina antipha Hewitson, 1869; Pseudonotis metilia Fruhstorfer, 1908; Hypochlorosis lorquinii metilia

= Hypochlorosis antipha =

Species of butterfly

Hypochlorosis antipha is a butterfly in the family Lycaenidae. It is found on Maluku, Indonesia and Fergusson Island, Papua New Guinea.

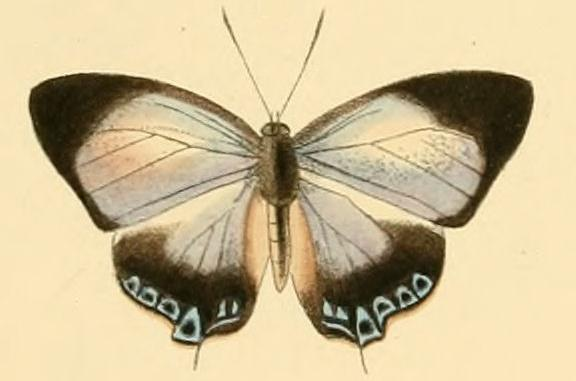

== Subspecies ==
- Hypochlorosis antipha antipha (Maluku, Aru Islands)
- Hypochlorosis antipha metilia (Fruhstorfer, 1908) (New Guinea: Fergusson Island)
