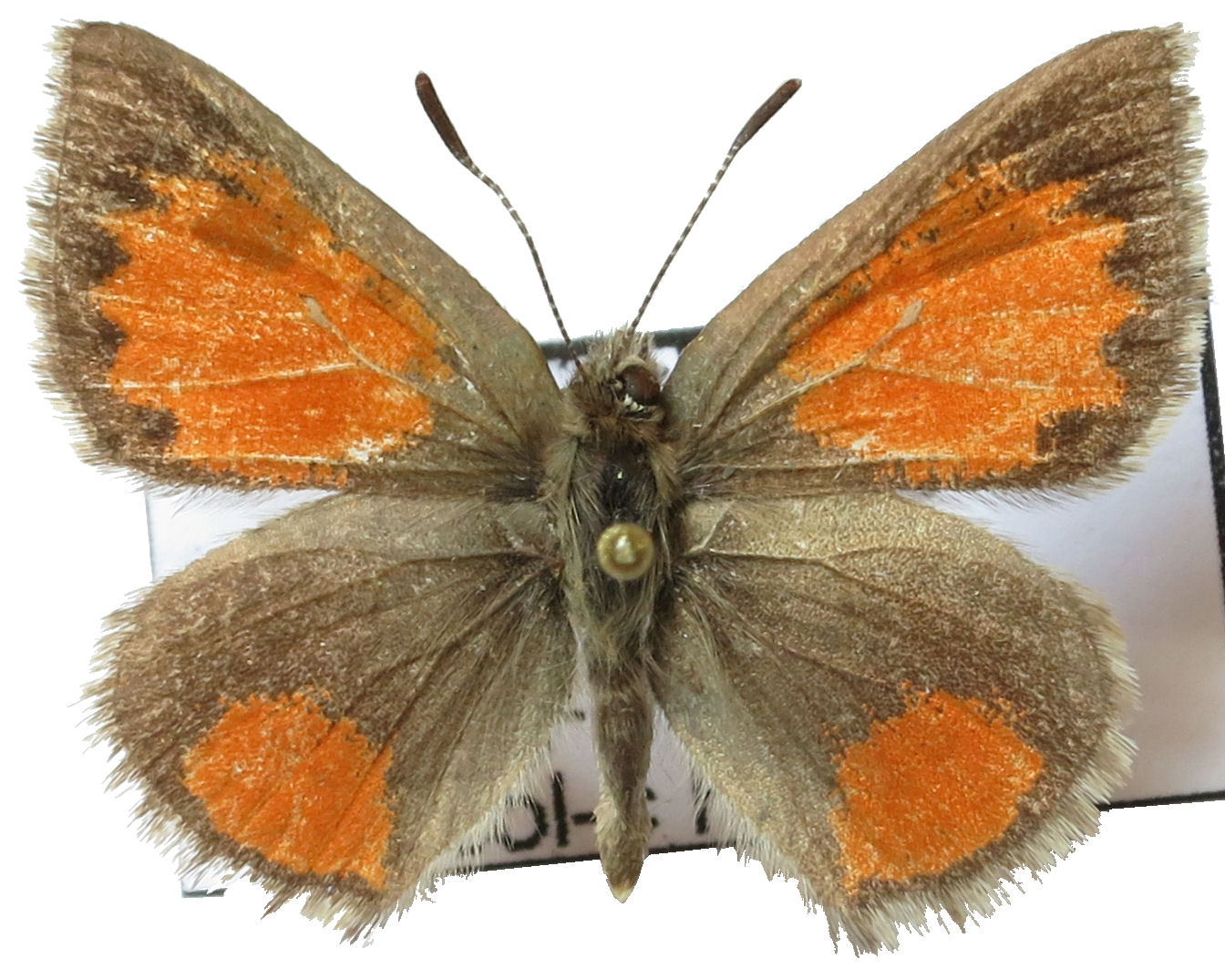
- Tomates callimachus from Turkey

Scientific classification
- Domain: Eukaryota
- Kingdom: Animalia
- Phylum: Arthropoda
- Class: Insecta
- Order: Lepidoptera
- Family: Lycaenidae
- Genus: Tomares
- Species: T. callimachus

Binomial name
- Tomares callimachus (Eversmann, 1848)

Synonyms
- Lycaena callimachus Eversmann, 1848; Tomares epiphania (Boisduval, 1848); Polyommatus epiphania Herrich-Schäffer, 1850; Polyommatus hafis Kollar, [1849]

= Tomares callimachus =

Species of butterfly

Tomares callimachus, the Caucasian vernal copper, is a butterfly of the family Lycaenidae. It is found in Anatolia, Iraq, Iran, the Caucasus, and Transcaucasia.

== Description in Seitz ==
T. callimachus Ev. (= epiphania Boisd., hafis Koll.) (75 e). Above bright fiery cinnabar-red, margins and base of wings black, fringes chequered with brown. Hindwing beneath earth-brown, fasciated with dark brown and minutely dotted with black. Coasts of the Black Sea, Persia and Ferghana. — In the form dentata Stgr., from northern Mesopotamia and Asia Minor, the black distal margin of the wings is very strongly dentate and the hindwing beneath is grey-brown. — Larva reddish yellow-brown, with dark dorsal line and pale lateral one, between which there is a dark stripe composed of small oblique spots; on Astragalus physodes. The butterflies in April and May on hills, not rare.

The wingspan is 18–23 mm. The species inhabits semi-deserts and arid mountain steppes. It occupies an elevation range from 1000 to 2000 m above sea level. The butterfly flies from late March to early June depending on latitude and elevation.

The larvae feed on the Astragalus species A. physodes and A. vulpinus.

== Subspecies ==
- Tomares callimachus callimachus
- Tomares callimachus tauricus Korb & Yakovlev, 1998 (Crimea)
