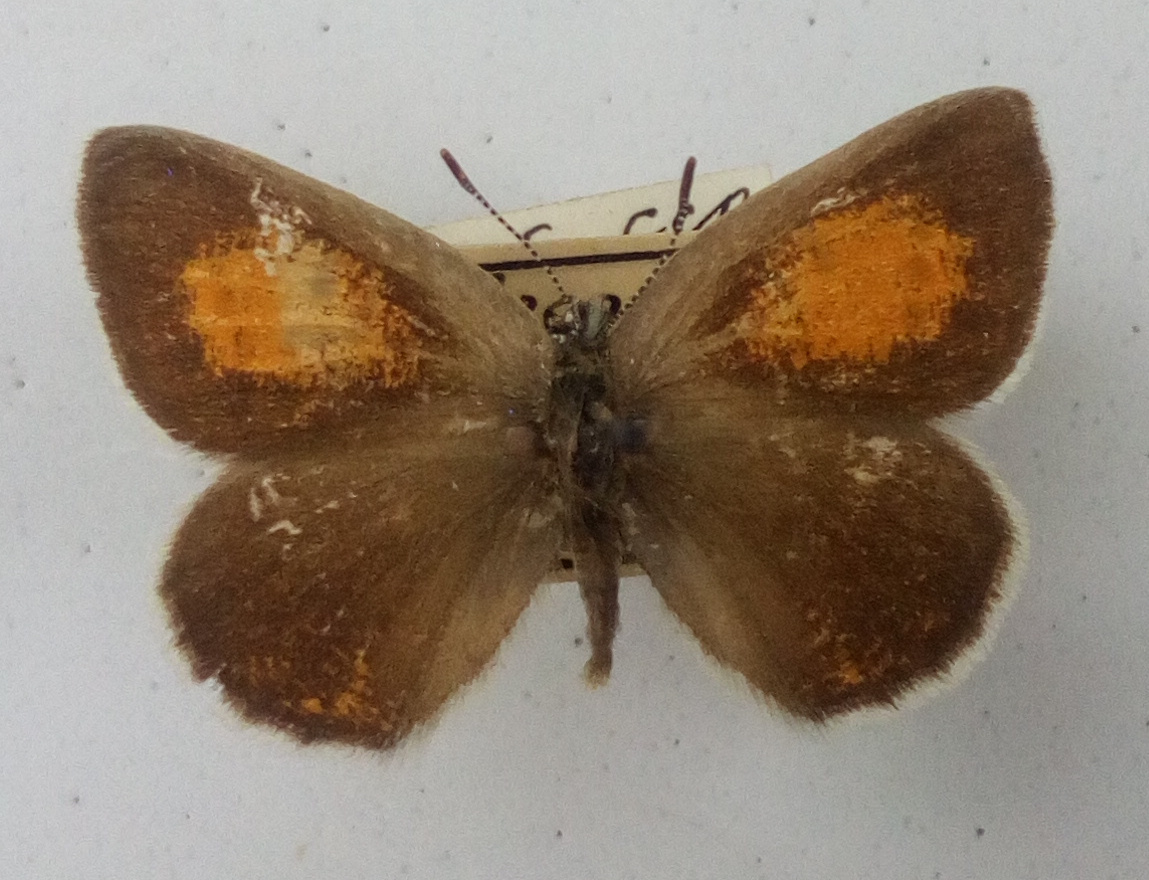

Scientific classification
- Kingdom: Animalia
- Phylum: Arthropoda
- Class: Insecta
- Order: Lepidoptera
- Family: Lycaenidae
- Genus: Tomares
- Species: T. romanovi

Binomial name
- Tomares romanovi (Christoph, 1882)

Synonyms
- Thestor romanovi Christoph, 1882; Thestor romanovi var. maculifera Staudinger, [1892]

= Tomares romanovi =

Species of butterfly

Tomares romanovi, or Romanoff's hairstreak, is a butterfly of the family Lycaenidae. It is found in Armenia, Azerbaijan, Georgia, eastern Turkey, northern Iran, and Kopet Dagh mountains.

The wingspan is 28–30 mm. The species inhabits calcareous grasslands and arid mountain steppes, usually dominated by tragacanth locoweeds. It occupies elevation range from 1200 to 1600 m above sea level. The butterfly flies from late April to mid-June depending on latitude and elevation.

The larvae feed on the Astragalus species A. scharuhdensis and A. finitimus.

== Subspecies ==
- Tomares romanovi romanovi (Armenia, Nakhichevan)
- Tomares romanovi cachetinus Nekrutenko, 1978 (Georgia)
- Tomares romanovi cyprius Stichel, 1911 (Talysh, Kopet-Dagh)
- Tomares romanovi maculifera (Staudinger, [1892])
