= Syrmoptera bonifacei =

Scientific classification
- Domain: Eukaryota
- Kingdom: Animalia
- Phylum: Arthropoda
- Class: Insecta
- Order: Lepidoptera
- Family: Lycaenidae
- Genus: Syrmoptera
- Species: S. bonifacei

Binomial name
- Syrmoptera bonifacei Stempffer, 1961

Species of butterfly

Syrmoptera bonifacei, commonly known as Boniface's false head, is a species of butterfly in the family Lycaenidae, named after Boniface Watulege. It is found in Nigeria (the eastern part of the country and the Cross River loop), Cameroon, and the Republic of the Congo. The habitat consists of forests.
