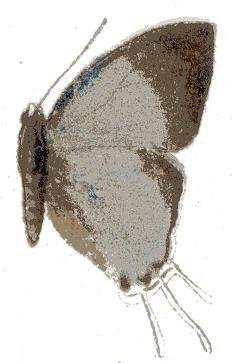

Scientific classification
- Domain: Eukaryota
- Kingdom: Animalia
- Phylum: Arthropoda
- Class: Insecta
- Order: Lepidoptera
- Family: Lycaenidae
- Genus: Syrmoptera
- Species: S. melanomitra

Binomial name
- Syrmoptera melanomitra Karsch, 1895

Synonyms
- Syrmoptera nivea f. androgyna Joicey and Talbot, 1924; Syrmoptera androgyna; Syrmoptera nivea Joicey & Talbot, 1924

= Syrmoptera melanomitra =

Species of butterfly

Syrmoptera melanomitra is a butterfly in the family Lycaenidae. It is found in Cameroon, Gabon, the Republic of the Congo and the Democratic Republic of the Congo.

== Images ==
External images from Royal Museum of Central Africa.

== Subspecies ==
- Syrmoptera melanomitra melanomitra (Cameroon, Gabon, Congo, Democratic Republic of the Congo: Cataractes, Kinshasa and Mongala)
- Syrmoptera melanomitra nivea Joicey & Talbot, 1924 (Democratic Republic of the Congo: Mongala, Uele, Tshopo, Tshuapa, Equateur and Sankuru)
