= Hypomyrina mimetica =

Scientific classification
- Domain: Eukaryota
- Kingdom: Animalia
- Phylum: Arthropoda
- Class: Insecta
- Order: Lepidoptera
- Family: Lycaenidae
- Genus: Hypomyrina
- Species: H. mimetica

Binomial name
- Hypomyrina mimetica Libert, 2004

Species of butterfly

Hypomyrina mimetica, the Libert's orange playboy, is a butterfly in the family Lycaenidae. It is found in Sierra Leone, Liberia, Ivory Coast, Ghana, Nigeria (south and the Cross River loop), Cameroon, the Republic of the Congo, the Central African Republic, the north-eastern part of the Democratic Republic of the Congo and possibly Uganda.
