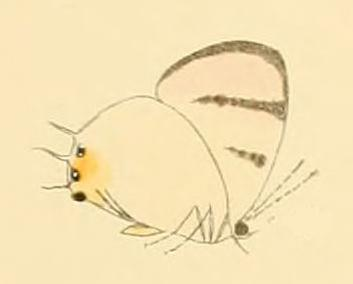

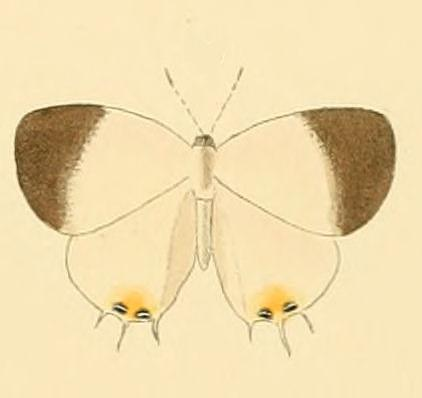

Scientific classification
- Domain: Eukaryota
- Kingdom: Animalia
- Phylum: Arthropoda
- Class: Insecta
- Order: Lepidoptera
- Family: Lycaenidae
- Genus: Syrmoptera
- Species: S. amasa

Binomial name
- Syrmoptera amasa (Hewitson, 1869)

Synonyms
- Myrina amasa Hewitson, 1869

= Syrmoptera amasa =

Species of butterfly

Syrmoptera amasa, the white false head, is a butterfly in the family Lycaenidae. It is found in Nigeria (east and the Cross River loop), Cameroon and Gabon. The habitat consists of forests.
