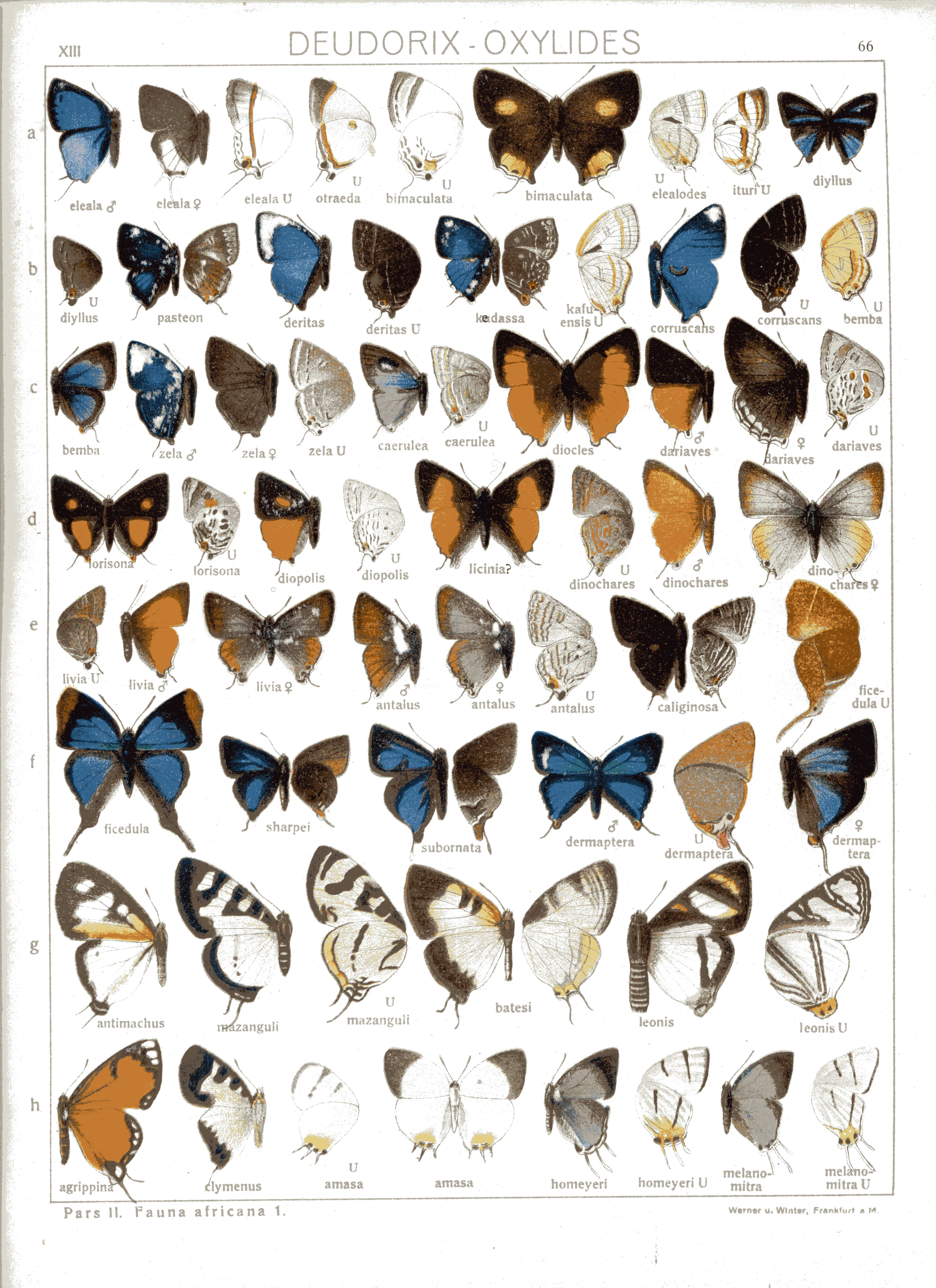
- Syrmoptera amasa, Syrmoptera homeyerii and Syrmoptera melanomitra in Seitz 66h

Scientific classification
- Kingdom: Animalia
- Phylum: Arthropoda
- Class: Insecta
- Order: Lepidoptera
- Family: Lycaenidae
- Subfamily: Theclinae
- Genus: Syrmoptera; Karsch, 1895

= Syrmoptera =

Butterfly genus in family Lycaenidae

Syrmoptera is a genus of butterflies in the family Lycaenidae. They are found in the Afrotropical realm.

== Species ==
- Syrmoptera amasa (Hewitson, 1869)
- Syrmoptera bonifacei Stempffer, 1961
- Syrmoptera caritas Libert, 2004
- Syrmoptera homeyerii (Dewitz, 1879)
- Syrmoptera melanomitra Karsch, 1895
- Syrmoptera mixtura (Hulstaert, 1924)
