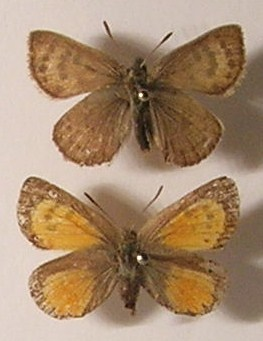
- Tomares mauretanicus

Scientific classification
- Domain: Eukaryota
- Kingdom: Animalia
- Phylum: Arthropoda
- Class: Insecta
- Order: Lepidoptera
- Family: Lycaenidae
- Subfamily: Theclinae
- Tribe: Tomarini; Eliot, 1973
- Genus: Tomares; Rambur, 1840

Species
- See text

= Tomares (butterfly) =

Genus of butterflies

Tomares is a genus of lycaenid butterflies. They are presently the only genus in the tribe Tomarini. As not all Theclinae have been assigned to tribes, this is preliminary however. The species are found in the Palearctic.

== Species ==
- Tomares ballus (Fabricius, 1787) - Provence hairstreak or cardenillo - Iberian Peninsula, Northern Africa, Mediterranean France
- Tomares callimachus (Eversmann, 1848) Iran, Iraq, Caucasus
- Tomares desinens Nekrutenko & Effendi, 1980 Azerbaijan
- Tomares fedtschenkoi (Erschoff, 1874) Afghanistan, Uzbekistan, northern Pakistan
- Tomares mauretanicus (Lucas, 1849) - Moroccan hairstreak - northern Africa
- Tomares nogelii (Herrich-Schäffer, 1851) Romania, Ukraine, Turkey, Syria, Lebanon, Palestine
- Tomares romanovi (Christoph, 1882) Armenia, Turkey, Iran
- Tomares telemachus Zhdanko, 2000 Kopet-Dagh
