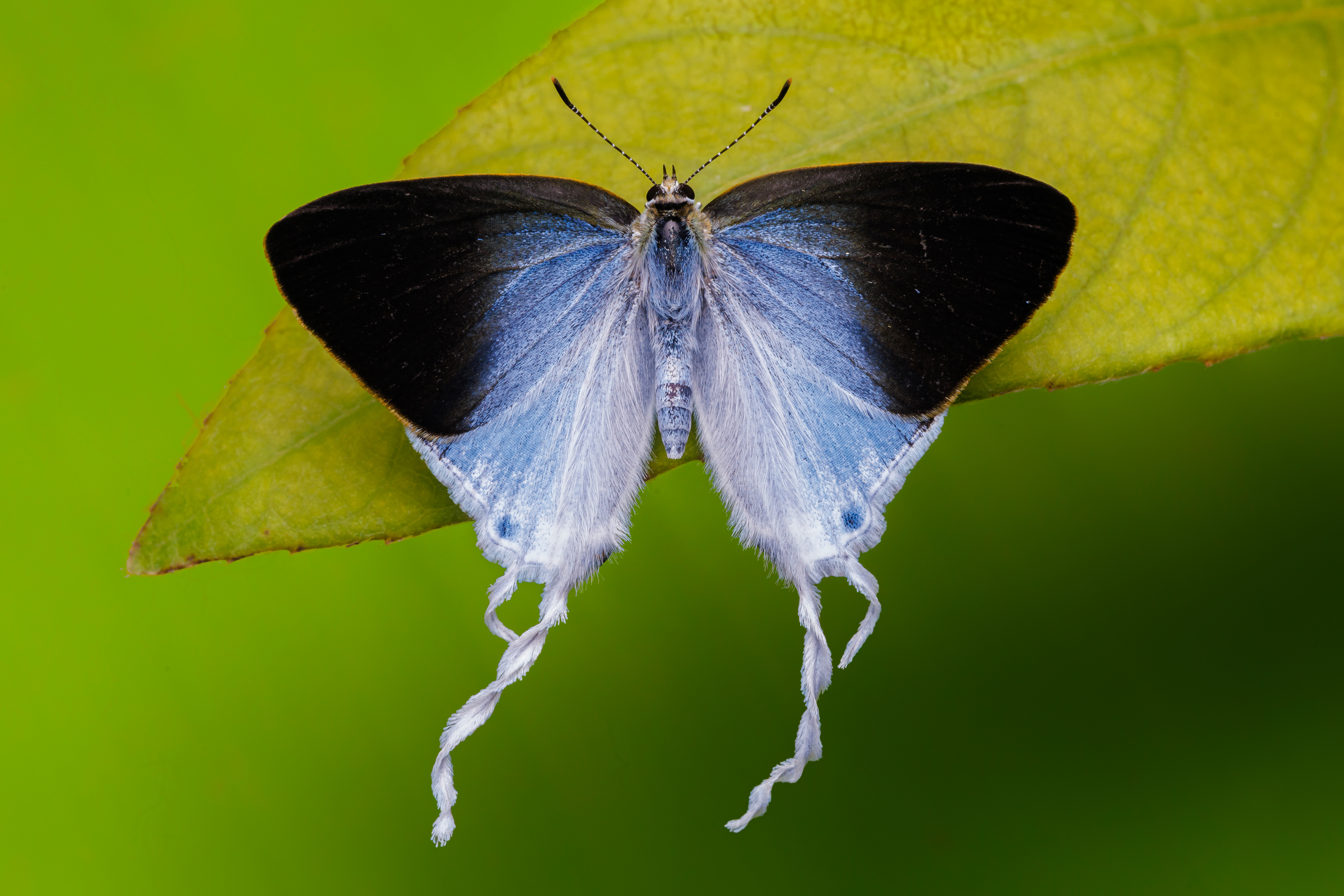
- Z. a. varmona, India
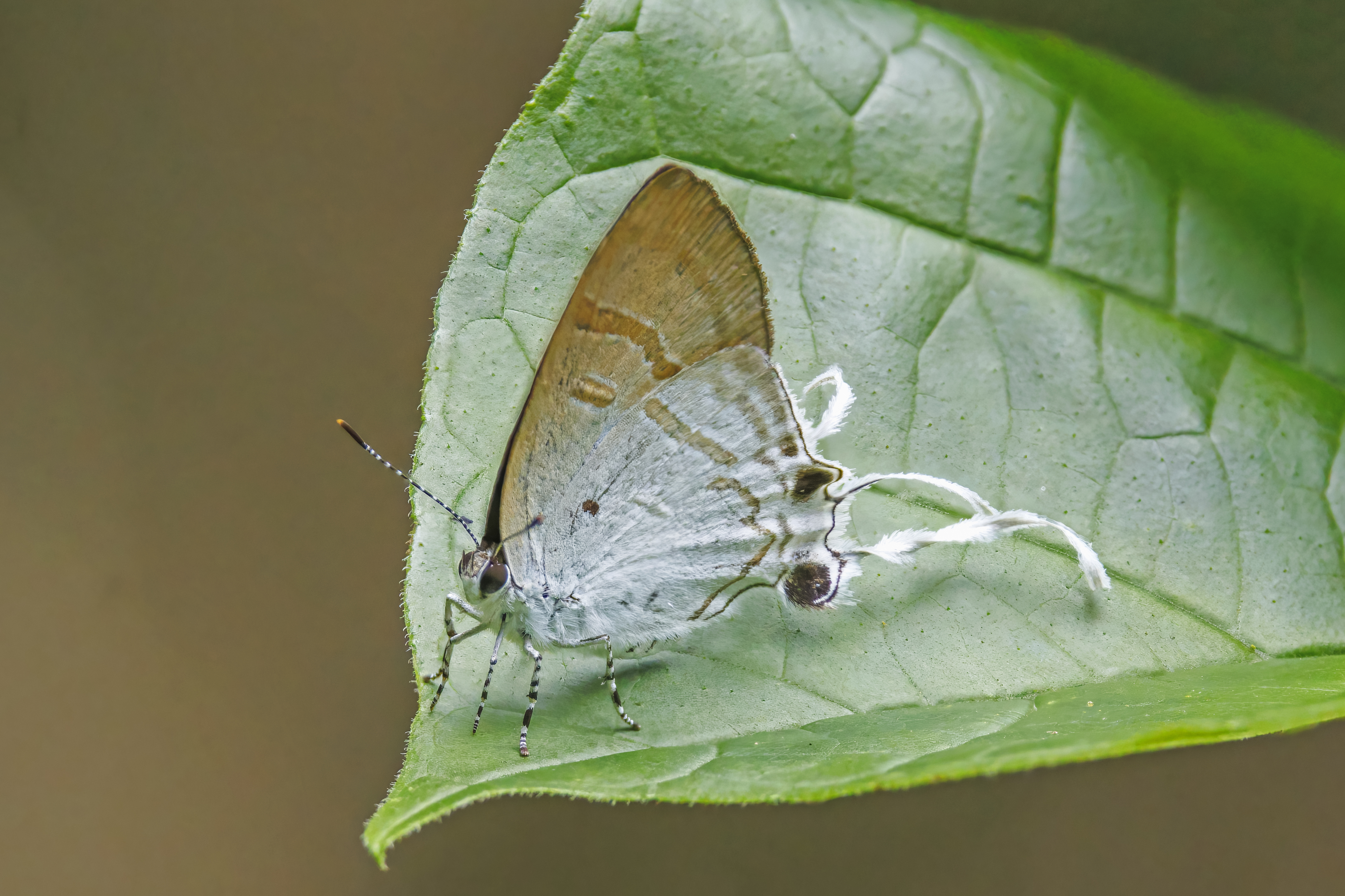
- Z. a. amasa, Hong Kong

Scientific classification
- Kingdom: Animalia
- Phylum: Arthropoda
- Class: Insecta
- Order: Lepidoptera
- Family: Lycaenidae
- Tribe: Hypolycaenini
- Genus: Zeltus de Nicéville in Marshall & de Nicéville, 1890
- Species: Z. amasa

Binomial name
- Zeltus amasa Hewitson, 1865

= Zeltus =

Monotypic butterfly genus in family Lycaenidae

Zeltus is a butterfly genus in the family Lycaenidae, the blues. It is monotypic containing the species Zeltus amasa, the fluffy tit, a small butterfly found in Indomalayan realm. The butterfly is found in India, specially the Western Ghats, Sikkim to Assam. It can also be found in Myanmar, Thailand, West Malaysia, Sumatra, Borneo, Singapore, Java and the Philippines.

== Description ==
The genus is small, and its wingspan is 28–32 millimeter. It has long fluffy tail (v.1, 13 mm.; v.2, 7 mm), which makes it easily recognizable. The forewing (FW) color of male Zeltus is blackish, and the basal area's color is pale blue. The forewing color of female Zeltus is dark brown. The hindwing (HW) color of the male is pale blue, the color of the apex is black.

Zeltus amasa has false eyes, legs, and antennae on the hindwing, which resembles and diverts attention from its real head. If it is attacked, its starts flying in an unexpected direction.

Male. Upperside. Forewing with a small basal space, consisting of the basal half of the cell, and the lower basal portion of the wing greyish-blue, the rest of the wing black. Hindwing with a large black patch at the apex, the rest of the wing greyish-blue, paling hindwards and becoming more or less pure white at the anal angle and on the abdominal fold; tails white, with a pale blue line down their centres, a pale blackish spot at the anal angle and another in the first interspace. Cilia white. Underside. Forewing, pale rufous-brown, four-fifths of the hinder marginal area from the base below vein 2 bluish-white, markings slightly darker than the ground colour; a bar at the end of the cell, edged on both sides with white, a slightly outwardly curved, even discal narrow band of the same width as the cell bar, edged on both sides with white, extending from near the costa to below vein 2, an indistinct similar sub-marginal band without the white edgings. Hiudwing with the upper portion of a paler rufous-brown, paling hindwards, and becoming pale bluish-grey on the lower two-thirds of the wing; a black sub-basal spot below the costa, a pale bar at the end of the cell, edged on both sides with white, a discal broken band of the same narrow width as on the forewing, edged on both sides with white, in a straight line from the costa to vein 4, a linear mark in the next lower interspace well inwards, and below it a line twice acutely angled, then bending inwards straight on to the abdominal margin above the anal angle, a sub-marginal double series of somewhat lunular marks, the outer series ending in a large black spot in the first interspace just above the upper tail, and another at the anal angle; a terminal fine black line with an inner white line. Antennge black, ringed with white; head and body blackish above, with blue pubescence, whitish below. Female. Upperside brown. Forewing with the outer portion shading a little darker. Hindwing with the costa narrowly pale, the rest of the wing brown, paling hindwards and becoming white towards the anal angle, a large black sub-terminal spot above the upper tail, a small one at the anal angle, a suffused brownish spot or mark between them, a short double series of brownish lunular marks on the white ground above them. Underside paler than in the male, markings similar.

— Charles Swinhoe, Lepidoptera Indica. Vol. IX

== Habit ==
The genus is mostly found at hot, wet forest areas. It flies feebly. The male Zeltus rarely visits flowers, and stays on wet or damp patches, or on the leaves which are about 10 feet (3.0 m) above the ground. The female mostly stays inside deep forest and is rarely seen.

== Gallery ==
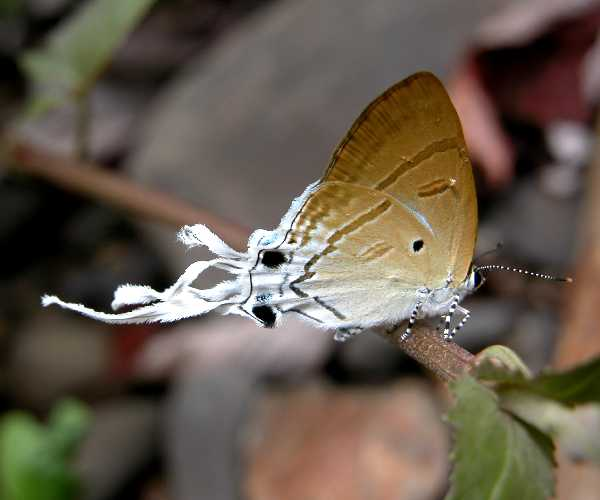
From Jairampur, Arunachal Pradesh, India

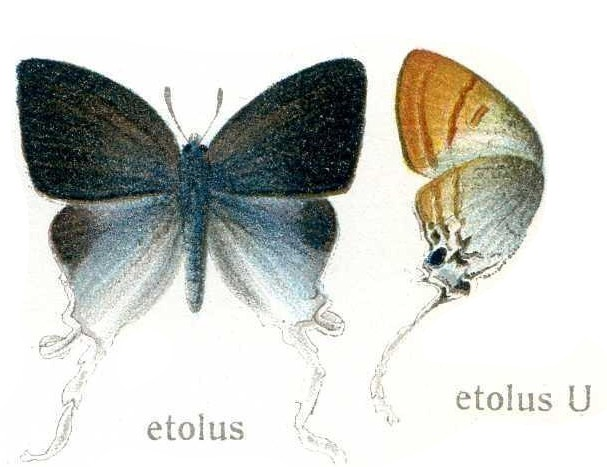
Underside on right, from Adalbert Seitz's Macrolepidoptera, 1915

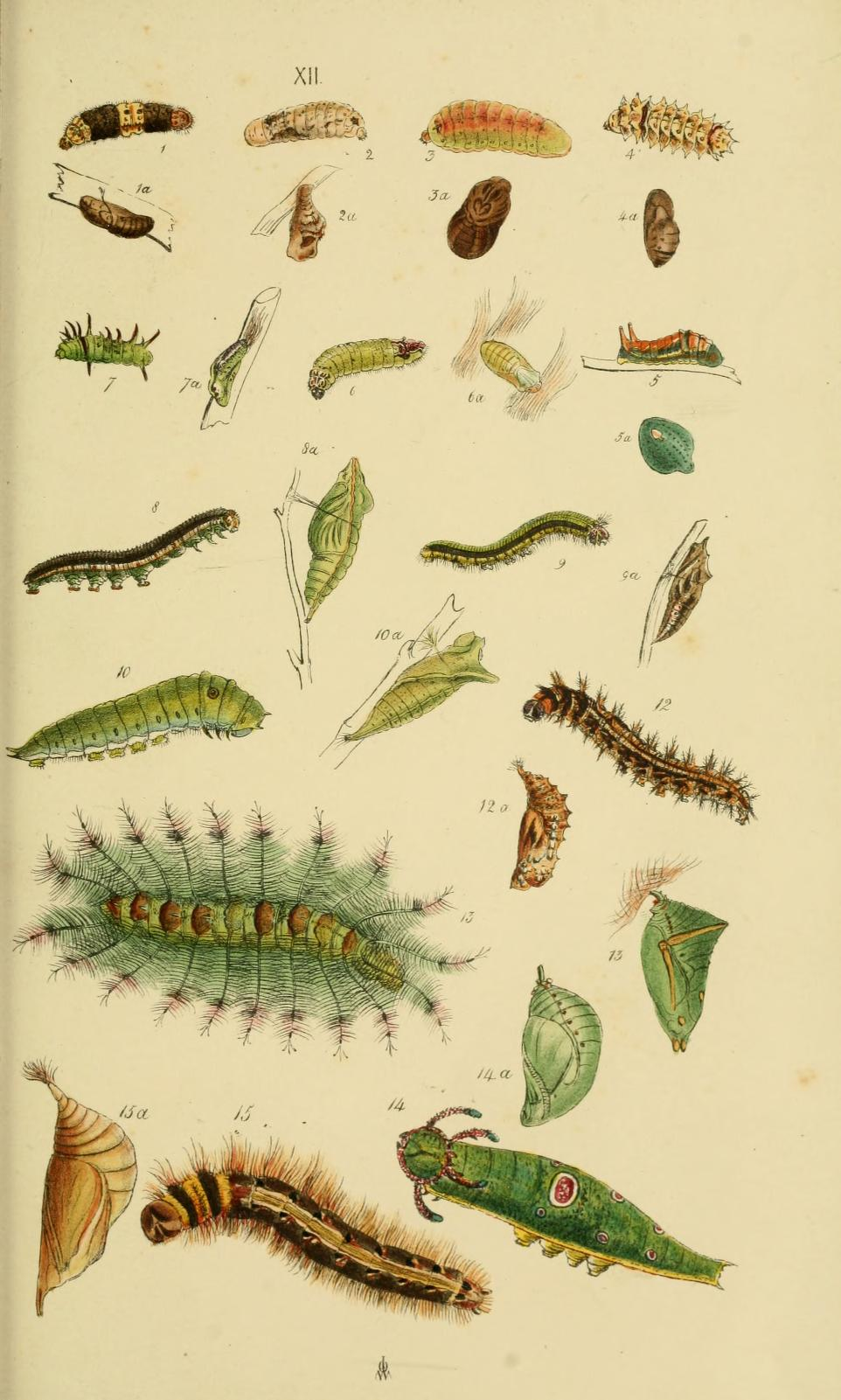
Larva (figure 6) and pupa (figure 7)
