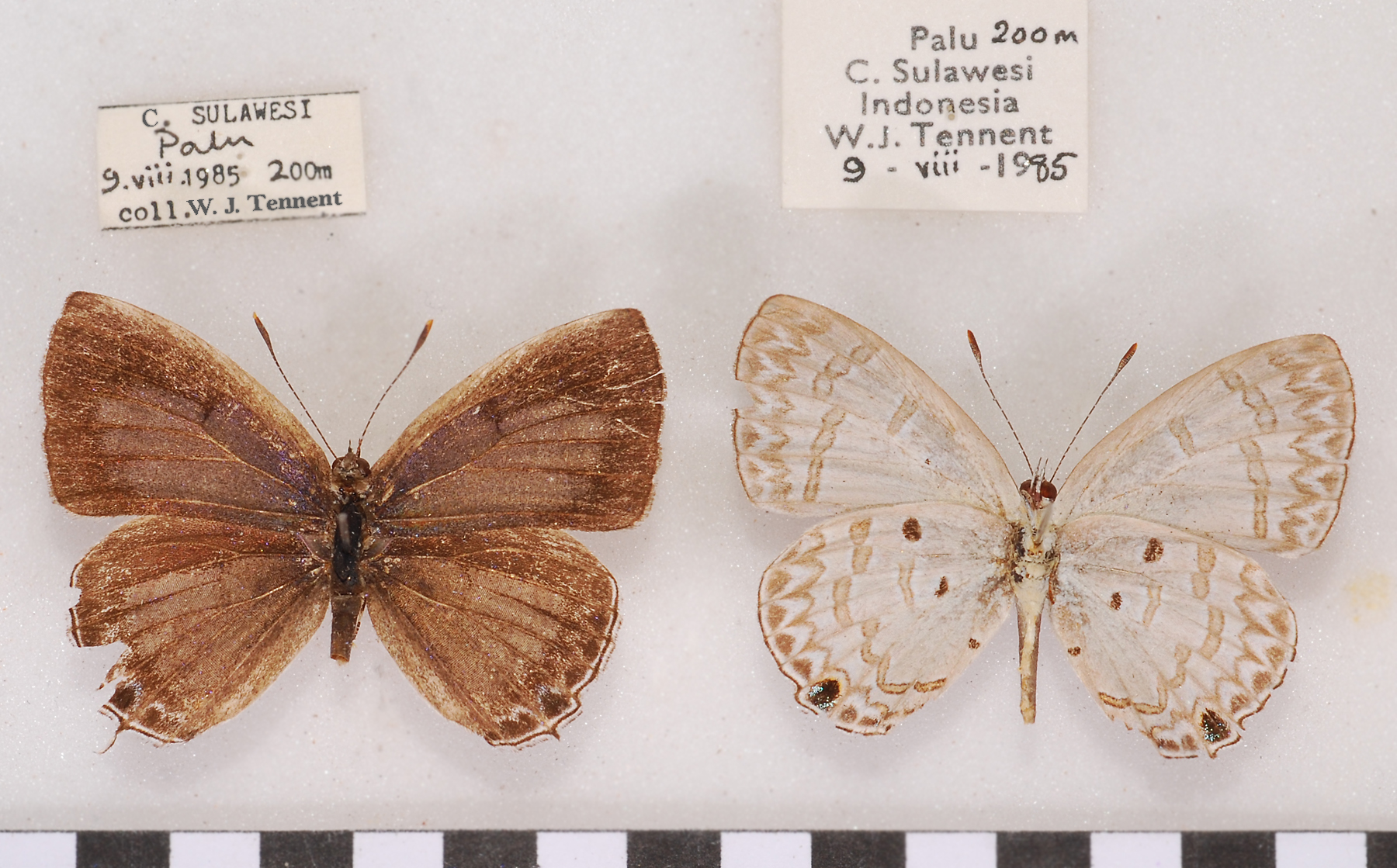

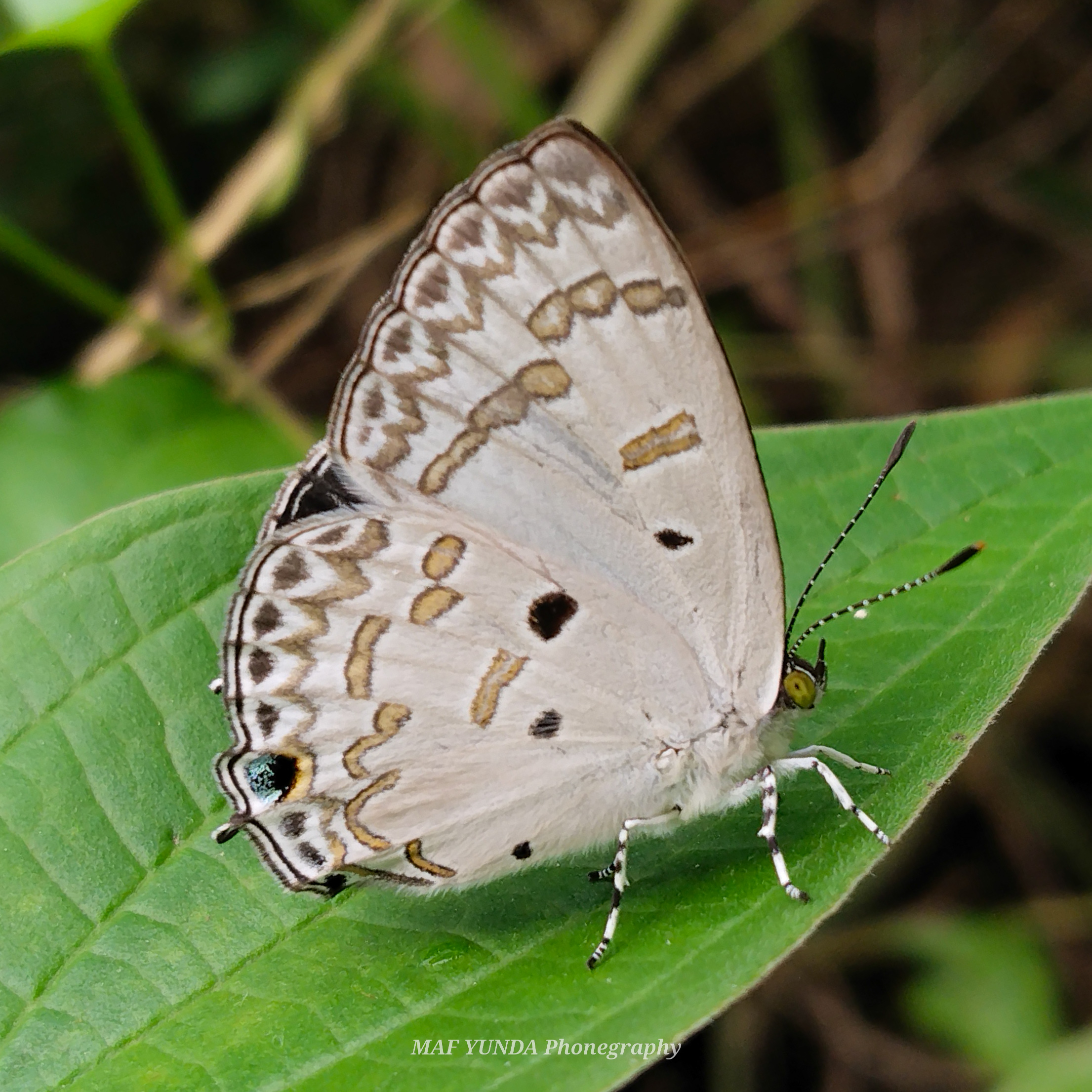
- Hypothecla honos is a butterfly from the Lycaenidae family that is endemic to Sulawesi.

Scientific classification
- Kingdom: Animalia
- Phylum: Arthropoda
- Class: Insecta
- Order: Lepidoptera
- Family: Lycaenidae
- Genus: Hypothecla
- Species: H. honos

Binomial name
- Hypothecla honos de Nicéville, 1898

= Hypothecla honos =

Species of butterfly

Hypothecla honos is a butterfly in the family Lycaenidae. It is found on Sulawesi and Banggai.
