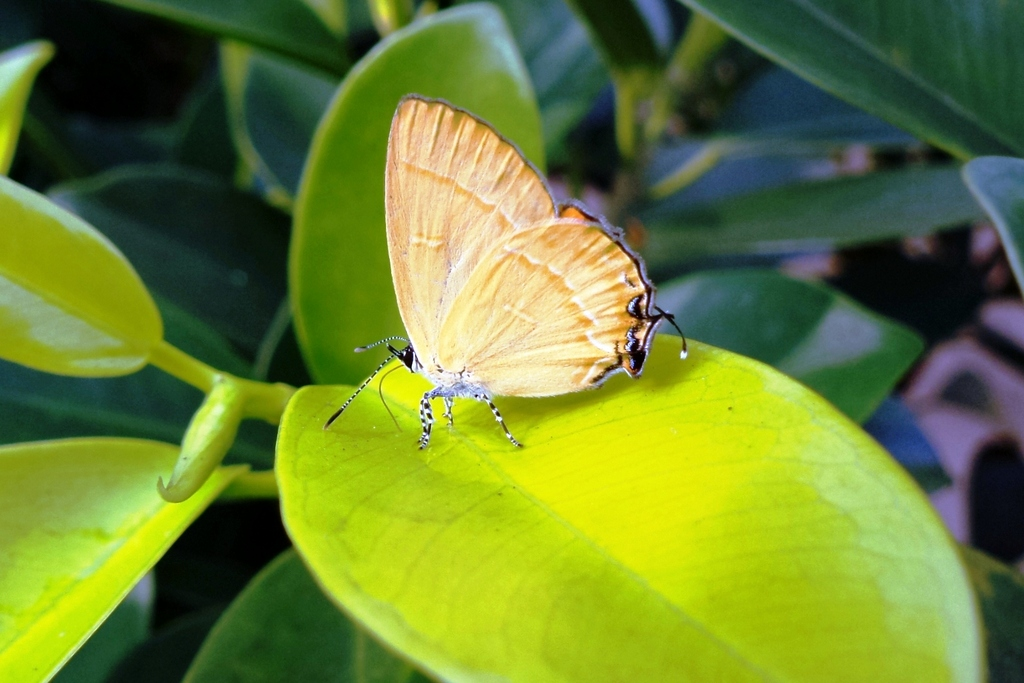

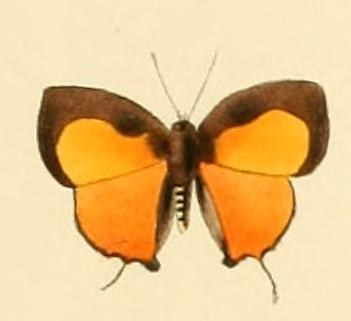

Scientific classification
- Domain: Eukaryota
- Kingdom: Animalia
- Phylum: Arthropoda
- Class: Insecta
- Order: Lepidoptera
- Family: Lycaenidae
- Genus: Hypomyrina
- Species: H. nomenia

Binomial name
- Hypomyrina nomenia (Hewitson, 1874)

Synonyms
- Myrina nomenia Hewitson, 1874

= Hypomyrina nomenia =

Species of butterfly

Hypomyrina nomenia, the orange playboy, is a butterfly in the family Lycaenidae. It is found in Nigeria, Cameroon, the Republic of the Congo, Angola, the Central African Republic, the Democratic Republic of the Congo, Uganda, Tanzania and Zambia. The habitat consists of forests.

== Subspecies ==
- Hypomyrina nomenia nomenia (Nigeria: west, south and the Cross River loop, Cameroon, Congo, Angola, Central African Republic, Democratic Republic of the Congo: Kivu)
- Hypomyrina nomenia extensa Libert, 2004 (Uganda, western Tanzania, Democratic Republic of the Congo: Shaba, north-western Zambia)
