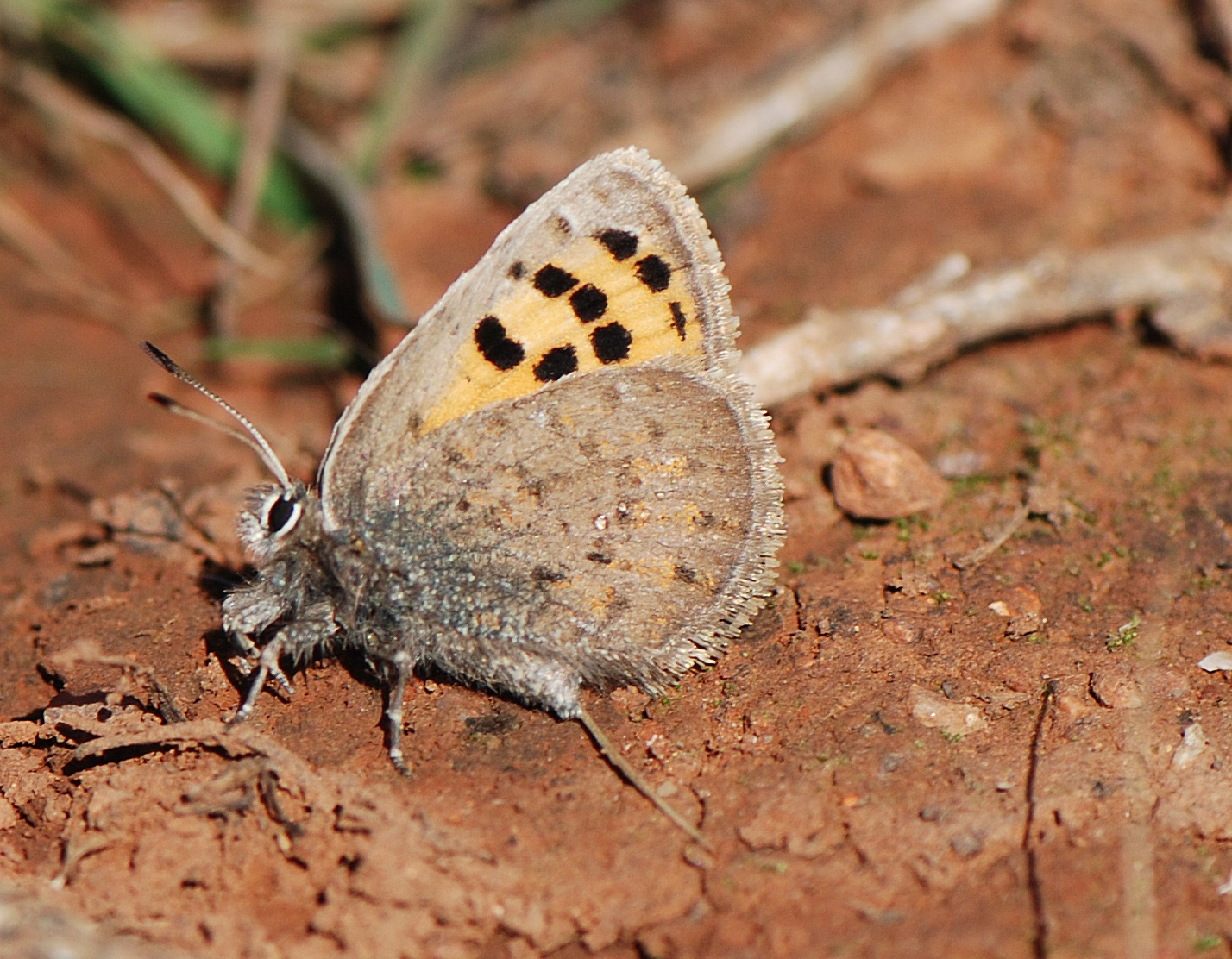
- Living specimen
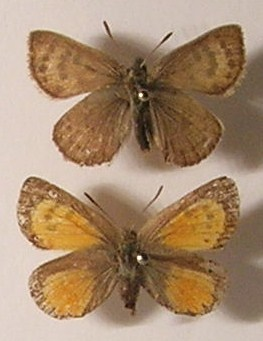
- Male (top) and female

Scientific classification
- Domain: Eukaryota
- Kingdom: Animalia
- Phylum: Arthropoda
- Class: Insecta
- Order: Lepidoptera
- Family: Lycaenidae
- Genus: Tomares
- Species: T. mauretanicus

Binomial name
- Tomares mauretanicus (H. Lucas, 1849)

Synonyms
- Polyommatus mauretanicus H. Lucas, 1849; Polyommatus mauretanicus var. undulatus Gerhard, 1853; Thestor mauretanicus ab. sabulosus Oberthür, 1910; Thestor mauretanicus var. boisduvali Oberthür, 1910; Thestor mauretanicus ab. tristis Oberthür, 1915; Thestor mauretanicus f. subtus-reductus Zopp, 1954; Thestor mauretanicus f. subtus-confluens Zopp, 1954; Thestor mauretanicus f. maroccanus Zopp, 1954; Tomares mauretanicus antonius Brevignon, 1985

= Tomares mauretanicus =

Species of butterfly

Tomares mauretanicus, the Moroccan hairstreak, is a butterfly of the family Lycaenidae.

== Description ==
The wingspan is 28–30 mm.

== Habitat ==
Grassy places from sea level to 2400 m

== Distribution ==
It is found only in northern Africa.

== Life cycle and behaviour ==
The butterfly flies from January to March. In the High Atlas it flies into June.

The larvae feed on Hippocrepis multisiliquosa, Hippocrepis minor, Hedysarum pallidum, Astragalus epiglottis and Astragalus pentaglottis. The eggs are laid in clusters on the leaves of the host plant. The species flies on hot, dry hillsides and it has been known to 'hilltop'.

== Subspecies ==
- Tomares mauretanicus mauretanicus (Algeria)
- Tomares mauretanicus antonius (Brévignon, 1984) (Middle Atlas in Morocco)
- Tomares mauretanicus amelnorum (Tarrier, 1997) (Anti-Atlas in Morocco)
