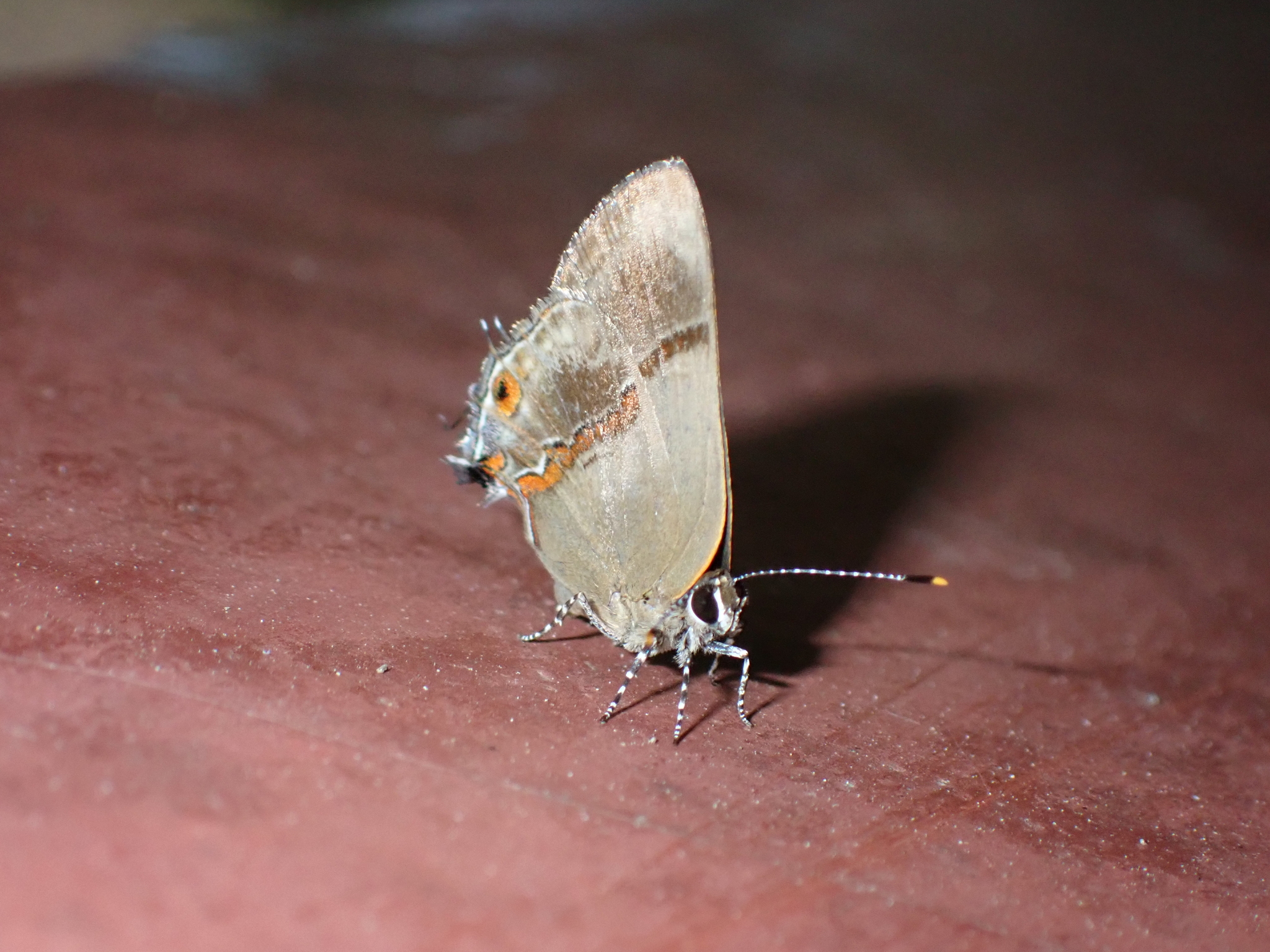
- Lamprospilus collucia from Paz de Ariporo, Colombia

Scientific classification
- Kingdom: Animalia
- Phylum: Arthropoda
- Class: Insecta
- Order: Lepidoptera
- Family: Lycaenidae
- Tribe: Eumaeini
- Genus: Lamprospilus; Geyer, 1832

Synonyms
- Gigantorubra Johnson, 1993

= Lamprospilus =

Butterfly genus in family Lycaenidae

Lamprospilus is a Neotropical genus of butterfly in the family Lycaenidae. This genus was first described in 1832 by Carl Geyer.

== Description ==
Lamprospilus have sexually dimorphic wing patterns. Some males have distinctive transparent wing patches. Males and females can appear so distinct that males and females have sometimes been first described as different species.

== Distribution ==
Lamprospilus sp. are found in both wet and dry lowlands and montane forests in Central and South America from Mexico to central Argentina.

== Species ==
There are at least seven recognized species:

- Lamprospilus azaria (Hewitson, 1867)
- Lamprospilus bicolor Prieto & Faynel, 2023
- Lamprospilus decorata Lathy, 1926
- Lamprospilus draudti Lathy, 1932
- Lamprospilus genius Geyer, 1832
- Lamprospilus nicetus (C.Felder & R.Felder, 1865)
- Lamprospilus stegmaier Prieto & Faynel, 2023

Some sources also recognize the following:

- Lamprospilus collucia (Hewitson, 1877)

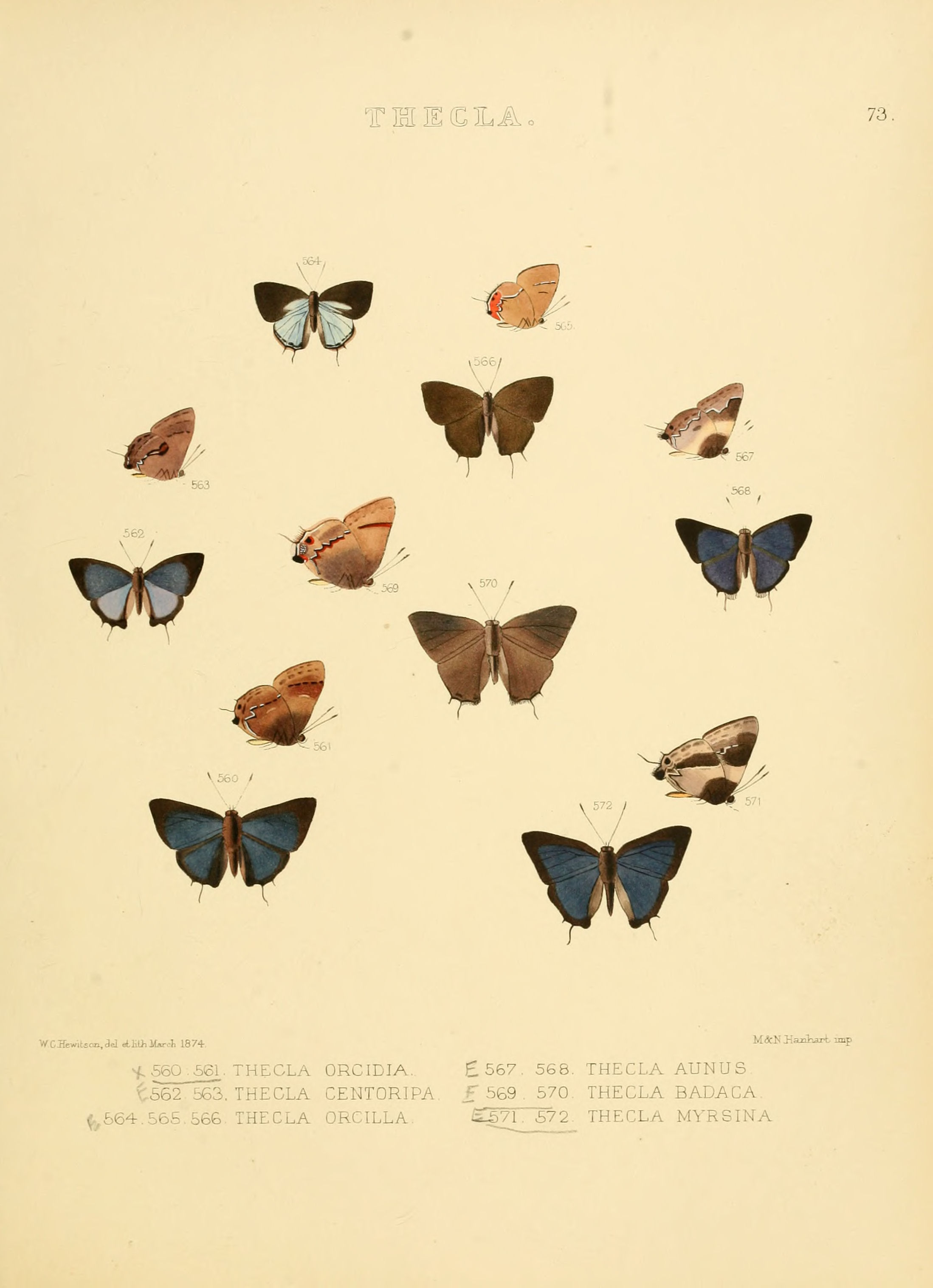
Lamprospilus and other Lycaenidae depicted in William Chapman Hewitson's Illustrations of diurnal Lepidoptera
