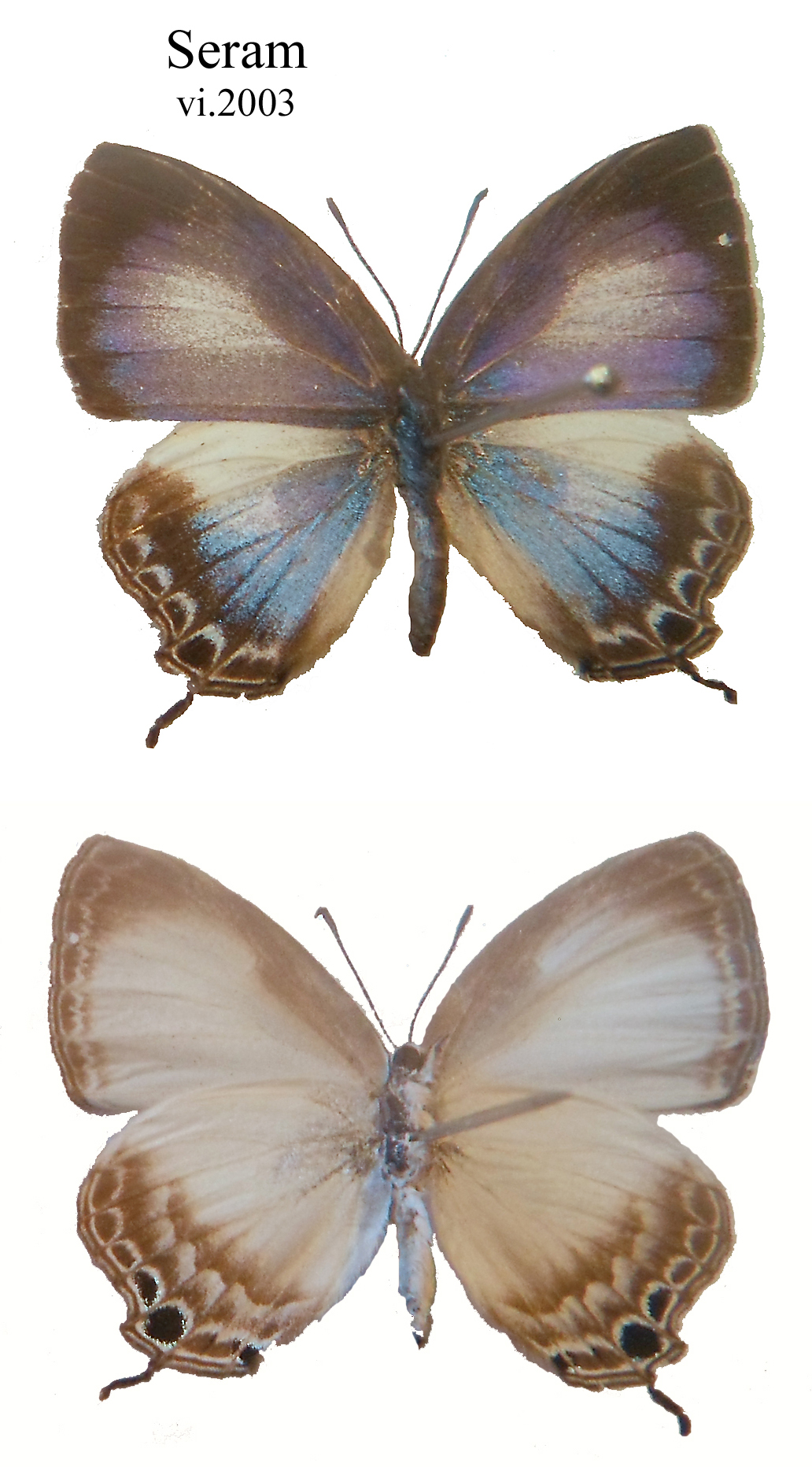
- H. l. buruana
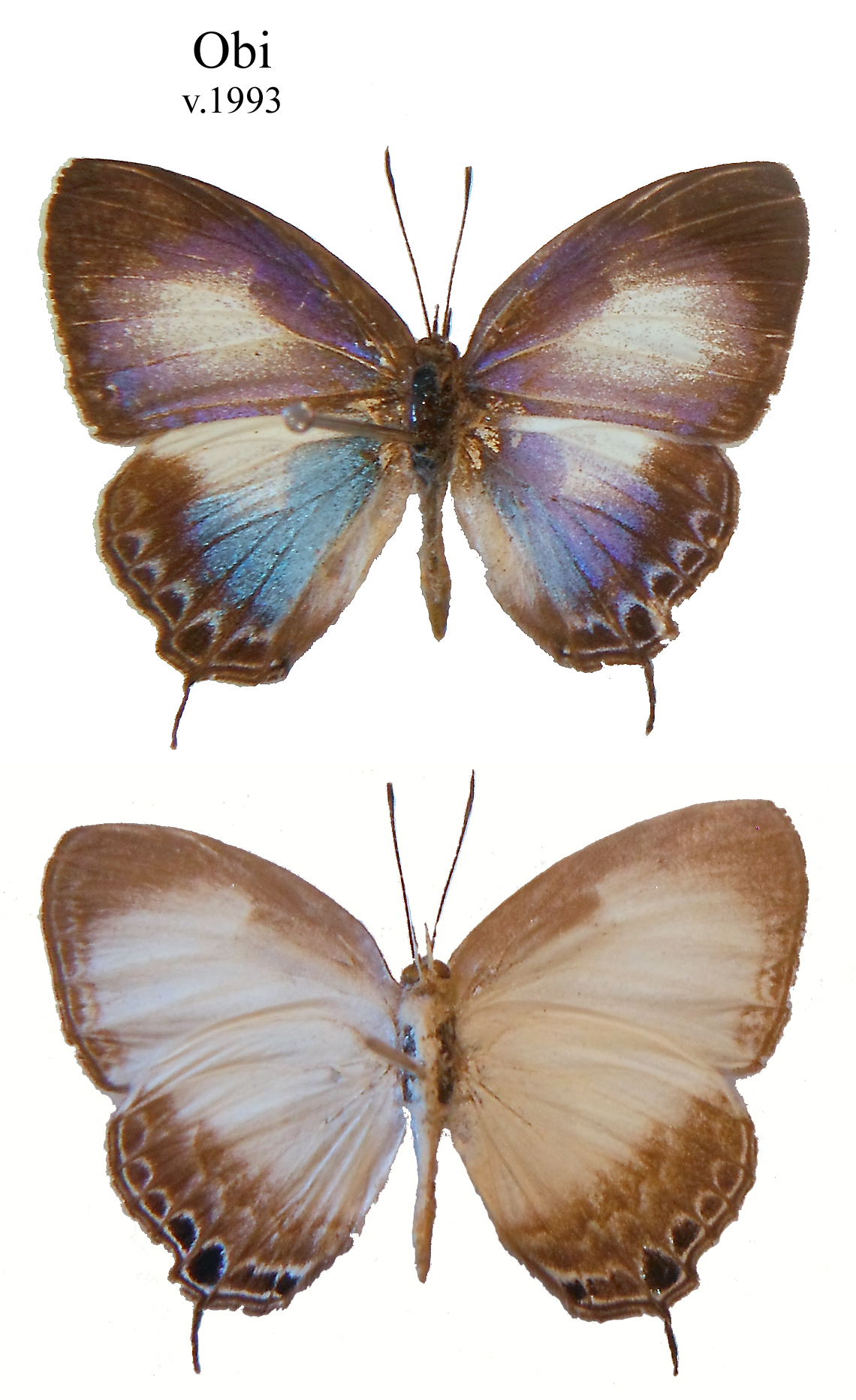
- H. l. obiana

Scientific classification
- Domain: Eukaryota
- Kingdom: Animalia
- Phylum: Arthropoda
- Class: Insecta
- Order: Lepidoptera
- Family: Lycaenidae
- Genus: Hypochlorosis
- Species: H. lorquinii

Binomial name
- Hypochlorosis lorquinii (C. Felder & R. Felder, 1865)

Synonyms
- Myrina lorquinii C. & R. Felder, 1865; Hypochlorosis buruana Holland, 1900; Pseudonotis obiana Fruhstorfer, 1908

= Hypochlorosis lorquinii =

Species of butterfly

Hypochlorosis lorquinii is a butterfly in the family Lycaenidae. It is found on Maluku and Fergusson Island.

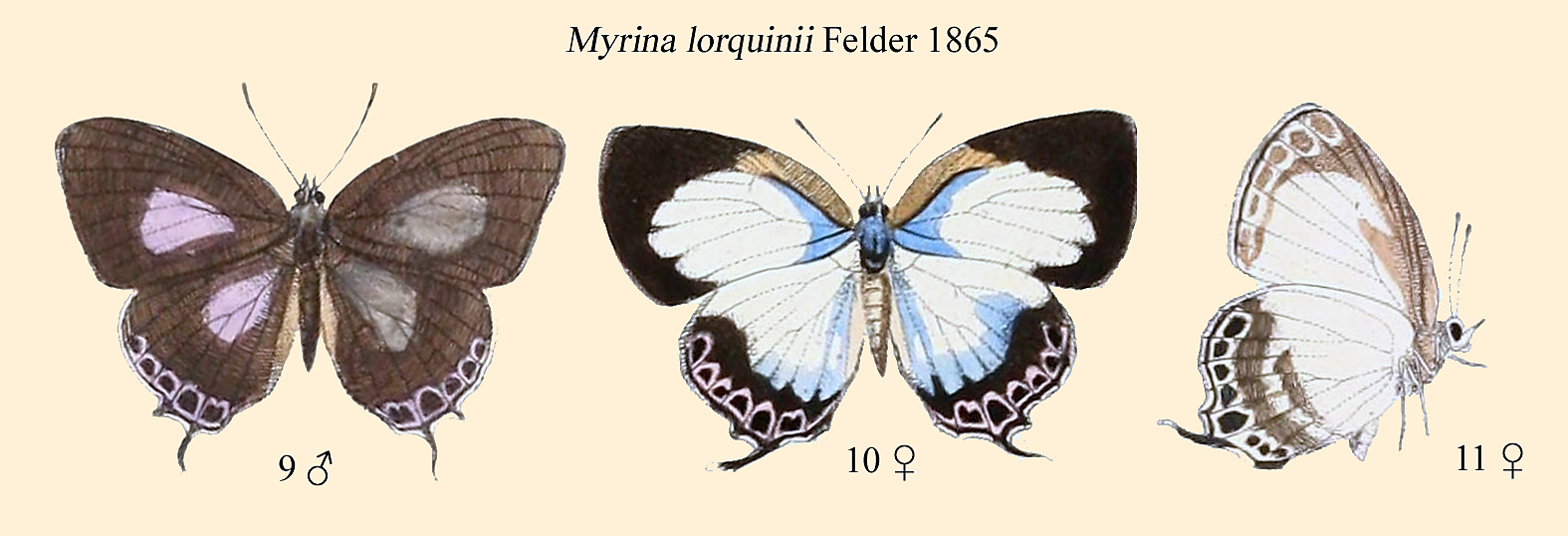
H. l. lorquinii

== Subspecies ==
- H. l. lorquinii (Indonesia, Maluku, Aru, Halmahera)
- H. l. buruana Holland, 1900 (Buru)
- H. l. obiana (Fruhstorfer, 1908) (Obi)
