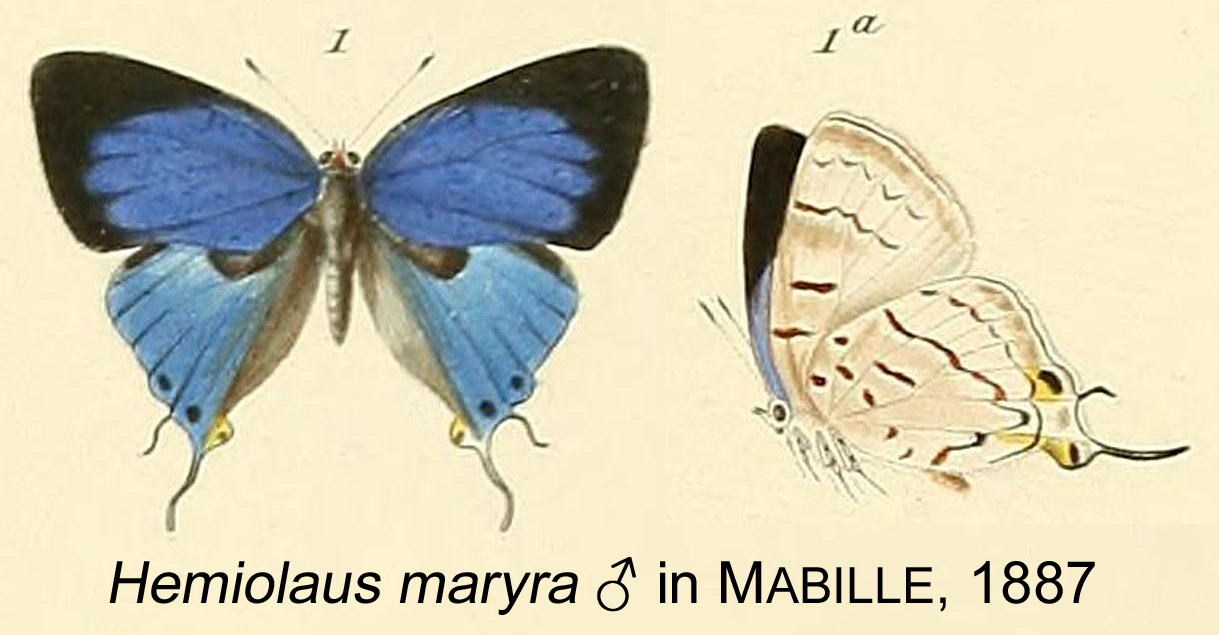

Scientific classification
- Kingdom: Animalia
- Phylum: Arthropoda
- Class: Insecta
- Order: Lepidoptera
- Family: Lycaenidae
- Genus: Hemiolaus
- Species: H. maryra

Binomial name
- Hemiolaus maryra (Mabille, [1887])

Synonyms
- Hypolycaena maryra Mabille, [1887]; Iolaus (Hemiolaus) maryra

= Hemiolaus maryra =

Species of butterfly

Hemiolaus maryra is a butterfly in the family Lycaenidae. It is found on Madagascar. The habitat consists of forests.
