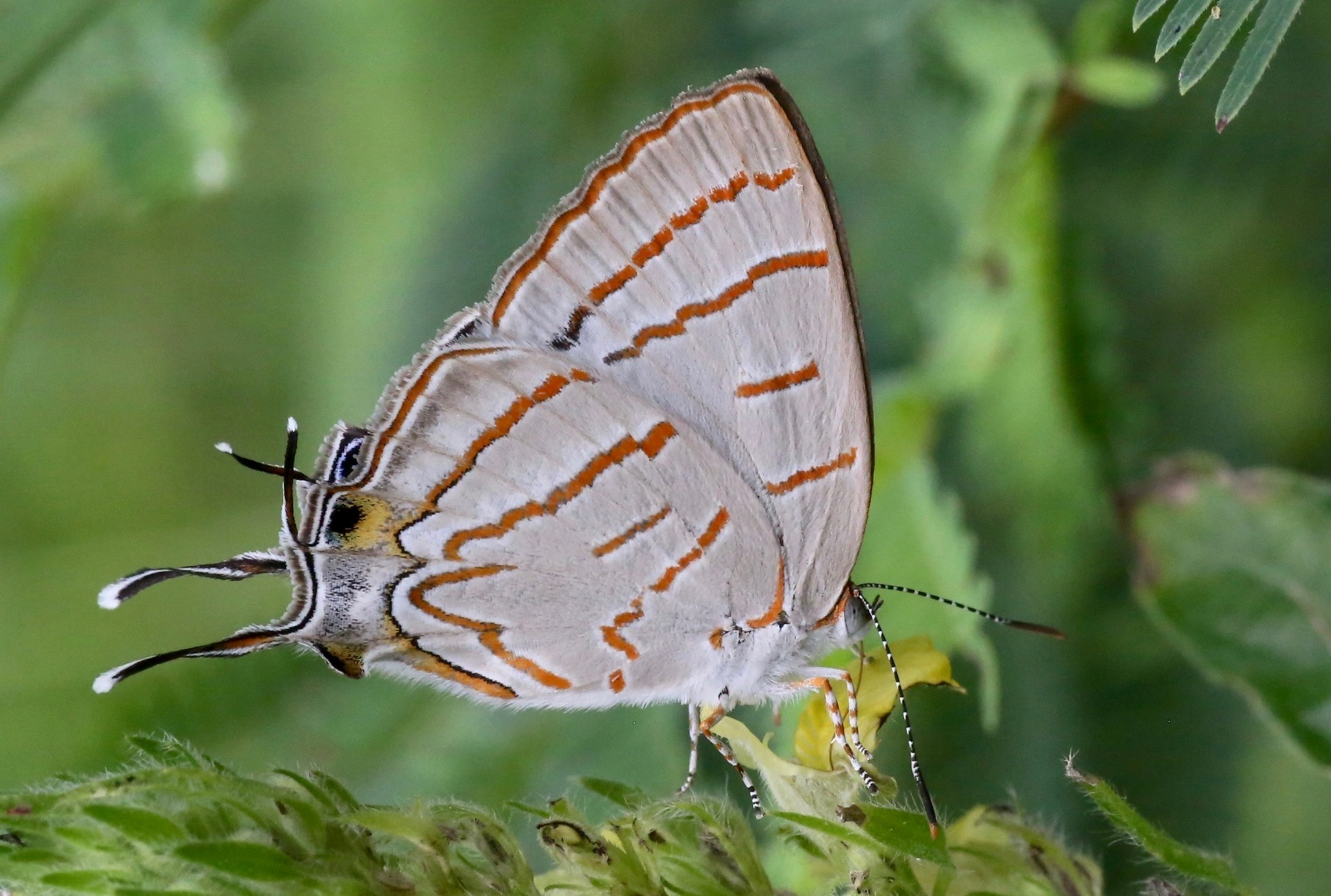
- Summer form of the nominate subsp. in Mpumalanga, South Africa

Scientific classification
- Kingdom: Animalia
- Phylum: Arthropoda
- Clade: Pancrustacea
- Class: Insecta
- Order: Lepidoptera
- Family: Lycaenidae
- Genus: Hemiolaus
- Species: H. caeculus

Binomial name
- Hemiolaus caeculus (Hopffer, 1855)

Synonyms
- Hypolycaena caeculus (Hopffer, 1855); Iolaus caeculus Hopffer, 1855; Hypolycaena dolores Suffert, 1904; Hypolycaena caeculus obscurus Suffert, 1904; Hypolycaena caeculus ab. duponti Dufrane, 1953; Iolaus caeculus tsodiloensis Pinhey, 1969

= Hemiolaus caeculus =

Azure hairstreak

Species of butterfly

Hemiolaus caeculus, the azure hairstreak, is a butterfly of the family Lycaenidae. It is found in East and southern Africa.

The wingspan is 30–35 mm for males and 34–38 mm for females. Adults are on wing year round with peaks after rains.

The larvae feed on Olax species, including Olax dissitiflora and Olax obtusifolia.

== Subspecies ==
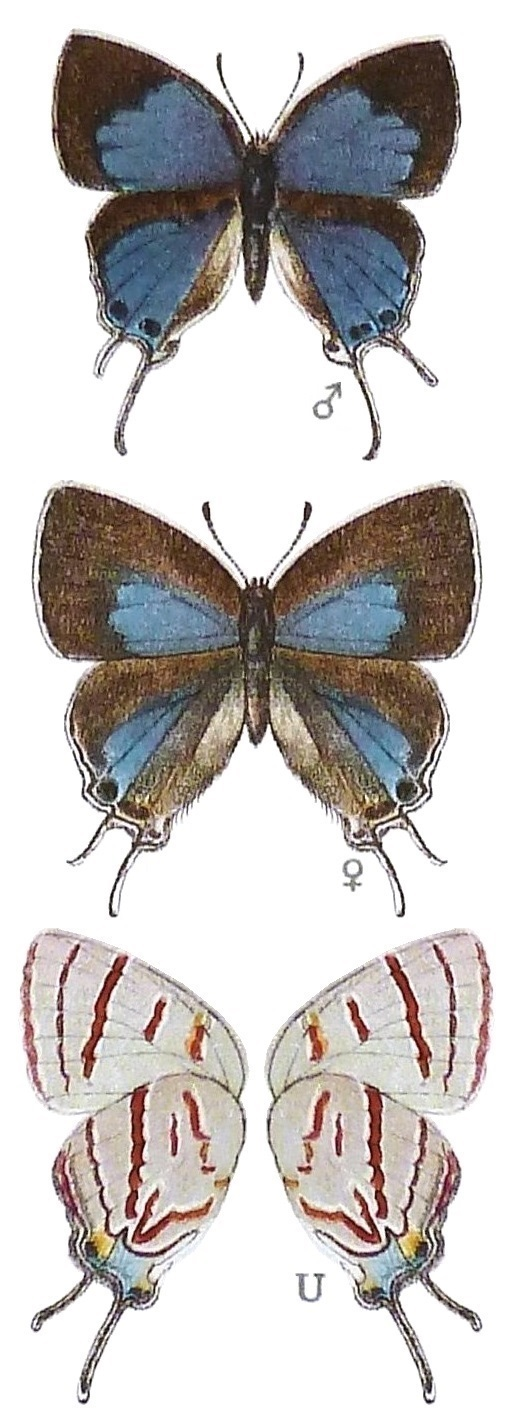
In Seitz (1910)

- Hemiolaus caeculus caeculus — Cape, KwaZulu-Natal, Transvaal, Mozambique, Zimbabwe, Malawi, eastern Zambia, south-eastern Tanzania
- Hemiolaus caeculus littoralis Stempffer, 1954 — coast of eastern Kenya and eastern Tanzania, Usambara Mountains
- Hemiolaus caeculus vividus Pinhey, 1962 — western Zambia, south-western Tanzania, southern Zaire (south-eastern Shaba)
- Hemiolaus caeculus tsodiloensis (Pinhey, 1969) — northern Botswana
