= Hypomyrina fournierae =

Scientific classification
- Domain: Eukaryota
- Kingdom: Animalia
- Phylum: Arthropoda
- Class: Insecta
- Order: Lepidoptera
- Family: Lycaenidae
- Genus: Hypomyrina
- Species: H. fournierae

Binomial name
- Hypomyrina fournierae Gabriel, 1939

Species of butterfly

Hypomyrina fournierae, the Gabriel's orange playboy, is a butterfly in the family Lycaenidae. It is found in Sierra Leone, western Nigeria, Cameroon, Gabon, the Republic of the Congo, the north-eastern part of the Democratic Republic of the Congo and western Uganda.
