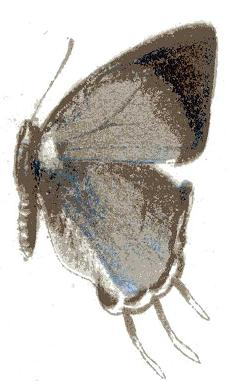

Scientific classification
- Domain: Eukaryota
- Kingdom: Animalia
- Phylum: Arthropoda
- Class: Insecta
- Order: Lepidoptera
- Family: Lycaenidae
- Genus: Syrmoptera
- Species: S. homeyerii

Binomial name
- Syrmoptera homeyerii (Dewitz, 1879)

Synonyms
- Hypolylaena homeyerii Dewitz, 1879

= Syrmoptera homeyerii =

Species of butterfly

Syrmoptera homeyerii is a butterfly in the family Lycaenidae. It is found in the Democratic Republic of the Congo (Uele, Sankuru, Lualaba, Lomani, Tanganika and Maniema) and Angola.

== Images ==
External images from Royal Museum of Central Africa.
