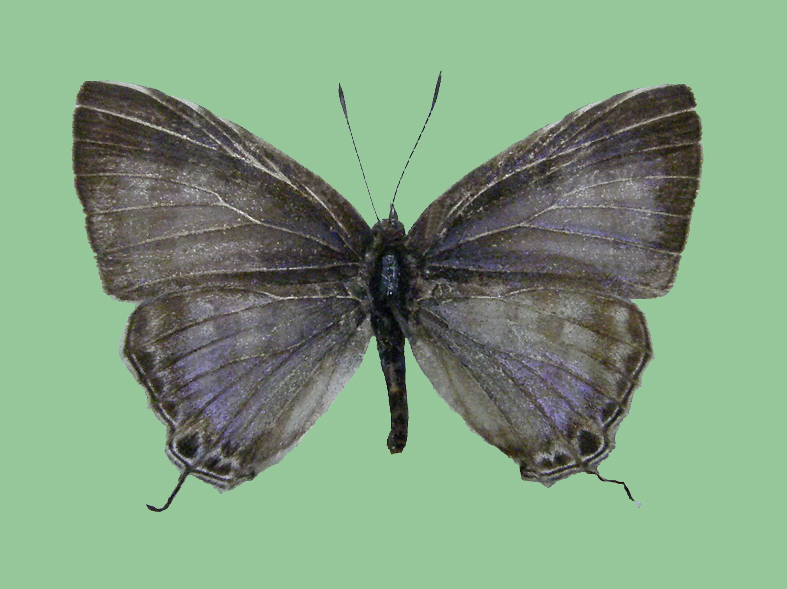
- Male H. a. palawensis
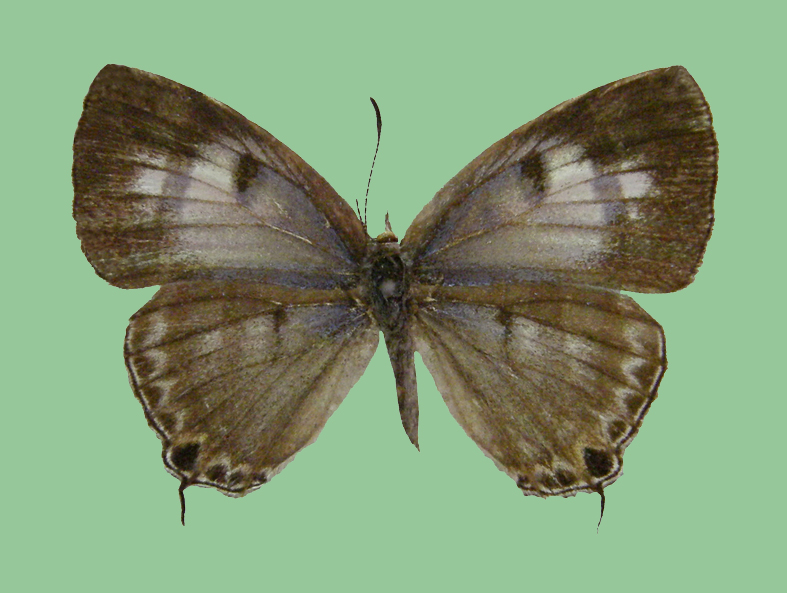
- Female H. a. palawensis

Scientific classification
- Domain: Eukaryota
- Kingdom: Animalia
- Phylum: Arthropoda
- Class: Insecta
- Order: Lepidoptera
- Family: Lycaenidae
- Genus: Hypothecla
- Species: H. astyla

Binomial name
- Hypothecla astyla (C. Felder & R. Felder, 1862)

Synonyms
- Hypolycaena astyla (C. Felder & R. Felder, 1862); Lycaena astyla Boisduval [unpublished name]; Hypolycaena mindanaensis Fruhstorfer, [1912]; Hypothecla astyla cebuensis M. & T. Okana, 1991; Hypolycaena tegea Fruhstorfer, [1912]

= Hypothecla astyla =

Species of butterfly

Hypothecla astyla is a butterfly in the family Lycaenidae first described by Cajetan Felder and Rudolf Felder in 1862. It is found on the Philippines.

== Subspecies ==
- H. a. astyla (Philippines: Luzon)
- H. a. mindanaensis (Fruhstorfer, [1912]) (Philippines: Mindanao)
- H. a. palawensis H. Hayashi, 1976 (Philippines: Palawan)
- H. a. tegea Fruhstorfer, [1912] (Philippines: Bazilan)
