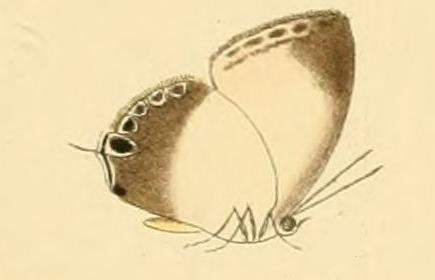

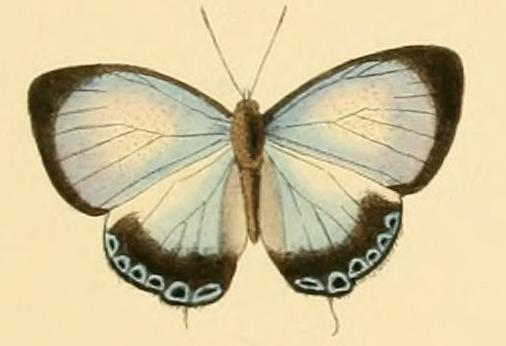

Scientific classification
- Kingdom: Animalia
- Phylum: Arthropoda
- Clade: Pancrustacea
- Class: Insecta
- Order: Lepidoptera
- Family: Lycaenidae
- Genus: Hypochlorosis
- Species: H. ancharia

Binomial name
- Hypochlorosis ancharia (Hewitson, 1869)

Synonyms
- Myrina ancharia Hewitson, 1869; Pseudonotis humboldti Druce, 1894

= Hypochlorosis ancharia =

Species of butterfly

Hypochlorosis ancharia is a butterfly in the family Lycaenidae. It is found on Waigeo in Indonesia, and in the Dampier Archipelago in the north of Australia.

== Description ==
Upperside. Male.—Cerulean blue. Anterior wing with the centre grey-white: the costal and outer margins dark brown, widest at the apex. Posterior wing with one tail: the costal margin broadly white: the outer margin dark brown, broad, with a submarginal seriesof black spots encircled with blue. Underside white. Anterior wing with the costal margin and apex rufous-brown: the outer margin with a series of white spots centred and bordered with brown. Posterior wing with the outer margin broadly rufous-brown: a submarginal series of conical brown spots bordered with white: the spot at the base of the tail large and black bordered with blue: the lobe black bordered above with blue. Female with the anterior wing white broadly bordered (except on the inner margin) with dark brown: the base and anal angle irrorated with blue. Posterior wing like that of the male, except that the white of the costal margin is broader: the underside does not differ from the male.

== Subspecies ==
- Hypochlorosis ancharia ancharia (Indonesia: Waigeo)
- Hypochlorosis ancharia tenebrosa Rothschild, 1915 (New Guinea: Dampier Island)
