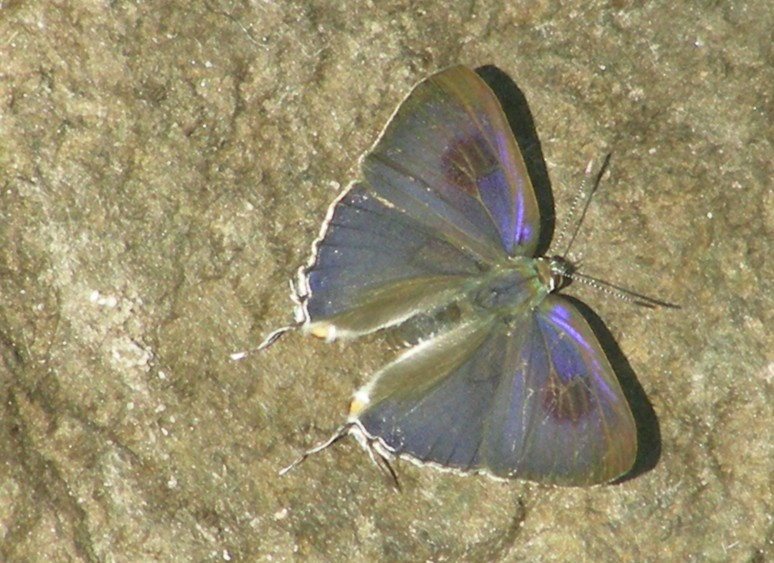
- Male common tit, Hypolycaena erylus

Scientific classification
- Kingdom: Animalia
- Phylum: Arthropoda
- Clade: Pancrustacea
- Class: Insecta
- Order: Lepidoptera
- Family: Lycaenidae
- Subfamily: Theclinae
- Tribe: Hypolycaenini; Swinhoe, 1910

Genera
- See text

= Hypolycaenini =

Tribe of butterflies

The Hypolycaenini are a small tribe of butterflies in the family Lycaenidae. It is alternatively treated as a subtribe, Hypolycaenina, of the Theclini.

== Genera ==
As not all Theclinae have been assigned to tribes, the following list of genera is preliminary:

- Hemiolaus
- Hypolycaena
- Chliaria
- Zeltus
- Leptomyrina
