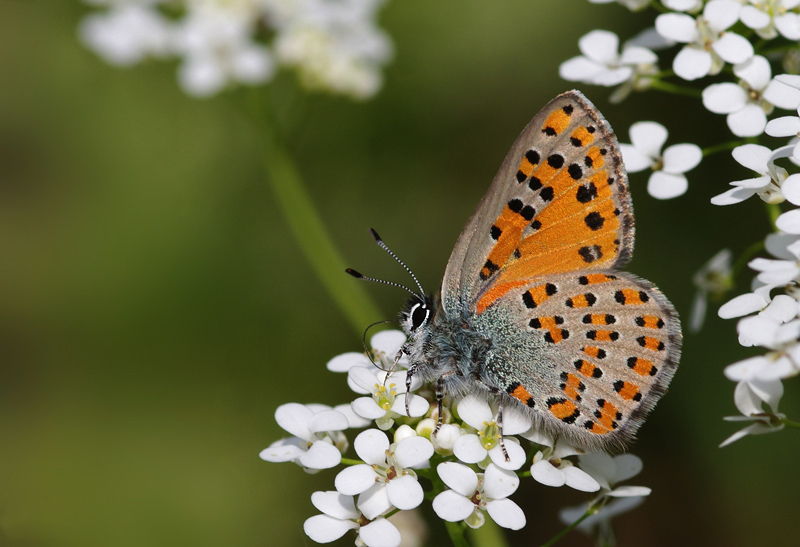
- Tomares nogelii in Turkey

Scientific classification
- Domain: Eukaryota
- Kingdom: Animalia
- Phylum: Arthropoda
- Class: Insecta
- Order: Lepidoptera
- Family: Lycaenidae
- Genus: Tomares
- Species: T. nogelii

Binomial name
- Tomares nogelii (Herrich-Schäffer, 1851)

= Tomares nogelii =

Species of butterfly

Tomares nogelii is a small butterfly found in the Palearctic (Ukraine, Romania, Syria, Lebanon, Israel, Palestine, Turkey to Armenia) that belongs to the blues family.

== Description from Seitz ==
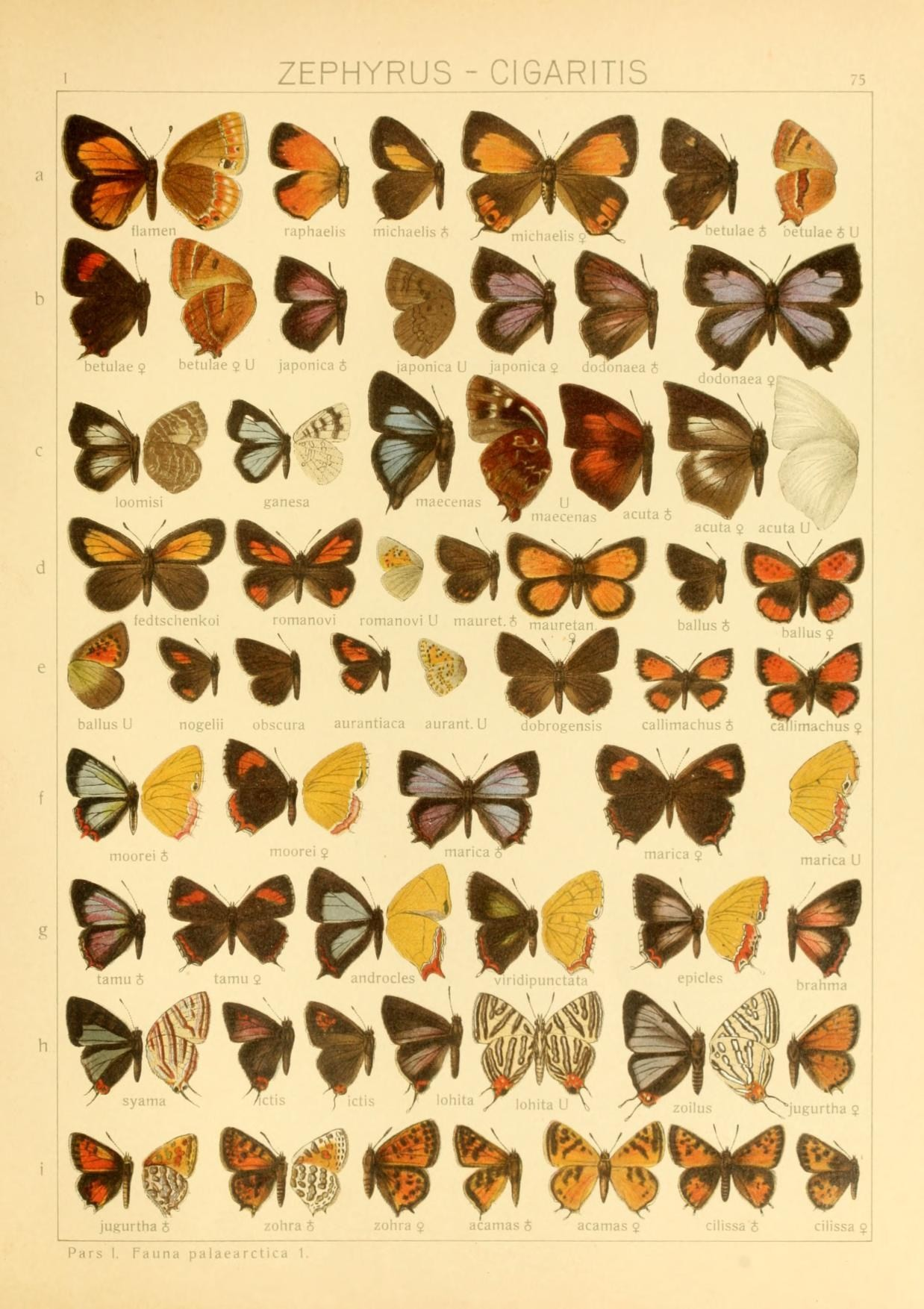
Tomares nogelii in Seitz 75 e

T. nogelii H.-Schaff. (= nogellii Lang) (75 e). The smallest species, recognizable by the hindwing beneath bluish grey ornamented with red macular bands, which are dotted with black at their edges. In the typical form, from Asia Minor and Turkey, the forewing bears a red discal patch and the hind wing a red transverse spot before the anal area. — In the larger obscura Ruhl (75 e) the upperside is uniformly black-brown, except for some vestiges of red-yellow before the distal margin of the hindwing; from the Taurus and Armenia. Transitions to this form occur almost everywhere among the name-typical race— aurantiaca Stgr. (75 e) has the red-yellow of the upperside so enlarged that the forewing is orange-red with black margins. Asia Minor, especially in the district of Angora; Syria. — nesimachus Oberth.[now subspecies] has even more red-yellow on the forewing, the black margin being interrupted by the fiery ground-colour or even reduced to marginal dots. Syria. — dobrogensis Car. [now subspecies] (75 e) is a very large form from Roumania, which considerably surpasses in size even the otherwise similar obscura; found on Astragalus ponticus, on which probably the larva feeds. — In May and June, not rare, but flying so low that it is difficult to follow the small insect with the eyes (Staudinger).

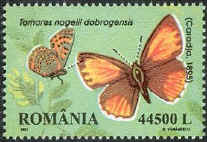
*Tomares nogelii dobrogensis on a postage stamp of Romania

== Subspecies ==
- Tomares nogelii dobrogensis (Caradja, 1895)
- Tomares nogelii nesimachus (Oberthür, 1893)
- Tomares nogelii obscura (Rühl, 1893)

== Etymology ==
The species name is given in honor of Stefan Nogel, a 19th-century entomologist who studied the insect fauna of Turkey and the Caucasus.

== See also ==
- List of butterflies of Europe
