= Syrmoptera mixtura =

Scientific classification
- Kingdom: Animalia
- Phylum: Arthropoda
- Class: Insecta
- Order: Lepidoptera
- Family: Lycaenidae
- Genus: Syrmoptera
- Species: S. mixtura

Binomial name
- Syrmoptera mixtura (Hulstaert, 1924)

Synonyms
- Oxylides mixtura Hulstaert, 1924

Species of butterfly

Syrmoptera mixtura is a butterfly in the family Lycaenidae. It is found in the Democratic Republic of the Congo.

== Images ==
External images from Royal Museum of Central Africa.
