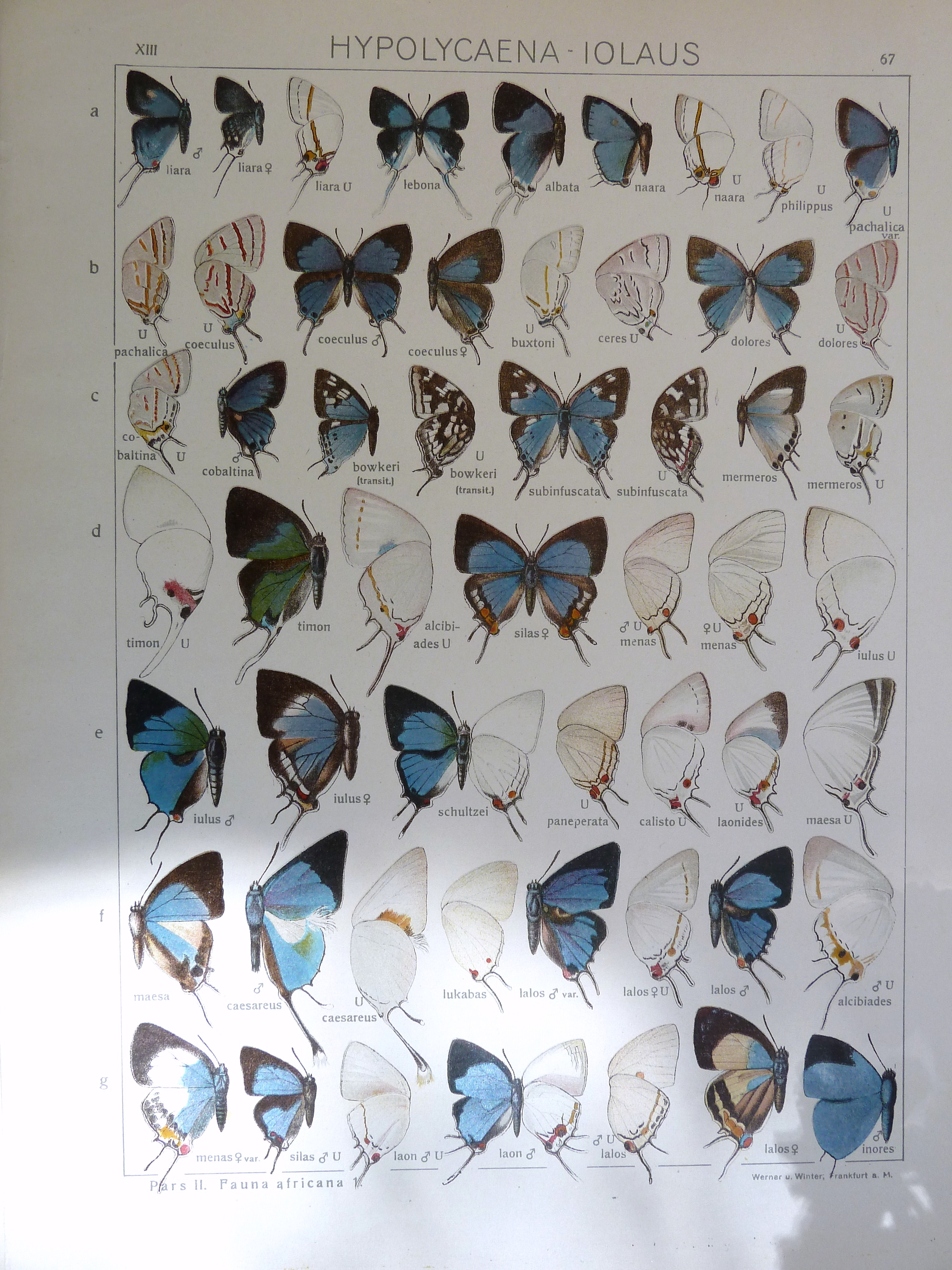
- Seitz Fauna Africana Taf67 (line b)

Scientific classification
- Kingdom: Animalia
- Phylum: Arthropoda
- Class: Insecta
- Order: Lepidoptera
- Family: Lycaenidae
- Genus: Hemiolaus
- Species: H. ceres

Binomial name
- Hemiolaus ceres (Hewitson, 1865)

Synonyms
- Myrina ceres Hewitson, 1865; Iolaus (Hemiolaus) ceres; Hypolycaena maryra mabillei Aurivillius, 1923

= Hemiolaus ceres =

Species of butterfly

Hemiolaus ceres is a butterfly in the family Lycaenidae. It is found on Madagascar. The habitat consists of forests.
