= Syrmoptera caritas =

Scientific classification
- Domain: Eukaryota
- Kingdom: Animalia
- Phylum: Arthropoda
- Class: Insecta
- Order: Lepidoptera
- Family: Lycaenidae
- Genus: Syrmoptera
- Species: S. caritas

Binomial name
- Syrmoptera caritas Libert, 2004

Species of butterfly

Syrmoptera caritas is a butterfly in the family Lycaenidae. It is found in the Central African Republic.
