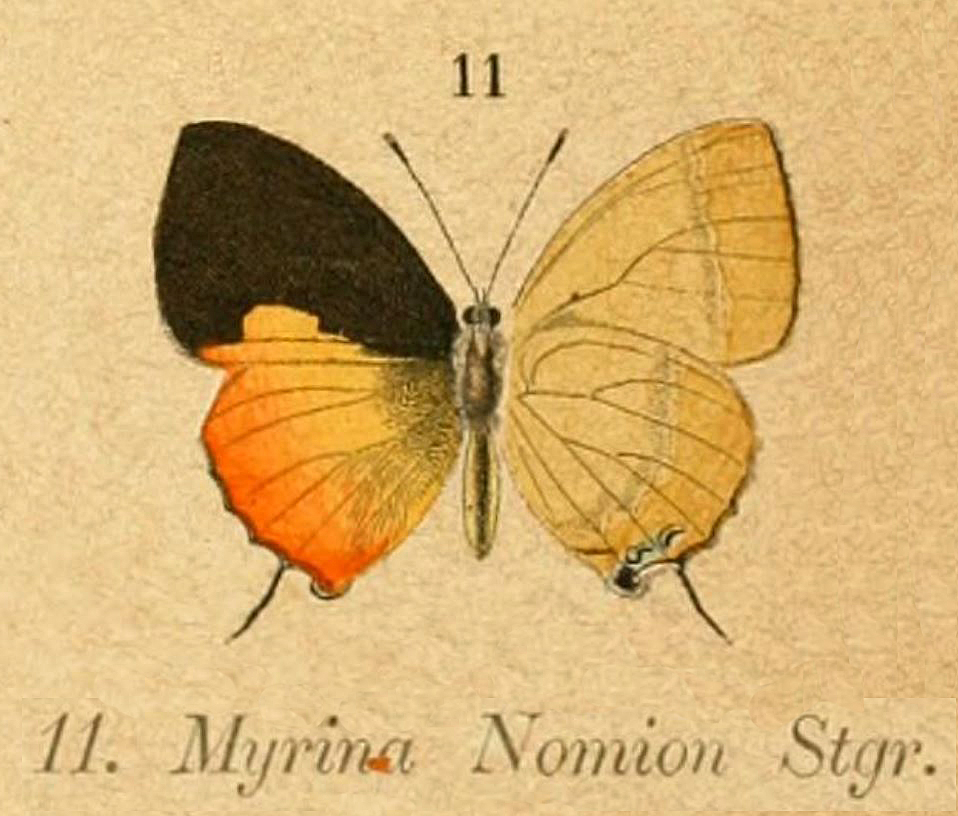

Scientific classification
- Domain: Eukaryota
- Kingdom: Animalia
- Phylum: Arthropoda
- Class: Insecta
- Order: Lepidoptera
- Family: Lycaenidae
- Genus: Hypomyrina
- Species: H. nomion

Binomial name
- Hypomyrina nomion (Staudinger, 1891)

Synonyms
- Myrina nomion Staudinger, 1891; Deudorix acares Karsch, 1893

= Hypomyrina nomion =

Species of butterfly

Hypomyrina nomion, the dark orange playboy, is a butterfly in the family Lycaenidae. It is found in Guinea-Bissau, Guinea, Sierra Leone, Ivory Coast, Ghana, Togo, Benin, southern Nigeria, Cameroon, the Central African Republic, southern Sudan and Uganda. The habitat consists of the transition zone between savanna and forest.
