= Itylos (butterfly) =

Scientific classification
- Kingdom: Animalia
- Phylum: Arthropoda
- Clade: Pancrustacea
- Class: Insecta
- Order: Lepidoptera
- Family: Lycaenidae
- Subfamily: Polyommatinae
- Tribe: Polyommatini
- Genus: Itylos; Draudt in Seitz, 1921

Synonyms
- Ithylos Forster, 1955 (lapsus); Ityloides Balletto, 1993; Parachilades Nabokov, 1945

Butterfly genus in family Lycaenidae

Itylos is a Neotropical butterfly genus in the family Lycaenidae. There has been confusion regarding the correct name; the present genus was discussed in 1945 by the famous lepidopterologist and author Vladimir Nabokov as Parachilades but had been described already in 1921. Nabokov used the name Itylos for the genus which nowadays is known as Madeleinea.

== Species ==
- Itylos fumosus (Balletto, 1993) Peru
- Itylos mashenka Bálint, 1993 – named after Nabokov's first novel Mashen'ka (Mary)
- Itylos mira Bálint & Lamas, 1999 Peru
- Itylos pasco Bálint & Lamas, 1994 Peru
- Itylos pnin Bálint, 1993Peru
- Itylos titicaca (Weymer, 1890) Peru, Bolivia
