= Hypothecla =

Scientific classification
- Domain: Eukaryota
- Kingdom: Animalia
- Phylum: Arthropoda
- Class: Insecta
- Order: Lepidoptera
- Family: Lycaenidae
- Subfamily: Theclinae
- Genus: Hypothecla; Semper, 1890

Butterfly genus in family Lycaenidae

Hypothecla is a genus of butterflies in the family Lycaenidae. The genus was erected by Georg Semper in 1890.

== Species ==
- Hypothecla astyla (C. Felder & R. Felder, 1862) Philippines
- Hypothecla honos de Nicéville, 1898 Sulawesi
