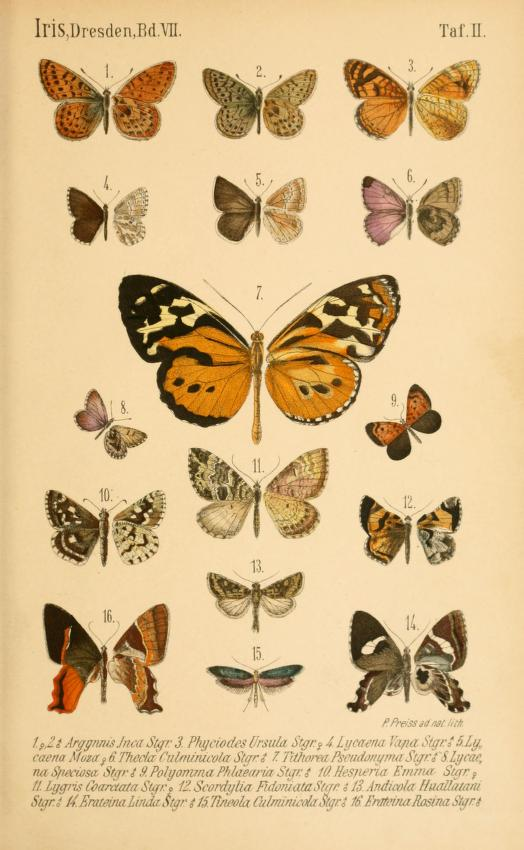
- Madeleinea moza Fig. 5

Scientific classification
- Kingdom: Animalia
- Phylum: Arthropoda
- Clade: Pancrustacea
- Class: Insecta
- Order: Lepidoptera
- Family: Lycaenidae
- Subfamily: Polyommatinae
- Tribe: Polyommatini
- Genus: Madeleinea; Bálint, 1993

Synonyms
- Itylos Nabokov, 1945 (non Draudt, 1921: preoccupied); Nivalis Balletto, 1993

= Madeleinea =

Butterfly genus in family Lycaenidae

Madeleinea is a butterfly genus in the family Lycaenidae. These Andean butterflies are very interesting from a taxonomic standpoint.

This genus was discussed by famous author and lepidopterologist Vladimir Nabokov in 1945. However, he used the name Itylos, which actually refers to a closely related but distinct genus described in 1921. That was not known in his time however, as the relationships of the butterflies discussed by Nabokov were only resolved in 1993. In any case, Nivalis was proposed as a replacement name by Emilio Balletto but for technical reasons turned out to be unavailable. Zsolt Bálint subsequently established the currently-valid name.

The latter researcher, in cooperation with Kurt Johnson, since then described many taxa new to science. To honor the contributions of Nabokov to entomology - chiefly concerning Lycaenidae -, these were often given names referring to the novels of Nabokov, or characters therein.

== Selected species ==
At least one but probably more undescribed species are known to exist.

- Madeleinea ardisensis Bálint & Lamas, 1996 – named after Ardis Hall, a place in Ada or Ardor: A Family Chronicle.
- Madeleinea bella Bálint & Lamas, 1996
- Madeleinea cobaltana Bálint & Lamas, 1994 – named after Kobalt, a mountain resort in Pale Fire
- Madeleinea colca Bálint & Lamas, 1996
- Madeleinea gradoslamasi Bálint & Johnson, 1997
- Madeleinea huascarana Bálint & Lamas, 1994
- Madeleinea koa (Druce, 1896)
- Madeleinea lea Benyamini, Bálint & Johnson, 1995
- Madeleinea lolita Bálint, 1993 – named after Dolores Haze, nicknamed "Lolita", and the protagonist of the novel by the same title.
- Madeleinea ludicra (Weymer, 1890)
- Madeleinea malvasa Bálint & Pyrcz, [2000]
- Madeleinea moza (Staudinger, [1894])
- Madeleinea nodo Bálint & Johnson, 1995 – named after Nodo, half-brother of Odon in Pale Fire.
- Madeleinea odon Bálint & Johnson, 1995 – named after Odon, half-brother of Nodo in Pale Fire.
- Madeleinea pacis (Draudt, 1921)
- Madeleinea pelorias (Weymer, 1890)
- Madeleinea sigal Benyamini, Bálint & Johnson, 1995
- Madeleinea tintarrona Bálint & Johnson, 1995 – named after Tintarron, a brand of deep blue glass in Pale Fire
- Madeleinea vokoban Bálint & Johnson, 1995 – the specific name is "Nabokov" read backwards
