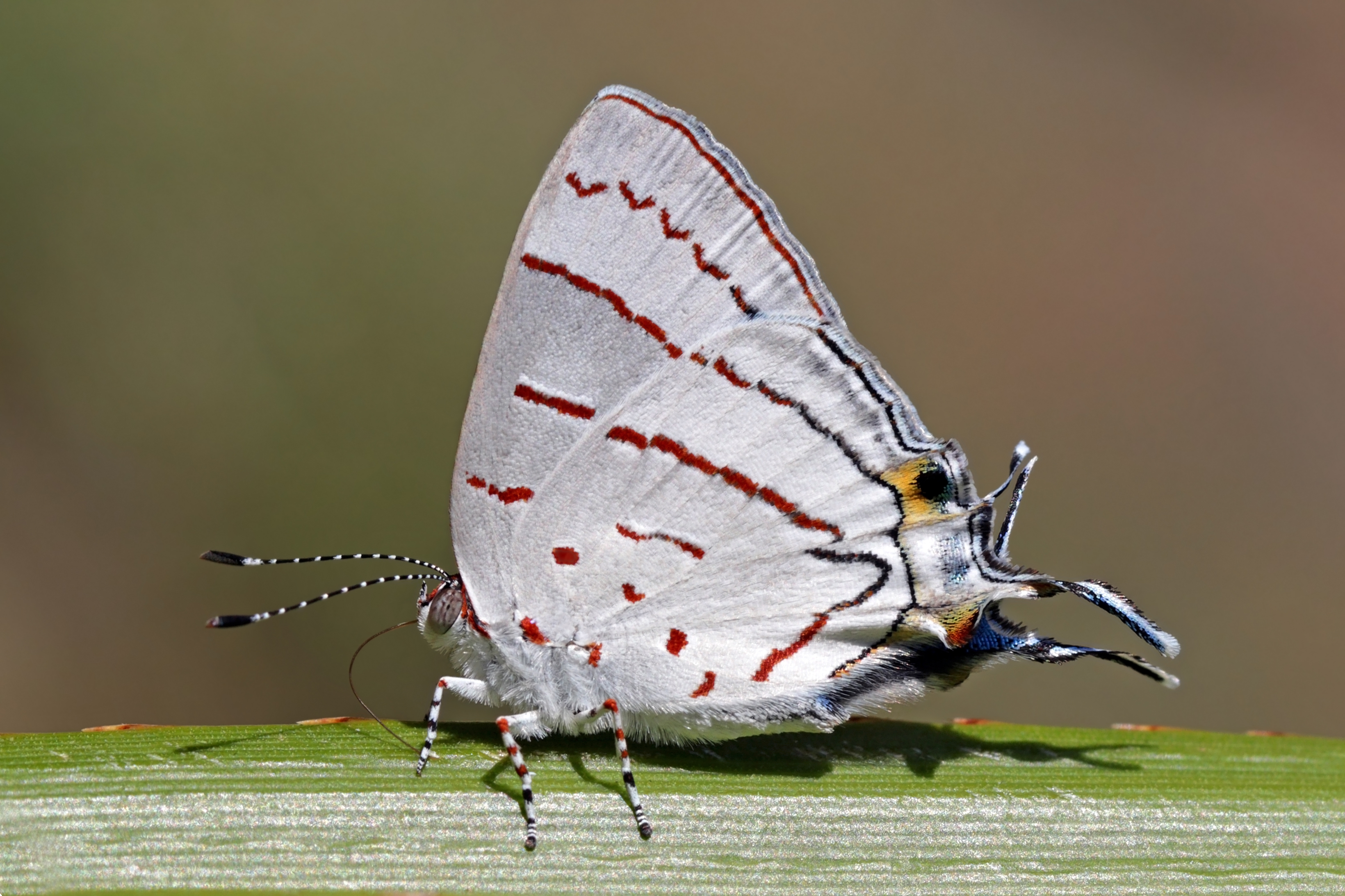
- Hemiolaus cobaltina

Scientific classification
- Kingdom: Animalia
- Phylum: Arthropoda
- Class: Insecta
- Order: Lepidoptera
- Family: Lycaenidae
- Tribe: Hypolycaenini
- Genus: Hemiolaus; Aurivillius, [1922]

= Hemiolaus =

Butterfly genus in family Lycaenidae

Hemiolaus is a butterfly genus in the family Lycaenidae.

== Species ==
- Hemiolaus caeculus (Hopffer, 1855)
- Hemiolaus ceres (Hewitson, 1865)
- Hemiolaus cobaltina (Aurivillius, 1899)
- Hemiolaus maryra (Mabille, [1887])
