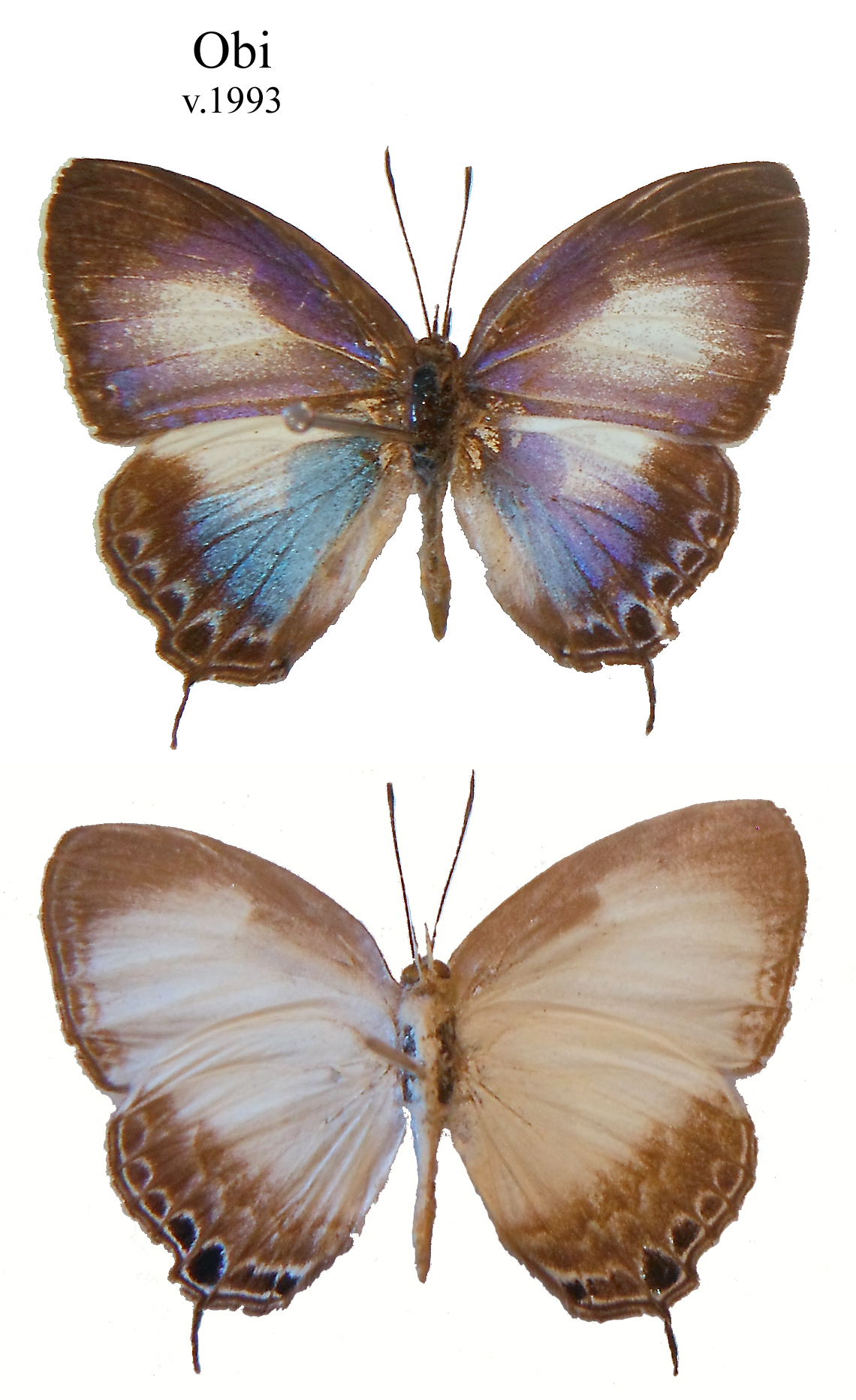
- Hypochlorosis lorquinii

Scientific classification
- Kingdom: Animalia
- Phylum: Arthropoda
- Class: Insecta
- Order: Lepidoptera
- Family: Lycaenidae
- Subfamily: Theclinae
- Genus: Hypochlorosis; Röber, [1892]

Synonyms
- Pseudonotis Druce, 1894

= Hypochlorosis =

Butterfly genus in family Lycaenidae

Hypochlorosis is a genus of butterflies in the family Lycaenidae. The species of this genus are found on New Guinea and in the Moluccas in the Australasian realm.

== Species ==
- Hypochlorosis ancharia (Hewitson, 1869)
- Hypochlorosis antipha (Hewitson, 1869)
- Hypochlorosis lorquinii (C. Felder & R. Felder, 1865)
