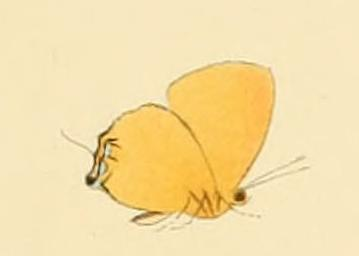
- Hypomyrina nomenia (Hewitson, 1874).

Scientific classification
- Domain: Eukaryota
- Kingdom: Animalia
- Phylum: Arthropoda
- Class: Insecta
- Order: Lepidoptera
- Family: Lycaenidae
- Tribe: Deudorigini
- Genus: Hypomyrina; H. H. Druce, 1891

= Hypomyrina =

Butterfly genus in family Lycaenidae

Hypomyrina is an Afrotropical genus of butterflies in the family Lycaenidae. The genus was erected by Hamilton Herbert Druce in 1891.

== Species ==
- Hypomyrina fournierae (Gabriel, 1939)
- Hypomyrina mimetica (Libert, 2004)
- Hypomyrina nomenia (Hewitson, 1874)
- Hypomyrina nomion (Staudinger, 1891)
