= Gigantorubra =

Scientific classification (disputed)
- Domain: Eukaryota
- Kingdom: Animalia
- Phylum: Arthropoda
- Class: Insecta
- Order: Lepidoptera
- Family: Lycaenidae
- Genus: Gigantorubra; Johnson, 1993

Type species
- Thecla collucia Hewitson, 1877

Butterfly genus in family Lycaenidae

Gigantorubra is a genus of butterflies in the family Lycaenidae. It has an uncertain status; some sources list it as a synonym of Lamprospilus following Duarte & Robbins (2010).
