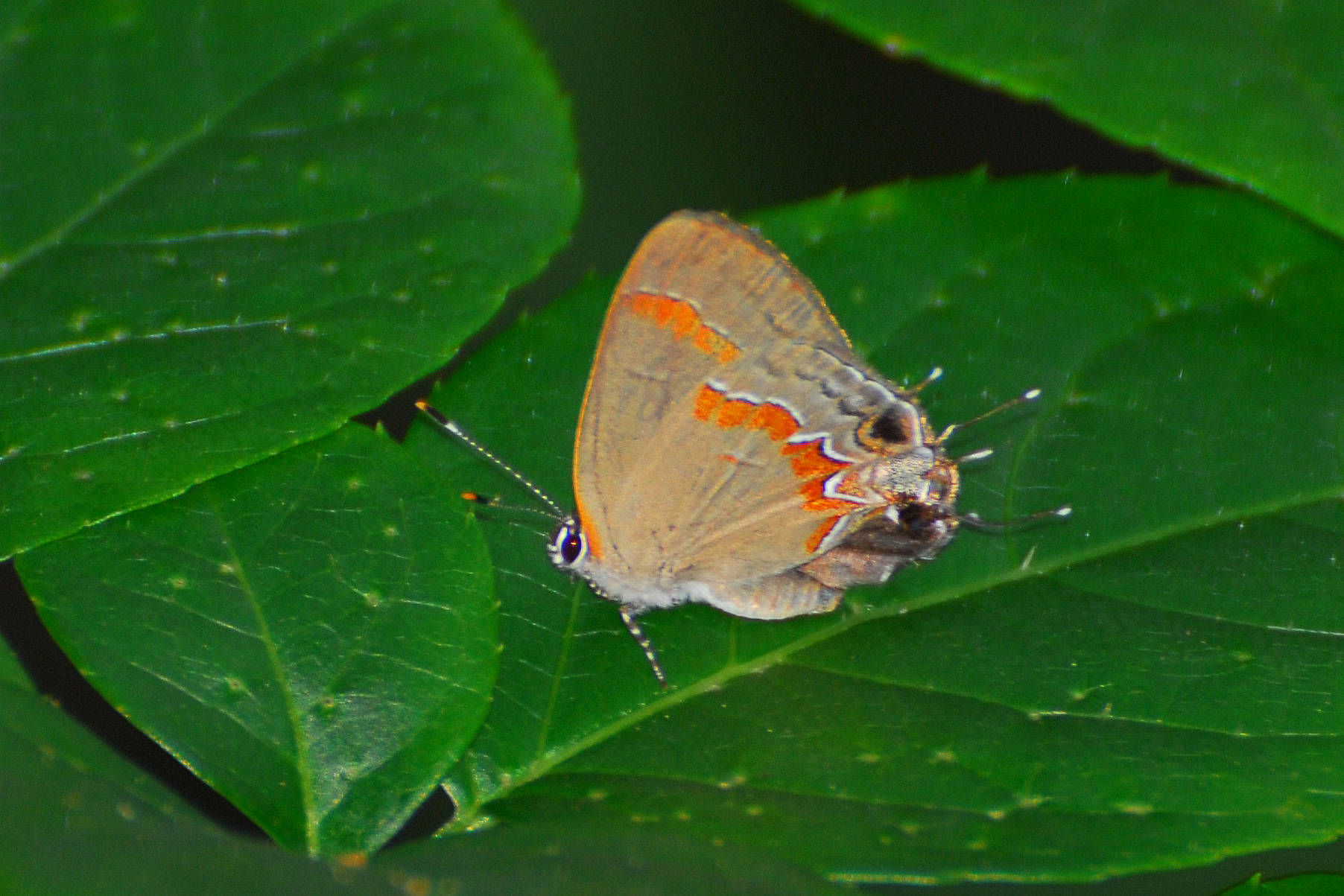
- Red-banded hairstreak

Scientific classification
- Kingdom: Animalia
- Phylum: Arthropoda
- Clade: Pancrustacea
- Class: Insecta
- Order: Lepidoptera
- Superfamily: Papilionoidea
- Family: Lycaenidae
- Subfamily: Theclinae; Swainson, 1831

Tribes
- See text

= Theclinae =

Subfamily of butterflies

The subfamily Theclinae is a group of butterflies, often referred to as hairstreaks, with some species instead known as elfins or by other names. The group is part of the family Lycaenidae, the "gossamer-winged butterflies". There are many tropical species as well as a number found in the Americas. Tropical hairstreaks often have iridescent blue coloration above, caused by reflected light from the structure of the wing scales rather than by pigment. Hairstreaks from North America are commonly brown above. Few Theclinae are migratory. Members of this group are described as 'thecline'.

== Family characteristics ==
Morphology: Members of the Lycaenidae family, including Theclinae, typically possess smooth or hairy eyes bordered by white scales. The labial palps are forward-projecting or slightly upturned, and the antennae are approximately half the length of the forewing, ending in elongated clubs. Both sexes have fully functional legs, although male forelegs are often reduced compared to females. Forewing venation includes 10 to 11 veins, with vein 8 often absent and vein 9 sometimes missing. The wing cell is narrower than in most other butterfly families. Distinct sexual dimorphism is common, and the undersides of the wings frequently feature unique spot patterns, contrasting sharply with the often iridescent uppersides. Some genera have a short hindwing tail at vein 2, contributing to their mimicry strategy.

=== Egg structure and development ===
Eggs are disc-shaped, featuring a finely reticulated surface of ribs and hollows. Recent studies, such as those examining species from the Russian Far East, reveal that the morphology of Theclinae eggs varies between genera and can aid in taxonomic classification. These structural differences offer insights into evolutionary relationships and are an emerging focus of research in Theclinae systematics.

=== Life cycle and behavior ===
Larvae: Caterpillars are typically woodlouse-shaped, yellow-green, and covered in short, downy hairs. They bear dark green longitudinal stripes and oblique bars, turning reddish-brown before pupation. The larvae often feed on leaves or seed pods and can retract their heads into their bodies while feeding.

Pupation: Pupae are dark brown and cryptic, often camouflaged in leaf litter or among vegetation. Pupation may occur on or near the host plant, either attached by a silken girdle and cremaster or lying freely on or beneath the soil surface. The pupal stage usually lasts around ten days during summer months.

Adult Behavior: Theclinae butterflies are known for the “false head” defense mechanism, in which tails and eye-like patterns on the hindwings mimic a head, diverting attacks from predators such as birds and spiders. Adults are typically seen in forest clearings or along woodland edges, especially in oak-dominated habitats. Species like the White M Hairstreak (Parrhasius m-album) may produce multiple generations per year—three in the northern U.S. and up to four in Florida—with flight periods from February through October.

=== Ant associations (myrmecophily) ===
A hallmark of Theclinae biology is their relationship with ants. Many larvae possess a specialized dorsal gland (the Newcomer's gland) on the seventh abdominal segment, which secretes a sugary, amino acid-rich fluid. This secretion attracts ants, which in turn protect the caterpillars from predators and parasitoids. In some highly specialized species, such as the Large Blue (Maculinea arion), larvae are integrated into ant colonies, feeding on ant brood and pupating within the nest. These complex interspecies relationships exemplify mutualism and parasitism within a single evolutionary framework.

=== Geographic distribution and habitat ===
Theclinae are found on all continents except Antarctica, with the highest diversity in the Neotropics and Southeast Asia. European hairstreaks, documented in sources like UK Butterflies, typically inhabit sunny woodland edges, meadows, and scrublands. Their preferred environments vary by species, but they generally favor habitats that support their host plants and ant partners.

== Systematics ==
The systematics and phylogeny of the numerous Theclinae has not reached a robust consensus yet. The arrangement presented here is based on Savela (2007), but be aware that it is probably oversplit and several tribes may not be valid. Nonetheless, the tribes as listed here generally seem to represent monophyletic lineages, but whether this is indeed so and whether these are distinct enough to warrant this level of separation remains to be resolved.

The former tribe Aphnaeini has now been given subfamily status (see Aphnaeinae).

=== Tribes ===
The subfamily includes the following tribes:

- Amblypodiini
- Arhopalini
- Catapaecilmatini
- Cheritrini
- Deudorigini
- Eumaeini
- Horagini
- Hypolycaenini
- Hypotheclini
- Iolaini
- Loxurini
- Luciini
- Oxylidini
- Remelanini
- Theclini
- Tomarini
- Zesiini

=== Genera of incertae sedis ===
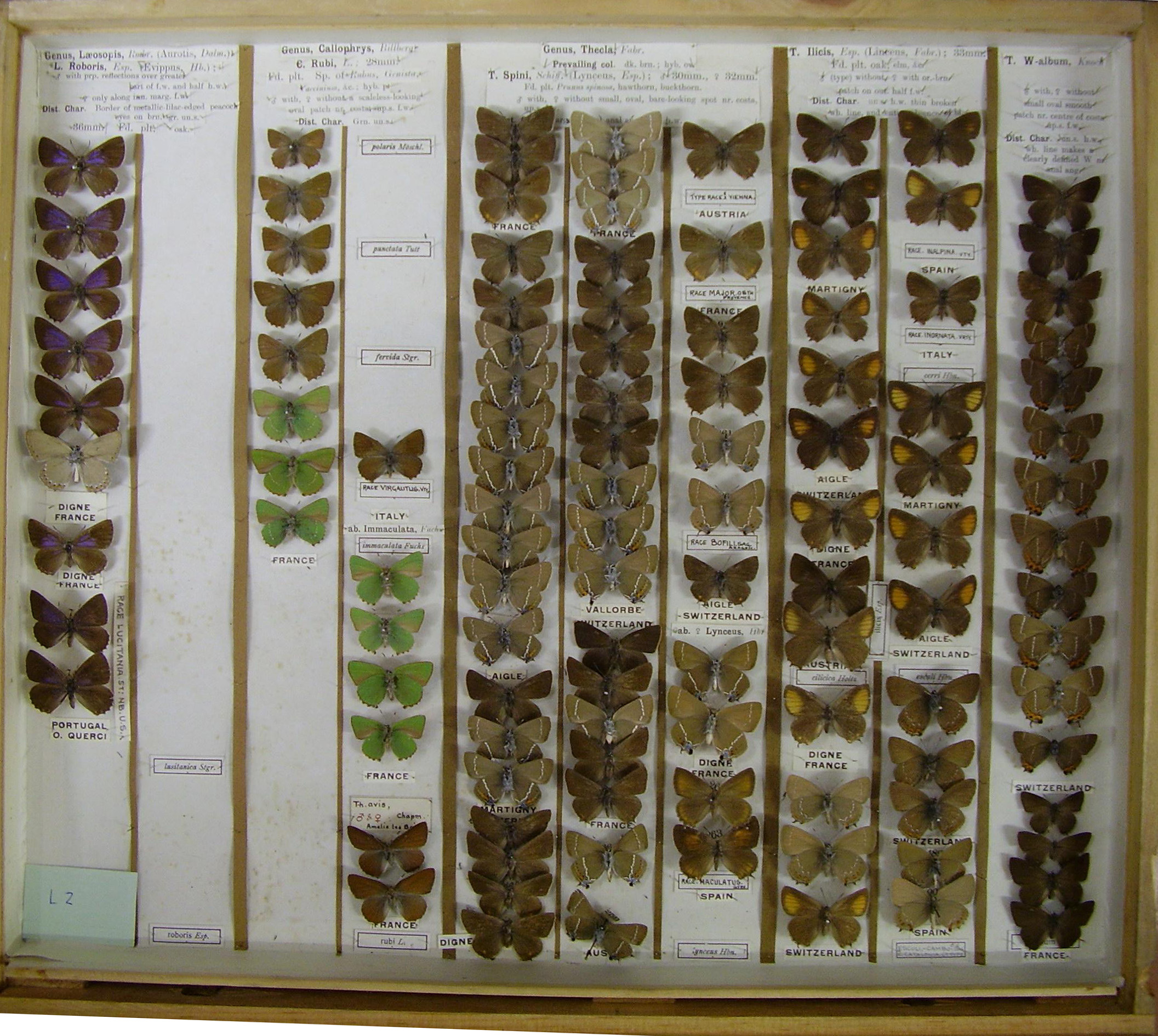
Museum drawer of West Palaearctic Theclinae.

The following genera have not yet been assigned to a tribe:

- Bithys
- Gigantorubra
- Macusia
- Mercedes
- Orcya
- Pamela
- Parachilades
- Pirhites
- Serratofalca
- Terra
- Thaumaina
