= List of lycaenid genera: K =

The large butterfly family Lycaenidae contains the following genera starting with the letter K:

- Keraunogramma
- Kolana
- Kretania
