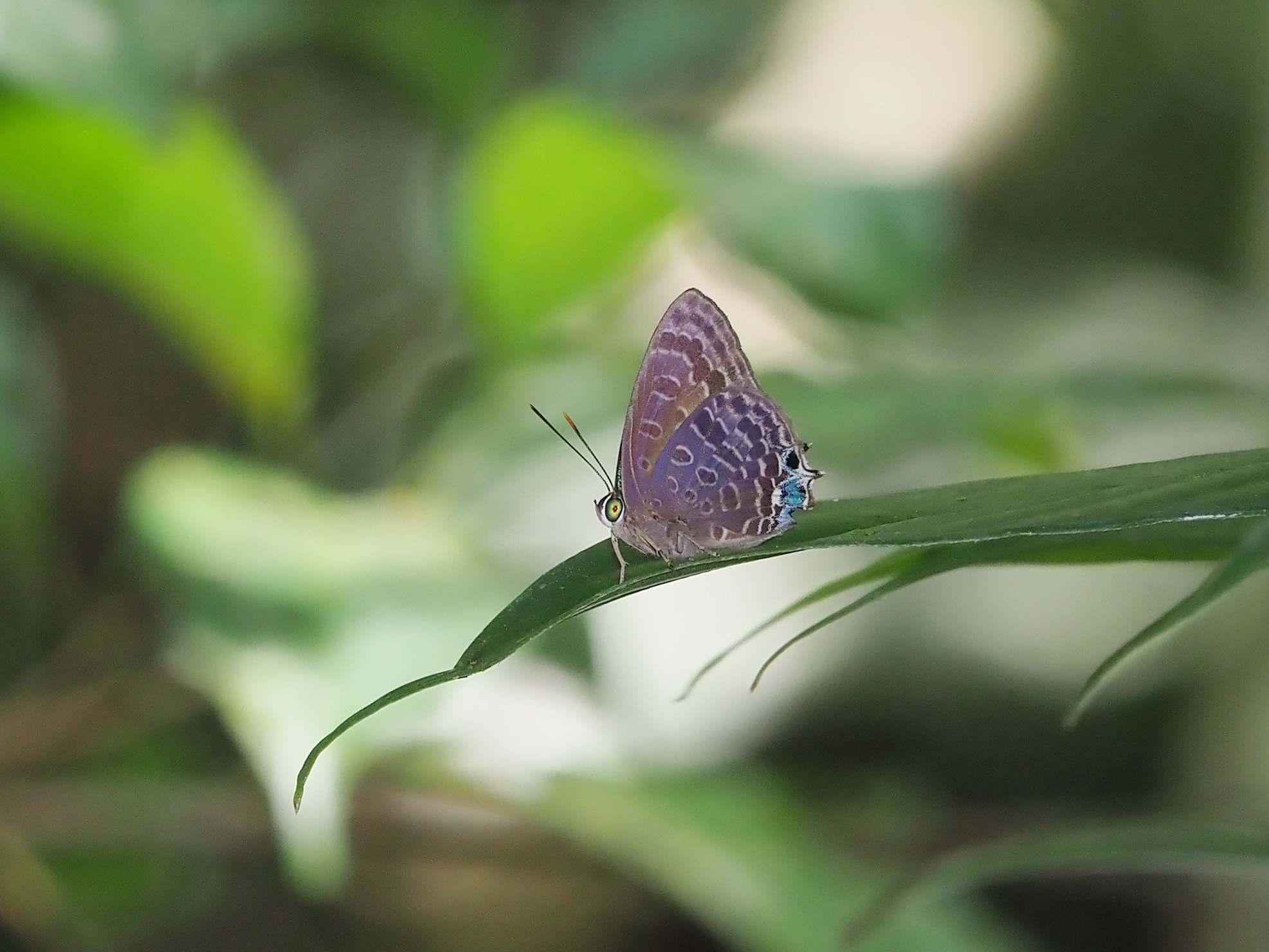

Scientific classification
- Kingdom: Animalia
- Phylum: Arthropoda
- Class: Insecta
- Order: Lepidoptera
- Family: Lycaenidae
- Subfamily: Theclinae
- Tribe: Arhopalini
- Genus: Arhopala
- Species: A. stinga

Binomial name
- Arhopala stinga (Evans, 1957)

Synonyms
- Aurea stinga

= Arhopala stinga =

Species of butterfly

Arhopala stinga is a butterfly in the family Lycaenidae. It was described by William Harry Evans in 1957. It is found in Johor, Malaysia.

== Description ==
It is similar to Arhopala trogon and Arhopala aurea but the border is broader and there is no basal bluish reflection.
