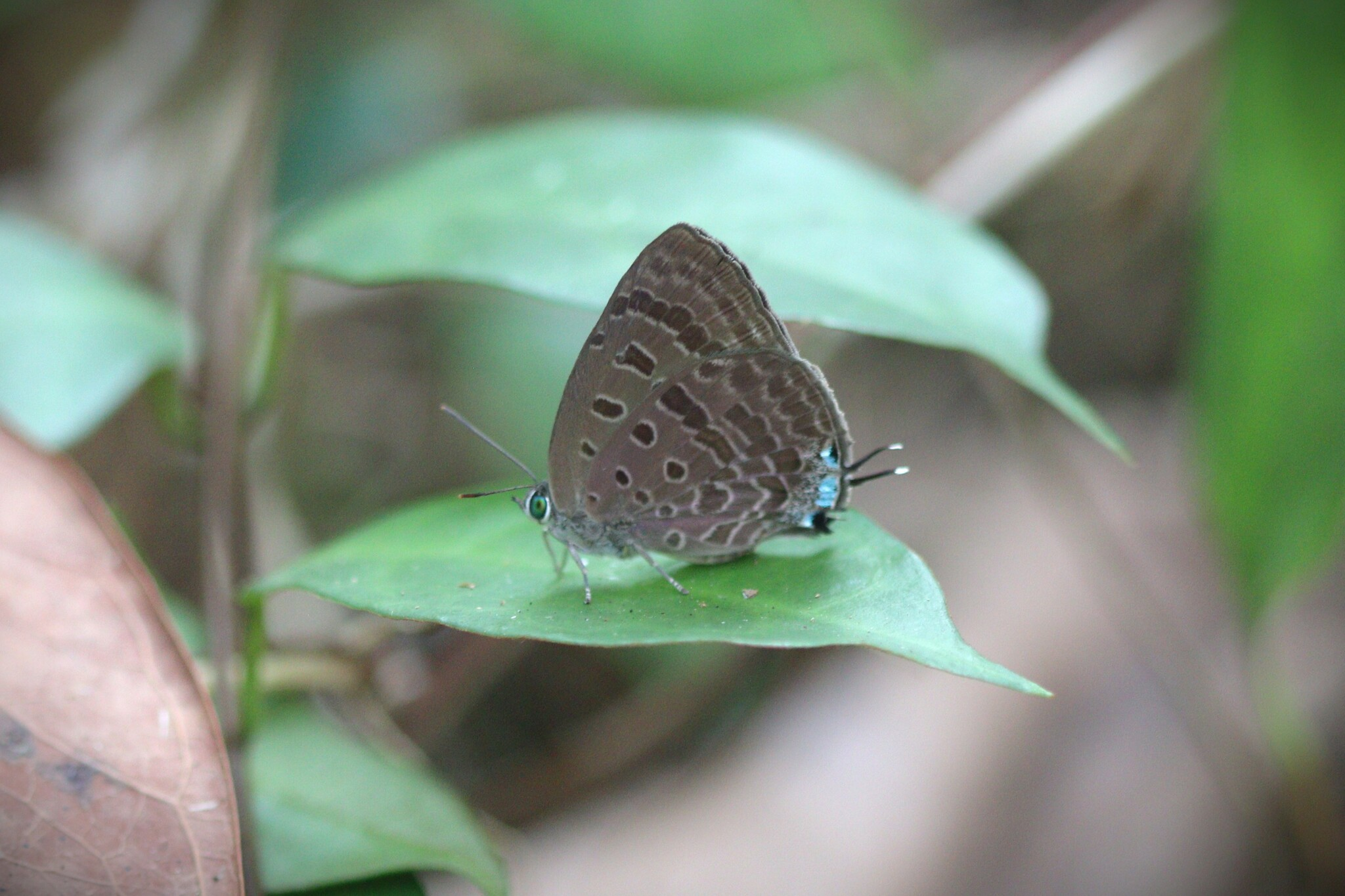

Scientific classification
- Domain: Eukaryota
- Kingdom: Animalia
- Phylum: Arthropoda
- Class: Insecta
- Order: Lepidoptera
- Family: Lycaenidae
- Subfamily: Theclinae
- Tribe: Arhopalini
- Genus: Arhopala
- Species: A. aurelia

Binomial name
- Arhopala aurelia Evans, 1925

Synonyms
- Narathura aurelia

= Arhopala aurelia =

Species of butterfly

Arhopala aurelia is a butterfly in the family Lycaenidae. It was discovered by William Harry Evans in 1925. It is found throughout Assam and South-east Asia. This species is monotypic.

== Description ==
The upper side is glazed purple, the black border is narrower, and the wings are more pointed than most of the Arhopala butterflies. Its wingspan is 35-38 mm.
