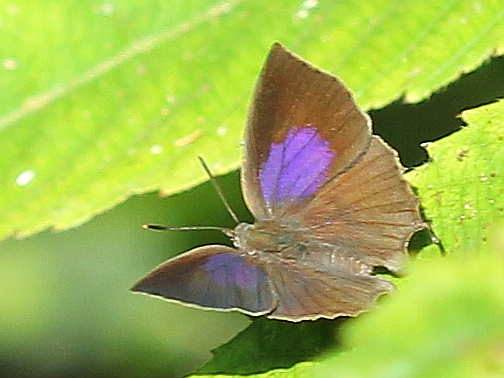

Scientific classification
- Kingdom: Animalia
- Phylum: Arthropoda
- Clade: Pancrustacea
- Class: Insecta
- Order: Lepidoptera
- Family: Lycaenidae
- Tribe: Arhopalini
- Genus: Surendra; Moore, [1879]

= Surendra (butterfly) =

Butterfly genus in family Lycaenidae

Surendra is a genus of butterflies in the family Lycaenidae. It belongs to the subfamily Theclinae often called hairstreaks. It is often grouped into the tribe Arhopalini along with its sister genera Arhopala, Flos and Semanga. The genus is sometimes known by the common name acacia blues in reflection of the host plant of the larvae.

== Species ==
- Surendra quercetorum (Moore, 1857)
- Surendra vivarna (Horsfield, 1829)
- Surendra florimel Doherty, 1889
- Surendra manilana (C. & R. Felder, 1862) Philippines

== Range ==
The species resides in Sri Lanka, India, China, Indochina, Malay Peninsula, Sumatra, Java, Bali, Borneo, Philippines and Sulawesi.
