= Arhopala alkisthenes =

Scientific classification
- Kingdom: Animalia
- Phylum: Arthropoda
- Class: Insecta
- Order: Lepidoptera
- Family: Lycaenidae
- Subfamily: Theclinae
- Tribe: Arhopalini
- Genus: Arhopala
- Species: A. alkisthenes

Binomial name
- Arhopala alkisthenes Fruhstorfer, 1914

Synonyms
- Narathura alkisthenes

Species of butterfly

Arhopala alkisthenes is a species of butterfly in the family Lycaenidae. It was discovered by Hans Fruhstorfer in 1914. It is found in New Guinea.

== Description ==
The male has rounder wing shape than other Arhopala butterflies. The female is darker violet than the male. The underside for both sexes is light grey brown.
