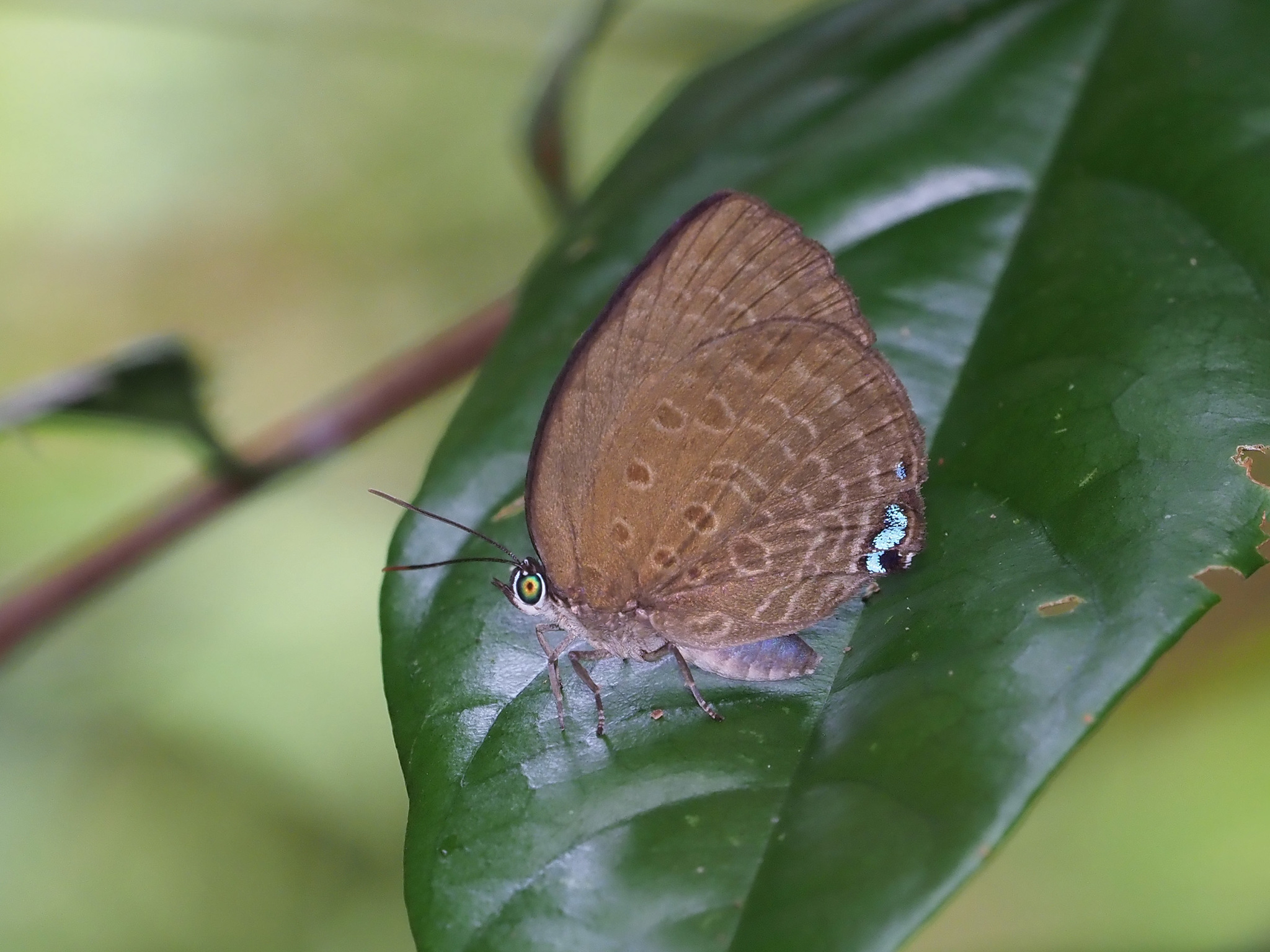

Scientific classification
- Kingdom: Animalia
- Phylum: Arthropoda
- Clade: Pancrustacea
- Class: Insecta
- Order: Lepidoptera
- Family: Lycaenidae
- Subfamily: Theclinae
- Tribe: Arhopalini
- Genus: Arhopala
- Species: A. norda

Binomial name
- Arhopala norda Evans, 1957

Synonyms
- Narathura major norda

= Arhopala norda =

Species of butterfly

Arhopala norda, the Langkawi yellow oakblue is a butterfly in the family Lycaenidae. It was discovered by William Harry Evans in 1957. It is found in West Malaysia and Thailand.

== Description ==
This species is rather similar to Arhopala major, but is darker and has broader border. The most obvious difference between the two species is that norda has a tiny white spot on space 1a near the cilia.

== Subspecies ==
Two subspecies are recognized:

- Arhopala norda norda (Evans, 1941)
- Arhopala norda ronda (Eliot, 1992)
