= Arhopala tindongani =

Scientific classification
- Kingdom: Animalia
- Phylum: Arthropoda
- Class: Insecta
- Order: Lepidoptera
- Family: Lycaenidae
- Subfamily: Theclinae
- Tribe: Arhopalini
- Genus: Arhopala
- Species: A. tindongani

Binomial name
- Arhopala tindongani Nuyda & Takanami, 1990

Species of butterfly

Arhopala tindongani is a butterfly in the family Lycaenidae. It was discovered by Justin Nuyda and Yusuke Takanami in 1990. It is found in Luzon. This species is monotypic.
