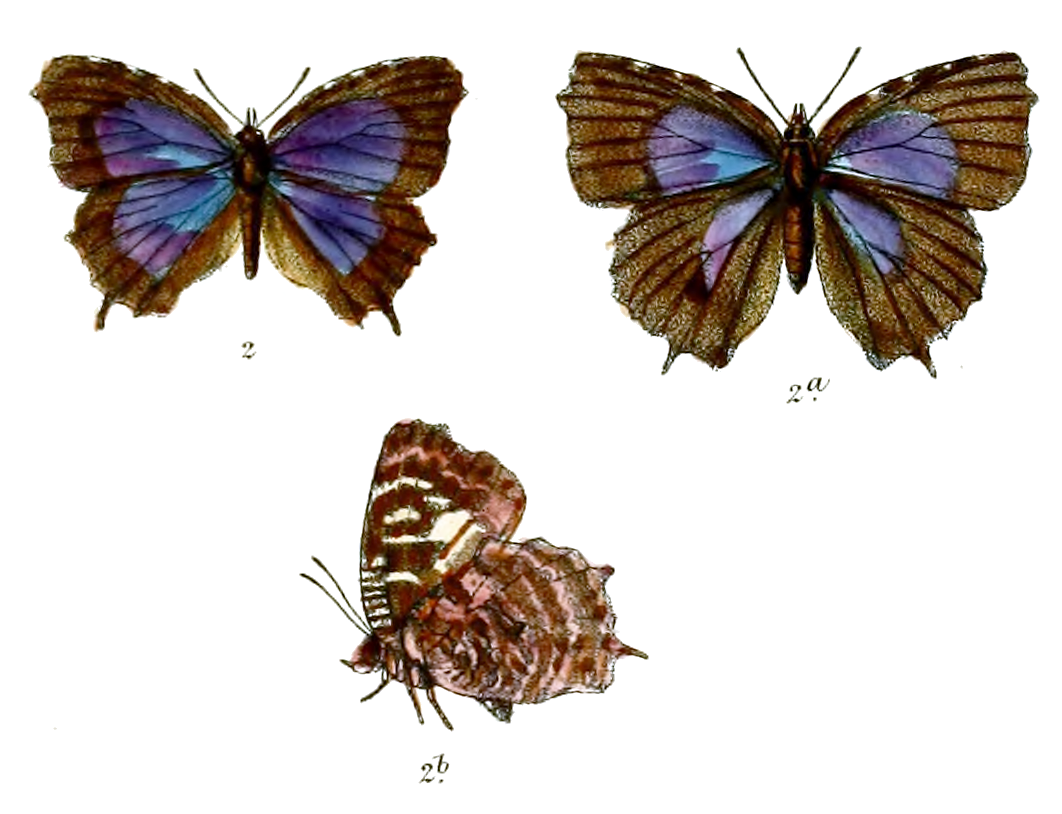

Scientific classification
- Kingdom: Animalia
- Phylum: Arthropoda
- Clade: Pancrustacea
- Class: Insecta
- Order: Lepidoptera
- Family: Lycaenidae
- Subfamily: Theclinae
- Tribe: Arhopalini
- Genus: Apporasa; Moore, 1884
- Species: A. atkinsoni

Binomial name
- Apporasa atkinsoni (Hewitson, 1869)

Synonyms
- Mahathala atkinsoni Bethune-Baker, 1903

= Apporasa =

Monotypic butterfly genus in family Lycaenidae

Apporasa is a genus of butterflies in the family Lycaenidae, known as the blues. The genus is monotypic containing only Apporasa atkinsoni, the crenulate oakblue. It is found in the Indomalayan realm.

== Description ==
The following description is taken from Charles Thomas Bingham's Fauna of British India, Butterflies, vol 2, (1907).

=== Male ===
Upperside, forewings and hindwings: medially and obliquely crossed by a very broad pure white band that is broadly edged on its inner and outer margins by dark blue and does not extend on the forewing above vein 6, just above vein 3 it projects outwards for a short distance whence the inner margin of its dark blue edging is carried obliquely to vein 6; the extreme bases of the wings black; the costal margin of the fore and the terminal margins of both forewings and hindwings broadly black; on both wings a light iridescent blue suffusion from base outwards. Underside: snow white. Forewings and hindwings: the following jet-black markings: Forewing: two broad more or less parallel streaks from base extended obliquely to the costa, the outer of the two apically curved and on the costa coalescent with the inner streak; costal margin very narrowly edged with black; an anterior, postdiscal, outwardly oblique, short bar, slightly clavate (club shaped) posteriorly, extends between the costa and vein 5; opposing this there is between the dorsum and vein 3 a similar but erect and apically non-clavate bar; beyond these there is an inner and outer transverse complete subterminal series of spots followed by an anteciliary slender black line; the spots of the inner subterminal series quadrate, of the outer linear, the posterior two of the former very large; lastly, a single detached postdiscal spot in interspace 3 very close to the inner subterminal line of spots. Hindwing: a curved short basal band not extended to the costa, a spot touching it in the middle on the outer side and a discal transverse band twice widely interrupted, the middle portion shifted outwards, the lower portion with a spot on its outer margin joined to it; subterminal and terminal markings as on the forewing. Antennae, head, thorax and abdomen black; beneath: the palpi, thorax and abdomen with a median longitudinal white line.

=== Female ===
Upperside: similar to that of the male but the median white transverse band across both wings broader, extended on the forewing up to vein 7 and with no inner edging of blue or iridescent light blue irroration (speckling); the black at the bases of the wings and on the margins not so intense in shade, more of a brownish black. Underside: ground colour and markings very similar, the basal two oblique bands on the forewing generally farther from one another than in the male.

=== Larva ===
"The caterpillar, which feeds on young shoots of Ziziphus jujuba, is of the woodlouse form but flattened. Its texture though apparently smooth is, if looked at with a lens, found to be thickly covered with white hairs: its colour is greenish white with a faint green dorsal band." (Davidson, Bell & Aitken.)

- Pupa. "Similar in shape to that of Castalius rosimon, Fabricius, but smaller and narrower. It is of a bright apple-green with a darkish green line down the centre. There are some small red dots on the edges of the wing-cases." (Davidson, Bell & Aitken.)

== Range ==
Manipur to southern Myanmar and Thailand.

== See also ==
- List of butterflies of India (Lycaenidae)
