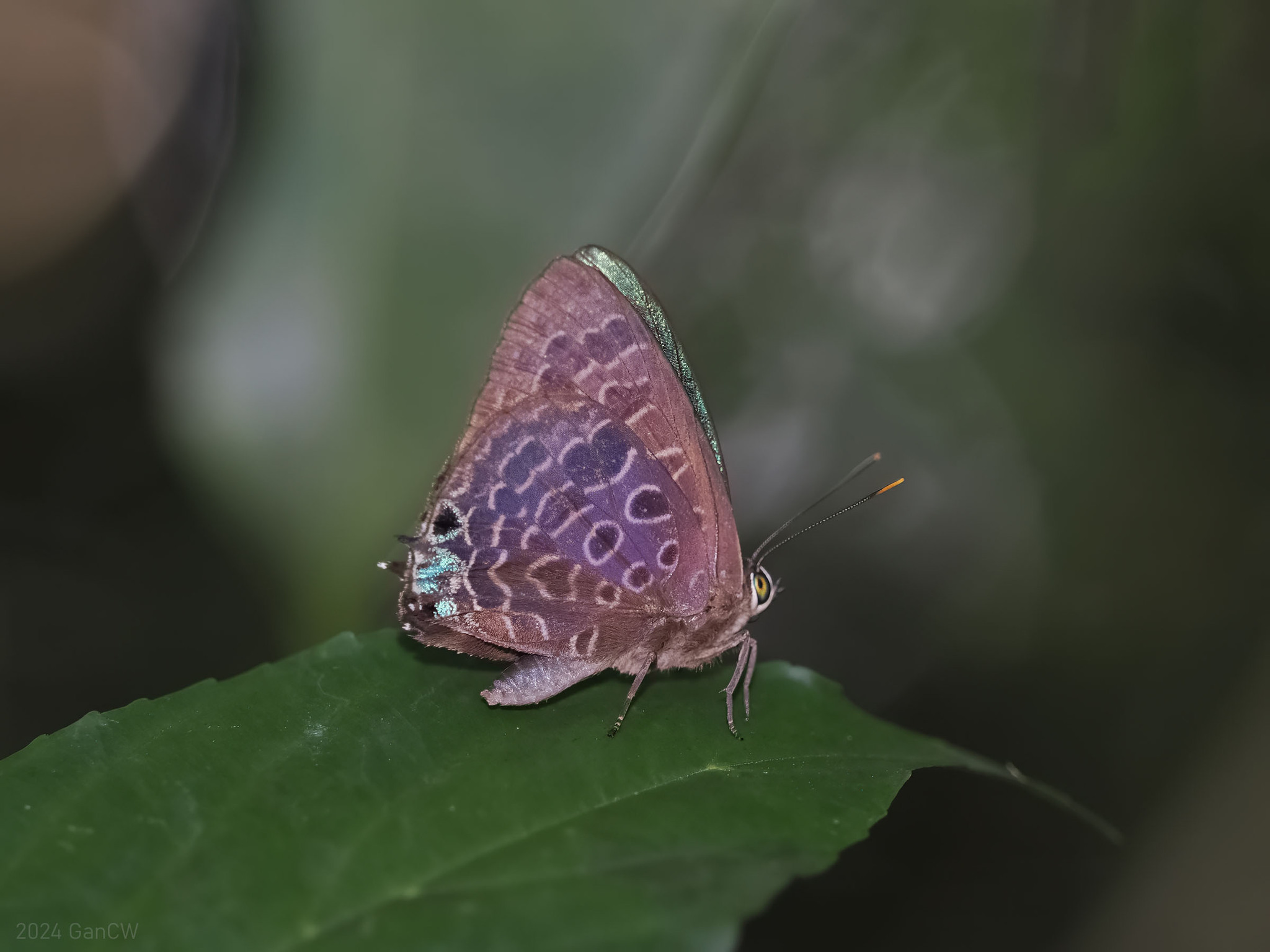
- In Upper Seletar Reservoir, Singapore

Scientific classification
- Kingdom: Animalia
- Phylum: Arthropoda
- Clade: Pancrustacea
- Class: Insecta
- Order: Lepidoptera
- Family: Lycaenidae
- Subfamily: Theclinae
- Tribe: Arhopalini
- Genus: Arhopala
- Species: A. trogon

Binomial name
- Arhopala trogon Distant, 1884

Synonyms
- Panchala trogon

= Arhopala trogon =

Species of butterfly

Arhopala trogon, the green-suffused oakblue, is a species of butterfly in the family Lycaenidae. It was discovered by William Lucas Distant in 1884. It is found in West Malaysia, Singapore and Borneo.

== Description ==
Illustration

Males are bright metallic emerald green on the upper side with the exception of the abdomen which is chocolate brown in colour. The underside is purplish-brown. The wingspan is 36 millimetres.

== Subspecies ==
Two subspecies are recognised-

- Arhopala trogon perelegans
- Arhopala trogon trogon
