= Kolana chlamys =

Scientific classification
- Domain: Eukaryota
- Kingdom: Animalia
- Phylum: Arthropoda
- Class: Insecta
- Order: Lepidoptera
- Family: Lycaenidae
- Genus: Kolana
- Species: K. chlamys

Binomial name
- Kolana chlamys (Druce, 1907)

Synonyms
- Thecla chlamys Druce, 1907

Species of butterfly

Kolana chlamys is a butterfly in the family Lycaenidae. It was described by Druce in 1907. It has been found in Paraguay.
