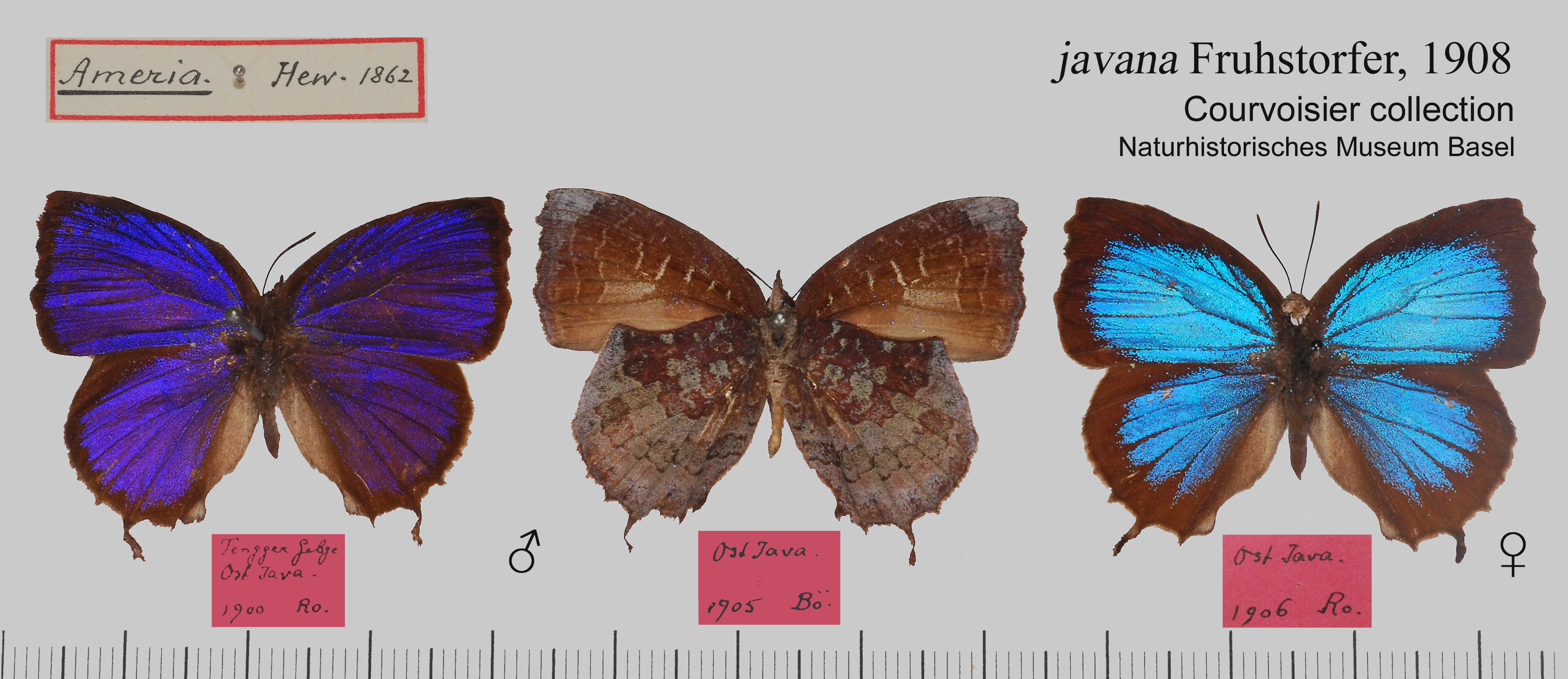

Scientific classification
- Domain: Eukaryota
- Kingdom: Animalia
- Phylum: Arthropoda
- Class: Insecta
- Order: Lepidoptera
- Family: Lycaenidae
- Genus: Mahathala
- Species: M. ariadeva

Binomial name
- Mahathala ariadeva Fruhstorfer, 1908

Synonyms
- Mahathala ameria ariadeva Fruhstorfer, 1908; Mahathala ameria burmana Talbot, 1942

= Mahathala ariadeva =

Species of butterfly

Mahathala ariadeva, the Malayan Falcate Oakblue, is a butterfly in the family Lycaenidae. It was described by Hans Fruhstorfer in 1908. It is found in the Indomalayan realm.

== Subspecies ==
- Mahathala ariadeva ariadeva (Peninsular Malaysia, Sumatra)
- Mahathala ariadeva burmana Talbot, 1942 (Burma, Thailand)
