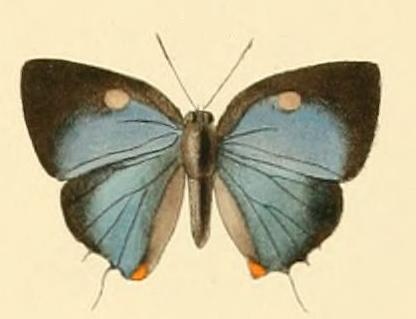

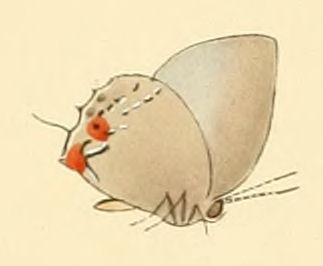

Scientific classification
- Domain: Eukaryota
- Kingdom: Animalia
- Phylum: Arthropoda
- Class: Insecta
- Order: Lepidoptera
- Family: Lycaenidae
- Genus: Kolana
- Species: K. ergina

Binomial name
- Kolana ergina (Hewitson, 1867)

Synonyms
- Thecla ergina Hewitson, 1867; Thecla voltinia Hewitson, 1869; Thecla ela Hewitson, 1874

= Kolana ergina =

Species of butterfly

Kolana ergina is a butterfly in the family Lycaenidae. It is found in Brazil (Amazonas) and French Guiana.
