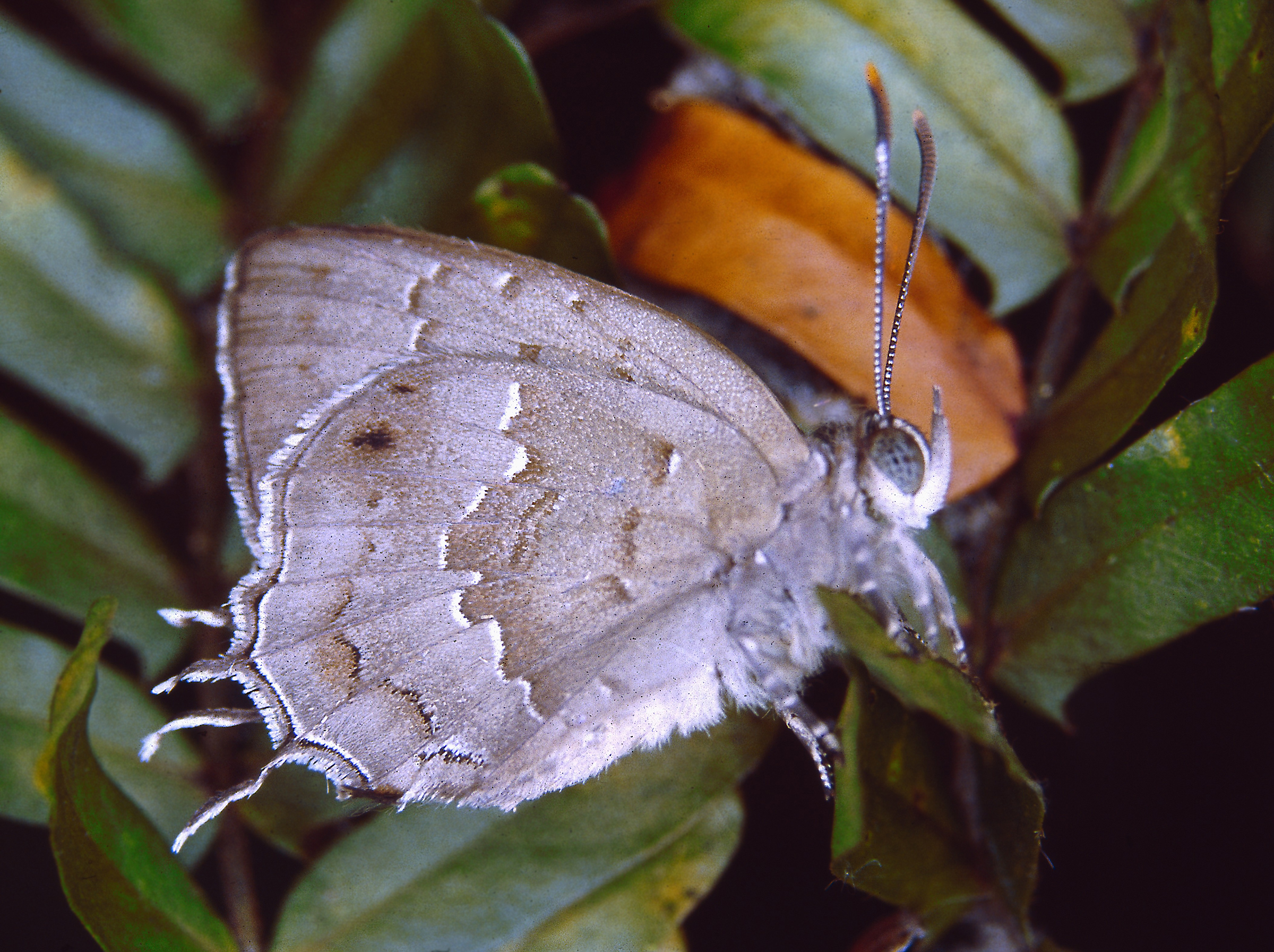
- In North Sulawesi

Scientific classification
- Domain: Eukaryota
- Kingdom: Animalia
- Phylum: Arthropoda
- Class: Insecta
- Order: Lepidoptera
- Family: Lycaenidae
- Genus: Surendra
- Species: S. vivarna

Binomial name
- Surendra vivarna (Horsfield, 1829)

Synonyms
- Amblypodia vivarna Horsfield, [1829]; Amblypodia amisena Hewitson, 1862

= Surendra vivarna =

Acacia blue

Species of butterfly

Surendra vivarna, the acacia blue, is a species of lycaenid or hairstreak butterfly found in Sri Lanka, India and the Indonesian islands as far as Sulawesi.

== Range ==
Its range is similar to that of its genus, Surendra, except it is not recorded from China or the Philippines proper (where it is replaced by S. maniliana), but from Balabac, Palawan and the Calamian Islands.

== Description ==
Upperside: both wings rather intense deep blue: primaries with the costa broadly, posterior margin more broadly, apex still more broadly black; secondaries with the blue limited to just over the median area, the rest of the wings black. Tails two, black, the longer one white-tipped. Underside : both wings very dark greyish brown: primaries with an obscure dark dot near the centre of the cell and a small dash closing it, costa with three dark dots; transverse blackish line curved irregularly and scalloped from the costa to the submedian nervure, a submarginal row of blackish dots, margin obscurely dark, internal area quite pale: secondaries with a small white spot about one-third along the costal nervure, below which is an obscure dark short dash in the cell; from two-thirds along the costa to the middle of the abdominal margin is a narrow, indefinite, obscure band of dark shading edged externally and sharply with white, a submarginal row of dark spots forming an almost lunular line; on each side of the long tail is a slight grey scaling. Upperside: both wings entirely dark brown. Underside as in the male, but decidedly paler.

— Bethune-Baker, A Revision of the Amblypodia Group of Butterflies of the Family Lycaenidae

== Subspecies ==
- Surendra vivarna amisena Hewitson, 1862, (South Burma, Thailand, Malaya, and Sumatra)
- Surendra vivarna palowna Staudinger, 1889, (Borneo)
- Surendra vivarna samina Fruhstorfer, 1904, (Sulawesi)
- Surendra vivarna agdistis Fruhstorfer (Nias)
- Surendra vivarna biplagiata Butler, 1883 (southern India)
- Surendra vivarna latimargo Moore, 1879 (Andamans)
- Surendra vivarna discalis Moore (Sri Lanka)

== Food plants ==
Fabaceae (Acacia, Albizia, Paraserianthes) and it is facultatively attended by various ants.

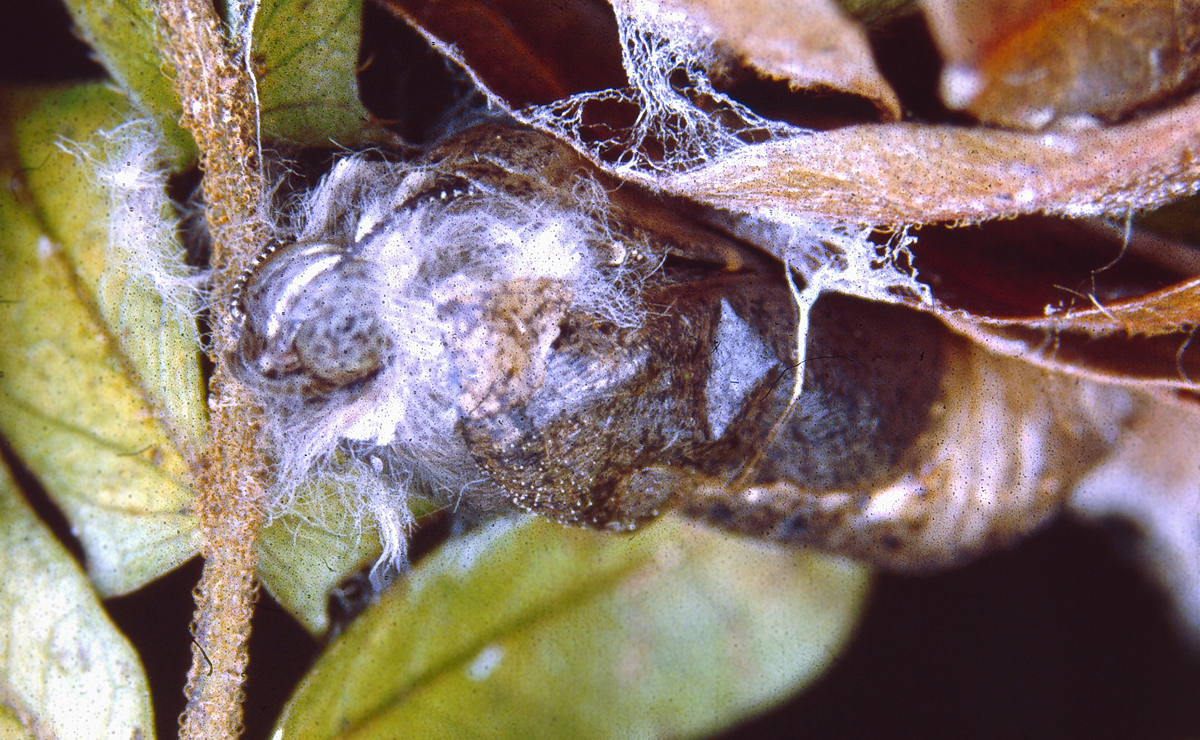
About to emerge

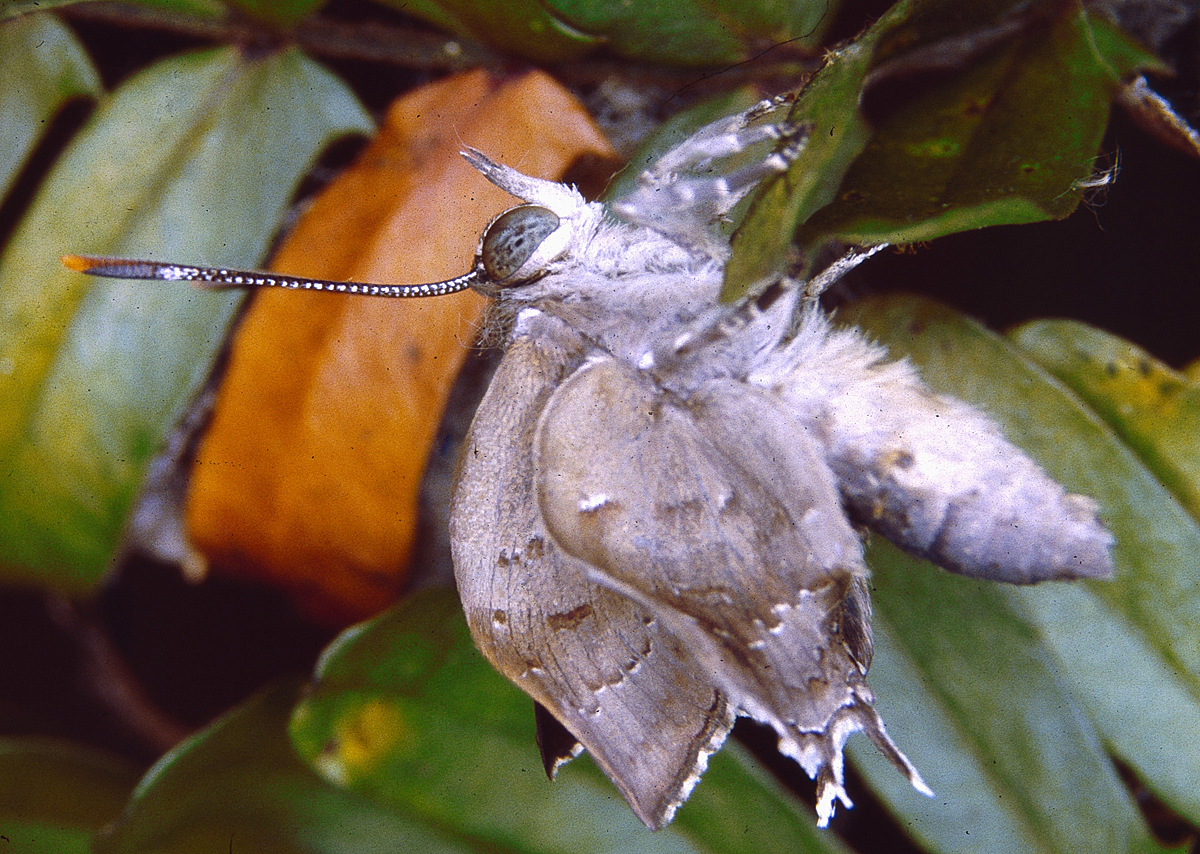
Wings enlarging

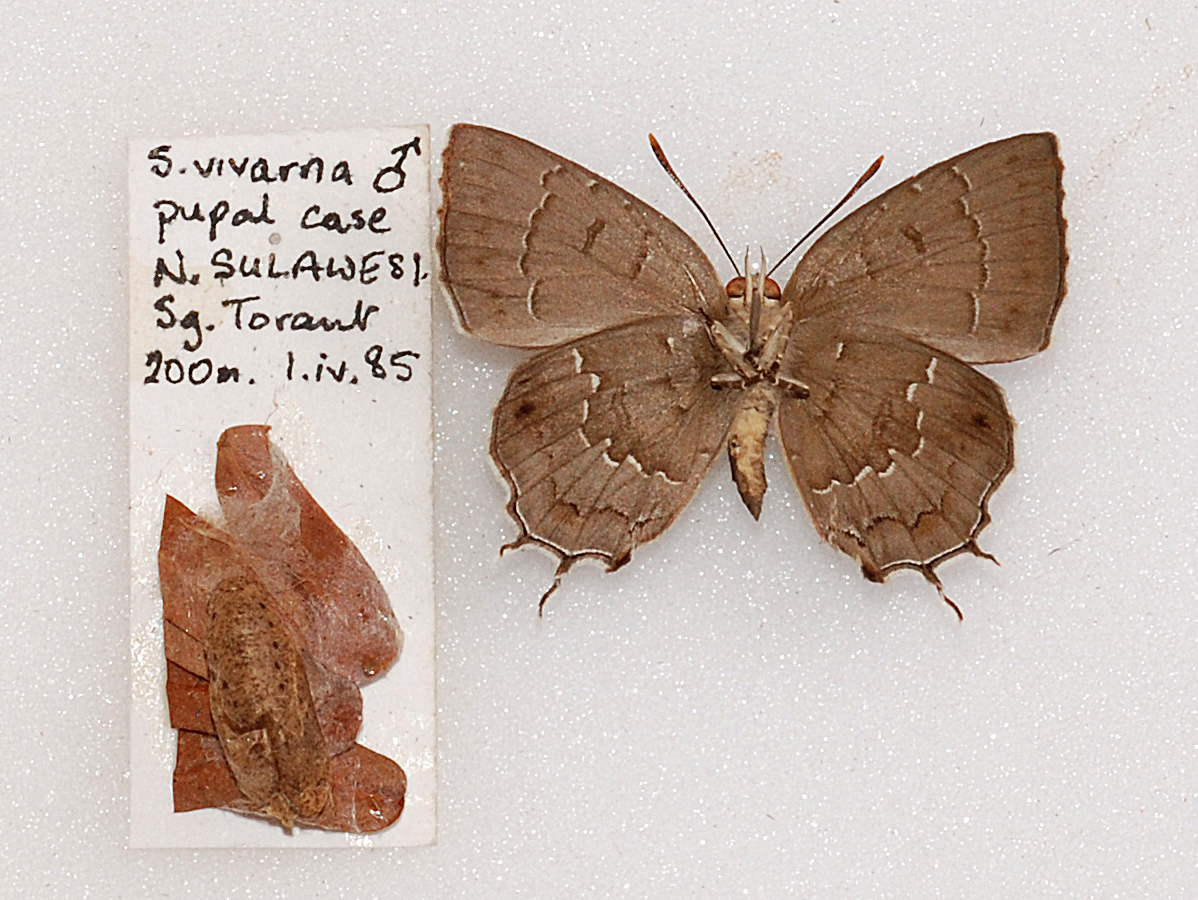
Male, underside, North Sulawesi

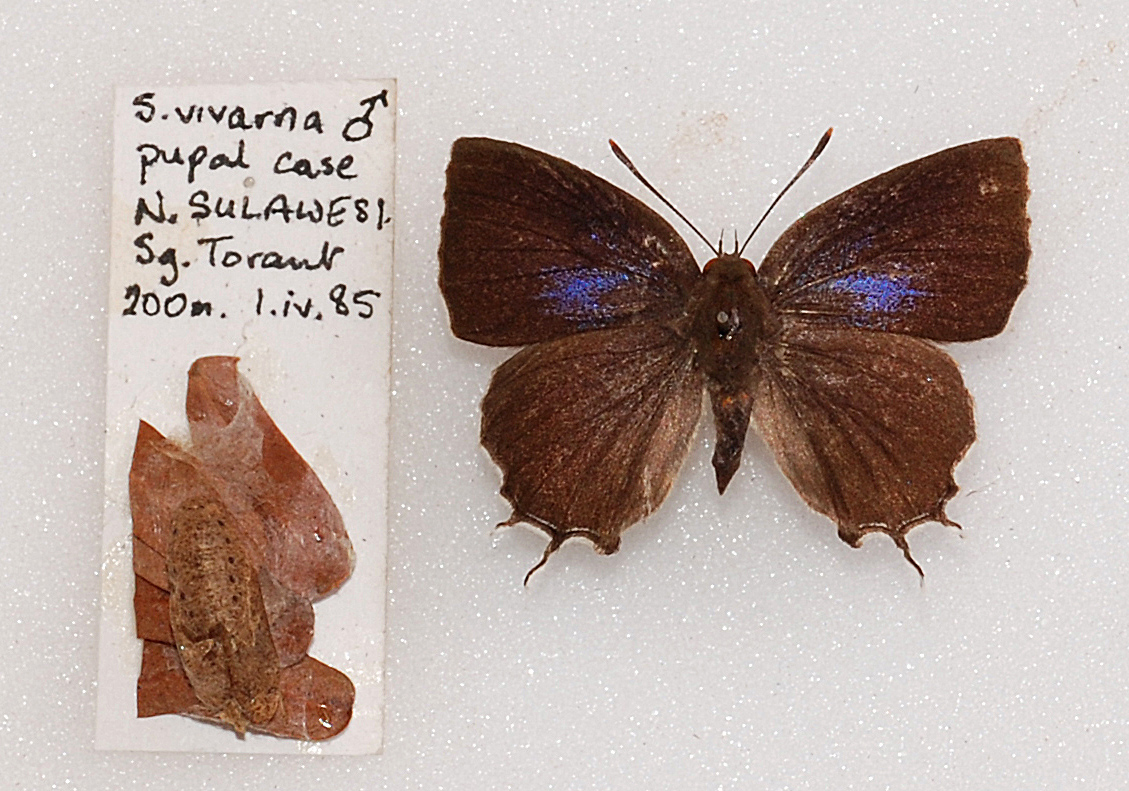
Male, upperside, North Sulawesi

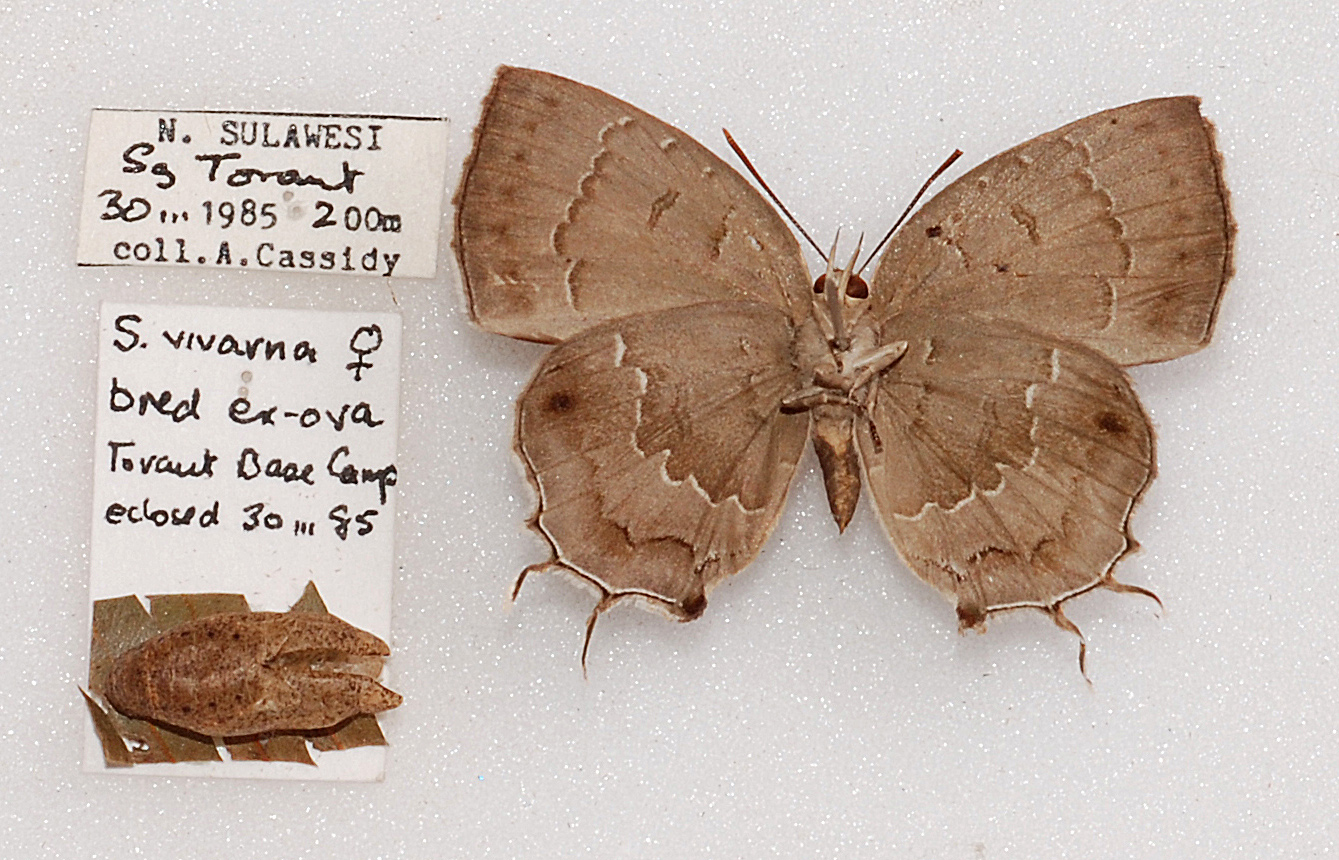
Female, underside, North Sulawesi

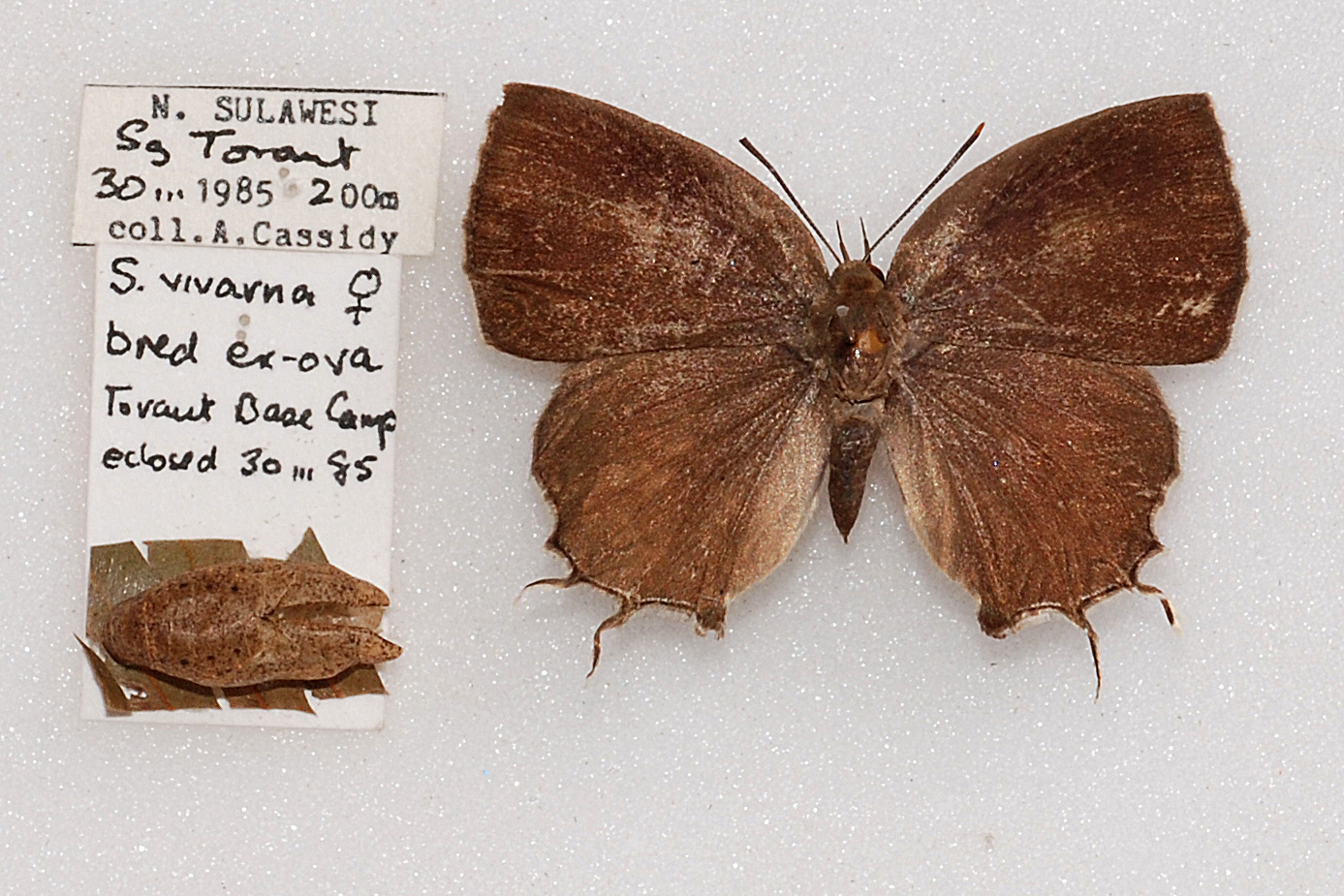
Female, underside, North Sulawesi

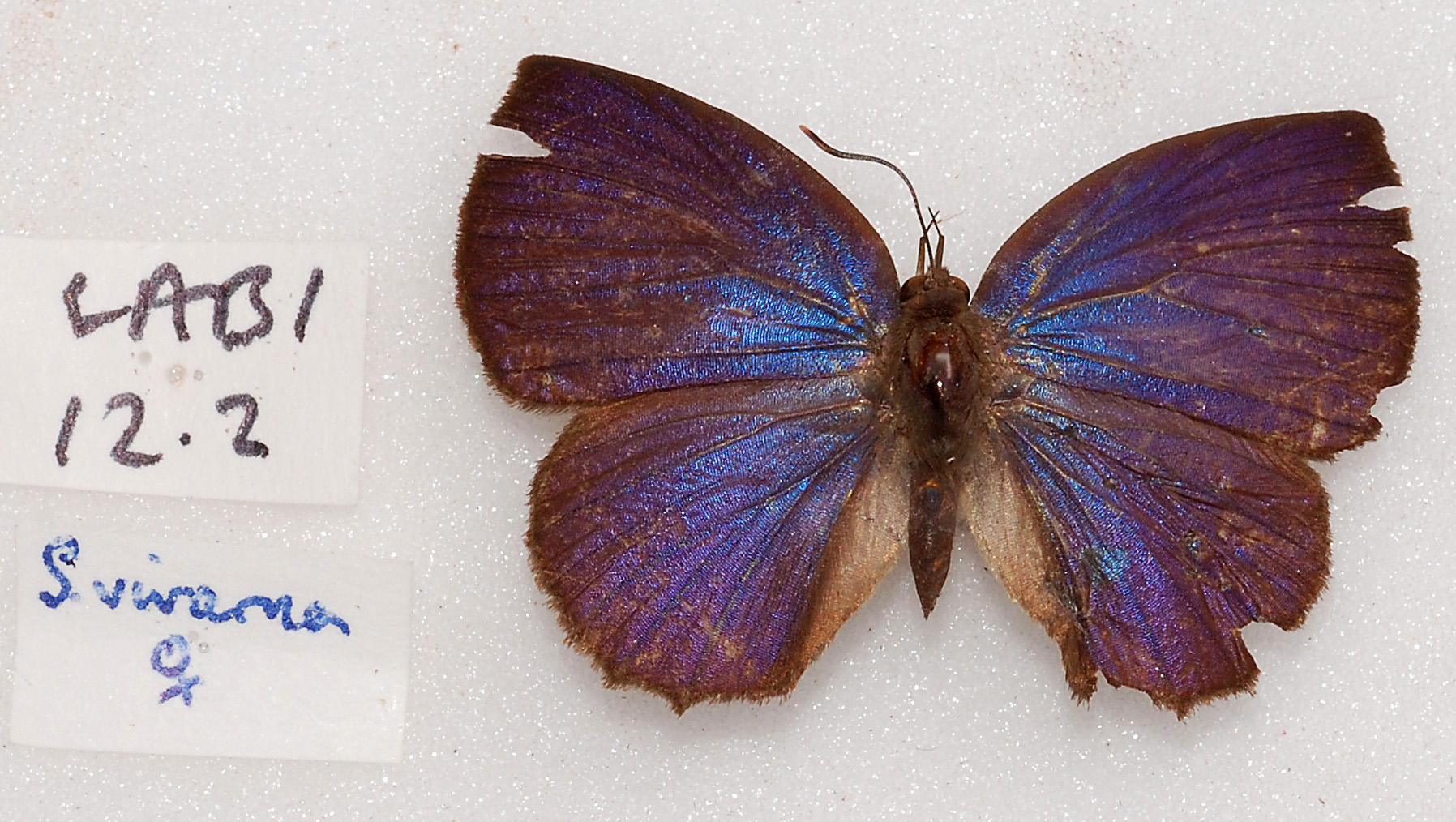
Female, upperside, West Brunei

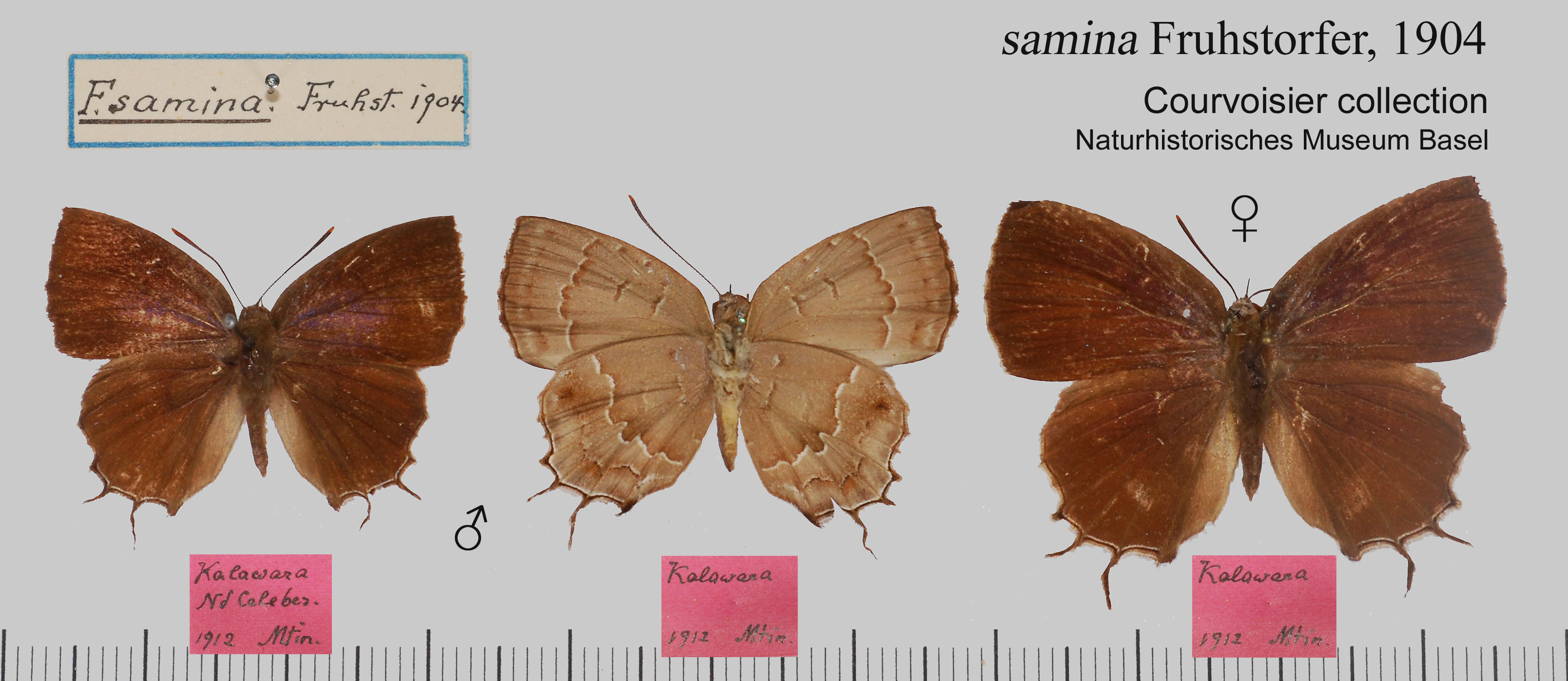
Male and female S.v.samina

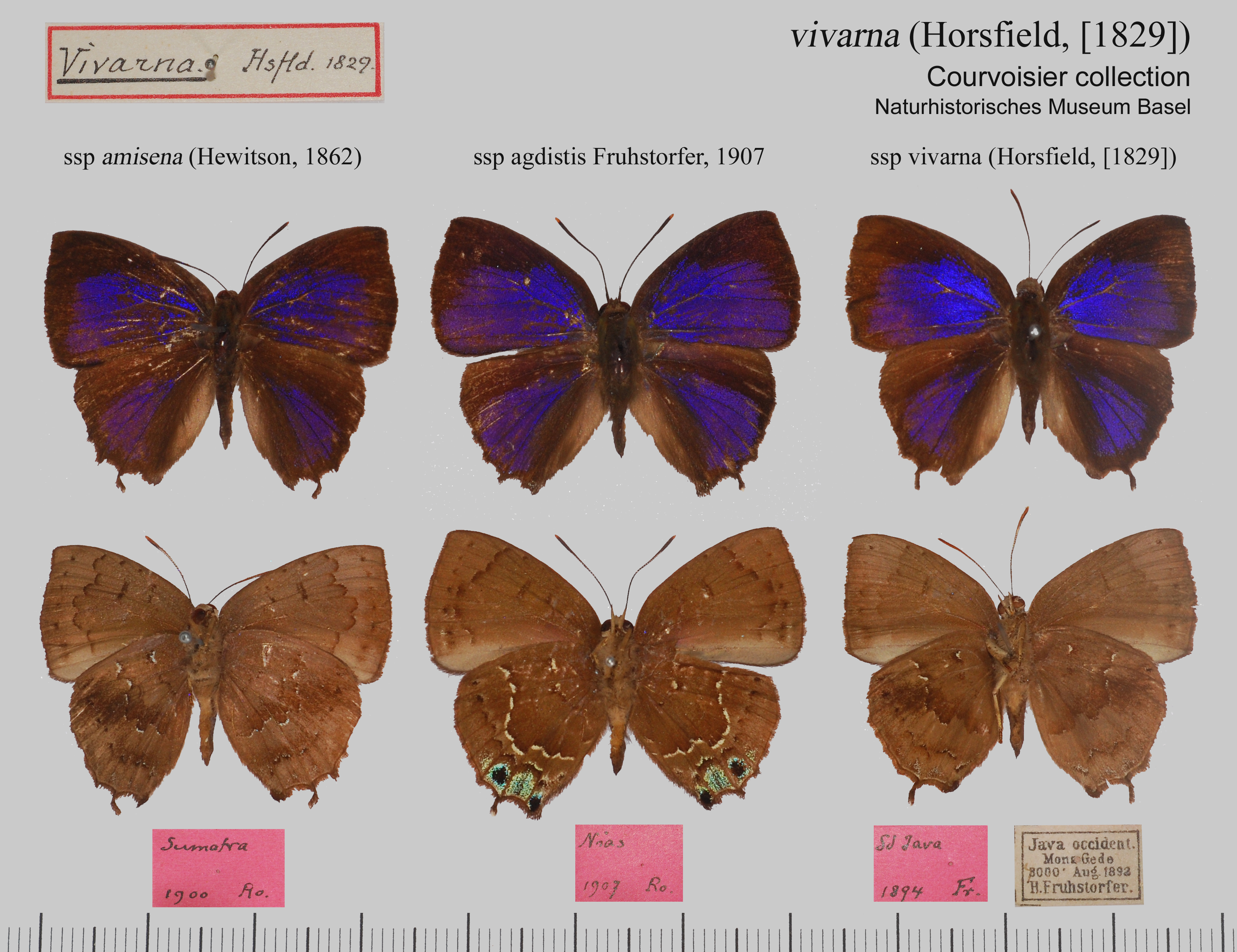
From the Courvoisier Collection, Basel, Switzerland

== See also ==
- Lycaenidae
- List of butterflies of India
- List of butterflies of India (Lycaenidae)

== Cited references ==
- Data related to Surendra vivarna at Wikispecies
- Media related to Surendra vivarna at Wikimedia Commons
