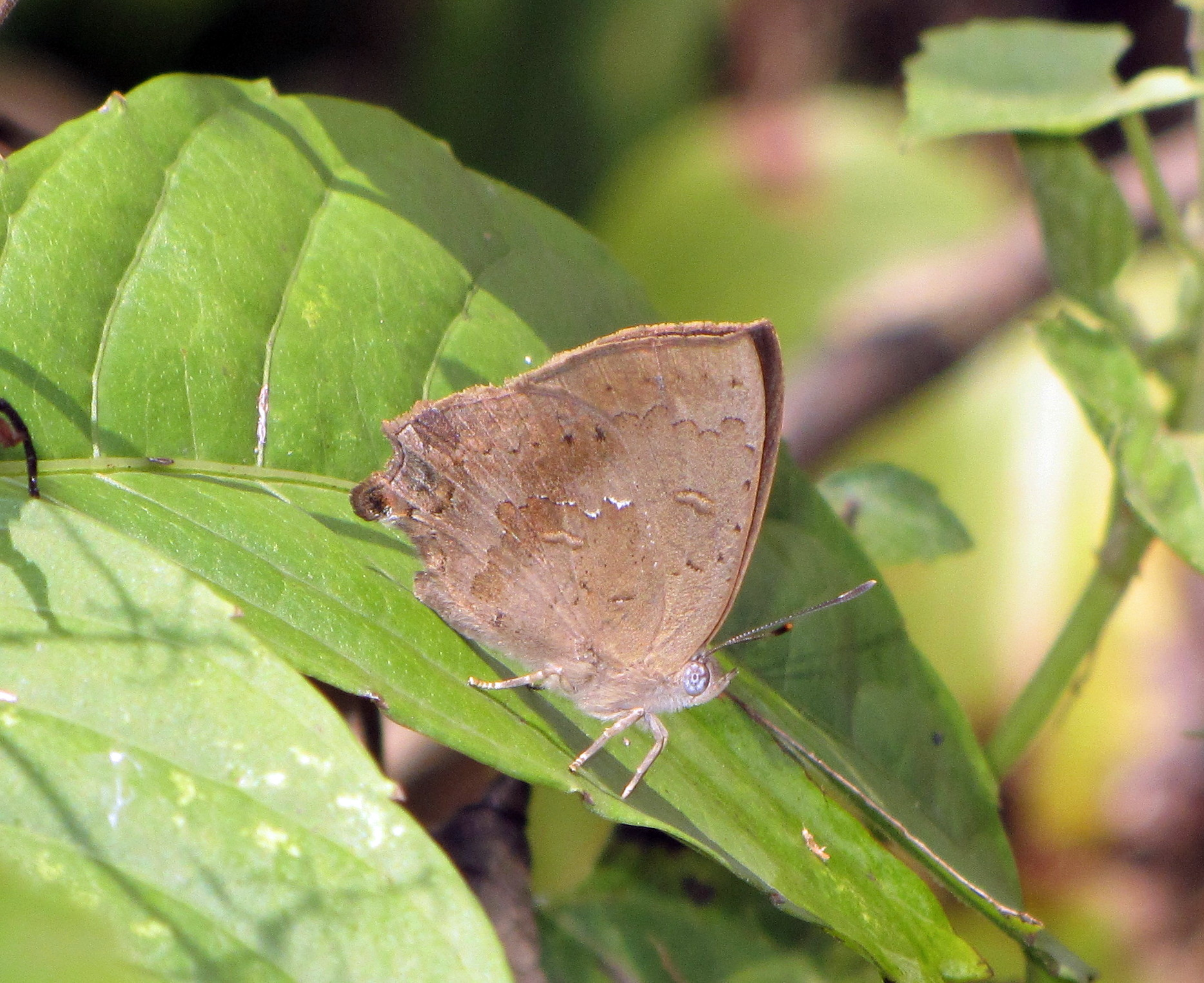

Scientific classification
- Kingdom: Animalia
- Phylum: Arthropoda
- Class: Insecta
- Order: Lepidoptera
- Family: Lycaenidae
- Genus: Surendra
- Species: S. quercetorum

Binomial name
- Surendra quercetorum (Moore, 1857)

Synonyms
- Amblypodia quercetorum Moore, [1858]

= Surendra quercetorum =

Common acacia blue

Species of butterfly

Surendra quercetorum, the common acacia blue, is a species of lycaenid or blue butterfly found in the Indomalayan realm(in Simla Hills - Assam, Burma, South Bihaar, China, Vietnam).

The larvae feed on Acacia pennata and Acacia caesia.

== Subspecies ==
- Surendra quercetorum quercetorum Moore, 1857 (S.Yunnan, Uttarakhand to N.E. India)
- Surendra quercetorum neritos Fruhstorfer, 1907 (Vietnam)
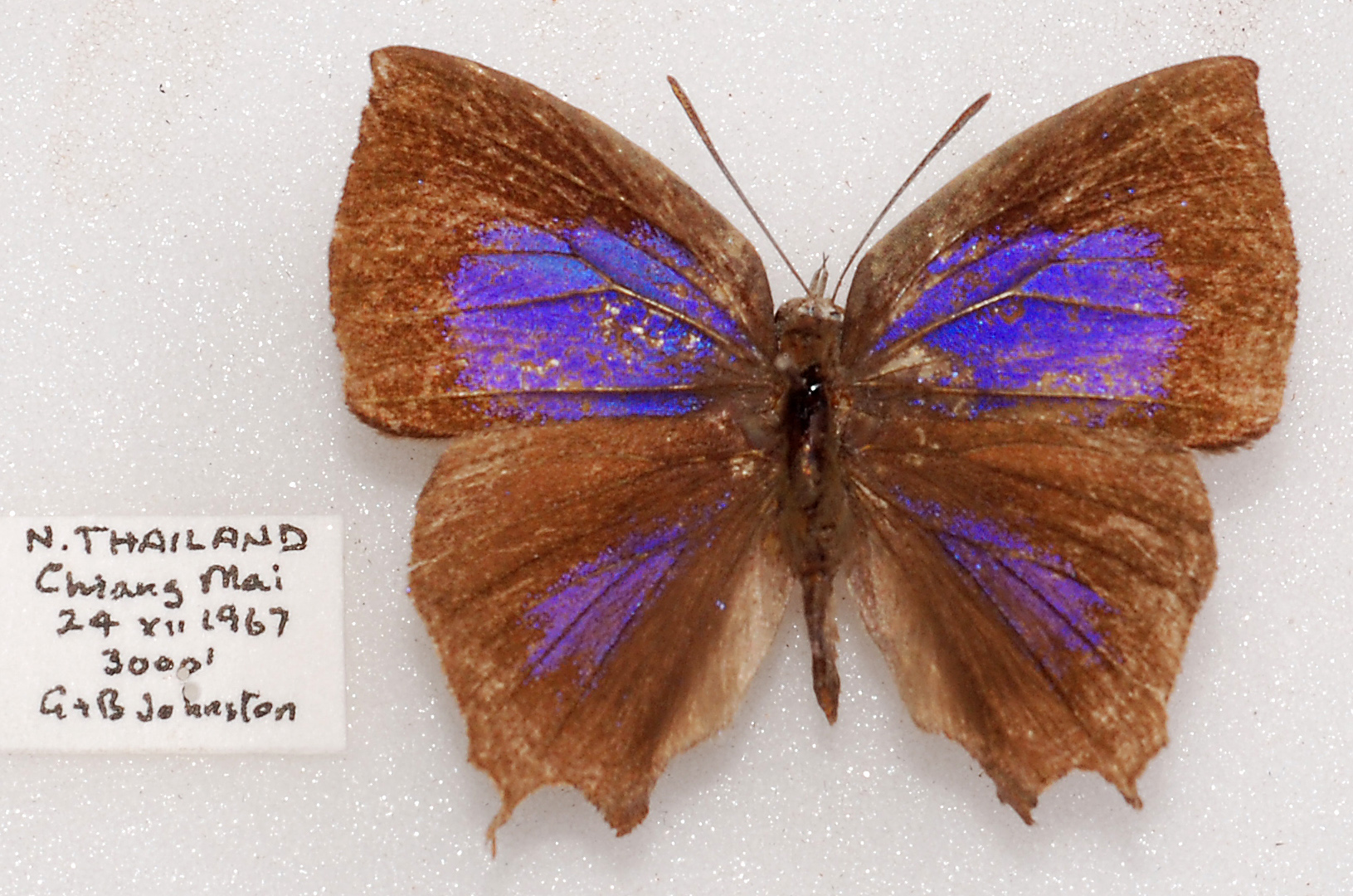
Male, upperside from northern Thailand

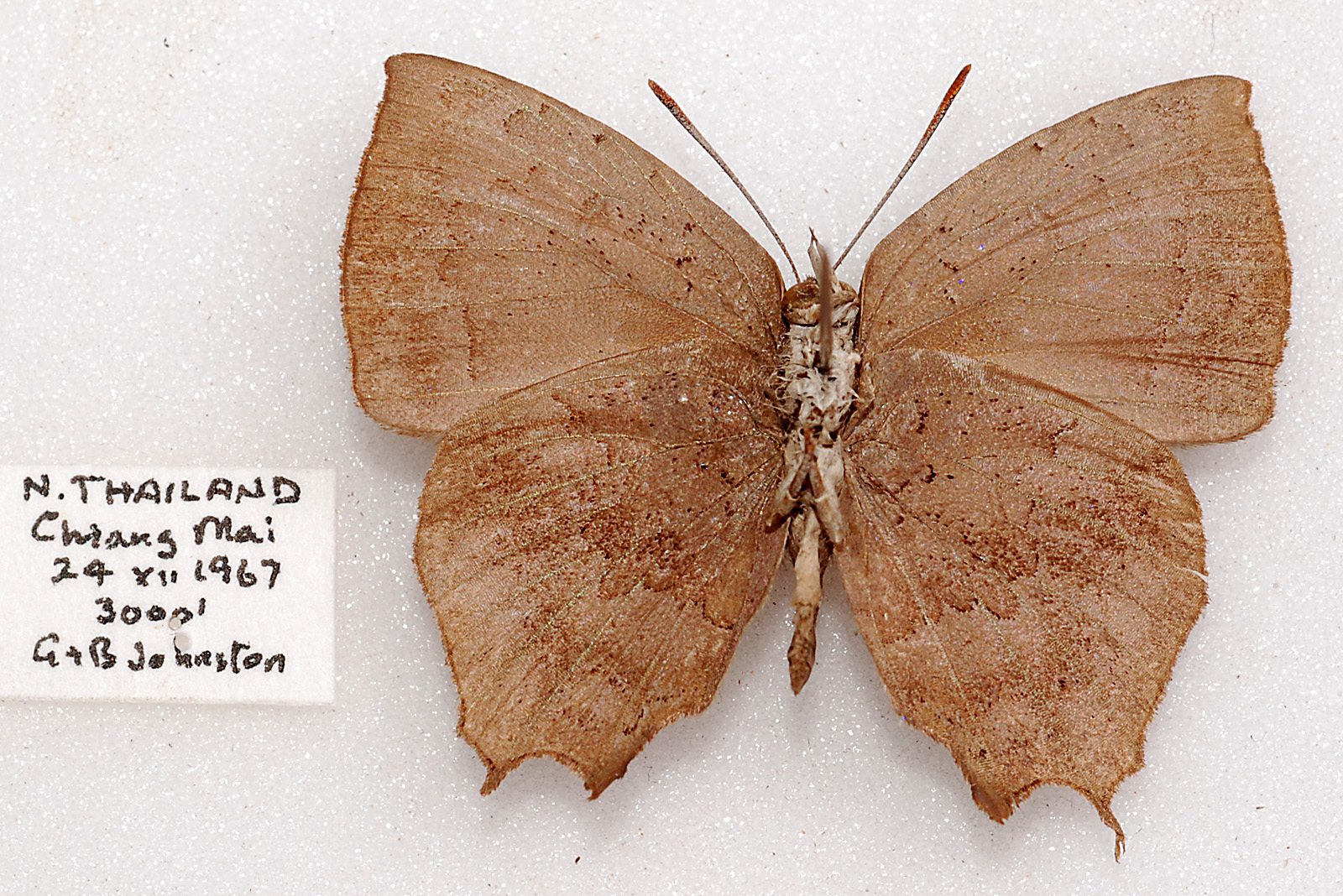
Male, underside from northern Thailand

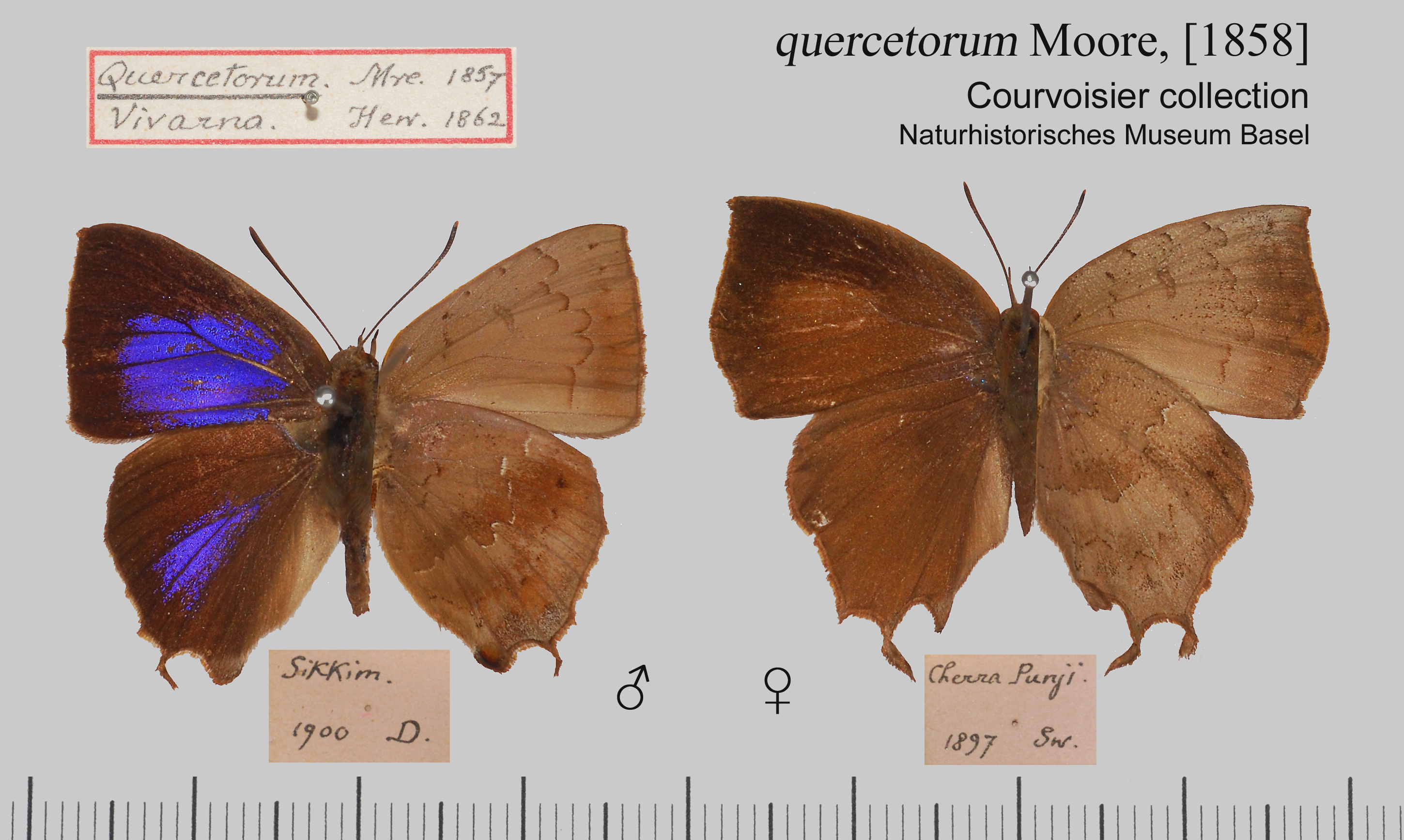
Male and female Courvoisier Collection, Basel
