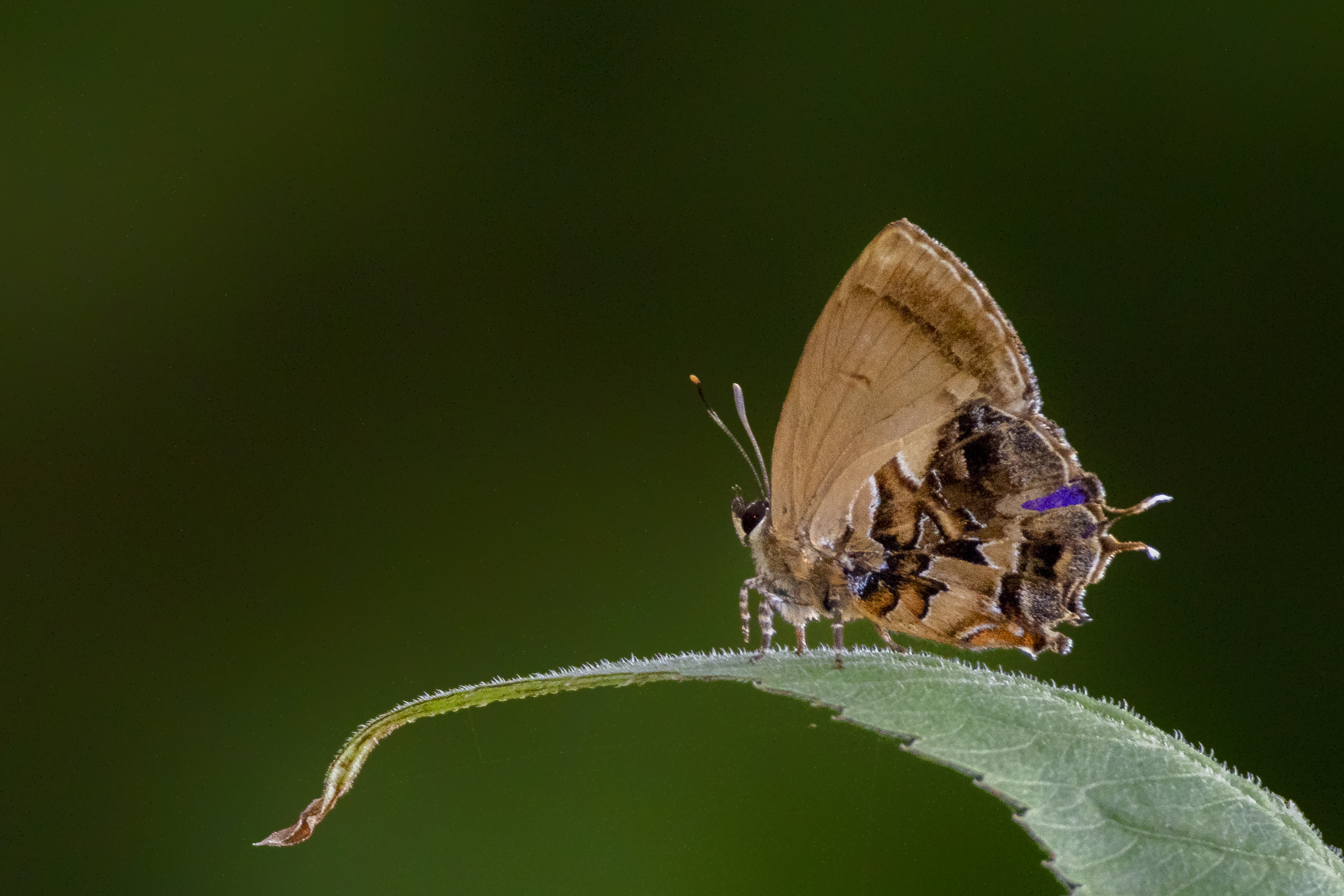

Scientific classification
- Kingdom: Animalia
- Phylum: Arthropoda
- Clade: Pancrustacea
- Class: Insecta
- Order: Lepidoptera
- Family: Lycaenidae
- Genus: Mota
- Species: M. massyla

Binomial name
- Mota massyla (Hewitson, 1869)

= Mota massyla =

Species of butterfly

Mota massyla, the saffron, is a species of blue butterfly found in South East Asia.

== Range ==
The butterfly occurs in India in the Himalayas from Sikkim to Bhutan, Assam and Manipur. It extends to Sylhet and Naga hills. The range extends eastwards to northern Thailand and southern Yunnan.
