= Kolana ligurina =

Scientific classification
- Domain: Eukaryota
- Kingdom: Animalia
- Phylum: Arthropoda
- Class: Insecta
- Order: Lepidoptera
- Family: Lycaenidae
- Genus: Kolana
- Species: K. ligurina

Binomial name
- Kolana ligurina (Hewitson, 1874)

Synonyms
- Thecla ligurina Hewitson, 1874; Thecla corolena Hewitson, 1874

Species of butterfly

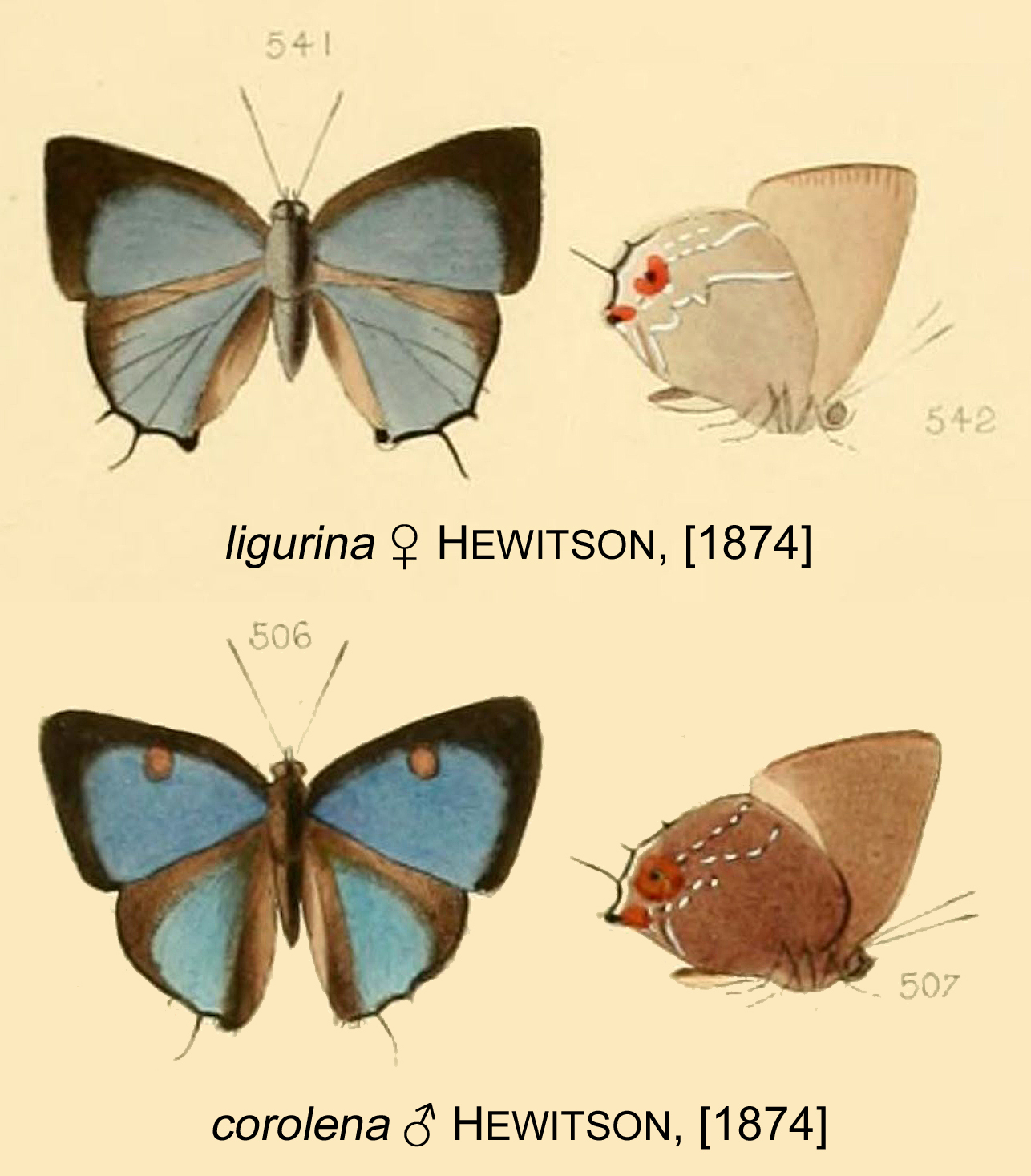
Liguria and corolena, from original descriptions.

Kolana ligurina is a butterfly in the family Lycaenidae. It was described by William Chapman Hewitson in 1874. It is found in Mexico, Nicaragua and French Guiana.
