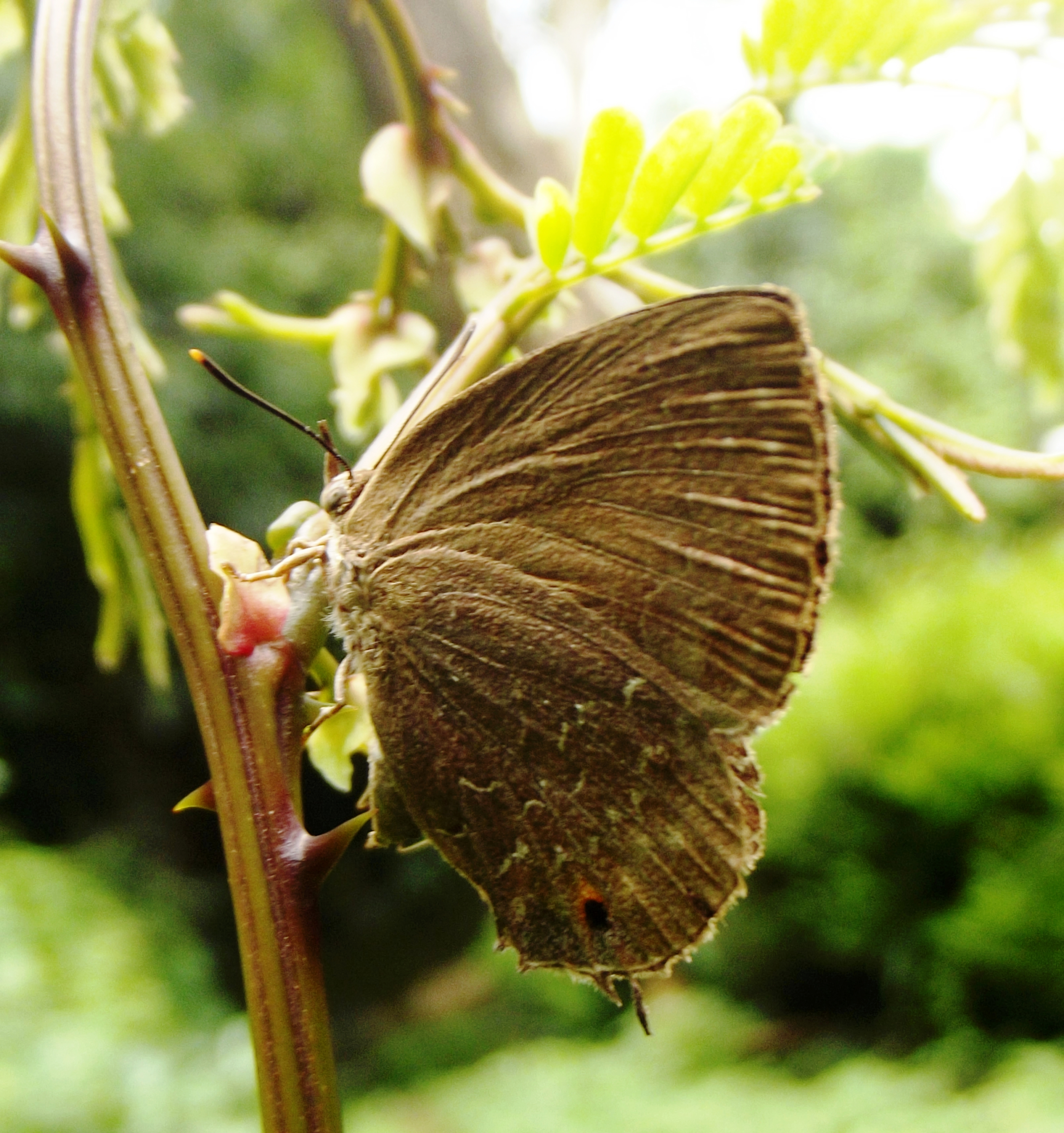
- From Kerala, India

Scientific classification
- Kingdom: Animalia
- Phylum: Arthropoda
- Class: Insecta
- Order: Lepidoptera
- Family: Lycaenidae
- Genus: Zinaspa
- Species: Z. todara

Binomial name
- Zinaspa todara (Moore, 1883)

Synonyms
- Surendra todara Moore, [1884]

= Zinaspa todara =

Silver streaked acacia blue

Species of butterfly

Zinaspa todara, the silver streaked acacia blue, is a species of lycaenid or blue butterfly found in South Asia.

== Description ==
Male. Upperside. Forewing black, deep shining purple on the inner portions, including the cell, and the basal two-thirds of the inner area above the internal vein. Hindwing with the purple area more extended, the costa and apex broadly and the outer margin narrowly black, the abdominal marginal space paler. Cilia black inwardly, white outwardly; tail black, tipped with white. Underside brown with a slight pinkish tint. Forewing with a fine discal brown line, outwardly edged with white, formed of more or less connected lunules, the first three from the costa in a gentle outward curve, the next two, one below the other, then the line is dislocated, the last portion being well inwards, a submarginal series of somewhat square brown spots edged on both sides with white. Hindwing with an indistinct sub-basal distorted line inwardly edged with white^ and two more prominent discal lines, the inner one outwardly edged, the outer one (more regular and much dentated) inwardly edged with white; faint indications of a sub-marginal series, containing a rather large black spot capped with orange in interspace 2; from this to the anal lobe are scattered some white scales, and in the lobe is a large black spot, with some thicker white scaling capping it.

Female. Upperside. Forewing like the male, but the purple colour on its inner portions is usually much paler and duller. Hindwing varying much in different examples, sometimes it is nearly all blackish, sometimes the dull purplish colour is confined to the upper basal portions, and sometimes it runs into the lower half of the cell. Underside similar to the male, but generally somewhat paler, the markings more prominent. Antennae black; palpi black above, white beneath; head and body black above, brown beneath.

— Charles Swinhoe, Lepidoptera Indica. Vol. IX
