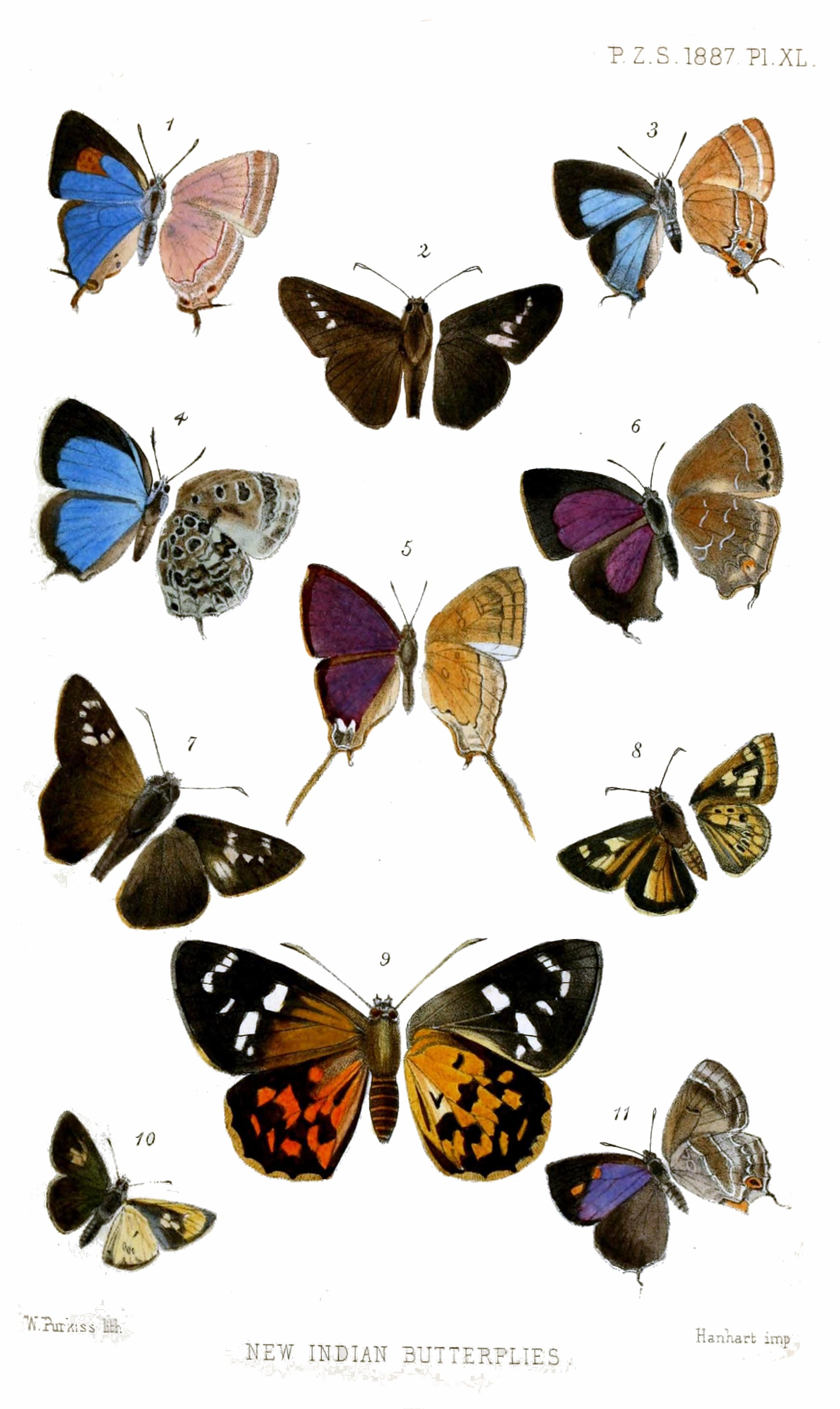
- Zinaspa distorta, figure 6

Scientific classification
- Kingdom: Animalia
- Phylum: Arthropoda
- Class: Insecta
- Order: Lepidoptera
- Family: Lycaenidae
- Tribe: Arhopalini
- Genus: Zinaspa de Nicéville, 1890

= Zinaspa =

Butterfly genus in family Lycaenidae

Zinaspa is an Indomalayan genus of butterflies in the family Lycaenidae.

== Species ==
- Zinaspa zana de Nicéville, 1898
- Zinaspa todara (Moore, [1884]) - silver-streaked acacia blue
- Zinaspa youngi Hsu & Johnson, 1998
- Zinaspa distorta (de Nicéville, 1887)
