= Kolana lyde =

Scientific classification
- Domain: Eukaryota
- Kingdom: Animalia
- Phylum: Arthropoda
- Class: Insecta
- Order: Lepidoptera
- Family: Lycaenidae
- Genus: Kolana
- Species: K. lyde

Binomial name
- Kolana lyde (Godman & Salvin, [1887])

Synonyms
- Thecla lyde Godman & Salvin, [1887]

Species of butterfly

Kolana lyde is a butterfly in the family Lycaenidae. It was described by Frederick DuCane Godman and Osbert Salvin in 1887. It is found in Guatemala, Panama and Mexico.
