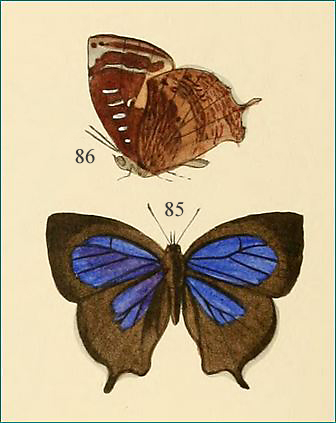
- Mahathala america, female, North India, from original description.
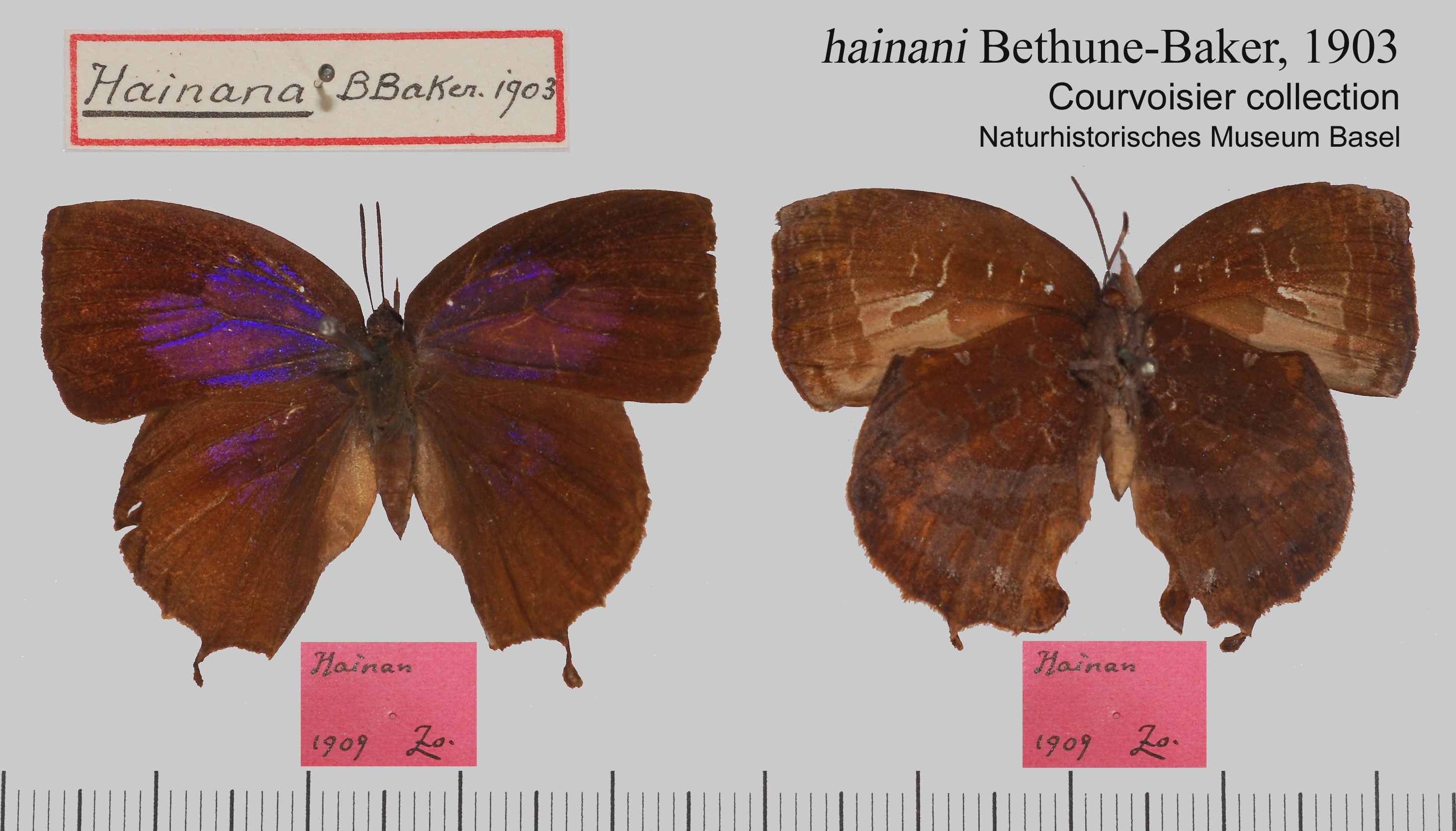
- Mahathala america hainani female Courvoisier Collection, Basel

Scientific classification
- Kingdom: Animalia
- Phylum: Arthropoda
- Class: Insecta
- Order: Lepidoptera
- Family: Lycaenidae
- Genus: Mahathala
- Species: M. ameria

Binomial name
- Mahathala ameria (Hewitson, 1862)

= Mahathala ameria =

Falcate oakblue

Species of butterfly

The Mahathala ameria, the falcate oakblue, is a species of blue butterfly, of the family Lycaenidae found in South-East Asia.

== Range ==
The butterfly occurs in India from Bengal to Assam, the Khasi Hills, and other parts of north-east India into southern Myanmar, Thailand, Laos and Java. It is also found in western and southern China, Hainan and Taiwan.

== Subspecies ==
- M. a. ameria West China, Bengal, Assam, Burma
- M. a. zistra Fruhstorfer, 1908 - Thailand
- M. a. javana Fruhstorfer, 1908 - Java
- M. a. hainani Bethune-Baker, 1903 - Indo China, South China, Hainan, Taiwan

== Status ==
Rare.

== See also ==
- List of butterflies of India (Lycaenidae)
