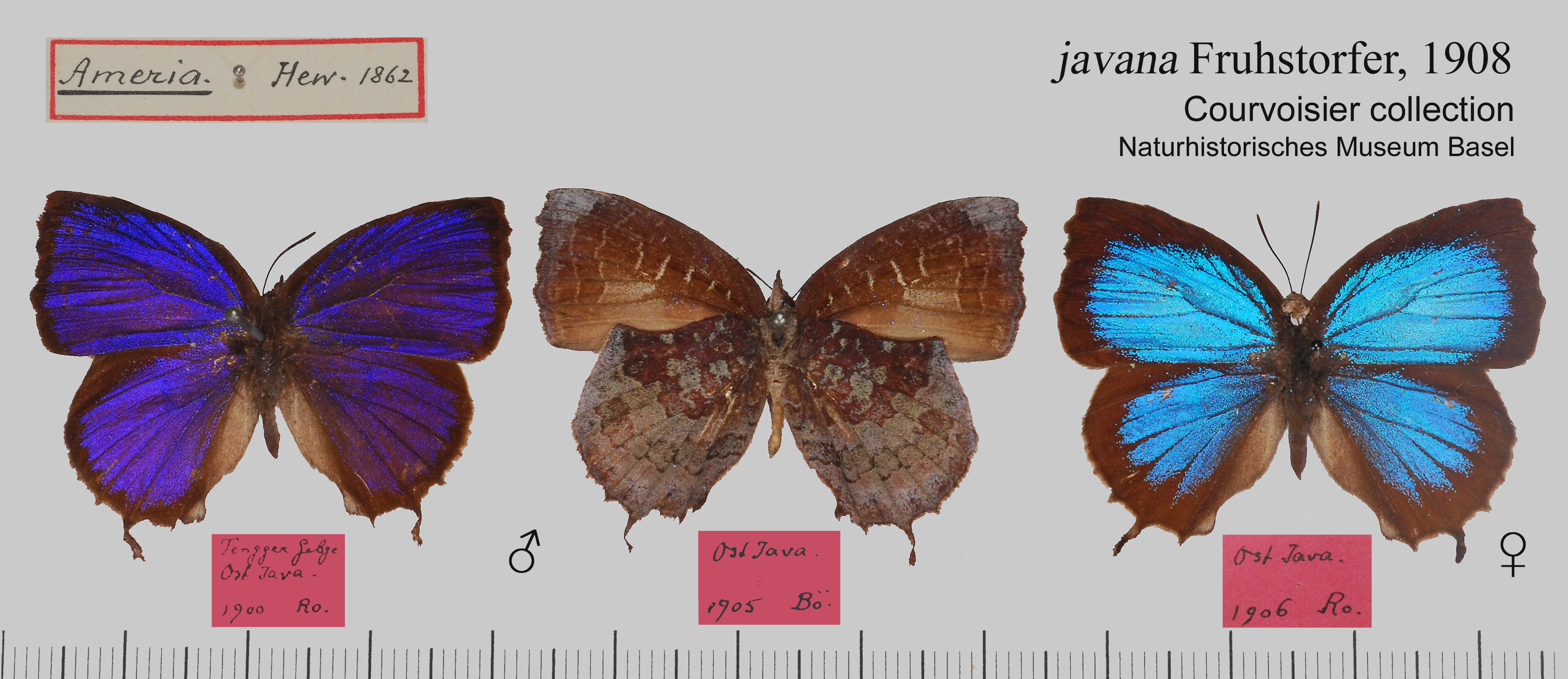
- Mahathala ariadeva javana

Scientific classification
- Kingdom: Animalia
- Phylum: Arthropoda
- Class: Insecta
- Order: Lepidoptera
- Family: Lycaenidae
- Tribe: Arhopalini
- Genus: Mahathala; Moore, 1878

= Mahathala =

Butterfly genus in family Lycaenidae

Mahathala is a small genus of hairstreak butterflies in the family Lycaenidae. Two species occur in Southeast Asia, the third is endemic to Mongolia.

== Species ==
- Mahathala ameria (Hewitson, 1862)
- Mahathala ariadeva Fruhstorfer, 1908 Burma, Thailand, Peninsular Malaya, Sumatra
- Mahathala gone Druce, 1895 Mongolia
