= Kolana buccina =

Scientific classification
- Kingdom: Animalia
- Phylum: Arthropoda
- Clade: Pancrustacea
- Class: Insecta
- Order: Lepidoptera
- Family: Lycaenidae
- Genus: Kolana
- Species: K. buccina

Binomial name
- Kolana buccina (Druce, 1907)

Synonyms
- Thecla buccina Druce, 1907

Species of butterfly

buccina

Kolana buccina is a butterfly in the family Lycaenidae. It was described by Druce in 1907. It is found in Brazil (Mato Grosso, Pará).
