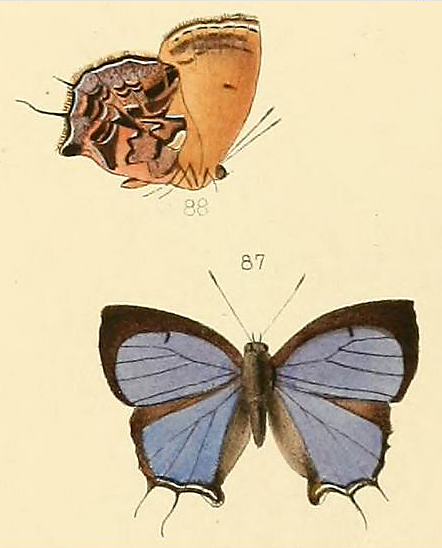
- Mota massyla

Scientific classification
- Kingdom: Animalia
- Phylum: Arthropoda
- Clade: Pancrustacea
- Class: Insecta
- Order: Lepidoptera
- Family: Lycaenidae
- Subfamily: Theclinae
- Tribe: Arhopalini
- Genus: Mota de Nicéville, 1890

= Mota (butterfly) =

Monotypic butterfly genus in family Lycaenidae

Mota is a genus of butterflies in the family Lycaenidae. The genus is monotypic containing the single Indomalayan species Mota massyla (Hewitson, 1869) (Sikkim, Bhutan, Manipur, Sylhet, Cherrapunji, Assam, Burma, Thailand, Yunnan).
