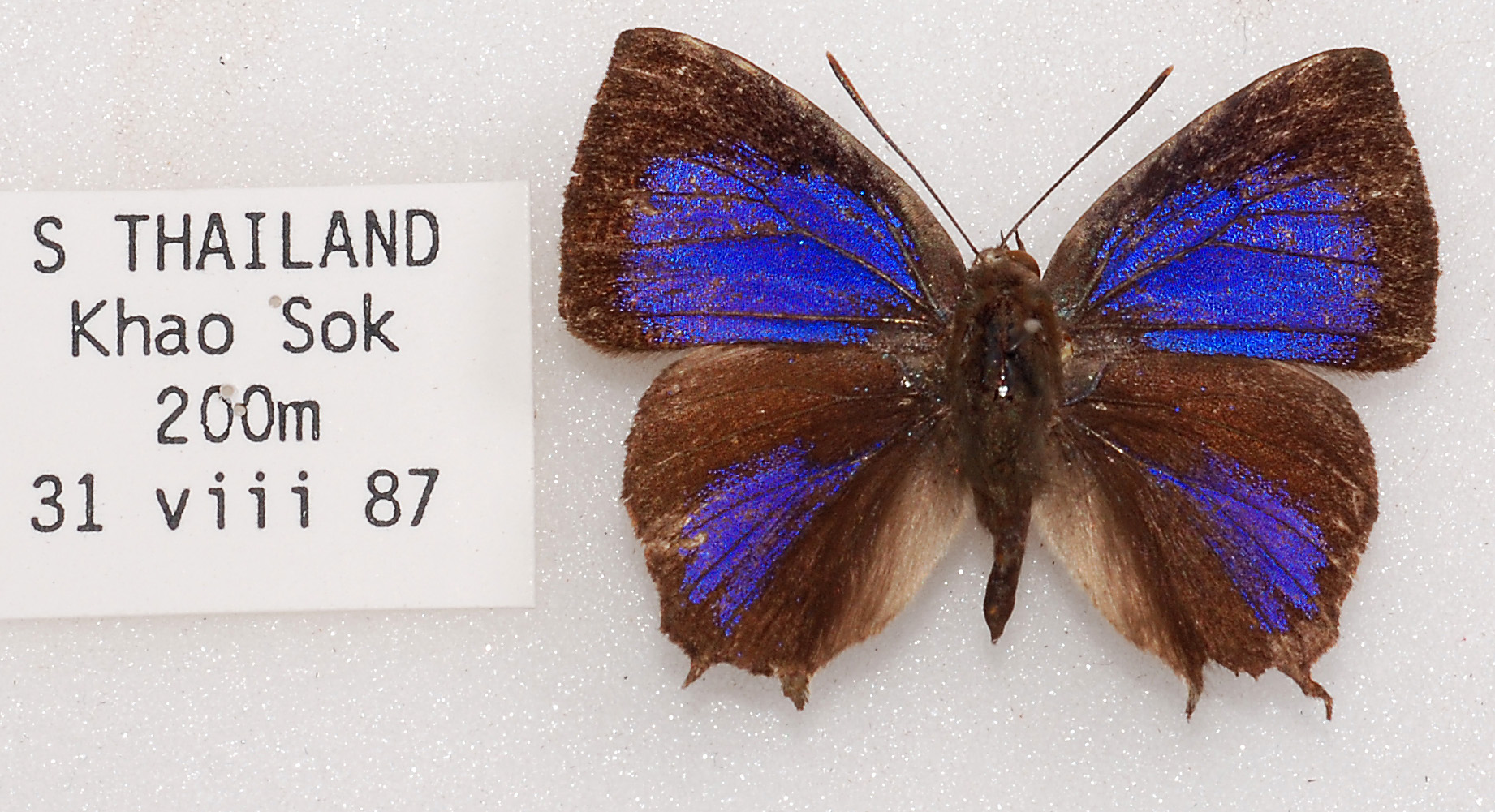
- Male from southern Thailand

Scientific classification
- Kingdom: Animalia
- Phylum: Arthropoda
- Class: Insecta
- Order: Lepidoptera
- Family: Lycaenidae
- Genus: Surendra
- Species: S. florimel

Binomial name
- Surendra florimel Doherty, 1889

Synonyms
- Surendra stimula de Nicéville, [1895]

= Surendra florimel =

Species of butterfly

Surendra florimel, the Eastern acacia blue a species of lycaenid or hairstreak butterfly found in South-East Asia.

== Range ==
Southern Burma, the Malay Peninsula, Sumatra, Java, Nias and Borneo.

== Description ==
In the male, the wings above are deep shining purplish blue, with a black apical border on the forewing, and on the hindwing both the costal and inner margins are broadly black bordered. The female is plain brown, with diffuse darker borders. The underside is brown, with a darker brown band across the wing from apex to the middle of the dorsum.

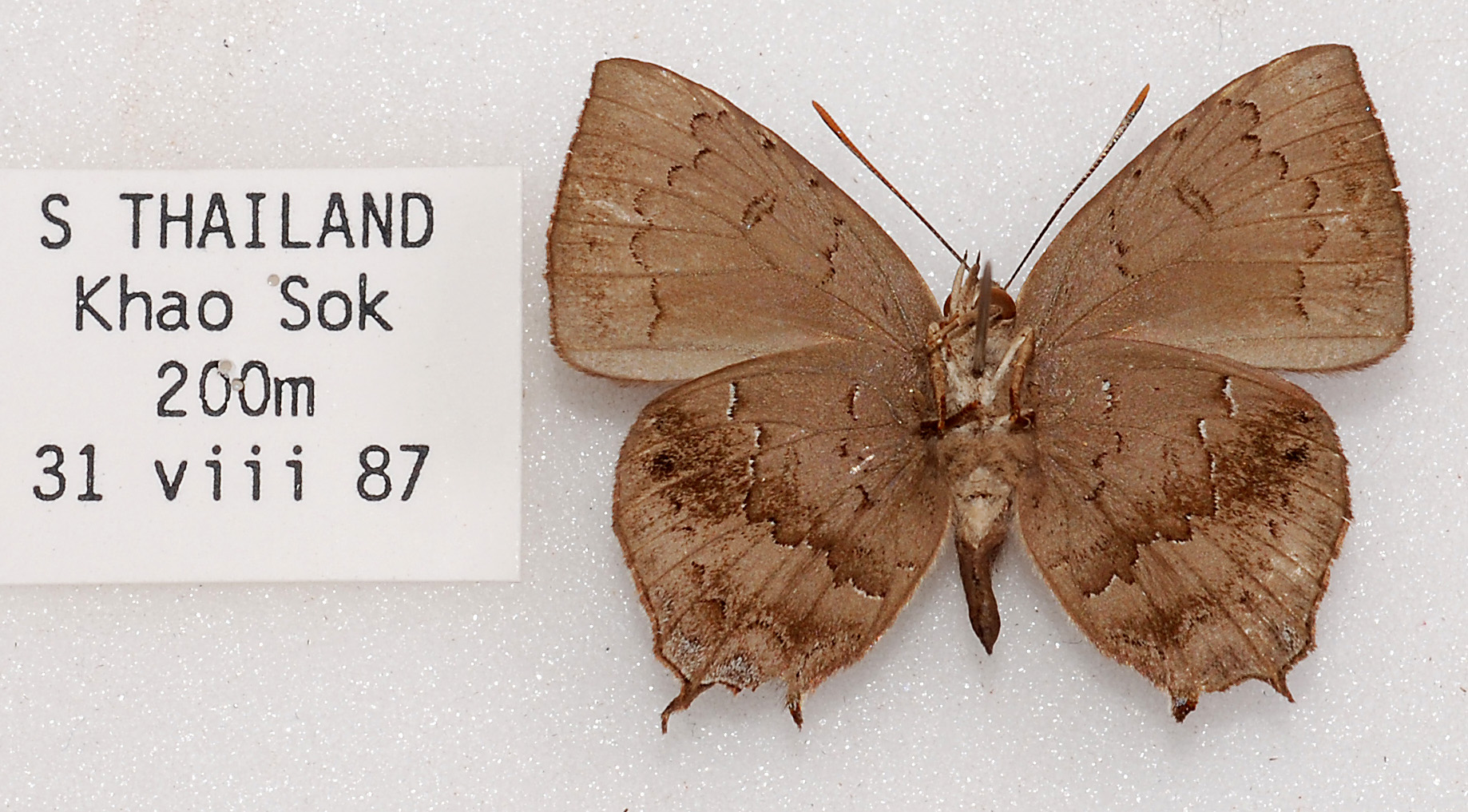
Male, underside, southern Thailand

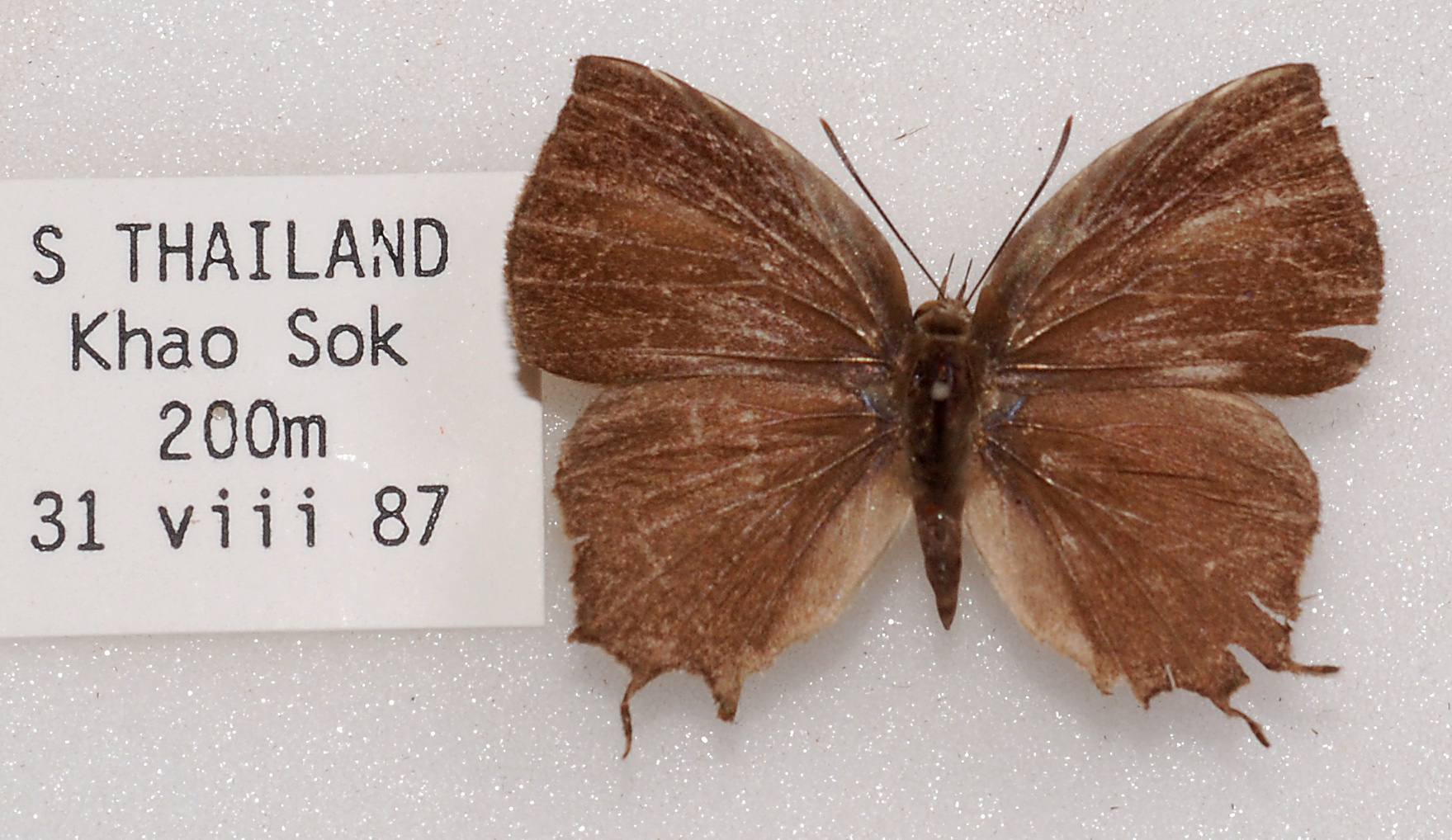
Female, upperside, southern Thailand

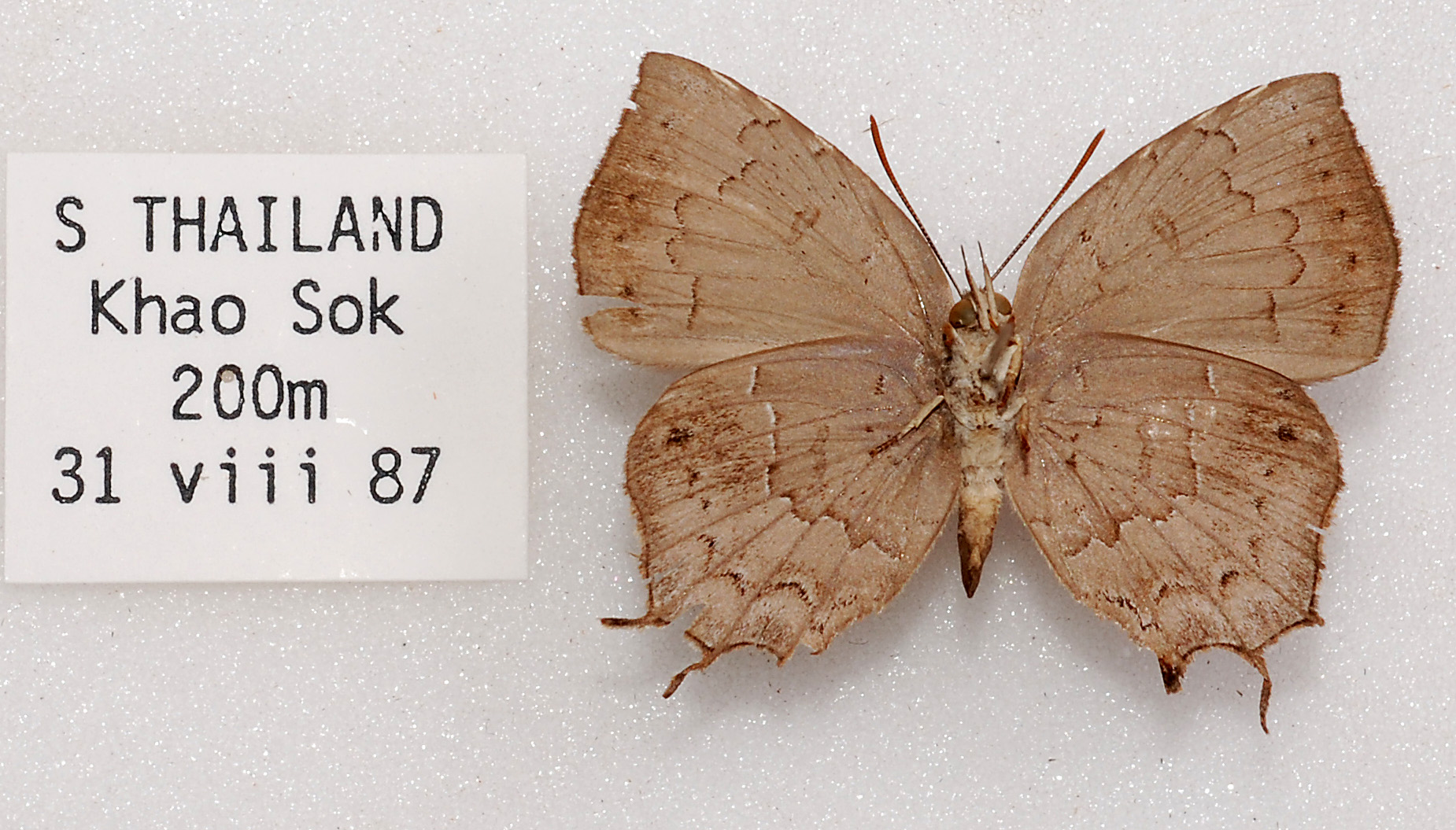
Female, underside, southern Thailand

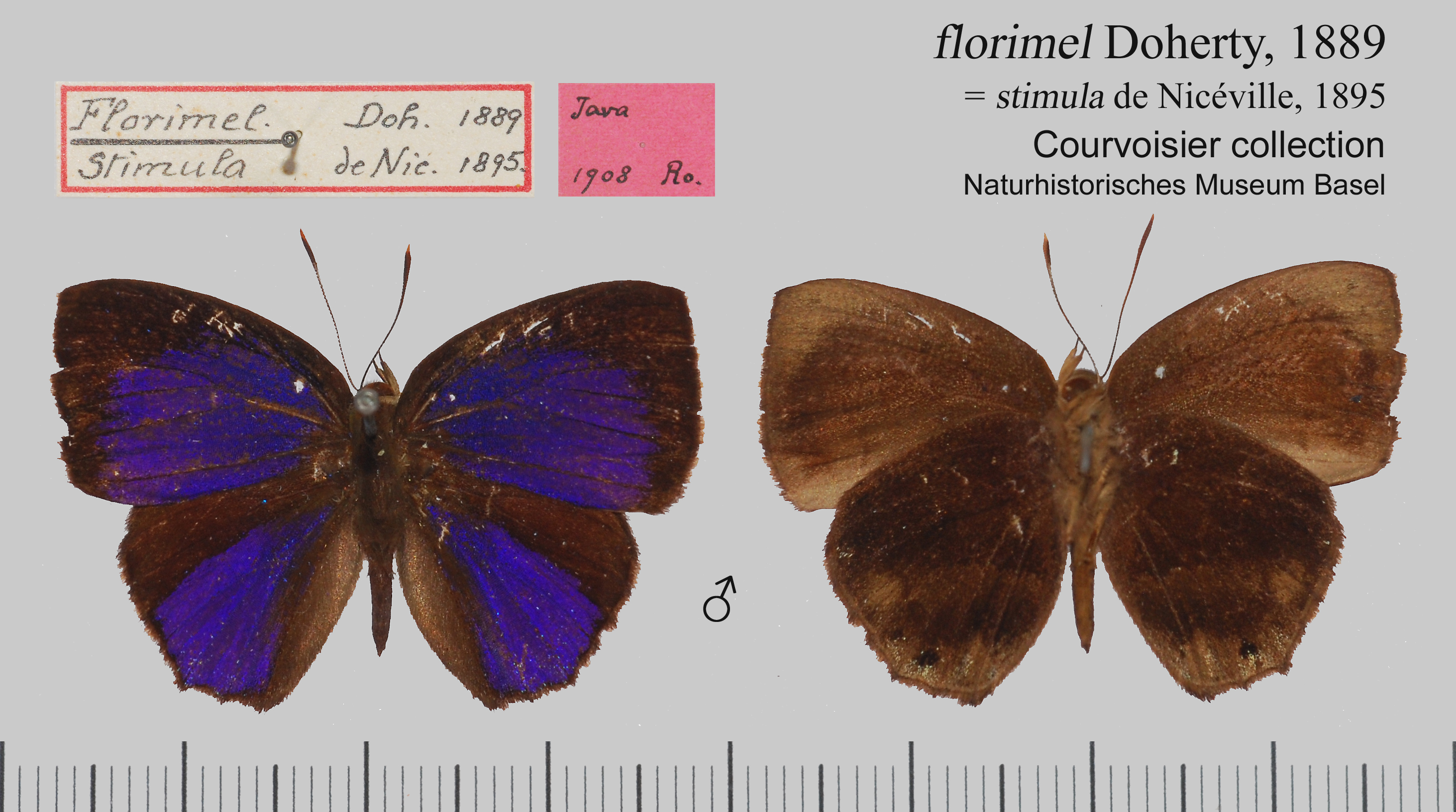
Male Courvoisier Collection, Basel
