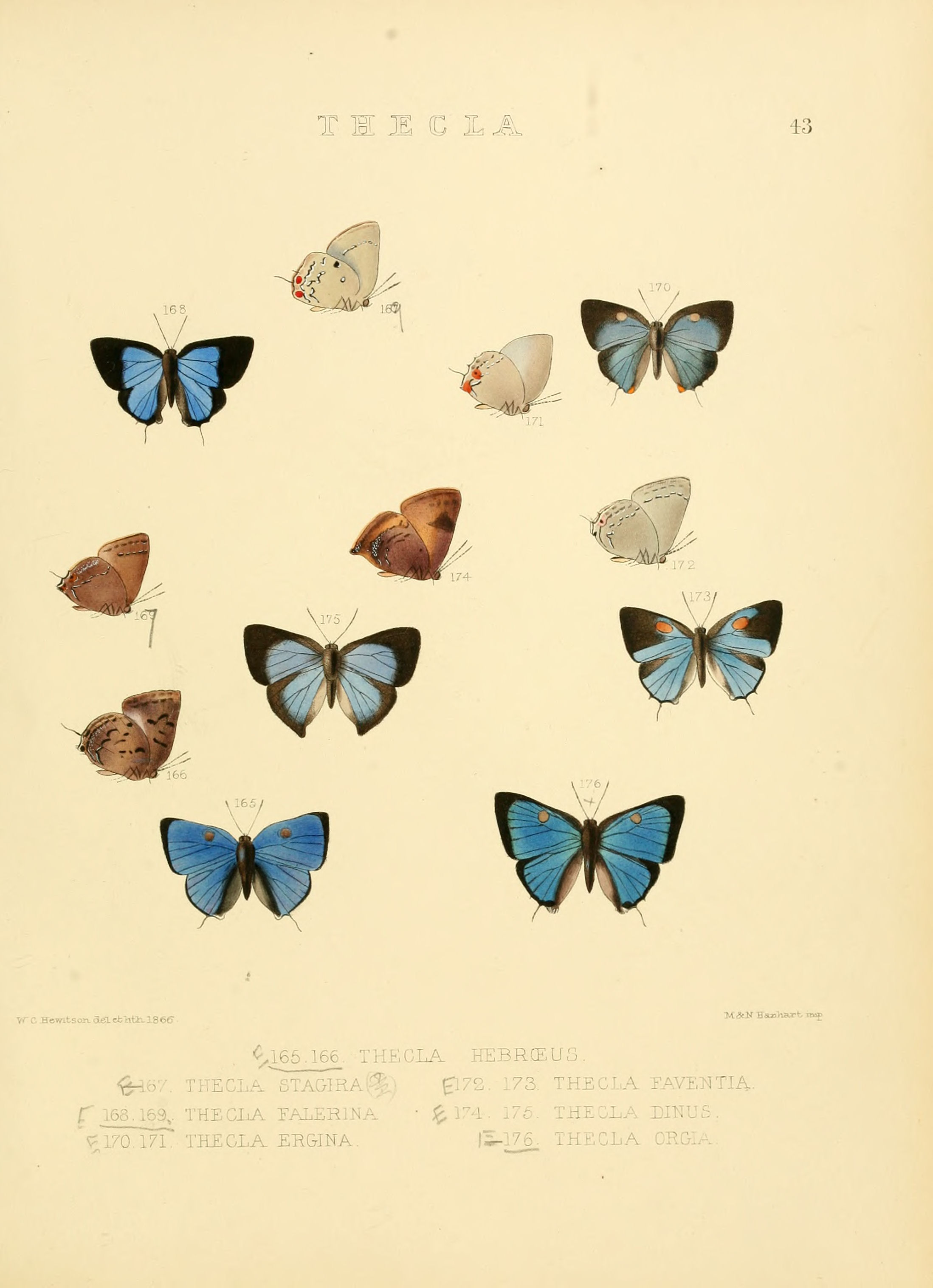
- Kolana and related genera in William Chapman Hewitson's Illustrations of Diurnal Lepidoptera

Scientific classification
- Domain: Eukaryota
- Kingdom: Animalia
- Phylum: Arthropoda
- Class: Insecta
- Order: Lepidoptera
- Family: Lycaenidae
- Tribe: Eumaeini
- Genus: Kolana; Robbins, 2004

= Kolana =

Butterfly genus in family Lycaenidae

Kolana is a genus of Neotropical butterflies in the family Lycaenidae.

== Species ==
- Kolana buccina (Druce, 1907)
- Kolana chlamys (Druce, 1907)
- Kolana ergina (Hewitson, 1867)
- Kolana ligurina (Hewitson, 1874)
- Kolana lyde (Godman & Salvin, [1887])
