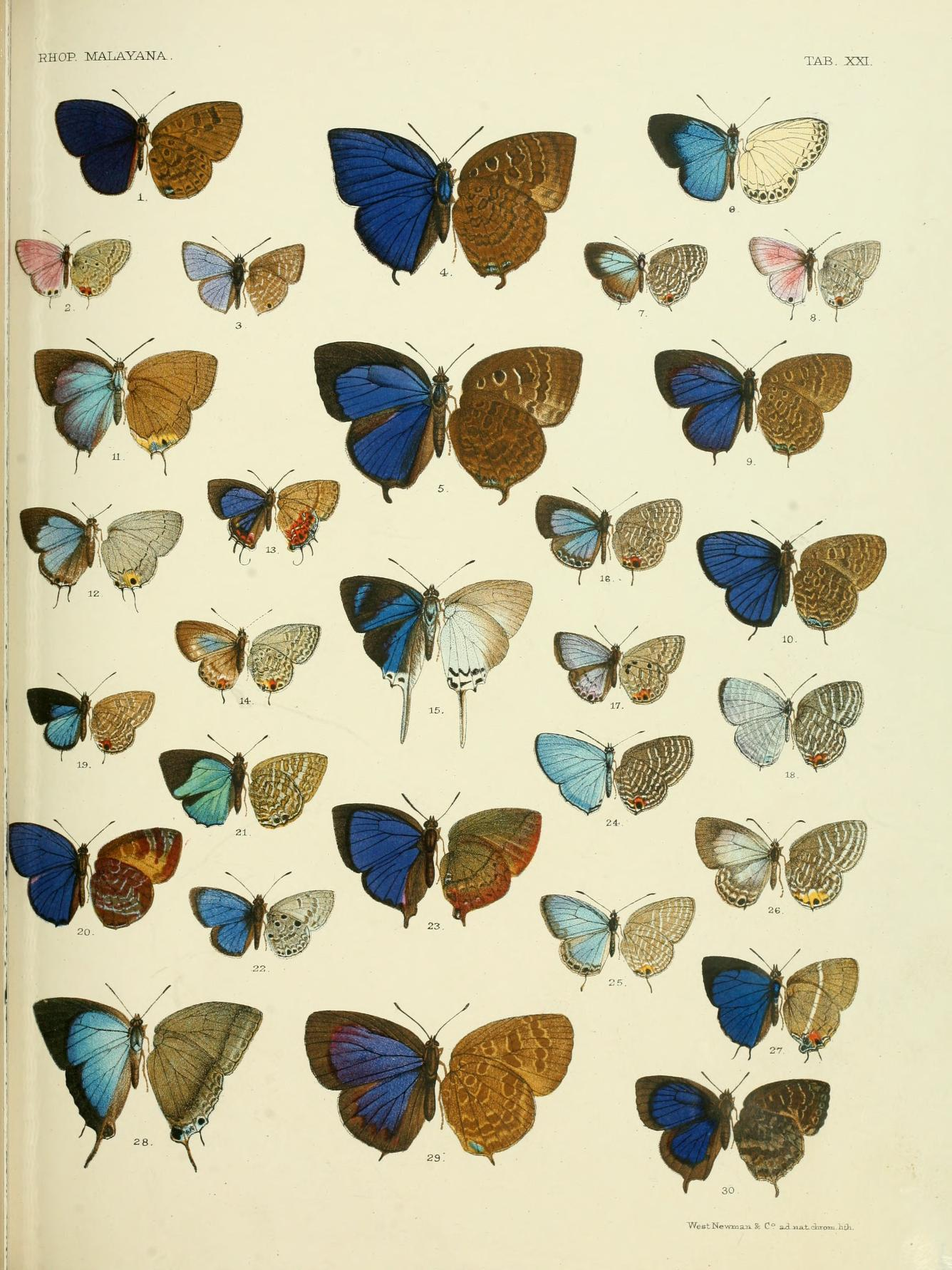
- Semanga superba in Rhopalocera Malayana figure 13

Scientific classification
- Kingdom: Animalia
- Phylum: Arthropoda
- Class: Insecta
- Order: Lepidoptera
- Family: Lycaenidae
- Subfamily: Theclinae
- Genus: Semanga; Distant, 1884

Species
- See text

Synonyms
- Keraunogramma Röber, 1887

= Semanga =

Butterfly genus in family Lycaenidae

Semanga is a genus of butterflies in the family Lycaenidae. The genus was erected by William Lucas Distant in 1884.

== Species ==
Listed alphabetically:

- Semanga helena (Röber, 1887) – Helena rededge – found in Banggai and ?Sulawesi
- Semanga superba (Druce, 1873) – found in Sumatra, Peninsular Malaya, Singapore, Langkawi, Burma, Mergui, Thailand, Pulau Tioman, Sumatra, Thailand and Vietnam
