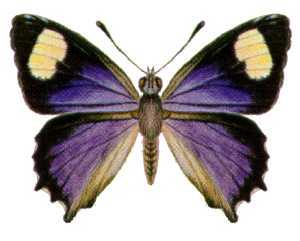
- Ogyris zosine

Scientific classification
- Kingdom: Animalia
- Phylum: Arthropoda
- Clade: Pancrustacea
- Class: Insecta
- Order: Lepidoptera
- Family: Lycaenidae
- Subfamily: Theclinae
- Tribe: Arhopalini

Genera
- Presently 11, see text

= Arhopalini =

Tribe of butterflies

The Arhopalini are a rather small tribe of butterflies in the family Lycaenidae.

== Genera ==
As not all Theclinae have been assigned to tribes, the following list of genera is preliminary:

- Apporasa
- Arhopala
- Flos
- Keraunogramma
- Mahathala
- Mota
- Ogyris
- Semanga
- Surendra
- Thaduka
- Zinaspa
